= Che Mills =

English mixed martial arts fighter (born 1982)

- Born: Ché Mills; 29 October 1982 (age 43); Gloucester, England
- Other names: Beautiful
- Nationality: English
- Height: 6 ft 1 in (1.85 m)
- Weight: 170.9 lb (77.5 kg; 12.21 st)
- Division: Middleweight; Welterweight
- Reach: 76 in (193 cm)
- Stance: Orthodox
- Fighting out of: Gloucester, England
- Team: Trojan Free Fighters
- Years active: 2003-present

Mixed martial arts record
- Total: 29
- Wins: 16
- By knockout: 9
- By submission: 4
- By decision: 3
- Losses: 10
- By knockout: 5
- By submission: 4
- By decision: 1
- No contests: 3

Other information
- Mixed martial arts record from Sherdog

Ché Mills (born 29 October 1982) is an English mixed martial artist who most recently competed in the Welterweight division of Cage Warriors. A professional competitor since 2003, he has also competed for the UFC, Cage Rage, BAMMA, and M-1 Global. He is the former Cage Rage British Welterweight Champion.

== Mixed martial arts career ==
Spent early years training with Mark Weir.

=== Early career ===
Mills made his professional MMA debut in November 2003. After going 1-2 in his first three bouts, Mills amassed an impressive undefeated streak of 8-0 (1 NC) over the next three years. He was considered a top prospect in the UK and was invited to appear on The Ultimate Fighter.

=== The Ultimate Fighter ===
Mills appeared on the first episode of The Ultimate Fighter: United States vs. United Kingdom. However, he lost an elimination match via heel hook to the subsequent winner of the competition, James Wilks, and therefore was eliminated from the show.

=== Ultimate Fighting Championship ===
Mills signed a contract with Zuffa to fight against The Ultimate Fighter 13 alumni Chris Cope at UFC 138 on 5 November 2011 in Birmingham, England. He won his debut in impressive fashion, finishing Cope by TKO just 40 seconds into the first round and was awarded Knockout of the Night honours.

Mills next faced Rory MacDonald on 21 April 2012 at UFC 145. He lost the fight via TKO in the second round.

Mills defeated Duane Ludwig on 29 September 2012 at UFC on Fuel TV 5. The bout was stopped after Ludwig was unable to continue after tearing a knee ligament while attempting to defend a takedown in the opening round.

Mills then fought Matthew Riddle on 16 February 2013 at UFC on Fuel TV: Barão vs. McDonald. Mills lost the fight via split decision and was subsequently released from the promotion.

=== Post UFC ===
After his release from UFC, Mills fought current Cage Warriors and Cage Contender welterweight champion, Cathal Pendred. The fight was changed to a non-title fight as Mills failed to make weight and was subsequently docked 25% of his fight purse. Mills lost this fight via TKO.

After a 20-month layoff, Mills returns to action in Italy, under the Venator Fighting Championship banner, in a scheduled match against Italian prospect Roberto Rigamonti. to take place on 21 May 2016 in Turin, Italy

== Championships and accomplishments ==
=== Mixed Martial Arts ===
- Cage Rage
  - Cage Rage British Welterweight Champion
- Ultimate Fighting Championship
  - Knockout of the Night (One time)
  - UFC.com Awards
    - 2011: Ranked #8 Newcomer of the Year

== Mixed martial arts record ==
Professional record breakdown
| 29 matches | 16 wins | 10 losses |
| By knockout | 9 | 5 |
| By submission | 4 | 4 |
| By decision | 3 | 1 |
| No contests | 3 | |

| Res. | Record | Opponent | Method | Event | Date | Round | Time | Location | Notes |
|---|---|---|---|---|---|---|---|---|---|
| Loss | 16–10 (3) | Lew Long | TKO (injury) | Cage Warriors 83 | 6 May 2017 | 1 | 0:18 | Newport, Wales | |
| Loss | 16–9 (3) | Matt Inman | Submission (triangle choke) | Cage Warriors: Unplugged | 12 November 2016 | 2 | 4:09 | London, England | |
| NC | 16–8 (3) | Terry Montgomery | NC (accidental illegal elbow) | Venator FC 3 | 21 May 2016 | 1 | 2:58 | Milan, Italy | Return to Welterweight. |
| Loss | 16–8 (2) | Jack Marshman | TKO (punches) | Cage Warriors 72 | 13 September 2014 | 2 | 1:32 | Newport, Wales, United Kingdom | |
| Win | 16–7 (2) | Leeroy Barnes | Submission (rear-naked choke) | Cage Warriors 68 | 3 May 2014 | 1 | 4:46 | Liverpool, England | |
| Loss | 15–7 (2) | Faycal Hucin | TKO (punches) | CWFC Fight Night 9 | 25 October 2013 | 2 | 4:23 | Amman, Jordan | Middleweight debut; Hucin missed weight (186.6 lb). |
| Loss | 15–6 (2) | Cathal Pendred | TKO (corner stoppage) | CWFC 55 | 1 June 2013 | 3 | 1:47 | Dublin, Ireland | Non-title bout; Mills missed weight (170.7 lb). |
| NC | 15–5 (2) | Matthew Riddle | NC (overturned) | UFC on Fuel TV: Barão vs. McDonald | 16 February 2013 | 3 | 5:00 | London, England | Originally a split decision loss; overturned after Riddle tested positive for marijuana. |
| Win | 15–5 (1) | Duane Ludwig | TKO (knee injury) | UFC on Fuel TV: Struve vs. Miocic | 29 September 2012 | 1 | 2:28 | Nottingham, England | |
| Loss | 14–5 (1) | Rory MacDonald | TKO (punches) | UFC 145 | 21 April 2012 | 2 | 2:20 | Atlanta, Georgia, United States | |
| Win | 14–4 (1) | Chris Cope | TKO (knees and punches) | UFC 138 | 5 November 2011 | 1 | 0:40 | Birmingham, England, United Kingdom | Knockout of the Night. |
| Win | 13–4 (1) | Marcio Cesar | KO (punches) | BAMMA 6: Watson vs. Rua | 10 May 2011 | 1 | 4:05 | London, England, United Kingdom | |
| Win | 12–4 (1) | Magomed Shikhshabekov | Decision (unanimous) | M-1 Challenge 21: Guram vs. Garner | 28 October 2010 | 4 | 5:00 | St. Petersburg, Leningrad Oblast, Russia | |
| Win | 11–4 (1) | Jake Hecht | Decision (unanimous) | Cage Warriors 38: Young Guns | 1 October 2010 | 3 | 5:00 | North London, England, United Kingdom | |
| Win | 10–4 (1) | Manuel Garcia | KO (knee) | Cagemania: Carnage on the Costa | 29 May 2010 | 1 | 0:09 | Benalmádena, Spain | |
| Loss | 9–4 (1) | Yuya Shirai | Submission (armbar) | Astra: Yoshida's Farewell | 25 April 2010 | 1 | 3:59 | Tokyo, Japan | |
| Loss | 9–3 (1) | Jim Wallhead | Decision (unanimous) | KUMMA 3: Mills vs. Wallhead | 1 November 2009 | 3 | 5:00 | Newport, Wales, United Kingdom | |
| Win | 9–2 (1) | Edgelson Lua | Decision (unanimous) | BAMMA 1 | 27 June 2009 | 3 | 5:00 | London, England, United Kingdom | |
| Win | 8–2 (1) | Aidan Marron | TKO (submission to punches) | KUMMA 1: Mills vs. Marron | 29 May 2009 | 1 | N/A | Wells, Somerset, England, United Kingdom | |
| Win | 7–2 (1) | Marius Žaromskis | TKO (doctor stoppage) | Cage Rage 26 | 10 May 2008 | 1 | 5:00 | London, United Kingdom | Won the Cage Rage British Welterweight Championship. |
| Win | 6–2 (1) | Ross Mason | Submission (rear-naked choke) | Cage Rage 23 | 22 September 2007 | 1 | 2:07 | London, England, United Kingdom | |
| Win | 5–2 (1) | Afnan Saeed | TKO (punches) | Cage Rage Contenders 5 | 16 June 2007 | 1 | 1:22 | East London, United Kingdom | |
| Win | 4–2 (1) | Oriol Gaset | Submission (rear-naked choke) | CFS: D-Day | 12 May 2007 | 1 | 1:22 | England, United Kingdom | |
| NC | 3–2 (1) | Paul Taylor | NC (overturned) | Cage Rage Contenders 3 | 12 November 2006 | 1 | 2:37 | London, England, United Kingdom | Spectator with air horn distracted fighters, allowing Mills submission victory. Result was later overturned. |
| Win | 3–2 | Marius Žaromskis | KO (knee) | Cage Rage Contenders 2 | 20 August 2006 | 1 | 4:49 | Streatham, South London, United Kingdom | |
| Win | 2–2 | Ross Mason | TKO (punches) | AM 9: Southern Agrrression 4 | 2 July 2006 | 1 | 0:23 | Weston-super-Mare, England, United Kingdom | |
| Loss | 1–2 | Pedro Bessa | Submission (americana) | AM 5: Southern Agrrression 2 | 4 December 2005 | 1 | N/A | Weston-super-Mare, England, United Kingdom | |
| Win | 1–1 | Chris Taylor | Submission (guillotine choke) | UK: Storm | 18 June 2005 | 1 | 0:23 | Birmingham, England, United Kingdom | |
| Loss | 0–1 | Matt Thorpe | Submission (armbar) | XFC 2: The Perfect Storm | 9 November 2003 | 1 | 0:42 | Cornwall, England, United Kingdom | |
