= Dave Legeno =

British mixed martial arts fighter (1963–2014)

- Born: David Steven Murray; 12 October 1963; Marylebone, London, England
- Died: 6 July 2014 (aged 50); Death Valley, California, U.S.
- Occupations: Actor, mixed martial artist
- Years active: 1994–2014
- Spouse: Angel Legeno (m. 1984; div. 2007)
- Children: 1

Dave Legeno (12 October 1963 – 6 July 2014) was a British actor, mixed martial artist, and professional wrestler.

== Early life ==
Legeno was born David Steven Murray in Marylebone, London, England.

== Career ==
Legeno's first major film role was in Guy Ritchie's Snatch. He had roles in Batman Begins, Elizabeth: The Golden Age, Centurion, and Last Knights. Legeno played the werewolf Fenrir Greyback in Harry Potter and the Half-Blood Prince, Harry Potter and the Deathly Hallows – Part 1, and Part 2.

Legeno also featured in the music video for the single Stomp by British pop group Steps.

Legeno voiced and motion-captured for the video game The Getaway: Black Monday as a protagonist, Eddie O'Connor. He was trained in various combat styles, including boxing, wrestling, judo, Brazilian jiu-jitsu, and Muay Thai.

He also was a professional wrestler as Lone Wolf for the British Wrestling Federation from 1991 to 1992.

== Death ==
Legeno's body was found by a pair of hikers on 6 July 2014 in Death Valley, California, United States. Due to the remoteness of the area, a helicopter was called in to retrieve his remains. Legeno died of heat-related health problems and may have been dead for three to four days before his body was discovered. No foul play was suspected.

A memorial evening took place in London on 12 October 2014, which would have been Legeno's 51st birthday. It was held at Camden Underworld, the venue where Legeno had held his album launch in 2004. The memorial was attended by fellow cast members of Harry Potter and Snatch, as well as by friends from the mixed martial arts community and music industry. Actors Tom Felton and Nick Moran and Cage Rage founder, Dave O'Donnell, spoke about Legeno, and his favourite songs were performed live.

The film Last Knights was dedicated to him.

== Filmography ==
Year	Title	Role	Notes
1994–2003	The Bill	Biker / Pete Wilson / Man at Boxing Match	3 episodes
2000	Snatch	John	
2000	Hope and Glory	Royston Warrior	1 episode
2003	Ed Stone Is Dead	Muscle Guy	Episode: "Hi Honey, I'm Dead"
2004	The Getaway: Black Monday	Eddie O'Connor	Video game
2004–2005	EastEnders	Tudor	2 episodes
2005	Batman Begins	League of Shadows Warrior #4	
2005	The Last Detective	Justin	Episode: "Three Steps to Hendon"
2006	The Dealer	Bolt	
2006	Rollin' with the Nines	Carl	
2006	Stormbreaker	Bear	
2007	Outlaw	Ian Furlong	
2007	Roman's Empire	Gangster	1 episode
2007	Rise of the Footsoldier	Big John	
2007	Elizabeth: The Golden Age	Executioner	
2007	Emmerdale	Seamus Flint	1 episode
2008	The Cottage	The Farmer	
2009	Harry Potter and the Half-Blood Prince	Fenrir Greyback	
2009	Command Performance	Oleg Kazov	
2009	The Fixer	Marty	1 episode
2009	44 Inch Chest	Brighton Billy	Uncredited
2010	Centurion	Vortix	
2010	Lennon Naked	Les	TV movie
2010	Dead Cert	Yuvesky	
2010	Bonded by Blood	Jack Whomes	
2010	Spooks	Gilles Rigaut	1 episode
2010	Harry Potter and the Deathly Hallows – Part 1	Fenrir Greyback	
2011	Harry Potter and the Deathly Hallows – Part 2	Fenrir Greyback	
2011	The Incident	J.B.	
2011	Big Fat Gypsy Gangster	Gypsy Dave	
2011	Great Expectations	Borrit	1 episode
2011–2014	Borgia	Guidebaldo de Montefeltro	4 episodes
2012	The Raven	Percy	
2012	Titanic	Seaman Davis	1 episode
2012	Snow White and the Huntsman	Broch	
2013	Ripper Street	George	Episode "The King Came Calling"
2015	Sword of Vengeance	Osgar	Posthumous release
2015	Last Knights	Olaf	Posthumous release, final acting role

== Mixed martial arts record ==
Professional record breakdown
7 matches	4 wins	3 losses
By knockout	1	1
By submission	2	2
By decision	1	0

Res.	Record	Opponent	Method	Event	Date	Round	Time	Location	Notes
Win	4–3	Herb Dean	TKO (eye injury)	Cage Rage 22	14 July 2007	1	5:00	London, England	
Win	3–3	Dan Severn	Decision (unanimous)	Cage Rage 20	10 February 2007	3	5:00	London, England	
Win	2–3	Alan Murdock	Submission (rear-naked choke)	Cage Rage 19	9 December 2006	1	4:10	London, England	
Win	1–3	Kimo Leopoldo	Submission (guillotine choke)	Cage Rage 18	30 September 2006	1	3:21	London, England	
Loss	0–3	Mark Epstein	KO (punches)	Cage Rage 17	1 July 2006	1	0:45	London, England	
Loss	0–2	Ikuhisa Minowa	Submission (achilles lock)	Cage Rage 15	4 February 2006	1	2:21	London, England	
Loss	0–1	Alan Murdock	Submission (armbar)	Cage Rage 14	3 December 2005	1	4:07	London, England	
