= 2008 in Cage Rage Championships =

Information
- First date: February 2, 2008
- Last date: November 1, 2008

Events
- Total events: 9

Fights
- Total fights: 106
- Title fights: 5

Chronology
2007 in Cage Rage	2008 in Cage Rage Championships

The year 2008 was the 7th year in the history of the Cage Rage Championships, a mixed martial arts promotion based in the United Kingdom. In 2008 Cage Rage Championships held 9 events, Cage Rage Contenders 8.

== Title fights ==
Title fights in 2008
Weight class				Method	Round	Time	Event	Notes
Featherweight	Masakazu Imanari (c)	def.	Jean Silva	Submission (Heel Hook)	1	2:30	Cage Rage 25	(Note: For the World Featherweight Championship.)
Light Heavyweight	Ian Freeman	def.	Paul Cahoon	Decision (Unanimous)	3	5:00	Cage Rage 26	(Note: For the British Light Heavyweight Championship.)
Welterweight	Che Mills	def.	Marius Zaromskis	TKO (Doctor Stoppage)	1	5:00	Cage Rage 26	(Note: For the British Welterweight Championship.)
Middleweight	Matt Ewin (c)	def.	Mark Epstein	Decision (Unanimous)	3	5:00	Cage Rage 26	(Note: For the British Middleweight Championship.)
Heavyweight	Mostapha al-Turk	def.	James McSweeney	TKO (Punches)	1	2:06	Cage Rage 27	(Note: For the British Heavyweight Championship.)

== Events list ==
#	Event title	Date	Arena	Location
43	Cage Rage UK - Fighting Hurts Final	November 1, 2008	The Troxy	London, United Kingdom
42	Cage Rage 28	September 20, 2008	The Troxy	London, United Kingdom
41	Cage Rage 27	July 12, 2008	Wembley Arena	London, United Kingdom
40	Cage Rage Contenders 10	June 14, 2008	The Troxy	London, United Kingdom
39	Cage Rage 26	May 10, 2008	NEC Arena	Birmingham, United Kingdom
38	Cage Rage Contenders - Ireland vs. Belgium	May 3, 2008	National Stadium	Dublin, Ireland
37	Cage Rage Contenders 9	April 12, 2008	The Troxy	London, United Kingdom
36	Cage Rage 25	March 8, 2008	Wembley Arena	London, United Kingdom
35	Cage Rage Contenders 8	February 2, 2008	The Troxy	London, United Kingdom

== Cage Rage Contenders 8 ==
Cage Rage Contenders 8 was an event held on February 2, 2008 at The Troxy in London, United Kingdom.

=== Results ===
Main Card
Weight class				Method	Round	Time	Notes
	Francis Heagney	def.	Francesco Ligato	Submission (Guillotine Choke)	1	1:07
	Popek Rak	def.	Glen Reid	TKO (Corner Stoppage)	2	1:56
	Scott Jansen	def.	Jason Barrett	TKO (Corner Stoppage)	1	5:00
	Dean Bray	def.	Mark Tucker	TKO	2	4:12
	Marius Buzinskas	def.	Danny Fletcher	Submission (Guillotine Choke)	1	2:17
	Sami Berik	def.	Mark Smith	KO	1	0:09
	Edgelson Lua	def.	Matt Lane	TKO	1	2:12
	Chris Greig	def.	Kev Sims	Submission (Choke)	1	2:08
	Jack Mason	def.	Kym Farid	Submission (Guillotine Choke)	1	4:03
	Tony Machado	def.	Mamarizaev Jahongir	Submission (Rear Naked Choke)	1	1:24
	Steve Dossett	def.	Robert Powell	Submission (Guillotine Choke)	1	3:39
	Azran Quasid	def.	Rick Andrews	KO	1	3:00
	Richard Griffin	def.	Paddy Moore	Submission (Guillotine Choke)	1	1:44
	Uvais Namiev	def.	Jody Cottham	TKO	1	1:27

== Cage Rage 25 ==
Cage Rage 25 was an event held on March 8, 2008 at Wembley Arena in London, United Kingdom.

=== Results ===
Main Card
Weight class				Method	Round	Time	Notes
	Robert Berry	def.	Ken Shamrock	KO (Punches)	1	3:26
Featherweight	Masakazu Imanari (c)	def.	Jean Silva	Submission (Heel Hook)	1	2:30	(Note: For the World Featherweight Championship.)
	Rob Broughton	def.	Neil Grove	Decision (Majority)	3	5:00
	Tom Watson	def.	Pierre Guillet	KO (Upkick)	1	2:05
	Mostapha al-Turk	def.	Gary Turner	TKO (Submission to punches)	1	3:19
	Ivan Serati	def.	Roman Webber	TKO (Punches)	1	0:48
	Henrique Santana	def.	Michael Johnson	Decision (Unanimous)	3	5:00
	Aisling Daly	def.	Aysen Berik	TKO (Corner Stoppage)	1	1:49
	Giorgio Andrews	def.	Ryan Shamrock	TKO (Doctor Stoppage)	1	5:00
	John Hathaway	def.	Marvin Arnold Bleau	TKO (Punches)	1	1:32
	John Phillips	vs.	Jake Bostwick	No Contest	1	4:10

== Cage Rage Contenders 9 ==
Cage Rage Contenders 9 was an event held on April 12, 2008 at The Troxy in London, United Kingdom.

=== Results ===
Main Card
Weight class				Method	Round	Time	Notes
	Joe Mac	def.	Jason Barrett	TKO (Punches)	1	3:38
	Suley Mahmoud	def.	Jordan James	Decision (Unanimous)	3	5:00
	Jack Mason	def.	Jake Bostwick	Submission (Heel Hook)	1	2:27
	Ashleigh Grimshaw	def.	Cristian Binda	TKO (Punches)	1	4:25
	Marvin Arnold Bleau	def.	Kes Kpokogri	Submission (Verbal)	3	1:10
	Mamarizaev Jahongir	vs.	Kym Farid	No Contest	1	0:38
	Denniston Sutherland	def.	Ryan White	Submission (Rear-Naked Choke)	2	3:11
	Jason Young	def.	Jody Cottham	TKO (Punches)	1	3:02
	Marius Buzinskas	def.	Richard Griffin	KO (Punch)	1	1:44
	James Elson	def.	Daniel Cubitt	Submission (Rear-Naked Choke)	1	4:40
	Lee Wieczorek	def.	Steven Elliott	Decision (Unanimous)	3	5:00
	Umidjon Mavlyanov	def.	Azran Quasid	TKO (Punches)	1	0:47
	Edgelson Lua	def.	Dan Movahedi	KO (Punch)	1	0:30
	Chris Gregg	def.	Kieran Hanbly	Submission (Guillotine Choke)	2	4:05

== Cage Rage Contenders - Ireland vs. Belgium ==
Cage Rage Contenders - Ireland vs. Belgium was an event held on May 3, 2008 at National Stadium in Dublin, Ireland.

=== Results ===
Main Card
Weight class				Method	Round	Time	Notes
	Owen Roddy	def.	Amin El Allali	Submission (Armbar)	1	N/A
	Wim Deputter	def.	Tom Maguire	Decision (Unanimous)	3	5:00
	Bastien Huveneers	def.	Dave Kelly	Submission (Kimura)	1	N/A
	Emmet McNally	def.	Ludovic Boulvin	KO (Punches)	1	N/A
	Aisling Daly	def.	Myriem el Banouti	TKO (Punches)	1	1:38
	Sergei Maslobojev	def.	Colin Laird	TKO (Punches)	1	N/A
	Steve McCombe	def.	Paul Cowzer	Submission (Rear-Naked Choke)	1	N/A
	Conor McGregor	def.	Mo Taylor	TKO (Punches)	1	1:06
	Peter Wilson	def.	Gary Morris	TKO (Punches)	3	N/A

== Cage Rage 26 ==
Cage Rage 26 was an event held on May 10, 2008 at NEC Arena in Birmingham, United Kingdom.

=== Results ===
Main Card
Weight class				Method	Round	Time	Notes
Light Heavyweight	Ian Freeman	def.	Paul Cahoon	Decision (Unanimous)	3	5:00	(Note: For the British Light Heavyweight Championship.)
Welterweight	Che Mills	def.	Marius Zaromskis	TKO (Doctor Stoppage)	1	5:00	(Note: For the British Welterweight Championship.)
	James Zikic	def.	Rodney Glunder	Submission (Armbar)	3	0:25
	Ross Pointon	def.	Ross Mason	Submission (Heel Hook)	1	1:36
Middleweight	Matt Ewin (c)	def.	Mark Epstein	Decision (Unanimous)	3	5:00	(Note: For the British Middleweight Championship.)
	Henrique Cesar Nogueira	vs.	Marc Goddard	Draw	3	5:00
	Brad Pickett	def.	Paul Reed	Decision (Majority)	3	5:00
	Popek Rak	def.	Kev Sims	KO (Punches)	1	1:12
	Chris Rice	def.	Edgelson Lua	KO (Punches)	3	1:35
	Harvey Harra	def.	Gary Kelly	Submission (Triangle Choke)	1	3:46

== Cage Rage Contenders 10 ==
Cage Rage Contenders 10 was an event held on June 14, 2008 at The Troxy in London, United Kingdom.

=== Results ===
Main Card
Weight class				Method	Round	Time	Notes
	Denniston Sutherland	def.	Mark Buchanan	TKO (Punches)	2	4:48
	Jack Mason	def.	Mamarizaev Jahongir	DQ (Illegal Elbows)	1	4:17
	Steve O'Rourke	def.	Nigel Whitear	KO (Punches)	1	0:40
	Steve Dossett	def.	Jake Bostwick	TKO (Hand Injury)	1	1:04
	Brett Bassett	def.	Jamaine Facey	KO	1	0:25
	Kym Farid	def.	Daniel Cubitt	TKO (Punches)	2	0:47
	Mark Smith	def.	Jay Gilbey	Submission (Guillotine Choke)	1	0:50
	Richard Griffin	def.	Deano Durant	Submission (Rear Naked Choke)	1	1:23
	Marcin Bartkiewicz	def.	Anton Schutte	TKO	1	1:25
	Billy Mahoney	def.	Rob Johnson	Submission (Rear Naked Choke)	1	0:57
	Irving Daniels	def.	Pacer Allen	TKO (Knee Injury)	1	0:23
	Chris Greig	def.	Svajunas Siacuila	TKO (Punches)	1	1:41
	Alex Harvey	def.	Jody Cottham	Submission (Rear Naked Choke)	1	1:48

== Cage Rage 27 ==
Cage Rage 27 was an event held on July 12, 2008 at Wembley Arena in London, United Kingdom.

=== Results ===
Main Card
Weight class				Method	Round	Time	Notes
	Phil Baroni	def.	Scott Jansen	KO (Punch)	1	3:18
	Neil Grove	def.	Robert Berry	TKO (Punches)	2	1:29
Heavyweight	Mostapha al-Turk	def.	James McSweeney	TKO (Punches)	1	2:06	(Note: For the British Heavyweight Championship.)
	Tom Watson	def.	John Phillips	Decision (Unanimous)	3	5:00
	Stav Economou	def.	Marcin Bartkiewicz	Decision (Unanimous)	3	5:00
	Robbie Olivier	def.	Ashleigh Grimshaw	Submission (Rear-Naked Choke)	2	4:01
	Brad Pickett	def.	Cristian Binda	Submission (Guillotine Choke)	2	2:52
	Aisling Daly	def.	Eva Liskova	Submission (Rear-Naked Choke)	1	1:18
	Jason Young	def.	Francis Heagney	Decision (Unanimous)	3	5:00
	Wesley Johnson	def.	Mark Brown	TKO (Punches)	1	0:31
	Jody Cottham	def.	Umidjon Mavlyanov	Submission (Guillotine Choke)	2	3:16
	Dave Van Gasse	def.	James Elson	Submission (Rear-Naked Choke)	3	3:43

== Cage Rage 28 ==
Cage Rage 28 was an event held on September 20, 2008 at The Troxy in London, United Kingdom.

=== Results ===
Main Card
Weight class				Method	Round	Time	Notes
	James Mcsweeney	def.	Roman Webber	KO (Knee)	1	0:10
	Robbie Olivier	def.	Leigh Remedios	Decision (Unanimous)	3	5:00
	Brad Pickett	def.	Antanas Jazbutis	KO (Punch to the Body)	3	2:10
	John Phillips	def.	Jake Bostwick	TKO (Submission to punches)	2	2:47
	Ross Mason	def.	Scott Jansen	Decision (Unanimous)	3	5:00
	John Hathaway	def.	Jack Mason	TKO (Submission to punches)	1	2:41
	Alberto Mina	def.	Steven Elliott	Submission (Rear-Naked Choke)	1	2:55
	Michael Pastou	def.	Nigel Whitear	Disqualification	1	1:18
	Steven Hopwood	def.	Neil Turner	Submission (Rear-Naked Choke)	2	1:45
	Jamaine Facey	def.	Scott Rogan	Submission (Armbar)	1	4:54
	Wesley Johnson	def.	Matt Smith	Submission (Triangle Choke)	1	0:44
	Ashley Pollard	def.	Ben Smith	Submission (Kimura)	1	4:34

== Cage Rage UK - Fighting Hurts Final ==
Cage Rage UK - Fighting Hurts Final was an event held on November 1, 2008 at The Troxy in London, United Kingdom.

=== Results ===
Main Card
Weight class				Method	Round	Time	Notes
	Leigh Alliss	def.	Dyson Roberts	Submission (Rear-Naked Choke)	3	0:47
	Sami Berik	def.	Afnan Saeed	KO (Punch)	1	1:44
	Steven Elliott	def.	Richard Griffin	Submission (Kimura)	2	3:57
	Giorgio Andrews	def.	Davin Byfield	Submission (Rear-Naked Choke)	1	4:47
	Brett Bassett	def.	Steve Dossett	Submission (Triangle Choke)	1	1:05
	Peter Bowen	def.	Karl Lawrence	TKO (Punches)	2	4:05
	Jamaine Facey	def.	Joe Holder	Submission (Rear-Naked Choke)	1	2:02
	Chris Greig	def.	Kevin Ludick	Submission (Keylock)	2	2:29
	Anthony Leslie	def.	Darren Walsh	TKO (Nose Injury)	1	0:45
	Tony Carney	def.	Ben Smith	TKO (Punches)	2	1:02
	Jon Tomkinson	def.	Roy Allison Jr.	TKO (Punches)	1	1:45

== See also ==
- Cage Rage Championships
- List of Cage Rage champions
- List of Cage Rage events
