= 2007 in Cage Rage Championships =

Information
- First date: February 10, 2007
- Last date: December 1, 2007

Events
- Total events: 12

Fights
- Total fights: 140
- Title fights: 12

Chronology
2006 in Cage Rage	2007 in Cage Rage Championships	2008 in Cage Rage

The year 2007 was the 6th year in the history of the Cage Rage Championships, a mixed martial arts promotion based in the United Kingdom. In 2007 Cage Rage Championships held 12 events, Cage Rage 15.

== Title fights ==
Title fights in 2007
Weight class				Method	Round	Time	Event	Notes
Heavyweight	Tengiz Tedoradze	def.	Rob Broughton (c)	TKO (Doctor Stoppage)	2	0:58	Cage Rage 20	(Note: For the British Heavyweight Championship.)
Featherweight	Masakazu Imanari (c)	def.	Robbie Olivier	Submission (Armbar)	1	0:27	Cage Rage 20	(Note: For the World Featherweight Championship.)
Heavyweight	James Zikic	def.	Evangelista Santos	Decision (Unanimous)	3	5:00	Cage Rage 21	(Note: For the World Light Heavyweight Championship.)
Welterweight	Paul Daley (c)	def.	Paul Jenkins	Submission (Punch to the Body)	2	0:41	Cage Rage 21	(Note: For the British Welterweight Championship and the World Welterweight Championship)
Lightweight	Abdul Mohamed (c)	def.	Ross Pointon	KO (Spinning Back Fist)	1	3:20	Cage Rage 21	(Note: For the British Lightweight Championship.)
Light Heavyweight	Paul Cahoon	def.	Mark Epstein	Decision (Unanimous)	3	5:00	Cage Rage 22	(Note: For the British Light Heavyweight Championship.)
Featherweight	Robbie Olivier (c)	def.	Ronnie Mann	Decision (Unanimous)	3	5:00	Cage Rage 22	(Note: For the British Featherweight Championship.)
Heavyweight	Vitor Belfort	def.	James Zikic (c)	Decision (Unanimous)	3	5:00	Cage Rage 23	(Note: For the World Light Heavyweight Championship.)
Welterweight	Paul Daley	def.	Mark Weir	TKO (Punches)	2	2:14	Cage Rage 23	(Note: For the World Welterweight Championship.)
Heavyweight	Tengiz Tedoradze (c)	def.	Mostapha Al-Turk	Decision (Unanimous)	3	5:00	Cage Rage 23	(Note: For the British Heavyweight Championship.)
Middleweight	Matt Ewin	def.	Alex Reid	Decision (Unanimous)	3	5:00	Cage Rage 23	(Note: For the British Middleweight Championship.)
Lightweight	Abdul Mohamed (c)	def.	Robbie Olivier	Decision (Majority)	3	5:00	Cage Rage 24	(Note: For the British Lightweight Championship.)

== Events list ==
#	Event Title	Date	Arena	Location
34	Cage Rage 24	December 1, 2007	Wembley Arena	London, United Kingdom
33	Cage Rage Contenders: Wales	November 18, 2007	Brangwyn Hall	Swansea, United Kingdom
32	Cage Rage Contenders 7	November 10, 2007	The Troxy	London, United Kingdom
31	Cage Rage Contenders: Dynamite	September 29, 2007	National Stadium	Dublin, Ireland
30	Cage Rage 23	September 22, 2007	Wembley Arena	London, United Kingdom
29	Cage Rage Contenders 6	August 18, 2007		London, United Kingdom
28	Cage Rage 22	July 14, 2007	Wembley Arena	London, United Kingdom
27	Cage Rage Contenders 5	June 16, 2007	Wembley Arena	London, United Kingdom
26	Cage Rage Contenders: The Real Deal	May 26, 2007	The Point	Dublin, Ireland
25	Cage Rage 21	April 21, 2007	Wembley Arena	London, United Kingdom
24	Cage Rage Contenders 4	March 4, 2007	Hammersmith Palais	London, United Kingdom
23	Cage Rage 20	February 10, 2007	Wembley Arena	London, United Kingdom

== Cage Rage 20 ==
Cage Rage 20 was an event held on February 10, 2007, at Wembley Arena in London, United Kingdom.

=== Results ===
Main Card
Weight class				Method	Round	Time	Notes
	Eric Esch	def.	James Thompson	KO (Punches)	1	0:43
	Mostapha Al-Turk	def.	Mark Kerr	TKO (Submission to punches)	1	2:29
Heavyweight	Tengiz Tedoradze	def.	Rob Broughton (c)	TKO (Doctor Stoppage)	2	0:58	(Note: For the British Heavyweight Championship.)
	Dave Legeno	def.	Dan Severn	Decision (Unanimous)	3	5:00
	Daijiro Matsui	def.	Tom Watson	Submission (Armbar)	1	0:59
	Robert Berry	def.	Mark Buchanan	TKO (Submission to punches)	1	2:18
	Tom Blackledge	def.	Tom Howard	KO (Head Kick)	1	0:40
Featherweight	Masakazu Imanari (c)	def.	Robbie Olivier	Submission (Armbar)	1	0:27	(Note: For the World Featherweight Championship.)
	Marius Zaromskis	def.	Damien Riccio	TKO (Cut)	3	4:30
	Ronnie Mann	def.	Ashleigh Grimshaw	Decision (Unanimous)	3	5:00
	Jacek Toczydlowski	def.	Jason Barrett	TKO (Doctor Stoppage)	1	4:04
	Francis Heagney	def.	Lee Doski	Submission (Kimura)	2	2:50

== Cage Rage Contenders 4 ==
Cage Rage Contenders 4 was an event held on March 4, 2007, at Hammersmith Palais in London, United Kingdom.

=== Results ===
Main Card
Weight class				Method	Round	Time	Notes
	Sol Gilbert	def.	Darren Guisha	TKO (Punches)	3	2:24
	Tom Watson	def.	Dorlan O'Malley	TKO (Punches)	1	2:51
	Michael Pastou	def.	Jake Bostwick	TKO (Punches)	1	4:48
	Alex Paulskorsaks	def.	Afnan Saeed	Submission (Ankle Lock)	1	2:18
	Steven Elliott	def.	Deano Durant	TKO (Submission to punches)	1	1:55
	Joe Mac	def.	Marvin Arnold Bleau	TKO (Punches)	1	4:08
	Jeff Lawson	def.	Mark Dayrell	Submission (Armbar)	1	1:23
	Lloyd Clarkson	def.	Dan Movahedi	KO (Punch)	1	3:15
	Sunnat Ilyasov	def.	Mindaugas Mockevicius	Submission (Guillotine Choke)	1	0:31
	John Hathaway	def.	Sergei Ussanov	Submission (Rear-Naked Choke)	1	2:08
	Jeff Hayes	def.	Jamie Spooner	TKO (Punches)	2	1:33
	Luke Smith	def.	Jack Miles	KO (Punch)	1	0:40

== Cage Rage 21 ==
Cage Rage 21 was an event held on April 21, 2007, at Wembley Arena in London, United Kingdom.

=== Results ===
Main Card
Weight class				Method	Round	Time	Notes
	Gary Turner	def.	David Abbott	TKO (Punches)	1	2:31
	Vitor Belfort	def.	Ivan Serati	TKO (Punches)	1	3:47
Heavyweight	James Zikic	def.	Evangelista Santos	Decision (Unanimous)	3	5:00	(Note: For the World Light Heavyweight Championship.)
	Murilo Rua	def.	Alex Reid	TKO (Cut on the Shin)	1	0:28
	Mark Weir	def.	Daijiro Matsui	Decision (Unanimous)	3	5:00
	Mark Epstein	def.	Roman Webber	KO (Punch)	1	0:00
Welterweight	Paul Daley (c)	def.	Paul Jenkins	TKO (Submission to punch to the Body)	2	0:41	(Note: For the British Welterweight Championship and the World Welterweight Championship)
Lightweight	Abdul Mohamed (c)	def.	Ross Pointon	KO (Spinning Back Fist)	1	3:20	(Note: For the British Lightweight Championship.)
	Cyrille Diabate	def.	Ryan Robinson	Submission (Armbar)	1	1:15
	Alex Owen	def.	Brad Pickett	Decision (Majority)	3	5:00
	Xavier Foupa-Pokam	def.	Tom Watson	Submission (Triangle Kimura)	2	2:27
	James Evans-Nicolle	def.	Sunnat Ilyasov	Decision (Majority)	3	5:00

== Cage Rage Contenders: The Real Deal ==
Cage Rage Contenders: The Real Deal was an event held on May 26, 2007, at The Point in Dublin, Ireland.

=== Results ===
Main Card
Weight class				Method	Round	Time	Notes
	Henrique Santana	def.	Paul Jenkins	TKO (Punches)	2	3:50
	Adrian Degorski	def.	Phillip Schade	Submission (Triangle Choke)	2	2:02
	Samy Schiavo	def.	Mark Dayrell	TKO (Punches)	1	0:08
	James Doolan	def.	Paul Cowzer	Submission (Rear-Naked Choke)	1	1:04
	Tom Maguire	def.	Nicklas Zackrisson	Submission (Rear-Naked Choke)	2	0:35
	Greg Loughran	def.	Owen Dempsey	Submission (Armbar)	1	2:56
	Tom Haddock	def.	John Donnelly	Submission (Rear-Naked Choke)	1	2:05
	Ryan White	def.	Karl Roche	TKO (Punches)	1	0:13
	Owen Roddy	def.	Kevin McAlonan	TKO (Punches)	1	2:25
	Paul McVeigh	def.	Neil Seery	Submission (Rear-Naked Choke)	1	1:10
	Mark O'Toole	def.	Geoff Hayes	Submission (Armbar)	2	1:24
	Alan Hannon	def.	Willy Hamill	KO (Punch)	1	0:25
	Driss El Bakara	def.	Gintarius Dominski	Submission (Rear-Naked Choke)	2	3:31
	Jack Magee	def.	Clive Staunton	Submission (Rear-Naked Choke)	1	3:45

== Cage Rage Contenders 5 ==
Cage Rage Contenders 5 was an event held on June 16, 2007, at Wembley Arena in London, United Kingdom.

=== Results ===
Main Card
Weight class				Method	Round	Time	Notes
	Che Mills	def.	Afnan Saeed	TKO (Punches)	1	1:22
	Gaz Roriston	def.	Darren Guisha	TKO (Submission to punches)	1	4:41
	Dorlan O'Malley	def.	Robert Powell	Submission (Guillotine Choke)	2	3:04
	John Maguire	def.	Jake Bostwick	TKO (Punches)	1	N/A
	Francis Heagney	def.	Wesley Murch	Submission (Guillotine Choke)	2	N/A
	Steve Dossett	def.	Dan Movahedi	Submission (Guillotine Choke)	1	0:53
	John Hathaway	def.	Tarcio Santana	Decision (Unanimous)	3	5:00
	John Haggerty	def.	Michael King	TKO (Punches)	1	4:30
	Kym Farid	def.	Marius Liaukevicius	TKO (Punches)	1	3:05
	Luke Smith	def.	Jay Gilbey	Submission (Rear-Naked Choke)	1	1:52
	Brett Bassett	def.	Nick Porter	TKO (Submission to punches)	2	4:40
	Scott Jansen	def.	Deano Durant	TKO (Punches)	1	1:00
	Mark Smith	def.	Jody Cottham	Submission (Armbar)	1	0:53
	Giorgio Andrews	def.	Max Henchy	Submission (Rear-Naked Choke)	1	1:52

== Cage Rage 22 ==
Cage Rage 22 was an event held on July 14, 2007, at Wembley Arena in London, United Kingdom.

=== Results ===
Main Card
Weight class				Method	Round	Time	Notes
	Tengiz Tedoradze	def.	Eric Esch	TKO (Punches)	1	4:26
	Dave Legeno	def.	Herb Dean	TKO (Eye Injury)	1	5:00
	Neil Grove	def.	James Thompson	KO (Punch)	1	0:10
	Mario Sperry	def.	Lee Hasdell	Submission (Rear Naked Choke)	1	1:39
	Gary Turner	def.	Edson Claas Vieira	TKO (Corner Stoppage)	2	5:00
Light Heavyweight	Paul Cahoon	def.	Mark Epstein	Decision (Unanimous)	3	5:00	(Note: For the British Light Heavyweight Championship.)
	James McSweeney	def.	Mark Buchanan	TKO (Punches)	1	1:30
Featherweight	Robbie Olivier (c)	def.	Ronnie Mann	Decision (Unanimous)	3	5:00	(Note: For the British Featherweight Championship.)
	Marius Zaromskis	def.	Ross Mason	KO (Flying Knee)	3	2:03
	Ross Pointon	def.	Dean Bray	Submission (Guillotine Choke)	2	2:10
	Michael Johnson	def.	Damien Riccio	TKO (Broken Nose)	2	5:00
	Tom Watson	def.	Ed Smith	Decision (Unanimous)	3	5:00

== Cage Rage Contenders 6 ==
Cage Rage Contenders 6 was an event held on August 18, 2007, in London, United Kingdom.

=== Results ===
Main Card
Weight class				Method	Round	Time	Notes
	Brad Pickett	def.	Vaughan Lee	TKO (Punches)	3	3:20
	Matt Ewin	def.	Leo Negao	DQ	0	N/A
	John Maguire	def.	Jake Bostwick	Submission (Kimura)	1	4:00
	Mark Buchanan	def.	Kev Sims	Submission (Armbar)	1	1:01
	John Hathaway	def.	Charles Barbosa	Decision (Unanimous)	3	5:00
	Jeff Hayes	def.	Kym Farid	Submission (Rear-Naked Choke)	1	3:57
	Luke Smith	def.	Will Russell	Submission (Triangle Choke)	1	3:33
	Jarred Ferre	def.	Scott Jansen	Submission (Guillotine Choke)	2	0:48
	Mark Smith	def.	Michael King	KO (Punch)	1	0:15
	Glen Winslade	def.	Jack Magee	TKO (Punches)	2	1:32
	James Elson	def.	Steve Dossett	KO (Punches)	2	1:15
	Mark Tucker	def.	Steven Elliott	Submission (Armbar)	3	1:50
	Jody Cottham	def.	Danny Beevor	Submission (Armbar)	1	2:30

== Cage Rage 23 ==
Cage Rage 23 was an event held on September 22, 2007, at Wembley Arena in London, United Kingdom.

=== Results ===
Main Card
Weight class				Method	Round	Time	Notes
	Gary Turner	def.	Julius Francis	TKO (Submission to punches)	2	2:17
Heavyweight	Vitor Belfort	def.	James Zikic (c)	Decision (Unanimous)	3	5:00	(Note: For the World Light Heavyweight Championship.)
Welterweight	Paul Daley	def.	Mark Weir	TKO (Punches)	2	2:14	(Note: For the World Welterweight Championship.)
	Jean Silva	def.	Chris Brennan	TKO (Punches)	2	2:26
Heavyweight	Tengiz Tedoradze (c)	def.	Mostapha Al-Turk	Decision (Unanimous)	3	5:00	(Note: For the British Heavyweight Championship.)
	Xavier Foupa-Pokam	def.	Pierre Guillet	KO (Kick to the Body)	1	1:02
Middleweight	Matt Ewin	def.	Alex Reid	Decision (Unanimous)	3	5:00	(Note: For the British Middleweight Championship.)
	Neil Grove	def.	Domagoj Ostojic	TKO (Punches)	1	0:34
	Roman Webber	def.	Ed Smith	Decision (Unanimous)	3	5:00
	Che Mills	def.	Ross Mason	Submission (Rear-Naked Choke)	1	2:07

== Cage Rage Contenders: Dynamite ==
Cage Rage Contenders: Dynamite was an event held on September 29, 2007, at National Stadium in Dublin, Ireland.

=== Results ===
Main Card
Weight class				Method	Round	Time	Notes
	Samy Schiavo	def.	Paul Jenkins	Submission (Arm Triangle Choke)	1	4:06
	Karl Roche	def.	Andy Foreman	Submission (Verbal)	1	1:33
	Bendy Casimir	def.	Daniel Thomas	Submission (Guillotine Choke)	1	3:19
	Gunnar Nelson	def.	Driss El Bakara	Submission (Armbar)	1	3:46
	Tomas Murnikas	def.	Gintarius Dominski	Submission (Ankle Lock)	1	4:37
	Aisling Daly	def.	Majanka Lathouwers	Submission (Armbar)	2	4:43
	Charles Flemming	def.	Marius Simanaitis	Submission (Rear Naked Choke)	1	1:34
	Willy Hamill	def.	Martin Begley	Submission (Rear Naked Choke)	1	4:37
	Michael Leonard	def.	Phil Harris	Submission (Triangle Choke)	1	1:25

== Cage Rage Contenders 7 ==
Cage Rage Contenders 7 was an event held on November 10, 2007, at The Troxy in London, United Kingdom.

=== Results ===
Main Card
Weight class				Method	Round	Time	Notes
	John Hathaway	def.	Tommy Maguire	TKO (Punches)	2	3:17
	James Elson	def.	Jake Bostwick	Submission (Rear Naked Choke)	1	0:00
	Michael Pastou	def.	Dimitri O'Malley	Submission (Armbar)	1	0:00
	Charlie Francis	def.	Glen Winslade	TKO (Punches)	1	0:00
	Denniston Sutherland	def.	Saieed Gholamie	KO (Punch)	2	0:00
	Jason Young	def.	Michael King	TKO (Punches)	2	0:48
	Scott Jansen	def.	Jody Cottham	KO	1	0:10
	Mark Smith	def.	Dave Wood	Submission (Rear Naked Choke)	1	0:47
	Sami Berik	def.	Danny Fletcher	TKO (Punches)	1	0:00
	Jack Mason	def.	Edgelson Lua	Submission (Arm Triangle Choke)	3	0:00
	Giorgio Andrews	def.	Danny Beevor	TKO (Punches)	1	0:00

== Cage Rage Contenders: Wales ==
Cage Rage Contenders: Wales was an event held on November 18, 2007, at Brangwyn Hall in Swansea, United Kingdom.

=== Results ===
Main Card
Weight class				Method	Round	Time	Notes
	John Phillips	def.	Christos Petroutsos	TKO	1	0:00
	Jordan James	def.	Ronny Janmaat	KO	1	0:00
	Roman Webber	def.	Sandor Torak	KO	1	0:00
	Potielli Rossi	def.	Mathew Jones	Submission (Triangle Choke)	1	0:00
	Alex Evans	def.	Dean Lewis	TKO	1	0:00
	Simon Boulter	def.	Bobby Thomas	Submission (Rear Naked Choke)	1	0:00
	Joe Jones	def.	Ross Mould	TKO	2	0:00
	Lola Bamgbala	def.	Mark Brown	Submission (Rear Naked Choke)	1	0:00
	Craig Payne	def.	Gavin Gates	KO	1	0:00
	Russell Evans	def.	Nick Orchard	Submission (Rear Naked Choke)	1	0:00

== Cage Rage 24 ==
Cage Rage 24 was an event held on December 1, 2007, at Wembley Arena in London, United Kingdom.

=== Results ===
Main Card
Weight class				Method	Round	Time	Notes
	Murilo Rua	def.	Xavier Foupa-Pokam	Submission (Rear-Naked Choke)	2	3:47
	Paul Cahoon	def.	Elvis Sinosic	TKO (Punches)	1	0:21
	Drew Fickett	def.	Mark Weir	Submission (Rear-Naked Choke)	1	3:55
	Marius Zaromskis	def.	Ross Pointon	TKO (Doctor Stoppage)	2	3:39
	Mark Epstein	def.	Tom Watson	Decision (Split)	3	5:00
	Mark Buchanan	def.	George Castro	TKO (Punches)	2	3:17
	Neil Grove	def.	Robert Berry	TKO (Corner Stoppage)	1	5:00
	Ivan Serati	def.	Lee Hasdell	Submission (Rear-Naked Choke)	2	1:34
Lightweight	Abdul Mohamed (c)	def.	Robbie Olivier	Decision (Majority)	3	5:00	(Note: For the British Lightweight Championship.)
	Robert Paczkow	def.	James McSweeney	Submission (Smother Choke)	1	2:09
	Ronnie Mann	def.	Jordan Miller	Submission (Triangle Choke)	1	0:53

== See also ==
- Cage Rage Championships
- List of Cage Rage champions
- List of Cage Rage events
