= Gerald Strebendt =

American mixed martial arts fighter

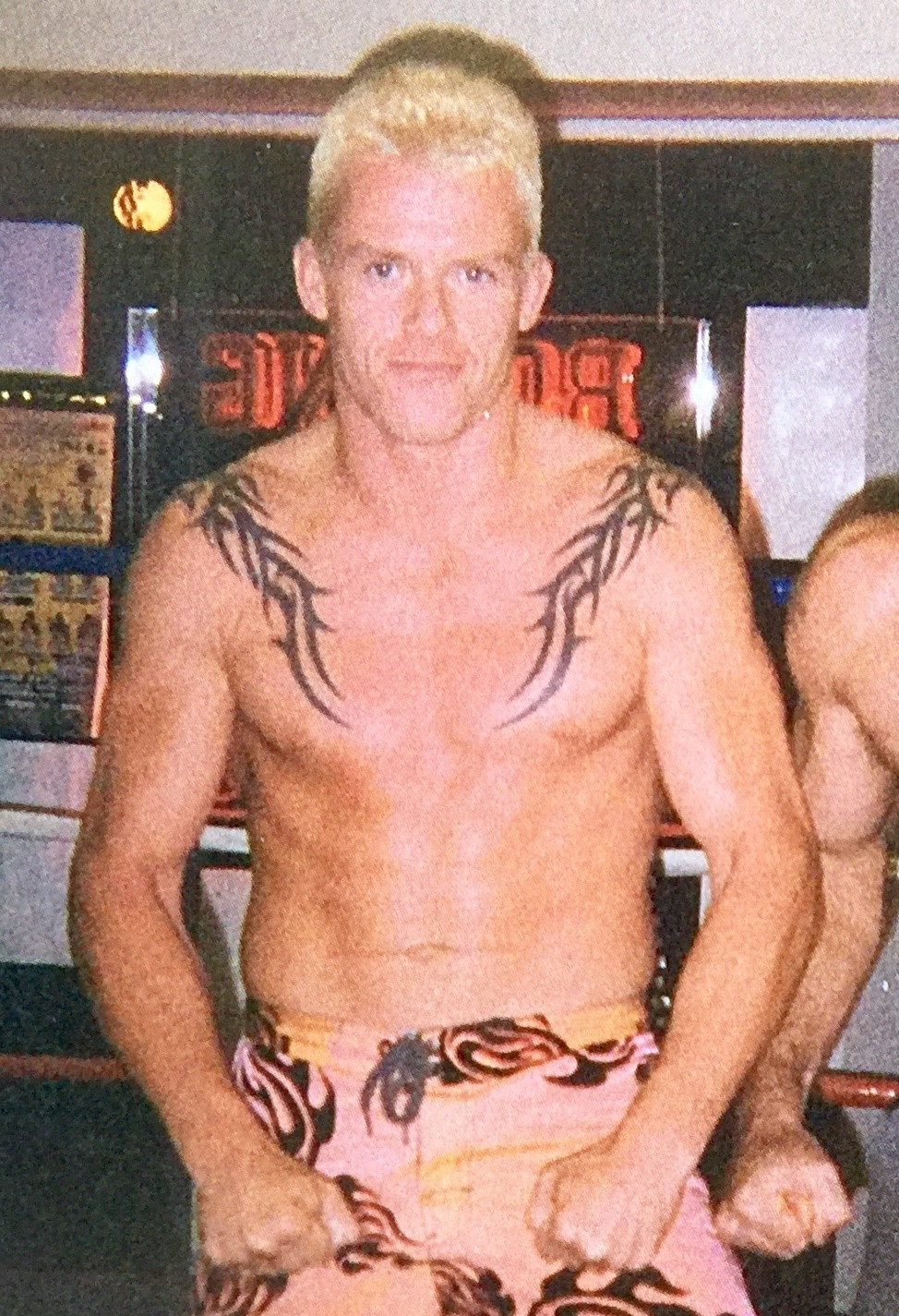
- Strebendt, c. 2002
- Born: Gerald Ray Strebendt; March 1, 1979 (age 47); Coos Bay, Oregon, U.S.
- Other names: Bangkok Ready; The Finishing Machine
- Height: 5 ft 9 in (1.75 m)
- Weight: 154 lb (70 kg; 11.0 st)
- Division: Lightweight
- Fighting out of: Los Angeles, California, U.S.
- Team: 10th Planet Jiu-Jitsu
- Years active: 2001–2008

Mixed martial arts record
- Total: 16
- Wins: 9
- By knockout: 1
- By submission: 8
- Losses: 7
- By knockout: 4
- By submission: 3

Other information
- Mixed martial arts record from Sherdog

Gerald Ray Strebendt (born March 1, 1979) is an American retired professional mixed martial artist. A professional competitor from 2001 until 2008, he fought for the UFC and Cage Rage. He is the former Cage Rage World lightweight champion.

== Career ==
A former member of the United States Marine Corps, Strebendt is known for being the first student of the now world-renowned Brazilian Jiu-jitsu practitioner, Eddie Bravo where he adopted Eddie's rubber guard, and twister game. In 2004 he became the first fighter to execute a twister in an MMA match.

Strebendt was a key witness in the 2005 murder trial of Rafiel Torre. Torre, whose real name is Ralph Bartel, initially offered Strebendt $10,000 to kill the victim, 32-year-old Bryan Richards, who had a sizable life insurance policy and with whose wife Torre was having an affair. After Strebendt refused, Torre committed the murder himself, then told Strebendt a few days later that he had killed Richards in self-defense with a rear naked choke. Torre asked Strebendt to provide him with an alibi, a request which was met with Strebendt's refusal. More than a year after the killing, Strebendt voluntarily came forward and provided his story to detectives, out of concern that Torre would escape punishment for the murder. Torre was convicted of the murder and sentenced to life in prison without the possibility of parole; he is appealing the sentence.

On January 29, 2014, Strebendt shot and killed 53-year-old David Paul Crofut, also of Springfield, during an altercation following a traffic collision between the two drivers' vehicles. Strebendt called 911 following the collision but before shooting Crofut and was still connected with the 911 call when the shot was fired. Strebendt claims self-defense in the shooting; Strebendt's attorney, Mike Arnold of Eugene, states that Strebendt reached into his vehicle and retrieved his weapon, a loaded .223 caliber semi-automatic rifle, because Crofut verbally threatened his life. Carrying a loaded rifle in a vehicle is legal in Oregon. Crofut was unarmed during the altercation, and no weapons other than Strebendt's rifle were found at the scene. Following the shooting, Strebendt was handcuffed and taken into custody, but was released later that night. According to Strebendt on the 911 call, Crofut hit him "on purpose with his vehicle." Strebendt can be heard on the 911 call instructing Crofut to "back away" and "don't fucking come near me." At the time of his death, Crofut had a blood alcohol content of 0.156%. The legal limit for driving under the influence of alcohol in Oregon is 0.08%.

Strebendt was arrested and charged with murder on March 6, 2014, after a grand jury indictment. On May 21, 2015, the murder charge was dismissed and Strebendt pleaded guilty to criminally negligent homicide due to police establishing "some mitigating evidence" favoring Strebendt. His attorney Mike Arnold and co-counsel Emilia Gardner went on to write a book about Strebendt and the case called Finishing Machine. He was released from state prison in 2017.

Eight months after his release from prison, Strebendt was arrested for allegedly sexually abusing an underage female on April 25, 2018. He was later sentenced by courts in Lane County, OR to two years and four months in prison with two years and eight months of probation.

== Mixed martial arts record ==
Professional record breakdown
16 matches	9 wins	7 losses
By knockout	1	4
By submission	8	3

Res.	Record	Opponent	Method	Event	Date	Round	Time	Location	Notes
Loss	9–7	Lyle Beerbohm	Submission (injury)	EWC 3: Capitol Invasion	January 12, 2008	1	2:42	Salem, Oregon, U.S.	
Win	9–6	Will Shutt	Submission (rear-naked choke)	SF 20: Homecoming	October 27, 2007	1	N/A	Portland, Oregon, U.S.	
Loss	8–6	Vítor Ribeiro	Submission (guillotine choke)	Cage Rage 12	July 12, 2005	1	1:13	London, England	
Loss	8–5	Sean Sherk	TKO (punches)	Extreme Challenge 58	June 11, 2004	1	3:52	Medina, Minnesota, U.S.	
Loss	8–4	Jean Silva	Submission (triangle choke)	Cage Rage 6	May 23, 2004	2	N/A	London, England	For the vacant Cage Rage World Lightweight Championship.
Win	8–3	Dave Elliot	Submission (twister)	Cage Warriors 7: Showdown	May 9, 2004	1	0:48	Barnsley, England	
Win	7–3	Pat Carr	Submission (rear-naked choke)	XFC 2: The Perfect Storm	November 9, 2003	4	4:53	Cornwall, England	
Loss	6–3	Josh Thomson	KO (punches)	UFC 44	September 26, 2003	1	2:45	Las Vegas, Nevada, U.S.	
Win	6–2	Jean Silva	Submission (rear-naked choke)	Cage Rage 2	February 22, 2003	1	N/A	London, England	Won the vacant Cage Rage World Lightweight Championship.
Win	5–2	Carmelo Serrato	Submission (rear-naked choke)	Ultimate Cage Fighting 1	May 9, 2002	1	N/A	Los Angeles, California, U.S.	
Loss	4–2	Charles Bennett	TKO (submission to punches)	GC 7: Casualties of War	November 4, 2001	1	1:40	Colusa, California, U.S.	
Win	4–1	Noah Shinable	TKO (cut)	GC 6: Caged Beasts	September 9, 2001	1	4:23	Colusa, California, U.S.	
Win	3–1	Aaron Anderson	Submission (triangle choke)	GC 5: Rumble in the Rockies	August 19, 2001	N/A	N/A	Denver, Colorado, U.S.	
Win	2–1	Mike Meto	Submission (armbar)	Kage Kombat	July 9, 2001	1	1:52	San Pedro, Los Angeles, California, U.S.	
Loss	1–1	Eiji Mitsuoka	TKO (submission to punches)	KOTC 9: Showtime	June 23, 2001	1	2:23	San Jacinto, California, U.S.	
Win	1–0	Aaron Herring	Submission (armbar)	Bushido 2	April 21, 2001	1	2:54	Yokohama, Japan	
