= Jess Liaudin =

French mixed martial arts fighter (born 1973)

- Born: 21 December 1973 (age 52); Evry, France
- Nationality: French
- Height: 5 ft 10 in (1.78 m)
- Weight: 155 lb (70 kg; 11.1 st)
- Division: Middleweight; Welterweight; Lightweight
- Style: Kickboxing, Muay Thai, Shootboxing, Sambo, Brazilian jiu-jitsu
- Fighting out of: London, England
- Team: Pancrase London
- Years active: 2000-2012 (MMA); 1990-2014 (Kickboxing/Muay Thai)

Kickboxing record
- Total: 22
- Wins: 19
- By knockout: 12
- Losses: 3

Mixed martial arts record
- Total: 31
- Wins: 20
- By knockout: 5
- By submission: 12
- By decision: 3
- Losses: 11
- By knockout: 6
- By submission: 1
- By decision: 4

Jess Liaudin (born 21 December 1973) is a French mixed martial artist, kickboxer and film actor. A professional MMA competitor from 1990 until 2014, he competed for UFC, Pancrase, Cage Rage, and King of the Cage.

== Background ==
Liaudin trained in martial arts from eight years old; in karate initially and then moving on to kickboxing. From the age of 16, he has been fighting in a variety of full-contact competitions. He has fought in over 84 amateur and professional fights in mixed martial arts, Muay Thai, and kickboxing.

== Mixed martial arts career ==
=== Early career ===
Liaudin began his professional MMA career in 2000 as a Middleweight, compiling a 6–0 record before facing his first defeat.

=== Ultimate Fighting Championship ===
Liaudin signed to the UFC upon the heels of a three-fight winning streak, facing Dennis Siver at UFC 70. Liaudin defeated Siver in the first round with an armbar one minute and twenty-one seconds into the fight.

After another first-round stoppage via TKO over Anthony Torres at UFC 75, Liaudin was scheduled to face Anthony Johnson at UFC 80. However, the bout was scrapped due to a hand injury Johnson suffered during training, and Liaudin instead returned at UFC 85 against Marcus Davis. Liaudin was knocked out in the first round.

After dropping a split decision to Paul Taylor at UFC 85, Liaudin then returned to the Lightweight division, facing David Bielkheden at UFC 89. Liaudin lost via unanimous decision, and was subsequently released from the promotion.

=== Post-UFC ===
Liaudin had a successful remainder of his career after the UFC, winning his final six fights.

== Filmography ==
- 1997, Coca-Cola (TV commercial), Medieval sword fight/special action performer
- 1997, The Imax Nutcracker/Sands Films, Toy & Mouse (stunt)
- 2010, "Six degrees/Short Film", Tattoo artist
- 2010, "South Central/Day I Die" (Clip video), (Stunt)
- 2010, The Perpetrators/Dutiful Films ltd, Camou
- 2010, For Kai/SnowPix Productions, "Mr Ashbeck"
- 2011, The Sweeney, Pool Hall Bouncer (uncredited)
- 2011, Snow white and the Huntsman, "The shadow army/special action performer"
- 2011, Le Mentor de "Jean-Pierre Mocky", Le Bonimenteur
- 2011, Four of a Kind/Short Film – Offkey Production, The Holiday maker
- 2011, Different Perspectives – Brainbox Films & Red Clover Productions, Matheus
- 2011, Ivryse – "Line up the stars" (Clip video)/ Davey inc, Russian gangster
- 2012, Thor: The Dark World, Stunt performer
- 2014, The Albion Falls/Short film, Jonah
- 2015, A hitman in London/Raging Pictures(Skin Traffik), Sergei's Associate
- 2015, The Squad, Waked
- 2016, Exterminatus/Short Film, Judge Garrat
- 2016, Night Fare, the driver
- 2018, Submergence, Marcel
- 2018, Holmes and Watson, The executioner
- 2018, Big Brother/Bullet Films, David Jones
- 2018, Holmes & Watson, Hangman
- 2019, Anna, EuropaCorp, Olga's technician
- 2019, Maleficent: Mistress of Evil, Tundra Warrior Fey
- 2021, One Shot, Hakim Charef
- 2022, Irma Vep, TV miniseries, Satanas
- 2023, Luther: The Fallen Sun, Nilsson
- 2023, One Ranger, Oleg Jakovenko
- 2023, Ganapath, Tabahi
- 2024, Lift, Arthur Tigue
- 2024, Nice Girls, Bauer
- 2024, Paris Has Fallen, Fake RAID Officer in Lift (uncredited)
- 2025, Back in Action, Pascal
- 2025, Hotel Costiera, Le Bris
- 2026, Above & Below, TBA
- Other work: The Bill/Talkback Thames, Streetdance 2 3D, B Monkey, Elephant juice.

== Championships ==
- South East USA Kickboxing Champion (1993)
- UK Open Sambo Tournament Silver medal (2001)
- European Brazilian jiu-jitsu & Grappling Championship (Fr) Silver medal (2001)
- Knock Down Sport Budo International Champion (2001)
- European Cage Combat Middleweight Champion (2003)
- Shootboxing Japan "S-of the world vol 5" Winner (2003)
- Long beach – World no gi Bronze medal (2007)
- Welterweight World Title 77 kg- 10th Legion C F (2009)

== Mixed martial arts record ==
Professional record breakdown
31 matches	20 wins	11 losses
By knockout	5	6
By submission	12	1
By decision	3	4

Res.	Record	Opponent	Method	Event	Date	Round	Time	Location	Notes
Win	20–11	Juan Manuel Suarez	TKO (punches)	Tenth Legion: Victorious	13 May 2012	2	4:51	London, England	
Win	19–11	Rafael Silva	Decision (unanimous)	10th Legion VII: Invasion of Warriors	13 March 2011	3	5:00	London, England	
Win	18–11	Manu Garcia	Submission (guillotine choke)	100% Fight 2	13 March 2010	1	0:30	Paris, France	
Win	17–11	Bernueng Sakhomsin	Submission (armbar)	KMMA: MMA & Muay Thai Grand Extreme	7 November 2009	3	5:00	Macau, China	
Win	16–11	Lee Doski	Decision (unanimous)	ASF 4	18 April 2009	3	5:00	Paris, France	
Win	15–11	Peter Irving	TKO (punches)	10th Legion: The War Machine	5 April 2009	1	4:06	Hull, England	
Loss	14–11	David Bielkheden	Decision (unanimous)	UFC 89	18 October 2008	3	5:00	Birmingham, England	Return to Lightweight.
Loss	14–10	Paul Taylor	Decision (split)	UFC 85	6 June 2008	3	5:00	London, England	
Loss	14–9	Marcus Davis	KO (punch)	UFC 80	19 January 2008	1	1:04	Newcastle, England	
Win	14–8	Anthony Torres	TKO (punches)	UFC 75	8 September 2007	1	4:10	London, England	
Win	13–8	Dennis Siver	Submission (armbar)	UFC 70	21 April 2007	1	1:21	Manchester, England	
Win	12–8	Ross Mason	Submission (heel hook)	Cage Rage 19	9 December 2006	1	2:55	England	
Win	11–8	Lee Doski	TKO (corner stoppage)	Cage Rage Contenders 2	20 August 2006	2	5:00	London, England	
Win	10–8	Paul Jenkins	KO (punch)	ZT: Fight Night	19 February 2006	1	4:05	England	
Loss	9–8	Hidetaka Monma	Submission (armbar)	GCM: D.O.G. 3	17 September 2005	1	2:14	Tokyo, Japan	
Loss	9–7	Abdul Mohamed	TKO (doctor stoppage)	Cage Rage 11	30 April 2005	1	5:00	England	
Win	9–6	Mike Tomson	Submission (ankle lock)	Shoot-Fighting FC	17 April 2005	1	0:13	England	
Win	8–6	Andy Walker	Submission (heel hook)	P & G: Clash in Consett 4	2 April 2005	1	2:09	England	
Loss	7–6	Paul Daley	TKO (doctor stoppage)	Cage Rage 9	27 November 2004	1	5:00	England	
Loss	7–5	Matt Ewin	TKO (doctor stoppage)	Cage Rage 7	10 July 2004	2	3:42	England	
Loss	7–4	Shonie Carter	Decision (unanimous)	Cage Wars	30 May 2004	3	5:00	Ireland	Return to Welterweight.
Loss	7–3	Paul Taylor	Decision (unanimous)	Cage Rage 2	22 February 2003	3	5:00	England	Lightweight debut.
Win	7–2	Shain Tovell	Submission (heel hook)	UZI 1: Cage Combat Evolution	30 November 2002	1	0:56	England	
Loss	6–2	Joey Guel	TKO (corner stoppage)	KOTC 15: Bad Intentions	22 June 2002	1	2:31	California, United States	
Loss	6–1	Marcos da Silva	TKO (doctor stoppage)	Cage Wars 2	15 May 2002	1	5:00	England	
Win	6–0	Paul Seney	Submission (punches)	Vale Tudo FC	25 November 2001	2	N/A	England	
Win	5–0	Rob Miller	Submission (triangle choke)	UKMMAC 1: Sudden Impact	11 November 2001	1	1:03	England	
Win	4–0	Dave Ives	Submission (toe hold)	KSBO: International	17 June 2001	1	N/A	England	
Win	3–0	Guy Stainthorp	Submission (triangle choke)	KSBO: International	17 June 2001	1	N/A	England	
Win	2–0	Chris Collins	Submission (armlock)	Hasdell Competition	9 June 2001	1	0:58	England	
Win	1–0	Moise Rimbon	Decision (1–0 points)	Pancrase: Pancrase UK	25 November 2000	N/A	N/A	England	
