= Mostapha al-Turk =

Lebanese mixed martial arts fighter

- Born: 14 July 1973 (age 53); Beirut, Lebanon
- Native name: مصطفى الترك
- Nationality: English
- Height: 6 ft 2 in (188 cm)
- Weight: 235 lb (107 kg; 16 st 11 lb)
- Division: Heavyweight
- Reach: 77.5 in (197 cm)
- Fighting out of: London, England
- Team: London Shootfighters
- Years active: 2002–2010

Mixed martial arts record
- Total: 12
- Wins: 6
- By knockout: 6
- Losses: 6
- By knockout: 3
- By submission: 1
- By decision: 2

Other information
- Mixed martial arts record from Sherdog

Mostapha al-Turk (Arabic: مصطفى الترك, born 14 July 1973) is a retired Lebanese mixed martial artist. A professional from 2002 until 2010, he competed for the UFC and Cage Rage. He is the former Cage Rage British heavyweight champion.

== Background ==
Born in Beirut, Lebanon, al-Turk and his family moved back and forth between London and Beirut when he was still a toddler. al-Turk had become interested in mixed martial arts after watching a few UFC and PRIDE FC events. He briefly worked in the pharmaceutical industry, before deciding to make mixed martial arts his career. al-Turk was the ADCC European Champion in 2005, going on to compete at the ADCC Submission Wrestling World Championship, losing to future UFC fighter Gabriel Gonzaga by points in the first round.

== Mixed martial arts career ==
=== Early career ===
Before going professional, al-Turk had 2 amateur fights.

=== Cage Rage ===
Al-Turk fought in the British organization, Cage Rage, around a year after losing his second professional bout. Al-Turk faced former two-time UFC Heavyweight Tournament Champion and longtime PRIDE veteran Mark Kerr. al-Turk again won by punches after the former collegiate wrestling star tapped out due to punches. Al-Turk then fought against former British Cage Rage Heavyweight Champion Tengiz Tedoradze. Al-Turk lost the fight by decision.

Al-Turk continued to perform with a win over K-1 kickboxer Gary Turner, who tapped due to punches landed by the Lebanese fighter. al-Turk then fought for the British Cage Rage Heavyweight Championship against future Ultimate Fighter contestant, James McSweeney. al-Turk won the fight by TKO due to punches and became the last British Cage Rage Heavyweight Champion, before the organization saw its demise. al-Turk was then offered a four-fight contract in the UFC, which he accepted.

=== UFC ===
At UFC 92, on 27 December 2008, Turk lost at his UFC debut to French kickboxer Cheick Kongo by TKO. Kongo dropped Turk with two right hands, using the ground and pound technique, he knocked out Al-Turk

Al-Turk next lost to Mirko Cro Cop at UFC 99 by TKO after Cro Cop hammered him with strikes following an eye poke. There was controversy surrounding the end of this fight as Cro Cop had poked Al-Turk in the eye (which forced Al Turk to stop fighting) right before he succumbed to punches, however the referee failed to notice it during the fight. Al-Turk stated that he would petition the loss, but the petition was declined.

Al-Turk was expected to face UFC newcomer Rolles Gracie on 6 February 2010 at UFC 109, but pulled out due to visa issues.

al-Turk instead faced The Ultimate Fighter 10 alumni, Jon Madsen, at UFC 112. Turk lost the bout via unanimous decision and was subsequently released by the UFC.

== Championships and accomplishments ==
- Cage Rage
  - Cage Rage British Heavyweight Championship (One Time, Last)

== Mixed martial arts record ==
Professional record breakdown
12 matches	6 wins	6 losses
By knockout	6	3
By submission	0	1
By decision	0	2

Res.	Record	Opponent	Method	Event	Date	Round	Time	Location	Notes
Loss	6–6	Jon Madsen	Decision (unanimous)	UFC 112	10 April 2010	3	5:00	Abu Dhabi, United Arab Emirates	
Loss	6–5	Mirko Cro Cop	TKO (punches)	UFC 99	13 June 2009	1	3:06	Cologne, Germany	
Loss	6–4	Cheick Kongo	TKO (elbows and punches)	UFC 92	27 December 2008	1	4:37	Las Vegas, Nevada, United States	
Win	6–3	James McSweeney	TKO (punches)	Cage Rage 27	12 July 2008	1	2:06	London, England	
Win	5–3	Gary Turner	TKO (submission to punches)	Cage Rage 25	8 March 2008	1	3:19	London, England	
Loss	4–3	Tengiz Tedoradze	Decision (unanimous)	Cage Rage 23	22 September 2007	3	3:26	London, England	
Win	4–2	Mark Kerr	TKO (submission to punches)	Cage Rage 20	10 February 2007	1	2:29	London, England	
Win	3–2	Henry Armstrong Miller	TKO (punches)	Cage Rage 18	30 September 2006	1	0:56	London, England	
Win	2–2	Martin Thompson	TKO (punches)	Cage Rage 16	22 April 2006	1	3:02	London, England	
Win	1–2	Fereidoun Naghizadeh	TKO (punches)	Cage Rage 9 - No Mercy	27 November 2004	1	2:25	London, England	
Loss	0–2	Kassim Annan	Submission (armbar)	XFC 2 - The Perfect Storm	9 November 2003	1	N/A	Cornwall, England	
Loss	0–1	Mike Ward	TKO (punches)	XFC 1 - Xtreme Fighting Championship 1	3 March 2002	1	1:00	Cornwall, England	
