= List of Cage Rage champions =

Below is a list of Cage Rage champions at each weight class.

== World Championship ==
=== Heavyweight Championship ===
Weight limit: Unlimited

No.	Name	Event	Date	Defenses
Title known as Cage Rage Heavyweight Championship
1	(England) Mark Epstein def. Lance King	Cage Rage 5 Streatham, England	Feb 15, 2004	
2	(England) Ian Freeman def. Ryan Robinson	Cage Rage 9 London, England	Nov 27, 2004	
On 27 September 2004, Ian Freeman immediately vacates title and signals intention to drop to light heavyweight.
Title now known as Cage Rage World Heavyweight Championship
3	(Brazil) Antônio Silva def. Rafael Carino	Cage Rage 12; London, England	Jul 2, 2005	

=== Light Heavyweight Championship ===
Weight limit: 210 lb (95.3 kg)

No.	Name	Event	Date	Defenses
Title known as Cage Rage Light Heavyweight Championship
1	(England) Mark Epstein def. Glen Appleby	Cage Rage 6 Streatham, England	May 23, 2004	
2	(England) Michael Bisping	Cage Rage 7 London, England	Jul 10, 2004	1. def. Mark Epstein at Cage Rage 9 on Nov 27, 2004
In September 2005, Michael Bisping is stripped of the title due to a dispute between Cage Rage and Bisping's management.
Title now known as Cage Rage World Light Heavyweight Championship
3	(Netherlands) Melvin Manhoef def. Fabio Piamonte	Cage Rage 13; London, England	Sep 10, 2005	1. def. Evangelista Santos at Cage Rage 15 on Feb 4, 2006; 2. def. Ian Freeman at Cage Rage 17 on Jul 1, 2006
Title vacated when Manhoef signed with K-1.
4	(England) James Zikic def. Evangelista Santos	Cage Rage 21; London, England	Apr 21, 2007	
Zikic vacated.
5	(Brazil) Vitor Belfort def. James Zikic	Cage Rage 23; London, England	Sep 22, 2007	

=== Middleweight Championship ===
Weight limit: 185 lb (83.9 kg)

No.	Name	Event	Date	Defenses
Title known as Cage Rage Middleweight Championship
1	(Wales) Paul Jenkins def. Gaz Roriston	Cage Rage 3 Streatham, England	Jun 8, 2003	1. def. Ian Pyatt at Cage Rage 4 on Oct 12, 2003; 2. drew with Suley Mahmoud at Cage Rage 5 on Feb 15, 2004; 3. drew with Suley Mahmoud at Cage Rage 6 on May 23, 2004
In July 2004, Paul Jenkins drops to welterweight, defeats Ronaldo Campos for the welterweight title and vacates middleweight title.
Title now known as Cage Rage World Middleweight Title
2	(Brazil) Anderson Silva def. Lee Murray	Cage Rage 8 London, England	Sep 11, 2004	1. def. Jorge Rivera at Cage Rage 11 on Ap 30, 2005; 2. def. Curtis Stout at Cage Rage 14 on Dec 3, 2005; 3. def. Tony Fryklund at Cage Rage 16 on Apr 22, 2006
Silva vacated to compete for the UFC.

=== Welterweight Championship ===
Weight limit: 170 lb (77.1 kg)

No.	Name	Event	Date	Defenses
1	(United States) Chris Lytle def. Ross Mason	Cage Rage 15; London, England	Feb 4, 2006	
Title vacated due to Chris Lytle's contract with the UFC and Cage Rage's desire to reactivate the title.
2	(England) Paul Daley def. Mark Weir	Cage Rage 23; London, England	Sep 22, 2007	

=== Lightweight Championship ===
Weight limit: 155 lb (70.3 kg)

No.	Name	Event	Date	Defenses
Title known as Cage Rage Lightweight Championship
1	(United States) Gerald Strebendt def. Jean Silva	Cage Rage 2 London, England	Feb 22, 2003	
2	(Brazil) Jean Silva	Cage Rage 6 Streatham, England	May 23, 2004	1. drew with Oliver Ellis at Cage Rage 7 on Jul 10, 2004; 2. def. Samy Schiavo at Cage Rage 9 on Nov 27, 2004; 3. drew with Leigh Remedios Cage Rage 10 on Feb 26, 2005
Title now known as Cage Rage World Lightweight Championship
3	(Brazil) Vítor Ribeiro def. Jean Silva	Cage Rage 13; London, England	Sep 10, 2005	1. def. Abdul Mohamed at Cage Rage 18 on Sep 30, 2006; 2. def. Daisuke Nakamura at Cage Rage 19 on Dec 9, 2006

=== Featherweight Championship ===
Weight limit: 140 lb (63.5 kg)

No.	Name	Event	Date	Defenses
1	(Japan) Masakazu Imanari def. Robbie Olivier	Cage Rage 20; London, England	Feb 10, 2007	1. def. Jean Silva at Cage Rage 25 on Mar 8, 2008

== British Championship (Symbolic title) ==
=== Heavyweight Championship ===
Weight limit: Unlimited

No.	Name	Event	Date	Defenses
1	(Georgia (country)) Tengiz Tedoradze def. Robert Berry	Cage Rage 15; London, England	Apr 22, 2006	
Tedoradze is stripped for breaking a term in his Cage Rage contract. He fought in the Netherlands 12 days before a fight and was knocked out, which was forbidden in his contract. Title vacated 24 June 2006.
2	(England) Rob Broughton def. James Thompson	Cage Rage 17; London, England	Jul 1, 2006	1. def. Robert Berry at Cage Rage 18 on Sep 30, 2006
3	(Georgia (country)) Tengiz Tedoradze (2) def. Rob Broughton	Cage Rage 20; London, England	Feb 10, 2007	1. def. Mostapha al-Turk at Cage Rage 23 on Sep 22, 2007
Tedoradze vacated.
4	(Lebanon) Mostapha al-Turk def. James McSweeney	Cage Rage 27; London, England	Jul 12, 2008	

=== Light Heavyweight Championship ===
Weight limit: 210 lb (95.3 kg)

No.	Name	Event	Date	Defenses
1	(England) Michael Bisping def. Mark Epstein	Cage Rage 9 London, England	Jul 10, 2004	
Bisping vacated.
2	(England) Mark Epstein def. Ryan Robinson	Cage Rage 16; London, England	Apr 22, 2006	
3	(England) Ian Freeman	Cage Rage 18; London, England	Sep 30, 2006	
Title vacated when Freeman retires.
4	(England) Paul Cahoon def. Mark Epstein	Cage Rage 21; London, England	Jul 14, 2007	
5	(England) Ian Freeman	Cage Rage 26; Birmingham, England	May 10, 2008	

=== Middleweight Championship ===
Weight limit: 185 lb (83.9 kg)

No.	Name	Event	Date	Defenses
1	(England) Mark Weir def. Sol Gilbert	Cage Rage 12; London, England	Jul 2, 2005	
2	(Croatia) Zelg Galesic	Cage Rage 19; London, England	Dec 9, 2006	
On August 30, 2007, title vacated when Galesic signs for HERO'S.
3	(England) Matt Ewin def. Alex Reid	Cage Rage 23; London, England	Sep 22, 2007	1. def. Mark Epstein at Cage Rage 26 on May 10, 2008

=== Welterweight Championship ===
Weight limit: 170 lb (77.1 kg)

No.	Name	Event	Date	Defenses
Title known as Cage Rage Welterweight Championship.
1	(England) Andy Cooper def. Shane Torvell	Cage Rage 2 London, England	Feb 22, 2003	
2	(Brazil) Ronaldo Campos	Cage Rage 3 Streatham, England	Jun 8, 2003	1. def. Michael Johnson at Cage Rage 5 on Feb 15, 2004
3	(Wales) Paul Jenkins	Cage Rage 7 London, England	Jul 10, 2004	1. drew with Paul Daley at Cage Rage 11 on Apr 30, 2005
Title now known as Cage Rage British Welterweight Championship
On 13 June 2006, Paul Jenkins vacated the title, citing a hand injury that prevented him from defending his title.
4	(England) Paul Daley def. Ross Mason	Cage Rage 17; London, England	Jul 1, 2006	1. def. Sol Gilbert at Cage Rage 18 on Sep 30, 2006; 2. def. Paul Jenkins at Cage Rage 21 on Apr 21, 2007; 3. def. Mark Weir at Cage Rage 23 on Sep 22, 2007
Title vacated due to Paul Daley being both British champion and World champion.
5	(England) Che Mills def. Marius Zaromskis	Cage Rage 26; Birmingham, England	May 10, 2008	

=== Lightweight Championship ===
Weight limit: 155 lb (70.3 kg)

No.	Name	Event	Date	Defenses
1	(England) Abdul Mohamed def. Alexandre Izidro	Cage Rage 13; London, England	Sep 10, 2005	1. def. Ross Pointon at Cage Rage 21 on Apr 21, 2007; 2. def. Robbie Olivier at Cage Rage 24 on Dec 1, 2007

=== Featherweight Championship ===
Weight limit: 140 lb (63.5 kg)

No.	Name	Event	Date	Defenses
Title known as Cage Rage Featherweight Title
1	(England) Pete Tiarks def. Ricky Moore	Cage Rage 4 London, England	Oct 12, 2003	1. def. Ian Butlin at Cage Rage 8 on Sep 11, 2004
October 2004, Pete Tiarks leaves MMA.
Title now known as Cage Rage British Featherweight Title
2	(England) Brad Pickett def. Ozzy Haluk	Cage Rage 13; London, England	Sep 10, 2005	1. def. Robbie Olivier at Cage Rage 15 on Apr 2, 2006
3	(England) Robbie Olivier	Cage Rage 18; London, England	Sep 30, 2006	1. def. Ronnie Mann at Cage Rage 21 on Jul 14, 2007

== See also ==
- List of PRIDE champions
- List of UFC champions
