= 2004 in Cage Rage Championships =

Information
- First date: February 15, 2004
- Last date: November 27, 2004

Events
- Total events: 5

Fights
- Total fights: 57
- Title fights: 14

Chronology
2003 in Cage Rage	2004 in Cage Rage Championships	2005 in Cage Rage

The year 2004 was the 3rd year in the history of the Cage Rage Championships, a mixed martial arts promotion based in the United Kingdom. In 2004 Cage Rage Championships held 5 events, Cage Rage 5.

== Title fights ==
Title fights in 2004
Weight class				Method	Round	Time	Event	Notes
Middleweight	Paul Jenkins (c)	vs.	Suley Mahmoud	Draw	3	5:00	Cage Rage 5	(Note: For the World Middleweight Championship.)
Heavyweight	Mark Epstein	def.	Lance King	KO (Knees and Punches)	3	1:53	Cage Rage 5	(Note: For the World Heavyweight Championship.)
Welterweight	Ronaldo Campos (c)	def.	Michael Johnson	Submission (Armbar)	1	4:10	Cage Rage 5	(Note: For the British Welterweight Championship.)
Lightweight	Jean Silva	def.	Gerald Strebendt	Submission (Triangle Choke)	2	0:00	Cage Rage 6	(Note: For the World Lightweight Championship.)
Middleweight	Paul Jenkins (c)	vs.	Suley Mahmoud	Draw	3	5:00	Cage Rage 6	(Note: For the World Middleweight Championship.)
Light Heavyweight	Mark Epstein	def.	Glen Appleby	TKO (Corner Stoppage)	2	5:00	Cage Rage 6	(Note: For the World Light Heavyweight Championship.)
Light Heavyweight	Michael Bisping	def.	Mark Epstein (c)	TKO (Punches and Knees)	2	1:27	Cage Rage 7	(Note: For the World Light Heavyweight Championship.)
Lightweight	Jean Silva (c)	vs.	Oliver Ellis	Draw	3	5:00	Cage Rage 7	(Note: For the World Lightweight Championship.)
Welterweight	Paul Jenkins	def.	Ronaldo Campos (c)	TKO (Punches to the Body)	2	2:54	Cage Rage 7	(Note: For the British Welterweight Championship.)
Middleweight	Anderson Silva	def.	Lee Murray	Decision (Unanimous)	3	5:00	Cage Rage 8	(Note: For the World Middleweight Championship.)
Featherweight	Pete Tiarks (c)	def.	Ian Butlin	Submission (Arm Triangle Choke)	3	1:45	Cage Rage 8	(Note: For the British Featherweight Championship.)
Heavyweight	Ian Freeman	def.	Ryan Robinson	TKO (Punches)	1	2:44	Cage Rage 9	(Note: For the World Heavyweight Championship.)
Light Heavyweight	Michael Bisping (c)	def.	Mark Epstein	KO (Punch)	3	4:43	Cage Rage 9	(Note: For the World Light Heavyweight Championship.)
Lightweight	Jean Silva (c)	def.	Samy Schiavo	Submission (Triangle Choke)	1	4:40	Cage Rage 9	(Note: For the World Lightweight Championship.)

== Events list ==
#	Event Title	Date	Arena	Location
9	Cage Rage 9	November 27, 2004	Wembley Conference Centre	London, United Kingdom
8	Cage Rage 8	September 11, 2004	Wembley Conference Centre	London, United Kingdom
7	Cage Rage 7	July 10, 2004	Wembley Conference Centre	London, United Kingdom
6	Cage Rage 6	May 23, 2004	Caesar's Nightclub	Streatham, United Kingdom
5	Cage Rage 5	February 15, 2004	Caesar's Nightclub	Streatham, United Kingdom

== Cage Rage 5 ==
Cage Rage 5 was an event held on February 15, 2004, at Caesar's Nightclub in Streatham, United Kingdom.

=== Results ===
Main Card
Weight class				Method	Round	Time	Notes
	Jean Silva	def.	Leigh Remedios	KO (Head Kick)	2	4:24
	Ricky Moore	def.	Benoit Derot	Submission (Kimura)	2	2:30
	Xavier Foupa-Pokam	def.	Paulo Coelho	Submission (Verbal)	2	0:00
Middleweight	Paul Jenkins (c)	vs.	Suley Mahmoud	Draw	3	5:00	(Note: For the World Middleweight Championship.)
Heavyweight	Mark Epstein	def.	Lance King	KO (Knees and Punches)	3	1:53	(Note: For the World Heavyweight Championship.)
	Samy Schiavo	def.	Paul Sutherland	TKO (Punches)	1	0:00
Welterweight	Ronaldo Campos (c)	def.	Michael Johnson	Submission (Armbar)	1	4:10	(Note: For the British Welterweight Championship.)
	Carla O'Sullivan	def.	Ruth Darbisher	Submission (Armbar)	1	2:57
	David Lee	def.	Chris Hipkiss	Submission (Rear-Naked Choke)	2	4:10
	Ian Butlin	def.	Chin Weakasingh	TKO (Punches)	3	4:35
	Danny Fletcher	def.	Steve Cunningham	Submission (Armbar)	1	1:36
	Colin Lingwood	def.	Stuart Grant	TKO	1	2:55

== Cage Rage 6 ==
Cage Rage 6 was an event held on May 23, 2004, at Caesar's Nightclub in Streatham, United Kingdom.

=== Results ===
Main Card
Weight class				Method	Round	Time	Notes
Lightweight	Jean Silva	def.	Gerald Strebendt	Submission (Triangle Choke)	2	0:00	(Note: For the World Lightweight Championship.)
Middleweight	Paul Jenkins (c)	vs.	Suley Mahmoud	Draw	3	5:00	(Note: For the World Middleweight Championship.)
	Andy Costello	def.	Marc Goddard	TKO (Submission to punches)	1	1:58
Light Heavyweight	Mark Epstein	def.	Glen Appleby	TKO (Corner Stoppage)	2	5:00	(Note: For the World Light Heavyweight Championship.)
	Henrique Santana	def.	Jeremy Bailey	No Contest	1	0:00
	Kuljit Degun	def.	Del Edwards	Submission (Fatigue)	2	3:18
	Alex Owen	def.	Ricky Moore	TKO (Cut)	1	0:00
	Ryan Norwood	def.	Flavio Flavio	Submission (Armbar)	1	4:55
	Ryan Robinson	def.	Lance King	Submission (Triangle Choke)	2	3:00
	Chris Freeborn	def.	Alvin Delemico	Submission (Triangle Choke)	1	4:40
	Stuart Grant	def.	Phil Labar	TKO (Corner Stoppage)	2	5:00

== Cage Rage 7 ==
Cage Rage 7 was an event held on July 10, 2004, at Wembley Conference Centre in London, United Kingdom.

=== Results ===
Main Card
Weight class				Method	Round	Time	Notes
	Jorge Rivera	def.	Mark Weir	TKO (Doctor Stoppage)	1	N/A
Light Heavyweight	Michael Bisping	def.	Mark Epstein (c)	TKO (Punches and Knees)	2	1:27	(Note: For the World Light Heavyweight Championship.)
Lightweight	Jean Silva (c)	vs.	Oliver Ellis	Draw	3	5:00	(Note: For the World Lightweight Championship.)
	Matt Ewin	def.	Jess Liaudin	TKO (Doctor Stoppage)	2	3:42
	Emmanuel Fernandez	def.	Leigh Remedios	Decision (Unanimous)	3	5:00
	Robbie Olivier	def.	Samy Schiavo	Submission (Rear-Naked Choke)	1	2:34
	Jean-Francois Lenogue	def.	Damien Riccio	Decision (Unanimous)	3	5:00
Welterweight	Paul Jenkins	def.	Ronaldo Campos (c)	TKO (Punches to the Body)	2	2:54	(Note: For the British Welterweight Championship.)
	Rick Andrews	def.	Jeremy Bailey	Submission (Guillotine Choke)	1	2:54
	Paul Daley	def.	Xavier Foupa-Pokam	KO (Punch)	1	0:50
	Dave Elliot	def.	Philly San	Submission (Armbar)	1	0:30

== Cage Rage 8 ==
Cage Rage 8 was an event held on September 11, 2004, at Wembley Conference Centre in London, United Kingdom.

=== Results ===
Main Card
Weight class				Method	Round	Time	Notes
Middleweight	Anderson Silva	def.	Lee Murray	Decision (Unanimous)	3	5:00	(Note: For the World Middleweight Championship.)
	Mark Weir	def.	Johil de Oliveira	Submission (Arm-Triangle Choke)	1	1:35
	James Zikic	def.	Matthias Riccio	Submission (Rear Naked Choke)	2	2:43
	Leigh Remedios	def.	Ricky Salhan	Submission (Armbar)	1	3:31
	Ryan Robinson	def.	Kuljit Degun	TKO (Punches)	2	3:13
	Damien Riccio	def.	Matt Ewin	KO (Punch)	2	1:45
	Phil Gildea	def.	Jeremy Bailey	DQ	2	0:00
	Sol Gilbert	def.	Jean-Francois Lenogue	Submission (Armbar)	2	4:47
	Mark Epstein	def.	Silvio de Souza	Decision (Majority)	3	5:00
	James Evans-Nicolle	def.	Suley Mahmoud	TKO (Knees)	2	4:59
Featherweight	Pete Tiarks (c)	def.	Ian Butlin	Submission (Arm Triangle Choke)	3	1:45	(Note: For the British Featherweight Championship.)

== Cage Rage 9 ==
Cage Rage 9 was an event held on November 27, 2004, at Wembley Conference Centre in London, United Kingdom.

=== Results ===
Main Card
Weight class				Method	Round	Time	Notes
Heavyweight	Ian Freeman	def.	Ryan Robinson	TKO (Punches)	1	2:44	(Note: For the World Heavyweight Championship.)
	Matt Lindland	def.	Mark Weir	TKO (Doctor Stoppage)	1	5:00
Light Heavyweight	Michael Bisping (c)	def.	Mark Epstein	KO (Punch)	3	4:43	(Note: For the World Light Heavyweight Championship.)
	Renato Sobral	def.	Cyrille Diabate	Submission (Guillotine Choke)	1	3:38
Lightweight	Jean Silva (c)	def.	Samy Schiavo	Submission (Triangle Choke)	1	4:40	(Note: For the World Lightweight Championship.)
	Sol Gilbert	def.	Ridas Vaivada	KO (Punch)	1	3:42
	Robbie Olivier	def.	Dave Elliot	KO (Slam)	1	0:57
	Paul Daley	def.	Jess Liaudin	TKO (Doctor Stoppage)	1	5:00
	Alex Reid	def.	Tulio Palhares	Submission (Triangle Choke)	1	1:17
	Sami Berik	def.	Abdul Mohamed	TKO (Cut)	1	2:41
	Mostapha Al-Turk	def.	Fereidoun Naghizadeh	TKO (Punches)	1	2:25
	Brad Pickett	def.	Stuart Grant	TKO (Punches)	1	0:17

== See also ==
- Cage Rage Championships
- List of Cage Rage champions
- List of Cage Rage events
