= 2003 in Cage Rage Championships =

Information
- First date: February 22, 2003
- Last date: October 12, 2003

Events
- Total events: 3

Fights
- Total fights: 40
- Title fights: 6

Chronology
2002 in Cage Rage	2003 in Cage Rage Championships	2004 in Cage Rage

The year 2003 was the 2nd year in the history of the Cage Rage Championships, a mixed martial arts promotion based in the United Kingdom. In 2003 Cage Rage Championships held 3 events, Cage Rage 2.

== Title fights ==
Title fights in 2003
Weight class				Method	Round	Time	Event	Notes
Lightweight	Gerald Strebendt	def.	Jean Silva	Submission (Rear Naked Choke)	1	0:00	Cage Rage 2	(Note: For the World Lightweight Championship.)
Middleweight	Paul Jenkins	def.	Gaz Roriston	Decision (Unanimous)	3	5:00	Cage Rage 2	(Note: For the World Middleweight Championship.)
Welterweight	Andy Cooper	def.	Shain Tovell	TKO (Punches)	1	0:00	Cage Rage 2	(Note: For the British Welterweight Championship.)
Welterweight	Ronaldo Campos	def.	Andy Cooper (c)	Submission (Guillotine Choke)	1	0:00	Cage Rage 3	(Note: For the British Welterweight Championship.)
Featherweight	Pete Tiarks	def.	Ricky Moore	TKO (Corner Stoppage)	1	5:00	Cage Rage 4	(Note: For the British Featherweight Championship.)
Middleweight	Paul Jenkins (c)	def.	Ian Pyatt	KO (Punch)	1	3:10	Cage Rage 4	(Note: For the World Middleweight Championship.)

== Events list ==
#	Event Title	Date	Arena	Location
4	Cage Rage 4	October 12, 2003	Caesar's Nightclub	Streatham, United Kingdom
3	Cage Rage 3	June 8, 2003	Caesar's Nightclub	Streatham, United Kingdom
2	Cage Rage 2	February 22, 2003	York Hall, Bethnal Green	London, United Kingdom

== Cage Rage 2 ==
Cage Rage 2 was held on February 22, 2003 at York Hall, Bethnal Green in London, United Kingdom.

=== Results ===
Main Card
Weight class				Method	Round	Time	Notes
Lightweight	Gerald Strebendt	def.	Jean Silva	Submission (Rear Naked Choke)	1	0:00	(Note: For the World Lightweight Championship.)
Middleweight	Paul Jenkins	def.	Gaz Roriston	Decision (Unanimous)	3	5:00	(Note: For the World Middleweight Championship.)
Welterweight	Andy Cooper	def.	Shain Tovell	TKO (Punches)	1	0:00	(Note: For the British Welterweight Championship.)
	Jeremy Bailey	def.	Phil Gildea	Submission (Guillotine Choke)	1	0:00
	Paul Taylor	def.	Jess Liaudin	Decision (Unanimous)	3	5:00
	Ronaldo Campos	def.	Andy Walker	Submission (Choke)	1	0:00
	Marc Walder	def.	Graham Connelly	Submission (Triangle Choke)	1	0:00
	Ryan Norwood	def.	Wayne Dart	Submission (Triangle Choke)	1	0:00
	Ryan Robinson	def.	Lance King	TKO	3	0:00
	David Lee	def.	Shane Burr	Submission (Armbar)	1	0:00
	Chris Cummins	def.	Kasan Hipkiss	Submission (Forearm Choke)	1	0:00
	Glen Appleby	def.	Stefan Johnson	Submission (Armbar)	1	0:00
	Jason O'Connor	def.	Leon Dickens	Submission (Armbar)	1	0:00
	Tom Gerald	def.	Jawad Khan	Decision (Unanimous)	2	5:00
	Philly San	def.	Vaughan Lee	TKO (Punches)	2	0:00

== Cage Rage 3 ==
Cage Rage 3 was held on June 8, 2003 at Caesar's Nightclub in Streatham, United Kingdom.

=== Results ===
Main Card
Weight class				Method	Round	Time	Notes
	Leigh Remedios	def.	Paul Mcveigh	Submission (Rear Naked Choke)	2	0:00
	Jean Silva	def.	Danny Batten	Decision (Unanimous)	3	5:00
Welterweight	Ronaldo Campos	def.	Andy Cooper (c)	Submission (Guillotine Choke)	1	0:00	(Note: For the British Welterweight Championship.)
	Paul Jenkins	def.	Gaz Roriston	Submission (Guillotine Choke)	2	0:00
	Ross Pettifer	def.	Mike Fouquet	Submission (Armbar)	1	0:00
	Jeremy Bailey	def.	Graham Connelly	TKO (Leg Kick)	2	0:00
	Glen Appleby	def.	Will Elworthy	TKO (Submission to elbows)	1	0:00
	Chris Hipkiss	def.	Shane Burr	Submission (Armbar)	2	0:00
	Lance King	def.	John Mitchel	TKO (Corner Stoppage)	3	0:00
	Dave Elliot	def.	David Lee	Submission (Triangle Choke)	1	0:00
	Lee Shearwood	def.	Alvin Delemico	Submission (Guillotine Choke)	1	0:00
	Wayne Dart	def.	Ryan Norwood	Submission (Rear Naked Choke)	1	0:00

== Cage Rage 4 ==
Cage Rage 4 was held on October 12, 2003 at Caesar's Nightclub in Streatham, United Kingdom.

=== Results ===
Main Card
Weight class				Method	Round	Time	Notes
	Mark Weir	def.	Jean-Francois Lenogue	Submission (Rear Naked Choke)	1	4:13
	Jean Silva	def.	Andy Cooper	Submission (Arm-Triangle Choke)	2	3:46
Featherweight	Pete Tiarks	def.	Ricky Moore	TKO (Corner Stoppage)	1	5:00	(Note: For the British Featherweight Championship.)
	Will Elworthy	def.	Jeremy Bailey	Submission (Armbar)	1	1:14
Middleweight	Paul Jenkins (c)	def.	Ian Pyatt	KO (Punch)	1	3:10	(Note: For the World Middleweight Championship.)
	Dave Elliot	def.	Paul Sutherland	Submission (Triangle Choke)	1	4:36
	Ross Pettifer	def.	Rob Evans	TKO (Injury)	1	0:04
	Lance King	def.	Jonny Mitchell	TKO (Submission to punches)	2	0:58
	Rick Andrews	def.	Phil Gildea	TKO	1	3:13
	Kasan Hipkiss	def.	Henrique Santana	Decision (Majority)	3	5:00
	Mark Smith	def.	Leon Dickens	Submission (Armbar)	1	3:15
	Chin Weakasingh	def.	John Waite	Submission (Armbar)	1	2:11
	Chris Hipkiss	def.	Wayne Dart	Submission (Armbar)	1	2:07

== See also ==
- Cage Rage Championships
- List of Cage Rage champions
- List of Cage Rage events
