= 2006 in Cage Rage Championships =

Information
- First date: February 4, 2006
- Last date: December 9, 2006

Events
- Total events: 8

Fights
- Total fights: 95
- Title fights: 16

Chronology
2005 in Cage Rage	2006 in Cage Rage Championships	2007 in Cage Rage

The year 2006 was the 5th year in the history of the Cage Rage Championships, a mixed martial arts promotion based in the United Kingdom. In 2006 Cage Rage Championships held 8 events, Cage Rage 15.

== Title fights ==
Title fights in 2006
Weight class				Method	Round	Time	Event	Notes
Light Heavyweight	Melvin Manhoef (c)	def.	Evangelista Santos	KO (Punches)	2	3:51	Cage Rage 15	(Note: For the World Light Heavyweight Championship.)
Welterweight	Chris Lytle (c)	def.	Ross Mason	Submission (Rear-Naked Choke)	2	4:57	Cage Rage 15	(Note: For the World Welterweight Championship.)
Featherweight	Brad Pickett (c)	def.	Robbie Olivier	Decision (Majority)	3	5:00	Cage Rage 15	(Note: For the British Featherweight Championship.)
Heavyweight	Tengiz Tedoradze	def.	Robert Berry	TKO (Punches)	1	1:53	Cage Rage 15	(Note: For the British Heavyweight Championship.)
Middleweight	Anderson Silva (c)	def.	Tony Fryklund	KO (Elbow)	1	2:02	Cage Rage 16	(Note: For the World Middleweight Championship.)
Light Heavyweight	Mark Epstein	def.	Ryan Robinson	Decision (Majority)	3	5:00	Cage Rage 16	(Note: For the British Light Heavyweight Championship.)
Light Heavyweight	Melvin Manhoef (c)	def.	Ian Freeman	KO (Punches)	1	0:17	Cage Rage 17	(Note: For the World Light Heavyweight Championship.)
Heavyweight	Rob Broughton	def.	James Thompson	TKO (Punches)	3	0:00	Cage Rage 17	(Note: For the British Heavyweight Championship.)
Welterweight	Paul Daley	def.	Ross Mason	Decision (Majority)	3	5:00	Cage Rage 17	(Note: For the British Welterweight Championship.)
Light Heavyweight	Ian Freeman	def.	Mark Epstein	Decision (Unanimous)	3	5:00	Cage Rage 18	(Note: For the British Light Heavyweight Championship.)
Heavyweight	Rob Broughton (c)	def.	Robert Berry	TKO (Punches)	1	3:33	Cage Rage 18	(Note: For the British Heavyweight Championship.)
Lightweight	Vítor Ribeiro (c)	def.	Abdul Mohamed	Submission (Kimura)	1	4:27	Cage Rage 18	(Note: For the World Lightweight Championship.)
Welterweight	Paul Daley (c)	def.	Sol Gilbert	KO (Punches)	2	2:59	Cage Rage 18	(Note: For the British Welterweight Championship.)
Featherweight	Robbie Olivier	def.	Brad Pickett	Submission (Rear-Naked Choke)	3	3:03	Cage Rage 18	(Note: For the British Featherweight Championship.)
Middleweight	Zelg Galesic	def.	Mark Weir	KO (Punches)	1	0:50	Cage Rage 19	(Note: For the British Middleweight Championship.)
Lightweight	Vítor Ribeiro (c)	def.	Daisuke Nakamura	Technical Submission (Straight Armbar)	1	3:55	Cage Rage 19	(Note: For the World Lightweight Championship.)

== Events list ==
#	Event Title	Date	Arena	Location
22	Cage Rage 19	December 9, 2006	Earls Court Exhibition Centre	London, United Kingdom
21	Cage Rage Contenders 3	November 12, 2006	Hammersmith Palais	London, United Kingdom
20	Cage Rage 18	September 30, 2006	Wembley Arena	London, United Kingdom
19	Cage Rage Contenders 2	August 20, 2006	Caesar's Nightclub	Streatham, United Kingdom
18	Cage Rage 17	July 1, 2006	Wembley Arena	London, United Kingdom
17	Cage Rage Contenders	May 28, 2006	Caesar's Nightclub	Streatham, United Kingdom
16	Cage Rage 16	April 22, 2006	Wembley Conference Centre	London, United Kingdom
15	Cage Rage 15	February 4, 2006	Wembley Conference Centre	London, United Kingdom

== Cage Rage 15 ==
Cage Rage 15 was an event held on February 4, 2006 at The Wembley Conference Centre in London, United Kingdom.

=== Results ===
Main Card
Weight class				Method	Round	Time	Notes
Light Heavyweight	Melvin Manhoef (c)	def.	Evangelista Santos	KO (Punches)	2	3:51	(Note: For the World Light Heavyweight Championship.)
	Daijiro Matsui	def.	Curtis Stout	Decision (Majority)	3	5:00
	Ikuhisa Minowa	def.	Dave Legeno	Submission (Achilles Lock)	1	2:21
	Travis Lutter	def.	Jose Landi-Jons	Submission (Armbar)	1	4:00
	Fabio Piamonte	def.	Jason DeLucia	Submission (Triangle Armbar)	1	1:04
	Jean Silva	def.	Paul Daley	TKO (Dislocated Thumb)	2	4:40
Welterweight	Chris Lytle (c)	def.	Ross Mason	Submission (Rear-Naked Choke)	2	4:57	(Note: For the World Welterweight Championship.)
Featherweight	Brad Pickett (c)	def.	Robbie Olivier	Decision (Majority)	3	5:00	(Note: For the British Featherweight Championship.)
Heavyweight	Tengiz Tedoradze	def.	Robert Berry	TKO (Punches)	1	1:53	(Note: For the British Heavyweight Championship.)
	Mark Epstein	def.	Darren Little	TKO (Punches)	1	1:26
	Sol Gilbert	def.	Sami Berik	KO (Punch)	2	1:05
	Ryan Robinson	def.	Brian Adams	Submission (Armbar)	1	1:05
	Zelg Galesic	def.	Michael Holmes	TKO (Punches)	1	1:41
	Jason Barrett	def.	Mindaugas Arbocius	TKO (Punches)	1	1:15

== Cage Rage 16 ==
Cage Rage 16 was an event held on April 22, 2006 at The Wembley Conference Centre in London, United Kingdom.

=== Results ===
Main Card
Weight class				Method	Round	Time	Notes
Middleweight	Anderson Silva (c)	def.	Tony Fryklund	KO (Elbow)	1	2:02	(Note: For the World Middleweight Championship.)
	Dave Menne	def.	Alex Reid	Decision (Unanimous)	3	5:00
	Paul Daley	def.	Dave Strasser	Decision (Unanimous)	3	5:00
	Amar Suloev	def.	James Evans-Nicolle	TKO (Doctor Stoppage)	1	5:00
	Jorge Patino	def.	Curtis Stout	Decision (Unanimous)	3	5:00
	Brad Pickett	def.	Hiroyuki Abe	Decision (Unanimous)	3	5:00
	Robert Berry	def.	Gary Rawlings	Submission (Kimura)	1	0:47
Light Heavyweight	Mark Epstein	def.	Ryan Robinson	Decision (Majority)	3	5:00	(Note: For the British Light Heavyweight Championship.)
	Jeremy Bailey	def.	Jason Barrett	DQ	1	0:00
	Edson Claas Vieira	def.	Tengiz Tedoradze	KO (Punch)	1	0:05
	Daisuke Nakamura	def.	Michael Johnson	Submission (Kimura)	1	1:54
	Mostapha Al-Turk	def.	Martin Thompson	TKO (Punches)	1	3:02
	Mark Buchanan	def.	Fereidoun Naghizadeh	TKO (Cut)	2	2:04

== Cage Rage Contenders ==
Cage Rage Contenders was an event held on May 28, 2006 at Caesar's Nightclub in Streatham, United Kingdom.

=== Results ===
Main Card
Weight class				Method	Round	Time	Notes
	David Lee	def.	Denis Kelly	Submission (Triangle Choke)	1	1:27
	Atilla Kubilay	def.	Brad Conway	TKO (Punches)	1	4:27
	Ronnie Mann	vs.	Ashleigh Grimshaw	Draw (Majority)	3	5:00
	Chris Freeborn	def.	Rick Andrews	Submission (Rear-Naked Choke)	2	4:16
	Marius Zaromskis	def.	Afnan Saeed	TKO (Punches)	1	1:21
	Ed Smith	def.	Dorlan O'Malley	Decision (Unanimous)	3	5:00
	Paolo Milano	def.	Sami Berik	Submission (Rear-Naked Choke)	1	4:00
	Jake Bostwick	def.	Tory Groman	KO (Punch)	1	0:09
	Danny Mann	def.	Matt Sellars	TKO (Punches)	1	2:20
	Jordan Miller	def.	Mark Smith	Submission (Triangle Choke)	1	1:41
	Vaughan Lee	def.	Stuart Grant	TKO (Punches)	1	1:46

== Cage Rage 17 ==
Cage Rage 17 was an event held on July 1, 2006 at Wembley Arena in London, United Kingdom.

=== Results ===
Main Card
Weight class				Method	Round	Time	Notes
Light Heavyweight	Melvin Manhoef (c)	def.	Ian Freeman	KO (Punches)	1	0:17	(Note: For the World Light Heavyweight Championship.)
Heavyweight	Rob Broughton	def.	James Thompson	TKO (Punches)	3	0:00	(Note: For the British Heavyweight Championship.)
	Gilbert Yvel	def.	Fabiano Scherner	TKO (Punches)	1	1:30
	Zelg Galesic	def.	Curtis Stout	Submission (Armbar)	1	1:10
	Robert Berry	def.	Henry Miller	TKO (Punches)	1	1:06
	Mark Epstein	def.	Dave Legeno	KO (Punches)	1	0:45
	Pierre Guillet	def.	Daijiro Matsui	TKO (Cut)	2	4:08
	Abdul Mohamed	def.	Jean Silva	Decision (Majority)	3	5:00
Welterweight	Paul Daley	def.	Ross Mason	Decision (Majority)	3	5:00	(Note: For the British Welterweight Championship.)
	Phil Norman	def.	David Bielkheden	Decision (Unanimous)	3	5:00
	Robbie Olivier	def.	Mark Chen	Submission (Rear Naked Choke)	1	3:11
	Dean Bray	def.	Darren Guisha	Submission (Rear Naked Choke)	1	3:03

== Cage Rage Contenders 2 ==
Cage Rage Contenders 2 was an event held on August 20, 2006 at Caesar's Nightclub in Streatham, United Kingdom.

=== Results ===
Main Card
Weight class				Method	Round	Time	Notes
	Jess Liaudin	def.	Lee Doski	TKO (Corner Stoppage)	2	5:00
	Andre Winner	def.	Jeff Lawson	Submission (Eye Injury)	2	1:26
	Che Mills	def.	Marius Zaromskis	KO (Knee)	1	4:49
	Jason Barrett	def.	Nigel Whitear	TKO (Punches)	2	2:29
	Afnan Saeed	def.	Wesley Murch	Submission (Armbar)	1	3:00
	Sami Berik	def.	Steven Elliott	Submission (Triangle Choke)	1	1:38
	Jake Bostwick	def.	Nick Porter	TKO (Punches)	1	0:19
	Jason Young	def.	Paul Phipps	TKO (Submission to punches)	1	0:26
	Luke Smith	def.	John Gisby	TKO (Punches)	1	1:11
	Marvin Arnold Bleau	def.	Terry Bostwick	TKO (Punches)	1	4:03

== Cage Rage 18 ==
Cage Rage 18 was an event held on September 30, 2006 at Wembley Arena in London, United Kingdom.

=== Results ===
Main Card
Weight class				Method	Round	Time	Notes
Light Heavyweight	Ian Freeman	def.	Mark Epstein	Decision (Unanimous)	3	5:00	(Note: For the British Light Heavyweight Championship.)
	Murilo Rua	def.	Mark Weir	Submission (Arm-Triangle Choke)	2	1:15
	Dave Legeno	def.	Kimo Leopoldo	Submission (Guillotine Choke)	1	3:21
Heavyweight	Rob Broughton (c)	def.	Robert Berry	TKO (Punches)	1	3:33	(Note: For the British Heavyweight Championship.)
Lightweight	Vítor Ribeiro (c)	def.	Abdul Mohamed	Submission (Kimura)	1	4:27	(Note: For the World Lightweight Championship.)
	Tony Fryklund	def.	Alex Reid	Submission (Heel Hook)	1	1:32
	Mostapha Al-Turk	def.	Henry Miller	TKO (Punches)	1	0:56
	Alexandru Lungu	def.	Mark Buchanan	Submission (Kimura)	1	1:55
Welterweight	Paul Daley (c)	def.	Sol Gilbert	KO (Punches)	2	2:59	(Note: For the British Welterweight Championship.)
Featherweight	Robbie Olivier	def.	Brad Pickett	Submission (Rear-Naked Choke)	3	3:03	(Note: For the British Featherweight Championship.)
	Xavier Foupa-Pokam	def.	Alex Cook	Submission (Armbar)	1	4:45
	Zelg Galesic	def.	James Evans-Nicolle	TKO (Stomp and Punches)	1	2:02

== Cage Rage Contenders 3 ==
Cage Rage Contenders 3 was an event held on November 12, 2006 at Hammersmith Palais in London, United Kingdom.

=== Results ===
Main Card
Weight class				Method	Round	Time	Notes
	Lee Doski	def.	Dean Bray	Submission (Rear-Naked Choke)	1	4:35
	Che Mills	vs.	Paul Taylor	No Contest	1	2:37
	Michael Johnson	def.	Andy Walker	TKO (Submission to punches)	2	2:28
	Andre Winner	def.	Sami Berik	TKO (Punches)	3	1:50
	Marius Zaromskis	def.	Dariusz Świerkosz	Submission (Triangle Choke)	2	N/A
	Ed Smith	def.	Rocci Williams	TKO (Punches)	1	1:16
	Jake Bostwick	def.	Marvin Arnold Bleau	TKO (Submission to punches)	2	1:05
	Dorlan O'Malley	def.	Danny Cornwall	TKO (Punches)	1	N/A
	Steven Elliott	def.	Jason Young	Submission (Armbar)	1	3:59
	Darren Russell	def.	Harvey Harra	Submission (Armbar)	1	N/A
	Tony Machado	def.	Dan Movahedi	Submission (Rear-Naked Choke)	1	1:56
	Sergei Ussanov	vs.	Andrew Burnett	NC (Accidental Illegal Strike)	0	N/A

== Cage Rage 19 ==
Cage Rage 19 was an event held on December 9, 2006 at Earls Court Exhibition Centre in London, United Kingdom.

=== Results ===
Main Card
Weight class				Method	Round	Time	Notes
	Rob Broughton	def.	Eric Esch	TKO (Submission to punches)	2	3:43
Middleweight	Zelg Galesic	def.	Mark Weir	KO (Punches)	1	0:50	(Note: For the British Middleweight Championship.)
	Elvis Sinosic	def.	Mark Epstein	Submission (Armbar)	1	2:37
Lightweight	Vítor Ribeiro (c)	def.	Daisuke Nakamura	Technical Submission (Straight Armbar)	1	3:55	(Note: For the World Lightweight Championship.)
	Luiz Azeredo	def.	Paul Daley	Decision (Unanimous)	3	5:00
	Danilo Cherman	def.	Jean Silva	Decision (Unanimous)	3	5:00
	Dave Legeno	def.	Alan Murdock	Submission (Rear Naked Choke)	1	4:10
	Xavier Foupa-Pokam	def.	Alex Reid	Technical Decision (Unanimous)	2	5:00
	Jess Liaudin	def.	Ross Mason	Submission (Heel Hook)	1	2:55
	Matt Ewin	def.	Alan McCauley	Submission (Rear Naked Choke)	1	1:53
	Suley Mahmoud	def.	Francesco Ligato	Submission (Rear Naked Choke)	1	0:37

== See also ==
- List of Cage Rage champions
- List of Cage Rage events
