= Mark Weir =

English mixed martial artist

- Born: 19 September 1967 (age 59); Gloucester, England
- Other names: The Wizard
- Height: 6 ft 2 in (1.88 m)
- Weight: 185 lb (84 kg; 13.2 st)
- Division: Middleweight
- Fighting out of: Gloucester, England
- Team: Range Fighting, Icon BJJ
- Rank: 3rd dan black belt in Taekwondo
- Years active: 2000–2013

Mixed martial arts record
- Total: 40
- Wins: 21
- By knockout: 11
- By submission: 9
- By decision: 1
- Losses: 18
- By knockout: 11
- By submission: 6
- By decision: 1
- Draws: 1

Other information
- Mixed martial arts record from Sherdog

Mark Weir (19 September 1967) is an English retired mixed martial artist usually fighting in the middleweight division at 185 lbs. He has fought in the UFC, the WEC, PRIDE, Cage Rage, UCMMA, Pancrase, and BodogFIGHT. He is the former Cage Rage British Middleweight Champion.

== Background ==
Weir began his martial arts training with Judo and Boxing, but later switched to Tae Kwon Do because his mother did not want him to box full-time. He gained his black belt in 1988 from Hee Il Cho, then 3 months later went on to win two World Titles and, at the age of 20, became the youngest fighter to ever win a World Championship. Proving his consistency Weir went on to win another two world titles in 1991. Weir not only went undefeated in Tae Kwon Do competitions, but also held an undefeated record in Kickboxing. After which he began training in Jiu-Jitsu. And started competing in MMA

== Mixed martial arts career ==
=== Early career ===
Weir made his professional mixed martial arts debut in 1996, however he continued to practice both the traditional art and MMA. This was until 2000 when Weir made the decision to solely concentrate on his MMA fighting career.

=== Ultimate Fighting Championship ===
Weir made his UFC debut at UFC 38 on 13 July 2002 against Eugene Jackson. This was the UFC's inaugural appearance in the United Kingdom, and Weir won via knockout due to a punch only 10 seconds into the fight.

Weir made his next appearance for the promotion at UFC 40, in 'the fight of the year' against Phillip Miller and was defeated in the second round via rear-naked choke submission. Weir then fought at UFC 42 against David Loiseau and was defeated via knockout in the first round. Loiseau continued on his winning streak to gain a title shot, against Richard Franklin.

=== Cage Rage and WEC ===
Weir then signed with Cage Rage in his home country of England and made his promotional debut at Cage Rage 4 and won via rear-naked choke submission in the first round. Weir would go 3-2 in his next five fights before making his debut in the WEC. Weir made his debut at WEC 12 and won in the first round via guillotine choke submission.

Weir returned to Cage Rage with mixed fortune, however it wasn't long until Weir was back on winning form. At Cage Rage 12, Weir defeated Sol Gilbert via TKO at the end of the second round to become the inaugural Cage Rage British Middleweight Champion. Weir went on to defend his title against Akri Shoji, winning by KOREA in 16 secs.

=== PRIDE ===
After the win over Shoji, Weir had to make a huge decision whether to return to UFC or make his name in Japan. Weir decided on Japan and made his PRIDE debut at Pride Bushido 10 on 2 April 2006 against Denis Kang who was on a 16 fight winning streak. Weir lost after he submitted due to knee strikes at the end of the first round.

=== UCMMA ===
On his return to the UK, Weir captured the UCMMA Middleweight Championship at UCMMA 11: Adrenaline Rush on 27 March 2010, defeating Jack Mason at the end of the second round via knockout. Weir then lost his first title defense at UCMMA 21: Stand Your Ground when he was knocked out by Denniston Sutherland. Weir made his most recent appearance at SFC: Supremacy Fight Challenge 9 on 17 February 2013 and won via rear-naked choke submission in the first round. This was to be Weir's final appearance in MMA before he announced his retirement in 2014.

== Kickboxing career ==
In 2010, Weir won the vacant UCMMA Kickboxing Championship by defeating Mark Epstein. Weir also won the Middleweight Championship by defeating Jack Mason via knockout. Weir then successfully defended his title at Unbelievable 16 on 23 October 2010 against Luke Sines.

Weir then lost his Middleweight Championship, being defeated via knockout by Louis King.

== Personal life ==
Weir lives in Hempsted, England, with his wife and four children.

== Championships and accomplishments ==
=== Mixed martial arts ===
- Ultimate Fighting Championship
  - UFC Encyclopedia Awards
    - Knockout of the Night (One time) vs. Eugene Jackson
- World Extreme Cagefighting
  - WEC North American Middleweight Championship (One time)
- Cage Rage
  - Cage Rage British Middleweight British Championship (One time) First
- Ultimate Challenge MMA
  - Ultimate Challenge MMA Middleweight Championship (One time)

== Mixed martial arts record ==
Professional record breakdown
40 matches	21 wins	18 losses
By knockout	11	11
By submission	9	6
By decision	1	1
Draws	1	

Res.	Record	Opponent	Method	Event	Date	Round	Time	Location	Notes
Win	21–18–1	Mickey Burns	Submission (rear-naked choke)	Supremacy Fight Challenge 9	17 February 2013	1	1:04	Gateshead, England	
Loss	20–18–1	Denniston Sutherland	KO (punches)	Ultimate Challenge MMA 21	25 June 2011	1	3:20	London, England	Lost the UCMMA Middleweight Championship
Win	20–17–1	Jack Mason	KO (knee and punches)	Ultimate Challenge MMA 11	27 March 2010	2	4:57	London, England	Won the UCMMA Middleweight Championship
Loss	19–17–1	Tor Troéng	Submission (triangle choke)	Superior Challenge 4	31 October 2009	3	2:05	Stockholm, Sweden	
Draw	19–16–1	Jean-François Lénogue	Draw	Furious FC 2	21 February 2009	3	5:00	Casablanca, Morocco	Return to Middleweight.
Loss	19–16	Mohamed Khacha	TKO (punches)	Ultimate Challenge MMA 2	7 February 2009	1	4:26	London, England	
Win	19–15	Marius Buzinskas	Submission (arm-triangle choke)	Cage FC 4	25 October 2008	2	2:04	Kent, England	
Loss	18–15	Drew Fickett	Submission (rear-naked choke)	Cage Rage 24	1 December 2007	1	3:55	London, England	
Loss	18–14	Paul Daley	TKO (punches)	Cage Rage 23	22 September 2007	2	2:14	London, England	For the vacant Cage Rage Welterweight Championship.
Loss	18–13	Nick Thompson	TKO (punches)	BodogFight: Vancouver	24 August 2007	1	4:01	Vancouver, British Columbia, Canada	
Win	18–12	Daijiro Matsui	Decision (unanimous)	Cage Rage 21	21 April 2007	3	5:00	London, England	Welterweight debut.
Loss	17–12	Zelg Galešic	KO (punches)	Cage Rage 19	9 December 2006	1	0:50	London, England	Lost the Cage Rage British Middleweight Championship.
Loss	17–11	Murilo Rua	Submission (arm-triangle choke)	Cage Rage 18	30 September 2006	2	1:15	London, England	
Loss	17–10	Denis Kang	TKO (submission to knees)	PRIDE Bushido 10	2 April 2006	1	4:55	Tokyo, Japan	
Win	17–9	Akira Shoji	KO (head kick)	Cage Rage 14	3 December 2005	1	0:17	London, England	
Win	16–9	Kyosuke Sasaki	KO (punches)	Cage Rage 13	10 September 2005	1	1:52	London, England	
Win	15–9	Sol Gilbert	TKO (corner stoppage)	Cage Rage 12	2 July 2005	2	5:00	London, England	Won the Cage Rage British Middleweight Championship.
Loss	14–9	Curtis Stout	TKO (punches)	Cage Rage 11	30 April 2005	1	1:45	London, England	
Loss	14–8	Alex Serdyukov	Submission (arm-triangle choke)	WEC 14	17 March 2005	2	2:56	Lemoore, California, United States	Lost the WEC North American Middleweight Championship.
Loss	14–7	Gabriel Santos	Decision (unanimous)	Cage Rage 10	26 February 2005	3	5:00	London, England	
Loss	14–6	Matt Lindland	TKO (doctor stoppage)	Cage Rage 9	27 November 2004	1	5:00	London, England	
Win	14–5	Will Bradford	Submission (fist choke)	WEC 12	21 October 2004	1	2:11	Lemoore, California, United States	Won the vacant WEC North American Middleweight Championship.
Win	13–5	Johil de Oliveira	Submission (arm-triangle choke)	Cage Rage 8	11 September 2004	1	1:35	London, England	
Loss	12–5	Jorge Rivera	TKO (doctor stoppage)	Cage Rage 7	10 July 2004	1	5:00	London, England	
Win	12–4	Gen Isono	TKO (corner stoppage)	Pain and Glory 2004	24 April 2004	N/A	N/A	Birmingham, England	
Win	11–4	Alex Reid	TKO (doctor stoppage)	Extreme Brawl 6	21 March 2004	2	N/A	Bracknell, England	
Loss	10–4	Gregory Bouchelaghem	Submission (rear-naked choke)	Xtreme FC 2	9 November 2003	1	N/A	Cornwall, England	
Win	10–3	Jean-François Lénogue	Submission (rear-naked choke)	Cage Rage 4	12 October 2003	1	4:13	London, England	
Loss	9–3	David Loiseau	KO (punches)	UFC 42	25 April 2003	1	3:55	Miami, Florida, United States	
Loss	9–2	Phillip Miller	Submission (rear-naked choke)	UFC 40	22 November 2002	2	4:50	Las Vegas, Nevada, United States	
Win	9–1	Eugene Jackson	KO (punch)	UFC 38	13 July 2002	1	0:10	London, England	
Win	8–1	Ben Earwood	TKO (submission to punches)	Millennium Brawl 5	16 December 2001	2	N/A	High Wycombe, England	
Win	7–1	Shannon Ritch	Submission (choke)	Millennium Brawl 3	1 July 2001	1	N/A	High Wycombe, England	
Win	6–1	Paul Jenkins	KO	Grapple & Strike 3	19 May 2001	1	0:18	Worcester, England	
Win	5–1	CJ Fernandes	TKO	Millennium Brawl 2	11 March 2001	N/A	N/A	High Wycombe, England	
Win	4–1	Sean Cocharin	TKO	Ultimate Fight Night 1	9 December 2000	1	N/A	High Wycombe, England	
Win	3–1	Frank Ledroumaguet	Submission (armbar)	Pancrase: Pancrase UK	25 November 2000	1	N/A	London, England	
Win	2–1	John Andrews	Submission (choke)	Grapple & Strike 2	12 November 2000	1	N/A	Worcester, England	
Win	1–1	Dale Houghton	Submission (forearm choke)	Ring of Truth 3	17 October 2000	1	1:16	London, England	
Loss	0–1	Trevor Cunningham	KO	Grapple & Strike 1	29 May 2000	2	4:17	Worcester, England	Middleweight debut.

== See also ==
- List of male mixed martial artists
