= Rob Broughton =

English MMA fighter

- Born: 3 March 1983 (age 43); St. Helens, England
- Other names: The Bear
- Nationality: English
- Height: 6 ft 2 in (1.88 m)
- Weight: 258 lb (117 kg; 18 st 6 lb)
- Division: Heavyweight
- Reach: 74 in (188 cm)
- Fighting out of: Liverpool, England
- Team: Wolfslair MMA Academy
- Rank: Blue Belt in Brazilian Jiu-Jitsu
- Years active: 2004–2015

Mixed martial arts record
- Total: 24
- Wins: 16
- By knockout: 8
- By submission: 5
- By decision: 3
- Losses: 7
- By knockout: 1
- By submission: 2
- By decision: 4
- Draws: 1

Other information
- Mixed martial arts record from Sherdog

Rob Broughton (born 3 March 1983) is an English former mixed martial artist who competed in the heavyweight division. A professional competitor between 2004 and 2015, Broughton is a former British Cage Rage heavyweight champion and has also competed in the Ultimate Fighting Championship (UFC), RINGS, and M-1 Global.

Broughton was sentenced to an eight-year prison term in 2021 for his role as an enforcer for a drug gang.

== Mixed martial arts career ==
=== Cage Rage ===
Rob first gained national recognition in 2006 when he became the British Cage Rage Heavyweight Champion, after defeating former PRIDE veteran James Thompson at Cage Rage 17 in Wembley Arena, on just one week's notice.

Broughton then went on to defeat Robert Berry via KO and submit the world-renowned and ex-World Super Heavyweight Boxing Champion, Eric Esch in Cage Rage competition. However Broughton's win streak was ended against Tengiz Tedoradze, when a cut eye forced a premature end to the bout.

During 2007 Rob sustained a severe injury during training, which prevented him from professional competition for over a year, but on his return to the Cage Rage Championships in March 2008, he showed his potential once again by ending the unbeaten record of Neil Grove at Cage Rage 25 by majority decision.

In October 2008, Broughton then fought the former UFC Heavyweight Champion Ricco Rodriguez in Liverpool. On this occasion Broughton impressed again by avoiding his opponent's takedown attempts, whilst dominating early on in the clinch and in top position too. However, despite a promising second round Broughton eventually succumbed to Rodriguez by kneebar, which came as a bitter blow to the Liverpool-based fighter. However this performance has only increased Broughton's determination to break through into the world scene.

=== M1 Challenge /Global ===
Broughton made his M-1 debut representing Team England on 29 April in Japan, defeating the then unbeaten Japanese fighter Yusuke Kawaguchi by decision after a dominating performance. Then on 5 June he made his second M-1 Challenge appearance defeating Soufian Elgarne via TKO. Elgarne's corner withdrew their fighter early on in the bout after Broughton controlled the fight from the start with superior clinch work and striking.

Broughton's performances in the M-1 Challenge meant he was called up to the ill-fated Affliction: Trilogy show on 1 August in Los Angeles. However, the event was cancelled, and Broughton's fight against Jessie Gibbs was hastily rearranged to the M-1 Global Presents Breakthrough show on 28 August in Kansas City. Broughton, who was hampered by bad flight plans and other logistical issues, was unable to show his true potential in a bout that was broadcast live on HDNet in the US and live over the internet and as a result he lost by decision.

Frustrated by his performance, Broughton immediately requested to fight in the M-1 Challenge semifinals in Russia and despite suffering from injuries and hampered by bad preparation, he was able to claim Team England's only win of the night as he submitted the BodogFIGHT veteran Akhmed Sultanov by keylock in round 1 of their bout. Broughton dominated proceedings and totally nullified Sultanov's offence and eventually forced the Russian to verbally submit to a shoulder lock. This win saw Broughton increase his M-1 Challenge record to 3–0 and helped him establish his status as one of Europe's top Heavyweight prospects.

=== ZT Fight Night: Heavyweights Collide ===
Broughton participated in the ZT Fight Night: Heavyweights Collide. This event was considered important in the UK domestic scene, to clarify the UK-based number one Heavyweight.

The ZT Fight Night Heavyweight Tournament was a one-night tournament that took place on 31 January 2010. In the opening round he faced off against UFC veteran Neil Wain, submitting Wain with a guillotine choke in the second round. In the semifinals he faced MMA journeyman James Thompson, who was coming off an impressive TKO (punches) win over Tengiz Tedoradze in his opening round. Broughton had defeated Thompson in the past, back in 2006 and the win had made Brougton the British Cage Rage Heavyweight Champion. The man who took the title away from Broughton was Tengiz Tedoradze, who Thompson defeated to face off against Broughton in the tournament. In this bout, Broughton defeated Thompson by KO (Punch) in the second round.

Broughton was next expected to face off against Joe Vedepo, a natural Middleweight who took part in the Heavyweight tournament on a days notice, but Vedepo broke his hand in his semifinals bout against Oli Thompson, which forced him out of the finals. Oli Thompson went on to replace Vedepo and Broughton defeated Oli Thompson in the finals by unanimous decision to win the ZT Fight Night Heavyweight Tournament Championship as well as earning the £10,000 tournament cheque.

After the event, Rob stated that he hoped the bigger organizations such as the UFC and Strikeforce noticed his achievements and hopes of landing a multi-fight contract.

=== Ultimate Fighting Championship ===
On 21 April 2010, ESPN UK reported that Broughton and two other Wolfslair MMA Academy teammates had signed with the UFC on a multi-fight contract

His debut was against Vinicius Queiroz at UFC 120 in which he won via rear-naked choke. Queiroz later tested positive for the steroid Stanozolol.

Broughton was expected face promotional newcomer Dave Herman on 11 June 2011 at UFC 131. However, in late March, Broughton was replaced in the bout by Joey Beltran.

Broughton faced Travis Browne on 24 September 2011 at UFC 135 where he lost by unanimous decision.

Broughton made a quick return to the octagon as he replaced Oli Thompson at UFC 138 against Phil De Fries. He lost the fight via unanimous decision.

Broughton was scheduled to face Ednaldo Oliveira on 14 January 2012 at UFC 142, but was forced out of the bout and replaced by Gabriel Gonzaga.

Broughton was expected to face Matt Mitrione on 4 August 2012 at UFC on Fox: Shogun vs. Vera. However, the bout was scrapped after Broughton pulled out for an undisclosed personal matter.

Broughton/Mitrione was briefly linked to UFC on FX 5. However, the bout was scrapped altogether after Broughton was forced out of the bout a second time and as a result, Broughton was released from the promotion.

== Personal life ==
Rob Broughton has a son

== Championships and accomplishments ==
- Cage Rage
  - Cage Rage British Heavyweight Champion
- ZT Fight Nights
  - ZT Fight Night Heavyweight Tournament Winner (2010)

== Mixed martial arts record ==
Professional record breakdown
24 matches	16 wins	7 losses
By knockout	8	1
By submission	5	2
By decision	3	4
Draws	1	

Res.	Record	Opponent	Method	Event	Date	Round	Time	Location	Notes
Win	16–7–1	Marcin Bocian	Submission (kimura)	ICE FC 6: Broughton vs. Bocian	12 June 2015	1	0:18	Manchester, Greater Manchester, England, United Kingdom	
Loss	15–7–1	Phil De Fries	Decision (unanimous)	UFC 138	5 November 2011	3	5:00	Birmingham, England, United Kingdom	
Loss	15–6–1	Travis Browne	Decision (unanimous)	UFC 135	24 September 2011	3	5:00	Denver, Colorado, United States	
Win	15–5–1	Vinicius Queiroz	Submission (rear-naked choke)	UFC 120	16 October 2010	3	1:43	London, England	Queiroz later tested positive for steroids.
Win	14–5–1	Oli Thompson	Decision (unanimous)	ZT Fight Night: Heavyweights Collide	30 January 2010	3	5:00	Hove, England	Won the ZT Fight Night Heavyweight tournament.
Win	13–5–1	James Thompson	KO (punch)	ZT Fight Night: Heavyweights Collide	30 January 2010	2	2:28	Hove, England	ZT Fight Night Heavyweight Tournament Semifinal Bout
Win	12–5–1	Neil Wain	Submission (guillotine choke)	ZT Fight Night: Heavyweights Collide	30 January 2010	2	1:16	Hove, England	ZT Fight Night Heavyweight Tournament Quarterfinal Bout
Win	11–5–1	Akhmed Sultanov	Submission (americana)	M-1 Challenge 19: 2009 Semifinals	26 September 2009	1	4:31	Rostov Oblast, Russia	
Loss	10–5–1	Jessie Gibbs	Decision (unanimous)	M-1 Global: Breakthrough	29 August 2009	3	5:00	Kansas City, Missouri, United States	
Win	10–4–1	Soufian Elgarne	TKO (ankle injury)	M-1 Challenge 16: USA	5 June 2009	1	2:02	Kansas City, Missouri, United States	
Win	9–4–1	Yusuke Kawaguchi	Decision (unanimous)	M-1 Challenge 14: Japan	29 April 2009	2	5:00	Tokyo, Japan	
Loss	8–4–1	Ricco Rodriguez	Submission (kneebar)	CG 9: Beatdown	4 October 2008	2	3:39	Liverpool, England	
Win	8–3–1	Neil Grove	Decision (majority)	Cage Rage 25	8 March 2008	3	5:00	London, England	
Loss	7–3–1	Tengiz Tedoradze	TKO (doctor stoppage)	Cage Rage 20	10 February 2007	2	0:58	London, England	Lost Cage Rage British Heavyweight Championship.
Win	7–2–1	Butterbean	TKO (submission to punches)	Cage Rage 19	9 December 2006	2	3:43	London, England	Non-title bout
Win	6–2–1	Robert Berry	TKO (punches)	Cage Rage 18	30 September 2006	1	3:33	London, England	Defended the Cage Rage British Heavyweight Championship.
Win	5–2–1	James Thompson	KO (punches)	Cage Rage 17	1 July 2006	3	0:49	London, England	Won the Cage Rage British Heavyweight Championship.
Win	4–2–1	Martin Thompson	Submission (guillotine choke)	War in Workington 1	17 June 2006	2	3:40	Cumbria, England	
Win	3–2–1	Sidnei da Silva	TKO	Cage Gladiators 1	22 May 2006	1	0:44	Liverpool, England	
Loss	2–2–1	Peter Cousins	Decision	Intense Fighting 2	28 January 2006	N/A	N/A	Cambridge, England	
Win	2–1–1	Andy Ryan	TKO (punches)	RINGS: Bushido Ireland	12 March 2005	1	N/A	Ireland	
Win	1–1–1	Ryan Robinson	KO	CFC 3: Cage Carnage	6 March 2005	1	N/A	Liverpool, England	
Draw	0–1–1	Assim Assine	Draw	CFC 2: Cage Carnage	14 November 2004	2	N/A	Liverpool, England	
Loss	0–1	Milco Voorn	Submission (choke)	CFC 1: Cage Carnage	11 July 2004	N/A	N/A	Liverpool, England	
