= 2005 in Cage Rage Championships =

Information
- First date: February 26, 2005
- Last date: April 30, 2005

Events
- Total events: 5

Fights
- Total fights: 65
- Title fights: 10

Chronology
2004 in Cage Rage	2005 in Cage Rage Championships	2006 in Cage Rage

The year 2005 was the 4th year in the history of the Cage Rage Championships, a mixed martial arts promotion based in the United Kingdom. In 2005 Cage Rage Championships held 5 events, Cage Rage 10.

== Title fights ==
Title fights in 2005
Weight class				Method	Round	Time	Event	Notes
Lightweight	Jean Silva (c)	vs.	Leigh Remedios	Draw	3	5:00	Cage Rage 10	(Note: For the World Lightweight Championship.)
Middleweight	Anderson Silva (c)	def.	Jorge Rivera	TKO (Knees and Punches)	2	3:53	Cage Rage 11	(Note: For the World Middleweight Championship.)
Welterweight	Paul Daley	vs.	Paul Jenkins (c)	Draw	3	5:00	Cage Rage 11	(Note: For the British Welterweight Championship.)
Middleweight	Mark Weir	def.	Sol Gilbert	TKO (Corner Stoppage)	2	5:00	Cage Rage 12	(Note: For the British Middleweight Championship.)
Heavyweight	Antonio Silva	def.	Rafael Carino	TKO (Corner Stoppage)	1	2:55	Cage Rage 12	(Note: For the World Heavyweight Championship.)
Lightweight	Vítor Ribeiro	def.	Jean Silva (c)	Submission (Arm-Triangle Choke)	2	4:18	Cage Rage 13	(Note: For the World Lightweight Championship.)
Light Heavyweight	Melvin Manhoef	def.	Fabio Piamonte	KO (Punches)	1	0:51	Cage Rage 13	(Note: For the World Light Heavyweight Championship.)
Featherweight	Brad Pickett	def.	Ozzy Haluk	TKO (Stomp)	2	4:25	Cage Rage 13	(Note: For the British Featherweight Championship.)
Lightweight	Abdul Mohamed	def.	Alexandre Izidro	Decision (Unanimous)	3	5:00	Cage Rage 13	(Note: For the British Lightweight Championship.)
Middleweight	Anderson Silva (c)	def.	Curtis Stout	KO (Punches)	1	4:59	Cage Rage 14	(Note: For the World Middleweight Championship.)

== Events list ==
#	Event Title	Date	Arena	Location
14	Cage Rage 14	December 3, 2005	Wembley Conference Centre	London, United Kingdom
13	Cage Rage 13	September 10, 2005	Wembley Conference Centre	London, United Kingdom
12	Cage Rage 12	July 2, 2005	Wembley Conference Centre	London, United Kingdom
11	Cage Rage 11	April 30, 2005	Wembley Conference Centre	London, United Kingdom
10	Cage Rage 10	February 26, 2005	Wembley Conference Centre	London, United Kingdom

== Cage Rage 10 ==
Cage Rage 10 was an event held on February 26, 2005 at The Wembley Conference Centre in London, United Kingdom.

=== Results ===
Main Card
Weight class				Method	Round	Time	Notes
	Renato Sobral	def.	Pierre Guillet	TKO (Submission to punches)	1	1:57
	Curtis Stout	def.	Sol Gilbert	KO (Punch)	2	0:20
	Gabriel Santos	def.	Mark Weir	Decision (Unanimous)	3	5:00
	Jorge Rivera	def.	Alex Reid	KO (Punches)	1	0:41
	Melvin Manhoef	def.	Matthias Riccio	TKO (Punches)	1	3:01
Lightweight	Jean Silva (c)	vs.	Leigh Remedios	Draw	3	5:00	(Note: For the World Lightweight Championship.)
	Sami Berik	def.	Jeremy Bailey	Decision (Split)	3	5:00
	Antony Rea	def.	Evangelista Santos	TKO (Punches)	2	1:55
	Dan Burzotta	def.	Andy Costello	Submission (Armbar)	1	2:38
	Robert Berry	def.	Andy Harby	KO (Punches)	1	2:51
	Chris Freeborn	def.	Brad Pickett	TKO (Punches)	2	3:20
	David Lee	def.	Rick Andrews	Submission (Triangle Choke)	1	0:43
	Andy Walker	def.	Alex de Souza	Decision (Unanimous)	3	5:00

== Cage Rage 11 ==
Cage Rage 11 was an event held on April 30, 2005 at The Wembley Conference Centre in London, United Kingdom.

=== Results ===
Main Card
Weight class				Method	Round	Time	Notes
Middleweight	Anderson Silva (c)	def.	Jorge Rivera	TKO (Knees and Punches)	2	3:53	(Note: For the World Middleweight Championship.)
	Curtis Stout	def.	Mark Weir	TKO (Punches)	1	1:45
	Evangelista Santos	def.	Mark Epstein	TKO (Punches)	1	2:16
	Antony Rea	def.	Pierre Guillet	TKO (Knees and Punches)	2	0:45
	Ross Mason	def.	Damien Riccio	TKO (Cut)	3	4:37
Welterweight	Paul Daley	vs.	Paul Jenkins (c)	Draw	3	5:00	(Note: For the British Welterweight Championship.)
	Hassan Muridi	def.	Henrique Santana	TKO (Corner Stoppage)	2	5:00
	Brad Pickett	def.	Aaron Blackwell	TKO (Corner Stoppage)	2	5:00
	Robert Berry	def.	Andy Costello	KO (Punch)	1	1:22
	Abdul Mohamed	def.	Jess Liaudin	TKO (Doctor Stoppage)	1	5:00
	Tom Blackledge	def.	Kuljit Degun	Submission (Neck Crank)	1	1:01
	Richard Bowkett	def.	Atilla Kubilay	Disqualification	1	N/A

== Cage Rage 12 ==
Cage Rage 12 was an event held on July 2, 2005 at The Wembley Conference Centre in London, United Kingdom.

=== Results ===
Main Card
Weight class				Method	Round	Time	Notes
Middleweight	Mark Weir	def.	Sol Gilbert	TKO (Corner Stoppage)	2	5:00	(Note: For the British Middleweight Championship.)
Heavyweight	Antonio Silva	def.	Rafael Carino	TKO (Corner Stoppage)	1	2:55	(Note: For the World Heavyweight Championship.)
	Alex Reid	def.	Kyosuke Sasaki	TKO (Doctor Stoppage)	1	5:00
	Vítor Ribeiro	def.	Gerald Strebendt	Submission (Guillotine Choke)	1	1:13
	Curtis Stout	def.	Nilson de Castro	TKO (Punches)	1	0:15
	Travis Lutter	def.	Matt Ewin	Submission (Keylock)	1	1:40
	Mark Epstein	def.	Matthias Riccio	TKO (Punches)	1	4:58
	Brad Pickett	def.	Jordan Miller	Submission (Armbar)	2	2:32
	Phil Norman	def.	Hassan Muridi	Decision (Unanimous)	3	5:00
	Fabio Piamonte	def.	Cyrille Diabate	Submission (Arm-Triangle Choke)	1	2:09
	Tom Blackledge	def.	Alan Murdock	Submission (Armbar)	1	2:56
	Tony Thompson	def.	Rick Andrews	Submission (Armbar)	1	1:53
	David Lee	def.	Jason Barrett	Submission (Rear-Naked Choke)	1	4:28

== Cage Rage 13 ==
Cage Rage 13 was an event held on September 10, 2005 at The Wembley Conference Centre in London, United Kingdom.

=== Results ===
Main Card
Weight class				Method	Round	Time	Notes
Lightweight	Vítor Ribeiro	def.	Jean Silva (c)	Submission (Arm-Triangle Choke)	2	4:18	(Note: For the World Lightweight Championship.)
	James Thompson	def.	Andy Costello	TKO (Punches)	1	2:33
Light Heavyweight	Melvin Manhoef	def.	Fabio Piamonte	KO (Punches)	1	0:51	(Note: For the World Light Heavyweight Championship.)
	Mark Weir	def.	Kyosuke Sasaki	KO (Punches)	1	1:52
	Jorge Rivera	def.	Marcelo Azevedo	Decision (Unanimous)	3	5:00
	Evangelista Santos	def.	Darren Little	TKO (Corner Stoppage)	1	0:55
	Antony Rea	def.	Remus Ciobnu	Submission (Rear-Naked Choke)	1	4:40
Featherweight	Brad Pickett	def.	Ozzy Haluk	TKO (Stomp)	2	4:25	(Note: For the British Featherweight Championship.)
	Dean Bray	def.	Jeremy Bailey	TKO (Cut)	1	4:31
Lightweight	Abdul Mohamed	def.	Alexandre Izidro	Decision (Unanimous)	3	5:00	(Note: For the British Lightweight Championship.)
	James Evans-Nicolle	def.	Tulio Palhares	TKO (Punches)	2	1:37
	Mark Buchanan	def.	Kuljit Degun	TKO (Submission to punches)	1	1:38

== Cage Rage 14 ==
Cage Rage 14 was an event held on December 3, 2005 at The Wembley Conference Centre in London, United Kingdom.

=== Results ===
Main Card
Weight class				Method	Round	Time	Notes
Middleweight	Anderson Silva (c)	def.	Curtis Stout	KO (Punches)	1	4:59	(Note: For the World Middleweight Championship.)
	Vitor Belfort	def.	Antony Rea	KO (Punches)	2	1:30
	Mark Weir	def.	Akira Shoji	KO (Head Kick)	1	0:17
	Daijiro Matsui	vs.	Alex Reid	Draw (Majority)	3	5:00
	Matt Lindland	def.	Antonio Schembri	TKO (Punches)	3	3:33
	Mark Epstein	def.	Brian Adams	KO (Punch)	1	0:19
	Robert Berry	def.	Marc Goddard	Submission (Guillotine Choke)	1	1:01
	Sol Gilbert	def.	Xavier Foupa-Pokam	DQ	1	1:10
	Alan Murdock	def.	Dave Legeno	Submission (Armbar)	1	4:07
	Robbie Olivier	def.	Chris Freeborn	Decision (Unanimous)	3	5:00
	Nigel Whitear	def.	Dean Bray	Submission (Armbar)	1	3:56
	Ross Mason	def.	Darren Guisha	TKO (Punches)	2	2:16
	Gesias Cavalcante	def.	Michihiro Omigawa	KO (Punches)	1	0:49
	Paul Daley	def.	Joey van Wanrooij	Decision (Unanimous)	3	5:00
	Ryan White	def.	Mark Buchanan	TKO (Punches)	1	3:07

== See also ==
- Cage Rage Championships
- List of Cage Rage champions
- List of Cage Rage events
