= List of Cage Rage events =

This is a list of events held by the Cage Rage Championships, a now-defunct mixed martial arts organization that was based in England. The first event, Cage Rage 1, took place on September 7, 2002 and the last, Cage Rage UK - Fighting Hurts Final, on November 1, 2008.

| # | Event Title | Date | Arena | Location |
|---|---|---|---|---|
| 43 | Cage Rage UK - Fighting Hurts Final | November 1, 2008 | The Troxy | London, United Kingdom |
| 42 | Cage Rage 28 | September 20, 2008 | The Troxy | London, United Kingdom |
| 41 | Cage Rage 27 | July 12, 2008 | Wembley Arena | London, United Kingdom |
| 40 | Cage Rage Contenders 10 | June 14, 2008 | The Troxy | London, United Kingdom |
| 39 | Cage Rage 26 | May 10, 2008 | NEC Arena | Birmingham, United Kingdom |
| 38 | Cage Rage Contenders - Ireland vs. Belgium | May 3, 2008 | National Stadium | Dublin, Ireland |
| 37 | Cage Rage Contenders 9 | April 12, 2008 | The Troxy | London, United Kingdom |
| 36 | Cage Rage 25 | March 8, 2008 | Wembley Arena | London, United Kingdom |
| 35 | Cage Rage Contenders 8 | February 2, 2008 | The Troxy | London, United Kingdom |
| 34 | Cage Rage 24 | December 1, 2007 | Wembley Arena | London, United Kingdom |
| 33 | Cage Rage Contenders: Wales | November 18, 2007 | Brangwyn Hall | Swansea, United Kingdom |
| 32 | Cage Rage Contenders 7 | November 10, 2007 | The Troxy | London, United Kingdom |
| 31 | Cage Rage Contenders: Dynamite | September 29, 2007 | National Stadium | Dublin, Ireland |
| 30 | Cage Rage 23 | September 22, 2007 | Wembley Arena | London, United Kingdom |
| 29 | Cage Rage Contenders 6 | August 18, 2007 | | London, United Kingdom |
| 28 | Cage Rage 22 | July 14, 2007 | Wembley Arena | London, United Kingdom |
| 27 | Cage Rage Contenders 5 | June 16, 2007 | Wembley Arena | London, United Kingdom |
| 26 | Cage Rage Contenders: The Real Deal | May 26, 2007 | The Point | Dublin, Ireland |
| 25 | Cage Rage 21 | April 21, 2007 | Wembley Arena | London, United Kingdom |
| 24 | Cage Rage Contenders 4 | March 4, 2007 | Hammersmith Palais | London, United Kingdom |
| 23 | Cage Rage 20 | February 10, 2007 | Wembley Arena | London, United Kingdom |
| 22 | Cage Rage 19 | December 9, 2006 | Earls Court Exhibition Centre | London, United Kingdom |
| 21 | Cage Rage Contenders 3 | November 12, 2006 | Hammersmith Palais | London, United Kingdom |
| 20 | Cage Rage 18 | September 30, 2006 | Wembley Arena | London, United Kingdom |
| 19 | Cage Rage Contenders 2 | August 20, 2006 | Caesar's Nightclub | Streatham, United Kingdom |
| 18 | Cage Rage 17 | July 1, 2006 | Wembley Arena | London, United Kingdom |
| 17 | Cage Rage Contenders | May 28, 2006 | Caesar's Nightclub | Streatham, United Kingdom |
| 16 | Cage Rage 16 | April 22, 2006 | Wembley Conference Centre | London, United Kingdom |
| 15 | Cage Rage 15 | February 4, 2006 | Wembley Conference Centre | London, United Kingdom |
| 14 | Cage Rage 14 | December 3, 2005 | Wembley Conference Centre | London, United Kingdom |
| 13 | Cage Rage 13 | September 10, 2005 | Wembley Conference Centre | London, United Kingdom |
| 12 | Cage Rage 12 | July 2, 2005 | Wembley Conference Centre | London, United Kingdom |
| 11 | Cage Rage 11 | April 30, 2005 | Wembley Conference Centre | London, United Kingdom |
| 10 | Cage Rage 10 | February 26, 2005 | Wembley Conference Centre | London, United Kingdom |
| 9 | Cage Rage 9 | November 27, 2004 | Wembley Conference Centre | London, United Kingdom |
| 8 | Cage Rage 8 | September 11, 2004 | Wembley Conference Centre | London, United Kingdom |
| 7 | Cage Rage 7 | July 10, 2004 | Wembley Conference Centre | London, United Kingdom |
| 6 | Cage Rage 6 | May 23, 2004 | Caesar's Nightclub | Streatham, United Kingdom |
| 5 | Cage Rage 5 | February 15, 2004 | Caesar's Nightclub | Streatham, United Kingdom |
| 4 | Cage Rage 4 | October 12, 2003 | Caesar's Nightclub | Streatham, United Kingdom |
| 3 | Cage Rage 3 | June 8, 2003 | Caesar's Nightclub | Streatham, United Kingdom |
| 2 | Cage Rage 2 | February 22, 2003 | York Hall, Bethnal Green | London, United Kingdom |
| 1 | Cage Rage 1 | September 7, 2002 | The Fusion Leisure Centre, Elephant & Castle | London, United Kingdom |
