= Jimi Manuwa =

English mixed martial arts fighter

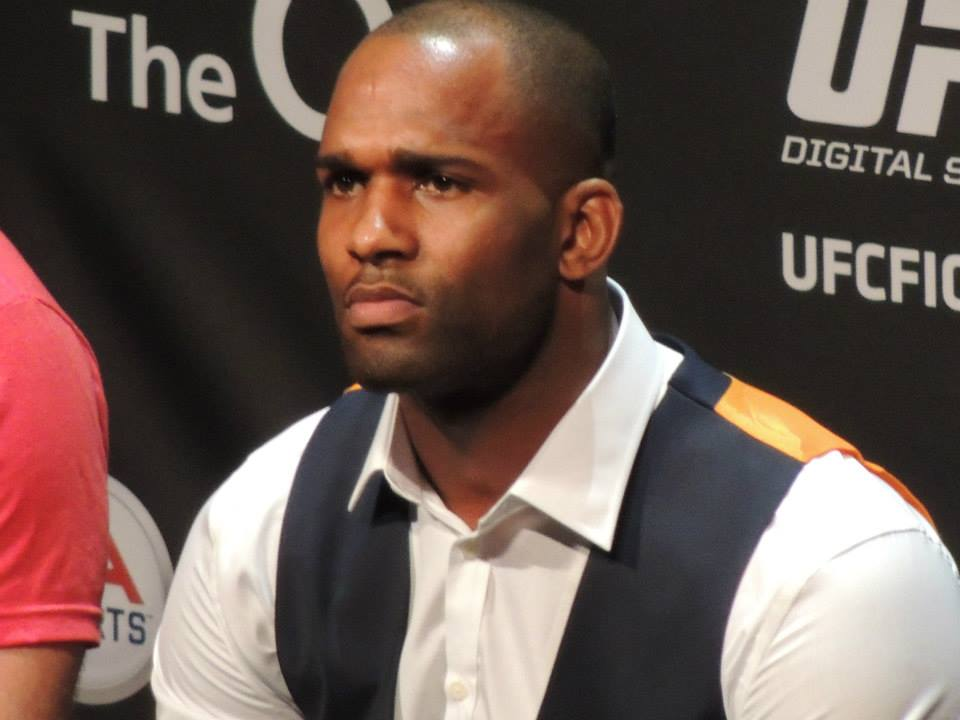
- Manuwa in 2014
- Born: Babajimi Abiola Manuwa; 18 February 1980 (age 46); Sacramento, California, United States
- Other names: Poster Boy
- Nationality: British
- Height: 6 ft 0 in (1.83 m)
- Weight: 205 lb (93 kg; 14.6 st)
- Division: Light heavyweight
- Reach: 79 1/2 in (202 cm)
- Fighting out of: London, England, United Kingdom
- Team: Allstars Training Center; Lions Pride MMA; Keddles Gym; Nova Força UK
- Rank: Purple belt in Brazilian Jiu-Jitsu under Ricardo da Silva
- Years active: 2008–2019 (MMA)

Mixed martial arts record
- Total: 23
- Wins: 17
- By knockout: 15
- By submission: 1
- By decision: 1
- Losses: 6
- By knockout: 5
- By decision: 1

Other information
- Mixed martial arts record from Sherdog

Babajimi Abiola "Jimi" Manuwa (born 18 February 1980) is an American-born English retired mixed martial artist who competed in the light heavyweight division of the Ultimate Fighting Championship.

== Early life ==
Babajimi was born in California and lived there until three when his father moved the family back to Nigeria. His family has links to the Nigerian chieftaincy system; his grandfather was the medical pioneer Sir Samuel Manuwa, who was a chief, and his great-great-grandfather was Oba Kuheyin, a king of Itebu-Manuwa.

Manuwa moved to London, England, at ten. He got in trouble as a teen and did not finish school. After being convicted of conspiracy to burgle, he was sent to prison in 2002 and got out in 2003.

== Mixed martial arts career ==
Manuwa began training in mixed martial arts in 2007, following a weight lifting injury where he ruptured a chest muscle. He currently trains at Keddles Gym with Alan Keddle and Dino Miringou and at Nova Força BJJ with Ricardo da Silva.

=== UCMMA ===
Manuwa began fighting for UCMMA name in only his third professional fight, becoming the promotion's champion in his third fight under them. He successfully defended his title 5 times, more than any other champion in the company, past or present.

During this time period, Manuwa famously turned down a contract offer from the Ultimate Fighting Championship, feeling it wasn't the right time in his career to accept it. He did state that reaching the UFC was his "ultimate goal" in the future. He was then offered to fight at the UFC 138 event, but also refused that one, citing that he hadn't competed since summer of 2010, and that "If he fought on the October card that would have been after a fifteen-month layoff, which is not ideal under any circumstances. You do need to be fighting regularly to stay sharp..."

He successfully defended his title for the fifth time at UCMMA 24: Hands of War, against Nick Chapman.

=== BAMMA ===
After defending his title a record 5th time, Manuwa signed a four fight, exclusive contract with BAMMA. He made his debut at BAMMA 8. He faced Frenchman Antony Rea and won the fight via TKO.

=== Ultimate Fighting Championship ===
Having turned down a UFC contract a few years previously, Manuwa signed with the promotion in July 2012.

Manuwa made his UFC debut against TUF 8 contestant Kyle Kingsbury at UFC on Fuel TV 5, winning after 2 rounds by TKO due to doctor stoppage. The stoppage was declared after Kingsbury's left eye had swollen shut.

For his second fight with the promotion, Manuwa faced Cyrille Diabaté on 16 February 2013 at UFC on Fuel TV: Barão vs. McDonald. Manuwa was declared the winner (TKO) after Diabaté was unable to continue after tearing a calf muscle near the end of the first round.

Manuwa returned to face Ryan Jimmo on 26 October 2013 at UFC Fight Night 30. For the second time in a row, Manuwa's opponent injured his leg during the fight and this resulted in a TKO victory for Manuwa.

Manuwa faced Alexander Gustafsson at UFC Fight Night 37 on 8 March 2014. He lost the fight via TKO in the second round. Both participants were awarded a Fight of the Night bonus for the fight.

Manuwa was expected to face Maurício Rua at UFC Fight Night 56 on 8 November 2014 in Brazil. However, on 29 October, it was announced that Manuwa had pulled out of the fight due to an injury, and that Ovince St. Preux would replace him against Rua.

After over a year away from the sport, Manuwa returned to face Jan Błachowicz on 11 April 2015 at UFC Fight Night 64. Manuwa won the fight via unanimous decision, going the distance for the first and only time in his MMA career.

Manuwa faced Anthony Johnson on 5 September 2015 at UFC 191. He lost the fight via knockout early in the second round.

Manuwa was briefly linked to a matchup with Nikita Krylov on 27 February 2016 at UFC Fight Night 84. However, Manuwa was scratched from the contest with an undisclosed injury in late December, causing the bout to be cancelled.

Manuwa faced Ovince Saint Preux on 8 October 2016 at UFC 204. He won the fight via knockout in the second round and was awarded a Performance of the Night bonus.

Manuwa was briefly linked to a bout with Glover Teixeira at UFC 208. However, the pairing was scrapped and Manuwa eventually faced Corey Anderson on 18 March 2017 in the main event at UFC Fight Night 107. Manuwa won the fight via knockout in the first round, after briefly dropping Anderson with a jab and then finishing him with a single left hook. He was awarded a Performance of the Night bonus.

Manuwa faced Volkan Oezdemir on 29 July 2017 at UFC 214. He lost the fight by knockout in the first round.

Manuwa faced Jan Błachowicz in a rematch on 17 March 2018 at UFC Fight Night 127. He lost the fight via unanimous decision. Both participants were awarded Fight of the Night for their performance.

Manuwa was expected to face Glover Teixeira on 22 September 2018 at UFC Fight Night 137. However, Glover Teixeira pulled out this bout after suffering an injury. He was replaced by Thiago Santos. In turn, Manuwa was removed from the fight during the week leading up to the event due to a torn hamstring and replaced by Eryk Anders.

Manuwa faced Thiago Santos on 8 December 2018 at UFC 231. He lost the fight via knockout in round two.

Manuwa faced Aleksandar Rakić on 1 June 2019 at UFC Fight Night 153. He lost the fight via knockout due to a head kick in the first round.

Manuwa announced his retirement on 3 June 2019.

== Professional boxing ==
Manuwa is scheduled to compete at Jake Paul's MVP event against Alistair Overeem on 24 December 2026 at the Coca-Cola Arena in Dubai.

== Personal life ==
Manuwa's parents are Nigerian however he was born in California and spent his early years in Nigeria before settling in London at the age of 10. MTV UK did a documentary on MMA in the UK, with Manuwa, Jack Marshman and Cory Tait being filmed in the build-ups of their fights and the training and lifestyles involved.

Jimi was imprisoned for his role in a burglary ring in 2002. He was released in 2003. In 2014, Manuwa showed off his tattoos for PETA's anti-fur "Ink Not Mink" ad campaign.

== Championships and accomplishments ==
=== Mixed martial arts ===
- Ultimate Fighting Championship
  - Fight of the Night (Two times) vs. Alexander Gustafsson and Jan Błachowicz
  - Performance of the Night (Two times) vs. Ovince Saint Preux and Corey Anderson
  - UFC.com Awards
    - 2018: Ranked #7 Fight of the Year vs. Thiago Santos
- Ultimate Challenge MMA
  - UCMMA Light heavyweight Championship (One time; first)
  - Five successful title defenses
- MMAjunkie.com
  - 2018 Round of the Year (Round 1) vs. Thiago Santos
  - 2018 December Fight of the Month vs. Thiago Santos

== Mixed martial arts record ==
Professional record breakdown
23 matches	17 wins	6 losses
By knockout	15	5
By submission	1	0
By decision	1	1

Res.	Record	Opponent	Method	Event	Date	Round	Time	Location	Notes
Loss	17–6	Aleksandar Rakić	KO (head kick)	UFC Fight Night: Gustafsson vs. Smith	1 June 2019	1	0:42	Stockholm, Sweden	
Loss	17–5	Thiago Santos	KO (punches)	UFC 231	8 December 2018	2	0:41	Toronto, Ontario, Canada	
Loss	17–4	Jan Błachowicz	Decision (unanimous)	UFC Fight Night: Werdum vs. Volkov	17 March 2018	3	5:00	London, England	Fight of the Night.
Loss	17–3	Volkan Oezdemir	KO (punches)	UFC 214	29 July 2017	1	0:42	Anaheim, California, United States	UFC Light Heavyweight title eliminator.
Win	17–2	Corey Anderson	KO (punch)	UFC Fight Night: Manuwa vs. Anderson	18 March 2017	1	3:05	London, England	Performance of the Night.
Win	16–2	Ovince Saint Preux	KO (punches)	UFC 204	8 October 2016	2	2:38	Manchester, England	Performance of the Night.
Loss	15–2	Anthony Johnson	KO (punches)	UFC 191	5 September 2015	2	0:28	Las Vegas, Nevada, United States	
Win	15–1	Jan Błachowicz	Decision (unanimous)	UFC Fight Night: Gonzaga vs. Cro Cop 2	11 April 2015	3	5:00	Kraków, Poland	
Loss	14–1	Alexander Gustafsson	TKO (knee and punches)	UFC Fight Night: Gustafsson vs. Manuwa	8 March 2014	2	1:18	London, England	Fight of the Night.
Win	14–0	Ryan Jimmo	TKO (leg injury)	UFC Fight Night: Machida vs. Munoz	26 October 2013	2	4:41	Manchester, England	
Win	13–0	Cyrille Diabaté	TKO (retirement)	UFC on Fuel TV: Barão vs. McDonald	16 February 2013	1	5:00	London, England	
Win	12–0	Kyle Kingsbury	TKO (doctor stoppage)	UFC on Fuel TV: Struve vs. Miocic	29 September 2012	2	5:00	Nottingham, England	
Win	11–0	Antony Rea	TKO (retirement)	BAMMA 8	10 December 2011	1	5:00	Nottingham, England	
Win	10–0	Nick Chapman	TKO (knees)	UCMMA 24: Hands of War	22 October 2011	1	2:14	London, England	Defended the UCMMA Light heavyweight Championship.
Win	9–0	Valentino Petrescu	KO (punch)	UCMMA 14: Invincible	7 August 2010	1	3:08	London, England	Defended the UCMMA Light heavyweight Championship.
Win	8–0	Reza Meldavian	TKO (punches)	UCMMA 12: Never Back Down	8 May 2010	1	3:19	London, England	Defended the UCMMA Light heavyweight Championship.
Win	7–0	Shaun Lomas	TKO (punches)	UCMMA 9: Fighting for Heroes	5 December 2009	1	3:58	London, England	Defended the UCMMA Light heavyweight Championship.
Win	6–0	Luke Blythe	KO (punch)	UCMMA 6: Payback	22 August 2009	2	4:22	London, England	Defended the UCMMA Light heavyweight Championship.
Win	5–0	Ryan Robinson	TKO (punches)	UCMMA 4: Relentless	9 May 2009	1	2:03	London, England	Won the UCMMA Light heavyweight Championship.
Win	4–0	Jamie Hearn	Submission (guillotine choke)	UCMMA 2: Unbreakable	7 February 2009	1	1:49	London, England	
Win	3–0	Chris Greig	TKO (punches)	UCMMA 1: Unbreakable	6 December 2008	2	1:35	London, England	
Win	2–0	Dave Rintoul	TKO (punch)	FX3 9	13 September 2008	1	3:10	Reading, England	
Win	1–0	Tom King	TKO (punches)	FCFN 8	26 July 2008	1	4:25	Portsmouth, England	

== Professional boxing record ==
1 fight	1 win	0 losses
By knockout	1	0

No.	Result	Record	Opponent	Type	Round, time	Date	Location	Notes
1	Win	1–0	Chase Sherman	TKO	2 (4), 1:52	29 Aug 2026	Kia Center, Orlando, Florida, U.S.	

== See also ==
- List of current UFC fighters
- List of male mixed martial artists
