= Neil Grove =

South African MMA fighter

- Born: 18 January 1971 (age 55); Klerksdorp, South Africa
- Other names: Goliath
- Nationality: South African; English
- Height: 6 ft 6 in (1.98 m)
- Weight: 264 lb (120 kg; 18 st 12 lb)
- Division: Heavyweight
- Reach: 78.0 in (198 cm)
- Stance: Orthodox
- Fighting out of: London, England
- Rank: Shodan Black belt in Gōjū-ryū; Brown belt in Brazilian Jiu-Jitsu
- Years active: 2006 - present

Mixed martial arts record
- Total: 21
- Wins: 12
- By knockout: 12
- Losses: 8
- By knockout: 1
- By submission: 3
- By decision: 4
- Draws: 1

Other information
- Mixed martial arts record from Sherdog

Neil Grove (born 18 January 1971) is a South African-English Heavyweight professional mixed martial artist. A professional competitor since 2006, Grove has competed for the UFC, Bellator Cage Rage, UCMMA, and the SFL.

== Background ==
Originally from South Africa, Grove began competing in rugby at a young age. Having attended eight different schools growing up, Grove was frequently bullied being the "new kid," and often got into fights as a result. In 1996, Grove moved to London, England, where he worked as a personal trainer, sports therapist, and also worked as a bouncer at an Irish nightclub in South London. In 2000, after Grove and a fellow bouncer were involved in a massive brawl at the nightclub, the two men were forced to take Goju-ryu classes at Daigaku Karate Kai as a way of learning control and self-restraint. Grove soon developed a love for the martial art, which, as a combat-style karate, involves throws and submission wrestling. A year after receiving his black belt in 2005, Grove transitioned into Sambo, Brazilian jiu-jitsu and mixed martial arts.

== Mixed martial arts career ==
=== Early career ===
Grove made his professional debut at UKMMAC 17: Iron Circle on 16 November 2006, beating Anthony Okorie by TKO. He next fought at UKMMAC 18: Fists of Fury against Denniston Sutherland, who was 30 kg lighter than Grove at the time. Grove won by TKO in the first round.

=== Cage Rage ===
On 14 July 2007, Grove made his Cage Rage debut at Cage Rage 22: Hard as Hell, stepping in on two days notice to fight PRIDE veteran James Thompson. Grove knocked out the heavily favored Thompson in just 10 seconds of the first round. Grove followed up with two more stoppages in Cage Rage before facing former Cage Rage heavyweight champion Rob Broughton. Grove lost the bout by majority decision.

Grove fought in a rematch against Robert Berry at Cage Rage 27: Step Up on 12 July 2008. He won via TKO in the second round. After the fight, Grove called out both Mostapha Al-turk and Kimbo Slice. Grove and Al-turk were scheduled for a heavyweight title fight before Cage Rage closed down.

=== Ultimate Challenge MMA ===
After Cage Rage fell, Grove went on to Dave O'Donnell's new promotion: Ultimate Challenge MMA. On their very first event, Grove defeated James McSweeney via TKO to win the inaugural Ultimate Challenge Heavyweight title.

=== Ultimate Fighting Championship ===
On 16 December 2008, Grove announced that he was signing a four-fight deal with the Ultimate Fighting Championship. Grove expressed interest in fighting fellow European standout Mostapha al-Turk, who has also signed with the UFC.

He lost his long-awaited UFC debut UFC 95 in London, England, to Mike Ciesnolevicz via Heel hook submission early in the first round. Grove was released from his UFC contract in May.

=== Return to Ultimate Challenge MMA ===
After being released from the UFC, he returned to UCMMA as their Heavyweight Champion. Grove defeated Martin Thompson to retain his title.

He then fought to a draw with Stav Economou at Ultimate Challenge MMA: Never Back Down.

=== Bellator ===
Grove made his Bellator and U.S. debut against Eddie Sanchez, winning via TKO (Punches) at 1:32 of round 1.

He next faced Alexey Oleynik at Bellator 29 and won via TKO at 0:45 in the first round. This win earned Grove a spot in the finals of the Bellator Heavyweight Tournament, where he faced undefeated wrestler Cole Konrad. Grove lost the fight via submission in the first round.

Grove was scheduled to make his return to the promotion at Bellator 43 where he would face The Ultimate Fighter 10 alumnus Zak Jensen. However, Grove pulled out of the bout due to an injury. Grove instead fought Jensen at Bellator 47. He won the fight via TKO in the first round.

Grove entered the Bellator Season Five Heavyweight Tournament. He faced Mike Hayes at Bellator 52 and lost the back-and-forth bout via split decision.

Grove faced Thiago Santos at Bellator 56 in the semi-finals after Blagoi Ivanov pulled out of the bout due to an injury. He lost the fight via submission in the first round.

=== Super Fight League ===
Grove faced Todd Duffee in the main event at SFL 2. He lost via TKO at 34 seconds in the first round.

=== Third run in UCMMA ===
Grove was scheduled to return to UCMMA at UCMMA 31 to face Darren Towler for the UCMMA heavyweight title, but Towler had to retire before the match due to a serious shoulder injury, being replaced by Tomasz Czerwinski making the match for the interim heavyweight title.

Grove snapped his three fight losing streak, knocking out Czerwinski in the first round.

=== Bellator return ===
After being away from the sport for two and a half years, Grove is scheduled to return in July 2016. He faced James Mulheron at Bellator 158 on 16 July 2016. Grove lost the fight by unanimous decision.

Grove was scheduled to face Łukasz Parobiec on 19 May 2017 at Bellator 170. However, the fight was cancelled for undisclosed reasons.

== Championships and accomplishments ==
- Ultimate Challenge MMA
  - Ultimate Challenge MMA Heavyweight Championship (One time)
  - Ultimate Challenge MMA Interim Heavyweight Championship (Current)
- Bellator Fighting Championship
  - Bellator Season Three Heavyweight Tournament Runner up

== Mixed martial arts record ==
Professional record breakdown
21 matches	12 wins	8 losses
By knockout	12	1
By submission	0	3
By decision	0	4
Draws	1	

Res.	Record	Opponent	Method	Event	Date	Round	Time	Location	Notes
Loss	12–8–1	James Mulheron	Decision (unanimous)	Bellator 158	16 July 2016	3	5:00	London, England	
Loss	12–7–1	Shamil Abdurakhimov	Decision (unanimous)	Tech-Krep FC: Southern Front 2	4 October 2013	3	5:00	Krasnodar, Russia	
Win	12–6–1	Tomasz Czerwinski	KO (punches)	UCMMA 31	1 December 2012	1	2:59	London, England, United Kingdom	Won the Interim UCMMA Heavyweight Championship.
Loss	11–6–1	Todd Duffee	TKO (punches)	SFL 2	7 April 2012	1	0:34	Chandigarh, India	
Loss	11–5–1	Thiago dos Santos	Submission (rear-naked choke)	Bellator 56	29 October 2011	1	0:38	Kansas City, Kansas, United States	Bellator Season Five Heavyweight Tournament Semifinal; Replaced an injured Blagoi Ivanov.
Loss	11–4–1	Mike Hayes	Decision (split)	Bellator 52	1 October 2011	3	5:00	Lake Charles, Louisiana, United States	Bellator Season Five Heavyweight Tournament Quarterfinal.
Win	11–3–1	Zak Jensen	TKO (punches)	Bellator 47	23 July 2011	1	2:00	Rama, Ontario, Canada	
Loss	10–3–1	Cole Konrad	Submission (americana)	Bellator 32	14 October 2010	1	4:45	Kansas City, Missouri, United States	Bellator Season 3 Heavyweight Tournament Final. For the inaugural Bellator Heavyweight World Championship.
Win	10–2–1	Alexey Oleynik	TKO (punches)	Bellator 29	16 September 2010	1	0:45	Milwaukee, Wisconsin, United States	Bellator Season 3 Heavyweight Tournament Semifinal.
Win	9–2–1	Eddie Sanchez	TKO (referee stoppage)	Bellator 24	12 August 2010	1	1:32	Hollywood, Florida, United States	Bellator Season 3 Heavyweight Tournament Quarterfinal.
Draw	8–2–1	Stav Economou	Draw	UCMMA 12: Never Back Down	8 May 2010	3	5:00	London, England	For the UCMMA Heavyweight Championship.
Win	8–2	Martin Thompson	TKO (punches)	UCMMA 8: Dynamite	25 October 2009	1	0:53	London, England	Retained the UCMMA Heavyweight Championship
Loss	7–2	Mike Ciesnolevicz	Submission (inverted heel hook)	UFC 95	21 February 2009	1	1:03	London, England	
Win	7–1	James McSweeney	KO (punches)	UCMMA 1: Bad Breed	7 December 2008	2	1:38	London, England	Won UCMMA Heavyweight Championship.
Win	6–1	Robert Berry	TKO (punches)	Cage Rage 27	12 July 2008	2	1:29	London, England	
Loss	5–1	Rob Broughton	Decision (majority)	Cage Rage 25	8 March 2008	3	5:00	London, England	
Win	5–0	Robert Berry	TKO (corner stoppage)	Cage Rage 24	1 December 2007	1	5:00	London, England	
Win	4–0	Domagoj Ostojic	TKO (punches)	Cage Rage 23	22 September 2007	1	0:34	London, England	
Win	3–0	James Thompson	KO (punch)	Cage Rage 22	14 July 2007	1	0:10	London, England	
Win	2–0	Denniston Sutherland	TKO (punches)	UKMMAC 18: Fists of Fury	25 February 2007	1	3:05	Purfleet, England	
Win	1–0	Anthony Okorie	TKO (punches)	UKMMAC 17: Iron Circle	26 November 2006	1	0:54	England	

== See also ==
- List of current mixed martial arts champions
- List of male mixed martial artists
