= John Maguire (fighter) =

English mixed martial arts fighter

- Born: 19 May 1983 (age 43); Peterborough, England
- Other names: The One
- Nationality: British
- Height: 5 ft 9 in (1.75 m)
- Weight: 170 lb (77 kg; 12 st)
- Division: Lightweight (2013–present); Welterweight (2010–2012); Middleweight (2006–2009)
- Reach: 70 in (180 cm)
- Fighting out of: Cambridge, England, UK
- Team: Tsunami Gym
- Years active: 2006–present

Mixed martial arts record
- Total: 39
- Wins: 26
- By knockout: 3
- By submission: 16
- By decision: 7
- Losses: 13
- By knockout: 5
- By decision: 8

Other information
- Mixed martial arts record from Sherdog
- Last updated on: 21 September 2011

John Maguire (born 19 May 1983) is an English mixed martial artist currently competing in Cage Warriors' Welterweight division. A professional competitor since 2006, Maguire has also competed for the UFC, Cage Rage, BAMMA, Absolute Championship Berkut, Konfrontacja Sztuk Walki, and UCMMA. Maguire is the former UCMMA Welterweight Champion.

== Background ==
Maguire is from Peterborough, England, and was first exposed to mixed martial arts growing up, watching UFC events with his brother. A member of the English gypsy community, he left school when he was only 13 years old and taught himself how to read and write, while working in the logging and timber industry with his father, as well as working various other jobs before becoming a professional fighter.

== Mixed martial arts career ==
=== Early career ===
Maguire made his professional MMA debut in April 2006. Over the next two years, he won all eight of his first bouts via TKO or submission with no fight going past the second round. Before signing with the UFC, he added an additional eight wins and three losses to his MMA record. He won the UCMMA Welterweight Championship on 18 September 2010, at UCMMA 15: Showdown, defeating Henrique Santana via TKO. He has defended it three times since then.

He holds victories over domestic UK standouts TUF 9 alumnus Dean Amasinger, UCMMA UK1 Welterweight Champion Peter Irving, UK MMA veteran Jamaine Facey and two wins over current UCMMA Middleweight Champion and UCMMA Welterweight Champion Jake Bostwick.

=== Ultimate Fighting Championship ===
Maguire was scheduled to make his UFC debut against James Head at UFC 138. However, Head was forced to withdraw due to injury and he instead took on The Ultimate Fighter 13 veteran Justin Edwards. Maguire won the fight via unanimous decision.

Maguire fought The Ultimate Fighter 9 finalist, DaMarques Johnson, at UFC on Fuel TV 2 on 14 April 2012. He won the fight by submission via armbar at 4:40 of the second frame. His performance was awarded with Submission of the Night honors.

Maguire lost via unanimous decision to John Hathaway on 29 September 2012 at UFC on Fuel TV 5. Maguire faced Matthew Riddle at UFC 154, stepping in to replace an injured Besam Yousef. Maguire lost the fight via unanimous decision. He then faced Mitch Clarke in his Lightweight debut on 15 June 2013 at UFC 161. He lost the bout by unanimous decision. He was subsequently released from the promotion afterwards.

=== Cage Warriors ===
Following his UFC release, Maguire signed with Cage Warriors on 31 October 2013. He made his debut against Philip Mulpeter at Cage Warriors 63 on 31 December 2013. He won the fight via unanimous decision.

He then faced Saul Rogers at Cage Warriors 65 on 1 March 2014. In a shocking upset, Rogers would defeat the heavy favorite Maguire via unanimous decision.

Maguire made a quick turnaround and faced Damir Hadžović at Cage Warriors 66 on 22 March 2014. He lost the fight via TKO in the first round.

== Championships and accomplishments ==
- Olympian MMA Championships
  - OMMAC Welterweight Championship (One time)
- Ultimate Challenge MMA
  - UCMMA Welterweight Championship (One time)
- Ultimate Fighting Championship
  - Submission of the Night (One time) vs. DaMarques Johnson

== Mixed martial arts record ==
Professional record breakdown
39 matches	26 wins	13 losses
By knockout	3	5
By submission	16	0
By decision	7	8

Res.	Record	Opponent	Method	Event	Date	Round	Time	Location	Notes
Loss	26–13	Sam Boult	Decision (split)	Caged Steel FC 23	13 July 2019	3	5:00	Sheffield, England	
Loss	26–12	Brad Wheeler	TKO (punches)	Cage Warriors 102	2 March 2019	2	2:43	London, England	
Loss	26–11	Stefano Paternò	KO (punch)	IFC 3	5 May 2018	1	2:46	Milan, Italy	For IFC Welterweight Championship.
Win	26–10	Leonardo Damiani	Submission (guillotine choke)	Legio's Team Bergamo: Venkon Fight Night 2	21 January 2018	1	2:48	Milan, Italy	
Loss	25–10	Tommy Depret	TKO (punches)	Cage Warriors 89	25 November 2017	3	3:10	Antwerp, Belgium	
Win	25–9	Shah Hussain	Submission (heel hook)	Rise of Champions 4	30 September 2017	2	3:05	Brentwood, England	
Loss	24–9	Borys Mańkowski	Decision (unanimous)	KSW 37: Circus of Pain	3 December 2016	3	5:00	Kraków, Poland	For the KSW Welterweight Championship.
Win	24–8	Kieran Malone	Submission (Kimura)	ACB 47: Braveheart: Young Eagles 14	1 October 2016	3	4:31	Glasgow, Scotland	
Win	23–8	Colin Fletcher	Submission (Armbar)	M4TC 21 Supremacy	25 June 2016	3	1:03	Tyne and Wear, England	Won M4TC Welterweight Championship.
Win	22–8	Vincent del Guerra	Submission (Rear-Naked Choke)	British Challenge MMA 15	7 May 2016	1	0:55	Colchester, Essex, England	
Win	21–8	Aymard Guih	Decision (unanimous)	British Challenge MMA 14	20 February 2016	3	5:00	Colchester, Essex, England	Return to Welterweight.
Win	20–8	Alexandre Roumette	Submission (kimura)	British Challenge MMA 12	3 October 2015	1	3:09	Colchester, Essex, England	Catchweight (165 lbs) bout.
Loss	19–8	Damir Hadžović	KO (knees and punches)	Cage Warriors Fighting Championship 66	22 March 2014	1	3:58	Ballerup, Denmark	
Loss	19–7	Saul Rogers	Decision (unanimous)	Cage Warriors Fighting Championship 65	1 March 2014	3	5:00	Dublin, Leinster, Ireland	
Win	19–6	Philip Mulpeter	Decision (unanimous)	Cage Warriors Fighting Championship 63	31 December 2013	3	5:00	Dublin, Leinster, Ireland	Catchweight (161 lbs) bout.
Loss	18–6	Mitch Clarke	Decision (unanimous)	UFC 161	15 June 2013	3	5:00	Winnipeg, Manitoba, Canada	Lightweight debut.
Loss	18–5	Matthew Riddle	Decision (unanimous)	UFC 154	17 November 2012	3	5:00	Montreal, Quebec, Canada	
Loss	18–4	John Hathaway	Decision (unanimous)	UFC on Fuel TV: Struve vs. Miocic	29 September 2012	3	5:00	Nottingham, England	
Win	18–3	DaMarques Johnson	Submission (armbar)	UFC on Fuel TV: Gustafsson vs. Silva	14 April 2012	2	4:40	Stockholm, Sweden	Submission of the Night.
Win	17–3	Justin Edwards	Decision (unanimous)	UFC 138	5 November 2011	3	5:00	Birmingham, England	
Win	16–3	Peter Irving	Decision (unanimous)	UCMMA 23: Go 4 It	17 September 2011	3	5:00	London, England	Defended UCMMA Welterweight Championship.
Win	15–3	Jamaine Facey	Submission (kimura)	UCMMA 20: Fists of Fire	14 May 2011	2	4:23	London, England	Defended UCMMA Welterweight Championship.
Win	14–3	Dean Amasinger	Submission (rear-naked choke)	UCMMA 18: Face Off	5 February 2011	2	3:28	London, England	Defended UCMMA Welterweight Championship.
Win	13–3	Henrique Santana	TKO (doctor stoppage)	UCMMA 15: Showdown	18 September 2010	2	1:25	London, England	Won UCMMA Welterweight Championship.
Win	12–3	Wayne Murrie	Decision (split)	OMMAC 6	7 August 2010	3	5:00	Liverpool, England	Won OMMAC Welterweight Championship.
Loss	11–3	Simeon Thoresen	Decision (unanimous)	BAMMA 3	15 May 2010	3	5:00	Birmingham, England	
Win	11–2	Edgelson Lua	Decision (split)	UCMMA 10: Resurrection	6 February 2010	3	5:00	London, England	Welterweight debut.
Loss	10–2	Tom Watson	TKO (punches)	BAMMA 1	27 June 2009	3	2:47	London, England	
Win	10–1	Chris Rice	Decision (unanimous)	CG 10: Clash of the Titans	29 November 2008	3	5:00	Liverpool, England	
Win	9–1	Lee Austin	Submission	UK: Cage Fighting Championships	29 June 2008	1	4:20	Coventry, England	
Loss	8–1	Arman Gambaryan	Decision (unanimous)	WAFC: World Pankration Championship 2008	24 May 2008	2	5:00	Khabarovsk, Russia	
Win	8–0	Andy Costello	Submission (rear-naked choke)	Pain and Glory: ExCeL London	26 April 2008	1	N/A	London, England	
Win	7–0	Jake Bostwick	Submission (kimura)	Cage Rage Contenders 6	18 August 2007	1	4:00	London, England	
Win	6–0	Jake Bostwick	TKO (punches)	Cage Rage Contenders 5	16 June 2007	1	N/A	East London, England	
Win	5–0	Alex Korsters	TKO	Intense Fighting	12 May 2007	2	3:30	Peterborough, England	
Win	4–0	Ed Garass	Submission (rear-naked choke)	UKMMAC 18: Fists of Fury	25 February 2007	1	0:55	Purfleet, England	
Win	3–0	Michael Pastou	Submission (rear-naked choke)	Intense Fighting: Caged	11 November 2006	1	2:46	England	
Win	2–0	Bill Mutch	Submission (rear-naked choke)	Intense Fighting 5	19 August 2006	1	2:05	England	
Win	1–0	Lee Webber	Technical Submission	Intense Fighting 3	1 April 2006	2	0:27	England	
