= Dave O'Donnell (MMA promoter) =

Mixed martial arts promoter

- Born: London, England
- Occupation: Promoter
- Known for: Cage Rage Presenter, Ultimate Challenge MMA Promoter
- Height: 5 ft 6 in (168 cm)

Dave O'Donnell (born in London, England) is a mixed martial arts promoter, best known for his role in the Cage Rage promotion. He is currently the CEO and founder of Ultimate Challenge MMA.

== Cage Rage ==
Cage Rage Championships, also known as Cage Rage, was a United Kingdom-based, mixed martial arts promotion that premiered on 7 September 2002 in London. Cage Rage went bankrupt and is now no longer trading. Cage Rage had been owned and managed by Elite XC until that company ceased operating, and the British promoters behind Cage Rage formed a new organization, Ultimate Challenge MMA, and withdrew all the old Cage Rage titles. Matchmaker and on-screen personality Dave O'Donnell was also a shareholder in the company. Fellow on-screen personality and co-promoter Andy Geer also owned a stake until he left the promotion in 2008. Cage Rage events were replayed on Nuts TV, along with their own weekday show on The Fight Network (UK & Ireland) until these channels closed down. Archived shows are currently shown on the Extreme Sports Channel.

== UCMMA ==
Ultimate Challenge MMA (also known as UCMMA), is a mixed martial arts promotion in England. The organization was formed in 2008 By former Cage Rage executive Dave O’Donnell following the demise of Cage Rage's parent company, EliteXC. To date, all of its events have been hosted in at The Troxy in London, England.
