= Jason Barrett (actor) =

English actor and mixed martial arts fighter

- Born: Jason Barrett; 27 March 1976 (age 50); London, United Kingdom
- Other names: Badass
- Nationality: British
- Height: 5 ft 10 in (1.78 m)
- Weight: 185 lb (84 kg; 13.2 st)
- Division: Welterweight (2005–2010) Middleweight (2011)
- Fighting out of: London, England
- Years active: 2005–present

Mixed martial arts record
- Total: 10
- Wins: 3
- By knockout: 3
- Losses: 7
- By knockout: 3
- By submission: 3
- By disqualification: 1

Other information
- Mixed martial arts record from Sherdog
- Last updated on: 3 August 2011

Jason Barrett (born 27 March 1976) is a Jamaican-British actor, script writer, mixed martial artist and former criminal, who served six years of imprisonment.

== Acting career ==
He has had featured roles in hit soaps EastEnders, The Bill and in the feature film The Big I Am to be released in 2010. He also performed on stage, in Angie Le Mar's hit play, The Brothers where he played Kenny Ellis. The Brothers broke box office records at London's Hackney Empire, the show was broadcast on MTV April 2009.

Jason is also the Writer and Director of The Naked Poet, a feature film due for release winter 2012, Starring Petra Letang, Michael Harvey, Kyla Frye, Aml Ameen, Kelle Bryan, Michelle Gayle and Mohammed George.

== Mixed martial arts career ==
To date, he has had 10 fights since his first professional fight in 2005, with a record of 3 wins and 7 losses. His only wins have come from a referee stoppage against Mindaugas Arbocius, a TKO win against Nigel Whitear and a knockout (punch) against Mark Carling. Barrett has fought as a welterweight, fighting mostly for the now defunct Cage Rage and currently for UCMMA.

=== Vs. Alex Reid ===
For many weeks, Barrett had been calling out Alex Reid, following him to his gym and demanding to fight with him, and attempted to fight him inside the UCMMA cage during an interview between Reid and UCMMA owner Dave O'Donnell. In one incident, Barrett took a megaphone down to a restaurant on Old Compton Street in Soho to interrupt Reid and his girlfriend Chantelle Houghton, who were dining there. Reid's security went outside to ask him to leave Reid alone, but refused to move. This then prompted Reid to walk outside, and ended up with Barrett attacking Reid's security, attempting to go for Reid. After being pulled away from each other, Barrett vowed he would 'follow him everywhere until he signed the contract'. Reid verbally agreed.

Barrett faced Alex Reid in a Middleweight 'Super Title' fight at the UCMMA 22 – Warriors Creed event on 6 August 2011. This was his first fight since his KO win over the debuting Mark Carling and his Middleweight debut.

During the press conference, Barrett apologised for his antics in obtaining the match-up with Reid, discouraged anyone else from doing the same, and vowed to knock Reid out. At the end of the conference, Dave O'Donnell asked them both to square up and pose for photos. Barrett put his hands up as requested, but Reid refused, instead standing up close to Barrett's face, and Barrett pushed him away. Reid began walking away, but O'Donnell asked him to come back, which he did, and both men squared up. Because of Barrett pushing Reid, Dave O'Donnell vowed to take 10% of Barrett's fight purse for every time he engaged in antics like that.

During the weigh-ins the day prior to the fight, both men weighed in at just under the 185 pound mark. For the camera shot of both men squared up to each other, Reid again refused to put his hands up, and this time, Reid kissed Barrett on the lips, which infuriated Barrett, who had to be held back by UCMMA officials. Reid was laughing at his reaction, and vowed he would apologise 'after the fight'.

Barrett lost the fight to Reid in the first round due to submission via triangle choke.

== Conviction ==
In June 2012, in a planned police operation, Barrett was arrested with another man, Kayhan Kiani, after an illegally supplied gun was passed to a man in a car. Weapons were seized in the operation. Barrett was charged with firearms offences. In 2013 he pleaded guilty and was sentenced to six years and a half years imprisonment.

== Filmography ==
- EastEnders as DC Lowe (TV series) (2006)
- The Brothers as Kenny Ellis (TV series) (2009)
- The Big I Am as Psycho (2010)
- The Naked Poet as Lazarus (2012)

== Mixed martial arts record ==
Professional record breakdown
10 matches	3 wins	7 losses
By knockout	3	3
By submission	0	3
By disqualification	0	1

Res.	Record	Opponent	Method	Event	Date	Round	Time	Location	Notes
Loss	3–7	Alex Reid	Submission (triangle choke)	UCMMA 22: Warrior Creed	August 6, 2011	1	02:19	London, UK	'Super Title' fight. Middleweight bout.
Win	3–6	Mark Carling	KO (punch)	UCMMA 15: Showdown	September 18, 2010	1	02:18	England, UK	
Loss	2–6	Joe Mac	TKO (punches)	Cage Rage Contenders 9	April 12, 2008	1	03:38	England, UK	
Loss	2–5	Scott Janson	TKO (retirement)	Cage Rage Contenders 8	February 2, 2008	1	05:00	England, UK	
Loss	2–4	Nigel Whitear	Submission (armbar)	FX3: Fight Night 4	March 10, 2007	1	N/A	England, UK	
Loss	2–3	Jack Toczydlowski	TKO (doctor stoppage)	Cage Rage 20	February 10, 2007	1	04:04	London, UK	
Win	2–2	Nigel Whitear	TKO (punches)	Cage Rage Contenders 2	August 20, 2006	2	02:31	England, UK	
Loss	1–2	Jeremy Bailey	DQ (hair pulling)	Cage Rage 16	April 22, 2006	1	04:50	England, UK	
Win	1–1	Mindaugas Arbocius	TKO (referee stoppage)	Cage Rage 15	February 4, 2006	1	01:15	England, UK	
Loss	0–1	David Lee	Submission (rear naked choke)	Cage Rage 12	July 2, 2005	1	04:28	England, UK	
