= Jason Young (fighter) =

English mixed martial artist

- Born: 28 June 1986 (age 40); Lewisham, England
- Other names: Shotgun
- Nationality: English
- Height: 5 ft 9 in (1.75 m)
- Weight: 145 lb (66 kg; 10 st 5 lb)
- Division: Featherweight
- Reach: 73 in (185 cm)
- Fighting out of: South East London, England
- Team: Team Titan
- Trainer: Kieran Keddle
- Years active: 2006 – present

Mixed martial arts record
- Total: 15
- Wins: 9
- By knockout: 3
- By submission: 1
- By decision: 5
- Losses: 6
- By knockout: 1
- By submission: 3
- By decision: 2

Other information
- Mixed martial arts record from Sherdog

Jason Young (born 28 June 1986) is an English mixed martial artist. He currently trains at Team Titan and American Top Team.

== Early life ==
Born in Lewisham, England, Young started fighting at age 17 to stay out of trouble in the streets. Before he started fighting professionally, Young worked as a plasterer.

== Mixed martial arts career ==
=== Early career ===
Young became a professional fighter in 2006 and fought the first five fights of his career in Cage Rage - Contenders, building up a record of 4-1. He then moved on to fight three fights in Ultimate Challenge MMA, winning their Lightweight title and accomplishing a notable win over Abdul Mohamed by way of majority decision. Young then fought fellow current UFC fighter, and yet unbeaten, Paul Sass, in Olympian MMA Championship, tapping out to a heel hook at 2:01 of the first round.

=== Ultimate Fighting Championship ===
Young signed with the UFC as a late replacement for Rani Yahya to fight Dustin Poirier at UFC 131 on 11 June 2011. Young lost the fight via unanimous decision.

Young next faced Michihiro Omigawa on 5 November 2011 at UFC 138 and lost via unanimous decision.

Young was expected to face Akira Corassani at UFC on Fuel TV 2. However, Corassani was forced out of the bout with an injury and replaced by Eric Wisely. He won the fight via unanimous decision, his first UFC victory.

Young faced Robbie Peralta on 29 September 2012 at UFC on Fuel TV 5. During the very first round, Peralta dropped Young with a vicious right hand followed by some devastating ground and pound which knocked Young out cold, giving Young his first KO loss. After the loss, Young was released from the promotion.

== Championships and achievements ==
- UCMMA K1 Champion

== Mixed martial arts record ==
Professional record breakdown
15 matches	9 wins	6 losses
By knockout	3	1
By submission	1	3
By decision	5	2

Res.	Record	Opponent	Method	Event	Date	Round	Time	Location	Notes
Loss	9–6	Robbie Peralta	KO (punches)	UFC on Fuel TV: Struve vs. Miocic	29 September 2012	1	0:23	Nottingham, England	
Win	9–5	Eric Wisely	Decision (unanimous)	UFC on Fuel TV: Gustafsson vs. Silva	14 April 2012	3	5:00	Stockholm, Sweden	
Loss	8–5	Michihiro Omigawa	Decision (unanimous)	UFC 138	5 November 2011	3	5:00	Birmingham, England	
Loss	8–4	Dustin Poirier	Decision (unanimous)	UFC 131	11 June 2011	3	5:00	Vancouver, British Columbia, Canada	
Win	8–3	Jorge Britto	Decision (unanimous)	MMA 1: The Reckoning	2 April 2011	3	5:00	Orillia, Ontario, Canada	The Score Fighting Series Fight of the Year 2011
Win	7–3	Sergej Grecicho	Decision (unanimous)	Cage Warriors 38: Young Guns	1 October 2010	3	5:00	North London, England	
Loss	6–3	Paul Sass	Submission (heel hook)	OMMAC 4: Victorious	3 June 2010	1	2:01	Liverpool, England	
Win	6–2	Abdul Mohamed	Decision (majority)	UCMMA 8: Dynamite	24 October 2009	3	5:00	London, England	
Win	5–2	Jordan Miller	TKO (corner stoppage)	UCMMA 3: Unstoppable	28 March 2009	2	5:00	London, England	
Loss	4–2	Tim Radcliffe	Submission (rear-naked choke)	UCMMA 1: Bad Breed	6 December 2008	1	3:03	London, England	
Win	4–1	Francis Heagney	Decision (unanimous)	Cage Rage 27	12 July 2008	3	5:00	London, England	
Win	3–1	Jody Cottham	TKO (punches)	Cage Rage Contenders 9	12 April 2008	1	3:02	United Kingdom	
Win	2–1	Michael King	TKO (punches)	Cage Rage Contenders 7	10 November 2007	2	0:48	London, England	
Loss	1–1	Steven Elliot	Submission (armbar)	Cage Rage Contenders 3	12 November 2006	1	3:59	London, England	
Win	1–0	Paul Phipps	Submission (punches)	Cage Rage Contenders 2	20 August 2006	1	0:26	South London, England	

== See also ==
- List of current UFC fighters
- List of male mixed martial artists
