= Eric Wisely =

American mixed martial arts (MMA) fighter

- Born: July 25, 1984 (age 42); East Moline, Illinois, United States
- Other names: Little Lee
- Height: 5 ft 8 in (1.73 m)
- Weight: 155 lb (70 kg; 11.1 st)
- Division: Featherweight; Lightweight; Welterweight
- Reach: 71.0 in (180 cm)
- Stance: Southpaw
- Fighting out of: Clinton, Iowa, United States
- Team: Team Conquest
- Rank: Black belt in Tae Kwon Do; Black belt in Kickboxing
- Years active: 2006–present

Mixed martial arts record
- Total: 44
- Wins: 34
- By knockout: 14
- By submission: 5
- By decision: 10
- Unknown: 5
- Losses: 9
- By submission: 1
- By decision: 8
- Draws: 1

Other information
- Mixed martial arts record from Sherdog

Eric Wisely (born July 25, 1984) is an American professional mixed martial artist who formerly competed in the Lightweight division of the UFC. A professional competitor since 2006, Wisely has also fought for the Bellator and Strikeforce.

== Mixed martial arts career ==
=== Early career ===
Wisely compiled an amateur record of 6-1 before making his professional mixed martial arts debut on December 21, 2006, against Chriss Woodruff at Midwest King of the Cage 40. Wisely won his debut in the first round. Following this win, Wisely compiled a record of 18–5 before signing with Strikeforce in mid-2011.

=== Strikeforce ===
In mid-2011, Wisely signed with now-defunct promotion Strikeforce. He made his debut against Pat Healy at Strikeforce Challengers: Gurgel vs. Duarte on August 12, 2011. He lost the fight via unanimous decision.

=== Ultimate Fighting Championship ===
Wisely made his UFC debut against Charles Oliveira in a Featherweight bout on January 28, 2012, at UFC on Fox: Evans vs. Davis. He lost the bout via submission in the first round.

Wisely replacing an injured Akira Corassani and faced Jason Young on April 14, 2012, at UFC on Fuel TV 2. He lost the fight via unanimous decision and was subsequently released from the promotion.

=== Bellator MMA ===
Wisely faced John Alessio on the Bellator 119 card on May 9, 2014, in Ontario, Canada. Wisely lost the fight via unanimous decision.

=== Return to UFC ===
Wisely was expected to face Gilbert Burns on April 27, 2019 at UFC on ESPN 3. However, it was reported on April 18, 2019 that Wisely pulled out of the bout due to a failed physical caused by heart problems. He was replaced by newcomer Mike Davis.

== Mixed martial arts record ==
Professional record breakdown
43 matches	34 wins	9 losses
By knockout	14	0
By submission	5	1
By decision	10	8
Unknown	5	0

Res.	Record	Opponent	Method	Event	Date	Round	Time	Location	Notes
Win	34–9–1	Frank Schuman	TKO	Caged Aggression 27: Return of the Champions Day 1	September 11, 2020	2	1:19	Davenport, Iowa, United States	Return to Welterweight.
Win	33–9–1	Will Shutt	TKO (punches)	Caged Aggression 24: Champions Night 2	March 23, 2019	2	4:12	Davenport, Iowa, United States	Defended Caged Aggression Lightweight Championship.
Win	32–9–1	Joe Richardson	TKO (leg kicks)	Pinnacle Combat 29	October 13, 2018	3	3:23	Dubuque, Iowa, United States	Won the Pinnacle Combat Lightweight Championship.
Win	31–9–1	Carl Wittstock	TKO (punches)	Caged Aggression: Catfish Bend Casino Day 1	August 24, 2018	3	1:24	Burlington, Iowa, United States	Defended the Caged Aggression Lightweight Championship.
Win	30–9–1	Morgan Sickinger	Submission (armbar)	Bellator 198	April 28, 2018	1	1:12	Rosemont, Illinois, United States	Catchweight (150 lbs) bout.
Win	29–9–1	Eric Thomas	TKO (punches)	Caged Aggression 21: Thai Champions Day 2	March 10, 2018	3	4:40	Davenport, Iowa, United States	Defended Caged Aggression Lightweight Championship.
Win	28–9–1	Austin Hubbard	Decision (unanimous)	Caged Aggression 20: The Evolution	October 7, 2017	3	5:00	Davenport, Iowa, United States	Won Caged Aggression Lightweight Championship.
Win	27–9–1	John Ramirez	Submission (reverse triangle choke)	PC MMA: Pinnacle Combat 25	April 28, 2017	5	3:29	Dubuque, Iowa, United States	Return to Lightweight; defended Pinnacle Combat Lightweight Championship.
Win	26–9–1	Sean Huffman	Decision (unanimous)	Battle at the Ball Park	August 13, 2016	3	5:00	Clinton, Iowa, United States	Welterweight debut.
Win	25–9–1	Demian Papagni	TKO (punches)	Extreme Challenge 233	May 7, 2016	1	2:10	Clinton, Iowa, United States	Catchweight (160 lbs) bout.
Draw	24–9–1	Dustin Parrish	Draw (split)	PC MMA: Pinnacle Combat 22	January 23, 2016	3	5:00	Dubuque, Iowa, United States	
Win	24–9	Cliff Wright	Decision (unanimous)	PC MMA: Pinnacle Combat 21	August 21, 2015	5	5:00	Dubuque, Iowa, United States	Defended Pinnacle Combat Lightweight Championship.
Win	23–9	Jared Downing	Decision (split)	PC MMA: Pinnacle Combat 19	March 13, 2015	3	5:00	Cedar Rapids, Iowa, United States	
Loss	22–9	John Alessio	Decision (unanimous)	Bellator CXIX	May 9, 2014	3	5:00	Rama, Ontario, Canada	Catchweight (160 lbs) bout.
Win	22–8	Donnie Bell	Decision (split)	Bellator CXIII	March 21, 2014	3	5:00	Mulvane, Kansas, United States	
Win	21–8	Jeremy Castro	KO (punch)	Pinnacle Combat MMA 13	May 3, 2013	1	0:29	Dubuque, Iowa, United States	Defended Pinnacle Combat Lightweight Championship.
Win	20–8	Brian Geraghty	Decision (unanimous)	Pinnacle Combat MMA 11	November 30, 2012	5	5:00	Dubuque, Iowa, United States	Won Pinnacle Combat Lightweight Championship.
Loss	19–8	Jason Young	Decision (unanimous)	UFC on Fuel TV: Gustafsson vs. Silva	April 14, 2012	3	5:00	Stockholm, Sweden	
Loss	19–7	Charles Oliveira	Submission (reverse calf slicer)	UFC on Fox: Evans vs. Davis	January 28, 2012	1	1:43	Chicago, Illinois, United States	Featherweight debut.
Win	19–6	Brandon Girtz	TKO (arm injury)	Driller Promotions / SEG: Downtown Showdown 1	November 26, 2011	2	4:26	Minneapolis, Minnesota, United States	
Loss	18–6	Pat Healy	Decision (unanimous)	Strikeforce Challengers: Gurgel vs. Duarte	August 12, 2011	3	5:00	Las Vegas, Nevada, United States	
Win	18–5	Lance Wipf	Decision (split)	Superior Cage Combat 1	May 21, 2011	3	5:00	Las Vegas, Nevada, United States	
Win	17–5	Matt Veach	Submission (armbar)	Gladiator Cage Fights: Knockout Night 1	April 23, 2011	2	2:49	Marion, Illinois, United States	
Win	16–5	Hermes França	Decision (unanimous)	Scorpius Fighting Championships 1	September 24, 2010	3	5:00	Fort Lauderdale, Florida, United States	
Win	15–5	Lonnie Scriven	Decision (unanimous)	Glory Fighting Championships: Maximum Glory	July 9, 2010	5	5:00	Des Moines, Iowa, United States	
Loss	14–5	Ramiro Hernandez	Decision (split)	Blueblood MMA: Trials of a Gladiator 6	April 30, 2010	3	5:00	Davenport, Iowa, United States	
Win	14–4	Hermes França	TKO (punches)	Max Fights DM: Ballroom Brawl 4	January 8, 2010	1	2:03	West Des Moines, Iowa, United States	
Win	13–4	Scott McAfee	Decision (split)	Pinnacle Combat MMA 3	November 14, 2009	3	5:00	Dubuque, Iowa, United States	
Loss	12–4	Jeremy Ashley	Decision (unanimous)	Legends of Fighting 32: Strictly Business	June 6, 2009	3	5:00	Indianapolis, Indiana, United States	
Win	12–3	Cole Williams	Submission (armbar)	Pinnacle Combat MMA 2	April 25, 2009	2	2:34	Dubuque, Iowa, United States	
Loss	11–3	Ramiro Hernandez	Decision (unanimous)	WhiteApe MMA: Gorilla Warfare	October 25, 2008	3	5:00	Davenport, Iowa, United States	
Win	11–2	Tristian Hansburger	TKO (punches)	Extreme Cage Challenge	August 21, 2008	1	3:30	Clinton, Iowa, United States	
Win	10–2	Danny Rodriguez	Submission	Spring Breakage	April 28, 2008	1	N/A	Moline, Illinois, United States	
Win	9–2	Lucas Gwaltney	TKO (doctor stoppage)	Mainstream MMA 9: New Era	April 5, 2008	3	N/A	Cedar Rapids, Iowa, United States	
Win	8–2	Micah Washington	TKO (punches)	Mainstream MMA 8: Cold War	January 26, 2008	2	N/A	Cedar Rapids, Iowa, United States	
Loss	7–2	Erik Koch	Decision (unanimous)	Mainstream MMA 7: Vengeance	October 20, 2007	3	5:00	Cedar Rapids, Iowa, United States	
Win	7–1	Jason Medina	TKO (punches)	Iron Horse: Bike and Music Festival 2007	July 1, 2007	2	N/A	Sabula, Iowa, United States	
Loss	6–1	Jeremy Castro	Decision (majority)	Iron Horse: Bike and Music Festival 2007	May 27, 2007	3	5:00	Sabula, Iowa, United States	
Win	6–0	Willie Dale	KO (punches)	Ring Style: Bad Blood 2	February 17, 2007	2	N/A	Moline, Illinois United States	
Win	5–0	Brady Wakeland	N/A	Midwest King of the Ring 44	January 13, 2007	2	1:23		
Win	4–0	Alex Wakeland	N/A	Midwest King of the Ring 42	January 4, 2007	3	2:21		
Win	3–0	Cody Clayes	N/A	Midwest King of the Ring 41	December 27, 2006	1	1:16		
Win	2–0	Nathan Aber	N/A	Midwest King of the Ring 40	December 21, 2006	1	2:23		
Win	1–0	Chriss Woodruff	N/A	Midwest King of the Ring 40	December 21, 2006	1	0:41		
