= Oli Thompson =

English strongman and mixed martial arts fighter

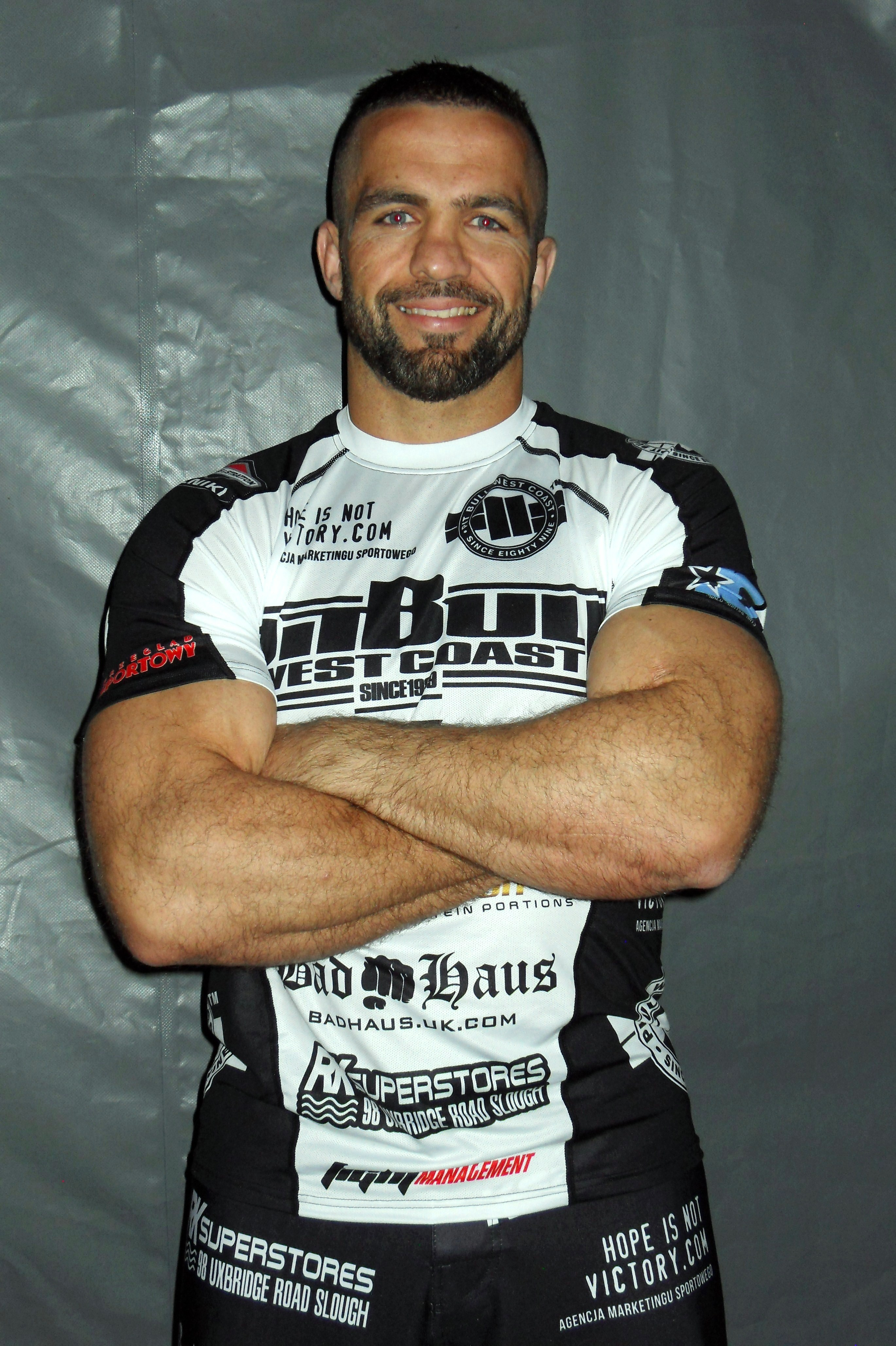
- Oli Thompson in 2016
- Born: Oliver John Thompson; 2 January 1980 (age 46); East Sussex, England
- Other names: The Spartan
- Height: 6 ft 1 in (1.85 m)
- Weight: 234 lb (106 kg; 16 st 10 lb)
- Division: Heavyweight
- Reach: 75 in (191 cm)
- Team: ZT Fight Skool
- Years active: 2009–present

Mixed martial arts record
- Total: 42
- Wins: 23
- By knockout: 15
- By submission: 4
- By decision: 3
- By disqualification: 1
- Losses: 19
- By knockout: 11
- By submission: 2
- By decision: 6

Other information
- Occupation: Mixed martial artist Strongman
- Mixed martial arts record from Sherdog

Competition record

Strongman

Representing Great Britain

World's Strongest Man
Qualified	2008 World's Strongest Man

IFSA Strongman World Championships
8th	2006

Europe's Strongest Man
Qualified	2004 Europe's Strongest Man

Representing England

Britain's Strongest Man
3rd	Britain's Strongest Man 2004
1st	Britain's Strongest Man 2006

IFSA British Championships
2nd	IFSA British Championships 2005

IFSA England's Strongest Man
3rd	IFSA England's Strongest Man 2005

Oliver Thompson (born 2 January 1980) is an English mixed martial artist and retired strongman. Thompson currently competes in MMA’s heavyweight division. He has previously competed for major organisations such as UFC, Bellator, KSW, and BAMMA. In 2006, Thompson won the title of Britain's Strongest Man.

== Background ==
Born in East Sussex to a Northern Irish father and an English mother, Thompson grew up playing rugby union at English county level. He has stated his favourite thing about rugby was weight training. Thus, when he was 19 he joined Physiques gym in Bexhill-on-Sea, East Sussex and within a matter of weeks he had broken the gym record for dead-lifting with a 260 kg lift. This prompted him to start to focus more on a strict routine of weight and strength in order to become a strength athlete. He has four children, and lives with his wife and daughters.

He is a distant cousin of the comedian Rob Beckett.

== Strongman career ==
Thompson's first competition was the 2001 UK's Strongest Man Qualifier. Although he did not qualify, he gained experience and remained focused on only competing in professional level events. In 2002 he won Kent's Strongest Man, taking first place in 5 out of 6 events. He went on to qualify in 2003 for Britain's Strongest Man ("BSM"), and in 2004 surpassed all expectations when he came third. This earned him the right to compete alongside the top strength athletes in the world at the Moscow Super Series 2004 (known as the 2004 Russia Grand Prix, although in 2004 this was not part of the WSM Super Series and again later in the year at Europe's Strongest Man in Poland).

In 2005 he opted to compete in the IFSA British Championships which was set up in direct rivalry with the BSM after IFSA parted company with the BSM and World's Strongest Man competition organiser TWI. He finished second in that competition to Mark Felix. Like many British strongmen he returned to the TWI British circuit in 2006 and won Britain's Strongest Man that year. He also competed in the 2006 IFSA World Championship where he made the final and came eighth. Disaster struck in February 2007, whilst he was training for the Mohegan Sun Super Series. He was deadlifting and he tore his biceps. Reportedly, he said that it did not hurt. He went on to say "No, there are no nerves in there, it didn’t hurt. I just heard it snap and I was just aware of it. You can feel it come up, but there’s no pain." Although the biceps was repaired Thompson has reported that it feels different and that "it’s just not quite as smooth." Although he has said that he does not think it will ever be the same, he has also said that: "When I get to a competition, I won’t be holding back because of my arm. I’ve already won Britain’s Strongest Man - you don’t want to go down - you’ve got to try and win Britain’s Strongest Man again or it’s pointless. So I’ve got to win it really. That’ll be how I judge where I go from there - if I win it or not. Second place isn’t something I’ll be chuffed with." Thompson trained intensively with training partner Scott Reid, the 2007 Britain's Strongest Man in the 105 kg weight class. He went on to qualify for the finals of Britain's Strongest Man in 2008 and won his heat in the process. However, the injury was too proximate for him to fully challenge for the title in a field that was widely reported to have been one of the strongest ever.

Thompson had been closely associated with IFSA in the past but states that he always did what he wanted to do. Prior to the BSM 2008 he stated that "If I don’t qualify for Britain’s Strongest Man I may well end up doing the IFSA World Championships.".

As well as Thompson's successful British Finals, he also won the South England Strongest Man Championship three times (2003, 2004 and 2006) and Sussex Strongest Man on three consecutive occasions from 2003 to 2005. He has also competed in a number of Grand Prix events in Dubai, Latvia, Hungary.

== Mixed martial arts career ==
Oli Thompson made his mixed martial arts debut on 3 February 2009, defeating Ashley Pollard by a second round arm triangle choke. He has continued to fight since then, On 26 March 2011, after amassing a record of 7–2, with his only losses coming to future UFC Heavyweight Rob Broughton and former UFC fighter Joe Vedepo, Thompson took on defending UCMMA champion Ben Smith at UCMMA 19. Thompson won via second round rear naked choke, becoming the new UCMMA Heavyweight Champion. He then defended his title at UCMMA 21 - Stand Your Ground against boxer-turned mixed martial artist Mark Potter, again winning by rear naked choke, this time in the first round.

=== Ultimate Fighting Championship ===
Thompson signed with the Ultimate Fighting Championship and was expected to make his debut against Philip De Fries at UFC 138. However, Thompson was forced out of the bout with an injury and replaced by Rob Broughton.

Thompson made his official debut against UFC newcomer Shawn Jordan at UFC on FX 2. He lost the fight via TKO in the second round after a back-and-forth fight.

Thompson next fought Phil De Fries at UFC on FOX 4, in his second UFC outing. He lost via submission in the second round and was subsequently released from the promotion.

=== BAMMA ===
Thompson headlined BAMMA 15 against Albanian Heavyweight Gzim Selmani. Thompson lost the fight via technical submission (guillotine choke).

=== Inoki Genome Federation ===
Thompson entered the Inoki Genome Federation (IGF) World Grand Prix for the vacant IGF Championship and fought in the Quarterfinal against Japanese legend Ikuhisa Minowa whom he defeated by Unanimous Decision at Inoki Genome Fight 3. Thompson next fought Chris Barnett in the Grand Prix semifinal at Inoki Genome Fight 4 to advance to the Championship match. Oli Thompson defeated Fernando Rodrigues, Jr by TKO in the first round to capture the 2015 IGF World GP and the IGF Championship.

=== Bellator MMA ===
In June 2016, it was announced that Thompson had signed with Bellator MMA. He made his promotional debut against Matt Mitrione on 16 July 2016 at Bellator 158. Thompson lost the back-and-forth fight via TKO in the second round.

In his second fight for the promotion, Thompson faced former training partner Cheick Kongo at Bellator 172 on 18 February 2017. He lost the fight by unanimous decision.

=== Post Bellator ===
After going 4-2 fighting around the world, Thompson faced Sergei Kharitonov at MFP Parus Fight Championship on November 7, 2020. He lost the fight via first-round knockout.

After losing two bouts on the Croatian regional scene, Thompson faced Adam Wieczorek on September 24, 2022 at MMA Attack 4, losing via TKO stoppage in the third round.

Thompson faced Aleksei Oleinik at REN TV Fight Club: Oleinik vs. Thompson on May 26, 2023, and won via knock out in the first round.

Thompson faced Josh Barnett at GCW Bloodsport London at the Electric Ballroom on September 28, 2025, losing by way of submission after just under 11 minutes.

== Championships and accomplishments ==
- Ultimate Challenge MMA
  - UCMMA Heavyweight Championship (one time)
- Inoki Genome Federation
  - IGF Championship (one time, last)
  - 2015 IGF World Grand Prix Championship
- Road FC
  - Road FC Heavyweight Championship (one time)
- ZT Fight Night
  - ZT Fight Night Heavyweight tournament finalist
- Fight Exclusive Night
  - FEN Heavyweight Championship (one time)

== Mixed martial arts record ==
Professional record breakdown
42 matches	23 wins	19 losses
By knockout	15	11
By submission	4	2
By decision	3	6
By disqualification	1	0

Res.	Record	Opponent	Method	Event	Date	Round	Time	Location	Notes
Loss	23–19	Darko Stošić	TKO (knee and punches)	FNC 27	February 7, 2026	2	1:48	Munich, Germany	
Loss	23–18	Junior Karanta	TKO (retirement)	971 FC 2	June 14, 2025	2	5:00	Dubai, United Arab Emirates	
Loss	23–17	Szymon Kołecki	Decision (unanimous)	Babilon MMA 50	December 7, 2024	3	5:00	Ożarów Mazowiecki, Poland	
Win	23–16	Marcin Sianos	TKO (punches)	Babilon MMA 46	August 9, 2024	2	1:46	Międzyzdroje, Poland	Won the vacant Babilon MMA Heavyweight Championship.
Win	22–16	Aleksei Oleinik	KO (punch)	Ren TV Fight Club Super Series: Oleinik vs. Thompson	26 May 2023	1	2:25	Moscow, Russia	
Loss	21–16	Adam Wieczorek	TKO (punches)	MMA Attack 4	24 September 2022	3	2:13	Będzin, Poland	
Loss	21–15	Ivan Vitasović	KO (head kick)	FNC 6	17 June 2022	2	2:10	Karlovac, Croatia	For the FNC Heavyweight Championship.
Loss	21–14	Saša Milinković	Decision (split)	FNC: Armagedon 2 Finals	4 December 2021	3	5:00	Osijek, Croatia	
Loss	21–13	Sergei Kharitonov	KO (punch)	Modern Fighting Pankration: Parus FC 1	7 November 2020	1	2:50	Dubai, United Arab Emirates	For the Parus FC Heavyweight Championship.
Win	21–12	Szymon Bajor	KO (punch)	Fight Exclusive Night 28	13 June 2020	1	0:23	Lublin, Poland	Won the inaugural FEN Heavyweight Championship. Knockout of the Night.
Loss	20–12	Ante Delija	TKO (punches)	KSW 51	9 November 2019	2	1:58	Zagreb, Croatia	
Win	20–11	Kamil Bazelak	KO (knee and punch)	Sparta Fight Series 4	7 September 2019	1	N/A	Eastbourne, England	
Loss	19–11	Tarek Suleiman	TKO (punches)	UAE Warriors 6	3 May 2019	2	4:42	Abu Dhabi, United Arab Emirates	For the inaugural UAE Warriors Light Heavyweight Championship.
Win	19–10	Roman Wehbe	TKO (knees to the body)	Abu Dhabi Warriors 5	26 January 2019	2	3:54	Abu Dhabi, United Arab Emirates	
Win	18–10	Deng Xiaolong	TKO (submission to knee to the body)	Road FC 047	12 May 2018	2	3:49	Beijing, China	2018 Road FC Openweight Grand Prix Quarterfinal.
Loss	17–10	Cheick Kongo	Decision (unanimous)	Bellator 172	18 February 2017	3	5:00	San Jose, California, United States	
Loss	17–9	Matt Mitrione	TKO (punches)	Bellator 158	16 July 2016	2	4:21	London, England	
Win	17–8	Fernando Rodrigues Jr.	TKO (punches)	Inoki Bom-Ba-Ye 2015	31 December 2015	1	2:08	Tokyo, Japan	Won the 2015 IGF Openweight World Grand Prix and the IGF Championship.
Win	16–8	Michal Wlodarek	DQ (illegal knee)	KSW 32	31 October 2015	3	1:42	London, England	
Win	15–8	Chris Barnett	Decision (unanimous)	Inoki Genome Fight 4	29 August 2015	2	5:00	Tokyo, Japan	2015 IGF Openweight World Grand Prix Semifinal.
Win	14–8	Kamil Bazelak	TKO (knee)	Macto Championships 1	27 June 2015	1	3:06	Milton Keynes, England	Return to Heavyweight.
Win	13–8	Ikuhisa Minowa	Decision (unanimous)	Inoki Genome Fight 3	11 April 2015	2	5:00	Tokyo, Japan	2015 IGF Openweight World Grand Prix Quarterfinal.
Loss	12–8	Brett McDermott	KO (punches)	BAMMA 17	6 December 2014	1	1:43	Manchester, England	Light Heavyweight debut.
Loss	12–7	Mariusz Pudzianowski	Decision (unanimous)	KSW 27	17 May 2014	2	5:00	Gdańsk, Poland	
Loss	12–6	Gzim Selmani	Technical Submission (guillotine choke)	BAMMA 15	5 April 2014	1	0:18	London, England	
Win	12–5	Kamil Walus	TKO (punches)	KSW 25	7 December 2013	2	1:34	Wrocław, Poland	
Win	11–5	Kevin Asplund	TKO (punches)	Global Warrior Challenge: The British Invasion	29 June 2013	1	3:21	Kansas City, Missouri, United States	
Loss	10–5	Karol Bedorf	Decision (unanimous)	KSW 22	16 March 2013	3	5:00	Warsaw, Poland	Catchweight (254 lb) bout.
Win	10–4	Ivan Pioneer	TKO (submission to punches)	Colosseum Sports MMA: Ultimate Conflict 3	10 November 2012	1	0:45	Guildford, England	
Loss	9–4	Phil De Fries	Submission (rear-naked choke)	UFC on Fox: Shogun vs. Vera	4 August 2012	2	4:16	Los Angeles, California, United States	
Loss	9–3	Shawn Jordan	TKO (punches)	UFC on FX: Alves vs. Kampmann	3 March 2012	2	1:07	Sydney, Australia	
Win	9–2	Mark Potter	Submission (rear-naked choke)	Ultimate Challenge MMA 21	25 June 2011	1	2:55	London, England	Defended the UCMMA Heavyweight Championship.
Win	8–2	Ben Smith	Submission (rear-naked choke)	Ultimate Challenge MMA 19	26 March 2011	2	3:44	London, England	Won the UCMMA Heavyweight Championship.
Win	7–2	Nikki Kent	TKO (punches)	ZT Fight Night: Enter the Octagon	3 December 2010	1	N/A	Hove, England	
Win	6–2	Tomasz Czerwinski	Submission (rear-naked choke)	ZT Fight Night: Stand Your Ground	31 July 2010	1	N/A	Eastbourne, England	
Win	5–2	Ian Hawkins	Decision (unanimous)	Ultimate Challenge MMA 13	20 June 2010	3	5:00	London, England	
Loss	4–2	Rob Broughton	Decision (unanimous)	ZT Fight Night: Heavyweights Collide	30 January 2010	3	5:00	Hove, England	ZTFN Heavyweight Tournament Final.
Loss	4–1	Joe Vedepo	TKO (punches)	ZT Fight Night: Heavyweights Collide	30 January 2010	2	1:24	Hove, England	ZTFN Heavyweight Tournament Semifinal.
Win	4–0	Steve Day	KO (punch)	ZT Fight Night: Heavyweights Collide	30 January 2010	1	1:07	Hove, England	ZTFN Heavyweight Tournament Quarterfinal.
Win	3–0	Tomasz Kamienczyk	TKO (punches)	ZT Fight Night: Night of Champions	21 August 2009	1	N/A	Hove, England	
Win	2–0	Ashley Pollard	TKO (submission to punches)	ZT Fight Night 16	19 June 2009	1	2:19	Hove, England	
Win	1–0	Ashley Pollard	Submission (arm-triangle choke)	ZT Fight Night 15	3 April 2009	2	N/A	Hove, England	Heavyweight debut.

== Kickboxing record ==
Professional kickboxing record
1 Win (1 (T)KO), 0 Losses, 0 Draw
Date	Result	Opponent	Event	Location	Method	Round	Time
2026-06-30	Win	(Poland) Ariel Wittek	Strike King 7	Kraków, Poland	KO (punch)	2	2:42

Preceded by Mick Gosling	Britain's Strongest Man; 2006	Succeeded by Terry Hollands
