= 2009 in Ultimate Challenge MMA =

Mixed martial arts events

Information
- First date: February 7, 2009
- Last date: December 5, 2009

Events
- Total events: 8

Fights
- Total fights: 93

Chronology
2008 in Ultimate Challenge MMA	2009 in Ultimate Challenge MMA	2010 in Ultimate Challenge MMA

The year 2009 is the second year in the history of Ultimate Challenge MMA, a mixed martial arts promotion based in the United Kingdom. In 2009 Ultimate Challenge MMA held 8 events beginning with, UCMMA 2: Unbreakable.

== Events list ==
#	Event	Date	Venue	Location
9	UCMMA 9: Fighting for Heroes	December 5, 2009	The Troxy	London, England, United Kingdom
8	UCMMA 8: Dynamite	October 24, 2009	The Troxy	London, England, United Kingdom
7	UCMMA 7: Mayhem	September 19, 2009	The Troxy	London, England, United Kingdom
6	UCMMA 6: Payback	August 22, 2009	The Troxy	London, England, United Kingdom
5	UCMMA 5: Heat	July 11, 2009	The Troxy	London, England, United Kingdom
4	UCMMA 4: Relentless	May 9, 2009	The Troxy	London, England, United Kingdom
3	UCMMA 3: Unstoppable	March 28, 2009	The Troxy	London, England, United Kingdom
2	UCMMA 2: Unbreakable	February 7, 2009	The Troxy	London, England, United Kingdom

== UCMMA 2: Unbreakable ==
UCMMA 2: Unbreakable was an event held on February 7, 2009 at The Troxy in London, England, United Kingdom.

=== Results ===
Main Card
Weight class				Method	Round	Time	Notes
	Mohamed Khacha	def.	Mark Weir	TKO (Punches)	1	4:26
	Dyson Roberts	def.	Scott Rogan	TKO (Punches)	1	1:46
	Jimi Manuwa	def.	Jamie Hearn	Submission (Guillotine Choke)	1	1:49
	Edgelson Lua	def.	Scott Jansen	Submission (Rear-Naked Choke)	2	1:12
	Dan Movahedi	def.	Darren Walsh	Submission (Triangle Choke)	1	2:47
	Saieed Gholamie	def.	Ashley Pollard	TKO (Punches)	3	1:10
	Ben Smith	def.	Tony Starns	Submission (Armbar)	1	4:57
	Kiril Handzhiyski	def.	Sebastian Iwaniak	TKO (Punches)	1	1:36
	Wesley Johnson	vs.	Scott Pooley	No Contest	1	0:00
	Luke Smith	def.	Dragos Voiculescu	Submission (Rear-Naked Choke)	1	1:37
	John Joe Ellis	def.	Marcus Thomas	TKO (Punches)	1	0:09
	Jamain Watkins	def.	David Ralph	Decision (Unanimous)	3	5:00

== UCMMA 3: Unstoppable ==
UCMMA 3: Unstoppable was an event held on March 28, 2009 at The Troxy in London, England, United Kingdom.

=== Results ===
Main Card
Weight class				Method	Round	Time	Notes
	Brad Pickett	def.	Dino Gambatesa	Submission (Guillotine Choke)	2	0:15
	Edgelson Lua	def.	Dean Bray	Submission (Rear-Naked Choke)	1	1:24
	Jason Young	def.	Jordan Miller	TKO (Corner Stoppage)	2	5:00
	Tony Machado	def.	Chris Greig	KO (Punches)	1	4:11
	Jamie Hearn	def.	Chris Harman	Decision (Unanimous)	3	5:00
	Jake Bostwick	def.	Rafik Benziada	KO (Punches)	1	3:32
	John Kelly	def.	Max Henchy	Submission (Rear-Naked Choke)	1	2:00
	Adam Gould	def.	Dave Urqhuart	KO (Punches)	1	1:21
	Michael Brown	def.	Pablo Ben	TKO (Doctor Stoppage)	1	4:44
	Dominic Plumb	def.	Mark Brown	TKO (Punches)	1	0:22
	Simon Gill	def.	John Joe Ellis	Submission (Armbar)	1	2:27
	Keith Singh	def.	Gary Tyler	Submission (Armbar)	1	4:00
	Mark Adams	def.	Brad Wheeler	Decision (Unanimous)	3	5:00

== UCMMA 4: Relentless ==
UCMMA 4: Relentless was an event held on May 9, 2009 at The Troxy in London, England, United Kingdom.

=== Results ===
Main Card
Weight class				Method	Round	Time	Notes
	Jimi Manuwa	def.	Ryan Robinson	TKO (Punches)	1	2:03
	Jean Silva	def.	A.J. Wenn	Submission (Arm-Triangle Choke)	2	2:17
	Roman Webber	def.	Colin Gough	Submission (Punches)	1	0:38
	Jack Mason	def.	Shahid Hussain	Submission (Rear-Naked Choke)	1	4:46
	Michael Pastou	def.	Jamaine Facey	Decision (Unanimous)	3	5:00
	Brad Wheeler	def.	Wesley Murch	Submission (Triangle Choke)	1	4:28
	Tam Khan	def.	Billy Mahoney	TKO (Retirement)	2	1:23
	Abdullah Abou Hamdan	def.	Danny Cornwall	KO (Punches)	1	1:20
	Harry Shoebridge	def.	Michael Sidwell	TKO (Punches)	2	3:35
	Ben Craggy	def.	Tommy Kelly	Submission (Punches)	1	2:14
	Scott Rogan	def.	Paul Hartley	Decision (Majority)	3	5:00
	Kevin Porter	def.	Chris Woolcott	KO (Punches)	1	0:11
	Dai Smith	def.	Spencer Morley	KO (Punches)	1	0:13
	Michael Brown	def.	Paul Phipps	Submission (Punches)	1	1:58

== UCMMA 5: Heat ==
UCMMA 5: Heat was an event held on July 11, 2009 at The Troxy in London, England, United Kingdom.

=== Results ===
Main Card
Weight class				Method	Round	Time	Notes
	Dino Gambatesa	def.	Brad Wheeler	TKO (Punches)	1	0:40
	Jack Mason	def.	Dorlan O'Malley	Submission (Triangle Choke)	1	0:00
	Jamaine Facey	def.	Nigel Whitear	TKO (Punches)	1	0:38
	Dyson Roberts	def.	Michael Brown	TKO (Punches)	2	0:00
	Giorgio Andrews	def.	Max Henchy	Submission (Rear-Naked Choke)	1	0:00
	Chris Greig	def.	Shaun Lomas	Submission (Heel Hook)	2	0:00
	Rafik Benziada	def.	Earl Brown	TKO (Punches)	1	0:00
	Wesley Johnson	def.	Alex Harvey	Submission (Triangle Choke)	1	0:00
	Luke Smith	def.	John Joe Ellis	Submission (Triangle Choke)	2	0:00
	Dominic Plumb	def.	Jody Cottham	Submission (Rear-Naked Choke)	1	0:00
	Brett Bassett	def.	Adam Avo	Submission (Rear-Naked Choke)	1	0:00

== UCMMA 6: Payback ==
UCMMA 6: Payback was an event held on August 22, 2009 at The Troxy in London, England, United Kingdom.

=== Results ===
Main Card
Weight class				Method	Round	Time	Notes
	Jimi Manuwa	def.	Luke Blythe	KO (Punch)	2	4:22
	Brad Pickett	def.	David Lee	Submission (Guillotine Choke)	1	2:26
	Shaun Lomas	def.	Jamie Hearn	Submission (Guillotine Choke)	1	3:42
	Paul Reed	def.	Brad Wheeler	Decision (Unanimous)	3	5:00
	Wesley Johnson	def.	Danny Fletcher	Submission (Triangle Choke)	1	1:02
	Ashley Pollard	def.	Ian Hawkings	TKO (Punches)	1	3:10
	Lee Doski	def.	Jamaine Facey	Submission (Rear-Naked Choke)	1	4:09
	Jack Magee	def.	Richard Griffin	Submission (Triangle Choke)	1	1:02
	John Kelly	def.	Alex Harvey	TKO (Punches)	2	2:59
	Radoslaw Piechnik	def.	Roy Allison Jr.	TKO (Punches)	1	2:24

== UCMMA 7: Mayhem ==
UCMMA 7: Mayhem was an event held on September 19, 2009 at The Troxy in London, England, United Kingdom.

=== Results ===
Main Card
Weight class				Method	Round	Time	Notes
	Ben Smith	def.	Amokrane Sabet	Submission (Arm-Triangle Choke)	1	3:09
	Francis Heagney	def.	Tim Radcliffe	Submission (Guillotine Choke)	2	3:12
	Mike Edwards	def.	Jamie Hearn	Submission (Punches)	1	2:13
	Wesley Murch	def.	Mark Smith	Submission (Kimura)	1	4:55
	Jake Bostwick	def.	Chris Harman	Submission (Rear-Naked Choke)	3	2:54
	Colin French	def.	Liam Etebar	TKO (Punches)	1	2:36
	John Kelly	def.	Keith Singh	Submission (Rear-Naked Choke)	2	5:00
	Dan Movahedi	def.	Michael Sidwell	TKO (Punches)	1	1:37
	Shane Omer	def.	Marcus Thomas	Submission (Kimura)	1	2:24
	Mark Adams	def.	Simon Gill	Submission (Guillotine Choke)	2	1:51
	Jim O'Keefe	def.	Danny Beevor	TKO (Punches)	1	2:54

== UCMMA 8: Dynamite ==
UCMMA 8: Dynamite was an event held on October 24, 2009 at The Troxy in London, England, United Kingdom.

=== Results ===
Main Card
Weight class				Method	Round	Time	Notes
	Neil Grove	def.	Martin Thompson	TKO (Punches)	1	0:53
	Tom Watson	def.	Denniston Sutherland	Decision (Split)	3	5:00
	Alberto Mina	def.	Edgelson Lua	Submission (Armbar)	1	3:26
	Dean Amasinger	def.	Scott Jansen	Submission (Arm-Triangle Choke)	1	0:44
	Jason Young	def.	Abdul Mohamed	Decision (Majority)	3	5:00
	Lee Doski	def.	Jamaine Facey	Submission (Rear-Naked Choke)	2	2:04
	Wayne Weaver	def.	David Nobel	TKO (Doctor Stoppage)	1	5:00
	Tam Khan	def.	Ben Craggy	Submission (Rear-Naked Choke)	1	1:20
	Michael Brown	def.	Scott Rogan	Decision (Split)	3	5:00
	Joe Holder	def.	Ryan Campbell	Submission (Triangle Choke)	1	3:38
	Abdullah Abou Hamdan	def.	Shahid Hussain	Technical Decision (Unanimous)	1	5:00
	Pablo Ben	def.	Tommy Kelly	Submission (Punches)	2	3:36

== UCMMA 9: Fighting for Heroes ==
UCMMA 9: Fighting for Heroes was an event held on December 5, 2009 at The Troxy in London, England, United Kingdom.

=== Results ===
Main Card
Weight class				Method	Round	Time	Notes
	Jimi Manuwa	def.	Shaun Lomas	TKO (Punches)	1	3:58
	Jamie Hearn	def.	Tam Khan	KO (Punch)	1	1:39
	Michael Pastou	def.	Mark Glover	Decision (Unanimous)	3	5:00
	Ben Smith	def.	Wayne Weaver	Submission (Rear-Naked Choke)	2	3:17
	Luke Smith	def.	Wesley Johnson	TKO (Punches)	1	4:09
	Earl Brown	def.	Karl Lawrence	Submission (Guillotine Choke)	2	4:59
	Dyson Roberts	def.	Brett Bassett	Submission (Punches)	1	2:59
	Mike Edwards	def.	Jake Bostwick	Submission (Rear-Naked Choke)	1	1:40
	Simon Gill	def.	John Kelly	Decision (Split)	3	5:00
	Joe Holder	vs.	Michael Brown	No Contest (Holder Cut by Cage)	1	0:27

== See also ==
- Ultimate Challenge MMA
