= 2010 in Ultimate Challenge MMA =

Mixed martial arts events

Information
- First date: February 6, 2010
- Last date: December 3, 2010

Events
- Total events: 8

Fights
- Title fights: 95

Chronology
2009 in Ultimate Challenge MMA	2010 in Ultimate Challenge MMA	2011 in Ultimate Challenge MMA

The year 2010 is the third year in the history of Ultimate Challenge MMA, a mixed martial arts promotion based in the United Kingdom. In 2010 Ultimate Challenge MMA held 8 events beginning with, CMMA 10: Resurrection.

== Events list ==
#	Event	Date	Venue	Location
17	UCMMA 17: Kings of the Cage	December 3, 2010	The Troxy	London, England, United Kingdom
16	UCMMA 16: Unbelievable	October 22, 2010	The Troxy	London, England, United Kingdom
15	UCMMA 15: Showdown	September 18, 2010	The Troxy	London, England, United Kingdom
14	UCMMA 14: Invincible	August 7, 2010	The Troxy	London, England, United Kingdom
13	UCMMA 13: Feel the Pain	July 20, 2010	The Troxy	London, England, United Kingdom
12	UCMMA 12: Never Back Down	June 8, 2010	The Troxy	London, England, United Kingdom
11	UCMMA 11: Adrenaline Rush	March 27, 2010	The Troxy	London, England, United Kingdom
10	UCMMA 10: Resurrection	February 6, 2010	The Troxy	London, England, United Kingdom

== UCMMA 10: Resurrection ==
UCMMA 10: Resurrection was an event held on February 6, 2010, at the Troxy in London, England, United Kingdom.

=== Results ===
Main Card
Weight class				Method	Round	Time	Notes
	Alberto Mina	def.	Dean Amasinger	TKO (Punches)	3	2:17
	Stav Economou	def.	Shola Adeniran	Submission (Rear-Naked Choke)	1	1:13
	John Maguire	def.	Edgelson Lua	Decision (Split)	3	5:00
	Karlos Vemola	def.	Peter Yendall	KO (Punches)	1	0:49
	Scott Jansen	def.	Azran Quasid	Submission (Kimura)	1	4:44
	Jamaine Facey	def.	Ben Craggy	KO (Punch)	1	0:35
	David Nobel	def.	Rafik Benziada	Decision (Unanimous)	3	5:00
	Colin French	def.	Pablo Ben	Submission (Triangle Choke)	1	1:49
	Chris Greig	def.	Steve Dossett	Submission (Guillotine Choke)	1	2:51
	Dan Movahedi	def.	Ryan Campbell	TKO (Punches)	1	1:16
	Bola Omoyele	def.	Earl Brown	TKO (Knee and Punches)	2	2:16
	Brad Wheeler	def.	Dominic Plumb	Submission (Armbar)	1	0:31
	Richard Griffin	def.	Chris Woolcott	Submission (Rear-Naked Choke)	2	3:17
	Jerome Carol	def.	Galore Bofando	DQ (Illegal Knee)	2	1:27

== UCMMA 11: Adrenaline Rush ==
UCMMA 11: Adrenaline Rush was an event held on March 27, 2010, at the Troxy in London, England, United Kingdom.

=== Results ===
Main Card
Weight class				Method	Round	Time	Notes
	Mark Weir	def.	Jack Mason	TKO (Punches)	2	0:00
	Michael Pastou	def.	Francis Heagney	Decision (Unanimous)	3	5:00
	David Lee	def.	James Saville	Submission (Triangle Choke)	1	0:00
	Ben Smith	def.	Jamie Hearn	TKO (Shoulder Injury)	1	0:00
	Jake Bostwick	def.	Denniston Sutherland	Decision (Split)	3	5:00
	Ian Hawkings	def.	Shola Adeniran	KO (Punch)	1	0:16
	Marvin Eghan	def.	Jack Dennis	TKO (Punches)	1	2:54
	Wesley Johnson	def.	Simon Carington	Submission (Guillotine Choke)	1	0:00
	Billy Mahoney	def.	Earl Brown	Decision (Majority)	3	0:00
	John Kelly	def.	Roy Allison Jr.	TKO (Punches)	1	0:00
	Reza Mahdavian	def.	Michael Brown	TKO (Punches)	1	0:00
	Nick Lloyd	def.	Kai Senken	Decision (Majority)	3	5:00
	Afakasi Sione	def.	Dave Morton	KO (Punch)	1	0:00

== UCMMA 12: Never Back Down ==
UCMMA 12: Never Back Down was an event held on June 8, 2010, at the Troxy in London, England, United Kingdom.

=== Results ===
Main Card
Weight class				Method	Round	Time	Notes
	Neil Grove	vs.	Stav Economou	Draw	3	5:00
	Jimi Manuwa	def.	Reza Mahdavian	TKO (Punches)	1	3:19
	Paul Cahoon	def.	Earl Brown	TKO (Eye Injury)	2	5:00
	Djo Lema	def.	Scott Jansen	Submission (Armbar)	1	3:05
	Jamaine Facey	def.	Dyson Roberts	Submission (Rear-Naked Choke)	2	2:37
	Lee Wieczorek	def.	Dean Bray	Submission (North-South Choke)	1	2:52
	Colin French	def.	Jody Cottham	TKO (Punches)	1	3:51
	Andy Gooch	def.	Michael Brown	TKO (Punches)	1	4:47
	Luke Newman	def.	Carl Kinslow	TKO (Punches)	1	2:09
	Tom Dixon	def.	Daniel Shortman	Submission (Triangle Choke)	1	2:38

== UCMMA 13: Feel the Pain ==
UCMMA 13: Feel the Pain was an event held on July 20, 2010, at the Troxy in London, England, United Kingdom.

=== Results ===
Main Card
Weight class				Method	Round	Time	Notes
	Ben Smith	def.	Darren Towler	Submission (Rear-Naked Choke)	1	2:59
	Jack Mason	def.	Chris Greig	Submission (Guillotine Choke)	2	0:00
	Tim Radcliffe	def.	Jason Ball	Decision (Unanimous)	3	5:00
	Oli Thompson	def.	Ian Hawkings	Decision (Unanimous)	3	5:00
	Harry Shoebridge	def.	Kai Senken	Submission (Punches)	2	2:08
	Ben Craggy	def.	Earl Brown	KO (Punch)	1	0:00
	Warren de Reuck	def.	Simon Carington	TKO (Punches)	1	0:30
	Chris Woolcott	def.	Ryan Campbell	Submission (Rear-Naked Choke)	1	4:21
	Galore Bofando	def.	Marcus Artry	Decision (Unanimous)	3	5:00
	Chris Grubb	def.	Afakasi Sione	Decision (Unanimous)	3	5:00

== UCMMA 14: Invincible ==
UCMMA 14: Invincible was an event held on August 7, 2010, at the Troxy in London, England, United Kingdom.

=== Results ===
Main Card
Weight class				Method	Round	Time	Notes
	Jimi Manuwa	def.	Valentino Petrescu	KO (Punch)	1	3:08
	Jamaine Facey	def.	Edgelson Lua	TKO (Punches)	2	4:57
	Francis Heagney	def.	Brad Wheeler	TKO (Punches)	1	4:48
	John Kelly	def.	Tom Dixon	KO (Punch)	2	1:14
	Jake Bostwick	def.	Earl Brown	KO (Punch)	2	1:27
	Ian Hawkings	def.	Mark Potter	DQ (Soccer Kick)	1	1:12
	Giorgio Andrews	def.	Spe McMorris	Submission (Rear-Naked Choke)	1	3:07
	Ben Craggy	def.	Dan Movahedi	TKO (Punches)	1	3:16
	Joe Holder	def.	Michael Brown	TKO (Punches)	1	2:47
	Dean Bray	def.	Simon Gould	Submission (Guillotine Choke)	2	1:36
	Steve O'Keefe	def.	Alex Harvey	TKO (Punches)	1	1:48
	Tom Dixon	def.	Daniel Shortman	Submission (Triangle Choke)	1	1:20

== UCMMA 15: Showdown ==
UCMMA 15: Showdown was an event held on September 18, 2010, at the Troxy in London, England, United Kingdom.

=== Results ===
Main Card
Weight class				Method	Round	Time	Notes
	Ben Smith	def.	Amokrane Sabet	Submission (Rear-Naked Choke)	1	3:13
	Michael Pastou	vs.	Robbie Olivier	No Contest (Fan Riot)	2	5:00
	John Maguire	def.	Henrique Santana	TKO (Doctor Stoppage)	2	1:25
	Jack Mason	def.	Lola Bamgbala	KO (Punch)	1	2:37
	Nick Chapman	def.	Andrius Juska	Submission (Arm-Triangle Choke)	1	1:14
	Jason Barrett	def.	Mark Carling	KO (Punch)	1	2:18
	Bola Omoyele	def.	Michael Brown	TKO (Punches)	1	1:21
	Karl Lawrence	def.	Steve Dossett	Decision (Unanimous)	3	5:00
	Lee Doski	def.	Kenny Moyston	TKO (Punches)	2	1:23
	Kiril Handzhiyski	def.	Adrian Preda	Submission (Rear-Naked Choke)	1	4:47
	Joel Reid	def.	Michael Sidwell	Submission (Rear-Naked Choke)	1	2:17
	Warren de Reuck	def.	Richard Walker	TKO (Punches)	1	3:21
	Ryan Campbell	def.	Colin Wilby	Submission (Rear-Naked Choke)	1	2:20

== UCMMA 16: Unbelievable ==
UCMMA 16: Unbelievable was an event held on October 22, 2010, at the Troxy in London, England, United Kingdom.

=== Results ===
Main Card
Weight class				Method	Round	Time	Notes
	Dean Amasinger	def.	Jamaine Facey	Decision (Unanimous)	3	5:00
	Linton Vassell	vs.	Adrian Preda	No Contest (Accidental Eye Poke)	1	0:00
	Cory Tait	def.	Dino Gambatesa	KO (Front Kick)	2	0:10
	Khalid Ismail	def.	Tommy Kelly	TKO (Punches)	1	1:25
	Galore Bofando	def.	Carl Kinslow	KO (Knee)	2	0:00
	Dominic Plumb	def.	Peter Waterhouse	TKO (Punches)	2	0:00
	Huseyin Garabet	def.	Khalid Raja	Submission (Anaconda Choke)	3	0:00
	Kevin Salisbury	def.	Wayne Brown	Submission (Armbar)	1	0:00
	Alex Harvey	def.	Daniel Shortman	Submission (Achilles Lock)	1	2:28
	Charlie Baldwin	def.	Steven Sidwell	TKO (Punches)	1	0:00

== UCMMA 17: Kings of the Cage ==
UCMMA 17: Kings of the Cage was an event held on December 3, 2010, at the Troxy in London, England, United Kingdom.

=== Results ===
Main Card
Weight class				Method	Round	Time	Notes
	Ben Smith	def.	Irving Daniels	Submission (Punches)	2	4:24
	Nick Chapman	def.	David Zetolofsky	Submission (Arm-Triangle Choke)	2	2:57
	Mark Potter	def.	Tomasz Czerwinski	TKO (Punches)	1	0:21
	Brad Wheeler	def.	Djo Lema	Submission (Triangle Choke)	2	4:05
	David Lee	def.	John Kelly	Technical Submission (Rear-Naked Choke)	1	2:12
	James Lutman	def.	Cory Tait	Decision (Unanimous)	3	5:00
	Michelle Tyler	def.	Vicki Watts	TKO (Punch)	3	3:02
	Joe Holder	def.	Afakasi Sione	Submission (Triangle Choke)	2	0:00
	Warren de Reuck	def.	Charlie Leary	TKO (Punches)	3	0:00
	Karl Lawrence	def.	Tony Carney	TKO (Punches)	1	0:00
	Joel Reid	def.	Moses Santos	Decision (Unanimous)	3	5:00
	Wendle Lewis	def.	Amil Smith	KO (Punch)	2	3:48
	Mike Wood	def.	Tom Dixon	Decision (Unanimous)	3	5:00

== See also ==
- Ultimate Challenge MMA
