= UFC on Fuel TV: Gustafsson vs. Silva =

UFC mixed martial arts event in 2012

- The poster for UFC on Fuel TV: Gustafsson vs. Silva
- Promotion: Ultimate Fighting Championship
- Date: April 14, 2012
- Venue: Ericsson Globe Arena
- City: Stockholm, Sweden
- Attendance: 15,428
- Total gate: $2,230,000

Event chronology
UFC on FX: Alves vs. Kampmann	UFC on Fuel TV: Gustafsson vs. Silva	UFC 145: Jones vs. Evans

UFC on Fuel TV: Gustafsson vs. Silva (also known as UFC on Fuel TV 2 or UFC: Sweden) was a mixed martial arts event held by the Ultimate Fighting Championship on April 14, 2012, at the Ericsson Globe Arena in Stockholm, Sweden.

== Background ==
This was the first UFC event held in Sweden, and was the fastest selling European event in UFC history, selling out in three hours.

The preliminary card for this event streamed live on Facebook.

A rematch between Ross Pearson and Dennis Siver at featherweight was briefly linked to this event. However, Siver instead faced Diego Nunes.

Mike Goldberg did play by play for this event in place of Jon Anik due to scheduling issues.

Akira Corassani was expected to face Jason Young at the event, but Corassani pulled out of the bout with an undisclosed injury and was replaced by Eric Wisely.

Antônio Rogério Nogueira was expected to face Alexander Gustafsson at this event but pulled out due to injury. His replacement was Thiago Silva.

Jorgen Kruth was expected to face Cyrille Diabate at the event but pulled out of the bout with an injury, Tom DeBlass stepped in for Kruth and fought Diabate.

== Results ==
Main Card
Weight class				Method	Round	Time	Notes
Light Heavyweight	Alexander Gustafsson	def.	Thiago Silva	Decision (unanimous) (30–27, 30–27, 29–28)	3	5:00
Middleweight	Brian Stann	def.	Alessio Sakara	KO (punches)	1	2:26
Welterweight	Siyar Bahadurzada	def.	Paulo Thiago	KO (punch)	1	0:42
Featherweight	Dennis Siver	def.	Diego Nunes	Decision (unanimous) (29–28, 29–28, 29–28)	3	5:00
Welterweight	John Maguire	def.	DaMarques Johnson	Submission (armbar)	2	4:40
Bantamweight	Brad Pickett	def.	Damacio Page	Submission (rear-naked choke)	2	4:05
Preliminary card (Facebook)
Welterweight	James Head	def.	Papy Abedi	Submission (rear-naked choke)	1	4:33	(Note: This bout aired on the broadcast following the Stann vs Sakara bout.)
Light Heavyweight	Cyrille Diabate	def.	Tom DeBlass	Decision (majority) (29–28, 29–28, 28–28)	3	5:00
Middleweight	Francis Carmont	def.	Magnus Cedenblad	Submission (rear-naked choke)	2	1:42
Lightweight	Reza Madadi	def.	Yoislandy Izquierdo	Submission (guillotine choke)	2	1:28
Welterweight	Simeon Thoresen	def.	Besam Yousef	Submission (rear-naked choke)	2	2:36
Featherweight	Jason Young	def.	Eric Wisely	Decision (unanimous) (30–28, 29–28, 29–28)	3	5:00

== Bonus awards ==
The following fighters received $50,000 bonuses.

- Fight of the Night: Brad Pickett vs. Damacio Page
- Knockout of the Night: Siyar Bahadurzada
- Submission of the Night: John Maguire

== See also ==
- List of UFC events
- 2012 in UFC
