= 2008 in Ultimate Challenge MMA =

Mixed martial arts events

Information
- First date: 6 December 2008
- Last date: 6 December 2008

Events
- Total events: 1

Fights
- Total fights: 11

Chronology
2008 in Ultimate Challenge MMA	2009 in Ultimate Challenge MMA

The year 2008 is the first year in the history of Ultimate Challenge MMA, a mixed martial arts promotion based in the United Kingdom. In 2008 Ultimate Challenge MMA held 1 event, UCMMA 1: Bad Breed.

== Events list ==
#	Event	Date	Venue	Location
1	UCMMA 1: Bad Breed	6 December 2008	The Troxy	London, England, United Kingdom

== UCMMA 1: Bad Breed ==
UCMMA 1: Bad Breed was an event held on 6 December 2008 at The Troxy in London, England, United Kingdom.

=== Results ===
Main Card
Weight class				Method	Round	Time	Notes
	Mark Smith	def.	Jody Cottham	Submission (Armbar)	1	1:05
	Fabio Santana Toldo	def.	Edgelson Lua	Submission (Heel Hook)	1	3:26
	Marvin Arnold-bleau	def.	Jake bostwick	TKO (Punches)	1	0:32
	Tim Radcliffe	def.	Jason Young	Submission (Rear-Naked Choke)	1	3:03
	Tom Watson	def.	Daniel Cubitt	TKO (Punches)	1	1:57
	Chris Harman	def.	Robert Salmon	KO (Punch)	2	0:23
	Neil Grove	def.	James McSweeney	TKO (Punches)	2	1:38
	Dillian Whyte	def.	Mark Stroud	KO (Punch)	1	0:12
	Michael Pastou	def.	Chris Woolcott	Submission (Keylock)	1	1:15
	Jimi Manuwa	def.	Chris Greig	TKO (Punches)	2	1:35
	Jack Mason	def.	James Elson	Submission (Guillotine Choke)	1	1:05

== See also ==
- Ultimate Challenge MMA
