= 2011 in Ultimate Challenge MMA =

Mixed martial arts events

Information
- First date: February 5, 2011
- Last date: December 3, 2011

Events
- Total events: 11

Fights
- Total fights: 95

Chronology
2010 in Ultimate Challenge MMA	2011 in Ultimate Challenge MMA	2012 in Ultimate Challenge MMA

The year 2011 is the fourth year in the history of Ultimate Challenge MMA, a mixed martial arts promotion based in the United Kingdom. In 2011 Ultimate Challenge MMA held 11 events beginning with, UCMMA 18 - Face Off.

== Events list ==
#	Event	Date	Venue	Location
28	UCMMA 25: The Beat Down	December 3, 2011	The Troxy	London, England, United Kingdom
27	White Collar MMA 2	November 12, 2011	The Troxy	London, England, United Kingdom
26	UCMMA: Contenders	November 6, 2011		Brighton, East Sussex, England
25	UCMMA: Dominican Republic	November 6, 2011	Hard Rock Casino	Punta Cana, Dominican Republic
24	UCMMA 24: Hands of War	October 22, 2011	The Troxy	London, England, United Kingdom
23	UCMMA 23: Go 4 It	September 17, 2011	The Troxy	London, England, United Kingdom
22	UCMMA 22: Warrior Creed	August 6, 2011	The Troxy	London, England, United Kingdom
21	UCMMA 21: Stand Your Ground	June 25, 2011	The Troxy	London, England, United Kingdom
20	UCMMA 20: Fists of Fire	May 14, 2011	The Troxy	London, England, United Kingdom
19	UCMMA 19: Lights Out	March 26, 2011	The Troxy	London, England, United Kingdom
18	UCMMA 18: Face Off	February 5, 2011	The Troxy	London, England, United Kingdom

== UCMMA 18: Face Off ==
UCMMA 18: Face Off was an event held on February 5, 2011, at The Troxy in London, England, United Kingdom.

=== Results ===
Main Card
Weight class				Method	Round	Time	Notes
	John Maguire	def.	Dean Amasinger	Submission (Rear-Naked Choke)	2	3:28
	Tim Radcliffe	def.	Michael Pastou	KO (Head Kick)	1	4:29
	Linton Vassell	def.	Rolandas Cizauskas	TKO (Punches)	1	4:21
	Denniston Sutherland	def.	Jack Mason	Decision (Unanimous)	3	5:00
	Bola Omoyele	def.	Brendan Cookman	TKO (Punches)	1	2:45
	Luke Newman	def.	Charles Scott	TKO (Punches)	1	4:36
	Wayne Brown	def.	Michael Sidwell	TKO (Doctor Stoppage)	1	5:00
	Dominic Plumb	def.	Simon Carington	TKO (Punches)	1	3:51
	Anthony Liles	def.	Mark Carling	TKO (Doctor Stoppage)	1	5:00
	Luiz Henrique Tosta	def.	Tom Dixon	Submission (Triangle Choke)	1	1:17
	Huseyin Garabet	def.	Peter Waterhouse	Submission (Armbar)	1	3:26
	Ben Spinks	def.	Ricci Woodwood	Submission (Guillotine Choke)	2	3:13

== UCMMA 19: Lights Out ==
UCMMA 19: Lights Out was an event held on March 26, 2011, at The Troxy in London, England, United Kingdom.

=== Results ===
Main Card
Weight class				Method	Round	Time	Notes
	Oli Thompson	def.	Ben Smith	Submission (Rear-Naked Choke)	2	3:45
	Marcin Bartkiewicz	def.	Ian Hawkings	TKO (Punches)	2	3:13
	Giorgio Andrews	def.	James Lutman	TKO (Punch)	1	0:00
	Iain Martell	def.	Chris Harman	TKO (Punches)	1	2:24
	Djo Lema	def.	Joe Holder	TKO (Punches)	1	0:00
	Dyson Roberts	def.	Colin French	Submission (Elbows)	1	0:00
	Colin Wilby	def.	Harry Shoebridge	KO (Punch)	1	0:00
	Rafik Benziada	def.	Tomas Siaucila	TKO (Punches)	1	0:00
	Cory Tait	def.	Danny Pearson	TKO (Punches)	1	0:00
	Ben Craggy	def.	John Donoghue	TKO (Punches)	1	0:00
	Wendle Lewis	def.	Mehemet Adnan	TKO (Punches)	1	4:58
	Dan Movahedi	def.	Joe Stevenson	Submission (Rear-Naked Choke)	1	0:00

== UCMMA 20: Fists of Fire ==
UCMMA 20: Fists of Fire was an event held on May 14, 2011, at The Troxy in London, England, United Kingdom.

=== Results ===
Main Card
Weight class				Method	Round	Time	Notes
	John Maguire	def.	Jamaine Facey	Submission (Kimura)	2	4:23
	Tomasz Czerwinski	def.	Amokrane Sabet	KO (Punch)	1	0:00
	Nathan Beer	def.	David Lee	Decision (Unanimous)	3	5:00
	Deividas Banaitis	def.	Ben Smith	Submission (Punches)	1	0:00
	Karl Lawrence	def.	David Zetolofsky	TKO (Punches)	1	3:58
	Khalid Ismail	def.	Wayne Brown	TKO (Leg Injury)	1	0:08
	Chad Griffiths	def.	Huseyin Garabet	TKO (Punches)	3	2:38
	Peter Waterhouse	def.	John Brightwell	TKO (Punches)	1	2:17
	Andy McEwan	def.	Danny Pearson	Submission (Guillotine Choke)	1	0:46

== UCMMA 21: Stand Your Ground ==
UCMMA 21: Stand Your Ground was an event held on June 25, 2011, at The Troxy in London, England, United Kingdom.

=== Results ===
Main Card
Weight class				Method	Round	Time	Notes
	Oli Thompson	def.	Mark Potter	Submission (Rear-Naked Choke)	1	2:55
	Denniston Sutherland	def.	Mark Weir	KO (Punches)	1	3:20
	Michael Pastou	def.	Dominic Plumb	DQ (Illegal Elbows)	1	1:00
	Ben Smith	def.	Ian Hawkings	TKO (Punches)	1	1:40
	Dean Amasinger	def.	Ross Pointon	Decision (Unanimous)	3	5:00
	Bola Omoyele	def.	Trevor Sokonater	Submission (Punches)	1	0:00
	Edgelson Lua	def.	Lee Doski	Decision (Unanimous)	3	5:00
	Luke Newman	def.	Mehemet Adnan	TKO (Punches)	1	1:27
	Jamie O'Keefe	def.	Davin Byfield	TKO (Punches)	3	4:35
	Wendle Lewis	def.	Jason Cooledge	Decision (Unanimous)	3	5:00
	Andy McEwan	def.	Danny Pearson	Submission (Rear-Naked Choke)	1	1:23
	Conrad Hayes	def.	Paul Parkhouse	Submission (Rear-Naked Choke)	1	2:35
	Patrick Jalloh	def.	Peter Waterhouse	TKO (Punches)	1	2:02

== UCMMA 22: Warrior Creed ==
UCMMA 22: Warrior Creed was an event held on August 6, 2011, at The Troxy in London, England, United Kingdom.

=== Results ===
Main Card
Weight class				Method	Round	Time	Notes
	Alex Reid	def.	Jason Barrett	Submission (Triangle Choke)	1	2:19
	Iain Martell	def.	Karl Lawrence	Submission (Rear-Naked Choke)	1	4:30
	Spencer Hewitt	def.	Andy McEwan	Submission (Rear-Naked Choke)	1	1:59
	Karen Ousey	def.	Anna Zucchelli	Decision (Majority)	3	5:00
	Darren Towler	def.	Tomasz Czerwinski	TKO (Punches)	1	N/A
	Jack Mason	def.	Miguel Bernard	TKO (Punches)	1	N/A
	Przemyslaw Mysiala	def.	Chris Harman	Submission (Kimura)	1	1:03
	Charlie Francis	def.	Sam Morrison	TKO (Punches)	2	2:36

== UCMMA 23: Go 4 It ==
UCMMA 23: Go 4 It was an event held on September 17, 2011, at The Troxy in London, England, United Kingdom.

=== Results ===
Main Card
Weight class				Method	Round	Time	Notes
	John Maguire	def.	Peter Irving	Decision (Unanimous)	3	5:00
	Darren Towler	def.	Ben Smith	TKO (Doctor Stoppage)	1	0:00
	Cory Tait	def.	Nathan Beer	TKO (Punches)	2	0:00
	Jamaine Facey	def.	Ross Pointon	KO (Flying Knee and Punches)	1	3:06
	Davin Byfield	def.	Rae Edgar	Submission (Rear-Naked Choke)	1	0:00
	Brett Bassett	def.	Ben Craggy	Submission (Armbar)	2	0:00
	Afakasi Sione	def.	Peter Waterhouse	TKO (Punches)	1	0:00
	Sam Boo	def.	Dominic Taylor	Submission (Guillotine Choke)	2	0:00
	Ricky Campbell	def.	Damien Carroll	Submission (Rear-Naked Choke)	1	0:00
	Rory Beackon	def.	Nath Hutchins	TKO (Punches)	1	0:00
	Jason Cooledge	def.	Matt Robinson	Decision (Unanimous)	3	5:00
	Florian Calin	def.	Salih Kulucan	Submission (Guillotine Choke)	1	0:00

== UCMMA 24: Hands of War ==
UCMMA 24: Hands of War was an event held on October 22, 2011, at The Troxy in London, England, United Kingdom.

=== Results ===
Main Card
Weight class				Method	Round	Time	Notes
	Jimi Manuwa	def.	Nick Chapman	TKO (Knees)	1	2:14
	Tomasz Czerwinski	def.	Ian Hawkings	TKO (Punches)	1	1:25
	Michael Pastou	def.	Dominic Plumb	Decision (Unanimous)	3	5:00
	Bola Omoyele	def.	Lee Doski	TKO (Knee and Punches)	1	0:42
	Tommy Maguire	def.	Joe Holder	Submission (Kimura)	2	3:06
	Luke Newman	def.	Andy Cona	Submission (Rear-Naked Choke)	1	1:17
	Shane Fourie	def.	Rafik Benziada	TKO (Doctor Stoppage)	1	5:00
	Daniel Shortman	def.	Mark Carling	DQ (Illegal Liver Kick)	1	2:03
	Ben Callum	def.	Jason Radcliffe	KO (Punch)	1	0:56
	Amil Smith	def.	Jody Cottham	Decision (Unanimous)	3	5:00
	Max Nunes	def.	Grant Murray	Submission (Rear-Naked Choke)	1	2:12
	Steve Stanley	def.	Huseyin Garabet	Submission (Armbar)	3	1:01
	Eddie Kone	def.	Peter Waterhouse	Submission (Triangle Choke)	1	1:57

== UCMMA: Dominican Republic ==
UCMMA: Dominican Republic was an event held on November 6, 2011, at the Hard Rock Casino in Punta Cana, Dominican Republic.

=== Results ===
Main Card
Weight class				Method	Round	Time	Notes
	Jamaine Facey	def.	Sam Boo	KO (Knee)	1	0:34
	Tim Radcliffe	def.	Wesley Murch	Submission (Rear-Naked Choke)	1	2:55
	Iain Martell	def.	Neil Bittong	TKO (Doctor Stoppage)	2	1:45
	Richard Griffin	def.	Ross Pointon	Submission (Guillotine Choke)	1	2:12
	Ben Craggy	def.	Miguel Bernard	Submission (Rear-Naked Choke)	1	0:41

== UCMMA: Contenders ==
UCMMA: Contenders was an event held on November 6, 2011, in Brighton, East Sussex, England.

=== Results ===
Main Card
Weight class				Method	Round	Time	Notes
	Laura Howarth	def.	Melanie Burroughs	KO (Kick to the Body)	1	2:50

== White Collar MMA 2 ==
White Collar MMA 2 was an event held on November 12, 2011, at The Troxy in London, England, United Kingdom.

== UCMMA 25: The Beat Down ==
UCMMA 25: The Beat Down was an event held on December 3, 2011, at The Troxy in London, England, United Kingdom.

=== Results ===
Main Card
Weight class				Method	Round	Time	Notes
	Jake Bostwick	def.	Denniston Sutherland	KO (Punch)	1	4:25
	Ben Smith	def.	Ricky Campbell	Submission (Rear-Naked Choke)	2	1:17
	Iain Martell	def.	Earl Brown	TKO (Punches)	1	3:11
	Carl hunt	def.	Spe McMorris	Submission (Punches)	1	1:09
	Wendle Lewis	def.	Andy Cona	Submission (Rear-Naked Choke)	1	3:57
	Lee Caers	def.	Ben Craggy	Submission (Guillotine Choke)	1	2:07
	Jason Radcliffe	def.	Peter Craete	Submission (Punches)	1	0:26
	Nathan Greyson	def.	Steve Brazier	TKO (Doctor Stoppage)	1	1:33
	Brendon Katz	def.	Huseyin Garabet	Submission (Rear-Naked Choke)	1	4:01
	Esi Moradi	def.	Mickey Millar	Submission (Kimura)	1	1:00
