= UFC 138 =

UFC mixed martial arts event in 2011

UFC 138: Leben vs. Muñoz
- The poster for UFC 138: Leben vs. Muñoz
- Promotion: Ultimate Fighting Championship
- Date: November 5, 2011
- Venue: LG Arena
- City: Birmingham, United Kingdom
- Attendance: 10,823
- Total gate: $1,500,000

Event chronology
UFC 137: Penn vs. Diaz	UFC 138: Leben vs. Muñoz	UFC on Fox: Velasquez vs. dos Santos

UFC 138: Leben vs. Muñoz was a mixed martial arts event held by the Ultimate Fighting Championship on November 5, 2011, at LG Arena in Birmingham, United Kingdom. The event aired on the same day, via tape delay, on Spike TV in the United States and live on Sportsnet in Canada. The event was the second that the UFC has hosted in Birmingham, the first was UFC 89 back in 2008 also featuring Chris Leben in the main event.

== Background ==
After several tentatively scheduled 2011 events at various locations around the United Kingdom did not materialize, including Glasgow, Liverpool, London as well as a planned return to Ireland, it was expected that the organization would not hold an event in the area during 2011.

The main event was the first non-title five round fight in the history of the UFC.

Mark Scanlon was expected to face James Head at this event. However, Scanlon was pulled from the bout and replaced by promotional newcomer John Maguire Then, on September 28, Head himself pulled out of the fight due to an undisclosed injury and was replaced by Justin Edwards.

Pascal Krauss was expected to face John Hathaway at this event. However, on August 30 Krauss pulled out of the bout citing a shoulder injury, and was replaced by Matt Brown. Then on October 17 it was announced that Hathaway was forced to withdraw from the bout due to injury as well. As a result, Brown was pulled from the event and will face Seth Baczynski at UFC 139.

Phil De Fries was expected to face Oli Thompson at this event. However, on October 17 it was announced that Thompson was forced to withdraw from the bout due to injury. De Fries fought Rob Broughton at this event instead.

Anthony Njokuani was scheduled to fight Paul Taylor on the main card. However, Taylor sustained a whiplash injury during a minor traffic collision on November 1 forcing him from the bout. Due to insufficient time to find a replacement, Njokuani was moved to a future card, while a prelim fight between Cyrille Diabate and Anthony Perosh was promoted to the main card.

This event averaged 1.8 million viewers on Spike TV.

After the event Chris Leben tested positive for illegal substances and was subsequently suspended for a year.

== Results ==
Main card
Weight class				Method	Round	Time	Notes
Middleweight	Mark Muñoz	def.	Chris Leben	TKO (corner stoppage)	2	5:00	(Note: First non-title bout scheduled for 5 rounds in UFC history. Leben tested positive for oxycodone and oxymorphone.)
Bantamweight	Renan Barão	def.	Brad Pickett	Submission (rear-naked choke)	1	4:09
Welterweight	Thiago Alves	def.	Papy Abedi	Submission (rear-naked choke)	1	3:32
Light Heavyweight	Anthony Perosh	def.	Cyrille Diabaté	Submission (rear-naked choke)	2	3:09
Lightweight	Terry Etim	def.	Edward Faaloloto	Submission (guillotine choke)	1	0:17
Preliminary card (Facebook)
Welterweight	John Maguire	def.	Justin Edwards	Decision (unanimous) (30–27, 30–27, 30–27)	3	5:00	(Note: This bout aired on the broadcast following the Muñoz vs Leben bout.)
Heavyweight	Phil De Fries	def.	Rob Broughton	Decision (unanimous) (29–28, 29–28, 29–28)	3	5:00
Featherweight	Michihiro Omigawa	def.	Jason Young	Decision (unanimous) (29–28, 29–28, 29–28)	3	5:00
Welterweight	Che Mills	def.	Chris Cope	TKO (knees and punches)	1	0:40	(Note: This bout aired on the broadcast following the Perosh vs Diabaté bout.)
Bantamweight	Chris Cariaso	def.	Vaughan Lee	Decision (split) (28–29, 29–28, 29–28)	3	5:00

== Bonus awards ==
The following fighters received $70,000 bonuses.

- Fight of the Night: Brad Pickett vs. Renan Barão
- Knockout of the Night: Che Mills
- Submission of the Night: Terry Etim
