= Cage Rage Championships =

Mixed martial arts promoter based in UK

- Type: Private
- Industry: Mixed martial arts promotion
- Founded: 2002; 24 years ago
- Defunct: 2008; 18 years ago
- Headquarters: London, United Kingdom
- Parent: ProElite

Cage Rage Championships, also known as Cage Rage, was a United Kingdom-based, mixed martial arts promotion that premiered on 7 September 2002 in London. Cage Rage went into liquidation and is now no longer trading. Cage Rage had been owned and managed by Elite XC until that company ceased operating, and the British promoters behind Cage Rage formed a new organization and withdrew all the old Cage Rage titles. Matchmaker and on-screen personality Dave O'Donnell was also a minority shareholder in the company. Fellow on-screen personality and co-promoter Andy Geer also owned a minority stake until he left the promotion in 2008. Cage Rage events were replayed on Nuts TV, along with their own weekday show on The Fight Network (UK & Ireland) until these channels closed down. Every Cage Rage event and bout is now archived as part of the UFC Fight Pass library.

== History ==
Cage Rage started when Dave O'Donnell and Andy Geir set out to raise money by promoting a small mixed martial arts show, to provide new mats for their martial arts school. The first Cage Rage event in Elephant and Castle, London was a success, which led to fans and fighters asking for a follow-up show, leading to further shows and promotion as it exists today.

In March 2007, after the purchase of PRIDE Fighting Championships by Frank Fertitta III and Lorenzo Fertitta from Dream Stage Entertainment, Cage Rage were announced as members of a promotional alliance instigated by ProElite and FEG, the parent companies of EliteXC and Hero's respectively, along with Strikeforce, BodogFight K-1 and Spirit MC.

However, this working relationship barely lasted a month. When Cage Rage signed K-1 star Bob Sapp to a main event in London for their show on 21 April 2007, K-1 stopped Sapp from fighting on the card. This left a desperate Geer and O'Donnell scrambling for a new main event on just days notice with aged veteran Tank Abbott eventually stepping in.

Due to the closeness of the two promotions, ProElite purchased the majority shareholding in Cage Rage in September 2007 from Cage Rage's silent partner John Faraday.

Andy Geer Left the group he founded in April 2008, and was replaced by former King of the Cage boss Christopher Cordeiro.

In May 2008, Sky Sports said in a statement they would no longer be airing Cage Rage events on their channels. The official line was that they could not continue with Cage Rage as a fighter (Paul Daley) had sworn on live TV on a previous show. However, this was thought to be an excuse as the incident (where Daley used several sexual curse words) took place well after the 9pm "watershed". Much more likely Sky was disappointed with the average 19,000 viewers Cage Rage was getting.

Since the closure of Cage Rage, Dave O'Donnell created Cage Rage UK, the parent company of another Mixed Martial Arts promotion, Ultimate Challenge MMA (UCMMA).

== Rules ==
Cage Rage's rules were based upon the Unified Rules of Mixed Martial Arts that were originally established by the New Jersey State Athletic Control Board and modified by the Nevada State Athletic Commission. These rules were adopted across the US in other states that regulate mixed martial arts. As a result, they became the standard de facto set of rules for professional mixed martial arts across the US and for cage-based MMA worldwide.

At Cage Rage 13, amendments to the Unified Rules were made, most notably the "Open Guard" rule and the banning of elbow strikes to a downed opponent.

=== Rounds ===
All Cage Rage fights were contested over three, five-minute rounds, with a one-minute rest period in-between rounds.

=== Weight divisions ===
Cage Rage had six weight classes:

| Weight class name | Upper limit | |
| Weight class name | in pounds (lb) | in kilograms (kg) |
|---|---|---|
| Featherweight | 145 | 65.7 |
| Lightweight | 155 | 70.3 |
| Welterweight | 170 | 77.1 |
| Middleweight | 185 | 83.9 |
| Light Heavyweight | 205 | 93.0 |
| Heavyweight | Unlimited | |

=== Cage ===
Cage Rage used an eight-sided caged arena to stage bouts similar to the UFC's trademarked Octagon, though it was smaller in size. It had foam padding around the top and between each of the eight sections, with two entry/exit gates on opposite sides. Unlike a UFC cage where the side-walls are made of vinyl-coated fencing, the Cage Rage cage used nylon netting as its barrier. The canvas was marked with a line a metre away from the fence at all points.

=== Attire ===
As per the Unified Rules of MMA, Cage Rage only allowed competitors to fight in approved shorts, without shoes or any other sort of foot padding. Fighters used approved light gloves (4-6 ounces) that allow fingers to grab.

=== Match outcome ===
Matches usually end via:

- Submission: a fighter taps on the mat or his opponent three times (or more) or verbally submits.
- Knockout: a fighter falls from a legal blow and is either unconscious or unable to immediately continue.
- Technical Knockout: stoppage of the fight by the referee if it is determined a fighter cannot "intelligently defend" himself or by ringside doctor due to injury.
- Judges' Decision: Depending on scoring, a match may end as:
  - unanimous decision (all three judges score a win for one fighter),
  - split decision (two judges score a win for one fighter with the third for the other),
  - majority decision (two judges score a win for one fighter with one for a draw),
  - unanimous draw (all three judges score a draw),
  - majority draw (two judges score a draw).
  - split draw (the total points for each fighter is equal)

A fight can also end in a technical decision, technical draw, disqualification, forfeit or no contest.

=== Judging criteria ===
The 10-point must system was used for all Cage Rage fights; three judges score each round and the winner of each receives ten points, the loser nine points or less. If the round is even, both fighters receive ten points. The decision is announced at the end of the match but the judge's scorecards are not announced.

=== Fouls ===
The following are considered fouls in Cage Rage:

1. Butting with the head.
2. Eye gouging of any kind.
3. Biting.
4. Hair pulling.
5. Fish hooking.
6. Groin attacks of any kind.
7. Putting a finger into any orifice or into any cut or laceration on an opponent. (see Fish-hooking)
8. Small joint manipulation.
9. Striking to the spine or the back of the head. (see Rabbit punch)
10. Striking downward using the point of the elbow. (see Elbow (strike))
11. Throat strikes of any kind, including, without limitation, grabbing the trachea.
12. Clawing, pinching or twisting the flesh.
13. Grabbing the clavicle.
14. Kicking the head of a grounded opponent, unless an open guard has been called (as of 10 September 2005).
15. Kneeing the head of a grounded opponent, unless an open guard has been called (as of 10 September 2005).
16. Stomping a grounded opponent, unless an open guard has been called (as of 10 September 2005).
17. Elbow strikes to a grounded opponent (as of 10 September 2005).
18. Kicking to the kidney with the heel.
19. Spiking an opponent to the canvas on his head or neck. (see piledriver (professional wrestling))
20. Throwing an opponent out of the ring or fenced area.
21. Holding the shorts or gloves of an opponent.
22. Spitting at an opponent.
23. Engaging in an unsportsmanlike conduct that causes an injury to an opponent.
24. Holding the ropes or the fence.
25. Using abusive language in the ring or fenced area.
26. Attacking an opponent on or during the break.
27. Attacking an opponent who is under the care of the referee.
28. Attacking an opponent after the bell has sounded the end of the period of unarmed combat.
29. Flagrantly disregarding the instructions of the referee.
30. Timidity, including, without limitation, avoiding contact with an opponent, intentionally or consistently dropping the mouthpiece or faking an injury.
31. Interference by the corner.
32. Throwing in the towel during competition.

When a foul is charged, the referee in their discretion may deduct one or more points as a penalty. If a foul incapacitates a fighter, then the match may end in a disqualification if the foul was intentional, or a no contest if unintentional. If a foul causes a fighter to be unable to continue later in the bout, it ends with a technical decision win to the injured fighter if the injured fighter is ahead on points, otherwise it is a technical draw.

=== Match conduct ===
The referee has the right to stop the fighters and stand them up if they reach a stalemate on the ground (where neither are in a dominant position nor working toward one) after a verbal warning.

=== Defunct rules ===
==== The "Open Guard" rule ====
Cage Rage was the home of a unique rule in the world of cage-based MMA; the "open guard" rule. Designed to prevent stalling on the ground, it allowed a standing fighter to use strikes on a downed opponent that would otherwise be fouls.

If a downed fighter was at least a meter away from the cage, on his back and able to avoid or defend against attacks, the referee would raise his arm and call "open guard". Once an open guard was called, the standing fighter could use the following attacks on their opponent:

- stomps,
- kicks or knees to the head
- flying attacks

Unless an open guard has been called, these strikes were fouls.

This rule was introduced at Cage Rage 13 and was designed to prevent a fighter from laying in an open guard where his opponent can only throw leg kicks or drop to initiate grappling. However, due to their ongoing desire to standardise rules across the UK and work with a potential MMA board of control, this rule was scrapped.

== Events ==
The first Cage Rage event featured top British fighters, such as Matt Ewin and Robbie Olivier, and international fighters, such as Chute Boxe Academy-trained Jean Silva. This formula has continued down the years since the first show, with such top domestic fighters like Ian Freeman and Michael Bisping appearing, as well as internationally known fighters like Murilo Rua and Anderson Silva.

Cage Rage 26 was the first main Cage Rage show to be held outside London.

=== Cage Rage Contenders ===
In early 2006, Cage Rage Championships launched Cage Rage Contenders, a secondary-level show for up-and-coming fighters to showcase their skills. Trying to conjure up the feel of early Cage Rage shows, these shows take place in a nightclub setting with VIP tables surrounding the cage.

Cage Rage also aimed to franchise the Contenders name to other promoters across the country, the first promoter of which was Jay Gilbey of Intense Fighting in Peterborough.

Since then, Contenders shows have been expanded to Ireland, Wales and Nottingham.

== Final champions ==
| Division | British Champion | Since | World Champion | Since |
|---|---|---|---|---|
| Heavyweight | Mustapha Al Turk | Cage Rage 27 | Antônio Silva | Cage Rage 12 |
| Light Heavyweight | Ian Freeman | Cage Rage 26 | Vitor Belfort | Cage Rage 23 |
| Middleweight | Matt Ewin | Cage Rage 19 | Anderson Silva | Cage Rage 8 |
| Welterweight | Che Mills | Cage Rage 26 | Paul Daley | Cage Rage 23 |
| Lightweight | Abdul Mohamed | Cage Rage 13 | Vítor Ribeiro | Cage Rage 13 |
| Featherweight | Robbie Olivier | Cage Rage 18 | Masakazu Imanari | Cage Rage 20 |

== Notable fighters ==
=== Champions ===
The following fighters (in alphabetical order) have won titles in Cage Rage and are well known in the world of MMA.

- Mostapha al-Turk
- Vitor "The Phenom" Belfort
- Michael "The Count" Bisping
- Paul "Semtex" Daley
- Ian "The Machine" Freeman
- Zelg "Benkei" Galešić
- Masakazu "Ashikan Judan" Imanari
- Chris "Lights Out" Lytle
- Melvin "No Mercy" Manhoef
- Che "Beautiful" Mills
- Brad "One Punch" Pickett
- Vítor Ribeiro
- "Relentless" Paul Taylor
- Anderson "The Spider" Silva
- Antônio "Bigfoot" Silva
- Mark "the Wizard" Weir

=== Other fighters ===
Non-titleholders who have competed in other top-level promotions.

- Tank Abbott
- John Hathaway
- Travis Lutter
- Evangelista "Cyborg" Santos
- Jason Barrett
- Jorge Rivera
- Murilo "Ninja" Rua
- Babalu Sobral
- Lee Hasdell
- Eric 'Butterbean' Esch
- Gary Turner
- Ken "The World's Most Dangerous Man" Shamrock
- Herb Dean
- Alex Reid
- Tom "Kong" Watson
- James "The Colossus" Thompson
- Mark "The Smashing Machine" Kerr
- Marius "Whitemare" Zaromskis
- Lee Murray
- Cyrille "The Snake" Diabate
- Matt "The Law" Lindland
- Gesias Cavalcante
- Dave Legeno
- Akira "Mr. Pride" Shoji
- Daijiro Matsui
- Michael McDonald
- Ross "The Gladiator" Pointon
- James "The Hammer" McSweeney
- Mario Sperry
- Neil "Goliath" Grove
- Elvis "The King of Rock and Rumble" Sinosic
- Drew Fickett
- Phil "The New York Badass" Baroni
- Ronnie "Iron" Mann
- Rob "The Bear" Broughton
- Dan "The Beast" Severn
- Chris Brennan
- Rodney "The Silent Assassin" Glunder
