= Ultimate Challenge MMA =

MMA promoter based in United Kingdom

UCMMA
- Company type: Private
- Industry: Mixed martial arts promotion
- Founded: 2008; 18 years ago
- Founders: Dave O'Donnell; Tony Colasanto
- Headquarters: London, England
- Parent: Cage Rage Championships
- Website: http://www.ucmma.tv/

Ultimate Challenge MMA (also referred to as UCMMA) is a mixed martial arts promotion based in the United Kingdom. It is shown live on London Live in the UK, Fight Now TV in the US and on Viewster in several other countries.

== History ==
The collapse of EliteXC was quickly followed by Cage Rage with its final show Cage Rage 28 in 2008. Later that same year Dave O'Donnell, one of the original owners of Cage Rage, created Ultimate Challenge UK. Their first event 'Bad Breed' covered the spot where Cage Rage 29 was going to take place.

After a while of promoting many successful events, UCUK dropped the 'UK' out of the name and replaced it with 'MMA' becoming 'UCMMA'. UCMMA has been steadily approaching the same popularity that Cage Rage once enjoyed.

They have sponsorships with companies like Cash4Gold, Official Watches, MMA Sports Nutrition, and Coalition fight music.

On August 6, 2011, UCMMA 22 - Warrior Creed was shown on PPV channel Primetime.

UCMMA can now be watched on Fight Now TV in the United States in a landmark deal for the promotion. The contract with the network is set for one year as of February 2012.

All of UCMMA events from UCMMA 26 - The Real Deal can be purchased from high street retail stores such as Tesco, HMV, and Argos. It can also be purchased at online stores like Zavvi.com, Amazon.com, Lovefilm and The Hut Group.

On May 28, 2012, UCMMA was featured on BBC One programme How To Beat Pain, which was presented by Greg Whyte and Jack Krindler.

After White Collar MMA 6 (WCMMA), UK casting call were taken place at the Troxy for a new American reality show - Warrior Island. Dave O'Donnell hosted the casting call at the request by Global Proving Ground (GPG) President, James Jefferson. The reality show will be directed by Hollywood veteran Ben Perry.

On October 25 it was announced that, along with BAMMA and Cage Warriors, that UCMMA have united with The Centre of Health and Human Performance in London to launched SAFE MMA, a nonprofit organization established to improve the safety of MMA fighters in the U.K. Chief among the organization's plans is a centralized and confidential database for fighter medical records. SAFE MMA, which officially launches Jan. 1 2013, also will provide affordable, standardized blood and medical tests for all registered fighters, as well as advice from leading world experts in sports medicine, according to today's announcement.

As of November 21, 2012, UCMMA can also be seen on Canada's The Fight Network.

After Sky Sports cut out all MMA programming from their channels, UCMMA announced that they signed a deal with on-demand channel Primetime for a live broadcasting partnership.

=== Cage Fighter ===
They show their chat show, Cage Fighter, every Wednesday night on Sky Sports. Dave O'Donnell hosts the 30 minute show with Grant Waterman and interviews MMA fighters, shows clips of previous fights, GYM of the week, KO/Submission of the week and advertises their next event.

=== UK1 ===
UCMMA also shows kickboxing matches during their events, referring to them as 'UK1', named after the well known K-1 kickboxing company based in Japan. Because they hold these fights in the same events as they show MMA, the kickboxers use the cage to compete in.

Each fight will be a three 3 minute round with a minute rest period in between rounds, and if it's a draw one more round will be fought. Each round will be scored using the 10-point must system. Fighters using the most effective aggression and effective technique will win the round. Also the three knock-down rule applies, and a fighter can only be saved from a count by the bell in the final round. the choice to use MMA gloves or standard kickboxing gloves are agreed to by both fighters. Because of the pace of the action, if fighters get into a clinch they will be allowed a single knee strike and then must break clean. If the referee says ‘break’ they must not hit on the break. Rules are set so that certain things that are allowed in MMA are not used in the UK1 bouts, such as standing/clinching elbow strikes, ground fighting (grappling or striking), trips, takedowns or throws.

Since its first bouts, it has gained popularity, as it makes their fight card more exciting and keeps the audience entertained if the prior fights were boring due to slow pace striking or grappling. It also allows the company to reach the type of audience that dislikes the use of small 6oz MMA gloves, grappling and striking to a grounded opponent. There are also titles in each weight division, which follows the same as their MMA divisions.

=== White Collar MMA (WCMMA) ===
Dave O'Donnell created White Collar MMA (WCMMA), with the idea that "gives the average man the chance to experience the thrill of hand to hand combat inside the octagon. Competing in the disciplines of boxing, kick boxing, Muay Thai and MMA, WCMMA lets nine to fivers take the frustrations of the office out on the man to stands toe – 2 - toe with them in the cage." He says: ‘Every man who sits behind his desk at work watches MMA fights on YouTube or at home on TV can now give it a go. WCMMA gives that man the chance to live the dream. These guys will compete against each other in three 90 seconds rounds in a safe and controlled environment putting their skills to the test in a safe arena against fellow nine to fivers.’

Dave will oversee the conduct of fights to ensure that competitors are matched appropriately and that bouts are held under regulated conditions. The production will not reduce costs in safety-related areas. The event will also include amateur and semi-professional fights, providing opportunities for less experienced mixed martial artists to gain experience before turning professional.

=== Ultimate Ball ===
UCMMA created a new sport inside MMA during the early part of 2012 called 'Ultimate Ball'. The team-based sport, which combines sports such as rugby, American football, basketball and mixed martial arts, is played in the cage in which both sides try to get the rugby-shaped ball into the opposition's goal, with takedowns and body shots allowed. Ultimate Ball debut at UCMMA 27.

The concept to Ultimate Ball came to Dave O'Donnell around the time Cage Rage was at its highest peak, but had to wait until UCMMA grew bigger to make the sport happen.

The rules to Ultimate Ball are:

1. Two five-minute rounds
2. If there is a draw after ten minutes, then a one-minute additional time and the first player to score wins the game.
3. If after the one-minute extra time it is still a draw, it goes into penalty shootout until one time takes the lead.
4. To score, the ball must stay in the net to count.
5. One player can't score straight away until a teammate scores the next goal.
6. The ball must be passed twice before scoring a goal.
7. Four to a team, three active and one player must be sub (32-foot cage will have five players).
8. A team must have different fighter from Heavyweight downwards.
9. Heavyweight must be no more than 120 kilograms.
10. Subs must be Welterweight or below.
11. Substitution can only be made when a player is injured or at half time.
12. A red-carded player must sit out for 1 min of the game.
13. Restart from the centre of the cage.
14. At start of game and any restart, all players must be behind the ball.
15. Strikes and takedowns are allowed when a player has the ball (push kicks, punches to body, trips, sweeps and takedowns).
16. No punches on the floor, only grappling to get the ball.
17. Only the referee will decide who gets the restart, i.e. the player in possession of the ball.
18. If both players have the ball, referee will call a chest start (both players with chest on ball, with hands behind back until referee blows whistle to continue play).
19. If the ball goes out of the cage, the other team gets the restart.
20. If a player hits another player who doesn't have the ball deliberately, he will be sent off and a substitute cannot be used.
21. All players must be medically checked before taking part.
22. All players must wear groin and mouth guards while taking part.

Ultimate Ball tournament

Quarterfinals
Diesel Gym	4
Team Colosseum	0
Team Semtex	7
House of Pain	1
Blood Line	8
Team Razor	4
Team Gypsy	6
Team Wartime	2

Semifinals
Diesel Gym
Team Semtex
Blood Line
Team Gypsy

Finals

== UCMMA events ==
=== Past events ===
#	Event	Date	Venue	Location
83	UCMMA 61: Ultimate Challenge MMA 61	November 17, 2019	The Troxy	London, England, United Kingdom
82	UCMMA 60: Ultimate Challenge MMA 60	September 8, 2019	The Troxy	London, England, United Kingdom
81	UCMMA 59: Ultimate Challenge MMA 59	May 11, 2019	The Troxy	London, England, United Kingdom
80	UCMMA 58: Ultimate Challenge MMA 58	February 9, 2019	The Troxy	London, England, United Kingdom
79	WCMMA: Warrior Challenge 33	December 8, 2018	The Troxy	London, England, United Kingdom
78	UCMMA 57: Ultimate Challenge MMA 57	November 10, 2018	The Troxy	London, England, United Kingdom
77	WCMMA: Warrior Challenge 34	October 5, 2018	The Troxy	London, England, United Kingdom
76	UCMMA 56: Ultimate Challenge MMA 56	September 8, 2018	The Troxy	London, England, United Kingdom
75	WCMMA: Warrior Challenge 33	June 29, 2018	The Troxy	London, England, United Kingdom
74	UCMMA 55: Ultimate Challenge MMA 55	May 12, 2018	The Troxy	London, England, United Kingdom
73	WCMMA: Warrior Challenge 32	March 9, 2018	The Troxy	London, England, United Kingdom
72	UCMMA 54: Ultimate Challenge MMA 54	February 10, 2018	The Troxy	London, England, United Kingdom
71	WCMMA: Warrior Challenge 31	December 9, 2017	The Troxy	London, England, United Kingdom
70	UCMMA 53: Ultimate Challenge MMA 53	November 11, 2017	The Troxy	London, England, United Kingdom
69	WCMMA: Warrior Challenge 30	October 7, 2017	The Troxy	London, England, United Kingdom
68	UCMMA 52: Ultimate Challenge MMA 52	September 9, 2017	The Troxy	London, England, United Kingdom
67	WCMMA: Warrior Challenge 29	June 24, 2017	The Troxy	London, England, United Kingdom
66	UCMMA 51: Ultimate Challenge MMA 51	May 6, 2017	The Troxy	London, England, United Kingdom
65	WCMMA: Warrior Challenge 28	March 11, 2017	The Troxy	London, England, United Kingdom
64	UCMMA 50: Ultimate Challenge MMA 50	February 14, 2017	The Troxy	London, England, United Kingdom
63	WCMMA: Warrior Challenge 27	December 10, 2016	The Troxy	London, England, United Kingdom
62	UCMMA 49: Ultimate Challenge MMA 49	November 12, 2016	The Troxy	London, England, United Kingdom
61	WCMMA: Warrior Challenge 26	October 7, 2016	The Troxy	London, England, United Kingdom
60	UCMMA 48: Ultimate Challenge MMA 48	September 3, 2016	The Troxy	London, England, United Kingdom
59	WCMMA: Warrior Challenge 25	June 24, 2016	The Troxy	London, England, United Kingdom
58	UCMMA 47: Ultimate Challenge MMA 47	May 7, 2016	The Troxy	London, England, United Kingdom
57	UCMMA 46: Ultimate Challenge MMA 46	February 6, 2016	The Troxy	London, England, United Kingdom
57	WCMMA: Warrior Challenge 23	December 4, 2015	The Troxy	London, England, United Kingdom
56	UCMMA 45: Ultimate Challenge MMA 45	November 7, 2015	The Troxy	London, England, United Kingdom
55	WCMMA: Warrior Challenge 22	October 2, 2015	The Troxy	London, England, United Kingdom
54	UCMMA 44: Ultimate Challenge MMA 44	September 5, 2015	The Troxy	London, England, United Kingdom
53	WCMMA: Warrior Challenge 21	July 17, 2015	The Troxy	London, England, United Kingdom
52	WCMMA: Warrior Challenge 20	June 12, 2015	The Troxy	London, England, United Kingdom
51	UCMMA 43: Ultimate Challenge MMA 43	May 2, 2015	The Troxy	London, England, United Kingdom
50	UCMMA 42: Ultimate Challenge MMA 42	February 7, 2015	The Troxy	London, England, United Kingdom
49	UCMMA 41: Ultimate Challenge MMA 41	November 8, 2014	The Troxy	London, England, United Kingdom
48	UCMMA 40: Ultimate Challenge MMA 40	September 6, 2014	The Troxy	London, England, United Kingdom
47	UCMMA 39: Ultimate Challenge MMA 39	May 3, 2014	The Troxy	London, England, United Kingdom
46	UCMMA 38	February 1, 2014	The Troxy	London, England, United Kingdom
45	UCMMA 37	December 7, 2013	The Troxy	London, England, United Kingdom
44	UCMMA 36	October 5, 2013	The Troxy	London, England, United Kingdom
43	White Collar MMA 11	September 7, 2013	The Troxy	London, England, United Kingdom
42	UCMMA 35	August 3, 2013	The Troxy	London, England, United Kingdom
41	White Collar MMA 10	July 6, 2013	The Troxy	London, England, United Kingdom
40	UCMMA 34	June 1, 2013	The Troxy	London, England, United Kingdom
39	White Collar MMA 9	May 4, 2013	The Troxy	London, England, United Kingdom
38	UCMMA 33	April 6, 2013	The Troxy	London, England, United Kingdom
37	UCMMA 32	February 2, 2013	The Troxy	London, England, United Kingdom
36	UCMMA 31	December 1, 2012	The Troxy	London, England, United Kingdom
35	White Collar MMA 7	November 3, 2012	The Troxy	London, England, United Kingdom
34	UCMMA 30	October 6, 2012	The Troxy	London, England, United Kingdom
33	UCMMA 29	August 18, 2012	The Troxy	London, England, United Kingdom
32	UCMMA 28	May 26, 2012	The Troxy	London, England, United Kingdom
31	UCMMA 27	April 7, 2012	The Troxy	London, England, United Kingdom
30	UCMMA: Contenders	February 26, 2012		Brighton, East Sussex, England
29	UCMMA 26: The Real Deal	February 4, 2012	The Troxy	London, England, United Kingdom
28	UCMMA 25: The Beat Down	December 3, 2011	The Troxy	London, England, United Kingdom
27	White Collar MMA 2	November 12, 2011	The Troxy	London, England, United Kingdom
26	UCMMA: Contenders	November 6, 2011		Brighton, East Sussex, England
25	UCMMA: Dominican Republic	November 6, 2011	Hard Rock Casino	Punta Cana, Dominican Republic
24	UCMMA 24: Hands of War	October 22, 2011	The Troxy	London, England, United Kingdom
23	UCMMA 23: Go 4 It	September 17, 2011	The Troxy	London, England, United Kingdom
22	UCMMA 22: Warrior Creed	August 6, 2011	The Troxy	London, England, United Kingdom
21	UCMMA 21: Stand Your Ground	June 25, 2011	The Troxy	London, England, United Kingdom
20	UCMMA 20: Fists of Fire	May 14, 2011	The Troxy	London, England, United Kingdom
19	UCMMA 19: Lights Out	March 26, 2011	The Troxy	London, England, United Kingdom
18	UCMMA 18: Face Off	February 5, 2011	The Troxy	London, England, United Kingdom
17	UCMMA 17: Kings of the Cage	December 3, 2010	The Troxy	London, England, United Kingdom
16	UCMMA 16: Unbelievable	October 22, 2010	The Troxy	London, England, United Kingdom
15	UCMMA 15: Showdown	September 18, 2010	The Troxy	London, England, United Kingdom
14	UCMMA 14: Invincible	August 7, 2010	The Troxy	London, England, United Kingdom
13	UCMMA 13: Feel the Pain	July 20, 2010	The Troxy	London, England, United Kingdom
12	UCMMA 12: Never Back Down	June 8, 2010	The Troxy	London, England, United Kingdom
11	UCMMA 11: Adrenaline Rush	March 27, 2010	The Troxy	London, England, United Kingdom
10	UCMMA 10: Resurrection	February 6, 2010	The Troxy	London, England, United Kingdom
9	UCMMA 9: Fighting for Heroes	December 5, 2009	The Troxy	London, England, United Kingdom
8	UCMMA 8: Dynamite	October 24, 2009	The Troxy	London, England, United Kingdom
7	UCMMA 7: Mayhem	September 19, 2009	The Troxy	London, England, United Kingdom
6	UCMMA 6: Payback	August 22, 2009	The Troxy	London, England, United Kingdom
5	UCMMA 5: Heat	July 11, 2009	The Troxy	London, England, United Kingdom
4	UCMMA 4: Relentless	May 9, 2009	The Troxy	London, England, United Kingdom
3	UCMMA 3: Unstoppable	March 28, 2009	The Troxy	London, England, United Kingdom
2	UCMMA 2: Unbreakable	February 7, 2009	The Troxy	London, England, United Kingdom
1	UCMMA 1: Bad Breed	December 6, 2008	The Troxy	London, England, United Kingdom

== Current champions ==
=== MMA champions ===
Division	Upper weight limit	Champion	Since	Title Defenses	Next Fight
Heavyweight	265 lb (120.2 kg; 18.9 st)	(England) John Demmel	November 7, 2015 (UCMMA 45)	2	
Light Heavyweight	205 lb (93 kg; 14.6 st)	(England) Pelu Adetola	September 8, 2019 (UCMMA 60)	0	
Middleweight	185 lb (83.9 kg; 13.2 st)	(Romania) Alin Chirila	November 17, 2019 (UCMMA 61)	0	
Welterweight	170 lb (77.1 kg; 12.1 st)	(England) Jahreau Shepherd	November 17, 2019 (UCMMA 61)	0	
Lightweight	155 lb (70.3 kg; 11.1 st)	(England) Jack Collins	November 17, 2019 (UCMMA 61)	0	
Featherweight	145 lb (65.8 kg; 10.4 st)	(England) Nathan Greyson	September 9, 2017 (UCMMA 52)	0	
Bantamweight	135 lb (61.2 kg; 9.6 st)	(England) Paul Harper	September 8, 2018 (UCMMA 56)	0	
Flyweight	125 lb (57 kg; 8.9 st)	(England) Harry Keane	November 17, 2019 (UCMMA 61)	0	

=== Current 'UK1' champions ===
Division	Upper weight limit	Champion	Since	Title Defenses	Next Fight
Heavyweight	Above 205 lb (93 kg; 14.6 st)	(United Kingdom) Mike Neun	February 14, 2017 (UCMMA 50)	0	
Light Heavyweight	205 lb (93 kg; 14.6 st)	(United Kingdom) Nick Chapman	May 2, 2015 (UCMMA 43)	0	
Middleweight	185 lb (84 kg; 13.2 st)	(United Kingdom) Terry Brazier	February 14, 2017 (UCMMA 50)	0	
Welterweight	170 lb (77 kg; 12 st)	(United Kingdom) Galore Bofando	February 7, 2015 (UCMMA 42)	0	
Lightweight	155 lb (70 kg; 11.1 st)	(United Kingdom) Caleb Loo			
Featherweight	145 lb (66 kg; 10.4 st)	(United Kingdom) Danny lawson	April 6, 2013 (UCMMA 33)	0	
Bantamweight	135 lb (61 kg; 9.6 st)	(United Kingdom) Gio Marchese	November 7, 2015 (UCMMA 45)	0	
Flyweight	125 lb (57 kg; 8.9 st)	Vacant			

== Notable fighters in the UCMMA ==
The following have also competed for top tier promotions such as UFC

- Oli Thompson
- James McSweeney
- Jimi Manuwa
- Zelg Galešić
- Tom Watson
- Karlos Vemola
- Mark Weir
- John Maguire
- Paul Kelly
- Ross Pointon
- Jason Young
- Brad Pickett

Other promotions

- Linton Vassell
- Alex Reid
- Michael Page
- Jason Barrett
- Wesley '2Play' Johnson
- Andrew Tate
