= K-1 PREMIUM 2003 Dynamite!! =

K-1 martial arts event in 2003

- Promotion: K-1, Hero's
- Date: December 31, 2003
- Venue: Nagoya Dome
- City: Nagoya, Japan
- Attendance: 43,560

Event chronology
| Pride Shockwave | K-1 PREMIUM 2003 Dynamite!! | K-1 PREMIUM 2004 Dynamite!! |

K-1 PREMIUM 2003 Dynamite!! was an annual kickboxing and mixed martial arts event held by K-1 on New Year's Eve, Wednesday, December 31, 2003 at the Nagoya Dome in Nagoya, Japan. It featured 6 K-1 MMA rules fights, and 4 K-1 rules fights.

The event attracted a sellout crowd of 43,560 to the Nagoya Dome, and was broadcast across Japan on the TBS Network.

== Results ==
Main card
| Weight class | | | | Method | Round | Time | Notes |
|---|---|---|---|---|---|---|---|
| Heavyweight K-1 | (United States) Bob Sapp | def. | (Japan) Akebono | TKO (right hook) | 1 | 2:58 |
| Heavyweight K-1 MMA | (Japan) Shinsuke Nakamura | def. | (Belarus) Alexey Ignashov | TKO (knee) | 3 | 1:19 |
| Heavyweight K-1 MMA | (Japan) Yoshihiro Nakao | def. | (Georgia (country)) David Khakhaleishvili | Submission (punches) | 2 | 1:13 |
| Heavyweight K-1 | (Netherlands) Ernesto Hoost | def. | (Brazil) Montanha Silva | Decision (unanimous) | 3 | 3:00 |
| Heavyweight K-1 | (Brazil) Francisco Filho | def. | (New Zealand) Toa | Decision (unanimous) | 3 | 3:00 |
| Heavyweight K-1 | (Japan) Yusuke Fujimoto | def. | (South Africa) Francois Botha | Decision (unanimous) | 3 | 3:00 |
| Heavyweight K-1 MMA | (United States) The Predator | def. | (Brazil) Mauricio da Silva | TKO (punches) | 1 | 0:13 |
| Heavyweight K-1 MMA | (Japan) Masayuki Naruse | def. | (South Africa) Jan Nortje | Submission (rear-naked choke) | 1 | 4:40 |
| Heavyweight K-1 MMA | (Japan) Genki Sudo | def. | (United States) Butterbean | Submission (heel hook) | 2 | 0:41 |
| Heavyweight K-1 MMA | (France) Kristof Midoux | def. | (United States) Tom Howard | Submission (rear-naked choke) | 1 | 4:21 |

== See also ==
- List of K-1 events
- List of male kickboxers
- PRIDE Shockwave 2003
- INOKI BOM-BA-YE 2003
