= Antônio Silva (fighter) =

Brazilian kickboxer and mixed martial arts fighter (born 1979)

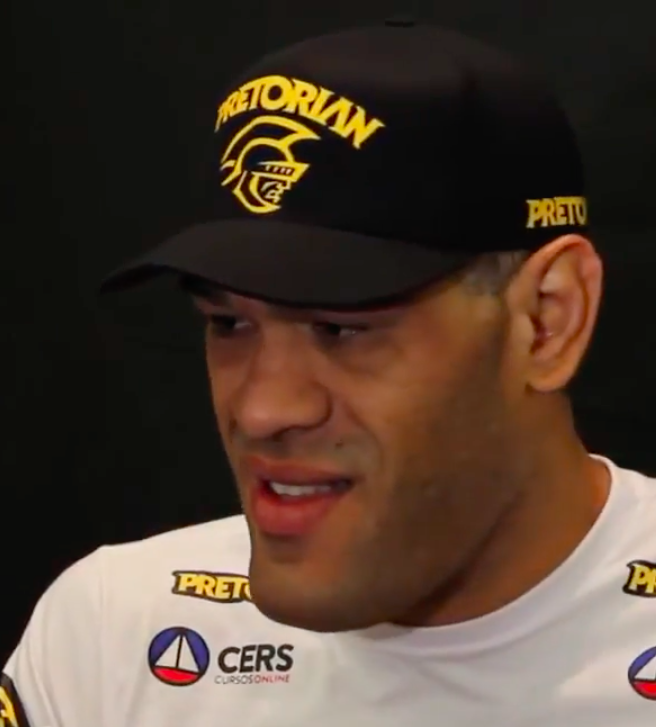
- Silva in 2013
- Born: 14 September 1979 (age 47); Brasília, Distrito Federal, Brazil
- Other names: Bigfoot
- Height: 6 ft 4 in (193 cm)
- Weight: 264 lb (120 kg; 18 st 12 lb)
- Division: Heavyweight; Super Heavyweight
- Reach: 82 in (208 cm)
- Stance: Orthodox
- Fighting out of: Campina Grande, Paraíba, Brazil
- Team: Wolfslair MMA (2005–2006); American Top Team (2006–2009, 2012–present); Blackzilians (2011–2012); Team Nogueira (2011–present)
- Rank: Black belt in Shotokan Karate; Black belt in Judo; Black belt in Brazilian Jiu-Jitsu
- Years active: 2005–present

Kickboxing record
- Total: 2
- Losses: 2
- By knockout: 2

Mixed martial arts record
- Total: 35
- Wins: 19
- By knockout: 15
- By submission: 2
- By decision: 2
- Losses: 15
- By knockout: 12
- By decision: 3
- Draws: 1

Other information
- Mixed martial arts record from Sherdog

Antônio Silva (born 14 September 1979) is a Brazilian retired professional mixed martial artist and kickboxer who formerly competed in the Heavyweight division. Silva has competed for the UFC, Strikeforce, EliteXC, Cage Rage, Fight Nights Global, World Victory Road, K-1 HERO'S, and Cage Warriors. He is the former EliteXC Heavyweight Champion, Cage Rage World Heavyweight Champion, and Cage Warriors Super Heavyweight Champion.

== Background ==
Originally from Brasília, Distrito Federal, Silva began training in karate at the age of four, and received his black belt at the age of 12. After 14 years of karate training, Silva transitioned to Brazilian jiu-jitsu and judo at the age of 17.

== Mixed martial arts career ==
=== Club affiliation ===
Silva began his career with the UK-based Wolfslair MMA Academy in 2005. In 2006, after his bout with Tadas Rimkevicius, Wolfslair requested (to Silva's instructor Mario Neto) that Silva leave the team and return to Brazil. The gym claims Silva owed it over £20,000; however, Silva states that it owed him £6,000 in fighter purses for two fights, for which he was promised £3,000 each. After training with Brazilian Top Team during the dispute, Silva joined American Top Team in Coconut Creek, Florida. He also trained at the Imperial Athletics gym in Boca Raton, Florida, for his quarterfinal bout with Fedor Emelianenko in the Strikeforce World Grand Prix Heavyweight Tournament.

=== Early career ===
Silva made his professional debut in the United Kingdom against Georgian fighter Tengiz Tedoradze, who would become the Cage Rage British Heavyweight Champion two fights later. Silva was impressive in his debut, winning by TKO only 47 seconds into the fight. In his next bout, Silva made his Cage Warriors debut and won again via strikes after his opponent submitted.

Silva then made his Cage Rage debut and became the Cage Rage World Heavyweight Champion after defeating his opponent via TKO. Silva then returned to Cage Warriors to fight longtime veteran Ruben "Warpath" Villareal for the Cage Warriors Super Heavyweight Championship and won again via TKO, and became the Cage Warriors Super Heavyweight Champion. Silva followed this up with a knockout win over Lithuanian fighter Tadas Rimkevicius before making his Japanese debut for K-1 Hero's. In his debut for the organization, he defeated longtime veteran Tom Erikson via TKO and then won his next fight by knockout.

This brought Silva's record to an undefeated 7–0 with all his wins coming by TKO/KO within the first round. Silva faced Eric Pele in his first and only fight with the BodogFIGHT promotion and was handed his first career loss with a controversial TKO.

=== EliteXC ===
On 10 February 2007, Silva made his EliteXC debut at EliteXC: Destiny, against UFC veteran Wesley Correira. Silva won by TKO due to strikes in the first round.

Silva was originally scheduled to fight on the Dynamite!! USA card as a representative of EliteXC. He was to face Jonathan Wiezorek, but the California State Athletic Commission (CSAC) discovered a benign tumor on his pituitary gland in his pre-fight medicals and refused to license the fighter. As a result, Silva underwent brain surgery that summer in order to have the tumor removed.

Post-surgery, Silva finally faced Jonathan Wiezorek at EliteXC: Renegade in November 2007. He won the fight by a rear-naked choke in the first round. His next victory came by split decision (28–29, 29–28, and 30–27) over former UFC Heavyweight Champion Ricco Rodriguez.

On 26 July 2008, Silva won the EliteXC Heavyweight Championship, with a second-round TKO win over UFC veteran Justin Eilers. Silva later tested positive for the anabolic steroid Boldenone, and was suspended for one year and fined $2,500 by the California State Athletic Commission. According to Silva's manager, Alex Davis, the positive test was caused by Silva's use of Novedex, a testosterone-booster he takes to raise his low testosterone levels (a symptom of his acromegaly). "He has to treat it", said Davis. "He spends between $6,000 and $8,000 a month just on medicine for it. He needs to be able to keep fighting to make a living. If it's between Antônio's health and pleasing the athletic commission, we have to choose his health."

=== Sengoku ===
Soon after, Silva signed on to fight at World Victory Road Presents: Sengoku no Ran 2009. He was advised not to fight in Japan by the California State Athletic Commission. He ignored this advice, and continued to claim that he had not used steroids. At 4 January 2009 event, he defeated Yoshihiro "KISS" Nakao by TKO when Nakao suffered a knee injury in the first round.

At Sengoku 10 he fought Jim York, winning by submission in the first round. With both fighters looking tentative on the feet, Silva took York down once, but was stood up by the referee. Later in the round, he took York down again, assuming the half-guard position and landing effective hammerfists and punches, before moving into an arm-triangle choke from the side control position to secure victory.

=== Strikeforce ===
On 7 November 2009, Silva suffered the second loss of his career, losing a unanimous decision to Fabrício Werdum at Strikeforce: Fedor vs. Rogers. After dominating the first round, Silva fractured his left hand in the beginning of the second.

Silva defeated former UFC Heavyweight Champion Andrei Arlovski on 15 May 2010, at Strikeforce: Heavy Artillery, via unanimous decision.

He was scheduled to face Valentijn Overeem on 4 Dec, but Overeem suffered an injury and withdrew from the fight. He was replaced by Mike Kyle. Kyle knocked down Silva in the first round with a punch, but Silva survived Kyle's ground and pound and recovered. In the second round, Silva mounted Kyle and forced a TKO stoppage with punches.

Silva defeated Fedor Emelianenko in the quarterfinal round of the 2011 Strikeforce World Grand Prix Heavyweight Tournament, via TKO (doctor stoppage) between the second and third rounds. He was expected to meet Alistair Overeem in the semifinals, but Overeem withdrew from the fight due to injury. He was replaced by one of the tournament alternates, Daniel Cormier. Cormier knocked Silva out with standing punches at 3:56 of round 1.

=== Ultimate Fighting Championship ===
On 7 January 2012, Antônio Rodrigo Nogueira told "Portal do Vale Tudo" Silva had signed a UFC contract. Silva was scheduled to debut against Roy Nelson on 26 May 2012 at UFC 146, but was rescheduled to face Cain Velasquez instead. Velasquez defeated Silva by TKO in the first round.

Silva faced Travis Browne on 5 October 2012 at UFC on FX 5. Early in the fight Browne injured his hamstring, limiting his movement. Silva capitalized on Browne's limited mobility by backing him against the cage. After a big right sent Browne to the canvas, Silva finished him off with strikes on the ground for a first-round TKO victory.

Silva next faced Alistair Overeem on 2 February 2013 at UFC 156. Leading up to the fight, Overeem was dismissive of Silva's skills, claiming he was better than his opponent in every aspect of MMA. Despite being a significant underdog and losing the first and second rounds, Silva won the fight via KO in the third round. The win also earned Silva his first Knockout of the Night honor.

Silva faced Cain Velasquez in a rematch for the UFC Heavyweight Championship on 25 May 2013 at UFC 160. Silva was rocked with a right hand early into the fight and finished again via TKO in the first round.

Silva faced Mark Hunt on 7 December 2013 at UFC Fight Night 33 in the main event. It was a back-and-forth affair that saw both men trade the advantage over five full rounds. The result was a majority draw (48–47 Hunt, 47–47, and 47–47). Post-fight, Dana White said the bout won Fight of the Night and, despite the draw result, both men would receive their win bonuses. Silva forfeited his win money and $50,000 Fight of the Night bonus to Hunt after failing a post-fight test for elevated testosterone (he had been undergoing UFC-approved testosterone replacement therapy). He was suspended for nine months, retroactive to the date of the fight.

Silva faced Andrei Arlovski in a rematch on 13 September 2014 at UFC Fight Night 51. He lost the fight via knockout in the first round. Following this fight, Silva returned to the hospital for surgery to remove a pituitary gland tumor - which causes his acromegaly - that had reemerged. The surgery was successful and he expects to return to fighting in 2015.

Silva was expected to face Frank Mir on 28 February 2015 at UFC 184. However, the bout with Mir was moved up a week and instead served as event headliner for UFC Fight Night 61. Silva lost the fight via knockout in the first round, as Mir dropped Silva with a left hook and finished him with a barrage of ground and pound.

Silva faced Soa Palelei on 1 August 2015 at UFC 190. He won the fight by TKO in the second round.

A rematch with Mark Hunt took place on 15 November 2015 at UFC 193. Silva lost the fight via TKO in the first round.

Silva next faced Stefan Struve on 8 May 2016 at UFC Fight Night 87. Silva lost the bout via knockout in the first round as he was stunned by a right hook on the chin followed with a knee to the body and multiple elbows to the side of his head.

Silva fought Roy Nelson on 24 September 2016 at UFC Fight Night 95. He lost the fight by knockout in the second round. Subsequently, he was released from the UFC.

=== Post-UFC career ===
After the release from UFC, Silva fought Ivan Shtyrkov in Russia on 18 November 2016. He lost the fight via unanimous decision.

He then faced Vitaly Minakov at Fight Nights Global 68 on 2 June 2017. He lost the fight via knockout in the second round.

On 28 July 2020, it was announced that Silva had signed a contract with Taura MMA. He was expected to make his promotional debut against Brett Martin at Taura MMA 11 on 30 October 2020. However, the bout was cancelled on the fight week.

Subsequently, Silva signed with Arena Fighting Championship and was expected to face Chris Barnett at AFC 2 on 12 December 2020, but the whole event was postponed due to multiple COVID-19 cases.

Silva made his return to MMA against Quentin Domingos on 13 June 2021 at Megdan Fighting 9. He lost the fight via TKO in the second round.

Silva was scheduled to headline Gamebred FC 2 against Alex Nicholson on September 11, 2021. However, his prevailing contract with Eagle Fighting Championship prevented him from competing at the event and he was replaced by Jonathan Ivey. In turn, Silva was scheduled to face Davit Modzmanashvili at an EFC event on September 26, 2021. However, Bigfoot Silva pulled out of the bout.

Silva was scheduled to face Tyrone Spong on January 28, 2022, at EFC 44. However, he was pulled from the bout to be replaced by Sergei Kharitonov.

Silva returned against Oleg Popov at MMA Series 53 on June 24, 2022. He lost the bout, getting knocked out 15 seconds into the 2nd round.

On December 27, 2022, Silva announced his retirement from MMA competition, intending to continue his involvement in the sport as a grappling and BJJ coach. However, in April 2023 it was announced that Bigfoot would face Salim El Ouassaidi in the main event of Kingdom Fighting 1 on Saturday the 10th of June. Silva lost the bout via unanimous decision and announced his retirement after the bout. However on June 18, Silva announced that he is coming out of retirement, expressing interest in a rematch against Salim El Ouassaidi. Silva fought Juan Espino at La Despedida, in the Gran Canaria Arena, on Saturday the 23rd of March 2024. The bout ended in a draw.

== Kickboxing ==
In August 2017, Silva signed with Glory Kickboxing, and made his debut against Rico Verhoeven at Glory 46 on 14 October 2017 in Guangzhou, China. After being dominated by arguably the No. 1 heavyweight kickboxer of the time, Silva was knocked down by a headkick in the second round. The referee stopped the fight less than a minute later officially ruling the match a TKO win for Verhoeven.

Silva was scheduled to challenge Grégory Tony for the World Kickboxing Network Super Heavyweight title at the final day of the WKN World Cup 2019 on 30 November 2019 in Auckland, New Zealand. The fight was cancelled due to the withdrawal of Silva, who was not medically cleared after suffering a defeat by knockout in his previous bout.

== Bare-knuckle boxing ==
On 16 August 2019, it was announced that Silva had signed a contract with the Bare Knuckle Fighting Championship. Subsequently, on 28 August 2019, it was announced that Silva would make his promotional debut headlining BKFC 8 against fellow UFC veteran Gabriel Gonzaga on 19 October 2019. He lost the fight by knockout in the second round.

== Personal life ==
In late 2020, Silva adopted twin brothers in his native Brazil.

== Championships and accomplishments ==
Mixed martial arts

- MMA Lineal championship
  - Heavyweight Lineal Championship (One time)
- EliteXC
  - EliteXC Heavyweight Championship (One time, first, last)
- Cage Rage
  - Cage Rage World Heavyweight Championship (One time, last)
- Cage Warriors
  - Cage Warriors Super Heavyweight Championship (One time)
  - One Successful Title Defense
- Strikeforce
  - 2011 Strikeforce Heavyweight Grand Prix semifinalist
- Ultimate Fighting Championship
  - Knockout of the Night (One time) vs. Alistair Overeem
  - Fight of the Night (forfeited after testing positive for elevated testosterone)
  - UFC.com Awards
    - 2013: Ranked #3 Fight of the Year vs. Mark Hunt, Ranked #7 Knockout of the Year, Half-Year Awards: Biggest Upset of the 1HY & Ranked #2 Upset of the Year vs. Alistair Overeem

== Mixed martial arts record ==
Professional record breakdown
35 matches	19 wins	15 losses
By knockout	15	12
By submission	2	0
By decision	2	3
Draws	1	

Res.	Record	Opponent	Method	Event	Date	Round	Time	Location	Notes
Loss	19–15–1	Salim El Ouassaidi	Decision (unanimous)	Kingdom Fighting 1	10 June 2023	3	5:00	Grenoble, France	
Loss	19–14–1	Oleg Popov	KO (punch)	MMA Series 53	24 June 2022	2	0:15	Moscow, Russia	
Loss	19–13–1	Quentin Domingos	TKO (punches)	Megdan Fighting 9	13 June 2021	2	0:30	Šabac, Serbia	
Loss	19–12–1	Vitaly Minakov	KO (punches)	Fight Nights Global 68	2 June 2017	2	1:37	Saint Petersburg, Russia	
Loss	19–11–1	Ivan Shtyrkov	Decision (unanimous)	Titov Boxing Promotion: Shtyrkov vs. Silva	18 November 2016	3	5:00	Yekaterinburg, Russia	
Loss	19–10–1	Roy Nelson	KO (punches)	UFC Fight Night: Cyborg vs. Lansberg	24 September 2016	2	4:10	Brasília, Brazil	
Loss	19–9–1	Stefan Struve	KO (elbows)	UFC Fight Night: Overeem vs. Arlovski	8 May 2016	1	0:16	Rotterdam, Netherlands	
Loss	19–8–1	Mark Hunt	TKO (punches)	UFC 193	15 November 2015	1	3:41	Melbourne, Australia	
Win	19–7–1	Soa Palelei	TKO (punches)	UFC 190	1 August 2015	2	0:41	Rio de Janeiro, Brazil	
Loss	18–7–1	Frank Mir	KO (elbows)	UFC Fight Night: Bigfoot vs. Mir	22 February 2015	1	1:40	Porto Alegre, Brazil	
Loss	18–6–1	Andrei Arlovski	KO (punches)	UFC Fight Night: Bigfoot vs. Arlovski	13 September 2014	1	2:59	Brasília, Brazil	
Draw	18–5–1	Mark Hunt	Draw (majority)	UFC Fight Night: Hunt vs. Bigfoot	7 December 2013	5	5:00	Brisbane, Australia	Fight of the Night.
Loss	18–5	Cain Velasquez	TKO (punches)	UFC 160	25 May 2013	1	1:21	Las Vegas, Nevada, United States	For the UFC Heavyweight Championship.
Win	18–4	Alistair Overeem	KO (punches)	UFC 156	2 February 2013	3	0:25	Las Vegas, Nevada, United States	Knockout of the Night.
Win	17–4	Travis Browne	TKO (punches)	UFC on FX: Browne vs. Bigfoot	5 October 2012	1	3:27	Minneapolis, Minnesota, United States	
Loss	16–4	Cain Velasquez	TKO (punches)	UFC 146	26 May 2012	1	3:36	Las Vegas, Nevada, United States	
Loss	16–3	Daniel Cormier	KO (punches)	Strikeforce: Barnett vs. Kharitonov	10 September 2011	1	3:56	Cincinnati, Ohio, United States	Strikeforce Heavyweight Grand Prix Semifinal.
Win	16–2	Fedor Emelianenko	TKO (doctor stoppage)	Strikeforce: Fedor vs. Silva	12 February 2011	2	5:00	East Rutherford, New Jersey, United States	Strikeforce Heavyweight Grand Prix Quarterfinal.
Win	15–2	Mike Kyle	TKO (punches)	Strikeforce: Henderson vs. Babalu II	4 December 2010	2	2:49	St. Louis, Missouri, United States	
Win	14–2	Andrei Arlovski	Decision (unanimous)	Strikeforce: Heavy Artillery	15 May 2010	3	5:00	St. Louis, Missouri, United States	
Loss	13–2	Fabrício Werdum	Decision (unanimous)	Strikeforce: Fedor vs. Rogers	7 November 2009	3	5:00	Hoffman Estates, Illinois, United States	
Win	13–1	Jim York	Submission (arm-triangle choke)	World Victory Road Presents: Sengoku 10	23 September 2009	1	3:51	Saitama, Japan	
Win	12–1	Yoshihiro Nakao	TKO (knee injury)	World Victory Road Presents: Sengoku no Ran 2009	4 January 2009	1	1:42	Saitama, Japan	
Win	11–1	Justin Eilers	TKO (knees and punches)	EliteXC: Unfinished Business	26 July 2008	2	0:19	Stockton, California, United States	Won the EliteXC Heavyweight Championship.
Win	10–1	Ricco Rodriguez	Decision (split)	EliteXC: Street Certified	16 February 2008	3	5:00	Miami, Florida, United States	
Win	9–1	Jonathan Wiezorek	Submission (rear-naked choke)	EliteXC: Renegade	10 November 2007	1	3:12	Corpus Christi, Texas, United States	
Win	8–1	Wesley Correira	TKO (punches)	EliteXC: Destiny	10 February 2007	1	3:49	Southaven, Mississippi, United States	
Loss	7–1	Eric Pele	TKO (punches)	BodogFight: USA vs. Russia	2 December 2006	1	2:40	Vancouver, British Columbia, Canada	
Win	7–0	Georgy Kaysinov	KO (punch)	Hero's 7	9 October 2006	1	1:08	Yokohama, Japan	
Win	6–0	Tom Erikson	TKO (punches)	Hero's 5	3 May 2006	1	2:49	Tokyo, Japan	
Win	5–0	Tadas Rimkevicius	TKO (punches)	Cage Warriors 21	25 March 2006	1	3:22	Coventry, England	Defended the Cage Warriors Super Heavyweight Championship.
Win	4–0	Ruben Villareal	TKO (punches)	Cage Warriors 17	26 November 2005	1	3:07	Coventry, England	Won the inaugural Cage Warriors Super Heavyweight Championship.
Win	3–0	Rafael Carino	TKO (corner stoppage)	Cage Rage 12	2 July 2005	1	2:55	London, England	Won the vacant Cage Rage World Heavyweight Championship.
Win	2–0	Marcus Tchinda	TKO (submission to punches)	Cage Warriors 12	21 May 2005	1	3:03	Coventry, England	
Win	1–0	Tengiz Tedoradze	TKO (punches)	UKMMAC 10	6 March 2005	1	0:48	Colchester, England	Heavyweight debut.

== Pay-per-view bouts ==
No.	Event	Fight	Date	Venue	City	PPV Buys
1.	UFC 160	Velasquez vs. Bigfoot 2	May 25, 2013	MGM Grand Garden Arena	Las Vegas, Nevada, United States	380,000

== Kickboxing record ==
Kickboxing record
0 Wins, 2 Losses
Date	Result	Opponent	Event	Location	Method	Round	Time	Record
2022-09-10	Loss	(Azerbaijan) Zabit Samedov	Mix Fight Championship	Baku, Azerbaijan	TKO (Referee stoppage)	1	2:18	0–2
2017-10-14	Loss	(Netherlands) Rico Verhoeven	Glory 46: China	Guangzhou, China	TKO (Referee stoppage)	2	0:43	0–1
Legend: Win Loss Draw/No contest Notes

== Professional boxing record ==
1 fight	0 wins	1 loss
By knockout	0	1

No.	Result	Record	Opponent	Type	Round, time	Date	Location	Notes
1	Loss	0–1	Viacheslav Datsik	TKO	2 (4), 0:44	July 8, 2022	Moscow, Russia	

== Bare knuckle record ==
Professional record breakdown
1 match	0 wins	1 loss
By knockout	0	1

Res.	Record	Opponent	Method	Event	Date	Round	Time	Location	Notes
Loss	0–1	Gabriel Gonzaga	KO (punches)	BKFC 8	19 October 2019	2	1:50	Tampa, Florida, United States	

== See also ==
- List of male mixed martial artists
- List of male kickboxers
- Double champions in MMA

== Footnotes ==
Achievements
New championship	1st Elite XC Heavyweight Champion; 26 July 2008 – 20 October 2008	Incumbent
New championship	1st Cage Warriors Super Heavyweight Champion; 26 November 2005 – present	Incumbent
Vacant Title last held by Ian Freeman	3rd Cage Rage World Heavyweight Champion; 2 July 2005 – 20 October 2008	Incumbent
