= EliteXC: Street Certified =

Elite Xtreme Combat MMA event in 2008

- The poster for EliteXC: Street Certified
- Promotion: EliteXC
- Date: February 16, 2008
- Venue: BankUnited Center
- City: Miami, Florida

Event chronology
EliteXC: Renegade	EliteXC: Street Certified	EliteXC: Primetime

EliteXC: Street Certified was a mixed martial arts event promoted by EliteXC that took place on Saturday, February 16, 2008, at the BankUnited Center in Miami, Florida.

== Background ==
The main card aired live on Showtime at 10p.m. EST, while the preliminary card streamed on Proelite.com.

The main event featured the return of Kevin "Kimbo Slice" Ferguson as he took on UFC veteran David "Tank" Abbott, a match originally scheduled for October 2007 in Cage Fury Fighting Championships.

The event drew an estimated 522,000 viewers on Showtime.

== Results ==
Main card (Showtime)
Weight class				Method	Round	Time	Notes
Heavyweight	Kimbo Slice	def.	Tank Abbott	KO (punches)	1	0:43
Heavyweight	Antônio Silva	def.	Ricco Rodriguez	Decision (split) (28-29, 29-28, 30-27)	3	5:00
Middleweight	Scott Smith	def.	Kyle Noke	KO (punch)	2	0:07
Lightweight	Yves Edwards	def.	James Edson Berto	KO (Flying Knee)	1	4:56
Heavyweight	Brett Rogers	def.	James Thompson	KO (strikes)	1	2:24
Preliminary card (Proelite.com)
Light Heavyweight	Rafael Cavalcante	def.	John Doyle	TKO (knee)	1	2:17
Middleweight	Yosmany Cabezas	def.	Jon Kirk	Submission (rear-naked choke)	2	0:58
Heavyweight	Dave Herman	def.	Mario Rinaldi	TKO (knees and punches)	3	0:33
Welterweight	Eric Bradley	def.	Mikey Gomez	Decision (unanimous)	3	5:00
Welterweight	Lorenzo Borgomeo	def.	Mike Bernhard	Submission (triangle choke)	2	4:11
Catchweight (210 lbs)	Moyses Gabin	def.	Jirka Hlavati	TKO (punches)	1	2:32

== See also ==
- Elite Xtreme Combat
- 2008 in Elite Xtreme Combat
