= World Victory Road Presents: Sengoku 7 =

Mixed martial arts event

- The poster for World Victory Road Presents: Sengoku 7
- Promotion: World Victory Road
- Date: March 20, 2009
- Venue: Yoyogi National Gymnasium
- City: Tokyo, Japan
- Attendance: 7,896

Event chronology
World Victory Road Presents: Sengoku no Ran 2009	World Victory Road Presents: Sengoku 7	World Victory Road Presents: Sengoku 8

World Victory Road Presents: Sengoku 7 was a mixed martial arts-event promoted by World Victory Road. It took place on March 20, 2009.

== Results ==
Main Card
Weight class				Method	Round	Time	Notes
Light Heavyweight	Muhammed Lawal	def.	Ryo Kawamura	Decision (Unanimous)	3	5:00
Heavyweight	Jim York	def.	James Thompson	KO (Punch)	1	4:33
Featherweight Grandprix 1st Round
Featherweight	Hatsu Hioki	def.	Chris Manuel	Submission (Triangle Armbar)	1	4:12
Featherweight	Nam Phan	def.	Hideki Kadowaki	TKO (Punches)	1	3:09
Featherweight	Michihiro Omigawa	def.	L.C. Davis	Decision (Unanimous)	3	5:00
Featherweight	Marlon Sandro	def.	Matt Jaggers	Submission (Arm-Triangle Choke)	2	2:57
Featherweight	Masanori Kanehara	def.	Jong Man Kim	Decision (Unanimous)	3	5:00
Featherweight	Chan Sung Jung	def.	Shintaro Ishiwatari	Submission (Rear-Naked Choke)	1	4:29
Featherweight	Ronnie Mann	def.	Tetsuya Yamada	Decision (Unanimous)	3	5:00
Featherweight	Nick Denis	def.	Seiya Kawahara	TKO (Punches)	1	2:36

== See also ==
- World Victory Road
- List of Sengoku champions
- 2009 in World Victory Road

== Notes ==
- WVR originally wanted both Shooto world champion "Lion Takeshi" Takeshi Inoue and Deep titlist Dokonjonosuke Mishima to participate in the tournament but Inoue was unable due to Shooto putting him on their May 10 fight card while Mishima suffered a knee injury.
- Michihiro Omigawa's fight with Shintaro Ishiwatari in Shooto on January 18 were originally scheduled to be an eliminator for participation in the tournament. However, the bout ended in a draw and both were later invited to participate.
