= Dave Herman (fighter) =

American mixed martial arts fighter

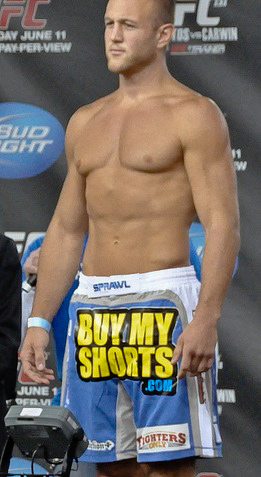
- Born: David John Herman; October 3, 1984 (age 42); Columbia City, Indiana, U.S.
- Other names: Pee-Wee
- Nationality: American
- Height: 6 ft 4 in (1.93 m)
- Weight: 223 lb (101 kg; 15 st 13 lb)
- Division: Heavyweight (265 lb)
- Reach: 77 in (196 cm)
- Fighting out of: Temecula, California, United States
- Team: Team Quest
- Years active: 2006–2014

Mixed martial arts record
- Total: 28
- Wins: 22
- By knockout: 17
- By submission: 3
- By decision: 2
- Losses: 6
- By knockout: 4
- By submission: 1
- By disqualification: 1

Other information
- Website: http://www.daveherman.net/
- Mixed martial arts record from Sherdog

David John Herman (born October 3, 1984) is a retired American mixed martial artist, who competed in the Heavyweight division of Titan FC, UFC, Bellator, EliteXC, World Victory Road, ShoXC, and Shark Fights. His nickname "Pee-Wee" is a reference of the character Pee-Wee Herman, created and portrayed by American comedian Paul Reubens.

== Background ==
Herman was born in Columbia City, Indiana, and raised in Fort Wayne, Indiana, attending Concordia Lutheran High School. At Concordia, Herman participated in various sports including football, track and field, and cross country. He also competed in wrestling for one month in his sophomore year before being expelled from the school. After taking his GED as a junior and spending a year at IPFW, Herman transferred to Indiana University at Bloomington, which has a Division I wrestling program.

Despite having basically no high school wrestling experience, Herman competed for Indiana as a walk-on and excelled, competing for three full years and part of a fourth year. He red-shirted his first season which was from 2003 to 2004 and held an impressive 28–9 record in his second season. He then claimed the exclusive starting role in his third season, holding a 28–16 record and qualifying for the NCAA tournament, in which he went 2–2. In a 2006 pre-season ranking, Herman was placed as high as eighth in the nation. In his fourth season Herman started off the season flawlessly, winning a tournament in November, but left a week later with no explanation for his departure, and later graduated from the university with a degree in general studies. Herman began training in mixed martial arts after watching one of his former college teammates train in the rising sport.

== Mixed martial arts career ==
=== Early career ===
Following a 2–0 amateur career, Herman made his professional mixed martial arts debut on December 31, 2006. He quickly amassed an undefeated 11–0 record, fighting 10 times throughout 2007, and went 13–0 before actually joining an MMA gym and officially begin training.

In 2008, Herman signed with the now defunct EliteXC organization. He debuted on the undercard of EliteXC: Street Certified, defeating Mario Rinaldi via TKO. His second bout came at EliteXC: Return of the King, where he defeated Ron Waterman via TKO. He next faced Kerry Schall in the main event of ShoXC 9, which would ultimately be the final show by the company.

Following the dissolution of EliteXC, Herman fought for a variety of promotions including Bellator Fighting Championships, Shark Fights and World Victory Road. Korean fighter Mu Bae Choi handed him his first loss in Japan on January 4, 2009, fighting in the Sengoku promotion. In his next fight Herman defeated Jim York at Sengoku 11.

In 2010, Herman became entangled in a lawsuit with Bellator that kept him out of action in the United States for just over a year. Once the legal issues were settled, Herman was scheduled to face Ricco Rodriguez at Bellator 31 but Rodriguez pulled out of the fight due to a knee injury. Michal Kita stepped in, and served as Rodriguez's replacement. Herman defeated him via first round submission.

Herman received his second loss after being disqualified for illegal knees to Rameau Thierry Sokoudjou. Herman then faced Yoshihiro Nakao at World Victory Road Presents: Soul of Fight. He won the fight via decision, the first fight in his career to go the distance.

=== Ultimate Fighting Championship ===
Herman was expected to make his promotional debut against Rob Broughton on June 11, 2011, at UFC 131. However, in late March, Broughton was replaced in the bout by Joey Beltran.

When Brock Lesnar pulled out of his main event fight with Junior dos Santos, Jon Olav Einemo's original opponent, Shane Carwin, stepped up to replace Lesnar against dos Santos. Herman instead fought fellow UFC newcomer Einemo. Herman defeated Einemo via TKO (punches) at 3:19 of round 2 in a back and forth bout that earned Fight of the Night honors.

Herman was scheduled to face Mike Russow on October 8, 2011, at UFC 136. However, the bout was cancelled after Herman failed his preliminary drug test in which he tested positive for marijuana. Herman denies using the prohibited substances.

Herman fought against Stefan Struve on February 15, 2012, at UFC on Fuel TV 1. He lost the fight via TKO in the second round.

Herman replaced Gabriel Gonzaga to face Roy Nelson on May 26, 2012, at UFC 146. He was defeated via KO in 51 seconds.

Herman next faced Antônio Rodrigo Nogueira on October 13, 2012, at UFC 153. Herman was submitted by Nogueira via armbar in the second round, receiving the first submission loss of his career.

Herman tested positive for marijuana for the second time after failing his post-fight drug test for UFC 153. He was suspended for six months and ordered to undergo treatment. The suspension was lifted in April 2013.

Herman was expected to face Shane del Rosario on July 6, 2013, at UFC 162. However, del Rosario was forced off the card due to injury and replaced by Gabriel Gonzaga. Herman lost the fight just 17 seconds into the first round by TKO. After losing four fights in a row, Herman was released from the UFC.

=== Titan Fighting Championship ===
On January 28, 2014, it was announced that Herman had signed a contract with Titan Fighting Championship.

Herman was expected to face Kalib Starnes at Titan FC 28 on April 25, 2014. However the event was delayed until May 16, 2014. He won the fight via unanimous decision.

Herman was expected to face Walt Harris at Titan FC 30 on September 26, 2014. However Harris was forced out of the bout with a back injury and the fight was then rescheduled to take place at Titan FC 32 on November 20, 2014. However the bout was scrapped after Harris re-signed with the UFC. Herman was then expected to face Jon Madsen for the Titan FC heavyweight championship at the event. On November 4, 2014, it was announced that Titan FC 32 would be postponed to December 19, 2014, and would be moved from Augusta, Georgia to Lowell, Massachusetts. Herman subsequently pulled out of the bout due to an injury.

== Personal life ==
Herman married Madeleine Atchley in March 2014. They live on a farm and have a son, Leo.

On January 19, 2015, Herman was arrested in the early morning in Indiana, allegedly after leading police on a chase. Herman faces three felony charges, including resisting law enforcement with a vehicle and battery against law enforcement, and a misdemeanor charge of child neglect. His infant child was in the vehicle when he pulled over in the closest safe well lit area.

According to an incident report issued by the Dekalb County Sheriff Department, Herman was speeding on I-69 with no headlights or taillights on. When officers attempted to pull him over, Herman initially refused to pull over before stopping at a gas station, the report states.

According to the report: “David exited his vehicle and approached Officers in an aggressive manner. David was given multiple warnings to get on the ground and failed to comply. David had to be tased in order to be taken into custody. An infant and adult female were also present in the vehicle.”

== Championships and accomplishments ==
- Ultimate Fighting Championship
  - Fight of the Night (One time)
  - UFC.com Awards
    - 2011: Ranked #7 Newcomer of the Year

== Mixed martial arts record ==
Professional record breakdown
28 matches	22 wins	6 losses
By knockout	17	4
By submission	3	1
By decision	2	0
By disqualification	0	1

Res.	Record	Opponent	Method	Event	Date	Round	Time	Location	Notes
Win	22–6	Kalib Starnes	Decision (unanimous)	Titan FC 28: Brilz vs. Davis	May 16, 2014	3	5:00	Newkirk, Oklahoma, United States	
Loss	21–6	Gabriel Gonzaga	KO (punches)	UFC 162	July 6, 2013	1	0:17	Las Vegas, Nevada, United States	
Loss	21–5	Antônio Rodrigo Nogueira	Submission (armbar)	UFC 153	October 13, 2012	2	4:31	Rio de Janeiro, Brazil	Herman tested positive for marijuana.
Loss	21–4	Roy Nelson	KO (punch)	UFC 146	May 26, 2012	1	0:51	Las Vegas, Nevada, United States	
Loss	21–3	Stefan Struve	TKO (punches)	UFC on Fuel TV: Sanchez vs. Ellenberger	February 15, 2012	2	3:52	Omaha, Nebraska, United States	
Win	21–2	John-Olav Einemo	TKO (punches)	UFC 131	June 11, 2011	2	3:19	Vancouver, British Columbia, Canada	Fight of the Night.
Win	20–2	Yoshihiro Nakao	Decision (unanimous)	World Victory Road Presents: Soul of Fight	December 30, 2010	3	5:00	Tokyo, Japan	
Win	19–2	Michal Kita	Submission (omoplata)	Bellator 31	September 30, 2010	1	3:16	Lake Charles, Louisiana, United States	
Loss	18–2	Rameau Thierry Sokoudjou	DQ (illegal knees)	ADFC: Round 1	May 14, 2010	2	N/A	Abu Dhabi, United Arab Emirates	Openweight Grand Prix Quarterfinal.
Win	18–1	Jim York	KO (axe kicks and punches)	World Victory Road Presents: Sengoku 11	November 7, 2009	1	2:25	Tokyo, Japan	
Win	17–1	Don Frye	TKO (punches)	Shark Fights 6: Stars & Stripes	September 12, 2009	1	1:00	Amarillo, Texas, United States	
Win	16–1	Josh Barnes	KO (knee and punches)	Bellator 5	May 1, 2009	1	4:46	Dayton, Ohio, United States	
Loss	15–1	Choi Mu-Bae	TKO (punches)	World Victory Road Presents: Sengoku no Ran 2009	January 4, 2009	2	2:22	Saitama, Japan	
Win	15–0	Chris Guillen	TKO (punches)	KOK: Season's Beatings	November 22, 2008	1	1:32	Austin, Texas, United States	
Win	14–0	Kerry Schall	TKO (knees and punches)	ShoXC 9	October 10, 2008	1	1:06	Hammond, Indiana, United States	
Win	13–0	Ron Waterman	TKO (punches)	EliteXC: Return of the King	June 14, 2008	1	2:19	Honolulu, Hawaii, United States	
Win	12–0	Mario Rinaldi	TKO (knees and punches)	EliteXC: Street Certified	February 16, 2008	3	0:33	Miami, Florida, United States	
Win	11–0	Justin Kuhn	Submission (rear-naked choke)	Maximum Combat	December 8, 2007	1	2:56	United States	
Win	10–0	Chuck Geyer	KO (punch)	LOF 22: Nemesis	November 30, 2007	1	1:31	Indianapolis, Indiana, United States	
Win	9–0	Terry Tucker	KO (punch)	LOF 20: Bitter Rivals	September 28, 2007	1	0:36	Indianapolis, Indiana, United States	
Win	8–0	Jordan Wall	TKO (submission to punches)	Title Fighting Championships	June 30, 2007	1	1:30	Des Moines, Iowa, United States	
Win	7–0	Andre Mussi	TKO (punches)	Fight Night in the Flats III	June 9, 2007	1	3:00	Cleveland, Ohio, United States	
Win	6–0	James Samuels	KO (punch)	LOF 18: Pole Position	May 25, 2007	1	0:18	Indianapolis, Indiana, United States	
Win	5–0	James Ferguson	KO (punch)	LOF 17: Unrivaled	May 19, 2007	1	1:59	Fort Wayne, Indiana, United States	
Win	4–0	Seth Parker	Submission (rear-naked choke)	LOF: Revolution 4	April 13, 2007	1	3:11	Plainfield, Indiana, United States	
Win	3–0	Greg Hammer	TKO (submission to punches)	FSG: Coliseum Carnage	April 8, 2007	1	1:13	Ames, Iowa, United States	
Win	2–0	Jeff Orieze	KO (punch)	LOF: Revolution 2	February 17, 2007	1	4:59	Plainfield, Indiana, United States	
Win	1–0	Mike Cooke	KO (punch)	LOF 12: Black Tie Battles	December 31, 2006	1	1:39	Indianapolis, Indiana, United States	
