= Jim York (fighter) =

New Zealander mixed martial arts fighter

Jim Yorke
- Born: 29 February 1976 (age 50); Invercargill, New Zealand
- Other names: Big
- Nationality: New Zealander
- Height: 6 ft 1 in (185 cm)
- Weight: 265 lb (120 kg; 18 st 13 lb)
- Division: Heavyweight
- Reach: 80.5 in (204 cm)
- Fighting out of: Mermaid Beach, Queensland, Australia
- Team: Five Rings Dojo (2006–present); ShinKali Academy (2004-2012); Integrated Martial Arts Australia (2003-2005); Boonchu Gym (2010)
- Trainer: Fai Falamoe (2004-2012); John Wayne Parr (2004-2005), (2010); Kyle Noke (2003-2005)
- Years active: 2003–present

Mixed martial arts record
- Total: 21
- Wins: 16
- By knockout: 6
- By submission: 9
- By decision: 1
- Losses: 5
- By knockout: 2
- By submission: 2
- By decision: 1

Other information
- Mixed martial arts record from Sherdog

Jim Yorke (born 29 February 1976), known professionally as Jim York, is a New Zealand professional mixed martial artist who has fought for the World Victory Road, Impact FC and King of the Cage promotions.

York is best known for his fights with Japanese firebrand Yoshihiro Nakao and UFC vet Dave Herman. He also fought EliteXC and PRIDE FC veteran James Thompson at World Victory Road Presents: Sengoku 7 winning via knockout.

== Mixed martial arts record ==
Professional record breakdown
21 matches	16 wins	5 losses
By knockout	6	2
By submission	9	2
By decision	1	1
No contests	0	

Res.	Record	Opponent	Method	Event	Date	Round	Time	Location	Notes
Win	16–5	Steven Warby	Decision (unanimous)	Nitro MMA 10	26 October 2013	3	5:00	Logan City, Australia	Won the vacant Nitro MMA Heavyweight Championship.
Loss	15–5	Jeff Monson	Decision (unanimous)	Cage Fighting Championship 21	18 May 2012	3	5:00	Sydney, Australia	
Win	15–4	Lucas Browne	TKO (punches)	XMMA 3	5 November 2010	2	N/A	Sydney, Australia	
Win	14–4	Felise Leniu	Submission (rear-naked choke)	XMMA 2: ANZ vs. USA	31 July 2010	1	1:27	Sydney, Australia	
Win	13–4	Peter Graham	Submission (rear-naked choke)	Impact FC 2	18 July 2010	1	3:44	Sydney, Australia	
Win	12–4	Brandon Cash	TKO (submission to punches)	Cage Fighting Championships 14	5 June 2010	1	4:33	Sydney, Australia	
Loss	11–4	Dave Herman	KO (axe kicks and punches)	World Victory Road Presents: Sengoku 11	7 November 2009	1	2:25	Tokyo, Japan	
Loss	11–3	Antônio Silva	Submission (arm-triangle choke)	World Victory Road Presents: Sengoku 10	23 September 2009	1	3:51	Saitama, Japan	
Win	11–2	James Thompson	KO (punch)	World Victory Road Presents: Sengoku 7	20 March 2009	1	4:33	Tokyo, Japan	
Loss	10–2	Yoshihiro Nakao	KO (punches)	World Victory Road Presents: Sengoku 2	18 May 2008	2	0:46	Tokyo, Japan	
Win	10–1	Iro Zeki	TKO (punches)	MARS 7: Tornado Returns	15 April 2007	1	0:46	Tokyo, Japan	
Win	9–1	Anthony Netzler	KO (punch)	MARS 4: New Deal	26 August 2006	1	1:03	Tokyo, Japan	
Win	8–1	Jun Soo Lim	Submission (neck crank)	MARS World Grand Prix	29 April 2006	1	1:56	Seoul, South Korea	
Win	7–1	Brad Morris	KO (head kick)	KOTC: Gunfather	10 February 2006	3	2:59	Sunshine Coast, Australia	
Win	6–1	Darren Bertoni	TKO (submission to punches)	Dojo KO: First Elimination	7 May 2005	1	N/A	Gold Coast, Australia	
Win	5–1	Mick Cutajar	Submission (verbal)	Warriors Realm 2	10 December 2004	1	0:59	Sunshine Coast, Australia	
Win	4–1	Shane Distant	Submission (kimura)	Spartan Reality Fight 12	27 November 2004	1	1:45	Gold Coast, Australia	
Win	3–1	Gareth Henderson	Submission (rear-naked choke)	Warriors Realm 1	3 September 2004	1	1:48	Sunshine Coast, Australia	
Win	2–1	Sean Heins	TKO (injury)	Spartan Reality Fight 9	3 April 2004	1	0:49	Queensland, Australia	
Win	1–1	Nathan White	Submission (guillotine choke)	Spartan Reality Fight 8	29 November 2003	1	0:57	Gold Coast, Australia	
Loss	0–1	Doug Meijer	Submission (rear-naked choke)	Spartan Reality Fight 7	26 July 2003	2	0:41	Queensland, Australia	
