= James Thompson (fighter) =

English mixed martial arts fighter

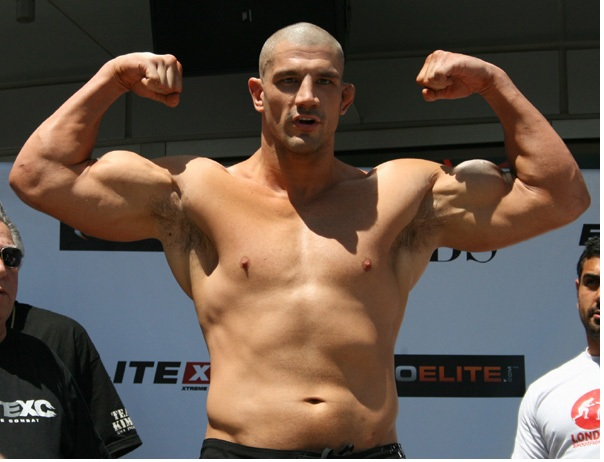
- Thompson at a media event
- Born: 16 December 1978 (age 47); Rochdale, England
- Other names: The Colossus
- Nationality: English
- Height: 6 ft 5 in (196 cm)
- Weight: 266 lb (121 kg; 19 st 0 lb)
- Division: Heavyweight; Super-heavyweight
- Reach: 77 in (196 cm)
- Team: Olympians MMA
- Years active: 2003–2017

Mixed martial arts record
- Total: 39
- Wins: 20
- By knockout: 13
- By submission: 5
- By decision: 2
- Losses: 17
- By knockout: 13
- By submission: 3
- By decision: 1
- No contests: 2

Other information
- Mixed martial arts record from Sherdog

James Thompson (born 16 December 1978) is an English former professional mixed martial artist who competed in the heavyweight division. A seasoned professional competitor since 2003, Thompson has also formerly competed for PRIDE FC, Bellator MMA, Cage Rage, EliteXC, Sengoku, DREAM, KSW, Rizin, and the SFL. He last fought for Bellator in 2017.

== Background ==
Born in England, Thompson grew up in Rochdale playing rugby league. Widely considered to be a talented player, at one point in time he did consider pursuing a professional career in rugby. Ultimately, he ended up working as debt collector and nightclub bouncer, whilst also competing in amateur bodybuilding. Thompson then took up the sport of wrestling and competed in several matches before eventually seeing an MMA bout featuring Don Frye (whom he would later fight and beat at PRIDE 34: Kamikaze), which ultimately inspired him to pursue a career in MMA.

== Mixed martial arts career ==
=== Early career ===
Thompson began his mixed martial arts career fighting in the British promotion Ultimate Combat (UC). He developed a rivalry with Mark "The Shark" Goddard after their bout in Ultimate Combat 6: Battle in the Cage. Thompson won the bout by referee stoppage, but Goddard disputed the result, saying that Thompson had tapped earlier to one of his armbar attempts. A rematch at Ultimate Combat 8: Retribution resulted in an 18-second knockout victory for Thompson. After five straight victories, he faced his first loss to Georgian Tengiz Tedoradze at Ultimate Combat X. Tedoradze managed to stop Thompson's initial charge and won by doctor stoppage after the second round. Thompson bounced back with a UC Championship bout against Ultimate Fighting Championship (UFC) veteran Dan Severn at Ultimate Combat 11: Eyes of the Beast.

=== PRIDE ===
After defeating Severn, Thompson made his PRIDE Fighting Championship debut at PRIDE 28 to face Alexander Emelianenko at PRIDE 28: High Octane. Despite losing the fight in only eleven seconds, he remained with the organisation, earning quick victories over Henry Armstrong Miller and Giant Silva. Thompson became known to Pride fans for his penchant for rushing at opponents at the opening bell, which became known as 'Gong and Dash'. During this time, Thompson alternated appearances in Japan with fights in British organisations such as Cage Rage.

Thompson's career took a downturn with three consecutive losses to Kazuyuki Fujita, Rob Broughton and Jon Olav Einemo. However, he followed up with an upset victory over Olympic judo gold medalist Hidehiko Yoshida at PRIDE Shockwave 2006. He next suffered a quick KO at the hands of super heavyweight boxer Eric 'Butterbean' Esch at Cage Rage 20. In his final appearance in Pride, Thompson dominated against UFC veteran Don Frye to a first round stoppage at PRIDE 34. Thompson followed up with his final appearance in Cage Rage, losing to Neil "Goliath" Grove by knockout in just 10 seconds. Thompson cited a lack of quality heavyweight training partners for his poor performances, and switched training camps to join Randy Couture's Xtreme Couture.

=== EliteXC ===
Thompson made his EliteXC debut against undefeated 8-0 fighter Brett Rogers at the EliteXC: Street Certified on 16 February 2008. Rogers knocked Thompson out in the first round. Despite this loss, Thompson followed up with a headlining appearance at EliteXC: Primetime against streetfighter Kimbo Slice. Entering the fight with a considerably swollen cauliflower ear, Thompson managed to control the first two rounds with effective ground and pound. However, both fighters came into the third round substantially winded. Slice landed several unanswered blows to Thompson's face whilst on his feet, one of which burst his cauliflower ear, prompting the referee to stop the fight and declare a TKO in Slice's favour.

=== Strike Box/Titans Fighting incident ===
On 6 February 2009, Thompson fought Steve Bossé at Strike Box/Titans Fighting's inaugural event in Quebec, Canada. The event was originally scheduled to be under Strike Box's own rules where only boxing, takedowns and standing submissions were allowed, but the rules were not accepted by the province's athletic commission in time for the event. It was therefore conducted under MMA rules instead. Before the event some fighters agreed to fight under Strike Box's proposed rules as a gentleman's agreement, though the referee in charge would not have any choice but to allow ground fighting were it to happen. Thompson, who later claimed to be unaware of the agreement, proceeded to take down, mount and ground and pound Bosse - as allowed under MMA rules - after Bosse went for a standing guillotine choke at the start of the fight. This caused the audience to boo Thompson and the referee, unaware of that the fight was being conducted under MMA rules. Beer cans and eventually chairs were then thrown into the ring, prompting referee Yves Lavigne to stop the match. Although it was originally declared a no contest the fight and its result doesn't appear on either fighter's official fight records.

=== Sengoku ===
Thompson's fought on 20 March at Sengoku 7 against New Zealand fighter Jim York, which he lost by KO.

=== DREAM ===
Thompson lost a fight with Alistair Overeem on 25 October 2009 at Dream 12

=== Strikeforce ===
Thompson revealed at the Dream 12 press conference that he had three more fights for his Strikeforce contract.

=== ZT Fight Night: The Tournament ===
Thompson competed in the ZT Fight Night Tournament for £10,000 along with 7 other fighters on 30 January 2010. He avenged his first career loss against Tengiz Tedoradze in the quarterfinals, his first win in nearly three years, breaking a five-loss streak. He was then knocked out by the eventual tournament winner, Rob Broughton.

=== DREAM return ===
Rumours that Thompson could face Ikuhisa Minowa at DREAM 16 surfaced. However it was later revealed that Minowa would face Satoshi Ishii at DREAM 16. Thompsony instead fought DEEP veteran Yusuke Kawaguchi and lost via a controversial Split Decision. Many believed the two majority decision judges were biased towards the Japanese home country fighter after Thompson retained top position and did much more damage at the end of the first and throughout the second round.

=== Konfrontacja Sztuk Walki ===
Thompson fought five-time "World’s Strongest Man" Mariusz Pudzianowski at KSW XVI on 21 May 2011. He won the fight via submission in the second round.

In the rematch at KSW XVII, Thompson lost a controversial decision. After the fight, he launched a profane verbal assault directed at the promotion. Two days later the promotion changed the result to a No Contest, claiming an error in scorecard tallying. Thompson, however, has not participated in any subsequent KSW events.

=== Super Fight League ===
Thompson fought in the main event of the Super Fight League's inaugural event, SFL 1, against Bob Sapp. He won the fight when Sapp injured his leg as he was being taken down by Thompson, forcing him to tap out to the injury.

He next competed at Super Fight League 3 against Bobby Lashley. The outcome was yet another close and controversial decision, this time going unanimously in Thompson's favour, giving him his first winning streak since 2005.

=== UXC ===
Thompson returned to action once his orbital bone had healed from his previous war with Lashley on 1 March 2014 against UFC veteran Colin Robinson, as part of the UXC 2 card at the Odyssey Arena, Northern Ireland. He won via arm triangle choke in the second round.

=== Bellator MMA ===
It was announced on 23 May that Thompson had been signed by Bellator MMA and would make his promotional debut against Eric Prindle in the headlining bout of Bellator 121 on 6 June 2014. Thompson dominated Prindle and won by TKO in the first round at 1:55 minutes.

Thompson was expected to face UFC veteran Houston Alexander in the co-main event on 17 October 2014 at Bellator 129. However, on 10 October 2014 it was announced that Thompson was pulled from the fight due to injury.

Thompson was scheduled to face Bobby Lashley in a rematch at Bellator 134 on 27 February 2015. However, Lashley pulled out of the fight due to injury. The fight was rescheduled for 19 June 2015 at Bellator 138. In early June, it was revealed that Dan Charles would instead face Lashley at the event due to an injury sustained by Thompson.

The rematch with Lashley eventually took place on 6 November 2015 at Bellator 145. Thompson lost the fight via TKO in the first round.

In April 2016, Bellator President Scott Coker announced on ESPN’s SportsCenter that Thompson would have a rematch against Kimbo Slice in the main event of Bellator 158, which would take place on 16 July 2016 at London’s O2 Arena. Slice died unexpectedly on 6 June 2016.

=== Rizin Fighting Federation ===
In his debut for the Rizin Fighting Federation, Thompson faced Tsuyoshi Kohsaka on 29 December 2015. He lost the fight via TKO in the second round.

=== Bellator MMA ===
After two years hiatus, Thompson faced Phil De Fries on Bellator 191 on 15 December 2017. He lost the fight via a submission in round one.

Thompson was suspended for one year by the Mohegan Tribe Department of Athletic Regulations and fined two thousands dollars for testing positive from a in competition sample collected for steroid dirostanolone in competition at Bellator 191.

== Championships and accomplishments ==
- Ultimate Combat
  - Ultimate Combat Heavyweight Championship (1 time)
- Underdog Xtreme Championships
  - UXC British Heavyweight Championship (1 time)

== Film ==
In April 2012, Thompson was cast for the role of The Berserker in Outpost: Rise of the Spetsnaz.

== Mixed martial arts record ==
Professional record breakdown
39 matches	20 wins	17 losses
By knockout	13	13
By submission	5	3
By decision	2	1
No contests	2	

Res.	Record	Opponent	Method	Event	Date	Round	Time	Location	Notes
Loss	20–17 (2)	Phil De Fries	Submission (guillotine choke)	Bellator 191	15 December 2017	1	1:33	Newcastle, England	
Loss	20–16 (2)	Tsuyoshi Kosaka	TKO (punches)	Rizin Fighting Federation 1: Day 1	29 December 2015	2	1:58	Saitama, Japan	
Loss	20–15 (2)	Bobby Lashley	TKO (punches)	Bellator 145	6 November 2015	1	0:54	St. Louis, Missouri, United States	
Win	20–14 (2)	Eric Prindle	TKO (punches)	Bellator 121	6 June 2014	1	1:55	Thackerville, Oklahoma, United States	
Win	19–14 (2)	Colin Robinson	Submission (arm-triangle choke)	Underdog Xtreme Championships 2	1 March 2014	2	2:47	Belfast, Northern Ireland	Won the UXC British Heavyweight Championship.
Win	18–14 (2)	Bobby Lashley	Decision (unanimous)	Super Fight League 3: Lashley vs. Thompson	6 May 2012	3	5:00	Delhi, India	
Win	17–14 (2)	Bob Sapp	TKO (leg injury)	Super Fight League 1: Thompson vs. Sapp	11 March 2012	1	3:17	Mumbai, India	
NC	16–14 (2)	Mariusz Pudzianowski	No Contest (overturned)	KSW 17: Revenge	26 November 2011	2	5:00	Łódź, Poland	Original decision loss; result overturned due to a judging error.
Win	16–14	Mariusz Pudzianowski	Submission (arm-triangle choke)	KSW 16: Khalidov vs. Lindland	21 May 2011	2	1:06	Gdańsk, Poland	
Loss	15–14	Yusuke Kawaguchi	Decision (split)	DREAM 16	25 September 2010	2	5:00	Nagoya, Japan	Super Heavyweight bout.
Loss	15–13	Miodrag Petkovic	KO (punch)	Millennium Fight Challenge 4	4 June 2010	1	1:01	Split, Croatia	
Loss	15–12	Rob Broughton	KO (punch)	ZT Fight Night: Heavyweights Collide	30 January 2010	2	2:28	Hove, England	
Win	15–11	Tengiz Tedoradze	TKO (punches)	ZT Fight Night: Heavyweights Collide	30 January 2010	2	2:55	Hove, England	
Loss	14–11	Alistair Overeem	Submission (standing guillotine choke)	Dream 12	25 October 2009	1	0:33	Osaka, Japan	
Loss	14–10	Jim York	KO (punch)	World Victory Road Presents: Sengoku 7	20 March 2009	1	4:33	Tokyo, Japan	
NC	14–8 (1)	Steve Bossé	No Contest	Titans Fighting	6 February 2009	N/A	N/A	Montreal, Quebec, Canada	Originally a special rules bout (StrikeBox), but was forced by commission to fight under MMA rules. The bout ended in a no contest when beer cans and chairs began to be thrown into the ring.
Loss	14–9 (1)	Kimbo Slice	TKO (punches)	EliteXC: Primetime	31 May 2008	3	0:38	Newark, New Jersey, United States	
Loss	14–8	Brett Rogers	KO (punches)	EliteXC: Street Certified	16 February 2008	1	2:24	Miami, Florida, United States	
Loss	14–7	Neil Grove	KO (punch)	Cage Rage 22	14 July 2007	1	0:10	London, England	
Win	14–6	Don Frye	TKO (punches)	PRIDE 34	8 April 2007	1	6:23	Saitama, Japan	
Loss	13–6	Butterbean	KO (punches)	Cage Rage 20	10 February 2007	1	0:43	London, England	
Win	13–5	Hidehiko Yoshida	TKO (punches)	PRIDE: Shockwave 2006	31 December 2006	1	7:50	Saitama, Japan	
Loss	12–5	John-Olav Einemo	Submission (armbar)	2H2H: Pride & Honor	12 November 2006	1	4:18	Netherlands	
Loss	12–4	Rob Broughton	KO (punches)	Cage Rage 17	1 July 2006	3	5:00	London, England	
Loss	12–3	Kazuyuki Fujita	KO (punch)	PRIDE: Total Elimination Absolute	5 May 2006	1	8:25	Osaka, Japan	2006 Pride Heavyweight Grand Prix Opening Round.
Win	12–2	Giant Silva	TKO (soccer kicks)	PRIDE: Shockwave 2005	31 December 2005	1	1:28	Saitama, Japan	
Win	11–2	Alexandru Lungu	TKO (knees and punches)	PRIDE 30	23 October 2005	1	2:13	Saitama, Japan	
Win	10–2	Andy Costello	TKO (punches)	Cage Rage 13	10 September 2005	1	2:33	London, England	
Win	9–2	Autimio Antonia	KO (punch)	Urban Destruction 2	30 July 2005	1	0:54	Bristol, England	
Win	8–2	Henry Armstrong Miller	KO (punch)	PRIDE: Bushido 8	17 July 2005	1	1:21	Nagoya, Japan	
Win	7–2	Nikolajus Cilkinas	TKO (punches)	Urban Destruction 1	10 April 2005	1	1:04	England	
Loss	6–2	Alexander Emelianenko	KO (punch)	PRIDE 28	31 October 2004	1	0:11	Saitama, Japan	
Win	6–1	Dan Severn	Decision (unanimous)	UC 11: Wrath of the Beast	12 September 2004	5	5:00	Bristol, England	Won the Ultimate Combat Heavyweight Championship.
Loss	5–1	Tengiz Tedoradze	TKO (referee stoppage)	Ultimate Combat X	20 June 2004	2	5:00	England	
Win	5–0	Aaron Marsa	Submission (neck injury)	UC 9: Rebellion	28 March 2004	1	0:20	Bristol, England	
Win	4–0	Marc Goddard	KO (punches)	UC 8: Retribution	30 November 2003	1	0:18	Chippenham, England	
Win	3–0	Richie Cranny	Submission (arm-triangle choke)	UC 7: World Domination	6 September 2003	1	1:34	Chippenham, England	
Win	2–0	Marc Goddard	TKO (submission to punches)	UC 6: Battle in the Cage	14 June 2003	2	0:47	Chippenham, England	
Win	1–0	Will Elworthy	Submission (forearm choke)	Ground & Pound 2	25 January 2003	1	4:22	England	

== See also ==
- List of male mixed martial artists
