= Bob Sapp =

American MMA fighter, wrestler, actor (b. 1973)

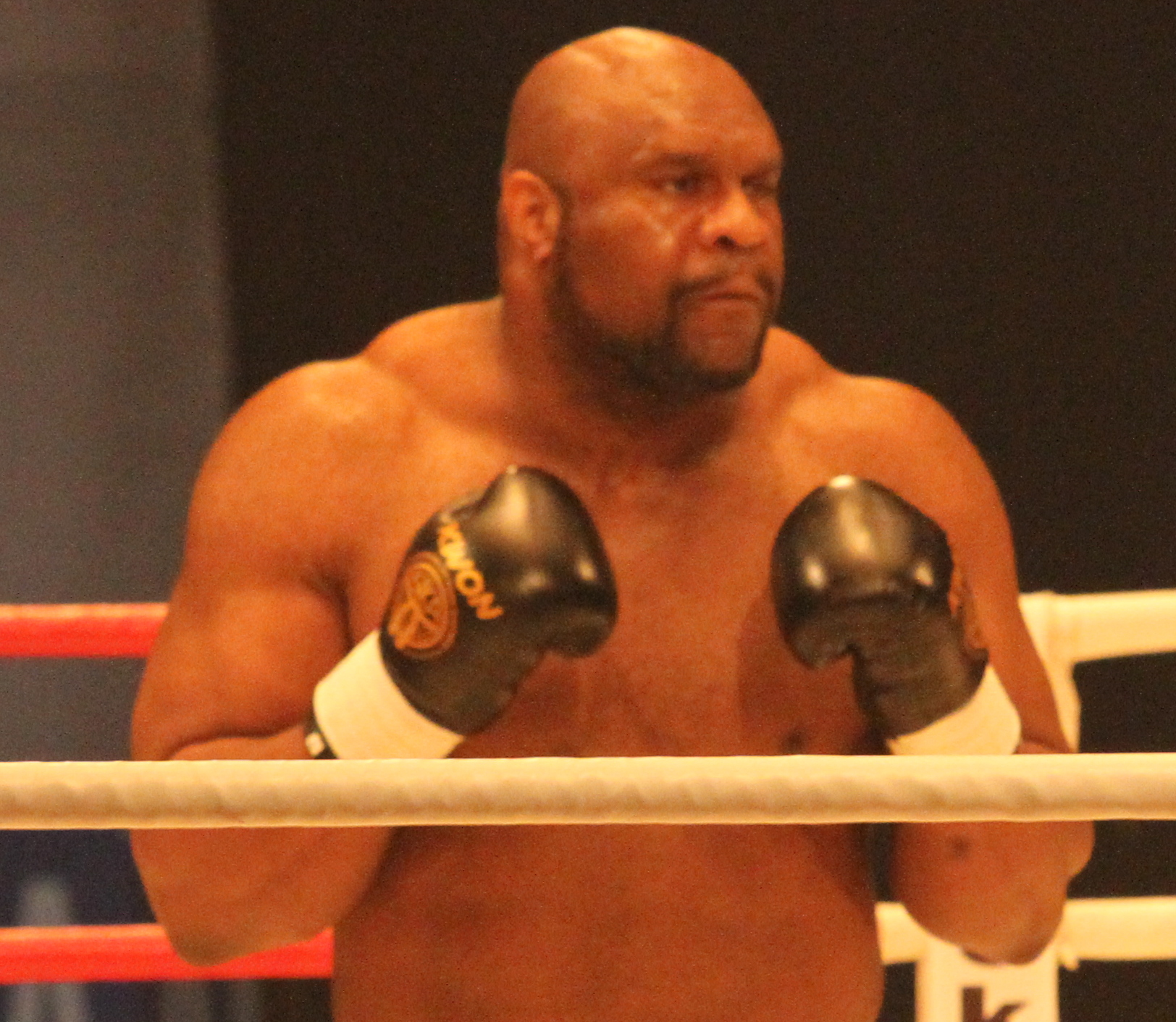
- Sapp in 2011
- Born: Robert Malcolm Sapp; September 22, 1973 (age 53); Colorado Springs, Colorado, U.S.
- Other names: The Beast
- Height: 6 ft 5 in (196 cm)
- Weight: 329 lb (149 kg; 23 st 7 lb)
- Division: Super Heavyweight
- Reach: 82 in (210 cm)
- Style: Kickboxing
- Fighting out of: Seattle, Washington, U.S.
- Team: Team Beast; BodyShop MMA & Fitness
- Teachers: Maurice Smith; Josh Barnett; Matt Hume
- Trainer: Prince Amir
- Years active: 2002–2014, 2016–2018

Kickboxing record
- Total: 31
- Wins: 12
- By knockout: 9
- Losses: 19
- By knockout: 12

Mixed martial arts record
- Total: 32
- Wins: 12
- By knockout: 8
- By submission: 3
- By decision: 1
- Losses: 20
- By knockout: 15
- By submission: 4
- By disqualification: 1

Other information
- Mixed martial arts record from Sherdog
- Football career

No. 78
- Position: Guard

Personal information
- Listed height: 6 ft 4 in (1.93 m)
- Listed weight: 319 lb (145 kg)

Career information
- College: Washington
- NFL draft: 1997: 3rd round, 69th overall pick

Career history
- Chicago Bears (1997)*; Minnesota Vikings (1997–1998)
- * Offseason or practice squad member only

Awards and highlights
- Morris Trophy (1996)

Career NFL statistics
- Games played: 1
- Stats at Pro Football Reference
- Last updated on: November 17, 2013

Robert Malcolm Sapp (born September 22, 1973) is an American bodybuilder and entertainer, and former martial artist, professional wrestler, actor, and football player. He is both primarily known for his mixed martial arts career, as well as his work as a gaijin tarento, or foreign-born entertainer, in Japan. Sapp has a combined fight record of 24–39–1, mostly fighting in Japan. He is well known in Japan, where he has appeared in numerous commercials, television programs, and various other media, and has released a music CD, Sapp Time (2003).

Sapp played college football as a guard for the Washington Huskies with whom he won the Morris Trophy. He was selected in the third round of the 1997 NFL draft by the Chicago Bears with whom he played for one season, seeing no game action, before playing with the Minnesota Vikings for another two seasons, only playing in one game. He later began a career in professional wrestling before branching out into mixed martial arts and kickboxing, where he initially enjoyed significant success and popularity before eventually developing a reputation as a tomato can.

== American football career ==
Sapp began his athletic career in high school playing football at Mitchell High School in Colorado Springs, Colorado. He received a football scholarship to the University of Washington, where he won the Morris Award in 1996. He took part in "The Whammy in Miami", the Washington Huskies' upset win over the Miami Hurricanes that broke the latter's 58 game home winning streak.

Sapp was drafted by the Chicago Bears in the third round (69th overall) of the 1997 NFL draft. He signed with the Minnesota Vikings after being released by the Bears. However, his career took a hit after he was suspended by the NFL in 1998 for steroid abuse. He spent two seasons with the Vikings and only played in one game. In 2013 fan poll, he was included in a list of the top five worst Chicago Bears draft picks picks.

Afterwards, Sapp was left in poverty after being defrauded by his economic advisor, and resorted to working at a funeral home moving coffins to make a living. He eventually decided to pursue a career in professional wrestling on the advice of his friend Mike Morris, who saw a chance for Sapp on it.

== Professional wrestling ==
=== Early career (2000–2002) ===
Bob Sapp's professional wrestling career started in NWA Wildside in 2000, before he was quickly contracted by World Championship Wrestling (WCW) as a developmental wrestler. There he started honing his "The Beast" persona, which at this stage was a villainous, feral tarzan-like gimmick, but his development was cut short when the company was bought out by the World Wrestling Federation (WWF). He left professional wrestling for many years, attracted instead to a fighting career under the training of fellow WCW developmental wrestler Sam Greco.

=== New Japan Pro-Wrestling and All Japan Pro Wrestling (2002–2005) ===
In 2002, riding his success in K-1, Sapp made his professional wrestling debut for New Japan Pro-Wrestling (NJPW). Introduced as a member of chairman Antonio Inoki's army of fighters, Sapp replaced an injured Yoshihiro Takayama in his October 14 match against Manabu Nakanishi. The two exchanged taunts and attacks on the weeks leading to the match, with Sapp ultimately winning after executing his finishing move, the Beast Bomb, on the ringside, where he left Nakanishi to be counted out. This victory led to many other wrestlers to suggest to take their chance against Sapp, among them Yuji Nagata and Takayama himself, but the American refrained from participating.

Sapp balanced his NJPW appearances with similar ventures in All Japan Pro Wrestling, where he intruded to challenge Bill Goldberg and Keiji Mutoh. He first appeared in Wrestle-1, a copromotion between K-1 and AJPW, where he faced Mutoh's alter ego The Great Muta in November 2002. Sapp defeated him after pinning him with a diving headbutt. He returned to the event in January 2003, where he wrestled his kickboxing rival Ernesto Hoost, yet this time Sapp lost after Hoost's cornerman Johann Vos intervened in the bout.

In October 2003, Sapp returned to NJPW, taking part again of Inoki's MMA army along with Takayama, Kazuyuki Fujita, Shinsuke Nakamura and Minoru Suzuki to face Nakanishi, Nagata, Hiroshi Tanahashi, Hiroyoshi Tenzan and Seiji Sakaguchi. He followed by some team matches along with Nakamura and AJPW's Keiji Mutoh, but his main push would come in his singles career. On March 28, 2004, Sapp defeated Kensuke Sasaki to win the IWGP Heavyweight Championship, becoming the first (and only, to date) African-American to hold the title. After successfully defending the title against Shinsuke Nakamura on May 3 at Nexess, Sapp forfeited the title due to having lost to Kazuyuki Fujita in a mixed martial arts fight.

In 2005, Sapp returned to Wrestle-1, taking part on its inaugural Grand Prix tournament and beating Giant Bernard and Jun Akiyama in road to the finals. However, Wrestle-1 was discontinued before the tournament could be finished.

=== Hustle (2007–2008) ===
On October 16, 2007, Sapp made a surprise appearance at Hustle's Korakuen Hall event, attacking Razor Ramon HG and his partner Wataru Sakata. Sapp aligned himself with Generalissimo Takada's villainous Monster Army. After defeating Razor Ramon RG in his debut match for the company, it was announced that he would wrestle at the Hustlemania Yokohama Arena event. His opponent was later confirmed to be Razor Ramon HG, whom Sapp went on to defeat.

Sapp was later put into a tag team with fellow superheavyweight Monster Bono, but a falling out between the two due to miscommunications in the ring led Sapp to attack Bono with a chair. Sapp and Bono entered a short feud, which culminated with the American's victory and Bono's expulsion from the Monster Army. Sapp then started teaming up with Commander An Jo, eventually entering another feud with Hustle Army member Wataru Sakata. Sapp was defeated by him, breaking his winning streak in professional wrestling. He would try to bounce back by participating in the Hustle Grand Prix 2008, but he was shockingly eliminated by Osaka Pro Wrestling representative Zeus after having beaten Tiger Jeet Singh. After another short rivalry with Genichiro Tenryu, Sapp was defeated in a rematch against Bono as his last appearance for Hustle.

=== Independent circuit (2008–2012) ===
In 2008, Sapp began to participate in WWA, a pro wrestling organization in South Korea. On October 26, 2009, Sapp captured the WWA Heavyweight title by defeating Lee Wang-pyo. On July 24, 2011, Sapp made his debut for Dramatic Dream Team (DDT) at Ryōgoku Peter Pan 2011, using a "Beast will fight for money" gimmick. In a comedy match, he was defeated by Danshoku Dino, a wrestler with a homosexual character, being pinned after a kiss and a Gaydo Clutch.

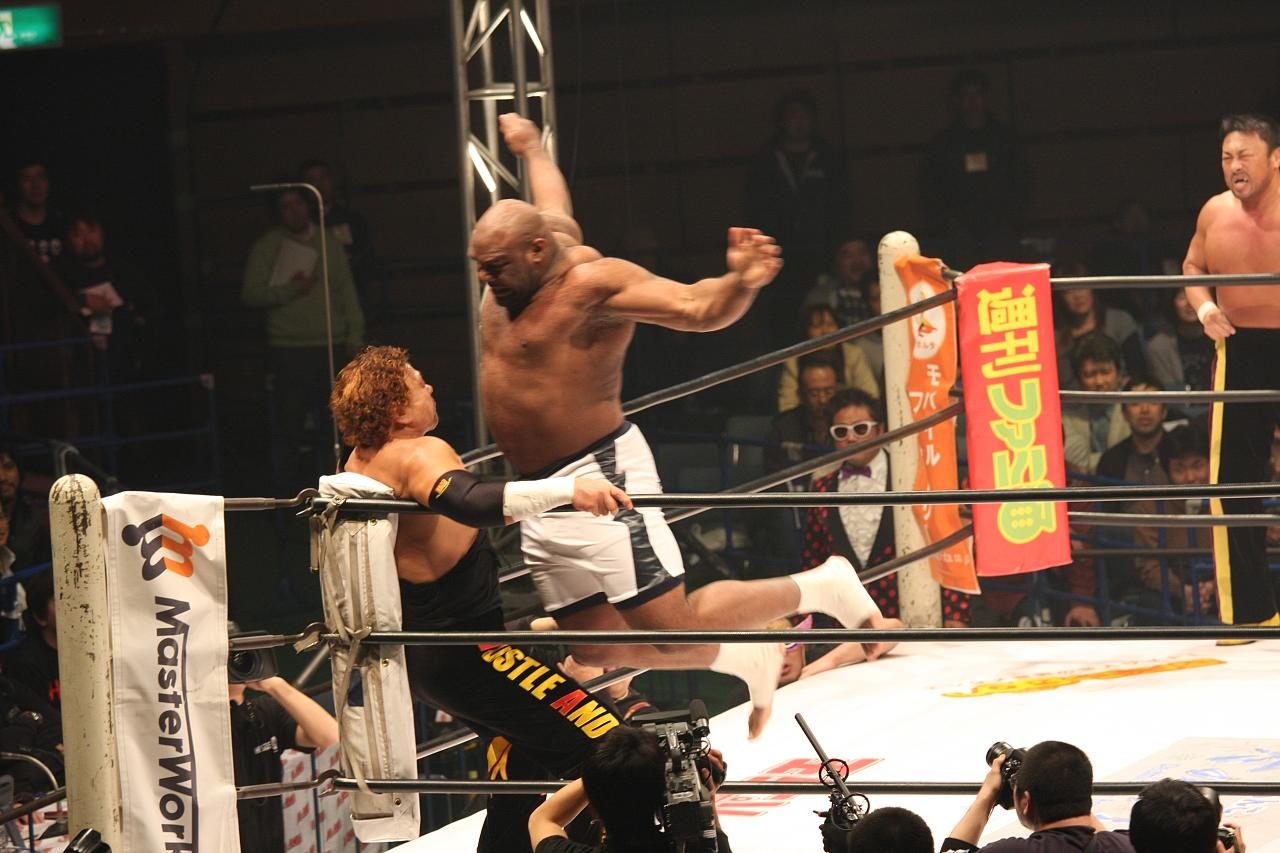
Sapp executing a corner body avalanche on Genichiro Tenryu.

=== Return to New Japan Pro-Wrestling (2012–2013) ===
At a NJPW event on December 20, 2012, Toru Yano announced that Sapp would represent the villainous Chaos stable on January 4, 2013, at Wrestle Kingdom 7 in Tokyo Dome. At the event, Sapp teamed with Yano, Takashi Iizuka and Yujiro Takahashi in an eight-man tag team match, where they were defeated by Akebono, Manabu Nakanishi, MVP and Strong Man. Sapp made another appearance for New Japan on April 7, 2013, at Invasion Attack, where he and Chaos stablemates Takashi Iizuka, Tomohiro Ishii and Yoshi-Hashi were defeated by Akebono, Hiroyoshi Tenzan, Manabu Nakanishi and Super Strong Machine in another eight-man tag team match.

=== Wrestle-1 (2013) ===
On September 8, Sapp took part in the Wrestle-1 promotion's inaugural event, teaming with Keiji Mutoh in a main event tag team match, where they defeated René Duprée and Zodiac.

=== Inoki Genome Federation (2009–2014) ===
In 2009, he would compete in the Inoki Genome Federation (IGF). His last match was a lost to Aztecaser on December 31, 2014.

=== Later career (2014–2017) ===
After leaving IGF, Sapp continued to wrestle in Japan until 2017.

== Kickboxing and mixed martial arts career ==
In 2000, after Sapp was released from WCW, he was picked up by FX for its amateur boxing show The Toughman Competition. Sapp was pitted against William "The Refrigerator" Perry as a pro wrestling representative and, despite not having any prior boxing experience, won by knocking out Perry in round 2. Then Sapp's friend and trainer Sam Greco showed his match to Kazuyoshi Ishii, chairman of Japanese kickboxing promotion K-1. Ishii then invited Sapp to Japan in order to start a career in the ring, seeing a combination of great potential and great marketability in him. After training for six months in United States in the AMC Pankration and Team Quest gyms, he would be sent to mixed martial arts company Pride Fighting Championship, which had expressed interest on him too, in order to make his professional debut first under such rules. Sapp competed under both rulesets indistinctly for the rest of his career, usually for the promotion K-1.

=== K-1 and Japanese promotions ===
==== 2002 ====
After arriving to Japan, Sapp debuted in Pride as a K-1 representative against former professional wrestler and longtime Fighting Network RINGS competitor Yoshihisa Yamamoto, who he finished by TKO at 2:44 of the first round by way of wild hooks. The bout, which attracted 10 million viewers, quickly turned Sapp into a fan favorite due to his size, charisma and aggression, and prepared him for his kickboxing debut against Tsuyoshi Nakasako a month later. Sapp lost by disqualification in 1:30 when he pushed Nakasako to the corner, threw him to the ground and rained illegal strikes on him until being restrained by ring crew. The act caused a brawl in the ring when the cornermen jumped in, but Sapp was surprisingly received with cheers from the crowd. He became an overnight sensation in Japan afterwards, appearing on numerous television shows and advertisements and becoming K-1's most popular fighter. Sapp contributed by creating an outrageous public persona, nicknamed "The Beast", under which he played an unhinged, loudmouthed, yet also humorous version of himself.

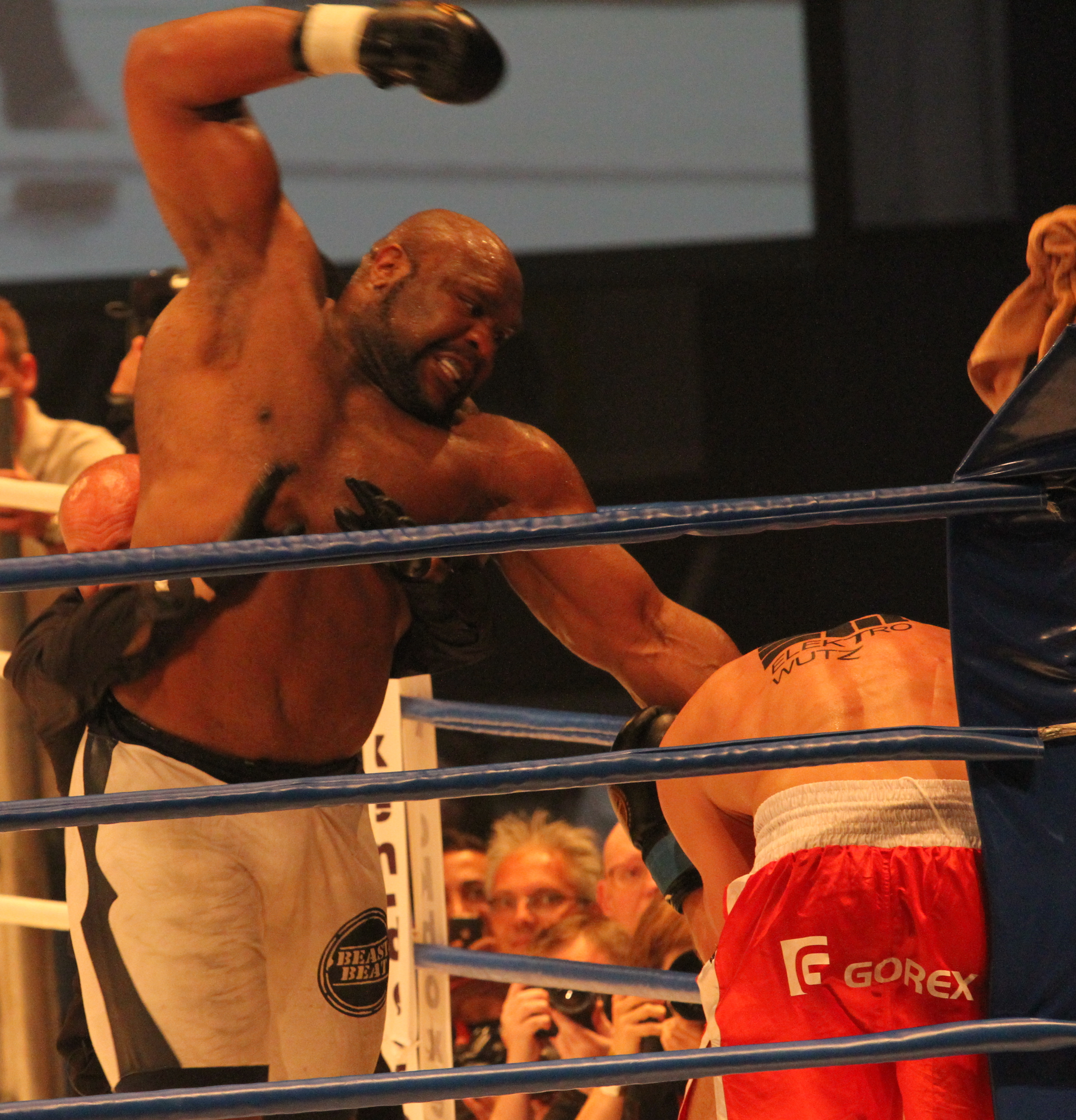
Sapp's characteristic fighting style, based on aggression and strength.

Sapp's second Pride match was against two-time RINGS Openweight Champion Kiyoshi Tamura. Though Tamura was a highly respected fighter who held wins over the likes of Pat Miletich, Jeremy Horn and Renzo Gracie, he was giving up 150 lbs to his foe and was quickly overwhelmed by the much larger American, succumbing to strikes just 11 seconds into the bout.

In a show held by both Pride and K-1 called "Dynamite", Sapp faced then Pride champion Antônio Rodrigo Nogueira. The latter had originally been slated for a kickboxing bout against K-1 fighter Mark Hunt, but negotiations fell out, as Nogueira had proposed to fight two separate bouts under mixed martial arts and kickboxing rules respectively, which was rejected by Hunt. The Pride champion then accepted to fight Sapp as a replacement, noting that "nobody wanted to fight Sapp, and some other Pride fighters already had their fights matched." Due to the usual size disparity, this time amounting to 127 pounds, Nogueira accepted a special rule to ban knee strikes on the ground, making it a more even affair. Despite this, the match would quickly become a memorable battle of strength against technique.

Sapp opened the match almost finishing Nogueira in mere seconds, as the latter charged with a takedown only to be lifted and slammed onto his head in a piledriver. Sapp looked to repeat the technique, but Nogueira managed to avoid it and momentarily ready Sapp for an unsuccessful armbar. Taking his turn again, Sapp started punishing him with ground and pound through the Brazilian's guard, nullifying his armlocks by sheer strength and landing powerbombs every time Nogueira tried his trademark triangle choke. The bout continued this way, with Nogueira trying fruitless submissions from the bottom while Sapp grinded him with heavy blows, until action finally slowed down into the second round, as Sapp was unaccustomed to fight for so long. Nogueira, who had endured the beating through impressive will and looked "only half-conscious" according to reviewers, finally pulled a tired Sapp down and mounted him. The Brazilian seized an armbar and, although Sapp blocked it, he had no left energy to resist and had to concede the hold and the match.

The fight received critical acclaim by reviewers, with website Ichiban Puroresu calling it "an awesome fight" and "better drama than any fight this year," Keith Vargo commenting that "victory and defeat were changing sides so fast that either man could have won any moment," and Scott Newman opining it was "probably the best heavyweight fight [he had] ever seen in fact." Mirko Cro Cop, who would defeat Sapp in K-1, was quoted as, "It was the craziest fight I've ever seen. I couldn't believe that 'Minotauro' was able to survive all the things that happened to him. He almost broke his spine. Unbelievable." Sapp himself was praised by his performance, to the extent Pride commentators Stephen Quadros and Bas Rutten speculating he could become a major fighter with only more training. He actually expressed desire for a rematch, but Nogueira, who came from the fight with both cheekbones broken, actively rejected it.

Sapp stated interest in fighting Fedor Emelianenko after he won the Pride Heavyweight Championship from Nogueira, which Emelianenko accepted, though joking he would have to gain 70 kg to face Sapp in even terms. Nothing of this materialized, and Sapp would never again compete in Pride, instead focusing his attention on K-1. When Sapp returned to the kickboxing ring the next month, this time against Cyril Abidi and with K-1 chairman Kazuyoshi Ishii as a special referee, he scored his first kickboxing victory, cornering his opponent and unloading punches and hammerfists on him for the KO.

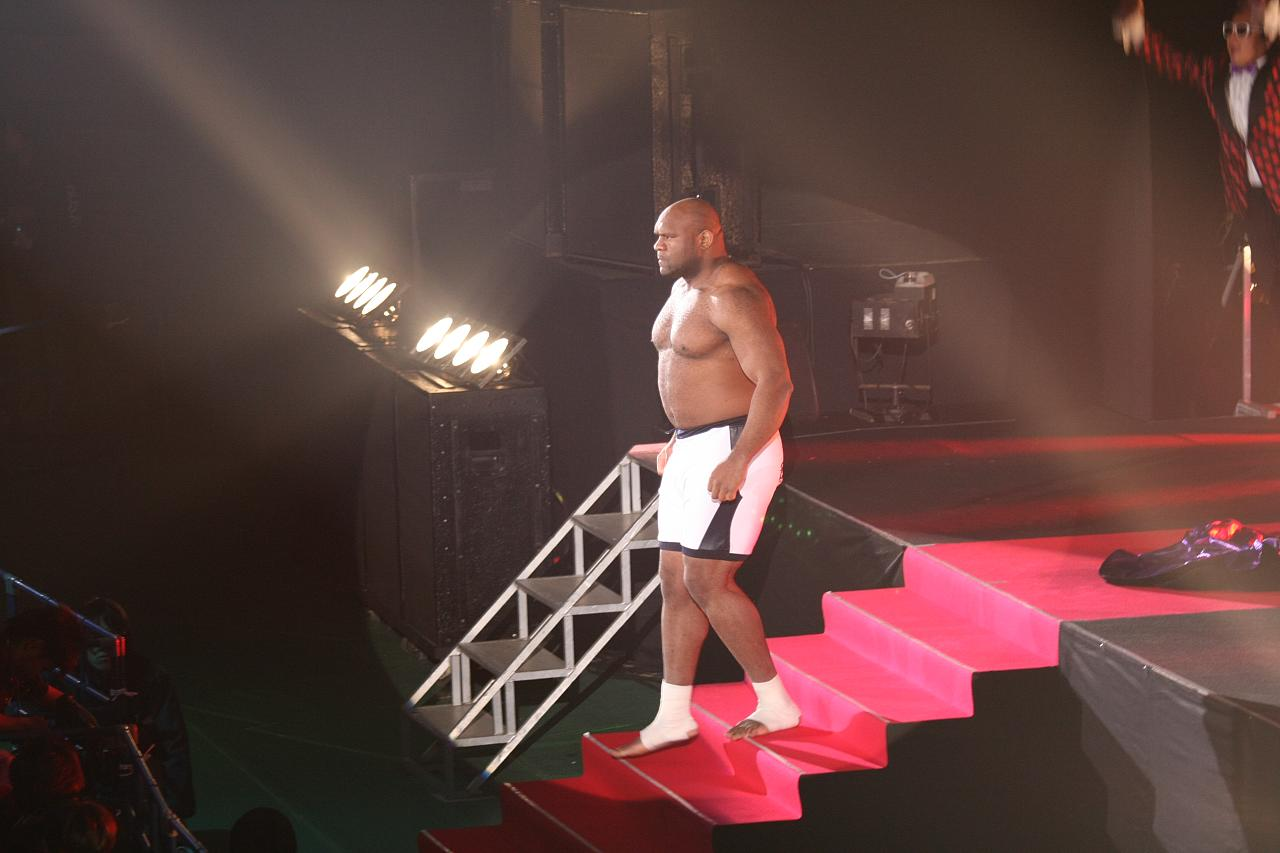
Sapp entering the arena in Japan.

His greatest in-ring success, though, would come in his match over K-1 legend Ernesto Hoost. They first met at the K-1 World Grand Prix 2002 Final Elimination on October 5, 2002, where Sapp replaced an injured Cro Cop in his bout against Hoost. The latter was expected to win thanks to his experience and technical superiority despite being outweighed by over 100 pounds, but Sapp claimed he would not need more than the first round to defeat Hoost, thus setting up an anticipated matchup. Once the fight came around, all while under a television viewership of 19.8%, Sapp surprised the crowd when he started dominating Hoost effectively through his already known charging strategy. By pushing Hoost against the ring's corners and unloading punches there with all of his strength, Sapp controlled the entire the first round, and still landed controversially three more punches after the bell sounded. After the round, the ring doctor declared Hoost was unable to continue due to cuts, and Sapp was ultimately deemed winner while Hoost collapsed visibly in his corner, fulfilling his previous prediction.

His solid victory over Hoost, much like his dominant effort with Nogueira, proved that the trust put on Sapp by K-1 executives had not been in vain. Sapp would compare his situation to "taking someone off the streets and throwing him into the ring with Mike Tyson and then watching that person win," given how much he had accomplished with so little experience and training. According to future adversary Mirko Cro Cop, with Sapp's reputation, many potential opponents were scared to fight him, both in Pride and K-1. However, Hoost was reportedly discontent with the match's refereeing, citing the illegalities committed by Sapp, and expressed desire for a rematch.

Two months later, Sapp was slated to fight Semmy Schilt at K-1 World Grand Prix 2002 Final quarter-finals, but an injury suffered by the latter granted Hoost his second chance as a replacement. Sapp declared he would finish him in one round again. The bout would be a more even affair, however, as although Sapp looked to use his familiar strategy, this time Hoost scored a knockdown through two well placed body blows and survived the first round. Hoost followed on this tactic at the second, but Sapp eventually stunned him and knocked him down in return via repeated arm clubs to the head. The fighters went back and forth for the rest of the assault, until a drained Sapp finally managed to corner Hoost and overwhelm him with unanswered haymakers. At this point, referee Nobuaki Kakuda stopped the fight and gave Sapp the win. Those last seconds were a new source of controversy, as while Hoost was receiving continuous punishment, the stoppage still happened before he fell down. A worn Sapp forfeited his place in the tournament due to exhaustion and an injured hand, being ironically replaced by Hoost himself, who went on to win the cup.

At the ending of 2002, Sapp fought professional wrestler Yoshihiro Takayama at the Inoki Bom-Ba-Ye event. After rushing Takayama to the ground as usual, Sapp proved he had his own way with basic submissions by transitioning to an armbar from mount, making the wrestler tap out. Their fight reached a 24.5 rating in TV. By this time, Sapp's media schedule had grown up so much that he found himself without time to properly train for his fighting career. His trainer Matt Hume would describe it as, "if he would have had time to dedicate to strict training, he would have been a better fighter, however K-1 and Bob's priority was media exposure, so we accepted it and worked with it."

==== 2003 ====
Sapp's first defeat came at his fourth match, pitted against former K-1 champion Mirko Cro Cop on March 30, 2003. Despite being dedicated to mixed martial arts at the moment, Cro Cop had accepted the bout due to a lack of fighters willing to matchup with Sapp after his 2002 performance. Sapp also prepared specially for the fight, learning proper muay Thai and rumoredly training under Bas Rutten. Although Sapp pushed the fight for a minute, the mobile Cro Cop landed a liver shot and followed with a left hand that shattered Sapp's orbital bone, causing him to collapse on the mat and give up while in visible pain. He would need urgent surgery to repair the damage. Both Sapp and Cro Cop later talked about rematching under MMA rules, but this never came to fruition. Before this, Sapp had been placed in an upcoming fight against Francisco Filho, which had to be scrapped due to Sapp being ruled out from competition due to the injury.

A month later, hoping to capitalize on the success of Sapp and others, K-1 made a new fighting division called "Beast" (Sapp's nickname), which featured superheavyweights fighters such as Choi Hong-man. However, the division was stopped after two events due to disappointing reviews and gate takes. Still, Sapp was perceived to play a role in popularizing superheavyweights like Choi or Giant Silva in the sport, which he considered an accomplishment.

In August, Sapp participated in a special K-1 event in Las Vegas, where he went against Ultimate Fighting Championship veteran Kimo Leopoldo. Sapp had trained orthodox kickboxing with fellow UFC champion Maurice Smith for the match, and it could be noted in several powerful punches and knees that stunned Leopoldo. However, Sapp's stamina started to falter, which a slightly better conditioned Leopoldo capitalized on to take his turn, eventually knocking Sapp down at the end of the round. Controversy happened before the second, as referee Nobuaki Kakuda seemed to be deliberately giving Sapp time to recover, but the match continued anyway. Perceiving himself outclassed at a technical level, Sapp decided to return to his old bullrushing style, which paid off quickly by knocking Leopoldo down with a left hand. The UFC fighter tried to return the favor, but Sapp was already en route to overpower him and finally rendered him KO with an unchecked rabbit punch. In a marked contrast to Japan, American audiences booed Sapp.

The event in Las Vegas would not end without more controversy, as the victorious Sapp got in a verbal confrontation with former boxing Undisputed Heavyweight Champion Mike Tyson, who was sitting at ringside. Tyson jumped on the ring after Sapp and caused a brief brawl, after which Sapp and him exchanged challenges for a bout between the two. It was soon announced by K-1 that the match was in talks, with Tyson considering training with kickboxing coach Jacob Duran in case the bout was hosted under K-1 rules. However, Tyson's status as a convicted felon made him unable to get a visa to fight in Japan where the fight would have been most profitable. Other locations for the proposed fight were made, but the fight ultimately never happened.

Sapp returned to Japan in September, facing another superheavyweight, Stefan Gamlin, under MMA rules at K-1 Japan Grand Prix 2003. Despite being outweighed by the first time in his career, Sapp won in 0:52 with a guillotine choke. He continued challenging Tyson, claiming he would knock him out with high kicks, and also proposed a matchup against Francois Botha.

The next month, this time under K-1 rules, he fought Dutch champion Remy Bonjasky at the first round of the 2003 K-1 World Grand Prix. The match started with Bonjasky, famous for his flying knees and kicks, almost falling out the ring when Sapp threw him on the ropes in response to such attacks. The American chased a covered up Bonjasky through the ring while scoring punches and knees, but his opponent eventually bypassed his defense and landed a sharp roundhouse kick to end the first round. Bonkasky kept landing through the second, knocking Sapp down with a combination, but Sapp answered by pushing him to the ground and landing a heavy illegal punch. As Bonjasky refused to continue after the strike, Sapp was disqualified.

At the end of the year, Sapp was involved in a highly publicized matchup at K-1 PREMIUM 2003 Dynamite!! with former yokozuna Akebono Taro, who was doing his debut. The combined popularity of Sapp and Akebono attracted a crowd of 45,000 to the Nagoya Dome and granted the event a 43% viewership (roughly 54 million of the 127 million people in Japan at the time), making it the first time a combat sports event outdrew the NHK music festival Kōhaku Uta Gassen, Japan's traditionally biggest New Year's Eve show. The classical matchup of an American foreigner like Sapp against a Japanese national like Taro, a cultural contraposition, also gained comparisons with Japanese professional wrestling legend Rikidōzan in his bouts against The Sharpe Brothers. The match itself, however, was short and intense. Though outweighed by over 150 pounds, Sapp had the advantage at experience and stamina, allowing him endure Akebono's initially energetic sumo pushes in order to counterattack. He attacked Akebono with low kicks and punching combinations to the head and body, knocking him down twice before finishing him by KO at 2:58. After defeating Akebono, Sapp engaged in another verbal exchange with Mike Tyson about a possible match, although nothing came from it.

==== 2004–2007 ====
Sapp opened 2004 facing Dolgorsürengiin Sumyaabazar, multiple wrestling champion and brother to yokozuna Asashoryu, under a mixed martial arts ruleset at his own event, K-1 Beast. Showing improvement in his MMA technique, Sapp defended from his guard after being taken down, trading short strikes from there and threatening with Kimura locks. Sumyaabazar ended up passing his guard, but Sapp reversed and captured his back, almost closing a rear naked choke, Sumyaabazar had to abandon the match before the second round due to a groin injury. Only two weeks later, he fought against Seth Petruzelli, this time at kickboxing, but the result was similar: although he knocked Sapp down, Petruzelli injured his biceps and was forced to bow out.

After a 0:33 victory over muay thai journeyman Tommy Glanville, Sapp was pitted against wrestler Kazuyuki Fujita at K-1 Romanex. Although the American looked to strike, Fujita scored an early takedown and initiated a grappling scuffle. Sapp looked to defend from the bottom and at one point pursued a heel hook, transitioned into a toehold, but the Japanese escaped to his feet and started delivering soccer kicks with his wrestling shoes to Sapp's head. Fujita kept landing brutal kicks and punches to a desperately covered up Sapp until the latter tapped out at 2:15. After this sound loss, Sapp lost again in a two-round fight against Ray Sefo.

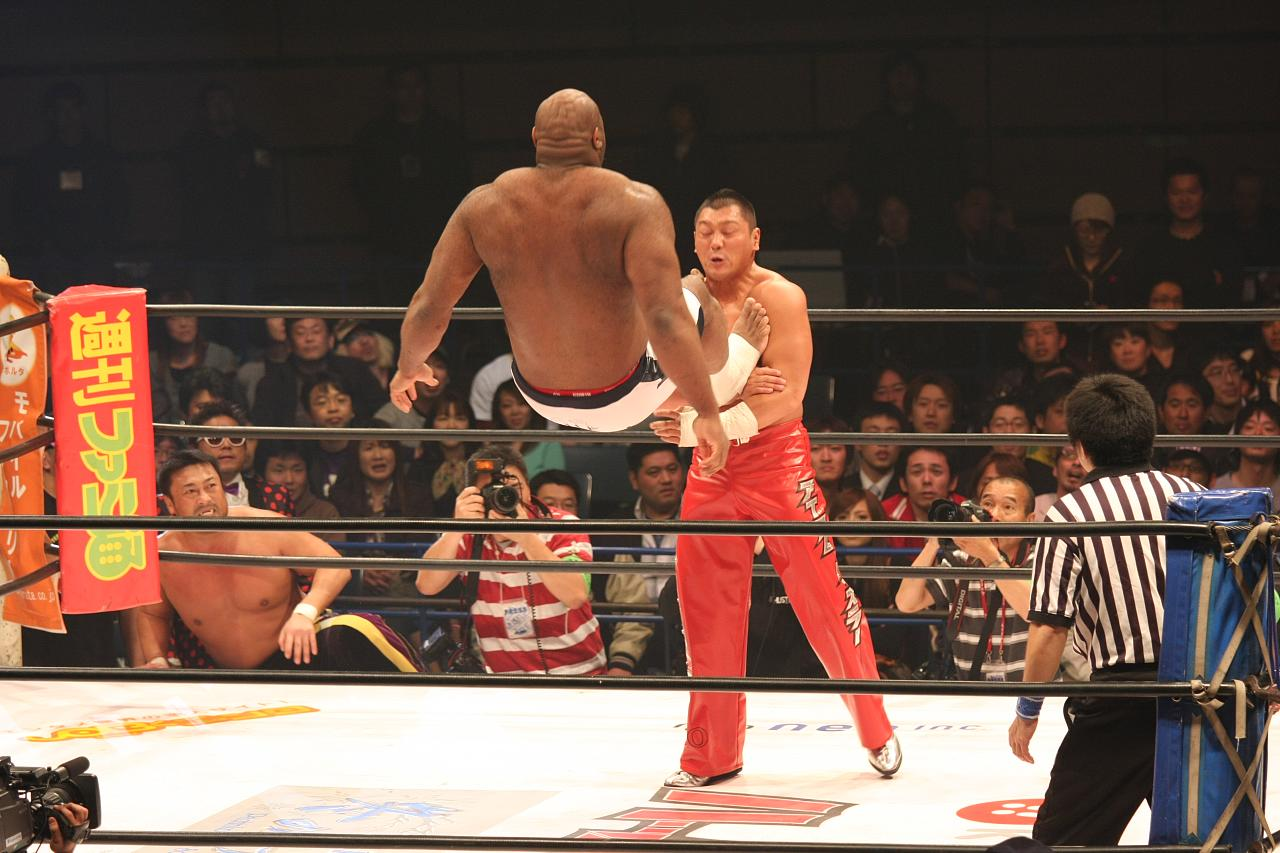
Sapp executing a dropkick on Wataru Sakata.

At K-1 Premium Dynamite!! Sapp faced Jérôme Le Banner in a special mixed rules match, in which first and third rounds would be under regular K-1 rules and under MMA rules the second and fourth. Sapp spent the first round covering and guarding up, almost being finished, but he recovered in the second one by taking down Le Banner and raining ground and pound from the mount. He kept the momentum at the third, utilizing a defensive strategy of charging and clinching to neutralize Le Banner; however, most of the action would take place at the fourth and last, which saw the two trading dominant positions and ended with Sapp looking for an armlock. Under the agreed upon rules, the fight was declared a draw. Sapp dedicated the fight to the memory of sparring partner Masaaki Miyamoto's father who had recently died.

2005 would be a fruitful year for Sapp, starting by a win over judo medalist Kim Min-soo at K-1's new MMA sub-promotion Hero's. This prepared Sapp for a run to the 2005 K-1 Hiroshima Grand Prix, where he would face three fighters on a single night in order to qualify for the 2005 K-1 World Grand Prix. In a departure from his performances up to the point, Sapp showcased improvement after intensive training under his long time friend Sam Greco.

Sapp met upcoming fighter Yoshihiro Nakao in the quarter-final, where he would fight all three rounds in dominant fashion. Nakao taunted Sapp during the fight, but the American kept landing kicks and knees in addition to his personal bullrushing style, including also previously unseen counterstrikes. After securing a unanimous decision, Sapp advanced round and faced young fighter Hiraku Hori, who had just defeated Nakasako. This time Sapp increased his aggression and came near to finishing Hori early with a barrage of punches and a cut, but the Japanese resisted and kept him at bay with high kicks towards the end of the first round. The second would see Sapp uncharacteristically standing still and inviting his opponent to charge at him, which he capitalized on to knock down Hori with hooks before finishing him. The final saw Sapp being pitted against Tatsufumi Tomihira, a karateka famous for his own fouls. The American methodically dismantled Tomihira, scoring two consecutive knockdowns in the first seconds and almost finishing him in the last ones with a cornering barrage. After slowing down in the second and third rounds, where they exchanged kicks and punches, Sapp controlled him for a unanimous decision win, taking the victory at the tournament.

In the post-event interview, Greco praised Sapp's dedication, while Sapp himself gave a speech about his tenure. "I've had low points in my career, now this is a high point and I am enjoying it! I think I've proven I belong in K-1." As promised, Sapp won a prize of 5,000,000 yen and a place among the 16 fighters qualified for the K-1 World Grand Prix.

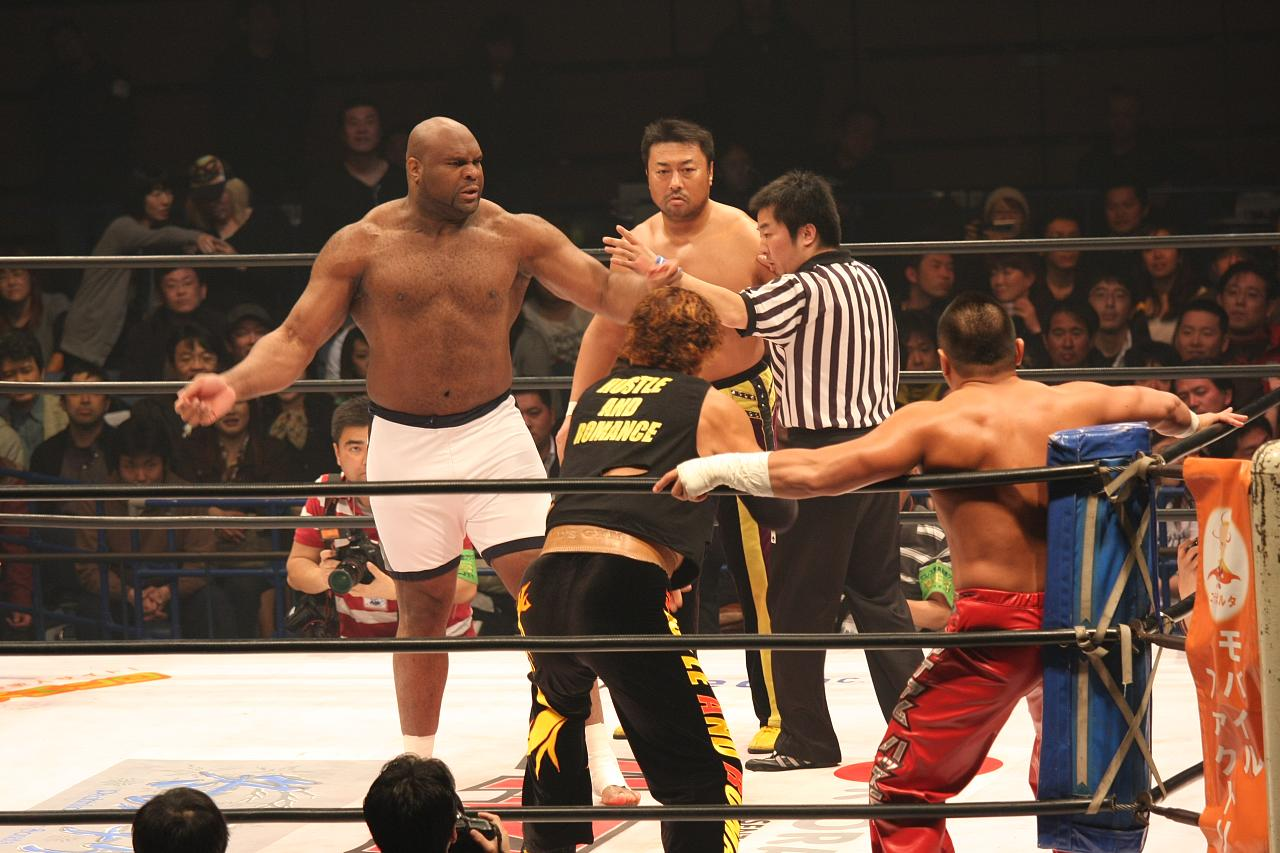
Sapp (left) and Toshiaki Kawada looking at their opponents prior to a match in Hustle.

Shortly after, Sapp returned to MMA format for Hero's, where he was pitted against Russian sumo wrestler Alan Karaev. With Sapp's former opponent Akebono in attendance, Karaev surprised the American with aggression and a quick takedown to mount, but Sapp managed to get out after a failed rear naked choke attempt and hold his own mount for a longer time. Restarted the fight on the feet, Sapp knocked Karaev out with a left jab.

Come the K-1 Grand Prix 2005, Sapp was paired against fellow superheavyweight Choi Hong-man in the first round. Choi's large reach and great size allowed him to land hits regularly through Sapp's charges, but the latter pressed on and got an early knockdown by low kicks to the knee. However, although Sapp came aggressively again in the second round, his stamina started faltering, giving Choi the chance to unload multiple punches. Ultimately, a series of wild battles against an already similarly tired Choi were decided in the latter's favor, granting him a majority decision win.

On May 13, 2006, Sapp was to headline the K-1 show in the Netherlands against Ernesto Hoost, in which Hoost had stated that it was to be his last match in the Netherlands before his retirement. Sapp attended all the pre-fight press conferences and even attended the opening ceremonies for the show. It is unclear at the moment as to why, but Sapp pulled out of the event midway through the show. K-1 issued a statement claiming Sapp pulled out due to new demands he brought to promoters during the show. Sapp disagreed with K-1's account of events, claiming the promotion had tried to delay his payment without any contractual safety.

However, he did participate in 2007's K-1 event in the Amsterdam Arena, fighting in short notice as a replacement for Remy Bonjasky against Peter Aerts. Sapp lost the fight by KO within 20 seconds in the first round by a knee to the liver.

After his falling out with K-1, Sapp began to get offers from World Wrestling Entertainment as well as Total Nonstop Action Wrestling to work with them, but his K-1 contract prohibited him from going through with any return to the ring. It was reported WWE was considering an angle between Sapp and Chris Benoit in case they managed to clear his contract out, but they were unsuccessful. Sapp finally made a surprise return to the K-1 ring in Japan after a two-year absence against comedian and part-time K-1 competitor Bobby Ologun. Ologun was unable to mount any effective offense as he was quickly run down and overpowered by Sapp in the first round. Afterwards, with his K-1 contract finally done, Sapp signed up with Hustle and focused on his professional wrestling career.

=== After K-1 ===
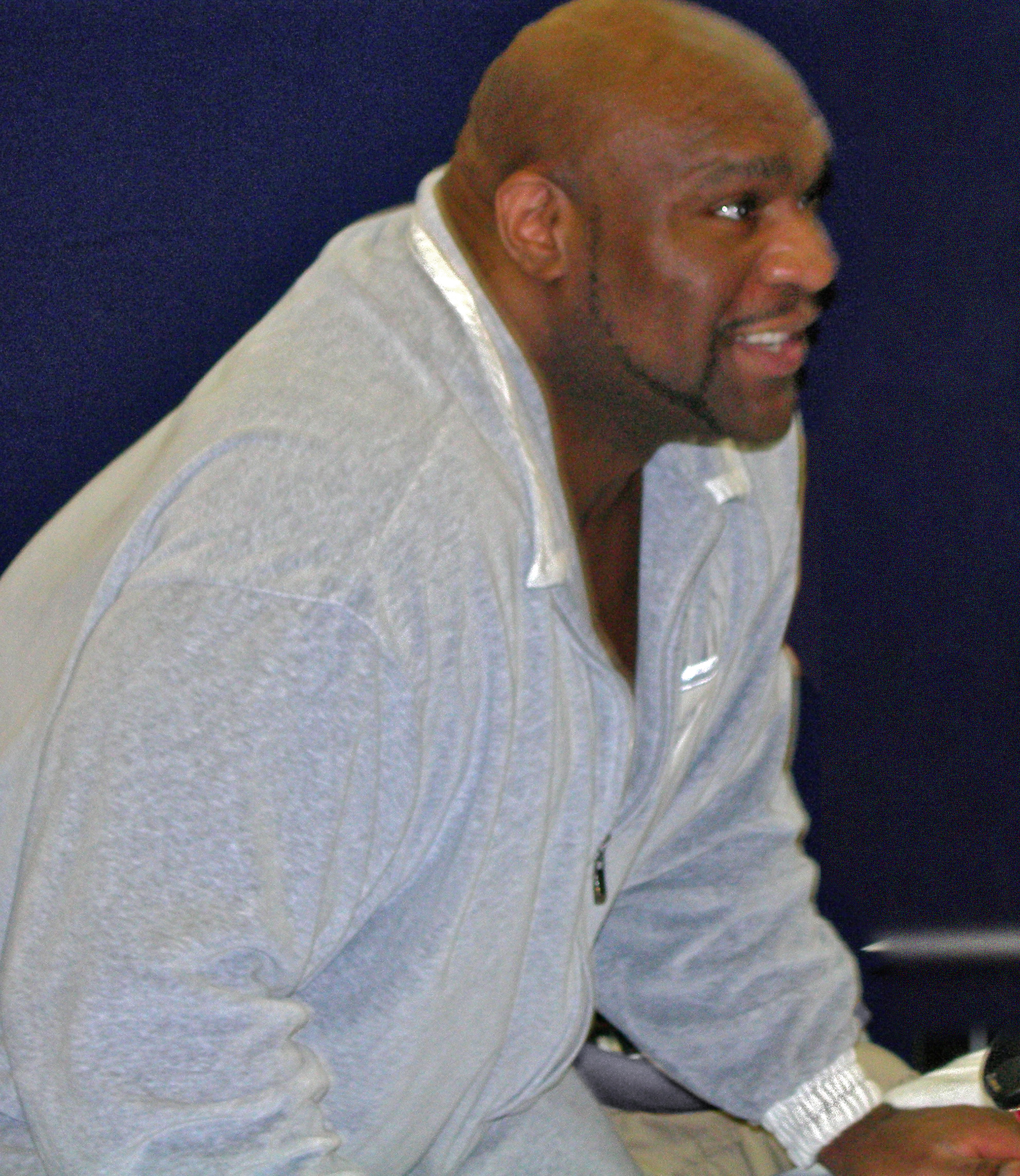
Sapp interviewed in Japan.

Since his last matches for K-1 in 2007, Sapp continued his career for small promotions in a limited, non-competitive in-ring way that was described as throwing fights. He would step into the ring after great amounts of promotion, often against upcoming stars and heavily promoted local fighters, only to turtle down and tap out in a few seconds. This routine, labelled in sports as a "tomato can" act, effectively ended his already inconsistent reputation in the sports, attracting large losing streaks and the accusations of "making a mockery of the sport of MMA" and "being a one-man circus". His usual commentator Mirko Cro Cop expressed his belief that Sapp was intentionally allowing himself to lose against very inferior opponents.

I asked him, "Bob, why are you doing this?" He is too dangerous, he is such a huge guy. I saw some of his fights, he was fighting in Europe. Ninety-nine percent of the fights he lost here in Europe, he could've kicked their asses easily. Why he didn't do that? To me, it looked like he was doing that with some intention. He just wanted to lose the fight.

When asked about it, Sapp denied he was throwing fights, and claimed he was doing this routine to collect quick paychecks in a late career he did not deem economically worthy to risk his health. He also pointed out a perceived injustice in contemporaneous MMA business, where fighters carrying accolades and important legacies would be left in economic instability after retiring. He explained:

Am I throwing these fights? No. Will I go into that ring and receive large amounts of damage for small paychecks? No. When it came to K-1, at the time, when everyone at K-1 was doing well, they get paid significantly enough to have you go into that ring, and hey, any kind of injury you get, they are going to pay. [...] These small organizations that you see that look so wonderful, they pay none of your bills if you get hurt, period. If you want to get hurt for a small amount of money in a fight, we call that the military. You said it yourself, you have UFC fighters who are fighting more, and who are doing harder fights, and are getting less money. So you know what? [...] I do the same thing as everyone else, just as a promoter. They say fight business, and I am in the business of making money. How do I judge whether I have a successful fight? Success is judged by the measure of improvement. The measure of improvement in business is money.

==== Cage Rage, Strike Force and BAMMA ====
On February 10, 2007, it was announced by the United Kingdom's Cage Rage promotion that Sapp would appear on its Cage Rage 21 event on April 21, facing Gary Turner. The move was partly a retaliatory one, as the UFC had chosen to run its first British show in years that same night at the Manchester Evening News Arena, headlined by Mirko Cro Cop, Andrei Arlovski and British star Michael Bisping. Though Cage Rage promoter Andy Geer said that the UFC show would not affect ticket sales for CR21, the signing of Sapp was a clear sign that the company knew it would need a superstar draw in order to successfully compete with the American promotion. A few days before the event Bob Sapp pulled out of the scheduled fight. On short notice, Tank Abbott stepped in for Sapp and lost to Gary Turner.

Sapp faced the South African fighter Jan "The Giant" Nortje at the Strikeforce: At The Dome event in Tacoma, Washington, at the Tacoma Dome on February 23, 2008. Sapp was defeated at the 55-second mark of the first round by TKO after receiving an unanswered amount of punches. Sapp then returned to Japan on New Year's Eve 2008 and defeated Akihito Tanaka via first-round TKO.

Sapp lost to Japanese Ikuhisa Minowa at Dream 9 on May 26, 2009, due to Achilles lock. He fought and lost to Bobby Lashley at Ultimate Chaos in Biloxi, Mississippi, on June 27, 2009, due to first round tapout from strikes. On October 6, Sapp stood in for an injured Gegard Mousasi to face Rameau Thierry Sokoudjou in the semi-finals at Dream 11. He lost via TKO (punches) in the first round.

On November 27, Sapp fought against Swedish K-1 veteran Jörgen Kruth. The fight got a lot of publicity in Swedish and international press, but ended with an anticlimax when Sapp's corner threw in the towel after only 45 seconds, after Kruth hit Sapp with a knee to the liver.

Sapp was next going to face Stav Economou at BAMMA 5, but the event was canceled due to extreme weather conditions.

==== Dynamite, ONE and Legend ====
Sapp was scheduled to fight at K1 Dynamite!! 2010. He was set to battle Shinichi Suzukawa on New Year's Eve in a Pancrase-style matchup, but pulled out at the last minute due to contract disputes. When questioned about Sapp's refusal to fight on the day of the event, FEG President Sadaharu Tanikawa asked, "Does anyone actually care? I don't know the reasons why, but we did our best to make him fight. He just said he didn't want to. This is typical [of Sapp]." Sapp claims he refused to fight after promoters were contracted to pay him $30,000 for the fight, but Tanikawa only offered him $15,000 after he arrived in Japan for the event.

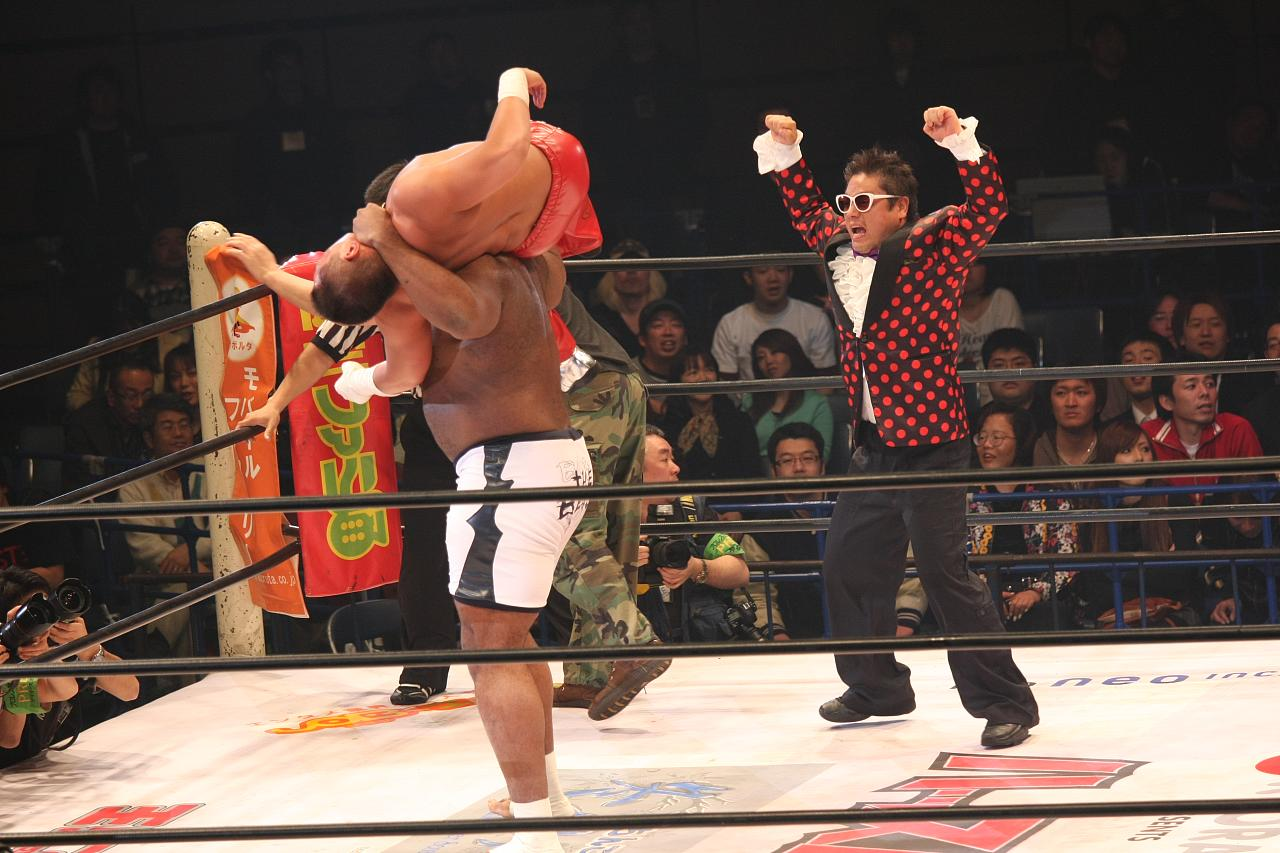
Sapp executing one of his finishing moves, the Beast Backbreaker, on Wataru Sakata in Hustle.

On February 11, 2012, Sapp debuted for the Asian ONE Fighting Championship promotion. He faced Rolles Gracie at ONE Fighting Championship: Battle of Heroes in Jakarta, Indonesia and lost via submission to strikes in the first round.

Sapp fought in the main event of the Super Fight League's inaugural event, SFL 1, against James Thompson on March 11, 2012. Sapp tapped out due to a Thompson takedown that caused a leg injury to Sapp in the first round.

He also fought Yōsuke Nishijima in Nishijima's retirement fight under kickboxing rules Legend 4 in Kumamoto, Japan on November 17, 2013. Sapp was dropped with a body shot, stood back up but was then finished with body shots followed by couple of right hooks.

Sapp announced his retirement in April 2014 citing that he'd paid off big medical bills and will be retiring with several million dollars in savings (including money doing work outside of fights).

Returning to kickboxing after a nearly two-year hiatus, Sapp appeared at Fight Night Saint Tropez on August 4, 2017, in Saint Tropez, France. He faced Greg Tony and lost the bout via TKO in the first round.

On January 27, 2018, Sapp faced Selcuk Ustabasi at MFC 24. Sapp lost the bout via TKO in the first round.

=== Rizin Fighting Federation ===
Sapp had a rematch against Akebono with shoot boxing rules on December 31, 2015, at Rizin Fighting Federation Grand Prix event. Unlike his usual performances, he won the fight by technical decision.

He returned in September 2018 at Rizin 13, where he fought former sumo Osunaarashi. Sapp received intense striking during the first round and was taken down at the second, but he reversed Osunaarashi as they fell and gained top position, from which he controlled the rest of the round. He went to dominate an uneventful last round for a unanimous decision and his first MMA win in nearly nine years.

=== Boxing ===
Sapp was said to go up against Mike Tyson in a 8-round exhibition boxing match, however no personal terms were agreed and Tyson fought Roy Jones Jr. instead.

=== Clout MMA ===
Sapp was scheduled to fight Piotr Piechowiak at Clout MMA 2: Omielańczuk vs. Bad Boy, but the bout was cancelled.

=== Fight Circus ===
In 2021, Sapp joined appeared at Full Metal Dojo's Fight Circus 2 in Thailand and started competing regularly in the promotion. On April 2, 2023, Sapp competed in the main event of Fight Circus 6: The Rise or Fall of Sloppy Balboa in a two-on-two boxing match, teaming up with Quinton Jackson against the promotion's CEO, Jon Nutt and Bangtao Muay Thai strength and conditioning coach Andrew Wood. Sapp and Jackson also recreated the Rocky chicken chase scene ahead of the match. Sapp and Jackson were tied together wearing an oversized t-shirt. The event was presented on FITE and Jackson and Sapp won by third-round TKO.

== Fighting style ==
Having no background in martial arts prior to his fighting career, Sapp's fighting style was relatively devoid of technique, and was more so distinguished by an aggressive usage of size and strength, pressuring his opponents with an unorthodox "bullrush" technique (which he dubbed as "NFL Style"), whereby he would rush an opponent, usually at the beginning of the round, and overwhelm them with a barrage of punches.

Although defined by his brute strength, Sapp's wins over opponents such as Yoshihiro Takayama and Stefan Gamlin showed that he did possess a knowledge of basic submission techniques.

== Personal life ==
In December 2017, it was reported in Japanese newspaper Shukan Bunshun that a woman claiming to be Sapp's girlfriend accused him of domestic violence. She provided photographs of the alleged injuries and told how she had been abused by Sapp for six years. Although the article included an apology message supposedly sent by him, Sapp did not make public comments about the accusation. No civil suit was filed, and no criminal proceedings were announced as a result of the allegations.

== Championships and accomplishments ==
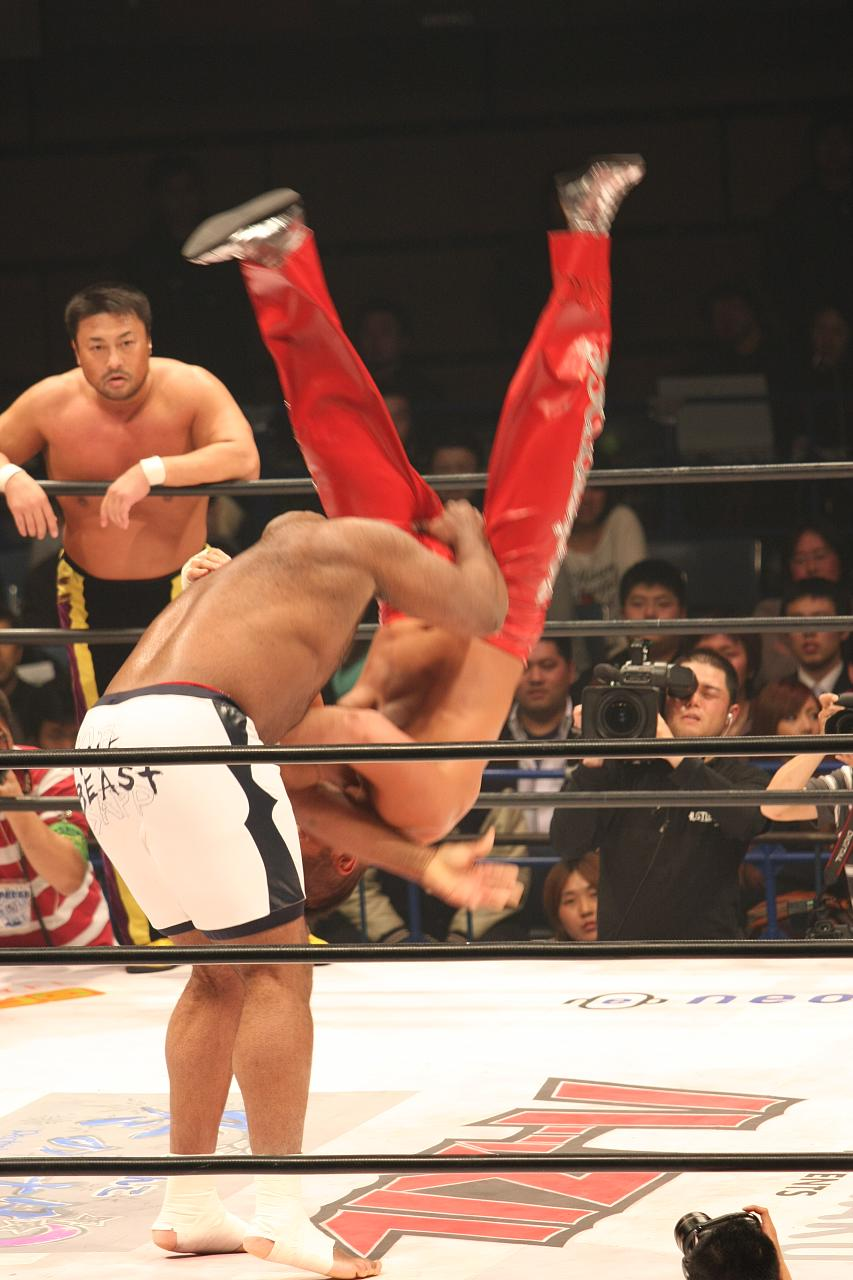
Sapp executing a scoop powerslam on Wataru Sakata.

=== Kickboxing and mixed martial arts ===
- Black Belt Magazine
  - 2003 NHB Fighter of the Year
- K-1
  - K-1 World Grand Prix 2005 in Hiroshima Tournament Winner
- Nikkan Sports
  - Match of the Year (2002) vs. Ernesto Hoost (K-1, December 7)
- Superkombat Fighting Championship
  - 2011 Special Fight of the Year. Alexandru Lungu)
- Wrestling Observer Newsletter
  - 2002 Best Box Office Draw- K-1, PRIDE Fighting Championships
  - 2003 Best Box Office Draw- K-1, PRIDE Fighting Championships
  - 2002 Rookie of the Year- K-1, PRIDE Fighting Championships
- MMA Fighting
  - 2002 Fight of the Year vs. Antônio Rodrigo Nogueira at Pride Shockwave

=== Professional wrestling ===
- New Japan Pro-Wrestling
  - IWGP Heavyweight Championship (1 time)
- Nikkan Sports
  - Wrestler of the Year (2002)
  - Outstanding Performance Award (2002)
- Pro Wrestling Illustrated
  - Ranked No. 26 of the top 500 singles wrestlers in the PWI 500 in 2004
- Tokyo Sports
  - MVP Award (2002)
- World Wrestling Association (South Korea)
  - WWA World Heavyweight Championship (1 time)
- Wrestling Observer Newsletter
  - Most Charismatic (2003)
  - Best Box Office Draw (2002, 2003)

== Kickboxing record ==
12 wins (9 KOs), 19 losses
Result	Record	Opponent	Method	Event	Date	Round	Time	Location	Notes
Loss	12–19	Selcuk Ustabasi	TKO (punch)	MFC 24	January 27, 2018	1	0:56	İzmir, Turkey	
Loss	12–18	Grégory Tony	TKO (punch)	Fight Night Saint-Tropez	August 4, 2017	1	1:40	Saint-Tropez, France	
Win	12–17	Akebono	Technical Decision	Rizin Fighting Federation 2	December 31, 2015	2	0:49	Saitama (city), Japan	Shoot boxing rules.
Loss	11–17	Yōsuke Nishijima	TKO (punches)	Legend 4	November 17, 2013	1	2:36	Kumamoto, Japan	
Loss	11–16	Taishan	KO (punch)	IGF GENOME 24	February 23, 2013	1	1:39	Tokyo, Japan	
Loss	11–15	Rok Štrucl	TKO (punch)	WFC 16	April 22, 2012	1	1:35	Ljubljana, Slovenia	
Win	11–14	Tofan Pirani	TKO (injury)	DIBC 2012	February 2, 2012	2	N/A	Dubai, United Arab Emirates	Pirani injured himself while kicking Sapp.
Loss	10–14	Alexandru Lungu	KO (left hook)	SUPERKOMBAT World Grand Prix IV 2011	October 15, 2011	1	0:56	Piatra Neamț, Romania	
Loss	10–13	Florian Pavic	Decision (unanimous)	Steko's Fight Night	August 26, 2011	3	3:00	Karlsruhe, Germany	
Loss	10–12	Tivadar Kunkli	TKO (elbow)	Fight Code: Dragons Round 3	May 1, 2011	1	N/A	Budapest, Hungary	
Loss	10–11	Masayoshi Kakutani	KO (knee)	Inoki Genome Federation 15	April 28, 2011	1	1:19	Tokyo, Japan	
Loss	10–10	Jörgen Kruth	TKO (corner stoppage)	K-1 Scandinavia Rumble of the Kings 2010	November 27, 2010	1	1:19	Stockholm, Sweden	
Loss	10–9	Patrice Quarteron	KO (knee)	A1 World Combat Cup	November 28, 2009	1	2:32	Lyon, France	
Loss	10–8	Alain Ngalani	Decision	Planet Battle IV	October 7, 2009	3	3:00	Wan Chai, Hong Kong	
Loss	10–7	Peter Aerts	KO (left knee)	K-1 World Grand Prix 2007 in Amsterdam	June 23, 2007	1	0:26	Amsterdam, Netherlands	
Loss	10–6	Musashi	Decision (unanimous)	K-1 PREMIUM 2005 Dynamite!!	December 31, 2005	3	3:00	Osaka, Japan	
Loss	10–5	Choi Hong-man	Decision (majority)	K-1 World Grand Prix 2005 in Osaka – Final Elimination	September 25, 2005	3	3:00	Osaka, Japan	2005 K-1 World Grand Prix opening round.
Win	10–4	Tatsufumi Tomihira	Decision (unanimous)	K-1 World Grand Prix 2005 in Hiroshima	June 14, 2005	3	3:00	Hiroshima, Japan	2005 Hiroshima Grand Prix final.
Win	9–4	Hiraku Hori	KO (strikes)	K-1 World Grand Prix 2005 in Hiroshima	June 14, 2005	2	1:54	Hiroshima, Japan	2005 Hiroshima Grand Prix semi-final.
Win	8–4	Yoshihiro Nakao	Decision (unanimous)	K-1 World Grand Prix 2005 in Hiroshima	June 14, 2005	3	3:00	Hiroshima, Japan	2005 Hiroshima Grand Prix quarter-final.
Loss	7–4	Ray Sefo	KO (body shot)	K-1 Beast 2004 in Shizuoka	June 26, 2004	2	0:29	Shizuoka, Japan	
Win	7–3	Tommy Glanville	KO (left hooks)	K-1 World Grand Prix 2004 in Las Vegas I	April 30, 2004	1	0:33	Las Vegas, Nevada, United States	
Win	6–3	Seth Petruzelli	TKO (elbow injury)	K-1 World Grand Prix 2004 in Saitama	March 27, 2004	1	0:57	Saitama, Japan	
Win	5–3	Akebono	KO (right hook)	K-1 PREMIUM 2003 Dynamite!!	December 31, 2003	1	2:58	Nagoya, Japan	
Loss	4–3	Remy Bonjasky	DQ (punch on the ground)	K-1 World Grand Prix 2003 Final Elimination	October 11, 2003	2	1:20	Osaka, Japan	2003 K-1 World Grand Prix opening round.
Win	4–2	Kimo Leopoldo	KO (punch)	K-1 World Grand Prix 2003 in Las Vegas II	August 13, 2003	2	1:11	Las Vegas, Nevada, United States	
Loss	3–2	Mirko Cro Cop	KO (left cross)	K-1 World Grand Prix 2003 in Saitama	March 30, 2003	1	1:26	Saitama, Japan	
Win	3–1	Ernesto Hoost	TKO (referee stoppage)	K-1 World Grand Prix 2002 Final	December 7, 2002	2	2:53	Tokyo, Japan	2002 K-1 World Grand Prix quarter-final.
Win	2–1	Ernesto Hoost	TKO (doctor stoppage)	K-1 World Grand Prix 2002 Final Elimination	October 5, 2002	1	3:00	Saitama, Japan	2002 K-1 World Grand Prix opening round.
Win	1–1	Cyril Abidi	TKO (referee stoppage)	K-1 Andy Spirits Japan GP 2002 Final	September 22, 2002	1	1:17	Osaka, Japan	
Loss	0–1	Tsuyoshi Nakasako	DQ (punch on the ground)	K-1 Survival 2002	June 2, 2002	1	1:30	Toyama, Japan	
Legend Win Loss Draw/No contest

== Mixed martial arts record ==
Professional record breakdown
32 matches	12 wins	20 losses
By knockout	8	15
By submission	3	4
By decision	1	0
By disqualification	0	1

Res.	Record	Opponent	Method	Event	Date	Round	Time	Location	Notes
Win	12–20	Ōsunaarashi Kintarō	Decision (unanimous)	Rizin 13	September 30, 2018	3	3:00	Saitama, Japan	Super Heavyweight bout.
Loss	11–20	Aorigele	TKO (punches)	Road FC 32	July 2, 2016	1	0:35	Changsha, China	
Loss	11–19	Edson França	Submission (rear-naked choke)	OX MMA 1	August 8, 2013	1	0:35	Fortaleza, Brazil	
Loss	11–18	Alexander Emelianenko	TKO (punches)	Legend Fighting Show 1	May 25, 2013	1	1:18	Moscow, Russia	
Loss	11–17	Dusan Panajotovic	TKO (submission to punches)	Ultimate Fight Serbia: Night of the Champions 2012	September 15, 2012	1	1:28	Belgrade, Serbia	
Loss	11–16	Kim Jong-dae	TKO (punches)	Road FC 8	June 16, 2012	2	1:58	Wonju, South Korea	Openweight bout.
Loss	11–15	Tolegen Akylbekov	TKO (submission to punches)	Bushido Lithuania vol.51	June 8, 2012	1	1:29	Astana, Kazakhstan	
Loss	11–14	Soa Palelei	TKO (punches)	Cage FC 21	May 18, 2012	1	0:12	Sydney, Australia	
Loss	11–13	Mariusz Pudzianowski	TKO (punches)	KSW 19	May 12, 2012	1	0:40	Łódź, Poland	
Loss	11–12	James Thompson	TKO (leg injury)	Super Fight League 1	March 11, 2012	1	1:56	Mumbai, India	
Loss	11–11	Rolles Gracie Jr.	TKO (submission to strikes)	ONE FC: Battle of Heroes	February 11, 2012	1	1:18	Jakarta, Indonesia	
Loss	11–10	Alexander Otsuka	DQ (illegal slams)	ACCEL vol. 18	December 25, 2011	2	1:43	Kobe, Japan	
Loss	11–9	Maro Perak	TKO (punches)	Noc Gladijatora 6	December 16, 2011	1	3:04	Dubrovnik, Croatia	
Loss	11–8	Attila Uçar	Submission (achilles lock)	Premium Fight Night 1	April 30, 2011	1	0:56	Vienna, Austria	
Loss	11–7	Stav Economou	TKO (punches)	Abu Dhabi FC: Round 3	March 11, 2011	1	1:45	Abu Dhabi, United Arab Emirates	
Win	11–6	Sascha Weinpolter	Submission (forearm choke)	Obracun Ringu 10	March 27, 2010	1	2:03	Split, Croatia	
Loss	10–6	Rameau Thierry Sokoudjou	TKO (punches)	Dream 11	October 6, 2009	1	1:31	Yokohama, Japan	2009 DREAM Super Hulk Grand Prix Semifinal.
Loss	10–5	Bobby Lashley	TKO (submission to punches)	Fight Force International: Ultimate Chaos	June 27, 2009	1	3:18	Biloxi, Mississippi, United States	
Loss	10–4	Ikuhisa Minowa	Submission (achilles lock)	Dream 9	May 26, 2009	1	1:16	Yokohama, Japan	2009 DREAM Super Hulk Grand Prix Quarterfinal.
Win	10–3	Akihito Tanaka	TKO (punches)	Dynamite!! 2008	December 31, 2008	1	5:22	Saitama, Japan	
Loss	9–3	Jan Nortje	TKO (punches)	Strikeforce: At The Dome	February 23, 2008	1	0:55	Tacoma, Washington, United States	Super Heavyweight bout.
Win	9–2	Bobby Ologun	TKO (punches)	K-1 Premium 2007 Dynamite!!	December 31, 2007	1	4:10	Osaka, Japan	
Win	8–2	Kim Jong-wang	TKO (punches and knee)	Hero's 2005 in Seoul	November 5, 2005	1	0:08	Seoul, South Korea	
Win	7–2	Alan Karaev	KO (punch)	Hero's 2	July 6, 2005	1	3:44	Tokyo, Japan	
Win	6–2	Kim Min-soo	KO (punch)	Hero's 1	March 26, 2005	1	1:12	Saitama, Japan	
Loss	5–2	Kazuyuki Fujita	TKO (submission to soccer kicks)	K-1: Romanex 2004	May 22, 2004	1	2:15	Saitama, Japan	
Win	5–1	Dolgorsürengiin Sumyaabazar	TKO (foot injury)	K-1 Beast 2004 in Niigata	March 14, 2004	1	5:00	Niigata, Japan	
Win	4–1	Stefan Gamlin	Submission (guillotine choke)	K-1: Survival 2003	September 21, 2003	1	0:52	Yokohama, Japan	
Win	3–1	Yoshihiro Takayama	Submission (armbar)	Inoki Bom-Ba-Ye 2002	December 31, 2002	1	2:16	Saitama, Japan	
Loss	2–1	Antônio Rodrigo Nogueira	Submission (armbar)	Pride Shockwave	August 28, 2002	2	4:03	Tokyo, Japan	Heavyweight debut.
Win	2–0	Kiyoshi Tamura	TKO (punches)	Pride 21	June 23, 2002	1	0:11	Saitama, Japan	
Win	1–0	Yoshihisa Yamamoto	KO (punches)	Pride 20	April 28, 2002	1	2:44	Yokohama, Japan	Super Heavyweight debut.

== Fight Circus record ==
1 win (1 TKO), 0 losses
Result	Record	Opponent	Method	Event	Date	Round	Time	Location	Notes
Win	1–0	Jon Nutt and Woody	Technical knockout	Fight Circus 6: The Rise or Fall of Sloppy Balboa	April 2, 2023	3	0:37	Phuket, Thailand	Two-on-two Siamese boxing match. Sapp was teamed with Quinton Jackson.
Legend Win Loss Draw/No contest

== Mixed rules record ==
Professional record breakdown
1 match	0 wins	0 losses
Draws	1	

Res.	Record	Opponent	Method	Event	Date	Round	Time	Location	Notes
Draw	0–0–1	Jérôme Le Banner	Decision	K-1 PREMIUM 2004 Dynamite!!	December 31, 2004	4	3:00	Tokyo, Japan	The fight was with both Mixed Martial Arts and K-1 rules.

== Filmography ==
Year	Title	Role
2003	Bob Sapp: Sapp Time The Movie!	Himself
2003	You're Under Arrest	Bob Hage
2004	Izo	Monk
2005	Elektra	Stone
2005	Devilman	World Newscaster
2005	The Longest Yard	Switowski
2007	Big Stan	Raymond "Big Raymond"
2009	Frankenhood	Frankie
2009	Blood and Bone	"Hammer Man"
2011	Blood Out	Uncredited
2011	Conan the Barbarian	Ukafa
2012	JourneyQuest (6 episodes, Season 2)	Karn, The Barbarian King
2013	Miss Pilot	Roy
2018	Big in Japan	Himself

== See also ==
- List of gridiron football players who became professional wrestlers
- List of male mixed martial artists
- List of multi-sport athletes
- List of professional wrestlers by MMA record
