= Yoshihiro Nakao =

Japanese kickboxer and mixed martial arts fighter (born 1972)

Yoshihiro Nakao 中尾芳広
- Born: June 25, 1972 (age 54); Tokyo, Japan
- Other names: Kiss
- Height: 5 ft 11 in (180 cm)
- Weight: 215 lb (98 kg; 15 st 5 lb)
- Division: Heavyweight (265 lb)
- Style: MMA, Kickboxing
- Fighting out of: Saitama, Japan
- Team: Team TACKLER; Grabaka; R-Blood
- Years active: 2003–2012

Mixed martial arts record
- Total: 14
- Wins: 9
- By knockout: 4
- By submission: 2
- By decision: 3
- Losses: 3
- By knockout: 1
- By decision: 2
- No contests: 2

Other information
- Mixed martial arts record from Sherdog

Yoshihiro Nakao (Japanese: 中尾芳広, Nakao Yoshihiro) (born June 25, 1972) is a Japanese semi-retired professional mixed martial artist and former K-1 kickboxer and PRIDE FC fighter who has defeated the likes of Don Frye, Choi Mu-Bae, Jim York, Wesley Correira and Edson Draggo. Nakao is a World Victory Road veteran and signed a contract with DREAM in 2011 before the promotion closed in mid-2012. Nakao lost to Antônio Silva at World Victory Road Presents: Sengoku Rebellion 2009 after suffering an ACL injury as a result of a leg kick from Silva in the first round. Nakao most recently fought Dave Herman at Sengoku: Soul of Fight, losing by unanimous decision. In 2012 Nakao has decided to briefly retire from mixed martial arts to let some of his recent injuries heal and focus on family more. Nakao earned the nickname "kiss" after he kissed Heath Herring on the lips and was subsequently knocked out by Herring before their fight even began at K-1 PREMIUM 2005 Dynamite!!.

== New Year's Eve kiss ==
On December 31, 2005, Nakao was participating in K-1's Dynamite 2005 show. During the pre-fight staredown with opponent Heath Herring, Nakao leaned in and kissed him on the lips. Herring reacted, delivering a right hook to Nakao's jaw, knocking him out cold. Herring was immediately disqualified and Nakao was carried from the ring. Shortly thereafter, Nakao's cornermen attacked Herring and a brief melee ensued.

The fight result has since been changed by K-1 from a disqualification loss for Herring to a no contest, as K-1 judges ruled that Nakao's kiss and Herring's subsequent knockout punch were both fouls.

== Mixed martial arts record ==
Professional record breakdown
| 14 matches | 9 wins | 3 losses |
| By knockout | 4 | 1 |
| By submission | 2 | 0 |
| By decision | 3 | 2 |
| No contests | 2 | |

| Res. | Record | Opponent | Method | Event | Date | Round | Time | Location | Notes |
|---|---|---|---|---|---|---|---|---|---|
| Loss | 9–3 (2) | Dave Herman | Decision (unanimous) | World Victory Road Presents: Soul of Fight | December 30, 2010 | 3 | 5:00 | Tokyo, Japan | |
| Win | 9–2 (2) | Henry Miller | TKO (punches) | World Victory Road Presents: Sengoku Raiden Championships 12 | March 7, 2010 | 2 | 3:27 | Tokyo, Japan | |
| Win | 8–2 (2) | Choi Mu-Bae | Decision (unanimous) | World Victory Road Presents: Sengoku 9 | August 2, 2009 | 3 | 5:00 | Saitama, Saitama, Japan | |
| Loss | 7–2 (2) | Antônio Silva | TKO (knee injury) | World Victory Road Presents: Sengoku no Ran 2009 | January 4, 2009 | 1 | 1:42 | Saitama, Saitama, Japan | |
| Win | 7–1 (2) | Jim York | KO (punches) | World Victory Road Presents: Sengoku 2 | May 18, 2008 | 2 | 0:46 | Tokyo, Japan | |
| Win | 6–1 (2) | Edson Claas Vieira | Submission (neck crank) | PRIDE 34 | April 8, 2007 | 1 | 9:51 | Tokyo, Japan | |
| Loss | 5–1 (2) | Kazuhiro Nakamura | Decision (unanimous) | Pride FC - Final Conflict Absolute | September 10, 2006 | 3 | 5:00 | Saitama, Saitama, Japan | |
| Win | 5–0 (2) | Lee Eun-Soo | TKO (doctor stoppage) | Pride FC - Critical Countdown Absolute | July 1, 2006 | 1 | 4:16 | Tokyo, Japan | |
| NC | 4–0 (2) | Heath Herring | No Contest | K-1 Premium 2005 Dynamite | December 31, 2005 | 1 | 0:00 | Saitama, Saitama, Japan | Nakao kissed Herring during the pre-match stare-down, after which Herring knocked him out with a punch rendering him unable to continue. Originally ruled a DQ and overturned to a NC. |
| Win | 4–0 (1) | Fai Falamoe | Submission (armbar) | Hero's 3 | September 7, 2005 | 1 | 2:35 | Tokyo, Japan | |
| Win | 3–0 (1) | Don Frye | Decision (unanimous) | K-1 Premium 2004 Dynamite | December 31, 2004 | 3 | 5:00 | Tokyo, Japan | |
| Win | 2–0 (1) | Wesley Correira | Decision (split) | K-1 Rumble on the Rock 2004 | November 20, 2004 | 3 | 5:00 | Honolulu, Hawaii, United States | |
| NC | 1–0 (1) | Don Frye | No Contest (accidental headbutt) | K-1 MMA ROMANEX | May 22, 2004 | 1 | 0:00 | Saitama, Saitama, Japan | |
| Win | 1–0 | David Khakhaleishvili | KO (punches) | K-1 | November 20, 2003 | 2 | 1:13 | Nagoya, Japan | |

== K-1 kickboxing record ==
0 Wins - 1 Losses - 0 Draws
| Date | Result | Record | Opponent | Event | Method | Round |
| 6/14/2005 | Loss | 0–1 | (United States) Bob Sapp | K-1 World Grand Prix 2005 in Hiroshima | Decision (unanimous) | 3R |
