= List of 101 Dalmatian Street characters =

This is a list of characters in the animated television series 101 Dalmatian Street.

== Dalmatian family ==
Poster featuring the majority of the family.

The Dalmatian family consists of 101 Dalmatians (2 parents and 99 puppies), as the title of the series suggests. They all live at the titular 101 Dalmatian Street in Camden Town, London, UK.

=== Main siblings ===
Due to the large number of puppies in the family, the series focuses on 18 of the siblings.

==== Dylan ====
Dylan (voiced by Josh Brener) is the oldest son in the family and a pedantic control freak who dreams of being the first dog on Mars. Unlike Dolly and the other puppies, Dylan shows more responsibility and considers himself the leader of his siblings. However, he can also be pompous, neurotic and gullible, sometimes letting his wild imagination get the better of him. He is also somewhat pessimistic. He can come off as kind of condescending to his other siblings, mostly Dolly and sometimes Dawkins, but nonetheless cares deeply for them. He is very strict about the pups' safety and has a severe cat allergy.

==== Dolly ====
Dolly (voiced by Michaela Dietz) is the oldest daughter in the family and a rebellious tomboy who tends to have many outlandish ideas that end up causing trouble. Dolly is more carefree, outgoing, and adventurous than Dylan, but also impulsive and irresponsible. Still, she tries to be a good helper and is ultimately loyal to the rest of her family, and, unlike her brother, is shown to be level-headed and rational in times of crisis. She frequently picks on Dylan because of his geeky interests, particularly Poodlewolf—a canine take on Dungeons and Dragons—but eventually stops when she realizes how much the game means to her brother. She likes to perform tricks on her skateboard and has a crush on a Husky named Hansel, but in "A Summer to Remember" she is in love with a Doberman named Spike.

==== Dante ====
Dante (voiced by Kyle Soller) is a gloomy and paranoid goth who has black fur with white and purple spots. He sometimes panics due to his theories about the end of the world, but his predictions never come true, unless someone is helping him.

==== D.J. ====
D.J. (voiced by Maxwell Apple) is a music lover who can play any instrument.

==== Dimitri 1, 2, and 3 ====
Dimitri 1, 2, and 3 (all voiced by Rocco Wright) are a trio of brothers who love to cause trouble. They do not like cats.

==== Dawkins ====
Dawkins (voiced by Rhys-Issac Jones) is a science nerd and Dylan's unappreciated sidekick. Aside from Dylan and Dolly, he appears to be the pup with the most common sense.

==== Da Vinci ====
Da Vinci (voiced by Akiya Henry) is an artist with an odd vision, much like the Renaissance artist she is named after.

==== Deepak ====
Deepak (voiced by Nikhil Parmar) is a yin-yang colored Buddhist-like cat monk who tries hard to stay chill. He loves cats and wants to be a cat, and is able to keep the pups calm whenever they are in a panicking state.

==== Delgado ====
Delgado (voiced by Jack Binstead) is a puppy in a doggy wheelchair who has a charismatic personality and likes racing and sports. He is mainly seen playing with his sister Dolly.

==== Dizzy and Dee Dee ====
Dizzy (voiced by Nefeli Karakosta) and Dee Dee (voiced by Florrie Wilkinson) are a pair of mischievous sister puppies and Dolly's sidekicks. They tend to care the most about Dolly and Dylan.

==== Diesel ====
Diesel (voiced by Bert Davis) is a silly dirty unibrow puppy obsessed with digging tunnels in the dirt and or walls. He has a keen sense of smell.

==== Destiny, Dallas, and Déjà Vu ====
Destiny, Dallas, and Déjà Vu (voiced by Lauren Donzis, and Abigail Zoe Lewis), commonly referred to as Triple-D, are a trio of over-the-top triplets. They are divas who have a job acting in commercials together. Dallas is the "glam one," Destiny is the "deep intellectual who cares about the world," and Deja Vu is the goofy and ditzy triplet. They often talk in unison.

==== Dorothy ====
Dorothy (voiced by Margot Powell) is the youngest puppy in the family. She does not have any spots on her fur due to her young age and often gets into mischief, resulting in Dylan having to help her.

=== Caretakers ===
==== Doug ====
Doug (voiced by Rhashan Stone) is Delilah's husband and Dolly, Dylan and the pups’ father. He hails from America and works as a firefighter dog for the London Fire Brigade. He loves his puppies with all his heart, and has a very laid-back, light-hearted personality.

==== Delilah ====
Delilah (voiced by Ella Kenion) is Doug's wife and Dylan, Dolly and the pups' mother. She works as a nursing dog at the NHS (National Health Service). She is a direct descendant of Pongo and Perdita by a few generations.

=== Other siblings ===
The other puppies in the family are recurring background characters. They do not appear as often, and do not receive as much screen time as the main characters. The names of the other 81 siblings were all revealed in "In the House", the full version of a song from the official soundtrack of the series, which recalls all members of the Dalmatian family. Most of them look similar to each other, with the main difference being the colors of their collars. Their names are as follows:

- Desmond
- Delphie
- Dafydd
- Dinlo
- Donburi
- Declan
- Diana
- Ditto
- Denzel
- Dapple
- Domino
- Darby
- Darcy
- Dandy
- Donut
- Dodger
- Dara
- Demi
- Dimple
- Denim
- Dean
- Daoud
- Dingo
- Dieter
- Dijon
- Doreen
- Duffy
- Dobie
- Diamond
- Derek
- Dusty
- Dane
- Delta
- Dilma
- Dominique
- Duke
- Dechang
- Debbie-May
- Debbie-Lou
- Debbie-Lee
- Denver
- Devon
- Duck
- Dutch
- Duchess
- Drama
- Drew
- Dinga
- Donny
- Duncan
- Dax
- Dibs
- Disco
- Dixie
- Dubaku
- Diego
- Daphne
- Divya
- Doris
- Dvorak
- Dolce Vita
- Dalmar
- Drake
- Dupont
- Deneesha
- December
- Dai-ichi
- Donna-Maria
- Dionne
- Dulcinea
- Dalston
- Deuce
- Daley
- Dorset
- Desiree
- Darius
- Damian
- Durian
- Dani
- Dumpling
- Dakota

== Recurring ==
=== Animals ===
==== Fergus ====
Fergus (voiced by Conor MacNeill) is a sneaky and cunning red fox and Dylan's best friend, who originated from Ireland. Although it is not said where in Ireland he is from, it is believed that he came from Northern Ireland due to his Ulster accent.

==== Sid ====
Sid (voiced by Doc Brown) is a cheeky trickster squirrel who is obsessed with nuts. He lives in the forest with Fergus and Big Fee.

==== Big Fee ====
Big Fee (voiced by Aimee-Ffion Edwards) is a gothic rat who hangs out with Sid and Fergus.

==== Portia ====
Portia (voiced by Paloma Faith) is the coolest poodle pup in Camden Town. She is dark, intense, and has lots of attitude. She is also Dylan's former girlfriend, though Dylan still loves her.

==== Spencer ====
Spencer (voiced by Doc Brown) is a snarky and snooty dachshund who is Portia's sidekick and close friend.

==== Pearl ====
Pearl (voiced by Tameka Empson) is a female police horse who takes her job very seriously.

==== Prunella ====
Prunella (voiced by Bethan Wright) is a tan pug who wears a black collar with a pink flower on it. She is one of Clarissa's sidekicks and close friends.

==== Constantin ====
Constantin (voiced by Rufus Jones) is a cat that lives next door to the Dalmatians. He teaches yoga and is Deepak's mentor.

==== Hansel ====
Hansel (voiced by Rasmus Hardiker) is a handsome Polish-accented Siberian Husky who is Dolly's love interest. He loves poems and yoga.

==== Roxy ====
Roxy (voiced by Akiya Henry) is a large Rottweiler who is Dolly's best friend. Despite her intimidating size, she is actually very kind. She has a crush on Dylan, but Dylan rejects her.

==== Arabella ====
Arabella (voiced by Aimee-Ffion Edwards) is a Lhasa Apso and one of Clarissa's sidekicks and close friends.

==== Snowball ====
Snowball (voiced by Daniela Denby-Ashe) is a Pomeranian that is a friend of Dolly and Roxy. She speaks with a Slavic accent (in the short Disco Pups, she used the word nie; in Polish and Slovak this means 'no').

==== Spike ====
Spike (voiced by Olly Murs) is a young Dobermann that Dolly fell in love with during the family's holiday to Cornwall in "A Summer to Remember".

==== Summer ====
Summer (voiced by Aimee-Ffion Edwards) is a young Border Collie that Dylan fell in love with during the family's holiday to Cornwall in "A Summer to Remember".

=== Humans ===
==== Mr. Frizzy ====
Mr. Fuzzy (voiced by Matt Wilkinson) is a clumsy and easygoing man who lives in London who was brought to the 101 Dalmatian Street house by Dizzy and Dee Dee as Dylan's pet. He was supposed to help the dogs in cleaning the house, but eventually the Dalmatians decided that they could not keep him. Later, he met a girl and fell in love with her; now he sometimes appears as a minor or background character.

==== Doctor Dave ====
Doctor Dave (voiced by Stephen Mangan) is Delilah's human co-worker at the hospital. He knows she and her family live alone.

== Villains ==
=== Animals ===
==== Clarissa ====
Clarissa (voiced by Harriet Carmichael) is a very mean-spirited, spoiled rotten Corgi who is the next-door neighbor to the Dalmatians. She lives with her human, Hugo, who tends to act like a puppy. She hates the Dalmatian pups for ruining her peaceful moments and does everything she can to make their lives miserable, while claiming to be a proper lady. At the end of the series, though, she helped rescue the Dalmatian family because while she doesn't like them, she knew they didn't deserve to die because of Cruella de Vil.

==== Bessie ====
Bessie (voiced by Miriam Margolyes) is a smart and devious cow, but appears to be a harmless, sweet, and simple local.

==== Cuddles ====
Cuddles is Hunter de Vila's pet cat and sidekick. Hunter later disowns Cuddles when he betrays him in the episode "The De Vil Wears Puppies".

=== Humans ===
==== Cruella de Vil ====
Cruella de Vil (voiced by Michelle Gomez) is the main antagonist of the series and the entire franchise. Her voice is first heard at the end of "A Date with Destiny… Dallas and Déjà Vu", and a number of later episodes featured her voice as well. Her first partial appearance is at the end of "Better The De Vil You Know", but later on her full appearance is finally seen in "The De Vil Wears Puppies", when she invades the house and scares all the puppies, presumably looking to capture them as she attempted with their ancestors. However, due to her cruel behavior and betrayal of Hunter, Hunter betrays Cruella and helps the Dalmatian family. Cruella is eventually arrested at the end of the episode for pet cruelty. Despite nearly being 100 years old in 2019, the present time in the show, Cruella still looks fit and agile, while also becomes bald and wears a wig. Instead of her cigarette holder, she uses a perfume that hides her signs of aging with a layer of makeup.

==== Hunter de Vil ====
Hunter de Vil (voiced by Joshua LeClair) is a young photographer and Cruella's great-nephew, who initially appears as a background character until he gains a prominent role in "The Nose Job", in which he is revealed to be responsible for the recent vandalism at the park and congratulates his cat for finding the Dalmatian family. In "London, We Have a Problem", he played a bigger role when he befriended Dylan in having a common love for outer space. Hunter kidnapped Dorothy so Dylan could find her and tricked him into leading him to their house. He used a large vacuum to trap the puppies and put them in a shipping container to take them to Switzerland, but he was overpowered by Dylan and Dolly who saved the puppies by saying the trigger word "dinner". Hunter himself was then locked in the container and went to Switzerland. He became a dog version of himself, so Dylan was able to trick him. He later finds out that Cruella was using him, and she never loved him. He was unaware that she was planning to kill the puppies for her coat. As he was being thrown into the same container with all the other puppies, he told them how he suffered for six months and that Cruella never called once. Hunter described how alone he was, resulting in the puppies feeling sympathy for him. He later turns against Cruella and helps save all the other puppies.
