= Living It =

Living It may refer to:

- Living It (TV series), a CBBC school drama series
- Living It (album), an album by Dorinda Clark-Cole
