= Kerfoot =

Kerfoot is a surname. Notable people with the surname include:

- Alexander Kerfoot (born 1994), Canadian ice hockey player
- Benjamin Kerfoot (born 1992), English actor
- Eric Kerfoot (1924–1980), English footballer
- John Barrett Kerfoot (1816–1881), American Anglican bishop
- John D. Kerfoot (1835–1903), American lawyer and businessman
