= Mia & Codie =

Animated educational children's series

Mia & Codie is an animated educational children's television series created by Don Moody. Co-produced with Epic Story Media and animated by Relish Studios, both based in Canada, the series is designed to introduce preschoolers to foundational thinking skills, cognitive development, computational thinking skills, and artificial intelligence (AI) literacy. Elements of the series align with concepts explored in the Codie Blocks learning system, including pattern recognition, sequencing, cause-and-effect, problem-solving, and logic.

The series premiered in Canada on TVOKids, TFO, and Knowledge Network in 2021. In the United States, the series began airing in 2025 on PBS member stations through distribution by American Public Television. In Europe, the series is represented by DeAPlaneta Entertainment for distribution. The series has received funding support from the Shaw Rocket Fund, a nonprofit that funds children's media. For its second season, Scratch, the world's largest creative learning community for kids, joined the series as a sponsor.

== Plot ==
The series follows Mia, an eight-year-old girl who loves to code, and Codie, a bro-bot she built to be the younger brother she always wanted. Together, they solve everyday problems by using coding concepts such as sequencing, debugging, prompting, and loops. The characters often use the catchphrase "Run the Code!" to initiate their solutions.

Similar to Moody's previous series WordWorld, which embedded letters into objects to teach literacy, Mia & Codie visualizes abstract digital concepts through physical comedy and tangible examples to make them accessible to early learners.

== Cast & Characters ==
- Mia (voiced by Kiara Pariag): A curious, creative 8-year-old girl who loves coding and serves as the show's primary problem solver.
- Codie (voiced by Mason McLoughlin): A "bro-bot" (brother robot) built by Mia. He is durable, adventurous, and executes the commands Mia programs.
- Evu (voiced by Tyler Hyrchuk): An excitable emu who often joins Mia and Codie on their adventures. He has an active imagination and often responds with great enthusiasm.
- Velvet (voiced by Nneka Atto): A spirited elephant who loves to dance, cheer, and perform. She is warm-hearted, expressive, and supportive of Mia and Codie.

== Episodes ==
The series consists of two seasons, each containing 20 short-form episodes of approximately four minutes. Season 1 premiered in 2025, while Season 2 is scheduled for release in mid 2026. For broadcast in the United States and on some international platforms, the segments are commonly compiled into 14-minute episodes, typically with three stories grouped together.

=== Series Overview ===
Season	Episodes	Originally released
1	20	July 2, 2024
2	20	April 1, 2026

== Reception ==
Mia & Codie has received positive responses for its STEM learning focus and age-appropriate content for young children. It has been reviewed by Common Sense Media which described the series as charming and educational with engaging characters.

In 2024, the series was recognized as a finalist for the Cartoons on the Bay Pulcinella Awards in the Upper Preschool category.
