= Helen Schlesinger =

British actress

- Born: 1964 (age 61–62); London, United Kingdom
- Education: Wadham College, Oxford; Drama Studio London
- Occupation: Actress

Helen Schlesinger (born 1964) is a British stage and television actress. In film and on television, she has appeared in 24 Hour Party People (2002), Rose and Maloney (2004), Sex Traffic and Dirty War (2004), Sensitive Skin (2005), Trial & Retribution (2006), Merlin (2012), The Hour (2013), and Lewis (2015).

== Early life ==
Schlesinger was born in London, and raised near Windsor, Berkshire. She earned a First Degree in English at Wadham College, Oxford. She further studied at the Drama Studio London.

== Stage ==
After working on the fringe in London (Finborough, the Old Red Lion) Schlesinger joined Compass Theatre Company and toured for two years, mainly Shakespeare, throughout the country and abroad. She played Juliet, Miranda, Hermione, Hamlet in Hamlet and Mosca in Ben Jonson's Volpone.

Schlesinger began working in repertory theatre. Her roles included Gilda in Design For Living in Harrogate, Miss Julie in Plymouth, the title role in The Second Mrs Tanqueray at Salisbury Playhouse, and Jane in Wild Oats in the first production at the West Yorkshire Playhouse. After moving to London, Helen appeared in Becket at the Haymarket with Derek Jacobi and Robert Lindsay. She then joined Shared Experience, playing Maggie Tulliver in their production of The Mill on the Floss, which played at the Tricycle Theatre and Lyric Hammersmith.

She went on to work with Shared Experience again at the National Theatre, playing Maria in War and Peace. There she also appeared in Inadmissible Evidence, An Inspector Calls (at the Garrick Theatre) and, a few years later, as Clytemnestra in The Oresteia. Helen played Viola in Twelfth Night and Portia in The Merchant of Venice for the Royal Shakespeare Company in Stratford and the Barbican.

She has worked extensively at the Royal Exchange in Manchester playing Goneril in King Lear and Yelena in Uncle Vanya (both with Tom Courtenay); Josie in A Moon for the Misbegotten (winner and nominee Best Actress Manchester Evening News and Regional Theatre Awards); and Elsa in The Road to Mecca. At the Royal Court productions, appearances include Wild East by April de Angelis and The Stone by Marius Von Mayenburg and Fireface at the Young Vic by the latter playwright. Productions at Hampstead Theatre include Comfort Me with Apples by Nell Leyshon and Skane by Pamela Carter and at the Bush Theatre Whipping It Up by Steve Thompson, which transferred to the Ambassadors Theatre.

Helen played Elizabeth Proctor in The Crucible for the RSC (which transferred from Stratford to the Gielgud Theatre) for which she won Best Supporting Actress at the Whatsonstage Awards. At the Donmar Warehouse, Helen played Sicinius in their recent production of Coriolanus and Elizabeth in Alexi Kaye Campbell's Bracken Moor at the Tricycle Theatre. In 1988 Helen played HRH and Coral Browne in Alan Bennett's Single Spies at the Rose Theatre Kingston, and she appeared in Bryony Lavery's Frozen at the Park Theatre. Recently, she played Jane Jacobs in Straight Line Crazy at the Bridge Theatre.

On television she has appeared in 24 Hour Party People (2002), Sex Traffic and Dirty War (2004), Sensitive Skin (2005),Trial & Retribution (2006), Merlin (2012), The Hour (2013), Lewis (2015).

Schlesinger lives in Battersea with her newspaper editor partner, Richard Addis, and her two sons, Theo and Sebastian.

== TV ==
- Ted Lasso as Elain Pinter
- Midsomer Murders as Serena Wyham, S18E6 "Harvest of Souls" (2016)
- Lewis as Vivienne Tedman, "One for Sorrow" Part 1 & 2 (2015)
- EastEnders as Judge Alex Madeley (2014)
- The Hour as Henrietta Williams (2 episodes, 2013)
- Merlin as Befelen (1 episode, 2012)
- Doctors (2010–2017) as Rochelle "Carousel", Part 1-5 (2010) as Louise Ernest "The Importance if Iain Ernest" (2017)
- Casualty as Helen (2012)
- Nativity as Rachel (2011)
- Criminal Justice ll as Gillian, 2 episodes (2010)
- Trial & Retribution as Dr. Harriet Simmons, "Sins of the Father" Part 1&2 (2006)
- Sensitive Skin as Masha, 1 episode (2005)
- Doctors as Rebecca Matthias (1 episode, 2005)
- Living It as Vet, "Instant Karma" (2005)
- Bad Girls: Most Wanted (2004) as Tessa Spall (archive footage)
- The Bill as Katie Parlour/Ms Daniels, "Dealer Wins" (1994), "253 Friendly Fire" Part 1 (2004)
- Holby City as Joyce Alan, "Happy Families" (2004)
- Sex Traffic (2004) as Language School Secretary, 2 episodes
- Dirty War (2004) as Nicola Painswick, Minister for London
- Waking the Dead as Rebecca Jacobs, "Anger Management"bipartisanship 1 & 2 (2004)
- Rose and Maloney as Alison Francis, "George Parris" Part 1 (2004)
- 24 Hour Party People (2002) as Hilary
- The Way We Live Now as Madame Melmotte, 4 episodes (2001)
- Bad Girls as Tessa Spall, "Mistaken Identity" (2000), "The Turn if the Screw" (2001)
- The Greatest Store in the World (1999) as Miss Greystone, TV Movie
- Casualty as Anna Cropley (1 episode, 1997)
- Persuasion (1995) as Mrs. Smith
- Devil's Advocate (1995) as Katerina Marzio, TV Movie
- Between The Lines as Dr. Helen Reynolds, Episode: "Blooded" (1994)
- The Cormorant (1993) as Mary Talbot
- Harnessing Peacocks (1992) as Cara
