= Killer Bitch =

- DVD cover (UK)
- Directed by: Liam Galvin
- Written by: Liam Galvin
- Produced by: Liam Galvin; Yvette Rowland
- Starring: Yvette Rowland; Robin Reid; Alex Reid; Cass Pennant; Carlton Leach; Dave Courtney; Roy Shaw; Ben Dover; Kate Elizabeth Hallam
- Music by: Electric Eel Shock; Stefano Barone; Will Crewdson; Dead Family; Dean Rees; The Hyads; Isaac's Aircraft; MC Spanish Fly; Pussycat & The Dirty Johnsons; Rachel Stamp; Rotten Ped; Serotonin; Sid Sings; Sweet Felicity Arkwright
- Distributed by: Kaleidoscope Home Entertainment
- Release date: 3 May 2010
- Running time: 92 minutes
- Country: United Kingdom
- Language: English

Killer Bitch is a 2010 British action-horror film written and directed by Liam Galvin and produced by Yvette Rowland, Liam Galvin, and John Fleming. The film contains a real sex scene featuring Ben Dover which was filmed as hardcore porn but edited to softcore for the final cut of the film. It also features a controversial sex scene with Alex Reid.

== Plot ==
A woman is forced into a deadly game in which she has to kill five people. If she fails, all her friends and family will be butchered.

== Notoriety ==
The film became notorious in the UK in August 2009, shortly after shooting started, when tabloid newspapers the News of the World and The People carried stories implying that the film's star, Katie Price's then-boyfriend Alex Reid had been involved in a "vile" rape scene and that Killer Bitch was a pornographic film. This was challenged by Price who said that neither she nor Reid would in any way be involved in a film glorifying rape as she herself had been raped. This further stoked controversy.

Reid was subsequently reported to have 'walked off' from the film leaving several of his scenes un-shot.

The film featured crime figures& football hooligans: Dave Courtney, Roy Shaw, Howard Marks, Carlton Leach, Jason Marriner, Cass Pennant, Norman Buckland (The Guv'nor') as well as Page 3 models, boxers, cage fighters and martial arts competitors. The publicity storm surrounding the film in the UK was stoked around the world including Australia, the Middle East, India and the United States. and when, during post-production, Alex Reid won the British TV series Celebrity Big Brother.

Further controversy surrounded the film in March 2010 when the British Board of Film Classification, after four screenings, was said to be unhappy about the film's sexual content and would demand cuts to Alex Reid's sex scene with actress and producer Yvette Rowland. In fact, they passed the whole film uncut with an '18' certificate.

The original publicity for the film had said it involved real fights, real criminals, real sex; after release, the film's executive producer claimed "the movie features real violence, real gangsters and real hardcore sex scenes".

== Reception ==
Reviewing the film, James Benefield of the Eye For Film website stated "None of the acting - including the stunt casting - is up to much... with such a dull premise and script, it's surprising Liam Galvin has assembled this notorious cast. The film's main loser is the viewer seeking it out on the back of the publicity generated by this casting."
