= The Secret of Eel Island =

- Starring: Luke Ward-Wilkinson; Elysia Lukoszevieze; John Ringham
- Country of origin: United Kingdom
- Original language: English
- No. of series: 2
- No. of episodes: 30

Production
- Producer: Charles Gauvain

Original release
- Network: Channel Five
- Release: 2004 – 2006

The Secret of Eel Island is a Channel Five drama series, that revolves around the secret of Eel Island, The first series contained twelve episodes and the second series thirteen episodes.

== Cast ==
- Ben Kerfoot as Malachite

== Episode list ==
=== Series 1 ===
No. overall	No. in series	Title	Original release date
1	1	"The Secret"	?
2	2	"Lost and Found"	?
3	3	"Horse Power"	?
4	4	"Big Fish"	?
5	5	"Rain"	?
6	6	"Treasure"	?
7	7	"Two for Joy"	?
8	8	"Birthday"	?
9	9	"Eels"	?
10	10	"Mora's Story"	?
11	11	"Shadows"	?
12	12	"The Promise"	?

=== Series 2 ===
No. overall	No. in series	Title	Original release date
14	1	"The Return"	?
15	2	"Signs"	?
16	3	"One of the Family"	?
17	4	"Wishes"	?
18	5	"Look Behind You"	?
19	6	"Ghost Story"	?
20	7	"Nature's Cure"	?
21	8	"Fishy Tale"	?
22	9	"Hero Homer"	?
23	10	"Heroes and Villains"	?
24	11	"Waste Not, Want Not"	?
25	12	"Shadow on the Sun"	?
26	13	"Coming Home"	?
