= 101 Dalmatian Street =

Animated television series

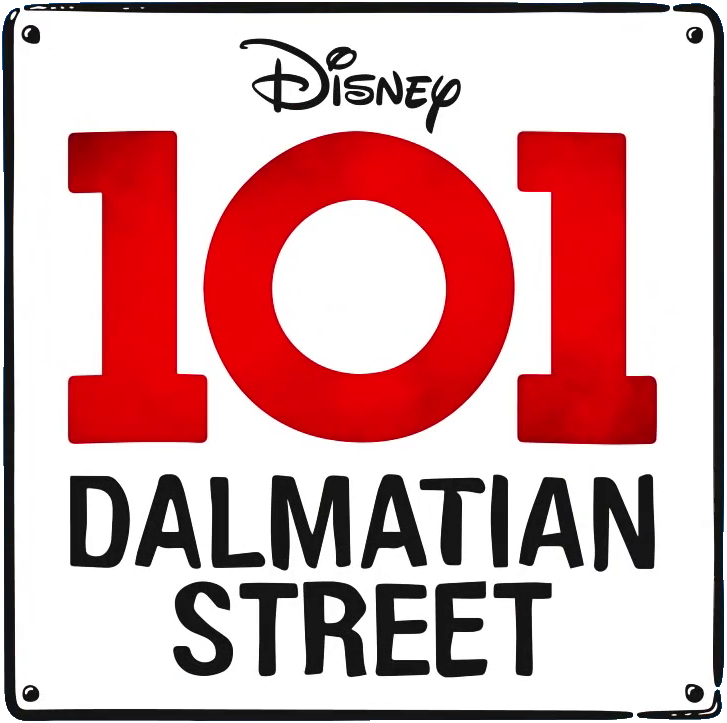
- Genre: Comedy
- Created by: Miklos Weigert
- Based on: Disney's 101 Dalmatians by Bill Peet; The Hundred and One Dalmatians by Dodie Smith
- Developed by: Anttu Harlin; Joonas Utti
- Written by: Maria O'Loughlin
- Directed by: Miklos Weigert
- Voices of: Josh Brener; Michaela Dietz; Rhashan Stone; Ella Kenion
- Theme music composer: Johnathan P. Rende; Kathryn D. Rende
- Opening theme: "I Got My Pups with Me" by Johnathan P. Rende and Kathryn D. Rende
- Ending theme: "It's a Dog's Life" by Celica Gray Westbrook, Doug Petty, and Paula Winger
- Composers: Nathan Klein; Rupert Cross; Theo Vidgen
- Country of origin: United Kingdom
- Original language: English
- No. of series: 1
- No. of episodes: 26 (47 segments)

Production
- Executive producer: Cara Speller
- Producer: Karen Doyle
- Animator: Michael Brady (director)
- Running time: 11 minutes (Note: Stitched into two segments of 22 minutes on the Disney+ release and Disney XD broadcast in the US.)
- Production company: Passion Animation Studios

Original release
- Network: Disney Channel
- Release: 18 March 2019 – 22 February 2020

Related
- 101 Dalmatians: The Series

101 Dalmatian Street is a British animated television series created by Miklos Weigert that aired on Disney Channel in the UK and Ireland from 18 March 2019 to 22 February 2020. It is produced by Passion Animation Studios and animated by Atomic Cartoons in Canada and features the voices of Josh Brener, Michaela Dietz, Rhashan Stone and Ella Kenion.

It is loosely based on the 1956 novel The Hundred and One Dalmatians by Dodie Smith and in Disney's film franchise. It is the second television series, following 101 Dalmatians: The Series, to be based on the franchise. The series is set almost 60 years after the original 1961 film, 101 Dalmatians, and follows a large family of 101 Dalmatians who live at the title address in Camden Town, London.

A graphic novel based on the series by Papercutz, D Is for Dalmatians, was released on 15 October 2024.

== Premise ==
101 Dalmatian Street centers around a large family of 99 Dalmatian puppies whose names begin with the letter "D", and their parents, Doug and Delilah, the latter of whom is a great-great-granddaughter of Pongo and Perdita. They often leave the eldest siblings, Dylan and Dolly, in charge while they are busy at work. The dalmatians live by themselves at 101 Dalmatian Street, located in Camden Town, London in the 21st century, with no human supervision as their owner Dodie Smith, an eccentric billionaire, left them her house and went to live on an island.

== Voice cast ==
=== Main ===
- Josh Brener as Dylan
- Michaela Dietz as Dolly
- Rhashan Stone as Doug
- Ella Kenion as Delilah
- Nefeli Karakosta as Dizzy
- Florrie Wilkinson as Dee Dee
- Rhys Isaac-Jones as Dawkins
- Bert Davis as Diesel
- Kyle Soller as Dante
- Lauren Lindsey Donzis as Destiny and Déjà Vu
- Abigail Zoe Lewis as Dallas
- Jack Binstead as Delgado
- Maxwell Apple as D.J.
- Nikhil Parmar as Deepak
- Akiya Henry as Da Vinci
- Margot Powell as Dorothy
- Rocco Wright as Dimitri 1, 2 and 3

=== Recurring ===
- Harriet Carmichael as Clarissa the Corgi and Fetch
- Doc Brown as Sid the Squirrel and Spencer Sausage Dog
- Conor MacNeill as Fergus the Fox
- Rasmus Hardiker as Hansel the Husky
- Paloma Faith as Portia Poodle
- Tameka Empson as Pearl the Police Horse
- Aimee-Ffion Edwards as Arabella, Big Fee and Summer
- Rufus Jones as Constantin
- Bethan Wright as Prunella Pug
- Akiya Henry as Roxy
- Daniela Denby-Ashe as Snowball
- Joshua LeClair as Hunter De Vil
- Michelle Gomez as Cruella De Vil
- Stephen Mangan as Doctor Dave
- Olly Murs as Spike the Cornish Doberman
- Miriam Margolyes as Bessie the Cornish Cow

== Production ==
101 Dalmatian Street is based on a pitch by Anttu Harlin and Joonas Utti of Finland's Gigglebug Entertainment to Disney's original animation team in London. The team developed the plot with Passion Animation Studios, which produces the series. Animation on the episodes was done by Atomic Cartoons, a Vancouver, British Columbia, Canada-based studio, while a number of shorts starring the characters were produced by Gigglebug. Although the show was produced with digital animation, the characters are designed with a hand-drawn outline, looking reminiscent to the original xerography look of the film. The creators claimed at the Annecy International Animated Film Festival that they purposefully never watched the direct-to-video sequel, live-action movies or the original series, and only watched the original movie. They often had to cheat when it came down to keeping up with 99 dogs, so there are some shots where the number of puppies go way beyond 101.

Miklos Weigert serves as the chief director of the series, with Maria O'Loughlin as the head writer and Cara Speller as the executive producer. The series had 26 episodes ordered.

== Episodes ==
=== Pilot (2017) ===
Title	Directed by	Written by	Storyboarded by	Produced date
"London, We Have a Problem"	Miklos Weigert	Maria O'Loughlin	Ravi Swami	7 February 2017
"London, We Have a Problem"	Miklos Weigert	Maria O'Loughlin	Khalil Ben Naamane & Uli Meyer	7 February 2017
An early storyboarded version of what would later become the 14th produced episode of the series. The character designs are different when compared to the final show, and there are some differences in the plot with Hunter wearing a fur coat and no mention of Cruella. It was leaked online in April 2024 alongside other pilots and production pieces from Disney and Cartoon Network.

=== Series (2019–20) ===
No.	Title	Directed by	Written by	Storyboarded by	Original release date	American Disney XD air date	Prod. code	U.S. viewers (millions)
1	"Dog's Best Friend" "A Dog's Best Friend"	Miklos Weigert	Giles Pilbrow	Barry Reynolds	18 March 2019 (Note: "Dog's Best Friend" premiered as a sneak peek on 14 December 2018.)	29 March 2021	101	0.05
1	"Boom Night"	Miklos Weigert	Kirsty Peart & Jess Kedward	Max Loubaresse	18 March 2019	29 March 2021	101	0.05
While cleaning the house after the pups made a mess, Dylan notices about his next-door neighbour Clarissa having a human doing chores, and he wishes that he had a human "pet" to do all of his chores for him. Dizzy and Dee Dee overhear, and decide to bring him one of whom they nicknamed "Mr. Fuzzy". They take him to 101 Dalmatian Street, much to Dylan's surprise as he tries to get him out of the house. He eventually warms up to the human and sees this as an opportunity to train him to do chores, but to no avail. The commotion from Mr. Fuzzy wakes Doug up, who discovers Dylan let a human into the house and he immediately lectures him. Later, after making a bigger mess of the household, Dylan follows his father's advice and brings him back "with his own kind". He lures Mr. Fuzzy outside by stealing his phone and bringing it to the park, where the human meets a vendor from a dating app he was using and the two look into each other's eyes. Doug and Delilah are getting prepared for "Boom Night" by locking the house, and putting earmuffs on their children. They tell Dylan and Dolly to keep the pups safe as they head off to work. Dylan insists that he is in charge and commands the puppies to stay inside the house, but Dolly doesn't take him seriously and decides to hang out on the barge. Dorothy notices that Dolly left the door open as she left and follows her. When Dylan discovers that she is missing, he decides to leave the house to find her as Dolly arrives at the barge. Dylan finds Dolly and later spot Dorothy at the top of a building without any earmuffs. They attempt to save her by running up their building, but Dolly gets stuck in the entry to the top of the building. After she calls out a trigger word ("ball"), the onslaught of puppies is enough to break her free. When all the puppies land on the top, they realize that Boom Night isn't as bad as they thought as they are in awe at the fireworks, which was the source of the booming. Note: When this episode aired, "Boom Night" was shown first before "Dog's Best Friend". Later airings corrected this error.
2	"Power to the Puppies"	Miklos Weigert	Baljeet Rai	Daniel Dion Christensen	19 March 2019	29 March 2021	102A	0.05
Dylan and Dolly are fighting over whose puppy-sitting style is better. At Doug's suggestion, they decide to hold an election to see who should be the top dog. While the voting is close, the puppies prefer the incredibly inept Diesel who only seems interested in digging. Dylan stays in his treehouse despite Dante's warning of danger and Dolly tries feeding ideas into Diesel, but he instead digs and hits a water valve. Dolly gets Dylan to get the puppies to all work together to drain out the house and clean it up with Dolly admitting that rules should be put in place and Dylan admitting that he uses too many, and the two of them agreeing that both deserve to be top dog.
3	"Who the Dog Do You Think You Are?"	Miklos Weigert	Ciaran Morrison & Mick O'Hara	Luke Allen	20 March 2019	29 March 2021	102B	0.05
The dalmatians discover a painting in the attic of a royal dog who looks like Dylan. Everyone, minus Dolly, believes he is of royal lineage. Clarissa, overhearing them, barges into their home with Prunella and Arabella and pamper Dylan. Anyone opposing him is immediately kicked out of the house. Dylan soon grows bored and learns of Clarissa's actions as well as her plan to marry him. Dylan gets Dolly to destroy the marriage license, but Clarissa made copies. The painting turns out to be fake and Clarissa and her troupe leave the dalmatians.
4	"Walkies on the Wild Side" (Note: Originally called "Walk on the Wild Side")	Miklos Weigert	Ciaran Morrison & Mick O'Hara	Barry Reynolds	21 March 2019	30 March 2021	103A	0.03
Dylan has trouble keeping up with Dolly and Fergus's wildness. He accepts Fergus' offer on being taught how to survive on the streets, leaving Dolly on single sitter duty back at home, much to her irritation. While he has trouble settling into the lifestyle with Fergus and the Canal Crew, Dylan takes to the life well but misses home. To get out of the rain, he gets on a cat lady's barge, but it begins to take off. Dolly and the Canal Crew arrive just in time to get Dylan to unleash his inner wild side and escape. While he enjoyed the festivities, Dylan prefers to stay at home.
5	"May Contain Nuts"	Miklos Weigert	Giles Pilbrow	Bianca Ansems	25 March 2019	30 March 2021	103B	0.03
Dolly becomes amazed at Sid the Squirrel's parkour talents and begs to be trained. She enjoys her new athletic abilities, but Dylan begins to suspect that Sid is only after one thing: nuts. Dolly pays no mind to Dylan's concerns and continues to take part in many of Sid's "tests" which are actually just schemes to get more nuts. After dodging a nail clipping session, Dolly ends up helping Sid rob a store and they are chased in the streets. Dolly ends up hanging from a church tower clock and Dylan and the dalmatians rescue her while Sid gets "arrested".
6	"Winter Funderland"	Miklos Weigert	Nicole Paglia	Max Loubaresse	26 March 2019	30 March 2021	104A	0.07
The dalmatians prepare for a major snowstorm, only to be disappointed that it is nothing but rain. Dolly gets an idea to make it snow inside and recruits Dawkins to freeze the interior of their home so that it can freeze. They invite everyone over for a party, much to Dylan's irritation. Eventually, everything gets out of control and Dolly, Dylan and Dawkins unfreeze the boiler so that everything can warm up. As their parents arrive home, they further heat up the interior so that the water can turn into steam, creating a tropical interior which Delilah said she wanted.
7	"Snow Day"	Miklos Weigert	Josh Sager & Jerome Simpson	Luke Allen	27 March 2019	30 March 2021	104B	0.07
London suddenly has a snow day, but Doug and Delilah want to prep all of the puppies so that they can prepare for the weather. Dylan and Dolly growing bored of the long procedure take half of the puppies and challenge the parents to prep them. The parents win, but Dorothy is nowhere to be found, having been accidentally been let out by Dolly. Doug, Delilah, Dylan and Dolly search endlessly and find her hiding in a snowman, but a snow plower is about to run her over. The family rescues her, but the snow melts into mud which still does not prevent them from having fun.
8	"Perfect Match"	Miklos Weigert	Kirsty Peart & Jess Kedward	Adrian Maganza	28 March 2019	31 March 2021	105A	0.03
Dolly is shocked to learn that her friend Roxy Rottweiler has a crush on Dylan. She decides to hook the two up as a practical joke, but Dylan, who initially started off frightened of Roxy, begins to appreciate her presence when she displays an interest in constellation watching. Dolly begins to envy the two of them together and tries to break them up, unaware of the fact that Roxy had prepared an apology tent for her. After Dolly attacks the two with a water hose, she learns the truth and apologizes while Roxy loses interest in Dylan when he refers to her as a sometimes friend.
9	"All Fired Up" (Note: Originally called "Daddies 'n' Daughters")	Miklos Weigert	Suzanne Lang	Barry Reynolds	1 April 2019	31 March 2021	105B	0.03
As part of taking your child to work day, Doug invites Dolly after choosing at random. When Dolly arrives at the fire station, she is shocked to discover that it is an incredibly boring place. She tries to energize the firemen, but she puts them all to sleep. Meanwhile, Dylan tries to have time to himself, but his cat allergy begins acting up when the next-door neighbour cats are holding a Japanese themed party. His telescope starts a fire and Doug and Dolly manage to wake up the firemen in time to rush to Dalmatian Street to put out the fire and rescue Dylan and the cats.
10	"Poetry Scam" (Note: Originally called "Puppy Love")	Miklos Weigert	Josh Sager & Jerome Simpson	Bianca Ansems	2 April 2019	31 March 2021	106A	0.05
Dolly tries to impress her crush Hansel but is too nervous. She discovers that he is attracted to Dylan's poetry and begins repeating it to him as her own. Dylan finds out and decides to help her by feeding poetry to her while she is talking to Hansel. He becomes so impressed that he invites her to a slam poetry session. Dolly begins to perform, but cannot bring herself to continue copying her brother, so she invites him to perform while she goes into an impromptu rap poem, known as "Dolly's Rap". Hansel is nevertheless impressed and begins conversing with Dylan of whom he begins to admire.
11	"Crushed Out"	Miklos Weigert	Kirsty Peart & Jess Kedward	Max Loubaresse	3 April 2019	31 March 2021	106B	0.05
Dylan has a crush on a goth poodle named Portia. Because Dylan is a nerd, Fergus decides to turn Dylan into a goth so that Portia will like him. She is impressed with him, even though she thinks his name is "Danny", but her assistant Spencer warns Dylan that Portia is unpredictable. Not only is Portia incredibly dark, but she is also clingy and continues to stalk Dylan. He decides to revert to his nerdy ways, but she instead takes to it as some sort of new style. With Dolly's help, Dylan begins showering Portia with affection and she leaves. However, Dylan still has a crush on her.
12	"Girls' Day Out"	Miklos Weigert	Jacqueline Moody	Althea Aseoche	4 April 2019	1 April 2021	107A	0.09
Dolly's plan to surprise Delilah on Mother's Day goes up in smoke when she angrily chastises her in a botched attempt while accidentally praising Dylan, resulting in a hurt and insulted Dolly disowning her mother. Realizing her mistake, Delilah reluctantly takes up Doug's offer to go to the spa with her. Delilah sticks her neck out for Dolly when Clarissa insults them. Later, they cause a mess and Delilah and Dolly come out looking like hyenas. They are picked up by a woman who plans to send them to the Serengeti. After making up with one another for how they acted earlier, they manage to successfully escape and go home.
13	"The Woof Factor"	Miklos Weigert	Josh Sager & Jerome Simpson	Bianca Ansems	22 April 2019	1 April 2021	107B	0.09
Triple D (Destiny, Dallas and Déjà Vu) accidentally double book two commercial spots. Fearing that they will not get the money to literally keep a roof over their heads, Dylan, Dolly and Deepak attend one of the commercials posing as Triple-D. Everything that can go wrong, does go wrong as the unfamiliarity with the sets as well as the comic blunders forces the three to realize all the hard work and dedication that goes into being superstars. When it seems that everything falls apart, Triple-D comes to the rescue and the dalmatians are able to finally fix the roof.
14	"The Nose Job" (Parts 1 and 2)	Miklos Weigert	Giles Pilbrow	Adrian Maganza	23 April 2019	1 April 2021	108	0.10
15	"The Nose Job" (Parts 1 and 2)	Miklos Weigert	Giles Pilbrow	Max Loubaresse	24 April 2019	1 April 2021	108	0.10
Part 1: Dylan enters a sniffing contest after training his nose but is shocked when Diesel, who has had absolutely no training and is not all that bright, easily beats him. To make matters worse, Pearl the Police Horse bans the dalmatians from going to the park after all the flowers have been ripped up and the statue defaced with paw prints. Dylan refuses to have Diesel help him and he scours the city looking for potential culprits all of whom turn out to be innocent. After some persuading from Dolly, Dylan finally has Diesel help, but he cannot identify a smell at the crime scene. Dylan and Dolly see flower petals in Diesel's bed and the former waits at night. He sees Diesel sneaking out of the house, but he is actually sleepwalking. Pearl arrives, believing that he was returning to the scene of the crime and promptly arrests him. Part 2: Dylan tries to get Pearl to listen to him about Diesel's sleepwalking, but she refuses to listen to him. He recruits Dolly and the other dalmatians to break Diesel out of prison, unaware of the fact that someone is spying on them. After hearing that a cat tipped them off to the crime, Dylan and Diesel confront Constantin, but he denies any turning the dalmatians in and tells them that there was another cat at the park. Diesel reveals that he did catch a rubbery smell and that the reason that they did not get the cat smell was that he was hairless (Dylan is allergic to cat fur and could not smell it). Pearl follows them to the park and they find the culprit, but he escapes in a limo. The dalmatians celebrate clearing Diesel, but the cat's owner is revealed to be after the dalmatians.
16	"My Fair Dolly"	Miklos Weigert	Maria O'Loughlin	Althea Aseoche	25 April 2019	2 April 2021	109A	0.04
While playing on the trampoline, Clarissa beckons Dolly to be more proper instead of rambunctious. With Dawkins and Dylan's help, she learns to be a pedigree type dog; changing her look and mannerisms through a series of tests. Dolly tries to enter the Petiquette Pooch Cup, but she does not have an owner, so she goes to the park and picks a fashionista. When she begins to act snooty towards her siblings, Dylan, Dawkins and the rest try to talk sense into her, but she refuses to listen. Upon seeing Dizzy and Dee-Dee acting like her, she reverts to her wild self and gets dirty with her siblings with the other dogs, minus Clarissa, following suit.
17	"Flea-Mageddon" (Note: Originally called "Outbreak")	Miklos Weigert	Nicole Paglia	Bianca Ansems	29 April 2019	2 April 2021	109B	0.04
In a spoof of 28 Days Later, Dylan learns that the rest of his siblings did not take a bath like they were supposed to, resulting in many of them getting fleas. Similar to a zombie epidemic, Dylan, Dolly, Dawkins, Dante and Dorothy are left with Clarissa mocking them next door. As they do not have flea powder, they try to survive, but soon the fleas begin to spread. Eventually, Dylan, Dolly and Dawkins are left hiding in the treehouse and discover, to their shock, that the fleas came from Dylan's moon rock that was given to him by Clarissa. Dylan absorbs all the fleas and bounces over to Clarissa's house, giving them all to her.
18	"A Right Royal Rumble"	Jez Hall	Ciaran Morrison & Mick O'Hara	Barry Reynolds	17 August 2019	2 April 2021	110A	0.05
The dalmatians prepare for the arrival of the Royal Corgis in their caravan, but Clarissa's owner Hugo has made a deal with the government to allow himself to build a viewing wall that blocks the viewpoint of the dalmatians. Pearl's hooves are tied as she is in the running to get a promotion and wants to impress her superior Apollo. Dylan and Dolly decide to sabotage the wall with their siblings, but end up blocking the caravan's path. At the last minute, the dalmatians use ice cream cones to make that new path and the Corgis are impressed with them, while Clarissa and Hugo are made to look like fools.
19	"Dal-Martians"	Jez Hall	Ciaran Morrison & Mick O'Hara	Adrian Maganza	18 August 2019	2 April 2021	110B	0.05
When Dylan mocks Dolly for her hyperbolic stories, and irritates Dawkins by treating him like a sidekick, the two team up to get back at him by making him believe that aliens exist after Roxy mentions that her owners are setting up for an alien parade. Dawkins and Dolly make numerous clues towards Dylan by having him believe that aliens have taken over Camden Town. They soon realize that they went too far when Dylan sabotages the parade; sending himself, Dolly and Dawkins speeding through the park on a UFO float. They manage to land the space ship in the river and the trio apologize with Dylan going easy on Dolly's stories.
20	"A Date with Destiny... Dallas and Déjà Vu"	Jez Hall	Giles Pilbrow	Kim Nguyen	24 August 2019	5 April 2021	111A	0.10
A while after the events of "The Nose Job Part 2", Triple-D's new commercial goes viral. However, Dylan is horrified with how violent and dangerous it was and insists that they be protected. Nevertheless, Triple-D go to their next commercial shoot where they hang out with a contest winner named Hunter. Dylan follows, trying to protect his sisters, but constantly gets kicked out by the producer. Hunter suggests shooting a new commercial from skydiving off a helicopter. Dallas' chute does not open, but Dylan rescues her and is hailed a hero at home. Hunter gets a piece of Dallas' hair and confirms a DNA match as the "same" dalmatians.
21	"The Wow of Miaow"	Jez Hall	Giles Pilbrow	Max Loubaresse	25 August 2019	5 April 2021	111B	0.10
When Dylan fails to defend his next door neighbor cats from Dmitri 1, 2 and 3's insults, Deepak, the peaceful pup, decides to leave and move in next door with them. Soon, the house begins to fall into disarray with Dolly pointing out that Deepak is the only one who keeps things cool and calm. Dylan, adorned with a helmet to protect from his cat allergies, heads over next door to get Deepak back, but Constantin insists that he partake in a series of challenges to get his little brother back. Dylan manages to surpass them all and admits that he cares about Deepak's feelings, bringing peace to the house.
22	"Fear Window"	Jez Hall	Kirsty Peart & Jess Kedward	Max Loubaresse	31 August 2019	12 April 2021	112A	0.04
In a spoof of Rear Window, Dolly has a broken leg and must wear a cone to prevent her from itching and is holed up in her room. To help her pass the time, Dylan gives her his telescope to look around. She witnesses Clarissa supposedly disposing of Hugo's things and believes that she has done away with him. Despite Dylan's doubts, she convinces him to help her by sneaking in next door. The siblings soon find evidence that suggests that she really did commit murder until Hugo suddenly shows up. He had gone away to get a hair transplant. Upon seeing him holding Dolly, Clarissa angrily attacks her owner; ruining his new hair. As this happens, Dolly & Dylan take the opportunity to escape and rush back home.
23	"The Dog House"	Jez Hall	Jacqueline Moody	Althea Aseoche	1 September 2019	12 April 2021	112B	0.04
Clarissa has had enough of the Dalmatians’ antics and resolves to get rid of them for good. She sets up Dylan to make it look like he attacked her owner, Hugo. Hugo is sent to the hospital and is about to be given a sedative by Doctor Dave, but a mishap causes Dave himself to be knocked out by the sedative. Delilah takes an unconscious Doctor Dave and speeds across Camden Town using the World Wide Woof to warn her children of pest control, whom Hugo had called while in the hospital. Pearl aids Delilah in getting home, and when they do, Pearl distracts Pest Control while Delilah wakes Doctor Dave up and gets him to pretend to be the Dalmatians’ owner while the rest of the puppies hide in places in their house. Pest control arrives, but they do not find any wrongdoing. As pest control leaves, the Dalmatians come out of their hiding spots and thank Doctor Dave with a big hug. When Clarissa angrily complains, pest control takes her instead, thinking that she is rabid.
24	"A Summer to Remember" (Parts 1 and 2)	Frédéric Martin	Giles Pilbrow	Max Loubaresse	7 September 2019	3 May 2021	115	0.06
24	"A Summer to Remember" (Parts 1 and 2)	Frédéric Martin	Giles Pilbrow	Althea Aseoche	7 September 2019	3 May 2021	115	0.06
Part 1: The dalmatians rent out a double decker bus and head out to Cornwall, while singing a musical number called "Dogs Are Out for Summer Sun". Upon arriving, Dylan falls in love with a Border Collie named Summer and Dolly falls in love with a Doberman named Spike. They also meet a cow named Bessie who, after being insulted by Dylan, proceeds to do everything she can to ruin their day such as sending them all to certain doom with Dante being the only person aware of her misdeeds. They also encounter a "dumb" seagull named Chips who Dylan thinks was trying to eat Dorothy. Dylan obliviously continues to say negative things about "locals", upsetting Summer, but after getting help in rescuing Dizzy and Dee Dee from a cave, changes his tune and gets on Summer's good side. While Dylan, Summer, Dolly and Spike spend the night looking at the moon, the bus rolls down the hill and begins hanging off of a cliff. Part 2: Doug and Delilah proceed to use a life raft and jump off the bus so that it can roll back. They end up on a small island off shore and decide to take the opportunity to spend time alone, until a rain storm rolls in. Dolly and Spike find a boat and swim out to them, but a hole causes it to sink trapping them on the island with the parents. Dylan, Summer and Dawkins get up to the lighthouse and use Chips to bring the rope to the small island and then have Dylan ride his tent down to rescue them. They tie themselves and use the gale winds to fly back up, but the rope snaps and they fly high into the clouds past thunder and lightning. Nevertheless, they make it back safely. After spending the night, the dalmatians go home with Dylan and Dolly promising to see Summer and Spike again. As they leave, Dylan realizes that Bessie was trying to kill them this whole time.
25	"Long Tongue Day"	Jez Hall	Ciaran Morrison & Mick O'Hara	Bianca Ansems	8 September 2019	19 April 2021	113A	0.08
On the hottest day of the year, the dalmatians head to the pond in the park, only to find it full of all of Camden's dogs. In order to hog it to themselves, Dylan and Dolly invent the legend of the Kraken that lives in it which scares everyone. Unfortunately, their siblings believe the story too and they refuse to believe Dylan and Dolly's truth. They resolve to "slay" the Kraken using a stuffed doll, with everyone realizing the whole thing was a hoax. The pond's owner, Sir Swan, comes back and kicks Dylan and Dolly out. Everyone instead uses the dalmatians' inflatable pool, much to their irritation.
26	"Doggy Da Vinci"	Jez Hall	Nicole Paglia	Althea Aseoche	14 September 2019	19 April 2021	113B	0.08
Following the events of "A Date with Destiny... Dallas and Déjà Vu", after Snowball's owner's shirts get messed with paint, Da Vinci uses the opportunity to paint murals on them. They end up selling really well and the dalmatians use Da Vinci to help pay for a brick wall, but soon she becomes tired of painting the same thing. Da Vinci runs away and gets discovered by the people of Camden including Hunter and his cat Cuddles. Not wanting to be the centre of attention, Da Vinci has a panic attack and flees in terror. Dylan and Dolly, realizing their error, go and rescue her and apologize for their behavior. They use the fixed brick wall to allow Da Vinci to paint. Meanwhile, Hunter has used the events to discover where the dalmatians live.
27	"London, We Have a Problem" (Parts 1 and 2)	Jez Hall	Maria O'Loughlin	Krystal Georgiou; Toby Parry (part 2 only)	15 September 2019	26 April 2021	114	0.04
Part 1: Shortly after the events of "Doggy Da Vinci", Dylan awaits the arrival of his Dog-Star 3000 Space Helmet so that he can do space training with his parents. Unfortunately, they are both called in for work despite it being the weekend; leaving Dylan to babysit his siblings with Dolly. He then meets Hunter, a human who "understands" him and shows an appreciation for his space fascination and promises to meet him later. Before he leaves, Hunter kidnaps Dorothy. Dylan is pushed to his limits on babysitting, especially when Dolly shows no restraint on how to take care of their younger siblings. After a full day of babysitting, Dylan and Dolly realize that Dorothy is missing and use the World Wide Woof to find her. With his plan set in motion, Hunter has Dorothy respond; knowing full well that Dylan will come directly to him and so that he can capture the puppies. Part 2: With the World Wide Wolf continued in part 2, Dylan realizes where it is coming from, but does not tell Dolly and leaves. Dolly follows him to a tall building and Dylan is reunited with Dorothy, but suckered in by Hunter's space themed collection. Dolly sees through the window Hunter's plans to send all the dalmatians to Switzerland and she chases after them when they leave the building. Hunter proceeds to vacuum up all the puppies to send them away; leaving Dylan and Dolly the only ones left. They manage to outwit Hunter by getting their siblings to knock over the glass jar they were trapped in and trap Hunter in a container that gets carried away. Doug and Delilah return home and catch a faint whiff that Hunter left behind. They compare it with one at home and realize that Hunter is in fact a De Vil, meaning that Cruella De Vil is back. Hunter weakly calls his great-aunt for help as the ship with the container he is in travels to Switzerland.
28	"It's My Party"	Jez Hall	Suzanne Lang	Krystal Georgiou	21 September 2019	10 May 2021	116A	0.06
Dylan and Dolly realize that Triple-D's birthday is coming up. They try to avoid it, but Diesel lets it slip. Triple-D is instead upset that nobody sees them as individuals so Dylan plans a party for Dallas, Dolly plans one for Destiny and Diesel plans one for Déjà Vu. Dolly and Dylan end up competing for who has the better party. Destiny and Dallas are upset that their older siblings do not get them, and Dylan and Dolly seem to be making it more about "out-divaing" one another. Déjà Vu, however, seems to get along well with Diesel's impromptu planning. In the end, Dylan and Dolly realize that neither made a great effort, but are happy to see that Diesel managed to make a party that sufficiently satisfies Triple-D. All of the family, including Doug and Delilah when they get home from work, engage in the party full of music, dancing and howling.
29	"Fox in the Dog House"	Frédéric Martin	Rebecca Hobbs	Bianca Ansems	22 September 2019	10 May 2021	116B	0.06
When Dolly accidentally hits Fergus with her skateboard, the dalmatians take him in to make him feel better. Dylan and Dolly are surprised that Fergus has a great grasp on the younger siblings, but he seems to be teaching them to be wild. Dolly finds out that Fergus has begun faking his injury and she and Dylan discover that he has been teaching them to rob places. They eventually out him to the younger puppies, but this does not phase them. Instead Dylan and Dolly point out that Fergus has become too tamed from living with them, which scares him back into the wild.
30	"Fetch"	Jez Hall	Suzanne Lang	Robert Nelson	28 September 2019	7 June 2021	117A	0.14
Dylan orders an A.I. orb named Fetch and becomes attached to using it for chores around the house. When Dolly and the rest of the pups begin abusing its abilities and breaks it, Dylan has Dawkins reprogram it for him. Dawkins soon becomes attached and through Dolly's influence orders many more for all the dalmatians. However, they soon begin causing trouble around the house and Dylan and Dolly resolve to collect them all before Doug and Delilah get home. Upon seeing the mountain they collected, they have the Fetches sing their anniversary song known as "We're Sending You Love", but the Dimitri Trio's giant whoopee cushion ruins it, and Doug and Delilah blame both Dylan and Dolly.
31	"Don't Push Your Luck"	Frédéric Martin	Ciaran Morrison & Mick O'Hara	Max Loubaresse	29 September 2019	7 June 2021	117B	0.14
Dolly enters the skateboarding competition to compete against her crush Hansel. Fearing that she will have bad luck, she is convinced that Big Fee will help her win and she assigns herself her manager. Soon, Dolly begins to do incredibly well in the competition with Big Fee's good luck supposedly making her win. Dylan and Dawkins refuse to believe she is lucky and try to disprove her. Eventually, Big Fee begins cashing in on Dolly's fame and begins to push her family away. Realizing what she is losing, Dolly finally gets rid of Big Fee at the cost of losing to Hansel.
32	"The Curse of the Ferrydog"	Miklos Weigert	Giles Pilbrow	Dan Hamman	3 February 2020	14 June 2021	118	N/A
32	"The Walls Are Alive"	Frédéric Martin	Nicole Paglia	Althea Aseoche	3 February 2020	14 June 2021	118	N/A
Diesel finds a shard from a Greek vase, intriguing Dylan enough to start an expedition. When they dig up a trio of buried skulls that could belong to Cerberus, Dante and Portia demand that they rebury them, but he refuses. Together, Dante and Portia proceed to frighten Dylan, Dolly and Dawkins via an elaborate practical joke with the intent to get Dylan to repent his actions. Dylan eventually loses his sanity to the point where Dante begins to feel guilty. After failing to tell him the truth, Dante breaks out into a song to snap Dylan back to his senses, angering Portia, who considered the practical joke a dramatic performance. The dalmatians are having a party when Dolly accidentally knocks the lights out while trying to start a new game. Suddenly, the walls begin to move on their own and the dalmatians are picked off one by one; assumed to be eaten by the walls, leaving Dolly the only one left. She discovers that they were all sucked up by a ventilation shaft and stuck to a wall in a large room where a fan blows them against the wall. After shutting off the fan, it is revealed that they are in Constantin's house after he had remolded one of his rooms. After going back home, the dalmatians' lights go out again from Constantin.
33	"Diamond Dogs"	Jez Hall	Rebecca Hobbs	Bianca Ansems	4 February 2020	21 June 2021	119	0.05
33	"Ride Along"	Frédéric Martin	Rebecca Hobbs	Krystal Georgiou	4 February 2020	21 June 2021	119	0.05
Dylan and Dolly prank Clarissa after she insults Dorothy. Later, Dorothy is seen chewing on Clarissa's prized diamond necklace and Dylan and Dolly believe that she somehow stole it. They decide to pull a "reverse heist" to put the necklace back into her home. Dylan, Dolly, Diesel and the Dmitri Trio break in with the help of the Canal Crew, but upon returning it, realize that Clarissa already has the necklace. Dolly accidentally triggers the alarm and the six siblings hide. Clarissa realizes that the necklace was not special when she sees other dogs wearing it, making her angry at Hugo. It turns out that Stanislav was selling them and decided to give one to Dorothy out of sympathy. After the Dalmatians escape, they decide that even though everything they just did was for nothing, it was worth it just to see Clarissa get mad. After witnessing Pearl in action, Dolly decides to tag along on one of her patrols. Dolly tries to be serious and treat everything with suspicion, annoying Dylan and everyone else. Dolly and Pearl learn that various objects have been disappearing all over Camden. They believe that Constantin could be a suspect as he was near all the crimes, but he turns out to be "too boring". They realize that Chips the Seagull has been eating all the stolen objects. After a frantic chase, they catch him and have him give up the goods. To impress Apollo, Dolly has Pearl arrest her, which she believes may be real.
34	"Poodlewolf!"	Miklos Weigert	Giles Pilbrow	Max Loubaresse	5 February 2020	28 June 2021	120	0.06
34	"The Longest Night"	Frédéric Martin	Giles Pilbrow	Dan Hamman	5 February 2020	28 June 2021	120	0.06
Dylan excitedly begins playing Poodlewolf, which Dolly finds "tragic", and makes fun of him. When Hansel comes over to hang out with Dylan, Dolly sets Dylan's playtime longer than usual so that she can hang out with him in his stead. Unfortunately, Dylan plays too long and believes he is Poodlewolf and that Dolly is the Feline Princess. With Dawkins' help, they convince Constantin to pretend to be the evil Furball and have Dylan finish the game. Dolly overcomes the embarrassment and helps Dylan "defeat" Furball which impresses Hansel, but Dolly must clean Constantin's pool as payment. Hansel invites Dylan and Fergus, and later Dawkins and Diesel, to The Longest Night which is to test their alpha male instincts. When Dolly, Roxy and Snowball are denied entry—due to the fact that the Longest Night is for guys only—they decide to get back at them. After hearing the story of the Ice Troll, the girls begin scaring the boys with noises and eventually get Diesel to help in their prank. Hansel grows scared, but Dylan overcomes his fear and "defeats" the Ice Troll which ends up impressing the girls. Hansel admits that he does not care for being an alpha male and all 7 dogs plus Fergus, along with Big Fee who scared everyone, enjoy the night together, howling at the moon.
35	"Balancing Act"	Jez Hall	Kirsty Peart & Jess Kedward	Althea Aseoche	6 February 2020	12 July 2021	121	0.09
35	"Dawkins Strikes Back"	Frédéric Martin	Rebecca Hobbs	Bianca Ansems	6 February 2020	12 July 2021	121	0.09
After having Dylan take the wrap for a damaged family photo, Dolly becomes entranced with landing on top of a crate that was then picked up by a crane. When the worker leaves for lunch, Dolly finds herself hanging high with a rainstorm coming in. Dylan does everything he can to try to keep her balanced as the crane keeps shifting. Eventually, Dylan decides to hop on top so that they can stay balanced. Learning humility, Dolly admits that she was the one who damaged the photo, as well as admitting to several other past incidents. Dylan forgives her just in time for the worker to come back and lower them on the roof of their house. Dawkins is tirelessly angered with how Dylan and Dolly take him for granted and promptly leaves the house to enjoy himself for the first time ever. Dylan and Dolly quickly learn that they are incapable of working the machinations in the house without him. Meanwhile, Dawkins meets up with the Canal Crew who teach him how to relax, but he cannot stop himself from fixing things. When everything in the house starts to go haywire, the siblings break down and beg Dawkins to come back, with the Canal Crew working out a deal with them so that Dawkins can have more personal time. Peace is eventually restored.
36	"Poodlefall!"	Jez Hall	Ishai Ravid	Krystal Georgiou	10 February 2020	19 July 2021	122	0.09
36	"Dotty Dancing"	Frédéric Martin	Kirsty Peart & Jess Kedward	Max Loubaresse	10 February 2020	19 July 2021	122	0.09
Dolly inserts herself into Dylan's Poodlewolf gameplay session so that she can be with Hansel. Due to her disregard for the rules, she accidentally gets Poodlewolf "killed", traumatizing Dylan. The whole family turns on Dolly, and Hansel explains to her how important Poodlewolf is to Dylan. Realizing what she has done to her brother, she vows to make it right; she decides to try and revive Poodlewolf with the Resurrection Bone. Dolly, Dawkins and Hansel go on a quest to retrieve it, but learn that the game piece ordered is at Constantin's house. Dolly breaks in and outwits Constantin and gets the game piece back in time to resurrect Poodlewolf, pleasing Dylan. Portia invites D.J. to a "not a party party". Upon seeing Dylan dancing, she decides to hold a contest with the loser having to eat Constantin's hairballs. Dylan recruits D.J. to help him learn to dance. They do not tell Dolly as she once made fun of Dylan for a whole year about his dancing. She soon becomes convinced that Dylan is reforming Howl-A-Rama, a singing group, without her. At the party, Portia is about to feed Dylan the hairballs for his dancing, when D.J. finally tells Dolly what is happening. She dances bad on purpose and brings the other dalmatians in, humiliating Portia and saving Dylan.
37	"Yappily Ever After"	Jez Hall	Ishai Ravid	Althea Aseoche	11 February 2020	8 November 2021	123	0.09
37	"D-Factor"	Frédéric Martin	Ciaran Morrison & Mick O'Hara	Bianca Ansems & Toby Parry	11 February 2020	8 November 2021	123	0.09
In this take of the "Cinderella" story, Dolly accidentally injures Hugo using a tennis-ball machine. This results in Doug and Delilah making her be Clarissa's "maid" to pay her back in Hugo's place. In addition, Clarissa bans her from going to the "fetch-ball finals", so Dylan and the canal crew take her place and disguise Dolly so she isn't seen by Clarissa. Dolly ends up hiding under a bench and is approached by the hidden Prince Corgi, and they bond over their love of skateboarding. As Clarissa and her friends leave, Dolly runs back home, leaving her skateboard behind. Prince Corgi goes around Camden to find the owner and eventually tracks down Dolly, and the two go skateboarding together, whilst Clarissa is arrested for "pet cruelty" at Dylan's insistence when she accidentally hits Hugo, injuring him more when she tries riding on Dolly's skateboard and lost control of it. After that, Doug and Delilah let Dolly off the hook as soon as Hugo recovers. Clarissa tells Dylan that he has no personality and begins to question himself. He finally decides to be the "funny guy", but his jokes are stale. Nevertheless, Clarissa invites Dylan to her summer soirée party to perform. Everyone begins to ironically laugh at him when Dolly notices that Clarissa plans to prank him by dumping pink paint on him. She fails to stop it and Dylan is humiliated. However, Dylan finally begins talking back to everyone and exploiting their flaws and begins humiliating Clarissa who slips and gets dirty, resulting in Hugo having to give her a bath. Dylan accepts himself for who he is.
38	"Puppy Dreams" (Parts 1 and 2)	Joonas Utti	Maria O'Loughlin	Juan Pedro Alcaide & JP Saari	20 February 2020	22 November 2021	126	0.08
Part 1: At night, all of Doug & Delilah's pups are asleep. Dreams that the pups had include: Diesel's Dream: Dylan tries cleaning up Diesel so he wouldn't make the place a mess.; Dolly's Dream #1: Dolly and Snowball try to get Roxy to dance.; Fergus's Dream: Fergus tries to eat a dinosaur bone, which Dylan doesn't allow.; Triple D's Dream: Triple D are having a competition in order to decide which one of them is cute.; Dylan's Dream #1: Dylan plays a prank on Hugo, which then turns into a disaster.; After his dream, Dylan is having a nightmare all thanks to Hugo ringing his phone. Part 2: More dreams include: Dawkins's Dream: Dawkins tries to shoot kibble into a bowl, with Dylan being his assistant.; Dylan's Dream #2: Dylan was going to Mars in his spaceship, but Dorothy interrupts his trip.; Deepak's Dream: After his balloon got popped, Deepak gets Dolly skateboard for a replacement. However, Dolly is not happy.; Dolly's Dream #2: Dolly is being annoyed by Clarissa because of her singing, resulting in Dolly and Clarissa both fighting with each other.; After Dolly wakes up from her nightmare, it's almost morning. As Dorothy nearly falls down to Dylan, Dylan luckily catches her, and with that Dolly is now fine after waking up from her nightmare and goes back to sleep.
39	"Dante's Inferno"	Jez Hall	Giles Pilbrow	Krystal Georgiou	22 February 2020	15 November 2021	124	0.10
39	"Better the De Vil You Know"	Jez Hall	Giles Pilbrow	Max Loubaresse	22 February 2020	15 November 2021	124	0.10
Six months after the events of "London, We Have a Problem", Dante becomes depressed after his predictions are proven false, so Dolly and Dylan act along with his predictions to make him feel better. Meanwhile, Hunter is freed and decides to get revenge on the dalmatians. Hunter attacks the family and captures Dante, who welcomes "doomsday." However, he freaks when it is revealed that Hunter can understand the dogs. Dolly and Dylan rescue him and attack Hunter and Cuddles. During the battle, Dylan realizes that Hunter has a dog-like personality when it's activated. They defeat Hunter and Dylan apologizes for doubting Dante, who warns them that Hunter will return. Continuing from "Dante's Inferno", the family begins to prep for Hunter's return. Dylan, feeling that their previous encounter was all his fault, takes the lead in protecting his siblings as Hunter tries and fails to capture them in increasingly ridiculous situations. Doug and Delilah prepare a bus to transport them to the country while they go to work. However, Hunter takes over the bus and tries to capture the puppies. Dylan once again exploits his dog mannerisms and gets rid of him and rescues his siblings. Hunter finds himself in an alley as he is approached by his great aunt Cruella De Vil.
40	"The De Vil Wears Puppies" (Parts 1 and 2)	Frédéric Martin	Maria O'Loughlin	Althea Aseoche	22 February 2020	22 November 2021	125	0.07
40	"The De Vil Wears Puppies" (Parts 1 and 2)	Frédéric Martin	Maria O'Loughlin	Bianca Ansems	22 February 2020	22 November 2021	125	0.07
Part 1: Following the events of "Better the De Vil You Know", the dalmatians relax knowing that Hunter is no longer a threat. However, they are shocked to find that Cruella De Vil has moved in next door. Doug and Delilah tell Dylan and Dolly about their family history with Cruella and how she plans to kill them and turn them into fur coats. Cruella and Hunter proceed to perform many tactics to weaken the dalmatians' defenses and starve them out. At Dylan's indirect suggestion, Diesel ends up digging a tunnel all the way to the park. However, the De Vils catch onto their scheme by accident and attack them from both fronts using Dizzy and Dee Dee's childlike innocence. The dalmatians escape to the park, only to be captured by Cruella's hired goons and entrapped in a shipping container to be flown away by helicopter. Doug and Delilah try to fend off Cruella who instead captures the two of them. Part 2: Clarissa, witnessing the events, hops on behind Cruella's car. At the park, the Canal Crew hop onto the shipping container as it is being carried away. Dylan and Dolly manage to evade being captured and hop onto Pearl and proceed to chase the De Vils through the streets of London. At the docks, Hunter realizes that Cruella plans to kill the puppies for their fur and is locked up with the rest of the family in the container. In the ship Cruella reveals Delilah and Doug her plan. Meanwhile, in the container Hunter explains to the rest of the family how he suffered for six months in the container and Cruella never called him once. Upon arriving at the docks with Pearl, the ship takes off with Clarissa telling Dylan and Dolly that their family is on it, and Pearl tosses them onto it and together with the Canal Crew fight off Cruella and her goons to free their family before they are skinned in an elaborate machine. During this, Hunter, upon having freed himself and the puppies from cages, protects Dorothy, and finally stands up for himself before making Cruella fall into the machine. The dalmatians save her just in time for the police to arrive after being notified by a citizen. As Cruella is taken away, Hunter is forgiven, and the series concludes with the Dalmatians and their friends taking a bus back home.

== Shorts ==
Shorts	Episodes	Originally released	
Shorts	Episodes	First released	Last released
Gigglebug Guarantee	6	14 December 2018	2 September 2019
Animals vs. Humans	4	14 April 2019	2 May 2019

=== Gigglebug Guarantee (2018–19) ===
As a part of the series, there were a total of ten shorts made. They were released worldwide, but only 6 were released in the UK, though the last four shorts have been seen in the two-part clipshow "Puppy Dreams".

In the United States, the shorts were broadcast in production order and aired in the middle of two half-hour episodes per broadcast.

All of the shorts were directed by Joonas Utti, written by Maria O’Loughlin and executive produced by Anttu Harlin.

No.	Title	Original release date	American air date	Prod. code
1	"Merry Pups"	14 December 2018	2 April 2021	105
Dorothy is excited to open one of her presents. However, Dylan doesn't let her as it's not time to open gifts yet. Dolly is currently eyeing the presents. Dylan puts on a "hat" (which appears to be a colander) and holds Dorothy's gift. Dorothy gets tired and goes off to bed. Dylan turns on the flashlight on his hat and holds a broom in an attempt to protect the presents. Dolly, Dizzy and Dee Dee try to sneak by and get their presents early, however. As Dolly eyes the presents she signals for Dizzy and Dee Dee to go. Dylan has stacked all of the presents on top of each other in order to get a better look at everything. He notices Dizzy and Dee Dee and sets up a system that will ring bells when Dizzy and Dee Dee touch a string. Dolly begins to run and manages to avoid them all, much to Dylan's shock. She ends up startled and it's revealed Dizzy and Dee Dee got tangled up. As Dylan runs off to reprimand them, Dolly uses the opportunity to snatch a gift. However, Dylan quickly notices and the two argue over a present. All their arguing shakes the tower so much that it falls and Dylan and Dolly get tangled up in the strings, too. One present remains on the ladder: Dorothy's. It falls and the four worry the ladder will fall and hit it. Luckily, it ends up not hitting it. Unfortunately, however, a random bolt of lightning comes and strikes it as the four look on, grimacing. Tomorrow however, when Dorothy wakes up the next day, she is happy just playing with the ribbon on top of the ashes that made up her present. Note: It is the only short to be excluded in the episode "Puppy Dreams".
2	"Muddy Pups"	14 February 2019	29 March 2021	101
Dylan is currently cleaning an area, until Diesel (being his dirty usual self) comes to ruin it all, making the place messy. Dylan is worried about this and follows Diesel's trail to clean up all of the dirt before cleaning Diesel himself. Diesel digs a hole, however, to become dirty again. Dylan gets worried again and Diesel (being his dirty usual self again) comes out of a hole. Dylan then tries to get Diesel to make him clean again (in a Whac-A-Mole-like style). Dylan then gets dizzy and falls asleep. In his dream, he sees a room with many holes in it. Diesel is seen popping around the room. Dylan gets scared, confused and sees the room moving with even more holes, clones of Diesel popping around in addition. The room turns into a giant Diesel head that licks Dylan as the room fills with water. When the dream sequence is over, Diesel (as his normal self) licks Dylan to wake him up. When he wakes up, he is very surprised by how clean the area is, until he accidentally spills a bucket of water. However, Dylan then changes his mind about the room being clean when Diesel shakes himself and both make the area messy again.
3	"Prank Pups"	19 February 2019	30 March 2021	102
Hugo was calling someone on the phone, and Dylan spies on him. Hugo would then move on to cut down the bush of Clarissa, and Dylan would prank him by gluing the phone where Hugo cannot carry it. Dylan glues the phone on the floor and prepares to watch the prank happen. Dolly would then come along to watch the prank with him. Dylan then calls on Hugo to watch the prank go into action. Hugo then acts like a dog when he found his phone, and Dylan and Dolly laugh at him. Hugo then tries to carry his phone when it is stuck (a part of the prank) and both the dogs again keep on laughing that Dylan bursts into tears and gets his face filled with water (wearing his helmet of course). Dolly then gets Dylan's helmet off and threw it to Hugo's butt. Dylan then tries to get his helmet out of his butt when Dolly (with her skateboard) knocks Hugo over (getting the helmet now to his head and losing his pants). Dylan is not comfortable seeing Hugo like this when Dolly is still laughing at him. Hugo then runs over to Dolly's skateboard and her skateboard tripped his phone, knocked over him and cut off the bush. Hugo is then free from Dylan's helmet with Hugo's underwear now hanging on a tree branch. Dylan would then bring back his helmet to his spot when it suddenly cracks. Dolly then wants Dylan to fix it with the glue, but unfortunately, it breaks into pieces as Dylan glances at the audience.
4	"Ransom Pups"	20 February 2019	31 March 2021	103
Dolly gets annoyed by Clarissa's singing voice, so she threw a rubber chicken to annoy her. For revenge, Clarissa gives Dolly the leg of the rooster, the rest of the toy belongs to her. Clarissa tries to torture Dolly by destroying the toy on her. Meanwhile, Dolly destroys her bush (the bush previously from "Prank Pups"). With this Dolly got her toy back, only for Clarissa to have the other leg. Being repaired for another fight, both dogs smash into a honey pot, hear Hugo sing and get swarmed by bees.
5	"Target Pups"	21 February 2019	1 April 2021	104
Dawkins wants to shoot kibble into a bowl, but Dylan keeps tricking him, so he gets his revenge on Dylan. After that, Dylan has a turn at shooting some kibble into a bowl, and things start to go wrong. Dawkins then turns off the machine and Dylan gets tied up in the hose. Dawkins then finally gets to put some kibble in a bowl.
6	"Yoga Pups"	2 September 2019	5 April 2021	106
Deepak gets Dolly's skateboard after his balloon popped. Dolly tries to get her skateboard back by making loud noises, giving him a tennis-ball, and giving him a treat. Finally, both dogs go for a wild skateboard ride, but luckily Deepak gets through the course safe and sound while Dolly gets her skateboard back by falling down a skateboard ramp. Despite taking a little bit of damage, she and her skateboard are fine. Note: This short was released on the Disney Junior YouTube channel rather than the Disney Channel one.
TBA	"Disco Pups"	20 February 2020 (TV, "Puppy Dreams Part 1") TBA (Online)	8 April 2021	109
Dolly, Roxy and Snowball were dancing to the music, until Roxy accidentally trips. All of the dogs recorded a video on their moves, Dolly and Roxy find it funny but Snowball hates how the video turned out. Snowball would teach dancing lessons to Dolly and Roxy by showing off different dance moves in various music genres. Most of these lessons unfortunately failed. When the characters all did a statue together, Roxy falls again. As a result, Snowball starts going crazy by barking out the word "nie" (meaning "no" in Polish and Slovak) while jumping in different directions. Dolly and Roxy both thought of the jumping as a dance, so they turn on the radio and start jumping around like Snowball. The dance attempt surprisingly worked. As all three characters watch the video with all of them doing the same dance move, each of them liked how the video turned out, especially Snowball, who thought that Roxy is perfectly dancing without any accidents.
TBA	"Jurassic Pups"	20 February 2020 (TV, "Puppy Dreams Part 1") TBA (Online)	6 April 2021	107
Dylan is currently constructing a Tyrannosaurus skeleton structure, but Fergus wants to eat the bones Dylan needs for his structure. Fergus would give Dylan a little bone piece, but Fergus secretly kept a bigger bone that he will eat. Dylan gets worried that he is missing one bone, which was eaten by Fergus. Dylan gets frustrated by this, but when Fergus burped, the structure collapsed. As Dylan gets upset, he would give Fergus a punishment. Dylan would rebuild his structure, and Fergus would hold on to the right part of the leg, since he has eaten the bottom part. After this, Dylan starts drawing a sketch of the structure.
TBA	"Diva Pups"	20 February 2020 (TV, "Puppy Dreams Part 1") TBA (Online)	9 April 2021	110
Triple-D are trying to get likes on the internet by making a livestream of cute faces on a phone. However, Dallas and Destiny started to argue over a bubble container, which resulted in the trio losing all the likes they had. The container was given to Déjà Vu, who doesn't know what it is for. Dallas and Destiny continued their conflict, which would evolve into a Dragon Ball-styled fight. Déjà Vu would open the container and experienced a bubble coming out of the liquid, which gave her an idea to burp bubbles, the idea successfully give the trio more likes, with this Dallas and Destiny stopped their conflict. More likes keep dropping as Déjà Vu continues to burp more bubbles.
TBA	"Space Pups"	20 February 2020 (TV, "Puppy Dreams Part 2") TBA (Online)	7 April 2021	108
Dylan is going to Mars in his spaceship, but Dorothy is ruining his trip to the planet. This results in him losing his spaceship and getting sucked into a black hole, but it turns out that he and Dorothy are just playing at the park.

=== Animals vs. Humans (2019) ===
Animals vs Humans is a series of short internet videos that are published on YouTube by Disney Channel. Each episode has the same plot; Dolly stops riding her skateboard, and will hang out with Dylan to watch a competition game known as Animals vs. Humans. Each game would revolve around a different subject and both dogs would watch funny live-action videos about humans and animals. The animals would always win, Dylan and Dolly continued to chat about the subject, until Dolly gives out a "trigger word", as the pups would hug Dylan and Dolly. A total of 15 shorts were released worldwide, but only 4 were released in the UK.

No.	Title	Original release date
1	"Music"	14 April 2019
2	"Dancing"	21 April 2019
3	"Playtime"	28 April 2019
4	"Food"	2 May 2019
TBA	"Birthdays"	TBA (Note: These shorts have been released on the YouTube channels of international Disney Channels.)
TBA	"Cleaning"	TBA
TBA	"Driving"	TBA
TBA	"Extreme Sports"	TBA
TBA	"Nature"	TBA
TBA	"Relaxing"	TBA
TBA	"Skills"	TBA
TBA	"Sports"	TBA
TBA	"Water"	TBA
TBA	"Winter"	TBA
TBA	"Holidays"	TBA

== Release ==
The series was originally going to be released sometime in 2018, but was postponed for unknown reasons. However, it did have a sneak peek on Disney Channel in the UK and Ireland on 14 December that year with the episode "Dog's Best Friend" and the short "Merry Pups". Disney Channel in Germany also premiered a sneak peek of the series on 15 December with the two segments of the first episode, and other Disney Channels across Europe followed suit.

The rest of the series launched in the United Kingdom and Ireland on 18 March 2019, with other countries following after. The show concluded airing in the UK and Ireland on 22 February 2020, and it was cancelled after one series. Reruns continued airing until 31 March 2020.

Though the series was originally going to be released on Disney Channels worldwide, on 11 June 2019, the Annecy Film Festival reported that the series would have a North American streaming release on Disney+. The entire series was released in the US and Canada on 28 February 2020, following the UK airdate of the series finale. The show later had its US cable television premiere on Disney XD on 29 March 2021, and the final episodes aired on the channel on 22 November 2021.

== Songs ==
Title	Performer(s)	Episode	Soundtrack
"I Got My Pups with Me"	Kathryn D. Rende	All episodes (opening credits)	101 Dalmatian Street (Version 1)
"It's a Dog's Life"	Celica Gray	All episodes (ending credits)	101 Dalmatian Street (Version 1)
"In the House"	Scott Krippayne and Felicia Barton	—N/a	101 Dalmatian Street (Version 1)
"Dolly's Rap"	Michaela Dietz	"Poetry Scam"	101 Dalmatian Street (Version 2)
"Dogs Are Out for Summer Sun"	Michaela Dietz, Josh Brener, Bert Davis, Nefeli Karakosta, Florrie Wilkinson, Rhashan Stone and Ella Kenion	"A Summer to Remember"	101 Dalmatian Street (Version 2)
"We're Sending You Love"	Harriet Carmichael	"Fetch"	101 Dalmatian Street (Version 2)
"It's a Prank"	Kyle Soller, Lauren Donzis, and Abigail Zoe Lewis	"The Curse of the Ferrydog"	101 Dalmatian Street (Version 2)
