= Don Moody =

American executive producer and CEO (born 1962)

- Born: March 16, 1962 (age 64); Manhattan, New York, U.S.
- Education: School of Visual Arts
- Occupations: Executive producer, CEO
- Notable work: WordWorld
- Relatives: Jacqueline Moody (cousin)
- Awards: Daytime Emmy Award for Outstanding Children's Animated Program; Daytime Emmy for Outstanding Achievement in Main Title Design

Don Moody (born March 16, 1962) is the executive producer and creator of several children's educational television shows, including Mia & Codie, an animated preschool series focused on early computational thinking skills, and WordWorld, a three-time Emmy Award-winning animated series that airs in over 90 countries and 12 languages. He is also the inventor of Codie Blocks, an early-learning system that integrates physical coding blocks, a digital app, and an educator portal to teach foundational computational thinking skills and introduce early AI literacy.

== WordWorld ==
When Moody discovered his wife was pregnant, he created WordWorld, a multimedia property designed to capture children’s imaginations at a young age and foster a love of words and reading.

Under Moody's direction, WordWorld has evolved into a three-time Emmy Award-winning children's television show, licensed consumer products, and interactive mobile apps. The television series is broadcast in 12 languages and supports English Language Learning (ELL) around the world. A rigorous third-party study funded by the US Department of Education demonstrates that WordWorld is an effective early literacy tool for preschoolers. WordWorld was the recipient of $20 million in grant funding by the US Department of Education.

== Mia & Codie ==
Moody also created Mia & Codie, a preschool animated comedy series that introduces children to coding concepts through storytelling and character-driven adventures. In 2022, production began on the CG animated series in collaboration with Canadian production company Epic Story Media. The 40×4.5-minute series has been commissioned by TVO, Knowledge Network, and TFO, with animation led by Relish Studios in Vancouver. The series is part of a larger educational property that includes Codie Blocks, a hands-on coding system developed by Moody to reinforce the computational thinking concepts introduced in the show.

In 2025, Mia & Codie began airing on PBS member stations across the United States through distribution by American Public Television (APT). Internationally, the series is being represented by DeAPlaneta Entertainment for global distribution, following a partnership agreement with Epic Story Media. Mia & Codie was also recognized in 2024 as a finalist for the Cartoons on the Bay Pulcinella Awards in the Upper Preschool (4–6 years) category, which celebrates outstanding achievements in children’s animation. A second season is scheduled for release in mid-2026.

== Codie Blocks ==
In 2017, Moody began developing Codie Blocks, an early childhood learning system designed to introduce young children to foundational concepts such as computational thinking, prompting, sequencing, logic, and early AI literacy through hands-on play. The invention emerged from his exploration of how very young children understand abstract complex ideas, particularly in the context of computational thinking. Moody has often described this period as an “aha moment,” after observing children successfully grasp coding concepts through physical interaction.

These early successes later informed the development of the animated preschool series Mia & Codie, which was created as a narrative extension of the concepts first explored through the invention. During this process, Moody also identified a key barrier to early coding education: many early childhood educators lacked the technical confidence to teach the subject. In response, he expanded Codie Blocks into a broader 360-degree educational ecosystem by pairing the physical coding blocks and Mia & Codie show with a turnkey educator portal.
