= Benjamin Kerfoot =

English actor

Ben Kerfoot
- Born: Ben Jonathon Kerfoot; 5 August 1992 (age 34); Godalming, Surrey, England
- Occupation: Actor
- Years active: 2004–present

Ben Kerfoot (born 5 August 1992, Godalming, Surrey) is an English actor best known for playing Oscar Cole in the CBBC Series M.I. High, and as Malachite in the Channel 5 TV drama series The Secret of Eel Island. He has appeared in a variety of short films and theatre.

== Filmography ==
=== Television ===
| Year | Title | Role | Notes | Ref |
|---|---|---|---|---|
| 2004 | POV: Emotional Literacy Dramas | Josh | Guest appearance | |
| 2006 | The Secret of Eel Island | Malachite | Series 2 regular | |
| 2006 | Living It | Taylor | Guest appearance | |
| 2009 | Casualty | Joe | Guest appearance | |
| 2008–2011 | M.I. High | Oscar Cole | Series 3-5 regular | |
| 2015 | Dixi | Ash | Series 2 regular | |

=== Film ===
| Year | Title | Role | Notes | Ref |
|---|---|---|---|---|
| 2013 | Mercury (short film) | Mercury | Directed by Marcus Belassie. | |
| 2013 | House Of Neptune | William | Directed by Keya O'Keeffe. | |
| 2014 | The Substitute | Patrick | Directed by Nathan Hughes-Berry. | |
| 2014 | The Falling | Donny (Boy 1) | Directed by Carol Morley. | |
| 2015 | Les exilés | James Boswell | Directed by Rinatu Frassati. | |
| 2017 | Nocturne | Callum | Directed by Nathan Satin Silver. | |
| 2018 | Grey Scale | Night | Directed by Tanya Kneale. | |
| 2018 | Woman In Stall | N/A | Directed by Madeleine Sims-Fewer. | |
| 2019 | Beasts | Jack | Directed by Sye Allen. | |
