= Sensation (2021 film) =

2021 British film

- Theatrical release poster
- Directed by: Martin Grof
- Written by: Martin Grof; Magdalena Drahovska
- Produced by: Martin Grof; Efosa Osaghae
- Starring: Eugene Simon; Emily Wyatt; Jennifer Martin
- Music by: Neil Myers
- Production company: GROFILM s.r.o
- Distributed by: Vertical Entertainment
- Release date: December 31, 2021
- Countries: United Kingdom; Slovakia
- Language: English

Sensation is a British mystery thriller film, directed by Martin Grof, and starring Eugene Simon, Emily Wyatt and Jennifer Martin.

The film was shot on location in London and Suffolk in 2019. It had a limited theatrical release in 2021 in the US, where it was distributed by Vertical Entertainment.

== Cast ==
- Eugene Simon as Andrew Cooper
- Emily Wyatt as Nadia
- Jennifer Martin as May
- Bethan Wright as Rebecca
- Alastair G. Cumming as Dr. Daniel Marinus
- Anil Desai as Shaan
- Kai Francis Lewis as Yuri
- Alexander Reid as Ernesto

== Release ==
Sensation was released on December 31, 2021, in the US. The film secured a limited theatrical release across the US.

== Reception ==
On the review aggregator website Rotten Tomatoes, 13% of 8 critics' reviews are positive.

The Guardian's Phil Hoad, described the film as "convoluted, untidy sci-fi conspiracy yarn". Film Threat's Rob Rector remarked "Those who seek their sci-fi with a more cerebral slant will find quite a bit to admire here.", praising the cast performances and Grof's direction.
