= Alex Reid (fighter) =

English mixed martial arts fighter (born 1975)

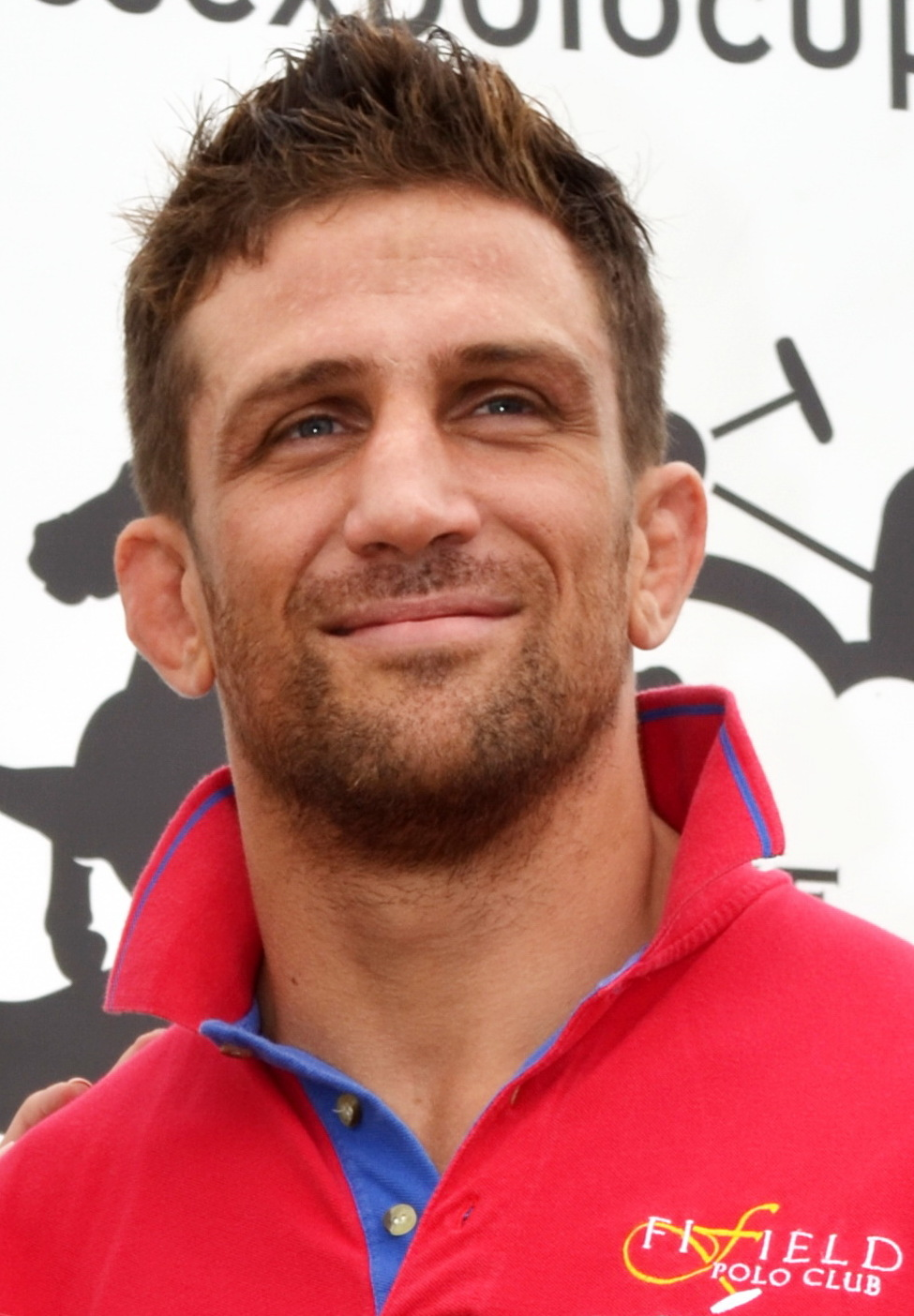
- Reid in 2011
- Born: Alexander Aristides Reid; 21 July 1975 (age 51); Aldershot, Hampshire, England
- Other names: Reidernator; Alex Thorne
- Height: 6 ft 0 in (1.83 m)
- Weight: 13 st 3 lb (185 lb; 84 kg)
- Division: Light Heavyweight; Middleweight
- Reach: 77 in (200 cm)
- Style: Kickboxing
- Fighting out of: London, England
- Team: London Shootfighters; Reidernater Vale Tudo
- Years active: 1998–present

Kickboxing record
- Total: 10
- Wins: 9
- By knockout: 8
- Losses: 1

Mixed martial arts record
- Total: 22
- Wins: 10
- By knockout: 3
- By submission: 5
- By decision: 2
- Losses: 10
- By knockout: 3
- By submission: 1
- By decision: 6
- Draws: 1
- No contests: 1

Other information
- Spouse: Katie Price (m. 2010; div. 2012)
- Children: 4
- Website: www.ReidyMedia.com
- Mixed martial arts record from Sherdog

Alexander Aristides Reid (born 21 July 1975) is an English former mixed martial artist (MMA), fighting under Bellator, BAMMA and Cage Rage. He is also an actor, having been in Hollyoaks and making an appearance in Drifters. Reid was the winner of Channel 4's 7th and final series of Celebrity Big Brother in 2010.

== Early life ==
Reid was born in Aldershot, Hampshire, where he attended the Connaught School. His father was a paratrooper and his mother was a homemaker. He is the youngest of six siblings.

== Career ==
=== Acting ===
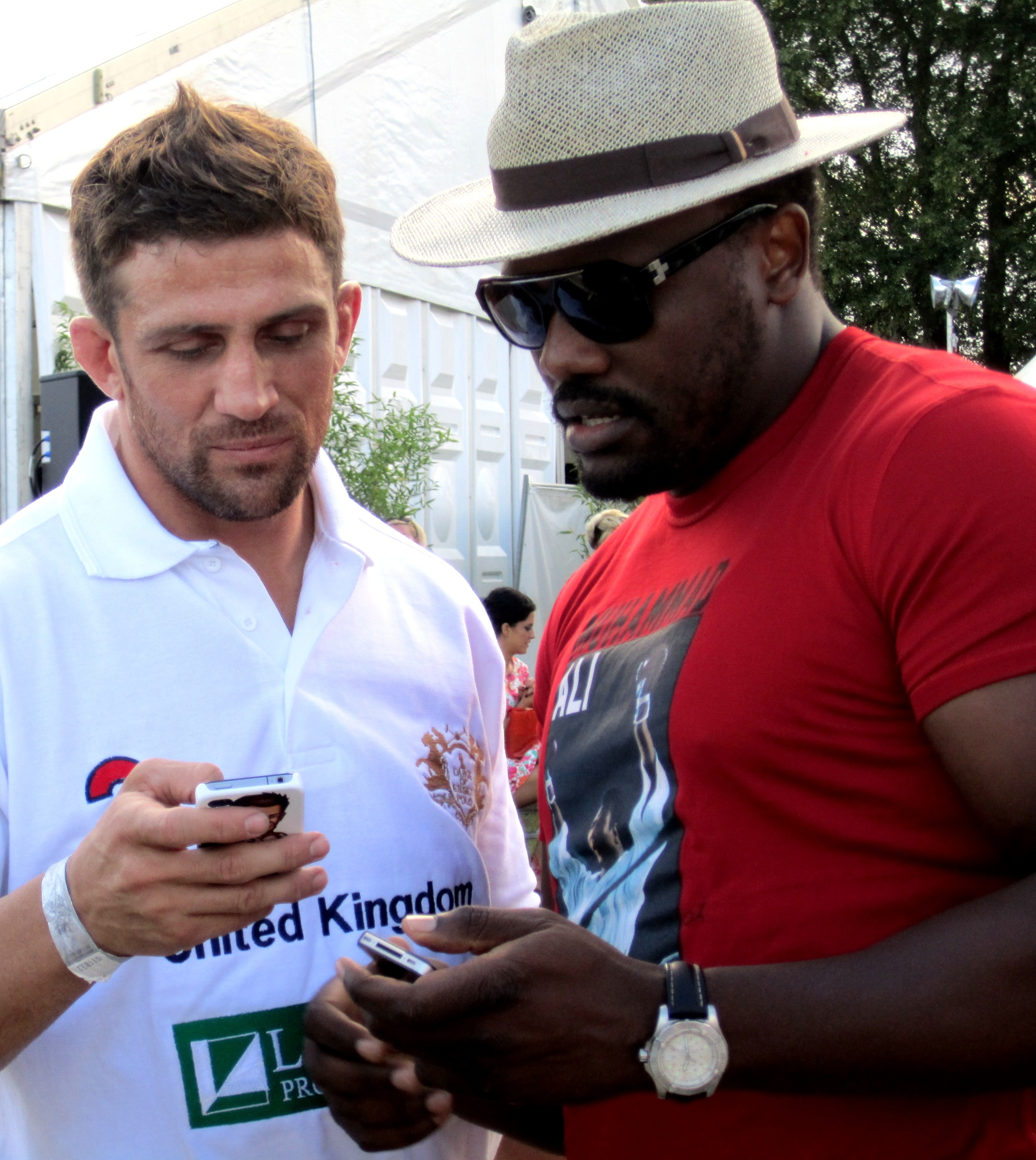
Alex Reid (left) with Derek Chisora in 2011

Reid played Jason Cunliffe in the Channel 4 soap-opera Hollyoaks in 2001. He appeared in the comedy series My Hero in 2002. In August 2009, Reid courted controversy in the British press over an explicit rape scene he filmed for an upcoming gangster film, Killer Bitch By November, it was announced that Reid had walked away from the film, leaving many of his scenes unfilmed. The film struggled with the British Board of Film Classification over rating and content, but was eventually released with Reid's scene intact, although Reid himself didn't support the film and didn't attend the official premiere.

After appearing in the TV Series Drifters (2016), as himself, Reid appeared in Dangerous Game and Retribution, both with Calum Best He last appeared as Ernesto in Sensation, which was released in US cinemas in December 2021.

=== Mixed martial arts ===
Reid first got into martial arts at 14 and subsequently turned to mixed martial arts: "It was just a natural progression. I started off doing Kung Fu, Karate-style tournaments before moving on to Boxing, Kickboxing, a little bit of Judo, Jiu-Jitsu. MMA was a natural progression for a young lad wanting to find the latest and best style. It's just the most efficient and effective blend of martial arts really." He participated in mixed martial arts promotions Cage Rage, BAMMA and UCMMA and made his professional mixed martial arts debut in 2000.

Between 2004 and 2007, Reid appeared in the Cage Rage Championships. During this period, he achieved a record of 8 wins and 2 losses. On 22 September 2007, Reid faced Matt Ewin for the Cage Rage British Middleweight Championship at Cage Rage 23: Unbelievable, where he lost by decision.

=== Return to mixed martial arts ===
On 15 May 2010, Reid was scheduled to return to the cage professionally for the first time since 2007 to face Tom "Kong" Watson for the vacant BAMMA Middleweight Championship at BAMMA 3. However, Reid injured his knee while filming his documentary TV series Alex Reid: The Fight of His Life and was forced to pull out of the Reid-Watson fight and he was replaced by Matt Horwich.

On 14 May 2011, Reid announced his retirement from MMA at an UCMMA 20 event in London. However, he did not rule out a return to the sport in future. His retirement was short lived, as he accepted a challenge from Jason Barrett at UCMMA 22. During the weigh-ins the day prior to the 2011 fight, both men weighed in at just under the 13 st 3 lb mark, being 13 st 2 lb and 13 st 1 lb respectively. On 6 August, Reid defeated Jason Barrett, via triangle choke in the first round, marking his first win in 6 years in MMA. On 16 July 2016, Reid made his return to MMA for the first time in nearly four years.

=== Celebrity Big Brother ===
On 3 January 2010, Reid became one of twelve housemates in Channel 4's 7th and final series of Celebrity Big Brother. Reid managed to win over the public and on 29 January he won the show with 65% of the vote beating the bookies favourites Dane Bowers and Vinnie Jones to be awarded most successful Celebrity Big Brother winner by public vote.

== Personal life ==
Reid began dating British media personality Katie Price in July 2009, thus becoming embroiled in intense tabloid publicity in Britain following Price's divorce from Peter Andre, her first husband. In February 2010, Reid and Price married in Las Vegas. Price announced they had separated in January 2011 and finalized their divorce on March 2012.

Reid later began dating glamour model and fellow Celebrity Big Brother winner Chantelle Houghton. On 17 June 2012, Houghton gave birth to a daughter. The couple separated in October 2012.

In March 2021, Reid disclosed that he had been diagnosed with autism at the age of 45.

In April 2021, Reid was sentenced to eight weeks, half of which to be served in prison, for contempt of court after making a false statement in a claim for compensation after a car crash.

Reid and his fiancée, Nikki Manashe have a daughter born in 2021 and twin boys born in 2023.

== Mixed martial arts record ==
Professional record breakdown
22 matches	10 wins	10 losses
By knockout	3	3
By submission	5	1
By decision	2	6
Draws	1	
No contests	1	

Res.	Record	Opponent	Method	Event	Date	Round	Time	Location	Notes
Loss	10–10–1 (1)	Manuel Garcia	Decision (unanimous)	Bellator 158	16 July 2016	3	5:00	London, England	
Win	10–9–1 (1)	Sam Boo	Decision (unanimous)	BAMMA 11	1 December 2012	3	5:00	Birmingham, England	
Win	9–9–1 (1)	Jason Barrett	Submission (triangle choke)	UCMMA 22: Warrior Creed	6 August 2011	1	2:19	London, England	
Loss	8–9–1 (1)	Tom Watson	Decision (unanimous)	BAMMA 4	25 September 2010	5	5:00	Birmingham, England	For the BAMMA World Middleweight Championship.
Loss	8–8–1 (1)	Matt Ewin	Decision (unanimous)	Cage Rage 23	22 September 2007	3	5:00	London, England	For the Cage Rage British Middleweight Championship.
Loss	8–7–1 (1)	Murilo Rua	TKO (doctor stoppage)	Cage Rage 21	21 April 2007	1	0:28	London, England	
Loss	8–6–1 (1)	Xavier Foupa-Pokam	Decision (unanimous)	Cage Rage 19	9 December 2006	2	5:00	London, England	
Loss	8–5–1 (1)	Tony Fryklund	Submission (heel hook)	Cage Rage 18	30 September 2006	1	1:32	London, England	
Loss	8–4–1 (1)	Dave Menne	Decision (unanimous)	Cage Rage 16	22 April 2006	3	5:00	London, England	
Loss	8–3–1 (1)	Jason Tan	Decision (split)	WCFC: No Guts No Glory	18 March 2006	3	5:00	Manchester, England	
Draw	8–2–1 (1)	Daijiro Matsui	Draw (majority)	Cage Rage 14	3 December 2005	3	5:00	London, England	
Win	8–2 (1)	Kyosuke Sasaki	TKO (doctor stoppage)	Cage Rage 12	2 July 2005	1	5:00	London, England	
Loss	7–2 (1)	Jorge Rivera	KO (strikes)	Cage Rage 10	26 February 2005	1	0:41	London, England	
Win	7–1 (1)	Tulio Palhares	Submission (triangle choke)	Cage Rage 9	27 November 2004	1	1:17	London, England	
Loss	6–1 (1)	Mark Weir	TKO (doctor stoppage)	Extreme Brawl 6	21 March 2004	2	N/A	Bracknell, England	Middleweight debut.
Win	6–0 (1)	Jean-François Lénogue	Submission (triangle choke)	Extreme Brawl 5	22 December 2003	1	N/A	Bracknell, England	
Win	5–0 (1)	Mark Day	TKO (strikes)	Extreme Brawl 2	30 March 2003	2	N/A	Bracknell, England	
Win	4–0 (1)	Matt Ewin	Submission (toe hold)	Extreme Brawl 1	15 December 2002	2	N/A	Bracknell, England	
NC	3–0 (1)	Jean Silva	NC (cage malfunction)	Millennium Brawl 8	22 September 2002	3	N/A	High Wycombe, England	
Win	3–0	Mark Singleton	KO (punch)	Yorkshire Fight Night	29 April 2001	1	2:00	Yorkshire, England	
Win	2–0	Kieron McEntee	Submission (rear-naked choke)	Ultimate Fight Night	9 December 2000	N/A	N/A	High Wycombe, England	
Win	1–0	Rosaire Letapin	Decision (unanimous)	Pancrase: Pancrase UK	25 November 2000	N/A	N/A	High Wycombe, England	

== Kickboxing record ==
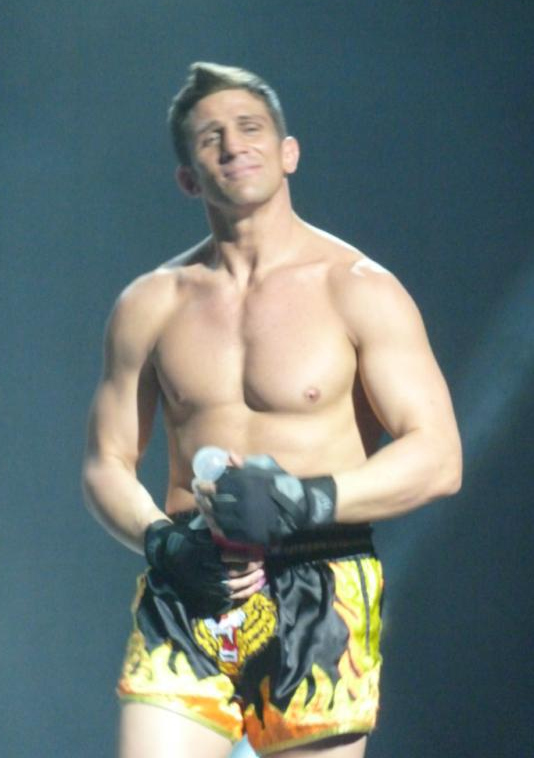
Reid in 2012

Professional record breakdown
5 matches	4 wins	1 loss
By knockout	1	0
By decision	3	1

Res.	Record	Opponent	Method	Event	Date	Round	Time	Location	Notes
Loss	3–1	(England) Rodney Moore	Decision (unanimous)	AKUMA MMA	30 March 2014	3	3:00	Belfast, Northern Ireland	
Win	3–0	(England) Jack Mason	Decision (unanimous)	UCMMA 7 - Mayhem	19 September 2009	3	3:00	London, England	Defends UK1 Middleweight Championship.
Win	2–0	(England) Jake Bostwick	KO (right knee)	UCMMA 5 - Heat	11 July 2009	1	1:55	London, England	Won UK1 Middleweight Championship.
Win	1–0	(England) John Maguire	Decision (unanimous)	UCMMA 2 - Unbreakable	7 February 2009	3	3:00	London, England	

== Filmography ==
Year	Title	Role	Notes
1995	Judge Dredd	Judge	Uncredited
1997	The Saint	Russian Soldier	Uncredited
1997	Tomorrow Never Dies	German Police Officer Outside Carver's Party	Uncredited
1998	Sliding Doors	Waiter	Uncredited
2000	Gladiator	Villager	Uncredited
2001	Hollyoaks	Jason Cunliffe	TV Series
2001	Hollyoaks: Indecent Behaviour	Jason Cunliffe	TV Movie
2002	My Hero	Young George	TV Series
2010	Celebrity Big Brother 7	Contestant	Series 7 - Winner
2010	Killer Bitch	Alex	Direct to DVD
2012	Iron Monk	Fighter	Direct to DVD
2012	Made in Wales	Celtic Warrior	TV Series
2015	The Hotel	Wrestler	TV Series
2016	Drifters	Himself	TV Series
2017	Dangerous Game	Chairman	Direct to DVD
2017	Retribution	Eddie	Direct to DVD
2019	The Seven	Wayne	Direct to DVD
2021	Sensation	Ernesto	

== See also ==
- List of male mixed martial artists

Preceded by Ulrika Jonsson	Celebrity Big Brother Winner; Series 7 (2010)	Succeeded by Paddy Doherty
