= Dixi (TV series) =

- Genre: Children's; Comedy; Mystery
- Created by: Nina Metivier; Dan Berlinka
- Directed by: Dan Berlinka
- Starring: Claudia Jessie; Jordan Loughran; Kerry Boyne; April Hughes; Bethan Wright; Alexander Nicolaou
- Country of origin: United Kingdom
- Original language: English
- No. of series: 5
- No. of episodes: 130

Production
- Executive producers: Melanie Stokes; Anne Brogan; Sue Nott
- Producers: Nina Metivier; Dan Berlinka
- Running time: 3 minutes
- Production company: Kindle Entertainment

Original release
- Network: CBBC Online
- Release: 2014 – 2021

Dixi is an interactive web programme for children age 7–14 that premiered on CBBC Online in 2014, that ran for 5 series, and 130 episodes. The series was produced by Kindle Entertainment.

== Series synopsis ==
Dixi started on 24 February 2014 and is viewable on mobile, tablet and desktop platforms in the UK. There were 30 webisodes in total in the first series, which became available to watch over three weeks. Series 1 centres around Shari and others getting hacked. The culprit is Mimi's mum due to being offended over others including Shari calling Mimi 'Me Too Mimi'.

Dixi then returned for a second series. Dixi 2: Dixi Unchained, launched on Safer Internet Day, 10 February 2015 – with new vlogs and episodes uploaded to the CBBC website every weekday until 6 March 2015. Series 2 is about Mimi and others getting creepy messages from a cyber ghost called "Alice", the culprit is Connie, the sister of prime suspect Kat. This is because Connie wanted to become close to Kat again.

The launch of Dixi:3 - Game of Dixi coincided with Safer Internet Day 2016: 15 February with new vlogs, profiles and interactive content uploaded daily until 5 March Series 3 is about The Nameless One bullying people online and the Grim Griefer bullying Chloe and Syd in their game World Of Orc Craft. The culprit is Perry because of humiliation of being in viral video 'Game Over Boy', a video where he falls over while wearing a homemade robot costume.

In late 2016, a prequel to the fourth series was launched over the CBBC website, called Dixi 4 Extra. In July 2017, another prequel to the series was also launched over the CBBC website, called Dixi 4 Escape. This, however, was in a different format to usual where all of the characters were stuck in an Escape Room and the audience had to help to get them out by choosing what to do.

The full thirty episode series then began in October 2017, named Dixi: Friends 4 Ever. This series introduced new characters to the programme, as well as a few of old faces returning. This series was promoted like with Series 1–3, with TV adverts on CBBC and announcements and clips being released on the official CBBC website. Series 4 is about Billie and Selene being framed for trashing Miss Malik's office and the student president elections, as well as Amani's fake boyfriend Alessandro being hacked. Billie is forced to drop out. Blake is Alessandro and Billie's friend Abi is the shredder because of her dad being ill. Echo/Emma wins the election.

Then Dixi: Dracula was released, it was a cover of Dracula by Bram Stoker in 2018.

== Broadcast ==
In 2016, TV Episodes were released - Season 1 + 2 were released on TV (featuring 10 episodes on TV) and in 2017, there were 12 episodes of Dixi 3. In 2018 there were 13 episodes of Dixi: Friends4Ever. It is a television version of the mock social network 'Dixi' with friends, comments and all the mystery episodes.

== Cast ==
- Claudia Jessie as Shari
- Jordan Loughran as Eve
- Kerry Boyne as Isla
- April Hughes as Mimi
- Bethan Wright as Chloe
- Alexander Nicolaou as Syd
- Joseph Ashworth as Murdo
- Martin Bobb-Semple as Zane
- Ben Kerfoot as Ash
- Harry Jarvis as Ryan
- Rebecca Hanssen as Billie
- Sereece Bloomfield as Amani
- Annie Guy as Jane
- Alex Thomas Smith as Baxter/Bubs
- Imogen Gurney as Abi
- Sam Hallion as Blake
- Sophia Capasso as Selene

=== Additional cast - Dixi:Friends4ever ===
- Marli Siu as Echo
- Scott Folan as Django
- Rhianne Barreto as Scarlet
- Declan Peter Wyer as Viktor
- Shireen Azarmi as Ms Malik
- Darren Strange as Mr. Williams
- David Persiva as Mr. Hayworth
- Mollie Lambert as Addie
- Romario Simpson as Shak
- Adina Vlad as Lace

== Award ==
It won the BAFTA award for Original Interactive Show in 2014.
