= Jacqueline Moody =

Businesswoman

Jacqueline Moody is a writer, editor and producer. She is the founder and CEO of YadaYadaCo., which provides editorial, production and content development services in the children’s media space. She co-created and wrote for the children's television show WordWorld, which aired in over 90 countries.

== Career ==
Moody studied creative writing and playwriting at Lehman College, City University of New York. In addition to her work in television, she also worked as an editor and writer for the children’s book publisher Soundprints, serving clients including Disney and the Smithsonian Institution.

== WordWorld ==
Moody was co-creator, head writer, and executive producer of WordWorld in association with her cousin Don Moody. In 2005, WordWorld was the recipient of IKEA after their study concluded that the show “significantly strengthens early literacy skills in preschoolers, providing the building blocks essential for learning how to read".

The series premiered on September 3, 2007, and ended on January 17, 2011, having run for three seasons, containing 45 episodes in total. Peg + Cat replaced re-runs of WordWorld in the PBS Kids lineup in October 2013.
