= The Substitute (2015 film) =

- Directed by: Nathan Hughes-Berry
- Written by: Madeleine Sims-Fewer
- Produced by: Madeleine Sims-Fewer & Eva Sigurdardottir
- Starring: David Bamber; Madeleine Sims-Fewer; Ben Kerfoot; Haruka Abe; Anna Hogarth
- Cinematography: Charlie Goodger
- Music by: Alex Harwood
- Release date: 8 January 2015 (London Short Film Festival)
- Running time: 22 minutes
- Countries: Canada; United Kingdom; Iceland
- Language: English

The Substitute is a 2015 short film written by Madeleine Sims-Fewer and directed by Nathan Hughes-Berry. The film is inspired by Sims-Fewer's experience of life at boarding school and was shot on location at St Angela's Ursuline Catholic School in East London.

The film made its UK premiere at London Short Film Festival and has gone on to pick up nominations at Fantasporto, Imagine Amsterdam Fantastic Film Festival where it competed for the Silver Melies, Dresden Filmfest where it competed for the Golden Horseman and Bucheon International Fantastic Film Festival. The film was chosen to screen at the Cannes Film Festival as part of Telefilm Canada's Not Short on Talent programme.

== Synopsis ==
A young teacher takes a job at an unusual private school where she soon discovers that the boys have a sinister power over the girls. As the boys behaviour becomes increasingly threatening she uncovers the source of the girls fear; an ominous locked door at the back of the classroom.

== Awards ==
- Best Short Screenplay (Second Place) - Slamdance Screenplay Competition
- Best Screenplay - Canadian Film Fest
- Best Short Drama (Winner) - The Smalls Film Festival
- Best Short Film/Screenplay/Director - Little Rock Fantastic Cinema
- Best Short Film - Nitehawk Shorts Festival
- Best Short Film - Waves of Horror Film Festival
- Best Supporting Actor - British Horror Film Festival
- Honorable Mention - Brno16 Film Festival
- Special Mention - Corto Helvetico Al Femminile
