= Bethan Wright =

English actress and model

- Born: Bethan Mary Wright; 30 January 1996 (age 30); Northampton, East Midlands, England
- Education: Sylvia Young Theatre School; Spratton Hall School
- Occupations: Actress; model
- Years active: 2014–2021
- Known for: The Lodge
- Spouse: Sean Havens (m. 2021)

Bethan Mary Wright (born 30 January 1996) is an English actress and model. She is known for portraying the roles of Chloe in the CBBC series Dixi and Danielle Clark in the Disney Channel musical drama The Lodge.

== Early life and education ==
Wright was born in Northampton on 30 January 1996. At the age of four, she started taking ballet and tap classes and took part in various talent shows. She attended Spratton Hall School nearby and then Sylvia Young Theatre School in London.

== Career ==
Wright's career began in modeling, featuring in adverts for companies such as Clarks, Canon, and Philadelphia. She was also featured in a marketing campaign for Marks & Spencer. She later became the face of Pretty Polly's sleepwear and lingerie collection.

Wright made her television debut in Dixi, playing the main role of Chloe from 2014 to 2016. She later had minor roles in two films, Breakdown and Between Two Worlds. In 2016, Wright was cast in the Disney Channel musical drama The Lodge as Danielle Clark. From 2019 to 2020, Wright had a recurring voice role in the Disney Channel cartoon 101 Dalmatian Street, voicing the role of Prunella Pug.

== Filmography ==
Year	Title	Role	Notes
2014–2016	Dixi	Chloe	Main role
2016	Breakdown	Sinead	Film
2016	Between Two Worlds	Emily	Film
2016–2017	The Lodge	Danielle Clark	Main role
2019–2020	101 Dalmatian Street	Prunella Pug (voice)	Recurring role
2021	Sensation	Rebecca	Film
