= WordWorld =

American animated children's television series

- Genre: Educational; Children's television series
- Created by: Don Moody; Jacqueline Moody; Peter Schneider; Gary Friedman
- Developed by: Don Moody; Olexa Hewryk; Jacqueline Moody; Tina Peel
- Directed by: Olexa Hewryk
- Narrated by: H.D. Quinn
- Theme music composer: Billy Straus
- Composers: Nick Balaban; Nathaniel Reichman
- Country of origin: United States
- Original language: English
- No. of seasons: 3
- No. of episodes: 45

Production
- Executive producers: Don Moody; Jacqueline Moody; Olexa Hewyrk; Sue Hollenberg
- Producers: Sue Hollenberg; Alia Nakashima
- Running time: 28 minutes
- Production companies: Word World, LLC; The Learning Box; WTTW Chicago

Original release
- Network: PBS Kids
- Release: September 3, 2007 – January 17, 2011

WordWorld is an American animated educational preschool television series. The series was created by Don Moody, Jacqueline Moody, Peter Schneider and Gary Friedman, it was produced by Word World, LLC, The Learning Box and WTTW for PBS Kids.

It aired on PBS Kids from September 3, 2007, to January 17, 2011, with PBS later airing reruns on the 24/7 PBS Kids channel where it ran through October 2, 2022. The series consisted of three seasons and 45 episodes (84 segments total).

== Premise ==
In the series, when letters are combined to spell words, they morph into the shape of the corresponding object. The animal characters and many objects are made of letters, and are respectively called WordFriends and WordThings. The main setting is a planet that has two landmasses in the shape of Ws for WordWorld; despite its name, WordFriends and WordThings also exist in outer space. In each episode, the characters have a cartoonish adventure, and ultimately must "build a word" using synthetic phonics to solve a problem. Some episodes focus on concepts such as rhymes, compound words, and plural formation with -s.

WordWorld is designed to teach children how to spell. In non-English speaking countries, it is designed to teach children English as a second language.

== Cast ==
- H.D. Quinn as the Narrator, Dog, Fly, Duck, Ant, and Cow
- Lenore Zann as Bear (Season 1) and Kangaroo
- George Bailey as Pig, Bug and Monkey
- Daryl Ekroth as Frog
- Mirm Kriegel as Bear (Seasons 2–3) and Caterpillar
- Heidi Blickenstaff as Sheep and Bee (both Season 1)
- Veronica Taylor as Sheep (Seasons 2–3) and Bird
- Duffy Ozar as Bee (Seasons 2–3)
- Kate Brewer as Cat and Spider
- Esther Lucille as Elephant
- Marc Thompson as Shark, Robot, Fox, Monster and Turtle (Season 2)
- Zoe Martin as Fish and Whale
- Billy Rippy as Turtle (Season 1)
- Willie Martinez as Crab
- Michele O. Laikowski and Becky Poole as Pig's Nephews
- Sean Schemmel as Goat

== Episodes ==
WordWorld consists of 45 episodes, 26 in the first season, 14 in the second, and 5 in the third. 6 of the second season's segments are merely repeats from the first season, with 22 original segments produced for the second season. There are 84 original segments total.

=== Series overview ===
Season	Segments	Episodes	Originally released	
Season	Segments	Episodes	First released	Last released
1	52	26	September 3, 2007	December 1, 2008
2	28	14	February 13, 2009	December 28, 2009
3	10	5	October 4, 2010	January 17, 2011

=== Season 1 (2007–08) ===
No. overall	No. in season	Title	Build a Word	Music video	Original release date
1	1	"Runaway O"	Box Cake	Dancing Dog	September 3, 2007
1	1	"Happy Birthday, Dog!"	Box Cake	Dancing Dog	September 3, 2007
When Sheep and Bear open Cat's box of "O's", one rolls away, sending them on a madcap chase to catch it before Cat wakes up. It's Dog's birthday and all of his friends are planning a surprise party. However, when the cake flips around and breaks the letters, everyone panics. Meanwhile, Frog must get to the party safely without Dog finding out.
2	2	"There's an Ant in Every Giant"	Ant Pot	Dancing Dog	September 4, 2007
2	2	"Chef Sheep"	Ant Pot	Dancing Dog	September 4, 2007
Tiny Ant is tired of being the smallest Word Friend in Word World. When Ant adds the letters "G" and "I" to his name, Ant becomes a "giant" and soon learns that being small isn't so bad after all. During his "cooking show", Chef Pig gets a pot stuck on his face while eating ice cream out of it. Now there is no pot to cook in and no chef to do the cooking. Luckily for Pig, an ever-helpful Sheep is there to take over for him. But first, Sheep must learn to have confidence in herself before she can save the day.
3	3	"Rocket to the Moon"	Rocket Bird	Dancing Dog	September 5, 2007
3	3	"The Birds"	Rocket Bird	Dancing Dog	September 5, 2007
Frog thinks that in order to build a big rocket, he needs big, uppercase letters. But when Frog gets stranded on the moon with the Little Piggies, Frog learns that lowercase letters are just as useful as uppercase ones. Sheep, Bear and Frog go out bird-watching and get more than they bargained for when they find an egg. Sheep does her zany best to care for the energetic egg until the baby bird is born and is reunited with his mother.
4	4	"The Mystery of the Disappearing Pie"	Bear Truck	Dancing Dog	September 6, 2007
4	4	"Duck's Family Reunion"	Bear Truck	Dancing Dog	September 6, 2007
Pig bakes a pie for Bear, but then it goes missing. Detective Sheep is ready to help her WordFriends follow the letter clues and solve the mystery of the disappearing pie. Because they have similar-sounding names, Duck mistakes a truck for a long-lost relative. His best friend Frog is a bit ruffled at the epidemic of silliness going around, but ends up saving the day for Duck and his word "family" when the truck gets stuck in the muck.
5	5	"Sh-Sh-Shark!"	Shoe Ball	Dancing Dog	September 13, 2007
5	5	"Dog Wants to Play Ball"	Shoe Ball	Dancing Dog	September 13, 2007
Everyone is afraid of Shark and won't even give him a chance to prove Shark's friendly, except for Duck, who doesn't know that the letters S and H together make the 'sh' sound. Therefore, he doesn't know who Shark is. When Duck introduces his new WordFriend to the gang, he learns a lesson about the 'sh' sound, while everyone else learns that acceptance is an important part of friendship. Dog wants to play ball, but he is having trouble communicating with his friends. Pig, Sheep and Frog each think Dog wants to do what they want to do. When Bear actually takes the time to listen to Dog, Dog gets his wish and everyone has a ball.
6	6	"Pies, Pies, Pies!"	Pies Log	Dancing Dog	September 14, 2007
6	6	"Waterlogged"	Pies Log	Dancing Dog	September 14, 2007
When Pig promises to make a pie for everyone in WordWorld, he learns a hard lesson about keeping promises and sharing. Fortunately, Pig also learns about the letter S and how it can turn "pie" into "pies". Frog and Pig's friendship is put to the test when Frog moves in with Pig after his log falls apart and sinks. After some silly mishaps, Pig and Frog finally come to an understanding – about how important it is to see things from a friend's perspective.
7	7	"Dog's Camping Adventure"	Tent Vine	Ride the Slide	September 17, 2007
7	7	"V is for Vacation"	Tent Vine	Ride the Slide	September 17, 2007
Dog, Pig and Frog are taking him on his first camping trip. While Pig and Frog are supposed to be the brave camping experts, it is Dog who overcomes his fear and finds the lost letters to their tent in the dark forest. The weather is turning colder, and Duck is ready for his yearly vacation. Duck is not sure, however, how to go. When Bird tells him that he just needs to "find the 'V'," Duck doesn't realize that Bird means a "V" formation of migrating birds, and Instead, Duck is off and running on a wild "V" chase.
8	8	"Snug as a Bug"	Rug Nightlight	Ride the Slide	September 18, 2007
8	8	"Nightlight"	Rug Nightlight	Ride the Slide	September 18, 2007
Bug and Frog can't sleep, that is until Bug tells Frog that he has to be "snug as a bug in a...", but he can't remember the rest of the rhyme. Frog and Bug head off on a nighttime hunt of words that rhyme with "bug"—and wake up half their WordFriends in the process. Bear won't go to sleep, as her friends might lull her off to sleep. Bear stubbornly refuses to turn off all her lights and go to bed. It's not until they venture out into the night that the WordFriends realize Bear is afraid of the dark. Frog solves the solution to Bear's problem, and it comes by joining two words to make a new one.
9	9	"Duck's First Sleepover Party"	Bed Hat	Ride the Slide	October 29, 2007
9	9	"One Hat Fits All"	Bed Hat	Ride the Slide	October 29, 2007
Duck attends his first sleep-over party, but he feels nervous about not sleeping in his nest. After a long night of fun games his friends calm his anxiety by building him a soft, fluffy nest. Sheep practicing her magic act, but she loses her magicians top hat. The hat wends all around WordWorld, Duck and Pig find the hat, which breaks into its letters each time it crashes to a halt. And whenever our heroes put it back together, the hat takes on a fresh, new form. For Pig it becomes a chef's hat—for Duck, a silly propeller beanie. Clearly, this hat is special and could be magical.
10	10	"Dancing Dog"	Drum Corn, Pie, Cake	Circus Sheep	November 19, 2007
10	10	"Pig's Big Moonlight Feast"	Drum Corn, Pie, Cake	Circus Sheep	November 19, 2007
It's the day of the Word World Concert and no one is more excited than Dog, but he feels sad, as can't play an instrument. With the help of Bear, Dog discovers that anyone can make music. When Pig is too sick to cook the Moonlight Feast, his friends step in, but they find that if you don't follow the recipe you may end up in the soup.
11	11	"Boppin' with the Bug Band"	Bell Pit	Circus Sheep	November 26, 2007
11	11	"Shuffleword"	Bell Pit	Circus Sheep	November 26, 2007
Ant is having a band showcase on his radio show. While Bug, Fly and Bee have some really good music, they need a lot of help with their lyrics. Frog teaches the Bug Band all about rhyming and they eventually give a fantastic performance. When Pig and Ant quarrel, Sheep and Dog must get them to be friends again.
12	12	"W Drought"	Water Crown	Take the Stage	January 31, 2008
12	12	"Princess Sheep"	Water Crown	Take the Stage	January 31, 2008
One hot summer day, the WordFriends are using water to stay cool. However, all the letter "W"s vanished, and they can't have "water" without the letter W. Therefore, Sheep decides to lead the gang to hunt who is causing the W drought. Bear and Sheep pretend to be princesses, but they only just have one crown. Although, Sheep promises to take turns wearing the crown and being a princess, Sheep gets royally carried away with playing her role. After Sheep hurts Bear's feelings, she learns to process a true princess who is not selfish, but kind and generous instead.
13	13	"Radio Read-a-Thon"	Book Robots	Take the Stage	February 15, 2008
13	13	"Robots to the Rescue!"	Book Robots	Take the Stage	February 15, 2008
Duck asks Frog to read his favorite book on Ant's radio station, because Ant can't read it himself. When Frog's tongue gets tangled in knots, Duck realizes that he doesn't know how to read, but is able to look at pictures and tell a great story. When Frog discovers that you can make a word "more than one" by adding the letter S to the end of it. Frog becomes a mad scientist of sorts, making more of everything. Frog learns that while having a lot of stuff might seem like a good idea, too much of anything soon leads to chaos. Frog fortunately has a robot who likes to clean up.
14	14	"Pl-Pl-Plane"	Plane Sail, Pail, Nail	Take the Stage	March 3, 2008
14	14	"Mail Mix Up"	Plane Sail, Pail, Nail	Take the Stage	March 3, 2008
Frog and the Bug Band are headed to the beach, but not everything goes as Frog had planned. Frog loses the letters "P" and "L" from his plane and must search through the jungle to find them. After some crazy jungle adventure, Frog realizes that fun doesn't always have to be planned. Duck offers to help Kangaroo deliver letters to his WordFriends, but Duck forgets Kangaroo's instructions and delivers the wrong letters to everyone. Duck discovers that there sure are a lot of words that end with the sound "ail"―such as nail, pail and sail―and that they sure can't be used interchangeably.
15	15	"Pig's Present"	Jet Clock	Monster Maker	March 21, 2008
15	15	"Tick Tock Space Clock"	Jet Clock	Monster Maker	March 21, 2008
It's Pig's birthday and his nephews, the Three Little Pigs, are making him a secret present. Although, Pig promises not to peek, his curiosity about his present gets the better of him, it wreaks havoc all over WordWorld. When a mysterious rocket lands in WordWorld, Duck and Pig pledge to help a robot track down a very important clock. Pig searches all over WordWorld, listening for the special sound that will lead the robot to the clock that will save his home planet.
16	16	"Castles in the Sea"	Castle Coat	Monster Maker	April 7, 2008
16	16	"Get Your Coat"	Castle Coat	Monster Maker	April 7, 2008
While playing in the sand on the beach, Duck and Shark discover the perfect home for Shark: a sand castle. Last night, Shark was sleeping until the castle disappeared. While trying to hunt down the castle thief, they learn about tides and waves from a singing Crab. When Frog dislikes the rain after Duck broke his boat. Duck learns all about words that end with "oat" before finally coming across a word that will allow Frog to play outside in the rain: a coat.
17	17	"Superhero Sheep"	Slide Ship	Monster Maker	April 8, 2008
17	17	"Pirate Ship"	Slide Ship	Monster Maker	April 8, 2008
Sheep becomes a superhero, and Duck is eager to be her trusty sidekick, but Sheep responds that "superheroes don't need help". Sheep learns that everyone needs help sometimes when she gets stuck on top of Pig's barn and it's up to Duck to save her. While playing on the beach, Sheep, Duck, and Shark find a message in a bottle with several rhyming clues that will lead them to a special treasure. The trio follows the clues and rhymes their way across the sea: if only they had a ship.
18	18	"Playing Spies"	Pool Sub	It's Time to Rhyme	May 5, 2008
18	18	"Wee Little Whale"	Pool Sub	It's Time to Rhyme	May 5, 2008
When Sheep and Duck think that Dog has a secret, they decide to play spy to figure out the mystery. As they secretly watch Dog, they discover that Dog wants to build a word with the "oo" sound. Sheep rescues a tiny whale stuck in a seaweed and brings her home to her haystack. However, Whale grows up maybe big-sized and outgrowing Sheep's tea cups, bathtubs and pools. She realizes they must return to their safety to the sea. Sheep proves his whale friend to be bigger, and the two discover a way to continue to play together.
19	19	"The Race to Mystery Island"	Boat Star	It's Time to Rhyme	May 6, 2008
19	19	"A Star is Born"	Boat Star	It's Time to Rhyme	May 6, 2008
Pig and Frog trying to out-do each other results in a big race to Mystery Island. While each WordFriend builds himself several words to thwart his competitor along the way, Pig and Frog both finally come to realize that the only way they'll succeed is to work together. Duck gets a case of stage fright while singing "Twinkle, Twinkle Little Star" and causes trouble for all his WordFriends before Sheep and Ant solve the solution, and soon a "star" is born.
20	20	"Back on Track"	Track Candle	It's Time to Rhyme	May 23, 2008
20	20	"The Rainbow Birthday Cake"	Track Candle	It's Time to Rhyme	May 23, 2008
When Frog looks through his telescope, he notices that Kangaroo's mail train is headed to a broken track. He reconciles Bear and rides her tiny new tricycle to get him to fix the track. Dog, Duck, and Ant and all his cousins climb on board to lend a hand in a nick-of-time. It is Frog's birthday, and Duck makes him a big, beautiful birthday cake frosted in the colors of the rainbow. It requires many cans of frosting and Duck learns Pig can't just throw cans anywhere. They must be recycling and recycle to use the letters in a discarded word to make other words, including candle which Duck needs for Frog's cake.
21	21	"Bit by Bit"	Banana Rope	Pig's Perfect Pizza	June 23, 2008
21	21	"Ride 'Em, Cowbear!"	Banana Rope	Pig's Perfect Pizza	June 23, 2008
It is Monkey's birthday, but Frog has a toothache, so he entrusts Duck and Bug to take his present: a banana, to Monkey's birthday party with him. In their enthusiasm to get to the party, Duck and Bug accidentally break the banana into letters and they find it hard to rebuild a word. Fortunately, Elephant knows a thing or two about big words, and she teaches them to build the banana back, based on the three syllables in the word. Pig, Dog and Duck are playing cowboys. Bear feels frustrated being bad at rope tricks. Dog went to let her sulk, after much practice Bear is a rootin'-tootin', but Pig and Duck have herded Cow into the mud.
22	22	"Play Ball!"	Ball Map	Pig's Perfect Pizza	June 24, 2008
22	22	"M is for Map"	Ball Map	Pig's Perfect Pizza	June 24, 2008
The WordFriends play baseball, but Robot has never played before, it takes time for some practice, Robot learns the game and turns into a slugging machine. After adventuring through the jungle, Sheep and Bear discover they need to get home before sunset ends, but they lose the letters to their map. They have to sound out and hunt down the letters in "map"―but with Adventure Sheep leading the way to get home.
23	23	"Flying Ant"	Kite Stage	Pig's Perfect Pizza	July 7, 2008
23	23	"The Dancing Duck Bonanza"	Kite Stage	Pig's Perfect Pizza	July 7, 2008
All the bugs host an Insect Air Show by taking off to the sky to show off their flying skills, except for Ant. With the help of his best friend, Pig, he finds the right word to give him the lift. Duck encourages Shark, a great underwater dancer who practices to dance. However, Shark flops all over the stage like a fish out of water. Duck must find a way to put on his show and include Shark.
24	24	"The Lost Letter L"	Log Cookie	Ride the Slide	August 18, 2008
24	24	"Catch That C!"	Log Cookie	Ride the Slide	August 18, 2008
When Duck accidentally breaks the "L" off Frog's lamp, he decides not to tell Frog. With the help of Bug and Dog, things spiral out of control, and soon Duck changes his channel to break a lamp, a lever and connects into Frog's log. Duck learns that everyone makes mistakes and admitting them sooner rather than later can make a big difference. While Pig and Ant are making cookies, their bag of letter Cs gets away from them, sending his WordFriends on a wild goose chase all over WordWorld to catch a letter C, it causes is in big demand that day. The good news is that Pig and Ant have to help them out.
25	25	"A Kooky Spooky Halloween"	Bag Dust	Monster Maker	October 6, 2008 (Note: These episodes were first released in A Kooky Spooky Halloween DVD on August 25, 2008.)
25	25	"Sheep's Halloween Costume"	Bag Dust	Monster Maker	October 6, 2008
The WordFriends get their share of scares the night before Halloween, afterwards, Pig sleepwalks and everyone thinks Pig dressed up as a ghost. On Halloween, Sheep makes herself a special costume, while her WordFriends need pieces of her costume for their own costumes.
26	26	"The Christmas Star"	Star Ball	It's Time to Rhyme	December 1, 2008
26	26	"A Christmas Present for Dog"	Star Ball	It's Time to Rhyme	December 1, 2008
It's the night before Christmas, Frog needs a star to hang on his Christmas tree. Duck thinks this will be the perfect present for Frog, he tries to lasso one out of the sky for him. Just as might, Duck is unable to catch a star for Frog, and upsets himself to sleep. But while Frog sleeps, someone leaves him a wonderful present: the letters S-T-A-R. During Christmas morning, all the WordFriends are excited by the presents Santa has brought for them: Pig has a sled, Bear has a doll, Ant has a cookie, but Dog doesn't have a ball. Bear gets filled with the Christmas spirit and makes a sacrifice to ensure Dog be merry.

=== Season 2 (2009) ===
No. overall	No. in season	Title	Build a Word	Music video	Original release date
27	1	"My Fuzzy Valentine"	Heart Bug	Fruit Cha-Cha	February 13, 2009
27	1	"Love, Bug"	Heart Bug	Fruit Cha-Cha	February 13, 2009
When Sheep decides Bear wants to make a special Valentine song for her pal Bear, Bear has run into trouble finding just the right rhyme to finish her song. With the help of Fly, she discovers the perfect rhyme and makes Bear a Valentine song with a real heart. Bug wants to sign a valentine for his favorite Word Friend, but Bug doesn't know how to write his name. With much encouragement from Frog, Bug learns that with a little practice. He can write his name and give his valentine.
28	2	"Duck Saves Spider's Web"	Web Box	Fruit Cha-Cha	March 31, 2009
28	2	"Caterpillar Gets a Home"	Web Box	Fruit Cha-Cha	March 31, 2009
When Duck accidentally crashes into Spider's web and breaks it apart into letters, Duck has to go about finding the letters to fix it. Duck calls Elephant for help, Duck learns that sometimes if you can sound out a word, you can figure out what letters you need to build it. On a rainy, windy day in WordWorld, Duck helps his new friend, Caterpillar, build a home to keep her safe from the weather. But not just any word will keep an itty bitty caterpillar from getting wet or blown away.
29	3	"Bugs to the Rescue!"	Balloon Bike	Fruit Cha-Cha	April 13, 2009
29	3	"Sheep's First Bike Ride"	Balloon Bike	Fruit Cha-Cha	April 13, 2009
Ant and Dog build a hot-air balloon and Dog accidentally floats away in it. Ant elicits the help of his insect friends Bug, Bee, and Fly to rescue Dog and save the day. Bear and Sheep both learn to build the word "bike", and Sheep learns how to ride one for the first time in her life. In both cases, it just takes some perseverance.
30	4	"Duck's Hiccups"	Glass Ants	Fruit Cha-Cha	May 11, 2009
30	4	"Achoo!"	Glass Ants	Fruit Cha-Cha	May 11, 2009
When Duck drinks a glass of lemonade quickly, he accidentally gets the hiccups. So his WordFriends try many tricks in the book to help get rid of the hiccups. Pig is allergic to peaches, and when Sheep brings Pig a big bag of peaches to make pies, Pig starts sneezing so much that Pig can't even tell Sheep what Pig really needs is apples. Sheep tries to guess what Pig needs, imagining a silly array of a-sounding words.
31	5	"Get Well Soon Soup"	Bed Milk	Get Up and Move	May 12, 2009
31	5	"Mmm-Mmm-Milk!"	Bed Milk	Get Up and Move	May 12, 2009
When Ant gets sick, Pig tries to take care of him by making his special Get-Well-Soon Soup. It has all the letters in the alphabet in it, so Pig can build any word that Ant needs to feel better. Pig just has to figure out what that word is. When Ant comes over to Pig's barn to eat cookies, Pig tries to get him to drink some milk. However, Ant doesn't like milk, so he thinks of a way to solve the problem.
32	6	"Get Set for ET"	Jet Piano	Get Up and Move	June 15, 2009
32	6	"Duck Plays the Piano"	Jet Piano	Get Up and Move	June 15, 2009
While sky-writing in his jet, Duck accidentally makes a cloud dragon. Duck and the bugs set out to catch the dragon made from clouds and save WordWorld. When the bugs keep interrupting Duck's piano lesson, he learns that some things are worth waiting for. He also learns that when a word has many sounds in it, it can be built sound by sound.
33	7	"Shark's First Day of School"	Flag Pillow	Get Up and Move	July 13, 2009
33	7	"Shark's First Loose Tooth"	Flag Pillow	Get Up and Move	July 13, 2009
The first day of school for the youngest WordFriends, but Shark is afraid to go. With the help of his good friend, Duck, and with some gentle encouragement from their teacher, Cat. Shark's fear turns to confidence, and by day's end Shark's at the head of the class. When Shark loses his first baby tooth at a sleepover party with Duck, he's got to get to sleep fast so the tooth fairy can come and leave him a present. But there's just one problem: he can't fall asleep. With the help of his good friend Duck and the letter P, Shark finally finds just the word to help him fall asleep.
34	8	"Duck at Bat"	Bat (twice) Roof	Get Up and Move	July 14, 2009
34	8	"You Can Never Have Too Many OO's"	Bat (twice) Roof	Get Up and Move	July 14, 2009
Duck loses the letter B to his baseball bat just before the big game is supposed to start. Duck tries to build other words to hit the ball: mat, hat. But soon learns that you need the right letter with the right sound to build the right word and hit a homer. When two letter O's in Monkey's roof blow away due to the wind, Duck decides to hunt down the /oo/ sound and fix the roof before it rains. With Kangaroo's help, Duck saves the day and learns you can never have too many "oo"s.
35	9	"The Best Nest"	Nest Truck	Take the Stage	September 7, 2009
35	9	"Duck's Family Reunion"	Nest Truck	Take the Stage	September 7, 2009
It's Duck's turn at show and tell at school, and he wants to bring the thing he loves the best: his nest. But when the nest breaks apart into letters, Duck is able to retrieve them all in time. Repeat of an episode aired during the first season.
36	10	"Bed Bugs"	Bed Rug	It's Time to Rhyme	September 8, 2009
36	10	"Snug as a Bug"	Bed Rug	It's Time to Rhyme	September 8, 2009
When the bugs accidentally break Frog's brand new bed, they scramble to put it back together and make things right. They can't tell the letters "B" and "D" apart, but they figure out which letter is which – then rebuild Frog's bed before Frog returns home. Repeat of an episode aired during the first season.
37	11	"Totally Terrific Duck"	Tie Star	Fruit Cha-Cha	October 12, 2009
37	11	"A Star is Born"	Tie Star	Fruit Cha-Cha	October 12, 2009
Bear is going to paint everyone's picture today, Duck wants to look "totally terrific" for his portrait. Frog and Sheep help him build a tie, top hat and tutu – because if you want to look totally terrific looking Duck and brought the letter T. Repeat of an episode aired during the first season.
38	12	"Dog's Having a Party"	Horn Ball	Ride the Slide	November 9, 2009
38	12	"Dog Wants to Play Ball"	Horn Ball	Ride the Slide	November 9, 2009
Dog and Duck want to throw a house party at Dog's house. But all they have is the letter H, and they don't know what to do with it. With the help of Sheep, they soon realize that "H" is a fabulous letter―with it they can make hotdogs, hats, hula-hoops and a great party indeed. Repeat of an episode aired during the first season.
39	13	"Welcome Home, Duck"	Rock Log	Get Up and Move	November 10, 2009
39	13	"The Lost Letter L"	Rock Log	Get Up and Move	November 10, 2009
Frog is excited about Duck's return from a long vacation, and makes a "Welcome Home" banner to hang over Duck's nest. However, the dock connecting Frog's log to Duck's nest is broken, so Frog has to find another way across. Frog tries building a sock and a block to replace the dock, but it's not until Duck builds a rock that Frog can land on, halfway across the pond, that Frog's able to get across the water to Duck's nest. Repeat of an episode aired during the first season.
40	14	"Bear's Bed Sled"	Sled Shoe	Take the Stage	December 28, 2009
40	14	"Sh-Sh-Shark!"	Sled Shoe	Take the Stage	December 28, 2009
Bear is excited about sledding on the first day of snow, but her plans change when she hurts her toe and is unable to ride her sled. It's up to her friends to come up with a solution that will let Bear stay in bed and go sledding at the same time. Repeat of an episode aired during the first season.

=== Season 3 (2010–11) ===
No. overall	No. in season	Title	Build a Word	Music video	Original release date
41	1	"A String's the Thing"	String Jar	Ride the Slide	October 4, 2010
41	1	"J-J-Jelly"	String Jar	Ride the Slide	October 4, 2010
Duck accidentally turns on Frog's new cake frosting machine. Now, they must find the right "ing" word to prevent it from covering WordWorld in delicious frosting. Pig asks Bear and Sheep to make jugs for the jelly pumping from his jelly machine. However, when they move quickly the jugs begin filling up with the purple, oozy treat. The friends are able to find a way to contain all of the jiggling jelly.
42	2	"Hide and Seek"	Lake Kite	Get Up and Move	October 5, 2010
42	2	"Kite Flight"	Lake Kite	Get Up and Move	October 5, 2010
The WordFriends play a game of Hide and Seek where they have to hide behind WordThings that end in "ake". However, Shark is unable to find a good hiding spot. When Frog sails away on a big kite that he built, it's up to Duck and Shark to save him. Luckily, Kangaroo comes to help her knowledge about the letter K to rescue Frog and get home safely.
43	3	"The Really Red Ruby"	Rock Fire	Pig's Perfect Pizza	November 1, 2010
43	3	"Firefighters to the Rescue"	Rock Fire	Pig's Perfect Pizza	November 1, 2010
While tending to his garden, Frog accompanies Sheep on a pretend adventure to find the Really Red Ruby until he is carried away. Then they built a rock and soon discover the actual ruby. Duck and Fly become firefighters and teach Frog to build a firetruck. To have a setup of Frog's telescope, they will earn badges to see fires and smokes. Meanwhile, Ant, Dog, and Pig were roasting marshmallows around the campsite in the forest, until Duck and Fly sprayed water and caught fire, then they earned badges to rebuild a whole fire at night.
44	4	"Think in the Rink"	Rink X-Ray	Fruit Cha-Cha	November 2, 2010
44	4	"X Marks the Spot"	Rink X-Ray	Fruit Cha-Cha	November 2, 2010
Duck and Dog joins the team for Sheep and Frog in their ice skating show. Frog warns Duck and Dog to be careful as they practice, the enthusiastic duo gets carried away, and accidentally breaks the ice skating rink, making a mess with ink before they cleans up. Duck and Dog think up a good solution to rebuild an ice rink before the show begins. Duck must search high and low for his letter X when it goes missing, he accompanies Shark, who has a stomachache. Duck hears the letter X everywhere he goes, but both mysteries are solved when Frog builds an X-ray to look inside Shark's stomach.
45	5	"Race to the Spaceship"	Spaceship Sandbox	Get Up and Move	January 17, 2011
45	5	"Sandbox Surprise"	Spaceship Sandbox	Get Up and Move	January 17, 2011
Frog teaches Robot to get to the top of WordWorld's highest mountain and build a spaceship in time to play spaceship tag. By adding one word to another, both learn how to make a car, boat, and bike go faster. Duck and Dog become curious about compound words when they discover the word "sandbox" is made of two words wreck breaks loose, as they can pull it apart in WordWorld.

== Development ==
In February 2011, one month after the show ended, Word World, LLC filed for Chapter 11 bankruptcy protection, listing liabilities of more than $10 million, including $3.3 million in unpaid debt to unidentified animation and production studios. Word World stated that it would continue to operate as usual while it tried to find licensing agreements regarding merchandise.

== Merchandise ==
In June 2009, World World, LLC appointed 4Kids Entertainment as the global licensing agent for the property.

== Reception ==
=== Critical ===
Emily Ashby of Common Sense Media gave the series 5 out of 5 stars; saying that, "This show is perfectly suited for preschoolers' learning level, and it will entertain them as it reinforces their knowledge of letters, sounds, and simple words. With its imaginative design and with the various font styles used to create the letter-based objects, the WordWorld package is delightful enough to draw in parents almost as readily as kids."

=== Awards ===
2009 Emmy Award Winner Outstanding Children's Animated Program Outstanding Writing in Animation

2008 Emmy Award Winner Outstanding Achievement in Main Title

Three 2007 Parents' Choice Awards: Gold Welcome to WordWorld DVD Rocket to the Moon/The Birds DVD WordWorld Television Series

Creative Child Magazine – Creative Toys Awards 2008 Preferred Choice Award: Barn Bucket Set 2008 Seal of Excellence Award: Pull-Apart Plush

2004 Preferred Choice Award: Pull Apart Plush

2008 Toy Wishes Magazine All-Star Award WordPuzzle with Sound: Duck's Beach Party

Interactive Media Awards 2007 Best in Class: PBS Kids WordWorld Website
