= Living It (TV series) =

- Created by: Gavin Strawhan; May Gibson
- Starring: Lauren Titcombe; Joseph Scatley; Bethany Muir
- Country of origin: United Kingdom
- Original language: English
- No. of series: 2
- No. of episodes: 30

Production
- Executive producer: Josephine Ward
- Producer: May Gibson
- Running time: 30 min

Original release
- Network: CBBC Channel
- Release: 2005 – 2006

Living It is a CBBC School drama series, that revolves around school children lives, The first series contained fifteen episodes and the second series fifteen episodes.

== Episode list ==
=== Series 1 ===
No. overall	No. in series	Title	Original release date
1	1	"Instant Karma"	2005
2	2	"Pressure of the Cool"	2005
3	3	"Dying Of Embarrassment"	2005
4	4	"Cinderella"	2005
5	5	"Please Don't Let Me Be Misunderstood"	2005
6	6	"Drop Bears"	2005
7	7	"Sleeping Beauty"	2005
8	8	"Silence Is Easy"	2005
9	9	"The Haunting"	2005
10	10	"Friends for Ever"	2005
11	11	"Brother's Keeper"	2005
12	12	"Don't Get Too Close To Me"	2005
13	13	"The Present"	2005
14	14	"All By Myself"	2005
15	15	"Kiss The Frog"	2005

=== Series 2 ===
No. overall	No. in series	Title	Original release date
16	1	"Dirty Laundry"	2006
17	2	"Changes"	2006
18	3	"Killer Instinct"	2006
19	4	"Princess"	2006
20	5	"Great Expectations"	2006
21	6	"Mr Popularity"	2006
22	7	"What a Difference a Day Makes"	2006
Ben Kerfoot guest stars as Taylor.
23	8	"Nobody Loves Me"	2006
24	9	"Back in the Day"	2006
25	10	"Aliens Have Landed"	2006
26	11	"Stranger Danger"	2006
28	12	"Heidi Full of Grace"	2006
28	13	"Under Pressure"	2006
29	14	"Phone-Tastic"	2006
30	15	"Body Beautiful"	2006
