= 1998 in UFC =

Mixed martial arts events

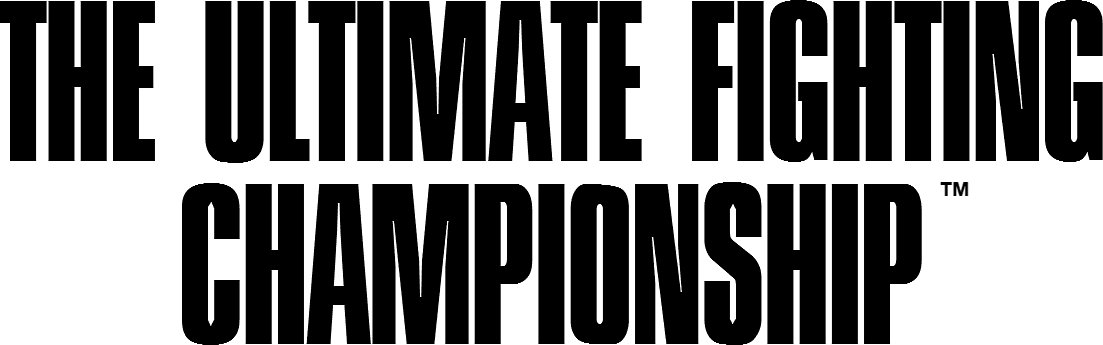

Information
- First date: March 13, 1998
- Last date: October 16, 1998

Events
- Total events: 3
- UFC: 2

Fights
- Total fights: 25
- Title fights: 4

Chronology
1997 in UFC	1998 in UFC	1999 in UFC

The year 1998 was the 6th year in the history of the Ultimate Fighting Championship (UFC), a mixed martial arts promotion based in the United States. In 1998 the UFC held three events beginning with, UFC 16: Battle in the Bayou.

== Title fights ==
Title fights in 1998
Weight class				Method	Round	Time	Event	Notes
Light Heavyweight	Frank Shamrock (c)	def.	Igor Zinoviev	KO (slam)		0:22	UFC 16: Battle in the Bayou	(Note: Shamrock defeated Zinoviev to retain the Light Heavyweight Championship.)
Light Heavyweight	Frank Shamrock (c)	def.	Jeremy Horn	Submission (kneebar)		16:28	UFC 17: Redemption	(Note: Shamrock defeated Horn to retain the Light Heavyweight Championship.)
Welterweight	Pat Miletich	def.	Mikey Burnett	Decision (split)		21:00	UFC Ultimate Brazil	(Note: Miletich defeated Burnett to become the inaugural UFC Welterweight Champion.)
Light Heavyweight	Frank Shamrock (c)	def.	John Lober	Submission (punches)		7:40	UFC Ultimate Brazil	(Note: Shamrock defeated Lober to retain the Light Heavyweight Championship.)

== Debut UFC fighters ==
The following fighters fought their first UFC fight in 1998:

ISO	Fighter	Division
(Brazil)	Adriano Santos	Middleweight
(Brazil)	Allan Goes	Light Heavyweight
(United States)	Andre Roberts	Heavyweight
(United States)	Bob Gilstrap	Heavyweight
(Canada)	Carlos Newton	Welterweight
(Brazil)	Cesar Marscucci	Lightweight
(United States)	Chris Brennan	Welterweight
(United States)	Chuck Liddell	Light Heavyweight
(United States)	Courtney Turner	Welterweight
(United States)	Dan Henderson	Middleweight

ISO	Fighter	Division
(Brazil)	Ebenezer Fontes Braga	Light Heavyweight
(Brazil)	Eugenio Tadeu	Welterweight
(Brazil)	Hugo Duarte	Heavyweight
(Russia)	Igor Zinoviev	Middleweight
(United States)	Jeremy Horn	Middleweight
(United States)	Joe Pardo	Heavyweight
(United States)	John Lober	Middleweight
(United States)	Josh Stuart	Welterweight
(United States)	Laverne Clark	Lightweight
(United States)	Mike Van Arsdale	Heavyweight

ISO	Fighter	Division
(United States)	Mikey Burnett	Welterweight
(United States)	Noe Hernandez	Middleweight
(United States)	Pat Miletich	Welterweight
(Brazil)	Paulo Santos	Lightweight
(Brazil)	Pedro Rizzo	Heavyweight
(United States)	Pete Williams	Heavyweight
(United States)	Townsend Saunders	Welterweight
(Japan)	Tsuyoshi Kosaka	Heavyweight
(Brazil)	Tulio Palhares	Middleweight
(Brazil)	Wanderlei Silva	Light Heavyweight

== Events list ==
#	Event	Date	Venue	Location	Attendance
021	UFC Ultimate Brazil	Oct 16, 1998	Ginásio da Portuguesa	São Paulo, Brazil	—N/a
020	UFC 17: Redemption	May 15, 1998	Mobile Civic Center	Mobile, Alabama, U.S.	—N/a
019	UFC 16: Battle in the Bayou	Mar 13, 1998	Pontchartrain Center	New Orleans, Louisiana, U.S.	4,600

== See also ==
- UFC
- List of UFC champions
- List of UFC events
