= Lion's Den (mixed martial arts) =

American mixed martial arts team

The Lion's Den
- Est.: 1994
- Founded by: Ken Shamrock
- Primary trainers: Ken Shamrock; Guy Mezger- Lion's Den (Dallas)
- Past titleholders: Ken Shamrock 1st King of Pancrase (Pancrase 1994); Superfight Champion (UFC); Guy Mezger 7th King of Pancrase (Pancrase 1998); Roy Nelson IFL Heavyweight Champion 205 lb (93 kg)+ Frank Shamrock UFC middleweight champion, Strikeforce middleweight champion Maurice Smith UFC Heavyweight Champion; Vernon White King of the Cage Middleweight Champion; Joe Hurley King of the Cage Middleweight Champion
- Training facilities: Reno, Nevada; Dallas, Texas; Scottsdale, Arizona
- Website: Ken Shamrock's Lion's Den; Lion's Den Dallas

The Lion's Den is an American mixed martial arts team and training facility that was based out of Lodi, California and San Diego, California. The team was founded in the early 1990s by UFC Hall of Famer Ken Shamrock, and was the most dominant fight camp in the early UFC. It featured fighters such as Frank Shamrock, Guy Mezger, Vernon "Tiger" White, Jerry Bohlander, Tra Telligman, Pete Williams, and Mikey Burnett.

== Establishment ==
The team was founded out of necessity, as the then-new sport of mixed martial arts began to take off in the early-to-mid 1990s. Shamrock, who had fought at UFC 1, had trouble finding adequate sparring partners to prepare for fights. Shamrock attracted the attention of American fighters Vernon White and Guy Mezger early on, and formed the first ever mixed martial arts team in the USA.

In trying to come up with a name for it, Shamrock recalled a documentary he saw about lions. The documentary showed how a group of lions hunted their prey and worked together. He felt his group of fighters should work the same way and be like a family, so he chose to name his gym the Lion's Den.

== "Top of the Food Chain" ==
The Lion's Den was highly successful for many years and was widely regarded as one of, if not the best, mixed martial arts schools in the world throughout the late 1990s and into the early 2000s. Fighters such as Guy Mezger, Ken Shamrock, Frank Shamrock, and Jerry Bohlander all became UFC Champions. Mikey Burnett came very close to winning the UFC Welterweight Championship, losing a controversial split decision to Pat Miletich at UFC Brazil. Guy Mezger was consistently ranked in the top 10 as a Light Heavyweight during his time with the UFC and PRIDE, and was ranked as high as the #6 Light Heavyweight fighter in the world in 2001, behind such notable names as Tito Ortiz, Wanderlei Silva, Dan Henderson, and Chuck Liddell. The Lion's Den was also dominant in the King of the Cage promotion in the early 2000s, which at the time was an upper echelon MMA promotion. Vernon White and Joe Hurley both achieved championship gold in KOTC.

It was fighters who had roots in the Lion's Den that were the original champions in three of the UFC's first four weight divisions. Ken Shamrock was the original UFC superfight champion in 1995, beating Dan Severn, which became the UFC heavyweight championship. Frank Shamrock was the first UFC middleweight champion in 1997, beating Olympic gold medal winning wrestler Kevin Jackson, which is now the UFC light heavyweight championship. Jens Pulver, who trained briefly at the Lion's Den in 1999 before joining Bob Shamrock's "Shamrock 2000" MMA gym and then moving on to MFS, beat Caol Uno to become the first UFC bantamweight champion in 2001, which is now the UFC lightweight championship. Mikey Burnett lost a close split decision to Pat Miletich for the creation of the UFC lightweight championship in 1999, which is today's welterweight title.

Other fighters, such as Tra Telligman and Pete Williams, earned the respect of the MMA world by defeating giants of the sport in upset fashion. Telligman defeated one of Pride's best fighters, Igor Vovchanchyn, at Pride 13 - Collision Course in a stunning upset. After this victory, Tra was ranked as the #10 Heavyweight fighter in the world in MMA. Williams knocked out former UFC Heavyweight Champion Mark Coleman with a high kick to the head in overtime at UFC 17, and eventually earned a UFC Heavyweight Championship title shot. Pete Williams was also ranked as high as the #6 Heavyweight fighter in the world as of May 2000. The Lion's Den was also successful in the Pancrase organization. Ken Shamrock and Guy Mezger became King of Pancrase multiple times, and Frank Shamrock won the interim King of Pancrase title.

The Lion's Den also attracted many top fighters from outside to seek help in their training, including UFC Heavyweight Champion Mark Coleman, UFC 6 tournament Champion Oleg Taktarov, and UFC Heavyweight Champion Maurice Smith. After losing at UFC 5, Taktarov went to live and train with the Lion's Den, and subsequently went on to win the UFC 6 tournament. Maurice Smith, a world class kickboxer, offered to help the Lion's Den with their striking in exchange for help with his submission and ground skills. While training with the Lion's Den, Maurice Smith defeated Mark Coleman to win the UFC Heavyweight Championship, and became the first striker to survive the attack of a world class wrestler. Smith later joined forces with Lion's Den fighter Frank Shamrock to form their own team, called The Alliance. Coleman, after losing two fights in a row to Lion's Den fighters, went to train with the Lion's Den and was coached and cornered by Ken Shamrock at UFC 18.

== Lion's Den champions ==
- Ken Shamrock: UFC Superfight Champion, 1st King of Pancrase (Pancrase 1994), King of Pancrase tournament winner
- Guy Mezger: UFC 13 Champion, 7th King of Pancrase (Pancrase 1998)
- Frank Shamrock: undefeated UFC Middleweight (205 lb) Champion, Strikeforce Middleweight champion, WEC Light Heavyweight Champion, Interim King of Pancrase
- Jerry Bohlander: UFC 12 Champion
- Maurice Smith: UFC Heavyweight Champion
- Vernon White: King of the Cage Middleweight Champion, IFC Heavyweight Champion
- Oleg Taktarov: UFC 6 Champion
- Roy Nelson: IFL Heavyweight Champion, UFC The Ultimate Fighter: Heavyweights winner
- Kevin Christopher: King of the Jungle Middleweight Champion
- Travis Lutter: UFC Ultimate Fighter 4 Middleweight Winner
- Joe Hurley: King of the Cage Middleweight Champion

== Tryouts ==
Historically, the Lion's Den is known for its brutal try-outs. "Marine boot camp is not fun. It is not pretty. That's because they are preparing you for war. I am preparing my fighters for war," Shamrock said when discussing the tryout. Once accepted into the Den, the members would be financially backed by Shamrock, so Shamrock made the tryout very difficult to ensure the fighter was totally committed to becoming a professional fighter. The try out consisted of the following:

- 500 squats
- 200 push ups
- 200 sit ups
- 1.5-mile (2.4 km) run
- Repeated runs up and down bleacher steps
- Bear-crawls up steep hills
- Lugging heavy barrels of water and sand bags up steep hills
- The candidates who were still left at this point would then go on to do as many pull-ups as they can without stopping.
- Candidates then went to the actual Lion's Den facility for several hours of sparring.

Shamrock wanted fighters that could get through this ordeal without quitting, even after their body had failed on them, in order to see how serious the fighter was about dedicating his life to MMA fighting.

The Lion's Den tryouts have been criticized by some for their level of brutality. However, Lion's Den fighter and UFC champion Jerry Bohlander said the difficulty of the tryouts are exaggerated: "Most of those stories are like urban myth. Don't get me wrong, the tryout was hard, but far from impossible. We had a few guys that passed it that would never be good candidates for a pro fight. You had to be in shape and have a great deal of determination. I wish I could give you a good story, but most of them are the type that you would have had to experience in person." Bohlander added, "Most of the horror stories that you've heard were from guys that came in but couldn't cut it."

Ken Shamrock has since adjusted the tryout. Currently, The Lion's Den conducts tryouts by showcasing fighters' skills in a series of drills and live competition put on by Ken Shamrock. The new tryout format allows Ken to evaluate toughness and skill, while making cuts to determine who he wants to represent the Den.

== Feuds ==
The Lion's Den has engaged in a feud with Tito Ortiz. The feud began to build when Ortiz, with his fingers, acted like he was shooting at the Lion's Den corner and coach Ken Shamrock after his win over Jerry Bohlander at UFC 18, and additionally put on a disrespectful shirt in the octagon after the fight with Bohlander. The feud exploded after his second fight with Guy Mezger at UFC 19 when Ortiz put on a shirt that said "Gay Mezger is my Bitch" and gave the middle finger to the Lion's Den corner. Ken Shamrock leaped onto the top of the cage and screamed at Ortiz, angrily waving his finger in Ortiz's face and ordering Ortiz to put a cease to the disrespectful acts. Ortiz's antics enraged the Lion's Den, especially Guy Mezger and leader Ken Shamrock.

Ortiz then fought Frank Shamrock at UFC 22 for the UFC Light Heavyweight Championship. Shamrock defeated Ortiz via submission from strikes, and proceeded to make an obscene gesture at Ortiz's corner after the victory.

At UFC 40, Ken Shamrock fought Tito Ortiz for the UFC Light Heavyweight Championship in one of the biggest and most hyped MMA fights of all time. Ortiz defeated Shamrock by corner stoppage after the third round ended. After the fight was over, Shamrock raised Ortiz's hand and embraced him, seemingly putting an end to the rivalry. However, Shamrock fought Ortiz with a torn ACL (a severe knee injury), and when Shamrock made light of his injury, Ortiz took it as Shamrock making excuses for the loss and they began feuding again. The rivalry did not end until 2006 at Ortiz vs Shamrock 3 - The Final Chapter, where Ortiz defeated a 42-year-old Shamrock by KO due to strikes.

The Lion's Den has also engaged in a feud with Gracie Jiu Jitsu. The Lion's Den claims that their submission fighting style is superior to Gracie Jiu Jitsu, while the Gracie's have maintained that their style is superior. Specifically, Ken Shamrock has been a longtime rival of Royce Gracie, and Frank Shamrock has engaged in a feud with the Cesar Gracie camp.

== IFL Fight Team ==
The Lions Den was one of the camps who participated in the late International Fight League. Coached by MMA legend Ken Shamrock, the Lion's Den took the place of the Nevada Lions when the IFL decided to focus more on a camp-based system than a team-based system. Roy Nelson, a member of the Lion's Den, was the IFL's final Heavyweight Champion before it disbanded.

== Other notable associated fighters ==
- Roy Nelson
- Travis Lutter
- Virgil Lozano
- John Gunderson
- Jason Delucia
- Pat "Bam Bam" Healy
- Herbert "Whisper" Goodman
- Chris Pierce
- Edward Ratcliff
- Shannon Ritch

== See also ==
- List of Top Professional MMA Training Camps
