= 1999 in UFC =

Mixed martial arts events

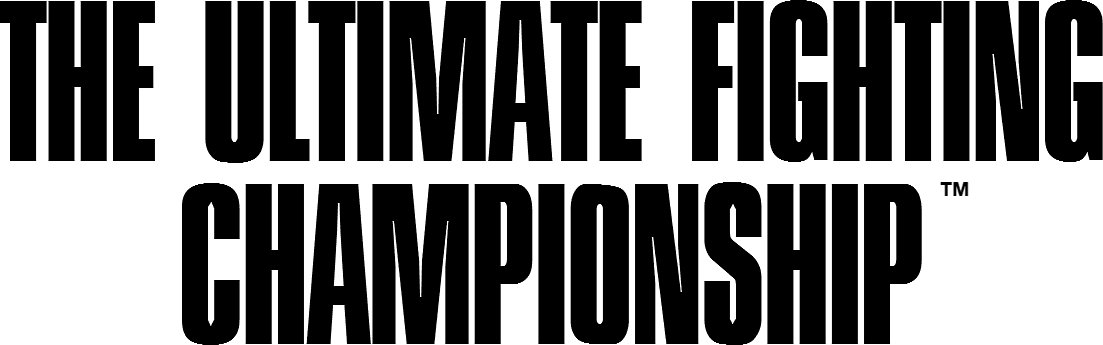

Information
- First date: March 13, 1999
- Last date: October 16, 1999

Events
- Total events: 6
- UFC: 6

Fights
- Total fights: 44
- Title fights: 6

Chronology
1998 in UFC	1999 in UFC	2000 in UFC

The year 1999 was the 7th year in the history of the Ultimate Fighting Championship (UFC), a mixed martial arts promotion based in the United States. In 1999 the UFC held 6 events beginning with, UFC 18: The Road to the Heavyweight Title.

== Title fights ==
Title fights in 1999
Weight class				Method	Round	Time	Event	Notes
Welterweight	Pat Miletich (c)	def.	Jorge Patino	Decision (unanimous)		21:00	UFC 18: The Road to the Heavyweight Title	(Note: Miletich defeated Patino to retain the UFC Welterweight Championship.)
Heavyweight	Bas Rutten	def.	Kevin Randleman	Decision (split)		21:00	UFC 20: Battle for the Gold	(Note: Rutten defeated Randleman to become the new UFC Heavyweight Champion.)
Welterweight	Pat Miletich (c)	def.	André Pederneiras	TKO (cut)	2	2:20	UFC 21: Return of the Champions	(Note: Miletich defeated Pederneiras to retain the UFC Welterweight Championship.)
Light Heavyweight	Frank Shamrock (c)	def.	Tito Ortiz	Submission (strikes)	4	4:42	UFC 22: Only One Can be Champion	(Note: Shamrock defeated Ortiz to retain the Light Heavyweight Championship.)
Heavyweight	Kevin Randleman	def.	Pete Williams	Decision (unanimous)	5	5:00	UFC 23: Ultimate Japan 2	(Note: Randleman defeated Williams to claim the vacant UFC Heavyweight Championship.)

== Debut UFC fighters ==
The following fighters fought their first UFC fight in 1999:

ISO	Fighter	Division
(United States)	Alfonso Alcarez	Lightweight
(Netherlands)	Bas Rutten	Heavyweight
(United States)	Chris Condo	Middleweight
(Japan)	Daiju Takase	Middleweight
(United States)	Darrell Gholar	Middleweight
(United States)	Dave Roberts	Middleweight
(United States)	David Dodd	Middleweight
(United States)	Eugene Jackson	Middleweight
(United States)	Evan Tanner	Middleweight
(Brazil)	Fabiano Iha	Lightweight
(United States)	Frank Caracci	Lightweight

ISO	Fighter	Division
(United States)	Jason Godsey	Heavyweight
(United States)	Jens Pulver	Lightweight
(United States)	Joe Slick	Lightweight
(United States)	Joey Roberts	Lightweight
(United States)	John Lewis	Lightweight
(Brazil)	Jorge Patino	Lightweight
(Japan)	Katsuhisa Fujii	Heavyweight
(Japan)	Keiichiro Yamamiya	Middleweight
(Japan)	Kenichi Yamamoto	Middleweight
(United States)	Kevin Randleman	Heavyweight
(United States)	Lowell Anderson	Middleweight

ISO	Fighter	Division
(Brazil)	Marcelo Mello	Middleweight
(Japan)	Masutatsu Yano	Middleweight
(United States)	Matt Hughes	Welterweight
(United States)	Paul Jones	Middleweight
(United States)	Ron Waterman	Heavyweight
(Tonga)	Sione Latu	Heavyweight
(United States)	Steve Judson	Heavyweight
(United States)	Tim Lajcik	Heavyweight
(United States)	Tony Petarra	Middleweight
(United States)	Travis Fulton	Heavyweight
(Bulgaria)	Valeri Ignatov	Middleweight

== Events list ==
#	Event	Date	Venue	Location	Attendance
027	UFC 23: Ultimate Japan 2	Nov 19, 1999	Tokyo Bay NK Hall	Chiba, Japan	—N/a
026	UFC 22: Only One Can be Champion	Sep 24, 1999	Lake Charles Civic Center	Lake Charles, Louisiana, U.S.	—N/a
025	UFC 21: Return of the Champions	Jul 16, 1999	Five Seasons Events Center	Cedar Rapids, Iowa, U.S.	—N/a
024	UFC 20: Battle for the Gold	May 7, 1999	Boutwell Auditorium	Birmingham, Alabama, U.S.	—N/a
023	UFC 19: Ultimate Young Guns	Mar 5, 1999	Casino Magic Bay St. Louis	Bay St. Louis, Mississippi, U.S.	—N/a
022	UFC 18: The Road to the Heavyweight Title	Jan 8, 1999	Pontchartrain Center	New Orleans, Louisiana, U.S.	—N/a

== See also ==
- UFC
- List of UFC champions
- List of UFC events
