= Uh, vai morrer =

"Uh, vai morrer" (Portuguese pronunciation: [ˈu, vˈa͡ɪ moxˈer]; literally "Ooh, [you are] going to die") is a Brazilian Portuguese chant frequently used by audiences of mixed martial arts events in Brazil, particularly in matches featuring Brazilian fighters against foreign opponents. The phrase is not meant literally, with the use of the word "die" being understood both as hyperbole and as an intimidatory tactic. Commentators have described the chant as an example of fervent patriotism among Brazilian sports fans, as it can also sometimes be heard in football events and other sports events.

The chant originated in football matches in Brazil during the 1990s, initially as the gibberish "Uh, tererê", chanted to a rhythm roughly similar to the chorus of Whoomp! (There It Is), a 1993 hip-hop song by Tag Team which was popular in Brazil at the time. Eventually, the chant evolved to the words "Uh, vai morrer", which was used to intimidate and provoke rivals. The chant reportedly started being used in mixed martial arts events following UFC 17.5 in São Paulo, on October 16, 1998, where it was uttered during the match between Brazilian fighter Ebenezer Fontes Braga and American fighter Jeremy Horn — the first fight of the night to pit a Brazilian against a foreigner —, according to Ebenezer himself in an interview. The chant was also notably heard in UFC 134 in Rio de Janeiro, on August 27, 2011, during the match between Brazilian fighter Paulo Thiago and American fighter David Mitchell.

Among Brazilian mixed martial artists, the chant is mostly received as exhortation or encouragement, and as an example of the country's passionate sports culture, while among non-Brazilians, opinions are more mixed; Mitchell described it as "a bit over the top, possibly", and American bantamweight Jimmie Rivera has called it "kind of fucked up". Others, however, are more appreciative of the chant, claiming it improves the atmosphere of the events and makes them more exciting and immersive, while also appreciating the passion and loyalty of Brazilian fans to their athletes. American fighter Chris Weidman claimed in a 2013 interview to have had recurring nightmares of the chant following his fight with Brazilian Anderson Silva in UFC 162.

== See also ==
- You're Gonna Get Your Fucking Head Kicked In – Another violent yet figurative chant used by football fans in England.
