= UFC 17 =

UFC mixed martial arts event in 1998

UFC 17: Redemption
- The poster for UFC 17: Redemption
- Promotion: Ultimate Fighting Championship
- Date: May 15, 1998
- Venue: Mobile Civic Center
- City: Mobile, Alabama

Event chronology
UFC 16: Battle in the Bayou	UFC 17: Redemption	UFC Brazil: Ultimate Brazil

UFC 17: Redemption was a mixed martial arts event held by the Ultimate Fighting Championship on May 15, 1998, at the Mobile Civic Center, in Mobile, Alabama. The event was seen live on pay-per-view in the United States, and later released on home video.

== History ==
The event featured a four-man Middleweight Tournament, three Heavyweight Superfights, an alternate bout in case of tournament injury, and a Heavyweight "exhibition" bout. A UFC Light Heavyweight Championship bout between current champion Frank Shamrock and Jeremy Horn was also taped for broadcast on a later pay-per-view.

UFC 17 was the last UFC event (aside from UFC 23), to feature the "tournament" style format.

Several hours prior to the event, Olympic Gold medalist and UFC commentator Jeff Blatnick was introduced as the promotion's commissioner in a meeting with the fighters to discuss the fight rules for the event. Blatnick asked at the meeting that the fighters refer to the sport, which at the time had many different names including the misnomer "No Holds Barred", as Mixed Martial Arts, with the intention of improving the sport's image. He then repeated the request to the media covering the event later that night. This is generally considered the first time the term Mixed Martial Arts was used to refer to the modern sport, and Blatnick is widely credited with coining the term in relation to it.

UFC 17 featured the first UFC appearance of both Dan Henderson and Carlos Newton, as well as the first MMA fight for Chuck Liddell.

The title Redemption refers to Mark Coleman's return after losing the UFC Heavyweight Championship to Maurice Smith at UFC 14. Coleman was originally slated to face then UFC Heavyweight Champion Randy Couture, who had to withdraw due to an injury. Lion's Den fighter Pete Williams would step in as a last-minute replacement to face Coleman. Similar to his fight with Maurice, Coleman looked good early on in the fight, but when the fight went into an overtime round, Coleman appeared to be drained of energy, breathing heavily and keeping his arms low—even turning his back to Williams occasionally while standing. He took several hard shots from Williams, and was eventually knocked out by a devastating head kick Williams delivered to the face. The Coleman/Couture matchup would finally take place 12 years later at UFC 109.

== Results ==
Light Heavyweight Championship
Weight class				Method	Round	Time	Notes
Light Heavyweight	Frank Shamrock (c)	def.	Jeremy Horn	Submission (kneebar)		16:28	(Note: For the UFC Light Heavyweight Championship.)
Heavyweight bouts
Heavyweight	Pete Williams	def.	Mark Coleman	KO (head kick)		12:38
Heavyweight	Tank Abbott	def.	Hugo Duarte	TKO (punches)		0:43
Heavyweight	Mike van Arsdale	def.	Joe Pardo	Submission (americana)		11:01
Heavyweight	Andre Roberts	def.	Harry Moskowitz	KO (elbow)		3:15
Light Heavyweight bout
Middleweight	Chuck Liddell	def.	Noe Hernandez	Decision (unanimous)		12:00
Middleweight Tournament Finals
Middleweight	Dan Henderson	def.	Carlos Newton	Decision (split)		15:00
Middleweight Tournament Semifinals
Middleweight	Dan Henderson	def.	Allan Góes	Decision (unanimous)		15:00
Middleweight	Carlos Newton	def.	Bob Gilstrap	Submission (triangle choke)		0:52

== UFC 17 Middleweight Tournament Bracket ==
Semifinals
Dan Henderson	DEC
Allan Góes	15:00
Carlos Newton	SUB
Bob Gilstrap	0:52

Finals
Dan Henderson	DEC
Carlos Newton	15:00

== Encyclopedia awards ==
The following fighters were honored in the October 2011 book titled UFC Encyclopedia.

- Fight of the Night: Dan Henderson vs. Carlos Newton
- Knockout of the Night: Pete Williams def. Mark Coleman
- Submission of the Night: Carlos Newton def. Bob Gilstrap

== See also ==
- Ultimate Fighting Championship
- List of UFC champions
- List of UFC events
- 1998 in UFC
