= Erik Wanderley =

Brazilian mixed martial arts fighter and Brazilian Jiu-jitsu practitioner

- Born: Erik Wanderley
- Nationality: Brazilian
- Weight: 205 lb (93 kg; 14.6 st)
- Division: Light Heavyweight
- Team: Gracie Fusion
- Years active: 2003–present

Mixed martial arts record
- Total: 6
- Wins: 3
- By knockout: 1
- By submission: 2
- Losses: 3
- By knockout: 2
- By decision: 1

Other information
- Mixed martial arts record from Sherdog

Erik Wanderley
Medal record

Men's Grappling

Representing Brazil

World Championship
Gold medal – first place	2003 Rio de Janeiro, Brazil	(Black)
Gold medal – first place	2001 Rio de Janeiro, Brazil	(Brown)
Gold medal – first place	1998 Rio de Janeiro, Brazil	(Purple)

Pan-American Championship
Gold medal – first place	2000 – California, USA	Absolute (Brown)
Gold medal – first place	2000 – California, USA	-94 kg (Brown)

Erik Wanderley is a Brazilian Jiu-Jitsu and MMA competitor.

In 2003 he became the Super Heavy World Jiu-jitsu Champion. He began his MMA career in the same year when he was defeated by Maurício Rua in his first fight by TKO.

In 2005 he defeated Rodrigo Gripp de Sousa by submission in the first round at the Storm Samurai event.

== Mixed martial arts record ==
Professional record breakdown
6 matches	3 wins	3 losses
By knockout	1	2
By submission	2	0
By decision	0	1
Draws	0	

Res.	Record	Opponent	Method	Event	Date	Round	Time	Location	Notes
Loss	3–3	Carlos Eduardo	TKO (punches)	IFC - International Fighter Championship	April 29, 2011	3	1:24	Recife, Pernambuco, Brazil	
Win	3–2	Eduardo Camaleao	TKO (punches)	Brazil Fight 2 - Minas Gerais vs. Rio de Janeiro	August 14, 2010	1	4:02	Belo Horizonte, Minas Gerais, Brazil	
Win	2–2	Johnny Marcus	Submission (heel hook)	BF - Brazil Fight	March 13, 2010	1	N/A	Belo Horizonte, Minas Gerais, Brazil	
Win	1–2	Rodrigo Gripp de Sousa	Submission	SS 8 - Storm Samurai 8	July 2, 2005	1	N/A	Brasília, Brazil	
Loss	0–2	Ebenezer Fontes Braga	Decision (unanimous)	Heat FC 2 - Evolution	December 18, 2003	3	5:00	Natal, Rio Grande do Norte, Brazil	
Loss	0–1	Maurício Rua	TKO (punches)	IFC - Global Domination	September 6, 2003	2	2:54	Denver, Colorado, United States	
