= Mobile Civic Center =

Arena in Alabama, United States

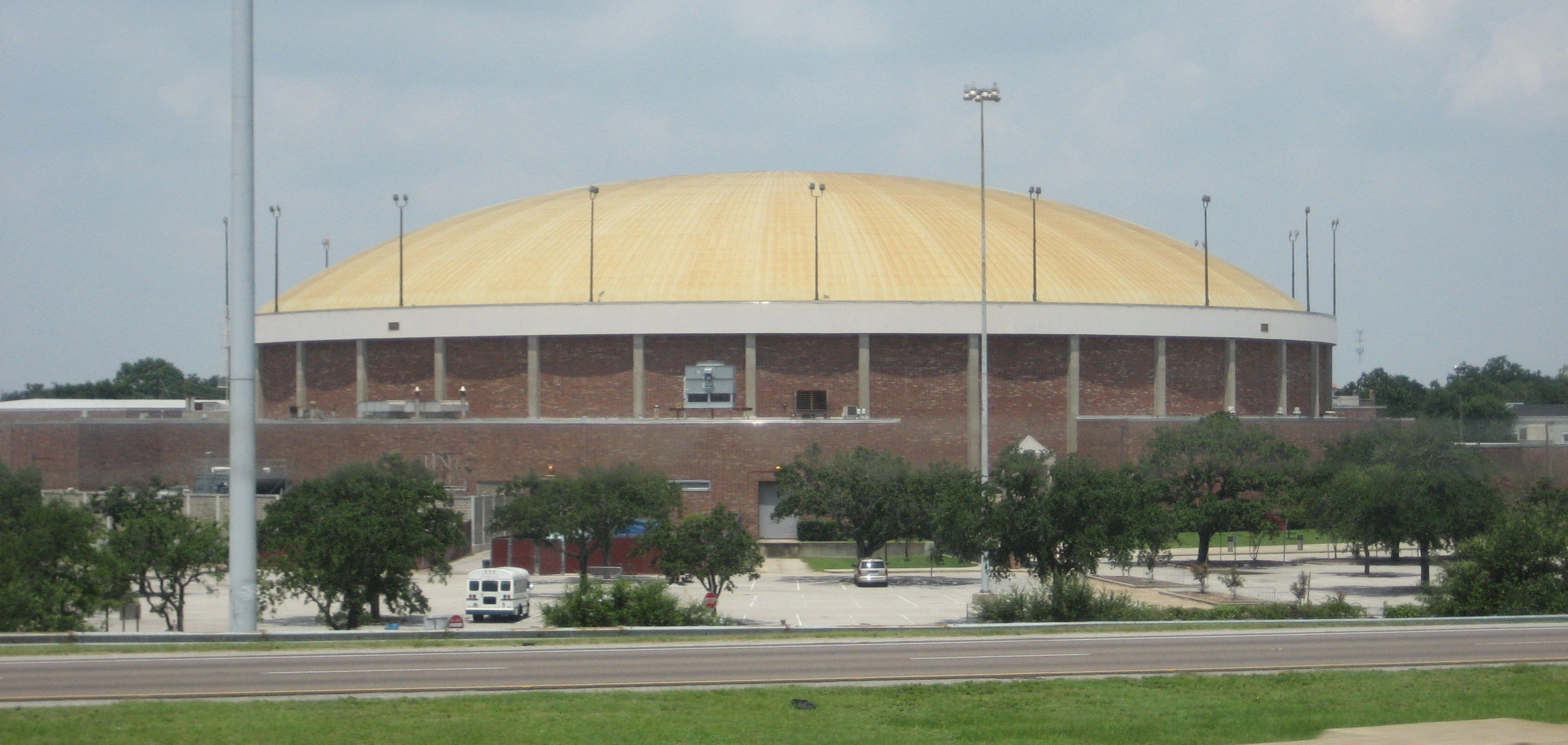
- Interactive map of Mobile Civic Center
- Former names: Mobile Municipal Auditorium (1964–1980s)
- Location: 401 Civic Center Drive; Mobile, Alabama, 36602
- Coordinates: 30.68605°N 88.04478°W
- Owner: City of Mobile
- Operator: ASM Global
- Capacity: Theater: 1,940; Expo Hall: 3,000; Arena: 10,112
- Surface: Multi-Surface

Construction
- Groundbreaking: 1962
- Opened: July 9, 1964
- Demolished: September 2024–January 2025
- Cost: $10 million ($104 million in 2025 dollars)

Mobile Civic Center (formerly Mobile Municipal Auditorium) was a multi-purpose facility located in Mobile, Alabama. Owned by the City of Mobile and operated by ASM Global, the facility consisted of three venues: a theater, an expo hall, and an arena. It was suitable for large indoor events including sporting events and trade shows. The theater seated for 1,938, while the expo hall seated 3,000. The largest venue of the Mobile Civic Center was the arena, which could seat 10,112.

The Civic Center started redevelopment in March 2018. Demolition of the arena, expo hall and theater began in September 2024 and will be replaced with Regions Arena, a $300 million arena targeted to open in 2027.

== Background ==
The structure opened as the Mobile Municipal Auditorium on July 9, 1964. It celebrated its opening with a Holiday on Ice ice skating show. It was built with the city's longtime Mardi Gras celebrations in mind. The concourse area was often used for balls during Mardi Gras. The building's "entertainment profile increased significantly" during the 1970s, hosting dozens of popular acts, including Elvis Presley, Chicago, Led Zeppelin, The Jacksons, the Rolling Stones, KISS, and Fleetwood Mac. It did not earn revenue however, and it stopped regularly booking big-name acts in the mid-1980s following a fraud scandal.

In 1985 irregularities in the Civic Center's finances were spearheaded by finance director and former Mobile mayor Gary Greenough, who was convicted for multimillion-dollar fraud. The preceding year, the Civic Center posted losses of $435,000. The fraud charges, plus competition from other Gulf Coast auditoriums (in Biloxi and Pensacola) and the city's open Convention Center caused the complex to go into a decline. For years following Greenough's conviction it gave the Mobile Civic Center a bad rap throughout the music industry causing all big-name performers to bypass Mobile opting for either Biloxi or Pensacola.

In recent years, the complex has been called "aging and deteriorating." By the early 2010s, the center ran a deficit $600,000–$800,000 per year. For many years, the auditorium has been used for the Mobile Opera, Mobile Ballet, Distinguished Young Women, Mobile International Festival, and high school graduation ceremonies. Top touring acts regularly skip the complex and it has been without a regular tenant since the departure of the Mobile Mysticks hockey team in 2002.

On January 29, 2015, Mobile Mayor Sandy Stimpson issued a statement announcing that the Civic Center will close in April 2016 for redevelopment. City officials were then in search of a public-private partnership to help fund the efforts. 11 months later, Stimpson delayed the closing by two years, needing more time to find a private partner interested in redevelopment.

Demolition of the facility began in September 2024, with its replacement, a 10,275-seat arena expected to be completed by 2027. The new venue will cost $300 million and feature a rectangular design, three levels with premium seating and suites, and a large balcony to overlook Mardi Gras parades. Plans for the new facility do not include a theater.

During demolition in January 2025, the roof of the Civic Center collapsed under the weight of excessive snow from a historic snowstorm just after 11 am on January 22.

== The Theater ==
The 1,940-seat theater was used for concerts, Broadway shows, and other theatrical events. The Theater was connected to the Arena by a glass promenade. The theater was known for its acoustics, unobstructed views, and backstage facilities. It contained a 90 by 60 foot (27 by 18 m) stage.

== Expo Hall ==
With 28,000 square feet (2600 m^{2}) of space, the Expo Hall was used for conventions, trade shows, sporting events, banquets, and even concerts as well as other events. It seated 2,200 for seating events and up to 3,000 for concerts. It had a 40 by 32 foot (12 by 28 m) portable stage and a dance floor that accommodated 1,500.

== The Arena ==
The tallest building in the complex at seven stories tall, the Civic Center Arena (previously known as the Municipal Auditorium) featured a domed roof. It featured 80,000 square feet (7400 m) of space for sporting events and trade shows. There were 6,120 permanent seats at the arena, which for sporting events and concerts seated up to 10,112. The arena's main floor was encircled by 15 meeting rooms. There were eight concession stands, plus three locker rooms. In addition to trade shows, concerts, and sporting events, ice shows, circuses, wrestling, conventions and banquets could have been held at the arena. The arena hosted the Mobile Mysticks of the East Coast Hockey League, WCW Beach Blast (1992), and Uncensored (1998), as well as hosting the Mobile Seagulls of the National Indoor Football League and Mobile Wizards of the af2. It also was the site of the 1991 Sun Belt Conference men's basketball tournament. The Mobile Revelers played at the venue from 2001 to 2003 until the team folded citing low attendance.

While the Mobile Civic Center Arena was still in use, it served as the Mobile stop of World Wrestling Entertainment, Ringling Brothers and Barnum and Bailey Circus, Disney on Ice and Champions on Ice.

Seating capacities were: Hockey, 8,030; Basketball, 8,000; End-stage concerts, 8,119-9,920; Center-stage concerts, boxing and wrestling, 10,000.

== Notable concerts ==
- The Monkees performed here on August 12, 1967, as part of their 1967 US tour.
- Bob Dylan performed at the Municipal Auditorium on April 29, 1976, During His Rolling Thunder Revue Tour
- Elvis Presley performed at Municipal Auditorium on seven occasions (14 September 1970, 20 June 1973, 2 June 1975 (two shows), 29 August 1976 (two shows) and 2 June 1977.)
- The Jacksons performed at Municipal Auditorium on July 18, 1981, during their Triumph Tour.
- Tina Turner performed here on November 21, 1987, during her Break Every Rule Tour.
- Led Zeppelin performed at Municipal Auditorium on May 13, 1973.
- Guns N' Roses performed at Municipal Auditorium on November 3, 1987, as part of the Appetite for Destruction Tour.
- The Eagles performed at Civic Center during the "Hell Freezes Over" tour May 12, 1995
- Elton John performed at the Civic Center during his Wonderful Crazy Night Tour on March 15, 2016.
- Van Halen performed at the Civic Center in 1980 and 1982.
- The Wiggles performed at the Civic Center during their "Wiggledancing! Live On Stage" tour on July 30, 2006.
- Bon Jovi performed on September 27, 1989, the first sellout show in years following a 1985 fraud scandal that caused big-name bands to boycott Mobile.
- The Club MTV Live Tour '89, featuring Information Society, Milli Vanilli, Was (Not Was), Lisa Lisa & Cult Jam, Tone Loc, Paula Abdul and other artists, made a stop at the Civic Center on June 27, 1989.

Events and tenants
Preceded by Pontchartrain Center	Ultimate Fighting Championship venue UFC 17	Succeeded by Ginásio da Portuguesa
