= Pete Williams (fighter) =

American mixed martial artist

- Born: July 10, 1975 (age 51); San Lorenzo, California, U.S.
- Other names: El Duro (The Tough One)
- Height: 6 ft 3 in (1.91 m)
- Weight: 235 lb (107 kg; 16.8 st)
- Fighting out of: Dallas, Texas
- Team: Lion's Den
- Years active: 1996–2002 (MMA)

Mixed martial arts record
- Total: 18
- Wins: 12
- By knockout: 6
- By submission: 4
- By decision: 2
- Losses: 6
- By knockout: 2
- By submission: 1
- By decision: 3

Other information
- Mixed martial arts record from Sherdog

Pete Williams (born July 10, 1975) is an American former mixed martial arts fighter who fought out of Ken Shamrock's fight team the Lion's Den. Williams was ranked as high as the #6 top Heavyweight fighter in the world as of May 2000.

He has competed in the KOTC, RINGS, Pancrase and the UFC, and was runner up in the 1996 Pancrase Neo Blood Tournament.

== Biography ==
Williams and Jerry Bohlander were on the same high school wrestling team and Williams had started training at the Lion's Den about a month after Bohlander. Williams' favorite submission hold is the kneebar.

Williams was the winner of the "SuperBrawl 2" tournament in Honolulu, Hawaii. He beat Donald de la Cruz and Joe Charles by strikes and kneebar, respectively.

Fighting in the UFC, Williams defeated former UFC Heavyweight Champion Mark Coleman and met Kevin Randleman at UFC 23 for the UFC Heavyweight Championship after it was vacated by Bas Rutten. Williams lost the bout by judges' decision.

Williams has competed in the RINGS organization in Japan and was the runner up in the 1996 Pancrase Neo Blood Tournament.

Williams' fight with Mark Coleman at UFC 17, where he defeated Coleman by a head kick, is recognized in the UFC Hall of Fame in its 2016 Fight Wing class.

== Championships and accomplishments ==
- Pancrase Hybrid Wrestling
  - 1996 Neo Blood Tournament Runner Up
- Icon Sport
  - SuperBrawl 2 Heavyweight Tournament Winner
- Ultimate Fighting Championship
  - UFC Hall of Fame (Fight Wing, Class of 2016) vs. Mark Coleman at UFC 17
  - UFC Encyclopedia Awards
    - Knockout of the Night (One time) vs. Mark Coleman
    - Submission of the Night (One time) vs. Travis Fulton

== Mixed martial arts record ==
Professional record breakdown
18 matches	12 wins	6 losses
By knockout	6	2
By submission	4	1
By decision	2	3

Res.	Record	Opponent	Method	Event	Date	Round	Time	Location	Notes
Loss	12–6	Frank Mir	Submission (inside shoulder lock)	UFC 36	March 22, 2002	1	0:46	Las Vegas, Nevada, United States	
Loss	12–5	Ricco Rodriguez	TKO (punches)	UFC 34	November 2, 2001	2	4:02	Las Vegas, Nevada, United States	
Loss	12–4	Semmy Schilt	TKO (body kick and punches)	UFC 31	May 4, 2001	2	1:28	Atlantic City, New Jersey, United States	
Win	12–3	Rick Mathis	TKO (corner stoppage)	KOTC 7 - Wet and Wild	February 24, 2001	1	5:00	San Jacinto, California, United States	
Win	11–3	Roger Neff	KO (punch)	KOTC 6 - Road Warriors	November 29, 2000	1	0:06	Mt. Pleasant, Michigan, United States	
Loss	10–3	Kevin Randleman	Decision (unanimous)	UFC 23	November 19, 1999	5	5:00	Urayasu, Japan	For the vacant UFC Heavyweight Championship.
Win	10–2	Travis Fulton	Submission (armlock)	UFC 20	May 7, 1999	1	6:28	Birmingham, Alabama, United States	
Win	9–2	Jason Godsey	Submission (kneebar)	UFC 19	March 5, 1999	1	1:46	Bay St. Louis, Mississippi, United States	
Loss	8–2	Tsuyoshi Kohsaka	Decision	UFC Brazil	October 16, 1998	1	15:00	Sao Paulo, Brazil	
Win	8–1	Mark Coleman	KO (head kick)	UFC 17	May 15, 1998	1	12:38	Mobile, Alabama, United States	
Win	7–1	Scott McMullin	TKO (punches)	World Pankration Championships 2	January 16, 1998	1	N/A	Dallas, Texas, United States	
Win	6–1	Joop Kasteel	TKO (knee injury)	Rings - Extension Fighting 7	September 26, 1997	1	8:25	Japan	
Win	5–1	John Renfroe	Submission (armbar)	SuperBrawl 3	January 17, 1997	1	2:56	Honolulu, Hawaii, United States	
Win	4–1	Joe Charles	Submission (kneebar)	SuperBrawl 2	October 11, 1996	1	1:39	Honolulu, Hawaii, United States	Won the Superbrawl 2 Heavyweight Tournament.
Win	3–1	Donald de la Cruz	TKO (punches)	SuperBrawl 2	October 11, 1996	1	6:12	Honolulu, Hawaii, United States	Superbrawl 2 Heavyweight Tournament First Round.
Loss	2–1	Yuki Kondo	Decision (unanimous)	Pancrase - 1996 Neo-Blood Tournament, Round 2	July 23, 1996	1	20:00	Tokyo, Japan	1996 Neo Blood Tournament Finals.
Win	2–0	Osami Shibuya	Decision (unanimous)	Pancrase - 1996 Neo-Blood Tournament, Round 2	July 23, 1996	1	10:00	Tokyo, Japan	1996 Neo Blood Tournament Semifinal.
Win	1–0	Kiuma Kunioku	Decision (unanimous)	Pancrase - 1996 Neo-Blood Tournament, Round 1	July 23, 1996	1	10:00	Tokyo, Japan	1996 Neo Blood Tournament First Round.
