= Mikey Burnett =

American mixed martial arts fighter

Mikey Wayne Burnett
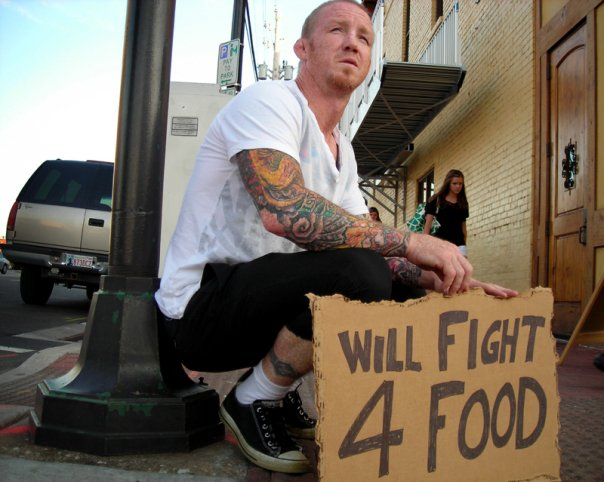
- Born: Michael Wayne Burnett; April 12, 1974 (age 52); Tulsa, Oklahoma, United States
- Other names: The Eastside Assassin
- Height: 5 ft 6 in (1.68 m)
- Weight: 170 lb (77 kg; 12 st)
- Division: Welterweight
- Style: Boxing
- Fighting out of: Tulsa, Oklahoma
- Team: Lion's Den
- Years active: 1996–1999, 2006

Professional boxing record
- Total: 1
- Wins: 1
- Losses: 0
- Draws: 0

Mixed martial arts record
- Total: 7
- Wins: 5
- By knockout: 1
- By submission: 2
- By decision: 2
- Losses: 2
- By knockout: 1
- By decision: 1

Other information
- Boxing record from BoxRec
- Mixed martial arts record from Sherdog

Michael Wayne Burnett (born April 12, 1974) is a former American mixed martial artist who was a member of the fight team the Lion's Den. Burnett lost a controversial decision to Pat Miletich in a UFC title fight for the UFC Welterweight Championship at UFC Ultimate Brazil crowning Miletich the first-ever holder of the UFC Welterweight belt.

== Biography ==
Burnett was born in Tulsa, Oklahoma and graduated from Nathan Hale High School in 1991. He wrestled for three years in college. Burnett was also an amateur Golden Gloves boxing champion in his home state of Oklahoma. He formerly owned and operated Mikey's Gym in East Tulsa. Burnett was the lead MMA and grappling instructor at Apollo's Karate. On October 1, 2011 Mikey opened the new Mikey's Gym located at 3320 E. 32nd St in Tulsa. Mikey was shot in the stomach and groin while exiting a Tulsa gym on Feb. 29, 2016, and taken to the emergency room at Saint Francis Hospital in Tulsa. The juvenile suspect was recently sentenced to 35 years in prison.

== Mixed martial arts career ==
Burnett made his professional MMA debut on April 20, 1996, competing at the third and final Oklahoma Free Fight Federation tournament in Tulsa. Burnett defeated Todd Justice and Tony Hays only to eventually lose to Kevin Nix in the final round of the tournament. Shortly after this, Burnett began to train with Ken Shamrock's Lion's Den in Susanville, California. Burnett's next fight would not take place until the following year at the inaugural World Pankration Championships where Burnett submitted Mike Hipp with a heel hook.

Burnett's success attracted the attention of the UFC, who invited Burnett to fight in their organization. Burnett made his victorious UFC debut at UFC 16, stopping Eugenio Tadeu with strikes in the first round. This fight was nominated by the UFC to appear on the UFC's Ultimate 100 Greatest Fights.

Burnett's performance earned him a title shot against Pat Miletich to determine the first-ever UFC Welterweight Champion. Burnett lost a controversial decision to Miletich at UFC Ultimate Brazil. Burnett returned at UFC 18 where he won a unanimous decision over Olympic silver medalist Townsend Saunders.

=== The Ultimate Fighter: Season 4 ===
After a seven-year hiatus from fighting, Burnett was contacted by UFC President Dana White in 2006 about being on the fourth season of The Ultimate Fighter reality show. Burnett gladly accepted and travelled to Las Vegas for the taping.

Burnett ended up on Team No Love as a member of the welterweight fighters on the show. Burnett ended up breaking his neck during a training session on the show (contrary to popular opinion that Burnett broke it attempting to run through a wall; this is claimed by Burnett to be false.) Burnett was selected to take on Din Thomas in the fifth show of the season. Burnett ended up fighting Thomas with a broken neck. Thomas submitted Burnett with a triangle choke in the first round of the fight. On the final episode, Burnett was informed by a doctor that he required major surgery on his neck before he would be able to continue fighting. Burnett opted to undergo the surgery, which would put him out of action for at least one year. However, Burnett had problems with the insurance company and could not get the surgery done. Burnett later filed suit against the show to help pay for his surgery, but has been unsuccessful in getting the surgery completed and has not fought since.

== Championships and accomplishments ==
- Oklahoma Free Fight Federation 3 Tournament Runner Up
- Oklahoma Golden Gloves Boxing Champion

== Mixed martial arts record ==
Professional record breakdown
7 matches	5 wins	2 losses
By knockout	1	1
By submission	2	0
By decision	2	1

Res.	Record	Opponent	Method	Event	Date	Round	Time	Location	Notes
Win	5–2	Townsend Saunders	Decision (unanimous)	UFC 18	January 8, 1999	1	15:00	Kenner, Louisiana, United States	
Loss	4–2	Pat Miletich	Decision (split)	UFC Brazil	October 16, 1998	1	21:00	São Paulo, Brazil	For the inaugural UFC Welterweight Championship.
Win	4–1	Eugenio Tadeu	TKO (punches)	UFC 16	March 13, 1998	1	9:46	Kenner, Louisiana, United States	
Win	3–1	Mike Hipp	Submission (heel hook)	WPC - World Pankration Championships 1	October 26, 1997	1	0:30	Texas, United States	
Loss	2–1	Kevin Nix	TKO (guillotine choke)	OFFF 3 - Oklahoma Free Fight Federation 3	April 20, 1996	3	2:38	Tulsa, Oklahoma, United States	
Win	2–0	Tony Hays	Submission (rear-naked choke)	OFFF 3 - Oklahoma Free Fight Federation 3	April 20, 1996	1	0:33	Tulsa, Oklahoma, United States	
Win	1–0	Todd Justice	Decision (unanimous)	OFFF 3 - Oklahoma Free Fight Federation 3	April 20, 1996	3	3:00	Tulsa, Oklahoma, United States	
