= UFC 18 =

UFC mixed martial arts event in 1999

UFC 18: The Road to the Heavyweight Title
- The poster for UFC 18: The Road to the Heavyweight Title
- Promotion: Ultimate Fighting Championship
- Date: January 8, 1999
- Venue: Pontchartrain Center
- City: Kenner, Louisiana

Event chronology
UFC Brazil: Ultimate Brazil	UFC 18: The Road to the Heavyweight Title	UFC 19: Ultimate Young Guns

UFC 18: The Road to the Heavyweight Title was a mixed martial arts event held by the Ultimate Fighting Championship on January 8, 1999 in Kenner, Louisiana. The event was seen live on pay per view in the United States, and later released on home video.

== History ==
The event featured a UFC Lightweight Championship (now known as the Welterweight Championship) bout and six other bouts. UFC 18 was technically part two of what the UFC called "The Road To The Heavyweight Title", a tournament, spanning four events, held to crown the new UFC Heavyweight Champion after the title was vacated by Randy Couture (due to contract disputes).

Part one was held at UFC Brazil, with Tsuyoshi Kosaka taking a win to advance to UFC 18. UFC 18 featured the first US appearance of MMA legend Bas Rutten, and the first appearance of Evan Tanner, who would go on to become the UFC Middleweight Champion.

UFC 18 marked the first card where the initials "UFC" replaced "The Ultimate Fighting Championship" in the logo and when mentioned by the announcers/commentators. The new logo used the similar character from the old logo (with hands on his hips instead of punching the globe) combined with the letters UFC on the bottom.

== Results ==
Main Card
Weight class				Method	Round	Time	Notes
Welterweight	Pat Miletich (c)	def.	Jorge Patino	Decision (unanimous)		21:00	(Note: For the UFC Welterweight Championship.)
Middleweight	Evan Tanner	def.	Darrell Gholar	Submission (rear naked choke)		7:57
Lightweight	Mikey Burnett	def.	Townsend Saunders	Decision (unanimous)		15:00
Middleweight	Tito Ortiz	def.	Jerry Bohlander	TKO (cut)		14:31
Heavyweight	Pedro Rizzo	def.	Mark Coleman	Decision (split)		15:00
Heavyweight	Bas Rutten	def.	Tsuyoshi Kosaka	TKO (punches)		14:15
Alternate bout
Lightweight	LaVerne Clark	def.	Frank Caracci	TKO (Submission to strikes)		6:52

== Encyclopedia awards ==
The following fighters were honored in the October 2011 book titled UFC Encyclopedia.

- Fight of the Night: Bas Rutten vs. Tsuyoshi Kosaka
- Submission of the Night: Evan Tanner

== See also ==
- Ultimate Fighting Championship
- List of UFC champions
- List of UFC events
- 1999 in UFC
