= Allan Góes =

Brazilian 7th Degree Coral Belt and Retired Mixed Martial Arts Fighter

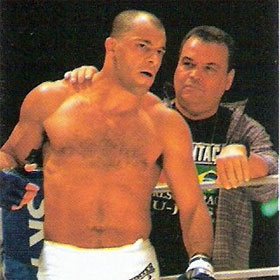
Allan Goes was a renowned student and protege of the legendary Brazilian Jiu-Jitsu master Carlson Gracie, becoming an 8-time Jiu-Jitsu World Champion and a pioneering MMA fighter who brought Carlson Gracie's influential style of aggressive grappling to the United States with the Gracie Family. Gracie took Góes under his wing as a teenager, living with him and shaping his development into a top competitor and the founder of the Carlson Gracie Legacy.

Allan Góes (born April 20, 1971) is a Brazilian 7th Degree Coral Belt in Brazilian jiu-jitsu, instructor, and retired mixed martial arts fighter. A lifelong student and black belt under Carlson Gracie, Góes is recognized as one of the pioneering representatives of Carlson Gracie Jiu-Jitsu in the United States. Over more than four decades, he has competed, coached, and taught Brazilian jiu-jitsu while preserving the pressure-oriented, competition-tested philosophy developed by Carlson Gracie.

As a professional mixed martial artist, Góes competed during the formative years of modern MMA for organizations including Pancrase, the Ultimate Fighting Championship (UFC), Pride Fighting Championships, and the International Fight League (IFL). He faced many of the sport's early pioneers, including Frank Shamrock, Kazushi Sakuraba, Dan Henderson, and Mark Coleman.

Today, Góes is the founder and head instructor of GÓES JIU JITSU CLUB in Southern California, where he continues to teach Brazilian jiu-jitsu, mixed martial arts, and self-defense.

== Biography ==
Góes started practicing Brazilian jiu-jitsu at the age of 7 in Rio de Janeiro, Brazil with his grandfather Alcides Góes, judo master. When he was 12 he was taken to the Carlson Gracie Team and fell in love with the sport embracing jiu-jitsu as a profession, totally dedicating himself to the "Gentle Art". He also trained kickboxing, and got a black belt in judo.

At the age of 18, he got his black belt from the hands of Carlson Gracie. At 19, after achieving World Brazilian Jiu-Jitsu Champion 8 times he then moved to the United States to become a professional MMA Fighter. In the year of 2000, Góes helped create a new team with his old team partners, called Brazilian Top Team.

Góes had his MMA debut for Japanese Pancrase promotion, taking on Frank Shamrock in 1995. Allan scored the first takedown, which Frank followed with one of his own, but the Brazilian threatened him twice with Kimura attempts from the bottom and also threw ground and pound after taking from top position. The shoot wrestler answered sweeping him and clamping an ankle lock, but Góes reversed into a rear naked choke. It marked a controversial instance, as Góes refused to release the hold when Frank utilized a rope escape as by Pancrase's rules, and he gained a yellow card from the referee; moreover, according to Shamrock, Góes eye-gouged him without the referee noticing in order to secure the choke. As the match continued, Shamrock continued utilizing ankle locks and heel hooks, badly dislocating Góes's ankle and making him spend his own rope escape. The Brazilian ended the match taking Frank's back, but the bout was ruled a draw by points.

Allan followed his debut participating in several MMA events in United States from 1995 to 1997, beating Anthony Macias by TKO and submitting Todd Bjornethun by triangle choke. He entered Ultimate Fighting Championship in its UFC 17 tournament in an attempt to challenge for the UFC Light Heavyweight Championship held by Frank Shamrock, firstly facing fellow challenger Dan Henderson.

The Brazilian opened the match dropping Henderson down with a punch, but Henderson countered with a heel hook attempt, and later started landing effective ground and pound through Góes's guard, bloodying his nose. The match ended with Henderson scoring several punches at the overtime, gaining a unanimous decision over the Brazilian fighter. However, controversy arose about the end of the main round, when the referee John McCarthy stopped Góes from locking a rear naked choke after an illegal kick to a downed Henderson. Góes went to claim in an interview that Henderson was passing out in his hold when the referee broke it, and protested about the application of the rules.

After his UFC tenure, Góes went to compete in Japan again, for PRIDE Fighting Championships, and had his debut against Kazushi Sakuraba. The Brazilian lied on the ground for most of the match, but made an excellent usage of defensive guard, throwing upkicks and threatening with submissions attempts. Góes fended away the aggressor Sakuraba and took his back several times, seeking for rear naked chokes, but he was not successful, and almost got caught in an armbar at the second round. The final round saw Góes taking dominant position and being near of another choke, as well as trading kicks with Sakuraba from the ground. As the rules didn't involve judge decisions, the match was ruled a draw.

Another of Góes's highest profiled matches in PRIDE was against Hammer House founder Mark Coleman in 2001. Outweighed by 30 pounds, Góes first tried a capoeira spinning kick before shooting for the takedown, but Coleman stopped him and landed two knee strikes, the second of which knocked Góes off, before throwing three more for the referee stoppage. Some seconds after the decision, believing (under the effects of the KO) that the match was still running, Góes attacked Coleman and caused a brawl, but it was cleared off and they left in friendly terms.

Goes owns and operates Goes Jiu Jitsu - A Carlson Gracie Legacy, in Laguna Niguel, California Carlson Gracie Legacy - Jiu Jitsu & MMA by Allan Goes, is a Founder of TUVA Original, works as a Color Commentator for LFA Brasil, and gives jiu-jitsu seminars throughout the world.

== Lineage ==
Lineage: Mitsuyo Maeda > Carlos Gracie > Carlson Gracie > Allan Góes

== Personal life ==
Allan Góes was born in Rio de Janeiro, Brazil, and comes from a lineage deeply rooted in martial arts and Indigenous heritage. He is of Tupinambá descent, one of Brazil’s original warrior tribes, which continues to influence his spiritual connection to nature, discipline, and tradition.

His early years were shaped by time spent with his grandfather and father, surrounded by music, storytelling, and philosophical dialogue. Their home and his grandfather’s restaurant were gathering places for musicians, philosophers, and notable figures from across Brazil. Góes grew up listening to passionate debates, playing instruments, and absorbing a wide range of ideas and cultural influences. He also spent frequent time in the jungle, developing a deep respect for the natural world. When he was later sent to school, he struggled to adapt—often removing his clothes in class as a young boy, uncomfortable with the structure and expectations of modern life after so much freedom in nature.

After the passing of his grandfather—who had been a central figure in his upbringing—Góes lived in the favelas of Rio de Janeiro, where he faced significant hardship. Recognizing his potential, Carlson Gracie took him into his home and under his mentorship. Carlson Gracie, a prominent figure in the Gracie family, was known for his aggressive, physically demanding style of Brazilian Jiu-Jitsu, which heavily influenced the evolution of modern MMA. Góes became one of Carlson’s top students and was instrumental in helping him develop and refine techniques that are still widely used in modern Jiu-Jitsu today.

Góes moved to the United States alongside Carlson Gracie during the early days of Brazilian Jiu-Jitsu’s expansion, playing a key role in introducing the art to American soil. He has lived in Orange County, California, ever since, helping to build the foundation of BJJ in the U.S. while competing, teaching, and mentoring fighters at the highest levels.

He has four adult children—two daughters who reside in Brazil and two sons who live in California. He was previously married twice and is currently in a união estável, relationship with his partner who actively collaborates with him on his businesses and projects exploring his career, legacy, and personal journey.

Beyond martial arts, Góes is passionate about mentoring the next generation of fighters, maintaining an active role in the community, and preserving the legacy of Carlson Gracie through his teachings and business ventures, including Goes Jiu Jitsu - A Carlson Gracie Legacy and TUVA ORIGINAL, a lifestyle and fight gear brand he founded with his partner.

== Mixed Martial Arts Record ==
Professional record breakdown
17 matches	10 wins	5 losses
By knockout	3	4
By submission	6	0
By decision	1	1
Draws	2	

Res.	Record	Opponent	Method	Event	Date	Round	Time	Location	Notes
Loss	10–5–2	Alex Schoenauer	KO (punch)	IFL: Everett	June 1, 2007	1	3:00	Everett, Washington, United States	
Win	10–4–2	Homer Moore	TKO (punches)	IFL: Moline	April 7, 2007	2	2:56	Moline, Illinois, United States	
Win	9–4–2	Daniel Gracie	TKO (punches)	IFL: World Championship Semifinals	November 2, 2006	2	1:03	Portland, Oregon, United States	
Win	8–4–2	Devin Cole	Submission (guillotine choke)	IFL: Portland	September 9, 2006	1	2:05	Portland, Oregon, United States	
Win	7–4–2	Chris West	Submission (kneebar)	Rumble on the Rock 7	May 7, 2005	1	0:41	Honolulu, Hawaii, United States	
Loss	6–4–2	Gustavo Machado	TKO (retirement)	Heat FC 2: Evolution	December 18, 2003	1	N/A	Natal, Brazil	
Win	6–3–2	Carlos Lima	Submission (armbar)	Meca 8: Meca World Vale Tudo 8	May 16, 2003	1	7:50	Curitiba, Brazil	
Loss	5–3–2	Alex Stiebling	TKO (knees and punches)	PRIDE 18	December 23, 2001	3	0:47	Fukuoka, United States	
Loss	5–2–2	Mark Coleman	KO (knees)	PRIDE 13	March 25, 2001	1	1:19	Saitama, Japan	
Win	5–1–2	Vernon White	Decision (unanimous)	PRIDE 9	June 4, 2000	2	10:00	Nagoya, Japan	
Win	4–1–2	Carl Malenko	Submission (arm-triangle choke)	PRIDE 8	November 21, 1999	1	9:16	Tokyo, Japan	
Draw	3–1–2	Kazushi Sakuraba	Draw	PRIDE 4	October 11, 1998	3	10:00	Tokyo, Japan	
Loss	3–1–1	Dan Henderson	Decision (unanimous)	UFC 17	May 15, 1998	1	15:00	Mobile, Alabama, United States	
Win	3–0–1	Todd Bjornethun	Submission (triangle choke)	EF 4: Extreme Fighting 4	March 28, 1997	1	0:30	Des Moines, Iowa, United States	
Win	2–0–1	Matt Andersen	Submission (triangle choke)	EC 3: Extreme Challenge 3	February 15, 1997	1	5:59	Davenport, Iowa, United States	
Win	1–0–1	Anthony Macias	TKO (submission to punches)	EF 3: Extreme Fighting 3	October 18, 1996	1	3:52	Tulsa, Oklahoma, United States	
Draw	0–0–1	Frank Shamrock	Draw	Pancrase: Eyes Of Beast 4	May 13, 1995	1	10:00	Urayasu, Japan	
