= Ginásio da Portuguesa =

Arena in São Paulo, Brazil

Coordinates: 23.520133°S 46.620289°W

- Interactive map of Ginásio da Portuguesa
- Location: São Paulo, Brazil
- Capacity: 8,500

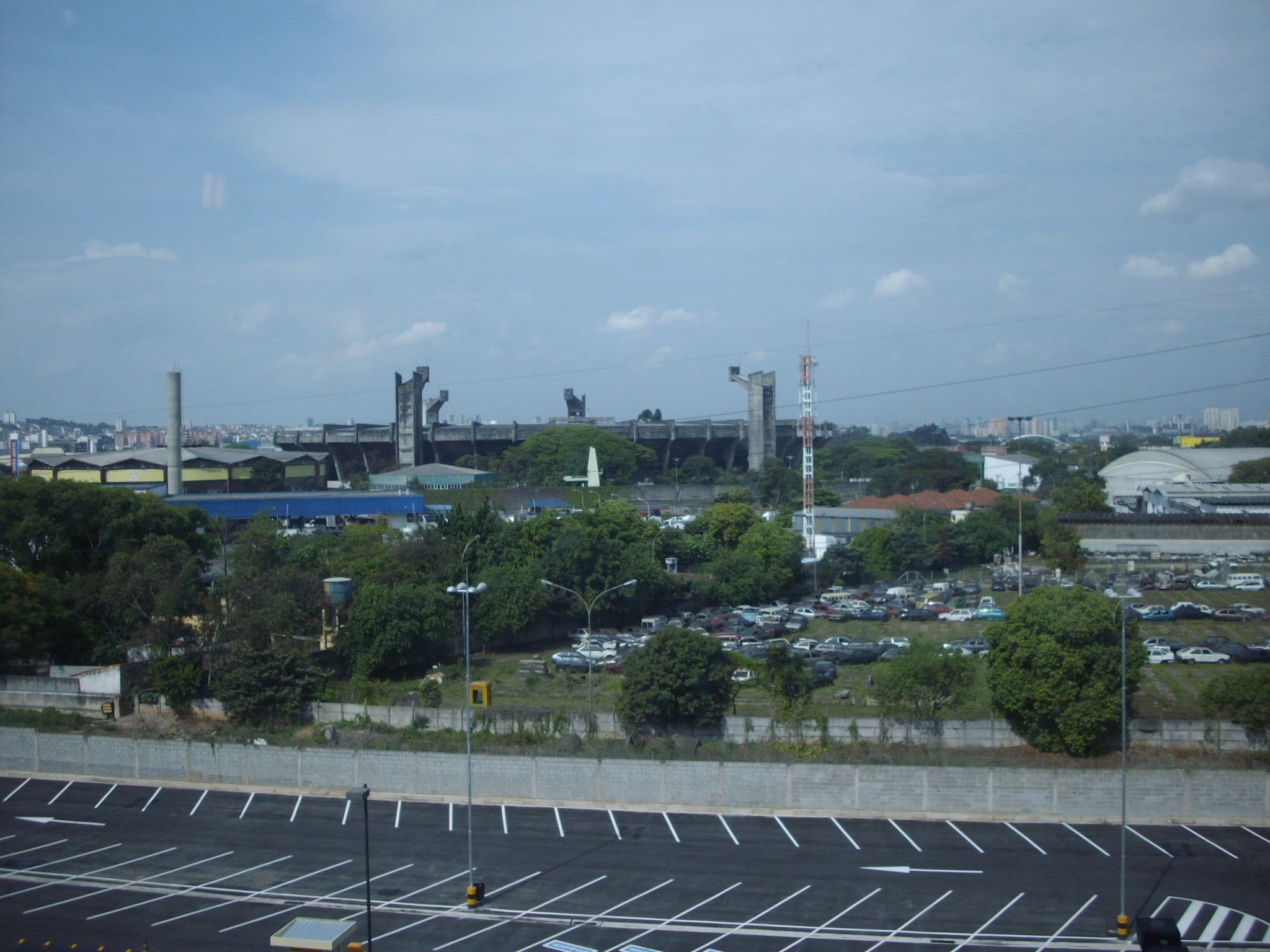
view of Ginásio da Portuguesa

Ginásio da Portuguesa is an arena in São Paulo, Brazil.

The Ultimate Fighting Championship held the UFC Brazil event here on October 16, 1998. The attendance was 8,500.

Events and tenants
Preceded by Mobile Civic Center	Ultimate Fighting Championship venue UFC Brazil	Succeeded by Pontchartrain Center
