= Townsend Saunders =

American wrestler (born 1966)

Personal information
- Born: April 20, 1967 (age 59) White Sands, New Mexico, U.S.
- Home town: Torrance, California, U.S.

Sport
- Country: United States
- Sport: Wrestling
- Events: Freestyle and Folkstyle
- College team: Arizona State; Cal State Bakersfield
- Club: Sunkist Kids Wrestling Club
- Team: USA
- Coached by: Bobby Douglas
Medal record
Men's freestyle wrestling
Representing the United States
Olympic Games
Silver medal – second place	1996 Atlanta	68 kg
Pan American Games
Gold medal – first place	1991 Havana	68 kg
Gold medal – first place	1995 Mar del Plata	68 kg
Goodwill Games
Gold medal – first place	1994 Saint Petersburg	68 kg
Collegiate Wrestling
Representing the Arizona State Sun Devils
NCAA Division I Championships
Silver medal – second place	1989 Oklahoma City	142 lb
Bronze medal – third place	1990 College Park	150 lb
Representing the Cal State Bakersfield Roadrunners
NCAA Division II Championships
Gold medal – first place	1987 Edwardsville	142 lb

Townsend Saunders (born April 20, 1967) is an Olympic silver medalist in freestyle wrestling. Collegiately, Saunders was a two-time NCAA Division I All-American at Arizona State University and an NCAA Division II National Champion for California State University-Bakersfield. Townsend was also a Goodwill Games gold medalist in 1994 and won two Pan American Games gold medals in 1991 and 1995.

== Biography ==
Saunders was born in White Sands, New Mexico. Known in college as "Junior" Saunders, he adopted his given name in international competition. In 1985, he was a California State runner-up while wrestling for Torrance High School in Torrance, California. Townsend Saunders has also competed in mixed martial arts for the Ultimate Fighting Championship, at UFC 16 and UFC 18.

Saunders is married to Tricia Saunders, a four-time FILA World Champion in women's freestyle wrestling, and is the father of three children.

In 2019, Saunders was inducted into the National Wrestling Hall of Fame as a Distinguished Member.

== Mixed martial arts record ==
Professional record breakdown
2 matches	0 wins	2 losses
By decision	0	2

Res.	Record	Opponent	Method	Event	Date	Round	Time	Location	Notes
Loss	0–2	Mikey Burnett	Decision (unanimous)	UFC 18	January 8, 1999	1	15:00	Kenner, Louisiana, United States	
Loss	0–1	Pat Miletich	Decision (split)	UFC 16	March 13, 1998	1	15:00	Kenner, Louisiana, United States	MMA Debut.

== Submission grappling record ==
Result	Opponent	Method	Event	Date	Round	Time	Notes
Win	(Brazil) Andre Pederneiras	Decision	The Contenders	1997	5	5:00	
