= Tsuyoshi Kosaka =

Japanese professional wrestler and mixed martial artist (born 1970)

Tsuyoshi Kohsaka 高阪剛
- Born: March 6, 1970 (age 56); Shiga, Japan
- Other names: TK, Kakutogi Kai no Kenja ("The Sage of the Combat Sports World")
- Height: 5 ft 11 in (180 cm)
- Weight: 214 lb (97 kg; 15 st 4 lb)
- Division: Heavyweight
- Style: Judo, Shoot Wrestling, Kickboxing
- Fighting out of: Tokyo, Japan
- Team: Rings Japan; Team Alliance; Alliance Square
- Teacher: Akira Maeda
- Rank: 4th dan black belt in Judo
- Years active: 1994–2006; 2015–2022

Mixed martial arts record
- Total: 53
- Wins: 30
- By knockout: 10
- By submission: 12
- By decision: 9
- Unknown: 2
- Losses: 21
- By knockout: 10
- By submission: 4
- By decision: 7
- Draws: 2

Other information
- Website: Official blog
- Mixed martial arts record from Sherdog
- Last updated on: March 19, 2011

Tsuyoshi Kosaka (Japanese: 高阪 剛, Kōsaka Tsuyoshi; born March 6, 1970) is a retired Japanese mixed martial artist, submission grappler and professional wrestler who competed in the Heavyweight division. A professional MMA competitor from 1994 till 2022, he has competed for the UFC, PRIDE Fighting Championships, RIZIN, RINGS, Pancrase, and DEEP. Kosaka is the former King of Pancrase Super Heavyweight Champion.

Kosaka is considered to be one of the early pioneers of mixed martial arts and was one of the top ranked Japanese fighters for several years. Known for his grappling skills, Kosaka is trained in Judo and Shoot Wrestling, His "TK guard" position, a precursor to modern butterfly guard, is famous for its efficiency; former UFC champions Frank Shamrock and Maurice Smith have both credited him with having vastly improved their grappling from that particular position.

== Background ==
Training in judo since highschool, Kosaka competed extensively during his stay at the Senshu University, where he befriended future world judo champion Hidehiko Yoshida. After graduating, Kosaka became a professional judoka under the sponsorship of Toray Industries, but was forced to retire after a knee injury. After a year, he joined shoot-style promotion Fighting Network RINGS where he began training in catch wrestling under mentor Akira Maeda.

== Mixed martial arts career ==
=== Fighting Network RINGS ===
Kosaka had his first mixed martial arts venture when, thanks to his strong judo background, he was sent to represent RINGS in the gi-clad MMA event Lumax Cup 1995. He won the tournament by knocking out Hiroyuki Yoshioka, submitting Susumu Yamasaki with a heel hook, and finally outclassing Brazilian jiu-jitsu champion Egan Inoue at the finals with a mix of judo throws and positional reversals.

After his return to RINGS, Kosaka was put in opening shoot matches, defeating names like Maurice Smith and Willie Peeters. In September 26, 1997, however, he was thrown to a greater challenge when he faced former Pancrase star Frank Shamrock. Tsuyoshi controlled the match, throwing and taking down the lighter Shamrock and threatening him with submissions, but couldn't lock any of them, while Shamrock was successful at defending from half guard and counterattacking with his own hold attempts. After a failed takedown, the judoka was caught in a guillotine choke by Frank and had to spend a rope escape. Even although Kohsaka later clamped a Kimura lock which appeared to carry potential to finish the match, the time ended without Kosaka completing the hold, thus giving the win to Shamrock for his scored point. The loss, however, was instrumental in Kohsaka's career, as it made him close friends with Frank Shamrock and Maurice Smith, who became his training partners in the team The Alliance shortly after.

In April 1999, after a series of matches in UFC, Kohsaka fought Dutch kickboxer Gilbert Yvel in RINGS. The match saw a worn Kosaka getting ahead in points by multiple fouls from Yvel, but he failed at submitting him while Yvel landed several knockdowns, until one of them caused the fight to be stopped. They rematched in August, when an improved Kohsaka immediately threw Yvel down, hit him with numerous body punches and submitted him with a toehold for a rope escape; however, the bout was interrupted for Kohsaka falling out the ring in another hip throw, getting injured. As TK had scored a point before the bout went to no contest, the match was counted as a victory for him. Finally, Yvel and Kohsaka had a rubber match during the King of Kings Tournament, but it was short and uneventful, as TK was stopped again by a bleeding cut.

In August 2000, TK faced the King of Kings semi-finalist Antônio Rodrigo Nogueira. Started the fight, Kohsaka blocked a takedown and transitioned it into an uchi mata, but Nogueira pulled him to the ground and mount him. The judoka escaped from under him, only for Nogueira to regain position, but this time it was Kohsaka who reversed him into a leglock attempt and pressed into his guard when it failed. At the next round, Kohsaka stopped another takedown with a leg hook tawara gaeshi and continued pressing, blocking Nogueira's attempts to work submissions from the bottom and striking when possible. Nogueira mounted him again and threw punches, but Kohsaka performed again his signature escape into leglock and keep attacking his guard. A pair of sweeps later, Kohsaka controlled position until the end of the time. The match was ruled a draw.

During the next King of Kings tournament, Kosaka advanced over Mikhail Ilyukhin by knockout and Mikhail's teammate Fedor Emelianenko by doctor stoppage. The latter was again a controversial technical victory, as the cut was caused by a missed looping punch where Kosaka's elbow struck Emelianenko's head, reopening a cut sustained in his previous fight against Ricardo Arona. Since the fight was in a tournament format, a winner and loser were required because draws and no-contests were not awarded, and as Emelianenko could not advance due to the injury, Kosaka did.

At the finals, TK faced Randy Couture in a back and forth match. Kosaka controlled the first round of a match fought mostly in the clinch, throwing down the wrestling champion with a harai makikomi and landing abundant ground and pound, but his activity stopped when he received an accidental headbutt. After the injury was checked, Couture took Kosaka down, and although the judoka used his "TK scissors" move to counter an unfavourable north/south position, the American still controlled the second round. The match ended with a trade of strikes in which Couture got the best part, being granted the split decision and eliminating the Japanese.

In June 2001, Kosaka fought luta livre specialist Renato Sobral, who had defeated Kosaka's countrymen Kiyoshi Tamura and Hiromitsu Kanehara. Sobral controlled the stand-up segments via wrestling and knee strikes, while Kosaka worked from the bottom and pursued submissions. Action increased at the second round, where Kohsaka and Sobral exchanged positions and reversals, but the Brazilian kept the dominance and it forced Kosaka to resort to sacrifice techniques like kani basami and flying kneebars. Victory by majority decision was given to Sobral.

After a quick KO victory over RINGS Russia exponent Koba Tkeshelashvili in August, Kosaka fought Koba's teammate Bazigit Atajev in December 2001 in what would be his last fight in RINGS. The judoka dominated the earlier segments of the match, taking down Atajev and exerting both ground and pound and armlocks attempts, but the Russian changed the tide of the match thanks to his superior stand-up, which drew blood from TK. At the end, Atajev won a majority decision.

=== Ultimate Fighting Championship ===
In 1998, Kosaka signed with the Ultimate Fighting Championship and debuted at the event UFC 16, facing Kimo Leopoldo. The much heavier Kimo controlled the first minutes of the fight and managed to lock a kneebar, but the Japanese shooter showed his field of expertise by reversing the hold and attempting his own ankle hold, always keeping a strong active defense. At one point, Leopoldo gained the mount, only for Kosaka to reverse the position into a heel hook attempt. As the match progressed, TK started to control an increasingly tired Kimo, landing precise punches and leg kicks until the end of the round. Came the overtime, TK further dominated Leopoldo, stopping his offense and performing ground and pound until the end, capturing the win by unanimous decision.

Later that year TK fought Pete Williams at UFC Brazil. Williams went aggressively against Kosaka using his vaunted striking, but Kosaka repeatedly threw him down with uchi mata and transitioned them into armlock attempts, using his defensive guard whenever Williams managed to get back the upper hand. At the end, Tsuyoshi won again by unanimous decision, which gained him a spot in a tournament for the title that was vacated by Randy Couture.

At 1999's UFC 18, Kosaka returned to UFC fighting the legendary Bas Rutten in the first round of the "Road to the Heavyweight Title", which was a four-man tournament that would crown the next UFC Heavyweight Champion. Kohsaka dominated most of the fight with his superiority in wrestling and ground and pound, but ultimately lost by TKO when Rutten recovered in overtime and knocked him out with knees and punches. The fight was a source of heated controversy because referee John McCarthy seemed to unfairly stand the fight up when Kohsaka was mounted on Rutten and actively landing clean effective punches. This ordeal would be noted by Jake Rossen of Black Belt magazine, who wrote: "Overall, the event demonstrated an impatience for lengthy ground battles. Fighters were stood up after just a few minutes of grappling, in an apparent effort to maintain action in the matches. [...] This puts strikers, once the underdog of MMA competition, in a prime position to climb to the top."

In the same year, TK faced Tim Lajcik at UFC 21, where he won via TKO when Lajcik quit between rounds. Kohsaka again utilized a strategy of strong defense and skilled reversals to set up submissions attempts, eventually sweeping Lajcik against the cage wall and performing a lengthy ground and pound sequence which made Tim's corner throw the towel after the round.

Despite carrying injuries from his grueling year schedule, Kosaka also took part in the second UFC event in Japanese soil, UFC 23, where he was pitted against Ruas Vale Tudo exponent Pedro Rizzo. The two contenders spent a round cautiously, until Rizzo switched to aggressive leg kicks and Kohsaka tried to take him down in return. Through the match, Pedro blocked TK's efforts to get it to the ground and landed more punches and leg kicks. After Kohsaka had absorbed a long punishment, Rizzo landed a right punch for the TKO.

Tsuyoshi's last fight in UFC was at UFC 37, fighting Ricco Rodriguez. The fight featured long, back and forth grappling action, with Rodriguez taking dominant position and Kosaka reversing and blocking him, until Ricco finally secured a mount and threw punches to the face for the TKO victory.

=== PRIDE Fighting Championships ===
After RINGS's demise, Kosaka wandered between Pancrase and the MMA division of New Japan Pro-Wrestling. He then landed in PRIDE Fighting Championships, in which his first fight would be a rematch against Fedor Emelianenko for the latter's technical defeat in RINGS, taking place in PRIDE Bushido 6. The fight was one-sided and brutal, with Fedor landing strikes through Kosaka's guard while the Japanese tried unsuccessfully to counterattack with leglocks from the bottom. At the end, after taking punches during most of the round, a bloody Kosaka's corner threw the towel between rounds.

Kosaka returned in PRIDE 31 against legendary Brazilian grappler and Brazilian Top Team coach Mario Sperry. The bout was even shorter, as Kosaka knocked him out with punches after a brief struggle. Knowing the end of his career was near, TK announced his intentions to retire should he lose any of his matches in 2006. The day of his fight with Sperry was also the same day of his son's birth.

At PRIDE Total Elimination Absolute, Kosaka fought Mark Hunt in what would be his last fight. Due to the weight difference between both fighters, knees and kicks were not allowed on the ground. Effectively, TK struggled with the much heavier kickboxer, taking his back and performing an inverted triangle/keylock combination only for Hunt to force his way out via raw strength. Back to standing, Kosaka traded strikes with Hunt and landed effective hits despite the difference in level, absorbing heavy punches and delivering in return combos against the ropes. At the second round, the Japanese again tried unsuccessfully to grapple with Hunt, and after long series of strikes the kickboxer knocked him out with a right punch, finally ending the match.

=== Post-PRIDE ===
From 2003 to 2005, he worked sporadically in professional wrestling for New Japan Pro-Wrestling, challenging Yoshihiro Takayama for the NWF Heavyweight Championship and feuding with Yuji Nagata. He also would defeat the 50 ib heavier Ricardo Morais in a MMA match for NJPW.

He also fought for Deep, facing Antônio Rogério Nogueira, Antônio Rodrigo's brother. Kosaka scored takedowns and throws, but he found himself on the defensor role, which he successfully played by using his classic reversals. On the third round, he was outstruck and received punches on the ground, but he retaliated at the final time with a toehold attempt from inverted guard, and ended the bout taking down Nogueira. The bout went to decision, with Nogueira coming over.

KosaKa would go to Pancrase, defeating the similarly much heavier Ron Waterman for the Pancrase Super Heavyweight Championship. He returned to the company for a match against Mike Kyle, losing by doctor decision in a controversial fashion, as Kyle eye-gouged Kosaka and actually damaged his cornea without being penalized.

=== RIZIN Fighting Federation ===
Rizin Fighting Federation announced Kosaka would debut for the promotion against James Thompson. The bout took place on December 29, 2015 and Kohsaka won the fight via TKO in the second round after controlling the fight with punches and knees. Kohsaka's next fight will be against Sumo Baruto Kaito December 29, 2016 as part of Rizin's Openweight tournament.

Kosaka faced Mirko Cro Cop on December 31 at RIZIN World Grand Prix 2017: Final Round. He lost the fight via TKO early in the first round.

Kosaka faced the Kyokushin Karate World Champion Mikio Ueda on April 17, 2022 at Rizin 35. Kosaka announced that this bout will be his last and he will retire afterwards. He won the fight by a first-round stoppage.

== Fighting style ==
As a fighter, Kosaka was known for his conditioning, well rounded skillset and grappling ability. He would predominantly use his Judo expertise in the ring, in the form of effective hip throws while standing and a heavy top control while on the ground, but he also showed his Shootfighting influence through various types of Leglocks and effective single and double-leg takedowns. He was especially proficient in reversing position, distinguishing himself with his trademark "TK scissors" sweep, in which he would use his legs to dismount the opponent and perform leglock attempts. Along with his grappling, Kohsaka made use of an intelligent striking game to wear down his adversary, and he later gained significant punching power after training with Maurice Smith.

There is debate about what kind of technique is the "TK guard" Kosaka was once known for. The move is, according to different sources, a half guard, a butterfly guard, or an entire system of guard game.

== Personal life ==
Kosaka is married and has two children, a son and a daughter. He now owns and operates a dojo in Japan where he trains his A-Square team. In 2012, Kosaka received an honorary Brazilian jiu-jitsu black belt from Yuki Nakai and was appointed a consultant member for the Japanese BJJ Federation. He later registered his own grappling system, named TK Jiu Jitsu.

== Championships and accomplishments ==
- Ultimate Fighting Championship
  - UFC Encyclopedia Awards
    - Fight of the Night (One time) vs. Bas Rutten
- Fighting Network RINGS
  - 2000 Rising Stars Heavyweight Tournament Semifinalist
- Lumax Cup
  - Tournament of J'95 Winner
- Pancrase Hybrid Wrestling
  - Pancrase Super Heavyweight Championship (One time, first, last)

== Mixed martial arts record ==
Professional record breakdown
53 matches	30 wins	21 losses
By knockout	10	10
By submission	12	4
By decision	9	7
Unknown	2	0
Draws	2	

Res.	Record	Opponent	Method	Event	Date	Round	Time	Location	Notes
Win	30–21–2	Mikio Ueda	KO (punches)	Rizin 35	April 17, 2022	1	2:05	Chōfu, Japan	
Loss	29–21–2	Saša Milinković	TKO (doctor stoppage)	HEAT 46	January 19, 2020	1	3:23	Tokyo, Japan	
Loss	29–20–2	Mirko Cro Cop	TKO (corner stoppage)	RIZIN World Grand-Prix 2017: Final Round	December 31, 2017	1	1:02	Saitama, Japan	
Loss	29–19–2	Baruto Kaito	Decision (unanimous)	Rizin World Grand Prix 2016: 2nd Round	December 29, 2016	2	5:00	Saitama, Japan	2016 Rizin Openweight Grand Prix Quarterfinal.
Win	29–18–2	James Thompson	TKO (punches)	Rizin World Grand Prix 2015: Part 1 - Saraba	December 29, 2015	2	1:58	Saitama, Japan	
Loss	28–18–2	Mark Hunt	TKO (punch)	PRIDE FC: Total Elimination Absolute	May 5, 2006	2	4:15	Osaka, Japan	PRIDE 2006 Openweight Grand Prix opening round.
Win	28–17–2	Mario Sperry	KO (punches)	PRIDE 31	February 26, 2006	1	1:20	Saitama, Japan	
Loss	27–17–2	Mike Kyle	Technical Decision (unanimous)	Pancrase: Spiral 8	October 2, 2005	3	1:17	Yokohama, Japan	
Win	27–16–2	David Shvelidze	Submission (armbar)	RINGS Russia: CIS vs. The World	August 20, 2005	1	N/A	Yekaterinburg, Russia	
Loss	26–16–2	Fedor Emelianenko	TKO (doctor stoppage)	PRIDE Bushido 6	April 3, 2005	1	10:00	Yokohama, Japan	
Win	26–15–2	Ron Waterman	Decision (unanimous)	Pancrase: Brave 10	November 7, 2004	3	5:00	Urayasu, Japan	Won the inaugural Pancrase Super Heavyweight Championship.
Win	25–15–2	Ricardo Morais	Decision (unanimous)	NJPW Ultimate Crush II	October 13, 2003	3	5:00	Tokyo, Japan	
Win	24–15–2	Dolgorsürengiin Sumyaabazar	TKO (doctor stoppage)	NJPW Ultimate Crush	May 2, 2003	1	2:56	Tokyo, Japan	
Loss	23–15–2	Antônio Rogério Nogueira	Decision (unanimous)	DEEP: 6th Impact	September 7, 2002	3	5:00	Tokyo, Japan	
Loss	23–14–2	Ricco Rodriguez	TKO (punches)	UFC 37	May 10, 2002	2	3:25	Bossier City, Louisiana, United States	
Loss	23–13–2	Bazigit Atajev	Decision (majority)	RINGS: World Title Series 5	December 21, 2001	3	5:00	Yokohama, Japan	
Win	23–12–2	Koba Tkeshelashvili	KO (knee)	RINGS: 10th Anniversary	August 11, 2001	1	2:17	Tokyo, Japan	
Loss	22–12–2	Renato Sobral	Decision (majority)	RINGS: World Title Series 2	June 15, 2001	3	5:00	Yokohama, Japan	
Loss	22–11–2	Randy Couture	Decision (split)	RINGS: King of Kings 2000 Final	February 24, 2001	2	5:00	Tokyo, Japan	King of Kings 2000 Tournament Quarterfinal.
Win	22–10–2	Fedor Emelianenko	TKO (doctor stoppage)	RINGS: King of Kings 2000 Block B	December 22, 2000	1	0:17	Osaka, Japan	King of Kings 2000 Tournament second round. Kohsaka cut Emelianenko with an illegal elbow, which led to doctor stoppage.
Win	21–10–2	Mikhail Ilyukhin	KO (punches)	RINGS: King of Kings 2000 Block B	December 22, 2000	2	01:53	Osaka, Japan	King of Kings 2000 Tournament first round.
Draw	20–10–2	Antônio Rodrigo Nogueira	Draw	RINGS: Millennium Combine 3	August 23, 2000	2	5:00	Osaka, Japan	
Win	20–10–1	Greg Wikan	Submission (toe hold)	RINGS USA: Rising Stars Block A	July 15, 2000	1	02:53	Orem, Utah, United States	Rising Stars Heavyweight Tournament 2000 second round. Later pulls out due to injury.
Win	19–10–1	Travis Fulton	Decision (unanimous)	RINGS USA: Rising Stars Block A	July 15, 2000	3	05:00	Orem, Utah, United States	Rising Stars Heavyweight Tournament 2000 first round.
Loss	18–10–1	Gilbert Yvel	TKO (doctor stoppage)	RINGS: King of Kings 1999 Block B	December 22, 1999	3	05:00	Osaka, Japan	
Win	18–9–1	Chris Haseman	Decision (split)	RINGS: King of Kings 1999 Block B	December 22, 1999	1	01:17	Osaka, Japan	
Loss	17–9–1	Pedro Rizzo	TKO (punches)	UFC 23	November 19, 1999	3	1:12	Urayasu, Japan	
Win	17–8–1	Gilbert Yvel	Technical Decision (points)	RINGS: Rise 5th	August 19, 1999	1	08:17	Japan	
Win	16–8–1	Tim Lajcik	TKO (corner stoppage)	UFC 21	July 16, 1999	2	05:00	Cedar Rapids, Iowa, United States	
Loss	15–8–1	Yoshihisa Yamamoto	TKO (palm strikes)	RINGS: Rise 3rd	May 22, 1999	3	00:44	Japan	
Loss	15–7–1	Gilbert Yvel	TKO (doctor stoppage)	RINGS: Rise 2nd	April 23, 1999	1	14:58	Japan	
Loss	15–6–1	Bas Rutten	TKO (punches)	UFC 18	January 8, 1999	1	14:15	Kenner, Louisiana, United States	Road to the Heavyweight Title Tournament Semifinal.
Win	15–5–1	Pete Williams	Decision	UFC Brazil	October 16, 1998	1	15:00	São Paulo, Brazil	Qualifies for the Road to the Heavyweight Title Tournament.
Draw	14–5–1	Kiyoshi Tamura	Draw	RINGS: Fourth Fighting Integration	June 27, 1998	1	30:00	Tokyo, Japan	
Win	14–5	Volk Han	Submission (injury)	RINGS: Third Fighting Integration	May 29, 1998	1	10:10	Tokyo, Japan	
Win	13–5	Kimo Leopoldo	Decision (unanimous)	UFC 16	March 13, 1998	1	15:00	Kenner, Louisiana, United States	
Win	12–5	Rob van Esdonk	Submission (heel hook)	RINGS Holland: The King of Rings	February 8, 1998	2	0:57	Amsterdam, Netherlands	
Loss	11–5	Mikhail Ilyukhin	Submission	RINGS: Battle Dimensions Tournament 1997 Final	January 21, 1998	N/A	N/A		
Win	11–4	Jerry Askoff	N/A	RINGS: Battle Dimensions Tournament 1997 Opening Round	October 25, 1997	N/A	N/A	United States	
Win	10–4	Borislav Jeliazkov	Decision (points)	RINGS: Mega Battle Tournament 1997 Semifinal 1	October 25, 1997	1	N/A	Japan	
Loss	9–4	Frank Shamrock	Decision (unanimous)	RINGS: Extension Fighting 7	September 26, 1997	1	30:00	Japan	
Loss	9–3	Kiyoshi Tamura	Submission (toe hold)	RINGS: Extension Fighting 2	April 22, 1997	1	13:57	Japan	
Win	9–2	Mikhail Ilyukhin	Submission	RINGS: Budokan Hall 1997	January 22, 1997	N/A	N/A	Tokyo, Japan	
Loss	8–2	Volk Han	Submission (armbar)	RINGS: Battle Dimensions Tournament 1996 Final	January 1, 1997	1	13:52		
Win	8–1	Dick Vrij	N/A	RINGS: Battle Dimensions Tournament 1996 Opening Round	October 25, 1996	N/A	N/A		
Loss	7–1	Volk Han	Submission (armbar)	RINGS: Maelstrom 6	August 24, 1996	1	13:52	Japan	
Win	7–0	Scott Sollivan	Submission (arm-triangle choke)	Various Fights	June 6, 1996	1	2:58	United States	
Win	6–0	Willie Peeters	Submission (rear-naked choke)	RINGS Holland: Kings of Martial Arts	February 18, 1996	N/A	N/A	Amsterdam, Netherlands	
Win	5–0	Maurice Smith	Submission (heel hook)	RINGS: Budokan Hall 1996	January 24, 1996	1	4:13	Tokyo, Japan	
Win	4–0	Egan Inoue	Decision (unanimous)	Lumax Cup: Tournament of J '95	October 13, 1995	1	3:40	Japan	Won the Lumax Cup Tournament of J '95.
Win	2–0	Susumu Yamasaki	Submission (heel hook)	Lumax Cup: Tournament of J '95	October 13, 1995	1	0:52	Japan	Tournament of J '95 Semifinal.
Win	2–0	Hiroyuki Yoshioka	TKO (punches)	Lumax Cup: Tournament of J '95	October 13, 1995	3	3:00	Japan	Tournament of J '95 First Round.
Win	1–0	Wataru Sakata	Submission	RINGS: Budokan Hall 1995	January 25, 1995	N/A	N/A	Tokyo, Japan	

== Submission grappling record ==
KO PUNCHES

Result	Opponent	Method	Event	Date	Round	Time	Notes
Draw	(Japan) Shutaro Debana	Draw	Quintet Fight Night 2	February 3, 2019	1	10:00	
Loss	(Brazil) Fabrício Werdum	Points	ADCC 2003 +99 kg	2003	1	N/A	
Win	(Japan) Caol Uno and (Japan) Osami Shibuya	Submission	The Contenders X-Rage Vol.2	March 10, 2002	1	14:39	Partnered with (Japan) Minoru Suzuki
Loss	(Brazil) Jean-Jacques Machado	Submission (armbar)	ADCC 2001 Absolute	2001	1	3:37	
Loss	(Brazil) Rolles Gracie	Points	ADCC 2001 –99 kg	2001	1	N/A	
Loss	(United States) Tom Erikson	Decision	The Contenders	1997	5	5:00	
