= Pontchartrain Center =

Arena in Louisiana, United States

Coordinates: 30°2′21″N 90°14′23″W

The Pontchartrain Center
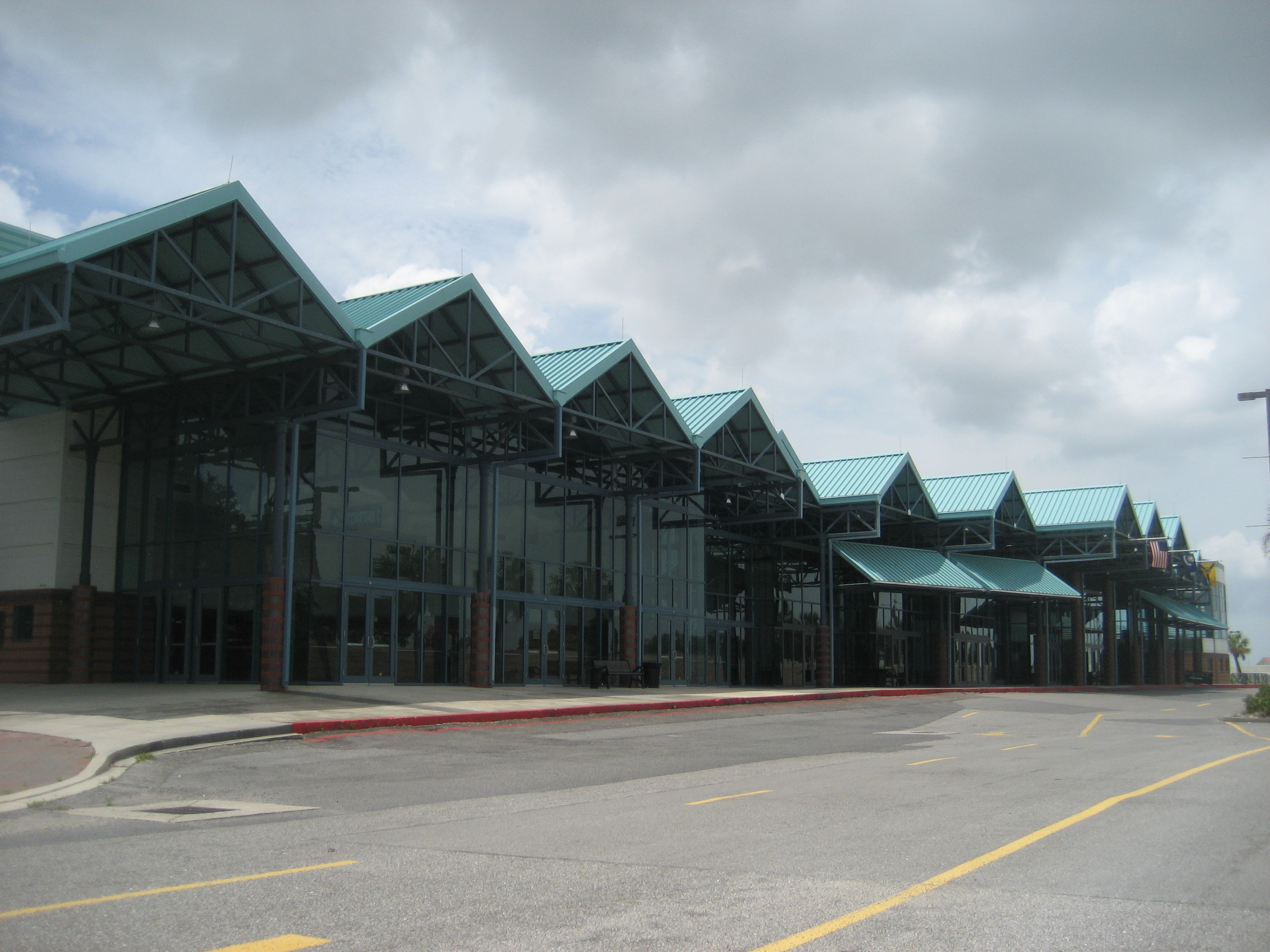
- Interactive map of The Pontchartrain Center
- Location: 4545 Williams Boulevard (Laketown); Kenner, LA 70065; United States
- Owner: City of Kenner
- Operator: ASM Global
- Capacity: Sporting events: 3,600; Concert: 3,700; Graduations: 3,585; Conventions: 3,228

Construction
- Opened: 1991

Tenants
- Laketown Squadron (NBA G League) (2026–present)

Website
- www.pontchartraincenter.com

The Pontchartrain Center is a 4,600-seat multi-purpose arena in Kenner, Louisiana, United States. The facility opened in 1991. It hosts concerts and local sporting events.

It is also used for conventions and trade shows, with 46,080 square feet (4,281 m^{2}) of exhibit space and 14,681 square feet (1,364 m^{2}) of meeting rooms.

On March 30, 2026, the New Orleans Pelicans announced that they would move their NBA G League affiliate, the Squadron, from Birmingham, Alabama to the Pontchartrain Center starting in the 2026–27 G League season.

Seating capacities:

- Sporting events: 3,600
- Concerts: 3,700
- Graduations: 3,585
- Conventions: 3,228

List of notable events

- The Ultimate Fighting Championship's
  - UFC 16: Battle in the Bayou
  - UFC 18: Road to the Heavyweight Title
- Matt Riddle's Bloodsport

== See also ==
- List of convention centers in the United States
- List of music venues

Events and tenants
Preceded by Yokohama Arena; Ginásio da Portuguesa	Ultimate Fighting Championship venue UFC 16; UFC 18	Succeeded by Mobile Civic Center; Casino Magic Bay St. Louis
