= UFC Brazil =

UFC mixed martial arts event in 1998

UFC Brazil: Ultimate Brazil
- The poster for UFC Brazil: Ultimate Brazil
- Promotion: Ultimate Fighting Championship
- Date: October 16, 1998
- Venue: Ginásio da Portuguesa
- City: São Paulo, Brazil

Event chronology
UFC 17: Redemption	UFC Brazil: Ultimate Brazil	UFC 18: The Road To The Heavyweight Title

UFC Brazil: Ultimate Brazil (also known as UFC Ultimate Brazil or UFC 17.5) was a mixed martial arts event held by the Ultimate Fighting Championship in São Paulo, Brazil on October 16, 1998. The event was seen on pay-per-view in the United States and Brazil, and was later released on home video.

== History ==
Ultimate Brazil was the first appearance of the UFC in Brazil, and the second UFC event to take place outside the US. The event was arranged through the initiative of Sérgio Batarelli, former Kickboxing and Vale Tudo fighter, promoter of the International Vale Tudo Championship, WVC (World Vale Tudo Championship) and manager of multiple Brazilian MMA fighters. Ultimate Brazil marked the first UFC event (other than UFC 9) to not utilize the tournament format which, aside from UFC 23, was abandoned completely in following events. The event featured the first ever UFC Welterweight Championship fight, as well as a Middleweight Championship fight.

Ultimate Brazil was part one of what the UFC called "The Road To The Heavyweight Title" (not to be confused with the event of the same name), a tournament of sorts, spanning four events, to crown the new UFC Heavyweight Champion following Randy Couture's relinquishing of the belt.

UFC Brazil marked the first appearance of Pedro Rizzo, who would go on to become a top UFC heavyweight contender. The event also featured the first UFC appearance of future PRIDE Middleweight Champion Wanderlei Silva in a fight against former UFC 12 heavyweight tournament champion and future UFC Light Heavyweight Champion Vitor Belfort. Belfort became the first person to knock Silva out, with an impressive 44 second knockout after a barrage of punches.

== Results ==
Main Card
Weight class				Method	Round	Time	Notes
Middleweight	Frank Shamrock (c)	def.	John Lober	TKO (submission to punches)		7:40	(Note: For the UFC Light Heavyweight Championship.)
Welterweight	Pat Miletich	def.	Mikey Burnett	Decision (split)		21:00	(Note: For the inaugural UFC Welterweight Championship.)
Middleweight	Vitor Belfort	def.	Wanderlei Silva	TKO (punches)		0:44
Heavyweight	Pedro Rizzo	def.	Tank Abbott	KO (punch)		8:07
Heavyweight	Tsuyoshi Kosaka	def.	Pete Williams	Decision (unanimous)		15:00
Middleweight	Ebenezer Fontes Braga	def.	Jeremy Horn	Submission (guillotine choke)		3:27
Alternate Bouts
Lightweight	Cesar Marscucci	def.	Paulo Santos	TKO		10:27
Middleweight	Tulio Palhares	def.	Adriano Santos	TKO		9:00

== Encyclopedia awards ==
The following fighters were honored in the October 2011 book titled UFC Encyclopedia.

- Fight of the Night: Frank Shamrock vs. John Lober
- Knockout of the Night: Vitor Belfort
- Submission of the Night: Ebenezer Fontes Braga

== See also ==
- Ultimate Fighting Championship
- List of UFC champions
- List of UFC events
- 1998 in UFC
