= Ebenezer Fontes Braga =

Brazilian mixed martial arts fighter

- Born: April 14, 1969 (age 57); Rio de Janeiro, Brazil
- Other names: Pitbull
- Height: 6 ft 0 in (1.83 m)
- Weight: 199 lb (90 kg; 14.2 st)
- Division: Light Heavyweight
- Style: Kickboxing, Luta Livre
- Team: Boxe Thai; Academia Budokan Luta Livre; Gracie Barra Combat Team
- Rank: Black belt in Luta Livre
- Years active: 1995-2004

Mixed martial arts record
- Total: 22
- Wins: 13
- By knockout: 5
- By submission: 3
- By decision: 2
- Unknown: 3
- Losses: 7
- By knockout: 3
- By submission: 2
- By decision: 2
- Draws: 2

Other information
- Mixed martial arts record from Sherdog

Ebenezer Fontes Braga (born April 14, 1969) is a retired Brazilian mixed martial artist, kickboxer, Muay Thai and luta livre practitioner. He competed in the light heavyweight division.

== Mixed martial arts career ==
Braga started his career at "Circuito de Lutas 3" in 1995. After defeating Agrinaldo Ralei, he lost to Jorge Pereira. He took part in "Brazilian Vale Tudo Fighting 1" in 1996, winning twice in the same day. Later that year he fought at "Freestyle de Belem 1" and won three fights in the same day. He was defeated by Kevin Randleman and Dan Severn in 1997. After defeating Branden Lee Hinkle, he made his UFC debut and defeated Jeremy Horn at UFC Brazil. In 1999, he lost to Kazushi Sakuraba by armbar at his debut in Pride 6. He lost his next fight to Akira Shoji by decision at PRIDE Grand Prix 2000 Opening Round, then defeated Daijiro Matsui at PRIDE 15. He lost his last fight at JF 2 - Jungle Fight 2 against Fabrício Werdum on May 15, 2004.

== Kickboxing career ==
Braga took part in the K-1 Grand Prix in 2001. After defeating Kenji Kusatsu in a quarterfinal, he lost to Jerome LeBanner in a semifinal. Later that year he fought to a draw with Akio Mori. On October 8, 2001, he was scheduled to fight against Cyril Abidi at the "K-1 World GP 2001 in Fukuoka", but he was forced to withdraw due to poor physical condition. On June 2, 2002, he was scheduled to fight Nicholas Pettas at "K-1 Survival 2002", but was forced to withdraw due to a nasal bone fracture.

== Personal life ==
Braga moved to the USA in 2014 and became pastor the same year.

== Career accomplishments ==
=== Mixed martial arts ===
- Ultimate Fighting Championship
  - UFC Encyclopedia Awards
    - Submission of the Night (One time) vs. Jeremy Horn

== Mixed martial arts record ==
Professional record breakdown
22 matches	13 wins	7 losses
By knockout	5	3
By submission	3	2
By decision	2	2
Unknown	3	0
Draws	2	

Res.	Record	Opponent	Method	Event	Date	Round	Time	Location	Notes
Loss	13–7–2	Fabrício Werdum	KO (punch)	Jungle Fight 2	May 15, 2004	2	1:28	Manaus, Brazil	
Win	13–6–2	Erik Wanderley	Decision	Heat FC 2: Evolution	December 18, 2003	3	5:00	Natal, Brazil	
Win	12–6–2	Rodrigo Gripp de Sousa	Technical Submission (guillotine choke)	Jungle Fight 1	September 13, 2003	1	0:33	Manaus, Brazil	
Loss	11–6–2	Forrest Griffin	Submission (rear-naked choke)	Heat FC 1: Genesis	July 31, 2003	1	N/A	Natal, Brazil	
Draw	11–5–2	Gary Goodridge	Draw	Inoki Bom-Ba-Ye 2001	December 31, 2001	5	3:00	Saitama, Japan	K-1 vs. Pride rules match
Win	11–5–1	Daijiro Matsui	Decision	PRIDE 15	July 29, 2001	3	5:00	Saitama, Japan	
Loss	10–5–1	Akira Shoji	Decision	PRIDE Grand Prix 2000 Opening Round	January 30, 2000	1	15:00	Tokyo, Japan	
Loss	10–4–1	Kazushi Sakuraba	Submission (armbar)	Pride 6	July 4, 1999	1	9:23	Yokohama, Japan	
Draw	10–3–1	Masakatsu Funaki	Draw	Pancrase - Breakthrough 4	April 18, 1999	1	15:00	Yokohama, Japan	
Win	10–3	Jeremy Horn	Submission (standing guillotine choke)	UFC Brazil	October 16, 1998	1	3:27	São Paulo, Brazil	
Win	9–3	Branden Lee Hinkle	Submission (triangle choke)	IVC 6: The Challenge	August 23, 1998	1	12:33	Brazil	
Loss	8–3	Dan Severn	TKO (doctor stoppage)	IVC 1: Real Fight Tournament	July 6, 1997	1	8:17	Brazil	
Loss	8–2	Kevin Randleman	Decision	Universal Vale Tudo Fighting 6	March 3, 1997	1	20:00	Brazil	
Win	8–1	Rei Zulu	N/A	Freestyle de Belem 1	July 1, 1996	N/A	N/A	Belém, Brazil	
Win	7–1	Silvio Vieira	N/A	Freestyle de Belem 1	July 1, 1996	N/A	N/A	Belém, Brazil	
Win	6–1	Francisco Nonato	N/A	Freestyle de Belem 1	July 1, 1996	N/A	N/A	Belém, Brazil	
Win	5–1	Fernando Cerchiari	TKO (doctor stoppage)	Brazilian Vale Tudo Fighting 1	May 31, 1996	1	4:06	Brazil	
Win	4–1	Carlos Alberto Regis	TKO (submission to strikes)	Brazilian Vale Tudo Fighting 1	May 31, 1996	1	2:20	Brazil	
Win	3–1	Naohisa Kawamura	KO (punches)	Universal Vale Tudo Fighting 1	April 5, 1996	1	3:17	Japan	
Win	2–1	Drago Drago	TKO (submission to strikes)	Gaisei Challenge Vale Tudo 2	October 8, 1995	1	1:03	Brazil	
Loss	1–1	Jorge Pereira	TKO (strikes)	Circuito de Lutas 3	September 12, 1995	1	11:18	Brazil	
Win	1–0	Agrinaldo Ralei	TKO (submission to strikes)	Circuito de Lutas 3	September 12, 1995	1	1:24	Brazil	

== Kickboxing record (incomplete) ==
Professional kickboxing record
? wins, ? loss, ? draw
Date	Result	Opponent	Event	Location	Method	Round	Time	Record
2001-6-24	Draw	Akio Mori	K-1: Survival 2001	Sendai, Japan	Decision (Majority)	3	5:00	1-1-1
2001-04-29	Loss	Jerome LeBanner	K-1: Osaka 2001	Osaka, Japan	Ko (Punch)	1	1:31	1-1
2001-04-29	Win	Kenji Kusatsu	K-1: Osaka 2001	Osaka, Japan	Ko (Punch)	2	1:20	1-0
