= Pancrase =

MMA promotion based in Japan

Pancrase Inc.
- Native name: パンクラス
- Romanized name: Pankurasu
- Type: Private
- Industry: Mixed martial arts promotion
- Predecessor: Pro Wrestling Fujiwara Gumi; World Pancrase Create Inc.
- Founded: 1993; 33 years ago
- Founders: Masakatsu Funaki; Minoru Suzuki; Ken Shamrock
- Headquarters: Tokyo, Japan
- Key people: Hidetaka Fukui (chief chairman)
- Owner: Pancrase Executive Committee
- Website: pancrase.co.jp

Pancrase (パンクラス, Pankurasu) is a Japanese mixed martial arts (MMA) promotion company based in Tokyo. It was founded in 1993 by professional wrestlers Masakatsu Funaki and Minoru Suzuki. It is one of the oldest continuously operating MMA promotions in the world and played an important role in the development of modern mixed martial arts in Japan. The promotion grew out of the Japanese shoot wrestling scene, combining catch wrestling-derived grappling with striking and a competitive format inspired in part by professional wrestling.

The name was based on pankration, a fighting sport in the Ancient Olympic Games. Suzuki and Funaki conceived Pancrase as a shoot wrestling promotion with genuine combat, instead of predetermined matches, while retaining elements of the professional wrestling tradition. Its early events featured distinctive rules that differed from those of most modern MMA: closed-fist punches were prohibited to the head but permitted to the body, while open-handed strikes to the head were allowed. Fighters competed in a professional wrestling-style ring with three ropes, and could also escape a submission by reaching the ropes, although doing so cost a point; exceeding a specified number of rope breaks, normally between three and five, resulted in disqualification. Fighters competed without gloves, in close-fitting trunks and professional wrestling-style knee-high boots. Suzuki and Funaki coined the term "Hybrid Wrestling" for this new combat sport. The term "Shootfighting" was also used at the time to describe this type of legitimate hybrid combat; Ken Shamrock, Pancrase's first champion, for example, represented "Shootfighting" at UFC 1 in 1993. Pancrase's champions are known as "Kings of Pancrase".

The first event held was Pancrase: Yes, We Are Hybrid Wrestlers at Tokyo Bay NK Hall in September 1993. The promotion subsequently became an important proving ground for Japanese and international fighters and helped establish MMA as a distinct competitive sport in Japan. Ever since, Pancrase has held over 400 events featuring "hybrid wrestling" and mixed martial arts competition. Currently, Pancrase operates as a developmental circuit for Japanese fighters.

During the late 1990s, adapting to a rapidly changing MMA landscape, Pancrase gradually revised its rules to more closely resemble those used by other MMA organizations, in particular PRIDE Fighting Championships. By 2014, Pancrase had fully adopted the Unified Rules of Mixed Martial Arts, used by the UFC. However, it still calls itself "Hybrid Wrestling" rather than MMA, preserving its traditions and origins in Japanese shoot wrestling.

== History ==
=== Establishment and first event ===
The Japanese professional wrestling scene of the 1970s and 1980s placed a greater emphasis on realistic combat than its American counterpart, particularly through Antonio Inoki and New Japan Pro-Wrestling (NJPW). Influenced in part by catch wrestling practitioner Karl Gotch, Inoki promoted a style that incorporated legitimate combat techniques and sought to blur the distinction between professional wrestling and real fighting. These ideas were further developed by the Universal Wrestling Federation (UWF), founded by former NJPW wrestler Akira Maeda in 1984, which became known as "Shoot-style wrestling" or "shoot wrestling". Following the UWF's dissolution in 1990, several of its wrestlers continued to develop the style through other promotions, including Yoshiaki Fujiwara's Pro Wrestling Fujiwara Gumi, from which Pancrase emerged in 1993.

In 1993, Masakatsu Funaki, Minoru Suzuki, Ken Shamrock, Takaku Fuke, and others from the shoot-style Fujiwara Gumi wrestling promotion left the company, due to (mentor and promoter) Yoshiaki Fujiwara's decision to cooperate with the likes of Universal Lucha Libre and W*ING and favoring showmanship over in-ring work. While shoot wrestling was more realistic than other forms of professional wrestling, promoters at the time generally believed that genuinely competitive matches would be difficult to sell to audiences. Earlier in 1992, a rare legitimate match was booked where Ken Shamrock (fighting as Wayne Shamrock) faced international kickboxing champion Don Nakaya Nielsen. Shamrock took Nielsen down immediately and submitted him with an arm lock in 45 seconds. Previously, Funaki and Suzuki also had experimented in a real, unscripted shoot match, which was well-received. The success of these matches made young pro wrestlers Shamrock, Funaki and Suzuki question the prevailing belief that real matches were not commercially viable. Encouraged by Karl Gotch, former pro wrestling star, important catch-as-catch-can coach who advocated for professional wrestling to be a legitimate and genuine combat sport, they brought together a group of pro wrestlers that were interested in developing a promotion centered on legitimate competition, with limited gimmicks and no predetermined outcomes. Gotch also suggested name "Pancrase" from Pankration, the Ancient Greek Olympic sport which mixed grappling with striking.

On May 16, 1993, they established World Pancrase Create Inc. (WPC) with the capital of 30,000,000 Japanese yen.

On September 21, 1993, Pancrase promoted their first event, Pancrase: Yes, We Are Hybrid Wrestlers at Tokyo Bay NK Hall. All the matches were finished with knockout and submission and it attracted a sellout crowd of 7,000 fans. While the public was unfamiliar with what to expect from the new form of fighting, the event received widespread praise from both the fans and media. The event's five matches had a combined duration of only 13 minutes and 5 seconds, contrasting with the longer, slower-paced matches common in other shoot-style wrestling promotions, which often used prolonged positional exchanges to maintain the audience's interest. The unusually short bouts were nickamed byōsatsu (秒殺, "instant kill", literally "killing in seconds") by Japanese wrestling press and fans to describe Pancrase's rapid finishes. Besides Funaki, Suzuki, Shamrock and Fuke, the inaugural event also featured future King of Pancrase and UFC Hall of Famer Bas Rutten, as well as future UFC competitors and Pancrase veterans Vernon White and Kazuo Takahashi among its participants.

=== Early era ===
The first King Of Pancrase Openweight champion was Ken Shamrock (later becoming famous for his exploits in the Ultimate Fighting Championship), who had previous experience in the newborn UWF and Fujiwara Gumi. Over the years, Funaki and Suzuki held the title alongside other big names, such as Bas Rutten, Frank Shamrock and Guy Mezger.

While founded with the objectives of having real, unscripted combats. On its early era, some match were reportedly worked or otherwise arranged in advance. The promotion did this to protect its performers from potentially damaging losses or injuries, to control the outcomes and maintain the status of its principal stars, and to preserve planned matchups and rivalries while the promotion gradually transitioned from professional wrestling to legitimate competition. Scott Bessac, one of the promotion's early fighters, recalled that Pancrase featured both "works" and "shoots", and "works where the other guy didn't even know it was a work", while Ken Shamrock also recalled that fighters sometimes reached prior agreements concerning how their bouts would be conducted, including arrangements intended to prevent inexperienced opponents from being seriously injured. According to him, his fights against Maurice Smith and Matt Hume were among those worked, as both were relatively inexperienced compared with Shamrock, who agreed with them beforehand to avoid seriously injuring them while still doing a competive or semi-competitive exhibition. The Ken Shamrock–Minoru Suzuki fight is probably the best-known alleged example of a worked Pancrase bout. According to Jeremy Wall, Pancrase asked Shamrock to surrender the King of Pancrase title to Suzuki in a worked fight because the promotion did not want its champion to risk losing the title or damaging Pancrase's standing shortly before Shamrock was scheduled to face Dan Severn at UFC 6. Pancrase participant Guy Mezger said that "there was [sic] not very many works [predetermined outcomes]. Maybe 4 or 5 total and most of them were before I was fighting for them. I hate when people say that there was [sic] so many works in Pancrase, they truly do not know what they are talking about". On the other hand, UFC co-founder Art Davie recalled that, while developing the concept that became the UFC, he studied Pancrase and other Japanese shoot-style promotions, and was convinced that Pancrase was "80 percent work and 20 percent shoot", describing it as a more sophisticated form of American professional wrestling that nevertheless featured legitimate "shooters" such as Masakatsu Funaki.

Early on, the "Hybrid Wrestling" ruleset had no rule barring strikes when groundfighting although an informal gentlemen's agreement discouraged fighters from striking grounded opponents, and ground exchanges therefore consisted primarily of grappling. This convention was challenged during Frank Shamrock's bout against Allan Goes in 1995 at Pancrase: Eyes Of Beast 4, when Goes struck Shamrock from the mount in a form of ground-and-pound, exploiting the discrepancy between the written rules and the fighters' customary practices. This informal agreement would gradually give way to more permissive rulesets and a broader acceptance of ground striking as part of competition.

On its early 90s heyday Pancrase attracted large audiences, with several major events drawing crowds of more than 10,000 spectators. In May 1994, Pancrase: Road to Championship 1 at the Nippon Budokan in Tokyo drew 16,000 attendees. The two-night sixteen-men King of Pancrase tournament at the Ryōgoku Sumo Hall in December of that year was one of the largest and most notable mixed martial arts events of its era, one of the first major international MMA tournaments outside the UFC and featuring many of the sport's leading fighters, including future UFC champions Bas Rutten, Ken Shamrock, Frank Shamrock and Maurice Smith, alongside prominent Japanese fighters such as Masakatsu Funaki, Minoru Suzuki and Manabu Yamada. The tournament drew approximately drew approximately 11,000 spectators on its first night and 11,500 spectators on its second night respectively. Ken Shamrock was crowned the first "King of Pancrase" after defeating Alex Cook, Smith, Funaki and Yamada in sequence.

The Semaphore Entertainment Group (SEG), at the time the owners of Ultimate Fighting Championship (UFC), purchased the rights to Pancrase shows and ran them on pay-per-view (PPV) to coincide with their UFC events at the time.

=== Transition to modern MMA ===
The promotion's relatively technical style was increasingly contrasted with the more aggressive styles associated with the UFC and the newly established Pride Fighting Championships. Many of its fighters were also leaving the organization or retiring. In an attempt to adapt to the changing MMA landscape, in 1998 Pancrase experimented with matches held under more permissive vale tudo rules, which it referred to as "Pankration rules" matches. These experiments preceded a more extensive revision of Pancrase's rules the following year.

In 1999, Pancrase eventually revised its rules to more closely resemble those of other mixed martial arts promotions. The new rules permitted closed-fist strikes to the head, bringing Pancrase closer to the emerging modern MMA ruleset. The promotion also introduced a more conventional judging system and standardized shorter bouts, while retaining the prohibition on knees to the head of a grounded opponent. Fighters now had to use open-fingered gloves, a new boxing-style ring was adopted and the attire was changed to fighting shorts. The changes were intended to make Pancrase more accessible to fighters from other MMA organizations and to reduce the differences between its rules and those used by promotions such as Pride Fighting Championships. The revised rules were introduced during the 1999 Breakthrough series, marking the end of Pancrase's distinctive early ruleset.

The introduction of the new ruleset was also followed by changes to Pancrase's weight-class system. Rather than immediately adopting the standardized weight divisions used by most major MMA promotions, Pancrase initially maintained four divisions: openweight, heavyweight, light heavyweight, and middleweight. In January 2002, the promotion expanded its official system from four weight classes to seven, consisting of heavyweight, light heavyweight, middleweight, welterweight, lightweight, and featherweight, in addition, the openweight title was briefly restored in 2003 and held by Josh Barnett, who defended it twice before the title was retired.

The rule changes represented an attempt to adapt Pancrase's style to the increasingly competitive MMA landscape. By this time, many of the stars who had established the promotion during its early years had either retired, affected by years of intensive training and frequent competition, or departed for the UFC and Pride. With much of its established talent having moved on, Pancrase increasingly shifted from an international destination for established fighters to a promotion focused on developing up-and-coming talent and serving as a stepping stone to larger MMA organizations.

After accumulating numerous injuries, Funaki retired from Pancrase in September 1999, returning for a last match against Rickson Gracie at Colosseum 2000 event at the Tokyo Dome on May 26, 2000, losing by submission and subsequently retiring from mixed martial arts. Minoru Suzuki left Pancrase in 2003 and retired from Mixed Martial Arts, as he returned to regular professional wrestling as a freelancer.

=== Partnerships and international expansion ===
In 2005, Pancrase entered into a promotional partnership with Sega Sammy Holdings to promote the video game Shadow the Hedgehog. As part of the promotion, Pancrase events held during the 2005 SPIRAL TOUR featured Shadow the Hedgehog branding on the ring and promotional materials, while a Shadow the Hedgehog mascot appeared at events and participated in presentations. Sega executives Yuji Naka and Takashi Iizuka also attended one of the events, where Naka explained that Pancrase's black, red, and white visual identity complemented Shadow's character design. The collaboration was part of Sega's broader marketing campaign for Shadow the Hedgehog, which was released in Japan in December 2005.

Pancrase Korea is the South Korean subsidiary of the Pancrase Inc. and held several events from 2007 to 2010. The first Pancrase Korea event was an amateur one held on March 10, 2007, in Busan and the last one was the semi-professional Neo-Blood Tournament 2 & Hybrid Challenge 12 held on September 12, 2010, in Seoul.

=== Changes in management ===
In May 2008, "Pancrase Inc." was established as a new management company for Pancrase, and WPC alienated Pancrase Inc. their all of business as on May 27, 2008. When Pancrase Inc. was established, Yasushi Sakamoto, a managing director of WPC, was installed as the executive president.

On October 14, 2008, Pancrase Inc. moved its office to Nishi Ikebukuro in the ward of Toshima in Tokyo.

In September 2009, Pancrase Inc. moved its office from Nishi Ikebukuro to Aobadai in ward of Meguro in Tokyo, and moved again to Kameido in the ward of Koto.

On October 1, 2010, Ryo Kawamura, who was the current mixed martial artist was installed as the executive president. Yasushi Sakamoto, the former president, had become a managing director.

Kawamura held a press conference in Yokohama, Kanagawa, on October 22, and explained about restructuring and announced that "Commission Council" had been established as a third party .

On June 1, 2012, Pancrase announced that the promotion had been sold to Masakazu Sakai and his Smash organization, with Sakai taking over as the new president and his partner Yuji Shimada as the event producer of the promotion. As part of the reconstruction of Pancrase, the new owners intend to replace rings with cages, holding events to test the new format in 2013.

Pancrase 257 on March 30, 2014, was the last event where Pancrase used a ring, and by Pancrase 258 on May 11, 2014, Pancrase adopted the decagon or the ten-sided cage of their American partners World Series of Fighting.

=== Organizational change ===
On March 9, 2022, the Smash Martial Arts Department Pancrase Business Headquarters will be reorganized and operated as the "Pancrase Executive Committee".

In addition, the King of Pancrase Executive Committee will also be reorganized and operated as the "King of Pancrase Council".

== Rules ==
=== Original rules ===
Originally, Pancrase ran events with rules derived from shoot-style professional wrestling, which Pancrase referred to as "hybrid wrestling." Fighters fought without gloves in a professional wrestling-style ring and wore wrestling trunks and wrestling boots. The rules combined submission grappling with limited striking and incorporated elements from shoot wrestling such as rope escapes and point deductions.

Aside from the traditional grappling rules (e.g., no biting, no eye-gouging) the rules were formerly as follows:

- No elbows to the head (neither while standing nor on the ground).
- No closed-fist strikes to the head (neither while standing nor on the ground).
- No knees to the head on the ground.
- No kicks/stomps to the head on the ground.
- If a participant gets too close to the ropes, he is stood back up on the feet. (as opposed to PRIDE's re-centering in the middle of the ring)
- Non-title matches consist of one 15 minute round, while title matches consist of one 30 minute round.
- If a participant is caught in a submission and taps out (whether unable to reach the ropes or not), it is a loss.
- Five "escapes" are given to each fighter at the start of every match. An escape can be used when caught in a submission near the ropes, in which case the participant can grab them, be stood back on the feet and have one point deducted. Once a participant has used all of his escapes, it is a loss.
- For knockouts, a ten-count similar to boxing and kickboxing is used. If the participant is unable to answer the ten-count, it is declared a TKO and that fighter has lost the match. However, if the participant is able to answer the ten-count, the fight resumes and one point is deducted.
- If, at the end of regulated time, neither fighter has submitted, been knocked out, or lost all their points, a decision is rendered based on who lost fewer points. If neither fighter lost any points, or both lost the same number of points, the fight is declared a draw.
- In the 1994 King of Pancrase tournament, the rules were slightly different, in that the first round had one 10-minute round and three rope escapes, and the finals had one 20-minute round with three rope escapes.
- For a short period of time when Bas Rutten was the King of Pancrase, heelhooks were banned because of the frequency of injuries.
- Strikes on the ground – whether closed fist to the body or open hand to the head – were discouraged by the fans, but still legal.

=== Present-day Japanese rules ===
After Pancrase: Breakthrough 1 held on January 19, 1999, Pancrase began to use a ruleset similar to that of Pride FC, referred as "Pankration rules", but prohibited knees to the head of grounded opponents.

In May 2016, Pancrase adopted the Association of Boxing Commissions and Combative Sports rules, better known as the Unified Rules of Mixed Martial Arts. The fighting arena was changed to a Mixed martial arts cage.

=== Weight classes ===
Weight class name	Weight limit		
Weight class name	Until 2008	Until 2016	Present
Atomweight	N/A	N/A	105 lb (47.6 kg)
Strawweight	N/A	50 kg (110.2 lb)	115 lb (52.2 kg)
Light Flyweight	N/A	54 kg (119 lb)	N/A
Flyweight	N/A	58 kg (127.9 lb)	125 lb (56.7 kg)
Bantamweight	N/A	62 kg (136.7 lb)	135 lb (61.2 kg)
Featherweight	65 kg (143.3 lb) (Note: Named as Lightweight from 2006 to 2008)	66 kg (145.5 lb)	145 lb (65.8 kg)
Lightweight	N/A	70 kg (154.3 lb)	155 lb (70.3 kg)
Welterweight	75 kg (165.3 lb) (Note: Named as Lightweight until 2006)	77 kg (169.8 lb)	170 lb (77.1 kg)
Middleweight	85 kg (187.4 lb)	84 kg (185.2 lb)	185 lb (83.9 kg)
Light Heavyweight	95 kg (209.4 lb)	93 kg (205 lb)	205 lb (93 kg)
Heavyweight	105 kg (231.5 lb)	120 kg (264.6 lb)	265 lb (120.2 kg)
Super Heavyweight	Unlimited	N/A	N/A
Openweight	No weight restrictions	N/A	N/A

== Current Pancrase champions (King and Queen of Pancrase) ==
The champions in Pancrase are known as "King of Pancrase". The current weight division system of Pancrase is based upon the Unified Rules of Mixed Martial Arts since December 4, 2007. At this time, Pancrase also announced establishment of Flyweight and Bantamweight, and abolition of Super heavyweight. On March 18, 2011, Pancrase restructured their weight classes adding several more lower weight classes. In addition, they introduced the Queen Of Pancrase title which will be used for women's fights in the future.

Men's division	Champion	Title Defenses
Heavyweight (120 kg (264.6 lb))	Vacant	
Light Heavyweight (93 kg (205 lb))		
Middleweight (84 kg (185.2 lb))	(Japan) Yura Naito	0
Welterweight (77 kg (169.8 lb))	(Japan) Ryuichiro Sumimura	0
Lightweight (70 kg (154.3 lb))	(Japan) Tatsuya Saika	0
Featherweight (66 kg (145.5 lb))	(Japan) Suguru Nii	0
Bantamweight (61 kg (134.5 lb))	(Japan) Tokitaka Nakanishi	0
Flyweight (57 kg (125.7 lb))	(Japan) Seiichiro Ito	1
Strawweight (52 kg (114.6 lb))	(Japan) Keito Yamakita	0
Women's Bantamweight (61 kg (134.5 lb))	Vacant	
Women's Flyweight (57 kg (125.7 lb))	(Japan) Fumika Watanabe	0
Women's Strawweight (52 kg (114.6 lb))	(Japan) Haruka Hasegawa	0
Women's Atomweight (47.6 kg (104.9 lb))	(Japan) Satomi Takano	0

=== Former Pancrase champions ===
- Ken Shamrock
- Masakatsu Funaki
- Bas Rutten
- Minoru Suzuki
- Sanae Kikuta
- Kiuma Kunioku
- Tsuyoshi Kosaka
- Frank Shamrock
- Yuki Kondo
- Nathan Marquardt
- Ricardo Almeida
- Josh Barnett
- Semmy Schilt
- Guy Mezger
- Katsuya Inoue
- Maximo Blanco
- Mitsuhisa Sunabe
- Izuru Takeuchi
- Syuri

== Notable alumni ==
- Bas Rutten
- Chael Sonnen
- Ken Shamrock
- Frank Shamrock
- Carlos Condit
- José Aldo
- Nate Diaz
- Josh Barnett
- Guy Mezger
- Minoru Suzuki
- Akihiro Gono
- Jason Delucia
- Genki Sudo
- Ikuhisa Minowa
- Evangelista Santos
- Ryushi Yanagisawa
- Manabu Yamada
- Yoshiki Takahashi
- Ryo Kawamura
- Riki Fukuda
- Paul Daley
- Satoru Kitaoka
- Masayuki Kono
- Syuri
- Daiki Hata
- Izuru Takeuchi
- Yukio Sakaguchi
- Joe Riggs
- Chris Lytle
- Kazuo Misaki
- Evan Tanner
- Maurice Smith

== See also ==
- List of Pancrase events
- Pankration, an ancient Greek martial art
- Shooto
