= Pat Miletich =

American mixed martial arts fighter

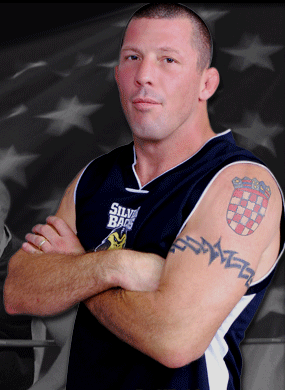
- Miletich in 2008
- Born: Patrick Jay Miletich; March 9, 1968 (age 58); Davenport, Iowa, U.S.
- Other names: The Croatian Sensation
- Height: 5 ft 10 in (178 cm)
- Weight: 169 lb (77 kg; 12.1 st)
- Division: Welterweight; Middleweight
- Fighting out of: Bettendorf, Iowa, U.S.
- Team: Miletich Fighting Systems
- Rank: Black belt in American Karate; Third degree black belt in Brazilian Jiu-Jitsu
- Years active: 1995–2002, 2006, 2008, 2023 (MMA); 1999 (Boxing); 2020 (Kickboxing)

Professional boxing record
- Total: 1
- Wins: 1

Kickboxing record
- Total: 1
- Losses: 1

Mixed martial arts record
- Total: 39
- Wins: 29
- By knockout: 7
- By submission: 16
- By decision: 6
- Losses: 8
- By knockout: 4
- By submission: 3
- By decision: 1
- Draws: 2

Other information
- Boxing record from BoxRec
- Mixed martial arts record from Sherdog

Patrick Jay Miletich (/ˈmɪlətɪtʃ/; born March 9, 1968) is a retired American mixed martial artist and former sports commentator. He is known for his fights in the Ultimate Fighting Championship, where he became the first UFC Welterweight Champion and UFC 16 Welterweight Tournament Winner. Miletich is also known as a highly successful trainer and coach, having founded Miletich Fighting Systems. This camp is considered one of the most successful in MMA history and has produced several world champions. On July 6, 2014, he was inducted into the UFC Hall of Fame.

== Early life ==
Miletich, the youngest of five children, was born in Davenport, Iowa, to second generation Croatian immigrant parents. Two of his brothers are deceased. Miletich started wrestling at the age of five, continuing at Bettendorf High School. Miletich also played high school football in Bettendorf Bulldogs and was an All-State nose guard in his senior year. Miletich shared the Bettendorf High School wrestling room with future MMA champion Mark Kerr. He said he wanted to be a world champion in something and wrestling was something he was good at. Although Miletich originally planned to pursue football after graduating high school, he eventually chose to wrestle in junior college. When his mother developed heart problems, he left school to care for her. Miletich has stated in past interviews that he actually began fighting to help pay her bills.

== Mixed martial arts career ==
=== Early career ===
Miletich started his MMA training at 26. Before this, Miletich trained at Tarpein's Dojo in, Davenport, IA with Grand Master Nick Tarpein, where he learned much of what he knows about karate, and was introduced to Brazilian Jiu-Jitsu for the very first time. With Miletich's wrestling background, Jiu-Jitsu came naturally to him. When Miletich coupled BJJ with his strong foundation in boxing/karate, he realized where his fighting career should go; MMA. After learning the foundations of BJJ in Tarpein's Dojo, Miletich decided to branch out and learn BJJ full-time. A friend from Chicago got him into a Renzo Gracie seminar.

After training in jiu-jitsu for a year, the same friend then got him into the Battle of the Masters, an MMA tournament held in Chicago in 1995. Miletich continued fighting at smaller events and enjoyed success. He was undefeated through 15 fights before losing to Matt Hume.

=== Ultimate Fighting Championship ===
Three fights later Miletich fought in UFC 16 and won the first UFC Welterweight tournament.

==== Welterweight champion ====
At UFC 17.5: Ultimate Brazil, Miletich defeated Mikey Burnett to become the first UFC Welterweight Champion. In his fifth title defense at UFC 31 he suffered his first UFC loss as he lost the championship to Carlos Newton by submission. According to Miletich, he had a rematch clause in his contract but it was bypassed by the organization as Miletich's camp already had multiple high-ranked fighters in the welterweight division.

His next fight was a KO win over Shonie Carter at UFC 32.

==== Move up to middleweight ====
After the fight with Carter, Miletich moved up to the Middleweight division. This was also partly due to encouragement by UFC management and because his teammate, Matt Hughes, defeated Carlos Newton to win the UFC Welterweight Championship. Miletich returned to fight at his new weight at UFC 36, but quickly lost to Matt Lindland. Miletich decided to take some time away from professional fighting and recover from numerous chronic injuries. Miletich was scheduled to fight Frank Trigg at WFA 3 but pulled out due to injury. He returned in September 2006 to fight Renzo Gracie in an IFL superfight, and submitted to a guillotine choke in the first round. Miletich spoke briefly after the fight about re-aggravating his old neck injury before the Gracie fight. Miletich's last fight was in December 2008 where he scored a second-round KO over Thomas Denny that was televised on the HDNet network.

Over a decade since his last mixed martial arts bout, Miletich was originally scheduled to face Michael Nunn in a kickboxing match on April 18, 2020. However, the bout was rescheduled to July 18, 2020, due to the COVID-19 pandemic. Miletich lost to Nunn via split decision.

=== Return ===
After a near fifteen year hiatus, Miletich returned to face rival Mike Jackson on October 14, 2023 at Caged Aggression 36. Despite finding initial success against his younger foe, Miletich succumbed to fatigue, and lost via technical knockout after his corner stopped the fight before the start of the third round.

== Coaching ==
Miletich founded Miletich Fighting Systems, a mixed martial arts academy in his hometown of Bettendorf, Iowa. MFS has trained over 90 televised fighters and 11 MMA world champions, including former two-time UFC Welterweight Champion and UFC Hall of Famer Matt Hughes, former two-time UFC Heavyweight Champion Tim Sylvia, former UFC Lightweight Champion Jens Pulver, and former EliteXC Middleweight Champion and former UFC Welterweight Champion Robbie Lawler.

=== Law enforcement/military training ===
For over 15 years Miletich has trained local, state, and federal law-enforcement officers and military groups from all service branches, including special-operations groups attached to those branches. He has also written and designed defensive tactics and combatives courses for other combatives companies.

Miletich is also the co-founder of Fire Horse combatives which trains LEO and military personnel.

Miletich was the primary subject matter of L. Jon Wertheim's "Blood in the Cage: Mixed Martial Arts, Pat Miletich, and the Furious Rise of the UFC", which detailed Miletich's biography and his fighting camp (Miletich Fighting Systems).

== Commentary ==
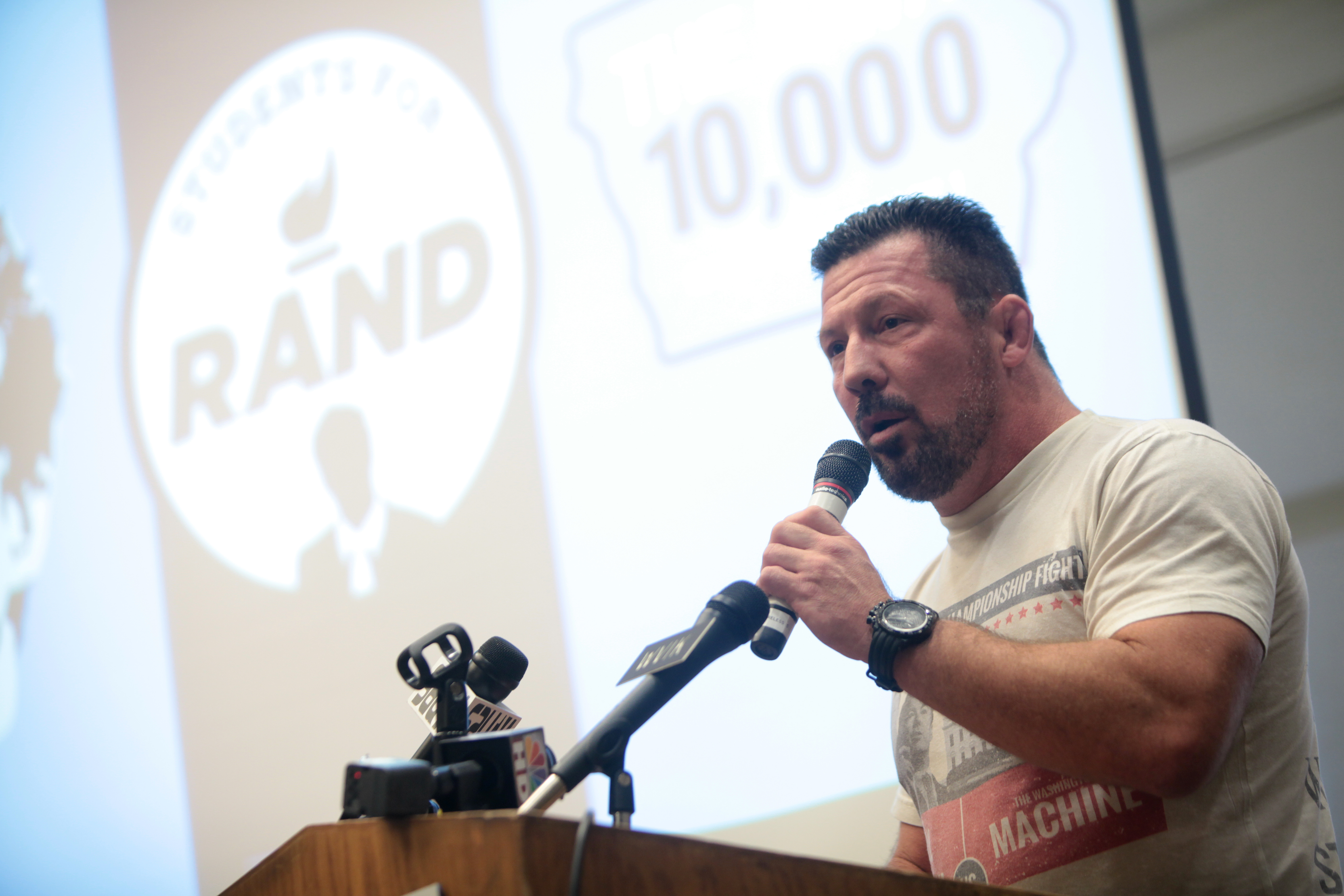
Miletich speaking at St. Ambrose University in Davenport, Iowa.

Miletich began providing color commentary for Strikeforce on April 11, 2009, for its debut on Showtime and did so regularly until that promotion's demise in 2012.

Miletich was color commentary for ESPN's MMA Live and Legacy Fighting Alliance on UFC Fight Pass. On January 12, 2021 Pat Miletich was fired from his commentary position at Legacy Fighting Alliance for being present in Washington D.C. at the 2021 storming of the United States Capitol, although he had no involvement.

== Personal life ==
Miletich is married and has three daughters. He is a Freemason.

Miletich was arrested on June 29, 2020, in Moline, Illinois and was charged with DUI. This was Miletich's second DUI arrest, his first coming in September 2018, a charge to which he pleaded guilty in March 2019.

== Championships and accomplishments ==
- Ultimate Fighting Championship
  - UFC Hall of Fame (Pioneer Wing, Class of 2014)
  - UFC Welterweight Championship (One time, first)
    - Four successful title defenses
  - UFC 16 Welterweight Tournament Winner
  - UFC Viewers Choice Award
  - UFC Encyclopedia Awards
    - Knockout of the Night (One time) vs. Shonie Carter
    - Submission of the Night (One time) vs. John Alessio
- Sherdog
  - Mixed Martial Arts Hall of Fame
- George Tragos/Lou Thesz Professional Wrestling Hall of Fame
  - George Tragos Award (2011)
- Resurrection Fighting Alliance & AXS TV
  - Lifetime Achievement Award

== Mixed martial arts record ==
Professional record breakdown
39 matches	29 wins	8 losses
By knockout	7	4
By submission	16	3
By decision	6	1
Draws	2	

Res.	Record	Opponent	Method	Event	Date	Round	Time	Location	Notes
Loss	29–8–2	Mike Jackson	TKO (retirement)	Caged Aggression 36	October 14, 2023	2	5:00	Davenport, Iowa, United States	
Win	29–7–2	Thomas Denny	KO (punches)	Adrenaline MMA 2	December 11, 2008	2	0:50	Moline, Illinois, United States	
Loss	28–7–2	Renzo Gracie	Submission (guillotine choke)	IFL 9	September 23, 2006	1	3:37	Moline, Illinois, United States	
Loss	28–6–2	Matt Lindland	TKO (punches)	UFC 36	March 22, 2002	1	3:09	Las Vegas, Nevada, United States	Middleweight bout.
Win	28–5–2	Shonie Carter	KO (head kick)	UFC 32	June 29, 2001	2	2:42	East Rutherford, New Jersey, United States	
Loss	27–5–2	Carlos Newton	Submission (bulldog choke)	UFC 31	May 4, 2001	3	2:50	Atlantic City, New Jersey, United States	Lost the UFC Welterweight Championship.
Win	27–4–2	Kenichi Yamamoto	Submission (guillotine choke)	UFC 29	December 16, 2000	2	1:58	Tokyo, Japan	Defended the UFC Welterweight Championship.
Loss	26–4–2	Kiyoshi Tamura	Decision (majority)	Rings: Millennium Combine 3	August 23, 2000	2	5:00	Yokohama, Japan	Catchweight (198.4 lb) bout.
Win	26–3–2	John Alessio	Submission (armbar)	UFC 26	June 9, 2000	2	1:43	Cedar Rapids, Iowa, United States	Defended the UFC Welterweight Championship.
Loss	25–3–2	José Landi-Jons	TKO (corner stoppage)	WEF 8 - Goin' Platinum	January 15, 2000	1	8:00	Rome, Georgia, United States	Catchweight (175 lb) bout.
Win	25–2–2	Shonie Carter	Decision (unanimous)	Extreme Challenge 27	August 21, 1999	1	20:00	Davenport, Iowa, United States	
Win	24–2–2	André Pederneiras	TKO (doctor stoppage)	UFC 21	July 16, 1999	2	2:20	Cedar Rapids, Iowa, United States	Defended the UFC Welterweight Championship.
Win	23–2–2	Clayton Miller	Submission (triangle choke)	Cage Combat 2	May 30, 1999	1	0:40	Ottumwa, Iowa, United States	
Loss	22–2–2	Jutaro Nakao	Technical Submission (triangle choke)	SuperBrawl 11	February 2, 1999	1	9:22	Honolulu, Hawaii, United States	Lightweight bout.
Win	22–1–2	Jorge Patino	Decision (unanimous)	UFC 18	January 8, 1999	1	21:00	New Orleans, Louisiana, United States	Defended the UFC Welterweight Championship.
Win	21–1–2	Mikey Burnett	Decision (split)	UFC Brazil	October 16, 1998	1	21:00	São Paulo, Brazil	Won the inaugural UFC Welterweight Championship.
Draw	20–1–2	Dan Severn	Draw	Extreme Challenge 20	August 22, 1998	1	20:00	Davenport, Iowa, United States	
Win	20–1–1	Al Buck, Jr.	Submission (choke)	Midwest Shootfighting 1	June 27, 1998	2	2:49	Clinton, Iowa, United States	
Win	19–1–1	Chris Brennan	Submission (shoulder choke)	UFC 16	March 13, 1998	1	9:02	New Orleans, Louisiana, United States	UFC 16 Welterweight Tournament Winner.
Win	18–1–1	Townsend Saunders	Decision (split)	UFC 16	March 13, 1998	1	15:00	New Orleans, Louisiana, United States	
Win	17–1–1	Chris Brennan	Decision (unanimous)	EC - Extreme Challenge Trials	November 15, 1997	1	10:00	Davenport, Iowa, United States	
Draw	16–1–1	Chris Brennan	Draw (majority)	Extreme Challenge 9	August 30, 1997	1	20:00	Davenport, Iowa, United States	
Win	16–1	Chuck Kim	Submission (rear-naked choke)	Extreme Challenge 7	June 25, 1997	1	10:46	Council Bluffs, Iowa, United States	
Loss	15–1	Matt Hume	TKO (doctor stoppage)	Extreme Fighting 4	March 28, 1997	1	5:00	Des Moines, Iowa, United States	Catchweight (179 lb) bout
Win	15–0	Chad Cox	TKO (submission to punch)	Extreme Challenge 3	February 15, 1997	1	1:48	Davenport, Iowa, United States	
Win	14–0	Paul Kimbro	Submission (armbar)	Extreme Challenge 2	February 1, 1997	1	5:13	Des Moines, Iowa, United States	
Win	13–0	Jason Nicholson	Decision (unanimous)	SuperBrawl 3	January 17, 1997	1	15:00	Honolulu, Hawaii, United States	
Win	12–0	Earl Loucks	Submission (americana)	Extreme Challenge 1	November 23, 1996	1	7:00	Des Moines, Iowa, United States	
Win	11–0	Pat Assalone	Submission (armbar)	Brawl at the Ballpark 1	September 1, 1996	1	4:01	Davenport, Iowa, United States	
Win	10–0	Matt Andersen	TKO (submission to punches)	Gladiators 1	July 26, 1996	1	5:21	Davenport, Iowa, United States	
Win	9–0	Yasunori Matsumoto	TKO (doctor stoppage)	QCU 2	May 11, 1996	1	15:53	Moline, Illinois, United States	
Win	8–0	Andrey Dudko	Submission (rear-naked choke)	BOTM 2	February 10, 1996	1	2:49	Illinois, United States	
Win	7–0	Bob Gholson	KO (punches)	BOTM 2	February 10, 1996	1	2:20	Illinois, United States	
Win	6–0	Rick Graveson	Submission (rear-naked choke)	BOTM 2	February 10, 1996	1	0:46	Illinois, United States	
Win	5–0	Rick Graveson	Submission (rear-naked choke)	QCU 1	January 20, 1996	1	1:53	Moline, Illinois, United States	
Win	4–0	Ed McLennan	Submission (armbar)	QCU 1	January 20, 1996	1	1:28	Moline, Illinois, United States	
Win	3–0	Kevin Marino	Submission (rear-naked choke)	BOTM 1	October 28, 1995	1	3:49	Chicago, Illinois, United States	
Win	2–0	Angelo Rivera	Submission (rear-naked choke)	BOTM 1	October 28, 1995	1	1:40	Chicago, Illinois, United States	
Win	1–0	Yasunori Matsumoto	Submission (rear-naked choke)	BOTM 1	October 28, 1995	1	7:40	Chicago, Illinois, United States	

== Professional boxing record ==
1 fight	1 win	0 losses
By decision	1	0

No.	Result	Record	Opponent	Method	Round, time	Date	Notes
1	Win	1–0	Donald Tucker	UD	4 (4),	Jan 20, 1999	

Preceded by Guy Mezger	UFC 16 Lightweight Tournament winner March 13, 1998	Succeeded by Dan Henderson
New championship	1st UFC Welterweight Champion; October 16, 1998 - May 4, 2001	Succeeded by Carlos Newton
