= Paul Buentello =

American mixed martial arts fighter

- Born: January 16, 1974 (age 52); Amarillo, Texas, United States
- Other names: The Headhunter
- Height: 6 ft 3 in (1.91 m)
- Weight: 205 lb (93 kg; 15 st)
- Division: Heavyweight; Light heavyweight
- Reach: 76.0 in (193 cm)
- Fighting out of: San Jose, California, United States
- Team: Grudge Training Center
- Years active: 1997–2017

Mixed martial arts record
- Total: 52
- Wins: 35
- By knockout: 25
- By submission: 6
- By decision: 4
- Losses: 17
- By knockout: 8
- By submission: 4
- By decision: 5

Other information
- Mixed martial arts record from Sherdog

Paul Anthony Buentello (born January 16, 1974) is an American former mixed martial artist. A professional competitor from 1997 to 2017, Buentello competed in the UFC, Bellator, Strikeforce, Affliction, King of the Cage, Shark Fights, ACB, Legacy FC, and is the former King of the Cage Heavyweight Champion.

== Background ==
Paul grew up in Tulia, Texas, and went to school with former UFC Middleweight Champion Evan Tanner. At Caprock High School, Buentello played baseball and football, and then began Tae Kwon Do after graduating. Buentello received the nickname "The Headhunter" due to his propensity, in his early years of martial arts training, to axe kick his opponent's faces.

== Mixed martial arts career ==
=== Ultimate Fighting Championship ===
In his debut in the UFC, he had an impressive win over Justin Eilers with a KO in 3:34 of the first round for his debut fight in UFC 51: Super Saturday on February 2, 2005. His next fight was against Kevin Jordan on UFC 53: Heavy Hitters on June 4, 2005 where Buentello won with a neck crank submission at 4:00 of the first round. He lost a title shot against the heavily touted #2 ranked Heavyweight fighter in the world Interim UFC Interim Heavyweight Champion Andrei Arlovski at UFC 55 on October 7, 2005, Arlovski knocked Buentello out in 15 seconds setting a UFC record for the quickest title fight in UFC history. Following his devastating loss to Arlovski, he faced off against Gilbert Aldana at UFC 57 where he won via TKO due to strikes.

=== Strikeforce ===
After leaving the UFC, Buentello fought for Strikeforce, winning 3 straight against K-1 Kickboxer Carter Williams, UFC veteran Tank Abbott, and experienced journeyman Ruben Villareal, before losing to Alistair Overeem in a bout for the Strikeforce Heavyweight Championship.

=== Affliction ===
Buentello moved to a new major organization, Affliction, where he won his first two bouts. His third fight was set to be against Gilbert Yvel at Affliction: Trilogy on August 1, 2009, but the entire event was ultimately cancelled due to complications arising from heavyweight Josh Barnett's inability to receive a California State Athletic Commission licence. Affliction Entertainment became defunct as an MMA promoter shortly after.

=== UFC return ===
At a press conference held July 31, 2009, it was announced that Buentello was one of several former Affliction fighters to sign with UFC.

Buentello was expected to face Todd Duffee at UFC 107, but Duffee was forced off the card with an undisclosed injury. Buentello instead faced 6'11 Stefan Struve and lost a majority decision.

Subsequently, Buentello lost to Cheick Kongo on UFC LIVE: Vera vs. Jones where he surprisingly—after a prolonged period of having his legs pounded—he tapped due to elbows to the right thigh in the third round. After losing both bouts in his return to the UFC, Buentello was released from the promotion.

=== Independent promotions ===
Buentello continued his MMA career at the Texas-based Shark Fights promotion, defeating the previously unbeaten (6-0) Bryan Humes via Unanimous Decision.

Buentello fought former UFC Heavyweight Champion Tim Sylvia at Powerhouse World Promotions: War on the Mainland on August 14. In a very one sided fight, Sylvia defeated Buentello via KO due to an uppercut in the second round.

Buentello was scheduled to face Kerry Schall at Nemesis Fighting: MMA Global Invasion on November 13, 2010 but the event was postponed to December 10, 2010 to avoid a tropical storm. He won the fight by unanimous decision. Buentello, like the other MMA fighters on the card, did not receive his contracted pay.

His next bout was a non-title fight against decorated amateur wrestler and current Bellator Heavyweight Champion Cole Konrad at Bellator 48 on August 20, 2011. He lost the bout via unanimous decision.

On March 31, 2012, Buentello faced former Shark Fights Heavyweight Champion, and The Ultimate Fighter 10 alumni Darrill Schoonover WMMA 1: McCorkle vs. Heden. Buentello lost by unanimous decision.

Buentello was scheduled to face Marcus Sursa at Legacy Fighting Championship 22 on August 23, 2013, however, the bout was scrapped after Sursa was denied a license by the Texas Department of Licensing and Registration. He instead faced James McSweeney at the event. He won the fight via TKO in the second round.

Buentello faced independent prospect Myron Dennis on March 15, 2014, at Legacy FC 29 for their vacant Light heavyweight championship. Buentello lost the back-and-forth fight by split decision.

Buentello fought Rameau Thierry Sokoudjou in the Heavyweight class on October 3, 2015 in Abu Dhabi, UAE at Abu Dhabi Warriors Fighting Championship 3. Buentello won the fight via KO with punches in the third round.

=== Absolute Championship Berkut ===
Buentello faced Denis Goltsov at ACB 41: Path to Triumph on July 15, 2016. He lost the fight via knockout in the first round.

== Championships and accomplishments ==
- Ultimate Fighting Championship
  - UFC Encyclopedia Awards
    - Submission of the Night (One time) vs. Kevin Jordan
  - UFC.com Awards
    - 2005: Ranked #10 Submission of the Year vs. Kevin Jordan
    - 2009: Ranked #5 Loss of the Year vs. Stefan Struve
- International Fighting Championship
  - IFC Warriors Challenge 7 Tournament Runner Up
- King of the Cage
  - KOTC Heavyweight Championship (One time)
  - One Successful Title Defense

== Mixed martial arts record ==
Professional record breakdown
| 52 matches | 35 wins | 17 losses |
| By knockout | 25 | 8 |
| By submission | 6 | 4 |
| By decision | 4 | 5 |

| Res. | Record | Opponent | Method | Event | Date | Round | Time | Location | Notes |
|---|---|---|---|---|---|---|---|---|---|
| Loss | 35–17 | Denis Goltsov | KO (head kick) | ACB 41: The Path to Triumph | July 15, 2016 | 1 | 3:07 | Sochi, Krasnodar krai, Russia | |
| Win | 35–16 | Eric Prindle | KO (punch) | Abu Dhabi Warriors 4 | May 24, 2016 | 1 | 1:04 | Abu Dhabi, United Arab Emirates | |
| Win | 34–16 | Rameau Thierry Sokoudjou | KO (punch) | Abu Dhabi Warriors 3 | October 3, 2015 | 3 | 3:12 | Abu Dhabi, United Arab Emirates | Return to Heavyweight. |
| Loss | 33–16 | Myron Dennis | Decision (split) | Legacy FC 29 | March 15, 2014 | 3 | 5:00 | Albuquerque, New Mexico, United States | For the Legacy FC Light Heavyweight Championship. |
| Win | 33–15 | James McSweeney | TKO (punches to the body) | Legacy FC 22 | August 23, 2013 | 2 | 2:44 | Lubbock, Texas, United States | Light heavyweight debut. |
| Win | 32–15 | Igor Kostin | Decision (unanimous) | Federation of MMA of Russia: Star Fight 15 | May 30, 2013 | 3 | 5:00 | Vladikavkaz, Russia | |
| Win | 31–15 | Mike Cook | KO (punch) | IFC: Warriors Challenge 29 | December 8, 2012 | 2 | 2:08 | Oroville, California, United States | |
| Win | 30–15 | Igor Kostin | KO (punches) | Vologda Fight Festival: Head Hunting | October 12, 2012 | 3 | 0:56 | Vologda, Russia | |
| Loss | 29–15 | Darrill Schoonover | Decision (unanimous) | WMMA 1: McCorkle vs. Heden | March 31, 2012 | 3 | 5:00 | El Paso, Texas, United States | |
| Loss | 29–14 | Cole Konrad | Decision (unanimous) | Bellator 48 | August 20, 2011 | 3 | 5:00 | Uncasville, Connecticut, United States | Non-title bout. |
| Win | 29–13 | Kerry Schall | Decision (unanimous) | Nemesis Fighting: MMA Global Invasion | December 10, 2010 | 3 | 5:00 | Punta Cana, Dominican Republic | |
| Loss | 28–13 | Tim Sylvia | KO (punch) | Powerhouse World Promotions: War on the Mainland | August 14, 2010 | 2 | 4:57 | Irvine, California, United States | For the PWP Heavyweight Championship. |
| Win | 28–12 | Bryan Humes | Decision (unanimous) | Shark Fights 11: Humes vs Buentello | May 22, 2010 | 3 | 5:00 | Odessa, Texas, United States | |
| Loss | 27–12 | Cheick Kongo | TKO (submission to elbows to the legs) | UFC Live: Vera vs. Jones | March 21, 2010 | 3 | 1:16 | Broomfield, Colorado, United States | |
| Loss | 27–11 | Stefan Struve | Decision (majority) | UFC 107 | December 12, 2009 | 3 | 5:00 | Memphis, Tennessee, United States | |
| Win | 27–10 | Kirill Sidelnikov | TKO (doctor stoppage) | Affliction: Day of Reckoning | January 24, 2009 | 3 | 4:18 | Anaheim, California, United States | |
| Win | 26–10 | Gary Goodridge | Decision (unanimous) | Affliction: Banned | July 19, 2008 | 3 | 5:00 | Anaheim, California, United States | |
| Loss | 25–10 | Alistair Overeem | TKO (submission to knee to the body) | Strikeforce: Four Men Enter, One Man Survives | November 16, 2007 | 2 | 3:42 | San Jose, California, United States | For the inaugural Strikeforce Heavyweight Championship. |
| Win | 25–9 | Carter Williams | TKO (punches) | Strikeforce: Shamrock vs. Baroni | June 22, 2007 | 2 | 0:10 | San Jose, California, United States | |
| Win | 24–9 | Ruben Villareal | TKO (corner stoppage) | Strikeforce: Triple Threat | December 8, 2006 | 2 | 3:57 | San Jose, California, United States | |
| Win | 23–9 | Tank Abbott | KO (punch) | Strikeforce: Tank vs. Buentello | October 7, 2006 | 1 | 0:43 | Fresno, California, United States | |
| Win | 22–9 | Gilbert Aldana | TKO (punches) | UFC 57 | February 4, 2006 | 2 | 2:27 | Las Vegas, Nevada, United States | |
| Loss | 21–9 | Andrei Arlovski | KO (punch) | UFC 55 | October 7, 2005 | 1 | 0:15 | Uncasville, Connecticut, United States | For the UFC Heavyweight Championship. |
| Win | 21–8 | Kevin Jordan | Submission (guillotine choke) | UFC 53 | June 4, 2005 | 1 | 4:00 | Atlantic City, New Jersey, United States | |
| Win | 20–8 | Justin Eilers | KO (punch) | UFC 51 | February 5, 2005 | 1 | 3:34 | Las Vegas, Nevada, United States | |
| Win | 19–8 | Bo Cantrell | KO (punches) | KOTC 44 | November 14, 2004 | 1 | 0:45 | San Jacinto, California, United States | Defended the KOTC Heavyweight Championship. |
| Win | 18–8 | Lloyd Marshbanks | TKO (punches) | EP: XXXtreme Impact | December 28, 2003 | 1 | 2:57 | Tijuana, Mexico | |
| Win | 17–8 | Bobby Hoffman | Submission (verbal) | KOTC 30 | November 2, 2003 | 2 | N/A | Pala, California, United States | Won the KOTC Heavyweight Championship. |
| Win | 16–8 | Andy Montana | KO (head kick) | Rumble on the Rock 4 | October 10, 2003 | 1 | 2:09 | Honolulu, Hawaii, United States | |
| Loss | 15–8 | Bobby Hoffman | Decision (unanimous) | KOTC 27 | August 10, 2003 | 3 | 5:00 | San Jacinto, California, United States | For the KOTC Heavyweight Championship. |
| Win | 15–7 | Mike Kyle | KO (punches) | KOTC 18 | November 1, 2002 | 2 | 1:24 | Reno, Nevada, United States | |
| Win | 14–7 | Roger Neff | KO (head kick) | KOTC 14 | June 19, 2002 | 1 | 3:04 | Bernalillo, New Mexico, United States | |
| Win | 13–7 | Jimmy Westfall | TKO (punches) | USWF 19 | September 25, 2001 | 1 | N/A | Amarillo, Texas, United States | |
| Win | 12–7 | Gary Marshall | TKO (punches) | IFC Warriors Challenge 15 | August 31, 2001 | 1 | 4:53 | Oroville, California, United States | |
| Loss | 11–7 | Nate Schroeder | Submission (heel hook) | IFC Warriors Challenge 13 | June 15, 2001 | 1 | 4:10 | California, United States | |
| Loss | 11–6 | Sam Sotello | TKO (submission to punches) | IFC Warriors Challenge 12 | April 11, 2001 | 3 | 3:22 | Friant, California, United States | |
| Loss | 11–5 | Ricco Rodriguez | Submission (kneebar) | KOTC 7 | February 24, 2001 | 2 | 4:21 | San Jacinto, California, United States | For the KOTC Openweight Superfight Championship. |
| Win | 11–4 | Larry Parker | TKO (punches) | IFC Warriors Challenge 8 | June 14, 2000 | 1 | 5:06 | Friant, California, United States | |
| Loss | 10–4 | Gan McGee | TKO (submission to punches) | IFC Warriors Challenge 7 | May 3, 2000 | 1 | 2:44 | Fresno, California, United States | IFC WC 7 Tournament Finals |
| Win | 10–3 | Rocky Batastini | Submission (armbar) | IFC Warriors Challenge 7 | May 3, 2000 | 1 | 3:47 | Fresno, California, United States | IFC WC 7 Tournament Semifinals |
| Win | 9–3 | Jason Godsey | TKO (submission to punches) | IFC Warriors Challenge 7 | May 3, 2000 | 1 | 6:06 | Fresno, California, United States | IFC WC 7 Tournament Quarterfinals |
| Win | 8–3 | Jimmy Westfall | TKO (corner stoppage) | Amarillo Fights | December 4, 1999 | 1 | 0:59 | Amarillo, Texas, United States | |
| Win | 7–3 | Denny Mathias | TKO (submission to punches) | World Class Shootfighting | November 20, 1999 | 1 | N/A | McKinney, Texas, United States | |
| Win | 6–3 | Gilbert Duran | TKO (submission to punches) | World Class Shootfighting | November 20, 1999 | 1 | N/A | McKinney, Texas, United States | |
| Loss | 5–3 | Todd Broadaway | TKO (doctor stoppage) | Extreme Challenge 24 | May 15, 1999 | 1 | 6:00 | Salt Lake City, Utah, United States | |
| Win | 5–2 | Larry Parker | KO (knee) | USWF 9 | June 20, 1998 | 1 | 0:30 | Amarillo, Texas, United States | |
| Win | 4–2 | Shane Saavedra | TKO (punches) | USWF 9 | June 20, 1998 | 1 | 2:15 | Amarillo, Texas, United States | |
| Win | 3–2 | Dustin Heronemus | Submission (neck crank) | USWF 9 | June 20, 1998 | 1 | 0:48 | Amarillo, Texas, United States | |
| Loss | 2–2 | Dan Severn | Submission (headlock) | USWF 6 | August 16, 1997 | 1 | 2:55 | Amarillo, Texas, United States | |
| Loss | 2–1 | Evan Tanner | Submission (rear-naked choke) | USWF 4 | April 12, 1997 | 1 | 2:20 | Amarillo, Texas, United States | |
| Win | 2–0 | David Davis | Submission (choke) | USWF 4 | April 12, 1997 | 1 | 7:35 | Amarillo, Texas, United States | |
| Win | 1–0 | Derek McGill | Submission (choke) | USWF 4 | April 12, 1997 | 1 | 6:00 | Amarillo, Texas, United States | |
