= Savant Young =

American mixed martial arts (MMA) fighter

- Born: June 19, 1976 (age 50); Los Angeles, California
- Other names: Black Superman
- Height: 5 ft 6 in (1.68 m)
- Weight: 155.5 lb (70.5 kg; 11.11 st)
- Division: Featherweight; Lightweight; Welterweight; Middleweight
- Reach: 67.0
- Stance: Orthodox
- Fighting out of: Pasadena, California, United States
- Team: The Fight Academy; Team Bodyshop MMA
- Years active: 1998-2013

Mixed martial arts record
- Total: 20
- Wins: 11
- By knockout: 3
- By submission: 5
- By decision: 3
- Losses: 9
- By knockout: 1
- By submission: 5
- By decision: 3

Other information
- Mixed martial arts record from Sherdog

Savant Young (born June 19, 1976) is an American retired mixed martial artist. A professional competitor from 1998 until 2013, he competed for the WEC, Bellator, Shooto, Affliction, the Tokyo Sabres of the IFL, King of the Cage, and Tachi Palace Fights.

== Mixed martial arts career ==
Although his first professional bout was in 1998, in June 2006 Young decided he wanted to begin training mixed martial arts full-time. In February 2007 Young won his first fight in the International Fight League by defeating Ed West with a unanimous decision. Young compiled a 2-2 record with the IFL, and that gave him an opportunity to fight Takeshi Inoue at Shooto. Despite Inoue being heavily favored, Young pulled off the upset and beat him by unanimous decision. Young has stated that this win is the reason he was offered a fight contract with the new Affliction Clothing Promotion. Young fought at their first event, Affliction: Banned, losing by second-round armbar against UFC veteran Mark Hominick.

== Outside MMA ==
While training part-time, Young worked in post-production at a video editing company, making the feats of others come alive on the screen. An avid video game player, Young has also had a fascination with cars, building and competing with them in street races while in high school.

== Personal life ==
Savant and his wife Rahima have two children, a girl and a boy. His mother's name is Debra Baldwin.

== Mixed martial arts record ==
Professional record breakdown
20 matches	11 wins	9 losses
By knockout	3	1
By submission	5	5
By decision	3	3

Res.	Record	Opponent	Method	Event	Date	Round	Time	Location	Notes
Win	11–9	Mike Guymon	KO (punch)	Bellator 85	January 17, 2013	2	0:48	Irvine, California, United States	Lightweight bout.
Loss	10–9	Rob Emerson	Submission (rear-naked choke)	TPF 12: Second Coming	March 9, 2012	3	4:29	Lemoore, California, United States	Catchweight (149 lbs) bout.
Win	10–8	Robert Washington	Submission (guillotine choke)	TPF 11: Redemption	December 2, 2011	2	2:41	Lemoore, California, United States	Lightweight bout.
Loss	9–8	Mark Hominick	Submission (armbar)	Affliction: Banned	July 19, 2008	2	4:25	Anaheim, California, United States	
Win	9–7	Takeshi Inoue	Decision (unanimous)	Shooto: Shooto Tradition 1	May 3, 2008	2	5:00	Tokyo, Japan	Featherweight debut.
Loss	8–7	Deividas Taurosevicius	Decision (unanimous)	IFL- 2007 Semifinals	August 2, 2008	3	4:00	East Rutherford, New Jersey, United States	
Loss	8–6	Ryan Schultz	Decision (unanimous)	IFL-Everett	June 1, 2007	3	4:00	Everett, Washington, United States	
Win	8–5	Adam Lynn	KO (punch)	IFL-Los Angeles	March 17, 2007	2	0:21	Los Angeles, California, United States	
Win	7–5	Ed West	Decision (unanimous)	IFL-Houston	February 2, 2007	3	4:00	Houston, Texas, United States	
Win	6–5	Danny Suarez	KO (superman punch)	BIB-Beatdown in Bakersfield	November 17, 2006	1	2:32	Bakersfield, California, United States	
Loss	5–5	Gabe Ruediger	Submission (armbar)	PF 1-The Beginning	May 12, 2006	3	1:29	Hollywood, California, United States	Lightweight debut.
Loss	5–4	Chris Lytle	Submission (strikes)	WEC 18: Unfinished Business	January 13, 2006	1	3:50	Lemoore, California, United States	
Loss	5–3	John Alessio	Submission (rear-naked choke)	KOTC: Shock and Awe	October 1, 2005	3	2:09	Edmonton, Alberta, Canada	Welterweight debut.
Win	5–2	Kendall Grove	Technical Submission (choke)	LIP 1: Lockdown in Paradise 1	March 19, 2005	1	2:00	Lahania, Hawaii, United States	Catchweight (192 lbs) bout; Grove missed weight.
Win	4–2	Marcus Vinicios	Decision	XP 2: Xtreme Pankration 2	March 12, 2002	N/A	N/A	Los Angeles, California, United States	
Loss	3–2	Jason Von Flue	KO (punch)	IFC WC 5: Warriors Challenge 5	September 18, 1999	1	0:05	Fresno, California, United States	
Win	3–1	Victor Hunsaker	Submission (heel hook)	NG 9: Neutral Grounds 9	January 10, 1999	1	1:55	California, United States	
Win	2–1	Ronnie Barnwell	Submission (guillotine choke)	NG 9: Neutral Grounds 9	January 10, 1999	1	1:50	California, United States	
Loss	1–1	Scott Herman	Decision	Neutral Grounds 5	June 28, 1998	1	8:00	United States	
Win	1–0	Thomas Kenny	Submission (armbar)	ES 2: Extreme Shoot 2	June 6, 1998	2		Mission Viejo, California, United States	
