= Affliction: Banned =

Affliction Clothing and Adrenaline MMA event in 2008

- The poster for Affliction: Banned
- Promotion: Affliction Clothing and Adrenaline MMA
- Date: July 19, 2008
- Venue: Honda Center
- City: Anaheim, California, United States
- Attendance: 14,832 (11,242 paid)
- Total gate: $2,085,510
- Buyrate: 100,000

Event chronology
Affliction: Banned	Affliction: Day of Reckoning

Affliction: Banned was a mixed martial arts event co-promoted by Affliction Clothing and Adrenaline MMA. It took place on July 19, 2008, at the Honda Center in Anaheim, California. The card at Banned featured many of the top MMA heavyweight fighters.

== Event details ==
The main event was the return of PRIDE World Heavyweight Championship Fedor Emelianenko fighting against former two-time UFC Heavyweight Champion Tim Sylvia. Emelianenko submitted Sylvia thirty-six seconds into the first round to win in convincing fashion.

After the fight, Randy Couture entered the ring and Emelianenko expressed his desire to fight Couture next. The event saw victories by former UFC Heavyweight Champions Andrei Arlovski and Josh Barnett, with Barnett avenging an earlier loss to Pedro Rizzo, and by former UFC Light-heavyweight Champion Vitor Belfort. Former UFC standout Matt Lindland and former Pride FC standout Antônio Rogério Nogueira won.

Megadeth performed at the event. The announcer was Michael Buffer. The disclosed total fighter payroll for the event was $3,321,000.

== Broadcasting ==
The one-hour undercard was broadcast on Fox Sports Network and The Fight Network while the main fight card was broadcast live on pay-per-view. The UFC scheduled UFC Fight Night: Silva vs. Irvin on Spike TV at the same time as the Affliction event in an attempt to diminish the PPV audience for Banned.

== Results ==
Main card
Weight class				Method	Round	Time	Notes
Heavyweight	Fedor Emelianenko	def	Tim Sylvia	Submission (rear naked choke)	1	0:36
Heavyweight	Andrei Arlovski	def	Ben Rothwell	KO (punches)	3	1:13
Heavyweight	Josh Barnett	def	Pedro Rizzo	KO (punch)	2	1:44
Light heavyweight	Renato Sobral	def	Mike Whitehead	Decision (unanimous) (30-27, 30-27, 30-27)	3	5:00
Middleweight	Matt Lindland	def	Fabio Negao	Decision (unanimous) (30-27, 30-27, 30-27)	3	5:00
Featherweight	Mark Hominick	def	Savant Young	Submission (armbar)	2	4:25
Preliminary card
Heavyweight	Paul Buentello	def	Gary Goodridge	Decision (unanimous) (30-27, 29-28, 30-27)	3	5:00
Light heavyweight	Antônio Rogério Nogueira	def	Edwin Dewees	TKO (punches)	1	4:06
Middleweight	Vitor Belfort	def	Terry Martin	KO (punch)	2	3:12
Welterweight	Mike Pyle	def	J.J. Ambrose	Submission (rear-naked choke)	1	2:55

== Fighter payroll ==
- Fedor Emelianenko ($300,000/no win bonus) def. Tim Sylvia ($800,000)
- Andrei Arlovski ($750,000/$500,000 for show and $250,000 win bonus) def. Ben Rothwell ($250,000)
- Josh Barnett ($300,000/no win bonus) def. Pedro Rizzo ($70,000)
- Mark Hominick ($10,000/$5,000 for show and $5,000 win bonus) def. Savant Young ($7,000)
- Matt Lindland ($300,000/$225,000 for show and $75,000 win bonus) def. Fabio Negao ($20,000)
- Renato Sobral ($90,000/$60,000 for show and $30,000 win bonus) def. Mike Whitehead ($50,000)
- Mike Pyle ($20,000/$15,000 for show and $5,000 win bonus) def. J.J. Ambrose ($5,000)
- Vitor Belfort ($140,000/$70,000 for show and $70,000 win bonus) def. Terry Martin ($30,000)
- Antônio Rogério Nogueira ($50,000/no win bonus) def. Edwin Dewees ($15,000)
- Paul Buentello ($80,000/$60,000 for show and $20,000 win bonus) def. Gary Goodridge ($25,000)
- Swing Bout (Canceled): Ray Lizama ($3,000) vs. Justin Levens ($6,000)

Total Base Pay: $2,866,000

Total Bonuses: $455,000

Total Payroll: $3,321,000

== Notes ==
- Vernon White, who was originally scheduled to face Antônio Rogério Nogueira, was removed from the card after testing positive for a banned substance following a May bout. Edwin Dewees was announced as a replacement.
- Bravo was scheduled to show Affliction Banned on tape delay on July 20 in the UK.
- Aleksander Emelianenko, who was originally scheduled to face Paul Buentello, was removed from the card at the last minute after Emelianenko “didn’t meet CSAC licensing standards”. Gary Goodridge was announced as a replacement.
- One swing bout between Justin Levens and Ray Lazama was set to take place after the main event, but the amount of time left and the ring condition prevented it.

== See also ==
- Affliction Entertainment
