= J. J. Ambrose =

American mixed martial arts fighter

J.J. Ambrose
- Born: Joseph Junior Ambrose; February 6, 1987 (age 39); Santa Clara, California, United States
- Other names: Superman
- Height: 5 ft 9 in (1.75 m)
- Weight: 170 lb (77 kg; 12 st)
- Division: Welterweight; Lightweight; Featherweight
- Reach: 69.5 in (177 cm)
- Stance: Orthodox
- Fighting out of: Maite, Guam, United States
- Team: STEEL Athletics; Phuket Top Team; Subfighter MMA; Tiger Muay Thai; American Kickboxing Academy; Team Bodyshop (formerly)
- Years active: 2005-2019; 2021-present

Mixed martial arts record
- Total: 50
- Wins: 36
- By knockout: 6
- By submission: 21
- By decision: 8
- Unknown: 1
- Losses: 11
- By knockout: 2
- By submission: 5
- By decision: 4
- Draws: 1
- No contests: 2

Other information
- Mixed martial arts record from Sherdog

J.J. Ambrose (born February 6, 1987) is an American mixed martial artist currently competing in One Fighting Championship. He has also competed for Bellator's Lightweight division, Affliction and Pacific Xtreme Combat.

== Background ==
Ambrose was born in Long Beach, California and later moved to Arizona after his parents divorced. He is of Italian descent and began wrestling in the fifth grade, began boxing in high school, and then began Brazilian jiu-jitsu in his senior year of high school, his first fight later that year. Ambrose graduated from Mohave High School in Bullhead City, AZ.

== Mixed martial arts career ==
=== Early career ===
Ambrose made his professional mixed martial arts debut in 2005, fighting mainly for California-based promotions. After compiling a record of ten wins, two losses and one no contest, he signed with Affliction.

=== Affliction ===
Ambrose faced Mike Pyle on July 19, 2008 at Affliction: Banned. He lost via submission in the first round.

=== Pacific Rim organizations and The Ultimate Fighter ===
After winning a bout in Mexico, Ambrose obtained more six wins in a row for Pacific Rim promotions as Pacific Xtreme Combat.

Ambrose also appeared in the first episode of The Ultimate Fighter: Team GSP vs. Team Koscheck. He lost via unanimous decision against Sevak Magakian during the entry round.

In 2012, Ambrose signed with Bellator to compete in the Lightweight Tournament.

=== Bellator Fighting Championships ===
Ambrose faced Brent Weedman on March 23, 2012 at Bellator 62 in the quarterfinal match of the season six lightweight tournament. He lost via submission in the second round.

Ambrose faced Brian Warren on January 17, 2013 at Bellator 85. He won via submission in the second round.

Ambrose faced David Rickels on October 11, 2013 at Bellator 103. Ambrose lost the bout via technical knockout in the third round.

Over four years since his fight with Rickels, Ambrose faced Saad Awad at Bellator 193 on January 26, 2018. He lost the fight via unanimous decision.

=== Post Bellator ===
Ambrose faced Spike Carlyle on October 17, 2021 at Cage Warriors 130. He lost the bout via knockout in the second round.

Ambrose faced Jordan Bailey on September 23, 2022 at Cage Warriors 143. He lost the bout via guillotine choke in the second round.

== Mixed martial arts record ==
Professional record breakdown
50 matches	36 wins	11 losses
By knockout	6	2
By submission	21	5
By decision	8	4
Unknown	1	0
Draws	1	
No contests	2	

Res.	Record	Opponent	Method	Event	Date	Round	Time	Location	Notes
Loss	36–11–1 (1)	Hoshi Friedrich	Submission (kneebar)	HEX Fight Series 37	November 22, 2025	1	4:59	Melbourne, Australia	For the vacant HEX Welterweight Championship.
Draw	36–10–1 (2)	Yoichiro Sato	Draw (time limit)	Brawl International 3	October 13, 2023	2	15:00	Tumon Bay, Guam	For the BI Welterweight Championship.
Win	36–10 (2)	John Vake	Decision (split)	Shuriken Fight Series 15	July 1, 2023	5	5:00	Auckland, New Zealand	Won the SMMA Welterweight Championship.
Loss	35–10 (2)	Jordan Bailey	Submission (guillotine choke)	Cage Warriors 143	September 23, 2022	2	3:05	San Diego, California, United States	
Win	35–9 (2)	Hoshi Friedrich	Submission (guillotine choke)	Hex Fight Series 23	August 5, 2022	2	N/A	Melbourne, Australia	Won the vacant HEX Super Lightweight Championship.
Loss	34–9 (2)	Spike Carlyle	KO (punch)	Cage Warriors 130	October 17, 2021	2	1:19	San Diego, California, United States	Catchweight (165 lb) bout.
Win	34–8 (2)	Kitt Campbell	Decision (unanimous)	Hex Fight Series 20	December 13, 2019	3	5:00	Melbourne, Australia	
Win	33–8 (2)	Akihiro Murayama	Decision (unanimous)	Pancrase 306	June 30, 2019	3	5:00	Tokyo, Japan	
Win	32–8 (2)	Art Hernandez	Submission (guillotine choke)	WFC 104	May 11, 2019	1	3:57	Laughlin, Nevada, United States	Catchweight (165 lb) bout.
Win	31–8 (2)	Beau Rawiri	Submission (guillotine choke)	Hex Fight Series 18	March 29, 2019	1	2:35	Melbourne, Australia	
Win	30–8 (2)	Alaa Mansour	Submission (guillotine choke)	Wawan MMA 18	February 22, 2019	1	1:10	Kuwait	Return to Welterweight.
Loss	29–8 (2)	Saad Awad	Decision (unanimous)	Bellator 193	January 26, 2018	3	5:00	Temecula, California, United States	
Win	29–7 (2)	Ben Wall	Decision (unanimous)	Hex Fight Series 9	June 23, 2016	3	5:00	Melbourne, Victoria, Australia	
Win	28–7 (2)	Takahiro Ashida	Submission (guillotine choke)	Pacific Xtreme Combat 56	March 25, 2017	4	N/A	Mangilao, Guam	Won the vacant PXC Lightweight Championship.
Win	27–7 (2)	Dylan Fussell	Decision (unanimous)	Pacific Xtreme Combat 55	November 18, 2016	3	5:00	Mangilao, Guam	Return to Lightweight.
Win	26–7 (2)	Francisco Treviño	Submission (guillotine choke)	Hex Fight Series 6	June 26, 2016	2	4:35	Melbourne, Victoria, Australia	
Win	25–7 (2)	Fabio Mello	TKO (punches)	Gladiators Fighting Championship 9	May 27, 2016	2	3:48	Mishref, Kuwait	Featherweight bout.
Loss	24–7 (2)	Francisco Treviño	Decision (split)	Hex Fight Series 5	February 20, 2016	3	5:00	Melbourne, Victoria, Australia	
Win	24–6 (2)	Oriol Gaset	Submission (guillotine choke)	Hex Fight Series 4	October 31, 2015	1	2:57	Melbourne, Victoria, Australia	
Win	23–6 (2)	Ricky Legere	Submission (guillotine choke)	KOTC: Bitter Rivals	August 29, 2015	1	1:36	Ontario, California, United States	Return to Welterweight.
Loss	22–6 (2)	Kazuki Tokudome	Decision (unanimous)	Pancrase: 267	May 31, 2015	3	5:00	Tokyo, Japan	
Win	22–5 (2)	Ahmad Ibrahim	Submission (guillotine choke)	Gladiator Fighting Championship 6	May 30, 2014	2	0:48	Kuwait City, Kuwait	Defended the GFC Lightweight Championship.
Win	21–5 (2)	Adam Gonzalez	Submission (rear-naked choke)	WFC: World Fighting Championships 21	May 10, 2014	1	1:21	Laughlin, Nevada, United States	Welterweight bout.
Loss	20–5 (2)	David Rickels	TKO (punches)	Bellator 103	October 11, 2013	3	2:37	Mulvane, Kansas, United States	
Win	20–4 (2)	Ibrahim Ahmed	Submission (rear-naked choke)	Gladiator Fighting Championship 3	April 26, 2013	1	3:27	Kuwait City, Kuwait	Won the GFC Lightweight Championship.
NC	19–4 (2)	Ibrahim Ahmed	No Contest	Gladiator Fighting Championship 2	February 9, 2013	1	2:00	Kuwait City, Kuwait	
Win	19–4 (1)	Brian Warren	Submission (guillotine choke)	Bellator 85	January 17, 2013	2	0:50	Irvine, California, United States	Catchweight (165 lb) bout.
Win	18–4 (1)	Mu Gyeom Choi	KO (punch)	PRO FC 7	July 29, 2012	2	N/A	Taipei, Taiwan	
Loss	17–4 (1)	Brent Weedman	Submission (Von Flue choke)	Bellator 62	March 23, 2012	2	3:26	Laredo, Texas, United States	Bellator Season 6 Lightweight Tournament Quarterfinal
Win	17–3 (1)	Sebastien Garguier	Decision (unanimous)	Pacific Xtreme Combat 27	October 29, 2011	3	5:00	Mangilao, Guam, United States	
Win	16–3 (1)	Robert Palacios	Submission (punches)	Rites of Passage 11	September 9, 2011	1	1:59	Saipan, Northern Mariana Islands, United States	
Win	15–3 (1)	Masakazu Taguchi	TKO (punches)	Trench Warz 13	October 29, 2010	1	1:01	Saipan, Northern Mariana Islands, United States	
Win	14–3 (1)	Gyo Pyung Hwang	Technical submission (D'arce choke)	Pacific Xtreme Combat 20	July 24, 2010	1	3:20	Mangilao, Guam, United States	
Win	13–3 (1)	Bill Saures	Submission (guillotine choke)	Pacific Xtreme Combat 18	September 19, 2009	1	1:45	Mangilao, Guam, United States	
Win	12–3 (1)	Hideto Kondo	Submission (rear-naked choke)	Pacific Xtreme Combat 17	March 27, 2009	1	3:26	Mangilao, Guam, United States	
Win	11–3 (1)	Iure Silva	Submission (armbar)	Cage of Fire 14	November 15, 2008	3	2:19	Guadalajara, Jalisco, Mexico	
Loss	10–3 (1)	Mike Pyle	Submission (rear-naked choke)	Affliction: Banned	July 19, 2008	1	2:51	Anaheim, California, United States	
Win	10–2 (1)	Jason Cordero	Submission (rear-naked choke)	Total Fighting Alliance 10	March 22, 2008	1	1:14	Santa Monica, California, United States	
Win	9–2 (1)	Iure Silva	Submission (rear-naked choke)	Cage of Fire 10	November 24, 2007	1	3:43	Mexico	
Win	8–2 (1)	Jason Cordero	Submission (rear-naked choke)	Total Fighting Alliance 8	October 6, 2007	1	2:59	Santa Monica, California, United States	
Win	7–2 (1)	Marco Soto	TKO (punches)	Cage of Fire 9	August 25, 2007	1	N/A	Mexico	
Win	6–2 (1)	Adam Lehman	Submission (guillotine choke)	Total Fighting Alliance 7	April 28, 2007	1	1:43	Santa Monica, California, United States	
Win	5–2 (1)	Ben Gonzalez	TKO (punches)	Total Fighting Alliance 6	April 28, 2007	2	2:06	Santa Monica, California, United States	
NC	4–2 (1)	Adam Lehman	No Contest	Total Fighting Alliance 5	February 24, 2007	1	1:29	Santa Monica, California, United States	
Win	4–2	Andrew Flores	Decision (unanimous)	Total Fighting Alliance 4	November 3, 2006	3	5:00	Carson, California, United States	
Win	3–2	Jason Zickerman	Submission (rear-naked choke)	California Xtreme Fighting 2	July 15, 2006	1	2:36	Upland, California, United States	
Loss	2–2	Vince Guzman	Submission (triangle choke)	California Xtreme Fighting 1	April 29, 2006	2	2:48	Upland, California, United States	
Loss	2–1	Luke Hodges	Decision (unanimous)	Total Combat 11	December 10, 2005	3	5:00	Yuma, Arizona, United States	
Win	2–0	Adam Lehman	Decision (unanimous)	WFC: Rumble at the Ramada	December 8, 2005	3	N/A	Norwalk, California, United States	
Win	1–0	Donald Bolt	N/A	Kage Kombat	November 12, 2005	N/A	N/A	California, United States	

== Personal life ==
Ambrose owns and operates a gym, STEEL Athletics in Guam.

== See also ==
- List of male mixed martial artists
