= Bob Gilstrap =

American and MMA fighter

Robert Gilstrap
- Born: 1974 (age 51–52)
- Other names: Bob Gilstrap
- Nationality: American
- Height: 6 ft 3 in (1.91 m)
- Weight: 210 lb (95 kg; 15 st)
- Division: Heavyweight
- Fighting out of: Bellevue, Washington

Mixed martial arts record
- Total: 12
- Wins: 5
- By knockout: 2
- By submission: 3
- Losses: 7
- By knockout: 1
- By submission: 1
- By decision: 4
- By disqualification: 1

Other information
- Mixed martial arts record from Sherdog

Robert "Bob" Gilstrap (born 1974) is an American former mixed martial artist who competed in the Heavyweight division. He lost the last fight of his career at AMC - Return of the Gladiators 1 against Jeff Monson on July 29, 2000.

== Mixed martial arts record ==
Professional record breakdown
12 matches	5 wins	7 losses
By knockout	2	1
By submission	3	1
By decision	0	4
By disqualification	0	1

Res.	Record	Opponent	Method	Event	Date	Round	Time	Location	Notes
Loss	5–7	Brandon Anderson	TKO	FE: Fightstorm Entertainment	September 6, 2004	2	N/A	Sidney, Montana, United States	
Loss	5–6	(United States) Jeff Monson	Decision (unanimous)	AMC: Return of the Gladiators 1	July 29, 2000	3	5:00	Washington, United States	
Loss	5–5	Gary Armbrust	Decision	WCT: Western Canada's Toughest	March 18, 2000	N/A		Canada	
Loss	5–4	(Canada) Carlos Newton	Submission (triangle choke)	UFC 17	May 15, 1998	1	0:52	Alabama, United States	
Loss	5–3	(United States) Josh Barnett	DQ (illegal strikes)	UFCF: Night of Champions	March 14, 1998	1	0:42		
Loss	5–2	(Brazil) Dario Amorim	Decision (unanimous)	IVC 4: The Battle	February 7, 1998	1	30:00	Brazil	
Win	5–1	(Brazil) Lucas Silva de Jesus	TKO (submission to punches)	IVC 4: The Battle	February 7, 1998	1	2:25	Brazil	
Win	4–1	(Canada) Jason Fairn	TKO (submission to knees)	RC: RAW Combat	July 26, 1997	N/A	7:59	Vancouver, British Columbia, Canada	
Loss	3–1	(United States) Josh Barnett	Decision (unanimous)	UFCF 2	July 7, 1997	1	10:00	Washington, United States	
Win	3–0	(Canada) Lance Gibson	TKO (rear naked choke)	SB 4: SuperBrawl 4	April 9, 1997	1	4:53	Hawaii, United States	
Win	2–0	(United States) John Matua	Submission (armbar)	SB 4: SuperBrawl 4	April 9, 1997	1	4:41	Hawaii, United States	
Win	1–0	(United States) Chris Munsen	Submission (choke)	UFCF: Clash of the Titans	January 11, 1997	1	6:29		
