= UFC Fight Night: Arlovski vs. Barnett =

UFC mixed martial arts event in 2016

- The poster for UFC Fight Night: Arlovski vs. Barnett
- Promotion: Ultimate Fighting Championship
- Date: September 3, 2016
- Venue: Barclaycard Arena
- City: Hamburg, Germany
- Attendance: 11,763
- Total gate: $913,428

Event chronology
UFC on Fox: Maia vs. Condit	UFC Fight Night: Arlovski vs. Barnett	UFC 203: Miocic vs. Overeem

UFC Fight Night: Arlovski vs. Barnett (also known as UFC Fight Night 93) was a mixed martial arts event produced by the Ultimate Fighting Championship held on September 3, 2016, at Barclaycard Arena in Hamburg, Germany.

== Background ==
After holding four previous events in Germany (Cologne, Oberhausen and Berlin twice), the event was the first that the organization has hosted in Hamburg.

A heavyweight bout between former UFC Heavyweight Champions Andrei Arlovski and Josh Barnett served as the event headliner.

Promotional newcomer Emil Weber Meek was expected to face fellow newcomer Jessin Ayari at the event. However, Meek was removed from the card on July 20 due to "compliance" issues, related to the UFC’s Anti-Doping Policy. One week later, he was replaced by another newcomer Jim Wallhead.

Reza Madadi was expected to face Rustam Khabilov at the event. However on July 25, Madadi pulled out due to undisclosed reasons and was replaced by Leandro Silva.

A long rumored fight between Henry Briones and Brad Pickett was expected to take place on the card. However, Briones was replaced in early August for undisclosed reasons by Iuri Alcântara. Subsequently, that pairing was rescheduled to take place a month later at UFC 204.

Aisling Daly was expected to face former Invicta FC Atomweight Champion Michelle Waterson at the event. However, Daly was pulled from the fight on August 9 due to injury. Promotion officials reportedly searched to replace Daly in an attempt to keep Waterson on the card. In turn, Waterson was removed from the card after injuring her finger.

Germaine de Randamie was scheduled to face Ashlee Evans-Smith on the card. However, de Randamie pulled out of the fight in mid-August citing a foot injury and was replaced by promotional newcomer Veronica Macedo.

A featherweight bout between promotional newcomers Martin Buschkamp and Alex Enlund was scrapped from the card during the week leading up to the event due to Enlund being injured.

== Results ==
Main Card (UFC Fight Pass)
Weight class				Method	Round	Time	Notes
Heavyweight	Josh Barnett	def.	Andrei Arlovski	Submission (rear-naked choke)	3	2:53
Light Heavyweight	Alexander Gustafsson	def.	Jan Błachowicz	Decision (unanimous) (30–27, 30–27, 30–27)	3	5:00
Light Heavyweight	Ryan Bader	def.	Ilir Latifi	KO (knee)	2	2:06
Lightweight	Nick Hein	def.	Tae Hyun Bang	Decision (unanimous) (29–28, 30–28, 30–27)	3	5:00
Preliminary Card (UFC Fight Pass)
Welterweight	Jessin Ayari	def.	Jim Wallhead	Decision (split) (28–29, 29–28, 30–27)	3	5:00
Welterweight	Peter Sobotta	def.	Nicolas Dalby	Decision (unanimous) (30–26, 30–26, 30–26)	3	5:00
Women's Bantamweight	Ashlee Evans-Smith	def.	Veronica Macedo	TKO (punches and elbows)	3	2:46
Bantamweight	Taylor Lapilus	def.	Leandro Issa	Decision (unanimous) (30–27, 30–27, 29–28)	3	5:00
Heavyweight	Christian Colombo	vs.	Jarjis Danho	Draw (majority) (29–27, 28–28, 28–28)	3	5:00	(Note: Colombo was deducted one point in round 1 due to an illegal knee.)
Middleweight	Jack Hermansson	def.	Scott Askham	Decision (unanimous) (30–27, 30–27, 29–28)	3	5:00
Lightweight	Rustam Khabilov	def.	Leandro Silva	Decision (unanimous) (29–28, 29–28, 30–27)	3	5:00

== Bonus awards ==
The following fighters were awarded $50,000 bonuses:

- Fight of the Night: Josh Barnett vs. Andrei Arlovski
- Performance of the Night: Josh Barnett and Ryan Bader

== See also ==
- List of UFC events
- 2016 in UFC
