= Andrei Arlovski =

Belarusian-American mixed martial artist (born 1979)

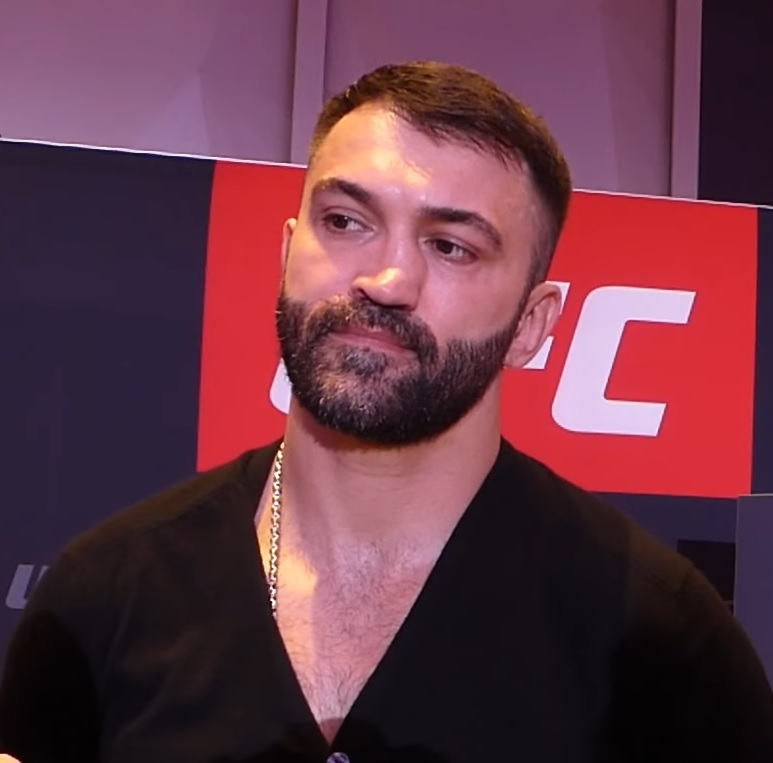
- Arlovski at UFC Fight Night 136, September 2018
- Born: Andrei Valeryevich Arlovski; 4 February 1979 (age 47); Bobruysk, Byelorussian SSR, Soviet Union (now Babruysk, Belarus)
- Other names: The Pit Bull
- Nationality: Belarusian; American
- Height: 6 ft 4 in (193 cm)
- Weight: 245 lb (111 kg; 17 st 7 lb)
- Division: Heavyweight
- Reach: 77 in (196 cm)
- Fighting out of: Chicago, Illinois, U.S.
- Team: Jackson Wink MMA (2009–2017); American Top Team (2017–present)
- Rank: International Master of Sport in Sambo
- Years active: 1999–present (MMA)

Mixed martial arts record
- Total: 60
- Wins: 34
- By knockout: 17
- By submission: 3
- By decision: 14
- Losses: 24
- By knockout: 12
- By submission: 3
- By decision: 9
- No contests: 2

Bare-knuckle boxing record
- Total: 2
- Wins: 2
- By knockout: 2
- Losses: 0
- By knockout: 0

Other information
- Website: www.arlovski.com
- Mixed martial arts record from Sherdog

Andrei Arlovski (Belarusian: Андрэй Валер’евіч Арлоўскі, romanized: Andrei Arlouski, born 4 February 1979) is a Belarusian-American professional mixed martial artist, bare knuckle boxer, and actor. He competes for Bare Knuckle Fighting Championship (BKFC), where he is the current BKFC Heavyweight Champion. A former UFC Heavyweight Champion, he competed in the heavyweight division for the Ultimate Fighting Championship (UFC) and holds the record for most wins (23) in UFC heavyweight history. Arlovski has also competed for Strikeforce, WSOF, Affliction, EliteXC, ONE FC and M-1 Challenge.

== Early life ==
Arlovski was born in Babruisk, Byelorussian SSR, Soviet Union (now Belarus). When he was younger, bullies often picked on him and beat him up. In 1994, when he was 14 years old, he had finally had enough and started lifting weights to put on muscle and, he hoped, to help him deal with these bullies. Arlovski took up martial arts at the age of 16 in sports such as Sambo, Judo and Kickboxing.

Enrolling at the police academy in Minsk, Arlovski combined his interest in a career in law enforcement with his growing martial arts participation by taking up the required police defense course in Sambo and quickly showed himself to be a highly competent Sambo opponent. In 1999, Arlovski won the European Youth Sambo Championship and the World Youth Championship. Not long after, Arlovski became the first Master of Sports and then International Master of Sports. He took a silver medal at the Sambo World Cup and another silver medal at the World Sambo Championship.

Arlovski began taking a greater interest in other martial arts, studying kickboxing and developing his striking skills to complement his Sambo-based grappling abilities.

== Mixed martial arts career ==
At the age of 20, Arlovski began his professional MMA career at the Mix Fight M-1 in St Petersburg, Russia on 9 April 1999 facing Viacheslav Datsik. After a competitive stand up battle, Arlovski would be knocked out with a hard straight, losing his debut. Not deterred, Arlovski returned in 2000 to M-1 Global at the European Championships, taking the heavyweight crown with a submission victory and a KO victory.

=== Ultimate Fighting Championship ===
Arlovski made his Ultimate Fighting Championship debut at UFC 28, defeating Aaron Brink by submission. He was then thrown in against top opposition, losing to future UFC Heavyweight Champion Ricco Rodriguez at UFC 32 and heavyweight contender Pedro Rizzo at UFC 36. Despite those early defeats, wins over future British Cage Rage Light heavyweight Champion Ian Freeman at UFC 40 and future IFL Light heavyweight Champion Vladimir Matyushenko at UFC 44 propelled Arlovski back into the UFC elite.

In 2004, a motorcycle accident injury suffered by then UFC Heavyweight Champion Frank Mir led to the creation of an interim heavyweight title. It was decided that the two top heavyweight contenders would meet to declare the interim champion. Arlovski faced former heavyweight champion, Tim Sylvia. They were originally supposed to fight at UFC 47, but Sylvia was pulled from the fight due to recurring positive drug tests. Arlovski ended up facing Wesley Correira, winning the fight via TKO in the second round. The pairing of Arlovski and Sylvia remained intact and occurred at UFC 51. In the fight, Arlovski eventually connected with an overhand right and dropped Sylvia. On the ground, Arlovski followed up with an Achilles lock that forced Sylvia to tap out at 47 seconds of the first round, making Arlovski the new UFC Interim Heavyweight Champion.

Arlovski went on to defend his interim title on 4 June 2005, at UFC 53, against Justin Eilers. Arlovski won the bout by TKO in the first round. After the fight, it was revealed that Eilers had suffered extensive injuries, including a badly broken nose, two broken hands and a complete ACL tear.

In October 2005, Arlovski once again defended his title at UFC 55 against top contender Paul Buentello. Arlovski knocked out Buentello in 15 seconds of the opening round. On 12 August 2005, the UFC announced that it now recognized Arlovski as the undisputed heavyweight champion, as Frank Mir had not fully rehabilitated from his motorcycle accident.

In a rematch with Tim Sylvia at UFC 59 on 15 April 2006, Arlovski knocked Sylvia down with a right-hand punch early in the first round. Sylvia was able to protect himself and recovered almost immediately. While Arlovski tried to finish Sylvia with a right lead, Sylvia countered with a short right uppercut to the chin, knocking Arlovski to the mat. Sylvia followed up with punches on the ground until referee Herb Dean stopped the match at 2:43 of the first round.

The rubber match between Tim Sylvia and Arlovski took place on 8 July 2006, at UFC 61. In what turned out to be a 5-round battle of attrition, neither fighter was able to KO the other, or even land any truly significant blows. In the end, Sylvia won the fight by unanimous decision. It was later discovered that during the fight, Arlovski had been significantly injured by a checked leg kick sometime in the second round which left him unable to throw kicks of his own or make any takedown attempts. When confronted by a reporter about the injury, Arlovski avoided responding directly and would only say "I do not want to talk about my injuries or look for any other excuses." Not too long after it was revealed Sylvia had sustained an injury as he fainted at his hotel room and upon hospital examination, doctors discovered a concussion.

Arlovski made his next appearance on 30 December 2006, at UFC 66 against Brazilian Jiu-Jitsu black belt Márcio Cruz. After being taken down, he kicked Cruz in the shoulder (which is legal), but it was mistaken for a head kick (which is illegal) by referee Herb Dean. When the referee intervened, he decided, because of Cruz's insistence, to allow both fighters to stay on the ground as opposed to standing them up, as is the general practice. Thereafter, Arlovski struck Cruz with a strong blow to the chin, then continued beating Cruz with hammer fists until the fight was stopped.

Arlovski fought PRIDE veteran and two-time world Brazilian Jiu-Jitsu champion Fabrício Werdum at UFC 70, winning by unanimous decision. Both fighters kept their distance for the majority of the fight, causing the referee to inform them at the beginning of the third round that he would remove a point from the first fighter to retreat in that round. Although Arlovski won the fight by unanimous decision, many boos could be heard from the crowd. After the fight, Arlovski apologized to the fans for not fighting for the full fifteen minutes.

After 11 months of inactivity, Arlovski made his return to the octagon at UFC 82 and defeated Jake O'Brien by TKO in round two. It was O'Brien's first MMA loss and Arlovski's final fight on his UFC contract.

=== Affliction Entertainment ===
After leaving the UFC, Arlovski signed with the newly created MMA-promotion Affliction and participated in their inaugural event Affliction: Banned on 19 July 2008. He fought and defeated top-ranked heavyweight fighter and former IFL heavyweight stand-out Ben Rothwell by KO in the final round of the fight, ending Rothwell's 13 fight win streak and giving him his first defeat in over 3 years.

Originally scheduled to face former UFC Heavyweight Champion and top-ranked heavyweight Josh Barnett in the main event at Affliction's second pay-per-view, Affliction: Day of Reckoning, on 11 October 2008, the event was rescheduled and Arlovski would instead be matched up against the last reigning IFL Heavyweight Champion Roy Nelson at EliteXC: Heat on 4 October 2008, in Sunrise, Florida in a co-promotion with EliteXC. Arlovski won the fight via KO in the second round and in the process became the only man to ever finish Nelson in his MMA career at that point.

In January 2009, Arlovski faced the last reigning PRIDE heavyweight champion Fedor Emelianenko at Affliction: Day of Reckoning. Arlovski lost the fight via KO in the first round.

=== Strikeforce ===
On 6 June 2009, Arlovski fought up and coming heavyweight Brett Rogers at Strikeforce: Lawler vs. Shields. Arlovski lost the fight via TKO in the opening round. After the defeat, in October 2009, Arlovski began training with acclaimed MMA coach Greg Jackson. Arlovski was a featured attendee at Strikeforce: Emelianenko vs. Rogers, where he was mobbed by a crowd of local Chicago fans. Arlovski was signed to Strikeforce and fought former EliteXC heavyweight champion Antônio Silva on 15 May 2010, at Strikeforce: Heavy Artillery. Following 3 rounds of hard-hitting punches from both and with neither fighter giving in to the other, Arlovski lost by unanimous decision.

Arlovski was defeated by Sergei Kharitonov via KO on 12 February 2011, as part of the Strikeforce Heavyweight Grand Prix Tournament. It was his fourth straight loss, three of which were by way of KO. On 17 February 2011, Arlovski posted a video on his website in which he spoke for over an hour, repeatedly saying that he would absolutely not retire. Arlovski indicated that his trainers had recommended that he retire; however, Greg Jackson was against his retirement. Arlovski dedicated himself to training exclusively with Greg Jackson in New Mexico to refocus on his MMA career and make the necessary changes to get back on track.

=== ProElite ===
After several months of grueling training schedule in New Mexico with Greg Jackson and the likes of Jon Jones, Shane Carwin, and Travis Browne, Arlovski headlined ProElite 1 on 27 August at the Neal S. Blaisdell Center in Honolulu, Hawaii against heavyweight Ray Lopez. Arlovski won by TKO in the third round after dominating Lopez throughout the fight.

Arlovski faced off against veteran of over 300 fights Travis Fulton at ProElite 2 in November, serving as the co-main event. Arlovski won the fight via head kick KO in the final second of the third round. It was a knockout that caused Fulton, who had never been knocked out, to regain consciousness about 5 minutes after the fight was stopped. Fulton later admitted to Arlovski in the locker room that he has never been hit that hard in all of his 300 bouts.

=== ONE Fighting Championship ===
In mid-July 2012, it was announced that Arlovski had signed with the Asia-based promotion ONE Fighting Championship. Originally Arlovski was scheduled to fight Soa Palelei but Soa Palelei was later replaced with Tim Sylvia. The promotion quickly announced that Arlovski would face Tim Sylvia in his debut, marking the fourth time the two fighters had faced each other.

Arlovski and Sylvia faced off at ONE Fighting Championship: Pride of a Nation on 31 August 2012, in Manila. The fight between Arlovski and Tim Sylvia ended in a no-contest due to an illegal soccer kick by Arlovski. According to ONE FC rules, soccer kicks are legal only if the referee clears the fighter to do so after determining the grounded fighter can still intelligently defend himself. Arlovski received no such clearance and the kick was therefore deemed illegal. Four days later, One FC eliminated this restriction. This rule change, had it been enforced prior to the bout, would have resulted in Arlovski winning by TKO. Arlovski had knocked Tim Sylvia down with punches before he landed the illegal kicks that caused the referee to stop the fight.

=== World Series of Fighting ===
Arlovski headlined the debut event from the World Series of Fighting against fellow Strikeforce veteran Devin Cole on 3 November 2012, at World Series of Fighting 1 in Las Vegas, Nevada. This event aired live on NBC Sports. He won the fight via TKO in the first round.

Arlovski fought Anthony Johnson in the main event at World Series of Fighting 2 on 23 March 2013. He lost the fight via unanimous decision. Controversy arose after the fight when it was revealed that multiple rounds exceeded the five-minute time limit. The punch believed to have broken Arlovski's jaw was landed after the time at which the round should have ended.

Arlovski next replaced an injured Anthony Johnson against Mike Kyle at WSOF 5 on 14 September 2013. He won the fight via unanimous decision.

=== Independent promotions ===
Arlovski faced Bellator veteran Mike Hayes at Fight Nights: Battle of Moscow 9 on 16 December 2012, in Moscow, Russia. He won the fight via unanimous decision.

Arlovski was also scheduled to fight two-time ADCC Submission Wrestling World Champion and veteran of over 60 fights Jeff Monson in Rio de Janeiro, Brazil on 2 February 2013, but the event was postponed.

Arlovski fought Andreas Kraniotakes at Fight Nights - Battle in Minsk on 29 November 2013, and Arlovski won the fight via TKO in the second round.

=== Return to UFC ===
On 24 April 2014, it was confirmed by multiple MMA media websites that Arlovski had been granted his release from WSOF to return to UFC. The former heavyweight champion fought Brendan Schaub at UFC 174 on 14 June 2014. Arlovski was victorious in his return to the UFC, defeating Schaub via split decision (28–29, 29–28, and 29–28).

It was announced that Arlovski would be facing Antônio Silva in a rematch on 13 September 2014, at UFC Fight Night 51. Despite being a heavy betting underdog, Arlovski won the fight via knockout in the first round, after landing two consecutive right hands that dropped Silva and subsequent hammer fists on the ground with Silva unable to defend himself. This win also won Arlovski his first Performance of the Night bonus award.

Arlovski faced Travis Browne on 23 May 2015, at UFC 187. Despite being a heavy underdog and being knocked down in the first round, Arlovski stunned Browne multiple times throughout the opening minutes, and eventually won the fight via TKO in the first round. Post-fight, Joe Rogan revealed in the commentary that Arlovski came close to withdrawing from the fight due to a calf injury in training. The win also earned Arlovski his first Fight of the Night bonus award.

Arlovski faced Frank Mir on 5 September 2015, at UFC 191, winning by unanimous decision (29–28, 29–28, and 30–27) in a fight which many, including UFC president Dana White, thought Mir won. 12 of 15 media outlets, however, scored the bout in favor of Arlovski.

Arlovski returned to face Stipe Miocic on 2 January 2016, at UFC 195. He was defeated via TKO in the first round.

Arlovski faced Alistair Overeem on 8 May 2016, at UFC Fight Night 87. After a back and forth first round, Arlovski lost the fight via TKO in the second round.

Arlovski next faced Josh Barnett on 3 September 2016, at UFC Fight Night 93. He lost the fight via rear naked choke submission in the third round, resulting in his first submission loss in his professional MMA career. Both participants were awarded Fight of the Night for their performance.

Arlovski faced Francis Ngannou on 28 January 2017 at UFC on Fox 23. He lost the fight via TKO in the first round.

Arlovski faced Marcin Tybura on 17 June 2017 at UFC Fight Night 111. He lost the fight by unanimous decision (29–28, 28–27, and 29–27).

After five consecutive defeats, Arlovski relocated his training to American Top Team.

Arlovski faced Júnior Albini at UFC Fight Night: Poirier vs. Pettis on 11 November 2017 in Norfolk, Virginia. He won the fight via unanimous decision.

Arlovski faced Stefan Struve on 4 March 2018 at UFC 222. He won the fight by unanimous decision. In the fight, Arlovski landed a career-best 4 takedowns, more than his entire career total up to that time (3) combined.

Arlovski faced Tai Tuivasa at UFC 225 on 9 June 2018. He lost the fight via unanimous decision.

Arlovski faced Shamil Abdurakhimov on 15 September 2018 at UFC Fight Night 136. He lost the fight by unanimous decision.

Arlovski faced Walt Harris on 29 December 2018 at UFC 232. He lost the fight via split decision. The result was overturned to no contest after Harris tested positive for prohibited substance LGB4033, a selective androgen receptor modulator (SARM).

Arlovski faced Augusto Sakai on 27 April 2019 at UFC Fight Night: Jacaré vs. Hermansson. He lost the fight by a controversial split decision.

A rematch with Ben Rothwell took place on 20 July 2019 at UFC on ESPN 4. He won the fight via unanimous decision and set the all-time record for UFC heavyweight victories at 17.

His next fight was with Jairzinho Rozenstruik on 2 November 2019 at UFC 244. He lost the fight via knockout in round one.

Arlovski was scheduled to face Philipe Lins on 2 May 2020 at UFC Fight Night: Hermansson vs. Weidman. However, on 9 April, Dana White, the president of UFC announced that this event was postponed due to the ongoing Coronavirus pandemic. and rescheduled to 13 May 2020, at UFC Fight Night: Smith vs. Teixeira. He won the fight via unanimous decision.

Arlovski was expected to face Tanner Boser on 4 October 2020 at UFC on ESPN: Holm vs. Aldana. However a sickness with Arlovski delayed the bout four weeks later to UFC on ESPN: Santos vs. Teixeira. Arlovski won the fight via unanimous decision.

Arlovski faced Tom Aspinall on 20 February 2021 at UFC Fight Night 185. He lost the fight via a rear naked choke submission in round two.

Arlovski faced Chase Sherman, replacing Parker Porter, on 17 April 2021 at UFC on ESPN 22. He won the fight via unanimous decision.

Arlovski faced Carlos Felipe on 16 October 2021 at UFC Fight Night 195. He won the fight via unanimous decision.

Arlovski faced Jared Vanderaa on 12 February 2022, at UFC 271. He won the fight via split decision. 18 out of 18 media outlets scored the fight in favor of Arlovski.

Arlovski faced Jake Collier, replacing Justin Tafa, on 30 April 2022, at UFC on ESPN 35. He won the fight via split decision. 14 out of 14 media scores gave it to Collier.

Arlovski faced Marcos Rogério de Lima on 29 October 2022, at UFC Fight Night 213. He lost the fight via rear-naked choke in round one.

Arlovski faced Don'Tale Mayes on 3 June 2023, at UFC on ESPN 46. He lost the fight via technical knockout in the second round.

Arlovski faced Waldo Cortes-Acosta on 13 January 2024 at UFC Fight Night 234. He lost the bout by unanimous decision.

Arlovski was to face Martin Buday on 15 June 2024, at UFC Fight Night 242. However, for unknown reasons, it was moved to UFC 303, which took place on 29 June 2024. He lost the fight by split decision. 7 out of 12 media outlets scored the fight for Arlovski.

On 30 June 2024, it was reported that Arlovski fought his last UFC fight at UFC 303 and was not re-signing with the UFC.

=== Global Fight League ===
On 11 December 2024, it was announced that Arlovski was signed by the Global Fight League. However, in April 2025, the company cancelled all upcoming events indefefintely citing an investor pullout.

== Boxing bouts ==
=== Dirty boxing ===
Arlovski faced Terrance Hodges on 22 March 2025, at Dirty Boxing Championship's "DBX 1". He won the fight by technical knockout due to a referee stoppage in the second round, which was his first combat sports finish in ten years.

=== Bare Knuckle boxing ===
Arlovski was scheduled to make his Bare Knuckle Fighting Championship debut against Geronimo dos Santos on 21 June 2025, at BKFC 76. However, for unknown reasons, dos Santos withdrew from the bout and was replaced by Josh Copeland. Arlovski won the fight by technical knockout at the end of the fourth round.

Arlovski faced Ben Rothwell for the BKFC World Heavyweight Championship on 7 February 2026 at BKFC Knucklemania VI. He won the bout by third-round TKO. The match was their first meeting in bare‑knuckle boxing after two previous fights in mixed martial arts, which Arlovski also won.

=== Professional boxing ===
On 28 October 2025, it was announced that Arlovski would make his professional boxing debut against Nigerian reality star Kelz in four-round bout on the MF Duel: Cracra vs Fox undercard. The bout took place on 9 November at the Nashville Municipal Auditorium in Nashville, Tennessee, U.S. He won the fight by knockout in the fourth round.

Arlovski is scheduled to face Chase DeMoor on 18 December 2026 for the MFB Heavyweight Title at MF: New Blood.

== Personal life ==
Arlovski resides in Coconut Creek, Florida, with his wife and two sons. He previously owned a pit bull terrier named Maximus, who died. He is an Orthodox Christian. Arlovski did a public service announcement against dog fighting featuring Maximus and calling it inhumane and torture. Arlovski said he chose his nickname The Pitbull for the positive qualities these dogs have.

Arlovski has openly spoken about overcoming cancer three times.

== Movie and television career ==
Arlovski's movie debut was in 8 of Diamonds in 2006. He starred in Universal Soldier: Regeneration in 2009, along with Jean-Claude Van Damme and Dolph Lundgren. In the movie, he plays an "NGU", a new generation UniSol in the main "bad guy" role. The movie was released directly to video on 2 February 2010, in the United States. Arlovski also played a part in the next Universal Soldier movie — Universal Soldier: Day of Reckoning, released in theaters on 30 November 2012, and on demand on 25 October 2012.

In 2015, Arlovski appeared on the TV show Limitless in episode 7 "Brian Finch's Black Op". Arlovski played the role of a suspected terrorist hunted by the CIA. The show originally aired 3 November 2015.

Arlovski appeared on Mayhem Miller's MTV show Bully Beatdown, in which he beat the 'bully', thereby earning the 'victims' $10,000.

In 2018, Arlovski had a small role as a mob enforcer opposite Denzel Washington in the opening scene of The Equalizer 2.

== Championships and accomplishments ==
=== Mixed martial arts ===
- Ultimate Fighting Championship
  - UFC Heavyweight Championship (One time; former)
    - One successful title defense
    - First Belarusian champion in UFC history
  - Interim UFC Heavyweight Championship (One time; first; former)
    - One successful title defense
  - Fight of the Night (Two times) vs. Josh Barnett and Travis Browne
  - Performance of the Night (One time) vs. Antônio Silva
  - UFC Encyclopedia Awards
    - Fight of the Night (One time) vs. Ricco Rodriguez
    - Knockout of the Night (Two times) vs. Vladimir Matyushenko and Paul Buentello
    - Submission of the Night (Two times) vs. Aaron Brink and Tim Sylvia
  - Tied (Donald Cerrone) for fifth most wins in UFC history (23)
    - Most wins in UFC heavyweight history (23)
  - Second most bouts in UFC history (42)
    - Most bouts in UFC heavyweight history (42)
    - Third most bouts in Zuffa, LLC (UFC, Pride, WEC, Strikeforce) history (45) (behind Donald Cerrone & Jim Miller)
  - Most total fight time in UFC heavyweight history (6:49:58)
  - Most decision wins in UFC Heavyweight history (12)
    - Most decision bouts in UFC Heavyweight history (19)
    - Tied for third most wins by decision in UFC history (12)
  - Most significant strikes landed in UFC heavyweight history (1585)
    - Most strikes landed in UFC heavyweight history (1907)
  - Tied (Gabriel Gonzaga, Stefan Struve & Francis Ngannou) for third most finishes in UFC Heavyweight division history (11)
  - Tied (Cain Velasquez & Ciryl Gane) for second longest win streak in UFC Heavyweight division history (7)
  - Tied (Cain Velasquez & Alistair Overeem) for third most knockdowns landed in UFC Heavyweight division history (10)
  - Second most knockout losses in Zuffa, LLC (UFC, Pride, WEC, Strikeforce) history (10) (behind Alistair Overeem)
  - Tied (Amanda Nunes, Charles Oliveira and Anthony Johnson) for fifth most first-round finishes in UFC history (9)
  - Fourth most losses in UFC history (18)
  - UFC.com Awards
    - 2005: Ranked #4 Submission of the Year vs. Tim Sylvia & Ranked #3 Knockout of the Year vs. Paul Buentello
    - 2006: Ranked #4 Fight of the Year vs. Tim Sylvia 1
    - 2015: Ranked #7 Knockout of the Year vs. Travis Browne, Ranked #4 Fight of the Year vs. Travis Browne & Half-Year Awards: Best Fight of the 1HY vs. Travis Browne
- Combat Press
  - 2015 Comeback Fighter of the Year
- MMA Junkie
  - 2015 May Fight of the Month vs. Travis Browne
- Sherdog
  - 2015 Round of the Year vs. Travis Browne, round 1

=== Bare Knuckle Boxing ===
- Bare Knuckle Fighting Championship
  - BKFC Heavyweight Championship (One time, current)
    - Oldest fighter in history to win a BKFC Championship (47 years, 3 days)

=== Sambo ===
- European Youth Sambo
  - European Youth Sambo Champion
- World Cup
  - 2nd place in the World Cup in Sambo
- World Sambo Championship
  - 2nd place at the World Sambo Championship

== Mixed martial arts record ==
Professional record breakdown
60 matches	34 wins	24 losses
By knockout	17	12
By submission	3	3
By decision	14	9
No contests	2	

Res.	Record	Opponent	Method	Event	Date	Round	Time	Location	Notes
Loss	34–24 (2)	Martin Buday	Decision (split)	UFC 303	29 June 2024	3	5:00	Las Vegas, Nevada, United States	
Loss	34–23 (2)	Waldo Cortes-Acosta	Decision (unanimous)	UFC Fight Night: Ankalaev vs. Walker 2	13 January 2024	3	5:00	Las Vegas, Nevada, United States	
Loss	34–22 (2)	Don'Tale Mayes	TKO (punches)	UFC on ESPN: Kara-France vs. Albazi	3 June 2023	2	3:17	Las Vegas, Nevada, United States	
Loss	34–21 (2)	Marcos Rogério de Lima	Submission (rear-naked choke)	UFC Fight Night: Kattar vs. Allen	29 October 2022	1	1:50	Las Vegas, Nevada, United States	
Win	34–20 (2)	Jake Collier	Decision (split)	UFC on ESPN: Font vs. Vera	30 April 2022	3	5:00	Las Vegas, Nevada, United States	
Win	33–20 (2)	Jared Vanderaa	Decision (split)	UFC 271	12 February 2022	3	5:00	Houston, Texas, United States	
Win	32–20 (2)	Carlos Felipe	Decision (unanimous)	UFC Fight Night: Ladd vs. Dumont	16 October 2021	3	5:00	Las Vegas, Nevada, United States	Felipe tested positive for Boldenone.
Win	31–20 (2)	Chase Sherman	Decision (unanimous)	UFC on ESPN: Whittaker vs. Gastelum	17 April 2021	3	5:00	Las Vegas, Nevada, United States	
Loss	30–20 (2)	Tom Aspinall	Submission (rear-naked choke)	UFC Fight Night: Blaydes vs. Lewis	20 February 2021	2	1:09	Las Vegas, Nevada, United States	
Win	30–19 (2)	Tanner Boser	Decision (unanimous)	UFC on ESPN: Santos vs. Teixeira	7 November 2020	3	5:00	Las Vegas, Nevada, United States	
Win	29–19 (2)	Philipe Lins	Decision (unanimous)	UFC Fight Night: Smith vs. Teixeira	13 May 2020	3	5:00	Jacksonville, Florida, United States	
Loss	28–19 (2)	Jairzinho Rozenstruik	KO (punch)	UFC 244	2 November 2019	1	0:29	New York City, New York, United States	
Win	28–18 (2)	Ben Rothwell	Decision (unanimous)	UFC on ESPN: dos Anjos vs. Edwards	20 July 2019	3	5:00	San Antonio, Texas, United States	
Loss	27–18 (2)	Augusto Sakai	Decision (split)	UFC Fight Night: Jacaré vs. Hermansson	27 April 2019	3	5:00	Sunrise, Florida, United States	
NC	27–17 (2)	Walt Harris	NC (overturned)	UFC 232	29 December 2018	3	5:00	Inglewood, California, United States	Originally a split decision win for Harris; overturned after he tested positive for LGD-4033.
Loss	27–17 (1)	Shamil Abdurakhimov	Decision (unanimous)	UFC Fight Night: Hunt vs. Oleinik	15 September 2018	3	5:00	Moscow, Russia	
Loss	27–16 (1)	Tai Tuivasa	Decision (unanimous)	UFC 225	9 June 2018	3	5:00	Chicago, Illinois, United States	
Win	27–15 (1)	Stefan Struve	Decision (unanimous)	UFC 222	3 March 2018	3	5:00	Las Vegas, Nevada, United States	
Win	26–15 (1)	Júnior Albini	Decision (unanimous)	UFC Fight Night: Poirier vs. Pettis	11 November 2017	3	5:00	Norfolk, Virginia, United States	
Loss	25–15 (1)	Marcin Tybura	Decision (unanimous)	UFC Fight Night: Holm vs. Correia	17 June 2017	3	5:00	Kallang, Singapore	
Loss	25–14 (1)	Francis Ngannou	TKO (punches)	UFC on Fox: Shevchenko vs. Peña	28 January 2017	1	1:32	Denver, Colorado, United States	
Loss	25–13 (1)	Josh Barnett	Submission (rear-naked choke)	UFC Fight Night: Arlovski vs. Barnett	3 September 2016	3	2:53	Hamburg, Germany	Fight of the Night.
Loss	25–12 (1)	Alistair Overeem	TKO (front kick and punches)	UFC Fight Night: Overeem vs. Arlovski	8 May 2016	2	1:12	Rotterdam, Netherlands	
Loss	25–11 (1)	Stipe Miocic	TKO (punches)	UFC 195	2 January 2016	1	0:54	Las Vegas, Nevada, United States	UFC heavyweight title eliminator
Win	25–10 (1)	Frank Mir	Decision (unanimous)	UFC 191	5 September 2015	3	5:00	Las Vegas, Nevada, United States	
Win	24–10 (1)	Travis Browne	TKO (punches)	UFC 187	23 May 2015	1	4:41	Las Vegas, Nevada, United States	Fight of the Night.
Win	23–10 (1)	Antônio Silva	KO (punches)	UFC Fight Night: Bigfoot vs. Arlovski	13 September 2014	1	2:59	Brasília, Brazil	Performance of the Night.
Win	22–10 (1)	Brendan Schaub	Decision (split)	UFC 174	14 June 2014	3	5:00	Vancouver, British Columbia, Canada	
Win	21–10 (1)	Andreas Kraniotakes	TKO (punches)	Fight Nights: Battle on Nyamiha	29 November 2013	2	3:14	Minsk, Belarus	
Win	20–10 (1)	Mike Kyle	Decision (unanimous)	WSOF 5	14 September 2013	3	5:00	Atlantic City, New Jersey, United States	
Loss	19–10 (1)	Anthony Johnson	Decision (unanimous)	WSOF 2	23 March 2013	3	5:00	Atlantic City, New Jersey, United States	
Win	19–9 (1)	Mike Hayes	Decision (unanimous)	Fight Nights: Battle of Moscow 9	16 December 2012	3	5:00	Moscow, Russia	
Win	18–9 (1)	Devin Cole	TKO (punches)	WSOF 1	3 November 2012	1	2:37	Las Vegas, Nevada, United States	
NC	17–9 (1)	Tim Sylvia	NC (illegal soccer kicks)	ONE FC: Pride of a Nation	31 August 2012	2	4:46	Quezon City, Philippines	Illegal soccer kicks rendered Sylvia unable to continue.
Win	17–9	Travis Fulton	KO (head kick)	ProElite 2	5 November 2011	3	4:59	Moline, Illinois, United States	
Win	16–9	Ray Lopez	TKO (punches)	ProElite 1	27 August 2011	3	2:43	Honolulu, Hawaii, United States	
Loss	15–9	Sergei Kharitonov	KO (punches)	Strikeforce: Fedor vs. Silva	12 February 2011	1	2:49	East Rutherford, New Jersey, United States	
Loss	15–8	Antônio Silva	Decision (unanimous)	Strikeforce: Heavy Artillery	15 May 2010	3	5:00	St. Louis, Missouri, United States	
Loss	15–7	Brett Rogers	TKO (punches)	Strikeforce: Lawler vs. Shields	6 June 2009	1	0:22	St. Louis, Missouri, United States	
Loss	15–6	Fedor Emelianenko	KO (punch)	Affliction: Day of Reckoning	24 January 2009	1	3:14	Anaheim, California, United States	For the WAMMA Heavyweight Championship.
Win	15–5	Roy Nelson	KO (punch)	EliteXC: Heat	4 October 2008	2	1:46	Sunrise, Florida, United States	
Win	14–5	Ben Rothwell	KO (punches)	Affliction: Banned	19 July 2008	3	1:13	Anaheim, California, United States	
Win	13–5	Jake O'Brien	TKO (punches)	UFC 82	1 March 2008	2	4:17	Columbus, Ohio, United States	
Win	12–5	Fabrício Werdum	Decision (unanimous)	UFC 70	21 April 2007	3	5:00	Manchester, England	
Win	11–5	Márcio Cruz	KO (punches)	UFC 66	30 December 2006	1	3:15	Las Vegas, Nevada, United States	
Loss	10–5	Tim Sylvia	Decision (unanimous)	UFC 61	8 July 2006	5	5:00	Las Vegas, Nevada, United States	For the UFC Heavyweight Championship.
Loss	10–4	Tim Sylvia	TKO (punches)	UFC 59	15 April 2006	1	2:43	Anaheim, California, United States	Lost the UFC Heavyweight Championship.
Win	10–3	Paul Buentello	KO (punch)	UFC 55	7 October 2005	1	0:15	Uncasville, Connecticut, United States	Defended the UFC Heavyweight Championship.
Win	9–3	Justin Eilers	TKO (punches)	UFC 53	4 June 2005	1	4:10	Atlantic City, New Jersey, United States	Defended the interim UFC Heavyweight Championship. Arlovski was promoted to undisputed champion on 12 August 2005.
Win	8–3	Tim Sylvia	Submission (achilles lock)	UFC 51	5 February 2005	1	0:47	Las Vegas, Nevada, United States	Won the interim UFC Heavyweight Championship.
Win	7–3	Wesley Correira	TKO (punches)	UFC 47	2 April 2004	2	1:15	Las Vegas, Nevada, United States	
Win	6–3	Vladimir Matyushenko	KO (punch)	UFC 44	26 September 2003	1	2:10	Las Vegas, Nevada, United States	
Win	5–3	Ian Freeman	KO (punches)	UFC 40	22 November 2002	1	1:25	Las Vegas, Nevada, United States	
Loss	4–3	Pedro Rizzo	KO (punches)	UFC 36	22 March 2002	3	1:45	Las Vegas, Nevada, United States	
Loss	4–2	Ricco Rodriguez	TKO (punches)	UFC 32	29 June 2001	3	1:23	East Rutherford, New Jersey, United States	
Win	4–1	Aaron Brink	Submission (armbar)	UFC 28	17 November 2000	1	0:55	Atlantic City, New Jersey, United States	
Win	3–1	John Dixson	KO (punches)	Super Fight at International Tournament	13 May 2000	1	0:13	Minsk, Belarus	
Win	2–1	Roman Zentsov	TKO (punches)	M-1: European Championship 2000	9 April 2000	1	1:18	Saint Petersburg, Russia	Won the 2000 M-1 European Heavyweight Tournament.
Win	1–1	Michael Tielrooy	Submission (guillotine choke)	M-1: European Championship 2000	9 April 2000	1	1:25	Saint Petersburg, Russia	2000 M-1 European Heavyweight Tournament Quarterfinal.
Loss	0–1	Viacheslav Datsik	KO (punch)	M-1: World Championship 1999	9 April 1999	1	6:05	Saint Petersburg, Russia	Heavyweight debut. 1999 M-1 Heavyweight Tournament Quarterfinal.

== MF–Professional boxing record ==
1 fight	1 win	0 losses
By knockout	1	0

No.	Result	Record	Opponent	Type	Round, time	Date	Location	Notes
1	Win	1–0	Kelz	KO	4 (4), 1:10	9 Nov 2025	Nashville Municipal Auditorium, Nashville, Tennessee, U.S.	

== Bare-knuckle boxing record ==
Professional record breakdown
2 matches	2 wins	0 losses
By knockout	2	0
By decision	0	0

Res.	Record	Opponent	Method	Event	Date	Round	Time	Location	Notes
Win	2–0	Ben Rothwell	TKO (doctor stoppage)	BKFC Knucklemania VI	7 February 2026	3	1:14	Philadelphia, Pennsylvania, United States	Won the BKFC Heavyweight Championship.
Win	1–0	Josh Copeland	TKO	BKFC 76	21 June 2025	4	2:00	Fort Worth, Texas, United States	

== Dirty boxing record ==
Professional record breakdown
1 match	1 win	0 losses
By knockout	1	0
By decision	0	0

Res.	Record	Opponent	Method	Event	Date	Round	Time	Location	Notes
Win	1–0	Terrance Hodges	TKO (referee stoppage)	Dirty Boxing DBX 1	22 March 2025	2	1:00	Miami, Florida, United States	

== Pay-per-view bouts ==
No.	Fight	Event	Date	City	Venue	PPV Buys
1.	Arlovski vs. Eilers	UFC 53	4 June 2005	Atlantic City, New Jersey, United States	Boardwalk Hall	90,000
2.	Arlovski vs. Buentello	UFC 55	7 October 2005	Atlantic City, New Jersey, United States	Boardwalk Hall	125,000
3.	Arlovski vs. Sylvia 2	UFC 59	15 April 2006	Anaheim, California, United States	Arrowhead Pond	425,000
4.	Sylvia vs. Arlovski 3	UFC 61	8 July 2006	Las Vegas, Nevada, United States	Mandalay Bay Events Center	775,000
5.	Emelianenko vs. Arlovski	Affliction: Day of Reckoning	24 January 2009	Anaheim, California, United States	Honda Center	175,000

== See also ==
- List of male boxers
- List of male mixed martial artists
- List of mixed martial artists with professional boxing records
- List of multi-sport athletes
- List of multi-sport champions

Achievements
New title	1st UFC Interim Heavyweight Champion; 5 February 2005 – 12 August 2005 promoted to UFC Heavyweight Champion	Vacant Title next held by Antônio Rodrigo Nogueira
Vacant Title last held by Frank Mir	11th UFC Heavyweight Champion; 12 August 2005 – 15 April 2006	Succeeded by Tim Sylvia
Preceded by Ben Rothwell	8th BKFC Heavyweight Champion; 7 February 2026 – present	Incumbent
