= Viacheslav Datsik =

Russian mixed martial artist

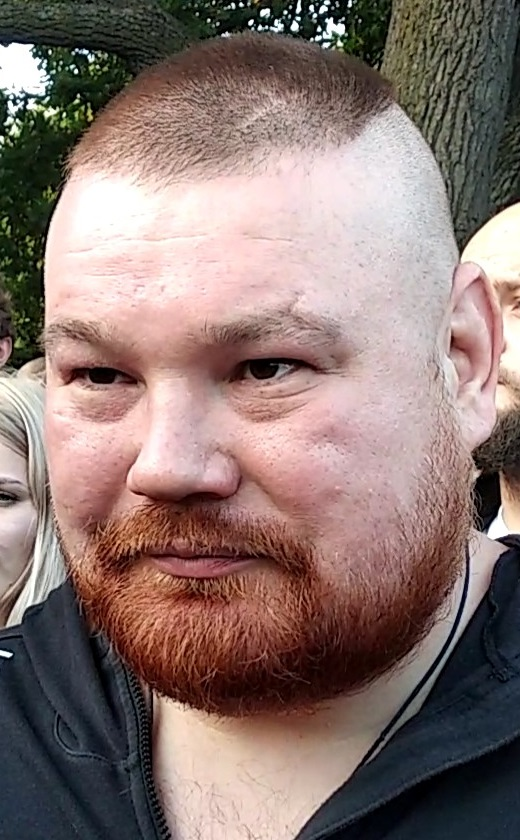
- Born: 13 February 1980 (age 46); Slantsy, Russian SFSR, USSR
- Native name: Вячеслав Валерьевич Дацик
- Other names: Red-Haired Tarzan (Рыжий Тарзан)
- Height: 1.85 m (6 ft 1 in)
- Weight: 150 kg (331 lb; 23 st 9 lb)
- Division: Heavyweight
- Reach: 192 cm (76 in)
- Style: Kickboxing
- Fighting out of: St. Petersburg, Russia

Professional boxing record
- Total: 9
- Wins: 6
- By knockout: 4
- Losses: 3
- By knockout: 2

Kickboxing record
- Total: 9
- Wins: 7
- By knockout: 5
- Losses: 2
- By knockout: 1

Mixed martial arts record
- Total: 33
- Wins: 14
- By knockout: 5
- By submission: 5
- By decision: 2
- Unknown: 2
- Losses: 19
- By knockout: 8
- By submission: 2
- By decision: 5
- By disqualification: 2
- Unknown: 2

Other information
- Boxing record from BoxRec
- Mixed martial arts record from Sherdog

Viacheslav Valerievich Datsik (Russian: Вячесла́в Вале́рьевич Да́цик, IPA: [vʲɪtɕɪˈslav ˈdatsɨk]; born 13 February 1980), also known as Red Tarzan and Red-Haired Tarzan, is a Russian professional boxer, kickboxer, and mixed martial artist.

Datsik has fought professionally in his native Russia since 1999, accumulating a record of 14–19 in mixed martial arts. Datsik gained notoriety both for his criminal behavior and vigilante raids on brothels, as well as his white supremacist and neo-Nazi beliefs.

== Martial arts career ==
Datsik attained some degree of fame in the mixed martial arts community, due mostly to his dramatic knockout of future Ultimate Fighting Championship heavyweight champion Andrei Arlovski at the MFC World Championship on 9 April 1999, and, in part, to his wild fighting style and notorious in-ring antics. Another notable fight was in a Pankration bout in 2001, when Datsik faced Vitali Shkraba. During the fight he poked Shkraba in the eye, which resulted in a disqualification.

== Imprisonment ==
After losing six straight fights between December 2001 and February 2003, Datsik pursued a career in kickboxing and appeared in his last fight for almost a decade on 23 August 2006. He later seemingly disappeared completely, leading to widespread rumors that he had died in a train wreck. These rumors, however, were set to rest when it was reported in March 2007 that he was alive and well after being detained for his part in the armed robbery of various mobile phone shops in St. Petersburg.

Datsik was sympathetic to the Slavic Union white supremacist organization. He reportedly had obsessive antisemitic and anti-Christian views, while exalting Slavic paganism. The official expert analysis on his mental sanity asserted that he claimed Jesus Christ was a Mossad agent, whereas Datsik believed himself to be "Red Tarzan," the son of Slavic god Perun. In the analysis, he was concluded to have schizophrenia and avoided criminal charges. He was first locked in a high-security mental institution for therapy, but he was transferred to a low-security psychiatric clinic in July 2010.

== Escape and deportation ==
In August 2010 he escaped by tearing a hole in the wire fence around the low-security clinic, apparently using his bare hands. He then illegally crossed the border to Norway in a boat and met with Norwegian reporters. While wearing Nazi symbols, he told the reporters that he was "not a nationalist, but a racist". Joined by two neo-Nazis from "an ex-Soviet Baltic state" living in Norway, he appeared at the International Police Immigration Service in Oslo on 21 September 2010, where he handed in a loaded weapon, declared himself a "white warrior", and requested political asylum. As a result, the police searched their tattoo shop, where they found five illegal handguns and an entrance card stolen from the Norwegian Armed Forces. Nazi paraphernalia, including a large doll dressed up as a Nazi, was found near the front entrance of the shop. The newspaper interviewed residents near the tattoo shop who claimed they "often heard loud noise, screaming and banging". The neighbors also stated they would occasionally see the occupants of the tattoo shop "practicing fighting and boxing while completely naked". All three were then jailed, while the case was being investigated. On 18 October, Russian authorities sent an extradition request to Norwegian authorities.

In the week of 29 October, a Norwegian police physician submitted a report based on conversations with Datsik and review of available documents, which concluded that he did not have a serious mental disease. Datsik's lawyers are of the opinion that Political abuse of psychiatry in the Soviet Union and Norwegian authorities on that ground must allow Datsik to remain in Norway. Datsik also claimed that he was tortured by Russian authorities. The torture included the application of electrodes to his genitals and placing him in an iron cage for eight months, naked and handcuffed. He had twice attempted suicide in Norwegian detainment due to being isolated from the other prisoners, but he was again isolated after shouting racist remarks from his cell window. Datsik had been placed in solitary confinement for four weeks despite the court's order being limited to one week. Norwegian police blamed capacity issues for this. The Norwegian newspaper Dagbladet wrote that Datsik had allegedly told the police that he wants his girlfriend to come to Norway for family reunification.

He asked the court to give him the maximum sentence, as he said that it would help him live a healthier life, while announcing that he was "too raw for humanity". He told the Norwegian media that he wanted to compete in mixed martial arts under the flag of Norway. Russia has sought the extradition of Datsik. On 22 December 2010, a demonstration was held by his followers in Oslo. Viacheslav Datsik was deported from Norway on 18 March 2011.

== Brothel raids ==
Following his release from custody, Datsik began a series of vigilante raids on brothels.

== Release ==
Datsik was released from custody in 2016. He had been imprisoned for nine years, apart from a one-month stint of freedom, following his escape.

== Personal life ==
Datsik is father to two children from a former relationship with Xenia Efimova.

== Mixed martial arts record ==
=== Professional ===
Professional record breakdown
32 matches	14 wins	18 losses
By knockout	5	8
By submission	6	2
By decision	1	4
By disqualification	0	2
Unknown	2	2

Res.	Record	Opponent	Method	Event	Date	Round	Time	Location	Notes
Loss	14–18	Artem Tarasov	DQ	Fight for Hype 2	15 April 2019	3	2:04	Moscow, Russia	
Win	14–17	Andrey Kirsanov	Submission (armbar)	Fight Night 2	23 August 2006	2	N/A	Belorechensk, Krasnodar Krai	
Win	13–17	Roman Savochka	TKO (punches)	Crystal Ring Cup 2	31 May 2006	3	N/A	Moscow, Russia	
Win	12–17	Stanislav Nuschik	Submission (heel hook)	Ultimate Combat Russia (−90 kg)	19 May 2005	1	0:44	Moscow, Russia	
Win	11–17	Denis Sobolev	Submission (rear-naked choke)	Cup of Empire 2004	17 May 2004	1	N/A	Moscow, Russia	
Loss	10–17	Sergei Gur	TKO (doctor stoppage)	BARS: Cup of Arbat Quarter-finals (+94 kg)	5 February 2003	2	N/A	Moscow, Russia	
Loss	10–16	Zurab Akhmedov	Decision (unanimous)	BARS: Cup of Arbat Final (−71 kg)	23 January 2003	3	5:00	Moscow, Russia	
Loss	10–15	Eduard Voznovich	Decision (unanimous)	BARS	25 December 2002	3	5:00	Moscow, Russia	
Loss	10–14	Roman Sukoterin	Decision (unanimous)	BARS	30 October 2002	3	5:00	Moscow, Russia	
Loss	10–13	Vitali Akhramenko	KO/TKO	BARS	16 October 2002	N/A	N/A	Moscow, Russia	
Win	10–12	Murad Musaev	KO/TKO	BARS	9 October 2002	N/A	N/A	Moscow, Russia	
Loss	9–12	Andrey Kindrich	Decision (unanimous)	BARS	7 August 2002	3	5:00	Moscow, Russia	
Win	9–11	Sergey Danish	Decision	Honour of Warriors 2002	1 August 2002	3	3:00	Kyiv, Ukraine	
Win	8–11	Vasily Gorbonos	N/A	BARS	2 July 2002	N/A	N/A	Moscow, Russia	
Win	7–11	Vladimir Marinin	N/A	Pankration Eurasian Championship 2001	8 December 2001	N/A	N/A	Moscow, Russia	
Loss	6–11	Timur Porsukov	N/A	BARS: End of Years Special 2001	27 December 2001	N/A	N/A	Moscow, Russia	
Loss	6–10	Romazi Korkelia	TKO (punches)	Pankration Eurasian Championship 2001	8 December 2001	1	N/A	Moscow, Russia	
Win	6–9	Eldanis Safarov	KO (punch)	BARS	1 December 2001	1	N/A	Moscow, Russia	
Loss	5–9	Gela Getsadze	N/A	BARS	22 November 2001	N/A	N/A	Moscow, Russia	
Loss	5–8	Roman Savochka	TKO (doctor stoppage)	IAFC: Mega-Sphere Cup 1	3 August 2001	1	1:40	Moscow, Russia	
Loss	5–7	Roman Savochka	Submission (rear-naked choke)	IAFC: Mega-Sphere Cup 1	3 August 2001	1	1:40	Moscow, Russia	
Loss	5–6	Alseldar Abdulkhamidov	TKO (punches)	IAFC	1 July 2001	1	N/A	Makhachkala, Russia	
Win	5–5	Patrick de Witte	Submission (rear-naked choke)	M-1 MFC – Russia vs. the World 1	27 April 2001	1	0:30	Moscow, Russia	
Win	4–5	Vitaly Martushov	Submission (guillotine choke)	M-1 MFC: Exclusive Fight Night 1	25 February 2001	1	N/A	Saint Petersburg, Russia	
Loss	3–5	Vitali Shkraba	DQ (eye gouging)	Pankration Russian Championship 2001	8 February 2001	1	3:05	Moscow, Russia	
Win	3–4	Andrey Budnik	TKO (punch)	Pankration World Championship 2000	28 April 2000	1	2:13	Moscow, Russia	
Loss	2–4	Ramazan Mezhidov	KO (punch)	IAFC Russian Championship 2000	9 April 2000	N/A	N/A	Moscow, Russia	
Loss	2–3	Magomed Dzhabrailov	TKO (doctor stoppage)	IAFC Russian Championship 2000	9 April 2000	1	N/A	Saint Petersburg, Russia	
Loss	2–2	Vadim Kuvatov	TKO (punches)	M-1 MFC: Russia Open Tournament	5 December 1999	1	N/A	Saint Petersburg, Russia	
Win	2–1	Stanislav Nuschik	Submission (heel hook)	M-1 MFC: Russia Open Tournament	5 December 1999	1	N/A	Saint Petersburg, Russia	
Loss	1–1	Martin Malkhasyan	Submission (rear-naked choke)	M-1 MFC – World Championship 1999	9 April 1999	1	0:57	Moscow, Russia	
Win	1–0	Andrei Arlovski	KO (punch)	M-1 MFC – World Championship 1999	9 April 1999	1	6:07	Saint Petersburg, Russia	

- Record confirmed through Tapology.com Sherdog.com and FightLife.ru

=== Exhibition ===
Amateur record breakdown		
2 matches	1 win	1 loss
By decision	1	1

Res.	Record	Opponent	Method	Event	Date	Round	Time	Location	Notes
Loss	1–1	Galymzhan Zhaslanov	Decision (unanimous)	Naiza FC 52 & Ural FC 53	23 June 2023	3	5:00	Almaty, Kazakhstan	
Win	1–0	Jeff Monson	Decision (unanimous)	Arta MMA: Battle For Ryzan	August 8, 2022	3	5:00	Moscow, Russia	

== Professional boxing record ==
10 fights	6 wins	4 losses
By knockout	4	2
By decision	2	2

No.	Result	Record	Opponent	Type	Round, time	Date	Location	Notes
9	Loss	5–4	(United States) Kevin Johnson	SD	3	31 March 2023	Moscow, Russia	
8	Win	5–3	(Russia) Alexander Emelianenko	KO	1 (4)	25 September 2022	CSKA Arena, Moscow, Russia	
7	Loss	4–3	(Uzbekistan) Islam Karimov	TKO	2 (4)	13 August 2022	CSKA Arena, Moscow, Russia	
6	Win	4–2	(Brazil) Antônio Silva	TKO	1 (4)	8 July 2022	CSKA Arena, Moscow, Russia	
5	Win	3–2	(Brazil) Saulo Cavalari	TKO	1 (6)	15 April 2022	Concert Hall Mir, Moscow, Russia	
4	Loss	2–2	(Russia) Zelimkhan Dukaev	UD	3	28 January 2022	Moscow, Russia	
3	Win	2–1	(Cameroon) Tyson Djone	UD	3	10 June 2021	Noginsk, Russia	
2	Loss	1–1	(Russia) Gadzhi Navruzov	RTD	1 (3)	5 May 2021	Moscow, Russia	
1	Win	1–0	(Cameroon) Tyson Djone	TKO	4 (6)	20 February 2021	Vegas City Hall, Krasnogorsk, Russia	

== Modified rules record ==
Res.	Record	Opponent	Method	Event	Date	Round	Time	Location	Notes
Loss	2–2	(Belarus) Petr Romankevich	KO	REN TV Superfight Series	28 October 2023	2		Moscow, Russia	Cage boxing.
Win	2–1	(Russia) Pavel Shulsky	Decision (unanimous)	REN TV Superfight Series	16 December 2022	3	2:00	Moscow, Russia	Cage boxing.
Loss	1–1	(Russia) Ilyas Yakubov	Decision (unanimous)	Nashe Delo 71	12 December 2022	3	2:00	Moscow, Russia	Cage boxing.
Win	1–0	(Georgia (country)) Revaz Verulashvili	TKO (corner stoppage)	Nashe Delo 43	27 October 2021	2	0:58	Moscow, Russia	Cage boxing.
