= Affliction: Day of Reckoning =

Affliction Entertainment MMA event in 2009

- The poster for Affliction: Day of Reckoning
- Promotion: Affliction Entertainment
- Date: January 24, 2009
- Venue: Honda Center
- City: Anaheim, California, United States
- Attendance: 13,255
- Total gate: $1,512,750
- Buyrate: 175,000

Affliction: Day of Reckoning was a mixed martial arts event promoted by Affliction Entertainment on January 24, 2009, in Anaheim, California at the Honda Center. It was originally scheduled for October 11, 2008, at the Thomas and Mack Center in Las Vegas, Nevada with a different fight card.

== Background ==
The main event was former Pride World Heavyweight Champion Fedor Emelianenko against former UFC Heavyweight Champion Andrei Arlovski.

Also on the card was Josh "Babyface Assassin" Barnett, who took on Gilbert Yvel. In a light-heavyweight match, former Strikeforce Champion Renato "Babalu" Sobral took on Rameau Thierry Sokoudjou. Matt Lindland was reassigned from a 195-pound catchweight bout with Sobral to a middleweight matchup against former UFC Light-Heavyweight Champion Vitor Belfort.

Headlining the undercard, which was broadcast on HDNet Fights, was the last IFL Light-Heavyweight Champion Vladimir Matyushenko against PRIDE veteran Antônio Rogério Nogueira.

After the event, more than half of the fighters received medical suspensions by the CSAC.

== Results ==
Main card
Weight class				Method	Round	Time	Notes
Heavyweight	Fedor Emelianenko	def	Andrei Arlovski	KO (punch)	1	3:14
Welterweight	Jay Hieron	def	Jason High	KO (punches)	1	1:04
Heavyweight	Josh Barnett	def	Gilbert Yvel	TKO (submission to punches)	3	3:05
Middleweight	Vitor Belfort	def	Matt Lindland	KO (punches)	1	0:37
Light Heavyweight	Renato Sobral	def	Rameau Thierry Sokoudjou	Submission (D'arce choke)	2	2:37
Heavyweight	Paul Buentello	def	Kirill Sidelnikov	TKO (doctor stoppage)	3	4:18
Lightweight	Dan Lauzon	def	Bobby Green	Submission (rear-naked choke)	1	4:55
HDNet matches / undercard
Light Heavyweight	Antônio Rogério Nogueira	def	Vladimir Matyushenko	KO (knee)	2	4:26
Featherweight	LC Davis	def	Bao Quach	Decision (unanimous) (29-28, 29-28, 29-28)	3	5:00
Featherweight	Albert Rios	def	Antonio Duarte	Decision (unanimous) (29-28, 29-28, 29-28)	3	5:00
Welterweight	Brett Cooper	def	Patrick Speight	KO (punches)	2	4:10

== Fighter salaries ==
The total payroll for the event that was disclosed to the California State Athletic Commission (CSAC) was $3,318,660. That total is based on the reported to the CSAC and do not reflect entire compensation packages for the event. It does not include deductions for insurance, licenses, and taxes; nor does it include money paid by sponsors or any other special bonuses the organization may have paid the fighters. Arlovski reportedly was paid well over a million dollars.

Fedor Emelianenko ($300,000 with no win bonus) def. Andrei Arlovski ($1,500,000)

Josh Barnett ($500,000 with no win bonus) def. Gilbert Yvel ($30,000)

Vitor Belfort ($200,000 including $80,000 win bonus) def. Matt Lindland ($225,000)

Renato "Babalu" Sobral ($90,000 including $30,000 win bonus) def. Rameau Thierry Sokoudjou ($50,000)

Paul Buentello ($90,000 including $20,000 win bonus) def. Kiril Sidelnikov ($10,000)

Dan Lauzon ($23,160 including $11,160 win bonus) def. Bobby Green ($4,000)

Jay Hieron ($45,000 including $25,000 win bonus) def. Jason High ($10,000)

Antônio Rogério Nogueira ($150,000 including $30,000 win bonus) def. Vladimir Matyushenko ($50,000)

L.C. Davis ($13,500 including $6,500 win bonus) def. Bao Quach ($7,000)

Albert Rios ($6,000 including $3,000 win bonus) def. Antonio Duarte ($3,000)

Brett Cooper ($10,000 including $5,000 win bonus) def. Patrick Speight ($2,000)

== Yvel controversy ==
Gilbert Yvel was signed after Aleksander Emelianenko was unable to be licensed in time. A hearing by the CSAC was scheduled as to whether to permit Yvel to fight at the event. Yvel was not cleared to fight until he met privately with CSAC Assistant Executive Officer Bill Douglas and Chief Athletic Inspector Dean Lohuis to determine whether he will be licensed to compete. The CSAC cleared Yvel to fight and granted him a license to compete against Barnett three days before the event.

== Lineup changes ==
At one point, there were rumors that the event would be a co-promotion with renowned boxing promotion Golden Boy Promotions that would feature both boxing and MMA matches. Those plans were changed, however, according to Affliction vice-president Tom Atencio.

Originally scheduled for October 11, 2008, the main event was to have been Andrei Arlovski against Fedor Emelianenko, but Fedor had to pull out due to a hand injury. Affliction then announced that the main event was to feature a bout between two former UFC heavyweight champions, Andrei Arlovski and Josh Barnett. When it was announced that the event would take place on its current date, January 24, 2009, it was also confirmed that the event would feature the original heavyweight match between Emelianenko and Arlovski.

Matt Lindland was scheduled to face former UFC light-heavyweight champion Vitor Belfort on the October 11 card, but a hand injury forced Belfort to withdraw from the fight. Renato Sobral was initially scheduled as Belfort's replacement, until Lindland's reassignment to again fight Belfort.

Bao Quach replaced Mark Hominick on the undercard. Hominick could not fight due to a case of pneumonia. Chris Horodecki did not receive medical clearance for this fight, and was removed from the card. Horodecki had a bulging disc in his neck, costing him about 80% of his strength in his right arm. Affliction replaced Horodecki with Bobby Green.
