= Josh Barnett =

American mixed martial artist and professional wrestler

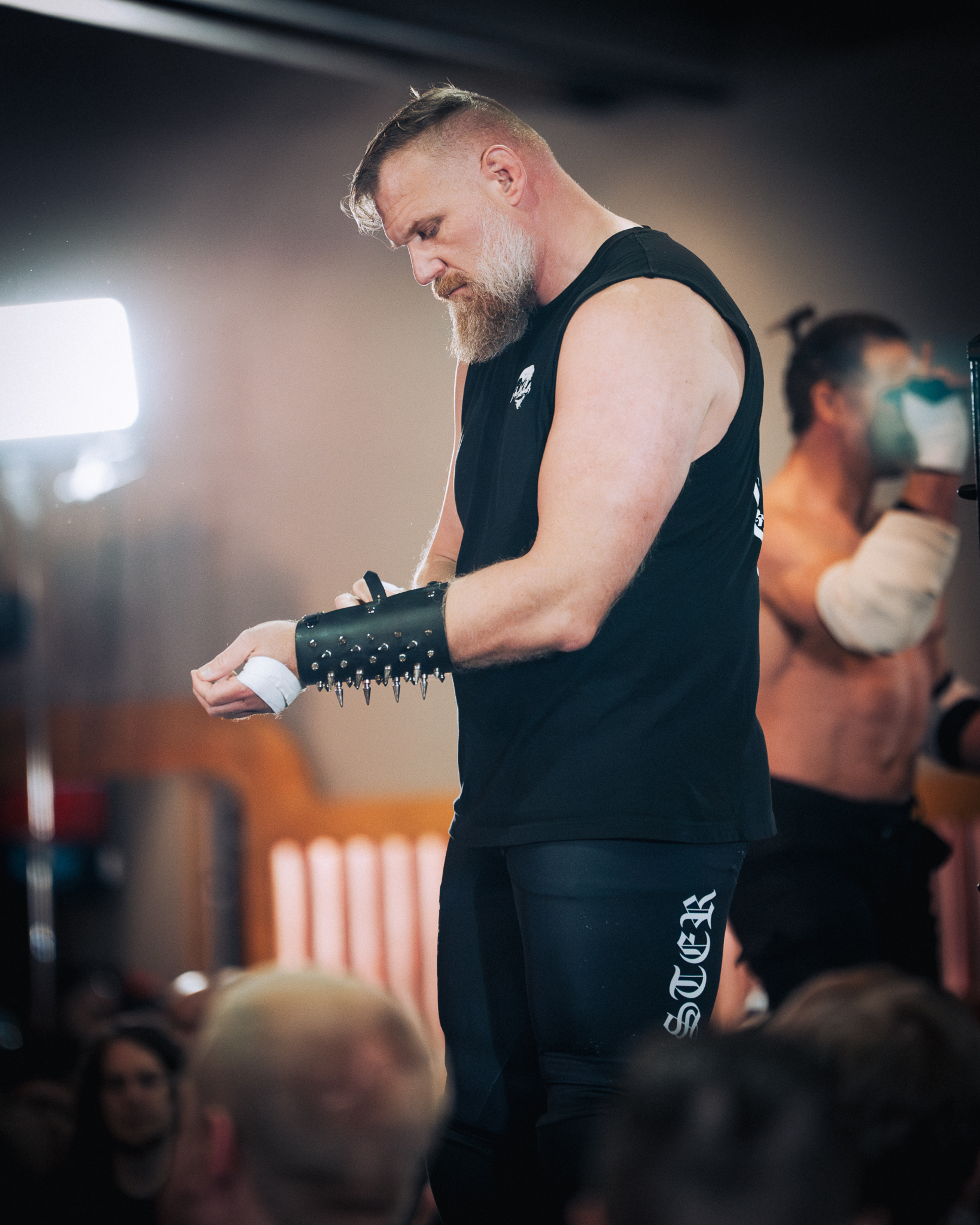
- Barnett in 2024
- Born: Joshua Lawrence Barnett; November 10, 1977 (age 49); Seattle, Washington, U.S.
- Other names: The Warmaster
- Height: 6 ft 3 in (191 cm)
- Weight: 248 lb (112 kg; 17 st 10 lb)
- Division: Heavyweight
- Reach: 78 in (198 cm)
- Style: Catch Wrestling
- Fighting out of: Fullerton, California, U.S.
- Team: UWF USA
- Trainer: Billy Robinson; Erik Paulson; Matt Hume; Haru Shimanishi; Jim Harrison
- Rank: 2nd degree black belt in Brazilian jiu-jitsu under Erik Paulson and Rigan Machado; Full Instructor in Combat Submission Wrestling under Erik Paulson; Certified Pancrase Hybrid Wrestling Instructor
- Years active: 1997–present (MMA)

Mixed martial arts record
- Total: 43
- Wins: 35
- By knockout: 10
- By submission: 19
- By decision: 5
- By disqualification: 1
- Losses: 8
- By knockout: 4
- By submission: 1
- By decision: 3

Other information
- Website: http://www.joshbarnett.com
- Mixed martial arts record from Sherdog
Medal record
Representing the United States
Submission grappling
IBJJF World No-Gi Championship
Gold medal – first place	2009 Long Beach	+97.5 kg (black belt)
Catch wrestling
Snake Pit World Championships
Gold medal – first place	2018 Bolton	+100 kg
- Last updated on: April 29, 2023

Joshua Lawrence Barnett (born November 10, 1977) is an American former mixed martial artist, submission wrestler, professional wrestler, and color commentator. Barnett previously competed for the Ultimate Fighting Championship (UFC), where he was the youngest-ever UFC Heavyweight Champion. Barnett was the final Openweight King Of Pancrase, a finalist in both the 2006 PRIDE Openweight Grand Prix and the 2012 Strikeforce Heavyweight Championship Grand Prix. He has also competed in Affliction, World Victory Road, DREAM and Impact FC.

Barnett is one of the most prominent modern-day catch wrestlers. He won an IBJJF no-gi jiu-jitsu world championship in 2009 - despite no formal jiu-jitsu training, the Metamoris Heavyweight Championship in 2014, and a Snake Pit Catch Wrestling World Championship in 2018.

As a professional wrestler, Barnett made his in-ring debut in 2003 in the main event of New Japan Pro-Wrestling's annual January 4 Tokyo Dome Show, in a bout against IWGP Heavyweight Champion Yuji Nagata. Since then he has also wrestled for Inoki Genome Federation and Total Nonstop Action Wrestling. In January 2015, Barnett began working as a color commentator for NJPW's weekly program on America's AXS TV.

== Early life ==
Born and raised in Seattle, Washington, Barnett had a troubled childhood and often got into fights. He was put into anger management programs at a young age and learned to cope with his anger by participating in athletics. Barnett attended Ballard High School, where he excelled at wrestling, football, and also trained in judo, karate and Muay Thai. After seeing UFC 2 as a sophomore, he decided that he wanted to be a mixed martial artist. Barnett had originally attended the University of Montana to play football for the school as a walk-on, but decided to pursue fighting instead. At the recommendation of an instructor at Montana, Barnett went to train at the Bushidokan dojo of Jim Harrison. Although he did not have the money for classes, he received training in exchange for helping with maintenance and labor at the dojo.

== Mixed martial arts career ==
=== Early career ===
Before his professional debut, Barnett engaged in mutual combat fights he organized with men via the internet. They would share information, arrange a location, agree upon rules, and use improvised gloves, often fighting several times as well as training together.

Barnett's professional debut was on January 11, 1997, in Washington, against Chris Charnos for United Full Contact Federation. He accepted the fight with less than two weeks notice while home for winter break after being contacted by organizer Matt Hume, his former high school wrestling coach, and won by submission via rear-naked choke in under three minutes. Barnett started training in catch wrestling and no-holds-barred with Hume's AMC Pankration team to prepare for his next fight. After winning, he decided to drop out of university and pursue fighting full-time. Barnett was required to pass an evaluation involving conditioning, training, and an interview to join AMC. He would compile a 9–0 record with seven first-round stoppages and wins over future UFC Hall of Famer Dan Severn, Bobby Hoffman, John Marsh, and Bob Gilstrap twice. With these dominant showings, Barnett was invited to compete in the UFC.

=== Ultimate Fighting Championship ===
Barnett made his UFC debut at UFC 28 on November 17, 2000, against 6' 10" Gan "The Giant" McGee and Barnett won via TKO in the second round. Despite suffering a KO loss in his next fight against Pedro Rizzo at UFC 30 he would bounce back and win his next two fights over 7' 0" Dutch kickboxer Semmy Schilt via armbar submission at UFC 32, and then received a submission win in a rematch with Bobby Hoffman at UFC 34. Subsequent to his win over Hoffman, Barnett tested positive for banned substances and was given a warning by the Nevada State Athletic Commission. Barnett was then given a title shot for the UFC Heavyweight Championship against then-champion and future UFC Hall of Famer Randy Couture at UFC 36. He won via TKO after using the ground and pound technique to become the youngest-ever UFC Heavyweight Champion. However, after the bout it was revealed that he had again tested positive for banned substances and his title was stripped.

=== Pancrase and PRIDE ===
Barnett competed in MMA in both PRIDE and Pancrase in Japan. While in Pancrase, he became the Openweight King of Pancrase by defeating Yuki Kondo. Winning this title put him alongside the likes of Ken Shamrock, Frank Shamrock and Bas Rutten as one of the few fighters to be a titleholder in both Pancrase and the UFC.

In his first fight in PRIDE, at PRIDE 28 against Croatian Mirko Cro Cop, he suffered a simultaneous fracture and dislocated shoulder injury that required surgery and over six months of rehab. His first fight back post-injury was a rematch against Cro Cop at PRIDE 30, which he lost by a unanimous decision. He came back with a win against Kazuhiro Nakamura at PRIDE 31. Josh Barnett was scheduled to fight Pride World Heavyweight Champion Fedor Emelianenko for the title but withdrew from the fight due to an appendicitis. Barnett underwent surgery to remove his appendix later that night.

Barnett later beat Alexander Emelianenko by an americana submission in the second round of the PRIDE Openweight Grand Prix at PRIDE Total Elimination Absolute. He submitted Mark Hunt via kimura in the first round of the Openweight Grand Prix at Pride Critical Countdown Absolute. Barnett defeated Antônio Rodrigo Nogueira by split decision in the semi-finals of the Openweight Grand Prix, however he lost the final match of the PRIDE Final Conflict Absolute to Cro Cop on September 10, 2006, submitting after an unintentional finger poke to the eye. In a post-fight interview, Barnett explained the incident: "I opened up my guard and I grabbed his leg to go for a leg lock, and in the scramble Mirko put his hand out to post and he caught a finger deep in my right eye. And as soon as it happened I let go of the leg and grabbed my face, and I couldn't see anything at the time and I had no idea where he was and I just didn't want him to punt me in the face with a kick when I can't see and I'm blinded. He said, you know, 'Sorry' and I said to him that he was winning that night and it was an accident. He didn't mean [to do it]". This also marked the third time he was beaten by the MMA legend.

Next, Barnett fought the Polish judo gold medalist Pawel Nastula at PRIDE 32, the organization's first show in the United States. To fight again in Nevada, the Nevada State Athletic Commission required that Barnett pass a mandatory drug test. In a surprisingly competitive match, Nastula controlled the first round and most of the second. Barnett reversed Nastula from the bottom and was able to secure a toe-hold submission, which earned him the victory. At a post-fight press conference, Barnett complimented Nastula on his performance. Nastula, however, subsequently tested positive for steroids. Barnett then lost a rematch by unanimous decision to Antônio Rodrigo Nogueira at Pride Shockwave 2006.

=== World Victory Road: Sengoku ===
After the bout against Nogueira and the acquisition of PRIDE by the UFC, Barnett did not participate in any MMA events in 2007. Barnett did not follow many other PRIDE veterans to the UFC because he desired to join an organization that included the top Heavyweight fighter in the world, Fedor Emelianenko. In 2008, Barnett joined the newly organized MMA promotion, Sengoku, and fought in consecutive main events at Sengoku 1 and Sengoku 2, submitting Hidehiko Yoshida with a heel hook in the third round, and defeating Jeff Monson by unanimous decision.

=== Affliction Entertainment ===
Since his contract with World Victory Road was not exclusive, Barnett was able to join other MMA events. Barnett participated in the inaugural MMA event held by Affliction Entertainment, in July 2008. Seven years after his only knockout loss to Pedro Rizzo, he avenged that loss at Affliction: Banned with a knockout of his own in the second round.

In January 2009, Barnett fought PRIDE veteran Gilbert Yvel at Affliction: Day of Reckoning. Barnett defeated Yvel by a submission resulting from strikes in the third round. His next match-up, scheduled on August 1, 2009, against Fedor Emelianenko at Affliction's 3rd event Affliction: Trilogy, was one of the most anticipated match-up between the then ranked number one Heavyweight Emelianenko and number two Heavyweight Barnett. Dana White announced if Barnett were to defeat Emelianenko, he would sign him back into the UFC and would grant him a title shot against UFC Heavyweight Champion Brock Lesnar. However, the fight was officially pulled 10 days before the fight by the California State Athletic Commission after Barnett tested positive for anabolic steroids (a metabolite of drostanolone) for a third time. The event and Affliction Entertainment itself was cancelled July 24, 2009, as a result. Barnett requested that they test his "B" sample hoping there was an error in the test. His "B" sample was also positive.

=== Post-Affliction ===
Due to the positive drug tests, Barnett made a re-licensure appeal to the California State Athletic Commission (CSAC). The CSAC postponed Barnett's appeal three times. The first two postponements occurred because Barnett's law firm required additional information from the laboratory that conducted Barnett's tests. Michael J. DiMaggio, Barnett's attorney, was unable to attend the hearing because of travel problems, causing the third extension, which would have taken place February 22, 2010.

Barnett was a no-show at his hearing on February 22, 2010, making this the fourth delay in his appeal. Shannon Hooper, Barnett's manager, told MMAjunkie.com that on Monday February 22, 2010, Barnett was in Japan on Sunday February 21, 2010, for a professional wrestling match and would return to the U.S. later that day. He claimed he was unaware that his presence was required, but the CSAC stated they had notified him of this months before. Barnett later signed on with MMA organization Strikeforce.

=== DREAM ===
Barnett signed to fight for DREAM in 2010, and made his debut on March 22, 2010, at DREAM 13 against Mighty Mo. He won the fight via submission in the first round. During the fight, he accidentally kicked Mighty Mo in the groin so immediately after winning the fight, Barnett approached Mighty Mo apologizing for the illegal strike and in return allowed Mighty Mo to knee him in the groin.

=== Strikeforce ===
On September 13, 2010, it was announced that Josh Barnett had signed a multi-fight deal with Strikeforce.

Barnett faced Brett Rogers on June 18, 2011, at Strikeforce: Overeem vs. Werdum in the opening round of a Strikeforce Heavyweight Tournament. Barnett submitted Rogers with an arm triangle choke in the second round of the bout.

Barnett defeated Sergei Kharitonov in the semi-final of the tournament headlining Strikeforce: Barnett vs. Kharitonov on September 10, 2011, at U.S. Bank Arena in Cincinnati, Ohio.

He faced fellow finalist Daniel Cormier on May 19, 2012, at Strikeforce: Barnett vs. Cormier to determine the Strikeforce Heavyweight Grand Prix Champion. Dana White announced if Barnett were to defeat Cormier, he would be allowed back into the UFC, "If he wins the fight, I can't see why he wouldn't come [to the UFC]." Barnett lost the bout via unanimous decision (49–46, 50–45, and 50–45), losing for the first time in over 5 years.

In January 2013, Barnett faced a promotional newcomer, Nandor Guelmino, at Strikeforce: Marquardt vs. Saffiedine, the final Strikeforce event. Barnett defeated Guelmino via arm triangle choke submission in the first round.

=== Return to the UFC ===
Barnett initially declined to sign with the UFC. However, on May 21, 2013, it was announced that Barnett had returned to the UFC and signed a multi-fight contract with the promotion.

Barnett faced former UFC Heavyweight Champion Frank Mir on August 31, 2013, at UFC 164. He won the fight in the first round by technical knockout.

Barnett faced Travis Browne on December 28, 2013, at UFC 168. He lost the fight via knockout due to elbow strikes in the first round.

After working as a coach on Road to UFC Japan, Barnett faced Roy Nelson in the main event at UFC Fight Night 75. He won the fight via unanimous decision (48–47, 48–47, and 50–45). The win also earned Barnett his first Performance of the Night bonus award.

Barnett faced Ben Rothwell on January 30, 2016, at UFC on Fox 18. He lost the fight in the second round due to a guillotine choke, resulting in the first loss due to a submission hold during Barnett's lengthy MMA career.

Barnett next faced Andrei Arlovski on September 3, 2016, at UFC Fight Night 93. He won the fight via rear naked choke submission in the third round, earning a Performance of the Night bonus. Both participants were awarded Fight of the Night for their performance.

In December 2016, UFC was notified of a potential USADA doping violation by Barnett from an out-of-competition test. In March 2018, Barnett was clear to fight and received a "public reprimand" instead of a suspension from USADA after it was determined that his failed test was the result of a contaminated supplement.

==== Departure from the UFC ====
On June 20, 2018, Barnett was granted his request to be released from UFC, claiming he does not trust the United States Anti-Doping Agency.

=== Bellator MMA ===
On April 1, 2019, it was revealed that Barnett signed a multi-fight contract with Bellator MMA. Barnett was expected to make his promotional debut against Ronny Markes on December 20, 2019, at Bellator's Salute the Troops event in Honolulu, Hawaii, but was deemed unable to compete due to severe illness on the night of the event. The bout was rescheduled for Bellator 241 on March 13, 2020, but Barnett failed medical tests and was replaced by Matt Mitrione.

== Professional wrestling career ==
=== New Japan Pro-Wrestling (2003–2004) ===
Barnett began his career as a professional wrestler in the New Japan Pro-Wrestling (NJPW) organization, where he wrestled numerous matches in 2003 and 2004. In his first match, he wrestled champion Yuji Nagata for the IWGP Heavyweight Championship. Although unsuccessful in that match, Barnett formed a tag team with Perry Saturn and was undefeated in the following NJPW tour, Fighting Spirit 2003. Barnett wrestled over 50 matches in total for the NJPW promotion.

=== Inoki Genome Federation (2007–2012, 2014) ===
Barnett debuted in Antonio Inoki's Inoki Genome Federation (IGF) wrestling promotion in June 2007 with a victory over Tadao Yasuda. He racked up victories against Don Frye and Montanha Silva before suffering his first loss against Naoya Ogawa. The same man he beat earlier in the night. Since the loss, he has been on a winning streak beating The Predator, Hitokui Yoshiki, Tank Abbott, Jon Andersen, Fonseca, Atsushi Sawada, Bob Sapp, Ultimate Mask, Tim Sylvia, Montanha Silva, Bobby Lashley and Hideki Suzuki.

Starting in February at IGF Genome 14, IGF began a title tournament to crown a new Heavyweight Champion and Barnett not only continued his winning streak but he advanced to the semi-finals of the tournament with his victory over Montanha Silva. In July at IGF Genome 16, he defeated Bobby Lashley with a cross armbreaker to advance to the finals of the title tournament. He was scheduled to face Jérôme Le Banner for the IGF Heavyweight Championship in a tournament final scheduled for August 27 at the IGF Super Stars Festival 2011. However, it was announced on August 19 that Barnett had to pull out of the match up and Le Banner was declared the first ever IGF champion on August 22. However, Josh Barnett would get his shot at the IGF Heavyweight Championship on December 2 against the champion, Jerome Le Banner. Barnett would lose the contest by knockout.

On New Year's Eve, Barnett made his return to Japan for the Fight for Japan event, where he would face Hideki Suzuki in an IGF Rules. Barnett won with a brainbuster.

=== Return to NJPW (2015–present) ===
In January 2015, Barnett began working as a color commentator for NJPW's weekly program on AXS TV. Throughout 2022, Barnett appeared on NJPW Strong, wrestling occasionally. Barrnett also offered to take over booking duties of NJPW Strong and as head coach of the NJPW Academy in Los Angeles before the school was closed in November 2026.

=== Total Nonstop Action Wrestling (2017) ===
During the January 2017 Impact Wrestling tapings, Barnett unsuccessfully faced Bobby Lashley in an open challenge for the TNA World Heavyweight Championship.

=== Return to the IGF (2017) ===
Barnett returned to IGF on April 5, 2017, defeating Shinichi Suzukawa on the promotion's inaugural Next Exciting Wrestling (NEW) event.

=== Game Changer Wrestling (2019–present) ===
Josh Barnett hosted the GCW Bloodsport event of 2019. He fought Minoru Suzuki in the main event. On June 22, 2019, it was announced that Bloodsport 2 would happen on September 14, 2019, in Atlantic City, New Jersey. Jon Moxley was announced as his opponent. After Moxley had to bow out of the bout due to injury, Chris Dickinson would be announced as his replacement. Josh Barnett would go on to defeat Chris Dickinson in the main event.

On January 13, 2020, Josh announced that on April 2, 2020, at Josh Barnett's: Bloodsport 3, he would finally face off against Jon Moxley. Due to the COVID-19 pandemic, the event was rescheduled for October 11 in Marion County, Indiana, and the main event announced for Bloodsport 3 was Jon Moxley vs. Chris Dickinson.

=== All Elite Wrestling (2023) ===
Barnett made his All Elite Wrestling (AEW) debut on October 1, 2023, on the pre-show of WrestleDream. At the event, Barnett was defeated by Claudio Castagnoli. After the match, Barnett praised Castagnolli and requested a future rematch.

== Submission grappling career ==
Despite not having a black belt, Barnett competed at the IBJJF World No-Gi Jiu-Jitsu Championship on November 8, 2009, winning gold in the black belt ultra heavyweight / pessadisimo (over 215 pounds) division by defeating Bruno Paulista in the final. According to Barnett, after his victory, a "Josh Barnett rule" was instituted that required official registration of a black belt and academy.

Barnett competed in the California Classic Brazilian jiu-jitsu tournament on November 15, 2009, in the black belt gi absolute division. He first beat future world champion Otavio Sousa by submission but lost a decision to IBJJF world champion and ADCC veteran Romulo Barral. According to Barnett, it was originally advertised as a no-gi tournament but changed to gi after a vote before the event. Because he didn't own a gi or belt, Barnett was sponsored for a gi by Break Point and given an honorary black belt by Chris Haueter to compete. On December 19, 2009, Erik Paulson awarded Barnett his Brazilian jiu-jitsu black belt. Even though Barnett had never trained in BJJ, he was given his belt based on competition merit and overall knowledge.

In the co-main event of Metamoris 4 on August 9, 2014, Barnett faced Dean Lister, a multiple-time world champion in submission grappling to determine the inaugural Metamoris Heavyweight Champion. Barnett became the first person in sixteen years to defeat Lister via submission, submitting Lister with a scarf hold in the final thirty seconds of the match.

On May 9, 2015, in the main event of Metamoris 6, Barnett defended the Metamoris Heavyweight Championship against Ryron Gracie. In a bout promoted as "catch wrestling vs. Gracie jiu-jitsu", Barnett secured a takedown in the opening minutes and maintained top position for the duration. After moving to north-south position, Gracie attempted to scissor Barnett's head, which Barnett countered into a toehold to make Gracie submit at 12:58. According to Barnett, he never received his payment for the match, which happened to other Metamoris competitors as well.

Barnett faced Phil De Fries in a grappling match at XTB KSW Epic on February 24, 2024. Neither man submitted the other, and the match was ruled a draw.

=== Catch wrestling ===
On November 2, 2018, at the Catch Wrestling World Championships hosted by The Snake Pit in Bolton, England, Barnett competed and won the super heavyweight (100+ kg) division. Also at the event, Barnett faced Ian Jones, the heavyweight runner-up, in a challenge match that went to a draw.

On November 3, 2018, Barnett faced Chris Crossan for the Legit Pro Wrestling Heavyweight Championship. Barnett defeated Crossan to win the championship.

On October 28, 2023, Barnett competed in a catch wrestling match against Owen Livesey at the Snake Pit World Championships. He lost the match by decision.

==== American Catch Wrestling Association ====
Barnett has been an ambassador for catch wrestling as a sport, bringing American teams to the Snake Pit World Championships and heading the American Catch Wrestling Association (ACWA). In December 2023, the ACWA held the first modern US national championships for catch wrestling, the ACWA US Open, with over 90 competitors.

== Bare-knuckle boxing career ==
Barnett competed against former KSW Heavyweight Champion Marcin Różalski in a bare-knuckle boxing match with elbows allowed on October 23, 2020, due to an agreement with Bellator. The fight took place at the KSW event titled Genesis. Barnett defeated Różalski by TKO via doctor stoppage after the second round.

== Other endeavors ==
In 2017, Barnett formed his own fight team based on the style popularized in Japan. Named UWF USA, it is a shootfighting and catch wrestling based fighting team. Barnett is the head coach/trainer for the team.

Barnett appeared as himself in an episode of the 2013 web series Black Dynamite Teaches a Hard Way!, where a Black Dynamite mannequin teaches him the consequences of littering.

== Fighting style ==
Barnett defines himself as a catch wrestler. He was introduced to the discipline while training for his second professional fight with Matt Hume's team at AMC Pankration. His grappling technique is based on catch, utilizing the controls, rides, and pinning holds to exert pressure over his opponent and grind him down when the fight gets to the ground. In order to finish the match, he is skilled in the aspect of lockflow or chain wrestling, in which he gets from a position to another to get a submission hold. As well as his grappling expertise, Barnett also has a powerful Muay Thai game, which features the ability to switch stances during the fight, confusing his opponent and strengthening Barnett's assault. Barnett has also shown the ability to enhance his striking with catch wrestling, using collar ties and wrist grips to set up elbows and knees against the fence.

== Personal life ==
In an interview on The Steve Austin Show, Barnett confirmed that he is not religious. In his spare time, he enjoys driving and repairing automobiles, preferring vintage models. He is a self-proclaimed cinephile and cites the final cut of Blade Runner as his favorite motion picture.

He plays and is a fan of the card game Magic: The Gathering.

Barnett was dubbed the "Baby-Faced Assassin" early in his career due to his youthful appearance and dominance, with the moniker staying with him into his 30s. His later nickname "The Warmaster" was in response to no longer looking or fighting like his younger self. It was inspired by a song by the British death metal band Bolt Thrower, itself named after a character from the sci-fi miniature wargame Warhammer 40,000. Barnett is a noted heavy metal fan, and has used Bolt Thrower as entrance music during his MMA career.

== Championships and accomplishments ==
=== Mixed martial arts ===
- Pancrase
  - Openweight King of Pancrase (One time, last champion)
    - Two successful title defenses
- PRIDE Fighting Championship
  - 2006 PRIDE Heavyweight Grand Prix Runner-up
- Strikeforce
  - 2013 Strikeforce Heavyweight Grand Prix Runner-up
- Icon Sport
  - SuperBrawl 13 Heavyweight Tournament Winner
- Ultimate Fighting Championship
  - UFC Heavyweight Championship (One time)
    - Youngest UFC Heavyweight Champion in history (24-years-old)
  - Fight of the Night (One time) vs. Andrei Arlovski
  - Performance of the Night (Two times) vs. Roy Nelson and Andrei Arlovski
  - UFC Encyclopedia Awards
    - Fight of the Night (Two times) vs. Pedro Rizzo and Randy Couture
    - Submission of the Night (One time) vs. Semmy Schilt
  - Most significant clinch strikes in a UFC bout (75) (vs. Roy Nelson)
- Sherdog
  - Mixed Martial Arts Hall of Fame
- MMA Fighting
  - 2006 Fight of the Year vs. Antônio Rodrigo Nogueira at Pride Shockwave 2006

=== Submission grappling ===
- International Brazilian Jiu-Jitsu Federation
  - 2009 World No-Gi Jiu-Jitsu Championship - 1st place (black belt, ultra heavy)
- International Gracie Jiu-Jitsu Federation
  - 2010 Gracie US Nationals - 1st place (206+ lb, advanced no-gi)
- Metamoris
  - Metamoris Heavyweight Champion (One time, only champion)
    - One successful title defense vs. Ryron Gracie
- The Snake Pit
  - 2018 Catch Wrestling World Championships - Champion (100+ kg, super heavyweight)
- Legit Pro Wrestling
  - LPW Heavyweight Champion (2018)

== Mixed martial arts record ==
Professional record breakdown
43 matches	35 wins	8 losses
By knockout	10	4
By submission	19	1
By decision	5	3
By disqualification	1	0

Res.	Record	Opponent	Method	Event	Date	Round	Time	Location	Notes
Win	35–8	Andrei Arlovski	Submission (rear-naked choke)	UFC Fight Night: Arlovski vs. Barnett	September 3, 2016	3	2:53	Hamburg, Germany	Performance of the Night. Fight of the Night.
Loss	34–8	Ben Rothwell	Submission (guillotine choke)	UFC on Fox: Johnson vs. Bader	January 30, 2016	2	3:48	Newark, New Jersey, United States	
Win	34–7	Roy Nelson	Decision (unanimous)	UFC Fight Night: Barnett vs. Nelson	September 27, 2015	5	5:00	Saitama, Japan	Performance of the Night.
Loss	33–7	Travis Browne	KO (elbows)	UFC 168	December 28, 2013	1	1:00	Las Vegas, Nevada, United States	
Win	33–6	Frank Mir	TKO (knee)	UFC 164	August 31, 2013	1	1:56	Milwaukee, Wisconsin, United States	
Win	32–6	Nandor Guelmino	Submission (arm-triangle choke)	Strikeforce: Marquardt vs. Saffiedine	January 12, 2013	1	2:11	Oklahoma City, Oklahoma, United States	
Loss	31–6	Daniel Cormier	Decision (unanimous)	Strikeforce: Barnett vs. Cormier	May 19, 2012	5	5:00	San Jose, California, United States	Strikeforce Heavyweight Grand Prix Final.
Win	31–5	Sergei Kharitonov	Submission (arm-triangle choke)	Strikeforce: Barnett vs. Kharitonov	September 10, 2011	1	4:28	Cincinnati, Ohio, United States	Strikeforce Heavyweight Grand Prix Semifinal.
Win	30–5	Brett Rogers	Submission (arm-triangle choke)	Strikeforce: Overeem vs. Werdum	June 18, 2011	2	1:58	Dallas, Texas, United States	Strikeforce Heavyweight Grand Prix Quarterfinal.
Win	29–5	Geronimo dos Santos	TKO (punches)	Impact FC 1	July 10, 2010	1	2:35	Brisbane, Australia	
Win	28–5	Siala-Mou Siliga	Submission (kimura)	DREAM 13	March 22, 2010	1	4:41	Kanagawa, Japan	
Win	27–5	Gilbert Yvel	TKO (submission to punches)	Affliction: Day of Reckoning	January 24, 2009	3	3:05	Anaheim, California, United States	
Win	26–5	Pedro Rizzo	KO (punch)	Affliction: Banned	July 19, 2008	2	1:44	Anaheim, California, United States	
Win	25–5	Jeff Monson	Decision (unanimous)	World Victory Road Presents: Sengoku 2	May 18, 2008	3	5:00	Tokyo, Japan	
Win	24–5	Hidehiko Yoshida	Submission (heel hook)	World Victory Road Presents: Sengoku First Battle	March 5, 2008	3	3:23	Tokyo, Japan	
Loss	23–5	Antônio Rodrigo Nogueira	Decision (unanimous)	PRIDE FC: Shockwave 2006	December 31, 2006	3	5:00	Saitama, Japan	
Win	23–4	Pawel Nastula	Submission (toe hold)	PRIDE 32: The Real Deal	October 21, 2006	2	3:04	Las Vegas, Nevada, United States	
Loss	22–4	Mirko Cro Cop	TKO (submission to punches)	PRIDE FC: Final Conflict Absolute	September 10, 2006	1	7:32	Saitama, Japan	2006 PRIDE Heavyweight Grand Prix Final.
Win	22–3	Antônio Rodrigo Nogueira	Decision (split)	PRIDE FC: Final Conflict Absolute.	September 10, 2006	2	5:00	Saitama, Japan	2006 PRIDE Heavyweight Grand Prix Semifinal.
Win	21–3	Mark Hunt	Submission (kimura)	PRIDE FC: Critical Countdown Absolute	July 1, 2006	1	2:02	Saitama, Japan	2006 PRIDE Heavyweight Grand Prix Quarterfinal.
Win	20–3	Alexander Emelianenko	Submission (keylock)	PRIDE FC: Total Elimination Absolute	May 5, 2006	2	1:57	Osaka, Japan	2006 PRIDE Heavyweight Grand Prix Opening Round.
Win	19–3	Kazuhiro Nakamura	Submission (rear-naked choke)	PRIDE 31: Dreamers	February 26, 2006	1	8:10	Saitama, Japan	
Loss	18–3	Mirko Cro Cop	Decision (unanimous)	PRIDE 30	October 23, 2005	3	5:00	Saitama, Japan	
Loss	18–2	Mirko Cro Cop	TKO (shoulder injury)	PRIDE 28	October 31, 2004	1	0:46	Saitama, Japan	
Win	18–1	Rene Rooze	TKO (punches)	K-1 MMA: Romanex	May 22, 2004	1	2:15	Saitama, Japan	
Win	17–1	Semmy Schilt	Submission (armbar)	Inoki Bom-Ba-Ye 2003	December 31, 2003	3	4:48	Hyogo, Japan	Defended the Pancrase Openweight Championship.
Win	16–1	Yoshiki Takahashi	Submission (triangle armbar)	NJPW Ultimate Crush II	October 13, 2003	2	2:52	Tokyo, Japan	Defended the Pancrase Openweight Championship.
Win	15–1	Yuki Kondo	Submission (rear-naked choke)	Pancrase: 10th Anniversary Show	August 31, 2003	3	3:26	Tokyo, Japan	Won the Pancrase Openweight Championship.
Win	14–1	Jimmy Ambriz	TKO (knee and punches)	NJPW Ultimate Crush	May 2, 2003	1	3:05	Tokyo, Japan	
Win	13–1	Randy Couture	TKO (punches)	UFC 36	March 22, 2002	2	4:35	Las Vegas, Nevada, United States	Won the UFC Heavyweight Championship. Barnett was stripped of the title on July 26, 2002 due to a failed post-fight drug test.
Win	12–1	Bobby Hoffman	TKO (submission to punches)	UFC 34	November 2, 2001	2	4:25	Las Vegas, Nevada, United States	Tested positive for banned substances and given a warning by the NSAC.
Win	11–1	Semmy Schilt	Submission (armbar)	UFC 32	June 29, 2001	1	4:21	East Rutherford, New Jersey, United States	
Loss	10–1	Pedro Rizzo	KO (punch)	UFC 30	February 23, 2001	2	4:21	Atlantic City, New Jersey, United States	
Win	10–0	Gan McGee	TKO (punches)	UFC 28	November 17, 2000	2	4:34	Atlantic City, New Jersey, United States	Super Heavyweight bout.
Win	9–0	Dan Severn	Submission (armbar)	SuperBrawl 16	February 8, 2000	4	1:21	Honolulu, Hawaii, United States	
Win	8–0	Bobby Hoffman	Decision (unanimous)	SuperBrawl 13	September 7, 1999	3	5:00	Honolulu, Hawaii, United States	Won SuperBrawl 13 Heavyweight Tournament.
Win	7–0	John Marsh	Submission (kimura)	SuperBrawl 13	September 7, 1999	1	4:23	Honolulu, Hawaii, United States	SuperBrawl 13 Heavyweight Tournament Semifinal.
Win	6–0	Juha Tuhkasaari	Submission (armbar)	SuperBrawl 13	September 7, 1999	1	3:32	Honolulu, Hawaii, United States	SuperBrawl 13 Heavyweight Tournament Quarterfinal.
Win	5–0	Trevor Howard	Submission (armbar)	UFCF 4	September 19, 1998	1	N/A	Washington, United States	
Win	4–0	Bob Gilstrap	DQ	UFCF 3	March 14, 1998	1	0:42	Lynnwood, Washington, United States	
Win	3–0	Chris Munsen	TKO (punches)	UFCF 2	September 6, 1997	1	N/A	Washington, United States	
Win	2–0	Bob Gilstrap	Decision (unanimous)	UFCF 2	July 7, 1997	1	10:00	Washington, United States	
Win	1–0	Chris Charnos	Submission (rear-naked choke)	UFCF 1	January 11, 1997	1	2:41	Washington, United States	

== Submission grappling record (incomplete) ==
Result	Opponent	Method	Event	Date	Round	Time	Notes
Draw	(England) Phil De Fries	Draw	KSW Epic: Khalidov vs. Adamek	February 24, 2024	1	10:00	
Loss	(United States) Gordon Ryan	Submission (triangle choke)	Quintet	October 5, 2018	1	N/A	
Win	(United States) Ryron Gracie	Submission (toe hold)	Metamoris VI	May 9, 2015	1	12:58	Defended the Metamoris Heavyweight Championship.
Win	(United States) Dean Lister	Submission (scarf-hold choke)	Metamoris IV	August 9, 2014	1	19:48	For the inaugural Metamoris Heavyweight Championship.
Loss	(United States) Ricardo Almeida	Submission (guillotine choke)	ADCC	2000	N/A	N/A	Absolute
Loss	(United States) Mark Kerr	Submission (kimura)	ADCC	2000	N/A	N/A	+99 kg
Loss	(United States) Garth Taylor	Points	ADCC	1999	1	10:00	Absolute
Win	(Brazil) Pedro Duarte	Submission	ADCC	1999	1	1:19	Absolute
Loss	(United States) Mark Kerr	Points	ADCC	1999	1	10:00	+99 kg
Win	(United States) Travis Fulton	Points	ADCC	1999	1	15:00	+99 kg

== Bare knuckle boxing record ==
Professional record breakdown
1 match	1 win	0 losses
By knockout	1	0

Res.	Record	Opponent	Method	Event	Date	Round	Time	Location	Notes
Win	1–0	Marcin Różalski	TKO (doctor stoppage)	KSW Genesis: Różalski vs. Barnett	October 23, 2020	2	3:00	Poland	Heavyweight bout

== See also ==
- List of male mixed martial artists
- List of multi-sport athletes
- List of multi-sport champions
- List of professional wrestlers by MMA record

Achievements
Preceded by Randy Couture	7th UFC Heavyweight Champion; March 22, 2002 – July 26, 2002	Vacant Barnett stripped of title Title next held by Ricco Rodriguez
