= Affliction Entertainment =

American mixed martial arts promotion company

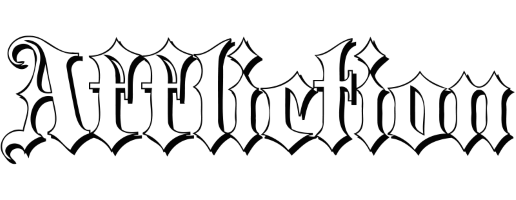
- Industry: Mixed martial arts promotion
- Founded: California, US (2008)
- Defunct: July 24, 2009
- Headquarters: Los Angeles, United States
- Key people: Tom Atencio (vice president); Donald Trump (major shareholder); Michael Cohen (chief operating officer); Golden Boy Promotions (partner)

Affliction Entertainment was an American mixed martial arts (MMA) promotion company created by Affliction Clothing in 2008. The UFC prohibited its fighters from wearing Affliction clothing after learning Affliction was applying to become an MMA fight promoter. Although the promotion company bore the Affliction name, it was run independently of Affliction Clothing.

In July 2009, Affliction announced that it would exit the fight promotion business and that Affliction Clothing would become a UFC sponsor.

== Events ==
Affliction Entertainment promoted two pay-per-view (PPV) MMA events. The third (Trilogy) was scheduled for August 1, 2009, but was canceled July 24, 2009 due to Josh Barnett testing positive in the pre-screening drug test. On July 24, 2009 it was announced that Affliction had folded their MMA Promotion and would sponsor the UFC once again.

=== Affliction: Banned ===
Affliction entered the world of MMA fight promotion with the announcement of its event Affliction: Banned which took place on July 19, 2008 in Anaheim, California at the Honda Center. The card at Banned featured many of the top MMA heavyweight fighters. The main event was the return of Pride FC Heavyweight Champion Fedor Emelianenko fighting against former UFC Heavyweight Champion Tim Sylvia. Emelianenko submitted Sylvia thirty-six seconds into the first round to win in convincing fashion. The event saw victories by former UFC Heavyweight Champions Andrei Arlovski and Josh Barnett and former UFC Light-heavyweight Champion Vitor Belfort. Affliction's total attendance (14,832), with a paid attendance of (11,242) and live gate of ($2,085,510) The total disclosed payroll for the event was $3,332,100.

=== Affliction: Day of Reckoning ===
Affliction: Day of Reckoning was the second event by Affliction and took place on January 24, 2009 in Anaheim, California at the Honda Center. The main event featured Fedor Emelianenko against former UFC Heavyweight Champion Andrei Arlovski. Josh "Babyface Assassin" Barnett fought on the card and defeated Gilbert Yvel. In a light-heavyweight match former Strikeforce Champion Renato "Babalu" Sobral beat Rameau Thierry Sokoudjou. Matt Lindland was reassigned from a 195-pound catchweight bout with Sobral to a middleweight matchup against former UFC Light-Heavyweight Champion Vitor Belfort.

Headlining the undercard, which was broadcast on HDNet Fights, the first and last IFL Light-Heavyweight Champion Vladimir Matyushenko lost to PRIDE veteran Antônio Rogério Nogueira.

=== Affliction: Trilogy ===
Affliction: Trilogy was to feature a fight between Fedor Emelianenko and Josh Barnett as its headline event at the Honda Center in Anaheim, California on August 1, 2009. On July 22, 11 days before the scheduled event, the California State Athletic Commission announced it would not license Barnett because he tested positive for a banned substance. Later that day, the CSAC issued a press release which stated that anabolic steroids was the substance detected in Barnett's drug test.

#	Event title	Date	Arena	Location	Attendance
2	Affliction: Day of Reckoning	January 24, 2009	Honda Center	Anaheim, California, United States	13,228
1	Affliction: Banned	July 19, 2008	Honda Center	Anaheim, California, United States	14,832

==== Cancellation aftermath ====
Many of the fighters on the card were able to find another promotion to work for shortly after Affliction Entertainment's demise. The Renato Sobral vs. Gegard Mousasi bout was moved to Strikeforce: Carano vs. Cyborg for Sobral's Light Heavyweight Title, while Jay Hieron fought Jesse Taylor on the same card. Zuffa also picked up several fighters with the LC Davis vs. Javier Vasquez bout being moved to WEC 42, the Mark Hominick vs. Deividas Taurosevicius bout being moved to WEC 43, the Ben Rothwell vs. Chase Gormley bout moved to UFC 104 and Vitor Belfort main eventing UFC 103. As well Paul Daley, Dan Lauzon, and Rafaello Oliveira have signed contracts with Zuffa.

The Jessie Gibbs vs. Rob Broughton bout was moved to M-1 Global Presents Breakthrough. While Lucio Linhares from the other M-1 Global bout was also moved to the card, with a new opponent, he ended up fighting Mikhail Zayats.
