= Josh Barnett's Bloodsport X =

2024 Game Changer Wrestling pay-per-view event

- Promotional poster
- Promotion: Game Changer Wrestling
- Date: April 4, 2024
- City: Philadelphia, Pennsylvania
- Venue: Penn's Landing Caterers

Game Changer Wrestling event chronology
← Previous; The Block is Hot	Next → GCW/JCW vs. The World

Josh Barnett's Bloodsport X was a professional wrestling pay-per-view event produced by Game Changer Wrestling (GCW). It was held on April 4, 2024 at Penn's Landing Caterers in Philadelphia, Pennsylvania and was streamed live on Triller TV in conjunction with the Collective during WrestleMania XL weekend. The show also featured wrestlers from WWE, Total Nonstop Action Wrestling (TNA), New Japan Pro-Wrestling (NJPW), Major League Wrestling (MLW), and All Elite Wrestling (AEW) and their sister promotion Ring of Honor.

== Production ==
=== Background ===
Bloodsport is an annual professional wrestling event which features worked shoot matches in a style that mimics the early days of MMA and catch wrestling. It is common for Bloodsport competitors to have some experience in other combat sports and/or mixed martial arts, as well as professional wrestling, as these one on one matches often appear stiff and have a feel of a classic Shoot-style wrestling fights. The ropes and turnbuckles for the ring are often removed and replaced by a ring canvas with no ropes or turnbuckles. The first Bloodsport, titled Matt Riddle's Bloodsport, took place on April 5, 2019 in Kenner, Louisiana with Matt Riddle vs. Minoru Suzuki being the main event match. On August 18, 2018, Matt Riddle made his WWE debut and the promotion announced that they had signed him as a member of the NXT roster. Beginning in 2019, mixed martial arts fighter and professional wrestler Josh Barnett had taken over booking duties for the event which was renamed to Josh Barnett's Bloodsport. The first Bloodsport event to be booked By Josh Barnett took place on April 4, 2019 at in Jersey City, New Jersey in conjunction with the inaugural Collective.

On January 4, 2024, GCW announced that Bloodsport X would take place on April 4, 2024 in Philadelphia, Pennsylvania as part of the Collective. On February 18, 2024, GCW announced that Nic Nemeth would be fighting against Mike Bailey during the event. On February 27, 2024, Barnett announced that he would be fighting against Johnny Bloodsport. On March 15, 2024, GCW announced that Shayna Baszler would be the first WWE-signed wrestler to compete at a Bloodsport event. On March 19, 2024, GCW announced that Baszler would be fighting against TNA wrestler Masha Slamovich.

=== Storylines ===
Josh Barnett's Bloodsport X featured professional wrestling matches that involves different wrestlers from pre-existing scripted feuds and storylines. Wrestlers portrayed villains, heroes, or less distinguishable characters in scripted events that built tension and culminated in a wrestling match or series of matches. Storylines were produced on Game Changer Wrestling's various pay-per-view events.

== Results ==
No.	Results	Stipulations	Times
1	Victor Benjamin defeated Akira Way by technical knockout	Singles match	5:06
2	Nic Nemeth defeated Mike Bailey by technical submission	Singles match	5:05
3	Lindsay Snow defeated Lady Frost by submission	Women's tournament semifinals match	2:14
4	Marina Shafir defeated Janai Kai by submission	Women's tournament semifinals match	3:55
5	Charlie Dempsey defeated Matt Makowski (with Tracy Williams) by submission	Singles match	6:23
6	Takuya Nomura defeated Fuminori Abe by technical submission	Singles match	7:36
7	Erik Hammer defeated Lou Nixon by submission	Singles match	3:46
8	Minoru Suzuki defeated Royce Isaacs by referee stoppage	Singles match	8:37
9	Timothy Thatcher defeated Axel Tischer by submission	Singles match	7:52
10	Shayna Baszler (with Zoey Stark) defeated Masha Slamovich (with Jordynne Grace) by technical submission	Singles match	7:12
11	Marina Shafir defeated Lindsay Snow by technical knockout	Women's tournament final match	7:44
12	Josh Barnett defeated Johnny Bloodsport by technical knockout	Singles match	7:57

Bloodsport Women's Tournament

Semifinals
Lady Frost	2:14
Lindsay Snow	Sub
Janai Kai	Sub
Marina Shafir	3:55

Final
Lindsay Snow	7:44
Marina Shafir	TKO
