= Dolph Ziggler =

American professional wrestler (born 1980)

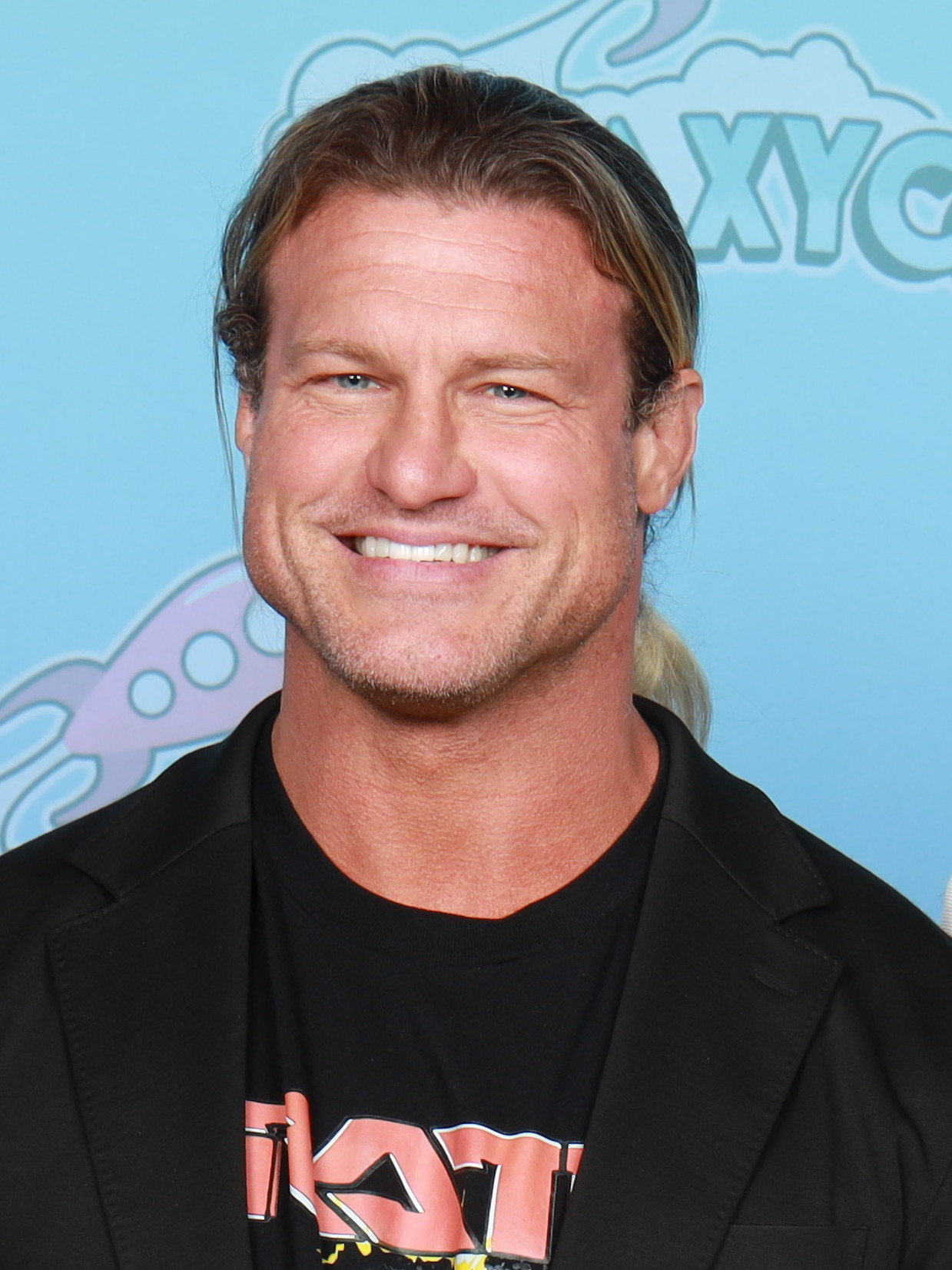
- Nemeth in 2025

Personal information
- Born: Nicholas Theodore Nemeth; July 27, 1980 (age 46) Cleveland, Ohio, U.S.
- Education: Kent State University
- Relative: Ryan Nemeth (brother)

Professional wrestling career
- Ring names: Dolph Ziggler; Nic Nemeth; Nick Nemeth; Nicky
- Billed height: 6 ft 0 in (183 cm)
- Billed weight: 213 lb (97 kg)
- Billed from: Hollywood, Florida
- Trained by: Florida Championship Wrestling; Lance Storm; Ohio Valley Wrestling; Steve Keirn; Tom Prichard
- Debut: November 3, 2004

Nicholas Theodore Nemeth (born July 27, 1980) is an American professional wrestler. He is signed to Total Nonstop Action Wrestling (TNA), where he performs under his real name (stylized as Nic Nemeth) and is one-half of The Nemeths and the current TNA World Tag Team Champions alongside his brother Ryan Nemeth in their second reign. Nemeth is best known for his tenure in WWE from 2004 to 2023, where he performed under the ring names Nicky and most notably Dolph Ziggler.

After a career in amateur wrestling, where he established several school records for Kent State University, Nemeth signed a developmental contract with WWE in 2004 and was sent to Ohio Valley Wrestling (OVW), where he wrestled under his real name. He was promoted to WWE's Raw brand shortly afterwards in 2005, playing the caddie sidekick to Kerwin White. He was sent back to OVW shortly afterwards, being given the name Nicky and joining the cheerleading-themed Spirit Squad, who debuted on Raw in January 2006 and won the World Tag Team Championship once before returning to development.

After working in OVW and Florida Championship Wrestling (FCW), he returned to the main roster, repackaged as Dolph Ziggler, in September 2008. Since then, he held the World Heavyweight Championship twice, the NXT Championship once, the Intercontinental Championship six times, the United States Championship twice, the Raw Tag Team Championship twice, and the SmackDown Tag Team Championship once. His other accomplishments include becoming the sole survivor of two Survivor Series elimination matches and the 2012 Money in the Bank winner as well as headlining multiple WWE pay-per-view events. Nemeth was released from WWE in September 2023, ending his 19-year run with the company.

After WWE, Nemeth would debut on the independent circuit using his real name. In January 2024, he made his debut in New Japan Pro-Wrestling (NJPW), appearing in the crowd alongside his brother Ryan at Wrestle Kingdom 18, and made his TNA debut at 2024's Hard To Kill. One month later, he won the IWGP Global Heavyweight Championship, his first major non-WWE championship, in his NJPW debut match. On April 27, at Triplemanía XXXII, he won the vacant AAA Mega Championship. Three months later, on July 20, he would win the TNA World Championship at that year's Slammiversary. In 2025, he won the TNA World Tag Team Championship for the first time with Ryan.

== Early life ==
Nicholas Theodore Nemeth was born in Cleveland, Ohio on July 27, 1980. He has been a fan of professional wrestling since he was five years old, when he attended a wrestling event at the Richfield Coliseum, and he decided to become a professional wrestler at age 12. He later revealed on Colt Cabana's Art of Wrestling Podcast that he chose his WWE name "Dolph" because that was his great-grandfather's name, and his friend suggested the surname "Ziggler". Nemeth attended St. Edward High School in Lakewood, Ohio, where he was an amateur wrestler and holds the school record for most pins in a career with 82. At St. Edward, he was teammates with Gray Maynard and Andy Hrovat.

During his time at St. Edward, the wrestling team won the National Championships on two occasions. He was a collegiate wrestler at Kent State University, eventually setting what was then the record for most career wins in the team's history. His record was passed in 2006; as of 2010, he stands second all-time in career victories at Kent State. He had 121 career wins between 2000 and 2003. He majored in political science with a pre-law minor. Prior to his WWE tryout, he had been accepted to the law school at Arizona State University, where he was due to start his first semester. He was a three-time All-Mid-American Conference champion, winning the 165 lb (75 kg) tournament in 2000, 2002, and 2003; as of 2010, he is the last wrestler from Kent State University to have won three wrestling conference championships.

== Professional wrestling career ==
=== World Wrestling Entertainment / WWE (2004–2023) ===
==== The Spirit Squad (2004–2006) ====
Nemeth signed a contract with World Wrestling Entertainment (WWE) in 2004. He was assigned to its developmental territory Ohio Valley Wrestling (OVW), debuting on November 3, 2004, under his real name, stylized as "Nick Nemeth". After briefly teaming with Steve Lewington, Nemeth went on to feud with Paul Burchill. In August 2005, he unsuccessfully challenged Ken Doane for the OVW Television Championship. In September 2005, he unsuccessfully challenged Johnny Jeter for the OVW Heavyweight Championship. In October 2005, he began wrestling on main roster house shows. After joining WWE's main roster as a member of the Spirit Squad in January 2006, Nemeth continued to wrestle sporadically for OVW until April 2006.

Nemeth made his main roster television debut on the September 25, 2005, episode of Sunday Night Heat. He was made the enforcer and sidekick for Chavo Guerrero, who was using a golfer in-ring persona and going by the ring name of "Kerwin White". As such, Nemeth became White's caddie. His wrestling debut came on an episode of Sunday Night Heat, teaming up with White in a tag team match against Shelton Benjamin and Matt Striker. After the death of Eddie Guerrero, Chavo Guerrero dropped the "Kerwin White" character, and Nemeth no longer played the role of his caddie and tag partner. After a few months of wrestling in dark matches and at house shows, he was sent back to OVW.

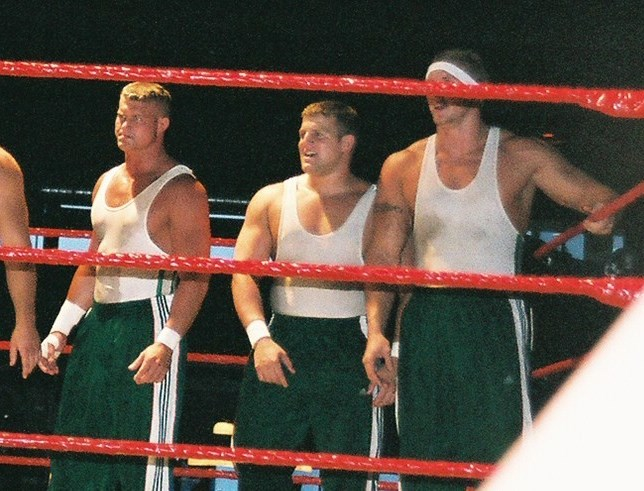
Nicky (left) with Mikey and Kenny as part of The Spirit Squad in 2006

Nemeth became a part of the Spirit Squad faction, a group of five wrestlers who used the in-ring personas of male cheerleaders, and adopted the name Nicky in OVW during late 2005. The Spirit Squad members trained with real cheerleaders and gymnasts to ensure their characters were believable. On January 23, 2006, they had their WWE television debut as a group, appearing on Raw. They later became a part of the ongoing scripted feud between WWE chairman Vince McMahon and Shawn Michaels. The heel McMahon brought in the Spirit Squad to attack Michaels on numerous occasions, including placing them in multiple handicap matches. The stable won the World Tag Team Championship on April 3 on Rawwhen Kenny and Mikey defeated Big Show and Kane, with all five members were recognized as the champions under the Freebird Rule.

The feud with Michaels evolved into a feud with D-Generation X when Triple H joined Michaels. DX defeated the Spirit Squad in handicap tag team matches at Vengeance and a clean sweep in an elimination handicap match at Saturday Night's Main Event XXXIII.

After the stable lost the tag team titles against Ric Flair and Roddy Piper at Cyber Sunday, the group disbanded when they were sent back to OVW.

==== Ohio Valley Wrestling (2007–2008) ====
Nemeth returned to OVW, where he worked with Mike Mondo, formerly Mikey as the "Frat Pack". The team disbanded in the early parts of 2007. At the end of August 2007, Nemeth and Mike Mondo were moved to the Florida Championship Wrestling (FCW) developmental territory and in his debut there, Nemeth gained the nickname "The Natural". He won the FCW Florida Tag Team Championship twice.

==== Repackaging as Dolph Ziggler (2008–2010) ====
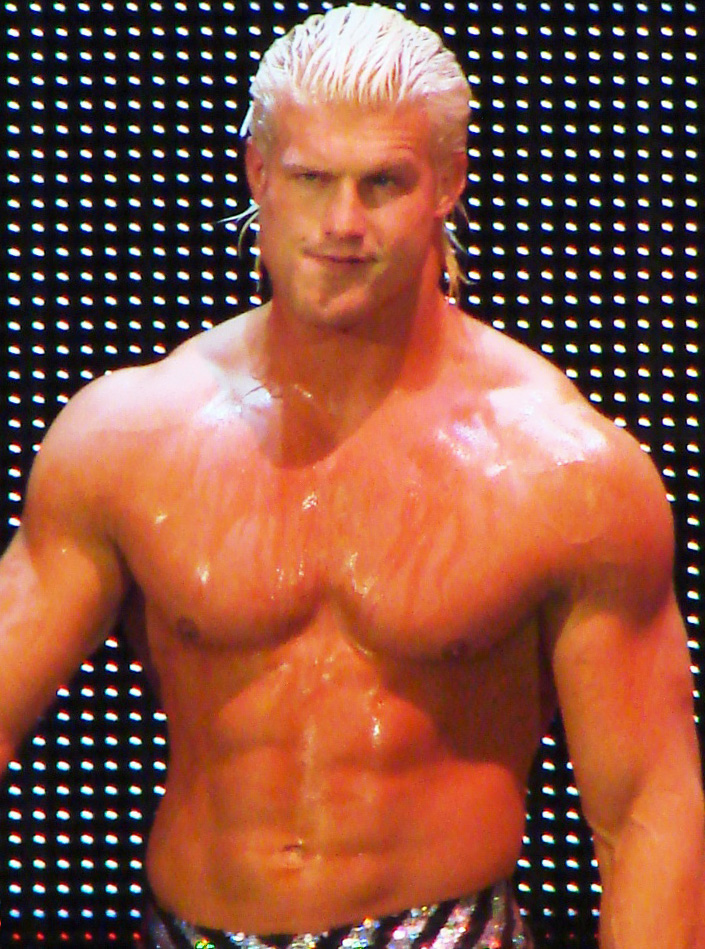
Ziggler in September 2008

On September 15, 2008, Nemeth re-debuted on Raw (as a heel), introducing himself in a backstage segment under the name "Dolph Ziggler", but the next month was suspended for 30 days for a violation of WWE's Wellness Program policy. He worked on Raw until he was drafted to the SmackDown brand as part of the 2009 Supplemental Draft. He made his debut on the April 17 episode of SmackDown, defeating United States Champion, Montel Vontavious Porter (MVP) in a non-title match, and, as a result, the following week he demanded a match for the championship. On the May 1 episode of SmackDown, however, he failed to win the championship, after he was pinned by MVP. Ziggler then started a rivalry with The Great Khali, that culminated at The Bash pay-per-view on June 28, where Ziggler defeated Khali in a No Disqualification match.

Ziggler then entered an on-screen relationship with WWE Diva Maria, and she became his valet. He simultaneously started a scripted rivalry with Intercontinental Champion Rey Mysterio, who defeated Ziggler at Night of Champions on July 26 and SummerSlam on August 23 to retain the championship. In September, Mysterio lost the Intercontinental Championship to John Morrison, and Ziggler entered a feud with Morrison after defeating him by countout in a non-title match, but lost to him at the Hell in a Cell pay-per-view on October 4. On the episode of SmackDown following Hell in a Cell, Ziggler ended his on-screen relationship with Maria after she accidentally cost him a match against Morrison for the Intercontinental Championship. At Breaking Point on September 13, Ziggler made an appearance during a promo by Pat Patterson, in which Ziggler attacked Patterson until Morrison made the save. He again failed to win the Intercontinental title from Morrison twice, wrestling him to a double countout on the November 13 episode of SmackDown and losing a two-out-of-three falls match the following week to end the feud. On the February 26, 2010, episode of SmackDown, Ziggler defeated John Morrison and R-Truth in a triple threat qualifying match to compete in the Money in the Bank ladder match at WrestleMania XXVI on March 28, but was ultimately unsuccessful.

==== Alliance with Vickie Guerrero (2010–2012) ====
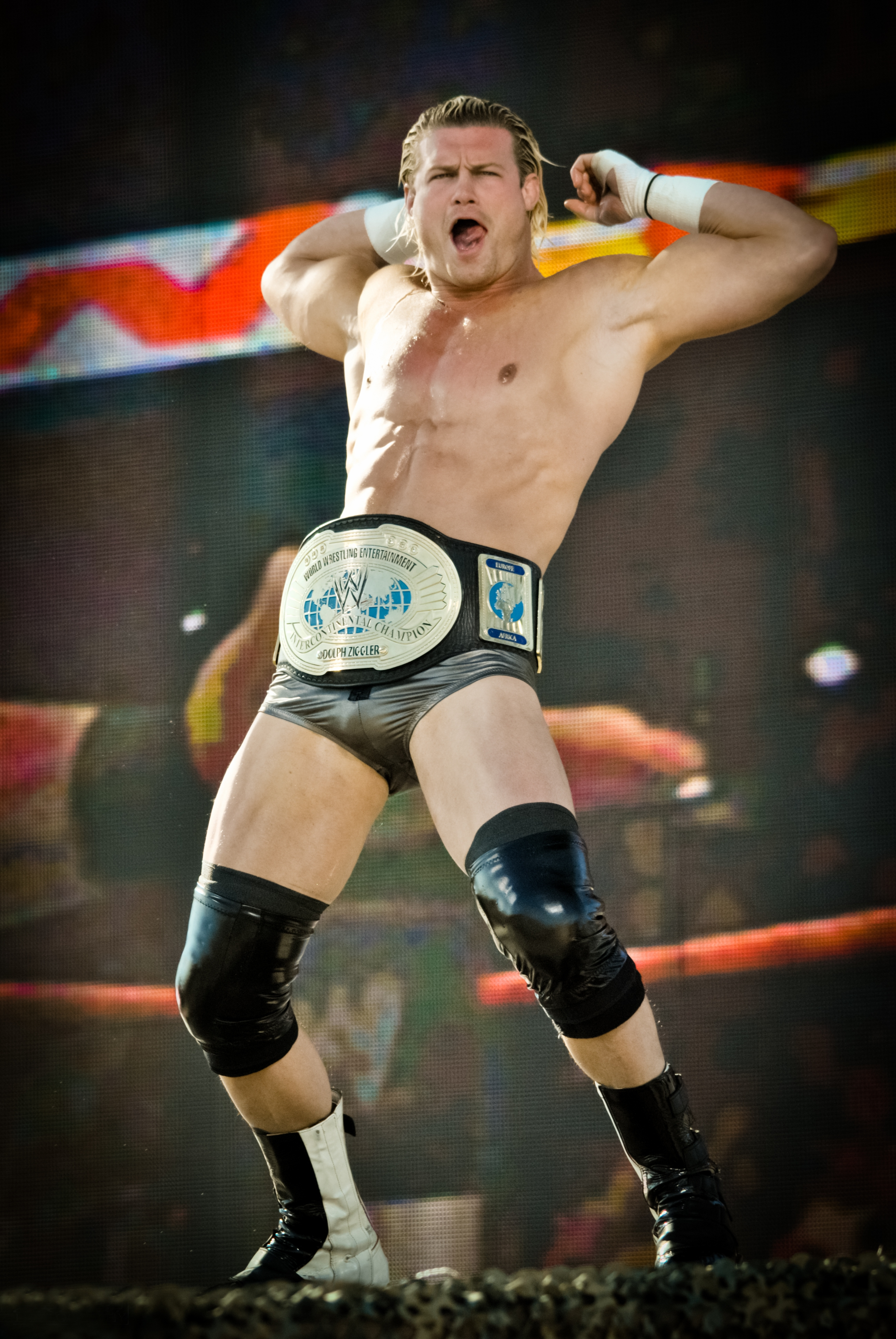
Ziggler as WWE Intercontinental Championship at the 2010 Tribute to the Troops event

In June 2010, he began a romantic storyline with Vickie Guerrero, who began accompanying him to the ring. Ziggler won the WWE Intercontinental Championship from Kofi Kingston on July 28 (aired August 6) at SmackDown. In his first title defense at SummerSlam on August 15, he retained the championship against Kingston when the match ended in a no contest due to interference from The Nexus. Ziggler was able to make a successful title defense against Kingston at the Night of Champions pay-per-view, and against Kaval at Survivor Series. During this time, Ziggler was chosen as a "Pro" for the fourth season of NXT, with Jacob Novak as his Rookie, but later was changed to Byron Saxton when Ziggler won a battle royal.

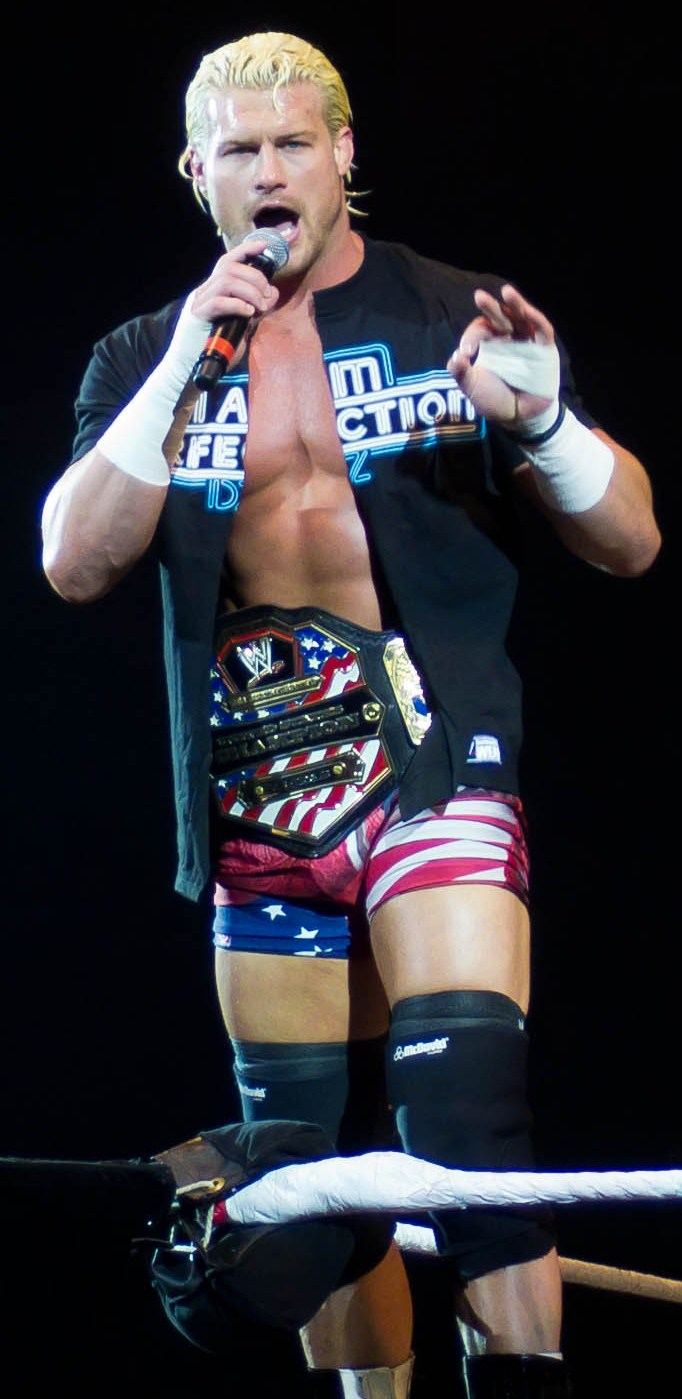
In 2011, Ziggler won the WWE United States Championship

Ziggler successfully retained the Intercontinental Championship at TLC: Tables, Ladders and Chairs on December 19 in a three-way ladder match against Kingston and Jack Swagger. While he lost the title to Kingston at SmackDown on January 4, 2011 ending his reign at 160 days, he won the World Heavyweight Championship from Edge on the February 14 episode of SmackDown, but lost it to Edge that same night.

The next month, Ziggler was introduced as the newest member of the Raw roster with Guerrero. Ziggler, Guerrero, and LayCool then feuded with Morrison, Trish Stratus, and Jersey Shore guest star Snooki, culminating in a mixed tag team match at WrestleMania XXVII on April 3, which Ziggler and his team lost.

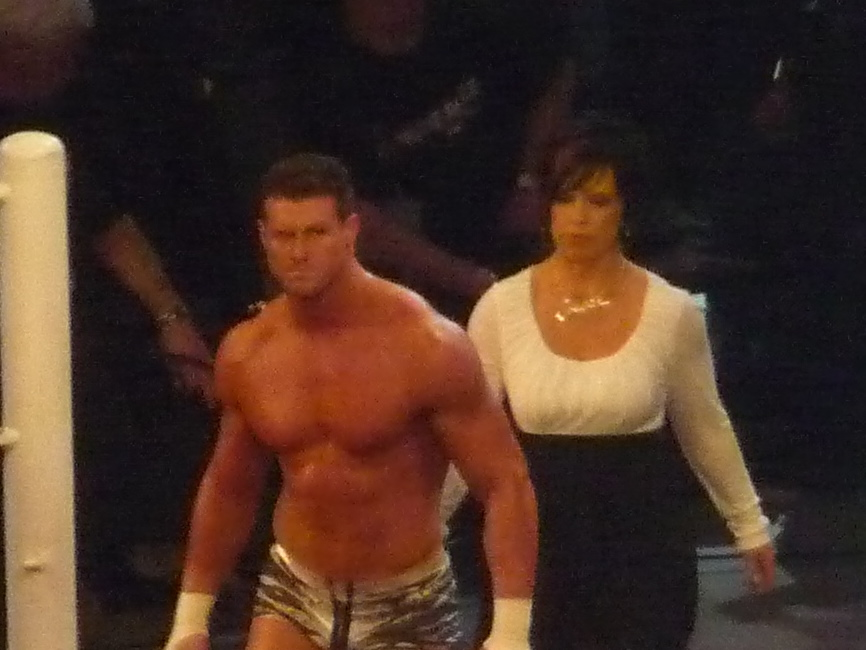
In 2011, Ziggler teased a new look with brown hair

At Capitol Punishment, Ziggler defeated Kingston via a sleeper hold submission to earn his first WWE United States Championship. Ziggler held the title for 182 days, defending the championship on several PPVs like Night of Champions, Vengeance, and Survivor Series, until he lost it to Zack Ryder at TLC: Tables, Ladders and Chairs. During his reigns, Guerrero also managed Jack Swagger. At

Starting in 2012, Ziggler faced CM Punk for the WWE Championship three times, but didn't win the title.

On the March 19 Raw SuperShow, Ziggler and Swagger were announced as the newest members of Team Johnny for the 12-man tag team match at WrestleMania XXVIII and on the April 2 Raw SuperShow, Ziggler and Swagger unsuccessfully challenged Santino Marella for the United States Championship in a triple threat match. After the match, Ziggler began a feud with Brodus Clay, who attacked Ziggler with a headbutt after he and Swagger tried to attack Marella. On the following episode of Raw SuperShow, Ziggler and Swagger were defeated by Clay and Marella in a tag team match. In the following weeks, Ziggler and Swagger lost to Clay and Hornswoggle in singles and tag matches. At Extreme Rules on April 29, Ziggler was again defeated by Clay. Ziggler and Swagger unsuccessfully challenged Kofi Kingston and R-Truth for WWE Tag Team Championship, first at Over the Limit on May 20 and second on the May 28 episode of Raw SuperShow, resulting in Ziggler showing signs of wanting to break away from Guerrero and Swagger.

On the June 11 episode of Raw SuperShow, Ziggler defeated The Great Khali, Swagger and Christian in a fatal four-way elimination match to become the number one contender to the World Heavyweight Championship, but at No Way Out on June 17, Ziggler lost the title match to champion Sheamus. On the following Raw SuperShow, Guerrero, finally tired of the bickering between Ziggler and Swagger, arranged for a match between them; Ziggler won the match and Guerrero's affections, ending their partnership. Ziggler received another shot at the World Heavyweight Championship on the June 29 SmackDown, but was again defeated by Sheamus in a triple threat match, also involving Alberto Del Rio.

==== World Heavyweight Champion (2012–2013) ====
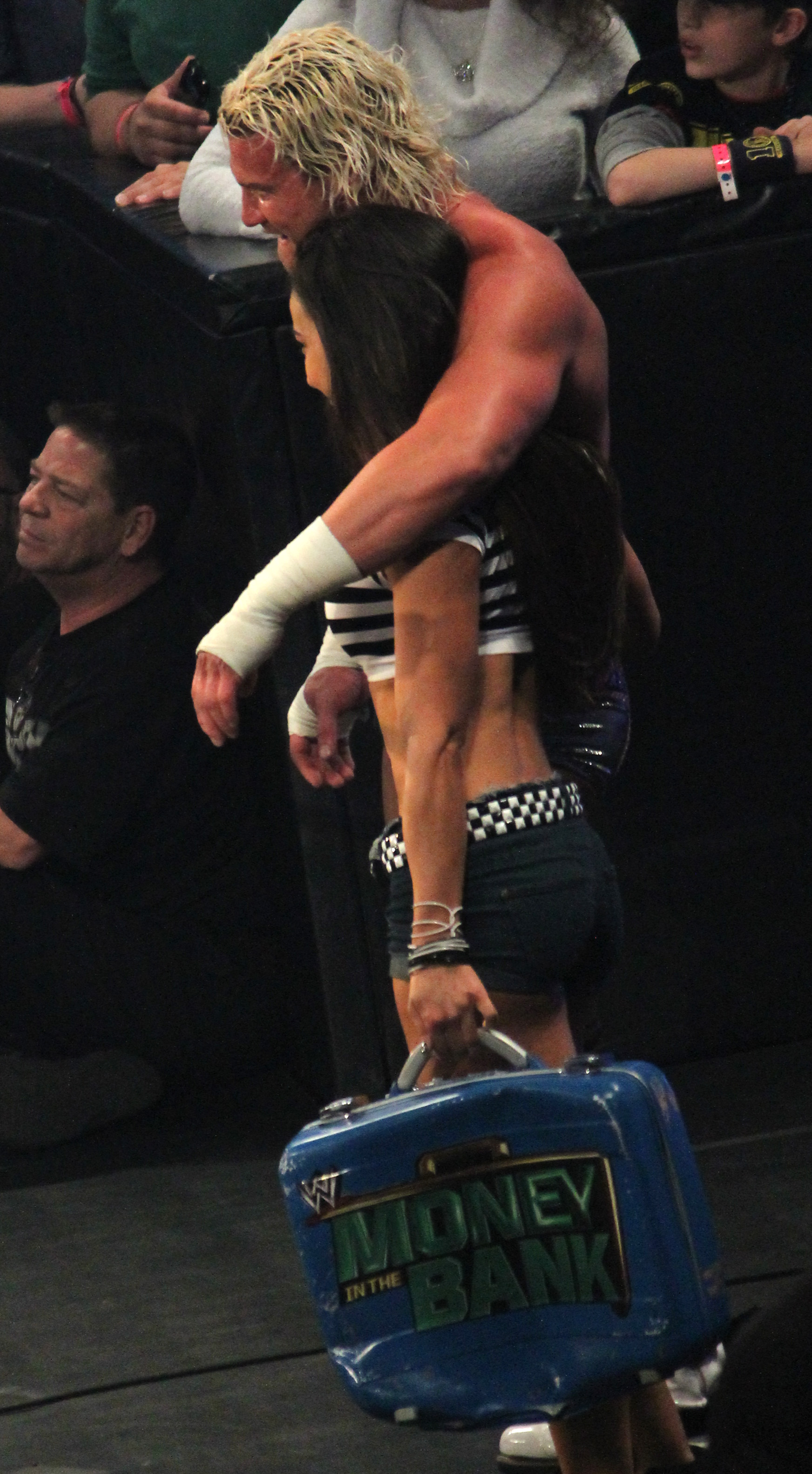
Ziggler with AJ Lee and his Money in the Bank briefcase in February 2013

At the Money in the Bank pay-per-view, Ziggler won the Money in the Bank ladder match to guarantee him the opportunity to challenge for the World Heavyweight Championship at a time of his choosing within the next year. The night after SummerSlam, Ziggler defeated Jericho in a rematch; as a result Ziggler retained his Money in the Bank contract and Jericho's WWE contract was terminated. He also was defeated by Randy Orton at Night of Champions on September 16. On November 18 at Survivor Series, Ziggler captained the traditional 5-on-5 elimination tag team match opposite Mick Foley and won the match by last pinning Orton, making him the sole survivor of the match.

Ziggler then began feuding with John Cena after he sided with Vickie Guerrero to help defame Cena and AJ Lee by alleging they had a romantic relationship. On December 16 at TLC: Tables, Ladders and Chairs, Ziggler retained his Money in the Bank briefcase in a ladder match after AJ interfered and turned on Cena. Ziggler began to work with Lee as his manager instead of Guerrero and also joined the debuting Big E Langston. Ziggler ended 2012 having wrestled the second most TV/PPV matches that year with 90; however, he had the most TV/PPV losses with 57. Ziggler ended his feud with Cena after losing to him on the January 14, 2013, episode of Raw, in a steel cage match. At Royal Rumble, Ziggler entered at number one and resumed his feud with Jericho, who started at number two.

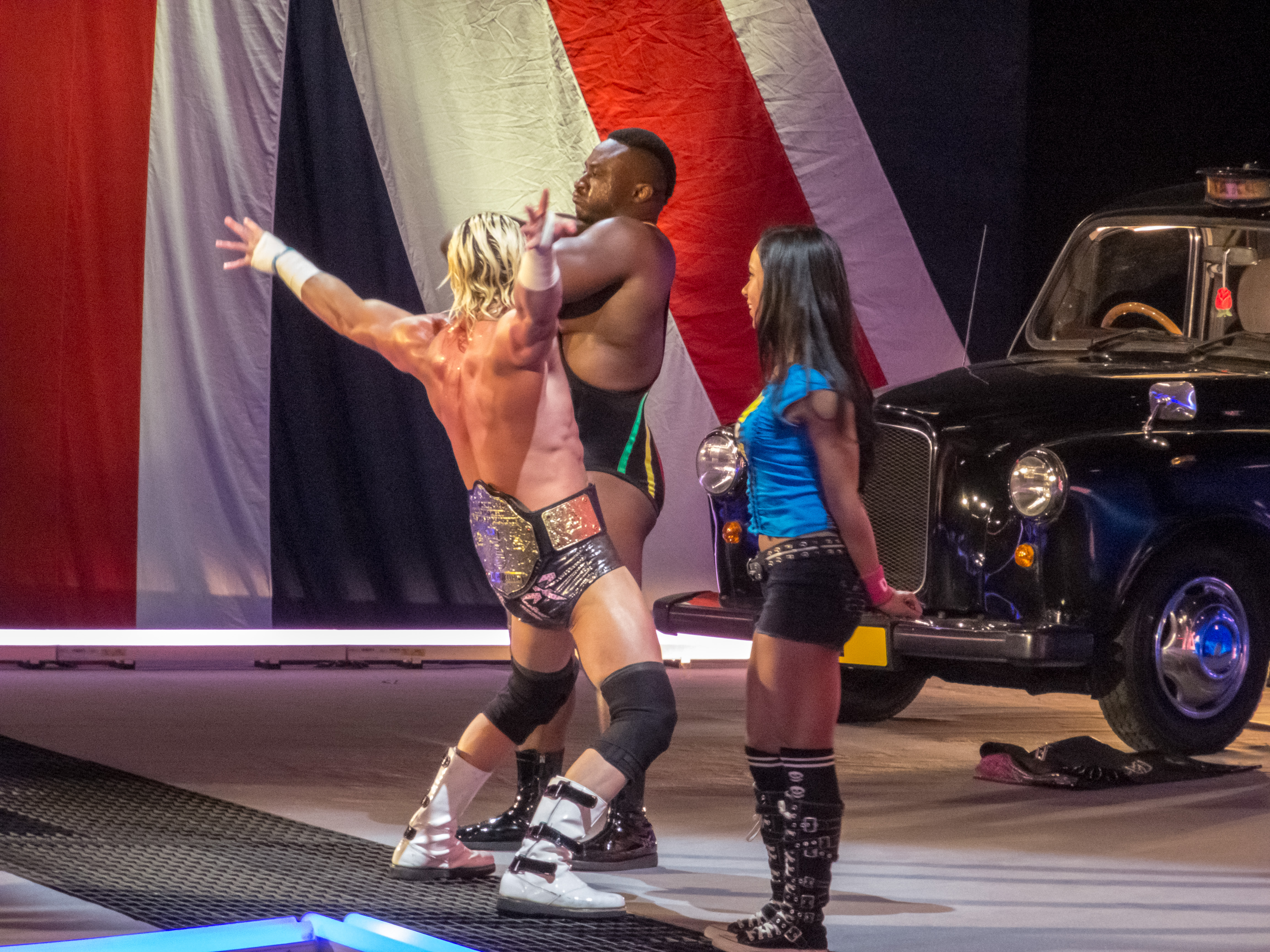
Ziggler as World Heavyweight Championship making his entrance with AJ Lee and Big E Langston

Ziggler cashed in his Money in the Bank contract on April 8 on an injured Alberto Del Rio to win his second World Heavyweight Championship. After gaining the World Heavyweight Championship, Ziggler began feuding with Del Rio and Jack Swagger over the title. Ziggler was originally booked to face Del Rio and Swagger in a three-way ladder match at Extreme Rules on May 19; however, Ziggler suffered a legitimate concussion at a SmackDown taping, thus removing their match from the pay-per-view and resulting in Ziggler being absent from television for a month. On June 16 at Payback, Ziggler faced Del Rio in his first title defense of the World Heavyweight Championship and during the match, a double turn took place; Ziggler turned face by displaying a never-say-die attitude while Del Rio turned heel by repeatedly and ruthlessly targeting his head to take advantage of his concussion, win the match, and end Ziggler's reign at 69 days. On July 14 at Money in the Bank, AJ cost Ziggler his title rematch against Alberto Del Rio, after she prematurely snuck into the ring and hit Del Rio with her own title, prompting a disqualification.

On the following Raw, Ziggler ended his relationship with AJ due to her actions the previous night and AJ exacted revenge by costing Ziggler a non-title match against Del Rio, then she attacked Ziggler and unleashed Langston on him. On the July 29, 2013, episode of Raw, Ziggler defeated Big E Langston via disqualification after AJ Lee attacked Ziggler. In a rematch on the following week, Ziggler was defeated by Langston after a distraction by AJ and Kaitlyn. This led to the host of SummerSlam, The Miz creating a mixed tag team match at SummerSlam on August 18, where Ziggler and Kaitlyn defeated Big E and AJ.

==== Feud with The Authority (2013–2015) ====
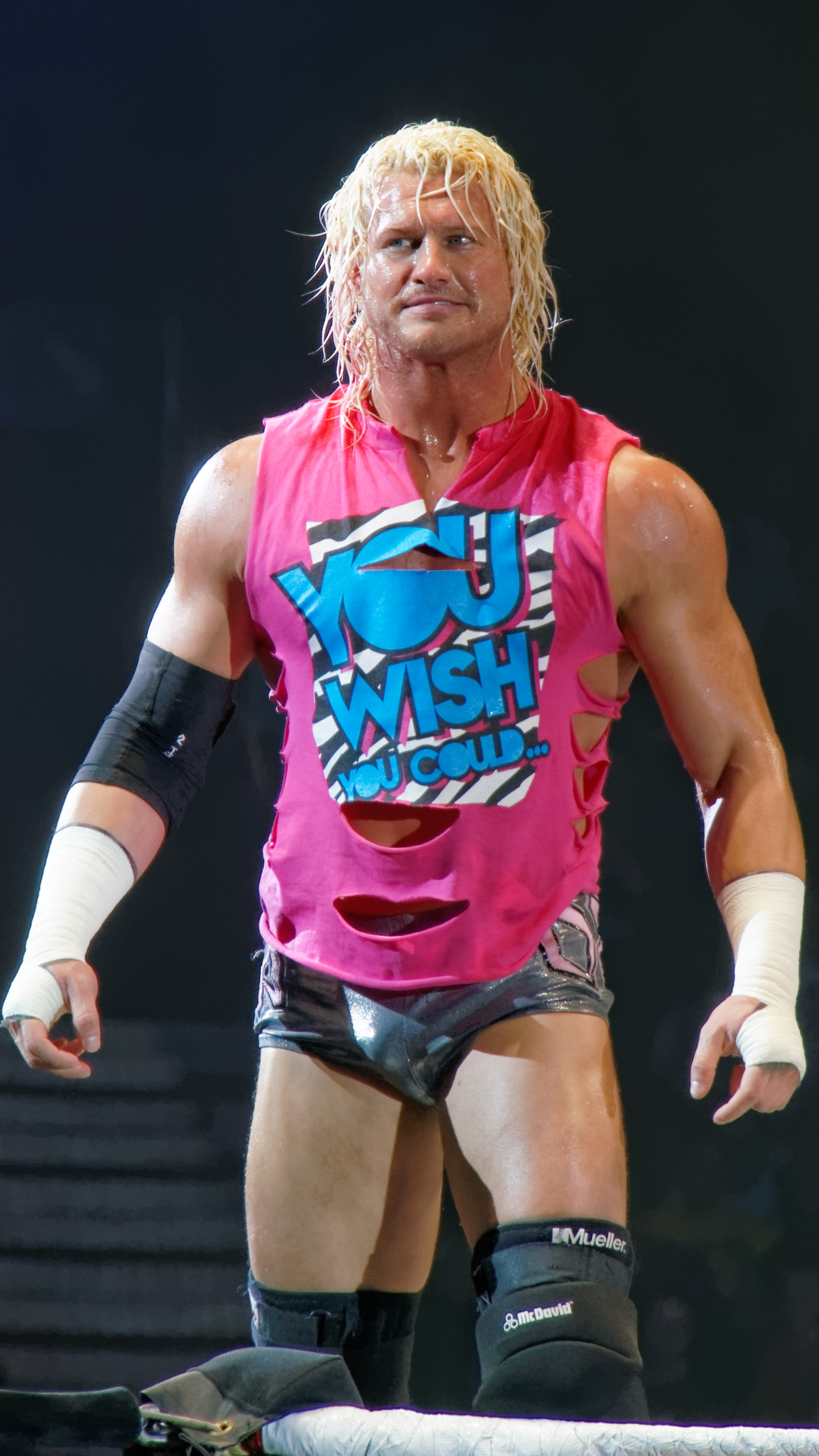
Ziggler posing at the ring during a WWE house show in November 2013

Ziggler was later unsuccessful in capturing the United States Championship, when he lost to Dean Ambrose at Night of Champions on September 15 and on the October 16 episode of Main Event, ending their feud. After that rivalry was over, Ziggler lost several matches during the late-2013 calendar year when he also failed to win the Intercontinental Championship from Curtis Axel on the November 11 episode of Raw. In December, Ziggler lost two number one contender matches for the Intercontinental Championship, first to Damien Sandow and later to Fandango.

At the Royal Rumble on January 26, 2014, Ziggler entered the Royal Rumble match, but was eliminated by Roman Reigns. On April 6 at WrestleMania XXX, Ziggler competed in the 31-man Andre the Giant Memorial Battle Royal, but was eliminated by Alberto Del Rio. On June 29 at Money in the Bank, Ziggler competed in the Money in the Bank ladder match for a WWE World Heavyweight Championship contract, but the match was won by Seth Rollins. Ziggler later competed in a Battle Royal for the vacant Intercontinental Championship on July 20 at Battleground; however, he was abruptly eliminated from behind by The Miz. After Ziggler defeated Miz in a non-title match the following night on Raw, he received a rematch at SummerSlam on August 17, where he defeated Miz to win the championship for a second time. The next night on Raw, Ziggler successfully retained his title against Miz, after he was counted out. At Night of Champions on September 21, Ziggler dropped the title to Miz, only for Ziggler to win it back the following night on Raw. Ziggler then retained the championship against Cesaro on September 26 episode of SmackDown, in a triple threat match against Cesaro and Miz the next week on Raw and at Hell in a Cell on October 26 against Cesaro in a 2-out-of-3 falls match.

Dolph Ziggler, the 2011 winner... has been the victim of as many stop-and-start pushes of anyone in history. The crowds always get behind him for the start, no matter how many false teases there are, and then a few weeks later, the company always takes him back down.

— —Dave Meltzer on Ziggler placing fourth for the 2014 Wrestling Observer Newsletter awards for Most Underrated.

On the October 28, 2014, episode of Raw, Ziggler and John Cena shook hands together backstage, which The Authority interpreted as a deal to plot against them. As a result, Ziggler was put in a match against Kane, which Ziggler won. Ziggler then joined Team Cena at Survivor Series. On the November 10 episode of Raw, Ziggler was brutally attacked by the returning Luke Harper. The following week, Harper was awarded a title match against Ziggler, which Harper won with assistance from The Authority, ending Ziggler's reign at 56 days. At Survivor Series on November 23, Ziggler emerged as the sole survivor for a second time. Ziggler contributed to Rusev being counted out, then after all his teammates were eliminated, he pinned Kane and Luke Harper. Triple H twice prevented Ziggler from pinning final opponent Seth Rollins, but the debuting Sting provided an assist to help Ziggler win the match, thus ousting the Authority from power. At TLC on December 14, Ziggler defeated Harper in a ladder match to win his fourth Intercontinental Championship. On the December 16 episode of SmackDown, Ziggler finally defeated Seth Rollins in a singles match after failing numerous times before. Three days later, Rolling Stone named Ziggler as the 2014 WWE Wrestler of the Year. On the first Raw of 2015 (dated January 5), the recently reinstated Authority forced Ziggler to defend his Intercontinental Championship against Bad News Barrett and he initially won. After Barrett then attacked and injured Ziggler's shoulder, Kane declared the match as two-out-of-three falls; Barrett proceeded to defeat Ziggler for the title after Kane distracted him. Later that night, Ziggler alongside Ryback and Erick Rowan were fired by the Authority.

On the January 19 episode of Raw, Sting provided another assist, as John Cena won Ziggler, Ryback, and Rowan's jobs back. Ziggler returned to television on the next SmackDown and qualified for the Royal Rumble match by beating Barrett in a non-title match. In the Royal Rumble match on January 25, Ziggler entered as the last entrant, eliminating Bad News Barrett and Cesaro but was quickly eliminated by Big Show and Kane. At Fastlane on February 22, Ziggler competed together with Rowan and Ryback in a six-man tag team match against Rollins, Big Show and Kane, which they lost. On the March 5 episode of SmackDown, Ziggler was announced as a participant in the 7-man ladder match for the Intercontinental Championship at WrestleMania 31 on March 29, which was won by Daniel Bryan.

==== Storyline with Lana and Rusev (2015–2016) ====
Between March and June, Ziggler feuded with Sheamus, facing him in a Kiss Me Arse match at Extreme Rules and at Payback, while also participated in the Elimination Chamber match for the vacated Intercontinental Championship at Elimination Chamber and the Money in the Bank ladder match at Money in the Bank, which was won by Sheamus.

They've 50/50ed the roster to death to the point where no one is over. Dolph Ziggler's character is dead. He used to get a great pop coming out, but now the fans are conditioned to know that he's gone as far as he'll ever go, so they sit on their hands when his music hits now.

— —Mike Tedesco, writing for WrestleView.com in 2015, describing Ziggler's slump into irrelevance

Ziggler became involved in an on-screen love affair with Lana, the former manager of Rusev, when she kissed him at Raw on May 25, with Lana serving as Ziggler's valet during his matches. In June, after Ziggler and Lana confirmed their storyline relationship, Summer Rae allied with Rusev to even the odds. After an attack by Rusev, Ziggler suffered a bruised trachea in storyline, which was to give him some time off to film a new WWE Studios movie, titled 6:42. While Ziggler and Rusev match at SummerSlam ended in a double countout due to interference from Lana and Rae, Ziggler won the rematch at Night of Champions, but the storyline was cancelled after TMZ reported the real–life engagement of Rusev and Lana.

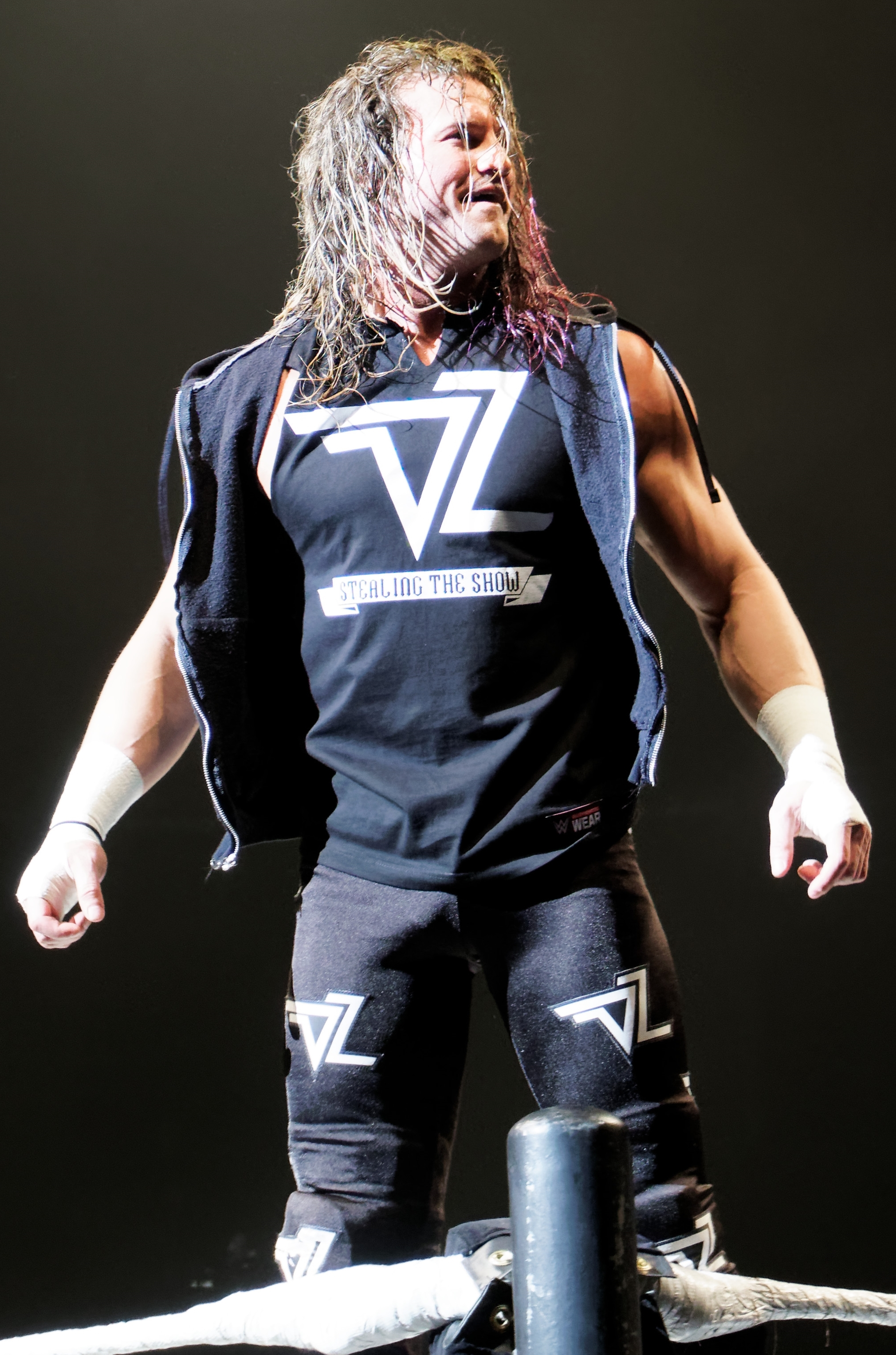
Ziggler in April 2016

On the October 22 episode of SmackDown, Ziggler started a feud with the debuting Tyler Breeze, who aligned with Summer Rae and attacked Ziggler. Ziggler entered a tournament for the vacant WWE World Heavyweight Championship, defeating The Miz in the first round match before being eliminated by Dean Ambrose. Ziggler and Breeze continued their feud, which culminated in a match between the two at Survivor Series on November 22, which Ziggler lost. Ziggler would then enter a feud with Kevin Owens with the pair trading victories throughout the rest of December and beginning of 2016. Ziggler entered the Royal Rumble on January 24 as the 28th entrant, lasting 7 minutes, but was eliminated by the eventual winner, Triple H. The next night on Raw, Ziggler faced Kevin Owens in a losing effort, but defeated him the following two weeks in a row. On the February 15 Raw, Ziggler was involved in a fatal five-way match for the Intercontinental Championship, where Owens regained the title after pinning Tyler Breeze. At Fastlane on February 21, Ziggler challenged Owens to a match for the Intercontinental Championship, which he lost. In the following weeks, Ziggler began to re-ignite his feud with The Authority, and on the March 14 episode of Raw, he confronted Triple H and Stephanie McMahon. This resulted in Ziggler being granted a match against Triple H where if he won, he could pick his match at WrestleMania (excluding the WWE World Heavyweight Championship match); however, Ziggler lost. At WrestleMania 32 on April 3, Ziggler competed against Kevin Owens, Sami Zayn, The Miz, Stardust, Sin Cara and Zack Ryder in a ladder match for the Intercontinental Championship, which Ryder won.

After WrestleMania 32, Ziggler went to a double countout with Baron Corbin on the April 4 episode of Raw, leading to Corbin hitting an End of Days outside of the ring to Ziggler, igniting a feud in the process. At the Payback pre-show on May 1, Ziggler faced Baron Corbin in a winning effort. The two then had a no disqualification match at Extreme Rules on May 22 where Corbin won after hitting a low blow on Ziggler. Following Extreme Rules, on the May 23 episode of Raw, Ziggler had a confrontation backstage with Corbin and challenged him to a technical wrestling match the next week. In that match, Ziggler intentionally got himself disqualified when he kicked Corbin in the groin immediately after the match began. This led to a rubber match at Money in the Bank on June 19, which Corbin won to end their feud.

==== Championship reigns (2016–2018) ====
On July 19 at the 2016 WWE draft, Ziggler was drafted to SmackDown. Working on SmackDown, he reignited his feud with The Miz over the Intercontinental Championship, failing to capture the title at Backlash. At No Mercy, Ziggler won the title in a match where he would have to retire if he lost, but lost it 37 days later against The Miz on the 900th episode of SmackDown. The feud culminated in a Ladder match at the TLC: Tables, Ladders, & Chairs in what was advertised as their final match, where Ziggler was defeated. Ziggler also wrestled for the WWE World Championship over the year, but was defeated by Dean Ambrose at SummerSlam, and by AJ Styles on SmackDown.

After Ziggler turned heel in 2017, in August he mocked the entrances of wrestlers such as John Cena, Naomi, Shawn Michaels and Randy Savage. He won his second United States Championship at Clash of Champions, but the title was vacated weeks later. Ziggler returned at the Royal Rumble on January 28, 2018, as the surprise #30 entrant in the men's Royal Rumble match. He would be involved at Fastlane on March 11 in a six pack challenge for the WWE Championship, where the champion AJ Styles retained.

==== Alliance with Drew McIntyre (2018–2019) ====
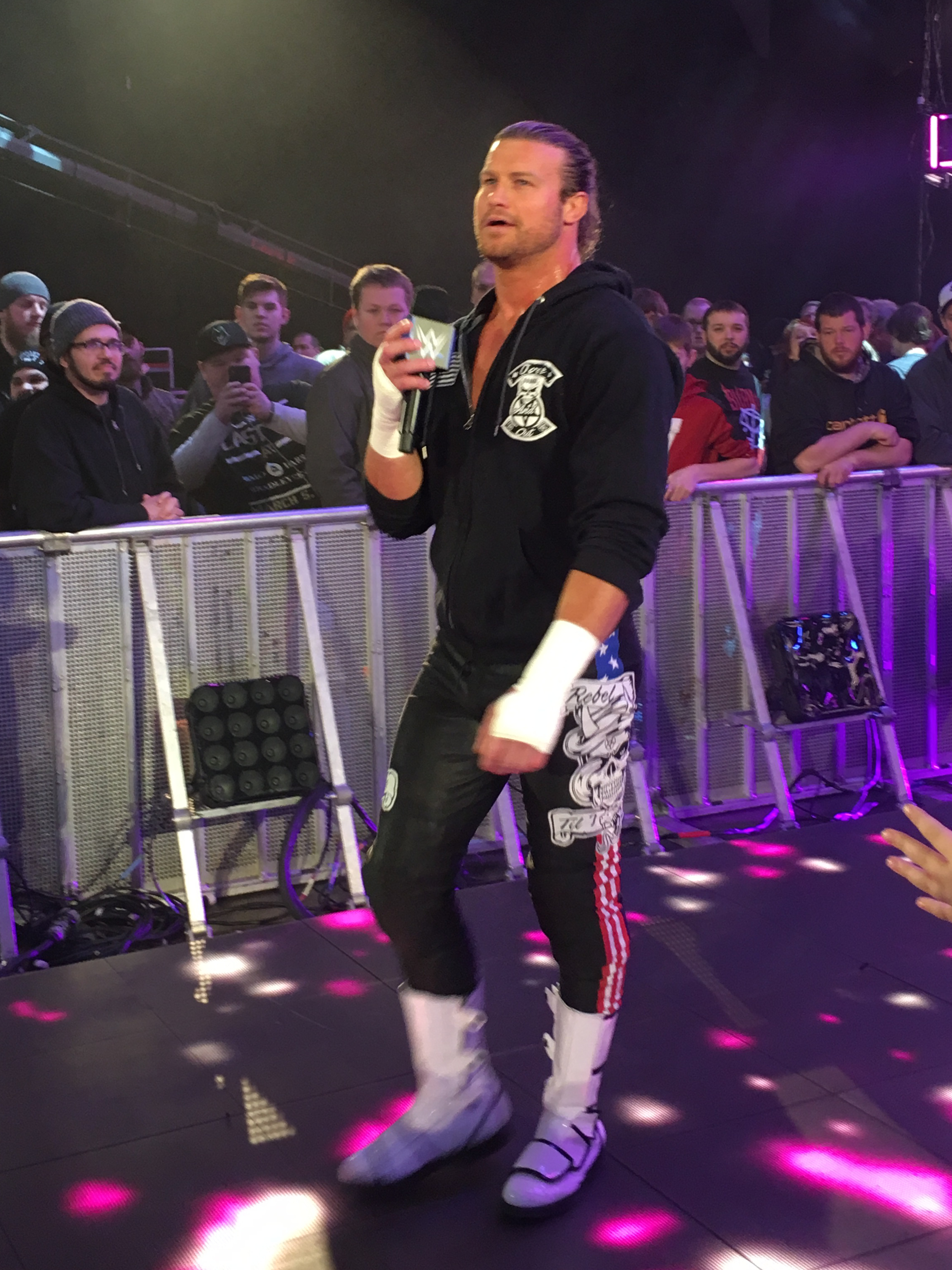
Ziggler in March 2018

On April 16, Ziggler was moved to Raw as part of the Superstar Shake-up, and he began to work with Drew McIntyre as tag team. On the June 18 episode of Raw, Ziggler answered Seth Rollins' open challenge for the Intercontinental Championship and defeated Rollins to capture the title for a sixth time. After weeks of McIntyre assisting Ziggler in all situations, including Extreme Rules on July 15 where Ziggler defeated Rollins 5–4 in sudden death overtime of a 30-Minute Iron Man match, Dean Ambrose returned on the August 13 episode of Raw to even the odds for Rollins. At SummerSlam on August 19, Ziggler lost the championship to Rollins, who had Ambrose in his corner.

On the September 3 episode of Raw, Ziggler and McIntyre temporarily formed a stable with Braun Strowman known as "The Dogs of War" to combat the newly reunited The Shield (Roman Reigns, Seth Rollins and Dean Ambrose). Later that night, they won the Raw Tag Team Championship by defeating The B-Team (Bo Dallas and Curtis Axel). They then successfully defended their titles at Hell in a Cell on September 16 against Rollins and Ambrose. At the Super Show-Down event on October 6, Ziggler teamed with McIntyre and Strowman in a losing effort to The Shield in a six-man tag team match. Over the next two weeks, the respective groups faced each other again on Raw, with The Dogs of War winning the first match, but losing the latter after Ziggler got pinned by Ambrose. During both matches, tensions arose between Ziggler, McIntyre and Strowman, who felt he was carrying the group. After losing the last match, Strowman turned on Ziggler and attacked him, before being attacked by McIntyre.

Ziggler and McIntyre lost the Raw Tag Team Championship to Rollins and Ambrose on the October 22 episode of Raw after interference from Braun Strowman. On the December 3 episode of Raw, the alliance between Ziggler and McIntyre ended when McIntyre claimed that Ziggler was "a means to an end to get him into a prominent position" and ended their association. The two later faced each other in a match which Ziggler won after interference from Finn Bálor. After the three men had traded wins among each other and interfered in each other's matches over the next few weeks, McIntyre defeated Ziggler in a cage match on the December 31 episode of Raw.

After this, Ziggler was off television until his appearance at the Royal Rumble match at the titular event on January 27, 2019, as participant number 28, eliminating McIntyre and lasting until the final three, before being eliminated by Braun Strowman. He would then disappear again from WWE television without notice due to a stand-up comedy tour that started following the Royal Rumble.

==== The Dirty Dawgs (2019–2022) ====
After a four-month hiatus, Ziggler returned on the May 21 episode of SmackDown Live, attacking WWE Champion Kofi Kingston. Ziggler failed to win the title from Kingston at Super ShowDown on June 7 and Stomping Grounds on June 23 in a steel cage match, ending their long-time feud. At Extreme Rules on July 14, he lost to Kevin Owens in only 17 seconds and failed to win the WWE Championship from Kingston in a triple threat match also including Samoa Joe at Smackville on July 27. On the July 23 episode of SmackDown Live, Ziggler interrupted Miz TV featuring Shawn Michaels and attacked Michaels and The Miz. This led to a match against Goldberg at SummerSlam on August 11, being defeated in a short match.

On the August 26 episode of Raw, Ziggler teamed with Robert Roode to win a tag-team turmoil match, earning a Raw Tag Team Championship match at Clash of Champions. At the event on September 15, Ziggler and Roode won the titles from Seth Rollins and Braun Strowman. On the October 14 episode of Raw, Ziggler and Roode lost the titles to The Viking Raiders (Erik and Ivar), ending their reign at 29 days, and they were drafted to the SmackDown brand as part of the 2019 WWE Draft. At Survivor Series on November 24, Ziggler and Roode won a 10-team Interbrand Tag Team Battle Royal. In the following weeks, they aligned themselves with King Corbin during his feud against Roman Reigns. On January 26, 2020, at the Royal Rumble, Ziggler entered the Royal Rumble match at number 19, but was eliminated by Reigns. At Super ShowDown on February 27, Ziggler lost to Mansoor. At Elimination Chamber on March 8, Ziggler and Roode competed in the namesake match for the SmackDown Tag Team Championship, where the champions The Miz and John Morrison retained. In March, due to the outbreak of the COVID-19 pandemic, Roode was forced to stay in his native Canada, putting the team on hiatus.

At the same time, Ziggler entered a feud with Otis over the affections of Mandy Rose, using underhanded tactics to secure a Valentine's Day date and short-term relationship; however, this was soon exposed. On the second night of WrestleMania 36 on April 5, Ziggler lost to Otis. After a few more assaults and promos, the feud ended when Otis defeated Ziggler in a Money in the Bank qualifying match. On the June 22 episode of Raw, it was announced that Ziggler and Roode were traded to the Raw brand for A.J. Styles. On that night, Ziggler issued a challenge to WWE Champion Drew McIntyre, which McIntyre accepted for The Horror Show at Extreme Rules. At the event on July 19, Ziggler failed to win the title.

As part of the 2020 Draft in October, both Ziggler and Roode were drafted back to the SmackDown brand. On the January 8, 2021, episode of SmackDown, Ziggler and Roode defeated The Street Profits (Angelo Dawkins and Montez Ford) to win the SmackDown Tag Team Championship. They retained the titles until WrestleMania Backlash, where they lost the titles to Rey and Dominik Mysterio. They were drafted to the Raw brand in the 2021 Draft. On the October 25 episode of Raw, Ziggler and Roode defeated The Street Profits and Alpha Academy (Chad Gable and Otis) in a #1 contender's match for the Raw Tag Team Championship, facing the champions, RK-Bro (Randy Orton and Riddle) for the titles later that night in a losing effort. At Survivor Series on November 21, Ziggler participated in a 25-man dual-branded battle royal to commemorate the 25th anniversary of The Rock's debut at the 1996 Survivor Series, eliminating Mansoor before he was eliminated by AJ Styles. Ziggler competed in the Royal Rumble on January 29, 2022, entering at No. 16 but was eliminated by Bad Bunny and Rey Mysterio.

==== NXT Champion (2022–2023) ====
On the February 8 episode of NXT 2.0, Ziggler made a surprise appearance during a segment with Bron Breakker and Santos Escobar. At NXT Roadblock on March 8, Ziggler defeated Tommaso Ciampa and defending champion Breakker in a triple threat match to win the NXT Championship. The following week, he successfully defended his title against LA Knight. At Stand & Deliver on April 2, he retained the title against Breakker due to interference from Roode. However, on the April 4 episode of Raw, Ziggler lost his title to Breakker, ending his reign at 27 days.

On the July 11 episode of Raw, Ziggler helped Bobby Lashley and Matt Riddle against Seth "Freakin" Rollins and Theory's underhanded tactics during a tag team match, and after the match, Ziggler superkicked Theory, turning face for the first time since 2017. At the 2023 WWE Draft, he was undrafted. On the May 15 episode of Raw, Ziggler competed in a battle royal to determine the #1 contender for the Intercontinental Championship at Night of Champions, eliminating JD McDonagh, but would later get eliminated by Von Wagner. After getting eliminated, McDonagh would attack Ziggler, beginning a feud between the two. On the May 29 episode of Raw, Ziggler wrestled McDonagh, which ended in a double countout. McDonagh would once again attack Ziggler after the match. On September 21, 2023, it was announced that Ziggler was released by WWE, ending his 19-year tenure with the company.

==== One-night return (2025) ====
While being contracted to TNA, Ziggler returned to WWE as part of a one-off, as he entered John Cena's The Last Time Is Now Tournament on the November 17, 2025 episode of Raw, where he lost to Solo Sikoa in the first round.

=== Independent circuit (2023–present) ===
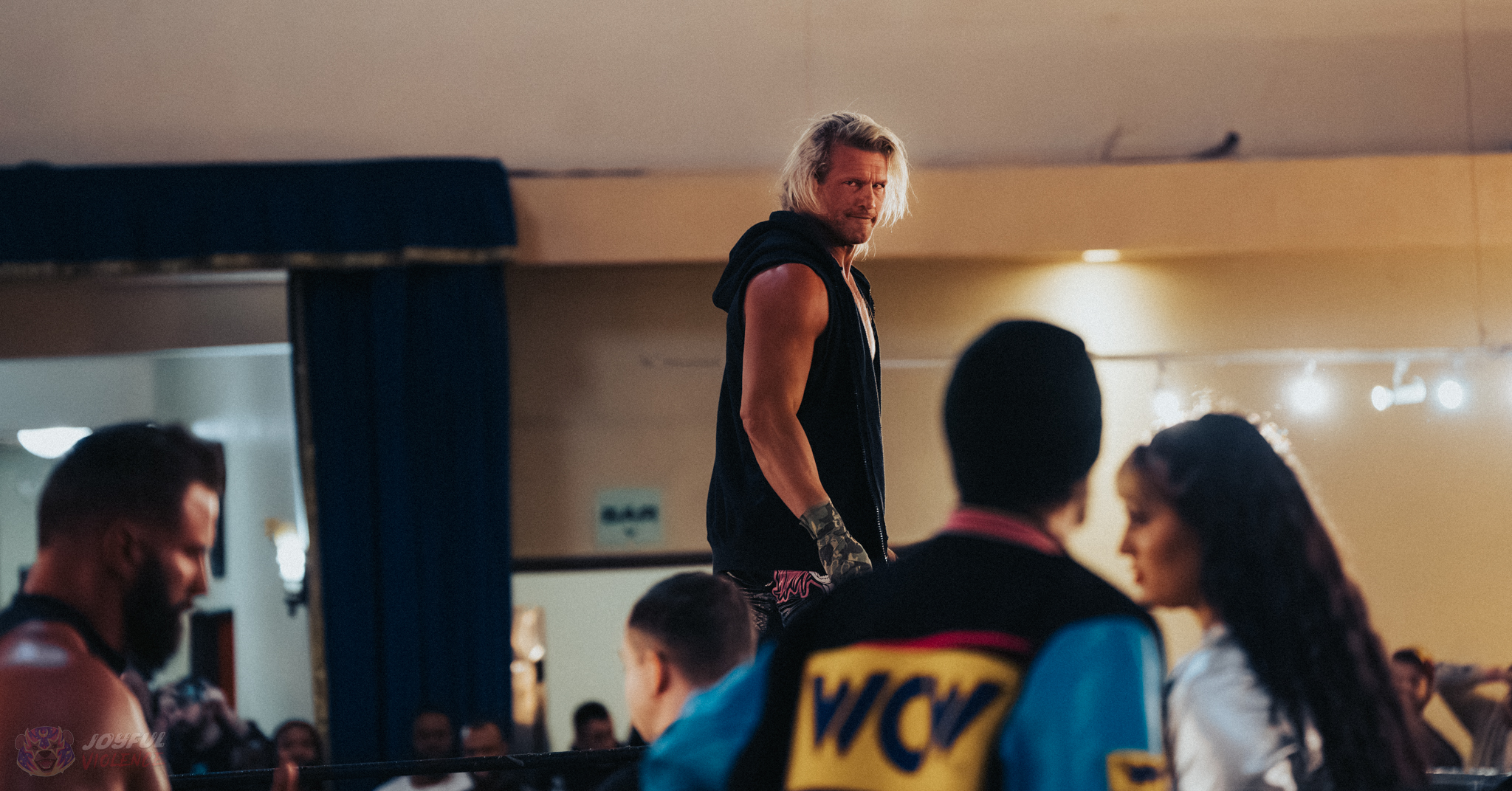
Nemeth before his match against Matt Cardona at GCW The Coldest Winter 2 in February 2024.

On December 10, 2023, Nemeth made his debut for World Wrestling Council (WWC) in Puerto Rico on January 20, 2024, against Ray González.

On February 3, 2024, Nemeth made his Game Changer Wrestling (GCW) debut during the promotion's Coldest Winter 2 pay-per-view in which he fought against Matt Cardona. On April 4, 2024, Nemeth competed in his first Bloodsport match at Josh Barnett's Bloodsport X against Mike Bailey.

On October 30, 2024, during the Devil's Night Creature Double Feature pay-per-view, Nemeth made his Juggalo Championship Wrestling debut where he defeated Kerry Morton.

On January 5, 2025, Nemeth made his Awesome Championship Wrestling debut at their first show Poughkeepsie Rumble, retaining his TNA Championship against Matt Riddle. He would also appear at Mischief Night, losing his bid for ACW Heavyweight Championship. At the next year's Poughkeepsie Rumble, Nemeth would lose a contendership against Mike Santana.

During the first night of the 2 Day War with GCW, Nemeth, representing JCW, attacked Atticus Cogar in the build-up to his match with Cogar the following night. On the second night of the 2 Day War, Nemeth was defeated by Cogar.. Nemeth made his Lunacy debut on the taping for the January 23, 2026 episode of Lunacy on December 21, 2025. where he competed in a three-way #1 contendership match for the JCW World Heavyweight Championship.

Due to Matt Cardona signing with WWE, resuting in him vacating the ACW Heavyweight Championship, Nemeth competed in a #1 contendership match for the title against Mike Santana during ACW's Poughkeepsie Rumble on January 3, 2026.

On March 22, 2026, during JCW's Panic Zone event, Nemeth competed in a two-on-one handicap match in which he defeated Kerry Morton and Shane Mercer. On the April 2, 2026 episode of Lunacy, Nemeth competed in a Deadly Resolution match in which he teamed up with Violent J, CoKane, and Mr. Anderson against Big Vito, Facade, and Steven Flowe for control of JCW. On April 17, 2026, during the Strangle-Mania: Viva Las Violence pay-per-view, Nemeth competed in a four-way elimination match for the JCW World Heavyweight Championship which featured CoKane defending the title against him, Matt Riddle, and Caleb Konley. On October 31, 2026, during Hallowicked, Nic Nemeth won the JCW World Heavyweight Championship after defeating Caleb Konley.

=== New Japan Pro-Wrestling (2024) ===
Nemeth made his debut for New Japan Pro-Wrestling (NJPW) at Wrestle Kingdom 18 on January 4, 2024, appearing ringside as a spectator along with his brother Ryan. Nemeth confronted the new IWGP Global Champion David Finlay, defeating him for the title at The New Beginning in Sapporo. Nemeth retained the title against Hiroshi Tanahashi on night 1 of Wrestling Dontaku, but lost it the next night back to Finlay, ending his reign at 71 days.

=== Total Nonstop Action Wrestling (2024–present) ===
Nemeth made his debut for Total Nonstop Action Wrestling (TNA) at the Hard To Kill PPV on January 13, 2024, confronting the new TNA World Champion Moose. Nemeth's first rivalry in TNA was against Steve Maclin, defeating him at Sacrifice. Nemeth would move into a rivalry with Moose's new faction, The System. Nemeth challenged for Moose's TNA World Championship at Rebellion, in a losing effort. After being attacked by The System and not cleared to wrestle at Under Siege, Nemeth would team with his brother, Ryan Nemeth, to challenge The System's Eddie Edwards and Brian Myers for the TNA World Tag Team Championship at Against All Odds, but would be defeated, after interference from JDC.

At Slammiversary, Nemeth won a six-way to win the TNA World Championship. He would retain the title during the following months against Mustafa Ali on the August 1 episode of Impact!, Josh Alexander on the August 15 episode of Impact! and in a 60-minute Iron Man match at Emergence, Moose at Victory Road, Joe Hendry at Bound for Glory, Eddie Edwards at Turning Point, and A. J. Francis at Final Resolution.

At Genesis, Nemeth would lose his TNA World Championship to Joe Hendry, ending his first reign at 183 days. On March 14, 2025, at Sacrifice, Nic attacked Matt Hardy alongside his brother Ryan, turning heel in the process. The Nemeths would then go on to win the titles from the Hardys a month later at Rebellion, only to lose them back to the Hardys at Slammiversary. At Bound for Glory, Nemeth and Frankie Kazarian co won the Call Your Shot Gauntlet. He cashed his Call Your Shot title match at Slammiversary, where he defeated Mike Santana to become TNA World Champion for the second time. At Lockdown, Nic and his brother Ryan defeated Hardy Boyz for the tag title for second time. At Bound for Glory, Nemeth lost the title to Leon Slater, ending his second reign at 105 days.

=== Lucha Libre AAA Worldwide (2024) ===
On March 18, 2024, it was announced that Nemeth would make his debut for Lucha Libre AAA Worldwide (AAA) at Triplemanía XXXII: Monterrey, to face Alberto El Patron for the vacant AAA Mega Championship. At the event, Nemeth defeated El Patron to win the AAA Mega Championship. At the same event in Mexico City on August 17, accompanied by John Layfield, Nemeth lost the title to El Patron. On June 15, 2025, Nemeth teamed up with his brother Ryan Nemeth in a four-way tag team match for the AAA World Tag Team Championship against defending champions Nueva Generación Dinamita (Sansón and Forastero), Psycho Clown and Pagano, and Los Garza (Angel and Berto) during Triplemanía Regia III.

== Professional wrestling style and persona ==
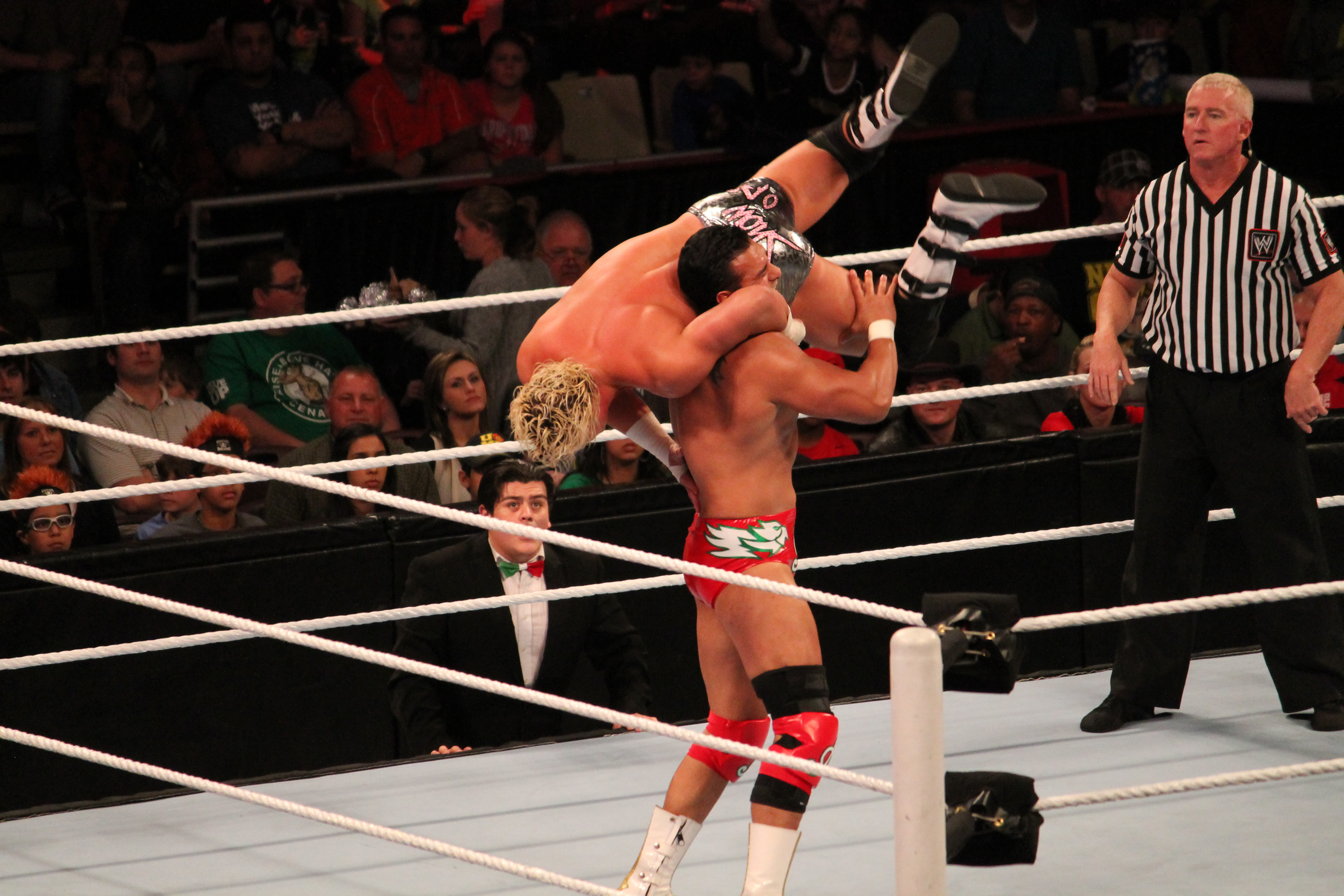
Ziggler performing a jumping DDT on Alberto Del Rio

Sports Illustrated described Nemeth as "phenomenal in the ring, with the ability to carry an entertaining match with practically anyone on the WWE roster" and added that his "mic work is top-notch... and there is a genuine believability in his work". He is also noted for his "elite" ability to sell for his opponents. Jim Cornette praised Nemeth and stated, "I knew he was a good athlete, [but] I never dreamed he was going to be the second coming of Curt Hennig."

Nemeth's most commonly utilized finishing maneuvers are a jumping reverse bulldog, known as the Zig Zag (now known as the Danger Zone), as well as a superkick. In the early run of his Dolph Ziggler character, he also used a sleeper hold as a submission finisher. While still in developmental, he also utilized a jumping reverse STO named Blonde Ambition. Due to his athleticism and intense showmanship, Nemeth has been referred to as "The Showstealer" and "The Showoff", while in his earlier career he was referred to as "The Natural". Upon teaming with Vickie Guerrero, he was nicknamed either "Blonde Ambition" or "Blonde Perfection". Consequently, his theme music was named "I Am Perfection" during this period of his career, while later on it was changed to "Here to Show the World."

In the early stages of his career, Nemeth was introduced to the audience as a sidekick with a caddie gimmick. This, however, lasted only a few weeks because Chavo Guerrero aborted his golfer gimmick after the death of his uncle Eddie Guerrero. While there were initial plannings within the company to give him a new gimmick based on his successful career in amateur wrestling and pair him with Kurt Angle, this idea never surfaced. Instead, his first longer-lasting gimmick became that of male cheerleader Nicky, where he was partnered with four other wrestlers as The Spirit Squad. To ensure their characters were believable, they trained with real cheerleaders and gymnasts. With this gimmick, he saw moderate success, winning the World Tag Team Championship once. After the disbanding of the Spirit Squad he was again sent back to developmental, where he and fellow Spirit Squad member Mike Mondo tweaked the gimmick into a jock and fraternity based new gimmick, now going by the name of "Frat Pack". He would continue this gimmick alongside Brad Allen and Gavin Spears, with whom he won the FCW Florida Tag Team Championship once each. In a 2020 interview, Nemeth voiced amusement as well as creative frustration towards his early gimmicks, stating that he tried to make them work, knowing they could only fail, just to break through in professional wrestling.

By 2008, Nemeth was repackaged as Dolph Ziggler, a bleached-blonde and self-absorbed narcissist. Debuting as a heel, Ziggler repeatedly declared himself as "perfection" and would display an extremely arrogant attitude, while at the same time using dirty tactics. When he turned face in 2013, his character shifted towards a man out to prove himself and never giving up. In September 2017, Ziggler would begin a new short-lived gimmick where he would come out to the entrance themes and dress as other popular wrestlers and legends to irritate the crowd. After that, his gimmick tweaked towards a whiny heel who believed he was destined for greatness, constantly blaming his bad luck or others for his lack of opportunity and would always come up short, culminating in his feud with Kofi Kingston in 2019, where he would blame Kingston (and later Drew McIntyre) for stealing his chance to become WWE champion while stating "it should've been me", whereas with McIntyre, he would also claim to be the one entirely responsible for McIntyre's success, stating that McIntyre is successful "because of me".

== Stand-up comedy ==
Nemeth grew up as a fan of comedians such as Johnny Carson, Dana Carvey, Phil Hartman, Jan Hooks, Jon Lovitz, Brian Regan, Adam Sandler, and George Wallace. He decided to start performing comedy around the year 2010. He performed stand-up comedy for the first time in a small Los Angeles venue in 2013, and began getting offers to perform at various comedy clubs near WWE events. At this point, he had been studying comedy for almost a decade in preparation for a comedy career. He also began hosting a monthly improv comedy show called Flying Chuck alongside fellow professional wrestlers John Morrison and his brother Ryan Nemeth. A few years later, he started working as an opening act for his long-time friend Sarah Tiana. In July 2018, he appeared on Comedy Central's Roast Battle III to face off against Tiana.

In 2018, Nemeth pursued independent ventures as a stand-up comedian while still being employed by WWE. This led to him headlining shows close to the arenas for the 2018 SummerSlam and Survivor Series pay-per-views; he used the big WWE events to leverage his first major shows, due to there being a lot of wrestling fans in the area. Following the 2019 Royal Rumble event, he embarked on his first headlining tour from the end of January to the end of March. He took a break from WWE television to focus on the tour. He later continued the tour, announcing two shows in Texas taking place in late May.

== In other media ==
Nemeth appeared on the November 3, 2009, episode of Deal or No Deal with Maria Kanellis and Eve Torres. He also appeared on Lopez Tonight on August 9, 2010. Nemeth appeared in a 2011 episode of Silent Library alongside Chris Masters, Trent Baretta, JTG, Caylen Croft, and Curt Hawkins. Nemeth made regular appearances on fellow WWE wrestler Zack Ryder (now known as Matt Cardona)'s YouTube web series, Z! True Long Island Story, via his own segment named 'Ask Z Heel'.

On February 1, 2012, Nemeth debuted WWEFanNation's WWE Download and was the host of the YouTube series. The official WWE Download playlist on YouTube described the series as "Dolph Ziggler's sarcastic wit vs. your videos" and each episode consisted of Ziggler reviewing both viral and WWE videos. A new episode of WWE Download was uploaded every Monday until the show ended on January 28, 2013, after 53 episodes, but returned for one time only on September 30, 2014. In August 2013, Nemeth was cast by Max Landis to appear in the 2015 film Me Him Her.

From 2016 to 2017, Nemeth would appear in a series of ads advertising fast food joint KFC. In the ads, he dressed as KFC founder Colonel Sanders. The first ad notably had Nemeth cutting a promo on The Miz, who was dressed as a chicken. This led to a dark match where Nemeth, as Colonel Sanders, defeated Miz in a squash match.

Nemeth began appearing on the Fox Business Network program Kennedy hosted by Lisa Kennedy Montgomery in 2017. As of 2018, he has appeared on the show six to eight times.

=== Video games ===
Year	Title	Notes	Ref.
2009	WWE SmackDown vs. Raw 2010	Video game debut	
2010	WWE SmackDown vs. Raw 2011		
2011	WWE '12		
2012	WWE '13		
2013	WWE 2K14		
2014	WWE 2K15		
2015	WWE 2K16		
2016	WWE 2K17		
2017	WWE 2K18		
2018	WWE 2K19		
2019	WWE 2K20		
2020	WWE 2K Battlegrounds		
2022	WWE 2K22		
2023	WWE 2K23		

== Personal life ==
Nemeth has two brothers. His younger brother Ryan is also a professional wrestler whom he teams with in TNA. Ryan previously worked with both WWE in NXT under the ring name Briley Pierce in the former promotion, and in AEW. His other brother, Donald, was sentenced to 15 years in prison after pleading guilty to involuntary manslaughter, kidnapping, and robbery for his role in a botched robbery attempt that led to the murder of a former Marine in January 2016.

Nemeth is close friends with his former Spirit Squad teammates, particularly Michael Brendli, with whom he lived in Florida until 2008. He previously dated comedian Amy Schumer, who split up with him because she considered him "too athletic" during sex.

Nemeth also maintains a close friendship with another professional wrestler and former WWE talent, Ryback.

Nemeth is fluent in American Sign Language.

Nemeth is an avid supporter of his hometown football team Cleveland Browns.

== Filmography ==
Film
Year	Title	Role	Notes
2015	Me Him Her	—N/a	Film debut Uncredited
2015	Buddy Hutchins		
2016	Countdown	Ray Thompson	Direct-to-video
2017	The Jetsons & WWE: Robo-WrestleMania!	Dolph Ziggler Bot	Voice
2020	The Speed of Time	Orville	Credited as Nic Nemeth
2024	Drugstore June		

Television
Year	Title	Role	Notes
2009	Deal or No Deal	Guest Banker	Special edition of "WWE Week"
2010	Lopez Tonight	Himself	Episode 121
2011	Silent Library	Himself	Season 4, episode 62 "WWE Edition"
2014–2017	Total Divas	Himself	Guest (seasons 2–3 & 7); Recurring (seasons 4–6): 20 episodes
2017	@midnight with Chris Hardwick	Himself	Season 4, June 22, 2017
2017	Adam Ruins Everything	The Great Placeboni	Season 4, episode 13 "Adam Ruins Spa Day"
2018	Wild 'n Out	Guest	
2018	Jeff Ross Presents Roast Battle	Guest	
2018, 2022	Miz & Mrs.	Himself	4 episodes
2018	The Challenge	Himself	Reunion Host

Web Series
Year	Title	Role	Notes
2011–2013	Z! True Long Island Story	Himself	'Ask the Heel' segments
2012–2014	WWE Download	Host	
2013–2015	The JBL and Cole Show	Himself	Guest (Season 1), Recurring (Seasons 2–5)
2018	Well Done	Himself	1 episode

WWE Network Originals
Year	Title	Role	Notes
2015	Unfiltered with Renee Young	Himself	Interview show with Renee Young
2015	Table for 3	Himself	Three WWE Superstars share stories over dinner
2015–2016	Swerved	Himself	Hidden camera prank show
2016	WWE Ride Along	Himself	"Shipping Down from Boston"

== Championships and accomplishments ==
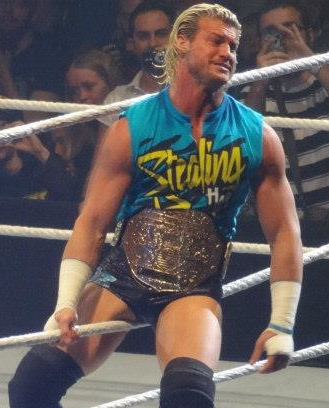
In WWE, Ziggler is a two-time WWE World Heavyweight Champion...

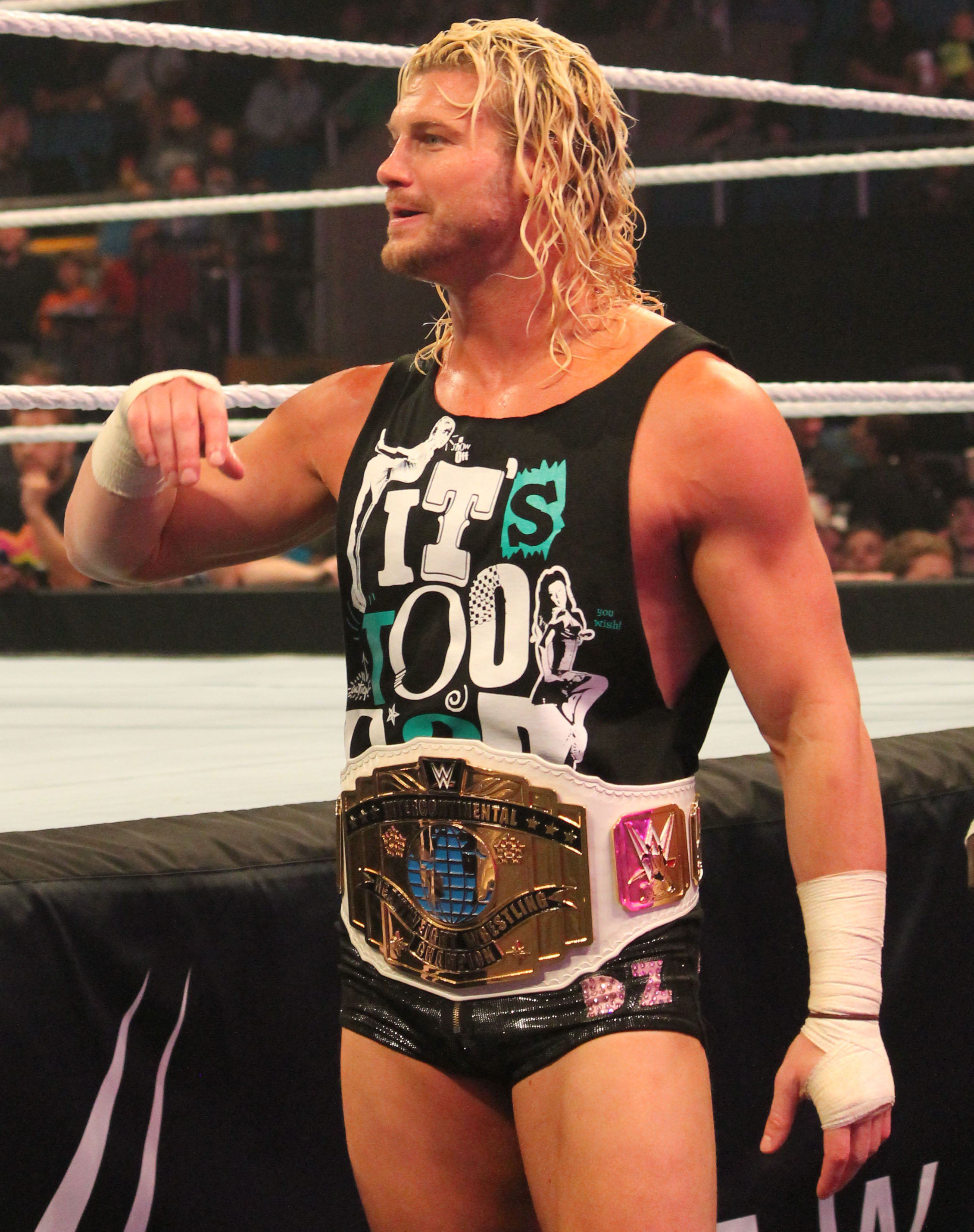
...a six-time WWE Intercontinental Champion...

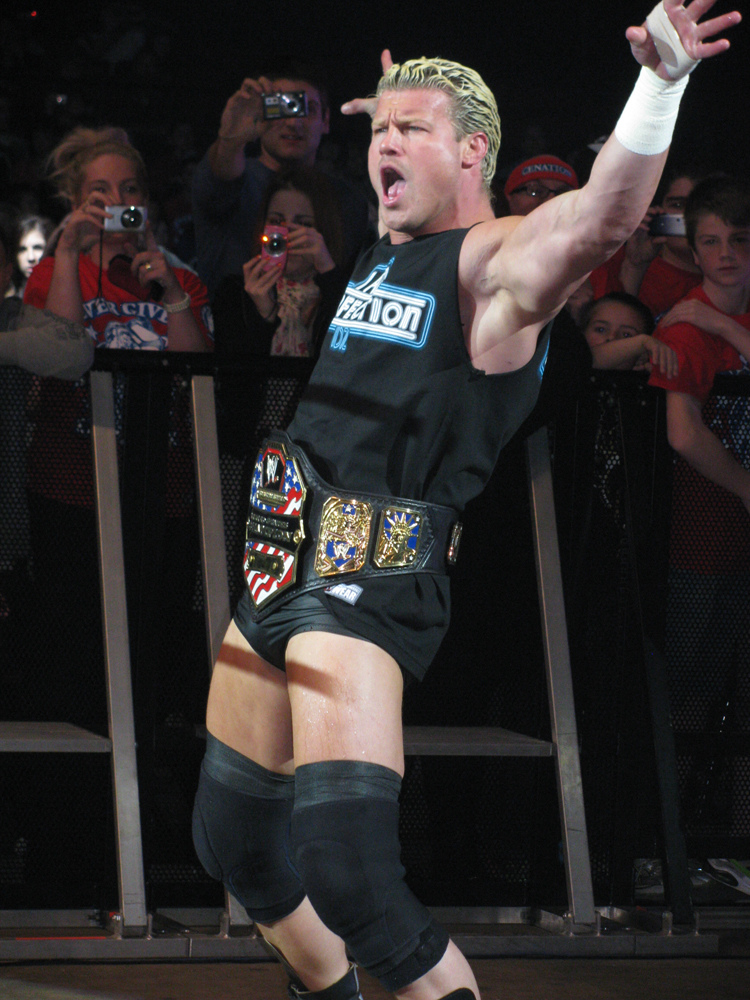
...and a two-time WWE United States Champion

- Appalachian Mountain Wrestling
  - AMW Heavyweight Championship (1 time)
- Florida Championship Wrestling
  - FCW Florida Tag Team Championship (2 times) – with Brad Allen (1) and Gavin Spears (1)
- George Tragos/Lou Thesz Professional Wrestling Hall of Fame
  - Class of 2026
- Liga Nacional de Lucha
  - LNL Maximum Championship (1 time, current)
- Juggalo Championship Wrestling
  - JCW World Heavyweight Championship (1 time, current)
- Lucha Libre AAA Worldwide
  - AAA Mega Championship (1 time)
- New Japan Pro-Wrestling
  - IWGP Global Heavyweight Championship (1 time)
- Pro Wrestling Illustrated
  - Ranked No. 9 of the top 500 singles wrestlers in the PWI 500 in 2013
- Pro Wrestling Society
  - PWS Korea Championship (1 time, current)
- Rolling Stone
  - Wrestler of the Year (2014)
  - Worst Storyline (2015) – with Rusev, Summer Rae and Lana
- Squared Circle Expo
  - SCX Championship (1 time)
- Total Nonstop Action Wrestling
  - TNA World Championship (2 times)
  - TNA World Tag Team Championship (2 times, current) – with Ryan Nemeth
  - Call Your Shot Gauntlet (2025)
- WrestleCrap
  - Gooker Award (2015) – feud with Rusev, Summer Rae and Lana
- Wrestling Observer Newsletter
  - Most Improved (2011)
  - Most Underrated (2011)
- World Series Wrestling
  - WSW World Heavyweight Championship (1 time)
- World Wrestling Entertainment/WWE
  - World Heavyweight Championship (2 times)
  - NXT Championship (1 time)
  - WWE Intercontinental Championship (6 times)
  - WWE United States Championship (2 times)
  - WWE Raw Tag Team Championship (2 times) – with Drew McIntyre (1) and Robert Roode (1)
  - WWE SmackDown Tag Team Championship (1 time) – with Robert Roode
  - World Tag Team Championship (1 time) – with Johnny, Kenny, Mikey, and Mitch (Note: Ziggler, as Nicky, defended the championship with either Kenny, Johnny, Mitch or Mikey under the Freebird Rule.)
  - Money in the Bank (2012 – World Heavyweight Championship contract)
  - 22nd Triple Crown Champion
  - Slammy Award (2 times)
    - Best Twitter Handle or Social Champion (2014) – @HEELZiggler
    - Match of the Year (2014) – Team Cena vs. Team Authority at Survivor Series

== Notes ==
Preceded by Daniel Bryan (WHC); Alberto Del Rio (WWEC)	Mr. Money in the Bank; 2012 (WHC); With: John Cena (WWEC)	Succeeded by Damien Sandow (WHC); Randy Orton (WWEC)
