= Josh Barnett's Bloodsport XIV =

2025 Game Changer Wrestling pay-per-view event

- Promotional poster
- Promotion: Game Changer Wrestling
- Date: August 2, 2025
- City: Rutherford, New Jersey
- Venue: Williams Center

Game Changer Wrestling event chronology
← Previous; Hit Em' Up	Next → Emo Fight

Bloodsport chronology
← Previous; XIII	Next → London

Josh Barnett's Bloodsport XIV was a professional wrestling pay-per-view event produced by Game Changer Wrestling (GCW). It was held on August 2, 2025, at the Williams Center in Rutherford, New Jersey in conjunction with GCW's SummerSmash Weekend during SummerSlam 2025 weekend. The show also featured wrestlers from WWE, All Elite Wrestling (AEW) and their sister promotion Ring of Honor, Total Nonstop Action Wrestling (TNA), and Major League Wrestling (MLW).

== Production ==
=== Background ===
Bloodsport is an annual professional wrestling event which features worked shoot matches in a style that mimics the early days of MMA and catch wrestling. It is common for Bloodsport competitors to have some experience in other combat sports and/or mixed martial arts, as well as professional wrestling, as these one on one matches often appear stiff and have a feel of a classic Shoot-style wrestling fights. The ropes and turnbuckles for the ring are often removed and replaced by a ring canvas with no ropes or turnbuckles. The first Bloodsport, titled Matt Riddle's Bloodsport, took place on April 5, 2019 in Kenner, Louisiana with Matt Riddle vs. Minoru Suzuki being the main event match. On August 18, 2018, Matt Riddle made his WWE debut and the promotion announced that they had signed him as a member of the NXT roster. Beginning in 2019, mixed martial arts fighter and professional wrestler Josh Barnett had taken over booking duties for the event which was renamed to Josh Barnett's Bloodsport. The first Bloodsport event to be booked By Josh Barnett took place on April 4, 2019 at in Jersey City, New Jersey in conjunction with the inaugural Collective.

On May 28, 2025, GCW announced that Josh Barnett's Bloodsport XIV would take place during GCW's inaugural SummerSmash Weekend event during SummerSlam 2025 weekend at the Williams Center in Rutherford, New Jersey alongside other events during the wekened including Juggalo Championship Wrestling's (JCW) Powder Keg and GCW's Emo Fight. On July 25, 2025, GCW announced that WWE wrestlers Pete Dunne and Charlie Dempsey would be competing during the event. On July 29, 2025, Josh Barnett announced that the War Raiders would be competing in the event.

=== Storylines ===
Josh Barnett's Bloodsport XIV featured professional wrestling matches that involves different wrestlers from pre-existing scripted feuds and storylines. Wrestlers portrayed villains, heroes, or less distinguishable characters in scripted events that built tension and culminated in a wrestling match or series of matches. Storylines were produced on Game Changer Wrestling's various pay-per-view events.

== Results ==
No.	Results	Stipulations	Times
1	Matt Mako defeated Ray Jaz by submission	Singles match	5:06
2	Janai Kai defeated Jordan Blade by knockout	Singles match	2:17
3	Simon Gotch defeated Nick Comoroto by submission	Singles match	6:43
4	Charlie Dempsey defeated Dominic Garrini by submission	Singles match	5:36
5	Royce Isaacs defeated Ivar (with Erik) by submission	Singles match	5:09
6	Timothy Thatcher defeated Slade by disqualification	Singles match	4:21
7	Erik (with Ivar) defeated 1 Called Manders by knockout	Singles match	6:20
8	Pete Dunne defeated Jonathan Gresham by submission	Singles match	10:48
9	Nattie Neidhart defeated Masha Slamovich by technical knockout	Singles match	7:03
