= GCW Bloodsport =

Game Changer Wrestling event series

- Promotions: Game Changer Wrestling
- First event: Matt Riddle's Bloodsport
- Last event: Josh Barnett's Bloodsport XV
- Signature matches: Ropeless ring mixed martial arts-style matches

GCW Bloodsport is a professional wrestling event held by the American promotion Game Changer Wrestling (GCW). Bloodsport usually takes place during the weekend of WWE's WrestleMania and SummerSlam events. This event consists of a unique ruleset compared to a traditional pro wrestling event, in that every match must end in either a knockout or submission. The traditional wrestling ring is replaced by a ring canvas with no ropes or turnbuckles.

This event features worked shoot matches in a style that mimics the early days of MMA and catch wrestling. It is common for Bloodsport competitors to have some knowledge in other combat sports and/or MMA, as well as professional wrestling, as these one on one matches often appear stiff and have a feel of a classic Shoot-style wrestling fights.

== History ==
The first event took place on 2018, under the name Matt Riddle's Bloodsport, where Minoru Suzuki defeated Riddle in the main event. The next year, the event was called Josh Barnett's Bloodsport, a name used until 2026, hosting a total of 14 events. In April 2026, Barnett announced the discontinuation of the concept, entering into an hiatus. However, on November 2026, GCW announced the return of the event without Barnett.

The origin of the idea is discussed. Both Riddle and Barnett take credit for the creation. Danny Demanto, however, pointed that neither Riddle or Barnett were part of the initial discussions of the event.

== Dates and venues ==
Event	Date	Location	Venue	Main event
Matt Riddle's Bloodsport	April 5, 2018	Kenner, Louisiana	Pontchartrain Convention & Civic Center	Minoru Suzuki vs. Matt Riddle
Josh Barnett's Bloodsport	April 4, 2019	Jersey City, New Jersey	White Eagle Hall	Josh Barnett vs. Minoru Suzuki
Josh Barnett's Bloodsport 2	September 14, 2019	Atlantic City, New Jersey	Showboat Resort Atlantic City	Josh Barnett vs. Chris Dickinson
Josh Barnett's Bloodsport 3	October 11, 2020	Indianapolis, Indiana	Marion County Fairgrounds Coliseum	Jon Moxley vs. Chris Dickinson
Josh Barnett's Bloodsport 4	February 13, 2021	Los Angeles, California	Electric Pony Studios	Jeff Cobb vs. Chris Dickinson
Josh Barnett's Bloodsport 5	February 20, 2021	Los Angeles, California	Electric Pony Studios	Jon Moxley vs. Davey Boy Smith Jr.
Josh Barnett's Bloodsport 6	April 8, 2021	Tampa, Florida	Cuban Club	Josh Barnett vs. Jon Moxley
Josh Barnett's Bloodsport 7	October 22, 2021	Los Angeles, California	Ukrainian Cultural Center	Chris Dickinson vs. Minoru Suzuki
Josh Barnett's Bloodsport 8	March 31, 2022	Dallas, Texas	Fair Park	Chris Dickinson vs. Minoru Suzuki
Josh Barnett's Bloodsport 9	March 30, 2023	Los Angeles, California	Ukrainian Culture Center	Timothy Thatcher vs. Josh Barnett
Josh Barnett's Bloodsport X	April 4, 2024	Philadelphia, Pennsylvania	Penn's Landing Caterers	Josh Barnett vs. Johnny Bloodsport
Josh Barnett's Bloodsport: Bushido	June 22, 2024	Sumida, Tokyo, Japan	Ryōgoku Kokugikan	Jon Moxley vs. Josh Barnett
Josh Barnett's Bloodsport XI	July 28, 2024	New York City, New York	Roulette Intermedium	Shayna Baszler vs. Miyu Yamashita
Josh Barnett's Bloodsport XII	November 24, 2024	Jersey City, New Jersey	White Eagle Hall	Josh Barnett vs. MVP
Josh Barnett's Bloodsport XIII	April 17, 2025	Las Vegas, Nevada	Pearl Concert Theater	Josh Barnett vs. Gabe Kidd
Josh Barnett's Bloodsport XIV	August 2, 2025	Rutherford, New Jersey	The Williams Center	Nattie Neidhart vs. Masha Slamovich
Josh Barnett's Bloodsport: London	September 28, 2025	London, England	Electric Ballroom	Josh Barnett vs. Oli Thompson
Josh Barnett's Bloodsport XV	April 17, 2026	Paradise, Nevada	Horseshoe Las Vegas	Josh Barnett vs. Yuji Nagata

== Events ==
=== Josh Barnett's Bloodsport 3 ===
Promotional poster featuring Jon Moxley and Chris Dickinson

Josh Barnett's Bloodsport 3 took place on October 11, 2020, at the Marion County Fairgrounds Coliseum in Indianapolis, Indiana. The event was held as part of the Collective 2020 weekend. It was originally scheduled to be held on April 2, 2020, at The Cuban Club in Tampa, Florida, but was postponed due to the COVID-19 pandemic in Florida.

The event included an inaugural Bloodsport Women's Tournament, which was the first professional wrestling tournament to ever be held at a Bloodsport event. The trophy was awarded to Lindsay Snow.

No.	Results	Stipulations	Times
1	Simon Grimm defeated Matt Makowski by referee stoppage	Singles match	8:31
2	Allysin Kay defeated Killer Kelly by submission	Women's tournament semifinal match	12:19
3	Lindsay Snow defeated Leyla Hirsch by submission	Women's tournament semifinal match	4:28
4	Calvin Tankman defeated Alexander James by knockout	Singles match	6:40
5	Erik Hammer defeated Kal Jack by submission	Singles match	7:36
6	Tom Lawlor defeated Homicide by submission	Singles match	8:46
7	Davey Boy Smith Jr. defeated Josh Alexander by knockout	Singles match	5:01
8	Lindsay Snow defeated Allysin Kay by submission	Women's tournament final match	5:26
9	Jon Moxley defeated Chris Dickinson by technical submission	Singles match	14:42

Bloodsport Women's Tournament

Semifinals
Allysin Kay	Sub
Killer Kelly	12:19
Lindsay Snow	Sub
Leyla Hirsch	4:28

Final
Allysin Kay	Sub
Lindsay Snow	5:26

=== Josh Barnett's Bloodsport 4 ===
Josh Barnett's Bloodsport 4 took place on February 13, 2021, at Electric Pony Studios in Los Angeles, California.

No.	Results	Stipulations	Times
1	Diego Perez defeated Gil Guardado by submission	Singles match	4:14
2	Calder McColl defeated Royce Isaacs by submission	Singles match	8:11
3	Super Beast defeated Bad Dude Tito by submission	Singles match	5:35
4	J. R. Kratos defeated Alex Coughlin by TKO	Singles match	7:19
5	Kal Jak defeated Nolan Edward by knockout	Singles match	3:40
6	Tom Lawlor defeated Simon Grimm by TKO	Singles match	7:18
7	Davey Boy Smith Jr. defeated Calvin Tankman by submission	Singles match	4:30
8	Jeff Cobb defeated Chris Dickinson by knockout	Singles match	11:08

=== Josh Barnett's Bloodsport 5 ===
Josh Barnett's Bloodsport 5 took place on February 20, 2021, at Electric Pony Studios in Los Angeles, California, only a week removed from Bloodsport 4.

No.	Results	Stipulations	Times
1	Calder McColl defeated Bad Dude Tito by submission	Singles match	7:45
2	Calvin Tankman defeated Nolan Edward by TKO	Singles match	3:16
3	Kal Jack defeated Superbeast by submission	Singles match	3:56
4	Royce Isaacs defeated Alex Coughlin by submission	Singles match	5:38
5	Rocky Romero defeated Simon Grimm by submission	Singles match	10:24
6	Chris Dickinson defeated J. R. Kratos by submission	Singles match	6:47
7	Jeff Cobb defeated Tom Lawlor by submission	Singles match	7:33
8	Jon Moxley defeated Davey Boy Smith Jr. by TKO	Singles match	11:51

=== Josh Barnett's Bloodsport 6 ===
Josh Barnett's Bloodsport 6 took place on April 8, 2021, at The Cuban Club in Tampa, Florida.

No.	Results	Stipulations	Times
1	Karen Tran defeated Janai Kai by submission	Singles match	9:11
2	Matt Makowski defeated Heddi Karaoui by submission	Singles match	6:46
3	Bad Dude Tito defeated Victor Benjamin by submission	Singles match	5:08
4	Simon Grimm defeated Alexander James by submission	Singles match	6:23
5	Alex Coughlin defeated Royce Isaacs by submission	Singles match	5:07
6	Super Beast defeated Shlak by way of disqualification	Singles match	2:18
7	Allysin Kay defeated Masha Slamovich by TKO	Singles match	5:45
8	Lio Rush defeated Yoya by submission	Singles match	7:40
9	Davey Boy Smith Jr. defeated KTB by knockout	Singles match	3:36
10	Chavo Guerrero Jr. defeated Rocky Romero by TKO	Singles match	6:18
11	Chris Dickinson defeated Shane Mercer by submission	Singles match	5:33
12	Josh Barnett defeated Jon Moxley by TKO	Singles match	11:07

=== Josh Barnett's Bloodsport 7 ===
Josh Barnett's Bloodsport 7 took place on October 22, 2021, at the Ukrainian Culture Center in Los Angeles, California.

No.	Results	Stipulations	Times
1	Yoya defeated Starboy Charlie via KO	Singles match	3:42
2	Zeda Zhang defeated KZT by submission	Singles match	7:09
3	Clark Connors defeated Royce Isaacs by submission	Singles match	5:34
4	Erik Hammer defeated Bad Dude Tito by submission	Singles match	4:35
5	Marina Shafir defeated Masha Slamovich by submission	Singles match	4:53
6	J. R. Kratos defeated Calvin Tankman by TKO	Singles match	6:55
7	Tom Lawlor defeated Alex Coughlin by submission	Singles match	8:10
8	Davey Richards defeated Yuya Uemura by submission	Singles match	7:17
9	Josh Barnett defeated Tiger Ruas by submission	Singles match	9:00

=== Josh Barnett's Bloodsport 8 ===
Josh Barnett's Bloodsport 8 took place on March 31, 2022, at Fair Park in Dallas, Texas.

No.	Results	Stipulations	Times
1	Masha Slamovich defeated Janai Kai by submission	Singles match	4:43
2	Ninja Mack defeated Yoya by TKO	Singles match	6:06
3	Royce Isaacs defeated Bad Dude Tito by submission	Singles match	5:37
4	Alex Coughlin defeated Slade by TKO	Singles match	3:34
5	John Hennigan defeated Simon Gotch by TKO	Singles match	5:59
6	Marina Shafir defeated Zeda Zhang by submission	Singles match	7:54
7	J. R. Kratos defeated Timothy Thatcher by knockout	Singles match	9:26
8	Yuya Uemura defeated "Speedball" Mike Bailey by submission	Singles match	7:04
9	Josh Barnett defeated Jonah by submission	Singles match	8:46
10	Jon Moxley defeated Biff Busick by TKO	Singles match	10:25
11	Chris Dickinson defeated Minoru Suzuki by TKO	Singles match	9:45

=== Josh Barnett's Bloodsport 9 ===
Promotional poster for the event

Josh Barnett's Bloodsport 9 took place on March 30, 2023, at the Ukrainian Culture Center in Los Angeles, California.

No.	Results	Stipulations	Times
1	Jeff Cobb defeated Calder McColl by technical knockout	Singles match	6:02
2	Erik Hammer defeated Calvin Tankman by submission	Singles match	2:52
3	Marina Shafir defeated Killer Kelly by submission	Singles match	5:39
4	Kota Ibushi defeated "Speedball" Mike Bailey by knockout	Singles match	6:52
5	Bad Dude Tito defeated Yuya Uemura by submission	Singles match	5:07
6	Harry Smith defeated J. R. Kratos by submission	Singles match	10:42
7	Johnny Bloodsport defeated Royce Isaacs by submission	Singles match	7:51
8	Jon Moxley defeated Alex Coughlin by submission	Singles match	6:30
9	Timothy Thatcher defeated Josh Barnett by submission	Singles match	12:07

=== Josh Barnett's Bloodsport XI ===
Josh Barnett's Bloodsport XI took place on July 28, 2024, at the Roulette Intermedium in New York City, New York.

No.	Results	Stipulations	Times
1	Heddi Karaoui defeated Brian Johnson by submission	Singles match	3:23
2	Julius Creed defeated Matt Makowski by technical knockout	Singles match	4:58
3	Masha Slamovich defeated Jody Threat by technical knockout	Singles match	5:23
4	Royce Isaacs defeated Charlie Dempsey by submission	Singles match	9:34
5	"Speedball" Mike Bailey defeated Akira by technical knockout	Singles match	2:55
6	Brutus Creed defeated Tom Lawlor by technical knockout	Singles match	6:37
7	Homicide defeated Mike Santana by Technical knockout	Singles match	9:00
8	Josh Barnett defeated Bad Dude Tito by technical knockout	Singles match	7:42
9	Timothy Thatcher vs. Josh Woods ended in a draw	Singles match	9:39
10	Shayna Baszler defeated Miyu Yamashita by technical knockout	Singles match	8:38

=== Josh Barnett's Bloodsport XII ===
Josh Barnett's Bloodsport XII took place on November 24, 2024, at the White Eagle Hall in Jersey City, New Jersey.

No.	Results	Stipulations	Times
1	Lou Nixon defeated Calvin Tankman by technical knockout	Singles match	2:12
2	Davit Modzmanashvili defeated Matt Makowski by technical knockout	Singles match	6:19
3	Karmen Petrovic defeated Sumie Sakai by Technical knockout	Singles match	4:39
4	Dominic Garrini defeated Kevin Ku by submission	Singles match	3:37
5	Charlie Dempsey (with Myles Borne) defeated Tracy Williams by submission	Singles match	9:27
6	Marina Shafir (with Jon Moxley) defeated Jody Threat by submission	Singles match	7:22
7	Masha Slamovich (c) defeated Léi Ying Lee by Technical knockout	Singles match for the TNA Knockouts World Championship	6:38
8	Royce Isaacs defeated Myles Borne (with Charlie Dempsey) by submission	Singles match	8:29
9	Josh Alexander defeated Mike Bailey by submission	Singles match	10:10
10	Josh Barnett defeated MVP by submission	Singles match	13:29
(c) / – the champion(s) heading into the match

=== Josh Barnett's Bloodsport XIII ===
Josh Barnett's Bloodsport XIII took place on April 17, 2025, at the Pearl Concert Theater in Paradise, Nevada.

No.	Results	Stipulations	Times
1	Leyla Hirsch defeated Jordan Blade by technical knockout	Singles match	3:32
2	Maika (with Hanako) defeated Karmen Petrovic by submission	Singles match	4:26
3	Charlie Dempsey (with Tavion Heights) defeated Shinya Aoki by technical knockout	Singles match	9:18
4	Karrion Kross defeated J. R. Kratos by submission	Singles match	7:40
5	Pete Dunne defeated Timothy Thatcher by submission	Singles match	11:15
6	Nattie Neidhart defeated Miyu Yamashita by Technical knockout	Singles match	7:14
7	Tavion Heights (with Charlie Dempsey) defeated Royce Isaacs by technical knockout	Singles match	8:41
8	Shayna Baszler (with Michin) defeated Konami (with Natsuko Tora) by technical knockout	Singles match	5:59
9	Zack Sabre Jr. defeated Jonathan Gresham by technical knockout	Singles match	17:35
10	Gabe Kidd defeated Josh Barnett by technical knockout	Singles match	9:32
