= Josh Barnett's Bloodsport XV =

2026 Game Changer Wrestling pay-per-view event

- Promotional poster
- Promotion: Game Changer Wrestling
- Date: April 17, 2026
- City: Paradise, Nevada
- Venue: Horseshoe Las Vegas

Game Changer Wrestling event chronology
← Previous; Gringo Loco's The Wrld on Lucha	Next → Joey Janela's Spring Break X

Bloodsport chronology
← Previous; London	Next → Last

Josh Barnett's Bloodsport XV was a professional wrestling pay-per-view event produced by Game Changer Wrestling (GCW). It was held on April 17, 2026, at Horseshoe Las Vegas in Paradise, Nevada and was streamed live on Triller TV. This was also the final Bloodsport event that took place for the foreseeable future. The show also featured wrestlers from WWE, Pro Wrestling NOAH, and New Japan Pro-Wrestling (NJPW).

== Production ==
=== Background ===
Bloodsport is an annual professional wrestling event which features worked shoot matches in a style that mimics the early days of MMA and catch wrestling. It is common for Bloodsport competitors to have some experience in other combat sports and/or mixed martial arts, as well as professional wrestling, as these one on one matches often appear stiff and have a feel of a classic Shoot-style wrestling fights. The ropes and turnbuckles for the ring are often removed and replaced by a ring canvas with no ropes or turnbuckles. The first Bloodsport, titled Matt Riddle's Bloodsport, took place on April 5, 2019 in Kenner, Louisiana with Matt Riddle vs. Minoru Suzuki being the main event match. On August 18, 2018, Matt Riddle made his WWE debut and the promotion announced that they had signed him as a member of the NXT roster. Beginning in 2019, mixed martial arts fighter and professional wrestler Josh Barnett had taken over booking duties for the event which was renamed to Josh Barnett's Bloodsport. The first Bloodsport event to be booked By Josh Barnett took place on April 4, 2019 at in Jersey City, New Jersey in conjunction with the inaugural Collective.

On January 4, 2026, GCW announced that Bloodsport XV would be part of a combined Collective and WrestleCon event and that it would be set to take place on April 17, 2026. On March 4, 2026, Barnett announced that Pete Dunne would be competing during the event. On March 23, 2026, Josh Barnett announced that WWE wrestlers Timothy Thatcher and Charlie Dempsey would be fighting against each other during the event. On March 27, 2026, GCW announced that WWE wrestler Nattie Neidhart would be fighting against Shayna Baszler. On March 30, 2026, it was announced that Josh Barnett would be fighting against New Japan Pro-Wrestling wrestler Yuji Nagata who would be making his Bloodsport debut.

=== Aftermath ===
After the show had concluded, Josh Barnett announced that he was putting the Bloodsport event series on hiatus for the foreseeable future. On April 20, 2026, during an interview with Ariel Helwani, Barnett explained that Bloodsport had ended due to financial issues though he later explained that he was attempting to get corporate sponsors involved with the events.

== Results ==
No.	Results	Stipulations	Times
1	Matt Mako defeated Angel Verduczo by technical knockout	Singles match	5:41
2	Ulka Sasaki defeated Joe Dashou by knockout	Singles match	5:16
3	Zack Sabre Jr. defeated Ray Jaz by submission	Singles match	6:09
4	Miyu Yamashita defeated Janai Kai by knockout	Singles match	5:29
5	Royce Isaacs defeated Shane Mercer by submission	Singles match	9:06
6	Pete Dunne defeated Masashi Takeda by submission	Singles match	8:30
7	Fuminori Abe defeated Erick Stevens by technical knockout	Singles match	6:37
8	Charlie Dempsey defeated Timothy Thatcher by submission	Singles match	10:40
9	Nattie Neidhart defeated Shayna Baszler by countout	Singles match	8:05
10	Josh Barnett defeated Yuji Nagata by technical knockout	Singles match	13:38
