= Josh Barnett's Bloodsport 2 =

2019 Game Changer Wrestling pay-per-view event

- Promotional poster featuring Nick Gage and Killer Kross
- Promotion: Game Changer Wrestling
- Date: September 14, 2019
- City: Atlantic City, New Jersey
- Venue: Showboat Resort Atlantic City

Game Changer Wrestling event chronology
← Previous; 2 Cups Stuffed	Next → Code of the Streets

Bloodsport event chronology
← Previous; 1	Next → 3

Josh Barnett's Bloodsport 2 was a professional wrestling pay-per-view event produced by Game Changer Wrestling (GCW). The show took place on September 14, 2019 at Showboat Resort Atlantic City in Atlantic City, New Jersey and was streamed live on FITE TV.

== Production ==
=== Background ===
Bloodsport is an annual professional wrestling event which features worked shoot matches in a style that mimics the early days of MMA and catch wrestling. It is common for Bloodsport competitors to have some experience in other combat sports and/or mixed martial arts, as well as professional wrestling, as these one on one matches often appear stiff and have a feel of a classic Shoot-style wrestling fights. The ropes and turnbuckles for the ring are often removed and replaced by a ring canvas with no ropes or turnbuckles. The first Bloodsport, titled Matt Riddle's Bloodsport, took place on April 5, 2019 in Kenner, Louisiana with Matt Riddle vs. Minoru Suzuki being the main event match. On August 18, 2018, Matt Riddle made his WWE debut and the promotion announced that they had signed him as a member of the NXT roster. Beginning in 2019, mixed martial arts fighter and professional wrestler Josh Barnett had taken over booking duties for the event which was renamed to Josh Barnett's Bloodsport. The first Bloodsport event to be booked By Josh Barnett took place on April 4, 2019 at in Jersey City, New Jersey in conjunction with the inaugural Collective. On July 22, 2019, GCW announced that Josh Barnett would be facing Jon Moxley in the main event. On August 14, 2019, it was announced that Ikuhisa Minowa would be competing during the event. On August 16, 2019, Barnett announced that Santino Marella would be part of the event. On August 23, 2019, Barnett announced that Moxley had been pulled from the show due to an MRSA infection in his elbow. On September 8, 2019, GCW announced that Chris Dickinson had replaced Moxley as Barnett's opponent.

=== Storylines ===
Josh Barnett's Bloodsport 2 featured professional wrestling matches that involves different wrestlers from pre-existing scripted feuds and storylines. Wrestlers portrayed villains, heroes, or less distinguishable characters in scripted events that built tension and culminated in a wrestling match or series of matches. Storylines were produced on Game Changer Wrestling's various pay-per-view events.

== Results ==
No.	Results	Stipulations	Times
1	Matt Makowski defeated Rory Gulak by knockout	Singles match	5:41
2	Sumie Sakai defeated Lindsay Snow by submission	Singles match	4:40
3	Anthony Henry defeated Zachary Wentz by submission	Singles match	4:20
4	Erik Hammer defeated J. R. Kratos by submission	Singles match	10:26
5	Allysin Kay defeated Nicole Savoy by knockout	Singles match	10:48
6	Anthony Carelli defeated Simon Grimm by submission	Singles match	10:40
7	Timothy Thatcher defeated Ikuhisa Minowa by submission	Singles match	9:34
8	Davey Boy Smith Jr. defeated Tom Lawlor by knockout	Singles match	11:59
9	Killer Kross defeated Nick Gage by submission	Singles match	3:27
10	Josh Barnett defeated Chris Dickinson by knockout	Singles match	16:55
