= Josh Barnett's Bloodsport: London =

2025 Game Changer Wrestling pay-per-view event

- Promotional poster
- Promotion: Game Changer Wrestling
- Date: September 28, 2025 (aired October 2, 2025)
- City: London, England
- Venue: Electric Ballroom

Game Changer Wrestling event chronology
← Previous; Knockout	Next → The Last Frontier

Bloodsport chronology
← Previous; XIV	Next → XV

Josh Barnett's Bloodsport: London was a professional wrestling pay-per-view event produced by Game Changer Wrestling (GCW). It was held on September 28, 2025 at the Electric Ballroom in London, England and was aired on tape delay on Triller TV on October 2, 2025. It was the second Bloodsport event to take place outside the United States. The show also featured wrestlers from Progress Wrestling and All Elite Wrestling (AEW).

== Production ==
=== Background ===
Bloodsport is an annual professional wrestling event which features worked shoot matches in a style that mimics the early days of MMA and catch wrestling. It is common for Bloodsport competitors to have some experience in other combat sports and/or mixed martial arts, as well as professional wrestling, as these one on one matches often appear stiff and have a feel of a classic Shoot-style wrestling fights. The ropes and turnbuckles for the ring are often removed and replaced by a ring canvas with no ropes or turnbuckles. The first Bloodsport, titled Matt Riddle's Bloodsport, took place on April 5, 2019 in Kenner, Louisiana with Matt Riddle vs. Minoru Suzuki being the main event match. On August 18, 2018, Matt Riddle made his WWE debut and the promotion announced that they had signed him as a member of the NXT roster. Beginning in 2019, mixed martial arts fighter and professional wrestler Josh Barnett had taken over booking duties for the event which was renamed to Josh Barnett's Bloodsport. The first Bloodsport event to be booked By Josh Barnett took place on April 4, 2019 at in Jersey City, New Jersey in conjunction with the inaugural Collective. On June 22, 2024, the first Bloodsport event to take place outside the United States was held at the Ryogoku Kokugikan in Tokyo, Japan.

On January 26, 2025, GCW announced that Bloodsport would be held in England for the first time on September 28, 2025 at the Electric Ballroom in London. On September 22, 2025, GCW announced that Josh Barnett would be fighting against Oli Thompson. On September 24, 2025, Barnett announced that All Elite Wrestling (AEW) wrestler Anthony Ogogo would be fighting against Brett Semtex during the event.

=== Storylines ===
Josh Barnett's Bloodsport: London featured professional wrestling matches that involves different wrestlers from pre-existing scripted feuds and storylines. Wrestlers portrayed villains, heroes, or less distinguishable characters in scripted events that built tension and culminated in a wrestling match or series of matches. Storylines were produced on Game Changer Wrestling's various pay-per-view events.

== Results ==
No.	Results	Stipulations	Times
1	Kev Lloyd defeated Heddi Karaoui by submission	Singles match	5:13
2	Lou Nixon defeated Chris Bungard by submission	Singles match	3:17
3	John Hathaway defeated Taylor McCann by submission	Catch wrestling match	5:12
4	RPD defeated James Pharrell by submission	Singles match	5:36
5	Chris Ridgeway defeated Mark Trew by submission	Singles match	5:51
6	Anthony Ogogo defeated Brett Semtex by knockout	Singles match	5:00
7	Josh Barnett defeated Oli Thompson by submission	Singles match	10:54
