= Josh Barnett's Bloodsport: Bushido =

2024 professional wrestling pay-per-view event

Josh Barnett's Bloodsport: Bushido ブラッドスポーツ 武士道 (Japanese)
- Promotional poster
- Date: June 22, 2024
- City: Tokyo, Japan
- Venue: Ryogoku Kokugikan

Bloodsport chronology
← Previous; X	Next → XI

Josh Barnett's Bloodsport: Bushido (ブラッドスポーツ・ブシドー (Buraddosupōto bushidō)) was an independent professional wrestling pay-per-view event promoted by Josh Barnett and produced by Abema, a Japanese streaming service owned by CyberAgent and TV Asahi. The event took place on June 22, 2024 at the Ryogoku Kokugikan in Tokyo, Japan and was streamed live on Triller TV worldwide and on Abema in Japan.

== Production ==
=== Background ===
Other on-screen personnel
Role:	Name:
Commentators	Stewart Fulton (English)
Commentators	Mark Pickering (English)
Commentators	Shigeki Seino (Japanese)
Commentators	Yuki Nakai (Japanese)
Commentators	Kota Ibushi (Japanese)
Ring announcer	Lenne Hardt

Bloodsport is an annual professional wrestling event which features worked shoot matches in a style that mimics the early days of MMA and catch wrestling. It is common for Bloodsport competitors to have some experience in other combat sports and/or mixed martial arts, as well as professional wrestling, as these one on one matches often appear stiff and have a feel of a classic Shoot-style wrestling fights. The ropes and turnbuckles for the ring are often removed and replaced by a ring canvas with no ropes or turnbuckles. The first event took place on April 5, 2018 as Matt Riddle's Bloodsport and featured Matt Riddle vs. Minoru Suzuki as the main event match. On February 14, 2024, Josh Barnett and Minoru Suzuki announced the first Bloodsport event to take place in Japan titled Bloodsport Bushido which would take place at the Ryogoku Kokugikan in Tokyo.

On March 28, 2024, it was announced that Rampage Jackson, Kazushi Sakuraba, Davit Mojimanashaviri, Funaki, Mike O’Hearn, and Davey Boy Smith Jr. were scheduled to compete in the event. On April 18, 2024, it was announced that Jon Moxley would be having a rematch against Josh Barnett in the main event of the show.

== Results ==
No.	Results	Stipulations	Times
1	Fuminori Abe defeated Yu Iizuka by submission	Singles match	4:14
2	Hideki Suzuki defeated Hikaru Sato by submission	Bushido Tournament semifinals match	5:13
3	Erik Hammer defeated Takuya Nomura by technical knockout	Bushido Tournament semifinals match	3:06
4	Konami defeated Maya Fukuda by submission	Singles match	5:52
5	Masakatsu Funaki defeated Davey Boy Smith Jr. by submission	Singles match	7:29
6	Quinton Jackson defeated Hideki Sekine by knockout	Singles match	4:31
7	Kazushi Sakuraba defeated Santino Marella by submission	Singles match	10:53
8	Minoru Suzuki defeated Timothy Thatcher by technical knockout	Singles match	11:19
9	Hideki Suzuki defeated Erik Hammer by submission	Bushido Tournament final match	8:14
10	Josh Barnett vs. Jon Moxley ended in a time-limit draw	Singles match	20:00
11	Jon Moxley defeated Josh Barnett by knockout	Singles match	2:26

Bloodsport Bushido Tournament

Semifinals
Hikaru Sato	Sub
Hideki Suzuki	5:13
Erik Hammer	KO
Takuya Nomura	3:06

Final
Hideki Suzuki	Sub
Erik Hammer	8:14
