= Josh Barnett's Bloodsport (2019) =

2019 Game Changer Wrestling pay-per-view event

- Promotional poster featuring Tom Lawlor, Timothy Thatcher, Frank Mir, Hideki Suzuki, and Josh Barnett
- Promotion: Game Changer Wrestling
- Date: April 4, 2019
- City: Jersey City, New Jersey
- Venue: White Eagle Hall

Game Changer Wrestling event chronology
← Previous; Code of the Streets	Next → Joey Janela's Spring Break 3 Part 1

Bloodsport event chronology
← Previous; Matt Riddle	Next → 2

Josh Barnett's Bloodsport was a professional wrestling pay-per-view event produced by Game Changer Wrestling (GCW). It was held on April 4, 2019 at White Eagle Hall in Jersey City, New Jersey and was streamed live on FITE TV in conjunction with the inaugural Collective during WrestleMania 35 weekend.

== Production ==
=== Background ===
Bloodsport is an annual professional wrestling event which features worked shoot matches in a style that mimics the early days of MMA and catch wrestling. It is common for Bloodsport competitors to have some experience in other combat sports and/or mixed martial arts, as well as professional wrestling, as these one on one matches often appear stiff and have a feel of a classic Shoot-style wrestling fights. The ropes and turnbuckles for the ring are often removed and replaced by a ring canvas with no ropes or turnbuckles. The first Bloodsport, titled Matt Riddle's Bloodsport, took place on April 5, 2019 in Kenner, Louisiana with Matt Riddle vs. Minoru Suzuki being the main event match. On August 18, 2018, Matt Riddle made his WWE debut and the promotion announced that they had signed him as a member of the NXT roster. Beginning in 2019, mixed martial arts fighter and professional wrestler Josh Barnett had taken over booking duties for the event which was renamed to Josh Barnett's Bloodsport. On October 11, 2018, Barnett announced that the first Bloodsport event to booked by him would take place on April 4, 2019 at in Jersey City, New Jersey. On December 4, 2018, GCW announced that Timothy Thatcher would compete during the event. on January 11, 2019, Barnett announced that former UFC Heavyweight Champion Frank Mir would make his professional wrestling debut at Bloodsport. On January 18, 2019, Barnett announced that former NWA World Heavyweight Champion and UFC Hall of Famer Dan Severn would be competing. On January 31, 2019, Masashi Takeda was added to the event.

=== Storylines ===
Josh Barnett's Bloodsport featured professional wrestling matches that involves different wrestlers from pre-existing scripted feuds and storylines. Wrestlers portrayed villains, heroes, or less distinguishable characters in scripted events that built tension and culminated in a wrestling match or series of matches. Storylines were produced on Game Changer Wrestling's various pay-per-view events.

== Results ==
No.	Results	Stipulations	Times
1	Dominic Garrini defeated Phil Baroni by disqualification	Singles match	4:12
2	J. R. Kratos defeated Simon Grimm by knockout	Singles match	9:10
3	Davey Boy Smith Jr. defeated Killer Kross by submission	Singles match	12:34
4	Masashi Takeda defeated Jonathan Gresham by knockout	Singles match	7:01
5	Chris Dickinson defeated Andy Williams (with Pepper Parks) by submission	Singles match	3:45
6	Frank Mir defeated Dan Severn by submission	Singles match	3:43
7	Hideki Suzuki defeated Timothy Thatcher by knockout	Singles match	12:00
8	Josh Barnett vs. Minoru Suzuki ended in a time limit draw	Singles match	25:00
