= Jack Sandlin Memorial Coliseum =

Convention center in Indianapolis, Indiana

- Interactive map of Jack Sandlin Memorial Coliseum
- Address: 7300 East Troy Avenue
- Location: Indianapolis, Indiana
- Coordinates: 39.7290395°N 86.0368484°W
- Owner: Marion County Agricultural Fair Association, Inc.
- Capacity: 2,000

Construction
- Opened: 1953

The Jack Sandlin Memorial Coliseum, formerly the Marion County Fairgrounds Coliseum and also referred to by its full name, the Senator Jack E. Sandlin Memorial Coliseum, is a 2,000-seat arena located in Indianapolis, Indiana. The arena has hosted various events from Marion County Fair since 1953 while also hosting stand-alone events.

== History ==
The coliseum originally opened in 1953 when the Marion County Fair was moved to its current site at the intersection of Fisher Road and East Troy Avenue.

On June 28, 2024, the arena was renamed to the Jack E. Sandlin Memorial Coliseum in honor of former Indiana State Senator Jack Sandlin who had died in 2023.
