= Deference =

Aspect of human behavior

Deference (also called submission or passivity) is the condition of submitting to the espoused, legitimate influence of one's superior or superiors. Deference implies a yielding or submitting to the judgment of a recognized superior, out of respect or reverence. Deference has been studied extensively by political scientists, sociologists, and psychologists.

== Politics ==
Smolenski (2005) examines deference in colonial Pennsylvania, to see how claims to political authority were made, justified, and accepted or rejected. He focuses on the "colonial speech economy," that is, the implicit rules that determined who was allowed to address whom and under what conditions, and describes how the qualities that inspired deference changed in the province from 1691 to 1764. The Quaker elite initially established a monopoly on political leadership based on what they believed to be their inherent civic virtue grounded in their religious and social class. By 1760, this view had been discredited and replaced with the consensus that civic virtue was an achieved, not an inherent, attribute and that it should be demonstrated by the display of appropriate manliness and the valor of men who were willing to take up arms for the common defense of the colony. Further, Pennsylvanians came to believe that all white men, not just wealthy property owners, were equally capable of achieving political voice. Martial masculinity, therefore, became the defining characteristic of the ideal citizen and marked a significant transformation in the way individuals justified their right to represent the public interest.

== Sociology ==
Erving Goffman, a Canadian-born sociologist and writer, explored the relationship between deference and demeanor in his 1967 essay "The Nature of Deference and Demeanor". According to Goffman, a person with a poor demeanor will be held in lower esteem by society. The opposite is true for a person with a good demeanor: society will hold them in a higher esteem. An example of this situation can be seen through the way a person acts in a social setting. e.g. a man pulling out a chair for a woman at a restaurant. On the other end of the spectrum, a person not bathing before they go to a fancy dinner party. These examples can be defined as presentational deference. Demeanor does not only limit itself to the actions of an individual, but also the appearance of an individual. A person offers themselves to a social group through a good appearance or a well demeanored appearance. When an individual has a well demeanored appearance it makes interaction between people easier. After a person is socially accepted to a group, it is expected that they will conform to interactional norms. Through acting on those norms, people receive deference.

== Psychology ==
There is ongoing debate among psychologists as to the extent to which deference in a relationship is determined by a person's innate personality type or is the result of a person's experiences and conditioning. In interpersonal relationships, a partner can assume a submissive role to fit in or to make themself acceptable to the other partner, which can be a benign aspect of a relationship. On the other hand, it may be an indication of an interpersonal problem, such as partner abuse. If one or both of the people are experiencing chronic, pervasive emotional distress then the sex partners or individuals may require psychological evaluation.

In interpersonal relationships, some people prefer or are willing to adopt a submissive role in sexual activities or personal matters. The level and type of submission can vary from person to person, and from one context to another; and also is dependent on the other partner being willing to assume control in those situations. Some people can include occasional acts of submission in an otherwise conventional sex life, or adopt a submissive lifestyle.

== Biology ==
Submission is also a common behavior in the animal kingdom, with a prevalence that spans the whole vertebrate-invertebrate gamut. Signs of submission are used either to preempt dangerous combat (in which case they usually appear at the beginning of an encounter) or to establish a dominance hierarchy (in which case they usually appear after the encounter). Often the behaviors used to appease the opponent or yield to his authority are of a stereotyped nature (e.g., bowing of the head, crouching, prostration, placing the tail between the legs, lying on ones back, grooming) but can sometimes develop into elaborate ritualistic performances (e.g., food supplication by the submissive animal, regurgitation of food by the dominant and ingestion of the regurgitated food by the submissive). It is believed by some researchers that part of the instinctive machinery subserving these behaviors is related to that used to evade or withstand predator attacks where similar behaviors appear (e.g., crouching, prostration, lying on the back). Other researchers have speculated what functions, if any, these behaviors may play in modern humans and come up with several possibilities (mostly from an evolutionary perspective); that they help in the establishment of parent-child attachment and pair bond formation, that they promote the development of theory of mind, that they play a role in the emergence of language, and that they may lay behind the higher cooperative and communicative abilities of humans.

== See also ==
- Acquiescence
- Authority bias
- Codependency
- Compliance (psychology)
- Dominance (ethology)
- Dominance and submission
- Kyriarchy
- Obedience (human behavior)
- Passive–aggressive behavior
- Role suction
- Social integration
- Status attainment
- Sycophancy
