= Matt Riddle's Bloodsport =

2018 Game Changer Wrestling pay-per-view event

- Promotional poster
- Promotion: Game Changer Wrestling
- Date: April 5, 2018
- City: Kenner, Louisiana
- Venue: Pontchartrain Convention & Civic Center

Game Changer Wrestling event chronology
← Previous; Red Means Green	Next → Joey Janela's Spring Break 2

Bloodsport event chronology
← Previous; First	Next → Josh Barnett's

Matt Riddle's Bloodsport was a professional wrestling pay-per-view event produced by Game Changer Wrestling (GCW). It was held on April 5, 2018 at the Pontchartrain Convention & Civic Center in Kenner, Louisiana and was streamed live on WWNLive during WrestleMania 34 weekend. It was also the first Bloodsport event to take place.

== Production ==
=== Background ===
Bloodsport is an annual professional wrestling event which features worked shoot matches in a style that mimics the early days of MMA and catch wrestling. It is common for Bloodsport competitors to have some experience in other combat sports and/or mixed martial arts, as well as professional wrestling, as these one on one matches often appear stiff and have a feel of a classic Shoot-style wrestling fights. The ropes and turnbuckles for the ring are often removed and replaced by a ring canvas with no ropes or turnbuckles.

On February 10, 2018, GCW announced the first match which was Matt Riddle vs. Low Ki. In the build up to the event, more matches were announced including Dan Severn vs. Chris Dickinson and Martin Stone vs. Masada. On April 4, 2018, GCW announced that Low Ki had been replaced by Minoru Suzuki in the main event match.

== Storylines ==
Matt Riddle's Bloodsport featured professional wrestling matches that involves different wrestlers from pre-existing scripted feuds and storylines. Wrestlers portrayed villains, heroes, or less distinguishable characters in scripted events that built tension and culminated in a wrestling match or series of matches. Storylines were produced on Game Changer Wrestling's various pay-per-view events.

== Aftermath ==
On August 18, 2018, Matt Riddle made his WWE debut and the promotion announced that they had signed him as a member of the NXT roster. Future Bloodsport events were rebranded to Josh Barnett's Bloodsport beginning in 2019 with the first event booked by Barnett announced on October 11, 2018. During several interviews with the Pro Wrestling 4 Life and the Ringsiders Wrestling podcasts, Barnett had criticized the event, claiming that the bookers had "no idea what they were doing".

== Results ==
No.	Results	Stipulations	Times
1	Dominic Garrini (with Tom Lawlor) defeated KTB by submission	Singles match	3:31
2	Eddie Kingston (with Matt Riddle) defeated Tracy Williams (with Wheeler Yuta) by knockout	Singles match	6:02
3	Masada defeated Martin Stone by technical knockout	Singles match	4:59
4	Walter defeated Tom Lawlor by submission	Singles match	7:53
5	Dan Severn defeated Chris Dickinson by submission	Singles match	8:48
6	Nick Gage defeated Timothy Thatcher by technical knockout	Singles match	7:44
7	Minoru Suzuki defeated Matt Riddle (with Eddie Kingston) by submission	Singles match	8:11
