= Chuck Coates =

American professional wrestler (1962-2025)

Personal information
- Born: Charles Edward Coates; August 13, 1967 Durham, North Carolina, United States
- Died: September 8, 2025 (aged 58)

Professional wrestling career
- Ring name(s): Chuck Coates; Madd Maxx; Agent Maxx; Black Scorpion; Santa Claus; German Stormtropper #2; Russian Assassin; Hans Hessler
- Billed height: 6 ft 1 in (185 cm)
- Billed weight: 271 lb (123 kg)
- Billed from: Germany (German Stromtroopers); Russia (Russian Assassin)
- Trained by: Nelson Royal
- Debut: 1986
- Retired: 2002; March 22, 2025 (last match)

Charles Edward Coates (August 13, 1967 - September 8, 2025) was an American professional wrestler, better known by his ring name Chuck Coates, who competed in Mid-Atlantic and Southern independent promotions during the late 1980s and 1990s. He teamed with Helmut Hessler as the Stormtroopers. He also made occasional appearances in the World Wrestling Federation and World Championship Wrestling early in his career.

== Professional wrestling career ==
Coates made his professional wrestling debut in 1986. In 1989, he worked for the World Wrestling Federation (WWF) as a jobber working against Andre the Giant, Bad News Brown, Big Boss Man, Akeem and Haku. He left the WWF in 1990.

From 1990 to 1992, Coates worked for World Championship Wrestling (WCW) working against Lex Luger, Sting, Bobby Eaton, Steve Austin, and the Steiner Brothers.

In 1990, he made his debut for South Atlantic Pro Wrestling, losing to Ricky Steamboat. In 1991, he teamed up with Helmut Hessler as the Storm Troopers as they feuded with Tommy Angel and Tommy Seabolt. The Storm Troopers defeated The Fantastics - Bobby Fulton and Jackie Fulton for the SAPW Tag Team Championship. They dropped the titles to Angel and Seabolt. They left SAPW in 1992.

In 1992, Coates and Hessler worked in Puerto Rico for World Wrestling Council as the German Storm Troopers. They feuded with Ray Gonzalez and Rex King.

Coates would make his debut for Pro Wrestling Federation as the Russian Assassin in 1992. During the 1990s, Coates would work in independent promotions in North Carolina and South Carolina.

In 1997, Coates made his debut for New Dimension Wrestling in Sailsbury, North Carolina as Madd Maxx losing to Bobby Fulton. Madd Maxx won the NDW Heavyweight Championship when he defeated Rick Link on November 8, 1997 in Burlington, North Carolina. He dropped the title to Buddy Landel on June 27, 1998.

From 1998 to 1999, he worked for the Hardy Boyz' promotion OMEGA Championship Wrestling.

He returned to the WWF in June 1999 when he lost to Christian and the next night to Kurt Angle.

In March 2000, he returned to WCW for two matches, losing to Emory Hale and a handicap match teaming with Elix Skipper and Sonny Siaki losing to Shannon Moore and Evan Karagias.

He lost to Scotty 2 Hotty on WWF Jakked on December 18, 2000 (aired December 23).

Coates made his final appearances in WWE (formerly WWF) on November 25 and 26, 2002. He lost to Sean O'Haire on Sunday Night Heat and temaed with Pat Cusick losing to Albert and Bill DeMott on WWE Velocity. Afterwards he retired from wrestling.

Coates came out of retirement after a seventeen-year absence on November 23, 2019 when he defeated Preston Quinn at RAGE Christmas for Kids at the Roanoke Rapids Police Club in Roanoke Rapids, North Carolina.

On March 3, 2023 he would team with CW Anderson, and Rob McBride to defeat Big Money Inc. (Aubrey Wright, Ivan Ali and Lee Valiant) and Jody Collins in a 4 on 3 handicap match at Chair City Clash 10 in Thomasville, North Carolina.

His final match was on March 22, 2025 teaming with Chase Emery as they lost to XLG (G-Moniy and Gem Stone) at MATW Smashville Showdown in Nashville, North Carolina.

== Death ==
Coates died on September 8, 2025, in his sleep. He was 58. Coates had been experiencing several cardiac issues after bypass surgery. On Saturday, his wife revealed that he had undergone four operations the previous week.

== Championships and accomplishments ==
- Pro Wrestling Illustrated
  - PWI ranked him # 383 of the 500 best singles wrestlers of the PWI 500 in 1992
- National Wrestling Alliance
  - NWA World Tag Team Championship (2 times) – with Agent Gunn
- New Dimension Wrestling
  - NDW Heavyweight Championship (1 time)
- Pro Wrestling America
  - PWA Tag Team Championship (2 times) – with German Stormtrooper #1
- Pro Wrestling Federation
  - PWF Heavyweight Championship (1 time)
- South Atlantic Pro Wrestling
  - SAPW Tag Team Championship (1 time) – with Helmut Hessler
