= Tommy Angel (wrestler) =

American retired professional wrestler

Personal information
- Born: Thomas Barrett North Carolina, United States

Professional wrestling career
- Ring name(s): Tommy Angel; American Eagle
- Billed height: 6 ft 0 in (183 cm)
- Billed weight: 235 lb (107 kg)
- Trained by: Nelson Royal
- Debut: 1987
- Retired: 1994

Thomas Barrett is an American retired professional wrestler, best known under the ring name Tommy Angel. He appeared as a jobber to the stars in World Championship Wrestling and World Wrestling Federation between 1987 and 1994. He also appeared in Smoky Mountain Wrestling, South Atlantic Pro Wrestling and All Japan Pro Wrestling.

== Professional wrestling career ==
Angel began his professional wrestling career in 1987 for Jim Crockett Promotions. In 1988, Angel worked made his debut for the World Wrestling Federation in 1988 losing to Rick Rude, One Man Gang, Brutus Beefcake, Ted DiBiase, Dino Bravo and Iron Mike Sharpe.

In November 1988, Jim Crockett Promotions was bought by Ted Turner and changed its location to Atlanta and its name to World Championship Wrestling where he spent most of his career there. He lost to Sting, Steiner Brothers, Ron Simmons, Sid Vicious (wrestler), and Steve Austin. He left WCW in 1991. In 1991, he returned to the WWF working against The Undertaker and Mr. Perfect.

Angel debuted in 1991 for South Atlantic Pro Wrestling where he teamed with Tommy Seabolt as the TNT Express. They won the SAPW Tag Team Championship defeating the German Stormtroppers. Angel left South Atlantic in 1992. That same year, he worked for Smoky Mountain Wrestling and Universal Wrestling Federation (Herb Abrams).

Angel made his only tour to Japan in 1992 working for All Japan Pro Wrestling.

In 1992, he returned to WCW he worked against Paul Orndorff, Diamond Dallas Page, Van Hammer, The Nasty Boys, and Barry Windham. In 1993, his only victory in WCW was against Joe Cruz. He left WCW in 1994. Angel returned to the WWF in 1994 losing to Rick Martel, Adam Bomb and Diesel. Later that year he finished his wrestling career in Tennessee and retired.

== Championships and accomplishments ==
- Atlantic Pro Wrestling
  - ACW Television Champion (1 time)
- South Atlantic Pro Wrestling
  - SAPW Tag Team Titles with - Tommy Seabolt (1)
- Pro Wrestling Illustrated
  - PWI ranked Tommy Angel # 380 of the 500 best singles wrestlers of the PWI 500 in 1991
