= South Atlantic Pro Wrestling =

American professional wrestling promotion

- Acronym: SAPW
- Founded: 1990
- Defunct: 1992
- Style: Rasslin'
- Headquarters: Charlotte, North Carolina
- Founder(s): George Scott; John Ringley; Mike Lamberth
- Owner(s): Paul Jones; Frank Dusek
- Formerly: North American Wrestling Association

South Atlantic Pro Wrestling (SAPW, formerly known as the North American Wrestling Association) was a professional wrestling promotion founded by George Scott, John Ringley and Mike Lamberth in Charlotte, North Carolina in 1990, and later taken over by Paul Jones and Frank Dusek. It was the last effort to revive the NWA's Mid-Atlantic wrestling territory.

== History and overview ==
=== Formation ===
The North American Wrestling Association was founded by George Scott, John Ringley and Mike Lamberth in January 1990. The first event and TV taping was held in Sumter, South Carolina on February 8, 1990. Matches from these shows were first shown in March and April 1990.

The first North American Heavyweight Champion, Robert Fuller, won the championship in an 18-man tournament by defeating Ricky Steamboat in the finals on June 30, 1990, in Winston-Salem, North Carolina. The first North American Tag Team Champions were crowned in a tournament final that same month, also in Winston-Salem, when The Nasty Boys defeated Danny Allen and Bob Emery.

Scott and Ringley, as former Jim Crockett Promotions employees, recognized the importance of television exposure. The group purchased all the old JCP market stations in the Carolinas along with the original timeslots. In July 1990, Paul Jones and Frank Dusek took over the promotion and negotiated a deal with the America One Network to air "South Atlantic Pro Wrestling" on Friday nights later that year.

=== Territorial reach ===
George Scott and his partners hoped to revive the National Wrestling Alliance's old Mid-Atlantic wrestling territory which traditionally covered Virginia, North Carolina and South Carolina. After securing key television markets in the Carolinas, the promotion signed contracts with all the old Jim Crockett Promotions arenas to hold pro wrestling shows on a regular basis. Within the first year of operation, house shows and TV tapings were held at the Columbia Township Auditorium, Grady Cole Center, Greenwood Civic Center, Limestone College Gym, and the Winston-Salem Memorial Coliseum. SAPW tours also included high school gyms, rec centers, and fairs in cities throughout Georgia, Mississippi, Virginia, and the Carolinas. In August 1991, SAPW held a benefit show in Wentworth, North Carolina for Operation Family Shield, a support group established by then Governor Jim Martin, that provided financial assistance to military families of North Carolina National Guardsmen and U.S. Army reservists stationed in the Persian Gulf.

=== Notable talent ===
SAPW featured many Mid-Atlantic veterans such as Big John Studd, Bob Orton Jr., Ivan Koloff, Junkyard Dog, Manny Fernandez, Matt Bourne, Paul Jones, Randy Colley, Ricky Steamboat, Robert Fuller, Ron Garvin, Tommy Rich, Wahoo McDaniel, and The Fantastics. Other legends such as Lou Thesz, Johnny Weaver, and Tim Woods appeared alongside SAPW announcer Ted Webb as special guest commentators for "South Atlantic Pro Wrestling". Bob Caudle also joined the promotion in late 1991. Henry Marcus, another longtime JCP associate, promoted his final house show for the group.

The promotion also showcased younger talent, including Baron Samdi, Curtis Thompson, Dean Malenko, Nelson Frazier, The Patriot, P. N. News, Ric Savage, Rob Van Dam, Vince Torelli, The American Pit Bulldogs and The Nasty Boys. Chris Chavis, who had trained under Larry Sharpe at the Monster Factory prior to his SAPW debut, was its first breakout star. During his first year in SAPW, he was voted 3rd runner up for Rookie of the Year in Pro Wrestling Illustrated. Chavis was also awarded the SAPW Heavyweight Championship before being signed to the World Wrestling Federation. Chavis attributed his early success to Ricky Steamboat and Wahoo McDaniel who mentored him during his time in SAPW.

=== Style and controversy ===
SAPW catered to traditional Southern wrestling fans that had grown up during the Mid-Atlantic territory's "glory years" of previous decades. The promoters promised a back-to-basics approach to pro wrestling that provided an alternative to "sports entertainment" marketed by the World Wrestling Federation. They were also critical of the independent promotions beginning to emerge with the weakening of the NWA. Its "family friendly" environment was not without controversy, however, as a real-life fight between Ken Shamrock and The Nasty Boys left the future UFC fighter hospitalized. The drunken brawl had reportedly woken up other wrestlers staying in the motel. Frank Dusek claimed that it was only the intervention of Robert Fuller and the American Pit Bulldogs (Rex and Spike) that prevented Knobbs and Saggs from throwing the unconscious wrestler over the third floor balcony of their motel room. Shamrock suffered a broken sternum and a caved in eye socket as a result of the two-on-one attack.

=== World Wrestling Council ===
The promotion had a brief association with the World Wrestling Council after Manny Fernandez became SAPW's booker in August 1991. In November of that year, Fernandez was "suspended" from the promotion when he took the SAPW Heavyweight Championship to Puerto Rico. This led to a cross promotional effort with the WWC which saw Fernandez defend the belt as the "WWC North America Champion".

=== Demise ===
In spite of a strong start, the promotion operated at a loss during its first six months in business. George Scott lost an estimated $600,000 before deciding to cut his losses and retire to Florida. There was a noticeable drop in quality after the original investors pulled out and many of the promotion's top stars left the area. "South Atlantic Pro Wrestling" remained in the Friday night death slot throughout its two-year run. Jones and Dusek eventually sold SAPW to North Carolina promoter Greg Price who ran the promotion during its final year. Its last official show was held in Cerro Gordo, North Carolina on August 1, 1992.

== Alumni ==
Male wrestlers

| Birth name: | Ring name(s): | Tenure: | Notes |
|---|---|---|---|
| Bradley Anderson | Brad Anderson; The Viper | 1990–1991 | |
| Scott Antol | Scott Studd | 1992 | |
| Roger Barnes | Ronnie Garvin | 1991 | |
| Tom Barrett | Tommy Angel | 1991–1992 | |
| Richard Blood | Ricky Steamboat | 1990 | |
| Carl Brantley | Vladimir Koloff | 1991–1992 | |
| Jerry Bragg | Jay Eagle | 1990 | |
| Neil Caricofe^{†} | Neil Superior | 1992 | |
| Chris Chavis | Chris Chavis | 1990–1991 | |
| Bryan Clark | The Nightstalker | 1992 | |
| Charles Coates | Chuck Coates | 1990 | |
| Randy Colley | Randy Colley | 1990 | |
| Bill Crouch | Butch Malone; The White Knight | 1990–1991; 1992 | |
| Anthony Durante | American Bulldog Spike; Pitbulldog Spike | 1990–1991 | |
| Emanuel Fernandez | Manny Fernandez | 1991^{WWC} | |
| Chad J. Floyd^{†} | Chaz Rocco | 1992 | |
| Nelson Frazier Jr.^{†} | Death Squad #1 | 1992 | |
| Paul Frederik | Paul Jones | 1990–1991 | |
| Tim Frye | The Storm Trooper | 1991 | |
| Carlos González | Carlos Colón | 1991^{WWC} | |
| Chris Hamrick | The Black Scorpion | 1992 | |
| George Hines | Jackie Fulton | 1990–1991 | |
| James Hines | Bobby Fulton | 1990–1991 | |
| Robert Horne | Death Squad #2 | 1992 | |
| Mike Howell | Mike Maverick | 1990–1992 | |
| Koji Ishinriki | Sumo Riki | 1991 | |
| Cary Jackson^{†} | Colt Steele | 1990; 1992 | |
| Kenneth Kilpatrick | Vince Torelli | 1990–1991 | |
| Dennis Knight | Tex Sallinger | 1990 | |
| Brian Yandrisovitz | Brian Knobbs | 1990 | |
| Wallace Lane | Stan Lane | 1991 | |
| Gene Ligon | Gene Ligon; Thunderfoot | 1990 | |
| Edward McDaniel^{†} | Wahoo McDaniel | 1991–1992 | |
| John Minton^{†} | Big John Studd | 1990 | |
| Mike Morgan | Rip Morgan | 1990 | |
| Ricky Nelson | Rikki Nelson | 1991 | |
| Paul Neu | P. N. News | 1992 | |
| Jack Noles | Jack Lord | 1990 | |
| Bob Orton, Jr. | Bob Orton, Jr. | 1990 | |
| Matt Osborne | Matt Borne; The Maniac | 1990 | |
| Jim Painter | Smasher Sloan | 1991 | |
| Oreal Perras^{†} | Ivan Koloff | 1990–1992 | |
| Thomas Richardson | Tommy Rich | 1992 | |
| Ken Rinehurst | Jack Victory | 1990 | |
| Sylvester Ritter^{†} | Junkyard Dog | 1991–1992 | |
| Robert Lee Ross, Jr. | Ranger Ross | 1990–1991 | |
| Gary Rowell | Gary Royal | 1991 | |
| Jerome Saganowich | Jerry Sags | 1990 | |
| Frank L. Santen | Frank Dusek | 1990; 1991 | |
| Dean Simon | Dean Malenko | 1990 | |
| Michael Smith | Sam Houston | 1990–1991 | |
| Robert Szatkowski | Rob Van Dam; Rob Zakowski | 1991–1992 | |
| Papaliitele Taogaga | Siva Afi | 1991 | |
| Johnnie Thomas III^{†} | J.T. Thomas | 1990 | |
| Curtis Thompson | Curtis Thompson | 1990–1991 | |
| Robert Welch | Robert Fuller | 1990–1991 | |
| Pezavan Whatley^{†} | Shaska Whatley | 1991–1992 | |
| Del Wilkes | The Patriot | 1991 ^{GWF} 1992 | |
| Richard Williams^{†} | Rick Wilson; Ricky Wilson | 1990 | |
| Gary Wolfe | American Bulldog Rex; Pitbulldog Rex | 1990–1991 | |
| Charles Wright | Baron Samedi | 1990 | |
| Unknown | Allen Kensey; Alan Kinsey | 1990 | |
| Richie Scruggs | American GI | 1991 | |
| Unknown | The Assassin | 1992 | |
| Unknown | Beau Ragin; Bo Ragin; Bob Ragin | 1990 | |
| Unknown | Bob Emory | 1990; 1991 | |
| Unknown | Brian Johnson | 1990 | |
| Unknown | Bubba Kirk | 1990 | |
| Unknown | Buddy Blonz | 1992 | |
| Unknown | Chuck Roberts | 1990 | |
| Unknown | Clarence Sowell | 1990 | |
| Unknown | Colin Orsack; The Texas Battleship | 1990 | |
| Unknown | Cruel Connection I | 1990; 1991 | |
| Unknown | Cruel Connection II | 1991 | |
| Unknown | The Crusader | 1991 | |
| Unknown | Dan Grundy | 1990 | |
| Unknown | Darrell Woodworth | 1990 | |
| Unknown | Darrin Stevens | 1992 | |
| Unknown | David Isley | 1990; 1992 | |
| Unknown | David Sledge | 1990 | |
| Unknown | David Studemire | 1990 | |
| Unknown | David Taylor | 1991–1992 | |
| Unknown | Dennis Fowler | 1990 | |
| Unknown | Denny Brown; The Red Raider | 1991 | |
| Unknown | Derrick Dukes | 1990 | |
| Unknown | Dr. X | 1990 | |
| Unknown | Ebony Austin | 1992 | |
| Unknown | The Enforcer | 1990 | |
| Unknown | Eric Cooper | 1990 | |
| Unknown | Gary Booth | 1990 | |
| Unknown | Gary Simone | 1990 | |
| Unknown | The Gladiator | 1990 | |
| Unknown | Gordon Lambert | 1992 | |
| Unknown | The Grappler | 1990–1992 | |
| Unknown | Greg Bobchick | 1991–1992 | |
| Unknown | Greg Brown | 1990 | |
| Unknown | The Heartthrob | 1991 | |
| Unknown | Helmut Hessler | 1991–1992 | |
| Unknown | Hunter Thompson | 1990 | |
| Unknown | The Iron Man | 1990 | |
| Unknown | Jeff Collette | 1991 | |
| Unknown | Jeff Husker | 1991–1992 | |
| Unknown | Jerry Price | 1990 | |
| Unknown | Jerry Rose | 1990; 1991 | |
| Unknown | Jim Elliot | 1990 | |
| Unknown | Jimmy Johnson | 1991 | |
| Unknown | Johnny Blitz | 1992 | |
| Unknown | Johnny B. Goode | 1991 | |
| Unknown | Johnny Del Rio | 1991–1992 | |
| Unknown | Johnny Kidd | 1992 | |
| Unknown | Johnny Z Johnny Ziegler | 1990 | |
| Unknown | Kokla Khan | 1990 | |
| Unknown | Lee Ramsey | 1990 | |
| Unknown | Luther D | 1990 | |
| Unknown | Lynn Wagner | 1990 | |
| Unknown | Mac Mason | 1990 | |
| Unknown | Mad Bull | 1992 | |
| Unknown | Madd Maxx | 1992 | |
| Unknown | The Maneater | 1990–1991 | |
| Unknown | Mark Fleming | 1990 | |
| Unknown | The Masked Bammer | 1992 | |
| Unknown | Matt Burns; Mat Burns | 1991 | |
| Unknown | Matt Dozer | 1992 | |
| Unknown | The Mighty Atar | 1991–1992 | |
| Unknown | Mike Cavanar | 1990 | |
| Unknown | Mike Crockett | 1990 | |
| Unknown | Mike Curevich | 1990 | |
| Unknown | Mike Rexx | 1990 | |
| Unknown | Mike Somani | 1990 | |
| Unknown | Mike Starr | 1991–1992 | |
| Unknown | Mike Wallace | 1990 | |
| Unknown | Nicky Hawks | 1991–1992 | |
| Unknown | The Ninja | 1992 | |
| Unknown | Richard Beck | 1992 | |
| Unknown | Rick Slagle; Ringlord Rick | 1990–1992 | |
| Unknown | Rick Starr | 1990; 1991 | |
| Unknown | Robert Booth | 1990 | |
| Unknown | Robert Campbell | 1990–1991 | |
| Unknown | Roughhouse Graham | 1991–1992 | |
| Unknown | The Russian Assassin | 1991 | |
| Unknown | Rusty Riddle | 1992 | |
| Unknown | Rusty Stevens | 1990 | |
| Unknown | Sammy Martin; Sammy Morton | 1990 | |
| Unknown | Scotty Piper | 1991 | |
| Unknown | Speedy Gonzales; Ringlord Speedy | 1990–1992 | |
| Unknown | The Starman | 1991 | |
| Unknown | Stone Cold | 1992 | |
| Unknown | Thomas St. John | 1990 | |
| Tommy Pound | The Convict | 1991-92 | |
| Unknown | TJ Roberts | 1992 | |
| Unknown | Tom Atlas | 1990 | |
| Unknown | Tom Lively | 1990 | |
| Unknown | Tommy Gunn | 1991–1992 | |
| Unknown | Tommy Landell | 1990–1991 | |
| Unknown | Tommy Seabolt | 1990–1992 | |
| Unknown | Trent Knight | 1990–1991 | |
| Unknown | Trooper Max | 1992 | |
| Unknown | Tyrone Knox | 1991–1992 | |
| Unknown | William Ford | 1990 | |
| Unknown | William Winfield | 1992 | |
| Unknown | Willie Clay | 1992 | |

Female wrestlers

| Birth name: | Ring name(s): | Tenure: | Notes |
|---|---|---|---|
| Peggy Lee | Lady X Peggy Lee Leather | 1991–1992 | |
| Selina Majors | Bambi | 1991–1992 | |
| Velvet Mykietowich | Velvet McIntyre | 1992 | |
| Patty Seymour | Leilani Kai | 1991 | |
| Unknown | Betty Blonz | 1992 | |
| Unknown | Stacy Lee Austin | 1992 | |
| Unknown | Susie Krueger | 1992 | |

Stables and tag teams

| Tag team/Stable(s) | Members | Tenure(s) |
|---|---|---|
| The American Bulldogs / The Pit Bulldogs | Rex and Spike | 1990–1991 |
| The Death Squad | Death Squad #1 and Death Squad #2 | 1992 |
| The German Stormtroopers / The Stormtroopers | Helmut Hessler and Hans Schmidt | 1991 |
| The Nasty Boys | Brian Knobs and Jerry Sags | 1990 |
| The New Fantastics | Bobby Fulton and Jackie Fulton | 1990–1991 |
| Paul Jones' Rangers | Paul Jones, Ranger Ross, Bo Ragin, Vince Torelli and Chris Chavis | 1990 |
| The Royal Family | Jack Victory and Rip Morgan | 1990 |
| The Russians | Ivan Koloff and Vladimir Koloff | 1992 |
| The Ringlords | Ringlord Rick and Ringlord Speedy | 1990–1992 |
| The Stud Stable | Robert Fuller, Matt Borne, Tex Salenger, Curtis Thompson, The Maneater, Luther D, The Nasty Boys, and The Pitbulldogs | 1990 |
| The TNT Express | Tommy Seabolt and Tommy Angel | 1991–1992 |

Managers and valets

| Birth name: | Ring name(s): | Tenure: | Notes |
|---|---|---|---|
| Kevin Casey | Kevin "The Truth" Casey | 1991 | |
| Paul Frederik | Paul Jones | 1990–1991 | |
| Robert Welch | Robert Fuller | 1990–1991 | |

Commentators and interviewers

| Birth name: | Ring name(s): | Tenure: | Notes |
|---|---|---|---|
| Richard Blood | Ricky Steamboat | 1990 | Guest color commentator |
| Paul Frederik | Paul Jones | 1990–1991 | Color commentator |
| Kenneth Kilpatrick | Vince Torelli | 1990 | Color commentator |
| Gene Ligon | Gene Ligon | 1990 | Color commentator |
| John Minton^{†} | Big John Studd | 1990 | Guest color commentator |
| Frank L. Santen | Frank Dusek | 1990–1991 | Play-by-play commentator |
| George Scott^{†} | George Scott | 1990 | Guest color commentator |
| George Scott, Jr. | George Scott, Jr. | 1990 | Color commentator |
| Lajos Tiza^{†} | Lou Thesz | 1990 | Guest color commentator |
| Kenneth Weaver^{†} | Johnny Weaver | 1990 | Guest color commentator |
| Ted Webb | Ted Webb | 1990 | Play-by-play commentator |
| Robert Welch | Robert Fuller | 1990 | Color commentator |
| George Woodin^{†} | Mr. Wrestling | 1990 | Guest color commentator |

Referees

| Birth name: | Ring name(s): | Tenure: | Notes |
|---|---|---|---|
| Unknown | Leroy Ramsey | 1990–1991 | |
| Unknown | Byron Richards | 1990–1991 | |

Other personnel

| Birth name: | Ring name(s): | Tenure: | Notes |
|---|---|---|---|
| Paul Frederik | Paul Jones | 1990–1991 | Owner |
| Mike Lamberth | Mike Lamberth | 1990 | Owner |
| Greg Price | Greg Price | 1991–1992 | Owner |
| John Ringley | John Ringley | 1990 | Owner |
| Frank L. Santen | Frank Dusek | 1990–1991 | Owner |
| George Scott^{†} | George Scott | 1990 | Owner |

Company name to Year
| Company name: | Years: |
|---|---|
| North American Wrestling Association | 1990 |
| South Atlantic Pro Wrestling | 1990–1992 |
Notes
^{†} Indicates they are deceased.
^{‡} Indicates they died while they were employed with SAPW.
^{GWF} Indicates they were part of a talent exchange with the Global Wrestling Federation.
^{WWC} Indicates they were part of a talent exchange with the World Wrestling Council.

== Championships ==
=== SAPW Heavyweight Championship ===
| # | Wrestlers | Reign | Date | Days held | Location | Event | Notes | Ref |
|---|---|---|---|---|---|---|---|---|
| 1 | Robert Fuller | 1 | June 30, 1990 | 91 | Winston-Salem, North Carolina | Live event | Fuller defeated Ricky Steamboat in a tournament final to become the first NAWA Heavyweight Champion. In September 1990, the title was renamed the SAPW Heavyweight Championship when the promotion became South Atlantic Pro Wrestling. | |
| 2 | Paul Jones | 1 | September 2, 1990 | 27 | Kings Mountain, North Carolina | Live event | | |
| 3 | Robert Fuller | 2 | September 29, 1990 | 35 | Kings Mountain, North Carolina | Live event | | |
| — | Vacated | — | November 3, 1990 | — | Morgantown, North Carolina | Live event | The championship is vacated following a controversial title defense between Fuller and Jones. | |
| 4 | Vince Torelli | 1 | February 7, 1991 | 159 | Nassau, Bahamas | Live event | Torelli defeated Chris Chavis in a tournament final to win the vacant title. | |
| 5 | Chris Chavis | 1 | July 6 , 1991 | 46 | Pembroke , North Carolina | Live event | Defeated Vince Torelli to win SAPW title. | |
| 6 | Manny Fernandez | 2 | August 31, 1991 | 71 | Pembroke, North Carolina | Live event | | |
| — | Vacated | — | November 10, 1991 | N/A | N/A | N/A | The championship is vacated when Fernandez leaves the promotion with the title. He is subsequently suspended, however, Fernandez continues to defend the belt in the World Wrestling Council where he is billed as the "WWC North American Champion". | |
| 7 | Helmut Hessler | 1 | January 11, 1992 | 92 | Roseboro, North Carolina | Live event | Hessler defeated Wahoo McDaniel in a tournament final to win the vacant title. | |
| 8 | Neil Superior | 1 | April 12, 1992 | 119 | Hagerstown, Maryland | Live event | | |
| — | Deactivated | — | August 9, 1992 | — | N/A | N/A | When SAPW closed. | |

=== SAPW Junior Heavyweight Championship ===
| # | Wrestlers | Reign | Date | Days held | Location | Event | Notes | Ref |
|---|---|---|---|---|---|---|---|---|
| 1 | Rikki Nelson | 1 | July 8, 1991 | 42 | N/A | N/A | | |
| 2 | Denny Brown | 1 | August 19, 1991 | 356 | Charlotte, North Carolina | Live event | | |
| — | Deactivated | — | August 9, 1992 | — | N/A | N/A | When SAPW closed. | |

=== SAPW United States Heavyweight Championship ===
| # | Wrestlers | Reign | Date | Days held | Location | Event | Notes | Ref |
|---|---|---|---|---|---|---|---|---|
| 1 | Buddy Blonz | 1 | March 6, 1992 | 156 | Greensboro, North Carolina | Live event | Blonz defeated The Assassin to become the first SAPW U.S. Heavyweight Champion. | |
| — | Deactivated | — | August 9, 1992 | — | N/A | N/A | When SAPW closed. | |

=== SAPW Women's Championship ===
| # | Wrestlers | Reign | Date | Days held | Location | Event | Notes | Ref |
|---|---|---|---|---|---|---|---|---|
| 1 | Bambi | 1 | September 2, 1992 | 61 | Kings Mountain, North Carolina | N/A | | |
| — | Deactivated | — | November 2, 1992 | — | N/A | N/A | When SAPW closed. | |

=== SAPW Tag Team Championship ===
| # | Wrestlers | Reign | Date | Days held | Location | Event | Notes | Ref |
|---|---|---|---|---|---|---|---|---|
| 1 | The Nasty Boys (Brian Knobbs and Jerry Sags) | 1 | July 28, 1990 | 45 | Winston-Salem, North Carolina | Live event | The Nasty Boys defeated Danny Allen and Bob Emery in a tournament final to become the first NAWA Tag Team Champions. In September 1990, the title was renamed the SAPW Tag Team Championship when the promotion became South Atlantic Pro Wrestling. | |
| 2 | The American Pitbulldogs (Rex and Spike) | 1 | September 11, 1990 | 109 | Columbia, South Carolina | Live event | | |
| 3 | The Fantastics (Bobby Fulton and Jackie Fulton) | 1 | December 29, 1990 | 5 | Greenville, South Carolina | Live event | | |
| 4 | The Pitbulldogs | 2 | January 3, 1991 | 50 | N/A | N/A | The titles are returned to The Pitbulldogs when they fail to receive a rematch within a 15-day time period. The Fantastics tour All Japan Pro Wrestling during this period. | |
| 5 | The Fantastics | 2 | February 22, 1991 | 190 | Belford, South Carolina | Live event | | |
| 6 | The German Stormtroopers (Helmut Hessler and Hans Schmidt) | 1 | August 31, 1991 | 43 | Pembroke, North Carolina | Live event | Awarded via forfeit. | |
| 7 | TNT Express (Tommy Angel and Tommy Seabolt) | 1 | October 13, 1991 | 167 | Lincolnton, North Carolina | Live event | | |
| — | Vacated | 1 | March 28, 1992 | N/A | N/A | N/A | | |
| 8 | Chaz Rocco and Tommy Gunn | 1 | April 17, 1992 | 1 | Rocky Mount, North Carolina | Live event | Rocco and Gunn defeated The Ringlords to win the vacant title. | |
| 9 | The Ringlords (Speedy Gonzales and Rick Slagle) | 1 | April 18, 1992 | 96 | Darlington, South Carolina | Live event | | |
| 10 | Chaz Rocco ^{(2)} and Rob Van Dam | 1 | July 23, 1992 | 1 | Lake City, South Carolina | Live event | | |
| 11 | The Ringlords | 2 | July 24, 1992 | 16 | Bennettsville, South Carolina | Live event | | |
| — | Deactivated | — | August 9, 1992 | — | N/A | N/A | When SAPW closed. | |
