= Bryan Leininger =

American judoka (born 1963)

Personal information
- Born: (United States)
- Died: June 14, 2024
- Occupation: Judoka

Sport
- Sport: Judo
- Coached by: Hayward Nishioka
Medal record
Men's Judo
Representing United States
US National Championships
Gold medal – first place	US National Championships	1996

Profile at external databases
- JudoInside.com: 47893

Bryan Leininger (April 18, 1963 - June 14, 2024) was a former US National Champion in judo. He competed in the Olympic festival as a preliminary to the Olympic trials in 1991. He typically competed in the over 209lbs division.

== Judo ==
He was a national champion and a long time member of the US team. Leininger won a gold medal in the 1996 US National Championships in San Jose, California.

He is the brother of Christophe Leininger as part of the "Flying Leininger Brothers". They studied judo under Hayward Nishioka at Los Angeles City College, with their father Maurice Leininger. They additionally trained with the French national judo team. Bryan Leininger won at the Colorado State Championships, the US National Collegiate and French National Collegiate championships. He also won medals six times in the US National Championships. In 1994, Leininger won the United States Judo Association award for most improved competitor. He placed second in the 2001 World Masters Judo Championships.
