= Neil Superior =

American professional wrestler and trainer (1963 – 1996)

Personal information
- Born: Neil Allen Caricofe; April 6, 1963 Hagerstown, Maryland, U.S.
- Died: August 23, 1996 (aged 33) Ocean City, Maryland, U.S.
- Family: Dick Caricofe (father)

Professional wrestling career
- Ring name(s): Neil Superior; Sgt. Superior
- Billed height: 6 ft 5 in (196 cm)
- Billed weight: 266 lb (121 kg)
- Trained by: Afa Anoaʻi
- Debut: 1989

Neil Allen Caricofe (April 6, 1963 – August 23, 1996), better known by the ring name Neil Superior, was an American professional wrestler and trainer. A mainstay on the East Coast and Mid-Atlantic independent circuit during the 1990s, Superior was perhaps best known for his tenure in the National Wrestling League. His five year reign as NWL Heavyweight Champion is the longest in the promotion's history. In addition, Superior was the first co-holder of the NWL Tag Team Championship as one half of The Brothers Superior with Doug Superior. Superior also wrestled for International World Class Championship Wrestling and South Atlantic Pro Wrestling, where he was its last heavyweight champion, and as a preliminary wrestler for World Championship Wrestling. He died during an altercation with Ocean City police officers which resulted in a wrongful death lawsuit against the city.

== Early life ==
Neil Allen Caricofe was born on April 6, 1963, in Hagerstown, Maryland, one of two sons born to Leatrice and Richard A. "Dick" Caricofe. Graduating from North Hagerstown High School in 1981, Caricofe attended American University for two years on a scholarship. He later worked as a correctional officer in nearby Sykesville and served in the United States Army Reserve. Caricofe also did volunteer work as a Big Brother and was a member of the local parks board in his hometown.

== Professional wrestling career ==
=== Early career ===
Caricofe was trained by Afa Anoa'i at the Wild Samoan Pro Wrestling School in Whitehall, Pennsylvania and made his debut in 1989.

=== National Wrestling League ===
He and his father, Dick Caricofe, founded the All Star Wrestling League (later known as the National Wrestling League) in Hagerstown, Maryland, that same year. Caricofe formed a tag team with fellow Wild Samoan graduate Doug Stahl called The Superior Brothers, "Nasty" Neil and "Desirable" Doug Superior, respectively. They also wrestled as The Satanic Warriors. The team competed throughout Maryland and Pennsylvania as well as feuding with The Fantastics (Bobby and Jackie Fulton) during NWL tours in Hawaii and Guam. In 1989, The Brothers Superior defeated The Cream Team (Dino Casanova and Rip Sawyer) in Moorefield, West Virginia, to become first NWL Tag Team Champions. They remained champions until their breakup the following year.

During his time in NWL, he made an appearance in World Championship Wrestling as Neil Allen teaming with Keith Hart as they lost to the Nasty Boys on WCW TV on November 5, 1990.

After spitting with Stahl, Superior embarked on a singles career. One of his first major opponents was The Honky Tonk Man who he faced in Hagerstown on August 10, 1991. Superior also feuded with Rasta the Voodoo Mon. Later that year, Superior defeated Helmut Hesler to win the NWL Heavyweight Championship. The title had been vacated when John Rambo left the promotion to wrestle for Pacific Northwest Wrestling. Superior would hold the title for five years making him the longest in the promotion's history.

=== Independent circuit ===
Superior also wrestled for other independent promotions during the early-1990s including, most notably, International World Class Championship Wrestling, Main Event Wrestling and South Atlantic Pro Wrestling. On April 12, 1992, Superior defeated Helmut Hessler in Hagerstown for the SAPW Heavyweight Championship. He remained champion until the promotion's close four months later.

That fall, Superior traveled to Puerto Rico to wrestle for the Americas Wrestling Federation. On September 25, Superior defeated The Equalizer at the El Coliseo Municipal in Juana Díaz. The following night, he beat Chicky Starr at El Acrópolis in Manatí, Puerto Rico.

That same year, Superior opened his own wrestling school in Hagerstown. It became the main training facility for the National Wrestling League, later nicknamed "The House of Pain", and whose students included Spazman Brian Anthony, Slickyboy, and Professor Egon Ecton. In 1993, Superior and his school were featured in The Washington Post Magazine.

=== Return to National Wrestling League ===
Back in the NWL, Superior successfully defended his title against Dave Casanova, Jimmy Deo, Morgus the Maniac and other challengers during 1993 and 1994. On August 3, 1994, Superior won a 9-man battle royal in Front Royal, Virginia, that included Allen Anthony, Brian DeRiga, Dave Casanova, Doink the Clown, Tank Noakes, The Metal Maniac and Shane Shadows. On February 24, 1995, Superior retained his title against T. Rantula in Clear Spring, Maryland. On March 26, Superior and Jeremy Sumpter defeated Shane Shadows and Julio Shanchez at Potomac State College in Keyser, West Virginia. On November 4, 1995, Superior pinned Bodydonna Skip in Keyser to retain the NWL Heavyweight title. Two weeks later, he appeared to have lost the title to Mike Himeberger but the referee reversed the decision when it was discovered Superior's opponent had used his feet on the ropes to pin the champion. Superior continued defending the title until his sudden death in the summer of 1996. His last recorded match was against Mark Mest in Martinsburg, West Virginia, on June 30, 1996. The title remained vacant until John Rambo defeated "Hollywood" Bob Starr the following year.

== Death ==
=== Incident ===
Early on the morning of August 23, 1996, Caricofe, who had left his hotel room around 4:00 am, was observed acting erratically and running naked on the seventh floor of the Fenwick Inn in Ocean City, Maryland. It was believed that Caricofe had left his room accidentally and was unable to find his way back. Caricofe may have been suffering from a medical condition caused by seizures and which made him to appear to be sleepwalking. Neither was it unusual, according to the Caricofe family, for him to sleep either in his underwear or in the nude. The night desk clerk, Lisa Mulvihill, became aware of the situation when a concerned guest called the front desk. When Mulvihill went to investigate, she saw Caricofe "jumping around and banging himself against the wall". She briefly attempted to communicate with Caricofe but, finding him unresponsive, returned to the front desk and called police. Mulvihill received a second call that Caricofe was banging on the doors of several rooms. Mulvihill then made a second call to police informing them that she was returning to the seventh floor and requesting that officers meet her there.

=== Confrontation ===
Officer Freddie Howard was the first officer to arrive on the scene. Howard immediately went to the seventh floor where he witnessed Caricofe "bouncing on his tippy toes as a boxer would". Howard, believing the wrestler was under the influence of narcotics, called for backup. Caricofe did not respond to Howard's attempt to communicate. Acting Sergeant Kathleen Braeuninger and Officer Matthew Jones joined Howard a few minutes later. A restraining device, using a rope to bind the feet of a violent prisoner, was brought by a fourth officer, Officer Eric Alban. It was decided by the officers that Caricofe needed to be restrained. An attempt by Howard and Jones to handcuff Caricofe failed. They continued shouting commands to lay down on the ground and, when Caricofe failed to respond, all four officers used pepper spray which they later claimed had no effect. Caricofe then moved toward Howard and Jones, pinning Howard up against the wall, and held the officer by his shirt. Sergeant Braeuninger and Officer Alban radioed for backup, the latter calling in a "Signal 13" indicating an officer was in need of emergency assistance. Alban, Braeuninger and Jones began hitting Caricofe on his lower back and legs with nightsticks in an effort to free Howard.

=== Foot chase and beating ===
Caricofe fled down the hallway and entered a vending machine area. The officers did not follow as they felt the area was too small to safely restrain him. The officers claimed that Caricofe violently started banging his head and shoulders into the machines and sustaining face and head injuries. Caricofe was chased down seven flights of stairs and into the hotel parking lot where additional officers had arrived: Sergeants John Whittington and Edmund O'Brien, and Officers Jennifer Engstrom, James Grady, Edward Schmitt, Monica Scarpac, and Ronnie Townsend. Further efforts to subdue Caricofe using pepper foam and nightsticks were unsuccessful. Finally, Sergeant Whittington was able to grab hold allowing the rest of the officers to bring Caricofe to the ground. The group held Caricofe down while attempting to handcuff him and place the "violent prisoner restraining device" on his legs. While police were waiting for paramedics to arrive, the officers observed that Caricofe was no longer breathing. They assisted paramedics in performing CPR on Caricofe but were unable to revive him. He was pronounced dead at Atlantic General Hospital a short time later.

== Aftermath ==
The circumstances surrounding Caricofe's death were questioned during the next few weeks. It was not learned until afterwards that Caricofe had been diagnosed with a medical condition two years earlier, a neurological problem possibly resulting from a wrestling-related injury, that caused seizures and made him to appear to be sleepwalking. The Caricofe family were given little information from authorities regarding the death of their son. They learned from Gerald Minnich, director of Minnich Funeral Home in Hagerstown, who described their son's injuries, that Neil Caricofe had sustained "a possible broken nose, swelling around his eyes and a bruise on the back of his head". Caricofe's father did not initially hold Ocean City police liable for the death of his son. He was told by a Maryland State Police investigator, as well as a friend who was a state trooper at the Berlin police barracks, that his son had hit his head on a vending machine as he was running from police. The family believed that the responding police officers, three of whom were temporary seasonal patrolmen, were inexperienced and had overreacted due to Neil Caricofe's size.

A lone witness staying at the hotel was interviewed by The Washington Post disputing the official police statement. In describing the assault, she claimed that Caricofe "didn't yell back or attack but refused to lay down and kept running around". There were at least ten police officers on top of Caricofe, who put "something resembling a dog collar" around his neck just before the wrestler lost consciousness, and did not perform CPR after he had stopped breathing. Jay Hancock, then public information officer for the Ocean City Police Department, subsequently wrote a rebuttal defending the actions of his department and also criticized the credibility of the witness who chose to speak out anonymously.

An autopsy report from the Maryland Medical Examiner determined Caricofe had died as a result of heart disease combined with the ingestion of drugs and alcohol. A toxicology report found the presence of ephedrine, gamma hydroxybutyrate, anabolic steroids and ethanol in his system. They also concluded that the beating did not cause internal injuries nor were they considered life-threatening. No disciplinary action was taken against the officers involved, however, the incident was investigated by both the Worcester County Bureau of Investigation and the Worcester County State’s Attorney’s Office. The officers were allowed to continue their regular duties during the investigation. On October 8, 1996, State Attorney Joel Todd announced the results of the investigation and cleared the Ocean City Police Department of any wrongdoing.

=== Lawsuit ===
A year after Caricofe's death, his parents were still unable to find out the details of what occurred that night. The family's Baltimore attorney, Gerald Ruter, believed his clients were being stonewalled by law enforcement. The family began their own investigation and, starting on August 23, 1997, an investigator handed out 500 flyers around the Fenwick Inn hoping to find witnesses such as tourists who may have been there the previous summer. A letter to the editor was scheduled to be published in The Daily Times that weekend. The family also looked into making an appeal to the public by placing ads in major newspapers. On June 2, 1998, Caricofe's parents filed a $350 million federal lawsuit against the Ocean City Police Department, claiming that their son had died as a result of police brutality. The case was heard in U.S. District Court in Baltimore. Gerald Ruter, an attorney for the Caricofe family, claimed that the officers "jumped on him and knocked him down and emptied several cans of pepper spray into his face" causing him to suffocate to death. It was further claimed their use of nightsticks and pepper spray to subdue Neil Caricofe was unnecessary and constituted excessive force. Among those named in the lawsuit included former mayor Roland F. Powell, Police Chief David Massey and 13 Ocean City police officers who were charged with wrongful death, excessive force, inadequate training and supervision of police, and false arrest.

Ocean City officials stood by the police department. The city was represented by Guy Ayres III who argued that Caricofe's death, according to the state medical examiner's report, was the result of heart disease brought about by a combination of alcohol and bodybuilding drugs. The city had investigated the incident twice and found the accused police officers had followed department policy. Ayres maintained that Caricofe was scaring hotel guests with his erratic behavior and ignoring commands from police officers. This justified their use of nightsticks and pepper spray, however, neither had any effect on the wrestler.

Ruter disputed these version of events. While it was true Caricofe had used legal drugs to build muscle mass, Caricofe was in healthy shape and had wrestled a match in New Jersey only a few weeks before his death. Caricofe had not attacked anyone at the hotel and did not pose a threat to the police officers until they attempted to restrain him. Ruter believed that police officers should have "shown patience" as Caricofe was visibly disoriented. The legal team for the Caricofe family based their case on proving that Caricofe would still be alive had he not been beaten or pepper sprayed by police. The case was dismissed by Judge Frederic Smalkin who believed the officers had responded properly. The ruling was upheld by the 4th U.S. Circuit Court of Appeals on April 1, 2002, concluding that the officers had never resorted to deadly force.

== Neil Superior Memorial Cup ==
From 1999 to 2017, NWL booker John Rambo promoted a series of memorial shows, "Lord of the Rings", in memory of his close friend and other HoPWF/NWL personalities. The first-ever memorial show was held at the Superior Pro Wrestling Training Center on November 23, 1999, in honor of Neil Superior and Big E. Sleeze. John Rambo, who had since taken over the school, wrote a eulogy on the promotion's website. The event featured former World Wrestling Federation talent including, most notably, Doink the Clown, Gillberg and Headshrinker Samu who won the Cup in 2007. The "Neil Superior Memorial Cup", a unique multi-ring professional wrestling tournament, was included in subsequent "Lord of the Rings" shows. Dick Caricofe died on May 14, 2021, at 80.

Year	Name	Date	Location	Notes
1999	N/A	November 23, 1999	Hagerstown, Maryland	
2004	Leslie Leatherman	August 14, 2004	Newville, Pennsylvania	
2005	Jason Static	September 24, 2005	Newville, Pennsylvania	
2006	Gutterboy	September 23, 2006	Newville, Pennsylvania	
2007	Headshrinker Samu	September 22, 2007	Martinsburg, West Virginia	
2010	Blackhawk	September 25, 2010	Martinsburg, West Virginia	

== Championships and accomplishments ==
- National Wrestling League
  - NWL Heavyweight Championship (2 times)
  - NWL Tag Team Championship (1 time, first) – with Doug Superior
- Pro Wrestling Illustrated
  - PWI ranked him 149 of the top 500 singles wrestlers in the PWI 500 in 1992
- South Atlantic Pro Wrestling
  - SAPW Heavyweight Championship (1 time)
