= Rip Sawyer =

American professional wrestler (born 1965)

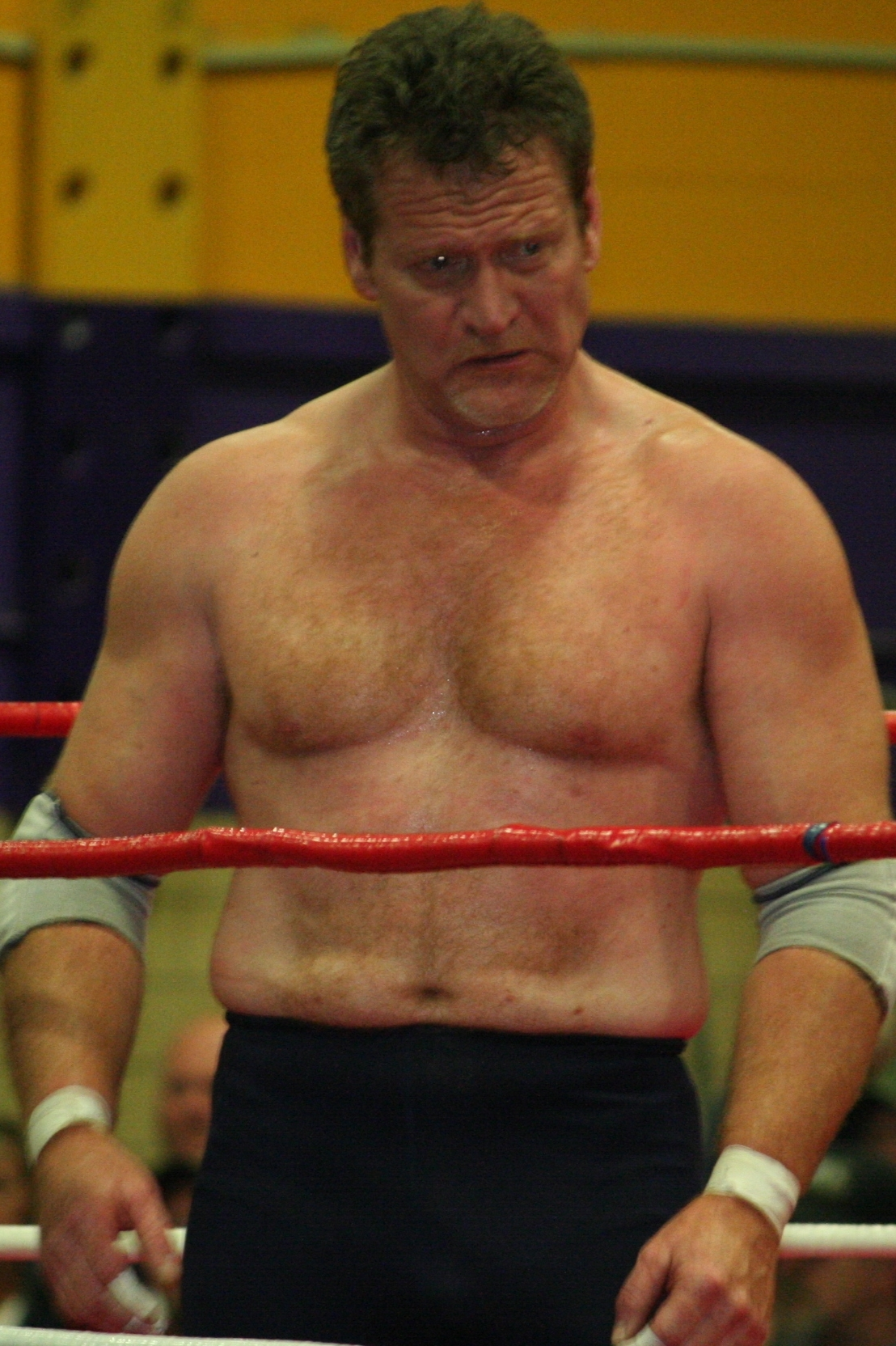
- Rip Sawyer in April 2013

Personal information
- Born: Sidney F. Garrison; January 26, 1965 (age 61) Pennsylvania, United States

Professional wrestling career
- Ring name(s): Rip Sawyer; Sid Garrison
- Debut: 1988

Sidney F. Garrison (born January 26, 1965) is a retired American professional wrestler, better known by his ring name Rip Sawyer. He competed in the Mid-Atlantic and East Coast independent circuit during the late 1980s and early 1990s. As one-half of The Cream Team with longtime tag team partner Dino Casanova, they won the MEWF Tag Team Championship in the Mid-Eastern Wrestling Federation in 1991. Defending the title for over 10 months, they were the promotion's longest reigning champions.

The team also had short stints in Eastern Championship Wrestling and the National Wrestling League. Prior to his retirement in 1995, Sawyer briefly appeared in World Championship Wrestling with Rip Rogers As well as the WWF on Monday Night Raw battling Diesel in singles action. In recent years Rip has competed in indy promotions throughout VA such as AWE and TCW.

== Professional wrestling career ==
=== Early career (1988–1991) ===
Making his debut around 1988, Rip Sawyer spent his early career in the Philadelphia area. In May 1988, they defeated International World Class Championship Wrestling's Billion Dollar Babies (G.Q. Stratus & Mike Sampson) in a tournament final to become the first tag team champions for Max Thrasher's Atlantic Wrestling Federation.

On August 27 of that year, he teamed with Diamond Dave in a tag team match against The Jersey Boys for a benefit show held at the Bavarian Club in Northeast Philadelphia. Other wrestlers on the card included King Kaluha, Larry Winters, The Cheetah Kid and Jules Strongbow. At the end of the year, he began teaming with David Casanova as The Cream Team and, on December 17, they faced The Rock 'n' Roll Express (Ricky Morton & Robert Gibson) for the Virginia Wrestling Association tag team titles. Successful on the Mid-Atlantic indy circuit, they wrestled The Brothers Superior (Doug Superior & Neil Superior) in a match to crown the first NWL Tag Team Champions in 1989.

=== Mid-Eastern Wrestling Federation (1991–1992) ===
In early 1991, Sawyer and Casanova joined the Mid-Eastern Wrestling Federation where they became one of the promotion's earliest stars. They appeared at the MEWF's debut show where, on August 2, 1991, they battled the Lords of Darkness (Pain & Agony) for the MEWF Tag Team Championship. Although losing the match, they won the titles two months later when they defeated Agony and Bubba Monroe, substituting for an injured Agony, on December 21, 1991. That same month, after more than three years as champions, the Cream Team lost the AWF Tag Team titles to the Hellhounds in York, Pennsylvania.

Sawyer and Casanova would defend the MEWF belts for nearly a year before leaving the promotion for Eastern Championship Wrestling] in the Fall of 1992. Also that year, the team became the first-ever tag team champions for Atlantic Coast Wrestling Federation. Prior to this, Sawyer became friends with future ECW star Hack Myers. According to Myers, it was Sawyer who gave him the idea to grow his trademark beard to resemble Danzig.

=== Eastern Championship Wrestling (1992) ===
On September 12, 1992, The Cream Team made their Eastern Championship Wrestling (ECW debut) defeating The Hell Riders (E.Z. Ryder & H.D. Ryder) at The Aztec Club in Philadelphia, Pennsylvania. On October 3, they teamed with Glen Osbourne in a six-man tag team match to defeat Max Thrasher and The Super Destroyers (Doug Stahl & A. J. Petrucci) at the Taber Youth Association. Weeks later at Philadelphia's The Chestnut Cabaret, Sawyer and Cassanova challenged The Super Destroyers for the ECW Tag Team Championship but failed to win the belts.

=== Independent circuit and retirement (1992–1994) ===
At the beginning of 1992, DiMeglio and Sawyer had regained the AWF Tag Team titles from the Hellhounds. The two men remained champions until their breakup in May 1993. DiMeglio and Nick Tarentino, as "The Goodfellows", defeated Rip Sawyer and A. J. Fritzoid for the belts in York that same month and held the belts until the promotion's close that same year.

Going their separate ways, Casanova returned to MEWF while Sawyer spent the rest of his career in various independents. A year later, he tried his luck in American Commonwealth Wrestling. He wrestled fellow MEWF veteran Max Thrasher on June 11, 1993, and Rick "The Model" Martel in East York, Pennsylvania two months later. He eventually won the promotion's heavyweight title and held it until March 26, 1994. Shortly before ACW closed, Sawyer lost to Chris Benoit in Cocolamus, Pennsylvania on April 22, 1994. In one of his last matches, Sawyer teamed with Rip Rogers in a tag team match against The Nasty Boys (Brian Knobs and Jerry Sags) at WCW Saturday Night on February 18, 1995.

== Championships and accomplishments ==
- American Commonwealth Wrestling
  - ACW Junior Heavyweight Championship (1 time)
- Atlantic Coast Wrestling Federation
  - ACWF Tag Team Championship (1 time) – with David Casanova
- Atlantic States Wrestling Alliance
  - ASWA Tag Team Championship (2 times) – with David Casanova
- Atlantic Wrestling Federation
  - AWF Tag Team Championship (1 time) – with David Casanova
- Maryland Championship Wrestling
  - MCW Hall of Fame (Class of 2010)
- Mid-Eastern Wrestling Federation
  - MEWF Tag Team Championship (1 time) – with David Casanova
- Pro Wrestling Illustrated
  - PWI ranked him # 389 of the 500 best singles wrestlers of the PWI 500 in 1994
- Universal Independent Wrestling
  - UIW Tag Team Championship (1 time) – with David Casanova
- Virginia Wrestling Association
  - VWA Tag Team Championship (6 times) – with David Casanova
- Wrestling Independent Network
  - WIN Tag Team Championship (1 time) – with David Casanova
