= Ken Shamrock =

American professional wrestler and mixed martial arts fighter (born 1964)

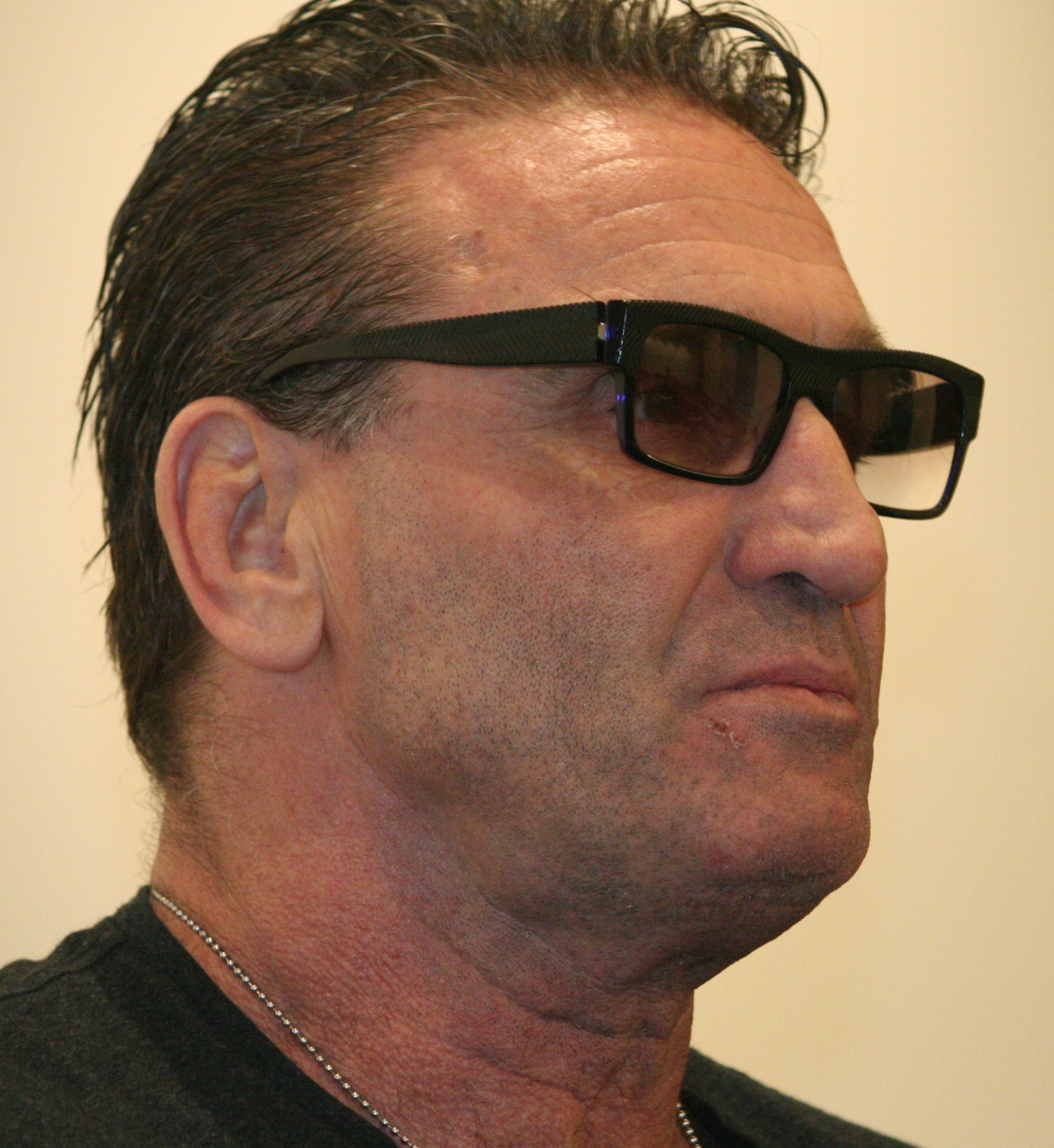
- Shamrock in 2016
- Born: Kenneth Wayne Kilpatrick; February 11, 1964 (age 62); Warner Robins, Georgia, U.S.
- Other names: The World's Most Dangerous Man
- Height: 6 ft 1 in (185 cm)
- Weight: 212 lb (96 kg; 15 st 2 lb)
- Division: Heavyweight; Light Heavyweight
- Reach: 73 in (185 cm)
- Style: Shootfighting
- Fighting out of: Reno, Nevada
- Team: Lion's Den
- Teacher: Masakatsu Funaki
- Years active: 1993–1996; 2000–2002, 2004–2006, 2008–2010; 2015–2016 (MMA); 1994 (Kickboxing); 1989–1994; 1997–1999; 2000; 2002–2004; 2009; 2018–2022 (Professional wrestling)

Kickboxing record
- Total: 1
- Wins: 0
- Losses: 1
- By knockout: 1
- Draws: 0

Mixed martial arts record
- Total: 47
- Wins: 28
- By knockout: 3
- By submission: 22
- By decision: 3
- Losses: 17
- By knockout: 11
- By submission: 4
- By decision: 2
- Draws: 2

Other information
- Spouse: Tina Ramirez (m. 1985; div. 2002) Tonya Shamrock (m. 2005)
- Children: 7, including 3 step-children
- Notable relatives: Frank Shamrock (adopted brother)
- Mixed martial arts record from Sherdog
- Professional wrestling career
- Ring name(s): Ken Shamrock; Shamrock; Vince Torelli; Wayne Shamrock
- Billed height: 6 ft 1 in (185 cm)
- Billed weight: 243 lb (110 kg)
- Billed from: Sacramento, California; San Diego, California
- Trained by: Nelson Royal; Bob Sawyer; Buzz Sawyer; Bret Hart; Leo Burke; Gene Anderson
- Debut: 1989
- Retired: August 6, 2022

Kenneth Wayne Shamrock (né Kilpatrick, later Nance; born February 11, 1964) is an American retired professional wrestler and mixed martial artist. He is best known for his time in Ultimate Fighting Championship (UFC), WWE and other combat sports. An inaugural inductee into the UFC Hall of Fame, Shamrock is widely regarded as an icon and pioneer of the sport. He has headlined over 15 main events and co-main events in the UFC and Pride FC and set numerous MMA pay-per-view records. In the early part of his UFC career, Shamrock was named "The World's Most Dangerous Man" by ABC News in a special called "The World's Most Dangerous Things". The moniker has stuck as his nickname.

Shamrock became known early on in the UFC for his rivalry with Royce Gracie. After fighting to a draw in the inaugural UFC "Superfight", he became the first UFC Superfight Champion when he defeated Dan Severn at UFC 6; the title was eventually replaced by the UFC Heavyweight Championship when weight categories were introduced to the UFC. He was also the first foreign MMA champion in Japan, winning the King of Pancrase Openweight title. During his reign as the UFC Superfight Champion, he was widely considered the #1 mixed martial artist in the world, and in 2008, Shamrock was ranked by Inside MMA as one of the top 10 greatest mixed martial arts fighters of all time. Fight Matrix ranks him as the ninth greatest heavyweight mixed martial artist of all time. He is the founder of the Lion's Den mixed martial arts training camp, and is the older brother of fellow fighter Frank Shamrock.

In addition to his mixed martial arts career, Shamrock has had considerable success in professional wrestling, particularly during his tenure with the World Wrestling Federation (WWF, now WWE). There, he is a one-time Intercontinental Champion, a one-time World Tag Team Champion and the 1998 King of the Ring. Shamrock also wrestled for Total Nonstop Action Wrestling, where he is a one-time NWA World Heavyweight Champion – the first world champion under the TNA banner – and a 2020 inductee in the Impact Hall of Fame. He headlined multiple pay-per-view events in both promotions, including 1997's D-Generation X: In Your House, where he challenged for the WWF Championship. Additionally, Shamrock was also one of the first wrestlers to use the shoot style of wrestling in America, being credited by WWE with popularizing the legitimate ankle lock submission hold.

== Early life ==
A "military brat," Kenneth Wayne Kilpatrick was born at Robins Air Force Base, in Warner Robins, Georgia on February 11, 1964, where he lived for his first four years. His father, Richard Kilpatrick, was a United States Air Force enlistee, and his mother, Diane Kilpatrick, was a waitress and dancer who had her first son when she was 15. Kilpatrick had three brothers and grew up in a predominantly black neighborhood of Macon, Georgia.

Kilpatrick was often left to fend for himself, and, without his parents' supervision or guidance, got into many fights. His father abandoned his family when Kilpatrick was five, later on figuring out that his father did not abandon him. Kilpatrick’s Mother ran off with his step father and didn’t say anything to Kilpatrick’s father. His mother married an Army aviator named Bob Nance, and the newly formed family moved to Napa, California, Nance's hometown. Kilpatrick and his brothers were outsiders in this community, coming from a poor background and speaking in a Southern accent. They continued to cause trouble and get into fights and began using drugs. Nance, who fought in the Vietnam War, joined the local fire department and also worked in roofing and upholstery. Kilpatrick became involved in and excelled at sports at a young age, playing in Little League baseball and Pop Warner football. Nance remembered a veteran coach telling him that he had never seen a player with as much heart and tenacity as the young Kilpatrick. Kilpatrick was not as involved with drugs as his brothers, such as his brother Richie, who enjoyed smoking marijuana and eventually using heroin intravenously, but who also played football.

At age 10, Kilpatrick ran away from home for the first time, and was stabbed by another child on the run, ending up in the hospital. When he was 13, his stepfather kicked him out of their home, and each of the brothers went their own ways. Kilpatrick lived in stolen cars and would often rob people at knifepoint as a means to survive, before being placed in a foster home. Kilpatrick went through seven group homes and served time in a juvenile hall. He moved between several more group homes before being placed in Bob Shamrock's Boys' Home in Susanville, California at age 14, where he turned his life around. Bob Shamrock legally adopted Ken as his son, and Ken changed his last name from Kilpatrick to Shamrock in Bob's honor.

At Lassen High School, Shamrock (known there as Kenny Nance) excelled in football and wrestling. Shamrock credits organized sports, as well as his adoptive father, Bob, for his life turning around. As a senior, he qualified for the state championships in wrestling, but broke his neck in practice days before the competition and underwent neck surgery. Due to the injury, he received no scholarship offers from any big colleges, and doctors told him his sports career was likely over. Against doctors' orders, he joined the Shasta College football team, where he was voted team captain in his final season. The San Diego Chargers of the National Football League later offered him a tryout, but he declined in order to pursue a career in professional wrestling, where he debuted in 1989 in the North Carolina–based South Atlantic Pro Wrestling promotion.

== Professional wrestling career ==
=== Early career (1988–1993) ===
In 1988, Shamrock trained as a professional wrestler under Buzz Sawyer, Nelson Royal, and Gene Anderson. He debuted in 1989 in Royal's North Carolina–based Atlantic Coast Wrestling promotion under the ring name Wayne Shamrock. After ACW folded, he moved on to the George Scott/Paul Jones-run company South Atlantic Pro Wrestling (which initially promoted under the banner of the North American Wrestling Association) and changed his ring name to Vince Torelli. Later he adopted the nickname "Mr. Wrestling" and a more villainous persona.

=== Japan (1990–1993) ===
In June 1990, after being inspired by Dean Malenko, Shamrock applied for the American tryouts of Japanese Universal Wrestling Federation in Florida. As it was a shoot style promotion, where real strikes and holds were used, Shamrock was put to spar legitimately against other participants, among them Bart Vale. After passing another tryout in Japan, he was eventually accepted, and in October he had his debut match in UWF, wrestling under the name of "Wayne Shamrock" and defeating Yoji Anjo. He became instantly popular and was put on a match against Masakatsu Funaki next. UWF folded shortly after, and Shamrock followed Funaki and other wrestlers to its successor promotion, Pro Wrestling Fujiwara Gumi, led by Yoshiaki Fujiwara.

Even though he had not started his mixed martial arts career yet, Shamrock had his first fighting experience in Fujiwara Gumi, as the results of many matches were chosen by having the wrestlers partake in competitive grappling at the gym. He had his first high level bout with Duane Koslowski, Dennis Koslowski's twin brother and a 1988 Summer Olympics Greco-Roman wrestler, whom Shamrock submitted twice before working their actual match. A different situation happened with Kazuo Takahashi, as he broke the script and shot on Shamrock in their November 1991 match, leading the American to fight back and knock him out with a soccer kick to the face at 1:27. They wrestled a rematch in 1992, with both wrestlers working heavily stiff, though with no more incidents. Shamrock himself praised Takahashi as a wrestler, comparing him to himself.

=== World Wrestling Federation (1997–1999) ===
==== Various feuds (1997–1998) ====
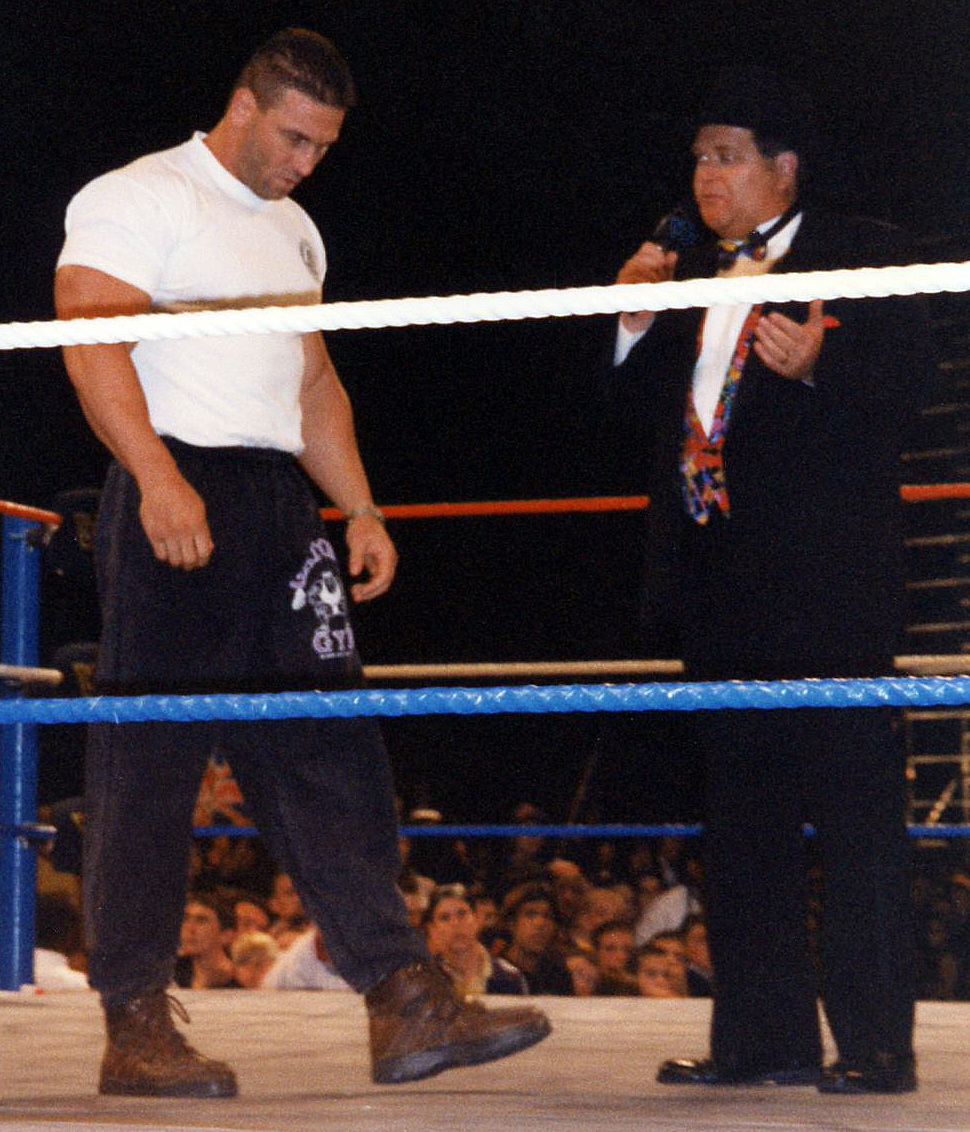
Shamrock (left) being interviewed by World Wrestling Federation commentator Jim Ross in 1997

Shamrock made his WWF debut as a face on the February 24, 1997, episode of Monday Night Raw, the same episode where Extreme Championship Wrestling promoted their first pay-per-view, Barely Legal 1997. On March 23, 1997 at WrestleMania 13, Shamrock, billed as "The World's Most Dangerous Man" — a moniker given to him by ABC News — refereed a submission match between Bret Hart and "Stone Cold" Steve Austin.

Shamrock returned to the ring following WrestleMania 13, squashing Vernon White (one of his Lion's Den students) in his debut WWF match. He went on to feud with Vader. Shamrock's feud with Vader continued in Japan, through a working agreement between the WWF and FMW, Shamrock wrestled Vader in an "Ultimate Rules" steel cage match for FMW's Kawasaki Legend 1997 super-show featuring four other promotions. The match ended in a technical knock-out win for Vader as Shamrock was suffering from internal bleeding from a lung infection and a rib injury.

Shamrock's rivalry with Bret Hart and the Hart Foundation led to his first WWF pay-per-view main event at In Your House 16: Canadian Stampede and culminated in a bout between him and The British Bulldog for the WWF European Championship at SummerSlam which Shamrock lost by disqualification after hitting the Bulldog with a can of dog food. Shamrock went on to wrestle Bret Hart to a no-contest in a match for the latter's WWF Championship on the October 21 edition of Raw. He again challenged for the WWF Championship in the main event of December's D-Generation X: In Your House, defeating champion Shawn Michaels by disqualification when Triple H interfered.

Throughout early-1998, Shamrock feuded with The Rock and his Nation of Domination stable over Rock's WWF Intercontinental Championship. On January 18 at Royal Rumble, during a match the referee Mike Chioda was distracted when The Rock's teammate D'Lo Brown's foot was stuck in the ropes, before The Rock used brass knuckles to hit him. He then disposed of the brass knuckles inside his trunks behind the referee's back. Shamrock was originally set to win the match and defeat The Rock. The Rock appealed to Chioda who discovered the foreign object. Shamrock objected to using the brass knuckles to Chioda before Chioda reversed the decision and took the Intercontinental Championship belt from Shamrock and gave it back to The Rock, making The Rock the winner via disqualification. After the match, Shamrock attacked Chioda for taking the Intercontinental Championship belt from him. Two months later on March 29 at WrestleMania XIV, Shamrock defeated The Rock, though the decision was again reversed when Shamrock continued to apply his ankle lock after The Rock had submitted, and The Rock was declared the winner by disqualification.

In June 1998, Shamrock competed in the 1998 King of the Ring tournament, eliminating Nation members Mark Henry, Kama and The Rock, as well as Jeff Jarrett, to win the tournament. Following the King of the Ring, Shamrock feuded briefly with the returning King Mabel, who had interfered to attack him in a rematch with Jarrett, and whom Shamrock defeated in a singles match injuring his leg. He next feuded with Owen Hart: Hart defeated Shamrock in a "Hart Family Dungeon match" at Fully Loaded: In Your House, and Shamrock defeated Hart in a "Lion's Den match" at SummerSlam. In September 1998, he formed a short-lived stable with Mankind and The Rock.

==== The Corporation and The Union (1998–1999) ====
Shamrock turned heel in October 1998 and won the vacant Intercontinental Championship on the October 12 episode of Raw is War, defeating X-Pac in the finals of an eight-man tournament. Shamrock retained the title in his first title defense against Mankind, six days later at Judgment Day: In Your House. In November, Shamrock participated in the Deadly Games tournament for the vacant WWF Championship at Survivor Series. He defeated Goldust in the first round, before losing to eventual winner The Rock in the quarterfinals. The following night, on Raw is War Shamrock joined Mr. McMahon's Corporation after McMahon offered him "a family" in exchange for his services. Shamrock successfully defended the Intercontinental Championship against Steve Blackman at Capital Carnage.

In December, Shamrock and his Corporation teammate Big Boss Man began pursuing the WWF Tag Team Championship, unsuccessfully challenging rival faction D-Generation X (DX) members New Age Outlaws (Billy Gunn and Road Dogg) for the titles at Rock Bottom: In Your House. However, the following night, on the December 14 episode of Raw is War, Shamrock and Boss Man defeated New Age Outlaws for the Tag Team Championship, making Shamrock a dual champion. On the January 11, 1999 episode of Raw is War, Shamrock's kayfabe sister, Ryan made her WWF debut, with both Billy Gunn and Val Venis making overtures to her. It led to a match between Shamrock and Gunn for the Intercontinental Championship at Royal Rumble. Shamrock retained the title. The following night, on the January 25 episode of Raw is War, Shamrock and Boss Man lost the Tag Team Championship to Jeff Jarrett and Owen Hart.

Val Venis continued to flirt with Ryan, leading to Shamrock defending the Intercontinental Championship against Venis at St. Valentine's Day Massacre, with Billy Gunn as the guest referee. Shamrock lost the match after Ryan slapped him and Gunn delivered a fast count. Shortly after losing the title, Shamrock also began feuding with Goldust, who also began flirting with Ryan. This led to Shamrock competing in a four way match for the Intercontinental Championship at WrestleMania XV. The reigning champion Road Dogg, was able to retain his title by pinning Goldust after Shamrock and Venis were counted out while brawling outside the ring.

In early mid-1999, the Corporation began feuding with The Undertaker and his Ministry of Darkness, with The Undertaker's minions repeatedly ambushing Shamrock and kidnapping Ryan, sacrificing her on The Undertaker's symbol. After breaking away from the Corporation, thus turning face once more, Shamrock went on to feud with The Undertaker at Backlash and lost.

After losing to The Undertaker, Shamrock, Big Show, Mankind and Test formed The Union, a stable of wrestlers in opposition to the Corporate Ministry. The Union dissolved soon after defeating the Corporate Ministry at Over the Edge in May. Shamrock briefly feuded with Jeff Jarrett before beginning a rivalry with martial artist Steve Blackman that saw he and Blackman fight one another in a series of unorthodox matches. The feud ended at SummerSlam, where Shamrock defeated Blackman in a "Lion's Den weapons match". He went on to feud with the newly debuted Chris Jericho until departing the WWF in late 1999 in order to resume his mixed martial arts career. His departure was attributed on screen to an injury inflicted by Jericho's bodyguard, Mr. Hughes.

However, during his 2024 interview with Chris Van Vliet, Shamrock revealed the reason he left WWF at the time was that he was uncomfortable with the incest storyline, which included Alicia Webb, who debuted using Shamrock's real life son's name as a part of Webb's ring name, and stated that the Montreal Screwjob Incident that caused his mentor Bret Hart to leave WWF hurt his career, as Hart was the person who helped him get into the wrestling business along with his character gimmick. Shamrock also stated that he had no creative direction by WWE due to them not knowing what to do with him.

=== Return to Japan (2000) ===
Shamrock made a one-night return on New Year's Eve 2000 teaming with UFC fighter Don Frye losing to Keiji Muto and Nobuhiko Takada at Inoki Bom-Ba-Ye in Osaka, Japan.

=== Independent circuit (2002, 2004, 2009, 2013) ===
Shamrock returned to professional wrestling in March 2002, refereeing a Ring of Honor match between Bryan Danielson and Low Ki.

Then on February 20, 2004, Shamrock defeated Sylvester Terkay in a double disqualification at Ultimate Pro Wrestling. A couple of weeks later he fought Shinsuke Nakamura to a draw at Inoki Dojo in Hollywood, California.

Shamrock made an appearance in the independent Wrestling company Juggalo Championship Wrestling during their flagship annual event, Bloodymania III, defeating Jimmy Jacobs with Dan Severn as the special guest referee.

In December 2013 at "Amo del Hexagono" in Costa Rica, he made his return by attacking Carlito and challenging him to a match.

=== Total Nonstop Action Wrestling (2002) ===
In May 2002, Shamrock signed a one-year deal with the newly formed Total Nonstop Action Wrestling (TNA) promotion. On the inaugural TNA pay-per-view on June 19, Shamrock won the vacant NWA World Heavyweight Championship in a Gauntlet for the Gold match and is recognized as TNA's first ever World Champion. After feuding with Malice for several weeks, Shamrock left TNA shortly after losing the title to Ron Killings on August 7.

=== New Japan Pro-Wrestling (2003–2004, 2022) ===
Shamrock made two appearances for New Japan Pro-Wrestling (NJPW) between 2003 and 2004. He defeated Takashi Iizuka at NJPW Ultimate Crush II in May 2003. He then lost to Josh Barnett by disqualification at NJPW Nexess.

Shamrock made a special return to NJPW on October 27, 2022, at Rumble on 44th Street, escorting Clark Connors to the ring for his match against Minoru Suzuki, in which Suzuki was victorious. After the match, Suzuki and Shamrock stared off, hinting a brawl, however both instead embraced in the ring.

=== Return to TNA (2004) ===
Shamrock briefly returned to TNA in July 2004. In his return, he only wrestled twice: for the NWA Heavyweight Championship in a gauntlet match, and an eight-man guitar-on-a-pole match. In both matches, he was unsuccessful in winning. Shamrock then departed TNA again shortly after the latter match.

=== Return to the independent circuit (2018–2019) ===
Shamrock returned to professional wrestling on November 30, 2018, for Battle Championship Wrestling in Melbourne, Australia. He defeated BCW Tag Team Champion Gabriel Wolfe in a singles match before teaming with Carlo Cannon in an impromptu BCW Tag Team Championship match against Wolfe and Big Cuz, in which Shamrock and Cannon were successful in capturing the BCW tag team titles. These matches were Shamrock's first since 2009 and his first championship since the NWA World Heavyweight Championship in the summer of 2002. They would go on to hold the titles for nine months to the day losing them to The Preston Kindred (Jonathan Preston & Sean Preston).

=== Second return to Impact Wrestling (2019–2021) ===
In August 2019, it was announced that Shamrock would be returning to TNA, now known as Impact Wrestling, for the first time since 2004. He returned at the September 5 Impact! TV taping in Las Vegas, Nevada, and furthered his feud with Moose that began over social media. Shamrock faced Moose at the 2019 Bound for Glory event in a losing effort. On the October 29 episode of Impact!, Shamrock was challenged to a match by Joey Ryan. The following week, Shamrock defeated Ryan, winning his first match since 2002. In February 2020, he was inducted into the Impact Hall of Fame. On March 17, ICU interrupted Shamrock's interview with Josh Mathews. The mysterious figure threw a fireball into Shamrock's eyes. He took off the mask and it was revealed to be Sami Callihan. Callihan would take his phone and the lights would go off and he would disappear. The feud would culminate at Rebellion 2020 Night 1 in an Unsanctioned match, where Shamrock submitted Callihan to an ankle lock. Ken Shamrock turned heel when he aligned himself with Sami Callihan and attacked Eddie Edwards before leaving the promotion once more.

=== Battleground Championship Wrestling (2022) ===
Shamrock returned for a one-night appearance for Battleground Championship Wrestling in Philadelphia on August 6, 2022, defeating Harry Smith (son of Davey Boy Smith).

== Mixed martial arts career ==
=== Background ===
The origins of Shamrock's professional fighting career began while working as a bouncer in college and the early years of his professional wrestling career in North Carolina. He made money by winning Toughman Contests and street fights. Shamrock later joined the shoot-style Japanese pro wrestling organization Fujiwara Gumi. On October 4, 1992, at the Tokyo Dome, a legitimate match between "Wayne Shamrock" (Shamrock's ring name in Japan) and kickboxer Don Nakaya Nielsen took place. Shamrock submitted Nielsen in 45 seconds, first threatening him with a rear naked choke and then locking a neck crank/keylock combination for the win. The success of this match made young professional wrestlers Shamrock, Masakatsu Funaki and Minoru Suzuki question what they had been told since entering into predetermined wrestling: that nobody would ever pay to see real matches. Funaki and Suzuki then founded a group of professional wrestlers and decided to pursue marketable legitimate matches. The two formed the pioneering mixed martial arts (MMA) promotion called Pancrase, which Shamrock later joined.

=== Pancrase Hybrid Wrestling (1993–1996) ===
Shamrock made his mixed martial arts debut at Pancrase on September 21 at their inaugural event Pancrase: Yes, We Are Hybrid Wrestlers 1. Using professional wrestling rules—no closed fisted punching to the head and breaks on the ropes—but fighting for real without predetermined finishes, Shamrock beat Funaki by arm-triangle choke in the main event of the first Pancrase show on September 21, 1993. Shamrock considered this a big victory, as it had been the first time he beat Funaki in all his time as Funaki's apprentice, and the show attracted a sell-out audience of 7,000.

He followed up with victories over Yoshiki Takahashi, Takaku Fuke and Andre Van Den Oetelaar, and was slated to fight co-founder Minoru Suzuki on January 19, 1994. According to Shamrock, he was asked by Pancrase management not to injure Suzuki during the match, as the Japanese was already affected by a back injury. However, during the match Suzuki refused to release a kneebar after Shamrock had grabbed the ropes to escape, which injured the American's leg and forced him to forfeit the fight. The incident angered Shamrock, but there were no consequences.

His ninth match, against Matt Hume, would be a controversial one too. The bout was finished by Shamrock performing a professional wrestling northern lights suplex floated over into a Kimura lock and was widely considered to be a worked shoot. When Shamrock was asked about the matter in 1998, he revealed that Hume and him had agreed to work the match in an exhibition format. Later, in 2015, he would answer to a similar question: "I talked to Matt and I said that we would go in with each other but I wouldn't hurt him. I wouldn't hurt him, because he had been so green. [...] So those were understandings I had with guys because I was so much better than they were. And I'm not going to go in there and abuse these guys."

He defeated world kickboxing champion Maurice Smith and Alex Cook in the opening round of the 16-man King of Pancrase Tournament and Masakatsu Funaki and Manabu Yamada in the Second round to become the first King of Pancrase in December 1994. With this win, Shamrock became the first ever foreign champion in MMA history in Japan. He then defended his King of Pancrase title against Bas Rutten in 1995, submitting him with a kneebar. He lost the title in his next fight against Pancrase co-creator, Minoru Suzuki.

In addition to his MMA bouts in Pancrase, Shamrock also competed in a kickboxing match in 1994 with Dutch champion Frank "The Animal" Lobman, who holds a pro record of 110-6 with a 90% KO ratio. The American had only rudimentary striking experience, but he took the fight expecting it to help him to work on proper kickboxing. Shamrock broke Lobman's nose with a right cross early in the bout but was ultimately defeated by TKO due to leg kicks.

Shamrock eventually had a falling out with Pancrase management in early 1996 and left the company to compete in the UFC full-time. Shamrock left Pancrase with a record of 17–3.

=== Ultimate Fighting Championship (1993–1996) ===
==== Ken Shamrock vs. Royce Gracie - the first UFC rivalry ====
From there he went to the newly formed Ultimate Fighting Championship (UFC), a fighting tournament that would take place in America. Shamrock was billed representing "shootfighting", the term used at the time to describe the style in which he competed in Japan. Although Shamrock initially believed it to be a professional wrestling event, he decided to sign up nonetheless, supported by Pancrase members Masakatsu Funaki and Takaku Fuke. The event, UFC 1, was held under a one-night tournament format, but Shamrock only realized it would be real fighting after watching Gerard Gordeau knock out Teila Tuli in the first bout.

In the first round, Shamrock was pitted against kickboxing stylist Patrick Smith, who he made short work of by throwing Smith to the mat and submitting him with a heel hook. His next opponent was Brazilian jiu-jitsu exponent and eventual tournament winner Royce Gracie. Shamrock sprawled a takedown and manoeuvred on top of Gracie, but the latter escaped from under his mount attempt and returned to his feet. The Brazilian then pulled guard, so the American grabbed his ankle and sat back to attempt another heel hook. According to Shamrock, however, Gracie had wrapped his gi around Shamrock's arm, and when the latter sat back, it pulled Gracie on top of him. With his arm still entangled, the American could not apply his leglock, which Gracie capitalized on to secure a choke with his free hand and submit Shamrock. While the move is often listed as a rear naked choke, Shamrock later stated it to be actually a gi choke, as Royce had wrapped the cloth of his gi around Ken's neck. The ending of the fight was also controversial, as the referee did not see the tap and ordered the two fighters to continue fighting after Gracie had let go of the hold. Shamrock paused for a few seconds but declined, admitting to the ref that he tapped out and that it would not be fair for him to continue fighting.

After the fight, Shamrock admitted that he had underestimated Gracie. In 2008 he said: "I didn't know who Royce Gracie was... When I saw him in his gi, I thought he was some karate guy [with no grappling skills]." On the other hand, in 2015 Shamrock said he had watched the Gracie Jiu-Jitsu: In Action before the event and showed it to Funaki and the rest: "So one thing led to another, they started to support me on it- they did know that that gi meant a lot- but when they saw it too they thought "Yeah, you'll be able to beat this guy pretty well." And I had confidence, too." Shamrock ultimately attributed his loss to the fact that he wasn't allowed to wear wrestling shoes during the fight, whereas Gracie had been allowed to wear his gi and choke Shamrock with it. "[Wearing shoes] is a lot of the set ups and the positions for my leglocks- being able to get my knee inside, being able to spin and push off, and being able to secure the leg. You take the shoes off, it's like being on ice on the mat if you've never done it before."

Shamrock was originally scheduled to compete at UFC 2 but broke his hand after blocking a high kick while sparring with a teammate. He still wanted to compete, but when doctors told him that he might never fight again if he injured his hand any further, he reluctantly withdrew.

On September 9, 1994, Shamrock returned to the octagon at UFC 3 in an event that was marketed by the UFC as the ultimate rematch between two-time champion Royce Gracie and #1 contender Shamrock. Shamrock's first fight, now wearing better shoes, was against top ranked judo practitioner Christophe Leininger. Shamrock's next fight was in the semifinals against kickboxer Felix Mitchell. Shamrock defeated Mitchell with the popularized rear naked choke. With this win, Shamrock advanced to the finals of UFC 3. However, Shamrock refused to compete in the finals after he learned Gracie had dropped out of the tournament after his win over Kimo Leopoldo, combined with a knee injury he suffered during his match with Leininger.

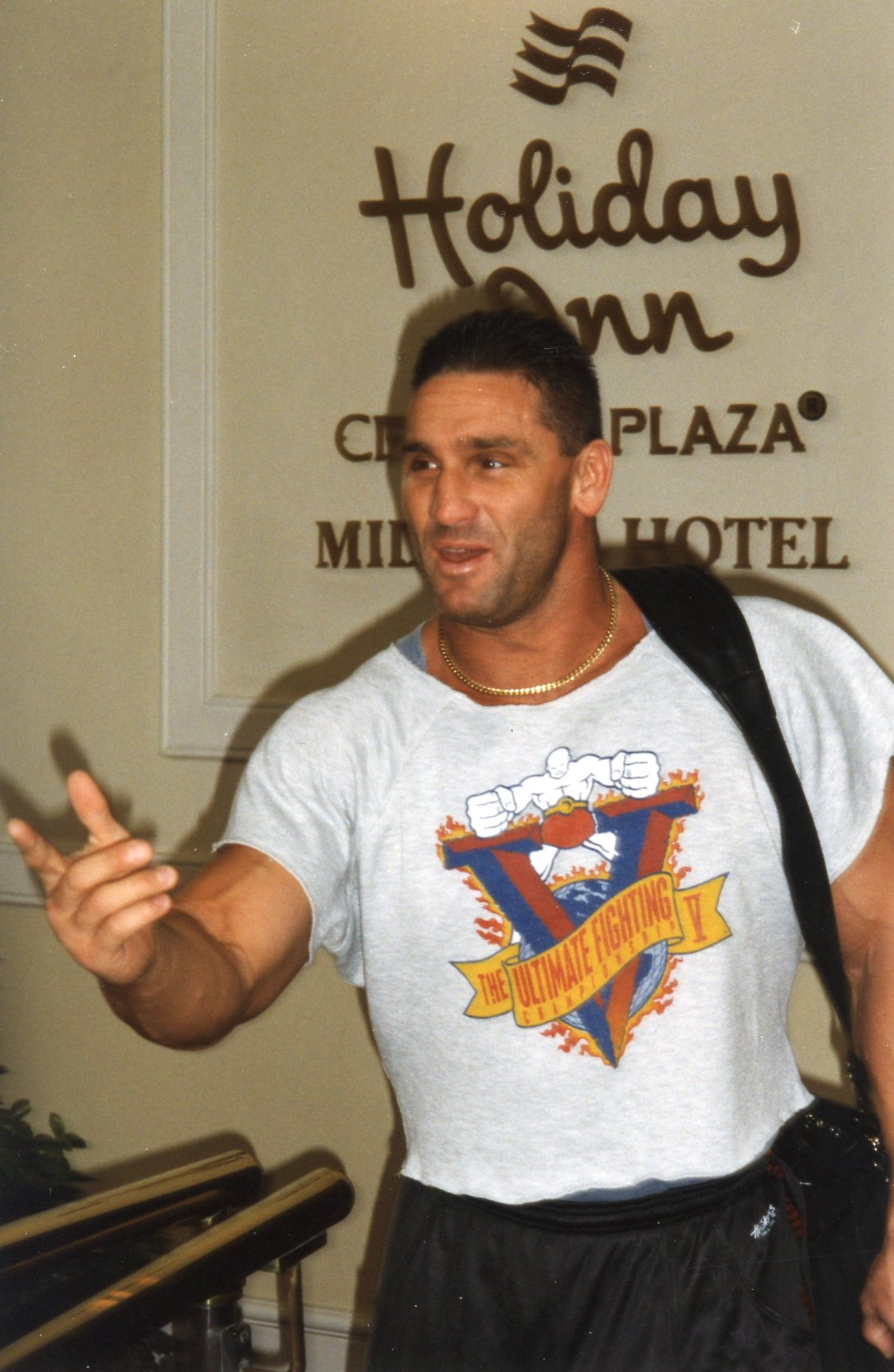
Shamrock in 1998 at a WWF event wearing a T-shirt for the UFC 5 pay-per-view where he fought Royce Gracie for half an hour

On April 5, 1995, at UFC 5, Shamrock got his rematch with Gracie in a match called "The Superfight," which would determine the UFC Champion. At the time, Gracie had a reputation as being seemingly unbeatable. Gracie came into the octagon at 190 pounds, while Shamrock cut his weight down to 205 pounds for the bout. Mere hours before the event, the UFC suddenly instituted a 30-minute time limit, mainly due to pay per view time constraints. Both Gracie and Shamrock were upset at the sudden rule change. Shamrock and Gracie fought for the entire allotted time of 30 minutes along with 5 minutes of overtime before the match was declared a draw. Had there been ringside judges, UFC matchmaker Art Davie believes that Shamrock would have been declared the winner. Gracie left with a melon sized welt closing his eye, a result of a standing punch due to a sudden change of the rules in which both of the fighters were restarted on their feet. Shamrock was not satisfied with his performance against Gracie, saying "it's certainly not a win. You gain nothing (with a draw)". Shamrock expressed desire to fight Gracie again for a third time in 1996, saying that if it went to a draw again, he would have Gracie declared the winner and Shamrock would forfeit his UFC Superfight Championship belt to Gracie.

==== UFC Superfight Champion ====
Shamrock was then matched up with UFC 5 tournament champion Dan Severn at UFC 6 on July 14, 1995, to determine the reigning champion of the UFC. The "superfight", a match presented as a fight between the "best of the best", was still the match that would determine the UFC champion and the tournament winner would be considered the #1 contender for the newly created UFC Superfight Championship (later replaced by the UFC Heavyweight Championship when weight categories were introduced to the UFC). Their feud began at the pre-fight press conference. After most of the attention from the media was given to Shamrock, Severn got up and walked out of the door without explanation. Shamrock took Severn's action as a sign of disrespect. Severn later said that he walked out because he felt that it would be unfair to Shamrock for him to be present in the room while Shamrock was discussing his fight strategy to the media. Shamrock became even more furious when he found a newsletter back at the hotel that explained to readers how Severn was going to destroy Shamrock. During the match, Shamrock forced Severn to tap out to a choke in 2:14 to win the UFC Superfight Championship.

On September 8, 1995, at UFC 7, Shamrock successfully defended the UFC Superfight Championship against UFC 6 Tournament Champion "The Russian Bear" Oleg Taktarov. Shamrock stated in his autobiography that he was uncomfortable fighting Taktarov, as Oleg trained with the Lion's Den and he did not wish to injure his friend and teammate. In Beyond the Lion's Den, Shamrock states; "In addition to being his friend, I was also trying to get him into Pancrase and if I broke his leg it would be a while before he could recover and he needed the money. I figured my best chance of winning without seriously hurting him was to beat on him with punches... If I could open a cut and get him to start pouring blood, I could get a referee stoppage. It might not have been the best plan going into a fight, but considering the options it seemed like the best option available. And it turned out fine. I battered him around for the duration of the match, the bout was declared a draw and when Oleg recovered he went on to fight in Pancrase."

Shamrock then defended his belt against Kimo Leopoldo at UFC 8 in February 1996 in Puerto Rico. In the bout, Shamrock secured a kneebar, forcing Kimo to submit. With the win, Shamrock defended his UFC Superfight title for the second time.

==== The Dance in Detroit ====
Shamrock was then scheduled to face number one contender and rival Dan Severn at UFC 9 in a rematch of their fight at UFC 6, which Shamrock won by guillotine choke in 2:14. Their rematch at UFC 9 was marketed as the "Clash of the Titans 2" and took place in the Cobo Arena in Detroit, Michigan, in Severn's home state.

UFC owner Bob Meyrowitz, referee John McCarthy and a team of lawyers were in court until 4:30 p.m. on the day of the fight battling with the District Attorney of Michigan, who was trying to prevent the UFC from holding the event in the state. An ultimatum was issued: the fight could go on as long as there were no closed fisted strikes to the head and no headbutts. The UFC, desperate to put the show on, agreed to the terms. Fighters were warned hours before the show that they would be arrested if they punched to the head with a closed fist. When Shamrock learned of the sudden rule change, he made up his mind that he was not going to fight. While training for the match, Shamrock suffered a torn lateral meniscus, a partially torn ACL, a broken nose, and cracked ribs. His injuries, combined with the rule change, meant he did not think he could win the fight because all of his weapons were taken away from him. Shamrock was also fearful that he would be arrested; the troubled boys from his father's foster home would be watching him and he was afraid of setting a bad example. If Shamrock withdrew, the main event would have been cancelled and the UFC could have suffered substantial monetary damage. After UFC owner Bob Meyrowitz and other UFC officials pleaded with Shamrock to go on with the show, Shamrock, despite the injuries and new rules, reluctantly gave in to the pressure.

In a fight that would be called "The Dance in Detroit", both Severn and Shamrock circled each other with little to no contact for a combined total of almost thirty minutes. "I took the center of the ring understanding that I was going to be fighting for my life and Dan never came at me," Shamrock said. Severn later said that his strategy was purposely not to engage with Shamrock and wait for the fans to boo, hoping that the booing would affect Shamrock psychologically and force him to make a mistake that Severn could capitalize on. Finally, after over 15 minutes of stalling, Severn shot for a takedown, but was unsuccessful and following a brief scramble, Shamrock put Severn on his back in full mount. Shamrock held the mount for close to five minutes, throwing open fist palm strikes to Severn's head and an occasional closed fist punch to the body. Shamrock felt as though he would have damaged Severn badly and perhaps finished him from this position of full mount had he been allowed to punch Severn in the face with a closed fist. Severn eventually gave his back in an attempt to get out and the risk paid off as Shamrock slid off Severn's back and onto his back in full guard. Severn landed a headbutt to open a cut above Shamrock's eye and followed with elbow strikes and punches from Shamrock's guard. Shamrock eventually got back to his feet and after six more minutes stalling, the fight went to a judges' decision. The judges gave a split decision win to Dan Severn, which upset Shamrock because he felt as though Severn had broken the rules by utilizing the banned closed fist punches to the head and headbutts. Chants of "boring!" and "Let's go Red Wings!" were echoed throughout the arena during the fight. Shamrock later stated that going through with this fight was the biggest regret of his fighting career.

After taking time off away from the octagon to heal injuries, Shamrock entered the UFC's Ultimate Ultimate 1996 in December 1996. Shamrock appeared as a guest on the mainstream American television program Late Night with Conan O'Brien to promote the event. Frank Shamrock served as Ken's head cornerman for the event. Shamrock's opponent in the quarterfinals of the tournament was Judo black belt, kickboxer, and Golden Gloves champion Brian Johnston. Shamrock eventually tapped Johnston out with a forearm choke and advanced to the semifinals of the tournament. Shamrock, however, broke the same hand during this fight that kept him out of UFC 2 and had to withdraw from the tournament. If Ken Shamrock was not injured, he would have faced Tank Abbott in the semifinals and more than likely would have defeated Tank to then go on to the finals of the tournament and face Don Frye. Betting odds had Ken Shamrock as a huge favorite to beat Don Frye in the finals and win the whole one night Ultimate Ultimate 1996 tournament.

After UFC 9, United States Senator John McCain was successful in pulling UFC pay-per-view broadcasts from numerous cable systems, including TCI Cable, which greatly hurt pay-per-view revenue. Combined with money drying out, the need to support his family and being burnt out from fighting, Shamrock left MMA for professional wrestling signing with the World Wrestling Federation.

=== Pride Fighting Championships (2000–2002, 2005) ===
==== Pride Grand Prix 2000 ====
On January 30, 2000, at the Pride Grand Prix 2000 Opening Round, Guy Mezger, one of Shamrock's fighters, fought Kazushi Sakuraba, who at the time was considered to be one of the best pound for pound fighters in the world. Mezger took the fight on two weeks' notice and had a broken foot going into the fight. The contract that Mezger signed stipulated that the fight would be one 15-minute round with no overtime. The fight mostly consisted of Mezger controlling the fight by stopping Sakuraba's takedown attempts while landing strikes from the outside. The round ended and Mezger expected the fight to go to the judges, but Pride officials wanted the fight to go to overtime.

According to Mezger, Pride did not like the outcome of the fight and changed the agreement/contract on the spot in order to give Sakuraba another chance to win the fight. Ken Shamrock, Mezger's corner man, entered the ring and an argument ensued. Mezger was then ordered out of the ring and back to the locker room by Shamrock, who was livid at the decision to extend the fight because of Mezger's foot injury and the fact that he had taken the fight on short notice.

Mezger said, "For some reason, I had a tremendous amount of energy for that 15 minutes, but I started to kind of wilt near the end. Then they called it a draw and I'm like, "What?" Everyone blames Ken for being unprofessional. Really, Ken was protecting his fighter. We had an agreement. Sakuraba said, "I wanted to go another round, thinking it would be possible to salvage the match, but when it was decided to extend the fight, Ken Shamrock was making scary faces. Later I heard that Mezger's contract was only for a one-round fight. I thought, "Ah, then it couldn't be helped." But Shamrock didn't have to get so angry like that. Seeing Mezger getting scolded by him, I felt sorry for (Mezger)."

Later that night, the president of Pride FC made a public apology to Mezger at the Tokyo Dome for the miscommunication. Braverman added, "We had a big meeting (with PRIDE). We were able to get some concessions out of them, money and guarantees of future fights. They wanted to make it right. One thing I said in the meeting was, "Do you want me to call Kenny back in here and see what he says?" "No, no, no, no!"

In early 2000, Shamrock made a comeback to the mixed martial arts scene following his 4-year hiatus in the WWF. Ken Shamrock was supposed to face Josh Barnett at SuperBrawl 16 February 8, 2000, but withdrew due to pay issues, Shamrock was the favorite to win the bout and was replaced by former fellow UFC Superfight Champion Dan Severn, He signed with Pride Fighting Championships and defeated Alexander Otsuka by KO due to punches at the Pride Grand Prix 2000 Finals in the superfight, his first fight back from the WWF. During the match Shamrock was able to totally knock out the tough Otsuka, a feat which renowned strikers like Igor Vovchanchyn and Wanderlei Silva failed to do. This was the first ever Pride event to be broadcast live in America and Pride strategically used Shamrock's drawing power in America by making his Superfight with Otsuka the co-headliner of the event.

==== Heavyweight division ====
On August 27, 2000, Shamrock fought consensus top 10 Heavyweight "Ironhead" Kazuyuki Fujita at Pride 10 - Return of the Warriors. Shamrock came into the fight with Fujita noticeably smaller than his previous fight with Otsuka, dropping roughly 15 pounds of weight. During the time before the fight, Shamrock was going through a divorce and had to take care of his young kids during the day, which severely cut into his training time for the fight. Despite this, Shamrock dominated Fujita throughout the entire fight, stopping takedowns from the Japanese wrestling champion and landing hard strikes, but eventually had his corner throw in the towel because he felt like he was having a heart attack. He was evaluated after the fight and it was determined that he was suffering from heart palpitations.

In March 2001, Shamrock was scheduled to fight Igor Vovchanchyn at Pride 13 - Collision Course, but re-injured his neck during training two weeks before the fight, the same serious neck injury that ended his WWF career.

Shamrock engaged in a feud with Don Frye during his career in the Pride Fighting Championships, whose background was Don Frye's trash talking. In 1999, Alicia Webb (also known as Ryan Shamrock) dated Ken Shamrock until early 2003. Frye made comments to the effect that Shamrock cheated on and divorced his wife to date a young girl (Alicia Webb was 19 and Ken Shamrock was 35 when they started dating). Frye also joked that Ken's (at the time) estranged father Bob and brother Frank would be in Frye's corner for the fight. Ken Shamrock was enraged by Frye's trash talk, causing a feud between Shamrock and Frye. Since then, Frye has stated that he only resorted to personal trash talk to make Ken want to fight him. Frye said: "I saw Ken Shamrock whoop him (Dan Severn) at UFC 6 and I thought, "That's a guy I gotta fight. Anybody who can whoop Dan Severn like that has gotta be a man and I want to test my size against his size. I had the chance to talk trash and they gave me the fight; I crossed the line. I wasn't professional about it, but Ken was and after the fight, we shook hands and went our separate ways."

The feud ended on February 24, 2002, at Pride 19, where Shamrock fought Frye in the main event in a match that potentially had PRIDE Heavyweight Championship title implications (PRIDE FC considered giving the winner of this fight a title shot against Pride heavyweight champion Antônio Rodrigo Nogueira). Frye got the edge on a series of clinch battles, while Shamrock dropped down for an ankle lock and transitioned into both a kneebar and a toehold, wrenching Frye's leg badly; however, despite the damage, Frye refused to tap out and managed to knock Shamrock down in a subsequent punching exchange. The bout moved to the mat, where Shamrock attempted another ankle lock, only for Frye to try to counter with one of his own and finally refusing to tap out by sheer will until the time ran out. Frye won the fight via spit decision, and the two hugged after the fight ended, putting an end to their rivalry.

==== Fight against Kazushi Sakuraba ====
In October 2005, Shamrock lost to Kazushi Sakuraba in Pride: Fully Loaded by TKO. Three minutes into the bout, Sakuraba struck through Shamrock's guard with a left hand. Shamrock staggered back and ultimately fell into the ropes, his head hanging out of the ring and his back turned to Sakuraba. Sakuraba rushed in to follow up, but before any meaningful offense could be launched, the fight was halted by referee Yuji Shimada. Shamrock got up following the KO and protested vigorously. Opinions were mixed regarding the KO's legitimacy, though Ken's adopted brother and rival, Frank, stated to believe the stoppage was justified.

=== Return to the UFC (2002–2006) ===
==== Feud with Tito Ortiz ====
A feud between Shamrock's Lion's Den camp and Tito Ortiz began to build on January 8, 1999, at UFC 18. After upsetting top UFC fighter and Lion's Den member Jerry Bohlander, Ortiz mimicked shooting at Shamrock and put on a shirt in the octagon which read "I just f**ked your ass".

On March 5, 1999, at UFC 19, after Ortiz won by referee stoppage in his rematch with Guy Mezger, he immediately flipped off the Lion's Den corner and then put on a shirt that said "Gay Mezger is my Bitch". After Shamrock saw the shirt, he yelled into the octagon "Hey Tito, don't let me see you wearing that shirt!". Shamrock leaped onto the top of the cage, screaming at Ortiz and angrily waving his finger in Ortiz's face. Referee John McCarthy picked Ortiz up and carried him across the octagon to prevent the situation from escalating further. The situation was escalated to the point that police and security had to be called in to monitor the situation.

On November 22, 2002, at UFC 40, nearly four years after the confrontation at UFC 19, Shamrock returned to the UFC to fight Ortiz in a title match for the UFC Light Heavyweight Championship. Shamrock's apparent size advantage did not factor into the fight, however; Shamrock experienced difficulty cutting weight for the first time and cut too much weight, weighing in at 201 lbs, 4 lbs under the 205 lb. limit. Ortiz shed light upon his feelings before the fight in his book This is Gonna Hurt: The Life of a Mixed Martial Arts Champion; "Ken Shamrock is a real good fighter. I was not intimidated by him, but I guess you can say I was a little bit afraid."

The match garnered mainstream attention from media outlets such as ESPN and USA Today. UFC President Dana White credited Shamrock for the show's success. White said, "the reason we did so well on UFC 40 was because of Ken Shamrock and the fact that everyone knew who he was." Shamrock briefly buckled Ortiz to his knees with a punch, however Ortiz would go on to control most of the bout with his wrestling and ground and pound, causing Shamrock's corner to throw in the towel before the fourth round.

After the fight was over, Shamrock revealed that he fought Ortiz with a torn ACL. He also seriously contemplated retirement from MMA, citing the fact that he had never lost two fights in a row in his career before and he had a buildup of injuries. In 2003, Shamrock had surgery to repair his ACL. Shamrock has said that since his knee injury, he has had difficulty shooting and taking people down, which resulted in Shamrock changing his primary style from a wrestler/grappler and moving more towards a standup fighter.

==== UFC Hall of Famer ====
On November 21, 2003, at UFC 45, Royce Gracie and Shamrock became the first inductees to the UFC Hall of Fame. UFC President Dana White said, "We feel that no two individuals are more deserving than Royce and Ken to be the charter members. Their contributions to our sport, both inside and outside the Octagon, may never be equaled."

At UFC 48 on June 19, 2004, a 40-year-old Shamrock returned to fight the 244 lb (111 kg; 17.4 st) Kimo Leopoldo in a rematch of the UFC 8 Superfight Championship match, which Shamrock had won via submission due to a kneebar. The rematch saw Shamrock once again win, this time by way of KO. Shamrock injured his shoulder during the fight against Kimo. He originally thought it was just "wear and tear", but an MRI revealed a torn rotator cuff. Shamrock then had to have surgery to repair it.

On April 9, 2005, at The Ultimate Fighter finale Shamrock faced Rich Franklin. Shamrock applied a heel hook early in the fight that put Franklin on crutches for a week, but Franklin escaped and defeated Shamrock by a TKO.

==== The Ultimate Fighter: Season 3 ====
On November 19, 2005, at UFC 56, Dana White, the UFC president, announced that Shamrock would be one of the coaches (along with Tito Ortiz) for the upcoming third season of The Ultimate Fighter.

In my opinion, Ken (Shamrock) is the greatest UFC fighter ever. And the scary thing about that is that he's an even better trainer.

— Mikey Burnett, UFC 18 post fight interview, January 8, 1999

Shamrock was portrayed badly on the show, feuding with his fighters and often appearing uninterested. Shamrock admitted to doing a poor job with his fighters: "I failed them miserably, completely. So I have to figure out a way to get this...back in the driver's seat", Shamrock said during the show. Shamrock responded to his critics in an interview: "I trained three fighters that were the first three (UFC) Middleweight Champions: Jerry Bohlander, Guy Mezger and Frank Shamrock. And I've trained dozens of guys to be champs in other organizations. In Pancrase, I had eight fighters in the top ten at one point. I was the champion and (Masakatsu) Funaki was the number one contender. The rest were all Lion's Den fighters. My reputation doesn't have to be spoken for or defended. The UFC and Spike TV did what they thought they needed to do for ratings, but in the end, my fans, my family and my God know exactly who I am."

On July 8, 2006, at UFC 61, the rematch between Shamrock and Ortiz took place. Shamrock lost the rematch with Ortiz in 1:18 of the first round by a technical knockout. During the match, referee Herb Dean deemed that Shamrock was no longer able to intelligently defend himself and stopped the fight. Shamrock and the crowd were furious at the early stoppage and Dana White immediately put together a rematch on television.

At Ortiz vs. Shamrock 3: The Final Chapter on October 10, 2006, Shamrock was defeated again by Ortiz by KO after referee John McCarthy stopped the fight following multiple undefended fist strikes. Immediately after the fight, Ortiz initially celebrated his victory with a mocking "grave digger" routine and a T-shirt that said, "Punishing Him Into Retirement" after giving him the finger. However, Shamrock approached Ortiz and, after the two talked for several seconds, Shamrock said they could put all of their animosity aside as it was always "just business", shaking hands and burying the hatchet. UFC President Dana White said the day after Shamrock's fight with Ortiz, "Last night was a turning point for the UFC. This will further drive the evolution of mixed martial arts into a mainstream sport."

Shamrock was rumored to fight Englishman Steve McDonald at UFC 75, but he was ultimately released from his UFC contract in June 2007. Shamrock stated that the UFC released him solely because of his decision to coach in the International Fight League. Shamrock then engaged in a feud with White in the media and ultimately sued the UFC for breach of contract, citing that he had one fight left on his deal that the UFC had to honor. Shamrock ultimately lost his suit against the UFC and was ordered by the court to pay Zuffa's attorney fees, totaling $175,000.

=== Post-UFC career (2007–2019) ===
==== Various promotions ====
In early 2007, Shamrock became the coach of the Nevada Lions for the International Fight League (IFL). Roy Nelson, one of Shamrock's fighters, was the reigning IFL Heavyweight Champion when the league was bought out and disbanded.

On March 8 at the Cage Rage 25, Shamrock fought Robert Berry, but lost in the first round by Technical knockout due to punches. It was announced on August 25 that Shamrock's next opponent would be Kimbo Slice at Elite XC Saturday Night Fight Special on October 4, 2008. Shamrock, however, was injured before the match and could not compete for at least 45 days.

Ken Shamrock Productions co-promoted an event with War Gods on February 13, 2009, in which Ken fought in the main event against 6'6, 380 lb. Ross Clifton. Shamrock knocked Clifton down with a right hand and finished him via arm bar from side control in the first round. Shamrock was then scheduled to fight Bobby Lashley, but tested positive for steroids after the Clifton fight and received a one-year suspension. Shamrock's attorney and former manager Rod Donohoo said Shamrock adamantly denied the allegations.

Shamrock faced Pedro Rizzo on July 18, 2010, at an event called Impact Fighting Championships in Sydney, Australia. Shamrock lost by TKO due to leg kicks. His next fight was against Johnathan Ivey for the USA MMA promotion on October 16, 2010. Shamrock earned a unanimous decision against Ivey, with all three judges scoring the bout 30-27. He then fought Mike Bourke on November 25, 2010, in Durban, South Africa for the King of the Cage promotion. Shamrock knocked Bourke down with a punch but was injured shortly after during a scramble and subsequently lost the bout via TKO (injury) in the first round, as he was unable to continue due to a leg injury.

Shamrock was scheduled to face Antony Rea at WEF 46 on April 22, 2011. Ken withdrew from the fight with Rea due to a staph infection. Shamrock was also planning on returning to MMA to take on Ian Freeman for 'The Legends World Title' on July 27 at the Keepmoat Stadium in Doncaster, England. The fight with Freeman was cancelled due to contractual issues on Shamrock's part.

On January 8, 2015, Shamrock announced that he would fight James Quinn in the United Kingdom in a Bare Knuckle Boxing match. The match was set for April 2015, but never took place.

==== Bellator MMA ====
On February 27, 2015, during Bellator 134, it was announced that Ken would return to fight Kimbo Slice at Bellator 138 on June 19, 2015. During the fight, Shamrock had managed to take Slice down twice and the second time establish a rear naked choke. Slice refused to tap, however, and eventually wriggled free from the submission and was able catch Shamrock with one of his trademark powerful right hooks resulting in a TKO loss for Shamrock at 2:22 in the first round. The fight was controversial with many believing Ken took a dive.

At Bellator 145, it was announced that Shamrock would face rival Royce Gracie in a trilogy fight on February 19, 2016, at Bellator 149, almost 21 years after their most recent fight. Gracie won the bout via TKO in round one after taking Shamrock down and battering him with hammerfists. Though there was controversy, as replays showed Gracie kneeing Shamrock in the groin before taking him down. On March 11, 2016, it was revealed by Texas Combat Sports commission that Shamrock had failed his pre-fight drug test. His license to fight was revoked.

==== Retirement ====
In March, 2023 Shamrock confirmed he was only retired in MMA, not professional wrestling.

=== Criticism of later career ===
Shamrock has been criticized by some in the MMA media for fighting too far past his prime. Jeremy Botter of Heavy.com wrote: "Ken Shamrock used to be the baddest man on the planet. In the early days of mixed martial arts, it was tough to find anybody who inspired more fear than Shamrock. His muscled and ripped frame...his intensity was unequaled in the sport at the time, and his bag of submissions made him a very real threat to any opponent he faced during those early years. But those early years were a long time ago, and Shamrock is no longer even a shell of the man he once was."

After the Impact FC 2 show, Dave Meltzer wrote: "Impact Fighting Championship's pay-per-view show from Sydney was a sad reminder of what the future may hold for many of today's top stars. Ken Shamrock, Carlos Newton, Murilo Bustamante, Pedro Rizzo and Josh Barnett were all at various points either UFC champions or groomed to be top stars. But there they were, on the other side of the world, fighting before quiet, small crowds in an atmosphere that hardly felt like they were part of a booming sport."

Dana White said in 2008; "Ken Shamrock was in a beef with us over his contract. We thought he retired, he was claiming he didn't and still had one fight. And my attitude was, I'd rather pay Ken Shamrock to not fight. I'd rather pay him to not fight and just say, "stay home, Ken". Ken is way past his prime, it gets to the point where it's dangerous for that guy to still be fighting." WWE announcer Jim Ross said before Shamrock's scheduled fight with Bobby Lashley in early 2009; "There was a time that I could see the veteran, 45-year-old Shamrock, a former WWE superstar, schooling the MMA rookie Lashley but that ship has long since sailed. I have great respect for Ken but he's outstayed his welcome in the octagon, cage, whatever and needs to teach and coach and stop fighting...Kenny is fighting for one more pay day while Lashley is fighting to help establish what he hopes will be a long term, lucrative, MMA career."

In Dan Wetzel's eulogy for Kimbo Slice, he described Slice's opponent Shamrock as a "tomato can" in their scheduled October 2008 fight.

=== Fighting style ===
Shamrock's fighting style has varied over the course of his career. During Shamrock's prime, he was known as an explosive grappler with speed, power, agility, and physical strength. Fighter Mike Ciesnolevicz called Shamrock "out of this world strong", and added "I was in awe of his strength, it was definitely something I will not forget." Bob Shamrock, who ran a troubled boys youth home and eventually adopted Ken as his son, said, "I have had over 900 young men live with me in the past 30 years and I have never seen anyone with (Ken's) athletic ability." Shamrock learned the art of shoot wrestling primarily from Masakatsu Funaki in Japan and used this style during his fights in the 1990s.

In 2000, after Shamrock's three-year absence from MMA while he was participating in professional wrestling with the WWF, Shamrock returned to MMA showcasing a vastly different style of fighting. Shamrock sustained a large amount of injuries during his WWF career, including a serious neck injury and several knee injuries. Shamrock has stated that his knee injuries caused him difficulty in shooting and taking people down, which caused him to shift his style towards striking and abandon his grappling pedigree.

== Promoting career ==
=== Valor Bare Knuckle (2019–present) ===
In July 2019, Shamrock announced he would begin his own bare-knuckle boxing promotion called Valor. The inaugural bare-knuckle event was held in New Town, North Dakota, on September 21, 2019, featuring several UFC veterans.

== Personal life ==
Shamrock is of Irish descent. Shamrock and his adopted brother Frank Shamrock had an estranged relationship. Ken has claimed that Frank mistreated their foster father Bob, while Frank claims that the reason for the fallout with Ken is due to his feeling that Ken was trying to keep Frank's career from progressing. Frank asserts that he and Ken have never been close and that his attempts to mend their relationship were rejected by Ken. However, as noted in Frank's 2013 Spike TV documentary, "Bound by Blood," Ken and Frank have reconciled. On January 14, 2010, Frank and Ken Shamrock's adoptive father, Bob Shamrock, died due to health complications from diabetes.

Shamrock has been married twice. His first marriage to Tina Ramirez ended in divorce in early 2004. Together they have four children: Ryan Robert, Connor Kenneth, Sean Garret and one daughter, Fallon Marie. In 2005, Shamrock married a woman named Tonya whom he had known since childhood. He is now the stepfather to her three children. In total, Shamrock has seven children and seventeen grandchildren.

In August 2012, Shamrock was investigated for assault at a mall in Modesto, California. According to a report, Shamrock intervened when he saw two people involved in a fight, and when he went to break it up, a female jumped on Shamrock's back and attempted to choke him. Shamrock threw her to the ground, with the force of the impact when she landed knocking her unconscious. Shamrock said he mistook her for a male, and would not have reacted so aggressively had he realized she was a woman. No charges were filed as the Modesto police determined Shamrock acted in self defense.

== Other media ==
Shamrock had appeared in numerous video games: WCW vs. the World, WWF War Zone, WWF Attitude, WWF WrestleMania 2000, WWF SmackDown!, WWF SmackDown! 2: Know Your Role (Hidden character), WWF No Mercy, UFC: Tapout 2, UFC: Sudden Impact, EA Sports MMA, WWE '13, WWE 2K16, WWE 2K24 and WWE 2K25.

Shamrock was later the star of a low-budget martial arts film in 1997 called Champions alongside Danny Trejo.

Shamrock released his book, Inside The Lion's Den, on March 15, 1998.

In 1999, Shamrock appeared in an episode of Walker, Texas Ranger as a prisoner who was involved in an illegal fighting ring staged by the prison guards and warden.

Shamrock also appeared in episode 15 of the first season of That '70s Show as a professional wrestler, alongside fellow WWE wrestler Dwayne “The Rock” Johnson.

As part of the UFC, he appeared as a cage fighter in the 1995 movie Virtuosity, starring Denzel Washington and Russell Crowe.

== Championships and accomplishments ==
=== Mixed martial arts ===
- George Tragos/Lou Thesz Professional Wrestling Hall of Fame
  - George Tragos Award (2020)
- Martial Arts History Museum Hall of Fame
  - Class of 2012
- Ultimate Fighting Championship
  - UFC Hall of Fame (Inaugural inductee, Pioneer wing, class of 2003)
  - UFC Superfight Championship (one time, inaugural)
    - Two successful title defenses
  - UFC 3 Tournament Finalist (Note: Withdrew each time due to injury.)
  - UFC 1 Tournament Semifinalist
  - Ultimate Ultimate 1996 Semifinalist
  - UFC Encyclopedia Awards
    - Fight of the Night (Two times) vs. Royce Gracie 1 and Tito Ortiz 1
    - Submission of the Night (One time) vs. Dan Severn 1
  - Longest fight in UFC history (36 minutes) - with Royce Gracie at UFC 5
  - UFC Viewer's Choice Award
- Pancrase Hybrid Wrestling
  - King of Pancrase Tournament winner (1994)
    - First ever champion of Pancrase
  - King of Pancrase
    - One successful title defense
- Pride Fighting Championships
  - Pride Grand Prix 2000 Finals Superfight Winner
- World Mixed Martial Arts Association
  - WMMAA Heavyweight Championship (1 time)
- Fight Matrix
  - 1994 Fighter of the Year
  - 1995 Fighter of the Year
- Black Belt Magazine
  - 2000 Full-Contact Fighter of the Year
- Wrestling Observer Newsletter
  - 2002 Feud of the Year vs. Tito Ortiz
  - 2006 Feud of the Year vs. Tito Ortiz
- World MMA Awards
  - 2023 Lifetime Achievement Award

=== Professional wrestling ===
- Battle Championship Wrestling
  - BCW Tag Team Championship (1 time) – with Carlo Cannon
- NWA: Total Nonstop Action/Impact Wrestling
  - NWA World Heavyweight Championship (1 time)
  - Gauntlet for the Gold (2002 – Heavyweight)
  - Impact Hall of Fame (2020)
- Pro Wrestling Illustrated
  - Most Improved Wrestler of the Year (1997)
  - Ranked No. 8 of the top 500 singles wrestlers in the PWI 500 in 1998
  - Ranked No. 226 of the top 500 singles wrestlers of the "PWI Years" in 2003
- South Atlantic Pro Wrestling
  - SAPW Heavyweight Championship (1 time)
  - SAPW Heavyweight Title Tournament (1991)
- World Wrestling Federation/Entertainment
  - WWF Intercontinental Championship (1 time)
  - WWF Tag Team Championship (1 time) – with Big Boss Man
  - King of the Ring (1998)
  - WWF Intercontinental Championship Tournament (1998)
  - WWE Hall of Fame (2025) – Immortal Moment – Refereeing Bret Hart vs. Stone Cold Steve Austin's no disqualification submission match at WrestleMania 13

== Mixed martial arts record ==
Professional record breakdown
| 47 matches | 28 wins | 17 losses |
| By knockout | 3 | 11 |
| By submission | 22 | 4 |
| By decision | 3 | 2 |
| Draws | 2 | |

| Res. | Record | Opponent | Method | Event | Date | Round | Time | Location | Notes |
|---|---|---|---|---|---|---|---|---|---|
| Loss | 28–17–2 | Royce Gracie | TKO (knee and punches) | Bellator 149 | February 19, 2016 | 1 | 2:22 | Houston, Texas, United States | Return to Light Heavyweight. |
| Loss | 28–16–2 | Kimbo Slice | TKO (punches) | Bellator 138 | June 19, 2015 | 1 | 2:22 | St. Louis, Missouri, United States | |
| Loss | 28–15–2 | Mike Bourke | TKO (punches) | KOTC: Platinum | November 25, 2010 | 1 | 2:00 | Durban, South Africa | |
| Win | 28–14–2 | Johnathan Ivey | Decision (unanimous) | USA MMA: Return of the Champions | October 16, 2010 | 3 | 5:00 | Lafayette, Louisiana, United States | |
| Loss | 27–14–2 | Pedro Rizzo | TKO (leg kicks and punches) | Impact FC 2 | July 18, 2010 | 1 | 3:33 | Sydney, Australia | |
| Win | 27–13–2 | Ross Clifton | Submission (armbar) | WarGods: Valentine's Eve Massacre | February 13, 2009 | 1 | 1:00 | Fresno, California, United States | Shamrock tested positive for steroids after fight. |
| Loss | 26–13–2 | Robert Berry | KO (punches) | Cage Rage 25 | March 8, 2008 | 1 | 3:26 | London, England | Return to Heavyweight. |
| Loss | 26–12–2 | Tito Ortiz | TKO (punches) | UFC: Ortiz vs. Shamrock 3: The Final Chapter | October 10, 2006 | 1 | 2:23 | Hollywood, Florida, United States | |
| Loss | 26–11–2 | Tito Ortiz | TKO (elbows) | UFC 61: Bitter Rivals | July 8, 2006 | 1 | 1:18 | Las Vegas, Nevada, United States | TUF 3 coaches fight. |
| Loss | 26–10–2 | Kazushi Sakuraba | TKO (punches) | Pride 30: Fully Loaded | October 23, 2005 | 1 | 2:27 | Saitama, Japan | |
| Loss | 26–9–2 | Rich Franklin | TKO (punches) | The Ultimate Fighter: Team Couture vs. Team Liddell Finale | April 9, 2005 | 1 | 2:42 | Las Vegas, Nevada, United States | Return to Light Heavyweight. |
| Win | 26–8–2 | Kimo Leopoldo | KO (knee) | UFC 48 | June 19, 2004 | 1 | 1:26 | Las Vegas, Nevada, United States | Heavyweight bout. |
| Loss | 25–8–2 | Tito Ortiz | TKO (corner stoppage) | UFC 40 | November 22, 2002 | 3 | 5:00 | Las Vegas, Nevada, United States | Light Heavyweight debut. For the UFC Light Heavyweight Championship. |
| Loss | 25–7–2 | Don Frye | Decision (split) | Pride 19 | February 24, 2002 | 3 | 5:00 | Saitama, Japan | |
| Win | 25–6–2 | Sam Adkins | Submission (kimura) | WMMAA 1: Megafights | August 10, 2001 | 1 | 1:26 | Atlantic City, New Jersey, United States | Won the WMMAA Heavyweight Championship. |
| Loss | 24–6–2 | Kazuyuki Fujita | TKO (corner stoppage) | Pride 10 - Return of the Warriors | August 27, 2000 | 1 | 6:46 | Saitama, Japan | |
| Win | 24–5–2 | Alexander Otsuka | KO (punches) | Pride Grand Prix 2000 Finals | May 1, 2000 | 1 | 9:43 | Tokyo, Japan | Pride Grand Prix 2000 Finals Superfight |
| Win | 23–5–2 | Brian Johnston | Submission (forearm choke) | Ultimate Ultimate 1996 | December 7, 1996 | 1 | 5:48 | Birmingham, Alabama, United States | |
| Loss | 22–5–2 | Dan Severn | Decision (split) | UFC 9 | May 17, 1996 | 1 | 30:00 | Detroit, Michigan, United States | Lost the UFC Superfight Championship. |
| Win | 22–4–2 | Kimo Leopoldo | Submission (kneebar) | UFC 8 | February 16, 1996 | 1 | 4:24 | Bayamón, Puerto Rico | Defended the UFC Superfight Championship. |
| Win | 21–4–2 | Kazuo Takahashi | Decision (lost points) | Pancrase: Truth 1 | January 28, 1996 | 1 | 20:00 | Yokohama, Japan | |
| Win | 20–4–2 | Katsuomi Inagaki | Submission (arm-triangle choke) | Pancrase: Eyes of Beast 7 | December 14, 1995 | 1 | 3:19 | Sapporo, Japan | |
| Draw | 19–4–2 | Oleg Taktarov | Draw (time limit) | UFC 7 | September 8, 1995 | 1 | 33:00 | Buffalo, New York, United States | Retained the UFC Superfight Championship. Match was declared a draw due to the lack of judges. |
| Win | 19–4–1 | Larry Papadopoulos | Submission (achilles lock) | Pancrase: 1995 Neo-Blood Tournament Opening Round | July 22, 1995 | 1 | 2:18 | Tokyo, Japan | |
| Win | 18–4–1 | Dan Severn | Submission (guillotine choke) | UFC 6 | July 14, 1995 | 1 | 2:14 | Casper, Wyoming, United States | Won the inaugural UFC Superfight Championship. |
| Loss | 17–4–1 | Minoru Suzuki | Submission (kneebar) | Pancrase: Eyes of Beast 4 | June 13, 1995 | 1 | 2:14 | Urayasu, Japan | Lost the Pancrase Openweight Championship. |
| Draw | 17–3–1 | Royce Gracie | Draw (time limit) | UFC 5 | April 7, 1995 | 1 | 36:00 | Charlotte, North Carolina, United States | For the inaugural UFC Superfight Championship. Match was declared a draw due to the lack of judges. |
| Win | 17–3 | Bas Rutten | Submission (kneebar) | Pancrase: Eyes of Beast 2 | March 10, 1995 | 1 | 1:01 | Yokohama, Japan | Defended the Pancrase Openweight Championship. |
| Win | 16–3 | Leon Dijk | Submission (inverted heel hook) | Pancrase: Eyes of Beast 1 | January 26, 1995 | 1 | 4:45 | Nagoya, Japan | |
| Win | 15–3 | Manabu Yamada | Decision (unanimous) | Pancrase: King of Pancrase Tournament Second Round | December 17, 1994 | 1 | 30:00 | Tokyo, Japan | Won the King of Pancrase Tournament and the inaugural Pancrase Openweight Championship. |
| Win | 14–3 | Masakatsu Funaki | Submission (arm-triangle choke) | Pancrase: King of Pancrase Tournament Second Round | December 17, 1994 | 1 | 5:50 | Tokyo, Japan | King of Pancrase Tournament Semifinal. |
| Win | 13–3 | Maurice Smith | Submission (arm-triangle choke) | Pancrase: King of Pancrase Tournament Opening Round | December 16, 1994 | 1 | 4:23 | Tokyo, Japan | King of Pancrase Tournament Quarterfinal. |
| Win | 12–3 | Alex Cook | Submission (heel hook) | Pancrase: King of Pancrase Tournament Opening Round | December 16, 1994 | 1 | 1:31 | Tokyo, Japan | King of Pancrase Tournament Opening Round. |
| Win | 11–3 | Takaku Fuke | Submission (rear-naked choke) | Pancrase: Road to the Championship 5 | October 15, 1994 | 1 | 3:13 | Tokyo, Japan | |
| Win | 10–3 | Felix Mitchell | Submission (rear-naked choke) | UFC 3 | September 9, 1994 | 1 | 4:34 | Charlotte, North Carolina, United States | UFC 3 Tournament Semifinal. Later elected to withdraw from tournament following Royce Gracie's withdrawal. |
| Win | 9–3 | Christophe Leininger | TKO (submission to punches) | UFC 3 | September 9, 1994 | 1 | 4:49 | Charlotte, North Carolina, United States | UFC 3 Tournament Quarterfinal. |
| Loss | 8–3 | Masakatsu Funaki | Submission (rear-naked choke) | Pancrase: Road to the Championship 4 | September 1, 1994 | 1 | 2:30 | Osaka, Japan | |
| Win | 8–2 | Bas Rutten | Submission (rear-naked choke) | Pancrase: Road to the Championship 3 | July 26, 1994 | 1 | 16:42 | Tokyo, Japan | |
| Win | 7–2 | Matt Hume | Submission (kimura) | Pancrase: Road to the Championship 2 | July 6, 1994 | 1 | 5:50 | Amagasaki, Japan | |
| Win | 6–2 | Ryushi Yanagisawa | Submission (inverted heel hook) | Pancrase: Pancrash! 3 | April 21, 1994 | 1 | 7:30 | Osaka, Japan | |
| Loss | 5–2 | Minoru Suzuki | Submission (kneebar) | Pancrase: Pancrash! 1 | January 19, 1994 | 1 | 7:37 | Yokohama, Japan | |
| Win | 5–1 | Andre Van Den Oetelaar | Submission (achilles lock) | Pancrase: Yes, We Are Hybrid Wrestlers 4 | December 8, 1993 | 1 | 1:04 | Hakata-ku, Fukuoka, Japan | |
| Loss | 4–1 | Royce Gracie | Submission (rear-naked choke) | UFC 1 | November 12, 1993 | 1 | 0:57 | Denver, Colorado, United States | UFC 1 Tournament Semifinal. |
| Win | 4–0 | Patrick Smith | Submission (heel hook) | UFC 1 | November 12, 1993 | 1 | 1:49 | Denver, Colorado, United States | UFC 1 Tournament Quarterfinal. |
| Win | 3–0 | Takaku Fuke | Technical Submission (rear-naked choke) | Pancrase: Yes, We Are Hybrid Wrestlers 3 | November 8, 1993 | 1 | 0:44 | Kobe, Japan | |
| Win | 2–0 | Yoshiki Takahashi | Submission (heel hook) | Pancrase: Yes, We Are Hybrid Wrestlers 2 | October 14, 1993 | 1 | 12:23 | Nagoya, Japan | |
| Win | 1–0 | Masakatsu Funaki | Submission (arm-triangle choke) | Pancrase: Yes, We Are Hybrid Wrestlers 1 | September 21, 1993 | 1 | 6:15 | Urayasu, Japan | |

=== Mixed rules ===
Professional record breakdown
| 1 match | 1 win | 0 losses |
| By knockout | 0 | 0 |
| By submission | 1 | 0 |
| By decision | 0 | 0 |

| Res. | Record | Opponent | Method | Event | Date | Round | Time | Location | Notes |
|---|---|---|---|---|---|---|---|---|---|
| Win | 1–0 | Don Nakaya Nielsen | Submission (americana) | PWFG Stack of Arms | October 4, 1992 | 1 | 0:44 | Tokyo, Japan | |

== Kickboxing record ==
Kickboxing record
0 wins, 1 loss
| Result | Record | Opponent | Method | Event | Date | Round | Time | Location | Notes |
|---|---|---|---|---|---|---|---|---|---|
| Loss | 0-1 | Frank Lobman | KO (right low kick) | Pancrase: Road to the Championship 1 | May 31, 1994 | 2 | N/A | Tokyo, Japan | |
Legend Win Loss Draw/No contest

== See also ==
- List of Bellator MMA alumni
- List of multi-sport athletes
- List of professional wrestlers by MMA record

== Notes ==
Achievements
| New championship | 1st WMMAA Heavyweight Champion; August 11, 2001 | Succeeded by none |
| New championship | 1st UFC Superfight Champion; July 14, 1995 – May 17, 1996 | Succeeded by Dan Severn |
| New championship | 1st King of Pancrase; December 17, 1994 – May 13, 1995 | Succeeded by Minoru Suzuki |
| New championship | 1st King of Pancrase Tournament winner December 17, 1994 | Succeeded by none |
