= Christophe Leininger =

American Olympic martial artist

Christophe Leninger
- Born: October 12, 1959 (age 67); Scottsdale, Arizona, United States
- Height: 6 ft 0 in (1.83 m)
- Weight: 189 lb (86 kg; 13.5 st)
- Fighting out of: Scottsdale, Arizona
- Rank: 4th Dan Black Belt in Judo
- Years active: 1994–2001 (MMA)

Mixed martial arts record
- Total: 7
- Wins: 3
- By submission: 3
- Losses: 4
- By knockout: 1
- By decision: 3

Other information
- Mixed martial arts record from Sherdog

Christophe Leininger (born October 12, 1959), is an American former judoka who was 1984, 1988, and 1992 US Olympic Judo Team Alternate. He was born in 1959. His brother Bryan Leininger was also a judo competitor. While his father Maurice was a French Judo champion. He is a two time US National Judo Champion and a two time US Judo open champion. He competed in a number of mixed martial arts fights included in Ultimate Fighting Championship.

== Career ==
=== Ultimate Fighting Championship ===
Leininger made his debut in Ultimate Fighting Championship's UFC 3 event, being billed as the second ranked American judoka in his weight class at the time. Going against shoot wrestler Ken Shamrock, Leininger started by trying a morote gari, but Shamrock protected against it and ended up in Christophe's guard. The judoka then tried an armbar, only for Shamrock to turn him over and stack him against the fence, raining punches and headbutts on him for the tap out. Shamrock crossfaced Leininger so hard into the mat that Leininger admitted to being knocked out for a second, and he later was revealed to have suffered a mild concussion.

He returned at UFC 13 against Ken Shamrock's teammate Guy Mezger. Leininger tried to take the fight to the ground, at one point scoring a tomoe nage and transitioning it into a mount position, but Mezger was able to return to his feet every time. After a restart, Mezger hit a clearly tired Leininger with kicks to the legs and head, but the affair was inconclusive and the match went to overtime. There Mezger continued punishing Leininger with strikes, finally earning a decision win.

== Mixed martial arts record ==
Professional record breakdown
7 matches	3 wins	4 losses
By knockout	0	1
By submission	3	0
By decision	0	3

Res.	Record	Opponent	Method	Event	Date	Round	Time	Location	Notes
Loss	3–4	Edwin Dewees	Decision (Unanimous)	RITC 26: Rage in the Cage 26	March 24, 2001	3	3:00	Phoenix, Arizona, United States	
Loss	3–3	Allan Sullivan	Decision	RITC 24: Rage in the Cage 24	January 7, 2001	3	3:00	Phoenix, Arizona, United States	
Loss	3–2	Guy Mezger	Decision (unanimous)	UFC 13	May 30, 1997	1	15:00	Augusta, Georgia, United States	
Win	2–1	Marc Zee	Submission (armbar)	FCSB: Best in the Southwest Championships	January 15, 1997	1	4:55	United States	
Win	1–1	Kelly English	Submission (armbar)	FCSB: Best in the Southwest Championships	January 15, 1997	2	1:16	Charlotte, North Carolina, United States	
Win	3–1	Carlos Garcia	Submission (choke)	FCSB: Best in the Southwest Championships	January 15, 1997	1	6:00	United States	
Loss	0–1	Ken Shamrock	TKO (submission to punches)	UFC 3	September 9, 1994	1	4:49	Charlotte, North Carolina, United States	
