= Greenwood Civic Center =

Multi-purpose arena in Greenwood, South Carolina

- Interactive map of Greenwood Civic Center
- Address: 1610 SC-72
- Location: Greenwood, South Carolina
- Coordinates: 34°12′42.55″N 82°8′9.79″W
- Owner: Greenwood County
- Type: Arena
- Capacity: 4,800

Construction
- Opened: November 17, 1977
- Closed: 2009

Greenwood Civic Center was a 4,800-seat multi-purpose arena in Greenwood, South Carolina. It hosted various local concerts and sporting events for the area. It was designed by architect Dale Gilliland, AIA. Greenwood County Council voted to close the Civic Center in December 2009 and the building has been unoccupied since. The Civic Center fell into disrepair and in the summer of 2015 was torn down.
