= Matt Riddle =

American professional wrestler and mixed martial arts fighter

- Riddle in 2016
- Born: Matthew Frederick Riddle; January 14, 1986 (age 40); Allentown, Pennsylvania, U.S.
- Spouse: Lisa Rennie (m. 2011; div. 2022)
- Partner: Misha Montana (2022–present)
- Children: 4
- Professional wrestling career
- Ring name(s): Matt Riddle; Matthew Riddle; Riddle
- Billed height: 6 ft 2 in (1.88 m)
- Billed weight: 216 lb (98 kg)
- Billed from: Las Vegas, Nevada
- Trained by: Danny Cage; Monster Factory; WWE Performance Center
- Debut: February 7, 2015
- Martial arts career
- Other names: Chipper; Deep Waters
- Height: 6 ft 1 in (185 cm)
- Weight: 170 lb (77 kg; 12 st 2 lb)
- Division: Middleweight (2008, 2014); Welterweight (2009–2013)
- Reach: 76 in (190 cm)
- Stance: Southpaw
- Fighting out of: Del Rio, Texas; Las Vegas, Nevada
- Team: Throwdown Training Center
- Rank: Black belt in Brazilian jiu-jitsu
- Wrestling: NCAA Division II wrestling
- Years active: 2008–2014

Mixed martial arts record
- Total: 13
- Wins: 8
- By knockout: 1
- By submission: 1
- By decision: 5
- By disqualification: 1
- Losses: 3
- By knockout: 1
- By decision: 2
- No contests: 2

Other information
- Mixed martial arts record from Sherdog

Matthew Frederick Riddle (born January 14, 1986) is an American professional wrestler and former mixed martial artist. He is signed to Major League Wrestling (MLW), where he is the current MLW National Openweight Champion in his first reign. He also makes appearances on the independent circuit. He is best known for his tenure in WWE.

As a professional mixed martial artist from 2008 to 2014, Riddle made a name for himself by appearing on SpikeTV's The Ultimate Fighter 7 and went on to hold a four-fight winning streak in the Ultimate Fighting Championship (UFC) before being released upon testing positive for marijuana in February 2013 (that being his second drug test failure). He also fought for Titan FC and compiled a career record of 8–3 (2).

In 2014, Riddle began training at the Monster Factory for a career in professional wrestling and made his debut in February 2015. Readers of the Wrestling Observer Newsletter recognized him as the Rookie of the Year and Most Improved wrestler of the year in 2016. Between 2015 and 2018, he worked on the independent circuit, wrestling for promotions such as Pro Wrestling Guerrilla, World Wrestling Network/Evolve, and others. He is a former Evolve Champion, WWN Champion, PWG World Tag Team Champion (with Jeff Cobb), and two-time Progress Atlas Champion.

Riddle signed with WWE in July 2018 and portrayed a stereotypical carefree, barefoot surfer valley boy. He was assigned to the NXT brand, where he was a one-time NXT Tag Team Champion with Pete Dunne as "The BroserWeights". He was promoted to the main roster in May 2020, where he won the United States Championship in February 2021. In April, Riddle began teaming with Randy Orton as RK-Bro, holding the Raw Tag Team Championship twice. After Orton incurred a back injury in May 2022, which eventually led to RK-Bro's disbandment, Riddle continued his run as a singles competitor until he was released from WWE in September 2023.

== Early life and education ==
Matthew Frederick Riddle was born on January 14, 1986, in Allentown, Pennsylvania. He later moved to Saratoga Springs, New York, where he attended Saratoga Springs High School and was a New York state wrestling champion in 2004. Riddle would face and beat future UFC champion Jon Jones twice in high school wrestling.

Riddle later attended East Stroudsburg University of Pennsylvania on an athletic scholarship, where he was a member of its wrestling team for two years and won many championships. After his head coach was fired, Riddle lost his wrestling scholarship and began his transition into mixed martial arts.

== Mixed martial arts career ==
=== Early career ===
==== The Ultimate Fighter ====
Riddle holds a perfect amateur record of 1–0. During this career, he worked as a roofer and trained in Brazilian jiu-jitsu in the evenings. Riddle credits B.J. Penn's book, Mixed Martial Arts: The Book of Knowledge, in helping him learn during his early years in MMA.

Riddle then fought Dan Simmler, an understudy of Matt Serra, to get into The Ultimate Fighter (TUF) house. Riddle knocked out Simmler in the opening seconds of the second round and struck him three times in the jaw after losing consciousness, breaking Simmler's jaw into two places. Riddle was picked second overall for Team Rampage. During his involvement on show, Riddle was given the nickname Chipper after Rampage noticed him always smiling.

Riddle's second match was against Tim Credeur. Credeur defeated Riddle in the second round, causing him to be knocked out of the tournament. After the fight, Credeur bought Riddle an Xbox 360 with his earnings.

=== Ultimate Fighting Championship (2008–2013) ===
At The Ultimate Fighter 7 Finale, which was held on June 21, 2008, Riddle made his UFC and professional debut defeating fellow Ultimate Fighter castmate, Dante Rivera, via unanimous decision (29–28, 30–27, 30–27). During The Ultimate Fighter 7, Riddle was shown arguing with the older and more experienced Rivera multiple times. Dante, on more than one occasion, stated that he would retire if Riddle defeated him - a commitment which he didn't follow through with after his loss.

Riddle was then scheduled to fight Ryan Thomas at UFC 91, but a knee injury forced Riddle out of the fight and got pinned. The knee injury's recovery was scheduled to take about 6–8 weeks.

After his recovery, Riddle fought and defeated Steve Bruno in a unanimous decision (29–28, 29–28, 29–28) at UFC Fight Night: Lauzon vs. Stephens.

In his third bout, Riddle defeated another one of his former Ultimate Fighter 7 castmates, Dan Cramer, via a unanimous decision on the undercard of UFC 101.

He next faced The Ultimate Fighter 9 alumni Nick Osipczak on November 14, 2009, at UFC 105. The fight was held in Osipczak's home country of England. Riddle lost the fight by TKO in the third round.

After his loss to Osipczak, Riddle faced newcomer Greg Soto on March 27, 2010, at UFC 111. After a dominant first two rounds for Riddle, Soto landed an illegal upkick to Riddle's head in the third round which rendered him unable to continue, giving Riddle the victory by disqualification.

Following this victory, Riddle faced another TUF alumni in DaMarques Johnson on August 1, 2010, at UFC on Versus 2. The fight was a catchweight bout after Johnson weighed in at 172 lbs and Riddle would go on to win the fight via TKO due to punches near the end of the second round.

Riddle was expected to face TJ Waldburger on December 11, 2010, at UFC 124. However, Waldburger was forced from the card with an injury and replaced by newcomer Sean Pierson. Pierson defeated Riddle via unanimous decision (30–27, 30–27, 30–27) and the bout was dubbed by president Dana White as the real Fight of the Night.

Riddle was expected to face Ultimate Fighter castmate, Matt Brown, on March 3, 2011, at UFC Live: Sanchez vs. Kampmann, replacing an injured Mark Scanlon. However, Riddle was also injured, resulting in the Brown fight being removed from the card altogether.

Riddle was expected to face T. J. Grant on June 26, 2011, at UFC on Versus 4. However, Riddle was forced from the bout with an injury and replaced by Charlie Brenneman.

Riddle faced undefeated welterweight prospect Lance Benoist who had made his Octagon debut on September 17, 2011, at UFC Fight Night: Shields vs. Ellenberger. He lost the fight via unanimous decision in a bout that had earned Fight of the Night honors.

Riddle was expected to fight Luis Ramos on December 30, 2011, at UFC 141. However, the fight was called off as Riddle became ill and had to only pull out moments before the fight took place.

Riddle was expected to face Jorge Lopez on February 4, 2012, at UFC 143, replacing an injured Amir Sadollah. However, Lopez was also forced out of the bout and replaced by newcomer Henry Martinez. Riddle won the fight via a split decision.

The bout between Riddle and Ramos was rescheduled for June 22, 2012, at UFC on FX 4. However, Riddle was forced from the bout with another injury, and was replaced by Matt Brown.

Riddle stepped in for Siyar Bahadurzada on short notice to fight Chris Clements at UFC 149. Riddle won the match after catching Clements in a standing arm-triangle choke, forcing him to submit at 2:02 in the third round. Riddle won a $65,000 Submission of the Night bonus. This also marked the first submission win of his professional career. On October 20, 2012, it was announced that Riddle had failed his post-fight drug test, testing positive for marijuana. Riddle was subsequently fined and suspended for 90 days, retroactive to July 21, 2012. His win over Clements was changed to a no contest.

Riddle was originally expected to face Besam Yousef on November 17, 2012, at UFC 154, replacing an injured Stephen Thompson. However, Yousef was forced out with an injury and replaced by John Maguire. Riddle defeated Maguire via a unanimous decision.

Riddle faced Che Mills on February 16, 2013, at UFC on Fuel TV: Barão vs. McDonald. Riddle defeated Mills via split decision. On February 26, 2013, Riddle revealed that he had tested positive for marijuana. This was his second failed drug test within a year, and Riddle was subsequently released from the promotion. He had finished his UFC career ranked 3rd in UFC history for takedown defense (89.3%) and 8th for the total of strikes that have been landed (1350), and without positive marijuana tests would have held an octagon record of 10–3 with a streak of five consecutive victories.

=== Bellator MMA (2013) ===
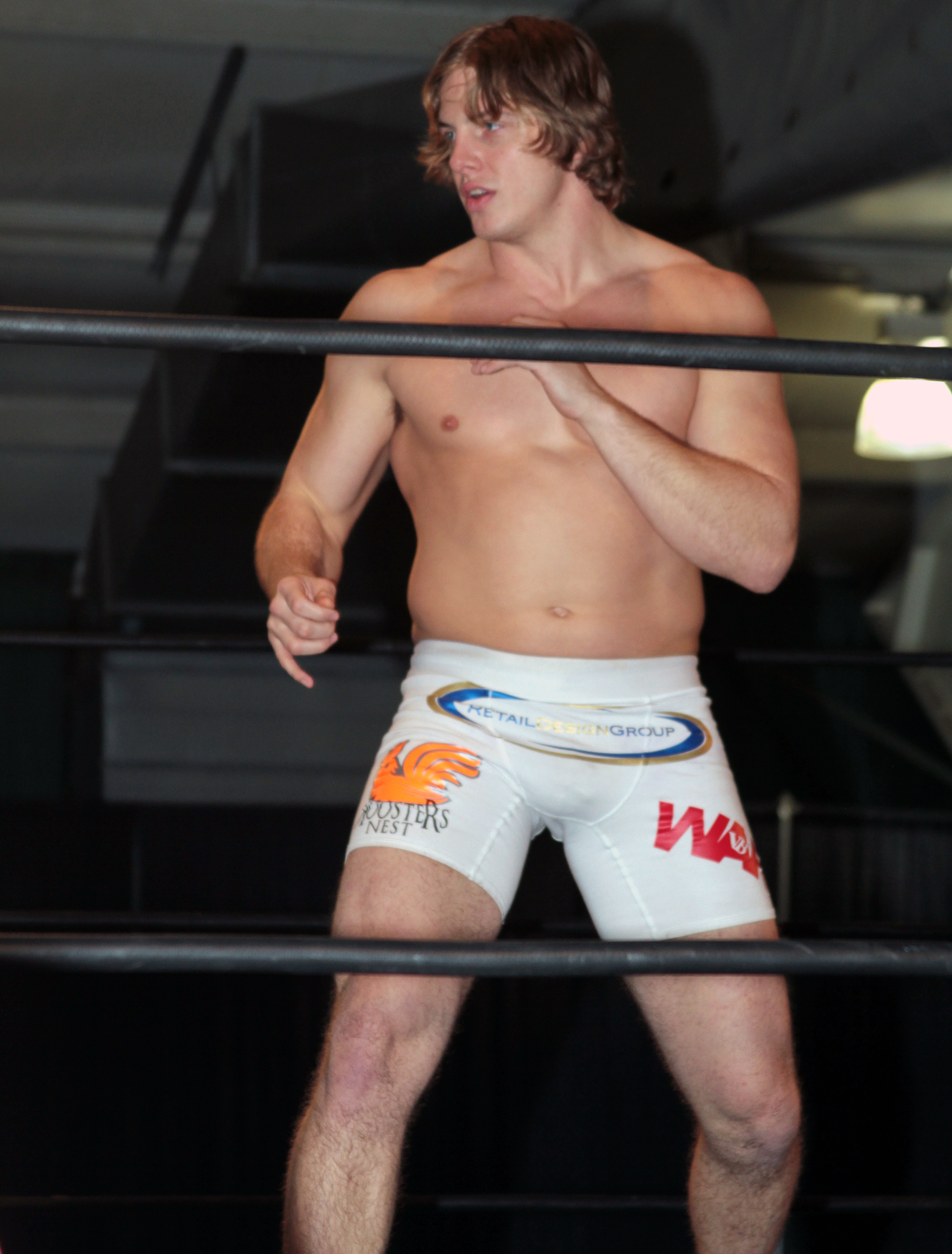
Riddle in December 2015

Shortly after being released from the Ultimate Fighting Championship (UFC), Riddle signed a multi-fight deal with Texas-based promotion, Legacy Fighting Championships. However, on May 18, 2013, it was announced that Riddle instead joined the Bellator MMA roster after his Legacy contract had been purchased by the promotion. Riddle was expected to compete in the Bellator's welterweight tournament during their ninth season which begins in the Fall of 2013. However, Riddle cracked his rib and had to pull out of the tournament, and subsequently retired from MMA fighting due to financial reasons. A few weeks later, Riddle came out of retirement and was expected to fight at Bellator 109. Once again, Riddle pulled out of that fight and was subsequently released.

=== Titan FC (2014) ===
Riddle fought fellow former UFC fighter Michael Kuiper in the co-main event of Titan FC 27 on February 28, 2014. Riddle won by second round guillotine choke.

Riddle was expected to face MMA legend Jose Landi-Jons for the vacant Welterweight Championship at Titan FC 29 on August 22, 2014. However, Landi-Jons was forced out of the bout due to visa issues, and was replaced by UFC veteran Ben Saunders. However, Riddle was forced out of the bout due to injury and was replaced by the man he was originally scheduled to face, Jose Landi-Jons.

== Professional wrestling career ==
=== Independent circuit (2014–2018) ===
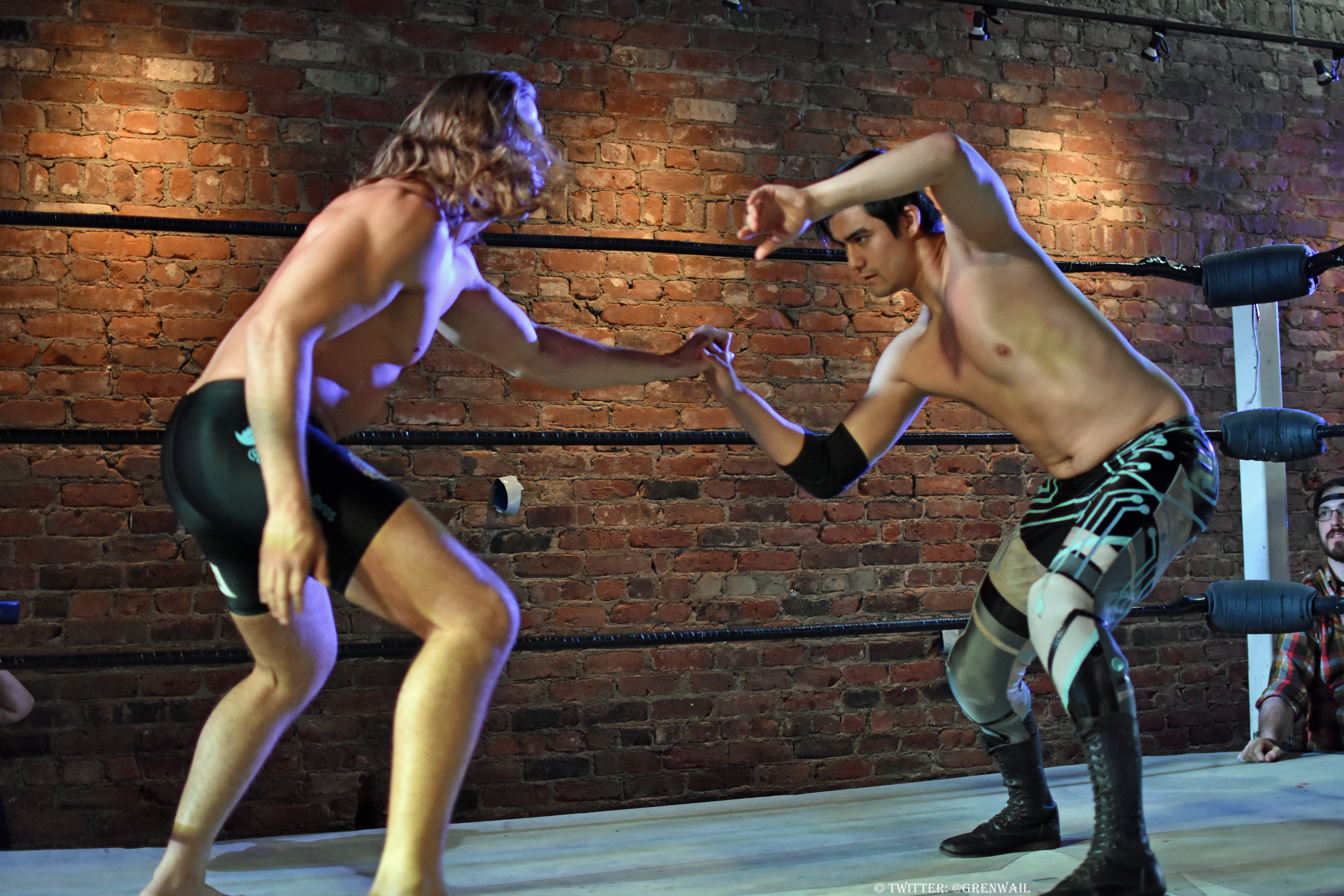
Riddle locks up with Wheeler Yuta during a May 2018 match

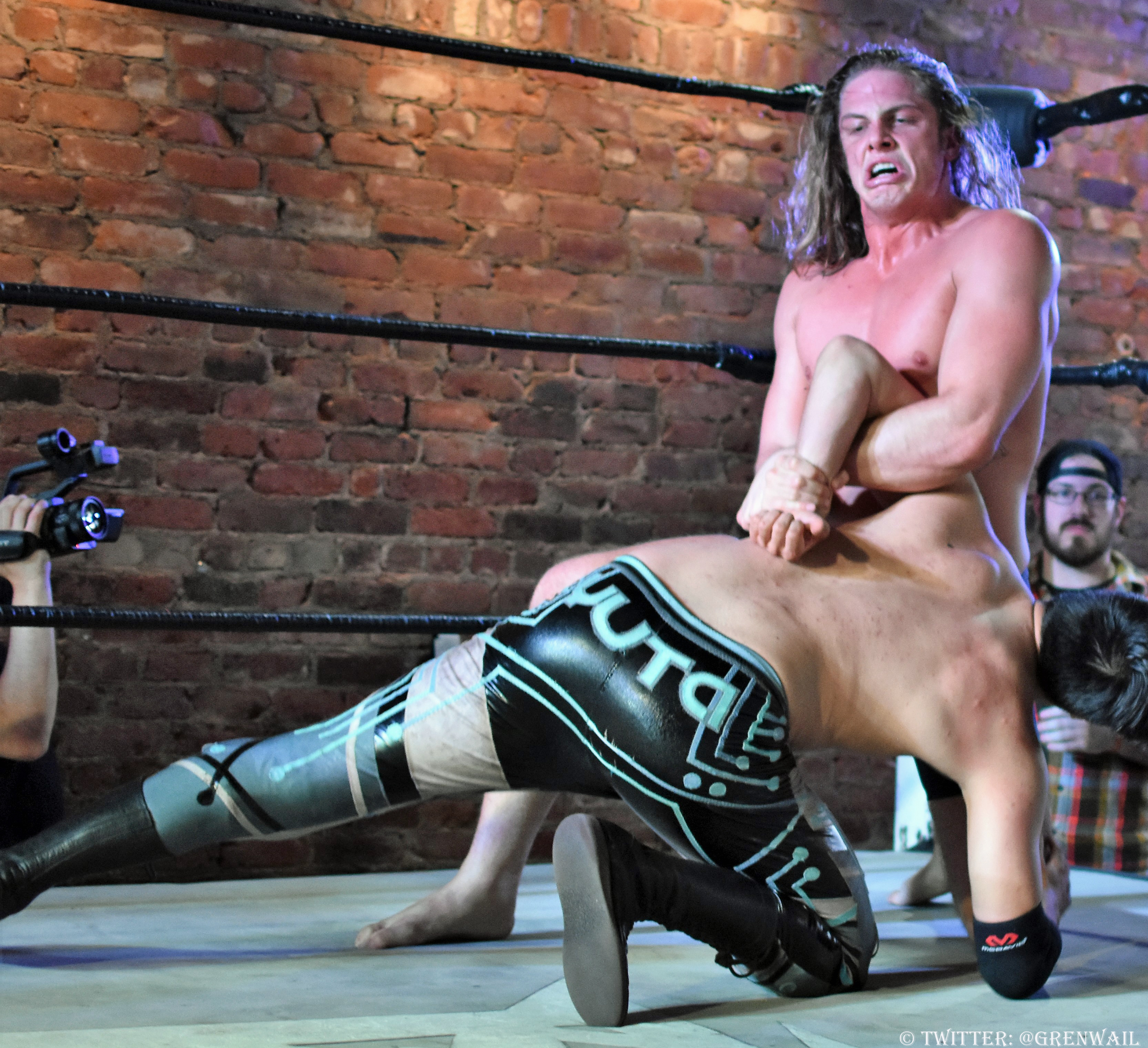
Riddle placing Yuta in a Kimura lock in May 2018

On October 29, 2014, it was reported that Riddle was training for a career in professional wrestling. Riddle made his debut on February 7, 2015, at the Monster Factory in Paulsboro, New Jersey. In July, he won the Monster Factory Heavyweight Championship. On September 15, it was announced that Riddle had signed with the World Wrestling Network (WWN) to work the October Evolve events, which he later confirmed after taking part in a WWE tryout. On January 24, 2016, Riddle won Evolve's Style Battle tournament. On April 8, Riddle signed a contract with Evolve's parent company WWN. On September 3, Riddle made his debut for Pro Wrestling Guerrilla (PWG), entering the 2016 Battle of Los Angeles tournament, from which he was eliminated in his first round match by Kyle O'Reilly. In October, Riddle faced Cody Rhodes at New York promotion House of Glory's show titled Unbreakable in a losing effort.

On January 15, 2017, Riddle defeated Rampage Brown to win the Progress Atlas Championship. Riddle debuted for Revolution Pro Wrestling on January 21, challenging Katsuyori Shibata for the British Heavyweight Championship in a losing effort. On February 11, at CZW 18, Riddle faced David Starr in an inter-promotional champion vs champion match, with Riddle defending Progress Wrestling's Atlas Championship and Starr defending wXw's Shotgun Championship. The match ended in a double disqualification, and neither championship changed hands. On April 1, Riddle defeated five other men in an elimination match to become the inaugural WWN Champion. On October 20, Riddle and Jeff Cobb, known collectively as "The Chosen Bros", defeated the Lucha Brothers (Rey Fenix and Penta el Zero M) to win the PWG World Tag Team Championship. On April 20, 2018, they lost the titles to The Rascalz (Zachary Wentz and Dezmond Xavier).

On April 5, 2018, Riddle was the host of the first edition of Game Changer Wrestling's shoot-style event, Bloodsport, and also wrestled in the main event, losing to Minoru Suzuki. On the same day, Riddle defeated Zack Sabre Jr. at Evolve 102 to win the Evolve Championship. On August 4, Riddle lost the Evolve Championship to Shane Strickland at Evolve 108.

=== WWE (2018–2023) ===
==== Early years in NXT (2018–2020) ====
On July 31, 2018, it was reported by Uproxx that Riddle had signed a contract with WWE. On August 18, Riddle appeared at NXT TakeOver: Brooklyn IV and was identified by the event's commentators as WWE's newest signing.

Riddle made his in-ring debut on the October 31 episode of NXT, defeating Luke Menzies. At NXT TakeOver: WarGames II on November 17, Riddle began a feud with Kassius Ohno, who interrupted him during an interview on the pre-show. When the show started, Riddle challenged Ohno to an impromptu match and defeated him in 6 seconds, marking the fastest match in NXT history. He then defeated Ohno in a rematch on the January 2 episode of NXT. At NXT TakeOver: Phoenix on January 26, 2019, Riddle defeated Ohno for a third time after making him submit with a series of elbow strikes to the head, ending their feud. The following month, WWE Network released a documentary on his wrestling career and entry into NXT entitled Arrival: Matt Riddle. At NXT TakeOver: New York on April 5, Riddle challenged Velveteen Dream for the NXT North American Championship in a losing effort, ending his undefeated streak in NXT.

In July, Riddle started a feud with the returning Killian Dain. On the August 7 episode of NXT, Riddle was set to face Dain, but they brawled before the match happened. Three days later, the two brawled at NXT TakeOver: Toronto and faced each other on the August 21 episode of NXT, where Dain was victorious, but Riddle attacked Dain after the match. This set up a Street Fight between the two on NXT's debut on the USA Network, which ended in a no contest. On the September 25 episode of NXT, Riddle again fought Dain in a Street Fight where the winner would face Adam Cole for the NXT Championship the following week. Riddle defeated Dain to end their feud, but failed to win the title from Cole.

On the November 1 episode of SmackDown, Riddle and Keith Lee were one of the many NXT wrestlers to invade the show, confronting and attacking Sami Zayn. Later that night, Riddle joined Triple H and the rest of the NXT roster as they declared war on both Raw and SmackDown, and vowed to win the Survivor Series brand warfare. On the November 13 episode of NXT, Finn Bálor insulted the NXT roster as "all boys who can't take a beating", specifically mentioning Johnny Gargano and Riddle, who attacked Bálor before he retreated. Riddle was originally part of Team Ciampa for NXT TakeOver: WarGames, but was taken off the team due to having a match against Bálor at the event on November 23, which he lost. The following night, at Survivor Series, Riddle was part of Team NXT in a losing effort to Team SmackDown also involving Team Raw; during the match, Riddle eliminated Randy Orton with a roll-up pin before being laid out with an RKO, which caused him to be eliminated by King Corbin. On January 26, Riddle participated in the Royal Rumble match at the namesake pay-per-view and entered at #23, but was eliminated by Corbin in 41 seconds.

==== Championship reigns (2020–2021) ====
On January 1, 2020, Riddle and Pete Dunne were announced as surprise participants in the 2020 Dusty Rhodes Tag Team Classic; they would later take on the name of The BroserWeights, a portmanteau of Riddle's "Original Bro" nickname and Dunne's "Bruiserweight" nickname. They defeated Mark Andrews and Flash Morgan Webster in the first round, Fabian Aichner and Marcel Barthel of Imperium in the semifinals, and Grizzled Young Veterans (James Drake and Zack Gibson) in the finals to win the tournament and earn a match against Bobby Fish and Kyle O'Reilly of The Undisputed Era for the NXT Tag Team Championship at NXT TakeOver: Portland. At the event on February 16, Riddle and Dunne defeated Fish and O'Reilly to win the titles, marking Riddle's first title win in WWE. When Dunne couldn't travel to the United States because of the COVID-19 pandemic, he picked Timothy Thatcher as his replacement for Riddle's partner. Riddle and Thatcher lost the titles to Imperium (Aichner and Barthel) on the May 13 episode of NXT after Thatcher walked out on him. On the May 27 episode of NXT, Riddle faced Thatcher in a Fight Pit match with WWE Hall of Famer Kurt Angle as the special guest referee, but lost in what would be his last match in NXT.

On May 29, Angle announced that Riddle would move to the SmackDown brand. On the June 19 episode of SmackDown, Riddle made his main roster debut, interrupting Intercontinental Champion AJ Styles before defeating Styles in a non-title match. Riddle received an opportunity at the title on the July 17 episode of SmackDown, where he lost to Styles. After the match, he was attacked by King Corbin. Riddle defeated Corbin at Payback on August 30, but lost in a rematch on the September 25 episode of SmackDown, ending their feud.

As part of the 2020 Draft, Riddle was drafted to the Raw brand. On October 29, his ring name was shortened to Riddle. At Survivor Series on November 22, Riddle was a part of Team Raw in the men's traditional elimination tag team match, pinning Corbin on route to a clean sweep for Team Raw. On the January 4, 2021 episode of Raw, Riddle defeated United States Champion Bobby Lashley in a non-title match, earning a title match the following week in a losing effort. On the January 25 episode of Raw, Riddle defeated The Hurt Business (Cedric Alexander, MVP, and Shelton Benjamin) in a gauntlet match to earn another title opportunity against Lashley. At Royal Rumble on January 31, Riddle entered at #16 and helped eliminate Lashley before being eliminated by Seth Rollins. Riddle received his title match the following night on Raw, where he defeated Lashley by disqualification but did not win the championship. At Elimination Chamber on February 21, Riddle defeated Lashley and John Morrison in a triple threat match to win the United States Championship, his first title on the main roster and his first singles title in WWE. He successfully defended the title against Mustafa Ali at the Fastlane pre-show on March 21. At Night 2 of WrestleMania 37 on April 11, Riddle lost the title to Sheamus, ending his reign at 49 days.

==== RK-Bro (2021–2022) ====
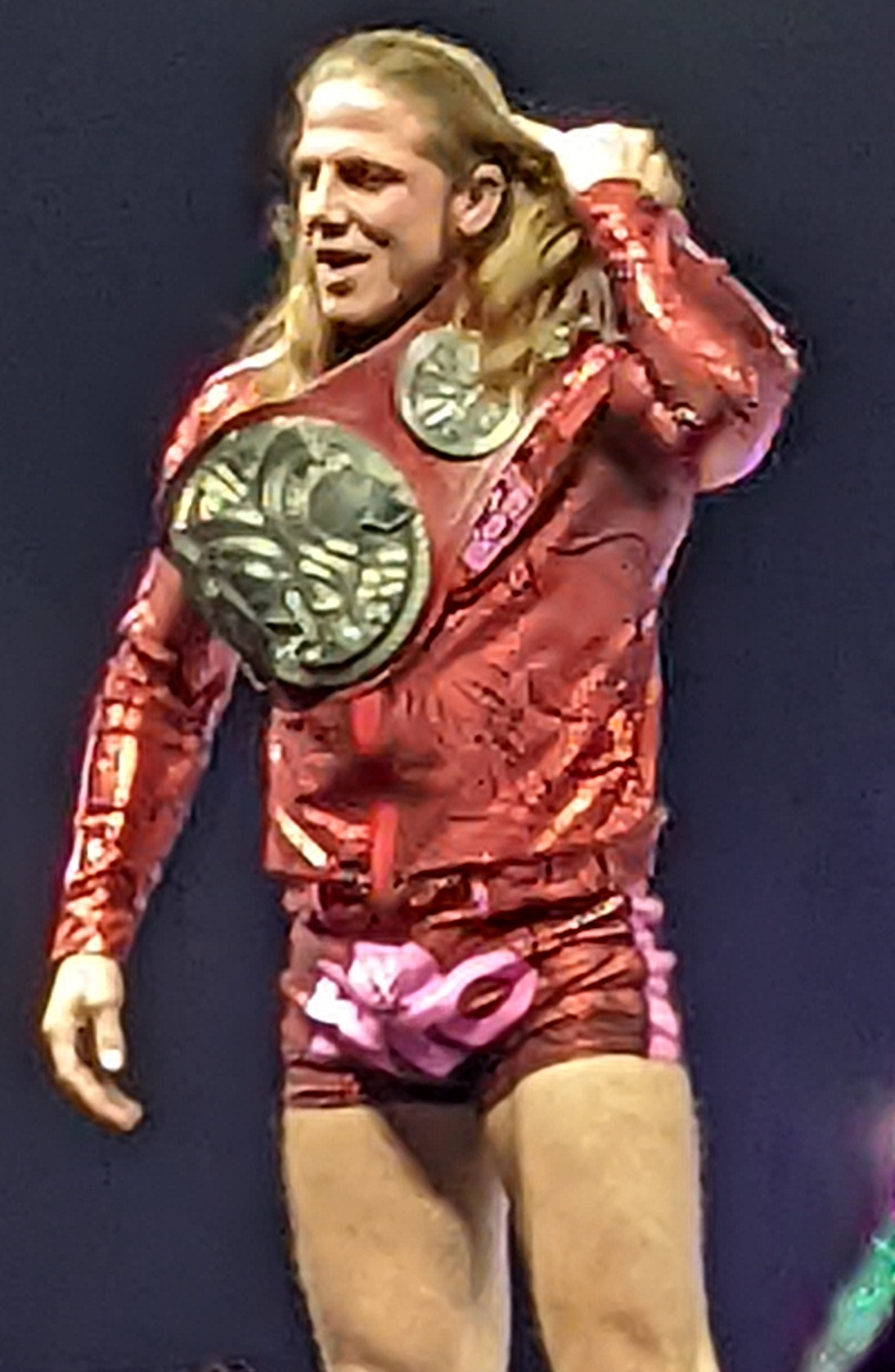
Riddle with the WWE Raw Tag Team Championship in 2022.

On the April 19 episode of Raw, Riddle interrupted a backstage interview by Randy Orton and suggested a tag team formation, with Orton dismissing the idea by leaving. A match was made later on in the night between Orton and Riddle, which Riddle won with a roll-up. The following week on Raw, Orton was backstage with Riddle when he suggested the team be given a try; the newly labeled RK-Bro defeated Cedric Alexander and Shelton Benjamin, and in a backstage interview afterwards, Orton suggested to Riddle they take the team "a day at a time".

After a seven-week absence, Orton returned on the August 9 episode of Raw, where he initially discontinued his team with Riddle at the beginning of the show. Later that night, Orton defeated AJ Styles in a match following assistance from Riddle and afterwards pretended to hug him but instead hit him with an RKO as a sign of gratitude. The following week, Orton officially reunited the team after Riddle saved Orton from an attack at the hands of Omos and Styles. At SummerSlam on August 21, RK-Bro defeated Styles and Omos to win their first WWE Raw Tag Team Championship, both individually and as a team. On October 21, at Crown Jewel, RK-Bro defeated Styles and Omos in a rematch to retain the titles. At Day 1 on January 1, 2022, RK-Bro retained their titles against The Street Profits (Angelo Dawkins and Montez Ford).

On the January 10 episode of Raw, RK-Bro lost the titles to Alpha Academy (Chad Gable and Otis), ending their reign at 142 days. On January 29, Riddle participated in the Royal Rumble match at the namesake event before being eliminated by eventual winner Brock Lesnar. Riddle competed in the WWE Championship Elimination Chamber match at the namesake event on February 19, but was again eliminated by Lesnar. On the March 7 episode of Raw, RK-Bro won their second Raw Tag Team Championship after defeating Alpha Academy and Kevin Owens and Seth "Freakin" Rollins in a triple threat tag team match. At Night 2 of WrestleMania 38 on April 3, RK-Bro successfully defended their titles in another triple threat tag team match against Alpha Academy and the Street Profits. Following WrestleMania, SmackDown Tag Team Champions The Usos (Jey Uso and Jimmy Uso) challenged RK-Bro to an unification match at WrestleMania Backlash on May 8, which RK-Bro accepted. The match at the event, however, was changed into a six-man tag team match, where The Bloodline (Roman Reigns and The Usos) defeated RK-Bro and Drew McIntyre. The unification match later took place on the May 20 episode of SmackDown, where RK-Bro lost their titles to The Usos, ending their second reign at 74 days.

==== Feud with Seth Rollins and departure (2022–2023) ====
After Orton was sidelined with a back injury, Riddle continued to feud with The Bloodline, teaming with Shinsuke Nakamura to unsuccessfully challenge The Usos for the Undisputed WWE Tag Team Championship on the June 3 episode of SmackDown following a distraction from Bloodline associate Sami Zayn. The following week on SmackDown, Riddle defeated Zayn to earn a match against Reigns for the Undisputed WWE Universal Championship, with the added stipulation that Riddle would be barred from challenging for the title again if he lost. On the June 17 episode of SmackDown, Riddle failed to win the title from Reigns, barring him from challenging Reigns for the title again. He then began a feud with Seth "Freakin" Rollins, setting up a match between the two at SummerSlam. However, the match was postponed after Riddle suffered a storyline injury following an attack by Rollins on the July 25 episode of Raw. Despite this, both Riddle and Rollins appeared at SummerSlam on July 30, engaging in a brawl which saw Rollins come out on top. At Clash at the Castle on September 3, Riddle lost to Rollins. On the September 19 episode of Raw, it was announced that Riddle and Rollins would have a rematch in a Fight Pit match on October 8 at Extreme Rules in which Daniel Cormier would serve as special guest referee. At the event, Riddle defeated Rollins by submission. Riddle failed to win the United States Championship from Rollins on the October 17 episode of Raw, ending their feud.

On the December 5 episode of Raw, after he and Kevin Owens failed to win the Undisputed WWE Tag Team Championship from The Usos, WWE wrote Riddle off television by having Solo Sikoa "injure" him during a brawl in the ring. On December 12, it was reported that the segment was done after Riddle had been suspended for 60 days after failing WWE's wellness policy for a second time. In a 2024 interview with Ariel Helwani, Riddle revealed that he had tested positive for cocaine, which caused his suspension. Riddle returned on the April 3, 2023, episode of Raw, attacking The Miz. He resumed feuding with The Bloodline by joining forces with Kevin Owens and Sami Zayn, but they lost to The Bloodline in a six-man tag team match at Backlash on May 6.

At Money in the Bank on July 1, Riddle unsuccessfully challenged Gunther for the Intercontinental Championship. Following this, Riddle began teaming with Drew McIntyre, feuding with The Viking Raiders (Erik and Ivar). Riddle was involved in an incident at John F. Kennedy International Airport on August 21, 2023 involving Port Authority Police. On the September 4 episode of Raw, Riddle and McIntyre lost to The Viking Raiders in a tornado tag team match, which marked Riddle's final match and appearance for the company. On September 22, 2023, Riddle announced his departure from WWE on Twitter, and RK-Bro was officially disbanded immediately.

=== Major League Wrestling (2024–present) ===
Riddle returned to Major League Wrestling (MLW) at Kings of Colosseum on January 6, 2024, defeating Jacob Fatu. On February 24, at Intimidation Games, Riddle successfully defended his NJPW World Television Championship against Bad Dude Tito. On March 29, at War Chamber, he successfully defended the title against Kosei Fujita. On June 1, Riddle won the Battle Riot VI.

On January 11, 2025 at Kings of Colosseum, Riddle defeated Satoshi Kojima to win the MLW World Heavyweight Championship for the first time. On September 13 at Fightland, Riddle lost the title to Mads Krule Krügger, ending his reign at 245 days. On October 4 at Slaughterhouse, Riddle turned heel for the first time in his career after defeating Alex Hammerstone with a low blow and declaring himself as the "Rude Dude". On November 8 at an MLW Fusion taping, Riddle defeated Austin Aries to win the MLW National Openweight Championship.

=== New Japan Pro-Wrestling (2024) ===
On January 5, 2024, at New Year Dash!!, Riddle made his New Japan Pro-Wrestling (NJPW) debut in a pre-taped vignette, challenging NJPW World Television Champion Hiroshi Tanahashi. It was then announced that Riddle would be making his NJPW in-ring debut at Battle in the Valley, teaming with a mystery partner against Zack Sabre Jr. and Bad Dude Tito of TMDK. At Battle in the Valley on January 13, Riddle's mystery partner was revealed to be his former Chosen Bros partner Jeff Cobb, defeating TMDK. On February 23, Riddle defeated Tanahashi at The New Beginning in Sapporo to win the NJPW World Television Championship. At Windy City Riot on April 12, Riddle lost the title to Sabre Jr., ending his reign at 49 days.

=== Return to the independent circuit (2024–present) ===
On February 2, 2024, Riddle made his return to the independent circuit at Adrenaline Championship Wrestling's Bromance in Hagerstown, Maryland, defeating Chris Slade. He went on to win the Combat 1 World Championship in a 3 way match at Combat 1 Wrestling's WrestleRama: Bro-Down in Brighton, Michigan on February 8, 2024. However, he would be the last Combat 1 World Champion as the promotion would close its doors in October 2024. On March 9, Matt Riddle would face Rob Van Dam in a singles match ending in a no contest at World Classic Professional Big Time Wrestling's The Reunion 3: Calvacade Of Legends in Chillicothe, Ohio. The two would later team up in a tag team match, defeating America's Most Wanted (Chris Harris and James Storm). Riddle also took part in WrestleMania 40 weekend festivities during the WrestleCon Mark Hitchcock Memorial Supershow at the 2300 Arena in Philadelphia, Pennsylvania on April 4, where he teamed up with Mustafa Ali in a tag team match, defeating The Rascalz (Trey Miguel and Zachary Wentz). Riddle would defeat PCO the next day at Battleground Championship Wrestling's Born to Die.

=== Lucha Libre AAA Worldwide (2024) ===
Riddle made his debut for Lucha Libre AAA Worldwide (AAA) on August 17, 2024 at Triplemanía XXXII: Mexico City, where he defeated Komander and Laredo Kid in a three-way match for the AAA World Cruiserweight Championship. Riddle had his first successful title defense against El Fiscal on October 6 at Héroes Inmortales. Riddle lost the title to Laredo Kid on December 7 at Cierre De La Origenes.

=== Total Nonstop Action Wrestling (2024) ===
Riddle made his debut for Total Nonstop Action Wrestling (TNA) at Turning Point on November 29, 2024, where he teamed with Kushida and Zachary Wentz in a losing effort to The Hardys and Ace Austin.

== Boxing ==
On November 16, 2026, it was announced that Riddle would make his professional boxing debut on the undercard of Misfits Boxing's event New Blood on December 18, where he would face ENA.

== Personal life ==
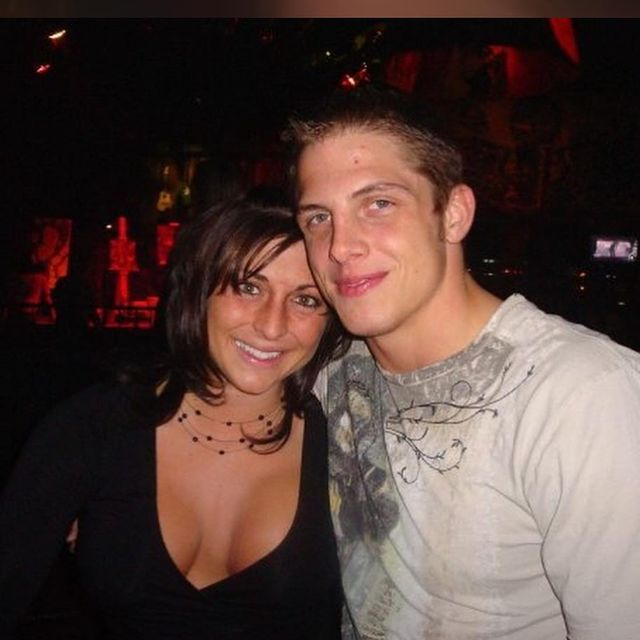
Riddle and his former wife Lisa in April 2011

Riddle married Lisa Rennie in 2011. They have fraternal twin daughters and a son. The couple divorced in March 2022. Since November 2022, he has been dating adult film actress Misha Montana. On July 7, 2023, Riddle announced that they are expecting their first child, and Riddle's fourth. On December 1, 2023, they welcomed their son.

Riddle is an experienced practitioner of Brazilian jiu-jitsu and was promoted to black belt in the sport by Daniel Gracie, Rolles Gracie, and David Floridia on January 28, 2022.

=== Sexual assault allegation ===
In the summer of 2020, Riddle was accused of sexually assaulting female independent wrestler Candy Cartwright. Cartwright alleges that after an independent show in May 2018, Riddle asked her to have sex with him, and when Cartwright turned down Riddle's request, she claims that Riddle choked her and forced her to give him oral sex. WWE released a statement claiming they were looking into the incident; Riddle immediately denied the allegations in a video posted to his Twitter page. Riddle stated that he had an affair with Cartwright, but sexual relations between the two were completely consensual.

Riddle later filed for a restraining order against Cartwright, alleging that she harassed, stalked, and threatened his safety both in person and over the internet. In September 2020, Riddle withdrew his petition for a restraining order. On October 8, 2020, Cartwright filed a lawsuit against Riddle, WWE, and Evolve president Gabe Sapolsky over the incident. In March 2021, the court dismissed WWE and Sapolsky as defendants in the suit, stating that their connection to the allegations could not be proven. Cartwright dropped the lawsuit on July 13, 2021.

== Other media ==
Riddle made his video game debut as a playable character in WWE 2K20 and subsequently in WWE 2K22 and WWE 2K23. On June 22, 2022, Riddle made an appearance on The Tonight Show Starring Jimmy Fallon.

== Championships and accomplishments ==
=== Amateur Wrestling ===
- New York State Public High School Athletic Association
  - New York Division I 189 lb state champion out of Saratoga Springs High School (2004)

=== Mixed martial arts ===
- Ultimate Fighting Championship
  - Fight of the Night (1 time) vs. Lance Benoist
  - Submission of the Night (1 time) vs. Chris Clements
- Greatest Knockout in The Ultimate Fighter

=== Professional wrestling ===
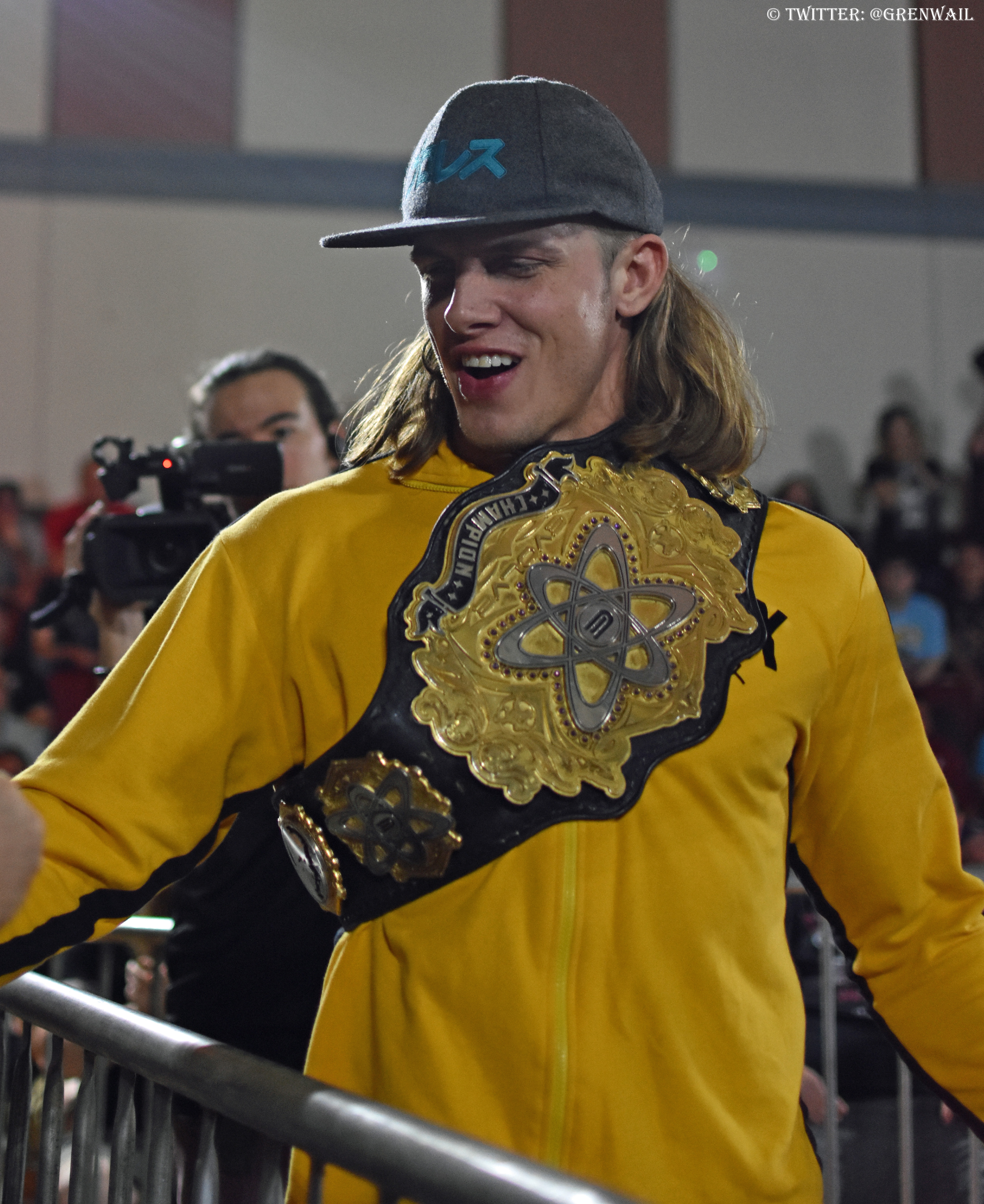
Riddle as EVOLVE Champion in June 2018

- 5 Star Wrestling
  - 5 Star Tap or Snap Championship (1 time, final)
- AAW: Professional Wrestling Redefined
  - AAW Heavyweight Championship (1 time)
- Boca Raton Championship Wrestling
  - BRCW Heavyweight Championship (1 time, current)
  - BRCW Tag Team Championship (1 time) – with Stallion Rogers
- Beyond Wrestling
  - Tournament for Today Men (2016)
- Coastal Championship Wrestling
  - CCW Tag Team Championship (1 time) – with Stallion Rogers
- Combat 1 Wrestling
  - Combat 1 World Championship (1 time, final)
- Evolve
  - Evolve Championship (1 time)
  - Style Battle (2016)
- Hope Wrestling
  - Hope 24/7 Hardcore Championship (1 time)
- IWA Mid-South
  - Revolution Strong Style Tournament (2018)
- Keystone Pro Wrestling
  - KPW Tag Team Championship (1 time) – with Punisher Martinez
- Lucha Libre AAA Worldwide
  - AAA World Cruiserweight Championship (1 time)
- Major League Wrestling
  - MLW World Heavyweight Championship (1 time)
  - MLW National Openweight Championship (1 time, current)
  - Battle Riot (2024, 2025)
- Monster Factory Pro Wrestling
  - Monster Factory Heavyweight Championship (1 time)
- New Japan Pro-Wrestling
  - NJPW World Television Championship (1 time)
- Pro Wrestling Illustrated
  - Ranked No. 46 of the top 500 singles wrestlers in the PWI 500 in 2018
- Progress Wrestling
  - Progress Atlas Championship (2 times)
- Pro Wrestling Chaos
  - King of Chaos Championship (1 time)
- Pro Wrestling Guerrilla
  - PWG World Tag Team Championship (1 time) – with Jeff Cobb
- Pennsylvania Premiere Wrestling
  - PPW Ruda Entertainment Bro Championship (1 time, inaugural, current)
- Scenic City Invitational
  - Scenic City Invitational Tournament (2017)
- Sports Illustrated
  - Ranked No. 5 of the top 10 men's wrestlers in 2018
  - Ranked No. 8 of the top 10 wrestlers in 2017
- Style Battle
  - Style Battle (8, 9)
- Westside Xtreme Wrestling
  - AMBITION 8 (2017)
- WWNLive
  - WWN Championship (1 time)
- Wrestling Observer Newsletter
  - Most Improved (2016)
  - Rookie of the Year (2016)
- World Series Wrestling
  - WSW Australian Championship (2 times)
- WWE
  - WWE United States Championship (1 time)
  - WWE Raw Tag Team Championship (2 times) – with Randy Orton
  - NXT Tag Team Championship (1 time) – with Pete Dunne
  - Dusty Rhodes Tag Team Classic (2020) – with Pete Dunne

== Mixed martial arts record ==
Professional record breakdown
13 matches	8 wins	3 losses
By knockout	1	1
By submission	1	0
By decision	5	2
By disqualification	1	0
No contests	2	

Res.	Record	Opponent	Method	Event	Date	Round	Time	Location	Notes
Win	8–3 (2)	Michael Kuiper	Submission (guillotine choke)	Titan FC 27	February 28, 2014	2	2:29	Kansas City, Kansas, United States	Middleweight bout.
NC	7–3 (2)	Che Mills	NC (overturned)	UFC on Fuel TV: Barão vs. McDonald	February 16, 2013	3	5:00	London, England	Originally a split decision win for Riddle. Result overturned after he tested positive for cannabis.
Win	7–3 (1)	John Maguire	Decision (unanimous)	UFC 154	November 17, 2012	3	5:00	Montreal, Quebec, Canada	
NC	6–3 (1)	Chris Clements	NC (overturned)	UFC 149	July 21, 2012	3	2:02	Calgary, Alberta, Canada	Originally an arm-triangle submission win for Riddle. Submission of the Night. Result overturned after he tested positive for cannabis.
Win	6–3	Henry Martinez	Decision (split)	UFC 143	February 4, 2012	3	5:00	Las Vegas, Nevada, United States	
Loss	5–3	Lance Benoist	Decision (unanimous)	UFC Fight Night: Shields vs. Ellenberger	September 17, 2011	3	5:00	New Orleans, Louisiana, United States	Fight of the Night.
Loss	5–2	Sean Pierson	Decision (unanimous)	UFC 124	December 11, 2010	3	5:00	Montreal, Quebec, Canada	
Win	5–1	DaMarques Johnson	TKO (punches)	UFC Live: Jones vs. Matyushenko	August 1, 2010	2	4:29	San Diego, California, United States	172 lb Catchweight bout; Johnson missed weight.
Win	4–1	Greg Soto	DQ (illegal upkick)	UFC 111	March 27, 2010	3	1:30	Newark, New Jersey, United States	
Loss	3–1	Nick Osipczak	TKO (elbows and punches)	UFC 105	November 14, 2009	3	3:53	Manchester, England	
Win	3–0	Dan Cramer	Decision (unanimous)	UFC 101	August 8, 2009	3	5:00	Philadelphia, Pennsylvania, United States	
Win	2–0	Steve Bruno	Decision (unanimous)	UFC Fight Night: Lauzon vs. Stephens	February 7, 2009	3	5:00	Tampa, Florida, United States	Welterweight debut.
Win	1–0	Dante Rivera	Decision (unanimous)	The Ultimate Fighter 7 Finale	June 21, 2008	3	5:00	Las Vegas, Nevada, United States	

Exhibition record breakdown		
2 matches	1 win	1 loss
By knockout	1	0
By submission	0	1

Res.	Record	Opponent	Method	Event	Date	Round	Time	Location	Notes
Loss	1–1	Tim Credeur	Submission (armbar)	The Ultimate Fighter: Team Rampage vs. Team Forrest	April 23, 2008 (air date)	2	4:06	Las Vegas, Nevada, United States	TUF 7 Quarter Final round.
Win	1–0	Dan Simmler	KO (punch)	The Ultimate Fighter: Team Rampage vs. Team Forrest	April 9, 2008 (air date)	2	0:09	Las Vegas, Nevada, United States	TUF 7 elimination round.
