= Ben Saunders (fighter) =

American mixed martial arts fighter (born 1983)

- Born: April 13, 1983 (age 43); Fort Lauderdale, Florida, United States
- Other names: Killa B
- Height: 6 ft 3 in (1.91 m)
- Weight: 170 lb (77 kg; 12 st)
- Division: Welterweight
- Reach: 77 1/2 in (197 cm)
- Stance: Southpaw
- Fighting out of: Orlando, Florida, United States
- Team: American Top Team (2006–present); Gracie Barra Orlando (2004–2005)
- Rank: Black belt in 10th Planet Jiu-Jitsu under Eddie Bravo; Black belt in Brazilian Jiu-Jitsu under Ricardo Libório
- Years active: 2004–2021

Mixed martial arts record
- Total: 38
- Wins: 23
- By knockout: 11
- By submission: 6
- By decision: 6
- Losses: 13
- By knockout: 9
- By submission: 1
- By decision: 3
- Draws: 2

Other information
- Mixed martial arts record from Sherdog
- Last updated on: January 20, 2010

Benjamin Saunders (born April 13, 1983) is an American former mixed martial artist who fought in the Welterweight division. He was a featured fighter on The Ultimate Fighter: Team Hughes vs. Team Serra, fighting on Team Serra. A professional competitor since 2004, Saunders competed in the UFC and Bellator.

== Background ==
Saunders was born in Fort Lauderdale, Florida, where he lived until he was in the third grade when he moved to Coral Springs, Florida. Saunders parents were divorced, and as a result he lived with his father. His older brother, Jacob, who practiced karate, helped teach his younger brother about the martial art. His twin brother, Joe, is a former member of the Florida Legislature. When Saunders was eight years old, he had a friend who was learning Tang Soo Do, which the two soon began practicing daily. However, due to poor financial status Saunders was unable to pay for legitimate instruction. At the age of 14, Saunders began training in Jeet Kune Do and worked at fast food restaurants so that he could pay the tuition. He worked out with his J. P. Taravella High School wrestling team where he learned wrestling techniques in exchange for submission techniques that he knew. Saunders, although not an instigator of street fights, did not back down from challenges and was also involved in countless street fights while growing up. At the age of 18, Saunders told his parents that he was leaving for Valencia College, when in fact he was going to train with Din Thomas to become a professional fighter.

== Mixed martial arts career ==
=== The Ultimate Fighter ===
Saunders defeated Dan Barrera in the first round of the competition by majority decision. Saunders reportedly contracted influenza after the Barrera bout. Despite the illness, Saunders competed in the quarter-finals against Tom Speer, losing via unanimous decision.

=== Ultimate Fighting Championship ===
Saunders defeated Dan Barrera at The Ultimate Fighter: Team Hughes vs Team Serra Finale by unanimous decision.

In his second career UFC fight, Saunders defeated UFC newcomer Ryan Thomas by armbar in the second round.

In his third career UFC fight he fought Brandon Wolff, defeating him in the first round via TKO with knees from the Thai clinch, landing 42 knees on his opponent. This left Wolff's face a bloody and swollen mess. After the bout many comparisons were made between him and Anderson Silva, who is also known for his Thai clinch prowess.

Saunders' next fight was supposed to be at UFC 96 against Welterweight standout Dustin Hazelett, but due to injury Hazelett pulled out of the match. Saunders was then set to face UFC newcomer Ryan Madigan. However, Saunders later pulled out of the match due to an injured foot.

On February 28, 2009, it was confirmed that Saunders would be facing Mike Swick at UFC 99. Saunders was defeated by Swick by TKO in the second round. As Swick struck, Saunders ducked into Swick's striking range every time which essentially cost him the fight.

Saunders defeated Marcus Davis on November 21, 2009, via KO due to multiple knees at 3:24 into the first round at UFC 106 making him the first man to knock out Davis.

Saunders was expected to face off against top ten welterweight Martin Kampmann at UFC 111 in March. However, an injury forced Kampmann off the card and Saunders was set to face Jake Ellenberger. On March 25, 2010, news broke that Thiago Alves's pre-fight CT scan found an irregularity in his brain, and he was not cleared to fight. Saunders asked to fight Alves's opponent and former #1 contender Jon Fitch, forcing Saunder's opponent Ellenberger out of the match. Saunders lost to Fitch by unanimous decision.

Saunders next faced Dennis Hallman on August 7, 2010, at UFC 117. Ben lost the fight by unanimous decision (29–28, 30–27, 29–28). Following the loss, Saunders was cut from the UFC.

=== Bellator ===
On February 3, it was announced by Bellator that they had signed Saunders to compete in their Welterweight division. Although he will not be a part of the Season Four Tournament, Saunders fights aired live on the main card.

At Bellator 39 Saunders defeated Matt Lee by TKO (doctor stoppage) in the third round after brutalizing Lee in the clinch with knees and elbows for most of the fight.

Saunders was expected to fight at Bellator 47 but had to pull out of the event due to an undisclosed injury he suffered in training.

Saunders was expected to face Rick Hawn at Bellator 49. But Hawn later pulled out of the bout due to a knee injury. Saunders instead fought replacement Chris Cisneros. Saunders won by TKO in the third round.

In the semifinals, Saunders faced Luis Santos at Bellator 53. After getting taken down in the beginning of the first round, Saunders controlled the round by stifling Santos' offense and going for many submission attempts, transitioning from the reverse triangle to the omoplata. The second round played out in similar fashion with Saunders almost getting an omoplata and a carni on two separate occasions. Saunders eventually submitted his opponent via Americana armlock transitioning from an arm triangle attempt while in half guard in the third round.

In the finals, he faced Douglas Lima at Bellator 57 and lost via KO in the second round.

Saunders took part in Bellator Season Six Welterweight Tournament. Saunders faced Raul Amaya in the quarterfinals at Bellator 63 and won by unanimous decision.

Saunders lost by unanimous decision to Bryan Baker in the semifinals at Bellator 67.

Saunders defeated Brian Warren in just 22 seconds of the first round by TKO due to Knee Strikes at Bellator 72.

Bellator MMA announced Saunders as a competitor in the Bellator's Season Eight Welterweight Tournament. Saunders defeated Koffi Adzitso via unanimous decision at Bellator 86 in the Quarterfinals.

Saunders rematched Raul Amaya at Bellator 90 in the semifinals and won via KO due to a head kick in round one.

Saunders was scheduled to face Douglas Lima in a rematch in the tournament final at Bellator 93. However, Lima broke his hand so the match was rescheduled for later this year. Saunders eventually faced Lima on September 20, 2013, at Bellator 100. He lost the fight via knockout due to a head kick in the second round. After the loss, Saunders was released from the promotion.

=== Titan Fighting Championships ===
In June 2014, Saunders signed with Titan Fighting Championships. For his first fight with the promotion, Saunders was scheduled face UFC veteran Matt Riddle for the vacant TFC Welterweight Championship at Titan FC 29 on August 22, 2014. Riddle, however, withdrew from the bout and was replaced by MMA veteran Jose Landi-Jons. However, that fight was cancelled when Titan FC granted Saunders permission to return to the UFC.

=== Return to the UFC ===
On August 7, 2014, it was announced that Saunders would return to fight for the UFC. Saunders faced promotional newcomer Chris Heatherly on August 23, 2014, at UFC Fight Night 49. He was successful in his return, winning the fight in the first round with the first successful omoplata submission in the UFC. The impressive victory also earned Saunders his first Performance of the Night bonus award.

Saunders then faced Joe Riggs on December 13, 2014, at UFC on Fox 13. He won the fight by TKO due to injury after Riggs hurt his neck during a takedown and tapped out.

Saunders was expected to face Erick Silva on March 21, 2015, at UFC Fight Night 62. However, he pulled out of the fight in early March citing an injury.

Saunders faced Kenny Robertson on July 25, 2015, at UFC on Fox 16. He won the back-and-forth fight by split decision.

Saunders faced Patrick Côté on January 17, 2016, at UFC Fight Night 81. He lost by TKO in the second round.

Saunders next faced Court McGee on January 15, 2017, at UFC Fight Night 103. He won the fight via unanimous decision.

Saunders faced Peter Sobotta on May 28, 2017, at UFC Fight Night 109. He lost the fight via TKO in the second round.

Saunders faced Alan Jouban on February 24, 2018, at UFC on Fox 28. He lost the back-and-forth fight via knockout in the second round. This fight earned him the Fight of the Night bonus.

Saunders faced Jake Ellenberger on June 1, 2018, at UFC Fight Night 131, replacing an injured Bryan Barberena. Saunders won the fight by TKO due to a knee to the liver and punches. This win earn him Performance of the Night award.

Saunders faced Sérgio Moraes on September 22, 2018, at UFC Fight Night 137. He lost the fight via a submission in round two.

Saunders faced Lyman Good on November 3, 2018, at UFC 230, replacing an injured Sultan Aliev. He lost the fight via knockout in round one.

Saunders faced promotional newcomer Takashi Sato on April 27, 2019, at UFC Fight Night: Jacaré vs. Hermansson. He lost the fight via TKO in the second round.

Saunders faced Matt Brown December 14, 2019, at UFC 245. He lost the fight via knockout in the second round. The fight marked the last fight of Saunders' prevailing contract and the UFC opted not to renew it, making Saunders a free agent.

=== Post UFC ===
Saunders faced Ramsey Nijem on July 30, 2021, at XMMA 2. He won the bout via unanimous decision.

Saunders has also announced that he will be opening a new branch of 10th Planet, in Orlando, Florida, where he will serve as the head coach.

== Championships and accomplishments ==
- Combat Fighting Championships
  - CFC Welterweight Championship (One time)
- Ultimate Fighting Championship
  - Performance of the Night (Two times) vs. Chris Heatherly and Jake Ellenberger
  - Fight of the Night (One time) vs. Alan Jouban
  - UFC.com Awards
    - 2014: Ranked #3 Submission of the Year vs. Chris Heatherly
- World MMA Awards
  - 2014 Submission of the Year vs. Chris Heatherly at UFC Fight Night: Henderson vs. dos Anjos
- Bleacher Report
  - 2014 Submission of the Year vs. Chris Heatherly at UFC Fight Night: Henderson vs. dos Anjos
- Combat Press
  - 2014 Submission of the Year vs. Chris Heatherly at UFC Fight Night: Henderson vs. dos Anjos
- Bloody Elbow
  - 2014 Submission of the Year vs. Chris Heatherly at UFC Fight Night: Henderson vs. dos Anjos

== Mixed martial arts record ==
Professional record breakdown
38 matches	23 wins	13 losses
By knockout	11	9
By submission	6	1
By decision	6	3
Draws	2	

Res.	Record	Opponent	Method	Event	Date	Round	Time	Location	Notes
Win	23–13–2	Ramsey Nijem	Decision (unanimous)	XMMA 2: Saunders vs. Nijem	July 30, 2021	3	5:00	Greenville, South Carolina, United States	
Loss	22–13–2	Matt Brown	KO (elbow and punches)	UFC 245	December 14, 2019	2	4:55	Las Vegas, Nevada, United States	
Loss	22–12–2	Takashi Sato	TKO (punches and elbows)	UFC Fight Night: Jacaré vs. Hermansson	April 27, 2019	2	1:18	Sunrise, Florida, United States	
Loss	22–11–2	Lyman Good	KO (punches)	UFC 230	November 3, 2018	1	1:32	New York City, New York, United States	
Loss	22–10–2	Sérgio Moraes	Submission (arm-triangle choke)	UFC Fight Night: Santos vs. Anders	September 22, 2018	2	4:42	São Paulo, Brazil	
Win	22–9–2	Jake Ellenberger	KO (knee to body)	UFC Fight Night: Rivera vs. Moraes	June 1, 2018	1	1:56	Utica, New York, United States	Performance of the Night.
Loss	21–9–2	Alan Jouban	KO (punch)	UFC on Fox: Emmett vs. Stephens	February 24, 2018	2	2:38	Orlando, Florida, United States	Fight of the Night.
Loss	21–8–2	Peter Sobotta	TKO (punches and knee)	UFC Fight Night: Gustafsson vs. Teixeira	May 28, 2017	2	2:29	Stockholm, Sweden	
Win	21–7–2	Court McGee	Decision (unanimous)	UFC Fight Night: Rodríguez vs. Penn	January 15, 2017	3	5:00	Phoenix, Arizona, United States	
Win	20–7–2	Jacob Volkmann	Submission (armbar)	Fight Night at the Island	September 9, 2016	1	0:17	Welch, Minnesota, United States	
Loss	19–7–2	Patrick Côté	TKO (punches)	UFC Fight Night: Dillashaw vs. Cruz	January 17, 2016	2	1:14	Boston, Massachusetts, United States	
Win	19–6–2	Kenny Robertson	Decision (split)	UFC on Fox: Dillashaw vs. Barão 2	July 25, 2015	3	5:00	Chicago, Illinois, United States	
Win	18–6–2	Joe Riggs	TKO (neck injury)	UFC on Fox: dos Santos vs. Miocic	December 13, 2014	1	0:57	Phoenix, Arizona, United States	
Win	17–6–2	Chris Heatherly	Submission (omoplata)	UFC Fight Night: Henderson vs. dos Anjos	August 23, 2014	1	2:18	Tulsa, Oklahoma, United States	Performance of the Night.
Loss	16–6–2	Douglas Lima	KO (head kick)	Bellator 100	September 20, 2013	2	4:33	Phoenix, Arizona, United States	Bellator Season 8 Welterweight Tournament Final
Win	16–5–2	Raul Amaya	KO (head kick)	Bellator 90	February 21, 2013	1	2:56	West Valley City, Utah, United States	Bellator Season 8 Welterweight Tournament Semifinal
Win	15–5–2	Koffi Adzitso	Decision (unanimous)	Bellator 86	January 24, 2013	3	5:00	Thackerville, Oklahoma, United States	Bellator Season 8 Welterweight Tournament Quarterfinal
Win	14–5–2	Brian Warren	TKO (knees)	Bellator 72	July 20, 2012	1	0:22	Tampa, Florida, United States	
Loss	13–5–2	Bryan Baker	Decision (unanimous)	Bellator 67	May 4, 2012	3	5:00	Rama, Ontario, Canada	Bellator Season 6 Welterweight Tournament Semifinal
Win	13–4–2	Raul Amaya	Decision (unanimous)	Bellator 63	March 30, 2012	3	5:00	Uncasville, Connecticut, United States	Bellator Season 6 Welterweight Tournament Quarterfinal
Loss	12–4–2	Douglas Lima	KO (punches)	Bellator 57	November 12, 2011	2	1:21	Rama, Ontario, Canada	Bellator Season 5 Welterweight Tournament Final
Win	12–3–2	Luis Santos	Submission (americana)	Bellator 53	October 8, 2011	3	1:45	Miami, Oklahoma, United States	Bellator Season 5 Welterweight Tournament Semifinal
Win	11–3–2	Chris Cisneros	TKO (knee and punches)	Bellator 49	September 10, 2011	3	0:29	Atlantic City, New Jersey, United States	Bellator Season 5 Welterweight Tournament Quarterfinal
Win	10–3–2	Matt Lee	TKO (doctor stoppage)	Bellator 39	April 2, 2011	3	1:24	Uncasville, Connecticut, United States	
Win	9–3–2	Elijah Harshbarger	TKO (submission to punches and elbows)	WEF: Saunders vs. Harshbarger	November 6, 2010	1	4:21	Kissimmee, Florida, United States	
Loss	8–3–2	Dennis Hallman	Decision (unanimous)	UFC 117	August 7, 2010	3	5:00	Oakland, California, United States	
Loss	8–2–2	Jon Fitch	Decision (unanimous)	UFC 111	March 27, 2010	3	5:00	Newark, New Jersey, United States	
Win	8–1–2	Marcus Davis	KO (knees)	UFC 106	November 21, 2009	1	3:24	Las Vegas, Nevada, United States	
Loss	7–1–2	Mike Swick	TKO (punches)	UFC 99	June 13, 2009	2	3:47	Cologne, Germany	
Win	7–0–2	Brandon Wolff	TKO (knees)	UFC: Fight for the Troops	December 10, 2008	1	1:49	Fayetteville, North Carolina, United States	
Win	6–0–2	Ryan Thomas	Submission (armbar)	UFC 87	August 10, 2008	2	2:28	Minneapolis, Minnesota, United States	
Win	5–0–2	Dan Barrera	Decision (unanimous)	The Ultimate Fighter: Team Hughes vs. Team Serra Finale	December 8, 2007	3	5:00	Las Vegas, Nevada, United States	
Win	4–0–2	Charles Blanchard	Submission (armbar)	Combat Fighting Championships 3	February 17, 2007	1	0:46	Orlando, Florida, United States	Won the CFC Welterweight Championship.
Win	3–0–2	Kenny Stevens	TKO (punches)	Combat Fighting Championship 1	July 15, 2006	3	3:05	Orlando, Florida, United States	
Win	2–0–2	Rick Delvecchio	KO (head kick)	Absolute Fighting Championships 15	February 18, 2006	1	4:31	Fort Lauderdale, Florida, United States	
Win	1–0–2	Reggie Pena	Submission (triangle choke)	Absolute Fighting Championships 14	December 12, 2005	1	1:12	Fort Lauderdale, Florida, United States	
Draw	0–0–2	Diego Lionel Vitosky	Draw	Absolute Fighting Championships 12	April 30, 2005	2	5:00	Fort Lauderdale, Florida, United States	
Draw	0–0–1	Crafton Wallace	Draw	Absolute Fighting Championships 8	May 1, 2004	2	5:00	Fort Lauderdale, Florida, United States	

== See also ==
- List of current UFC fighters
- List of Bellator MMA alumni
- List of male mixed martial artists
