= Greg Soto =

- Born: Gregory Francis Soto; June 3, 1986 (age 40); New York, New York, United States
- Height: 5 ft 11 in (1.80 m)
- Weight: 170 lb (77 kg; 12 st)
- Division: Welterweight
- Fighting out of: Oakhurst, New Jersey
- Rank: Black belt in Brazilian Jiu-Jitsu
- Years active: 2006-2012; 2017

Mixed martial arts record
- Total: 13
- Wins: 9
- By knockout: 2
- By submission: 4
- By decision: 3
- Losses: 4
- By knockout: 1
- By submission: 2
- By disqualification: 1

Other information
- Mixed martial arts record from Sherdog

Gregory Francis Soto (born June 3, 1986) is an American mixed martial artist. A professional competitor since 2006, he has fought in the UFC.

== Mixed martial arts career ==
=== Early career ===
Soto compiled an amateur record of 3-0 before making his professional debut in 2006. After accumulating a 7–0 record as a professional, Soto signed with the UFC.

=== Ultimate Fighting Championship ===
Soto made his UFC debut at UFC 111 against Matt Riddle. He lost via disqualification after throwing an illegal upkick.

He returned at UFC 118 against Nick Osipczak. Soto won via unanimous decision.

Soto fought again at UFC 125 against Daniel Roberts. He was defeated via submission in the first round.

== Mixed martial arts record ==
Professional record breakdown
13 matches	9 wins	4 losses
By knockout	2	2
By submission	4	2
By decision	3	0

Res.	Record	Opponent	Method	Event	Date	Round	Time	Location	Notes
Loss	9–4	Thiago Reia	Submission (armbar)	CFFC 63	December 18, 2017	1	1:31	Atlantic City, New Jersey, United States	
Loss	9–3	George Sullivan	KO (punch)	CFFC 14	April 14, 2012	1	2:09	Atlantic City, New Jersey, United States	Lost the CFFC Welterweight Championship.
Win	9–2	Chip Moraza-Pollard	Submission (triangle choke)	CFFC 12	December 10, 2011	2	4:07	Atlantic City, New Jersey, United States	Won the CFFC Welterweight Championship.
Loss	8–2	Daniel Roberts	Submission (kimura)	UFC 125	January 1, 2011	1	3:45	Las Vegas, Nevada, United States	
Win	8–1	Nick Osipczak	Decision (unanimous)	UFC 118	August 28, 2010	3	5:00	Boston, Massachusetts, United States	
Loss	7–1	Matthew Riddle	DQ (illegal upkick)	UFC 111	March 27, 2010	3	1:30	Newark, New Jersey, United States	
Win	7–0	Ray Steinbeiss	Submission (rear-naked choke)	Beatdown at 4 Bears 5	October 24, 2009	2	4:10	New Town, North Dakota, United States	
Win	6–0	Craig Kaufmann	Decision (unanimous)	WCA: Caged Combat	June 5, 2009	3	5:00	Atlantic City, New Jersey, United States	
Win	5–0	Shawn Formann	Submission (D'arce choke)	Ring of Combat 23	February 20, 2009	2	3:44	Atlantic City, New Jersey, United States	
Win	4–0	Doug Gordon	Decision (unanimous)	Ring of Combat 21	September 12, 2008	3	5:00	Atlantic City, New Jersey, United States	
Win	3–0	Sergio Vinagre	KO (punch)	BCX 1 - Cage Xtreme 1	May 12, 2007	1	3:36	New Jersey, United States	
Win	2–0	Hyun Gyu Lim	Submission (armbar)	World Best Fighter: USA vs. Asia	February 3, 2007	1	0:58	Atlantic City, New Jersey, United States	
Win	1–0	Dave Church	TKO (corner stoppage)	CITC: Marked Territory	September 30, 2006	1	5:00	Lincroft, New Jersey, United States	
