= Raul Amaya =

American mixed martial arts fighter

- Born: February 2, 1986 (age 40); United States
- Other names: Smash Mode
- Nationality: American
- Height: 5 ft 10 in (1.78 m)
- Weight: 169 lb (77 kg; 12.1 st)
- Division: Welterweight (170 lb); Middleweight (185 lb)
- Reach: 71 in (180 cm)
- Fighting out of: Bradenton, Florida
- Team: Champions MMA
- Years active: 2009–present

Mixed martial arts record
- Total: 13
- Wins: 11
- By knockout: 5
- By submission: 6
- By decision: 0
- Losses: 2
- By knockout: 1
- By submission: 0
- By decision: 1
- Draws: 0
- No contests: 0

Other information
- Mixed martial arts record from Sherdog

Raul Amaya (born February 2, 1986) is an American mixed martial artist who competes in Bellator's welterweight division. Amaya is a former Art of Fighting Welterweight Champion.

== MMA career ==
=== Early career ===
Amaya started his career in 2009. He fought only for the Florida-based organization Art of Fighting.

There he compiled an undefeated record of 9–0 and earned the welterweight title before signing with Bellator.

=== Bellator Fighting Championships ===
Amaya made his debut on March 30, 2012, at Bellator 63 against the UFC and Bellator veteran Ben Saunders in the quarterfinal match of Bellator season six welterweight tournament. Amaya had his first defeat via unanimous decision.

Amaya faced Kenny Moss on July 20, 2012, at Bellator 72. He won via TKO in the second round.

Amaya faced José Gomes on January 24, 2013, at Bellator 86 in the quarterfinal match of Bellator season eight welterweight tournament. He won via TKO in the very first round.

In the semifinals, Amaya faced Ben Saunders in a rematch. The fight took place on February 21, 2013, at Bellator 90. Amaya lost via knock out in the first round.

== Championships and accomplishments ==
- Art of Fighting
  - AOF Welterweight Championship (One time)

== Mixed martial arts record ==
Professional record breakdown
14 matches	11 wins	3 losses
By knockout	5	1
By submission	6	1
By decision	0	1

Res.	Record	Opponent	Method	Event	Date	Round	Time	Location	Notes
Loss	11–3	Avery McPhatter	Technical Submission (Triangle Choke)	RFC34 - It's Time	July 24, 2015	1	2:40	Tampa, Florida, United States	
Loss	11–2	Ben Saunders	KO (head kick)	Bellator 90	February 21, 2013	1	2:56	West Valley City, Utah, United States	Bellator Season 8 Welterweight Tournament Semifinal
Win	11–1	José Gomes	TKO (punches)	Bellator 86	January 24, 2013	1	3:12	Thackerville, Oklahoma, United States	Bellator Season 8 Welterweight Tournament Quarterfinal
Win	10–1	Kenny Moss	TKO (shoulder injury)	Bellator 72	July 20, 2012	2	0:30	Tampa, Florida, United States	
Loss	9–1	Ben Saunders	Decision (unanimous)	Bellator 63	March 30, 2012	3	5:00	Uncasville, Connecticut, United States	Bellator Season 6 Welterweight Tournament Quarterfinal
Win	9–0	Jesse Lawrence	Technical submission (guillotine choke)	AOF 13 - Amaya vs. Lawrence	September 10, 2011	4	0:33	Estero, Florida, United States	Won Art of Fighting Welterweight Title
Win	8–0	Daniel McWilliams	Submission (rear-naked choke)	AOF 12 - Static	April 2, 2011	2	3:30	Jacksonville, Florida, United States	
Win	7–0	Koa Ramos	Submission (rear-naked choke)	AOF 11 - Fusion	February 19, 2011	2	1:57	Tampa, Florida, United States	
Win	6–0	Levi LaLonde	KO (punches)	AOF 10 - Nightmare	December 3, 2010	1	1:56	Estero, Florida, United States	
Win	5–0	Joe Robinson	Submission (rear-naked choke)	AOF 8 - Fury	May 22, 2010	3	4:18	Estero, Florida, United States	
Win	4–0	Daniel Lovett	Submission (rear-naked choke)	AOF 7 - Payday	April 3, 2010	3	1:00	Tampa, Florida, United States	
Win	3–0	Rory Shallcross	TKO (punches)	AOF 5 - Rumble at Robarts 5	October 23, 2009	3	1:18	Sarasota, Florida, United States	
Win	2–0	Francois Ambang	Submission (rear-naked choke)	AOF 3 - Rumble at Robarts 3	June 13, 2009	1	3:32	Sarasota, Florida, United States	
Win	1–0	Mackenzie Briggs	TKO (punches)	AOF 2 - Rumble at Robarts 2	April 25, 2009	1	1:01	Sarasota, Florida, United States	

== See also ==
- List of male mixed martial artists
