= UFC 111 =

UFC mixed martial arts event in 2010

UFC 111: St-Pierre vs. Hardy
- The poster for UFC 111: St-Pierre vs. Hardy
- Promotion: Ultimate Fighting Championship
- Date: March 27, 2010
- Venue: Prudential Center
- City: Newark, New Jersey
- Attendance: 17,000
- Total gate: $4,000,000
- Buyrate: 770,000

Event chronology
UFC Live: Vera vs. Jones	UFC 111: St-Pierre vs. Hardy	UFC Fight Night: Florian vs. Gomi

UFC 111: St-Pierre vs. Hardy was a mixed martial arts event held by the Ultimate Fighting Championship (UFC) on March 27, 2010, at the Prudential Center in Newark, New Jersey, United States.

== Background ==
The UFC Primetime series returned to build up the UFC Welterweight Championship fight between GSP and Dan Hardy. It was the first time a British fighter had ever fought for a UFC title.

Martin Kampmann was originally set to fight Ben Saunders, but Kampmann was replaced by Jake Ellenberger, due to a deep cut suffered in training by Kampmann.

Ricardo Funch was forced to pull out of a fight against Matthew Riddle for an undisclosed reason. UFC newcomer Greg Soto was his replacement.

Spike TV broadcast three preliminary bouts one hour before the live PPV broadcast began.

This event was seen in movie theaters throughout the United States via National CineMedia's Fathom event distribution service. Also, it was shown at the Cineplex Odeon chain in Canada.

On March 10, 2010 it was announced that the event was officially sold out.

There was also some controversy that the UFC airbrushed Hardy's tattoo which reads "om mani padme hum" for their promotional poster. UFC president Dana White later admitted that this was done so as to not provoke the Chinese government.

On March 25, 2010 Thiago Alves was removed from the card due to brain irregularity from a pre-fight CAT scan. After learning of the removal, Ben Saunders, who was scheduled to fight Jake Ellenberger, requested Alves's opponent, Jon Fitch, and subsequently replaced Ellenberger on the card. As a result, Ellenberger did not compete but received his "show" and "win" money to make up for the last minute switch. The fight between Kurt Pellegrino and Fabricio Camoes was moved up to the main card as a result of the cancellation.

On March 26 at the official weigh-ins, Rory Markham weighed 177 lb. He forfeited $1,000 (12.5% of his purse) to Nate Diaz.

== Results ==
Main card
Weight class				Method	Round	Time	Notes
Welterweight	Georges St-Pierre (c)	def.	Dan Hardy	Decision (unanimous) (50–43, 50–44, 50–45)	5	5:00	(Note: For the UFC Welterweight Championship.)
Heavyweight	Shane Carwin	def.	Frank Mir	KO (punches)	1	3:48	(Note: For the interim UFC Heavyweight Championship.)
Lightweight	Kurt Pellegrino	def.	Fabrício Camões	Submission (rear-naked choke)	2	4:20
Welterweight	Jon Fitch	def.	Ben Saunders	Decision (unanimous) (30–27, 30–27, 30–27)	3	5:00
Lightweight	Jim Miller	def.	Mark Bocek	Decision (unanimous) (29–28, 29–28, 29–28)	3	5:00
Preliminary card (Spike TV)
Catchweight (177 lb)	Nate Diaz	def.	Rory Markham	TKO (punches)	1	2:47
Welterweight	Ricardo Almeida	def.	Matt Brown	Submission (rear-naked choke)	2	3:30
Preliminary card
Middleweight	Rousimar Palhares	def.	Tomasz Drwal	Submission (heel hook)	1	0:45	(Note: Palhares was suspended for 90 days following the fight for failing to release the submission after the stoppage.)
Light Heavyweight	Jared Hamman	def.	Rodney Wallace	Decision (unanimous) (29–28, 29–28, 29–28)	3	5:00
Welterweight	Matthew Riddle	def.	Greg Soto	DQ (illegal upkick)	3	1:30

== Bonus awards ==
The following fighters received $65,000 bonuses:

- Fight of the Night: Rodney Wallace vs. Jared Hamman
- Knockout of the Night: Shane Carwin
- Submission of the Night: Kurt Pellegrino

== Television rating ==
The preliminary bouts shown on Spike TV at 9 pm EST drew a series-low of 1.2 million viewers, and coincided with the Elite Eight round of the NCAA basketball tournament.

== See also ==
- Ultimate Fighting Championship
- List of UFC champions
- List of UFC events
- 2010 in UFC
