= Jason Dent =

American mixed martial arts fighter

- Born: June 12, 1980 (age 46); Madison, Ohio, United States
- Other names: Dynamite
- Height: 5 ft 9 in (1.75 m)
- Weight: 155 lb (70 kg; 11.1 st)
- Division: Welterweight; Lightweight; Featherweight
- Team: GriffonRawl MMA Academy
- Rank: 2nd degree black belt in Karate; Black Belt in Brazilian Jiu-Jitsu from Coral Belt George Pereira
- Years active: 2003-2012

Mixed martial arts record
- Total: 35
- Wins: 22
- By knockout: 3
- By submission: 19
- Losses: 13
- By knockout: 3
- By submission: 2
- By decision: 8

Other information
- Mixed martial arts record from Sherdog

Jason William Dent (born June 12, 1980) is a retired American mixed martial artist. A professional from 2003 until 2012, he fought in the UFC, King of the Cage, and was a competitor on SpikeTV's The Ultimate Fighter: United States vs. United Kingdom.

== Background ==
Dent's training in martial arts began at age 13 with karate. Just before earning his black belt he moved onto Muay Thai and Brazilian jiu-jitsu.

== Mixed martial arts career ==
=== Early career ===
Dent made his professional MMA debut at Extreme Combat Challenge's Assault event on May 31, 2003, where he defeated Tim Newland with a triangle choke. He won his first professional championship a few months later at Next Level Fighting's first event on September 13, 2003. Once again, using a triangle choke, Dent defeated Nick Spencer for the NLF Lightweight Championship.

=== Ultimate Fighting Championship ===
He fought in a number of other local events and was eventually offered a chance to fight in a UFC match. In his UFC debut at UFC 63, Dent lost by unanimous decision to Roger Huerta. He was given second chance with a match against Gleison Tibau at UFC 68 which he lost by unanimous decision. Having lost both matches, Dent was cut from the UFC roster.

=== The Ultimate Fighter ===
Dent went back to the local MMA circuit and won five of his next six fights winning three championships along the way. He tried out for The Ultimate Fighter: United States vs. United Kingdom and was accepted. In the preliminary elimination round, he defeated Robert Browning, securing himself a spot in The Ultimate Fighter house. In episode eight, Dent defeated Team UK lightweight Jeff Lawson by Anaconda Choke in the second round, earning him a spot in the semi-finals. Dent lost by decision in the semifinals to Ross Pearson.

Dent won his post TUF fight against Cameron Dollar by submission in the first round due to an anaconda choke. The fight was at the TUF 9 Finale and Dent was awarded the Submission of the Night bonus for the choke.

Dent faced George Sotiropoulos on November 21, 2009 at UFC 106. Dent fought George on the Prelim card, the fight started off with an exchange where both fighters were engaging but after some time Sotiropoulos took down Dent and controlled him on the ground for the duration of round one. At the start of round two, Dent once again got taken down while Sotiropoulos was working for a kimura, but was unable to lock it in. While still holding Dent's arm he instead went for an armbar which finished the fight in the second round.

Dent was released from the UFC for the second time after his loss at UFC 106.

=== Post-UFC ===
With his latest stint in the UFC now behind him, Dent took a fight with NAAFS Middleweight Champion Chris Lozano at a catchweight of 170 pounds for the NAAFS Superfight Title. Despite suffering a broken arm sustained from blocking a kick in the 1st round, Dent traded shots with Lozano for four full rounds before the fight was ended. He returned to defend his NAAFS Lightweight belt against the Interim Champion, Bellator Featherweight Tournament finalist Daniel Mason-Straus more than a year later. While Dent again traded shots with his opponent throughout, he lost a decision on all three judges' scorecards.

Based on research by an MMA writer Dent owns the record for most career submissions in MMA for a UFC veteran from Ohio.

== Personal life ==
Dent owns the GriffonRawl MMA Academy in Mentor, Ohio, and previously hosted an MMA oriented radio talk show on WWGK Radio (AM 1540 KNR2) in Cleveland.

== Championships and accomplishments ==
- Extreme Fighting Challenge
  - EFC Lightweight Championship (One time)
- International Fighting & Boxing League
  - IFBL Lightweight Championship (One time)
  - IFBL Welterweight Championship (One time)
- North American Allied Fighting Championship
  - NAAFS Lightweight Championship (One time)
- Next Level Fighting
  - NLF Lightweight Championship (One time)
- Ultimate Fighting Championship
  - Fight of the Night (One time) vs. Roger Huerta
  - Submission of the Night (One time) vs. Cameron Dollar

== Mixed martial arts record ==
Professional record breakdown
35 matches	22 wins	13 losses
By knockout	3	2
By submission	19	2
By decision	0	9

Res.	Record	Opponent	Method	Event	Date	Round	Time	Location	Notes
Loss	22–13	Rustam Khabilov	Decision (unanimous)	Pure MMA: Next Episode	May 12, 2012	3	5:00	Wilkes Barre, Pennsylvania, United States	Catchweight (160 lb) bout.
Win	22–12	Paul Bird	Submission (armbar)	World War Fighting Championship 6	April 7, 2012	2	3:19	Clive, Iowa	
Loss	21–12	Daniel Mason-Straus	Decision (unanimous)	NAAFS: Caged Fury 15	October 15, 2011	5	5:00	Cleveland, Ohio, United States	
Loss	21–11	Chris Lozano	TKO (retirement)	NAAFS: Fight Night in the Flats 6	June 5, 2010	4	5:00	Cleveland, Ohio, United States	
Loss	21–10	George Sotiropoulos	Submission (armbar)	UFC 106	November 21, 2009	2	4:36	Las Vegas, Nevada, United States	
Win	21–9	Cameron Dollar	Submission (anaconda choke)	The Ultimate Fighter: United States vs. United Kingdom Finale	June 20, 2009	1	4:46	Las Vegas, Nevada, United States	Won Submission of the Night Honors
Win	20–9	Matt Shaw	Submission (americana)	IFBL: Fight Night 13	September 20, 2008	2	3:41	Niles, Ohio, United States	Welterweight bout; won the IFBL Welterweight Championship.
Win	19–9	Nick Sorg	Submission (armbar)	GFS: Fight Nite in the Flats IV	June 7, 2008	2	4:33	Cleveland, Ohio, United States	Won the NAAFS Lightweight Championship.
Win	18–9	Harris Sarmiento	Submission (anaconda choke)	IFBL: Fight Night 10	December 15, 2007	5	1:49	Niles, Ohio, United States	Won the IFBL Lightweight Championship.
Loss	17–9	Torrance Taylor	Decision (split)	NAAFS: Caged Fury 3	November 3, 2007	5	5:00	Cleveland, Ohio, United States	For the NAAFS Lightweight Championship.
Win	17–8	Israel Giron	Submission (guillotine choke)	EC: Fights	July 21, 2007	2	1:47	Monterrey, Mexico	
Win	16–8	Luke Spencer	TKO (punches)	Superior Fight Night 3	July 21, 2007	2	2:55	Cleveland Ohio, United States	
Win	15–8	Mike Bogner	Submission (anaconda choke)	NAAFS: Fight Night in the Flats 3	June 9, 2007	1	0:58	Cleveland, Ohio, United States	
Loss	14–8	Gleison Tibau	Decision (unanimous)	UFC 68	March 3, 2007	3	5:00	Columbus, Ohio, United States	
Loss	14–7	Roger Huerta	Decision (unanimous)	UFC 63: Hughes vs. Penn	September 23, 2006	3	5:00	Anaheim, California, United States	Fight of the Night.
Win	14–6	Kolo Koka	Submission (armbar)	Icon Sport: Mayhem vs Lawler	September 2, 2006	3	1:07	Honolulu, Hawaii, United States	
Win	13–6	Luke Spencer	Submission (triangle choke)	NAAFS: Fight Night in the Flats 2	June 10, 2006	3	0:43	Cleveland, Ohio, United States	
Win	12–6	Joe Voisin	Submission (guillotine choke)	KOTC: Drop Zone	March 18, 2006	1	4:50	Mt. Pleasant, Michigan, United States	Welterweight bout.
Win	11–6	Clint Zeedyk	TKO (punches)	NAAFS: Caged Vengeance 1	February 18, 2006	2	1:40	Cleveland, Ohio, United States	
Loss	10–6	Brandon Garner	Submission (triangle choke)	KOTC: Shock and Awe	October 1, 2005	1	2:49	Alberta, Canada	Welterweight bout.
Win	10–5	Josh Souder	TKO (cut)	GFS: Fight Night in the Flats 1	September 17, 2005	1	1:57	Cleveland, Ohio, United States	
Win	9–5	Primo Luciano	TKO (submission to punches)	Extreme Fighting Challenge 11	March 5, 2005	1	N/A	Columbus, Ohio, United States	Return to Lightweight; defended the EFC Lightweight Championship.
Loss	8–5	Paulo Dantas	Decision (unanimous)	KOTC 48: Payback	February 25, 2005	2	5:00	Cleveland, Ohio, United States	Featherweight debut.
Win	8–4	Joe Voisin	Submission (triangle choke)	ECC: Ho Ho Ho KO	December 18, 2004	2	1:17	Muncie, Indiana, United States	Welterweight bout.
Loss	7–4	Jeff Curran	Decision (unanimous)	Xtreme Fighting Organization 3	October 2, 2004	3	5:00	McHenry, Illinois, United States	
Loss	7–3	Ryan Schultz	TKO (punches)	APEX: Genesis	September 5, 2004	1	2:00	Quebec, Canada	Return to Lightweight.
Win	7–2	Tom Kirk	Submission (triangle choke)	ECC: Brawl at the Hall	June 26, 2004	3	2:43	Muncie, Indiana, United States	
Win	6–2	D'Angelo Nickle	TKO (submission to punches)	Northern Kentucky FC	May 29, 2004	1	N/A	Covington, Kentucky, United States	
Loss	5–2	Tetsuji Kato	Decision (unanimous)	SuperBrawl 35	April 16, 2004	3	5:00	Honolulu, Hawaii, United States	
Win	5–1	Matt Brady	Submission (armbar)	KOTC 34: Ohio	February 28, 2004	1	N/A	Canton, Ohio, United States	
Win	4–1	Davy Gibson	Submission (armbar)	Extreme Combat Challenge	February 7, 2004	1	N/A	Anderson, Indiana, United States	
Win	3–1	Billy Rush	TKO (submission to punches)	International Combat Events 5	September 13, 2003	1	3:49	Middletown, Ohio, United States	Welterweight debut.
Win	2–1	Nick Spencer	Submission (triangle choke)	Next Level Fighting	September 13, 2003	3	2:20	Steubenville, Ohio, United States	Won the Next Level Fighting Lightweight Championship.
Loss	1–1	Antoine Skinner	Decision (unanimous)	ECC: Mayhem in Muncie	August 23, 2003	3	5:00	Muncie, Indiana, United States	
Win	1–0	Tim Newland	Submission (triangle choke)	ECC: Assault	May 31, 2003	3	3:15	Anderson, Indiana, United States	
