= Elimination Chamber (2021) =

WWE pay-per-view and livestreaming event

- Promotional poster featuring Drew McIntyre, Roman Reigns, and the Elimination Chamber structure
- Promotion: WWE
- Brand(s): Raw; SmackDown
- Date: February 21, 2021
- City: St. Petersburg, Florida
- Venue: WWE ThunderDome at Tropicana Field
- Attendance: 0 (behind closed doors) (Note: The event was held without a paying audience due to the COVID-19 pandemic in the United States, though it featured a live crowd of virtual fans via WWE's ThunderDome viewing experience.)

WWE event chronology
← Previous; NXT TakeOver: Vengeance Day	Next → Fastlane

Elimination Chamber chronology
← Previous; 2020	Next → 2022

The 2021 Elimination Chamber (known as No Escape in Germany) was a professional wrestling pay-per-view (PPV) and livestreaming event produced by WWE, held for wrestlers from the promotion's main roster brands, Raw and SmackDown. It was the 11th Elimination Chamber event and due to the COVID-19 pandemic, it took place on February 21, 2021, from the WWE ThunderDome, a bio-secure bubble that at the time was hosted at Tropicana Field in St. Petersburg, Florida. The event centered on the Elimination Chamber match, a type of roofed steel cage that surrounds the ring and ringside area with no disqualifications; the objective is to eliminate all other opponents either by pinfall or submission with championship implications at stake.

Seven matches were contested at the event, including one on the Kickoff pre-show. There were two Elimination Chamber matches on the card, both of which were men's matches with one each for Raw and SmackDown. In an impromptu main event, The Miz cashed in his Money in the Bank contract and defeated Drew McIntyre to win the WWE Championship after McIntyre had just retained the title in Raw's Elimination Chamber match. In the opening bout, Daniel Bryan won SmackDown's Elimination Chamber match to earn an immediate Universal Championship match against Roman Reigns, who retained the title against Bryan. In another prominent match, Riddle defeated John Morrison and defending champion Bobby Lashley to win Raw's United States Championship. This was the first and only Elimination Chamber event to not feature a women's Elimination Chamber match since its debut in 2018.

This was WWE's first PPV event to livestream on SonyLIV in India as the Indian version of the WWE Network merged under SonyLIV the same day as Elimination Chamber. This would also be the final PPV event that was available on the standalone American version of the WWE Network before the launch of Peacock's WWE channel in the United States on March 18; following a brief transitional period, the standalone version of the American WWE Network shut down on April 4. This was also the last Elimination Chamber event to be held in the United States until 2026.

== Production ==
=== Background ===
Elimination Chamber is a professional wrestling event first produced by WWE in 2010. It has been held every year since, except in 2016, generally in February. It was originally broadcast exclusively via pay-per-view (PPV) before it began simultaneously livestreaming on the WWE Network in 2015. The concept of the event is that one or two main event matches are contested inside the Elimination Chamber, either with championships or future opportunities at championships at stake. Announced on January 17, 2021, the 11th Elimination Chamber event was scheduled for February 21, 2021, returning the event to its regular February slot after the 2020 event was held in March, and it featured wrestlers from the Raw and SmackDown brand divisions. This would also be WWE's first event to livestream on SonyLIV in India as the Indian version of the WWE Network merged under SonyLIV the same day as Elimination Chamber.

The Elimination Chamber match is an elimination-based match contested in a type of large roofed steel cage that surrounds the wrestling ring with an elevated platform around the ring. Within the Chamber are four inner pods, one behind each ring post. The match is contested by six participants. Two wrestlers start the match, while the other four are held within each inner pod with one selected randomly to enter the match at regular intervals, which continues until all four have been released. The objective is to eliminate all other opponents by pinfall or submission, and there are no disqualifications or count-outs.

In 2011 and since 2013, the show has been promoted as "No Escape" in Germany as it was feared that the name "Elimination Chamber" may remind people of the gas chambers used during the Holocaust; it was promoted as "No Way Out" in 2010 and 2012.

==== Impact of the COVID-19 pandemic ====
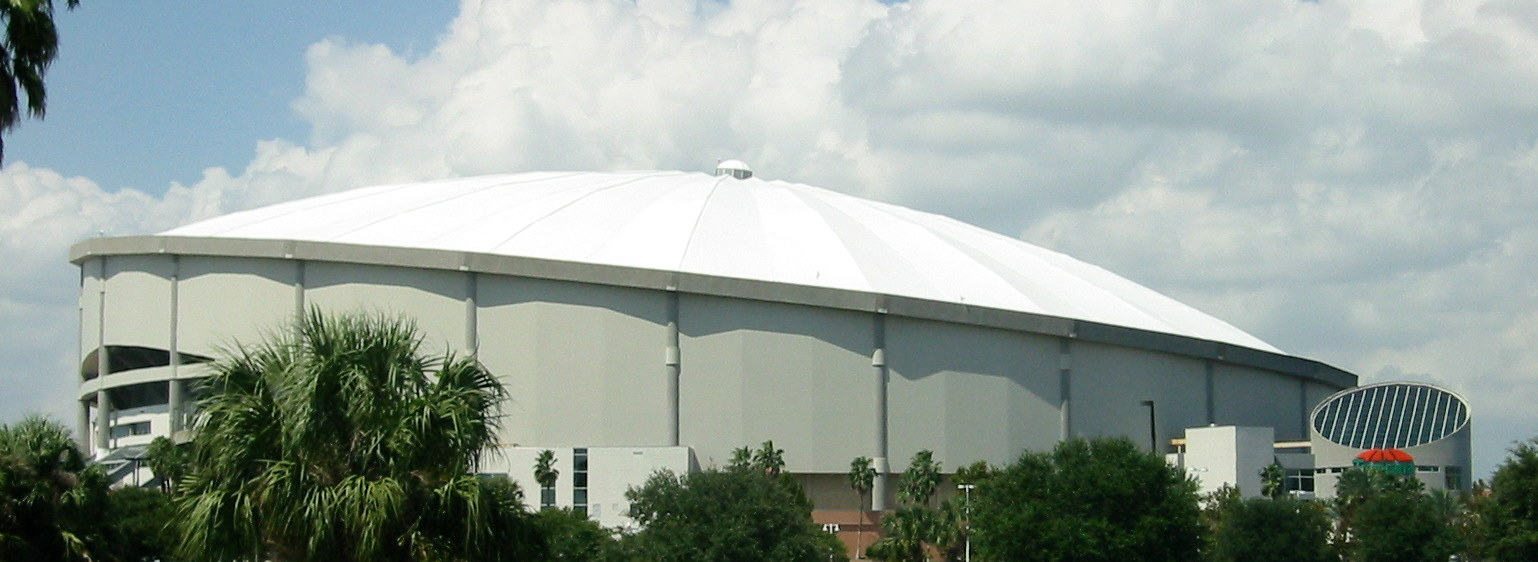
Due to the COVID-19 pandemic, the 11th Elimination Chamber event was produced by way of a bio-secure bubble called the WWE ThunderDome, which at the time was hosted at Tropicana Field in St. Petersburg, Florida.

As a result of the COVID-19 pandemic that began affecting the industry in mid-March 2020, WWE had to present the majority of its programming from a behind closed doors set. Initially, Raw and SmackDown's shows were done at the WWE Performance Center in Orlando, Florida. A limited number of Performance Center trainees and friends and family members of the wrestlers were later utilized to serve as the live audience. In late August, these programs were moved to a bio-secure bubble called the WWE ThunderDome. The select live audience was no longer utilized as the bubble allowed fans to attend the events virtually for free and be seen on the nearly 1,000 LED boards within the arena. Additionally, the ThunderDome utilized various special effects to further enhance wrestlers' entrances, and arena audio was mixed with that of the chants from the virtual fans. After being hosted at Orlando's Amway Center, the ThunderDome was relocated to Tropicana Field in St. Petersburg, Florida in December.

=== Storylines ===
The event comprised seven matches, including one on the Kickoff pre-show, that resulted from scripted storylines. Results were predetermined by WWE's writers on the Raw and SmackDown brands, while storylines were produced on WWE's weekly television shows, Monday Night Raw and Friday Night SmackDown.

After Sheamus was drafted to the Raw brand in the 2020 WWE Draft, he re-established his old friendship with WWE Champion Drew McIntyre. However, on the February 1, 2021, episode of Raw, Sheamus turned on McIntyre, declaring that he was not his friend and wanted the WWE Championship. Later, McIntyre accepted Sheamus's challenge for a one-on-one match. The following week, however, WWE officials Adam Pearce and Shane McMahon announced that McIntyre would defend the WWE Championship against five former WWE Champions in an Elimination Chamber match at Elimination Chamber, which included Sheamus, as well as Jeff Hardy, AJ Styles, Randy Orton, and Mr. Money in the Bank The Miz. After a heated confrontation with McIntyre during a "Miz TV" segment the following week, Miz removed himself from Raw's Elimination Chamber match. Backstage, The New Day's Kofi Kingston confronted Pearce about the vacant spot due to being a former WWE Champion. Miz also confronted Pearce, wanting to give his vacant spot to his tag team partner John Morrison, who despite not being a former WWE Champion, Miz reminded Pearce and Kingston that Morrison was a former ECW World Champion. Pearce then scheduled a match between Kingston and Miz where if Miz won, Morrison would take his place, but if Kingston won, he would be in the match. Kingston won the ensuing match. Later that night, a gauntlet match was held between the six Elimination Chamber match participants to determine who would enter the chamber last. Sheamus won by last eliminating McIntyre.

In December 2020, Riddle began a feud with United States Champion Bobby Lashley. On the January 4 episode of Raw, Riddle defeated Lashley in a non-title match to earn a title match the following week, however, Riddle lost to Lashley. On the January 25 episode, Riddle earned another title opportunity against Lashley by defeating Lashley's fellow Hurt Business stablemates in a gauntlet match. Riddle received his title match the following week on Raw where Riddle would defeat Lashley by disqualification, but did not win the championship as titles do not change hands by disqualification unless stipulated. The following week, Riddle confronted Keith Lee, where he stated that he needed to win the United States Championship. Lee, however, took issue with Riddle losing his title matches and then stated that it was time for someone else to step up to Lashley. Lee then stated that he would defeat Lashley and he could also beat Riddle. Later that night, Lee defeated Riddle. Following the match, Lashley attacked Lee and Riddle. Lashley was subsequently scheduled to defend the United States Championship against Lee and Riddle at Elimination Chamber. The day of the event, however, Lee was pulled from the match due to a reported injury. A fatal four-way match was then scheduled for the Kickoff pre-show between Ricochet, Elias, John Morrison, and Mustafa Ali to fill Lee's vacated spot in the triple threat match for the U.S. title.

On the February 12 episode of SmackDown, WWE official Adam Pearce scheduled Universal Champion Roman Reigns to defend his title in an Elimination Chamber match at Elimination Chamber. However, Reigns's special counsel, Paul Heyman, pointed out that Reigns's contract only stated that Reigns had to defend the championship at the event, but not necessarily inside of the eponymous structure. To Pearce's displeasure, it was then decided that the winner of SmackDown's Elimination Chamber match at the event would get an immediate championship match against Reigns that same night. Pearce named Reigns's cousin, Jey Uso, and Kevin Owens, who Reigns defeated at the Royal Rumble in a Last Man Standing match, as the first two participants for the match, with the other four spots determined by qualification matches that same episode. Baron Corbin and Sami Zayn then qualified by defeating Rey Mysterio and Dominik Mysterio in a tag team match, and later, Cesaro and Daniel Bryan defeated SmackDown Tag Team Champions Dolph Ziggler and Robert Roode in a non-title tag team match to fill the final two spots.

On the February 12 episode of SmackDown, while women's Royal Rumble match winner Bianca Belair and SmackDown Women's Champion Sasha Banks were discussing who Belair should pick as her WrestleMania opponent, they were interrupted by WWE Women's Tag Team Champions Nia Jax and Shayna Baszler. The two teams brawled, with Banks and Belair standing tall. The following week, Banks and Belair teamed with Reginald to defeat Jax, Baszler, and Bayley when Reginald pinned Jax. Later that night, Jax and Baszler were scheduled to defend the WWE Women's Tag Team Championship against Banks and Belair at Elimination Chamber.

=== Canceled match ===
In early January, Lacey Evans aligned herself with Ric Flair in an attempt to taunt Ric's daughter, Charlotte Flair. This would continue for several weeks, including Evans and Ric interrupting Charlotte's matches, which included causing Charlotte and Asuka to lose the WWE Women's Tag Team Championship on the Royal Rumble Kickoff pre-show. On the February 8 episode of Raw, Evans stated that she respected Ric and his legacy, unlike his daughter. Charlotte came out and lambasted Evans for using her dad to move forward. Evans then stated that she had her sights on the Raw Women's Championship and challenged Charlotte to a match, with the stipulation that if Evans won, she would earn a shot at the title. Evans subsequently defeated Charlotte by disqualification to earn a Raw Women's Championship match against Asuka at Elimination Chamber. The following week during a tag team match that featured Charlotte and Asuka against Evans and Peyton Royce, Evans revealed that she was legitimately pregnant. Dave Meltzer of the Wrestling Observer Newsletter confirmed that their match would not be taking place.

== Event ==
Other on-screen personnel
Role:	Name:
English commentators	Michael Cole (SmackDown)
English commentators	Corey Graves (SmackDown)
English commentators	Tom Phillips (Raw)
English commentators	Samoa Joe (Raw)
English commentators	Byron Saxton (Raw)
Spanish commentators	Carlos Cabrera
Spanish commentators	Marcelo Rodriguez
Ring announcers	Greg Hamilton (SmackDown)
Ring announcers	Mike Rome (Raw)
Referees	Danilo Anfibio
Referees	Jason Ayers
Referees	Shawn Bennett
Referees	Jessika Carr
Referees	John Cone
Referees	Dan Engler
Referees	Darrick Moore
Referees	Eddie Orengo
Referees	Chad Patton
Referees	Ryan Tran
Referees	Rod Zapata
Interviewer	Kayla Braxton
Pre-show panel	Charly Caruso
Pre-show panel	Booker T
Pre-show panel	John "Bradshaw" Layfield
Pre-show panel	Peter Rosenberg

=== Pre-show ===
During the Elimination Chamber Kickoff pre-show, Ricochet, Elias, John Morrison, and Mustafa Ali (accompanied by his Retribution stablemates Mace, T-Bar, and Slapjack) competed in a fatal four-way match for the vacant spot in the United States Championship match on the main card. After an evenly contested match between the four competitors, Morrison performed a roll-up pin on Ali, who was distracted by his stablemates attacking Ricochet, to win the match and advance to the United States Championship triple threat match.

Also during the pre-show, it was announced that due to Lacey Evans' legitimate pregnancy, Asuka would defend her Raw Women's Championship against a different opponent on the main card. However, this never occurred.

=== Preliminary matches ===
The actual event opened with SmackDown's Elimination Chamber match between Cesaro, Daniel Bryan, Jey Uso, Kevin Owens, Baron Corbin, and Sami Zayn with the winner receiving an immediate Universal Championship match against Roman Reigns. Bryan and Cesaro started the match. Corbin was the third entrant, followed by Zayn. Corbin was eliminated by Cesaro after submitting to the Sharpshooter. Owens entered fifth and Jey entered last. Owens eliminated Zayn after a Stunner. Jey trapped Owens' arm in the main door of the Chamber and performed multiple Superkicks before eliminating Owens with an Uso Splash. After a back-and-forth battle between Bryan and Cesaro, Jey eliminated Cesaro after an Uso Splash. In the end, Bryan countered Jey and performed the Running Knee on Jey to win the match.

Following the match, the Chamber structure lifted above the ring and Roman Reigns (accompanied by Paul Heyman) made his entrance for his immediate Universal Championship defense against Daniel Bryan. Bryan applied the Yes Lock on Reigns, who escaped by performing multiple forearm smashes. Reigns applied the Guillotine Choke on Bryan, who passed out, thus Reigns retained the title by technical submission. Following the match, men's Royal Rumble match winner Edge appeared and performed a Spear on Reigns. He then pointed at the WrestleMania sign and signified that he had chosen to challenge Reigns for the Universal Championship at WrestleMania 37, which was later confirmed.

Backstage, The Miz interrupted 24/7 Champion Bad Bunny, accompanied by Damian Priest. Miz questioned why Bad Bunny was present, who stated that he was the 24/7 Champion. Bad Bunny then mocked Miz for not being a champion before slapping him.

Next, Bobby Lashley (accompanied by MVP) defended the United States Championship against Riddle and John Morrison. In the end, Riddle attacked Lashley with MVP's crutch. While Lashley was outside the ring, Riddle performed the Bro-Derek on Morrison to win the title.

In the penultimate match, Nia Jax and Shayna Baszler defended the WWE Women's Tag Team Championship against women's Royal Rumble match winner Bianca Belair and SmackDown Women's Champion Sasha Banks. In the end, Reginald came to the ring and handed a champagne bottle to Banks to use as a weapon while the referee was distracted. This backfired though, as while Banks was distracted by Reginald, Jax performed a Samoan Drop on Banks to retain the titles for herself and Baszler.

Backstage, MVP was shown talking to The Miz, who had his Money in the Bank briefcase in hand.

=== Main event ===
In the main event, Drew McIntyre defended the WWE Championship against Jeff Hardy, Kofi Kingston, AJ Styles (accompanied by his bodyguard Omos), Randy Orton, and Sheamus in Raw's Elimination Chamber match. Hardy and Orton started the match. Later on in the match, McIntyre entered third. Kingston entered fourth and he eliminated Orton with a roll-up, after which Randy then got enraged and performed two RKO's: one on Kofi and one on Hardy. While the referee was dealing with Orton, Omos broke open the pod Styles was locked up in from the outside, allowing Styles to enter early through the Chamber's main door. After Styles scrambled his way through the chamber's main door, he did not notice that WWE official Adam Pearce ejected Omos from ringside and forced the Nigerian Giant to leave. Sheamus was the last to enter the match. Sheamus then eliminated Kingston with a Brogue Kick. After Hardy performed the Swanton Bomb on Styles, McIntyre eliminated Hardy with a Claymore Kick. Styles eliminated Sheamus after a Phenomenal Forearm. As Styles then attempted a Phenomenal Forearm on McIntyre, McIntyre caught Styles in mid-air with a Claymore Kick to retain the title.

Following the match, as the Chamber structure was lifted above the ring, a frustrated Bobby Lashley appeared and with viciousness, he performed a Spear on McIntyre, attacked him at ringside after throwing Drew out of the ring itself, and applied the Hurt Lock on McIntyre after throwing him back in the ring. Then, following the attack, Miz ran to the ring and cashed in his Money in the Bank contract, while Lashley departed backstage. After a nearfall, Miz performed the Skull Crushing Finale on McIntyre to win the WWE Championship for a second time, last winning it in 2010, which was also via a Money in the Bank cash-in. This also made Miz the first two-time Grand Slam Champion in WWE history.

== Aftermath ==
On January 25, 2021, WWE announced that the WWE Network would become exclusively distributed by Peacock in the United States as part of a new agreement with NBCUniversal, which at the time aired Raw and NXT on the USA Network. On March 18, the WWE Network became a premium channel under Peacock, with premium subscribers to the service receiving access to the WWE Network at no additional cost. As a result, Elimination Chamber was the final pay-per-view to be available to livestream on the American version of the WWE Network before the launch of Peacock's WWE Network channel. After a brief transitional period, the standalone version of the WWE Network in the U.S. shut down on April 4, with future events only available via Peacock's WWE Network channel and traditional PPV. This did not affect other countries at the time, which maintained the separate WWE Network service distributed by WWE. This also marked the last Elimination Chamber to be held in the United States until 2026.

=== Raw ===
The following night on Raw, new WWE Champion The Miz celebrated his win with his tag team partner, John Morrison. Miz bragged about his victory, dismissing his critics as "losers" and "haters", only for Bobby Lashley and MVP to interrupt. Lashley stated that Miz only won the title because of him and then stated that he owes Lashley, who then gave Miz one hour to make a decision. Later on the show, Lashley came out for his supposed title match with Miz. However, Braun Strowman interrupted. Strowman took issue about not being part of Raw's Elimination Chamber match; WWE official Adam Pearce reiterated that the Chamber match was for former WWE Champions only, which Strowman was not. An angered Strowman then said he would face Lashley. Shane McMahon came out. He liked Strowman's idea of him facing Lashley and said that Lashley would receive his title match next week against Miz and also scheduled a match between Strowman and Lashley, with the stipulation that if Strowman won, he would be added to the title match. Lashley defeated Strowman in the main event, thus Lashley's title match remained a singles match. The following week, after repeated attempts by Miz to get out of the title defense, Lashley defeated Miz in a lumberjack match to win the WWE Championship. He defeated The Miz in a rematch on the following Raw. On the March 15 episode, it was confirmed that Lashley would defend the championship against McIntyre at WrestleMania 37.

Also on the following Raw, new United States Champion Riddle faced John Morrison, who Riddle had pinned to win the title, in a non-title match. Riddle subsequently defeated Morrison.

In a follow-up to the Lacey Evans and Charlotte Flair angle, Charlotte told her father Ric Flair that she cannot focus on her matches, as she and Raw Women's Champion Asuka lost a non-title tag team match against the WWE Women's Tag Team Champions Nia Jax and Shayna Baszler earlier that night, also seemingly causing the breakup of her team with Asuka. Ric claimed that he was not the father of Lacey Evans' baby and that he was only trying to help motivate Evans just as he had motivated Charlotte to become one of the all-time greats. Charlotte stated that Ric was still trying to be the Nature Boy and told him that she was thankful for the opportunities that he provided her, but he needed to leave and let her be herself. The following week, Charlotte set her sights on Asuka and the Raw Women's Championship, wanting to face Asuka for the title at WrestleMania 37, but that did not happen due to Flair testing positive for COVID-19, removing her from the WrestleMania title picture.

Drew McIntyre returned to Raw the following week. He addressed the fact that he successfully defended the WWE Championship in Raw's Elimination Chamber match, but he was not prepared for the ambush by Bobby Lashley and subsequently The Miz cashing in the Money in the Bank contract to win the title. McIntyre declared that he would regain the WWE Championship and main event WrestleMania 37. McIntyre then turned his attention to his old friend Sheamus and the two had their originally planned one-on-one match that night where McIntyre defeated Sheamus. A rematch the following week was contested as a No Disqualification match; however, it ended by referee stoppage. Another match between the two was scheduled for Fastlane as a No Holds Barred match.

=== SmackDown ===
On the following SmackDown, Universal Champion, Roman Reigns, accompanied by Paul Heyman and Jey Uso, one half of the Usos, stated that Edge ruined his victory over Daniel Bryan. He then gave Edge an opportunity to back out from choosing to challenge him at WrestleMania 37. Reigns stated that he did not want to hurt him as Edge has a family. Bryan then came out and mocked Reigns for defending his championship against him right after he had won SmackDown's Elimination Chamber match. Bryan then questioned Reigns as to why he defended the title in the second match of the event, instead of in the main event. Bryan then challenged Reigns to another championship match at Fastlane. Jey interjected and stated Bryan would have to earn another opportunity like everyone else and then challenged Bryan to a match. Later, Edge confronted WWE presenter and former WWE wrestler, Adam Pearce, backstage, taking issue that Bryan would receive a title shot before him, as Edge won the Royal Rumble match, which Bryan also competed in. Pearce decided that Bryan would only get a Universal Championship match at Fastlane if he could defeat Jey in their match that night. Edge later confronted Bryan backstage where Bryan stated he believed he had a better chance at defeating Reigns than Edge did, however, Edge reminded Bryan that if Bryan were to defeat Reigns for the Universal Championship, Bryan would be facing Edge at WrestleMania 37. In the main event, however, both Bryan and Jey's match ended in a double countout. A Steel Cage match was contested between the two the following week where if Bryan won, he would earn the title shot at Fastlane, but if Jey won, Bryan would have to acknowledge Reigns as the "Tribal Chief" and "Head of the Table"; Bryan defeated Jey. After the official contract signing for the match on the March 12 episode, a match between Edge and Jey was scheduled for the following week to determine who would be the special guest enforcer during the championship match, which was won by Edge. At Fastlane, Reigns retained after Edge attacked both men with a steel chair. On the following SmackDown, it was announced that Reigns would defend the Universal Championship against Edge and Bryan in a triple threat match at WrestleMania 37.

Also on SmackDown, women's Royal Rumble winner Bianca Belair officially announced that she would challenge Sasha Banks for the SmackDown Women's Championship at WrestleMania 37. Before WrestleMania 37, Banks and Belair faced Nia Jax and Shayna Baszler in a rematch for the WWE Women's Tag Team Championship at Fastlane, but were unsuccessful again. Banks also had a successful title defense against Jax on the March 19 episode of SmackDown.

== Results ==
No.	Results	Stipulations	Times
1^{P}	John Morrison defeated Elias, Mustafa Ali (with Mace, T-Bar, and Slapjack), and Ricochet by pinfall	Fatal four-way match to qualify for the triple threat match for the WWE United States Championship on the main card	7:10
2	Daniel Bryan defeated Cesaro, Jey Uso, Kevin Owens, King Corbin, and Sami Zayn	Elimination Chamber match for an immediate WWE Universal Championship match	34:20
3	Roman Reigns (c) (with Paul Heyman) defeated Daniel Bryan by technical submission	Singles match for the WWE Universal Championship	1:35
4	Riddle defeated Bobby Lashley (c) (with MVP) and John Morrison by pinfall	Triple threat match for the WWE United States Championship	8:40
5	Nia Jax and Shayna Baszler (c) defeated Bianca Belair and Sasha Banks by pinfall	Tag team match for the WWE Women's Tag Team Championship	9:35
6	Drew McIntyre (c) defeated AJ Styles (with Omos), Jeff Hardy, Kofi Kingston, Randy Orton, and Sheamus	Elimination Chamber match for the WWE Championship	31:10
7	The Miz defeated Drew McIntyre (c) by pinfall	Singles match for the WWE Championship; This was Miz's Money in the Bank cash-in match.	0:30
(c) / – the champion(s) heading into the match; P / – the match was broadcast on the pre-show

=== SmackDown Elimination Chamber match ===
Eliminated	Wrestler	Entered	Eliminated by	Method	Time
1	King Corbin	3	Cesaro	Sharpshooter	17:45
2	Sami Zayn	4	Kevin Owens	Stunner	25:30
3	Kevin Owens	5	Jey Uso	Frog Splash	26:50
4	Cesaro	1	Jey Uso	Frog Splash	32:50
5	Jey Uso	6	Daniel Bryan	Running Knee	34:20
Winner	Daniel Bryan	2			

=== Raw Elimination Chamber match ===
Eliminated	Wrestler	Entered	Eliminated by	Method	Time
1	Randy Orton	2	Kofi Kingston	Roll-Up	8:55
2	Kofi Kingston	4	Sheamus	Brogue Kick	23:48
3	Jeff Hardy	1	Drew McIntyre	Claymore	25:32
4	Sheamus	6	AJ Styles	Phenomenal Forearm	30:25
5	AJ Styles	5	Drew McIntyre	Claymore	31:22
Winner	Drew McIntyre (c)	3			
