= Nick Osipczak =

English mixed martial arts fighter

- Born: Nicholas Dominic Osipczak; 30 December 1984 (age 41); London, England
- Other names: Supernova
- Nationality: American, British
- Height: 6 ft 3 in (191 cm)
- Weight: 170 lb (77 kg; 12 st 2 lb)
- Division: Welterweight
- Reach: 76 in (193 cm)
- Style: Tai chi, Brazilian jiu-jitsu
- Stance: Orthodox
- Fighting out of: London, England
- Team: Yang-style tai chi Raised Spirit Internal Arts

Mixed martial arts record
- Total: 9
- Wins: 6
- By knockout: 2
- By submission: 4
- By decision: 0
- Losses: 3
- By decision: 3
- Draws: 0

Other information
- Mixed martial arts record from Sherdog

Nicholas Dominic Osipczak (born 30 December 1984) is an American-English professional mixed martial artist, most famous for his fights and wins in the welterweight division of the UFC. He was also a cast member of Spike TV's The Ultimate Fighter: United States vs. United Kingdom. Nick is also known for being one of the first people in history to represent the art of tai chi in Mixed Martial Arts competitions.

== Background ==
Osipczak was born in London to an English father of Polish descent and an American mother of English, German, Irish and Serbian descent. He was raised in South London until his youth. He attended St. Olaves Grammar School, from which he graduated in 2003, and he then enrolled at Loughborough University and obtained a bachelor's degree in Mathematics, Accounting and Financial Management, graduating in 2007.

== Mixed martial arts career ==
At the age of 18 and while he was still attending his course at Loughborough University, Nick joined a local martial arts club, the Hung Kuen Shaolin Kung Fu Club. Being a diligent martial arts practitioner, he soon won the UK National Kung Fu Open Weight Championship. However, Nick was inspired to take up MMA after watching UFC's Ultimate Knockouts DVD, and started searching out the best places and coaches to train with up and down the United Kingdom.

For a while, Nick served as a sparring partner for some of the UK's best MMA fighters, and most notably in 2008 he was invited to be the sparring partner of Michael Bisping during his preparation for his upcoming fight against Chris Leben at UFC 89 in Birmingham, UK.

After two years of training in MMA and helping others too, Osipczak also began competing in the UK, and went undefeated in all his amateur and semi-professional bouts.

In March 2008, Nick also made his professional MMA fighting debut and offered his opponent a "winner-takes-all" bet, which his opponent initially refused. When they eventually fought, Nick won the fight in only 76 seconds, and displayed what would later be known as his "helicopter punch". The opponent for his third professional bout accepted a "winner-takes-all" deal, and Osipczak won by rear naked choke, taking his record to 3–0.

All of Nick's professional fights had been won in under two minutes and relatively easily, which helped to catch the attention of the casting crew when he auditioned for The Ultimate Fighter: United States vs. United Kingdom, while UFC's president, Dana White, was also present.

=== The Ultimate Fighter ===
Osipczak also appeared on The Ultimate Fighter: United States vs. United Kingdom. He first defeated the British MMA professional fighter Tommy Maguire by knock out in the first round in an elimination match, earning him the trip to Las Vegas, Nevada, to compete on the show. Osipczak then had his second fight against Team United States fighter Mark Miller. Osipczak defeated Miller via a second-round knockout from a powerful head kick, which was voted in the top 15 all-time TUF knock-outs.

However, Nick lost his semi-final fight against DaMarques Johnson, although Dana White called the fight one of the best fights in TUF history.

=== Ultimate Fighting Championship ===
Osipczak made his Ultimate Fighting Championship debut at The Ultimate Finale 9 on 20 June 2009, and he fought his former TUF castmate and Team United States fighter, Frank Lester in Las Vegas, Nevada. Osipczak defeated Lester by using a rear naked choke. His overall performance in that night helped him renew his contract for three more fights for the UFC.

Osipczak faced TUF 7 alumnus, Matthew Riddle on 14 November 2009 at UFC 105 in Manchester, UK. In a pre-fight interview, Osipczak stated that Riddle has no serious finishing ability and is most often than not a fighter who likes to "grind out a decision". Riddle countered the statement by saying that he considers Osipczak without considerable experience against wrestlers, which he attributed to the wider lack of wrestling training of UK MMA fighters. However, Osipczak dominated throughout the fight by showing a superior standing up and striking as well as grappling game. When Osipczak at some point fully mounted Riddle in the final round, he started a vicious ground and pound barrage of punches and elbow strikes which made the referee Mark Goddard to end the fight at 3:53 in the final round. UFC commentator Joe Rogan mentioned that this was a "huge performance by Osipczak".

Osipczak then fought Rick Story at UFC 112 in Abu Dhabi, United Arab Emirates. Osipczak lost the fight via a controversial split decision. According to MMA Fanhouse who were doing a live play-by-play from the event, "Most on press row didn't agree with the decision. Looked like Osipczak won Rounds 2 and 3." Osipczak was defeated by Greg Soto at UFC 118 in Boston, Massachusetts, after the fight went all three rounds and the judges awarded the fight to his opponent via unanimous decision. Osipczak was upset by Duane Ludwig at UFC 122 in Oberhausen, Germany, via a split decision, which again sparked some controversy.

=== Students ===
In 2011, Osipczak started running his own MMA academy in South London, the New Wave Academy, which immediately became one of the most up and coming MMA academies in London and he became a mentor to many London-based professional MMA fighters. Although he officially left his academy to two of his students in 2012, as he was aiming at having more time to further develop his martial arts knowledge and skills, he currently continues teaching some of the top British professional MMA fighters at the premises of Eddie Kone's Academy of Jiu Jitsu. In early 2014, Nick announced that he is ready to return to MMA competitions, feeling "reborn".

== Return to Mixed Martial Arts competition ==
On 27 June 2015, after almost 5 years off from competition, Nick returned to headline the inaugural Macto Championships. Held in the Arena:MK, Milton Keynes, Nick faced boxing-specialist Kyle Redfearn, and defeated him via submission (RNC) 2 minutes 4 seconds into the first round. This occasion marked the first time in history that the Internal Martial Arts (Neijia) and in particular tai chi were represented in the sport of Mixed Martial Arts. Osipczak is expected to fight again for Macto Championships, with the view to returning to the UFC, and has publicly stated he aims to win the UFC belt by 2018. Nick revealed a painting he had created the week leading up to the bout, entitled "Victory", and announced that he will be releasing a new painting to coincide with each subsequent fight. Nick used the ancient Chinese symbol known as the Bagua on his walk-out T-shirt and banner for this fight.

== Personal life ==
Nick currently lives in Oxfordshire, UK, with his partner and their son. Their son's first name is Shen, which means Spirit (神) in Chinese. His sister Alex Osipczak is an Internet personality and runs the YouTube channel 'Spencer & Alex' alongside her husband and fellow YouTuber, Spencer Carmichael-Brown. In his spare time, he enjoys reading books about Chinese philosophy and martial arts. His favourite books are Lao Tzu's Tao Te Ching and Sun Tzu's The Art of War. An avid painter, Nick was selected to be the In-House artist for one of London's top Interior Design shops, and was featured in Vice Media's documentary "Hitting the canvas with Nick Osipczak".

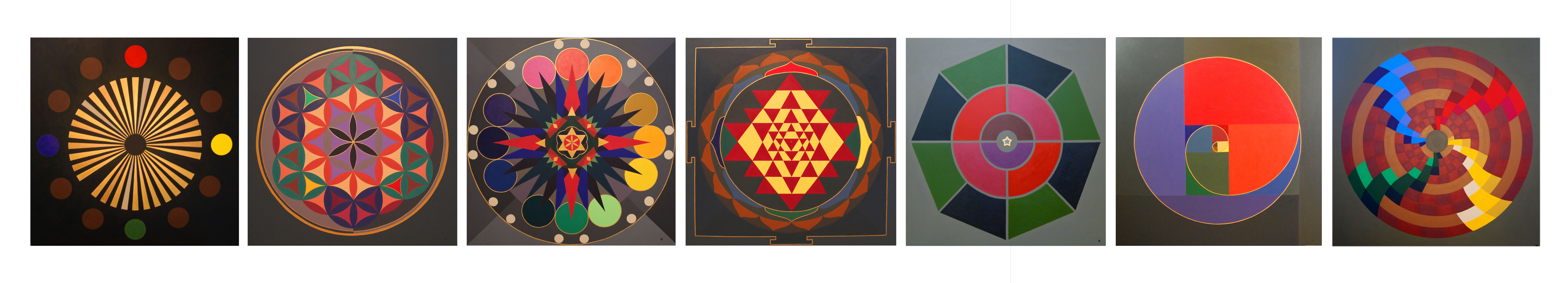
Artwork by Nick Osipczak

== Mixed martial arts record ==
Professional record breakdown
| 9 matches | 6 wins | 3 losses |
| By knockout | 2 | 0 |
| By submission | 4 | 0 |
| By decision | 0 | 3 |

| Res. | Record | Opponent | Method | Event | Date | Round | Time | Location | Notes |
|---|---|---|---|---|---|---|---|---|---|
| Win | 6–3 | Kyle Redfearn | Submission (rear-naked choke) | Macto Championships – Osipczak vs. Redfearn | 27 June 2015 | 1 | 2:04 | Milton Keynes, England | |
| Loss | 5–3 | Duane Ludwig | Decision (split) | UFC 122 | 13 November 2010 | 3 | 5:00 | Oberhausen, Germany | |
| Loss | 5–2 | Greg Soto | Decision (unanimous) | UFC 118 | 28 August 2010 | 3 | 5:00 | Boston, Massachusetts, United States | |
| Loss | 5–1 | Rick Story | Decision (split) | UFC 112 | 10 April 2010 | 3 | 5:00 | Abu Dhabi, United Arab Emirates | |
| Win | 5–0 | Matthew Riddle | TKO (punches and elbows) | UFC 105 | 14 November 2009 | 3 | 3:53 | Manchester, England | |
| Win | 4–0 | Frank Lester | Submission (rear naked choke) | TUF 9 Finale | 20 June 2009 | 1 | 3:40 | Las Vegas, Nevada, United States | |
| Win | 3–0 | Geoff Hayes | Submission (rear naked choke) | ZT 12: Fight Night 12 | 30 August 2008 | 1 | 1:32 | Brighton, East Sussex, England | |
| Win | 2–0 | Nigel Whitear | Submission (rear naked choke) | FX3: Fight Night 8 | 22 June 2008 | 1 | 1:55 | Reading, Berkshire, England | |
| Win | 1–0 | Brendan Flanagan | TKO (punches) | FX3: Fight Night 7 | 15 March 2008 | 1 | 1:16 | Reading, Berkshire, England | |

- This record does not include Osipczak's wins at The Ultimate Fighter elimination bout for the show entrance or his preliminary fights for the house entrance. It does not include either his wins at his Semi-Pro and Amateur fights, which would raise Osipczak's full MMA record to a total of 18 fights (13-4-1).

== Titles and accomplishments ==
- Mixed Martial Arts
  - Semi-Finalist in The Ultimate Fighter: United States vs. United Kingdom (Welterweight Division)
  - Included in the Top 15 TUF Knock-Outs of All Time.
- Kung Fu
  - Champion in the UK National Open Weight Kung Fu Championship
