= The Ultimate Fighter: United States vs. United Kingdom =

UFC mixed martial arts television series and event in 2009

- Genre: Reality, Sports
- Created by: Craig Piligian, Frank Fertitta III, Lorenzo Fertitta, Dana White
- Starring: Dana White, Michael Bisping, Dan Henderson
- Country of origin: United States

Production
- Running time: 60 minutes

Original release
- Network: Spike, Virgin 1

The Ultimate Fighter: United States vs. United Kingdom is the ninth installment of the Ultimate Fighting Championship (UFC) produced reality television series The Ultimate Fighter. It began production in January 2009, and began airing on Spike on April 1, 2009. The season featured Lightweight fighters (146–155 lb) and Welterweight fighters (156–170 lb). In order to be considered for the show, a fighter had to have competed in at least three professional bouts prior to the tryouts in October 2008.

UFC Middleweight fighter and winner of The Ultimate Fighter 3, Michael Bisping served as one of the two coaches. The other coach was Dan Henderson. Henderson earned his place as a coach at UFC 93 by defeating Rich Franklin.

Bisping and Henderson fought each other at UFC 100 on July 11, 2009. Henderson defeated Bisping at the event via second-round knockout.

== Cast ==
=== Coaches ===
- Team United States
  - Dan Henderson, head coach
  - Cyrille Diabaté, Muay Thai instructor
  - Ricardo Feliciano, Jiu-Jitsu instructor
  - Gustavo Pugliese, Boxing instructor
  - Heath Sims, Wrestling instructor
- Team United Kingdom
  - Michael Bisping, head coach
  - Dave Jackson, Thai Boxing instructor
  - Mario Neto, Brazilian jiu-jitsu instructor

=== Fighters ===
- Team United States
  - Lightweights: Santino DeFranco, Jason Dent, Cameron Dollar, Richie Whitson
  - Welterweights: DaMarques Johnson, Frank Lester, Mark Miller, Jason Pierce
- Team United Kingdom
  - Lightweights: Jeff Lawson, Ross Pearson, Martin Stapleton, Andre Winner
  - Welterweights: Dean Amasinger, David Faulkner, Nick Osipczak, James Wilks
- US Fighters Eliminated in or before Entry Round:
  - Lightweights: Paul Bird, John David-Shackelford (failed medical exam), Tommy Hayden, Waylon Lowe, Rob Browning
  - Welterweights: Steve Berger, Ray Elbe, Christian Fulgium (failed to make weight), Kevin Knabjian, Kiel Reid
- UK Fighters Eliminated in Entry Round:
  - Lightweights: James Bryan, Dan James, Gary Kelly, A.J. Wenn
  - Welterweights: James Bateman, Tommy Maguire, Che Mills, Alex Reid

=== Others ===
- Host: Dana White
- Narrator: Mike Rowe

== Episodes ==
Episode 1 – Bangers & Mashers

- The episode was filmed at the Wolfslair MMA Academy in England.
- Dana White announced that of the 16 competitors there, only eight would be flying to the United States. They fought in elimination matches to decide who made the trip.
- The elimination matches were two rounds, with a third sudden victory round if there was a draw after the second round.
- The fights actually occurred before UFC 93, so both Rich Franklin and Dan Henderson were present to observe the fights, as was Michael Bisping.
- Andre Winner defeated Gary Kelly via KO (knees and punches) at 1:48 of round 1.
- Jeff Lawson defeated James Bryan via submission (armbar) at 1:45 of round 1.
- James Wilks defeated Che Mills via submission (heel hook) at 0:30 of round 1.
- Martin Stapleton defeated Dan James via submission (rear naked choke) at 1:28 of round 1.
- Ross Pearson defeated A.J. Wenn via TKO (strikes) at 0:21 of round 2.
- Nick Osipczak defeated Tommy Maguire via KO at 4:08 of round 1.
- Dean Amasinger defeated Alex Reid via decision after three rounds.
- David Faulkner defeated James Bateman via submission (heel hook) at 1:47 of round 1.

Episode 2 – Scars & Stripes

- Dana White met with Dan Henderson at the UFC training center in Las Vegas, Nevada.
- White met with the fighters and gave them a welcoming speech. Jason Pierce passed out due to difficulties in making weight.
- John David-Shackelford was examined by a doctor and was discovered to have a contagious herpes lesion. He couldn't fight with it and was excused from the show.
- Christian Fulgium failed to make weight at his first attempt at weighing in. He was given more time to try to make weight, but was unable to. White called him out and made him admit he quit the show.
- Michael Bisping was not present during the U.S. elimination matches.
- Mark Miller defeated Kevin Knabjian, his teammate from home, via TKO (punches) at 1:59 of round 2.
- Richie Whitson defeated Paul Bird via submission (rear naked choke) at 3:11 of round 1.
- Santino DeFranco defeated Waylon Lowe via submission (rear naked choke) at 0:45 of round 2.
- Jason Pierce defeated Steve Berger via unanimous decision after three rounds.
- Cameron Dollar defeated Tommy Hayden via technical submission (rear naked choke) in round 2.
- DaMarques Johnson defeated Ray Elbe via TKO (strikes) at 3:10 of round 1.
- Due to early departures by some fighters, only six fighters won an elimination round match to be part of Team USA. Kiel Reid and Jason Dent were the only two fighters who had not fought an elimination round match. White said they couldn't get into the house without fighting an elimination match, so two additional fighters were brought in.
- The last two elimination round matches were announced for the next episode:
  - Jason Dent vs. Rob Browning
  - Kiel Reid vs. Frank Lester

Episode 3 – Red, White & Bruised

- Jason Dent, Robert Browning, Kiel Reid and Frank Lester moved into The Ultimate Fighter house with the rest of the fighters, even though they had not fought their elimination matches.
- Robert Browning, on the first night the fighters are in the house, started causing problems. He began by throwing eggs at a group of fighters on the basketball court, urinating in other people's shower and trying to get people to fight him.
- Frank Lester defeated Kiel Reid via TKO at 3:16 of round 1. Referee Steve Mazzagatti stopped the fight while Lester had a kimura applied to Reid's arm. Reid appeared to be unconscious due to a slam he applied to Lester which resulted in Reid hitting his own head into the mat in the process.
- Jason Dent defeated Robert Browning via TKO (strikes) at 3:36 of the first round.
- Dana White flipped a coin to determine which team would pick the first match up. The match up decision will then alternate from one team to the other until all of the first round matches are complete. White flips the coin and Team USA got the first pick.

Episode 4 – Game On

- Michael Bisping introduced his assistant coaches, Mario "Sukata" Neto and Dave Jackson.
- Dan Henderson introduced his assistant coaches, Gustavo Pugliese, Ricardo Feliciano, Cyrille Diabate and Heath Sims.
- Dan Henderson announced the first match up: Mark Miller vs. Nick Osipczak.
- Due to visa issues, Bisping was unable to watch the U.S. elimination matches. He reviewed Mark Miller's match on videotape, then focused on training Osipczak.
- Dana White gave his prediction that Miller would win the match.
- Nick Osipczak defeated Mark Miller via KO (head kick) at 3:54 of round 2.

Episode 5 – Wiggity Wack

- Michael Bisping announced the next match up: Andre Winner vs. Santino DeFranco.
- DeFranco mentioned that he tried out for season two of The Ultimate Fighter. After the medical exams, Dana White called him to tell him that he had two brain aneurysms and needed to seek medical treatment. DeFranco was originally told he would not be able to fight again due to the medical condition; however, his doctor finally cleared him to fight.
- Andre Winner defeated Santino DeFranco via TKO (strikes) at 3:49 of round 1.
- A segment of the episode focused on the infighting occurring within Team USA. This was presented in contrast with the camaraderie of Team UK.
- Dan Henderson announced the next match up: DaMarques Johnson vs. Dean Amasinger.
- On the day of the fight, Michael Bisping was not present. Dana White says this was the first time in TUF history that a coach did not show up for a fight.
- DaMarques Johnson defeated Dean Amasinger via submission (triangle choke) at 1:40 of round 1.

Episode 6 – $100 a Tooth

- Michael Bisping announced the next fight: Martin Stapleton vs. Cameron Dollar.
- Bisping apologised to Dean Amasinger for not showing up to Amasinger's fight. Bisping said he was asleep due to jet lag.
- Cameron Dollar defeated Martin Stapleton via submission (rear naked choke) at 1:34 of round 1.
- Dan Henderson announced the next fight: Frank Lester vs. James Wilks.
- DaMarques Johnson challenged Lester to knock one of Wilks' teeth out during the match for $100.
- After the first round of Lester's match, his four front top teeth were knocked out and stuck in his mouth guard, causing a delay starting the second round while they were removed.
- James Wilks defeated Frank Lester via submission (armbar) at 3:06 of round 2.
- In post-fight interviews, Lester revealed that, as a kid, his four front, top teeth were knocked out and replaced with false teeth. After the match, in the dressing room area, it was shown that Lester coughed up another tooth.

Episode 7 – The Bash Room

- Richie Whitson had contracted a contagious bacterial infection, impetigo, on the right side of his mouth. Jason Pierce sprayed disinfectant around the house where Richie had touched things.
- There were conversations with Team USA coaches and teammates about Jason Pierce's work ethic and attitude. Jason Pierce said that the U.S. training was really frustrating for him.
- Michael Bisping brought in a sledge hammer and a tractor tyre to train with. The fighters would swing the hammer and hit the tyre. Andre Winner missed the tyre twice, once breaking the mats the tire was sitting on. David Faulkner hit himself in the legs which causes an infection inside his leg.
- In the coaches' challenge, Henderson and Bisping played tennis for $10,000. The fighters for the winning coach would win $1,500. Henderson defeated Bisping 6 games to 2.
- Michael Bisping announced the next fight: Ross Pearson vs. Richie Whitson.
- Ross Pearson defeated Richie Whitson via submission (armbar) at 3:40 of round 1.

Episode 8 – Negative Energy

- Jason Pierce reported that he had a staph infection in his already injured foot and ankle. He wasn't sure if he could or would fight in his first round match.
- Dave Faulkner had a troublesome gag reflex that caused him to spit out his mouthpiece. Michael Bisping worked with Faulkner in the ring to attempt to train him to keep the mouthpiece in his mouth.
- Dan Henderson announced the next match: Jason Dent vs. Jeff Lawson.
- Dave Faulkner, Jeff Lawson and Dean Amasinger held a falls count anywhere wrestling match in the house.
- Dana White spoke with Jason Pierce and Dan Henderson. Pierce said that he was ready and able to fight, but acted like he didn't want to. White said he wasn't convinced that Pierce wanted to fight.
- Jason Dent defeated Jeff Lawson via submission (anaconda choke) at 2:22 of round 2.
- White spoke with Jason Pierce again. He informed Pierce that he wouldn't be allowed to fight because of the fighter's demeanour and attitude.

Episode 9 – Battle Royale

- Dan Henderson informed Team U.S. that Jason Pierce would not be fighting in the next match. Dana White called in Frank Lester and Mark Miller and asked them if they would be willing to replace Pierce. Both were willing to do so.
- Mark Miller was not medically cleared to fight due to a broken nose. Dana White decided that Frank Lester would return to the competition and fight David Faulkner even though he was missing four teeth.
- Henderson asked Michael Bisping about the teams swapping training times. Henderson said that teams are allowed to switch training times each week. An argument occurred between Bisping and Henderson, as Bisping did not want to change to the early training time, but offered to have the Faulkner-Lester fight decide the issue. Henderson declined this challenge.
- When the teams line up for the fight announcement, Bisping squirts water in the face of Damarques Johnson, as he wrongly believed that Johnson had made a racist comment during the coach challenge. They argued and Johnson left angrily. Bisping realised he had made a mistake (as the comment came from Dollar) and attempted to apologise.
- David Faulkner was still having gag reflex problems related to his mouthpiece, so he went to see a hypnotherapist to help with the situation.
- Frank Lester defeated Dave Faulkner after Dana White announces that the match will go to a sudden victory round. However, Dave Faulkner was exhausted and refused to fight another round.

Episode 10 – Smiling and Punching

- Dana White and the coaches talked to the semi-finalists to see who they wanted to fight.
- White announced the semi-final matchups:
  - Nick Osipczak vs. DeMarques Johnson
  - Andre Winner vs. Cameron Dollar
  - Ross Pearson vs. Jason Dent
  - James Wilks vs. Frank Lester
- Dana White pointed out that Frank Lester was, at that point, the only fighter in TUF history to lose his first match in the house, come back as a substitute and win.
- Richie Whitson overheard Jason Pierce talking with David Faulkner about how DeMarques Johnson trained. At a later training session, Dan Henderson approached Pierce and asked if Pierce was talking to Team UK about Team US' training sessions. Pierce denied that he was talking to Team UK.
- DaMarques Johnson defeated Nick Osipczak via decision after three rounds.

Episode 11 – More Ups, Less Downs

- Cameron Dollar had sore ribs, causing training to be difficult and painful.
- Andre Winner defeated Cameron Dollar via submission (triangle choke) in round 1.
- During training, Ross Pearson's shoulder popped out of the socket. He had Michael Bisping yank on his arm to put it back in place.
- Ross Pearson defeated Jason Dent by decision after three rounds.
- Dana White presented the lightweight, all UK, finalists: Andre Winner vs. Ross Pearson.

Episode 12 – All American Nightmare

- Dan Henderson visited the TUF house and had a BBQ meal with Team U.S.
- Frank Lester discussed with Dan Henderson, and later, James Wilks his attitude and demeanour towards their fight. He felt he was much calmer than in his first round match against Wilks.
- Michael Bisping visited the TUF house and had dinner with Team UK. Dean Amasinger cooked dinner for the team. After Bisping left, Andre Winner played around spitting and throwing food at various Team UK members. Winner hit Amasinger with a mouthful of food. Amasinger chased Winner outside and threw Winner into the swimming pool. As Winner started climbing out of the pool, Dave Faulkner ran up and threw a bag of flour onto Winner. Everyone laughed it off as a good time.
- James Wilks defeated Frank Lester via TKO (knees) in round 3.
- The welterweight final is set: James Wilks vs. DaMarques Johnson.
- Dana White said that even though Frank Lester lost to James Wilks twice, he was to him "One of the toughest son of a bitches I've ever met."

== Lightweight Bracket ==
Elimination Round
Santino DeFranco | SUB
Waylon Lowe | 2
Andre Winner | KO
Gary Kelly | 1
Cameron Dollar | SUB
Tommy Hayden | 2
Martin Stapleton | SUB
Dan James | 1
Richie Whitson | SUB
Paul Bird | 1
Ross Pearson | TKO
A.J. Wenn | 2
Jason Dent | TKO
Robert Browning | 1
Jeff Lawson | SUB
James Bryan | 1

Quarter-Finals
(United States) Santino DeFranco | 1
(United Kingdom) Andre Winner | TKO
(United States) Cameron Dollar | SUB
(United Kingdom) Martin Stapleton | 1
(United States) Richie Whitson | 1
(United Kingdom) Ross Pearson | SUB
(United States) Jason Dent | SUB
(United Kingdom) Jeff Lawson | 2

Semi-Finals
(United Kingdom) Andre Winner | SUB
(United States) Cameron Dollar | 1
(United Kingdom) Ross Pearson | UD
(United States) Jason Dent | 3

Finals
(United Kingdom) Andre Winner | 3
(United Kingdom) Ross Pearson | UD

== Welterweight Bracket ==
Elimination Round
Mark Miller | TKO
Kevin Knabjian | 2
Nick Osipczak | KO
Tommy Maguire | 1
DaMarques Johnson | TKO
Ray Elbe | 1
Dean Amasinger | UD
Alex Reid | 3
Frank Lester | TKO
Kiel Reid | 1
James Wilks | SUB
Che Mills | 1
Jason Pierce | UD
Steve Berger | 3
David Faulkner | SUB
James Bateman | 1

Quarter-Finals
(United States) Mark Miller | 2
(United Kingdom) Nick Osipczak | KO
(United States) DaMarques Johnson | SUB
(United Kingdom) Dean Amasinger | 1
(United States) Frank Lester | 2
(United Kingdom) James Wilks | SUB
(United States) Frank Lester | TKO
(United Kingdom) David Faulkner | 2

Semi-Finals
(United Kingdom) Nick Osipczak | 3
(United States) DaMarques Johnson | UD
(United Kingdom) James Wilks | TKO
(United States) Frank Lester | 3

Finals
(United States) DaMarques Johnson | 1
(United Kingdom) James Wilks | SUB

*: Frank Lester replaced Jason Pierce after Dana White did not allow Pierce to continue in the tournament.

Legend
| (United Kingdom) | Team United Kingdom |
| (United States) | Team United States |
| UD | Unanimous Decision |
| SUB | Submission |
| (T)KO | (Technical) Knock out |

== The Ultimate Fighter 9 Finale ==
The Ultimate Fighter: United States vs. United Kingdom Finale
- The poster for The Ultimate Fighter: United States vs. United Kingdom Finale
- Promotion: Ultimate Fighting Championship
- Date: June 20, 2009
- Venue: Pearl Concert Theater
- City: Las Vegas, Nevada
- Attendance: 2,217
- Total gate: $498,650

Event chronology
| UFC 99: The Comeback | The Ultimate Fighter: United States vs. United Kingdom Finale | UFC 100 |

The Ultimate Fighter: United States vs. United Kingdom Finale (also known as The Ultimate Fighter 9 Finale) was a mixed martial arts event held by the Ultimate Fighting Championship (UFC) on June 20, 2009. Featured were finals from The Ultimate Fighter: United States vs. United Kingdom in both the Lightweight and Welterweight divisions as well as a main event between Diego Sanchez and Clay Guida.

=== Background ===
A previously announced lightweight bout between Thiago Tavares and Melvin Guillard was called off due to an elbow injury suffered by Tavares. Gleison Tibau would step in as Tavares' replacement.

Eric Schafer was originally scheduled to face Tomasz Drwal at this event, but he injured his rib and was replaced by Mike Ciesnolevicz.

A matchup between Anthony Johnson and Matt Brown was scrapped due to a knee injury suffered by Johnson. A replacement was set to be named, however, due to nagging injuries Brown did not fight on the card.

This was the first time in the organization's history, the UFC handed out three Fight of the Night bonuses. Another first for the UFC came in the form of Kim Winslow, the first female referee to officiate a fight in the organization.

This was the first UFC event to feature five Ultimate Fighter winners on the complete card, including season 9 champions Ross Pearson & James Wilks, and previous season champions Diego Sanchez, Joe Stevenson, and Nate Diaz. Only UFC 114 the following year has had the same number of TUF winners since.

=== Results ===
Main card (Spike TV)
| Weight class | | | | Method | Round | Time | Notes |
|---|---|---|---|---|---|---|---|
| Lightweight | Diego Sanchez | def. | Clay Guida | Decision (split) (28–29, 29–27, 29–28) | 3 | 5:00 |
| Welterweight | James Wilks | def. | DaMarques Johnson | Submission (rear-naked choke) | 1 | 4:54 | (Note: The Ultimate Fighter 9 Welterweight Final) |
| Lightweight | Ross Pearson | def. | Andre Winner | Decision (unanimous) (29–28, 29–28, 29–28) | 3 | 5:00 | (Note: The Ultimate Fighter 9 Lightweight Final) |
| Welterweight | Chris Lytle | def. | Kevin Burns | Decision (unanimous) (29–28, 29–28, 29–28) | 3 | 5:00 |
| Lightweight | Joe Stevenson | def. | Nate Diaz | Decision (unanimous) (29–28, 29–28, 29–28) | 3 | 5:00 |
Preliminary card
| Lightweight | Melvin Guillard | def. | Gleison Tibau | Decision (split) (29–28, 28–29, 29–28) | 3 | 5:00 |
| Welterweight | Brad Blackburn | def. | Edgar Garcia | Decision (split) (28–29, 29–28, 29–28) | 3 | 5:00 |
| Catchweight (208 lb) | Tomasz Drwal | def. | Mike Ciesnolevicz | TKO (knee and punches) | 1 | 4:48 | (Note: Ciesnolevicz did not make the 206 pound light heavyweight limit.) |
| Welterweight | Nick Osipczak | def. | Frank Lester | Submission (rear-naked choke) | 1 | 3:40 |
| Lightweight | Jason Dent | def. | Cameron Dollar | Submission (anaconda choke) | 1 | 4:46 |

=== Bonus awards ===
The following fighters received $25,000 bonuses.

- Fight of the Night: Diego Sanchez vs. Clay Guida, Joe Stevenson vs. Nate Diaz and Chris Lytle vs. Kevin Burns
- Knockout of the Night: Tomasz Drwal
- Submission of the Night: Jason Dent

== See also ==
- Ultimate Fighting Championship
- List of UFC events
- 2009 in UFC
- The Ultimate Fighter
- List of current UFC fighters
