= Mike Dolce =

American trainer, coach, author, and motivational speaker

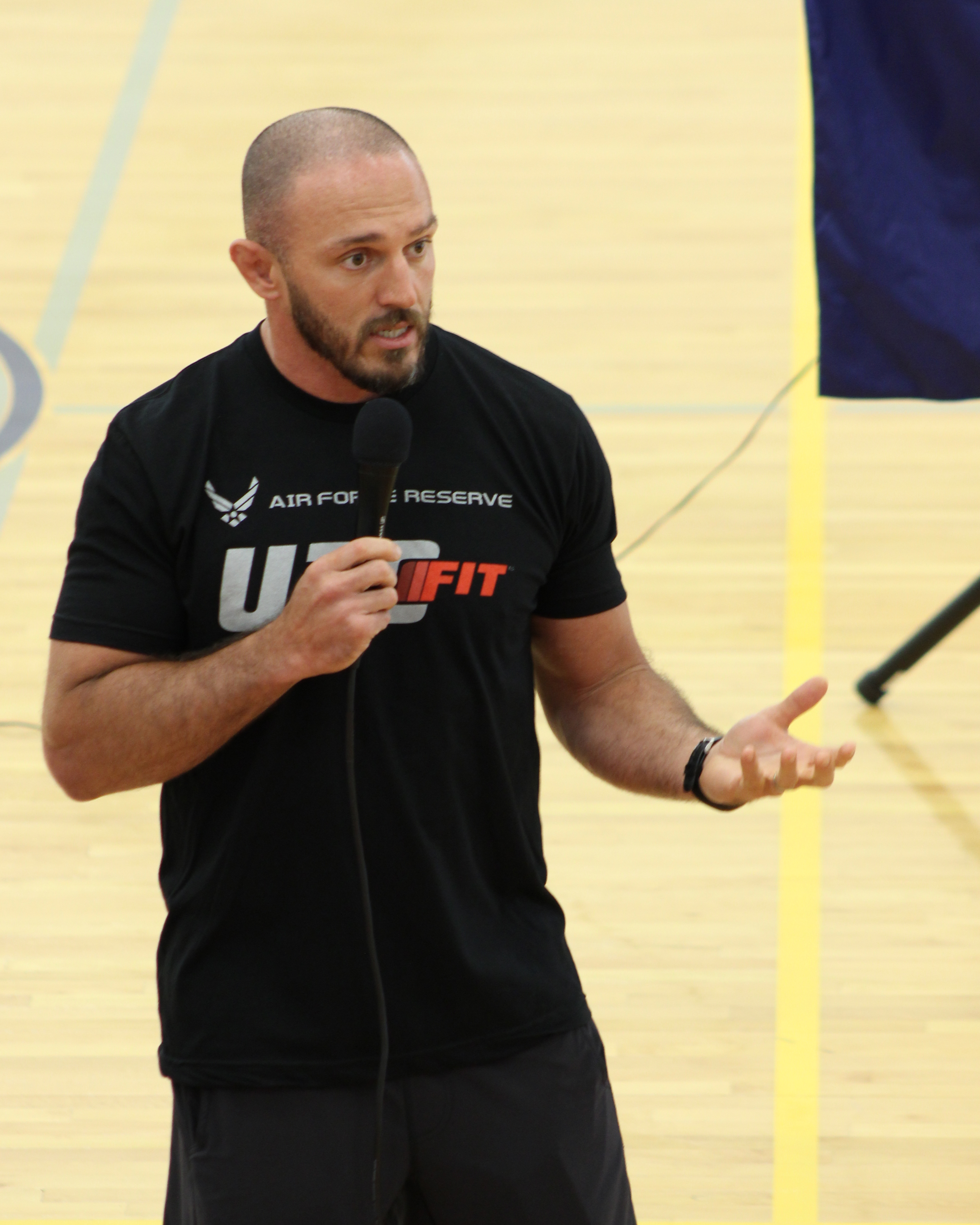
- Dolce in 2014

Personal information
- Nationality: American
- Born: April 15, 1976 (age 50) Belmar, New Jersey, United States
- Spouse: Brandy Dolce
- Children: 2

Michael “Mike” Dolce (born April 15, 1976) is an American trainer, strength and conditioning coach, weight-cut coach, author, nutrition and fitness expert, and motivational speaker. He is a former mixed martial artist.

Dolce is best known for managing the weight cuts of UFC athletes such as Johny Hendricks, Ronda Rousey and Thiago Alves. He was voted as the 2013, 2014, 2015 and 2016 World MMA Trainer of the Year.

== Early life ==
Mike Dolce was born and raised in Belmar, New Jersey, the son of James Vincent Dolce (who worked with animals), and Joanne Cobb. At age 8 he had an obsession with muscle building and strength training which led him to become a wrestler and powerlifter in high school.

By the age of 13, Dolce was wrestling competitively, and cutting weight in an attempt to earn a college scholarship. In 1993, when he was 17 years old, Dolce opened his own personal training business.

== Professional fighting career ==
Dolce started training as a wrestler in 1990. In 1999, Dolce began practicing mixed martial arts (MMA). He won his first three professional MMA bouts.

As a professional MMA fighter, he fought at welterweight for the Portland Wolfpack of the International Fight League (IFL) and set the record for fastest knockout in IFL history.

Dolce made it onto season 7 of reality TV show The Ultimate Fighter but was eliminated in the first round.

== Professional coaching career ==
In 2004, Dolce was hired as the head strength and conditioning coach by Team Quest in Portland, Oregon, working with Randy Couture, Dan Henderson, Nate Quarry, and Chael Sonnen.

Dolce’s methods as a weight-cut coach were highlighted in 2010, after successfully managing the 45-pound weight cut for Quinton "Rampage" Jackson. In another successful weight-cut, Dolce helped Duane Ludwig. He also led Ronda Rousey through her weight cut for her championship fight against Miesha Tate.

Since then, Dolce has been the weight-cut coach to many UFC athletes such as Johny Hendricks, Ronda Rousey, Gilbert Melendez, Vitor Belfort, Thiago Alves, Chael Sonnen, Mirsad Bektic, Nik Lentz, Duane Ludwig, Michael Bisping, Antonio Silva and Jake Ellenberger, helping them shed significant pounds before their fights.

In 2007, Dolce published The Dolce Diet: 3 Weeks to Shredded. He then published The Dolce Diet: Living Lean in 2010 and The Dolce Diet: Living Lean Cookbook in 2011.

Dolce also records weekly fitness and nutrition podcasts, videos and gives over 30 motivational talks to the U.S. military every year.

== Awards and recognitions ==
Dolce boasts the fastest knockout in International Fight League (IFL) history.

He was voted the 2013, 2014, 2015 and 2016 Trainer of the Year at the World MMA Awards, an award given to the leading and most influential strength and conditioning expert, sports psychology mentor or nutrition advisor in MMA. In 2014, Dolce was inducted into the New Jersey Martial Arts Hall of Fame for his contributions in the area of health and nutrition.

== Criticism ==
In 2014, Dolce coached B.J. Penn for his third fight with Frankie Edgar. Penn lost the fight via TKO, and said afterwards he would "never hire Dolce again for anything". Dolce responded to the criticism and cited stress and pressure as reasons for Penn's loss.

George Lockhart, nutritionist to Conor McGregor, Daniel Cormier and other UFC champions, claimed in 2014 that he had never seen any real science from Dolce, and pointed to the fact that four athletes coached by Dolce had been caught using performance-enhancing drugs. UFC commentator, Joe Rogan, refuted these claims in episode 579 of his podcast, stating, "no Dolce athlete... ever tested positive for any banned substances, while working with Dolce."

A follow-up interview with Mike Dolce showed that he had turned down a business proposal by Lockhart in which Dolce would have nothing to do with designing the programs or diets, but would simply lend his name for marketing purposes. MMA journalist Steph Daniels stated, "I can verify the contents of the e-mail to be exactly as he described, since Mike forwarded it to me."

== Mixed martial arts record ==
Professional record breakdown
15 matches	5 wins	10 losses
By knockout	3	3
By submission	0	2
By decision	2	5

Res.	Record	Opponent	Method	Event	Date	Round	Time	Location	Notes
Loss	5–10	J. T. Taylor	Decision (split)	UFO: Rumble at the Races	July 24, 2010	3	5:00	Kennewick, Washington, United States	
Win	5–9	Michael Riggs	KO (knee)	Kickdown 80: Mile High Battle	July 10, 2010	1	4:59	Denver, Colorado, United States	
Loss	4–9	Dennis Olson	Submission (guillotine choke)	Adrenaline: New Breed	February 26, 2010	3	3:17	Atlantic City, New Jersey, United States	
Loss	4–8	Roman Mitichyan	Decision (unanimous)	Called Out MMA: Called Out MMA 1	August 15, 2009	3	5:00	Ontario, California, United States	
Loss	4–7	Shane Primm	TKO (punches)	Music City MMA: Rock and Havoc	July 18, 2009	1	4:44	Nashville, Tennessee, United States	
Win	4–6	Nuri Shakir	TKO (punches)	WCF: World Championship Fighting 6	March 14, 2009	2	2:25	Wilmington, Massachusetts, United States	
Loss	3–6	Jake Paul	Submission (guillotine choke)	RFC: Bragging Rights 2	September 13, 2008	1	2:20	Eugene, Oregon, United States	
Loss	3–5	Karl Amoussou	TKO (kick to the body)	M-1 Challenge 5: Japan	July 17, 2008	2	0:41	Tokyo, Japan	
Loss	3–4	Mike Pierce	KO (punches)	SF 20: Homecoming	October 27, 2007	1	N/A	Portland, Oregon, United States	
Loss	3–3	Lyman Good	Decision (unanimous)	IFL: 2007 Semifinals	August 2, 2007	3	4:00	East Rutherford, New Jersey, United States	
Loss	3–2	Antonio McKee	Decision (unanimous)	IFL: Everett	June 1, 2007	3	4:00	Everett, Washington, United States	
Loss	3–1	Delson Heleno	Decision (unanimous)	IFL: Connecticut	April 13, 2007	3	4:00	Uncasville, Connecticut, United States	
Win	3–0	Jim Abrille	TKO (punches)	IFL: Atlanta	February 23, 2007	1	0:19	Atlanta, Georgia, United States	
Win	2–0	Mitch Whitesel	Decision (unanimous)	ROC 12: Tournament of Champions Quarterfinals	November 17, 2006	3	5:00	Atlantic City, New Jersey, United States	
Win	1–0	Josh Burnham	Decision (unanimous)	SF 17: Hot Zone	August 5, 2006	3	5:00	Portland, Oregon, United States	

=== Mixed martial arts amateur record ===
Amateur record breakdown		
4 matches	1 win	3 losses
By knockout	1	2
By decision	0	1

Res.	Record	Opponent	Method	Event	Date	Round	Time	Location	Notes
Loss	1–3	Peter Aspenwal	Decision (unanimous)	SF 15: Tribute	April 8, 2006	3	3:00	Oregon, United States	
Loss	1–2	Cory Devela	KO (punch)	SF 12: Breakout	September 16, 2005	2	0:00	Portland, Oregon, United States	
Win	1–1	Tom Brown	KO (punch)	SF 10: Mayhem	May 28, 2005	1	1:42	Gresham, Oregon, United States	
Loss	0–1	Bristol Marunde	TKO (punches)	SF 8: Justice	January 8, 2005	1	2:54	Gresham, Oregon, United States	

== Media ==
Dolce was named a Game Changer of the Year in 2014 by Men's Fitness magazine.

He was also a coach on ABC's Extreme Weight Loss with Chris Powell in 2014.

Dolce was featured on Wake Up Call, hosted by Dwayne "The Rock" Johnson, in 2014 as the expert nutritionist, and appeared on an episode of MTV's Jobs That Don't Suck.

Dolce has also been featured heavily on London Real TV for his diet, fitness and motivation advice.
