= Jared Rollins =

American martial artist (born 1977)

- Born: January 26, 1977 (age 49); Long Beach, California, United States
- Other names: J-Roc
- Height: 5 ft 9 in (1.75 m)
- Weight: 185 lb (84 kg; 13.2 st)
- Fighting out of: Irvine, California
- Team: Team Oyama

Mixed martial arts record
- Total: 12
- Wins: 7
- By knockout: 4
- By submission: 3
- Losses: 5
- By knockout: 4
- By disqualification: 1

Other information
- Mixed martial arts record from Sherdog

Jared Rollins (born January 26, 1977) is an American former professional mixed martial artist. He was formerly a fighter on The Ultimate Fighter: Team Hughes vs. Team Serra, fighting on Team Hughes. He received his brown belt in Brazilian Jiu-Jitsu from the São Paulo based lotus club jiu-jitsu camp and black belt professor Givanildo Nascimento. Jared was a member of Team Oyama. Jared started training in the martial art of Brazilian Jiu-Jitsu in 1999. His first professor was Carlson Gracie black belt Franco De Camargo.

== Mixed martial arts ==
Jared had his first fight in 2002, his fight was against Shannon Ritch. Jared defeated Ritch via submission in the first round. Jared did not fight again until 2004, he fought Mark Longworth and again won via submission in the first round. After two wins, Jared debuted in the King of the Cage promotion. Jared lost the fight against Brendan Seguin via TKO. He was not done fighting for the KOTC though. Jared defeated Steve Lapoint via TKO in the first round. After the fight, Jared started fighting for smaller promotions. He then came back to King of the Cage with a win over Richard Solis. A few months passed before Jared had another fight, his next fight was in Tokyo, Japan, Jared lost the fight. Jared was then selected to be on the sixth season of The Ultimate Fighter.

=== The Ultimate Fighter ===
Jared was on The Ultimate Fighter: Team Hughes vs. Team Serra, Jared fought on Team Hughes. In his first fight of the competition, Rollins was defeated by George Sotiropoulos. Rollins took the loss very hard. Dana White told him he has nothing to be upset about, that he "fought his ass off."

=== Ultimate Fighting Championship ===
Rollins was defeated by War Machine at The Ultimate Fighter: Team Hughes vs. Team Serra Finale via TKO at 2:10 of the third round. The fight was later named fight of the night, which saw both Rollins and War Machine leave the arena with a 30 thousand dollar bonus, and a three fight contract with the UFC.

Rollins was set to fight Ben Saunders at UFC 86, but the fight was pushed back due to an unknown reason. The fight was then confirmed to be moved back to UFC 87, Rollins suffered a torn muscle in training and was forced to withdraw from the bout causing Saunders to fight a new opponent. Shortly after Rollins sustained another serious injury in training that put him out of fighting for 12 months. During this time, Jared Rollins was released from his contract and no longer fights for the UFC.

Rollins has never fought since the fight of the night performance, which ranked 81st on the UFC's 100 greatest fights list.

== Championships and accomplishments ==
- Ultimate Fighting Championship
  - Fight of the Night (One time)
  - UFC.com Awards
    - 2007: Ranked #4 Fight of the Year vs. Jon Koppenhaver

== Mixed martial arts record ==
Professional record breakdown
12 matches	7 wins	5 losses
By knockout	4	4
By submission	3	0
By decision	0	0
By disqualification	0	1

Res.	Record	Opponent	Method	Event	Date	Round	Time	Location	Notes
Loss	8–4	War Machine	TKO (punches)	The Ultimate Fighter 6 Finale	December 8, 2007	3	2:01	Las Vegas, Nevada, United States	Fight of the Night.
Loss	8–3	Akira Kikuchi	TKO (punches)	GCM: Cage Force 2	March 17, 2007	2	1:34	Tokyo, Japan	
Win	8–2	Richard Solis	Submission (armbar)	KOTC: Destroyer	December 1, 2006	2	4:59	San Jacinto, California, United States	
Win	7–2	Micah Bender	TKO	IFBL: Fight Night 1	December 15, 2005	2	N/A	Niles, Ohio, United States	
Win	6–2	Diman Morris	N/A	Kage Kombat: The Rode to Ritches	November 12, 2005	N/A	N/A	California, United States	
Loss	5–2	Brandon Magana	DQ (Illegal knee)	Total Combat 10	October 15, 2005	1	2:57	San Diego, California, United States	
Win	5–1	Brian Fontz	TKO(strikes)	GC 42: Summer Slam	September 10, 2005	1	0:36	Lakeport, California, United States	
Win	4–1	Steve Lapoint	TKO (punches)	KOTC: Grudge Match	June 17, 2005	1	2:34	Albuquerque, New Mexico, United States	
Loss	3–1	Brendan Seguin	TKO (punches)	KOTC: Natural Disaster	April 15, 2005	1	2:19	El Paso, Texas, United States	
Win	3–0	Brian Warren	TKO (punches)	Venom - First Strike	September 18, 2004	1	3:28	Huntington Beach, California, United States	
Win	2–0	Mark Longworth	Submission	Pit Fighting Championship	February 7, 2004	1		Upland, California, United States	
Win	1–0	Shannon Ritch	Submission (kimura)	XCF: California Pancration Championships	June 11, 2002	1	2:33	Los Angeles, California, United States	
