= The Ultimate Fighter: Team Hughes vs. Team Serra =

UFC mixed martial arts television series and event in 2007

- Genre: Reality, Sports
- Created by: Craig Piligian, Frank Fertitta III, Lorenzo Fertitta, Dana White
- Starring: Dana White, Matt Serra, and Matt Hughes
- Country of origin: United States

Production
- Running time: 60 minutes

Original release
- Network: Spike TV
- Release: September 19 – December 8, 2007

The Ultimate Fighter: Team Hughes vs. Team Serra was the sixth season of the Ultimate Fighting Championship (UFC) produced reality television series The Ultimate Fighter, and premiered on September 19, 2007, on Spike TV, after UFC Fight Night 11. This season featured only welterweight fighters (156–170 lb). The teams were coached by current UFC welterweight champion Matt Serra and former welterweight champion Matt Hughes. The coaches were to fight for the welterweight title after the completion of the show, on December 29 at UFC 79. However, due to an injury sustained by Serra, Hughes instead faced former welterweight champion Georges St-Pierre for the interim title, with St-Pierre defeating Hughes by submission in the second round and going on to challenge Serra for the undisputed welterweight title at UFC 83.

Both coaches were participating in a series of TUF for the second time. Hughes was a coach on The Ultimate Fighter 2 and Serra won the welterweight tournament on The Ultimate Fighter 4.

Unlike in previous seasons, the winner of a match did not determine which team picked the next match. The teams alternated picking matches in the first round, regardless of results, and the team that had the most wins picked the fights for the quarterfinals.

== Cast ==
=== Coaches and trainers ===
- Team Hughes
  - Matt Hughes, head coach
  - Robbie Lawler, wrestling coach
  - Matt Pena, boxing coach
  - Marc Fiore, strength and conditioning coach
- Team Serra
  - Matt Serra, head coach
  - Ray Longo, kickboxing coach
  - Pete Sell, jiu-jitsu coach

=== Fighters ===
Team Serra

- Joe Scarola, George Sotiropoulos, Matt Arroyo, John Kolosci, Ben Saunders, Troy Mandaloniz, Richie Hightower, Roman Mitichyan (Jon Koppenhaver)*

Team Hughes

- Dan Barrera, Blake Bowman, Mac Danzig, Paul Georgieff, Billy Miles, Dorian Price, Jared Rollins, Tom Speer

* Mitichyan was replaced on episode 1 by Koppenhaver due to injury.

=== Others ===
- Host: Dana White
- Narrator: Mike Rowe

== Episodes ==
Episode 1 – Don't You Tap (Original Air Date Sep 19, 2007)

- A coin is flipped (grey for Hughes, blue for Serra) and Matt Serra wins. He opts to pick the first fighter, his student Scarola, which means Hughes gets to pick the first fight.

Coach	1st Pick	2nd Pick	3rd Pick	4th Pick	5th Pick	6th Pick	7th Pick	8th Pick
Serra	Joe Scarola	George Sotiropoulos	Matt Arroyo	John Kolosci	Ben Saunders	Roman Mitichyan	Troy Mandaloniz	Richie Hightower
Hughes	Dan Barrera	Mac Danzig	Billy Miles	Jared Rollins	Tommy Speer	Paul Georgieff	Dorian Price	Blake Bowman

- Mitichyan fractures his elbow during the evaluation session and is sent to a doctor, who determined that the Armenian was unable to fight.
- Mitichyan was enraged at this and started kicking things, swearing heavily, and claiming that the doctor was out of his mind. He was then replaced by Jon Koppenhaver, with Team Serra wishing him well.
- Mac Danzig defeats Joe Scarola by submission (triangle choke) at 4:54 of the first round.

Episode 2 – I Need You, Bro (Original Air Date Sep 26, 2007)

- Team Serra chooses the second fight.
- Joe Scarola considers leaving the house.
- Matt Arroyo defeats Dorian Price by submission (rear naked choke) at 1:48 of the first round.

Episode 3 – It's About Character (Original Air Date Oct 03, 2007)

- Team Hughes chooses Miles to fight Kolosci.
- Both teams watch UFC 72.
- Serra and Joe Scarola have a talk about Scarola still wanting to leave the house.
- Upon returning from UFC 72, White has a talk with Scarola.
- Scarola decides to leave the house. He also loses his job back at home teaching at Serra's academy due to his departure.
- John Kolosci defeats Billy Miles by submission (guillotine choke) at 2:56 of the first round.

Episode 4 – Get Out Of My Face (Original Air Date Oct 10, 2007)

- Frustrated by Billy Miles' lack of effort in his fight, Hughes puts his team through a strenuous workout.
- Team Serra chooses Richie Hightower to fight Blake Bowman.
- Dorian Price has a confrontation with members of the filming crew. White allows him to stay, but warns that if it happens again, he will be sent home.
- After workouts, a cake is delivered to the house for Bowman's birthday, and Jon Koppenhaver takes the initiative to decorate it for Bowman. Then, all the fighters celebrate his birthday together at the house.
- Mac Danzig expresses how much he dislikes Hightower, saying that he is not even sure what Hightower is doing here.
- Richie Hightower defeats Blake Bowman TKO (strikes) at 0:49 of the first round.

Episode 5 – Not A Real Fighter (Original Air Date Oct 17, 2007)

- The fighters get to watch the finale of TUF 5.
- Mac Danzig goes off on Blake Bowman after they watch the replay of Bowman's friend Cole Miller defeat Danzig's friend Andy Wang by TKO in the TUF 5 Finale. He tells Bowman, "you aren't a real fighter, just a hick from Alabama, or wherever the fuck you're from."
- Paul Georgieff receives news from his mother, after Hughes arrives at the house and allows him a phone call, that his 19-year-old cousin has died.
- White allows Georgieff to fly home for the funeral, only if he fights before he leaves.
- Because of the circumstances, Team Hughes chooses Georgieff to fight Troy Mandaloniz.
- Bowman tells all the fighters what Danzig said to him earlier, and all the other fighters agree with Bowman and think it was completely uncalled for Danzig to say that about him for no reason. Ben Saunders says he considers Bowman a fighter just like everyone else who is here.
- Hughes gets wind of what happened at the house, and he has a talk with his team the next day during practice, calling out Danzig and saying that he should apologize.
- Saunders, Mandaloniz, and Jon Koppenhaver draw Danzig's face on a milk carton while Team Hughes is away at practice, and they repeatedly beat it all throughout the house.
- Troy Mandaloniz defeats Paul Georgieff by KO (punch) at 2:39 of the first round.
- Team Hughes must win the next three fights to get the power of choosing the quarterfinal fights.

Episode 6 – It's All A Test (Original Air Date Oct 24, 2007)

- Team Serra chooses Saunders to fight Barrera.
- The fighters on the grey team continuously say that Barerra goes harder than he should in practice.
- Georgieff arrives back from his cousin's funeral.
- On the van ride back to the house, Barrera and all the other fighters on Team Hughes discover that Barerra's hand is very swollen, and none of them know how or when during training it happened. He goes to the doctor to get it checked out, and the doctor clears him for the fight; he only has some soft tissue damage and swelling.
- White allows Barrera to call his wife because of a family emergency. Barrera's wife says she had some sort of panic attack, which he thinks was a seizure. He later tells White, "it's all a test" and that God is testing him and his family
- Ben Saunders defeats Dan Barrera by majority decision after two rounds.
- Hughes complained to Nevada Athletic Commission Executive Director Keith Kizer about what he perceived to be poor judging after the bout, and both Serra and White stated they felt the fight should have gone into the third round.
- On a recommendation from Matt Arroyo, White gives both fighters a $5,000 bonus for the fight stating that he hates it when fighters "lose an opportunity."
- With Saunders' win, Team Serra gains the ability to decide the quarterfinal match-ups.

Episode 7 – The Game Plan (Original Air Date Oct 31, 2007)

- Hughes is frustrated after five straight losses, going off on his team and Barrera and nearly walking off the show.
- Team Hughes chooses Rollins to fight Sotiropoulos leaving Tom Speer to fight Jon Koppenhaver.
- Team Serra turns on Sotiropoulos for not waking them up. Ben Saunders says that the Australian is only here for himself.
- Rollins injures his ribs at practice before the fight, and becomes very emotional because he does not want to be unable to fight. After going to the doctor, Rollins tells his teammates he only has bruised ribs, and the doctor cleared him to fight.
- Saunders and Sotiropoulos get into a verbal disagreement over the Australian not waking his team up for the second consecutive day.
- George Sotiropoulos defeats Jared Rollins by TKO (strikes) at 3:48 of the first round.
- Rollins takes the loss very hard and is very emotional. White consoles him and tells him that he has nothing to be upset about, and that he "fought his ass off."

Episode 8 – War Machine (Original Air Date Nov 07, 2007)

- Hughes smacks Speer across the face and repeatedly tries to get him to show more fire. Hughes wants him to show more emotion not only in his training, but also in his upcoming fight.
- Koppenhaver becomes upset when Serra continuously coaches Sotiropoulos and not him, and believes that he is being treated unfairly. Serra then sits Koppenhaver down and tries to help him with the mental aspect of fighting.
- During the blue team's training session, Serra mocks Hughes by imitating him, saying he looks like a chipmunk, and makes fun of his fight with Georges St-Pierre at UFC 65.
- Koppenhaver reveals to the rest of his team that he witnessed his father die from a heart attack when he was only 13 years old.
- Tom Speer defeats Jon Koppenhaver by decision after 2 rounds.
- This was despite an early fury from Koppenhaver, in which he opened up a cut and nearly submitted Speer with a rear naked choke.
- If not for the cut being so bad, with a massive amount of blood which made the bodies more slippery, Team Serra believes that Koppenhaver would have submitted Speer.

Episode 9 – Karma (Original Air Date Nov 14, 2007)

- During selections for the quarterfinals, Serra wants the two Team Hughes fighters (Danzig and Speer) to fight each other, but his fighters want otherwise.
- The fights that Serra chooses are: Danzig against Kolosci, Matt Arroyo vs. Troy Mandaloniz, George Sotiropoulos vs. Richie Hightower, and Tom Speer vs. Ben Saunders.
- White tells Team Serra that since four members of the blue team are fighting each other, two of them will be cornered and trained by Hughes for their fights. Serra decides not to pick which guys he wants to send to Hughes.
- Many of the fighters complain of Danzig and his bipolar mood swings.
- Danzig orders a hummingbird feeder and hangs it outside on a lightpole. Other fighters, such as Jon Koppenhaver, move it around various places in the backyard to intentionally anger Danzig.
- Later that night, Danzig has a heart-to-heart with Blake Bowman, and decides to take a more positive approach to his experience on the show. He then promises to be nice to Bowman for the rest of the time they are on the show.
- The next day, after the weigh-ins, it is determined by coin toss that Hightower and Arroyo will be cornered and trained by Hughes for their quarterfinal fights.
- Hightower and Arroyo approach the Team Hughes coaches and tell them that they both plan to continue training with Team Serra.
- Mac Danzig defeated John Kolosci by submission (rear naked choke) at 3:55 of the first round.

Episode 10 – Nothing To Lose (Original Air Date Nov 21, 2007)

- John Kolosci gets drunk and takes the house apart after his loss. He and Jon Koppenhaver throw the foosball table into the pool. Kolosci then proceeds to throw anything and everything he can find into the pool; finally, he headbutts a tree.
- Serra tells Mandaloniz and Sotiropoulos that he will not be cornering them in their fights against their fellow members of the blue team.
- Hughes calls Serra unprofessional for choosing not to corner Mandaloniz and Sotiropoulous.
- White takes both teams to the Red Rock Bowling Lanes for the Coaches' Challenge this season. He then says Serra and Hughes will bowl for a box containing $10,000. Plus, each fighter on the winning team will get $1,500. Hughes asks White to double that amount to $3,000 for each fighter.
- After watching Hughes bowl, White says he will do it if Hughes throws a strike with his next ball, which he does. However, Serra ends up winning the bowling competition in the last frame with help from Matt Arroyo. Hughes immediately leaves the bowling alley after he loses.
- Matt Arroyo submits Troy Mandaloniz by submission (armbar) at 1:06 in the first round.
- George Sotiropoulos defeated Richie Hightower by submission (kimura) at 4:07 in the first round.

Episode 11 – Upper Decker (Original Air Date Nov 28, 2007)

- Speer is worried that he may not be cleared to fight due to how badly his face is bruised and cut up from his last fight against Jon Koppenhaver.
- During the time Team Hughes was at their training session, Richie Hightower, Troy Mandaloniz and Koppenhaver decided to play a prank after they have been drinking, in which a person puts their feces in the toilet's tank, so when someone flushes the toilet, the feces washes up into the bowl (known as an "upper decker").
- When Team Hughes returns to the house, Mac Danzig gets annoyed with Hightower and says he laughs like Fran Drescher.
- When Jared Rollins finds out about the upper decker, he kicks in Koppenhaver's door and confronts the three about it. Rollins slaps Koppenhaver across the head and rips his hat off, so Koppenhaver tackles him down onto the bed. They eventually resolve the conflict and Koppenhaver and Mandaloniz clean up the upper decker.
- Tom Speer defeated Ben Saunders by unanimous decision after the second round.
- Semifinal matches will be Danzig against Matt Arroyo and Speer against George Sotiropoulos.

Episode 12 – Do You Want This Fight? (Original Air Date Dec 05, 2007)

- Matt Arroyo injures a rib in training and decides to pull out of his fight against Danzig.
- Kolosci is the only Team Serra fighter who expressed excitement at the prospect of replacing Arroyo, so he is picked to face Danzig for the second time.
- Mac Danzig defeated John Kolosci by submission (rear naked choke) at 4:28 in round one.
- This for the second time, with exactly the same type of submission.
- Tom Speer defeated George Sotiropoulos by KO (strikes) at 2:57 in the first round.
- Danzig and Speer, both from Team Hughes, are the final fighters standing and will face off in the final.

== Tournament bracket ==
Elimination Round
Mac Danzig	SUB
Joe Scarola	1
Billy Miles	1
John Kolosci	SUB
Dorian Price	1
Matt Arroyo	SUB
Paul Georgieff	1
Troy Mandaloniz	KO
Blake Bowman	1
Richie Hightower	TKO
Jared Rollins	1
George Sotiropoulos	KO
Tom Speer	UD
Jon Koppenhaver	2
Dan Barrera	2
Ben Saunders	MD

Quarter-Finals
Mac Danzig	SUB
John Kolosci	1
Matt Arroyo	SUB
Troy Mandaloniz	1
Richie Hightower	1
George Sotiropoulos	SUB
Tom Speer	UD
Ben Saunders	2

Semi-Finals
Mac Danzig	SUB
John Kolosci*	1
Tom Speer	KO
George Sotiropoulos	1

Finale
Mac Danzig	SUB
Tom Speer	1

* Arroyo was replaced by Kolosci due to rib injury.

Legend
	Team Hughes
	Team Serra
UD	Unanimous Decision
MD	Majority Decision
SUB	Submission
(T) KO	(Technical) Knockout

== The Ultimate Fighter 6 Finale ==
The Ultimate Fighter: Team Hughes vs. Team Serra Finale
- The poster for The Ultimate Fighter: Team Hughes vs. Team Serra Finale
- Promotion: Ultimate Fighting Championship
- Date: December 8, 2007
- Venue: Palms Casino Resort
- City: Las Vegas, Nevada
- Total purse: $239,000

Event chronology
UFC 78: Validation	The Ultimate Fighter: Team Hughes vs. Team Serra Finale	UFC 79: Nemesis

The Ultimate Fighter: Team Hughes vs. Team Serra Finale (also known as The Ultimate Fighter 6 Finale) was a mixed martial arts event held by the Ultimate Fighting Championship (UFC) on December 8, 2007. Featured were the finals from The Ultimate Fighter: Team Hughes vs Team Serra in the Welterweight division as well as a main event between Roger Huerta and Clay Guida.

== Results ==
Main card (Spike TV)
Weight class				Method	Round	Time	Notes
Lightweight	Roger Huerta	def.	Clay Guida	Submission (rear-naked choke)	3	0:51
Welterweight	Mac Danzig	def.	Tom Speer	Submission (rear-naked choke)	1	2:01	(Note: Welterweight final for The Ultimate Fighter 6.)
Welterweight	Jon Koppenhaver	def.	Jared Rollins	TKO (punches)	3	2:01
Welterweight	George Sotiropoulos	def.	Billy Miles	Submission (rear-naked choke)	1	1:36
Welterweight	Ben Saunders	def.	Dan Barrera	Decision (unanimous) (30–27, 29–28, 30–27)	3	5:00
Preliminary card
Welterweight	Matt Arroyo	def.	John Kolosci	Submission (armbar)	1	4:42	(Note: This preliminary bout aired on the live telecast after Danzig/Speer.)
Welterweight	Jonathan Goulet	def.	Paul Georgieff	Technical Submission (rear-naked choke)	1	4:42
Welterweight	Roman Mitichyan	def.	Dorian Price	Submission (ankle lock)	1	0:23
Welterweight	Troy Mandaloniz	def.	Richie Hightower	TKO (punches)	1	4:20	(Note: This preliminary bout aired on the live telecast after Sotiropoulos/Miles.)

=== Bonus awards ===
The following fighters received $15,000 bonuses.

- Fight of the Night: Roger Huerta vs. Clay Guida and Jon Koppenhaver vs. Jared Rollins
- Knockout of the Night: Jon Koppenhaver
- Submission of the Night: Matt Arroyo

== Coaches' fight ==
UFC 98: Evans vs. Machida was held on May 23, 2009, in Paradise, Nevada.

- Welterweight bout: Matt Hughes vs. Matt Serra

Matt Hughes defeated Matt Serra via unanimous decision (29–28, 29–28, 29–28) after three rounds.

== See also ==
- Ultimate Fighting Championship
- List of UFC champions
- List of UFC events
- 2007 in UFC
