= Mac Danzig =

American mixed martial arts fighter

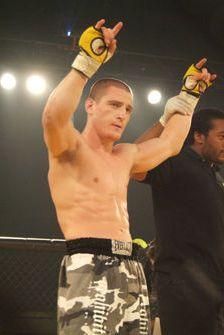
- Born: January 2, 1980 (age 46); Cleveland, Ohio, U.S.
- Height: 5 ft 8 in (1.73 m)
- Weight: 155 lb (70 kg; 11.1 st)
- Division: Lightweight; Welterweight
- Reach: 70 in (180 cm)
- Stance: Orthodox
- Fighting out of: Bend, Oregon, U.S.
- Years active: 2001–2014, 2017

Professional boxing record
- Total: 1
- Losses: 1
- By knockout: 1

Mixed martial arts record
- Total: 35
- Wins: 22
- By knockout: 5
- By submission: 11
- By decision: 6
- Losses: 12
- By knockout: 2
- By submission: 2
- By decision: 8
- Draws: 1

Amateur record
- Total: 6
- Wins: 5
- By submission: 4
- By decision: 1
- Losses: 1
- By decision: 1

Other information
- Boxing record from BoxRec
- Mixed martial arts record from Sherdog

Mac Danzig (born January 2, 1980) is an American mixed martial artist, who competed as a lightweight in several MMA promotions, most notably the Ultimate Fighting Championship. He was the winner of The Ultimate Fighter season six.

== Background ==
Mac Danzig was born on January 2, 1980 in Cleveland, Ohio. He is of German and Ulster Scot descent. Danzig grew up in the Greater Pittsburgh area before moving to Los Angeles, California to pursue his mixed martial arts career.

== Mixed martial arts career ==
In the past, Danzig was known for his association with R1 fight team (formerly RAW) and had been a student of Iowa wrestling standout Rico Chiapparelli and MMA fighter Frank Trigg. Since then, he trained boxing extensively at both the Wild Card gym in Hollywood, California under Freddie Roach assistant Justin Fortune, and also Gil Martinez in Las Vegas, Nevada during his time on the Extreme Couture MMA Team.

While Danzig is known as an impressive grappler, having scored 12 of his victories by submission; he has proven himself to be an adept striker, most notably with his KO victory over Joe Stevenson and his TKO victory over former lightweight champion Takumi Nakayama.

After defeating Royce Gracie black belt Buddy Clinton on August 4, 2006, Danzig increased his winning streak to 12 in a row with a unanimous decision victory over Miletich fighter John Mahlow on September 29 in Calgary, Alberta Canada.

Danzig then lost his KOTC title to Clay French on January 19, 2007, by split decision.

In his first major fight, facing Hayato Sakurai at PRIDE 33 on February 24, Danzig lost the fight by KO (punch) at the 4:01 mark of round two.

=== The Ultimate Fighter ===
Mac was a contestant on The Ultimate Fighter 6, Danzig defeated Joe Scarola in a preliminary fight and later defeated John Kolosci to make it to the semifinals. He then defeated Kolosci (who had replaced an injured Matt Arroyo) again, and moved on to the finals where he submitted Tom Speer in the 1st round to become TUF Season 6 winner.

=== Ultimate Fighting Championship ===
Danzig made his official UFC debut on December 8, 2007, where he won The Ultimate Fighter 6, defeating Tom Speer in the finals via rear naked choke at 2:01 of the first round. Before the fight, Danzig stated his intention to drop down in weight class to lightweight whether he won or lost, citing the size difference between himself and most of the other UFC welterweights.

Danzig made his return to lightweight by defeating Canadian Mark Bocek via third round submission at UFC 83 on April 19, 2008.

On September 17, 2008, at UFC Fight Night, Danzig lost a unanimous decision to Clay Guida, who used his wrestling to control Danzig. Danzig gave Guida some problems on the feet in the first round displaying crisp striking skills. In the second and third rounds though, Danzig succumbed to Guida's wrestling offense, as his opponent controlled him with takedowns and top control.

At UFC Fight Night 17 he lost via triangle choke to Josh Neer. Both Danzig and Neer received Fight of the Night honors. The loss dropped Danzig to 1–2 in his post-TUF career. The two fighters exchanged on the feet quite evenly in a back and forth fight, but Neer's active guard caused Danzig problems as he was caught in the fight ending submission after getting on top following a scramble in the second round.

Danzig lost to Jim Miller at UFC 100 on July 11, 2009, at the Mandalay Bay in Las Vegas via unanimous decision (30-27, 30-27, 30-27) making it his third consecutive loss in the UFC.

Danzig defeated Justin Buchholz on February 6, 2010, at UFC 109 by unanimous decision with all three judges scoring it 29–28 for Danzig, snapping his three-fight losing streak.

Danzig was defeated by Matt Wiman via first round technical submission at UFC 115. The stoppage was considered controversial by many as Wiman had Danzig in a guillotine choke, and referee Yves Lavigne called a stoppage despite the fact that Danzig had not submitted and was still conscious.

Danzig was expected to face Wiman again on September 15, 2010, at UFC Fight Night 22, but pulled out of the fight due to a chest injury sustained during training.

Danzig then faced Joe Stevenson (season 2 Ultimate Fighter winner) on December 11, 2010, at UFC 124 and earned his first KO victory in the UFC at 1:54 of the first round. While moving backwards, Danzig landed a counter-left hook that sent Stevenson to the ground, and Danzig was subsequently awarded the Knockout of the Night bonus.

Danzig was expected to face Donald Cerrone on June 11, 2011, at UFC 131 but had to withdraw due to a chest injury.

A rematch with Matt Wiman took place on October 1, 2011, at UFC on Versus 6 with Danzig losing via unanimous decision in a bout that earned Fight of the Night honors.

Danzig faced Efraín Escudero (season 8 Ultimate Fighter winner) on April 21, 2012, at UFC 145. He defeated Escudero by unanimous decision.

Danzig faced Takanori Gomi on November 10, 2012, at UFC on Fuel TV 6, with Danzig losing in a split decision.

Danzig next fought Melvin Guillard on July 27, 2013, at UFC on Fox 8. After a close first round, Danzig lost via knockout in the second round.

Danzig faced Joe Lauzon on December 14, 2013, at UFC on Fox 9. He lost the fight via unanimous decision.

After his loss to Lauzon, Danzig announced his retirement from MMA fighting on March 4, 2014. This concludes his overall record of 5-8 with the UFC. Danzig stated he retired due to concussions and accumulated brain damage.

On January 10, 2015, Danzig was awarded his Black Belt in Brazilian Jiu-Jitsu by Andy Wang and Baret Yoshida.

=== Return ===
On June 17, 2017, it was announced that Danzig would make his MMA return on August 5, 2017, to face WSOF vet Joe Condon for the CFL Junior Welterweight Championship. He won via rear naked choke in the third round to become the CFL Junior Welterweight Champion.

== Other media ==
Danzig made an appearance the 2011 documentary Forks Over Knives. He also appeared as a guest on Joe Rogan's podcast The Joe Rogan Experience in 2012.

Danzig has been credited as a "Mixed Martial Arts Consultant" for the Nickelodeon television series The Legend of Korra.

== Personal life ==
Danzig has been a vegan since 2004 and is an animal rights advocate.

In 2015 he married fellow mixed martial artist Angela Hancock, whom he coaches and trains. They have two children.

Outside of mixed martial arts, Danzig is a semi-professional nature photographer who specializes in landscape and wildlife photography.

In June 2018, Danzig announced via his Instagram page that he and his wife would be moving from Los Angeles and opening their own gym called Danzig MMA in Bend, Oregon.

== Championships and accomplishments ==
- California Fight League
  - CFL Junior Welterweight Championship (One time)
- Extreme Challenge Trials
  - 2001 Extreme Trials Eastern Regional Champion
  - 2001 Extreme Trials National Champion
- Gladiator Challenge
  - GC Lightweight World Championship (One time)
- International Fighting Championship
  - IFC Mayhem In Montana Tournament Winner
- King of the Cage
  - King of the Cage Lightweight World Championship (One time)
  - Four successful title defenses
- Ultimate Fighting Championship
  - Ultimate Fighter 6 Winner
  - Fight of the Night (Three times)
  - Knockout of the Night (One time)

== Mixed martial arts record ==
Professional record breakdown
35 matches	22 wins	12 losses
By knockout	5	2
By submission	11	2
By decision	6	8
Draws	1	

Res.	Record	Opponent	Method	Event	Date	Round	Time	Location	Notes
Win	22–12–1	Joe Condon	Submission (rear-naked choke)	CFL 11	August 5, 2017	3	2:49	Victorville, California, United States	Won the CFL Junior Welterweight Championship.
Loss	21–12–1	Joe Lauzon	Decision (unanimous)	UFC on Fox: Johnson vs. Benavidez 2	December 14, 2013	3	5:00	Sacramento, California, United States	
Loss	21–11–1	Melvin Guillard	KO (punches)	UFC on Fox: Johnson vs. Moraga	July 27, 2013	2	2:47	Seattle, Washington, United States	
Loss	21–10–1	Takanori Gomi	Decision (split)	UFC on Fuel TV: Franklin vs. Le	November 10, 2012	3	5:00	Macau, SAR, China	Fight of the Night.
Win	21–9–1	Efraín Escudero	Decision (unanimous)	UFC 145	April 21, 2012	3	5:00	Atlanta, Georgia, United States	
Loss	20–9–1	Matt Wiman	Decision (unanimous)	UFC Live: Cruz vs. Johnson	October 1, 2011	3	5:00	Washington D.C., United States	Fight of the Night.
Win	20–8–1	Joe Stevenson	KO (punch)	UFC 124	December 11, 2010	1	1:54	Montreal, Quebec, Canada	Knockout of the Night.
Loss	19–8–1	Matt Wiman	Technical submission (guillotine choke)	UFC 115	June 12, 2010	1	1:45	Vancouver, British Columbia, Canada	
Win	19–7–1	Justin Buchholz	Decision (unanimous)	UFC 109	February 6, 2010	3	5:00	Las Vegas, Nevada, United States	
Loss	18–7–1	Jim Miller	Decision (unanimous)	UFC 100	July 11, 2009	3	5:00	Las Vegas, Nevada, United States	
Loss	18–6–1	Josh Neer	Submission (triangle choke)	UFC Fight Night: Lauzon vs. Stephens	February 7, 2009	2	3:36	Tampa, Florida, United States	Fight of the Night.
Loss	18–5–1	Clay Guida	Decision (unanimous)	UFC Fight Night: Diaz vs. Neer	September 17, 2008	3	5:00	Omaha, Nebraska, United States	
Win	18–4–1	Mark Bocek	Submission (rear-naked choke)	UFC 83	April 19, 2008	3	3:48	Montreal, Quebec, Canada	Return to Lightweight.
Win	17–4–1	Tom Speer	Submission (rear-naked choke)	The Ultimate Fighter: Team Hughes vs. Team Serra Finale	December 8, 2007	1	2:01	Las Vegas, Nevada, United States	Won The Ultimate Fighter Season 6 Welterweight Tournament.
Loss	16–4–1	Hayato Sakurai	KO (punch)	Pride 33	February 24, 2007	2	4:01	Las Vegas, Nevada, United States	
Loss	16–3–1	Clay French	Decision (split)	KOTC: Hard Knocks	January 19, 2007	3	5:00	Rockford, Illinois, United States	Lost the KOTC Lightweight Championship.
Win	16–2–1	John Mahlow	Decision (unanimous)	KOTC: Detonator	September 29, 2006	3	5:00	Calgary, Alberta, Canada	Defended the KOTC Lightweight Championship
Win	15–2–1	Buddy Clinton	Decision (unanimous)	KOTC: Rapid Fire	August 4, 2006	3	5:00	San Jacinto, California, United States	Defended the KOTC Lightweight Championship.
Win	14–2–1	Orlando Ruiz	TKO (punches)	KOTC: Karnage	April 22, 2006	1	3:08	Calgary, Alberta, Canada	Defended the KOTC Lightweight Championship.
Win	13–2–1	Jason Ireland	Decision (unanimous)	KOTC: Drop Zone	March 18, 2006	3	5:00	Mt. Pleasant, Michigan, United States	Defended the KOTC Lightweight Championship.
Win	12–2–1	Takumi Nakayama	TKO (corner stoppage)	KOTC: Execution Day	October 29, 2005	3	2:45	Reno, Nevada, United States	Won the KOTC Lightweight Championship.
Win	11–2–1	Frank Kirmse	Submission (rear-naked choke)	KOTC: Shock and Awe	October 1, 2005	1	1:45	Edmonton, Alberta, Canada	
Win	10–2–1	Nick Ertl	TKO (doctor stoppage)	GC 42: Summer Slam	September 10, 2005	1	4:14	Lakeport, California, United States	Won the Gladiator Challenge Lightweight Championship.
Win	9–2–1	Mike Valdez	Submission (rear-naked choke)	KOTC 54: Mucho Machismo	June 12, 2005	1	4:13	San Jacinto, California, United States	
Win	8–2–1	Luke Spencer	Submission (rear-naked choke)	IFC: Caged Combat	May 21, 2005	1	1:56	Columbus, Ohio, United States	
Win	7–2–1	Max Marin	Submission (triangle choke)	IFC: Mayhem in Montana	April 30, 2005	1	3:39	Billings, Montana, United States	Won the IFC Mayhem In Montana Tournament.
Win	6–2–1	Brandon Olsen	Submission (rear-naked choke)	IFC: Mayhem in Montana	April 30, 2005	2	2:12	Billings, Montana, United States	IFC Mayhem In Montana Tournament Semifinals.
Win	5–2–1	Akbarh Arreola	TKO (punches)	RM 5: Road to the Championship	June 27, 2004	1	1:22	Tijuana, Mexico	
Draw	4–2–1	Jason Von Flue	Draw	Gladiator Challenge 25	April 20, 2004	2	5:00	Porterville, California, United States	
Loss	4–2	LaVerne Clark	Decision (unanimous)	Extreme Challenge 54	October 12, 2003	3	3:00	Lakemoor, Illinois, United States	
Win	4–1	Tripstin Kersiano	Submission (rear-naked choke)	Gladiator Challenge 14	February 16, 2003	2	1:49	Porterville, California, United States	
Loss	3–1	Kurt Pellegrino	Decision (unanimous)	WEC 4	August 31, 2002	3	5:00	Uncasville, Connecticut, United States	For the inaugural WEC Lightweight Championship.
Win	3–0	Brandon Bledsoe	Submission (rear-naked choke)	Gladiator Challenge 10	April 14, 2002	1	0:56	Colusa, California, United States	
Win	2–0	Ray Totorico	Submission (omoplata)	Reality Combat Fighting 12	October 20, 2001	1	1:30	Houma, Louisiana, United States	
Win	1–0	Cedric Stewart	Decision (split)	Extreme Challenge Trials	October 7, 2001	3	5:00	Decatur, Illinois, United States	

== Mixed martial arts exhibition record ==
Exhibition record breakdown		
3 matches	3 wins	0 losses
By knockout	0	0
By submission	3	0

Res.	Record	Opponent	Method	Event	Date	Round	Time	Location	Notes
Win	3–0	John Kolosci	Submission (rear-naked choke)	The Ultimate Fighter: Team Hughes vs. Team Serra	15 July 2007	1	4:29	Las Vegas, Nevada, United States	Semi-finals.
Win	2–0	John Kolosci	Submission (rear-naked choke)	The Ultimate Fighter: Team Hughes vs. Team Serra	3 July 2007	1	3:57	Las Vegas, Nevada, United States	Quarter-finals.
Win	1–0	Joe Scarola	Submission (triangle choke)	The Ultimate Fighter: Team Hughes vs. Team Serra	11 June 2007	1	4:55	Las Vegas, Nevada, United States	First round.

== Amateur mixed martial arts record ==
Amateur record breakdown		
6 matches	5 wins	1 loss
By knockout	0	1
By submission	4	0
By decision	1	0

Res.	Record	Opponent	Method	Event	Date	Round	Time	Location	Notes
Win	5–1	Joe Jordan	Decision (unanimous)	ECT: 2001 US National Championships	January 5, 2002	2	5:00	Davenport, Iowa, United States	Became Extreme Trials 2001 National Lightweight MMA Champion.
Win	4–1	Tim Hernandez	Submission (armbar)	ECT: 2001 US National Championships	January 5, 2002	3	1:20	Davenport, Iowa, United States	
Win	3–1	Jason Halderman	Submission (armbar)	EC: Extreme Challenge Trials	August 25, 2001	1	2:42	Great Falls, Montana, United States	Won EC Regional Amateur Championship.
Win	2–1	Michael Rooney	Submission (heel hook)	EC: Extreme Challenge Trials	August 25, 2001	1	1:06	Cincinnati, Ohio, United States	
Win	1–1	Kurt Kindred	Submission (calf-slicer)	EC: Extreme Challenge Trials	August 25, 2001	2	4:51	Cincinnati, Ohio, United States	
Loss	0–1	Kurt Pellegrino	TKO (doctor stoppage)	MD2: Mass Destruction 2	June 23, 2001	1	5:06	Springfield, Massachusetts, United States	

== Professional boxing record ==
1 fight	0 wins	1 loss
By knockout	0	1
By decision	0	0

No.	Result	Record	Opponent	Method	Round, time	Date	Location	Notes
1	Loss	0–1	(United States) Nick Brooks	KO	1 (4)	Feb 18, 2005	(United States) Memorial Civic Auditorium, Stockton, California, U.S.	

== See also ==
- List of vegans

Preceded by Takumi Nakayama	King of the Cage Lightweight champion October 29, 2005 – January 19, 2007	Succeeded by Clay French
