= Matt Arroyo =

American mixed martial arts fighter

- Born: September 1, 1982 (age 44); Cobleskill, New York, U.S.
- Other names: No Regard
- Height: 6 ft 0 in (1.83 m)
- Weight: 170 lb (77 kg; 12 st)
- Division: Welterweight
- Fighting out of: Tampa, Florida
- Team: Gracie Tampa South
- Rank: Black belt in Brazilian Jiu-Jitsu under Rob Kahn
- Years active: 2006–2009

Mixed martial arts record
- Total: 6
- Wins: 3
- By submission: 3
- Losses: 3
- By knockout: 2
- By decision: 1

Other information
- Notable students: Matt Frevola; Billy Quarantillo
- Mixed martial arts record from Sherdog

Matt Arroyo (born September 1, 1982) is an American former professional mixed martial artist. He was featured on the Ultimate Fighting Championship reality television show The Ultimate Fighter: Team Hughes vs. Team Serra, fighting on Team Serra. He fights out of Tampa, Florida with Gracie Tampa, under Royce Gracie black belt Rob Kahn.

== Mixed martial arts career ==
=== The Ultimate Fighter ===
In his first bout of the competition, Arroyo was able to submit Dorian Price via rear naked choke in the first round. After losing a coin toss to Troy Mandaloniz, Arroyo was going to train with Team Hughes, but he and Richie Hightower both decided to continue training with Team Serra. Matt Hughes cornered his quarterfinal fight with Mandaloniz, whom he defeated via armbar in the first round.

During the coaches' bowling competition, Arroyo successfully coached Matt Serra to victory over Matt Hughes.

While preparing for his semifinal match vs. Mac Danzig, Arroyo sustained a rib injury and had to withdraw from the competition, prompting Dana White to select John Kolosci as his replacement. Arroyo went on to defeat John Kolosci at The Ultimate Finale 6 via submission (armbar) at 4:42 of the first round.

=== UFC career ===
After the end of the show, Arroyo was given a fight against John Kolosci at The Ultimate Finale 6. Arroyo won by submission via armbar in the first round. He then had a rematch against Matt Brown at The Ultimate Finale 7. Arroyo lost the bout by TKO in the second round. He lost to Dan Cramer at UFC 94: St-Pierre vs. Penn 2, by split decision. After the loss, Arroyo was released from the UFC.

Arroyo appears as a playable character in the video game UFC Undisputed 2009.

== Personal life ==
Arroyo holds a Bachelor of Science degree from The University of Tampa, where he was also the president of his fraternity, Pi Kappa Phi. After college he sold life insurance for a year before committing himself to fighting full-time.

He is currently very active in Brazilian Jiu-Jitsu tournaments. He has recently opened up his own MMA academy known as Gracie Tampa South with his mentor Rob Kahn. On December 30, 2009, Arroyo received his black belt in BJJ under Rob Kahn.

== Championships and accomplishments ==
- Ultimate Fighting Championship
  - Submission of the Night (One time) vs. John Kolosci
  - UFC.com Awards
    - 2007: Ranked #9 Submission of the Year vs. John Kolosci

== Mixed martial arts record ==
Professional record breakdown
6 matches	3 wins	3 losses
By knockout	0	2
By submission	3	0
By decision	0	1

Res.	Record	Opponent	Method	Event	Date	Round	Time	Location	Notes
Loss	3–3	Dan Cramer	Decision (split)	UFC 94	January 31, 2009	3	5:00	Las Vegas, Nevada, United States	
Loss	3–2	Matt Brown	TKO (punches)	The Ultimate Fighter 7 Finale	June 21, 2008	2	3:40	Las Vegas, Nevada, United States	
Win	3–1	John Kolosci	Submission (armbar)	The Ultimate Fighter 6 Finale	December 8, 2007	1	4:42	Las Vegas, Nevada, United States	Submission of the Night.
Win	2–1	Ariel Pena	Submission (triangle choke)	Real Fighting Championships 8: Invasion of the Cage	February 24, 2007	1	1:39	Tampa, Florida, United States	
Loss	1–1	Matt Brown	TKO (punches)	Real Fighting Championships 7: Night of Champions	November 4, 2006	2	1:54	Tampa, Florida, United States	
Win	1–0	Naeem Munir	Submission (rear-naked choke)	Combat Fighting Championship 2	September 23, 2006	1	0:56	Orlando, Florida, United States	

== See also ==
- List of male mixed martial artists
