= Tom Speer =

American mixed martial arts fighter (born 1984)

- Born: August 20, 1984 (age 42); Elgin, Minnesota, United States
- Other names: The Fire-Haired Farmboy
- Height: 5 ft 10 in (1.78 m)
- Weight: 186 lb (84 kg; 13.3 st)
- Division: Middleweight; Welterweight
- Stance: Orthodox
- Fighting out of: Elgin, Minnesota, United States
- Rank: Blue belt in Brazilian Jiu-Jitsu
- Years active: 2005–2013

Mixed martial arts record
- Total: 28
- Wins: 21
- By knockout: 9
- By submission: 7
- By decision: 5
- Losses: 7
- By knockout: 3
- By submission: 3
- By decision: 1

Other information
- Mixed martial arts record from Sherdog

Thomas Speer (born August 20, 1984) is a retired American mixed martial artist. A professional competitor from 2005 until 2013, he received national exposure on The Ultimate Fighter 6: Team Hughes vs. Team Serra, fighting as a member of Team Hughes and his subsequent stint in the UFC. Speer also competed in the WEC and Cage Warriors.

== Background ==
Born and raised on a crop and dairy farm in Elgin, Minnesota, Speer was a star athlete at Elgin Millville High School, where he was an All-State cornerback in football, received four varsity letters in basketball, and reached the state tournament in wrestling during his senior year. After graduating in 2003, Speer continued to develop his wrestling skills and also began competing in mixed martial arts in the local circuit. On May 29, 2015 Speer married Katie Kirckof.

== Mixed martial arts career ==
=== The Ultimate Fighter ===
While on The Ultimate Fighter, Speer defeated Jon Koppenhaver and Ben Saunders, both by unanimous decision. In his semifinal bout, he defeated George Sotiropoulos by KO in the first round, advancing him into the finals on December 8, 2007, to face fellow Team Hughes member Mac Danzig. Speer fought Danzig at The Ultimate Fighter: Team Hughes vs Team Serra Finale, and lost via rear-naked choke at 2:01 of the first round.

On April 2, 2008 at UFC Fight Night 13, Speer lost to Anthony Johnson by KO in the first round. Speer was then released by the UFC after this loss.

=== Independent Promotions ===
Speer announced his retirement from professional fighting after suffering a loss to Beau Baker in the Cagefest Xtreme 6 show in Norfolk, Virginia. Speer was a late replacement for an injured Shonie Carter.

Speer has since returned to fighting professionally, defeating Jay Ellis by TKO in the first round at the Extreme Challenge 127 on May 30, 2009.

Speer fought Ryan Ford at TFC 10. He lost the fight in the first round via rear-naked choke submission.

Speer faced Mats Nilsson on February 11, 2012 at Cage Warriors Fight Night 3, in which he lost via arm triangle submission.

On April 5, 2013, Speer defeated Strikeforce Vet Lumumba Sayers at MFW: 2 via rear-naked choke submission in round one.

== Mixed martial arts record ==
Professional record breakdown
28 matches	21 wins	7 losses
By knockout	9	3
By submission	7	3
By decision	5	1
Draws	0	
No contests	0	

Res.	Record	Opponent	Method	Event	Date	Round	Time	Location	Notes
Win	21–7	Lumumba Sayers	Submission (rear-naked choke)	MFW: Made For War 2	April 5, 2013	1	3:39	Castle Rock, Colorado, United States	Middleweight bout.
Loss	20–7	Jeremy Kimball	TKO (punches)	MFW: Made For War 1	October 13, 2012	2	2:29	Castle Rock, Colorado, United States	Middleweight bout.
Win	20–6	Kevin Burns	Decision (split)	Brutaal: Fight Night	May 11, 2012	3	5:00	Tama, Iowa, United States	
Loss	19–6	Mats Nilsson	Submission (arm-triangle choke)	Cage Warriors Fight Night 3	February 11, 2012	2	4:17	Beirut, Lebanon	Middleweight bout.
Win	19–5	Indalecio Tat Romero	Decision (unanimous)	Extreme Challenge 188: Larson vs. Davila	July 23, 2011	3	5:00	Minneapolis, Minnesota, United States	
Win	18–5	Ryan Williams	Submission (triangle choke)	Extreme Challenge 170	December 11, 2010	3	2:48	Minneapolis, Minnesota, United States	
Win	17–5	Ashkan Morvari	Decision (unanimous)	RG: Rochester Gladiators	October 2, 2010	3	5:00	Rochester, Minnesota, United States	
Win	16–5	Jeremy Lafferty	TKO (submission to punches)	RG: Rochester Gladiators	May 15, 2010	1	2:02	Rochester, Minnesota, United States	
Loss	15–5	Ryan Ford	Submission (rear-naked choke)	TFC 10: High Voltage	March 19, 2010	1	4:29	Edmonton, Alberta, Canada	For the TFC Welterweight Championship.
Win	15–4	Travis Perzynski	Decision (unanimous)	FN: Fight Nation	October 3, 2009	3	5:00	Rochester, Minnesota, United States	
Win	14–4	Jay Ellis	TKO (punches)	Extreme Challenge 128	May 30, 2009	1	2:53	Rochester, Minnesota, United States	
Loss	13–4	Beau Baker	Decision (unanimous)	Cagefest Xtreme Evolution	November 15, 2008	3	5:00	Norfolk, Virginia, United States	
Win	13–3	Geno Roderick	Submission (rear-naked choke)	CCCW: Capital City Cage Wars	November 1, 2008	1	3:25	Springfield, Illinois, United States	
Win	12–3	Joe Julianelle	TKO (punches)	10–4: Thunder	October 4, 2008	1	0:50	Rochester, Minnesota, United States	
Loss	11–3	Anthony Johnson	KO (punches)	UFC Fight Night 13	April 2, 2008	1	0:51	Broomfield, Colorado, United States	
Loss	11–2	Mac Danzig	Submission (rear-naked choke)	The Ultimate Fighter: Team Hughes vs. Team Serra Finale	December 8, 2007	1	2:01	Las Vegas, Nevada, United States	The Ultimate Fighter: Team Hughes vs Team Serra Tournament Final.
Win	11–1	Sidney Silva	KO (punch)	WEC 27	May 12, 2007	1	4:33	Las Vegas, Nevada, United States	
Win	10–1	Robert Farley	TKO (punches)	Extreme Challenge 76	March 31, 2007	1	2:23	Sloan, Iowa, United States	
Win	9–1	Andy Normington	TKO (submission to punches)	Ultimate Combat Sports 19: Battle at the Barn	March 24, 2007	1	N/A	Rochester, Minnesota, United States	
Win	8–1	Dan Washburn	TKO (submission to punches)	Ultimate Combat Sports 18: Battle at the Barn	January 20, 2007	1	N/A	Rochester, Minnesota, United States	
Win	7–1	Sean Huffman	TKO (corner stoppage)	Extreme Challenge 72	October 21, 2006	1	5:00	Minnesota, United States	
Loss	6–1	John Meyer	TKO (punches)	Extreme Challenge 70	July 30, 2006	3	N/A	Hayward, Wisconsin, United States	
Win	6–0	Jim Abrille	TKO (corner stoppage)	Full Throttle 7	June 10, 2006	1	5:00	Georgia, United States	
Win	5–0	Rob Marcks	TKO (corner stoppage)	Coliseum: Coliseum 2	December 28, 2005	1	N/A	Rochester, Minnesota, United States	
Win	4–0	Gerald Pearson	TKO (slam)	ICE 18: International Combat Events 18	December 3, 2005	2	N/A	Fairfield, Ohio, United States	
Win	3–0	Adam Hill	TKO (punches)	Ultimate Combat Sports 10: Battle at the Barn	September 10, 2005	2	N/A	Rochester, Minnesota, United States	
Win	2–0	Mike van Meer	Decision (unanimous)	Ultimate Combat Sports: Throwdown at the T-Bar	July 30, 2005	3	5:00	Ellsworth, Minnesota, United States	
Win	1–0	Jose Frausto	Submission (arm-triangle choke)	Ultimate Combat Sports 9: Battle at the Barn	May 7, 2005	1	N/A	Rochester, Minnesota, United States	
