= Roman Mitichyan =

Armenian actor and mixed martial arts fighter

- Born: Vanadzor, Armenian Soviet Socialist Republic
- Other names: The Emperor
- Nationality: Armenian; American
- Height: 178 cm (5 ft 10 in)
- Weight: 77 kg (170 lb)
- Division: Welterweight
- Style: Wrestling, Sambo, Judo
- Fighting out of: North Hollywood, California, U.S.

Mixed martial arts record
- Total: 11
- Wins: 8
- By knockout: 1
- By submission: 5
- By decision: 2
- Losses: 3
- By knockout: 2
- By submission: 1

Other information
- Mixed martial arts record from Sherdog

Roman Mitichyan is an Armenian-American professional mixed martial artist, actor and stuntman. He briefly appeared on Spike TV's reality show The Ultimate Fighter: Team Hughes vs. Team Serra, as a part of Team Serra, but was forced to leave the show due to injury.

== Biography ==
Mitichyan was born in Vanadzor. He started training at the age of eight in Wrestling, before switching to training in Sambo and Judo under Baxshik Saroyan. Mitichyan and his family moved to America in 1997, and he started training at the Hayastan Judo Club under Gene Lebell and Gokor Chivichyan. In 2000, he settled in Los Angeles with the intention of pursuing an acting career.

== MMA career ==
Mitichyan amassed a 4–1 MMA record before appearing on The Ultimate Fighter: Team Hughes vs. Team Serra. He broke his elbow during the pre-team selection evaluation, and was immediately removed from the show before he had an opportunity to fight. However, he was brought back to fight on the show's finale, where he defeated Dorian Price via ankle lock submission in only 23 seconds, earning him a contract with the UFC. In his following fight at UFC Fight Night 13, he was defeated by fellow TUF 6 alumnus George Sotiropoulos via TKO in the second round, thus resulting in the UFC cutting ties with him.

== Acting career ==
Roman has performed roles and stunts in various films and television shows, including NUMB3RS, Dexter, Felon, 24, NCIS: Los Angeles, Takers, CSI: Miami, Sons of Anarchy, NCIS, CSI: NY, John Wick, Furious 7, Escape Plan 2: Hades, and Vice.

== Mixed martial arts record ==
Professional record breakdown
11 matches	8 wins	3 losses
By knockout	1	2
By submission	5	1
By decision	2	0

Res.	Record	Opponent	Method	Event	Date	Round	Time	Location	Notes
Win	8–3	William Sriyapai	Submission (triangle choke)	Lights Out Promotions - Chaos at the Casino	May 5, 2012	1	0:52	Inglewood, California, United States	
Win	7–3	Preston Scharf	Decision (unanimous)	MEZ Fights	June 12, 2010	3	3:00	Hollywood, California, United States	
Win	6–3	Mike Dolce	Decision (unanimous)	Call to Arms - Called Out Fights	August 15, 2009	3	5:00	Ontario, California, United States	
Loss	5–3	Jason Meaders	KO	California Xtreme Fighting	January 29, 2009	3	2:41	El Monte, California, United States	
Loss	5–2	George Sotiropoulos	TKO (punches)	UFC Fight Night 13	April 2, 2008	2	2:24	Broomfield, Colorado, United States	
Win	5–1	Dorian Price	Submission (Achilles lock)	The Ultimate Fighter 6 Finale	December 8, 2007	1	0:23	Las Vegas, Nevada, United States	
Win	4–1	Mike Robles	KO (knee)	WTFC	May 3, 2007	3	3:50	Highland, California, United States	
Win	3–1	Mike Penalber	Submission (rear naked choke)	California Xtreme Fighting 3	August 19, 2006	1	3:50	Upland, California, United States	
Loss	2–1	James Wilks	Submission (armbar)	Universal Above Ground Fighting: Ultimate Cage Fighting 4	October 12, 2003	2	N/A	Upland, California, United States	
Win	2–0	Brad Mohler	Submission (heel hook)	Reality Submission Fighting: Shooto Challenge	October 3, 2003	1	N/A	Belleville, Illinois, United States	
Win	1–0	Bong Fedalizo	Submission (armbar)	Kage Kombat 14	April 5, 1999	1	0:52	Los Angeles, California, United States	

== Selected filmography ==
=== Film ===
Year	Title	Role	Notes
2008	Felon	Swamper Deputy	
2010	Takers	Russian #3	
2012	Argo	Iranian Comiteh in Truck	
2014	John Wick	Red Circle Security	
2015	Furious 7	Khalid	
2015	Extraction	Dmitri	
2016	War Dogs	Iraqi Insurgent	
2016	The Promise	Van	
2018	Escape Plan 2: Hades	Bookstore Clerk	
2018	Vice	Cleric	
2019	John Wick 3: Parabellum	Roma	

=== Television ===
Year	Title	Role	Notes
2006–2008	NUMB3RS	Kaleem Rafiq / Ken Benswrth / Qassim	3 episodes
2007	Dexter	Santos Jimenez	Episode: "The Dark Defender"
2008	The Shield	Armenian Thug	Episode: "Money Shot"
2010	24	Mikhail	2 episodes
2010–2019	NCIS: Los Angeles	Azteca Guard / Baddie / Guard / ISIS Man / Terrorist / Stalker / Iranian / Serbian / Bodyguard #2	9 episodes
2011	CSI: Miami	Cole Gryder	Episode: "Caged"
2011	Sons of Anarchy	Ivo	Episode: "Out"
2012, 2017	NCIS	Afghani / Enemy Fighter	2 episodes
2013	CSI: NY	Egyptian Thug	Episode: "Seth and Apep"
2015–2018	Hawaii Five-0	Guard / Shooter / Thug / Gunman	4 episodes
2015	Bones	Heavy	Episode: "The Murder in the Middle East"
2015	Agent X	Good Dignitary	Episode: "Fidelity"
2016	Castle	Rayas Thug	Episode: "Much Ado About Murder"
2016	Person of Interest	Heavy	Episode: "ShotSeeker"
2016	Fear the Walking Dead	Infected Bartender	Episode: "Pablo & Jessica"
2017	The Blacklist: Redemption	National Police Officer	Episode: "Kevin Jensen"
2017	SEAL Team	SUV Driver	Episode: "The Spinning Wheel"
2019	The Morning Show	Sam Rudo	4 episodes
