= George Sotiropoulos =

Australian martial artist (born 1977)

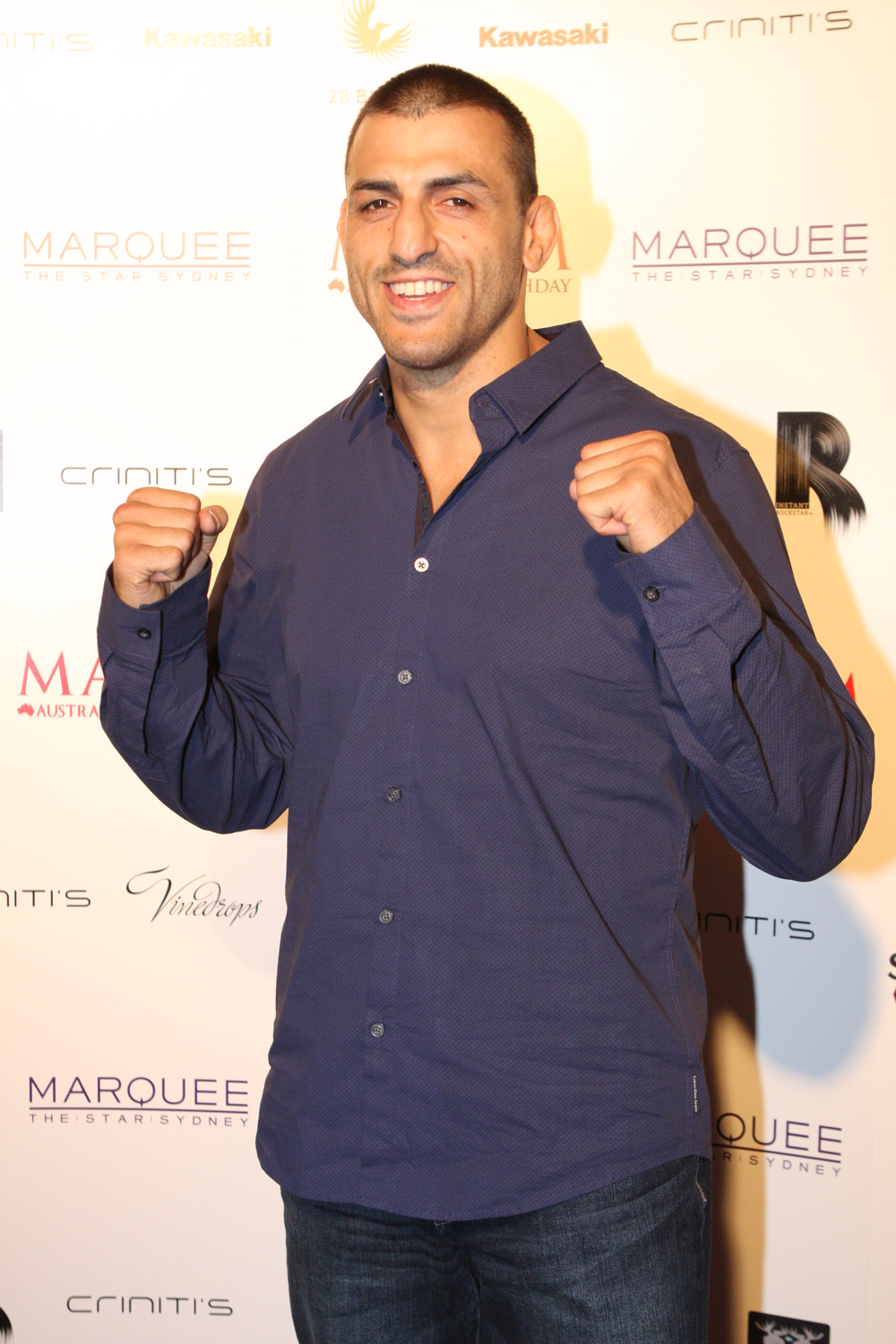
- Born: 9 July 1977 (age 49); Geelong, Victoria, Australia
- Height: 5 ft 10 in (1.78 m)
- Weight: 155 lb (70 kg; 11.1 st)
- Division: Lightweight (2009–present); Welterweight (2007–2008)
- Reach: 71 in (180 cm)
- Stance: Orthodox
- Team: Impact Jiu-jitsu; American Top Team (2012–2016); Omega Jiu Jitsu & MMA (2018–present)
- Rank: 2nd degree black belt in Brazilian jiu-jitsu under Fabiano Scherner
- Years active: 2004–2014, 2023

Professional boxing record
- Total: 1
- Wins: 1
- Losses: 0

Mixed martial arts record
- Total: 22
- Wins: 14
- By knockout: 1
- By submission: 8
- By decision: 5
- Losses: 7
- By knockout: 2
- By decision: 4
- By disqualification: 1
- No contests: 1

Other information
- University: Victoria University, Melbourne
- Website: www.georgesotiropoulos.com
- Boxing record from BoxRec
- Mixed martial arts record from Sherdog

George Sotiropoulos (born 9 July 1977) is an Australian former professional mixed martial artist who most notably fought in the Ultimate Fighting Championship (UFC) in their Lightweight division. He is well known for appearing as a fighter on the TV show The Ultimate Fighter: Team Hughes vs. Team Serra, fighting on Team Serra and as the coach for Team Australia on The Ultimate Fighter: The Smashes.

== Background ==
Sotiropoulos grew up in Geelong, Victoria, changing schools multiple times due to occasional physical altercations he got into. Despite the scuffles, Sotiropoulos fared well in his studies and got his associate's diploma in international trade from Victoria University, Melbourne. Subsequently, he graduated with bachelor's degree in banking and finance, and international trade in 2001.

Sotiropoulos began training in Brazilian jiu-jitsu in 1997 at the age of 19, and was promoted to black belt in 2004. In 2003 and 2007, he represented Australia in the Submission Wrestling World Championships. Sotiropoulos has also competed in amateur boxing, and in 2004, won a Victorian State Amateur Boxing Championship.

== Mixed martial arts career ==
Prior to his MMA career in the UFC, Sotiropoulos trained with veteran UFC and PRIDE fighter Enson Inoue. The two met during a winning bout Sotiropoulos had with Sergio Lourenço in Guam. He has remained affiliated with Enson Inoue's Purebred gyms throughout his career since then.

Following his appearance on The Ultimate Fighter: Team Hughes vs. Team Serra, Sotiropoulos moved to Long Island, NY to train at with Matt Serra Sotiropoulos then relocated to Las Vegas, Nevada, and trained at Xtreme Couture. During this time period he also trained at 10th Planet Jiu-Jitsu with Eddie Bravo.

=== Early career ===
Sotiropoulos made his professional debut in 2004 against fellow Australian Gavin Murie, in which Sotiropoulos was able to win via armbar submission in the first round. He went on to win two more fights until his first career loss via split decision to Kyle Noke in 2005, one year later he was able to avenge his first loss by defeating Noke by unanimous decision. Sotiropoulos went on to have a 7–2 record in small MMA organizations, until he was invited to participate in The Ultimate Fighter in 2007.

=== The Ultimate Fighter ===
Sotiropoulos defeated Jared Rollins in the first round of the competition by KO. He went on to defeat Richie Hightower in the quarterfinals via submission due to a kimura. Sotiropoulos was then defeated by Tom Speer in the semi-finals by knockout, shortly after an accidental thumb to the eye.

=== Ultimate Fighting Championship ===
Sotiropoulos defeated Billy Miles at The Ultimate Fighter: Team Hughes vs Team Serra Finale via submission (rear-naked choke) at 1:36 of the first round.

Sotiropoulos defeated Roman Mitichyan at UFC Fight Night 13 on 2 April 2008 by TKO in the second round.

He was scheduled to fight judoka Karo Parisyan at UFC 87, however Sotiropoulos was forced to withdraw due to injury.

Sotiropoulos was then expected to face Matt Grice at UFC Fight Night 17, but was forced to withdraw due to another injury and was replaced by Matt Veach.

==== Move down to lightweight ====
After an 18-month break in his career, Sotiropoulos switched weight classes, and was expected to face Rob Emerson at UFC 101 on 8 August 2009. However, Emerson withdrew from the bout due to a cut and was replaced by George Roop. During the bout, he showcased his high level grappling skills, passing Roop's guard with ease. Sotiropoulos eventually forced the tap out with a kimura lock in the second round.

Sotiropoulos defeated Ultimate Fighter 9 alumni Jason Dent in the second round via armbar submission on 21 November 2009, at UFC 106. In a post-fight interview following the win, Sotiropoulos stated his desire to compete at the UFC 110 card, in Sydney, Australia. Sotiropoulos' wish was granted and faced Joe Stevenson on 21 February 2010 at UFC 110. Making his first appearance on the main card of a UFC pay-per-view event, Sotiropoulos improved to 5–0 in the UFC as he defeated Stevenson via unanimous decision (30–27, 30–27, 30–27) in a dominant performance, prompting Dana White to say that Sotiropoulos was "in the mix" for a title shot. The fight earned Sotiropoulos his first Fight of the Night award in the UFC.

Sotiropoulos fought Kurt Pellegrino at UFC 116 on 3 July 2010, and won by a commanding unanimous decision.

Sotiropoulos then faced Joe Lauzon on 20 November 2010 at UFC 123. Sotiropoulos survived a fast start by his opponent, thus gassing Lauzon in one round, and allowing Sotiropoulos to dominate the next round, winning by kimura in the second round in a bout that won Fight of the Night honors. The win pushed Sotiropoulos to a perfect 7–0 record in the UFC and established him as one of the top contenders in the UFC's lightweight division.

==== Losing streak and release ====
Sotiropoulos suffered his first UFC loss to Dennis Siver via unanimous decision at UFC 127. Sotiropoulos was unable to take the fight to the ground and was forced to strike with the German Kickboxing Champion Siver. The loss setback Sotiropoulos' chances of a title shot.

Sotiropoulos was expected to face Evan Dunham on 2 July 2011 at UFC 132. However, Dunham was forced out of the bout with an injury, and replaced by Rafael dos Anjos. Sotiropoulos was knocked out just 59 seconds into the first round.

Sotiropoulos was expected to face former PRIDE Lightweight Champion Takanori Gomi on 26 February 2012 at UFC 144. However, Sotiropoulos was forced out of the bout with an injury and replaced by Eiji Mitsuoka.

In July 2012 Sotiropoulos was confirmed as the Australian coach for The Ultimate Fighter: The Smashes, and faced Ross Pearson on 15 December 2012 at the finale - UFC on FX 6. Pearson dominated him throughout the fight, and although he narrowly avoiding being knocked out several times, Sotiropoulos was visibly rocked in all three rounds; being knocked down in two of them. He eventually lost the fight via third-round TKO from Pearson.

Sotiropoulos faced Hawaiian K. J. Noons on 19 October 2013 at UFC 166. He lost the fight via unanimous decision.

After losing four in a row, Sotiropoulos was released from his UFC contract on 18 December 2013.

=== Titan Fighting Championship ===
On 22 January 2014 it was announced that Sotiropoulos had signed a four-fight contract with Titan Fighting Championship and was expected to debut on 25 April at Titan FC 28 against Mike Ricci however Ricci withdrew from the bout due to injury. The bout was rescheduled and took place at Titan FC 29 on 22 August 2014. He lost the fight via unanimous decision.

Almost a decade removed from his previous bout, Sotiropoulos faced Josh Togo at HEX Fight Series 26 on 26 May 2023. The bout ended in a no contest in the second round after an accidental eye poke rendered Togo unable to continue.

== Other media ==
Sotiropoulous is featured in UFC Undisputed 3 as a Lightweight fighter alongside the likes of Clay Guida, Dennis Siver, Joe Lauzon and Frankie Edgar.

== Personal life ==
After years of living in Washington state and New York City, Sotiropoulos moved to Melbourne, Australia in 2016 and currently manages his own MMA gym, Omega Jiu-Jitsu & MMA there.

== Championships and accomplishments ==
- Ultimate Fighting Championship
  - Fight of the Night (Two times) vs. Joe Stevenson and Joe Lauzon
  - UFC.com Awards
    - 2010: Ranked #4 Fighter of the Year & Ranked #7 Fight of the Year vs. Joe Lauzon

== Mixed martial arts record ==
Professional record breakdown
22 matches	14 wins	7 losses
By knockout	1	2
By submission	8	0
By decision	5	4
By disqualification	0	1
No contests	1	

Res.	Record	Opponent	Method	Event	Date	Round	Time	Location	Notes
NC	14–7 (1)	Josh Togo	NC (accidental eye poke)	HEX Fight Series 26	26 May 2023	2	N/A	Kensington, Australia	Accidental eye poke rendered Togo unable to continue.
Loss	14–7	Mike Ricci	Decision (unanimous)	Titan FC 29	22 August 2014	3	5:00	Fayetteville, North Carolina, United States	
Loss	14–6	K. J. Noons	Decision (unanimous)	UFC 166	19 October 2013	3	5:00	Houston, Texas, United States	
Loss	14–5	Ross Pearson	TKO (punches)	UFC on FX: Sotiropoulos vs. Pearson	15 December 2012	3	0:41	Gold Coast, Australia	
Loss	14–4	Rafael dos Anjos	KO (punch)	UFC 132	2 July 2011	1	0:59	Las Vegas, Nevada, United States	
Loss	14–3	Dennis Siver	Decision (unanimous)	UFC 127	27 February 2011	3	5:00	Sydney, Australia	
Win	14–2	Joe Lauzon	Submission (kimura)	UFC 123	20 November 2010	2	2:43	Auburn Hills, Michigan, United States	Fight of the Night.
Win	13–2	Kurt Pellegrino	Decision (unanimous)	UFC 116	3 July 2010	3	5:00	Las Vegas, Nevada, United States	
Win	12–2	Joe Stevenson	Decision (unanimous)	UFC 110	21 February 2010	3	5:00	Sydney, Australia	Fight of the Night.
Win	11–2	Jason Dent	Submission (armbar)	UFC 106	21 November 2009	2	4:35	Las Vegas, Nevada, United States	
Win	10–2	George Roop	Submission (kimura)	UFC 101	8 August 2009	2	1:59	Philadelphia, Pennsylvania, United States	Return to Lightweight.
Win	9–2	Roman Mitichyan	TKO (punches)	UFC Fight Night: Florian vs. Lauzon	2 April 2008	2	2:24	Broomfield, Colorado, United States	
Win	8–2	Billy Miles	Submission (rear-naked choke)	The Ultimate Fighter 6 Finale	8 December 2007	1	1:36	Las Vegas, Nevada, United States	
Win	7–2	Cha Jung-hwan	Submission (armbar)	Spirit MC 11	22 April 2007	2	3:27	Seoul, South Korea	Catchweight (176 lb) bout.
Loss	6–2	Shinya Aoki	DQ (groin kick)	Shooto: Champion Carnival	14 October 2006	2	0:05	Yokohama, Japan	Catchweight (163 lb) bout.
Win	6–1	Shigetoshi Iwase	Decision (unanimous)	Kokoro: Kill Or Be Killed	15 August 2006	2	5:00	Tokyo, Japan	
Win	5–1	Kyle Noke	Decision (unanimous)	Warriors Realm FC 5	25 February 2006	5	5:00	Sydney, Australia	Won the Warriors Realm Welterweight Championship.
Win	4–1	Sergio Lourenco	Decision (unanimous)	Fury Full Contact Fighting 5	27 January 2006	3	5:00	Mangilao, Guam	
Loss	3–1	Kyle Noke	Decision (split)	Warriors Realm 4	2 July 2005	3	5:00	Sydney, Australia	
Win	3–0	Marcio Bittencourt	Submission (rear-naked choke)	Xplosion Super Fight 2004: Oceania vs World	18 December 2004	1	3:30	Gold Coast, Australia	Lightweight bout.
Win	2–0	Kelly Jacobs	Submission (armbar)	Warriors Realm FC 2	10 December 2004	1	4:12	Sunshine Coast, Australia	Welterweight debut.
Win	1–0	Gavin Murie	Submission (armbar)	XFC Australia 6	20 November 2004	1	1:28	Gold Coast, Australia	Lightweight debut.

== Professional boxing record ==
1 fight	1 win	0 losses
By decision	1	0

No.	Result	Record	Opponent	Type	Round, time	Date	Location	Notes
1	Win	1–0	(Australia) Joel Casey	UD	6	13 April 2007	Darebin Sports & Leisure Centre, Reservoir, Victoria, Australia	
