= John Kolosci =

American mixed martial arts fighter

- Born: November 26, 1974 (age 51); Portage, Indiana, United States
- Nationality: American
- Height: 5 ft 11 in (1.80 m)
- Weight: 178.5 lb (81.0 kg; 12.75 st)
- Division: Light Heavyweight; Middleweight; Welterweight; Lightweight
- Fighting out of: Portage, Indiana, United States
- Years active: 2003-2011

Mixed martial arts record
- Total: 24
- Wins: 15
- By knockout: 3
- By submission: 5
- By decision: 7
- Losses: 9
- By knockout: 2
- By submission: 5
- By decision: 2

Other information
- Mixed martial arts record from Sherdog

John Kolosci (born November 26, 1974) is a retired American mixed martial artist. A professional from 2003 until 2011, he competed for the UFC, Bellator, Strikeforce, the XFC, and was a competitor on The Ultimate Fighter, fighting for Team Serra.

== The Ultimate Fighter ==
Kolosci was able to defeat his first round opponent, Billy Miles, via Guillotine choke in the first round. In the second round, he fought Mac Danzig and was defeated by Rear naked choke in the first round, eliminating him from contention.

In the semifinal round, fighter Matt Arroyo suffered a rib injury and elected to pull out of the competition. In a meeting to decide his replacement, Kolosci was the only fighter to express enthusiasm at the prospect of fighting Danzig and was granted the opportunity by UFC president Dana White. In the rematch, Danzig was able to secure a victory, once again by rear naked choke in round 1.

At The Ultimate Fighter Finale, Kolosci lost to Matt Arroyo via armbar submission at 4:42 of the first round.

== Personal life ==
John and his girlfriend Cathy were married on November 20, 2009, in the ring during the intermission of the Hoosier Fight Club's premier night.

== Mixed martial arts record ==
Professional record breakdown
24 matches	15 wins	9 losses
By knockout	3	2
By submission	5	5
By decision	7	2
By disqualification	0	0
Unknown	0	0
Draws	0	
No contests	0	

Res.	Record	Opponent	Method	Event	Date	Round	Time	Location	Notes
Loss	15–9	Ryan Thomas	Submission (reverse triangle choke)	XFC 15: Tribute	December 2, 2011	1	4:46	Tampa, Florida, United States	Catchweight (180 lbs) bout.
Win	15–8	Dan Bolden	Decision (split)	Hoosier FC 9: Fall Brawl	November 5, 2011	3	5:00	Valparaiso, Indiana, United States	
Loss	14–8	Forrest Petz	TKO (strikes)	Hoosier FC 7: Validation	April 9, 2011	2	0:57	Valparaiso, Indiana, United States	
Loss	14–7	Kenny Robertson	Submission (americana)	Bellator 25	August 19, 2010	2	2:41	Chicago, Illinois, United States	
Win	14–6	Luigi Fioravanti	Submission (rear-naked choke)	Hoosier FC 4: Showdown at the Steel Yard	June 11, 2010	1	0:42	Gary, Indiana, United States	
Win	13–6	William Hill	Decision (split)	Hoosier FC 2: It's On	January 2, 2010	3	5:00	Hammond, Indiana, United States	
Loss	12–6	Shamar Bailey	Decision (unanimous)	Strikeforce: Fedor vs. Rogers	November 7, 2009	3	5:00	Hoffman Estates, Illinois, United States	
Win	12–5	Scott Sands	Decision (unanimous)	Duneland Classic 6	September 12, 2009	3	5:00	Crown Point, Indiana, United States	
Win	11–5	Jeff Hanks	Submission (anaconda choke)	LDIL: Lockdown in Lowell	June 26, 2009	1	N/A	Lowell, Indiana, United States	
Win	10–5	Rocky France	Decision (majority)	GECF 13: Gladiator Elite Cage Fighting 13	May 2, 2009	3	5:00	Warsaw, Indiana, United States	
Win	9–5	Jay Finnegan	Submission (anaconda choke)	Cage Rage: Kokomo	April 10, 2009	1	2:01	Kokomo, Indiana, United States	
Loss	8–5	Matt Arroyo	Submission (armbar)	The Ultimate Fighter 6 Finale	December 8, 2007	1	4:42	Las Vegas, Nevada, United States	Return to Welterweight.
Loss	8–4	William Hill	TKO (punches)	IFC: Road to Global Domination	March 4, 2007	1	1:11	Belton, Texas, United States	Light Heavyweight debut.
Win	8–3	Andre Luis Novoes Pimenta	Decision (split)	International MMA Competition 1: Attack	November 4, 2006	3	N/A	Chicago, Illinois, United States	
Loss	7–3	Bryan Rafiq	Submission (guillotine choke)	MARS 4: New Deal	August 26, 2006	1	2:46	Tokyo, Japan, Japan	
Win	7–2	Seth Kleinbeck	Decision (unanimous)	Duneland Classic 4	June 17, 2006	3	N/A	Portage, Indiana, United States	
Win	6–2	Eric Tavares	TKO (punches)	Mix Fighting Championships: Boardwalk Blitz	March 4, 2006	3	3:17	Atlantic City, New Jersey, United States	Return to Middleweight.
Win	5–2	Mike Todorovic	TKO (punches)	SuperBrawl 40	April 30, 2005	2	2:10	Hammond, Indiana, United States	
Win	4–2	John Sivori	Decision (majority)	Euphoria: USA vs. World	February 26, 2005	3	5:00	Atlantic City, New Jersey, United States	Lightweight debut.
Win	3–2	Adam Verkilen	TKO	Xtreme Kage Kombat	October 23, 2004	N/A	N/A	Wisconsin, United States	
Loss	2–2	Pat O'Malley	Decision	Freestyle Combat Challenge 15	June 12, 2004	2	5:00	Wisconsin, United States	
Loss	2–1	Jason Rigsby	Submission (rear-naked choke)	Silverback Classic 18	December 13, 2003	2	N/A	Illinois, United States	
Win	2–0	Brent Calloway	Submission (strikes)	Absolute Fighting Championships 6	December 6, 2003	1	3:58	Fort Lauderdale, Florida, United States	
Win	1–0	Roy Nerzig	Submission (strikes)	Maximum Combat 6	April 12, 2003	1	N/A	Indiana, United States	
