= The Ultimate Fighter =

American reality series and mixed martial arts competition

- Created by: Craig Piligian; Frank Fertitta III; Lorenzo Fertitta; Dana White
- Starring: Dana White; UFC roster
- Country of origin: United States
- No. of seasons: 34
- No. of episodes: 150+ (including 23 live Ultimate Finales)

Production
- Executive producers: Craig Piligian; Gary DeFranco
- Running time: 60 minutes
- Production companies: Pilgrim Films & Television; Ultimate Fighting Productions, LLC

Original release
- Network: Spike TV (2005–2011); FX (2012–2013); Fox Sports 1 (2013–2018); UFC Fight Pass (2014–present); BT Sport (2015–2023); TNT Sports (2023–present); ESPN+ (2021–2025); Paramount+ (since 2026)
- Release: January 17, 2005 – present

The Ultimate Fighter is an American reality television series and mixed martial arts (MMA) competition produced by the Ultimate Fighting Championship (UFC) and Pilgrim Media Group is expected to air on Paramount+ in 2026. It previously aired for fourteen seasons on Spike TV. The show features professional MMA fighters living together in Las Vegas, Nevada, and follows them as they train and compete against each other for a prized six-figure contract with the UFC. The series debuted on January 17, 2005, with its first episode, "The Quest Begins". To date, there have been thirty three seasons of the show, two per calendar year, some years having only one season. Each season features either one or two weight classes in the tournament.

The historic Forrest Griffin vs. Stephan Bonnar fight in the first season drew millions of viewers to the show and launched the sport into the mainstream. Because of this success, The Ultimate Fighter was regarded as instrumental to the survival and expansion of the UFC and mixed martial arts into the mainstream. Many current and past UFC fighters are alumni of the show, with some competitors going on to become coaches in future seasons. The show has undergone multiple format changes since its inception, including the introduction of the wildcard bout. Many winners have gone on to compete for UFC championships with some becoming UFC champions.

== History ==
The Ultimate Fighter was originally an experimental series financed by the former owners of the Ultimate Fighting Championship (UFC), Lorenzo and Frank Fertitta III. The series was aired on Spike TV as a last resort measure to gain mainstream exposure for mixed martial arts (MMA).

During the early days of Spike TV, the channel wanted sports programming, but had no budget for sports licensing fees. Spike TV founder Albie Hecht began a search to find programming with broad appeal that the network could afford. In the end, Spike narrowed its choices down to the UFC and K-1. Hecht flew to Japan to meet with the head of K-1, but the meeting did not go well. Weeks later, Hecht met with Lorenzo Fertitta in Las Vegas. Hecht was impressed by the UFC's celebrity following, its plan to acquire and consolidate smaller promotions into the UFC, and with Dana White's ability to be a "Vince McMahon"-like personality.

Hecht saw K-1 as a safer bet, given it had more international notoriety. He was also not a fan of the grappling aspects of MMA, but the UFC rebuffed his suggestion to change the rules of the sport to accommodate striking. Hecht credits Kevin Kay and his editorial collaboration with the UFC for highlighting the show's story lines, which he believes helped drive its ratings success.

Airing after World Wrestling Entertainment's flagship show WWE Raw, The Ultimate Fighter's debut episode was able to garner a 57% retention rate in viewers from Raw, which was double the usual rate for Spike TV. It is believed by some that WWE's Vince McMahon had to approve The Ultimate Fighter following Raw, but this is incorrect. According to Hecht, McMahon did not have the final say, but given his stature and Raw's' importance to Spike TV at the time, the network wanted McMahon to "be on board" with the program lineup. At the time, Hecht believes the WWE did not see the UFC as a challenge.

The live finale for the first season saw the historic bout of Forrest Griffin vs. Stephan Bonnar. Now widely regarded as the most influential fight in MMA history, the bout took place in what was the first ever MMA event on live and free television. The bout ended in a unanimous decision victory for Griffin and led to the show's renewal on Spike TV. Regarding the success of the show, UFC president Dana White said, "It's amazing to think.... how close we came to not being here today. If it weren't for what these guys did, I don't know if there would even be a UFC. I'll never forget these guys. Ever."

The renewal of the show saw UFC produce two more series, before subsequent renewals. In order to garner more attention for the sport, The Ultimate Fighter utilizes gimmicks: one notable example, in the ninth season, employed a country vs. country theme, with the United States competing against the United Kingdom. These gimmicks enabled the UFC to appeal to fans that had been recently introduced to the sport during UFCs penetration into the European market. The Ultimate Fighter also drew record viewing figures for Spike TV when YouTube sensation Kimbo Slice participated in the tenth season. Slice's fight against veteran Roy Nelson attracted viewers to the sport, drawing an audience of 6.1 million, making it one of the most viewed MMA fights in history.

As part of a new broadcasting relationship between the UFC and Fox Sports, The Ultimate Fighter moved to FX beginning in season 15. Season 14 was the final season of the series to air on Spike, who considered the relationship to be "incredibly beneficial in building both our brands.” In September 2013, the series moved to Fox's new mainstream sports network Fox Sports 1.

Because of the need to keep the fight results secret until the airing of the episode, each fight on The Ultimate Fighter is officially an "exhibition", and as such does not count towards the fighters overall record.

== Selection process ==
=== Seasons 1–4 ===
The Ultimate Fighter uses an elimination tournament format, as highlighted by the season ten bracket.

For the first four seasons, prospective UFC fighters from two different weight classes were selected to compete. The fighters are divided into two teams, irrespective of weight class, with each team coached by a current UFC headliner. The teams then compete (in a manner which varies by season), with the loser being eliminated from the competition. Often, incentives are provided for the team of a winning fighter. This can include the right for their team to select the next matchup, in order to pick off fighters from the opposing team by selecting favourable matchups.

At the end of a season, the two remaining fighters of each weight class are placed in a single-elimination fight at Ultimate Fighter Finales, such as The Ultimate Fighter 1 Finale where the title of Ultimate Fighter is awarded to the winner. Seasons five to seven and ten to twelve have featured fighters from just one weight class each, with the other seasons focusing on two weight classes.

The show features the daily preparations each fighter makes to train for competition at the UFC training center, and the interactions they have with each other living under the same roof. Day-to-day events on the show are overseen by UFC president Dana White.

With the exception of the season finales, fights on The Ultimate Fighter are sanctioned by the Nevada Athletic Commission as exhibition matches and do not count for or against a fighter's professional record. This is done to keep the results from going public before the air date. However, going into the semi-final stage of each series, fights are scheduled for the full professional three rounds, as opposed to two rounds (with the possibility of a sudden victory round) for all stages prior. Though officially exhibition fights, the UFC chooses to record the results of semi-final matchups. For example, the seventh season winner Amir Sadollah has one more win on his UFC record than on his official record due to his victory in his season's semi-final round.

=== Changes ===
The first six seasons featured sixteen fighters, in either one or two weight categories. The first two seasons, however, were very different from each following season. The original format for The Ultimate Fighter saw each team compete in challenges, such as hoisting their respective coach up on their shoulders and sprinting down a beach, or a team tug-of-war. These challenges resulted in eliminations of fighters who hadn't fought, until late in the season when the challenge incentive was to select the next fight where fighters would be eliminated, having lost the fight. In the first two seasons, fighters would also leave the house for good upon losing and this often resulted in odd numbers for teams, which forced the moving of fighters to opposing teams.

Beginning in season four, fighters were no longer removed from the house after losing their fights and did not switch teams except in extraordinary cases, such as being kicked off a team by the head coach. In the seventh season, instead of the usual sixteen fighters, thirty-two fighters participated. This new rule introduced a preliminary fight, in order to get into the house, which gave the coaches an early evaluation.

The final change to date was the introduction of the "wild card" for seasons 11–13. In seasons 11 & 12, 28 fighters competed in the preliminary round, with the winning fourteen entering the house. A "wild card" bout would take place at the end of the "round-of-fourteen" featuring two of the losing fighters. The winner of the wild card bout would then be included in the quarterfinal round of eight fighters. This format proved highly successful for middleweight fighter Kris McCray, who took part in season 11's wild card bout. Having lost his opening match in the house, he won the wild card bout to reach the quarter-finals and went on to win his next two bouts, reaching the tournament final. The wild card bout was instituted one last time in season 13, which only featured 14 fighters in the house & no preliminary fights.

=== Contract award ===
The winners of the first three seasons of The Ultimate Fighter competition, and certain runners-up depending on their performance in their competition finals, receive the touted "six-figure" contract to fight in the UFC. These contracts are specifically three-year contracts with a guaranteed first year. Each year consists of three fights, the first year's purse per fight consists of $12,000 guaranteed with a $12,000 win bonus (a maximum of $24,000 per fight). The second year's purse per fight is $16,000 with a $16,000 win bonus (a maximum of $32,000 per fight) and the third year's purse per fight is at $22,000 with a $22,000 win bonus (a maximum of $44,000 per fight).

A TUF winner who goes 9–0 can earn $300,000 total on the contract, but only $150,000 is guaranteed for all three years if nine fights are fought. Some TUF competitors who did not win the series were also offered UFC contracts, although not on as attractive terms.

== Coaches involvement ==
With the exception of seasons 2, 4, 11, 13, 15, 16, 22, 31, 33 and season 1 of TUF: Brazil the coaches fought each other after the conclusion of the show. Season 2 featured Rich Franklin and Matt Hughes, who were in different weight categories, eliminating the possibility for a post-season fight. Season 4 saw multiple guest coaches take the lead, differing from other seasons with two clearly designated coaches. Season 22 did not feature a fight between coaches Conor McGregor and Urijah Faber since McGregor was the UFC Interim Featherweight Champion and had an automatic title unification with Featherweight Champion José Aldo next. As such, these seasons did not feature their respective coaches in competition. Season 11 coaches Tito Ortiz and Chuck Liddell's fight was cancelled due to Ortiz's need for neck fusion surgery. Season 13 saw the fight between Brock Lesnar and Junior dos Santos cancelled after Lesnar was diagnosed with his second bout of diverticulitis. 2012 saw the cancellation of a bout between season 15 coaches Dominick Cruz and Urijah Faber, due to a torn ACL for Cruz. In addition, the expected fight between the TUF: Brazil coaches Vitor Belfort and Wanderlei Silva did not occur after Belfort sustained a broken hand while preparing for the fight. Season 16 was supposed to feature a fight between coaches Roy Nelson and Shane Carwin, though this was also cancelled after Carwin suffered a knee injury.

In addition to the seasons which did not feature post-season fights between the coaches, several seasons have been impacted, forcing postponements. Due to injuries to the season six coaches Matt Serra and Matt Hughes, their fight was postponed. Serra suffered a herniated disc in his lower back and Hughes later suffered a torn MCL before the fight finally took place at UFC 98. The fight between season ten coaches Rashad Evans and Quinton Jackson took place at UFC 114 with Rashad Evans winning by unanimous decision. The fight was postponed by five months due to Jackson's A-Team filming commitments and his temporary decision to retire from fighting.

Though rarely taking place at the live finales, the coaches' fights are an important part of each season of The Ultimate Fighter. With each season effectively hyping the fight and the individuals for multiple weeks, the fights are usually the focal point of the pay-per-view event in which they are featured. The coaches' fights have resulted in the following matchups and results:

Season	Event	Winner	Loser	Method	Notes	Source
1	UFC 52: Couture vs. Liddell 2	Chuck Liddell	Randy Couture	KO (punch) at 2:03 of round 1	Liddell won the UFC Light Heavyweight Championship.	
1	UFC 57: Liddell vs. Couture 3	Chuck Liddell	Randy Couture	KO (punch) at 1:28 of round 2	Liddell defended the UFC Light Heavyweight Championship.	
3	UFC 61: Bitter Rivals	Tito Ortiz	Ken Shamrock	TKO (punches) at 1:18 of round 1		
3	Ortiz vs. Shamrock 3: The Final Chapter	Tito Ortiz	Ken Shamrock	TKO (punches) at 2:23 of round 1		
5	The Ultimate Fighter 5 Finale	B.J. Penn	Jens Pulver	Submission (rear-naked choke) at 3:12 of round 2		
6	UFC 98: Evans vs. Machida	Matt Hughes	Matt Serra	Decision (unanimous)	Heavily delayed – see above.	
7	UFC 86: Jackson vs. Griffin	Forrest Griffin	Quinton Jackson	Decision (unanimous)	Griffin won the UFC Light Heavyweight Championship.	
8	UFC 92: The Ultimate 2008	Frank Mir	Antônio Rodrigo Nogueira	TKO (punches) at 1:54 of round 2	Mir won the Interim UFC Heavyweight Championship.	
8	UFC 140: Jones vs. Machida	Frank Mir	Antônio Rodrigo Nogueira	Technical Submission (kimura) at 3:38 of round 1		
9	UFC 100	Dan Henderson	Michael Bisping	KO (punch) at 3:20 of round 2		
9	UFC 204: Bisping vs. Henderson 2	Michael Bisping	Dan Henderson	Decision (unanimous)	Bisping defended the UFC Middleweight Championship.	
10	UFC 114: Rampage vs. Evans	Rashad Evans	Quinton Jackson	Decision (unanimous)	Heavily delayed – see above.	
11	UFC 115: Liddell vs. Franklin	Rich Franklin	Chuck Liddell	KO (punch) at 4:55 of round 1	Franklin replaced Ortiz as head coach in the final episode; fought Liddell.	
12	UFC 124: St-Pierre vs. Koscheck 2	Georges St-Pierre	Josh Koscheck	Decision (unanimous)	St-Pierre defended the UFC Welterweight Championship.	
14	The Ultimate Fighter: Team Bisping vs. Team Miller Finale	Michael Bisping	Jason Miller	TKO (knees to the body and punches) at 3:34 of round 3		
15	UFC 199: Rockhold vs. Bisping 2	Dominick Cruz	Urijah Faber	Decision (unanimous)	Cruz defended the UFC Bantamweight Championship.	
Smashes	UFC on FX: Sotiropoulos vs. Pearson	Ross Pearson	George Sotiropoulos	TKO (punches) at 0:41 of round 3		
17	UFC 159: Jones vs. Sonnen	Jon Jones	Chael Sonnen	TKO (punches and elbows) at 4:33 of round 1	Jones defended the UFC Light Heavyweight Championship.	
Brazil 2	UFC on Fuel TV: Nogueira vs. Werdum	Fabrício Werdum	Antônio Rodrigo Nogueira	Submission (armbar) at 2:41 of round 2		
18	UFC 168: Weidman vs. Silva 2	Ronda Rousey	Miesha Tate	Submission (armbar) at 0:58 of round 3	Rousey defended the UFC Women's Bantamweight Championship.	
Nations	The Ultimate Fighter Nations Finale: Bisping vs. Kennedy	Patrick Côté	Kyle Noke	Decision (unanimous)		
19	The Ultimate Fighter: Team Edgar vs. Team Penn Finale	Frankie Edgar	B.J. Penn	TKO (strikes) at 4:16 of round 3		
20	UFC 181: Hendricks vs. Lawler 2	Anthony Pettis	Gilbert Melendez	Submission (guillotine choke) at 1:53 of round 2	Pettis defended the UFC Lightweight Championship.	
Latin America	UFC 188: Velasquez vs. Werdum	Fabrício Werdum	Cain Velasquez	Submission (guillotine choke) at 2:13 of round 3	Werdum won and unified the UFC Heavyweight Championship.	
23	The Ultimate Fighter: Team Joanna vs. Team Cláudia Finale	Joanna Jędrzejczyk	Cláudia Gadelha	Decision (unanimous)	Jędrzejczyk defended the UFC Women's Strawweight Championship.	
24	The Ultimate Fighter: Tournament of Champions Finale	Joseph Benavidez	Henry Cejudo	Decision (split)		
25	UFC 217: Bisping vs. St-Pierre	T.J. Dillashaw	Cody Garbrandt	KO (punches) at 2:41 of round 2	Dillashaw won the UFC Bantamweight Championship.	
25	UFC 227: Dillashaw vs. Garbrandt 2	T.J. Dillashaw	Cody Garbrandt	TKO (knee and punches) at 4:10 of round 1	Dillashaw defended the UFC Bantamweight Championship.	
26	UFC 218: Holloway vs. Aldo 2	Eddie Alvarez	Justin Gaethje	TKO (knee and punches) at 3:59 of round 3		
27	UFC 226: Miocic vs. Cormier	Daniel Cormier	Stipe Miocic	KO (punches) at 4:33 of round 1	Cormier won the UFC Heavyweight Championship.	
27	UFC 241: Cormier vs. Miocic 2	Stipe Miocic	Daniel Cormier	TKO (punches) at 4:09 of round 4	Miocic won the UFC Heavyweight Championship.	
27	UFC 252: Miocic vs. Cormier 3	Stipe Miocic	Daniel Cormier	Decision (unanimous)	Miocic defended the UFC Heavyweight Championship.	
28	UFC on ESPN: Whittaker vs. Gastelum	Robert Whittaker	Kelvin Gastelum	Decision (unanimous)	Heavily delayed	
29	UFC 266: Volkanovski vs. Ortega	Alexander Volkanovski	Brian Ortega	Decision (unanimous)	Volkanovski defended the UFC Featherweight Championship.	
30	UFC 277: Peña vs. Nunes 2	Amanda Nunes	Julianna Peña	Decision (unanimous)	Nunes won the UFC Women's Bantamweight Championship.	
32	UFC 306 O'Malley vs. Dvalishvili	Valentina Shevchenko	Alexa Grasso	Decision (unanimous)	Shevchenko won the UFC Women's Flyweight Championship.	

== Season synopses ==
Season 1–3

The first season of The Ultimate Fighter was the last attempt by the UFC to capture public interest in the sport. The Stephan Bonnar and Forrest Griffin bout saved the sport according to many journalists and Dana White. Despite his loss, Bonnar was also awarded a coveted contract live on the air, after White declared that "There were no losers in this fight." Griffin and Diego Sanchez are also regarded as the original Ultimate Fighters, after their wins at the finale.

The second season saw welterweights and heavyweights compete, featuring coaches Rich Franklin and Matt Hughes. The final saw Rashad Evans defeating Brad Imes and Joe Stevenson defeating Luke Cummo.

The third season highlighted the long-standing rivalry between Tito Ortiz and Ken Shamrock. It was also the first season to feature competitors from outside of North America, after the addition of Michael Bisping and Ross Pointon. The season saw a format change, when the team-games were eliminated in favour of a conventional knockout style tournament format. The final fights saw Michael Bisping become the first non-American winner, defeating Josh Haynes and Kendall Grove defeat Ed Herman.

Season 4–7

The fourth season was different from others before it, as it was the "comeback" season. Past UFC fighters who hadn't had the success they were expected to have, were invited back, to compete in the show, with the winner receiving a guaranteed title shot. This season was also the only one to date to not feature team coaches. Instead, the show had guest coaches each week. The final saw Matt Serra defeat Chris Lytle and Travis Lutter defeat Patrick Côté to receive their guaranteed title shots.

The fifth season was coached by Jens Pulver and B.J. Penn, as the company attempted to kickstart the lightweight division. The show featured many of the future stars of the lightweight division such as Nate Diaz, Joe Lauzon, Gray Maynard, Matt Wiman and Cole Miller. Despite the fact that Team Pulver won 5 out of the first eight fights, the 3 fighters who made it through the quarterfinals on Team Penn are still in the UFC which are Gray Maynard, Matt Wiman and Joe Lauzon while Cole Miller, Manvel Gamburyan, and Nate Diaz from Team Pulver are still in the UFC. The final was contested by Nate Diaz and Manvel Gamburyan, with Gamburyan falling to a shoulder injury early on.

Former winner Matt Serra returned to the show in the sixth season to coach alongside Matt Hughes and oversaw a group of welterweight fighters. The final saw veteran Mac Danzig defeat Tommy Speer to become The Ultimate Fighter, before he dropped to the lightweight division. Arguably, only George Sotiropoulos has gone on to have any success post-TUF, having gone on a 7 fight win streak after The Ultimate Fighter, while season winner Danzig has hovered around the .500 mark since his season win.

The seventh season saw another format change, as fighters had to compete to be official castmembers. Instead of the usual 16 fighters, the season had 32 fighters after Dana White claimed that he was tired of fighters coming onto the show for airtime. This season was coached by UFC Light Heavyweight champion Quinton Jackson and challenger Forrest Griffin, the first season's winner. The season's final was due to be competed between Amir Sadollah, who hadn't competed in a professional fight before the show, and Jesse Taylor. However, Taylor was kicked off the show after filming had completed, when he kicked the window out of a limousine in Las Vegas. His slot was taken by C.B. Dollaway who defeated Tim Credeur for the right, but Sadollah won in the final to become The Ultimate Fighter.

Season 8–12

The eighth season was coached by UFC Interim Heavyweight champion Antônio Rodrigo Nogueira and Frank Mir, with lightweights and light heavyweights being the focus for the season. The show was largely dominated by the actions of Junie Browning, who would regularly get drunk and act in an aggressive manner towards his fellow castmates. The two fights at the final saw Efraín Escudero defeat Phillipe Nover and Ryan Bader defeat Vinny Magalhães.

The ninth season saw a United States vs. United Kingdom theme for the show, with Dan Henderson and Michael Bisping coaching the respective sides. The two sides contrasted, with the UK side showing close friendship (with many coming from Team Rough House), whilst the US team appeared fractured. The lightweight final saw Team Rough House teammates Andre Winner and Ross Pearson face off for the contract, with Pearson coming out on top via decision. The welterweight final saw James Wilks defeat DaMarques Johnson via submission in the opening round, handing the UK team a 2–0 victory.

The tenth season was the first season to feature only heavyweights and was largely built around the internet sensation Kimbo Slice and former NFL players. The two coaches were former UFC Light Heavyweight champions Quinton Jackson and Rashad Evans who squabbled throughout the entire season, hyping their eventual fight further. However, midway through the airing of the season, it was announced that Jackson was filming The A-Team, as its lead character B. A. Baracus, leading to the postponement of the coaches' fight. The season also featured several former NFL players, with one - Brendan Schaub - making the final of the show. Additionally, the season was occasionally criticised after the cardio of the heavyweights came into question. The final saw MMA veteran Roy Nelson and Brendan Schaub, with Nelson winning via first-round knockout.

The eleventh season saw former UFC Light Heavyweight champions Tito Ortiz and Chuck Liddell coach the two teams. Unlike previous seasons, the number of competitors in the house was reduced to 14, with 7 progressing to the quarter-finals. An eighth was added via a "wildcard" bout - a bout between two losers from the round of 14. The slots went to Kyacey Uscola and Kris McCray, which saw McCray win via submission. McCray would then go on to avenge his earlier defeat, in the semi-finals, defeating Josh Bryant. The season was blighted by injuries to multiple competitors, such as the withdrawal of Nick Ring, after he required knee surgery. After Rich Attonito pulled out of the competition, his quarter final place was taken by Court McGee. Court McGee and Kris McCray met in the final, where McGee would win via submission to become The Ultimate Fighter.

The twelfth season saw the UFC Welterweight champion Georges St-Pierre coach alongside former opponent and number one contender to the title, Josh Koscheck. The season saw the continuation of the wildcard format and 14-man tournament bracket. The show's number one pick was Marc Stevens, who would go on to lose in one of the quickest submissions (via guillotine choke) in the show's history. The wildcard slots went to Marc Stevens and Aaron Wilkinson, with Wilkinson handing Stevens his second successive guillotine choke loss. The show was dominated by Josh Koscheck's attempts to annoy Georges St-Pierre, with St-Pierre's paramedic getting involved in the arguments with Koscheck. The finale was a match between Jonathan Brookins and Michael Johnson on December 4, 2010, which resulted in Brookins winning via unanimous decision.

Season 13–16 (and regional versions)

The thirteenth season was coached by former UFC Heavyweight champion Brock Lesnar and Junior dos Santos, who would later go on to win the same title. This season featured welterweights and removed the elimination bouts to get into the house, with 14 fighters immediately gaining entry into the house. The first day of training saw Myles Jury pull out of the competition with a knee injury. The wildcard made another appearance, with Javier Torres and Chuck O'Neil getting the slots, leading to a submission victory for O'Neil. The final of this season saw Tony Ferguson defeat Ramsey Nijem via KO in the first round.

The fourteenth season featured bantamweights and featherweights for the first time, with Michael Bisping coaching for the second time, with Jason Miller opposing him. The cast was considered to be one of the most notable in several seasons of the Ultimate Fighter, perhaps owing to this season being the first for the weight classes. Fighters once again had to compete to get into the house, but during the preliminary round, Dana White announced end-of-season bonuses for the best knockout, submission and fight. The awards went to John Dodson, Dennis Bermudez and Dustin Pague vs. Louis Gaudinot respectively. The eventual winners of the season were John Dodson (who defeated T.J. Dillashaw at bantamweight) and Diego Brandao (who defeated Dennis Bermudez at featherweight).

The fifteenth season was the first season to air on FX and moved to a live format. The season was coached by UFC Bantamweight champion Dominick Cruz and Urijah Faber and featured the lightweight division. The entry fights consisted of just one round, as opposed to the usual two with the possibility of a sudden death victory. During the first week in the house, Michael Chiesa - one of the participants - was told that his father had died. Despite this, he was able to continue in the competition and ultimately won after defeating Al Iaquinta at the finale. The live season aired at the same time as TUF Brazil, which was the first regional version of the show. That season was coached by Vitor Belfort and Wanderlei Silva and featured featherweights and middleweights. This season featured a scrambling of the teams, as seven of the Team Vitor fighters had won for only one of the Team Wanderlei fighters. The finalists for the show were Rony "Jason" Mariano Bezerra and Godofredo Pepey in the featherweight division and Cezar "Mutante" Ferreira and Daniel Sarafian in the middleweight division. However, Sarafian was forced to withdraw from the finale, making him the first and (to-date) only finalist to ever withdraw through injury. He was replaced by Sergio "Serginho" Moraes, the man he had defeated via KO in the semi-final round. The eventual winners were Bezerra and Ferreira, with both winning via decision.

== Seasons ==
=== Main seasons ===
Season and airdates	Coaches and colours	Weight division	Winner(s)	Runner(s) up
The Ultimate Fighter 1 January 17, 2005 – April 4, 2005	Chuck Liddell; Randy Couture	Middleweight; Light Heavyweight	Diego Sanchez; Forrest Griffin	Kenny Florian; Stephan Bonnar
The Ultimate Fighter 2 August 22, 2005 – November 1, 2005	Matt Hughes; Rich Franklin	Welterweight; Heavyweight	Joe Stevenson; Rashad Evans	Luke Cummo; Brad Imes
The Ultimate Fighter 3 April 6, 2006 – June 15, 2006	Tito Ortiz; Ken Shamrock	Middleweight; Light Heavyweight	Kendall Grove; Michael Bisping	Ed Herman; Josh Haynes
The Ultimate Fighter 4: The Comeback^{[A]} August 17, 2006 – November 2, 2006	Team Mojo; Team No Love	Welterweight; Middleweight	Matt Serra; Travis Lutter	Chris Lytle; Patrick Côté
The Ultimate Fighter 5 April 5, 2007 – June 23, 2007	Jens Pulver; B.J. Penn	Lightweight	Nate Diaz	Manny Gamburyan
The Ultimate Fighter: Team Hughes vs. Team Serra; September 19, 2007 – December 8, 2007	Matt Hughes; Matt Serra	Welterweight	Mac Danzig	Tom Speer
The Ultimate Fighter: Team Rampage vs. Team Forrest; April 2, 2008 – June 21, 2008	Quinton Jackson; Forrest Griffin	Middleweight	Amir Sadollah	C.B. Dollaway
The Ultimate Fighter: Team Nogueira vs. Team Mir; September 17, 2008 – December 13, 2008	Antônio Rodrigo Nogueira; Frank Mir	Lightweight; Light Heavyweight	Efraín Escudero; Ryan Bader	Phillipe Nover; Vinny Magalhães
The Ultimate Fighter: United States vs. United Kingdom; April 1, 2009 – June 20, 2009	(United States) Dan Henderson (United Kingdom) Michael Bisping	Lightweight; Welterweight	(United Kingdom) Ross Pearson (United Kingdom) James Wilks	(United Kingdom) Andre Winner (United States) DaMarques Johnson
The Ultimate Fighter: Heavyweights; September 16, 2009 – December 5, 2009	Quinton Jackson; Rashad Evans	Heavyweight	Roy Nelson	Brendan Schaub
The Ultimate Fighter: Team Liddell vs. Team Ortiz; March 31, 2010 – June 19, 2010	Chuck Liddell; Tito Ortiz^{[B]}	Middleweight	Court McGee	Kris McCray
The Ultimate Fighter: Team GSP vs. Team Koscheck; September 15, 2010 – December 4, 2010	Georges St-Pierre; Josh Koscheck	Lightweight	Jonathan Brookins	Michael Johnson
The Ultimate Fighter: Team Lesnar vs. Team dos Santos; March 30, 2011 – June 4, 2011	Brock Lesnar; Junior dos Santos	Welterweight	Tony Ferguson	Ramsey Nijem
The Ultimate Fighter: Team Bisping vs. Team Miller; September 21, 2011 – December 3, 2011	Michael Bisping; Jason Miller	Bantamweight; Featherweight	John Dodson; Diego Brandão	T.J. Dillashaw; Dennis Bermudez
The Ultimate Fighter: Live; March 9, 2012 – May 25, 2012	Dominick Cruz; Urijah Faber	Lightweight	Michael Chiesa	Al Iaquinta
The Ultimate Fighter: Team Carwin vs. Team Nelson; September 14, 2012 – December 15, 2012	Shane Carwin; Roy Nelson	Welterweight	Colton Smith	Mike Ricci
The Ultimate Fighter: Team Jones vs. Team Sonnen; January 22, 2013 – April 9, 2013	Jon Jones; Chael Sonnen	Middleweight	Kelvin Gastelum	Uriah Hall
The Ultimate Fighter: Team Rousey vs. Team Tate; September 4, 2013 – November 27, 2013	Ronda Rousey; Miesha Tate	Bantamweight; Women's Bantamweight	Chris Holdsworth; Julianna Peña	Davey Grant; Jessica Rakoczy
The Ultimate Fighter: Team Edgar vs. Team Penn; April 16, 2014 – July 2, 2014	Frankie Edgar; B.J. Penn	Middleweight; Light Heavyweight	Eddie Gordon; Corey Anderson	Dhiego Lima; Matt Van Buren
The Ultimate Fighter: A Champion Will Be Crowned; September 10, 2014 – December 10, 2014	Anthony Pettis; Gilbert Melendez	Women's Strawweight	Carla Esparza	Rose Namajunas
The Ultimate Fighter: American Top Team vs. Blackzilians^{[C]} April 22, 2015 – July 8, 2015	American Top Team; Blackzilians	Welterweight	Kamaru Usman; American Top Team^{[D]}	Hayder Hassan; Blackzilians
The Ultimate Fighter: Team McGregor vs. Team Faber; September 9, 2015 – December 9, 2015	Conor McGregor; Urijah Faber	Lightweight	Ryan Hall^{[E]}	Artem Lobov
The Ultimate Fighter: Team Joanna vs. Team Cláudia; April 20, 2016 – July 6, 2016	Joanna Jędrzejczyk; Cláudia Gadelha	Light Heavyweight; Women's Strawweight	Andrew Sanchez; Tatiana Suarez	Khalil Rountree; Amanda Cooper
The Ultimate Fighter: Tournament of Champions; August 31, 2016 – November 30, 2016	Joseph Benavidez; Henry Cejudo	Flyweight	Tim Elliott	Hiromasa Ougikubo
The Ultimate Fighter: Redemption; April 19, 2017 – July 5, 2017	Cody Garbrandt; T.J. Dillashaw	Welterweight	Jesse Taylor	Dhiego Lima
The Ultimate Fighter: A New World Champion; August 30, 2017 – November 29, 2017	Eddie Alvarez; Justin Gaethje	Women's Flyweight	Nicco Montaño	Roxanne Modafferi^{[F]}
The Ultimate Fighter: Undefeated; April 18, 2018 – July 4, 2018	Stipe Miocic; Daniel Cormier	Featherweight; Lightweight	Brad Katona; Michael Trizano	Jay Cucciniello; Joe Giannetti
The Ultimate Fighter: Heavy Hitters; August 29, 2018 – November 30, 2018	Robert Whittaker; Kelvin Gastelum	Heavyweight; Women's Featherweight	Juan Espino; Macy Chiasson	Justin Frazier; Pannie Kianzad
The Return of The Ultimate Fighter: Team Volkanovski vs. Team Ortega; June 1, 2021 – August 17, 2021	Alexander Volkanovski; Brian Ortega	Bantamweight; Middleweight	Ricky Turcios; Bryan Battle	Brady Hiestand; Gilbert Urbina
The Ultimate Fighter: Team Peña vs. Team Nunes; May 3, 2022 – July 19, 2022	Julianna Peña; Amanda Nunes	Heavyweight; Women's Flyweight	Mohammed Usman; Juliana Miller	Zac Pauga; Brogan Walker-Sanchez
The Ultimate Fighter: Team McGregor vs. Team Chandler; May 30, 2023 – August 15, 2023	Conor McGregor; Michael Chandler	Bantamweight; Lightweight	Brad Katona^{[G]} Kurt Holobaugh	Cody Gibson; Austin Hubbard
The Ultimate Fighter: Team Grasso vs. Team Shevchenko; June 4, 2024 – August 20, 2024	Alexa Grasso; Valentina Shevchenko	Featherweight; Middleweight	Mairon Santos; Ryan Loder	Kaan Ofli; Robert Valentin
The Ultimate Fighter: Team Cormier vs. Team Sonnen; May 27, 2025 – August 12, 2025	Daniel Cormier; Chael Sonnen	Flyweight; Welterweight	Joseph Morales; Daniil Donchenko	Alibi Idiris; Rodrigo Sezinando
The Ultimate Fighter: Team Cormier vs. Team Bisping; June 14, 2026 – August 25, 2026	Daniel Cormier; Michael Bisping	Bantamweight; Women's Strawweight	Ilimbek Akylbek Uulu; Valesca Machado	Mehemmedeli Osmanli; Melissa Amaya

A. For this season instead of coaches, prominent trainers and UFC fighters acted as advisors.
B. Tito Ortiz was replaced in the final episode by Rich Franklin.
C. This season is the first to feature a gym vs. gym format as each team is composed of fighters from the same gym and their head coaches are also the teams' head coaches.
D. There was no individual tournament for the season. After a round of 12 fights, divided into points (the first four fights were 25 points, the next 50 and the last were 100 points), American Top Team emerged victorious and won $200,000. Then, each team picked a representative to fight at the finale for $300,000 and the tournament trophy.
E. Saul Rogers was scheduled to be part of the finale, but was pulled due to Visa issues and was replaced by Ryan Hall.
F. Sijara Eubanks was scheduled to be part of the finale, but was pulled on the day of the weigh ins for medical reasons and was replaced by Roxanne Modafferi.
G. Brad Katona was originally on Team Chandler, but switched to Team McGregor in the semi-final round.

=== International versions ===
These versions did not have a stand-alone The Ultimate Fighter final.

Season and airdates	Coaches and colours	Weight division	Winner(s)	Runner(s) up
The Ultimate Fighter: Brazil; March 25, 2012 – June 23, 2012	Vitor Belfort; Wanderlei Silva	Featherweights; Middleweights	Rony Jason; Cezar Ferreira	Godofredo Pepey; Sergio Moraes^{[H]}
The Ultimate Fighter: The Smashes; September 19, 2012 – December 14, 2012	(United Kingdom) Ross Pearson (Australia) George Sotiropoulos	Lightweights; Welterweights	(United Kingdom) Norman Parke (Australia) Robert Whittaker	(United Kingdom) Colin Fletcher (United Kingdom) Brad Scott
The Ultimate Fighter: Brazil 2 March 17, 2013 – June 2, 2013	Antônio Rodrigo Nogueira; Fabrício Werdum	Welterweights	Leonardo Santos^{[I]}	William Macario
The Ultimate Fighter: China^{[J]} December 7, 2013 – January 26, 2014	Tiequan Zhang; Hailin Ao^{[K]}	Featherweights; Welterweights	Ning Guangyou; Zhang Lipeng	Yang Jianping; Wang Sai
The Ultimate Fighter Nations: Canada vs. Australia; January 15, 2014 – April 9, 2014	(Canada) Patrick Côté (Australia) Kyle Noke	Welterweights; Middleweights	(Canada) Chad Laprise (Canada) Elias Theodorou	(Canada) Olivier Aubin-Mercier (Canada) Sheldon Westcott
The Ultimate Fighter: Brazil 3 March 9, 2014 – May 25, 2014	Wanderlei Silva; Chael Sonnen	Middleweights; Heavyweights	Warlley Alves; Antônio Carlos Júnior	Márcio Alexandre Júnior; Vitor Miranda
The Ultimate Fighter: Latin America; August 20, 2014 – November 5, 2014	Cain Velasquez; Fabrício Werdum	Bantamweights; Featherweights	Alejandro Pérez; Yair Rodríguez	José Alberto Quiñónez; Leonardo Morales
The Ultimate Fighter: Brazil 4 April 5, 2015 – June 21, 2015	Anderson Silva^{[L]} Maurício Rua	Bantamweights; Lightweights	Reginaldo Vieira; Glaico França	Dileno Lopes; Fernando Bruno
The Ultimate Fighter: Latin America 2 August 26, 2015 – November 11, 2015	Kelvin Gastelum; Efraín Escudero	Lightweights; Welterweights	Enrique Barzola; Erick Montaño	Horacio Gutiérrez; Enrique Marín
The Ultimate Fighter: Latin America 3 August 20, 2016 – November 5, 2016	Chuck Liddell; Forrest Griffin	Lightweights	Martín Bravo	Claudio Puelles

H. Daniel Sarafian was scheduled to be part of the finale, but was injured and replaced by Sergio Moraes.
I. Santiago Ponzinibbio was scheduled to be part of the finale, but was injured and replaced by Leonardo Santos.
J. For this season Cung Le served as a mentor and chief coach.
K. Hailin Ao left the show after the 4th episode for personal reasons. His staff took over his duties.
L. Anderson Silva was removed from the show on episode 3 due to his failed pre-fight drug test for UFC 183. He was replaced by Antônio Rodrigo Nogueira.

== Impact ==
=== Post-show success ===
The Ultimate Fighter has created many successful fighters. As of October 2019, ten TUF contestants have won UFC titles. However, some fighters have also had success in the sister promotions World Extreme Cagefighting (WEC) or Strikeforce. The following fighters have competed for a UFC, Strikeforce or WEC championship:

Season 1

Result	TUF Competitor	Opponent	Method	Event	Date	Notes
Loss	Nate Quarry	Rich Franklin	KO (punch) at 2:32 of round 1	UFC 56	November 19, 2005	For Franklin's UFC Middleweight Championship.
Win	Lodune Sincaid	Dan Molina	Submission (rear naked choke) at 3:17 of round 1	WEC 20	May 5, 2006	For the vacant WEC Light Heavyweight Championship.
Loss	Lodune Sincaid	Doug Marshall	TKO (punches) at 0:51 of round 2	WEC 23	August 17, 2006	Lost his WEC Light Heavyweight Championship.
Loss	Kenny Florian	Sean Sherk	Decision (unanimous)	UFC 64	October 14, 2006	For the vacant UFC Lightweight Championship.
Win	Bobby Southworth	Vernon White	Decision (unanimous)	Strikeforce: Triple Threat	December 8, 2006	For the inaugural Strikeforce Light Heavyweight Championship.
Win	Bobby Southworth	Anthony Ruiz	Decision (unanimous)	Strikeforce: Melendez vs. Thomson	June 27, 2008	Defended his Strikeforce Light Heavyweight Championship.
Win	Forrest Griffin	Quinton Jackson	Decision (unanimous)	UFC 86	July 5, 2008	For Jackson's UFC Light Heavyweight Championship.
Loss	Bobby Southworth	Renato Sobral	TKO (cut) at 5:00 of round 1	Strikeforce: Destruction	November 21, 2008	Lost his Strikeforce Light Heavyweight Championship.
Loss	Forrest Griffin	Rashad Evans	TKO (punches) at 2:46 of round 3	UFC 92	December 27, 2008	Lost his UFC Light Heavyweight Championship.
Loss	Kenny Florian	B.J. Penn	Submission (rear naked choke) at 3:54 of round 4	UFC 101	August 8, 2009	For Penn's UFC Lightweight Championship.
Loss	Diego Sanchez	B.J. Penn	TKO (cut) at 2:37 of round 5	UFC 107	December 12, 2009	For Penn's UFC Lightweight Championship.
Loss	Josh Koscheck	Georges St-Pierre	Decision (unanimous)	UFC 124	December 11, 2010	For St-Pierre's UFC Welterweight Championship.
Loss	Kenny Florian	José Aldo	Decision (unanimous)	UFC 136	October 8, 2011	For Aldo's UFC Featherweight Championship.

Season 2

Result	TUF Competitor	Opponent	Method	Event	Date	Notes
Loss	Joe Stevenson	B.J. Penn	Submission (rear naked choke) at 4:02 of round 2	UFC 80	January 19, 2008	For the vacant UFC Lightweight Championship.
Win	Rashad Evans	Forrest Griffin	TKO (punches) at 2:46 of round 3	UFC 92	December 27, 2008	For Griffin's UFC Light Heavyweight Championship.
Loss	Rashad Evans	Lyoto Machida	KO (punches) at 3:57 of round 2	UFC 98	May 23, 2009	Lost his UFC Light Heavyweight Championship.
Loss	Keith Jardine	Luke Rockhold	TKO (punches) at 4:26 of round 1	Strikeforce: Rockhold vs. Jardine	January 7, 2012	For Rockhold's Strikeforce Middleweight Championship.
Loss	Rashad Evans	Jon Jones	Decision (unanimous)	UFC 145	April 21, 2012	For Jones' UFC Light Heavyweight Championship.

Season 3

Result	TUF Competitor	Opponent	Method	Event	Date	Notes
Win	Michael Bisping	Luke Rockhold	KO (punches) at 3:36 of round 1	UFC 199	June 4, 2016	For Rockhold's UFC Middleweight Championship.
Win	Michael Bisping	Dan Henderson	Decision (unanimous)	UFC 204	October 8, 2016	Defended his UFC Middleweight Championship.
Loss	Michael Bisping	Georges St-Pierre	Technical Submission (rear naked choke) at 4:23 of round 3	UFC 217	November 4, 2017	Lost his UFC Middleweight Championship.

Season 4

As part of season four, Travis Lutter and Matt Serra received automatic and immediate title shots, though non-winners can also compete for titles. Lutter was scheduled to compete for the UFC Middleweight Championship at UFC 67: All Or Nothing, but weighed in over the limit. He still competed against the champion and lost a non–title fight.

Result	TUF Competitor	Opponent	Method	Event	Date	Notes
Win	Matt Serra	Georges St-Pierre	TKO (punches) at 3:25 of round 1	UFC 69	April 7, 2007	For St-Pierre's UFC Welterweight Championship.
Loss	Matt Serra	Georges St-Pierre	TKO (knees to the body) at 4:45 of round 2	UFC 83	April 19, 2008	Lost his UFC Welterweight Championship.
Loss	Patrick Côté	Anderson Silva	TKO (knee injury) at 0:39 of round 3	UFC 90	October 25, 2008	For Silva's UFC Middleweight Championship.

Season 5

Result	TUF Competitor	Opponent	Method	Event	Date	Notes
Loss	Manny Gamburyan	José Aldo	KO (punches) at 1:32 of round 2	WEC 51	September 30, 2010	For Aldo's WEC Featherweight Championship.
Draw	Gray Maynard	Frankie Edgar	Draw (split)	UFC 125	January 1, 2011	For Edgar's UFC Lightweight Championship.
Loss	Gray Maynard	Frankie Edgar	KO (punches) at 3:54 of round 4	UFC 136	October 8, 2011	For Edgar's UFC Lightweight Championship.
Loss	Nate Diaz	Benson Henderson	Decision (unanimous)	UFC on Fox: Henderson vs. Diaz	December 8, 2012	For Henderson's UFC Lightweight Championship.

Season 13

Result	TUF Competitor	Opponent	Method	Event	Date	Notes
Win	Tony Ferguson	Kevin Lee	Submission (triangle choke) at 4:02 of round 3	UFC 216	October 7, 2017	For the interim UFC Lightweight Championship.
Loss	Tony Ferguson	Justin Gaethje	TKO (Punch) at 3:39 of Round 5	UFC 249	May 9, 2020	For the interim UFC Lightweight Championship.

Season 14

Result	TUF Competitor	Opponent	Method	Event	Date	Notes
Loss	John Dodson	Demetrious Johnson	Decision (unanimous)	UFC on Fox: Johnson vs. Dodson	January 26, 2013	For Johnson's UFC Flyweight Championship.
Win	T.J. Dillashaw	Renan Barão	TKO (head kick and punches) at 2:26 of round 5	UFC 173	May 24, 2014	For Barão's UFC Bantamweight Championship.
Win	T.J. Dillashaw	Joe Soto	KO (head kick and punches) at 2:20 of round 5	UFC 177	August 30, 2014	Defended his UFC Bantamweight Championship.
Win	T.J. Dillashaw	Renan Barão	TKO (punches) at 0:35 of round 4	UFC on Fox: Dillashaw vs. Barão 2	July 25, 2015	Defended his UFC Bantamweight Championship.
Loss	John Dodson	Demetrious Johnson	Decision (unanimous)	UFC 191	September 5, 2015	For Johnson's UFC Flyweight Championship.
Loss	T.J. Dillashaw	Dominick Cruz	Decision (split)	UFC Fight Night: Dillashaw vs. Cruz	January 17, 2016	Lost his UFC Bantamweight Championship.
Win	T.J. Dillashaw	Cody Garbrandt	KO (punches) at 2:41 of round 2	UFC 217	November 4, 2017	For Garbrandt's UFC Bantamweight Championship.
Win	T.J. Dillashaw	Cody Garbrandt	KO (knee and punches) at 4:10 of round 1	UFC 227	August 4, 2018	Defended his UFC Bantamweight Championship.
Loss	T.J. Dillashaw	Henry Cejudo	TKO (punches)	UFC Fight Night: Cejudo vs. Dillashaw	January 19, 2019	For Cejudo's UFC Flyweight Championship.
Loss	T.J. Dillashaw	Aljamain Sterling	TKO (punches) at 3:44 of round 2	UFC 280	October 22, 2022	For Sterling's UFC Bantamweight Championship

Season 15

Result	TUF Competitor	Opponent	Method	Event	Date	Notes
Loss	Al Iaquinta	Khabib Nurmagomedov	Decision (unanimous)	UFC 223	April 7, 2018	For the vacant UFC Lightweight Championship. Iaquinta initially made weight (155.2 lbs) for his bout against Paul Felder, but was ineligible to win the title.

Season 17

Result	TUF Competitor	Opponent	Method	Event	Date	Notes
Loss	Kelvin Gastelum	Israel Adesanya	Decision (unanimous)	UFC 236	April 13, 2019	For the interim UFC Middleweight Championship.

Season 18

Result	TUF Competitor	Opponent	Method	Event	Date	Notes
Loss	Valérie Létourneau	Joanna Jędrzejczyk	Decision (unanimous)	UFC 193	November 15, 2015	For Jędrzejczyk's UFC Women's Strawweight Championship.
Loss	Tonya Evinger	Cris Cyborg	TKO (knees) at 1:56 of round 3	UFC 214	July 29, 2017	For the vacant UFC Women's Featherweight Championship.
Loss	Roxanne Modafferi	Nicco Montaño	Decision (unanimous)	The Ultimate Fighter: A New World Champion Finale	December 1, 2017	For the inaugural UFC Women's Flyweight Championship.
Loss	Raquel Pennington	Amanda Nunes	TKO (punches) at 2:36 of round 5	UFC 224	May 12, 2018	For Nunes' UFC Women's Bantamweight Championship.
Win	Julianna Peña	Amanda Nunes	Submission (rear-naked choke) at 3:26 of round 2	UFC 269	December 11, 2021	For Nunes' UFC Women's Bantamweight Championship.
Loss	Julianna Peña	Amanda Nunes	Decision (unanimous)	UFC 277	July 30, 2022	Lost her UFC Women's Bantamweight Championship.
Win	Raquel Pennington	Mayra Bueno Silva	Decision (unanimous)	UFC 297	January 20, 2024	For the vacant UFC Women's Bantamweight Championship.
Win	Julianna Peña	Raquel Pennington	Decision (split)	UFC 307	October 5, 2024	For Pennington's UFC Women's Bantamweight Championship; Pennington was also a TUF competitor.
Loss	Julianna Peña	Kayla Harrison	Submission (kimura) at 4:55 of round 2	UFC 316	June 7, 2025	Lost her UFC Women's Bantamweight Championship.

Season 20

Season 20 was the first season of The Ultimate Fighter to crown a champion. All fighters of the season were competing to win the inaugural UFC Women's Strawweight Championship. Most of the competitors from the division came from TUF 20.

Result	TUF Competitor	Opponent	Method	Event	Date	Notes
Win	Carla Esparza	Rose Namajunas	Submission (rear-naked choke) at 1:26 of round 3	The Ultimate Fighter: A Champion Will Be Crowned Finale	December 12, 2014	For the inaugural UFC Women's Strawweight Championship; Namajunas was also a TUF competitor.
Loss	Carla Esparza	Joanna Jędrzejczyk	TKO (punches) at 4:17 of round 2	UFC 185	March 14, 2015	Lost her UFC Women's Strawweight Championship.
Loss	Jessica Penne	Joanna Jędrzejczyk	TKO (punches and knee) at 4:22 of round 3	UFC Fight Night: Jędrzejczyk vs. Penne	June 20, 2015	For Jędrzejczyk's UFC Women's Strawweight Championship.
Win	Rose Namajunas	Joanna Jędrzejczyk	TKO (punches) at 3:03 of round 1	UFC 217	November 4, 2017	For Jędrzejczyk's UFC Women's Strawweight Championship.
Win	Rose Namajunas	Joanna Jędrzejczyk	Decision (unanimous)	UFC 223	April 7, 2018	Defended her UFC Women's Strawweight Championship.
Loss	Rose Namajunas	Jéssica Andrade	KO (slam) at 2:58 of round 2	UFC 237	May 11, 2019	Lost her UFC Women's Strawweight Championship.
Win	Rose Namajunas	Zhang Weili	KO (head kick) at 1:18 of round 1	UFC 261	April 24, 2021	For Weili's UFC Women's Strawweight Championship.
Win	Rose Namajunas	Zhang Weili	Decision (split)	UFC 268	November 6, 2021	Defended her UFC Women's Strawweight Championship.
Win	Carla Esparza	Rose Namajunas	Decision (split)	UFC 274	May 7, 2022	For Namajunas' UFC Women's Strawweight Championship; Namajunas was also a TUF competitor.
Loss	Carla Esparza	Zhang Weili	Submission (rear-naked choke) at 1:05 of round 2	UFC 281	November 12, 2022	Lost her UFC Women's Strawweight Championship.

Season 21

Result	TUF Competitor	Opponent	Method	Event	Date	Notes
Win	Kamaru Usman	Tyron Woodley	Decision (unanimous)	UFC 235	March 2, 2019	For Woodley's UFC Welterweight Championship.
Win	Kamaru Usman	Colby Covington	TKO (punches) at 4:10 of round 5	UFC 245	December 14, 2019	Defended his UFC Welterweight Championship.
Win	Kamaru Usman	Jorge Masvidal	Decision (unanimous)	UFC 251	July 12, 2020	Defended his UFC Welterweight Championship.
Win	Kamaru Usman	Gilbert Burns	TKO (punches) at 0:34 of round 3	UFC 258	February 13, 2021	Defended his UFC Welterweight Championship.
Win	Kamaru Usman	Jorge Masvidal	KO (punches) at 1:02 of round 2	UFC 261	April 24, 2021	Defended his UFC Welterweight Championship.
Win	Kamaru Usman	Colby Covington	Decision (unanimous)	UFC 268	November 6, 2021	Defended his UFC Welterweight Championship.
Loss	Kamaru Usman	Leon Edwards	KO (head kick) at 4:04 of round 5	UFC 278	August 20, 2022	Lost his UFC Welterweight Championship.
Loss	Kamaru Usman	Leon Edwards	Decision (majority)	UFC 286	March 18, 2023	For Edwards' UFC Welterweight Championship.

Season 23

Result	TUF Competitor	Opponent	Method	Event	Date	Notes
Loss	Khalil Rountree Jr.	Alex Pereira	TKO (punches) at 4:32 of round 4	UFC 307	October 5, 2024	For Pereira's UFC Light Heavyweight Championship.
Loss	Tatiana Suarez	Zhang Weili	Decision (unanimous)	UFC 312	February 9, 2025	For Zhang's UFC Women's Strawweight Championship.

Season 24

The winner of Season 24 won a fight with Demetrious Johnson. Tim Elliott won the tournament and fought Johnson for the main event on the finale.

Result	TUF Competitor	Opponent	Method	Event	Date	Notes
Loss	Tim Elliott	Demetrious Johnson	Decision (unanimous)	The Ultimate Fighter: Tournament of Champions Finale	December 3, 2016	For Johnson's UFC Flyweight Championship.
Draw	Brandon Moreno	Deiveson Figueiredo	Draw (majority)	UFC 256	December 12, 2020	For Figueiredo's UFC Flyweight Championship.
Win	Brandon Moreno	Deiveson Figueiredo	Submission (rear-naked choke) at 2:26 of round 3	UFC 263	June 12, 2021	For Figueiredo's UFC Flyweight Championship.
Loss	Brandon Moreno	Deiveson Figueiredo	Decision (unanimous)	UFC 270	January 22, 2022	Lost his UFC Flyweight Championship.
Win	Brandon Moreno	Kai Kara-France	TKO (body kick and punches) at 4:34 of round 3	UFC 277	July 30, 2022	For the vacant interim UFC Flyweight Championship; Kara-France was also a TUF competitor.
Win	Brandon Moreno	Deiveson Figueiredo	TKO (doctor stoppage) at 5:00 of round 3	UFC 283	January 21, 2023	For Figueiredo's UFC Flyweight Championship.
Win	Alexandre Pantoja	Brandon Moreno	Decision (split)	UFC 290	July 8, 2023	For Moreno's UFC Flyweight Championship; Moreno was also a TUF competitor.
Win	Alexandre Pantoja	Brandon Royval	Decision (unanimous)	UFC 296	December 16, 2023	Defended his UFC Flyweight Championship.
Win	Alexandre Pantoja	Steve Erceg	Decision (unanimous)	UFC 301	May 4, 2024	Defended his UFC Flyweight Championship.
Win	Alexandre Pantoja	Kai Asakura	Technical Submission (rear-naked choke) at 2:05 of round 2	UFC 310	December 7, 2024	Defended his UFC Flyweight Championship.
Win	Alexandre Pantoja	Kai Kara-France	Submission (rear-naked choke) at 1:55 of round 3	UFC 317	June 28, 2025	Defended his UFC Flyweight Championship; Kara-France was also a TUF competitor.
Loss	Alexandre Pantoja	Joshua Van	TKO (arm injury) at 0:26 of round 1	UFC 323	December 6, 2025	Lost his UFC Flyweight Championship.
Loss	Alexandre Pantoja	Joshua Van	Decision (unanimous)	UFC 331	September 19, 2026	For Van's UFC Flyweight Championship.

Season 26

All fighters of the season were competing to win the inaugural UFC Women's Flyweight Championship. Most of the competitors from the division came from TUF 26.

Result	TUF Competitor	Opponent	Method	Event	Date	Notes
Win	Nicco Montaño	Roxanne Modafferi	Decision (unanimous)	The Ultimate Fighter: A New World Champion Finale	December 1, 2017	For the inaugural UFC Women's Flyweight Championship; Modafferi was also a TUF competitor.
Loss	Lauren Murphy	Valentina Shevchenko	TKO (elbows and punches) at 4:00 of round 4	UFC 266	September 25, 2021	For Shevchenko's UFC Women's Flyweight Championship.
Loss	Gillian Robertson	Mackenzie Dern	Decision (unanimous)	UFC 330	August 15, 2026	For Dern's UFC Women's Strawweight Championship.

The Smashes

Robert Whittaker was scheduled to defend his UFC Middleweight Championship against Yoel Romero at UFC 225: Whittaker vs. Romero 2. However, Romero weighed in over the limit. Whittaker would go on to win a non-title fight.

Result	TUF Competitor	Opponent	Method	Event	Date	Notes
Win	Robert Whittaker	Yoel Romero	Decision (unanimous)	UFC 213	July 8, 2017	For the interim UFC Middleweight Championship.
Loss	Robert Whittaker	Israel Adesanya	KO (punches) at 3:33 of round 2	UFC 243	October 6, 2019	Lost his UFC Middleweight Championship.
Loss	Robert Whittaker	Israel Adesanya	Decision (unanimous)	UFC 271	February 12, 2022	For Adesanya's UFC Middleweight Championship.

Brazil Season 2

Result	TUF Competitor	Opponent	Method	Event	Date	Notes
Loss	Thiago Santos	Jon Jones	Decision (split)	UFC 239	July 6, 2019	For Jones' UFC Light Heavyweight Championship.

Brazil Season 3

Result	TUF Competitor	Opponent	Method	Event	Date	Notes
Loss	Paulo Costa	Israel Adesanya	TKO (punches) at 3:59 of round 2	UFC 253	September 27, 2020	For Adesanya's UFC Middleweight Championship.

Latin America

Result	TUF Competitor	Opponent	Method	Event	Date	Notes
Win	Yair Rodríguez	Josh Emmett	Submission (triangle choke) at 4:19 of round 2	UFC 284	February 12, 2023	For the interim UFC Featherweight Championship.
Loss	Yair Rodríguez	Alexander Volkanovski	TKO (punches) at 4:19 of round 3	UFC 290	July 8, 2023	For Volkanovski's UFC Featherweight Championship.

== See also ==
- RAF Undiscovered
- The Contender
- The Ultimate Surfer
