= Jay Leiderman =

American lawyer (1971–2021)

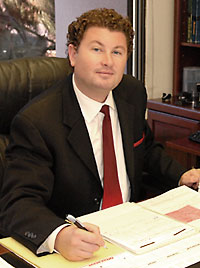
- Born: Jason Scott Leiderman; April 12, 1971; Queens, New York
- Died: September 7, 2021 (aged 50); Ventura, California
- Education: University of Michigan (BA); University of San Francisco (JD)
- Occupation: Lawyer
- Children: 1

Jason Scott "Jay" Leiderman (April 12, 1971 - September 7, 2021) was an American criminal defense lawyer based in Ventura, California. The Atlantic Magazine called Leiderman the "Hacktivist's Advocate" for his work defending hacktivists accused of computer crimes, Including persons associated with Anonymous. BuzzFeed called Leiderman "The Maserati-Driving Deadhead Lawyer Who Stands Between Hackers And Prison" and stated he was "A medical marijuana and criminal defense lawyer from Southern California [who] has made himself into the country's leading defender of hackers."

Leiderman was featured in a video about his life and work on CNN's Great Big Story and appeared in the movie "The Hacker Wars." Leiderman was certified as a criminal law specialist by the California Board of Legal Specialization in 2006.

Leiderman spends much of his time defending the kinds of clients Matlock might turn down on a good day and keeping Ventura's marijuana professionals out of trouble.

Other noteworthy cases Leiderman defended include People v. Diaz, which went to the California Supreme Court and made law on the ability of police to search a cell phone, Louis Gonzalez, who was falsely accused of rape, attempted murder and torture by the mother of his child and was jailed for 83 days before he was released and ultimately found factually innocent, the Andrew Luster or so-called Max Factor heir habeas corpus proceeding, wherein his sentence was reduced by 74 years the first-ever trial of medical marijuana defendants in San Luis Obispo County, California County, and Leiderman represented the lead defendant in Ventura County, California's first concentrated Mexican Mafia prosecution. Leiderman represented journalist Matthew Keys who was found guilty on all charges against him in 2015. Leiderman was the lead trial attorney for Jonathan Koppenhaver, also known as War Machine, who was convicted of savagely beating and raping his girlfriend, porn star Christy Mack.

Within a year at the Ventura County Public Defender's Office, Leiderman had graduated from misdemeanors to murders and three-strike cases. He sought out a series of cases defending the homeless, successfully challenging an open-container law that was frequently used to round up Ventura's large indigent population and getting a raft of misdemeanor illegal camping charges — also used as a weapon against the homeless — thrown out so decisively it led to an internal city review. "It pissed me off, it was a horrific injustice, and it was the right thing to do," Leiderman said."

"Leiderman's years at the VCPDO coincided with the passage of California's medical marijuana statute, and the young lawyer started taking possession for sales and illegal cultivation cases. By the time he opened a private practice, in 2007, Leiderman had become something of an expert in state and county compliance laws. In addition to defending clients from marijuana-related criminal charges, Leiderman also advised medical marijuana collectives, teaching them the law, writing up their contracts and articles of association, and waiting on retainer for run-ins with the police." Leiderman co-authored a book on the legal defense of California medical marijuana crimes, which was published by NORML, the National Organization For the Reform of Marijuana Laws. Leiderman had "some pretty deep connections with Ventura County's medicinal cannabis community".

Leiderman was also a founding member of the Whistleblower's Defense League, "formed to combat what they describe as the FBI and Justice Department's use of harassment and over-prosecution to chill and silence those who engage in journalism, Internet activism or dissent." Leiderman used the phrase "tin foil as reality" when describing the ever encroaching surveillance state. Leiderman frequently commented in diverse areas of the media about criminal and social justice issues. He also lectured around the state and nation on various criminal defense topics.

According to Tor Ekeland, another prominent hacker attorney and sometimes co-counsel to Leiderman, Leiderman was "a "street-smart trial lawyer" who was "extraordinarily quick on his feet." "Leiderman is very much a defense attorney's defense attorney. "It is my duty under the constitution to represent these clients," he wrote in an email, continuing on to say, "I am what stands between the police state and the tyranny of ever encroaching government. If we abandon the ugliest of the cases, before we know it we're back to sending people to prison for a joint.""

Leiderman graduated from the University of Michigan in 1993 and University of San Francisco School of Law in 1999. "He showed up for classes at the University of San Francisco Law School ... with hair halfway down his back, and left in 1999 as the class president. He applied to public defender jobs around the country, and picked Ventura because of the weather."

Leiderman died aged 50 from a heart attack. He is survived by his son Lydon.
