= Kashmir Hill =

American writer and journalist (born 1981)

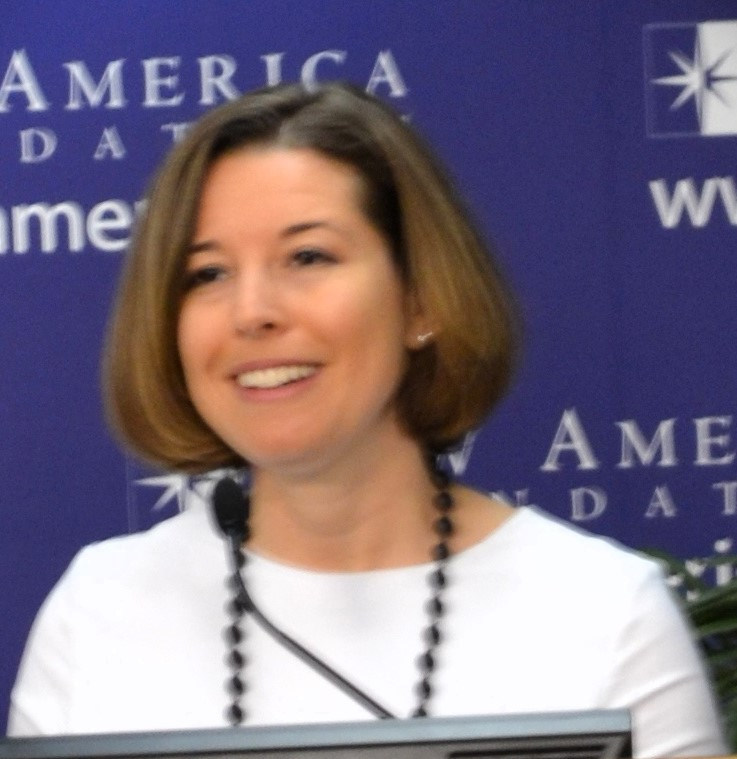
- Hill in 2013
- Born: March 5, 1981 (age 45)
- Occupation: Journalist
- Notable works: Your Face Belongs to Us

Kashmir Hill (born March 5, 1981) is an American technology journalist who writes for The New York Times. Her book Your Face Belongs to Us, about the facial recognition technology of Clearview AI, was published in September 2023.

== Early life and education ==
Hill studied journalism at both Duke University and New York University, receiving her undergrad degree in journalism from Duke and a masters in magazine journalism from NYU.

== Career ==
In January 2020, Hill wrote an article for the New York Times about facial recognition company Clearview AI, describing the company's technology as flawed, which led to privacy-eroding and false arrests by law enforcement agencies due to its erroneous results. In a November 2023 letter to Clearview CEO Hoan Ton-That regarding concerns about the company's collection of the public's biometric information, senator Ed Markey (D–MA) cited Hill's article in The New York Times.

In September 2023, Hill authored the book Your Face Belongs to Us: A Secretive Startup's Quest to End Privacy as We Know It, published by Random House (ISBN 978-1-3985-0918-4). The book discusses Clearview AI's facial recognition technology, use by law enforcement and industry, and how it may threaten individuals' safety and privacy. The book was among the list of "Best books of 2023 – Technology" selected by John Thornhill, an editor with the Financial Times. It was shortlisted for the 2024 Royal Society Trivedi Science Book Prize.

On March 11, 2024, the New York Times published a story authored by Hill in which she wrote about how automakers such as General Motors, Honda, Kia, and Hyundai were sharing driver data with data brokers like LexisNexis in violation of privacy policy. On March 22, 2024, GM announced it was ending the practice. According to her follow-up article on April 30, 2024, senators Ron Wyden (D–OR) and Ed Markey (D–MA) requested the Federal Trade Commission to investigate data sharing practices.

In July 2026, Hill wrote an article for The New York Times titled "I Got Slopped," in which she described learning about a supposed biography of her that was had "all the signs of AI slop" and was "flattering, fabricated and absolutely packed with em dashes."

== Personal life ==
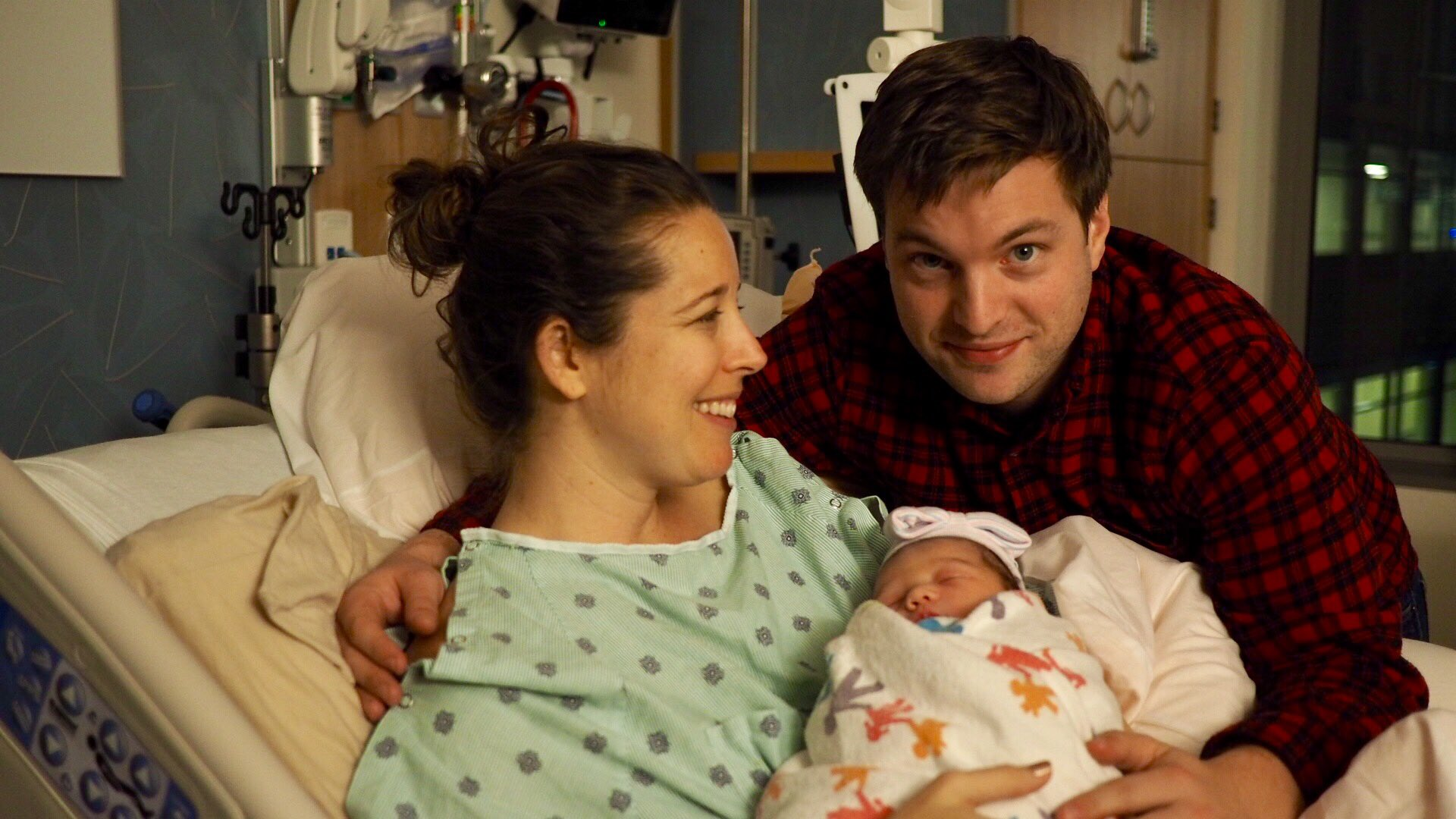
Hill and Trevor Timm as new parents in 2016

Hill is married to Trevor Timm, a journalist and co-founder of the Freedom of the Press Foundation. They have two daughters.

== Awards and honors ==
- 2016 Society for Advancing Business Editing and Writing Honourable Mention
- 2018 National Press Foundation award for "Impactful Journalism"
- 2020 Society for Advancing Business Editing and Writing Innovation Award
- 2020 CSAW Cyber Journalism Award
- 2024 Shortlisted for the 2024 Royal Society Trivedi Science Book Prize
