= Operation Renewed Hope =

Operation to identify previously unknown child sex abuse victims

- Operation name: Operation Renewed Hope
- Type: Child Pornography Investigation
- Scope: multinational

Participants
- Planned by: United States
- Initiated by: U.S. Homeland Security Investigations
- Countries participating: Australia, Austria, Belgium, Brazil, Canada, Columbia, Ecuador, Estonia, France, Germany, Ireland, Spain, United Kingdom
- No. of countries participating: 13

Mission
- Target: previously unidentified child abuse victims and child abusers
- Method: Usage of Clearview AI image recognition technology to reprocess all previously seized images associated with child sexual abuse.

Timeline
- Date begin: July 17, 2023
- Date end: August 9, 2023 (announced results)

Results
- Miscellaneous results: 311 probable identifications of previously unknown victims; 14 previously unidentified abusers

Operation Renewed Hope was an international operation led by the US Homeland Security Investigations Cyber Crimes Center (C3) Child Exploitation Investigations Unit (CEOU), to identify previously unknown and unidentified child sexual abuse victims. The operation began on July 17, 2023, and it was completed in August 2023. Results were announced on August 9, 2023.

== Method ==
HSI teams utilized existing child sexual abuse material (CSAM) as a basis for analysis to comb through and search for unidentified children, offenders, and locations. This information was packaged up to create leads that were then sent to investigative partners. The precise technology or techniques used have not been revealed to the public. However, the leads were shared with HSI field offices and 25 partner countries in the US and abroad.

The process used facial recognition technology from the US-based company Clearview AI among other techniques to identify victims. That AI technology has been banned by some countries including Australia because it breaches their privacy regulations.

== Results ==
The operation allegedly generated:

- 311 probable identifications of previously unknown victims
- 14 positive contacts (which includes several confirmed victim rescues from active abuse)

== Participating groups and law enforcement agencies ==
The following organizations were involved in the operation:

- United States
  - United States Marshals Service
  - United States Department of Justice's Child Exploitation and Obscenity Section
  - Federal Bureau of Investigation (FBI)
  - Northern Virginia Internet Crimes Against Children Task Force
- International partners from:
  - Interpol
  - Europol
  - Australia
  - Austria
  - Belgium
  - Brazil
  - Canada
  - Colombia
  - Ecuador
  - Estonia
  - France
  - Germany
  - Ireland
  - Spain
  - United Kingdom National Crime Agency (NCA)

and Non-Governmental Organizations (NGOs)

- National Center for Missing and Exploited Children (NCMEC)
- International Center for Missing & Exploited Children
- Tim Tebow Foundation
