= War Machine (mixed martial artist) =

American criminal and mixed martial artist (born 1981)

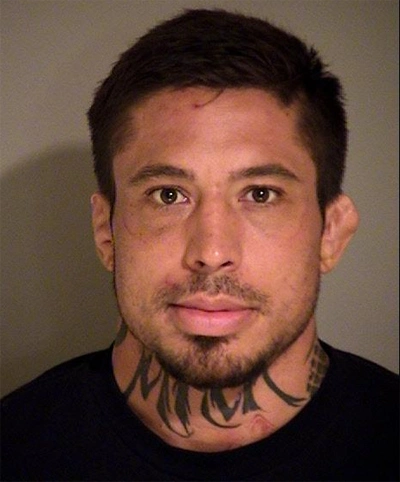
- Mugshot of War Machine after his arrest by U.S. Marshals in 2014
- Born: Jonathan Paul Koppenhaver; November 30, 1981 (age 44); Simi Valley, California, U.S.
- Height: 5 ft 11 in (180 cm)
- Weight: 170 lb (77 kg; 12 st 2 lb)
- Division: Welterweight
- Reach: 72 in (183 cm)
- Stance: Orthodox
- Fighting out of: San Diego, California
- Team: Team Undisputed
- Rank: Black belt in Brazilian jiu-jitsu
- Years active: 2004–2013

Mixed martial arts record
- Total: 19
- Wins: 14
- By knockout: 8
- By submission: 6
- Losses: 5
- By submission: 4
- By decision: 1

Other information
- University: The Citadel Military College of South Carolina
- Mixed martial arts record from Sherdog
- Criminal information
- Status: Incarcerated
- Convictions: Domestic battery (11 counts); Coercion (2 counts); Preventing a victim from reporting a crime (3 counts); First-degree kidnapping (2 counts); Rape (3 counts); Attempted rape; Sexual assault; Battery (6 counts)
- Penalty: Life imprisonment with the possibility of parole after 36 years

Details
- Injured: Christy Mack, Corey Thomas
- Weapon: Kitchen knife
- Date apprehended: August 15, 2014

War Machine (born Jonathan Paul Koppenhaver; (Note: His legal name was changed to War Machine in 2008.) November 30, 1981) is an American former professional mixed martial artist.

Koppenhaver had a 14–5 overall record in MMA fighting in various MMA promotions, including Bellator MMA and the UFC. He competed in the welterweight division. He was a fighter on The Ultimate Fighter: Team Hughes vs. Team Serra as part of Team Serra and also competed for Bellator MMA, Tachi Palace Fights, BAMMA, and the Xtreme Fighting Championships. He also appeared in several pornographic films.

In March 2017, Koppenhaver was convicted on 29 felony counts of rape, kidnapping, domestic battery, and other charges after sexually assaulting and beating his ex-girlfriend, Christy Mack and her then-boyfriend Corey Thomas in 2014. In June 2017, he was sentenced to life in prison with the possibility of parole after 36 years.

== Early life ==
Koppenhaver was born in the Los Angeles suburb of Simi Valley. His German-American father was an officer for the Los Angeles Police Department. His Mexican-American mother worked as a nurse and later became a work-at-home mother. Due to his mother's drug addiction, Koppenhaver would often take care of his younger brother and sister. When he was 13, Koppenhaver suffered a personal trauma when he unsuccessfully performed CPR on his father after he suffered a heart attack.

In August 2000, Koppenhaver attended The Citadel in Charleston, South Carolina, for two years but was expelled for "poor behavior". While attending, he majored in biology. In an interview, Koppenhaver claimed that he had been earning high marks at The Citadel.

== Mixed martial arts career ==
=== The Ultimate Fighter Season Six ===
Koppenhaver was a fighter on The Ultimate Fighter: Team Hughes vs. Team Serra, fighting on Team Serra. He was not part of the original 16 fighters. Instead, Koppenhaver was brought in as a replacement when Roman Mitichyan broke his elbow during evaluations and was sent home. Koppenhaver lost by unanimous decision to Tom Speer. After a dispute with TNA Wrestling over the use of his nickname, he legally changed his name from "Jon Koppenhaver" to "War Machine" in 2008.

=== Ultimate Fighting Championship ===
In War Machine's official UFC debut, he defeated Jared Rollins in The Ultimate Fighter: Team Hughes vs Team Serra Finale via KO at 2:01 of the third round. War Machine and Rollins both received $25,000 due to winning fight of the night honors and War Machine winning knockout of the night. His last UFC fight was at UFC 84 against Yoshiyuki Yoshida which he lost via submission in the first round.

He was released from the UFC after rejecting a fight offered by UFC matchmaker Joe Silva, and after comments made about the death of fellow UFC fighter Evan Tanner. War Machine posted on his Myspace that he believed that Tanner had gone to the isolated southern California desert to kill himself after he realized his career might have been over and basically had made no money during it. Medical examiners eventually ruled that Tanner's death was not a suicide, but War Machine stood by his statements.

=== Bellator Fighting Championships ===
War Machine was signed and then released by Bellator Fighting Championships. His MySpace blog cited disparaging comments about Barack Obama as the cause for his non-participation in their upcoming tournament.

=== Independent promotions (2009–2011) ===
On June 20, 2009, War Machine was set to fight Roger Bowling. They were then set to fight at XFC 9 in Tampa, Florida on September 5, where it was to be the main event and would broadcast live over HDNet's website.

On September 5, 2009, War Machine stepped into the cage and faced off against Mikey Gomez. The ref stopped the fight, giving a somewhat controversial win to War Machine by TKO (punches), at 13 seconds in the third round. War Machine was scheduled to fight October 3, 2009 against Jacob McClintock, but cancelled the fight so he could fight on October 8, 2009, against David Mitchell.

On April 17, 2010, he was set to face Tex Johnson in the main event of Wild Bill's Fight Night. On April 16, TMZ.com reported that War Machine left a comment on his Twitter, stating he would not be turning up to the event for the fight.

=== Return to Bellator Fighting Championships ===
On December 7, 2011, it was announced that War Machine was re-signed to an exclusive deal with Bellator Fighting Championships and would be competing in its sixth-season Welterweight Tournament. War Machine was expected to fight Karl Amoussou in the opening round of the welterweight tournament at Bellator 63. War Machine was sentenced to a year in prison for the prior assault in Las Vegas, Nevada from December 2009 and was forced out of the bout and the tournament.

War Machine was set to make his Bellator debut on January 17, 2013, against Paul Daley when he tore his ACL and broke his fibula which forced him out of the fight. War Machine faced Blas Avena at Bellator 96 on June 19, 2013. He won via TKO due to punches in round one. War Machine then took part in Bellator MMA's Season Nine Welterweight Tournament at Bellator 100 against Vaughn Anderson in the Quarterfinals. He won via technical submission due to a rear naked choke in the second round. War Machine then faced Ron Keslar on October 18, 2013, at Bellator 104 in the semifinals of the Season Nine Welterweight Tournament. He lost via technical submission due to a rear naked choke in the first round. On August 8, 2014, Bellator MMA announced the release of War Machine after he assaulted and raped his former girlfriend, pornographic film actress Christy Mack.

== Adult film career ==
On October 31, 2009, War Machine announced that he would pursue a career in pornographic films along with fighting mixed martial arts. In his announcement, War Machine revealed that he had signed with LA Direct Models and made his debut scene with pornographic actress Riley Steele. War Machine was featured in the January 2014 issue of Hustler magazine in a nude pictorial with Christy Mack.

== Arrests and convictions ==
On September 2, 2007, Koppenhaver was found guilty of striking a Las Vegas man in the face and choking him unconscious during a parking lot scuffle. In February 2008, he was sentenced to three years of probation and 30 days of community service, avoiding the possible felony charge and accompanying prison time. On February 22, 2008, Koppenhaver pleaded guilty to a misdemeanor charge of assault and battery, and was fined and sentenced to probation.

In August 2010, Koppenhaver was sentenced to one year in the county jail for a felony assault conviction stemming from a fight at a Point Loma bar earlier in the year, as well as an additional fight at a bar in Pacific Beach, San Diego. He was imprisoned in San Diego's George Bailey County Detention Facility, mostly in solitary confinement. After going to jail, War Machine maintained his Twitter account as well as a blog documenting his time in jail. On February 1, 2012, it was announced via Koppenhaver's Twitter that he would be serving another year of jail time due to preceding events. He was released on October 29, 2012, after serving two years and two months. He was released out of solitary confinement.

=== Assault upon Christy Mack and Corey Thomas ===
In June 2013 it was reported that Koppenhaver was dating adult film actress Christy Mack, which she confirmed in an interview published that October. According to Mack, Koppenhaver broke up with her in May 2014, and moved back to San Diego.

On August 8, 2014, Koppenhaver assaulted Mack and her boyfriend Corey Thomas in Mack's Las Vegas home. As Mack and Thomas would later testify, Koppenhaver showed up in their bedroom unannounced as Mack and Thomas were in bed. Koppenhaver began punching Thomas and biting his face before placing him in a chokehold. After about 10 minutes, Mack would later testify, Koppenhaver told him to leave the house and not report the incident to police, an order with which Thomas complied. Koppenhaver then began repeatedly punching Mack, causing her to lose consciousness at least once, and kicked her in the side of her body. As she lay on her bathroom floor, Mack said that Koppenhaver told her, "That is my pussy, and I'm going to take it back now." He then either stripped Mack naked or forced her to do so and forced her to shower in front of him. Koppenhaver also stabbed her with a dull knife from her kitchen, and used it to saw off her hair, continuing to threaten her with the blade after the handle broke off. He also took her phone and cancelled all of her appointments for the following week to ensure that her absences would not arouse suspicion. Mack said he also attempted to rape her. Koppenhaver returned to the kitchen, and from the sounds she heard, she believed he was looking for another knife, possibly with which to kill her. Mack jumped out of a second story window, and was found crawling naked on the sidewalk, at which point she was taken to the hospital. She suffered 18 broken bones around her eyes and a broken nose in two places. Koppenhaver also knocked out several of Mack’s teeth. In an August 11, 2014 tweet, Mack described an attack that Koppenhaver had inflicted upon her and her then-boyfriend, Corey Thomas, which included photographs documenting her injuries. Mack stated that although he had beaten her before, he had never done so as badly. Her injuries left her blind in her left eye, and with slurred speech, and unable to chew on account of the missing teeth. Koppenhaver also fractured one of her ribs and severely ruptured her liver when he kicked her. One of her legs was so badly injured that she was not able to walk unaided. The knife attack left her with lesions in multiple areas including her hand, ear, and head.

On August 15, Koppenhaver was apprehended after posting self-pitying tweets, which enabled authorities to trace the IP location of his cell phone. Dog the Bounty Hunter also joined the search. Koppenhaver was arrested in Simi Valley, California, by U.S. Marshals and Simi Valley police after resisting arrest, and was then extradited to Nevada where he was charged with attempted murder and dozens of assault counts, including sexual assault.

On October 14, the same day he was supposed to appear in court to discuss a plea deal, Koppenhaver was found unresponsive in his cell by a corrections officer after attempting to hang himself. A cell officer found Koppenhaver struggling to breathe, with a torn piece of linen around his neck that was tied to the leg of his bunk bed. After the officer cut the linen, Koppenhaver's vitals stabilized within 15 minutes, and he was moved to a medical ward, where he was placed on suicide watch. In a suicide note found in his cell, he quoted philosopher Friedrich Nietzsche twice to explain his actions.

Koppenhaver's trial, originally scheduled for September 2015, was postponed twice before beginning in February 2017. At trial, Koppenhaver was represented by Jay Leiderman and Brandon Sua. On March 20, 2017, he was convicted on 29 of 36 felony counts, including kidnapping and sexual assault with a weapon, for which he faced life in prison. The jury deadlocked on two counts of attempted murder. On June 5, 2017, Koppenhaver was sentenced to an aggregate sentence of life in prison with a possibility of parole after 36 years.

== Championships and accomplishments ==
- Ultimate Fighting Championship
  - UFC.com Awards
    - 2007: Ranked #7 Knockout of the Year & Ranked #4 Fight of the Year vs. Jared Rollins

== Mixed martial arts record ==
Professional record breakdown
19 matches	14 wins	5 losses
By knockout	8	0
By submission	6	4
By decision	0	1

Res.	Record	Opponent	Method	Event	Date	Round	Time	Location	Notes
Loss	14–5	Ron Keslar	Technical Submission (rear-naked choke)	Bellator 104	October 18, 2013	1	3:31	Cedar Rapids, Iowa, United States	Bellator Season Nine Welterweight Tournament Semifinal
Win	14–4	Vaughn Anderson	Technical Submission (rear-naked choke)	Bellator 100	September 20, 2013	2	4:01	Phoenix, Arizona, United States	Bellator Season Nine Welterweight Tournament Quarterfinal
Win	13–4	Blas Avena	TKO (punches)	Bellator 96	June 19, 2013	1	3:55	Thackerville, Oklahoma, United States	
Win	12–4	Roger Huerta	TKO (punches)	UWF 1: Huerta vs. War Machine	November 26, 2011	3	3:09	Pharr, Texas, United States	
Loss	11–4	John Alessio	Technical Submission (rear-naked choke)	TPF 5: Stars and Strikes	July 9, 2010	3	2:24	Lemoore, California, United States	
Win	11–3	Zach Light	Submission (rear-naked choke)	BAMMA 3	May 15, 2010	1	1:09	Birmingham, England	
Loss	10–3	David Mitchell	Decision (split)	TPF 1: Tachi Palace Fights 1	October 8, 2009	3	5:00	Lemoore, California, United States	
Win	10–2	Mikey Gomez	TKO (punches)	XFC 9: Evolution	September 5, 2009	3	0:13	Tampa, Florida, United States	
Win	9–2	Erick Montano	Submission (armbar)	Total Combat 33	July 11, 2009	3	0:47	Mexico City, Mexico	
Win	8–2	Tim Woods	Submission (rear-naked choke)	UWC 6: Capital Punishment	April 25, 2009	2	4:16	Fairfax, Virginia, United States	
Win	7–2	Guillaume DeLorenzi	Submission (rear-naked choke)	XMMA 7: Inferno	February 27, 2009	1	4:13	Montreal, Quebec, Canada	
Win	6–2	David Anderson	KO (punches)	Desert Rage 4	November 8, 2008	1	2:26	Yuma, Arizona, United States	
Loss	5–2	Yoshiyuki Yoshida	Technical Submission (anaconda choke)	UFC 84	May 24, 2008	1	0:56	Las Vegas, Nevada, United States	
Win	5–1	Jared Rollins	KO (punches)	The Ultimate Fighter 6 Finale	December 8, 2007	3	2:01	Las Vegas, Nevada, United States	Knockout of the Night. Fight of the Night
Win	4–1	RJ Gamez	TKO (punches)	Total Combat 16: Annihilation	September 9, 2006	1	2:09	San Diego, California, United States	
Loss	3–1	Mike O'Donnell	Submission (armbar)	GFC: Team Gracie vs Team Hammer House	March 3, 2006	2	4:02	Columbus, Ohio, United States	
Win	3–0	Andrew Ramirez	TKO (corner stoppage)	Total Combat 9	July 30, 2005	1	1:08	Tijuana, Baja California, Mexico	
Win	2–0	Frank Duffy	Submission (rear-naked choke)	Total Combat 4	July 25, 2004	1	0:25	Tijuana, Baja California, Mexico	
Win	1–0	Angel Santibanez	TKO (punch)	Total Combat 2	February 29, 2004	1	1:00	Tijuana, Baja California, Mexico	

== Championships and accomplishments ==
- Ultimate Fighting Championship
  - Fight of the Night (One time)
  - Knockout of the Night (One time)
