= UFC on Fox: Johnson vs. Dodson =

UFC mixed martial arts event in 2013

- The poster for UFC on Fox: Johnson vs. Dodson
- Promotion: Ultimate Fighting Championship
- Date: January 26, 2013
- Venue: United Center
- City: Chicago, Illinois
- Attendance: 16,091
- Total gate: $1,270,000

Event chronology
UFC on FX: Belfort vs. Bisping	UFC on Fox: Johnson vs. Dodson	UFC 156: Aldo vs. Edgar

UFC on Fox: Johnson vs. Dodson (also known as UFC on Fox 6) was a mixed martial arts event held by the Ultimate Fighting Championship on January 26, 2013, at the United Center in Chicago, Illinois.

== Background ==
A bout between Erik Koch and Ricardo Lamas, previously linked to UFC 155, was moved to this event to bolster the main card.

Buddy Roberts was expected to face Michael Kuiper at the event. However, Roberts was forced out of the bout with an illness and was replaced by promotional newcomer Josh Janousek. Then just days before the event, Janousek himself pulled out of the bout citing an injury. With no time to find a suitable replacement for Kuiper, he was pulled from the event as well.

Magnus Cedenblad was expected to face Rafael Natal at the event but was forced out of the bout with an injury and replaced by promotional newcomer Sean Spencer.

== Results ==
Main card (Fox)
Weight class				Method	Round	Time	Notes
Flyweight	Demetrious Johnson (c)	def.	John Dodson	Decision (unanimous) (48–47, 49–46, 48–47)	5	5:00	(Note: For the UFC Flyweight Championship.)
Light Heavyweight	Glover Teixeira	def.	Quinton Jackson	Decision (unanimous) (30–27, 30–27, 29–28)	3	5:00
Lightweight	Anthony Pettis	def.	Donald Cerrone	KO (body kick)	1	2:35
Featherweight	Ricardo Lamas	def.	Erik Koch	TKO (elbows)	2	2:32
Preliminary card (FX)
Lightweight	T. J. Grant	def.	Matt Wiman	KO (elbows and punches)	1	4:51
Featherweight	Clay Guida	def.	Hatsu Hioki	Decision (split) (28–29, 30–27, 29–28)	3	5:00
Welterweight	Pascal Krauss	def.	Mike Stumpf	Decision (unanimous) (30–27, 30–27, 30–27)	3	5:00
Light Heavyweight	Ryan Bader	def.	Vladimir Matyushenko	Submission (guillotine choke)	1	0:50
Heavyweight	Shawn Jordan	def.	Mike Russow	TKO (punches)	2	3:48
Middleweight	Rafael Natal	def.	Sean Spencer	Submission (arm-triangle choke)	3	2:13
Preliminary card (Facebook)
Welterweight	David Mitchell	def.	Simeon Thoresen	Decision (unanimous) (30–27, 30–27, 30–27)	3	5:00

== Bonus awards ==
Fighters were awarded $50,000 bonuses.

- Fight of the Night: Demetrious Johnson vs. John Dodson
- Knockout of the Night: Anthony Pettis
- Submission of the Night: Ryan Bader

== See also ==
- List of UFC events
- 2013 in UFC
