= Hoan Ton-That =

Founder of Clearview AI (born 1988)

- Born: 1988 (age 37–38); Australia
- Occupation: Serial entrepreneur
- Years active: 2009–present
- Known for: Former Chief executive officer at Clearview AI
- Family: Tôn Thất
- Website: hoantonthat.com

Hoan Ton-That (Vietnamese: Tôn Thất Hoàn) is an Australian entrepreneur. He is the co-founder and former chief executive officer of Clearview AI, a United States-based technology company that creates facial recognition software.

== Career ==
According to the New York Times, Ton-That dropped out of university in Australia and moved to San Francisco, California in 2007. He was unsuccessful in early ventures to create social media applications after the advent of Apple's iPhone. In 2009, he created the company HappyAppy and its app ViddyHo, a phishing application/computer worm that spammed a user's contacts. Ton-That was sought by the police when this worm spread in 2009. He then created fastforwarded.com, a similar phishing site. Ton-That later worked at AngelList.

In 2016, Ton-That met Richard Schwartz at the Manhattan Institute for Policy Research. They partnered on an application with Schwartz paying server costs and basic expenses and Ton-That hiring two engineers who worked on software that could scrape images from Internet sources to cross reference on a facial recognition algorithm. It emerged from stealth mode in late 2017 and was linked to far right/alt-right supporters such as Chuck Johnson, Mike Cernovich, Douglass Mackey, and Paul Nehlen.

Clearview AI received investments from Peter Thiel and Naval Ravikant totaling more than $200,000, which later converted into equity in the company. Upon Clearview AI receiving cease-and-desist letters from Google, YouTube, Venmo and LinkedIn, Ton-That appeared on CBS This Morning for an interview with CBS News correspondent Errol Barnett in February 2020.

Ton-That resigned as CEO of Clearview AI in February 2025, announcing plans to remain a board member.

== Views ==
Going back to at least 2015, Huffington Post has linked Ton-That with the "far right clique" of Mike Cernovich, Andrew 'weev' Auernheimer, and Pax Dickinson, as well as close associates of Peter Thiel, Chuck Johnson and Jeff Giesea. Ton-That and associates worked on projects to advance the far- and alt-right political views, and Johnson posted about using face recognition to identify undocumented immigrants in the United States in early 2017. This group, and others, interacted on a Slack chat set up for WeSearchr Two employees at Clearview AI belonged to white nationalist groups and had endorsed those views online. The Verge reached out to Ton-That who was "unaware of the online writings" and said he was "not a white supremacist or an anti-semite." They were reportedly dismissed from the company according to Ton-That in a statement claiming to not be "sympathetic to any of those views."

He has claimed that Clearview AI is exclusively a "law enforcement tool" and stated "that it's fair game to help law enforcement solve crimes using publicly-available data." Lawsuits have been filed in regard to the legality of his company's collection of data. In the EU, Clearview AI's photo database was deemed illegal.

After the Russian invasion of Ukraine, Ton-That contacted the Ukrainian government and offered Clearview AI's facial recognition software and training on that software free of charge.

== Personal life ==
Ton-That descends from a cadet branch (Tôn Thất) of the former ruling family of Vietnam.

== Biography ==
- Hill, Kashmir (2023). Your Face Belongs To Us: The Secretive Startup Dismantling Your Privacy. London, UK: Simon & Schuster UK Ltd. ISBN 9781398509177. OCLC 1389772255.
