= Rudy Washington =

American politician

Deputy Mayor of New York City for Community Development and Business Services
- In office April 5, 1996 – 2001
- Mayor: Rudy Giuliani
- Preceded by: Fran Reiter

Personal details
- Education: John Jay College of Criminal Justice

Rudy Washington is a former American politician. Washington served as Deputy Mayor of New York City under former Mayor Rudy Giuliani. Washington was the only African American to serve as Deputy Mayor under Giuliani.

== Early life and education ==
Washington is the son of Purdy and Sarah Washington. He graduated from the John Jay College of Criminal Justice.

== Political career ==
From 1994 to 1996, Washington served as Commissioner of the New York City Department of Business Services (DBS). Washington was appointed to serve as Deputy Mayor of New York City on April 5, 1996. During his time as Deputy Mayor, he was subject to a high-profile stop-and-frisk by the NYPD, which caused controversy.

In 2007, Washington was chosen by Giuliani to serve as head of his 2008 presidential campaign in New York City. In 2011, Washington criticized Michael Bloomberg for not incorporating a prayer service at the tenth anniversary of the September 11, 2001 attacks.

== Personal life ==
Washington reportedly suffers from respiratory illnesses related to the time he spent at the World Trade Center site.

In August 2021, Washington was named as a member of American facial recognition company Clearview AI's advisory board.
