= Richard Schwartz (politician) =

American politician (born 1959)

- Education: Columbia University; New York University
- Years active: 1980s-present
- Known for: Clearview AI

Richard Schwartz (born c. 1959) is an American politician who has worked with former New York City Mayors Rudy Giuliani, Ed Koch and David Dinkins as well as Henry Stern during his tenure as New York City Parks Commissioner and while he was a member of the New York City Council. During the 1980s, he contributed to the New York City Parks restoration. He also worked for the Manhattan Institute for Policy Research, a conservative think tank. Schwartz authored the Work Experience Program, a welfare reform program. Schwartz founded Opportunity America, a job matching service for welfare recipients, one day after leaving public service in 1997.

== Later career ==
In 2000, Schwartz cofounded clicksafe.com, a porn filter that was approved by the Archdiocese of New York. The app blocked sites belonging to law scholar and Child Online Protection Act (COPA) testifier Lawrence Lessig's, various pages on the COPA website, the Center for Democracy and Technology, ACLU, Electronic Frontier Foundation, and the American Family Association. It was apparently out of business by 2005.

Despite no journalistic experience, Schwartz became the Editorial Editor at the New York Daily News in the 2000s.

From 2005 to 2010, Schwartz was a partner at Source Communications, a New York public relations agency.

Clearview AI's Hoan Ton-That and Schwartz met at the Manhattan Institute. Schwartz joined Clearview AI after that.
