= David Mitchell (fighter) =

American mixed martial arts fighter

- Born: October 24, 1979 (age 46); Berkeley, California, United States
- Other names: Crazy Train; Bulletproof; Daudi
- Height: 6 ft 0 in (1.83 m)
- Weight: 185.6 lb (84.2 kg; 13.26 st)
- Division: Heavyweight; Light Heavyweight; Middleweight; Welterweight
- Reach: 75.5 in (192 cm)
- Fighting out of: Santa Rosa, California, United States
- Team: Team Alpha Male; Nor-Cal Fighting Alliance (formerly)
- Rank: Purple belt in Brazilian Jiu-Jitsu under David Terrell; Black belt in Bwon Kup
- Years active: 2006–present

Mixed martial arts record
- Total: 29
- Wins: 22
- By knockout: 2
- By submission: 17
- By decision: 3
- Losses: 7
- By knockout: 3
- By decision: 4

Other information
- Mixed martial arts record from Sherdog

David Mitchell (born October 24, 1979) is an American mixed martial artist currently competing in the middleweight division. A professional competitor since 2006, Mitchell has formerly competed for the UFC, the World Series of Fighting, Tachi Palace Fights, King of the Cage, and the Absolute Championship Berkut.

== Background ==
Mitchell was born in Berkeley, California, but was raised in Laytonville, California. Mitchell competed in soccer through high school and then went to several community colleges before dropping out and working in construction for six years. Mitchell began training under David Terrell at Terrell's gym in Santa Rosa, California, and year later began competing in professional mixed martial arts.

== Mixed martial arts career ==
=== Early career ===
Mitchell made his professional MMA debut in 2006 and compiled an undefeated record of 11–0 with wins over War Machine, Bobby Green, Tim McKenzie, and Poppies Martinez before being signed by the UFC. Mitchell also won the Tachi Palace Fights Welterweight Championship by defeating McKenzie and then successfully defended the title against Martinez.

=== Ultimate Fighting Championship ===
Mitchell made his UFC debut against TJ Waldburger on September 15, 2010, at UFC Fight Night: Marquardt vs. Palhares. Mitchell lost a unanimous decision (30–27, 30–27, 30–27).

Mitchell was expected to fight Mike Swick on January 22, 2011, at UFC: Fight for the Troops 2. However, Mitchell was forced out of the fight with a back injury and Swick felt as if his stomach condition was not completely healed, so the bout was scrapped from the card altogether.

Mitchell next faced Paulo Thiago on August 27, 2011, at UFC 134. Mitchell lost the fight via unanimous decision.

Mitchell was expected to face UFC newcomer Hyun Gyu Lim as a late replacement for Marcelo Guimarães on November 10, 2012, at UFC on Fuel TV 6. However, prior to the weigh in for the event, the bout was scrapped after Lim was declared medically unfit to compete by UFC doctors.

Mitchell faced Simeon Thoresen on January 26, 2013, at UFC on Fox 6. He won the fight via unanimous decision.

Mitchell faced Mike Pierce on July 6, 2013, at UFC 162. He lost the fight via TKO in the second round, marking the first time he's been finished in his professional career.

Mitchell faced Yan Cabral on October 9, 2013, at UFC Fight Night 29. Cabral defeated Mitchell via unanimous decision.

Following his loss to Cabral, Mitchell was released from the UFC.

=== Post-UFC career ===
Mitchell defeated Fernando Gonzalez in a Middleweight bout via TKO on February 15, 2014, at West Coast Fighting Championship 8. The victory marked the first time Mitchell has finished an opponent via strikes.

He then faced Jaime Jara at WFC 9: Mitchell vs Jara on April 26, 2014. Mitchell won the fight via rear-naked choke submission.

Mitchell was expected to take part in a one-night tournament at BattleGrounds MMA on October 3, 2014. However, he pulled out of the tournament.

On February 28, 2015, in Sacramento, California, US, Mitchell defeated Dave Huckaba via rear-naked choke in the second round to win both the ISCF (International Sport Combat Federation) West Coast Heavyweight Title and the WFC Heavyweight Title.

== Championships and accomplishments ==
=== Mixed martial arts ===
- Final Fight Championship
  - FFC Middleweight Championship (one time)
- Tachi Palace Fights
  - TPF Welterweight Championship (One time)
  - TPF Middleweight Championship (One time)
- West Coast Fighting Championship
  - WCFC Middleweight Championship (One time)
  - WCFC Heavyweight Championship (One time)
- International Sport Combat Federation
  - ISCF West Coast Heavyweight Champion (One time)

== Mixed martial arts record ==
Professional record breakdown
29 matches	22 wins	7 losses
By knockout	2	3
By submission	17	0
By decision	3	4

Res.	Record	Opponent	Method	Event	Date	Round	Time	Location	Notes
Loss	22–7	Ibragim Chuzhigaev	TKO (punches)	ACB 54: Supersonic	March 11, 2017	3	0:55	Manchester, England	
Win	22–6	Andy Manzolo	Submission (guillotine choke)	FFC 27: Night of Champions	December 17, 2016	2	1:30	Zagreb, Croatia	Won vacant FFC Middleweight Championship.
Win	21–6	Richard Blake	Submission (rear-naked choke)	KOTC: Unchallenged	October 8, 2016	1	0:48	Oroville, California, United States	
Win	20–6	Dervin Lopez	Submission (rear-naked choke)	FFC 25: Mitchell vs. Lopez	June 11, 2016	2	1:09	Springfield, Massachusetts, United States	Return to Middleweight.
Loss	19–6	Max Griffin	KO (punch)	WFC 16: Griffin vs. Mitchell	January 23, 2016	1	0:43	Sacramento, California, United States	Catchweight (175 lbs) bout.
Loss	19–5	Marcel Fortuna	Decision (unanimous)	Dragon House 20	June 6, 2015	3	5:00	San Francisco, California, United States	For Dragon House Light Heavyweight Championship.
Win	19–4	Dave Huckaba	Submission (rear-naked choke)	WCFC 13: Huckaba vs. Mitchell	February 28, 2015	2	3:36	Sacramento, California, United States	Heavyweight debut; Won WCFC Heavyweight Championship and the ISCF MMA West Coast Heavyweight Championship.
Win	18–4	Angel DeAnda	Submission (rear-naked choke)	Tachi Palace Fights 22	February 5, 2015	1	3:00	Lemoore, California, United States	Won vacant TPF Middleweight Championship.
Win	17–4	Justin Baesman	Submission (rear-naked choke)	WSOF 16	December 13, 2014	1	1:44	Sacramento, California, United States	Return to Middleweight.
Win	16–4	Michael Gonzalez	TKO (punches)	WFC 12: Ricetti vs. Emmett	November 15, 2014	1	3:42	Sacramento, California, United States	Light Heavyweight bout.
Win	15–4	Matt Major	Submission (guillotine choke)	WFC 11: Mitchell vs. Major	September 13, 2014	1	4:47	Sacramento, California, United States	Won vacant WCFC Middleweight Championship.
Win	14–4	Jaime Jara	Submission (rear-naked choke)	WFC 9: Mitchell vs. Jara	April 26, 2014	1	4:15	Sacramento, California, United States	
Win	13–4	Fernando Gonzalez	TKO (punches)	WFC 8: Avila vs. Berkovic	February 15, 2014	3	1:45	Sacramento, California, United States	Middleweight bout.
Loss	12–4	Yan Cabral	Decision (unanimous)	UFC Fight Night: Maia vs. Shields	October 9, 2013	3	5:00	Barueri, São Paulo, Brazil	
Loss	12–3	Mike Pierce	TKO (punches)	UFC 162	July 6, 2013	2	2:55	Las Vegas, Nevada, United States	
Win	12–2	Simeon Thoresen	Decision (unanimous)	UFC on Fox: Johnson vs. Dodson	January 26, 2013	3	5:00	Chicago, Illinois, United States	
Loss	11–2	Paulo Thiago	Decision (unanimous)	UFC 134	August 27, 2011	3	5:00	Rio de Janeiro, Brazil	
Loss	11–1	TJ Waldburger	Decision (unanimous)	UFC Fight Night: Marquardt vs. Palhares	September 15, 2010	3	5:00	Austin, Texas, United States	
Win	11–0	Poppies Martinez	Technical Submission (triangle choke)	Tachi Palace Fights 5	July 9, 2010	1	1:32	Lemoore, California, United States	Defended TPF Welterweight Championship.
Win	10–0	Tim McKenzie	Submission (guillotine choke)	Tachi Palace Fights 4	May 5, 2010	1	1:10	Lemoore, California, United States	Won vacant TPF Welterweight Championship.
Win	9–0	Bobby Green	Submission (heel hook)	TPF 2: Brawl in the Hall	December 3, 2009	1	0:54	Lemoore, California, United States	
Win	8–0	War Machine	Decision (split)	TPF 1: Tachi Palace Fights 1	October 8, 2009	3	5:00	Lemoore, California, United States	
Win	7–0	Josh Neal	Submission (armbar)	CCFC 10: Battle for NorCal	February 21, 2009	1	0:28	Santa Rosa, California, United States	
Win	6–0	Jeff Morris	Submission (armbar)	CCFC: Mayhem	May 17, 2008	1	1:47	Santa Rosa, California, United States	
Win	5–0	Andy Maccarone	Decision (unanimous)	CCFC: Meltdown	August 18, 2007	3	5:00	Yuba City, California, United States	
Win	4–0	Drew Dimanlig	Submission (armbar)	CCFC: Total Elimination	May 12, 2007	2	N/A	Santa Rosa, California, United States	
Win	3–0	Jeff Harmon	Submission (rear-naked choke)	CCFC: Throwdown at the Pavilion	November 4, 2006	2	1:23	Santa Rosa, California, United States	
Win	2–0	Kenneth Johnson	Submission (rear-naked choke)	Gladiator Challenge 55: Beatdown	October 14, 2006	1	2:54	Lakeport, California, United States	
Win	1–0	John Corstorphine	Submission (triangle choke)	Gladiator Challenge 52: Deep Impact	July 8, 2006	1	3:30	Lakeport, California, United States	

== See also ==
- List of current mixed martial arts champions
- List of male mixed martial artists
