= Lee S. Wolosky =

American National Security Council staffer and lawyer

Lee Wolosky
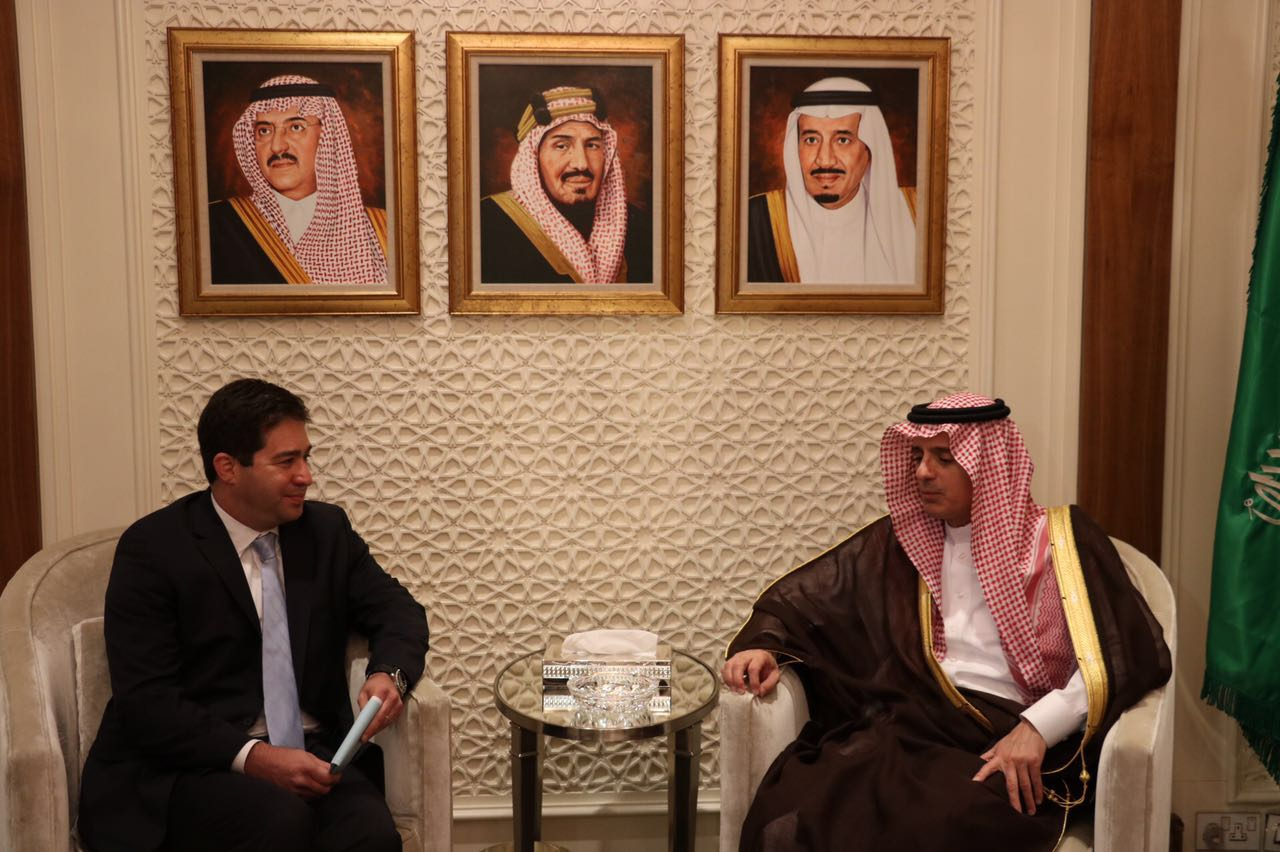
- Wolosky and Saudi Foreign Minister, Adel al-Jubeir

United States Special Envoy for the Closure of the Guantánamo Bay Detention Facility
- In office July 6, 2015 – January 20, 2017
- President: Barack Obama
- Preceded by: Cliff Sloan

Personal details
- Born: July 17, 1968 (age 58) New York City, New York, U.S.
- Party: Democratic
- Education: Harvard University (BA, JD)

Lee Scott Wolosky (born July 17, 1968) is an American diplomat and attorney who served under four U.S. presidents in legal and national security positions, most recently as Special Counsel to Former President Joe Biden. He is currently a partner at the international law firm of Willkie Farr & Gallagher LLP.

== Early life ==
Wolosky grew up in The Bronx and attended Columbia Grammar & Preparatory School in Manhattan. He graduated magna cum laude from Harvard College, where he was a recipient of the John Harvard Scholarship and the Harvard College Scholarship. Before attending law school, Wolosky worked as a research assistant for a Harvard University project focused on Soviet political and economic reform. He graduated cum laude from Harvard Law School, where he was an editor of the Harvard International Law Journal and a recipient of the Frederick Sheldon Traveling Fellowship. While in law school, he served as an intern to Sonia Sotomayor, then a federal district court judge.

== Government ==
Wolosky served as Director for Transnational Threats on the United States National Security Council in the White House Office, under President Bill Clinton and George W. Bush. The Transnational Threats Directorate was responsible for coordinating the U.S. Government's response to terrorism prior to the September 11 attacks. At the White House, Wolosky had specific responsibility for coordinating U.S. policy relating to illicit finance impacting national security.

Wolosky's work at the White House also included directing sensitive operations, including leading the U.S. government effort to apprehend the Taliban and al Qaeda-linked arms trafficker Viktor Bout. Wolosky was noted for his innovative approach for pursuing Bout. Wolosky's pursuit of Bout served as a loose basis for the character Jack Valentine (played by Ethan Hawke) in the film Lord of War.

Wolosky has served as a consultant to various agencies of the U.S. Government in recent years and has testified on several occasions before the United States Congress. He also testified before the 9/11 Commission in both open and closed sessions.

During 2003 and 2004, Wolosky served as a senior advisor to the presidential campaign of Senator John Kerry and as co-director of the campaign's counter-terrorism policy coordinating group.

Wolosky is a life member of the Council on Foreign Relations. He served as co-director of the Council on Foreign Relation's Independent Task Force on Terrorist Financing and deputy director of the Council on Foreign Relations's Independent Task Force on Russia. He was also a co-founder and member of the board of directors of the National Security Network. He was appointed to the American Bar Association's Standing Committee on Law and National Security in 2010.

Wolosky has also served as an adjunct professor at the School of International and Public Affairs, Columbia University

=== Guantanamo ===
As Special Envoy for Guantanamo Closure from July 2015 to January 2017, Wolosky served as chief U.S. diplomat in connection with Barack Obama's efforts to close the Guantanamo Bay detention camp. Among other responsibilities, he led the Obama Administration's final diplomatic efforts to reduce the detainee population before the end of Obama's term, by transferring detainees who had been unanimously approved for transfer by the United States Secretary of Defense, State, Attorney General, Secretary of Homeland Security, Chairman of the Joint Chiefs of Staff, and Director of National Intelligence.

During his 18-month tenure as Special Envoy, Wolosky completed the transfer of 75 detainees to 15 countries, or almost 40% of all such transfers during President Obama's eight-year term in office.

Since closure of the Office by the first Trump administration, the U.S. government has lost track of several of the Guantanamo detainees Wolosky arranged to release.

== Legal career ==
In 2001, Wolosky joined Boies, Schiller & Flexner LLP, the prominent U.S. law firm led by David Boies whose partners are known for high-profile matters such as the representation of Al Gore in the contested 2000 U.S. presidential election, representation of the U.S. Government in its anti-trust dispute with Microsoft, and representation of American International Group and its former CEO, Maurice R. Greenberg. During his time at Boies Schiller, Wolosky led or co-led some of the firm's high-profile matters, including the firm's representation of Greenberg, its representation of former RNC Vice Chair Elliott Broidy in litigation against Qatar, its terrorism financing case against Bank of China; and Restis v United Against Nuclear Iran, a precedent-setting private defamation case in which the United States Government asserted the state secrets privilege, resulting in a victory for Wolosky's client UANI. Wolosky also served as co-lead counsel to certain of the 9/11 families in connection with a multibillion-dollar federal court judgment entered against Iran; and as lead counsel to a major international corporation in matters arising out of an alleged assault by Dominique Strauss-Kahn, the former managing director of the International Monetary Fund.

In October 2019, Wolosky was appointed Independent Monitor of Deutsche Bank by the New York State Department of Financial Services and urged the bank to exit Russia. Wolosky has also represented Fiona Hill, a former advisor on the United States National Security Council, in the 2019 impeachment hearings of Donald Trump and opposed the White House's efforts to prevent her testimony. He has also represented MSNBC anchor Nicolle Wallace, and Emmy Award-winning journalist Lowell Bergman. Neil Cavuto, the conservative Fox News anchor, has called Wolosky "one of the brightest lawyers in the country."

In 2020, Wolosky joined Jenner & Block LLP, where he served as a co-Chair of the Litigation Department and as a member of the firm's Management Committee. Previously, he worked at Paul, Weiss, Rifkind, Wharton & Garrison and as an international affairs fellow at the Council on Foreign Relations. At Paul Weiss, he worked principally with and was mentored by Ted Sorensen, the seventh White House Counsel under John F. Kennedy and Lyndon B. Johnson.

In August 2021, Wolosky was named to the advisory board of American facial recognition company Clearview AI as of counsel.

As of 2025, Wolosky serves as lead counsel on behalf of hundreds of U.S. victims of the October 7 attacks in a groundbreaking lawsuit against US-Palestinian billionaire Bashar Masri for allegedly aiding and abetting Hamas. Days after the lawsuit was filed, Masri was relieved of his role on a Harvard University Advisory Council. Wolosky is also leading litigation against the University of California, Berkeley for alleged anti-semitism.

== See also ==
- Clearview AI

Diplomatic posts
| Preceded by Cliff Sloan | United States Special Envoy for the Closure of the Guantánamo Bay Detention Facility; 2015–2017 | Incumbent |
