= 2009 in Tachi Palace Fights =

Information
- First date: July 16, 2009
- Last date: December 3, 2009

Events
- Total events: 3

Fights
- Total fights: 22

Chronology
2009 in Tachi Palace Fights	2010 in Tachi Palace Fights

The year 2009 is the first year in the history of Tachi Palace Fights, a mixed martial arts promotion based in The United States. In 2009 Tachi Palace Fights held 3 events beginning with, TPF: Best of Both Worlds.

== Events list ==
#	Event title	Date	Arena	Location
3	TPF 2: Brawl in the Hall	December 3, 2009	Tachi Palace	Lemoore, California
2	TPF 1: Tachi Palace Fights 1	October 8, 2009	Tachi Palace	Lemoore, California
1	TPF: Best of Both Worlds	July 16, 2009	Tachi Palace	Lemoore, California

== TPF: Best of Both Worlds ==
TPF: Best of Both Worlds was an event held on March 5, 2009 at the Tachi Palace in Lemoore, California.

=== Results ===
Main Card
Weight class				Method	Round	Time	Notes
	Chad Mendes	def.	Steven Siler	KO (Punches)	1	0:44
	Shawn Bias	def.	Shawn Klarcyk	Decision (Majority)	3	3:00
	Cody Gibson	def.	Dustin Rocha	TKO (Punches)	2	0:42
	Sergio Quinones	def.	Chris Sanchez	Submission (Arm-Triangle Choke)	1	1:54
	Brandon Lorenze	def.	Mark Matthews	KO (Punches)	1	2:39

== TPF 1: Tachi Palace Fights 1 ==
TPF 1: Tachi Palace Fights 1 was an event held on October 8, 2009 at the Tachi Palace in Lemoore, California.

=== Results ===
Main Card
Weight class				Method	Round	Time	Notes
	Chad Mendes	def.	Mike Joy	Decision (Unanimous)	3	5:00
	David Mitchell	def.	War Machine	Decision (Split)	3	5:00
	Joe Soto	def.	Mike Christensen	Submission (Gogoplata)	1	2:06
	Poppies Martinez	def.	Sergio Salcido	Submission (Guillotine Choke)	2	3:21
	Ulysses Gomez	def.	Martin Sandoval	Submission (Rear-Naked Choke)	2	0:36
	Leopoldo Serao	def.	Phil Collins	Decision (Split)	3	5:00
	Michelle Ould	def.	Jessica Rakoczy	TKO (Punches)	2	1:40
	Michael McDonald	def.	Carlos Garces	TKO (Punches)	1	2:01
	Francisco Loredo	def.	Chris Tangonan	Decision (Split)	3	5:00

== TPF 2: Brawl in the Hall ==
TPF 2: Brawl in the Hall was an event held on December 3, 2009 at the Tachi Palace in Lemoore, California.

=== Results ===
Main Card
Weight class				Method	Round	Time	Notes
	Anthony Ruiz	def.	Xavier Foupa-Pokam	Decision (Unanimous)	3	5:00
	Diego Saraiva	def.	Eddie Yagin	TKO (Doctor Stoppage)	3	3:07
	Ulysses Gomez	def.	Chino Nicolas	Submission (Guillotine Choke)	1	4:31
	Cyrille Diabate	def.	Rob Smith	Submission (Rear-Naked Choke)	1	1:47
	David Mitchell	def.	Bobby Green	Submission (Toe Hold)	1	0:54
	Jesse Bowen	def.	Shawn Klarcyk	TKO (Punches)	1	2:08
	Romulo Melo	def.	Cody Canterbury	Submission (Rear-Naked Choke)	1	2:17
	Cody Gibson	def.	Ray Cervera	Decision (Unanimous)	3	5:00

== See also ==
- Tachi Palace Fights
