= Simeon Thoresen =

Norwegian mixed martial arts fighter

- Born: March 14, 1984 (age 42); Sandefjord, Norway
- Other names: The Grin
- Nationality: Norwegian
- Height: 185 cm (6 ft 1 in)
- Weight: 78 kg (172 lb)
- Division: Welterweight
- Reach: 79 in (201 cm) (6 ft 7 in)
- Fighting out of: Oslo, Norway
- Team: Hellboy MMA
- Years active: 2006–present

Mixed martial arts record
- Total: 23
- Wins: 17
- By knockout: 1
- By submission: 15
- By decision: 1
- Losses: 5
- By knockout: 2
- By decision: 3
- Draws: 1

Other information
- Mixed martial arts record from Sherdog
- Last updated on: 02.07.2011

Simeon Thoresen (born March 14, 1984) is a Norwegian mixed martial artist currently competing in the Welterweight division of Cage Warriors. A professional competitor since 2006, he formerly competed for the UFC, DEEP, and BAMMA.

== Mixed martial arts career ==
=== Background ===
He started training karate at an early age, but choose to devote himself to gymnastics instead at the age of 8.

Thoresen started training BJJ and Thai Boxing in 2003 with Jan T. Stange. With no experience in grappling he was dominated and humiliated by a grappler during a training session. This experience led Thoresen to start training extensively on his ground game. He trained with Team Valhall and Team Pammachon in Sandefjord for a while and won his first and only amateur MMA match in 2005.

After that he moved on to Oslo and Hellboy Hansen MMA in order to train full-time. He attributes much of his success to his training under Joachim Hansen. Hansen in turn has describe Thoresen as “a guy with amazing talent, who I truly believe will be a champion in the future.”

=== Early career ===
Thoresen made his professional debut in August 2006 with a win over Clifford Hall at Intense Fighting 5: Caged. He still maintains close ties with Team Valhall and is usually cornered during his matches by Valhall Gym's main MMA coach Tommy Rasmussen and Jan T. Stange.

At Adrenaline 2: Rise of the Champions he defeated Brazilian jiu-jitsu purple belt André Mineus and amateur Shooto champion Cole Lauritsen to win the Adrenaline Sports welterweight title in Denmark. He never defended his title and on December 7, 2008 Adrenaline announced that Thoresen "has forfeit his championship belt, since he has signed a contract with a very big promotion in Japan."

Thoresen debuted for the DEEP in October 2008, losing to Eiji Ishikawa by majority decision. Following the loss, Thoresen competed primarily in England for promotions such as Cage Wars and BAMMA. He amassed an impressive streak (7 wins, 1 loss and 1 draw) over the next two and half years.

=== Ultimate Fighting Championship ===
Thoresen confirmed that he had signed a multi-fight contract with the UFC on December 29, 2011.

In his debut, Thoresen faced fellow newcomer Besam Yousef on April 14, 2012 at UFC on Fuel TV: Gustafsson vs. Silva. He won the fight via submission in the second round.

Thoresen next fought Seth Baczynski on September 22, 2012 at UFC 152. Thoresen used his reach to keep Baczynski at bay and landed several big punches that caused a gash on the nose of Baczynski, Thoresen was then knocked out by a punch from Baczynski late in the first round.

Thoresen faced David Mitchell on January 26, 2013 at UFC on Fox 6. Thoresen lost the fight via unanimous decision and was subsequently released from the promotion.

=== Post-UFC career ===
Thoresen was expected to face Peter Sobotta at MMA Attack 4 on October 26, 2013, however the event was cancelled.

Due to his previous fight being cancelled, Thoresen was then scheduled for a fight against Domingos Mestre at Superior Challenge 9 on November 13, 2013. However, Thoresen was forced from the bout due to injury.

In February, 2014, one year post his UFC career, Thoresen signed a five-fight deal with Cage Warriors. His first fight was on June 7, 2014 against Jake Bostwick at Cage Warriors Fighting Championship 69. He lost the fight via majority decision.

March 28, 2015, Thoresen fought Jack Mason at British Challenge MMA 10 in Colchester, Essex, England. He lost the fight via unanimous decision.

== Championships and accomplishments ==
=== Mixed martial arts ===
- Ultimate Warrior Challenge
  - UWC Welterweight Championship (One time)

== Mixed martial arts record ==
Professional record breakdown
24 matches	17 wins	6 losses
By knockout	1	2
By submission	15	0
By decision	1	4
Draws	1	

Res.	Record	Opponent	Method	Event	Date	Round	Time	Location	Notes
Loss	17–6–1	Jack Mason	Decision (unanimous)	British Challenge MMA 10	March 28, 2015	3	5:00	Colchester, England	Catchweight (175 lb) bout.
Loss	17–5–1	Jake Bostwick	Decision (majority)	Cage Warriors FC 69	June 7, 2014	3	5:00	London, England	
Loss	17–4–1	David Mitchell	Decision (unanimous)	UFC on Fox: Johnson vs. Dodson	January 26, 2013	3	5:00	Chicago, Illinois, United States	
Loss	17–3–1	Seth Baczynski	KO (punch)	UFC 152	September 22, 2012	1	4:10	Toronto, Ontario, Canada	
Win	17–2–1	Besam Yousef	Submission (rear-naked choke)	UFC on Fuel TV: Gustafsson vs. Silva	April 14, 2012	2	2:36	Stockholm, Sweden	
Win	16–2–1	Manuel Garcia	Submission (rear-naked choke)	Ultimate Warrior Challenge 17	October 10, 2011	1	0:34	Southend-on-Sea, England	Defended the UWC Welterweight Championship.
Win	15–2–1	Fabricio Nascimento	Submission (rear-naked choke)	Ultimate Warrior Challenge 16	July 2, 2011	1	2:35	Essex, England	Won the UWC Welterweight Championship.
Loss	14–2–1	Seydina Seck	TKO (punches & knees to the body)	ADFC: Round 3	March 11, 2011	1	2:02	Abu Dhabi, United Arab Emirates	
Win	14–1–1	Vaidas Valancius	Submission (rear naked choke)	Cage Wars	December 10, 2010	1	4:44	Belfast, Northern Ireland	
Win	13–1–1	Marco Santi	Submission (rear naked choke)	BAMMA 4	September 25, 2010	1	3:59	Birmingham, England	
Win	12–1–1	John Maguire	Decision (unanimous)	BAMMA 3	May 15, 2010	3	5:00	Birmingham, England	
Draw	11–1–1	Michael Costa	Draw	Art of War 14	September 26, 2009	2	5:00	Cotai, Macau	
Win	11–1	Sam Rocha	Submission (rear-naked choke)	Pain and Glory: Underground	May 24, 2009	1	0:44	London, England	
Win	10–1	Aurelijus Kerpe	Submission (arm-triangle choke)	Pain and Glory: Underground	May 24, 2009	2	N/A	London, England	
Loss	9–1	Eiji Ishikawa	Decision (majority)	DEEP: 38 Impact	October 23, 2008	2	5:00	Tokyo, Japan	
Win	9–0	Matt Thorpe	Submission (kimura)	Cage Warriors: Enter the Rough House 7	July 12, 2008	1	0:51	Nottingham, England	
Win	8–0	Cole Lauritsen	Submission (armbar)	Adrenaline 2: Rise of the Champions	April 12, 2008	1	4:03	Denmark	
Win	7–0	Andre Mineus	Submission (armbar)	Adrenaline 2: Rise of the Champions	April 12, 2008	2	1:30	Denmark	
Win	6–0	Paul Jenkins	Submission (armbar)	Ultimate Warrior Challenge 6	March 1, 2008	1	1:06	Essex, England	
Win	5–0	Chas Jacquier	TKO (strikes)	Ultimate Warrior Challenge 5	November 10, 2007	1	3:04	England	
Win	4–0	Soli Clichko	Submission (armbar)	Ultimate Warrior Challenge 4	June 2, 2007	1	1:33	England	
Win	3–0	Clifford Hall	Submission (triangle choke)	Ultimate Warrior Challenge 3	February 24, 2007	1	2:16	England	
Win	2–0	Lee Dickson	Submission (triangle choke)	Ultimate Warrior Challenge 2	November 4, 2006	2	4:01	Southend, England	
Win	1–0	Clifford Hall	Submission (triangle choke)	Intense Fighting 5	August 19, 2006	2	1:12	England	

== See also ==
- List of male mixed martial artists
