= Christy Mack =

American model and pornographic film actress (born 1991 or 1992)

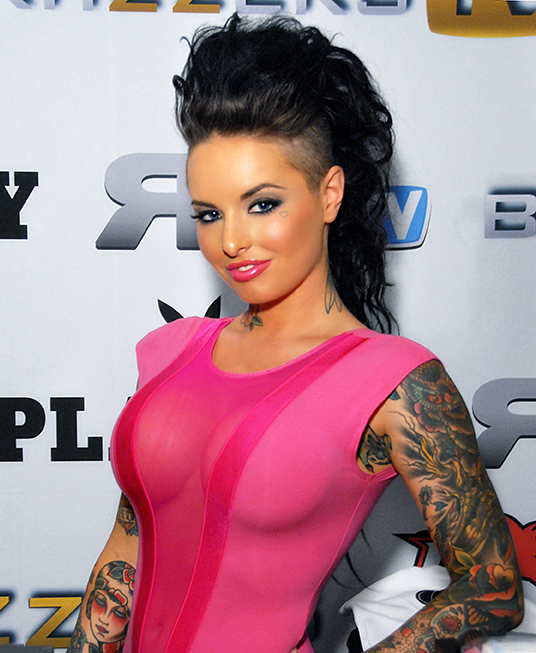
- Mack in 2013
- Born: Christine Mackinday; 1991 or 1992 (age 34–35)
- Occupations: Erotic model; pornographic film actress
- Years active: 2011–2014
- Partner: Jonathan Koppenhaver (2013–2014)
- Website: direct.me/christymack

Christine Mackinday (born 1991 or 1992), known professionally as Christy Mack, is an American former pornographic film actress.

== Early life ==
Mack grew up in Edinburgh, Indiana, where she was a cheerleader. She married at the age of eighteen but later left her husband and moved to Miami where she began her career.

== Career ==
Mack portrayed DC Comics character Zatanna in the 2012 porn parody The Dark Knight XXX. In April 2013, Mack launched her official website with Puba, and in November, Fleshlight released Attack and Booty, her signature sex toys.

In a 2013 interview with Vice, Mack stated that she planned to retire from performing in adult videos once she had earned enough money to do so. By July 2014, she said she had not performed in a new scene in ten months. She confirmed her retirement in an April 2015 ESPN story. In 2016, Mack launched a clothing line with the website Pornhub to raise money for domestic violence survivors, following her assault by her ex-boyfriend, mixed martial artist War Machine.

== Personal life ==
Mack began a relationship with mixed martial artist War Machine (born Jonathan Koppenhaver) in 2013. She says Koppenhaver became physically abusive toward her a few months later. The relationship ended sometime before August 2014, when Mack and her then-boyfriend Corey Thomas were assaulted by Koppenhaver in her Las Vegas home. Mack sustained eighteen broken bones, a broken nose, missing teeth, a fractured rib, a ruptured liver, and a thigh bruise that made her unable to walk for a week. Mack says Koppenhaver also attempted to rape her at knifepoint, but was unable to maintain an erection. Koppenhaver was later found guilty of sexual assault and kidnapping and sentenced to life in prison with a possibility of parole after thirty-six years.

== Awards and nominations ==
Year	Ceremony	Category	Work	Result
2013	FreeOnes	Miss FreeOnes	—N/a	Won
2013	FreeOnes	Best Newcomer	—N/a	Won
2013	Venus Award	Best Actress International	—N/a	Won
2014	AVN Award	Best All-Girl Group Sex Scene (with Lexi Belle, Bonnie Rotten & Gia DiMarco)	Brazzers Presents: The Parodies 3	Nominated
2014	AVN Award	Best Boy/Girl Sex Scene (with Toni Ribas)	Planting Seeds 3	Nominated
2014	AVN Award	Best Group Sex Scene (with Kelly Madison, Kendra Lust, Anikka Albrite, Brooklyn Chase, Jacky Joy, Romi Rain & Ryan Madison)	The Madison's Mad Mad Circus	Nominated
2014	AVN Award	Best New Starlet	—N/a	Nominated
2014	AVN Award	Best Tease Performance	Trashy	Nominated
2014	AVN Award	Best Three-Way Sex Scene – G/G/B (with Bailey Blue & Toni Ribas)	I Am Christy Mack	Nominated
2014	AVN Award	Most Promising New Starlet (Fan Award)	—N/a	Won
2014	XBIZ Award	Best New Starlet	—N/a	Won
2014	XBIZ Award	Crossover Star of the Year	—N/a	Nominated
2014	XBIZ Award	Performer Site of the Year	ChristyMack.com	Nominated
2014	XRCO Award	New Starlet	—N/a	Nominated
2015	XCritic Award	Special Recognition Award	—N/a	Won
2018	Inked Award	Bill Snyder Achievement Award	—N/a	Won
