= Precobs =

Precobs is a predictive policing-software using algorithms and knowledge about crimes committed in the past to predict the commitment of so-called "near repeat"-crimes. Precobs is an abbreviation and stands for Pre Crime Observation System. It is developed and sold by the Institut für musterbasierte Prognosetechnik (Institute for pattern-based Prediction Technique) – IfmPt – located in Oberhausen, Germany.

== The concept of near repeat-prediction ==
Precobs is used to forecast the commitment of "near repeat crimes", at the moment basically for the burglary prevention. The knowledge about near repeats bases on the experience that crimes of the below mentioned categories are often not committed only once, but several times within a close geographical and temporal context, the so-called spatiotemporal proximity (see also Crime Contagion Models). Near repeat crimes are typically repeated within 72 hours. Apart from burglary, those crimes can be:

- Street robbery,
- armed robbery and
- motor vehicle theft.

Behind the concept of near repeats stands the empirical observation that "crime clusters in space and time". Different international studies about near repeat burglary have revealed patterns in the geographical and temporal connection of committed break-ins. The highest risk of a near repeat exists within 48 hours after the first crime. Afterwards, it remains for approximately one month. Johnsons and Bowers concluded after the analysis of burglary data from Merseyside, UK: "The central conclusion is that a burglary event is a predictor of significantly elevated rates of burglary within 1–2 months and within a range of up to 300–400 metres of a burgled home."

Two approaches try to explain this phenomenon: According to the "boost hypothesis", a past victimization "boosts" the probability of becoming a victim again. It is argued that the perpetrator returns to the place of the first crime to make use of his knowledge about this area. In contrast, the "flag hypothesis" refers to the attractiveness of the target. Perpetrators will generally focus on attractive targets.

== Application and advantages ==
The Precobs-software is based on the existing knowledge about burglaries of the past. It uses so-called "triggers" and "anti-triggers" to determine the probability of near repeats. Trigger criteria are characteristics about the site of crime, the way of how the crime was committed (modus operandi), the stolen items and the date of the crime. If certain trigger criteria are fulfilled, the system qualifies the crime as a potential near repeat. The existence of anti-triggers, in contrast, prevents the system from near repeat alerts. This can be, for example, the intentional breaking of window glass. Such a modus operandi would indicate a non-professional background which lowers the likelihood of a near repeat significantly. Furthermore, past success rates of the software play an important role. The software analyses this data and predicts future crimes in a geographical radius of 250m and in a time window of between 24 hours and 7 days.

The forecast is depicted by a map which contains spatial and temporal information. In past applications, Precobs could reach a prediction accuracy of around 80%. Correspondingly, authorities which use Precobs, do not have to deploy staff for the time-consuming research for near repeat crimes or burglary series anymore.

First, the Precobs-warning is reassessed by a human police officer. Then, authorities can use this information to send out patrols much more specifically to prevent expected future crimes. The police forces can operate undercover to observe suspects or avoid crimes by patrolling the relevant areas. Precobs warnings can be subject of police internal use only. However, the data can also be used to inform the public about areas in which future crimes are expected. The Police in Aargau, Switzerland, for example, uses a mobile app to publish certain Precobs warnings. The so-called KaPo-App provides the users with push messages which speak out alerts for specific areas or villages. The KaPo-App can be downloaded by everyone.

Precobs was tested first in the Swiss cantons Zurich, Baselland and Aargau and in the Bavarian cities Munich and Nuremberg. According to statements of the Zurich Police authority, numbers of burglary could be reduced by 30% compared to the previous year. Similar results could be achieved in certain areas of Bavaria, where the numbers decreased by between 17.5 and 42%.

On 24 June 2015, the Bavarian Ministry of the Interior, for Building and Transport announced the permanent use of predictive policing-software.

== Criticism and disadvantages ==
The use of Precobs has risen different questions and concerns.

One of the main concerns of predictive policing software in general and hence of Precobs refers to the use of data the software needs to forecast any crimes. Since the software does not use any personal information and the final decision is always met by a police officer, the Bavarian Data Security Officer has qualified Precobs as unproblematic. However, critics of Precobs refer to the possibility of enriching the near repeat prediction process with data deriving from the internet of things and social networks. For example, a 2014 published study suggests that the use of real time Twitter messages could improve automated crime prediction significantly.

Other authors believe that the use of Precobs or comparable systems could be a justification for authorities to broadly expand the collection of data.

Furthermore, critics question the reliability of the data produced by predictive policing systems. Generally, the causal link between the reduction in crime numbers and the use of predictive policing software has been doubted. When tested in Nuremberg, Germany, for example, numbers of break-ins first decreased in the typically burglary-intensive autumn, but then went up again in December. One of the often articulated concerns in this context is that authorities might tend to rely too easily on software predictions instead of their grown experience.

Moreover, Precobs' predictions base on the assumption that crimes which were committed incidentally do not possess a relevant probability of a near repeat. Accordingly, the software can only forecast burglaries committed by professionally acting criminals. Hence, the scope of the system is limited.

The system depends on the data fed in by the authorities. With regard to a high dark figure of burglaries, the use of systems like Precobs might narrow down the focus of the authorities too much on a specific area. In addition, especially professional criminals could adapt to the system. Knowing that authorities use a predictive policing software, criminals could switch to other geographical areas or adopt a specific behavior to mislead the software. This could finally lead to a "run" of mutual behavior prediction.

A further problem arises, when the data produced by the software is published like in the case of the Aargau Police App. The publication of such information could alienate the population and create a mood of fear.
