= Charles C. Johnson =

American political activist

- Born: Charles Carlisle Johnson; October 22, 1988 (age 38); Boston, Massachusetts, U.S.
- Education: Claremont McKenna College
- Occupations: Political activist, tech entrepreneur/investor, troll
- Years active: 2013–2019

Charles Carlisle Johnson (born October 22, 1988) is an American political activist who was a public figure in the years 2013 to 2019. A self-described "investigative journalist", Johnson is often described as an internet troll and has been repeatedly involved in the proliferation and spread of multiple fake news stories. Johnson was owner of the alt-right websites GotNews.com, WeSearchr.com, and Freestartr.com, all of which were short-lived. He wrote two books, both published by Encounter Books in 2013.

Johnson indicated he was a federal informant, as reported by Business Insider, and through a federal lawsuit against Clearview AI. The Epstein Transparency Files Act confirmed Johnson's role as a source for the FBI on Israeli espionage in the United States.

In 2025, Johnson was found liable for civil racketeering and ordered to pay at least $71 million to the plaintiffs. They accused him of falsely portraying himself as a U.S. intelligence asset with the aim of extorting them for large sums of money and equity. Johnson appealed to the Fifth Circuit Court of Appeals. On November 20, 2025, Johnson was sent to jail for contempt of court after failing to comply with post-judgment discovery and stealing a mug from the courthouse. He was released on February 5, 2026.

== Education ==
Johnson attended Milton Academy high school on scholarship. He attended Claremont McKenna College from 2007 to 2011. At college he was awarded the Eric Breindel Collegiate Journalism Award and the Claremont Institute Publius Fellowship. In 2016, Johnson wrote a memo encouraging Claremont Institute alumni to help elect Donald Trump as president. In 2021, Johnson told Rolling Stone he had broken with his past and supported Joe Biden.

== Controversies ==
=== Peter Thiel ===
Johnson has had a long-standing relationship with Silicon Valley financier and Trump backer Peter Thiel, including collaboration on strategy against Gawker and work for the Trump campaign, as outlined in detail in the book The Contrarian.

Johnson both recruited and outed Thiel as a federal informant to Business Insider.

=== Bob Menendez ===
Johnson was involved in the creation of a Daily Caller story that accused U.S. Senator Bob Menendez (D-NJ) of soliciting underage prostitutes in the Dominican Republic. A criminal investigation of the case found no evidence, and the women making the allegations later admitted she had been paid by a local lawyer to make the claims.

=== Cory Booker ===
On October 14, 2013, Johnson published an article in The Daily Caller claiming that Newark mayor and then senatorial candidate Cory Booker never lived in Newark. The article cited neighbors of Booker's alleged address as evidence. Booker's campaign provided a reporter from BuzzFeed with rental checks and other documents for the address going back several years, and Booker's communications director dismissed Johnson's allegations as "laughable". According to Booker's campaign, he lived there from late 2006 to shortly before he was elected Senator in 2013. Johnson stood by his reporting, claiming that Booker may well have paid rent but did not live in Newark.

=== David D. Kirkpatrick ===
In January 2014, Johnson published an article reporting that The New York Times reporter David D. Kirkpatrick was arrested for exhibitionism and had previously posed for Playgirl. Johnson's source for the Playgirl claim was a January 22, 1990, article in The Daily Princetonian, which was later revealed to be satirical. Johnson apologized to Kirkpatrick.

=== Malaysia Airlines Flight 370 ===
Johnson told the ABC news affiliate in Fresno that he knew where Malaysia Airlines Flight 370 was. The airplane disappeared on March 8, 2014, while en route from Kuala Lumpur to Beijing. "I just need the funding to go there," he told news reporters.

=== 2014 Mississippi Republican primary election ===
On June 30, 2014, Johnson published a story on GotNews accusing Mississippi senator Thad Cochran of bribing African Americans to vote for him in the Mississippi Senate Republican primary. The story came days after Cochran had defeated Tea Party challenger Chris McDaniel in a run-off election. Johnson claimed that a black pastor named Stevie Fielder had told him he was paid by Cochran's campaign to bribe black Democrats into voting for Cochran. Johnson paid the pastor for his statements, a controversial practice sometimes known as "checkbook journalism". Fielder later partially recanted his story, saying that he had been speaking hypothetically, that he had turned down the offer, and that Johnson's recording of his interview had been selectively edited, a claim Johnson denies.

During the election, Johnson also accused the Cochran campaign of being responsible for Mississippi Tea Party leader Mark Mayfield's suicide and encouraged his Twitter followers to flood a Cochran campaign conference call.

=== Ferguson ===
During the Ferguson unrest in 2014, Johnson published the Instagram account of Michael Brown and stated that the account "shows a violent streak that may help explain what led to a violent confrontation with Police officer Darren Wilson". Johnson also filed a lawsuit to have Brown's juvenile records released. In Brown's home state of Missouri, the records of minors are private, but Johnson argued that the matter was of pressing public interest under the state's sunshine law. The county court disagreed. Further appeal attempts by Johnson to unseal the records went as far as the State Supreme Court of Missouri, which denied his request.

In a separate incident during the unrest, Johnson published the addresses of two The New York Times reporters, claiming that they published the known addresses of Darren Wilson. The New York Times has said the reporters only revealed the street on which Wilson once lived.

=== University of Virginia rape article ===
In December 2014, Rolling Stone columnist Sabrina Erdely published an article entitled "A Rape on Campus" about the alleged gang rape of a University of Virginia (UVA) student named "Jackie" in 2012 at the Phi Kappa Psi fraternity house at UVA. The article was later found to be fabricated. Johnson publicly identified Jackie, but in the selection of photos he used had the wrong photo of Jackie.

=== Banning from Twitter / X ===
On May 24, 2015, Johnson sent a tweet asking his followers for donations to help him "take out" Black Lives Matter activist DeRay Mckesson. McKesson shared the tweet and took the tweet as a threat. Johnson was permanently banned from Twitter after several users reported him for harassment. In 2018, Johnson sued Twitter for banning him on the grounds that Twitter violated his First Amendment right to free speech. The California Superior Court in Fresno struck down Johnson's lawsuit on June 6. In a December 31, 2024, post on his Substack, Johnson wrote a post explaining how he felt about being banned by Twitter (which by then became known as "X") for a third time. The alleged reason was for making a post related to Elon Musk’s family mining business.

=== Jeff Giesea ===
In 2014, Johnson met over Twitter with Jeff Giesea, Peter Thiel's former employee, who founded MAGA-X3 with Mike Cernovich who was involved in promoting the Pizzagate hoax. "When I met Chuck I wondered why we weren't weaponizing people like him," Giesea recounted. "He led me on this intellectual journey."

In 2017, Giesea wrote an article inspired by his association with Johnson titled "It's Time to Embrace Memetic Warfare," for the Defence Strategic Communications, an official journal of NATO's Stratcom. In the article, Giesea recommended the adoption of memetic warfare to combat ISIS. "The best way to counter ISIS is to unleash an army of trolls on them," Giesea recalls Johnson joking. "I could totally mess with their recruiting and propaganda." That conversation led Giesea to conclude: "Warfare through trolling and memes is a necessary, inexpensive, and easy way to help destroy the appeal and morale of our common enemies... Trolling, it might be said, is the social media equivalent of guerrilla warfare, and memes are its currency of propaganda."

Johnson broke with Jeff Giesea over Giesea's involvement with the January 6th United States Capitol attack.

=== Katie Walsh ===
In February 2017, Johnson's website GotNews.com claimed that White House Deputy Chief of Staff Katie Walsh was "the source behind a bunch of leaks" in the White House without offering any evidence.

=== Charlottesville Rally ===
In August 2017, Johnson's website GotNews was one of several right-wing websites that falsely accused a Michigan man of being responsible for the car attack on August 12, 2017, that killed one anti-racist protestor and injured others in Charlottesville, Virginia. The Michigan man was subsequently harassed, and was advised by police to flee his home following a slew of death threats. Together with his father, the Michigan man filed a defamation lawsuit against 22 corporate and individual defendants, including Johnson. On June 1, 2018, Johnson and GotNews agreed to pay a total of $29,900 to settle the lawsuit.

=== Trump campaign WikiLeaks liaison ===
In September 2016, Johnson published a story on GotNews about a soon-to-launch anti-Trump website called PutinTrump.org. WikiLeaks forwarded the story in private to Donald Trump Jr. before publicly tweeting it. Business Insider speculated that Johnson's story in September on GotNews may have marked the beginning of Donald Trump Jr.'s—and the Trump campaign's—back-channel contact with Julian Assange and Wikileaks. (Johnson wrote after Wikileaks tweeted the story, "About 2 hours after our original article, Julian Assange's WikiLeaks repeated our discoveries. Guess which big leaks organization reads GotNews & WeSearchr on the downlow! Come on Julian, let's work together. WikiLeaks & WeSearchr is a match made in heaven. We can take down Hillary together.") In August 2017, Johnson brokered and attended a meeting in London between GOP Rep. Dana Rohrabacher and Julian Assange to discuss a presidential pardon for Assange.

=== Fraudulent sexual harassment claim against Senator Charles Schumer ===
On December 11, 2017, Johnson wrote on his Facebook page, "Michael Cernovich & I are going to end the career of a U.S. Senator." Johnson claimed to have uncovered a sexual harassment lawsuit against Senator Charles Schumer. The lawsuit, however, turned out to be a forgery. Moreover, language in the forged lawsuit was copied verbatim from a real sexual-harassment complaint filed against Rep. John Conyers. Schumer referred the matter to Capitol police for investigation.

Johnson participated in the investigation.

=== Holocaust denial ===
In 2017, Johnson wrote in a Reddit Ask Me Anything thread: "I do not and never have believed the six million figure"—referring to the number of Jewish victims of the Holocaust—and "I agree with [Holocaust denier] David Cole about Auschwitz and the gas chambers not being real." When Representative Matt Gaetz brought Johnson to President Donald Trump's 2018 State of the Union address as a guest of Florida, the national director of the Anti-Defamation League cited those statements (along with the fundraising by Johnson's website WeSearchr of more than $150,000 for the legal defense of neo-Nazi propagandist Andrew Anglin) in calling on Gaetz to "discontinue any association with Johnson and to publicly repudiate his views immediately."

=== Sarah Unsicker ===
Missouri state representative Sarah Unsicker, a Democrat, was stripped of her committee assignments in 2023 after she repeatedly posted a photo on social media of herself posing with Johnson.

=== Point Bridge Capital Lawsuit ===
In October 2024 Semafor reported that Point Bridge Capital had filed a lawsuit against Johnson for civil racketeering. The lawsuit states that “Johnson is running a fraud and extortion scheme under which he [will] falsely present [himself] as intelligence agents or assets of U.S. government agencies. Johnson and Greenwill seek investments in upstart technology companies operating in the defense and intelligence sectors, which heavily rely on government contracts. If a company or investor doesn’t give in to their demands for equity or favorable investment terms, Johnson [will] threaten to sabotage the companies’ contracts or funding under the guise of their false claims to be government agents.” Johnson denied the validity of these claims, characterizing them as lawfare.

On July 29, 2025, Johnson was ordered to pay $71,000,000 in damages plus costs to the plaintiffs. On November 20, 2025, he was found to be in civil contempt of court, with the court ordering for his arrest for repeated failure to engage in post-judgment discovery in good faith, and a $1000 fine for theft of government property (a mug and water bottles) during his deposition.

Johnson appealed the decision to the Fifth Circuit Court of Appeals.

== Books ==
Johnson has written two books published through Encounter Books: Why Coolidge Matters, an essay collection encompassing various points in Calvin Coolidge's political career with blurbs by John Yoo, Michelle Malkin, and Ted Cruz, and The Truth About the IRS Scandals. Both books were published in 2013.

== Gawker lawsuit ==
In June 2015, Johnson sued Gawker for defamation in Missouri for $66 million for Gawker's publication of rumours that Johnson defecated on the floor while a student at Claremont McKenna College, and filed a similar suit in California in December. In January 2016, the Missouri suit was dismissed. Johnson settled with the by then-defunct Gawker in 2018.

== Work with Jeffrey Epstein and Steve Bannon ==
On October 18, 2021, more than two years after the death of Jeffrey Epstein, Johnson discussed his Breitbart boss and mentor Steve Bannon's relationship with the pedophile and human trafficker in an interview with Rolling Stone reporter Seth Hettena. Steve Bannon met with Epstein multiple times after exiting the White House, including in December 2017. This was while Johnson was being managed by Bannon at Breitbart. Johnson told Rolling Stone that Bannon viewed Epstein as both a rival and spy, and was deeply interested in emulating Jeffrey Epstein's operation. Bannon also offered to introduce Johnson to Epstein, and Johnson claims he declined but continued to work under Bannon at Breitbart. In addition, Johnson declared in the Rolling Stone piece that he quietly shifted his allegiance from Donald Trump to Joe Biden, likely after the presidential election or sometime in early 2021.

== Websites ==
Johnson was the founder of three websites, all of which are defunct:

- In early 2014, Johnson created GotNews, an alt-right news website. The site went offline with no advance warning on September 17, 2018. GotNews filed for bankruptcy in May 2019. The bankruptcy petition lists GotNews' total liabilities as between $500,000 and $1 million.
- In 2015, Johnson created WeSearchr, a crowdfunding website. By 2017, the site became a fundraising platform for alt-right causes, though Johnson claimed that was not his intention. Andrew Anglin, the founder of the neo-Nazi website The Daily Stormer, used the website to raise money to defend himself against a lawsuit brought by the American Civil Liberties Union (ACLU) on behalf of a woman trolled by followers of Anglin. In addition to crowdfunding legal battles, the site was also designed to crowdfund bounties on reporting goals. According to Johnson, he used the site to receive money for information he had already acquired. The site closed in May 2017.
- Johnson also started (along with photographer Peter Duke) the crowdfunding site Freestartr, which collected funds for white nationalist Richard B. Spencer's legal defense, far-right activist Tommy Robinson, Canadian nationalist Faith Goldy, Johnson himself, and others. In mid-2018, Freestartr stopped accepting funds, as the site was banned by Stripe and PayPal, which Freestartr used to process payments.

Until November 2025, Johnson wrote a Substack called "Charles Johnson’s Thoughts and Adventures."

== Clearview.AI ==
Johnson is a cofounder of Clearview AI, as reported by a 2021 New York Times Magazine article. He was bumped out of the nascent Clearview initially, but came to an agreement of holding a ten percent interest which would be as a silent partner as he would assist in marketing and wind-down his stake gradually.
