= Tor Ekeland =

American lawyer

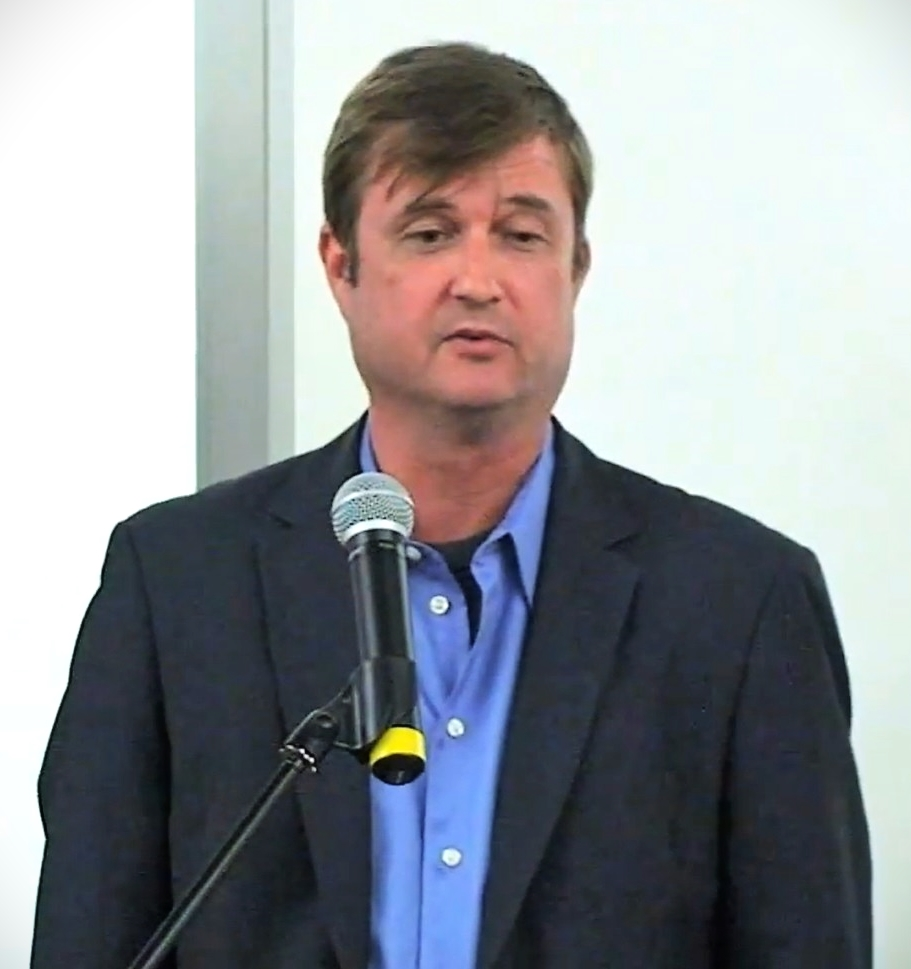
Ekeland at a benefit for Barrett Brown and Jeremy Hammond in 2013

Tor Bernhard Ekeland is a New York City based computer, trial and appellate lawyer. He is best known for representing hackers prosecuted under the Computer Fraud and Abuse Act ("CFAA") in federal criminal court and on appeal across the United States, and as a lawyer for Clearview AI.

== Biography ==
He graduated cum laude from Fordham University School of Law in 2006, where he served on the Fordham Law Review. After law school, he practiced complex commercial and securities litigation at Sidley Austin in New York City. He is the Managing Partner of Tor Ekeland Law, PLLC.

=== Notable representations ===
- Represented Andrew "weev" Auernheimer at trial and on Auernheimer's successful 2014 appeal to the Third Circuit Court of Appeals, both as co-counsel. Journalist Adam Penenberg described Ekeland as "the troll's lawyer".
- Part of team representing journalist Matthew Keys pro bono, who was charged with hacking when he gave Anonymous credentials to the Los Angeles Times website. Keys was found guilty.
- Co-counsel representing Anthony Conti at his LIBOR rate manipulation trial in the Southern District of New York, and on his successful appeal on fifth amendment grounds.
- Representing Fidel Salinas pro bono. Salinas was indicted on 44 federal felony counts of computer crime for his work with Anonymous, including 18 cyberstalking charges. Ekeland negotiated a plea deal for Salinas's original misdemeanor charge, unrelated to the Anonymous charges. An Electronic Frontier Foundation representative called the felony counts a "vindictive indictment" since Salinas refused to cooperate.
- Representing Justin Shafer, who was indicted on 6 federal felony counts of computer crime, and negotiating a single misdemeanor plea deal.
- Representing the U.K. hacker Lauri Love as his U.S. counsel. The United States Department of Justice indicted Love for felony CFAA violations in New York City, New Jersey, and Virginia. Alongside the Courage Foundation, Ekeland contributed to the successful fight to prevent Love's extradition from the U.K.
- Representing Deric Lostutter, the hacker and member of Anonymous, in his plea agreement for his indictment for hacking the fan website for the football team implicated in the Steubenville High School rape case.
- Representing the hacker Matt DeHart in his plea deal.
- Representing Keith Gartenlaub on his FISA search warrant appeal to the Ninth Circuit Court of Appeal as co-counsel alongside John D. Cline.
- Working for Clearview AI.
