= Cyrille Diabaté =

French kickboxer and mixed martial arts fighter

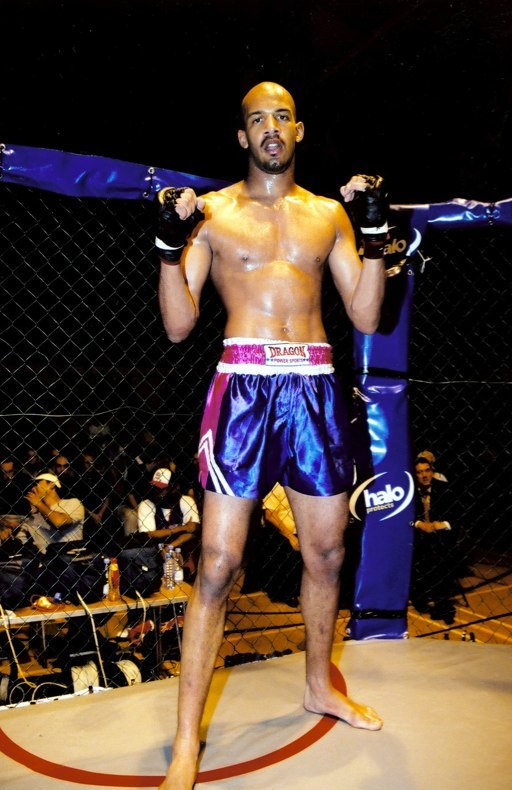
- Born: 6 October 1973 (age 53); La Celle-Saint-Cloud, France
- Other names: The Snake
- Nationality: French
- Height: 6 ft 6 in (1.98 m)
- Weight: 205 lb (93 kg; 14.6 st)
- Division: Heavyweight; Light Heavyweight; Middleweight
- Reach: 81 in (210 cm)
- Style: Kickboxing,Muay Thai,Savate,Shoot Boxing,Boxing,Sanda
- Stance: Southpaw
- Fighting out of: Rueil-Malmaison, France
- Team: Snake Team; Team Quest, AKA
- Years active: 1997–2014 (Kickboxing); 1999–2014 (MMA)

Kickboxing record
- Total: 51
- Wins: 41
- By knockout: 31
- Losses: 8
- Draws: 2

Mixed martial arts record
- Total: 30
- Wins: 19
- By knockout: 8
- By submission: 6
- By decision: 5
- Losses: 10
- By knockout: 2
- By submission: 5
- By decision: 3
- Draws: 1

Other information
- Mixed martial arts record from Sherdog
- Last updated on: October 17, 2010

Cyrille Moktar Diabaté (born October 6, 1973) is a retired French mixed martial artist and kickboxer. He has also competed in shoot boxing and Muay Thai. He has fought at Palace Fighting Championship, Tachi Palace Fights, PRIDE, ShoXC, Deep, Cage Rage and the Ultimate Fighting Championship.

== Mixed martial arts career ==
=== Pride Fighting Championships ===
Diabaté then faced off against Maurício Rua at Pride Final Conflict Absolute. After 5:29 of the first round, Rua defeated Diabaté via TKO (stomps). This loss led to Diabaté heading for smaller organizations.

His first fight was in England, for the Cage Rage promotion. He defeated Ryan Robinson via armbar and followed this up with a blood-soaked decision victory in a ShoXC card, where he faced Jaime Fletcher.

Diabaté defeated Marcus Hicks via submission (armbar) after just 89 seconds. This win was his fourth in a row and was followed up by a win over Rob Smith via submission.

=== Ultimate Fighting Championship ===
Cyrille appeared frequently as a striking coach for Team Henderson in season 9 of The Ultimate Fighter. It was announced in February 2010 that Diabaté had signed a four fight contract with the UFC.

In his debut at UFC 114 he defeated Luiz Cané via TKO in the first round. Diabaté later expressed disappointment in his own performance, having had to "survive a flash knockout" early in the first round.

In his second appearance, Diabaté lost to Alexander Gustafsson on October 16, 2010, at UFC 120. In the fight, he was dominated by the Swede for the entire first round standing, and in the second round he was taken down early and submitted with a rear naked choke. This was his first loss in four years.

For his third UFC fight, Diabaté faced Steve Cantwell on March 3, 2011, at UFC Live: Sanchez vs. Kampmann. He won the fight via unanimous decision.

Diabaté fought Anthony Perosh on November 5, 2011, at UFC 138. He lost the bout against Perosh via submission due to a rear naked choke in the second round.

Diabaté was expected to face Jörgen Kruth on April 14, 2012, at UFC on Fuel TV 2. However, Kruth was forced out of the bout with an injury and replaced by Tom DeBlass. Diabaté won the fight via majority decision.

Diabaté was briefly linked to a bout with Fabio Maldonado on November 17, 2012, at UFC 154. However, Maldonado was pulled from the bout and faced Glover Teixeira on October 13, 2012, at UFC 153, replacing an injured Quinton Jackson. Diabaté instead faced Chad Griggs at the event. Diabate defeated Griggs via first round rear naked choke submission.

Diabaté faced Jimi Manuwa on February 16, 2013, at UFC on Fuel TV: Barão vs. McDonald. Manuwa was declared the winner (TKO) after Diabaté was unable to continue after tearing a calf muscle near the end of the first round.

Diabaté faced Ilir Latifi at UFC Fight Night 37. Before the fight, Diabaté announced he will retire from MMA regardless of the bout's outcome. He lost the fight via submission in the first round. After his loss to Latifi, Diabaté made his retirement from combat sports official.

== Kickboxing record (Incomplete) ==
Kickboxing record
41 wins (31 KOs), 8 losses, 2 draws
Date	Result	Opponent	Event	Location	Method	Round	Time
21 May 2005	Win	(England) Michael Bisping	CWFC: Strike Force 1	Coventry, West Midlands, England	Decision (Unanimous)	4	3:00
19 March 2005	Loss	(Russia) Aleksandr Pitchkounov	Ichigeki Paris 2005	Paris, France	Decision (Unanimous)	5	3:00
11 April 2004	Loss	(Belarus) Alexey Ignashov	MT ONE	Saint-Pierre, Réunion	Decision	5	3:00
20 August 2003	Loss	(Switzerland) Petar Majstorović	K-1 Spain Grand Prix 2003 in Barcelona	Barcelona, Spain	Decision (Unanimous)	3	3:00
20 August 2003	Win	(Spain) Damián García	K-1 Spain Grand Prix 2003 in Barcelona	Barcelona, Spain	KO (Strikes)	1	N/A
1 February 2002	Win	(England) Lee Hasdell	Shoot Boxing: S Volume 1	Tokyo, Japan	TKO (Doctor Stoppage)	4	2:18
18 March 2000	Win	(United States) Rick Roufus	I.S.K.A. Championship	Las Vegas, Nevada, United States	TKO (Doctor Stoppage)	3	3:00
Legend: Win Loss Draw/No contest

== Mixed martial arts record ==
Professional record breakdown
30 matches	19 wins	10 losses
By knockout	8	2
By submission	6	5
By decision	5	3
Draws	1	

Res.	Record	Opponent	Method	Event	Date	Round	Time	Location	Notes
Loss	19–10–1	Ilir Latifi	Submission (ninja choke)	UFC Fight Night: Gustafsson vs. Manuwa	March 8, 2014	1	3:02	London, England	
Loss	19–9–1	Jimi Manuwa	TKO (retirement)	UFC on Fuel TV: Barão vs. McDonald	February 16, 2013	1	5:00	London, England	
Win	19–8–1	Chad Griggs	Submission (rear-naked choke)	UFC 154	November 17, 2012	1	2:24	Montreal, Quebec, Canada	
Win	18–8–1	Tom DeBlass	Decision (majority)	UFC on Fuel TV: Gustafsson vs. Silva	April 14, 2012	3	5:00	Stockholm, Sweden	
Loss	17–8–1	Anthony Perosh	Submission (rear-naked choke)	UFC 138	November 5, 2011	2	3:09	Birmingham, England	
Win	17–7–1	Steve Cantwell	Decision (unanimous)	UFC Live: Sanchez vs. Kampmann	March 3, 2011	3	5:00	Louisville, Kentucky, United States	
Loss	16–7–1	Alexander Gustafsson	Submission (rear-naked choke)	UFC 120	October 16, 2010	2	2:41	London, England	
Win	16–6–1	Luiz Cané	TKO (punches)	UFC 114	May 29, 2010	1	2:13	Las Vegas, Nevada, United States	
Win	15–6–1	Rob Smith	Submission (rear-naked choke)	TPF 2: Brawl in the Hall	December 3, 2009	1	1:47	Lemoore, California, United States	
Win	14–6–1	Marcus Hicks	Submission (armbar)	AMMA 1: First Blood	October 24, 2009	1	1:29	Edmonton, Alberta, Canada	
Win	13–6–1	Lodune Sincaid	TKO (doctor stoppage)	PFC 12: High Stakes	January 22, 2009	2	1:15	Lemoore, California, United States	
Win	12–6–1	Jaime Fletcher	Decision (unanimous)	ShoXC: Hamman vs. Suganuma 2	August 15, 2008	3	5:00	Friant, California, United States	
Win	11–6–1	Ryan Robinson	Submission (armbar)	Cage Rage 21	April 21, 2007	1	1:15	London, England	
Loss	10–6–1	Maurício Rua	TKO (stomps)	Pride FC - Final Conflict Absolute	September 10, 2006	1	5:29	Saitama, Japan	
Win	10–5–1	Yasuhito Namekawa	KO (flying knee)	Real Rhythm: 4th Stage	July 30, 2006	2	1:50	Osaka, Japan	
Win	9–5–1	Yasuhito Namekawa	KO (punches)	Deep: 24 Impact	April 11, 2006	2	2:22	Tokyo, Japan	
Win	8–5–1	Takahiro Oba	Submission (rear-naked choke)	Real Rhythm: 3rd Stage	March 4, 2006	2	3:47	Osaka, Japan	
Win	7–5–1	Mu Jin-Na	KO (head kick and punches)	Real Rhythm: 2nd Stage	November 19, 2005	1	1:28	Osaka, Japan	
Loss	6–5–1	Fábio Piamonte	Submission (arm-triangle choke)	Cage Rage 12	July 2, 2005	1	2:09	London, England	
Loss	6–4–1	Renato Sobral	Submission (guillotine choke)	Cage Rage 9	November 27, 2004	1	3:38	London, England	Return to Light Heavyweight.
Loss	6–3–1	Arman Gambaryan	Decision (unanimous)	M-1 MFC: Middleweight GP	October 9, 2004	3	5:00	St. Petersburg, Russia	Middleweight debut.
Loss	6–2–1	Rodney Glunder	Decision (unanimous)	2 Hot 2 Handle	February 22, 2004	2	3:00	Amsterdam, Netherlands	Light Heavyweight debut.
Win	6–1–1	James Žikic	Decision (unanimous)	EF 1: Genesis	July 13, 2003	3	5:00	London, England	
Win	5–1–1	Dave Vader	Submission (triangle choke)	2H2H 6: Simply the Best 6	March 16, 2003	1	3:40	Rotterdam, Netherlands	
Win	4–1–1	Bob Schrijber	Decision	2H2H 5: Simply the Best 5	October 13, 2002	2	3:00	Rotterdam, Netherlands	
Win	3–1–1	Matt Frye	KO (punches)	Cage Wars 2	May 15, 2002	1	N/A	London, England	
Loss	2–1–1	Josh Dempsey	Decision	Cage Wars 1	February 23, 2002	2	N/A	Portsmouth, England	
Draw	2–0–1	Rodney Glunder	Draw	Rings Holland: No Guts, No Glory	June 10, 2001	2	5:00	Amsterdam, Netherlands	
Win	2–0	Andre Juskevicius	KO (punches)	Golden Trophy 2000	March 18, 2000	1	0:49	Orléans, France	
Win	1–0	Ryuta Sakurai	TKO (punches)	Golden Trophy 1999	March 20, 1999	2	N/A	France	
