= UFC 154 =

UFC mixed martial arts event in 2012

UFC 154: St-Pierre vs. Condit
- The poster for UFC 154: St-Pierre vs. Condit
- Promotion: Ultimate Fighting Championship
- Date: November 17, 2012
- Venue: Bell Centre
- City: Montreal, Quebec, Canada
- Attendance: 17,249
- Total gate: $3,143,000
- Buyrate: 700,000

Event chronology
UFC on Fuel TV: Franklin vs. Le	UFC 154: St-Pierre vs. Condit	UFC on Fox: Henderson vs. Diaz

UFC 154: St-Pierre vs. Condit was a mixed martial arts pay-per-view event held by the Ultimate Fighting Championship on November 17, 2012, at the Bell Centre in Montreal, Quebec, Canada.

== Background ==
Parent company Zuffa, LLC produced a UFC Primetime special to promote the title unification match main event. In addition, UFC 154 was shown in more than 350 movie theaters in the United States.

Fabio Maldonado was briefly linked to a bout with Cyrille Diabaté at the event. However, Maldonado was moved to UFC 153 to face Glover Teixeira.Chad Griggs ended up replacing Maldonado to face Diabaté.

Stephen Thompson was expected to face Besam Yousef at the event. However, Thompson was forced out of the bout with a knee injury and was replaced by Matthew Riddle. Yousef was then forced out with injury, and replaced by John Maguire.

A bout between Nick Ring and Costas Philippou was expected to take place at this event. However, the fight was scrapped when Ring fell ill the day of the fight. As a result, Mark Bocek and Rafael Dos Anjos was moved to the main card.

== Results ==
Main Card
Weight class				Method	Round	Time	Notes
Welterweight	Georges St-Pierre (c)	def.	Carlos Condit (ic)	Decision (unanimous) (49–46, 50–45, 50–45)	5	5:00	(Note: UFC Welterweight Championship unification bout.)
Welterweight	Johny Hendricks	def.	Martin Kampmann	KO (punch)	1	0:46
Middleweight	Francis Carmont	def.	Tom Lawlor	Decision (split) (28–29, 29–28, 29–28)	3	5:00
Lightweight	Rafael dos Anjos	def.	Mark Bocek	Decision (unanimous) (30–27, 30–27, 30–27)	3	5:00
Featherweight	Pablo Garza	def.	Mark Hominick	Decision (unanimous) (29–27, 29–28, 30–26)	3	5:00
Preliminary Card (FX)
Middleweight	Patrick Côté	def.	Alessio Sakara	DQ (punches to the back of the head)	1	1:26
Light Heavyweight	Cyrille Diabaté	def.	Chad Griggs	Submission (rear-naked choke)	1	2:24
Lightweight	John Makdessi	def.	Sam Stout	Decision (unanimous) (30–27, 29–28, 30–27)	3	5:00
Featherweight	Antonio Carvalho	def.	Rodrigo Damm	Decision (split) (28–29, 29–28, 29–28)	3	5:00
Preliminary Card (Facebook and YouTube)
Welterweight	Matthew Riddle	def.	John Maguire	Decision (unanimous) (30–27, 30–27, 29–28)	3	5:00
Bantamweight	Ivan Menjivar	def.	Azamat Gashimov	Submission (armbar)	1	2:44
Featherweight	Darren Elkins	def.	Steven Siler	Decision (unanimous) (30–27, 30–27, 30–27)	3	5:00

== Bonus awards ==
The following fighters received $70,000 bonuses:

- Fight of the Night: Georges St. Pierre vs. Carlos Condit
- Knockout of the Night: Johny Hendricks
- Submission of the Night: Ivan Menjivar

== See also ==
- List of UFC events
- 2012 in UFC
