= UFC on Fuel TV: Franklin vs. Le =

UFC mixed martial arts event in 2012

- The poster for UFC on Fuel TV: Franklin vs. Le
- Promotion: Ultimate Fighting Championship
- Date: November 10, 2012
- Venue: CotaiArena
- City: Macau, SAR, China
- Attendance: 8,415
- Total gate: $1,300,000

Event chronology
UFC 153: Silva vs. Bonnar	UFC on Fuel TV: Franklin vs. Le	UFC 154: St-Pierre vs. Condit

UFC on Fuel TV: Franklin vs. Le (also known as UFC on Fuel TV 6) was a mixed martial arts event held by the Ultimate Fighting Championship on November 10, 2012, at the Macau, SAR, China. It was the first UFC event held in China.

== Background ==
As a result of the cancellation of UFC 151, bouts between Takeya Mizugaki vs. Jeff Hougland and John Lineker vs. Yasuhiro Urushitani were rescheduled for this event.

Marcelo Guimarães was expected to face Hyun Gyu Lim at the event; however, Guimarães was forced out of the bout with an injury and replaced by David Mitchell. Lim was then pulled from the bout by doctors and the fight was subsequently cancelled.

Kyung Ho Kang was expected to face Alex Caceres at this event; however, Kang was forced out of the bout with an injury and was replaced by promotional newcomer Motonobu Tezuka.

== Results ==
Main Card (Fuel TV)
Weight class				Method	Round	Time	Notes
Middleweight	Cung Le	def.	Rich Franklin	KO (punch)	1	2:17
Light Heavyweight	Thiago Silva	vs.	Stanislav Nedkov	NC (overturned)	3	1:45	(Note: Originally ruled a Submission (arm-triangle choke) victory for Silva, result was overturned due to testing positive for a banned substance.)
Welterweight	Dong Hyun Kim	def.	Paulo Thiago	Decision (unanimous) (30–26, 30–27, 30–27)	3	5:00
Lightweight	Takanori Gomi	def.	Mac Danzig	Decision (split) (28–29, 29–28, 29–28)	3	5:00
Lightweight	Jon Tuck	def.	Zhang Tiequan	Decision (unanimous) (29–28, 30–27, 29–28)	3	5:00
Bantamweight	Takeya Mizugaki	def.	Jeff Hougland	Decision (unanimous) (30–25, 30–27, 30–27)	3	5:00
Preliminary Card (Facebook)
Bantamweight	Alex Caceres	def.	Motonobu Tezuka	Decision (split) (28–29, 30–27, 30–27)	3	5:00
Flyweight	John Lineker	def.	Yasuhiro Urushitani	Decision (unanimous) (29–28, 30–27, 29–28)	3	5:00
Middleweight	Riki Fukuda	def.	Tom DeBlass	Decision (unanimous) (30–27, 29–28, 29–28)	3	5:00

== Bonus awards ==
The following fighters received $40,000 bonuses.

- Fight of the Night: Takanori Gomi vs. Mac Danzig
- Knockout of the Night: Cung Le
- Submission of the Night: Thiago Silva

== See also ==
- List of UFC events
- 2012 in UFC
