= UFC Primetime =

UFC television series

- Genre: Reality, Sports
- Created by: Frank Fertitta III, Lorenzo Fertitta, Dana White
- Starring: various MMA fighters
- Country of origin: United States

Production
- Running time: 30 minutes

Original release
- Network: Spike (2009–2011); FX (2012–2013)
- Release: January 14, 2009 – November 9, 2013

UFC Primetime is a television series that aired on Spike and FX in the United States. The show chronicles the training regimens of two UFC fighters prior to their next upcoming main event bout.

== Premise ==
Each season consists of three episodes with 30-minute running times (including commercials) that showcase opposing UFC mixed martial artists in their training camps as they make final preparations in getting ready—both mentally and physically—leading up to their big match.

UFC Primetime has drawn comparisons to HBO Sport's 24/7 highly acclaimed TV series, which shows the preparations of two boxers before a big event.

== List of seasons ==
No.	Title	Event	Bout	Originally aired
1	UFC Primetime: St-Pierre vs. Penn	UFC 94	Georges St-Pierre vs. B.J. Penn 2	January 14–28, 2009
2	UFC Primetime: St-Pierre vs. Hardy	UFC 111	Georges St-Pierre vs. Dan Hardy	March 10–24, 2010
3	UFC Primetime: Jackson vs. Evans	UFC 114	Quinton Jackson vs. Rashad Evans	May 12–26, 2010
4	UFC Primetime: Lesnar vs. Velasquez	UFC 121	Brock Lesnar vs. Cain Velasquez	October 6–20, 2010
5	UFC Primetime: St-Pierre vs. Shields	UFC 129	Georges St-Pierre vs. Jake Shields	April 13–28, 2011
6	UFC Primetime: Velasquez vs. Dos Santos	UFC on Fox 1	Cain Velasquez vs. Junior dos Santos	October 30, 2011 (one-hour special)
7	UFC Primetime: Diaz vs. Condit	UFC 143	Nick Diaz vs. Carlos Condit	January 20–February 3, 2012
8	UFC Primetime: Jones vs. Evans	UFC 145	Jon Jones vs. Rashad Evans	April 6–20, 2012
9	UFC Primetime: Dos Santos vs. Mir	UFC 146	Junior dos Santos vs. Frank Mir	May 11–25, 2012
10	UFC Primetime: Silva vs. Sonnen	UFC 148	Anderson Silva vs. Chael Sonnen 2	June 30, 2012
11	UFC Primetime: St-Pierre vs. Condit	UFC 154	Georges St-Pierre vs. Carlos Condit	November 6–16, 2012
12	UFC Primetime: Rousey vs. Carmouche	UFC 157	Ronda Rousey vs. Liz Carmouche	February 7–20, 2013
13	UFC Primetime: Velasquez vs. dos Santos 3	UFC 166	Cain Velasquez vs. Junior dos Santos	October 2–16, 2013
14	UFC Primetime: St-Pierre vs. Hendricks	UFC 167	Georges St-Pierre vs. Johny Hendricks	November 1–9, 2013

== TV Ratings ==
An industry source told MMAjunkie ESPN2 scored 144,000 viewers for the 11 p.m. replay and 105,000 viewers for the 11:30 p.m. airing. The debut episode of "UFC Primetime" scored 610,000 viewers on Spike TV. In addition to ESPN2, replays have aired on ION Television, Fuel TV and Versus.
