= Travis Browne =

American mixed martial artist (born 1982)

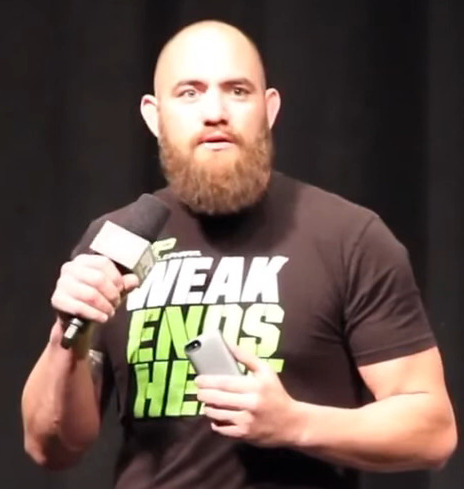
- Browne in 2012.
- Born: Travis Kuualiialoha Browne; July 17, 1982 (age 44); Honolulu, Hawaii, U.S.
- Other names: Hapa
- Height: 6 ft 7 in (201 cm)
- Weight: 244 lb (111 kg; 17 st 6 lb)
- Division: Heavyweight
- Reach: 79 in (201 cm)
- Fighting out of: Albuquerque, New Mexico, U.S.
- Team: Alliance MMA; Glendale Fight Club (May 2013–present)
- Rank: Black belt in Brazilian Jiu-Jitsu
- Years active: 2009–2017(MMA)

Mixed martial arts record
- Total: 26
- Wins: 18
- By knockout: 14
- By submission: 2
- By decision: 2
- Losses: 7
- By knockout: 4
- By submission: 1
- By decision: 2
- Draws: 1

Amateur Muay Thai record
- Total: 2
- Wins: 2
- By knockout: 2

Other information
- Spouse: Erin Browne (m. 2001; div. 2009) Jenna Renee Webb (m. 2015; div. 2016) Ronda Rousey (m. 2017)
- Children: 4
- Mixed martial arts record from Sherdog

Travis Kuualiialoha Browne (born July 17, 1982) is an American retired mixed martial artist who last competed as a Heavyweight in the Ultimate Fighting Championship (UFC).

== Background ==
Browne was born in Hawaii to a father with Native Hawaiian ancestry and a European American mother. He played basketball and won the 2000 Coastal North League Player of the Year while attending high school in San Diego and then continued his career at Palomar College. Browne had no martial arts experience before being introduced to Brazilian jiu-jitsu at the age of 26. Browne also began training in boxing and had his first professional fight less than a year later.

== Mixed martial arts career ==
Browne began his professional MMA career in 2009, fighting in smaller organizations such as Bellator Fighting Championships, Gladiator Challenge, and King of the Cage. He quickly amassed an undefeated winning streak of 9–0.

=== Ultimate Fighting Championship ===
In March 2010, Browne signed with the UFC. He made his debut at The Ultimate Fighter: Team Liddell vs. Team Ortiz Finale against James McSweeney. Browne won the fight via TKO at 4:32 of the first round.

Browne fought UFC veteran Cheick Kongo at UFC 120. The fight was even heading into the third round, with Browne winning the first round on the judge's scorecards and Kongo taking the second. In the third and final round, Kongo was penalized with a point deduction for repeatedly grabbing and holding Browne's shorts and the fight, therefore, resulted in a somewhat controversial draw.

Browne faced Stefan Struve on May 28, 2011, at UFC 130. He won the fight via superman punch KO in the first round, earning a "Knockout of the Night" bonus in the process.

Browne faced Rob Broughton on September 24, 2011, at UFC 135 where he won by unanimous decision (30–27, 30–27, and 30–27).

Browne agreed to fight UFC newcomer Chad Griggs on April 21, 2012, at UFC 145. He defeated Griggs by submission due to an arm-triangle choke in the first round. The performance earned Browne Submission of the Night honors.

Browne was expected to fight Ben Rothwell at UFC on FOX 4 on August 4, 2012, in Los Angeles, California. However, Rothwell was forced to pull out of the fight due to injury.

Browne faced Antônio Silva on October 5, 2012, at the main event of UFC on FX 5. Browne came out aggressive, showing a variety of striking techniques. Browne strained his left hamstring throwing a flashy kick. Silva was able to capitalize, backing Browne up, landing a big right hand, and finishing with punches from the top, giving Browne his first professional loss. A camera crew from Vice Media followed and interviewed Browne before and after the fight with Silva.

Browne faced Gabriel Gonzaga on April 13, 2013, at The Ultimate Fighter 17 Finale. Browne defeated Gonzaga via first-round knockout by elbows to the side of the head. The performance earned Browne Knockout of the Night honors. The win however was not without controversy as Browne not only held on to the fence to defend a takedown but also connected with illegal 12–6 elbows to the back of the head to Gonzaga. Gonzaga's appeal to the Nevada State Athletic Commission to overturn the fight to a no-contest was denied.

Browne faced Alistair Overeem on August 17, 2013, at UFC Fight Night 26. After surviving Overeem's initial flurry, Browne won via knockout due to a front kick and punches in the first round. The impressive knockout also earned Browne his third Knockout of the Night bonus award.

Browne faced Josh Barnett on December 28, 2013, at UFC 168. Browne won exactly a minute into the match via knockout due to elbows while Barnett was attempting a takedown. This earned him the Knockout of the Night bonus for his third straight fight.

Browne faced Fabrício Werdum on April 19, 2014, at UFC on Fox 11. Despite being a betting favorite with better considered striking, Browne was outstruck for nearly all five rounds after scoring an early knockdown on Werdum in the first round. Browne also said that he suffered a broken hand, ribs and dislocated his foot at some point during the fight. He lost the fight via unanimous decision (49–46, 50–45, and 50–45).

Browne faced Brendan Schaub on December 6, 2014, at UFC 181. He won the fight via TKO in the first round.

Browne faced Andrei Arlovski on May 23, 2015, at UFC 187. Despite being a heavy betting favorite, Browne lost the fight via TKO in the first round. After a back and forth round where both fighters were dropped, many instantly consider it one of the best one round fights in UFC history. The bout earned Browne his first Fight of the Night bonus award.

Browne faced Matt Mitrione on January 17, 2016, at UFC Fight Night 81. He won the fight via TKO in the third round. However, this win was controversial, as Mitrione suffered multiple eye pokes from Browne throughout the fight, with Browne even targeting the eye with jabs and punches, causing Mitrione to have an injured eye.

Browne next faced Cain Velasquez on July 9, 2016, at UFC 200. He lost the fight via TKO in the closing seconds of the first round.

Browne faced Fabrício Werdum in a rematch on September 10, 2016, at UFC 203. He lost the fight by unanimous decision (29–28, 29–27, and 30–27).

Browne faced Derrick Lewis on February 19, 2017, in the main event at UFC Fight Night 105 in Halifax, Nova Scotia. Despite hurting Lewis with body strikes in the first round, he lost the fight via knockout in the second round. Both participants were awarded Fight of the Night for their performance.

Browne faced Alexey Oleynik on July 8, 2017, at UFC 213. He lost the fight via submission in the second round. This result prompted UFC president Dana White to say "I think that Travis should retire." It was his last fight to date.

== Personal life ==
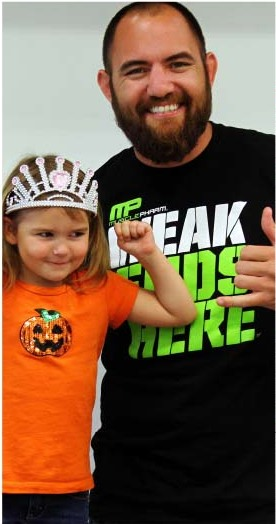
Browne posing with a young fan in 2013

Browne has two sons from his first marriage to Erin – Kaleo and Keawe. Browne married Jenna Renee Webb in January 2015. In July 2015, Webb posted Instagram photos showing multiple bruises on her body allegedly caused by Browne and claimed he beat her. As a result, Browne was removed from the UFC's International Fight Week events pending an investigation. On August 28, 2015, the UFC reinstated Browne when their independent investigation found "inconclusive evidence" in the domestic violence inquiry. Following the report, Webb publicly stated she is considering pressing charges. Browne and Webb divorced on February 21, 2016.

Since 2015, Travis Browne has maintained a relationship with former Women's Bantamweight champion Ronda Rousey. On April 20, 2017, Browne and Rousey announced their engagement. Browne proposed to Rousey under a waterfall in New Zealand. The two were married on August 26, 2017, in Hawaii., On April 21, 2021, Browne and Rousey announced on her official YouTube channel that she was four months pregnant. On June 29, 2021, Browne and Rousey announced that they were expecting a girl. On September 27, 2021, Rousey and Browne announced the birth of their daughter La'akea Makalapuaokalanipō Browne. On July 25, 2024, his wife Ronda Rousey announced that they are expecting their second child. On January 9, 2025, Rousey and Brown announced the birth of their second daughter Liko’ula Pā’ūomahinakaipiha Browne.

Browne's moniker, 'Hapa', is derived from the term in Hawaii for a person who is mixed blood.

Browne attended the 2019 WWE Hall Of Fame ceremony with his wife, Ronda Rousey, who was working with WWE. During the event, a fan rushed the stage and tackled Bret Hart, who was being inducted as a member of the tag team The Hart Foundation. Browne was one of several men who ran onto the stage to help subdue the man. Hart later thanked Browne the next night during WrestleMania 35.

== Championships and accomplishments ==
- Ultimate Fighting Championship
  - Fight of the Night (Two times) vs. Andrei Arlovski and Derrick Lewis
  - Knockout of the Night (Four times) vs. Stefan Struve, Gabriel Gonzaga, Alistair Overeem and Josh Barnett
  - Submission of the Night (One time) vs. Chad Griggs
  - Tied (Mark Hunt & Tom Aspinall) for fourth most Post-Fight bonuses in UFC Heavyweight division history (7)
  - UFC.com Awards
    - 2013: Ranked #5 Fighter of the Year
    - 2015: Half-Year Awards: Best Fight of the 1HY vs. Andrei Arlovski & Ranked #4 Fight of the Year vs. Andrei Arlovski
- Gladiator Challenge
  - Interim Gladiator Challenge Heavyweight Championship (One time)
- Victory Fighting Championship
  - VFC Heavyweight Championship (One time)
- World MMA Awards
  - 2013 Breakthrough Fighter of the Year
  - 2013 Comeback of the Year vs. Alistair Overeem at UFC Fight Night: Shogun vs. Sonnen
- MMA Junkie
  - 2013 Breakthrough Fighter of the Year
  - 2015 May Fight of the Month vs. Andrei Arlovski
- Bloody Elbow
  - 2013 Comeback of the Year vs. Alistair Overeem at UFC Fight Night: Shogun vs. Sonnen
- Bleacher Report
  - 2013 #7 Ranked Fighter of the Year
- Yahoo Sports
  - 2013 Comeback Fight of the Year vs. Alistair Overeem at UFC Fight Night: Shogun vs. Sonnen

== Mixed martial arts record ==
Professional record breakdown
26 matches	18 wins	7 losses
By knockout	14	4
By submission	2	1
By decision	2	2
Draws	1	

Res.	Record	Opponent	Method	Event	Date	Round	Time	Location	Notes
Loss	18–7–1	Aleksei Oleinik	Submission (rear-naked choke)	UFC 213	July 8, 2017	2	3:44	Las Vegas, Nevada, United States	
Loss	18–6–1	Derrick Lewis	KO (punches)	UFC Fight Night: Lewis vs. Browne	February 19, 2017	2	3:12	Halifax, Nova Scotia, Canada	Fight of the Night.
Loss	18–5–1	Fabrício Werdum	Decision (unanimous)	UFC 203	September 10, 2016	3	5:00	Cleveland, Ohio, United States	
Loss	18–4–1	Cain Velasquez	TKO (punches)	UFC 200	July 9, 2016	1	4:57	Las Vegas, Nevada, United States	
Win	18–3–1	Matt Mitrione	TKO (punches)	UFC Fight Night: Dillashaw vs. Cruz	January 17, 2016	3	4:09	Boston, Massachusetts, United States	
Loss	17–3–1	Andrei Arlovski	TKO (punches)	UFC 187	May 23, 2015	1	4:41	Las Vegas, Nevada, United States	Fight of the Night.
Win	17–2–1	Brendan Schaub	TKO (punches)	UFC 181	December 6, 2014	1	4:50	Las Vegas, Nevada, United States	
Loss	16–2–1	Fabrício Werdum	Decision (unanimous)	UFC on Fox: Werdum vs. Browne	April 19, 2014	5	5:00	Orlando, Florida, United States	UFC Heavyweight title eliminator.
Win	16–1–1	Josh Barnett	KO (elbows)	UFC 168	December 28, 2013	1	1:00	Las Vegas, Nevada, United States	Knockout of the Night.
Win	15–1–1	Alistair Overeem	KO (front kick and punches)	UFC Fight Night: Shogun vs. Sonnen	August 17, 2013	1	4:08	Boston, Massachusetts, United States	Knockout of the Night.
Win	14–1–1	Gabriel Gonzaga	KO (elbows)	The Ultimate Fighter: Team Jones vs. Team Sonnen Finale	April 13, 2013	1	1:11	Las Vegas, Nevada, United States	Knockout of the Night.
Loss	13–1–1	Antônio Silva	TKO (punches)	UFC on FX: Browne vs. Bigfoot	October 5, 2012	1	3:27	Minneapolis, Minnesota, United States	
Win	13–0–1	Chad Griggs	Submission (arm-triangle choke)	UFC 145	April 21, 2012	1	2:29	Atlanta, Georgia, United States	Submission of the Night.
Win	12–0–1	Rob Broughton	Decision (unanimous)	UFC 135	September 24, 2011	3	5:00	Denver, Colorado, United States	
Win	11–0–1	Stefan Struve	KO (punch)	UFC 130	May 28, 2011	1	4:11	Las Vegas, Nevada, United States	Knockout of the Night.
Draw	10–0–1	Cheick Kongo	Draw (unanimous)	UFC 120	October 16, 2010	3	5:00	London, England	Kongo was deducted 1 point in round 3 for holding onto Browne's shorts.
Win	10–0	James McSweeney	TKO (punches)	The Ultimate Fighter: Team Liddell vs. Team Ortiz Finale	June 19, 2010	1	4:32	Las Vegas, Nevada, United States	
Win	9–0	Aaron Brink	KO (punches)	Gladiator Challenge 111	February 21, 2010	1	0:35	San Jacinto, California, United States	Won the interim Gladiator Challenge Heavyweight Championship.
Win	8–0	Abe Wagner	TKO (punches)	VFC 30 – Night of Champions	February 5, 2010	1	0:10	Council Bluffs, Iowa, United States	Won the VFC Heavyweight Championship.
Win	7–0	Brian Campbell	KO (head kick)	Gladiator Challenge 107	November 8, 2009	1	0:10	San Jacinto, California, United States	
Win	6–0	Matt Anderson	TKO (punches)	Gladiator Challenge 98	July 23, 2009	2	0:49	San Jacinto, California, United States	
Win	5–0	Mychal Clark	Decision (unanimous)	Bellator 10	June 5, 2009	3	5:00	Ontario, California, United States	
Win	4–0	Sergio Calderon	KO (punches)	Gladiator Challenge 93	April 23, 2009	1	1:53	Pauma Valley, California, United States	
Win	3–0	Tom Lozano	Submission (armbar)	EF 9 – Espartan Fighting 9	March 14, 2009	1	0:55	Puerto Escondido, Mexico	
Win	2–0	Michael Westbrook	TKO (knee injury)	KOTC: Immortal	February 27, 2009	3	1:22	San Bernardino, California, United States	
Win	1–0	Evan Langford	TKO (punches)	Cage of Fire 15	February 7, 2009	1	0:43	Tijuana, Mexico	

== See also ==
- List of current UFC fighters
- List of male mixed martial artists
