= Fábio Maldonado =

Brazilian mixed martial artist

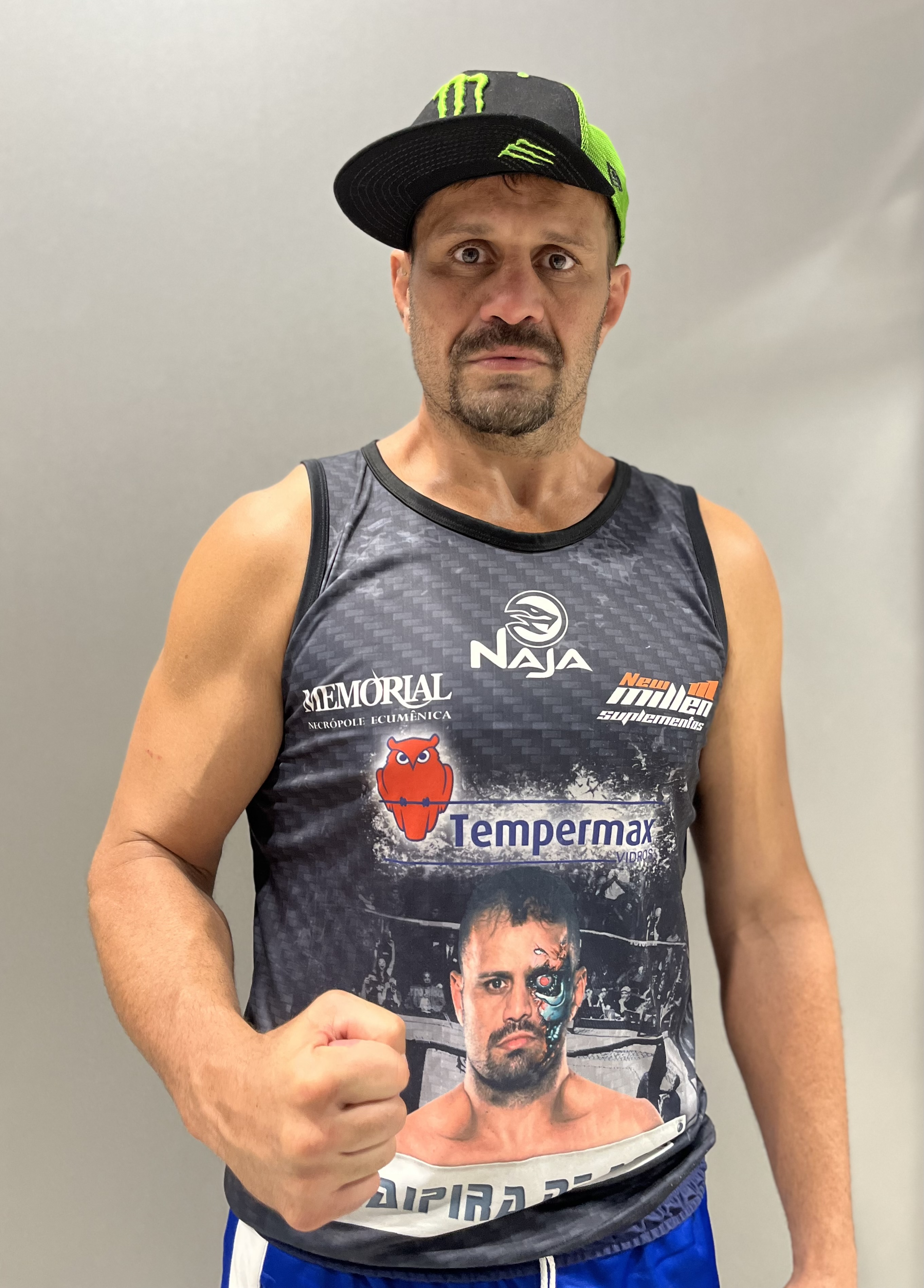
- Born: 17 March 1980 (age 46); Sorocaba, São Paulo, Brazil
- Other names: Caipira de Aço (The Steel Caipira)
- Height: 6 ft 1 in (1.85 m)
- Weight: 218 lb (99 kg; 15 st 8 lb)
- Division: Heavyweight; Cruiserweight (Boxing); Light Heavyweight (MMA)
- Reach: 75 in (190 cm)
- Style: Boxing
- Fighting out of: Florianópolis, Brazil; Miami, Florida, United States
- Team: Team Tavares; Team Nogueira (2004–2013); Pitbull Brothers (2013–present); American Top Team
- Rank: Black belt in Brazilian Jiu-Jitsu under Emerson Guego
- Years active: 2000–present (MMA); 2002–2010, 2016–present (Boxing)

Professional boxing record
- Total: 41
- Wins: 30
- By knockout: 29
- Losses: 11
- By knockout: 6

Mixed martial arts record
- Total: 47
- Wins: 29
- By knockout: 20
- By submission: 2
- By decision: 7
- Losses: 18
- By knockout: 8
- By submission: 2
- By decision: 8

Amateur boxing record
- Total: 45
- Wins: 40
- By knockout: 27
- Losses: 5

Other information
- Boxing record from BoxRec
- Mixed martial arts record from Sherdog

Fábio Maldonado
Medal record

Representing Brazil

Men's Boxing

Brazilian Championships
Gold medal – first place	2000 Mauá	+91 kg
Gold medal – first place	1999 Ibirité	-91 kg
Gold medal – first place	1998 São José do Rio Preto	+91 kg

Fábio Maldonado (born 17 March 1980) is a Brazilian professional mixed martial artist and boxer. A professional MMA competitor since 2000, he has also competed for the UFC.

== Boxing career ==
Simultaneous to becoming a mixed martial arts fighter, Maldonado also competed professionally as a boxer in his native Brazil, making his professional boxing debut in April 2002, after an amateur career of 40-5 with 27 knockouts. After his release from the UFC, Maldonado returned to professional boxing. He won his return fight with a round 1 TKO over Robson Bambu. Within less than a month, he proceeded to knock out Alessandro Bernardo in the first round with one punch.

== Mixed martial arts career ==
=== Early career ===
Maldonado made his professional mixed martial arts debut in September 2000 and also began training in Brazilian jiu-jitsu the same year. During the first eight years of his career, he competed exclusively in his native Brazil, and made his North American debut in November 2008.

In the decade previous to his debut with the Ultimate Fighting Championship, Maldonado compiled a record of 17-3. Notable victories from this period include Vitor Miranda and two TKO victories over Maiquel Falcão.

=== Ultimate Fighting Championship ===
Maldonado made his UFC debut at UFC 120 against James McSweeney and won by TKO after 48 seconds of round 3.

Maldonado lost to Kyle Kingsbury via unanimous decision on 4 June 2011 at The Ultimate Fighter 13 Finale. Despite the loss, Maldonado won the Fight of the Night bonus.

Maldonado was expected to face Aaron Rosa at UFC Live: Cruz vs. Johnson. but he was forced to pull out of the bout due to an injury.

Maldonado was expected to face UFC newcomer Caio Magalhaes on 14 January 2012 at UFC 142, but had to pull out from this bout due to a rib injury.

For his third UFC fight, Maldonado faced Igor Pokrajac on 15 May 2012 at UFC on Fuel TV: The Korean Zombie vs. Poirier. Even though Maldonado rocked Pokrajac on several occasions, he lost the back-and-forth fight via unanimous decision.

Maldonado was expected to face UFC newcomer Jorgen Kruth at UFC on Fuel TV 5. However, Kruth abruptly retired from MMA and Maldonado was briefly linked to a bout with Cyrille Diabate on 17 November 2012 at UFC 154. However, Maldonado stepped up and faced Glover Teixeira on 13 October 2012 at UFC 153, replacing an injured Quinton Jackson. Maldonado absorbed a tremendous amount of punishment on the ground, which was so brutal it earned "Beatdown of the Year" honors from Sherdog.com. Maldonado ultimately lost the fight at the end of the second round, when the doctor deemed him unable to continue.

Maldonado faced Roger Hollett on 18 May 2013 at UFC on FX 8. He won the fight via unanimous decision.

Maldonado next faced Joey Beltran on 9 October 2013 at UFC Fight Night 29. He won the back-and-forth fight via split decision.

Maldonado faced Gian Villante on 23 March 2014 at UFC Fight Night 38. After losing the first round to Villante, Maldonado rallied back to win the next two rounds utilizing his boxing and won the bout via unanimous decision (29–27, 29–28, and 29–28).

Maldonado faced Stipe Miocic in a heavyweight bout on 31 May 2014 at The Ultimate Fighter Brazil 3 Finale, replacing Junior dos Santos. He lost the fight by TKO due to punches early in the first round.

Maldonado faced Hans Stringer on 25 October 2014 at UFC 179. He won the fight via TKO in the second round. The win also earned Maldonado his first Performance of the Night bonus award.

Maldonado was expected to face returning veteran Quinton Jackson on 25 April 2015 at UFC 186. However, on 7 April Jackson was removed from the card after his most recent employer, Bellator MMA, was granted an injunction by a New Jersey Superior Court judge preventing him from competing for the UFC after it was alleged that he breached a deal signed in June 2013. On 21 April a judge in the Superior Court of New Jersey's Appellate Division overturned the injunction against Jackson, allowing him to compete for the UFC. The bout took place at a catchweight of 215 lbs. Maldonado lost the fight by unanimous decision.

Maldonado was expected to face Tom Lawlor on 7 November 2015 at UFC Fight Night 77. However, Lawlor was forced from the bout with injury and replaced by Corey Anderson. He lost the one sided fight by unanimous decision and was subsequently released from the promotion.

=== Fight Nights Global ===
Maldonado made his Fight Nights Global debut facing Pride and Strikeforce vet Fedor Emelianenko on 17 June 2016 at "Fight Nights Global 50" competing for a regional promotion in Russia. Despite dropping and nearly finishing Emelianenko on multiple occasions in the first round, Emelianenko rallied over the last two rounds and was awarded a controversial majority decision victory. 4 of 5 media outlets scored the bout a draw. All three judges being appointed by the Russian MMA Union was seen as a conflict of interest. In turn, in mid-July, the World MMA Association (WMMAA) said they declared the fight a draw. However, the official result will not be overturned.

In the second fight for the promotion, he faced Mikhail Mokhnatkin at Fight Nights Global 52 on 1 October 2016. He lost the fight via unanimous decision.

Maldonado faced Abdul-Khamid-Davlyatov at Fight Nights Global 60 on 5 March 2017. He won the fight via technical knockout in the first round.

Maldonado faced Kurban Omarov at Fight Nights Global 73 on 4 September 2017. He won the fight via submission in the third round to win the vacant FNG Light Heavyweight championship.

In the first defense of his title, Maldonado faced Nikita Krylov on 19 May 2018 at Fight Nights Global 87. He lost the fight via knockout in the second round.

=== Rizin FF ===
After the stint in FNG, Maldonado signed a one-fight contract with the Rizin Fighting Federation. He made his promotional debut in a non-title bout against Rizin FF Light Heavyweight champion Jiří Procházka at Rizin 19 on 12 October 2019. He lost the fight via TKO in the first round.

=== Serbian Battle Championship & UAE Warriors ===
Next, he faced Pelu Adetola at Serbian Battle Championships 27 on 14 March 2020. He won the bout via unanimous decision.

Maldonado challenged Chi Lewis-Parry for the UAE Warriors Heavyweight Championship at UAE Warriors 13 on 25 September 2020. He lost the fight via TKO in the first round.

=== Independent promotions ===
He faced Eli Reger Schablatura Pinto at Gladiator Combat Fight 53 on 24 October 2020. He won the fight via first-round technical knockout.

Maldonado was next expected to face Malik Merad at Arena FC 2 on 12 December 2020, but the whole event was postponed due to multiple COVID-19 cases.

He then faced Gabriel Kanabo at Samurai FC 25 on 28 May 2021. He won the bout via first-round technical knockout.

==== Parus FC ====
He challenged Sergei Kharitonov for the Parus FC Heavyweight Championship at an Parus FC event on 6 November 2021. He lost the bout via TKO in the first round.

==== Ural FC ====
Maldonado faced Kirill Sidelnikov on Ural FC 1 on 1 July 2022. He lost the bout via TKO in the first round.

== Bare-knuckle boxing ==
Maldonado made his Bare Knuckle Fighting Championship debut against John Phillips on 5 April 2025 at BKFC 72 Dubai: Day 2. After being knocked down a second time, he lost the fight by knockout in the second round.

== Championships and accomplishments ==
=== Mixed martial arts ===
- Fight Nights Global
  - FNG Light Heavyweight Championship (One time)
- Ultimate Fighting Championship
  - Fight of the Night (One time) vs. Kyle Kingsbury
  - Performance of the Night (One time) vs. Hans Stringer
  - UFC.com Awards
    - 2011: Ranked #9 Fight of the Year vs. Kyle Kingsbury

=== Boxing ===
- Universal Boxing Council
  - UBC Iberian-American Heavyweight Championship (One time)
- Liga Paulista de Boxe Profissional
  - São Paulo State Heavyweight Championship (One time)
- Confederação Brasileira de Boxe
  - Brazil Amateur National Championship (1998, 1999, 2000)
- Federação Paulista de Boxe
  - São Paulo Amateur State Championship (2000, 2001)
  - São Paulo Amateur State Championship Runner-up (1999)
  - 2001 Jogos Abertos do Interior Amateur Tournament Gold Medalist
  - 2001 Golden Gloves Amateur Tournament Gold Medalist
  - 1999 Jogos Abertos do Interior Amateur Tournament Gold Medalist
  - 1998 Forja de Campeões Amateur Tournament Gold Medalist
  - 1998 Jogos Abertos do Interior Amateur Tournament Gold Medalist
  - 1997 Jogos Abertos do Interior Amateur Tournament Gold Medalist

== Mixed martial arts record ==
Professional record breakdown
47 matches	29 wins	18 losses
By knockout	20	8
By submission	2	2
By decision	7	8

Res.	Record	Opponent	Method	Event	Date	Round	Time	Location	Notes
Win	29–18	Luis Andrade de Oliveira	TKO (punches)	Brothers Fight Champion: Golden Edition	4 December 2025	2	2:13	Florianópolis, Brazil	Return to Heavyweight.
Loss	28–18	Nemanja Kovač	Decision (unanimous)	Serbian Battle Championship 51	31 August 2025	3	5:00	Odžaci, Serbia	Middleweight debut.
Loss	28–17	Kirill Sidelnikov	TKO (punches)	Ural FC 1	1 July 2022	1	0:45	Perm, Russia	
Loss	28–16	Sergei Kharitonov	TKO (punches)	Modern Fighting Pankration: Parus FC 3	6 November 2021	1	3:28	Dubai, United Arab Emirates	For the Parus FC Heavyweight Championship
Win	28–15	Gabriel Kanabo	TKO (punches)	Samurai FC 25	28 May 2021	1	1:47	Curitiba, Brazil	
Win	27–15	Eli Reger Schablatura Pinto	TKO (punches)	Gladiator Combat Fight 53	24 October 2020	1	3:32	Paraná, Brazil	
Loss	26–15	Chi Lewis-Parry	KO (elbows)	UAE Warriors 13	25 September 2020	1	1:08	Abu Dhabi, UAE	For the UAE Warriors Heavyweight Championship.
Win	26–14	Pelu Adetola	Decision (unanimous)	Serbian Battle Championship 27	14 March 2020	3	5:00	Vrbas, Serbia	Heavyweight bout.
Loss	25–14	Jiří Procházka	KO (punches)	Rizin 19	12 October 2019	1	1:49	Osaka, Japan	Catchweight (220.5 lbs) bout.
Win	25–13	Thiago Silva Batista	KO (punch)	Vikings Fight Club 5 - Balada Fight	22 December 2018	1	1:37	Campinas, Brazil	
Loss	24–13	Ivan Shtyrkov	TKO (punches)	RCC 4	27 October 2018	2	1:23	Ekaterinburg, Russia	
Loss	24–12	Nikita Krylov	KO (punch)	Fight Nights Global 87: Khachatryan vs. Queally	19 May 2018	2	3:33	Rostov-on-Don, Russia	Lost FNG Light Heavyweight Championship.
Win	24–11	Kurban Omarov	Submission (guillotine choke)	Fight Nights Global 73: Aliev vs. Brandão	4 September 2017	3	3:01	Kaspiysk, Russia	Won the Vacant FNG Light Heavyweight Championship.
Win	23–11	Abdul-Khamid Davlyatov	TKO (punches)	Fight Nights Global 60: Aryshev vs. Khasanov	5 March 2017	1	4:20	Dushanbe, Tajikistan	Heavyweight bout.
Loss	22–11	Mikhail Mokhnatkin	Decision (unanimous)	Fight Nights Global 52: Mokhnatkin vs. Maldonado	1 October 2016	3	5:00	Nizhnevartovsk, Russia	Heavyweight bout.
Loss	22–10	Fedor Emelianenko	Decision (majority)	Fight Nights Global 50: Fedor vs. Maldonado	17 June 2016	3	5:00	St. Petersburg, Russia	Heavyweight bout. Result unofficially ruled a Draw by the World Mixed Martial Arts Association; however, that decision has not been recognized by the Russian MMA Union.
Loss	22–9	Corey Anderson	Decision (unanimous)	UFC Fight Night: Belfort vs. Henderson 3	7 November 2015	3	5:00	São Paulo, Brazil	
Loss	22–8	Quinton Jackson	Decision (unanimous)	UFC 186	25 April 2015	3	5:00	Montreal, Quebec, Canada	Catchweight (215 lbs) bout.
Win	22–7	Hans Stringer	TKO (punches)	UFC 179	25 October 2014	2	4:06	Rio de Janeiro, Brazil	Performance of the Night.
Loss	21–7	Stipe Miocic	TKO (punches)	The Ultimate Fighter Brazil 3 Finale: Miocic vs. Maldonado	31 May 2014	1	0:35	São Paulo, Brazil	Heavyweight bout.
Win	21–6	Gian Villante	Decision (unanimous)	UFC Fight Night: Shogun vs. Henderson 2	23 March 2014	3	5:00	Natal, Brazil	
Win	20–6	Joey Beltran	Decision (split)	UFC Fight Night: Maia vs. Shields	9 October 2013	3	5:00	Barueri, Brazil	
Win	19–6	Roger Hollett	Decision (unanimous)	UFC on FX: Belfort vs. Rockhold	18 May 2013	3	5:00	Jaraguá do Sul, Brazil	
Loss	18–6	Glover Teixeira	TKO (doctor stoppage)	UFC 153	13 October 2012	2	5:00	Rio de Janeiro, Brazil	
Loss	18–5	Igor Pokrajac	Decision (unanimous)	UFC on Fuel TV: The Korean Zombie vs. Poirier	15 May 2012	3	5:00	Fairfax, Virginia, United States	
Loss	18–4	Kyle Kingsbury	Decision (unanimous)	The Ultimate Fighter: Team Lesnar vs. Team dos Santos Finale	4 June 2011	3	5:00	Las Vegas, Nevada, United States	Fight of the Night.
Win	18–3	James McSweeney	TKO (punches)	UFC 120	16 October 2010	3	0:48	London, England	Light Heavyweight debut.
Win	17–3	Nelson Martins	TKO (punches)	First Class Fight 4	30 June 2010	1	0:40	São Paulo, Brazil	
Win	16–3	Jackson Mora	Submission (guillotine choke)	Memorial Fight Qualifying	4 June 2010	1	1:19	Santos, Brazil	
Win	15–3	Jessie Gibbs	Submission (punches)	Bitetti Combat MMA 7	28 May 2010	2	2:52	Rio de Janeiro, Brazil	
Win	14–3	Alessandro Leal	TKO (punches)	Combat Power Championship	13 March 2010	1	4:57	Piracicaba, Brazil	
Win	13–3	Fernando Tressino	TKO (corner stoppage)	Bitetti Combat MMA 5	12 December 2009	2	5:00	Barueri, Brazil	
Win	12–3	Vitor Miranda	Decision (unanimous)	Bitetti Combat MMA 4	12 September 2009	3	5:00	Rio de Janeiro, Brazil	
Win	11–3	Edgard Castaldelli Filho	TKO (punches)	Predador FC 12	3 December 2008	2	4:44	São Paulo, Brazil	
Win	10–3	Shaton Vaughn	Submission (guillotine choke)	Fightworld 16: International	1 November 2008	1	4:48	Albuquerque, New Mexico, United States	
Win	9–3	Maiquel Falcão	TKO (punches)	Predador FC 9	15 March 2008	2	1:52	São Paulo, Brazil	
Win	8–3	Renato Matos	TKO (punches)	Predador FC 7	8 December 2007	1	0:50	São Paulo, Brazil	
Loss	7–3	Alexandre Ferreira	Submission (kneebar)	Mo Team League: Final	10 November 2007	1	0:27	São Paulo, Brazil	
Win	7–2	Vitor Miranda	Decision (unanimous)	Mo Team League 2	29 September 2007	3	5:00	São Paulo, Brazil	
Win	6–2	Maiquel Falcão	TKO (punches)	Circuito Mariliense MMA	18 May 2007	3	0:46	Marilia, Brazil	
Win	5–2	Ildemar Alcântara	Decision (unanimous)	Predador Kamae 2	25 January 2007	5	5:00	Florianópolis, Brazil	
Win	4–2	Cleisson Mamute	TKO (punches)	Pantanal Combat	10 February 2006	2	2:01	São Paulo, Brazil	
Win	3–2	Bruno Alves	TKO (punches)	Clube da Luta 1	14 December 2004	2	4:54	Salvador, Brazil	
Loss	2–2	Alessandro Leal	Submission (kneebar)	Meca World Vale Tudo 5	9 June 2000	1	5:22	Curitiba, Brazil	
Loss	2–1	Omni Santos	Decision (unanimous)	Surf Fight Circuit: Day 2	23 September 2000	2	10:00	Brasília, Brazil	
Win	2–0	Augusto Menezes Santos	TKO (punches)	Surf Fight Circuit: Day 1	22 September 2000	2	3:03	Brasília, Brazil	
Win	1–0	Robson Parazinho	TKO (punches)	Surf Fight Circuit: Day 1	22 September 2000	1	2:21	Brasília, Brazil	

== Professional boxing record ==
41 fights	30 wins	11 losses
By knockout	29	6
By decision	0	5
By disqualification	1	0

No.	Result	Record	Opponent	Type	Round, time	Date	Location	Notes
41	Loss	30–11	Deontae Pettigrew	TKO	2 (8), 1:13	24 Nov 2024	The Dome at The Ballpark, Rosemont, Illinois, US	
40	Loss	30–10	Andrzej Fonfara	TKO	2 (6), 2:47	20 Jul 2024	Compass Arena, Willowbrook, Illinois, US	
39	Win	30–9	Leonardo Guimaraes	TKO	4 (6), 0:41	24 Feb 2024	Fight Music Show 4, Vibra, Sao Paulo, Brazil	
38	Loss	29–9	Siarhei Novikau	UD	8	20 Jan 2024	Seminole Hard Rock Hotel & Casino, Hollywood, Florida, US	
37	Loss	29–8	Krzysztof Włodarczyk	TKO	7 (10), 2:50	7 Oct 2023	Hala Widowiskowo-Sportowa, Aleja Jana Pawla, Poland	
36	Loss	29–7	Jeremiah Milton	UD	8	1 Apr 2023	Hard Rock Hotel & Casino, Tulsa, Oklahoma, US	
35	Win	29–6	Vitor Regis Eustaquio	TKO	6 (8), 1:56	26 Nov 2022	Hotel Golden Park, Sorocaba, Sao Paulo, Brazil	
34	Loss	28–6	Yamil Alberto Peralta	TKO	3 (12), 1:40	17 Sep 2022	Club Municipal Lagomarsino, Pilar, Argentina	
33	Win	28–5	Joselito dos Santos	TKO	2 (8), 1:53	12 Feb 2022	Arena Santos, São Paulo, Brazil	
32	Win	27–5	Diogo da Conceicao Oliveira	KO	3 (8), 2:40	4 Sep 2021	Coliseu Boxe Center, Guarulhos, Brazil	
31	Loss	26–5	Ruslan Fayfer	TKO	1 (10), 2:08	25 Jun 2021	WOW Arena, Krasnaya Polyana, Russia	
30	Loss	26–4	Carlos Takam	UD	10	28 Feb 2020	Paramount Theatre, Huntington, New York, US	
29	Loss	26–3	Michael Hunter	TKO	2 (10), 1:45	25 May 2019	MGM National Harbor, Oxon Hill, Maryland, US	For WBA International heavyweight title
28	Loss	26–2	Oleksandr Teslenko	UD	10	29 Mar 2019	The Mattamy Events Center, Toronto, Canada	For WBA-NABA heavyweight title
27	Loss	26–1	Oscar Rivas	UD	10	1 Dec 2018	Videotron Centre, Quebec City, Canada	For WBC-NABF heavyweight title
26	Win	26–0	Clayton Soriano de Lyra	KO	3 (6), 0:58	29 Sep 2018	Ginásio Municipal Falcâo, Praia Grande, Brazil	
25	Win	25–0	Clayton Soriano de Lyra	KO	2 (8), 1:02	7 Apr 2017	Hotel Golden Park, Sorocaba, Brazil	
24	Win	24–0	Alessandro Bernardo	TKO	1 (6), 0:29	4 Mar 2016	Arena Santos, Santos, Brazil	
23	Win	23–0	Robson Bambu	KO	1 (6), 1:35	27 Feb 2016	Combat Club, São Paulo, Brazil	
22	Win	22–0	Carlos Barcelete	TKO	1 (6), 2:40	11 Jun 2010	Prefeitura Municipal, Pitangueiras, Brazil	
21	Win	21–0	Eduardo Franca	TKO	1 (10), 2:48	1 May 2010	Ginásio João Sebastião Ferraro, Salto, Brazil	
20	Win	20–0	Carlos Alberto De Oliveira Junior	TKO	3 (6), 1:37	20 Mar 2009	Centro Esportivo Robinho, São Vicente, Brazil	
19	Win	19–0	Richard Da Gloria	TKO	3 (6), 2:43	28 Feb 2009	Club 109, São Paulo, Brazil	
18	Win	18–0	Adriano Vicente	TKO	1 (10), 0:56	27 Dec 2008	Sodré Santoro Arena, Guarulhos, Brazil	Won vacant São Paulo State heavyweight title
17	Win	17–0	Rodrigo Oliveira de Lima	TKO	2 (6)	4 Oct 2008	Rio de Janeiro, Brazil	
16	Win	16–0	Gelson Letra	TKO	2 (6), 0:52	13 Sep 2008	Ginásio do GRES Valencia, São Paulo, Brazil	
15	Win	15–0	Augusto Custodio de Melo	KO	1 (6), 1:38	21 Feb 2008	Vale do Anhangabaú, São Paulo, Brazil	
14	Win	14–0	Vonilson Maciel dos Santos	KO	2 (6), 1:03	26 Jan 2008	Ginásio Edvaldo Oliveira Chaves "Pita", Cubatão, Brazil	
13	Win	13–0	Sidney De Oliveira da Silva	TKO	2 (6)	31 Aug 2007	Ginasio de Esportes Antonio Guenaga, Santos, Brazil	
12	Win	12–0	Augusto Custodio de Melo	TKO	1 (6), 0:55	3 Aug 2007	Ginasio Municipal Blota Junior, Ribeirão Bonito, Brazil	
11	Win	11–0	Paulo Dos Santos Aragao	KO	1 (12), 0:15	6 May 2007	Clube Atletico Guarany, São Paulo, Brazil	Won vacant UBC Iberian-American heavyweight title
10	Win	10–0	Valtencir Franca	RTD	3 (10), 3:00	23 Dec 2006	Associacao Des Polícia Militar, Sorocaba, Brazil	
9	Win	9–0	Josias Ribeiro	KO	5 (8)	2 Apr 2005	Ginasio Municipal, Vitória da Conquista, Brazil	
8	Win	8–0	Glen Morgan	DQ	4 (6), 1:15	4 Jun 2004	Desert Diamond Casino, Tucson, Arizona, US	
7	Win	7–0	John Turlington	TKO	3 (4), 1:42	17 May 2004	Bally's Las Vegas, Las Vegas, Nevada, US	
6	Win	6–0	Tim Grant	KO	1 (4), 1:14	17 May 2003	Trump Taj Mahal, Atlantic City, New Jersey, US	
5	Win	5–0	Richard Da Gloria	KO	2 (4), 2:03	7 Nov 2002	Ginasio Baby Barioni, São Paulo, Brazil	
4	Win	4–0	Jonatas Dos Santos	TKO	2 (4)	17 Aug 2002	São Paulo, Brazil	
3	Win	3–0	Edson Arantes do Lino	KO	1 (6), 2:35	23 Jul 2002	Ginasio Baby Barioni, São Paulo, Brazil	
2	Win	2–0	Eron Chaves	KO	1 (6)	18 May 2002	Ginasio Municipal, Araras, Brazil	
1	Win	1–0	Marival Sobral Sobrinho	TKO	1 (4)	23 Apr 2002	Ginasio Baby Barioni, São Paulo, Brazil	

== Bare knuckle boxing record ==
Professional record breakdown
1 match	0 wins	1 loss
By knockout	0	1

Res.	Record	Opponent	Method	Event	Date	Round	Time	Location	Notes
Loss	0–1	John Phillips	KO (punch)	BKFC 72 Dubai: Day 2	5 April 2025	2	0:29	Dubai, United Arab Emirates	

== See also ==
- List of male mixed martial artists
