= Chad Griggs =

American mixed martial artist

- Born: May 15, 1978 (age 48); Tucson, Arizona, U.S.
- Other names: The Grave Digger
- Height: 6 ft 1 in (185 cm)
- Weight: 205 lb (93 kg; 14 st 9 lb)
- Division: Heavyweight (265 lb); Light Heavyweight (205 lb)
- Reach: 73 in (185 cm)
- Style: Freestyle
- Fighting out of: Tucson, Arizona
- Team: Apex MMA/Fight Legion
- Years active: 2005–2013

Mixed martial arts record
- Total: 14
- Wins: 11
- By knockout: 11
- Losses: 3
- By submission: 3

Amateur record
- Total: 1
- Wins: 1
- By knockout: 1

Other information
- Mixed martial arts record from Sherdog

Chad Griggs (born May 15, 1978) is an American former mixed martial artist. A professional competitor from 2005 to 2013, he competed in the International Fight League, Strikeforce, and Ultimate Fighting Championship.

== Background ==
Griggs is from Tucson, Arizona and attended Sahuaro High School. He was introduced to mixed martial arts when he began training and frequently sparring with legendary fighter Don Frye. Griggs attended college, where he received his EMT and paramedic certification.

=== Early career ===
Griggs won his lone amateur fight via knockout in 13 seconds, and then made his professional debut in December 2005, on the first Total Fighting Alliance card. He fought and quickly defeated Johnathan Tsosie, an 0–3 fighter at the time, only eighteen seconds into round one. In April 2006, Griggs took his second fight against UFC veteran Homer Moore, on a Rage in the Cage card. Griggs again won via TKO.

Only a month after his second fight, Griggs fought Johnathan Tsosie in a rematch from their December fight. Griggs again came out victorious, winning via submission due to punches. He won another fight before signing with upstart promotion, the International Fight League.

=== International Fight League ===
Griggs signed with the IFL in 2007, and was picked to be a part of the Tucson Scorpions, coached by Don Frye. He made his promotional debut at IFL: Houston that took place on February 2, 2007. His opponent was PRIDE and UFC veteran, John Marsh. Griggs won the fight by TKO in the third round.

At that time undefeated, he then fought at IFL: Connecticut against Shane Ott. Ott defeated Griggs with a kimura submission early in round one. Griggs was released from the promotion, despite the loss being the first of his career.

=== Regional circuits ===
Griggs won two fights after being released from the IFL. After his second win, he took a year and a half off from competition. He returned in April 2009, winning against Jon Alexander at Ultimate Style Fighting: Rumble in Wyoming.

=== Strikeforce ===
Griggs made his debut for Strikeforce at Strikeforce: Houston on August 21, 2010, against former professional wrestling star and standout collegiate wrestler Bobby Lashley. Griggs defeated Lashley by TKO when the ref stopped the fight after Griggs stuffed a Lashley takedown and pummeled Lashley with hammerfists from a standing position as Lashley held onto Griggs' ankle and tried to cover up from the blows.

Griggs next fight for Strikeforce came against promotional newcomer Gian Villante at Strikeforce: Fedor vs. Silva. Griggs won the fight in the first round via TKO. The fight served as a reserve bout for the Strikeforce Heavyweight Grand Prix.

Griggs' next fight was against Valentijn Overeem at Strikeforce: Overeem vs. Werdum on June 18, 2011, in Dallas, Texas. He won the fight via submission to strikes in the first round.

=== Ultimate Fighting Championship ===
With the elimination of the Strikeforce Heavyweight division, Griggs moved to the UFC in 2012 and faced Travis Browne on April 21, 2012, at UFC 145. He lost the bout in the first round via submission due to an arm-triangle choke.

Griggs was expected to face Phil Davis in his Light Heavyweight debut on August 4, 2012, at UFC on FOX 4. However, Griggs was forced out of the bout with an injury and replaced by promotional newcomer Wagner Prado.

After moving down to Light Heavyweight, Griggs lost to Cyrille Diabaté via first round rear-naked choke submission on November 17, 2012, at UFC 154. He was released from the UFC on January 18, 2013.

== Personal life ==
Griggs has two children with his ex-wife, Julie. He has been in a relationship with Stevie Dillon since 2023. Griggs also works as a full-time firefighter and a paramedic with the Tucson Fire Department.

== Mixed martial arts record ==
Professional record breakdown
| 14 matches | 11 wins | 3 losses |
| By knockout | 11 | 0 |
| By submission | 0 | 3 |
| By decision | 0 | 0 |

| Res. | Record | Opponent | Method | Event | Date | Round | Time | Location | Notes |
|---|---|---|---|---|---|---|---|---|---|
| Loss | 11–3 | Cyrille Diabaté | Submission (rear-naked choke) | UFC 154 | November 17, 2012 | 1 | 2:24 | Montreal, Quebec, Canada | Light Heavyweight debut. |
| Loss | 11–2 | Travis Browne | Submission (arm-triangle choke) | UFC 145 | April 21, 2012 | 1 | 2:29 | Atlanta, Georgia, United States | |
| Win | 11–1 | Valentijn Overeem | TKO (submission to punches) | Strikeforce: Overeem vs. Werdum | June 18, 2011 | 1 | 2:08 | Dallas, Texas, United States | Strikeforce Heavyweight Grand Prix Reserve Bout. |
| Win | 10–1 | Gian Villante | TKO (punches) | Strikeforce: Fedor vs. Silva | February 12, 2011 | 1 | 2:49 | East Rutherford, New Jersey, United States | Strikeforce Heavyweight Grand Prix Reserve Bout. |
| Win | 9–1 | Bobby Lashley | TKO (doctor stoppage) | Strikeforce: Houston | August 21, 2010 | 2 | 5:00 | Houston, Texas, United States | |
| Win | 8–1 | Jon Alexander | KO (elbows) | USF: Rumble in Wyoming | April 25, 2009 | 1 | 1:13 | Casper, Wyoming, United States | |
| Win | 7–1 | Eric Garcia | TKO (punches) | All Power Combat 1 | November 17, 2007 | 1 | 1:02 | Arizona, United States | |
| Win | 6–1 | Steve Sayegh | TKO (punches) | Rage in the Cage 101 | October 6, 2007 | 1 | 2:28 | Fountain Hills, Arizona, United States | |
| Loss | 5–1 | Shane Ott | Submission (kimura) | IFL: Connecticut | April 13, 2007 | 1 | 1:09 | Uncasville, Connecticut, United States | |
| Win | 5–0 | John Marsh | TKO (punches) | IFL: Houston | February 2, 2007 | 3 | 2:32 | Houston, Texas, United States | |
| Win | 4–0 | Tony Mendoza | TKO (punches) | WFC: Rumble in the Rockies | September 2, 2006 | 1 | 2:41 | Loveland, Colorado, United States | |
| Win | 3–0 | Johnathan Tsosie | TKO (submission to punches) | Rage in the Cage 82 | May 26, 2006 | 1 | 0:43 | Tucson, Arizona, United States | |
| Win | 2–0 | Homer Moore | TKO (punches) | Rage in the Cage 81 | April 29, 2006 | 3 | 0:30 | Mesa, Arizona, United States | |
| Win | 1–0 | Johnathan Tsosie | TKO (punches) | Total Fighting Alliance 1 | December 10, 2005 | 1 | 0:18 | Campo, California, United States | |

== See also ==
- List of Strikeforce alumni
