= Cain Velasquez =

American mixed martial arts fighter and professional wrestler (born 1982)

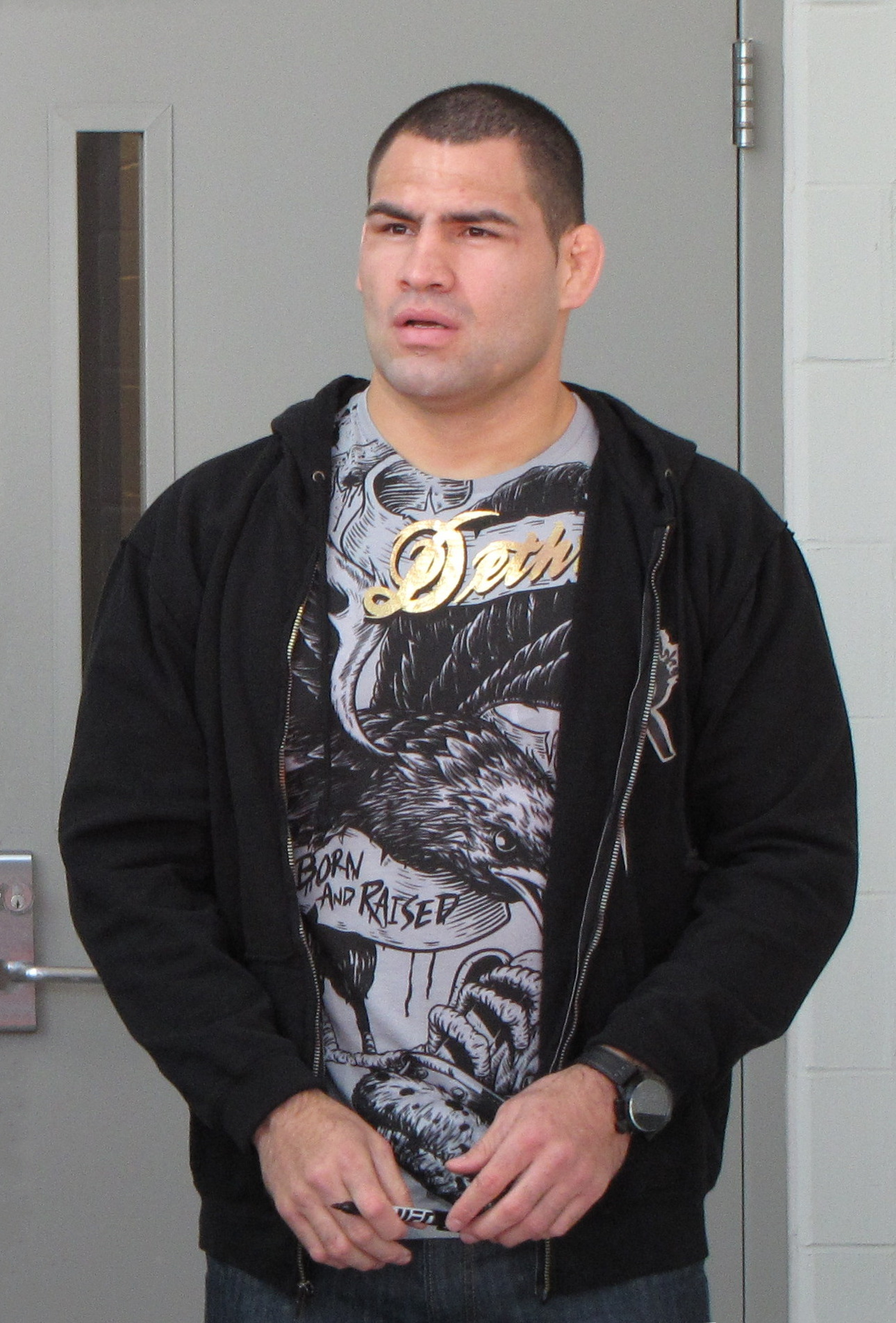
- Velasquez in 2010
- Born: Cain Ramírez Velásquez; July 28, 1982 (age 44); Salinas, California, U.S.
- Height: 6 ft 1 in (185 cm)
- Weight: 241 lb (109 kg; 17 st 3 lb)
- Division: Heavyweight
- Reach: 77 in (196 cm)
- Fighting out of: San Jose, California, U.S.
- Team: American Kickboxing Academy
- Trainer: Daniel Cormier (wrestling); Javier Mendez (kickboxing); Leandro Vieira (Brazilian Jiu-Jitsu); Joe Grosso (strength); Rosendo Sanchez (boxing)
- Rank: Black belt in Brazilian Jiu-Jitsu under Leandro Vieira
- Wrestling: NCAA Division I Wrestling
- Years active: 2006–2019 (MMA); 2019–2022 (professional wrestling)

Mixed martial arts record
- Total: 17
- Wins: 14
- By knockout: 12
- By decision: 2
- Losses: 3
- By knockout: 2
- By submission: 1

Other information
- University: Arizona State University
- Spouse: Michelle Velasquez
- Children: 2
- Notable school: Kofa High School
- Mixed martial arts record from Sherdog
Medal record
Men's collegiate wrestling
Representing the Iowa Central Tritons
NJCAA Championships
Gold medal – first place	2002 Rochester	285 lb
Representing the Arizona State Sun Devils
Pac-10 Championships
Gold medal – first place	2005 San Luis Obispo	285 lb
Silver medal – second place	2006 Fullerton	285 lb

Cain Ramírez Velásquez (born July 28, 1982) is an American former professional wrestler and mixed martial artist. He is widely known for his time in the Ultimate Fighting Championship (UFC), where he competed in the heavyweight division and became a two-time UFC Heavyweight Champion.

In 2019, Velasquez retired from mixed martial arts. That same year, Velasquez embarked on a professional wrestling career, firstly working for the Mexican lucha libre promotion Lucha Libre AAA Worldwide (AAA) before moving to the American WWE promotion. In April 2020, he was released from his WWE contract due to budget cuts resulting from the COVID-19 pandemic.

In March 2022, he was charged with attempted murder and additional gun assault charges after engaging in a car chase and allegedly shooting at a man who was alleged to have molested Velasquez's 4-year-old son, missing the man and hitting the man's stepfather instead. In March 2025, Velasquez was sentenced to five years in prison and four years of supervised probation.

Velasquez was granted early parole and released from custody on February 15, 2026, after serving his sentence with credit for time served and participation in rehabilitative programs. His release followed a five-year sentence stemming from the 2022 shooting incident and marked the conclusion of his incarceration period.

== Early life and education ==
Caín Velasquez was born in Salinas, California, to Efraín and Isabel Velasquez. Efraín had moved to the U.S. from Sonora, Mexico, as an illegal immigrant, where he met American-born Isabel. They started a relationship and later married, which allowed Efraín to attain U.S. citizenship.

Velasquez has two older siblings: a sister name Adela who’s the oldest and a brother named Efraín Jr who’s the middle child. He and his siblings were raised in Yuma, Arizona. He graduated from Kofa High School where, in four years of wrestling, he compiled a record of 110–10 and won the 5A Arizona Wrestling Championship twice. Velasquez also played American football for three years. As a senior, he served as captain of both his wrestling and football teams. As a football player, he played linebacker.

After high school, he attended Iowa Central Community College, wrestling for one season (2001–02) and winning the NJCAA National Championship in the heavyweight (285 lb limit) division. Afterwards, Velasquez transferred to Arizona State University. He wrestled for the Sun Devils for three seasons and compiled a record of 86–17, placing 5th in the country in 2005, and 4th in 2006. While at ASU earning All-American status twice, Velasquez wrestled alongside future UFC fighters Ryan Bader and C.B. Dollaway. He graduated from ASU in 2006, earning a bachelor's degree in interdisciplinary studies.

Growing up, Velasquez was a fan of Bruce Lee and Jean-Claude Van Damme, stating, "I grew up watching ‘Kickboxer,’ and these were the movies I grew up watching. I was a big fan of Bruce Lee, big fan of Van Damme, and in the late 80s and 90s, he ruled the scene as far as fighting movies. They were classics for me, so to be part of it and go over there to do a fight scene (in Kickboxer: Vengeance), that was awesome."

== Mixed martial arts career ==
=== Early career ===
Velasquez began his mixed martial arts career right after college, joining American Kickboxing Academy. Velasquez is a brown belt in Guerrilla Jiu-Jitsu under Dave Camarillo, a black belt in Brazilian Jiu-Jitsu under Leandro Vieira, and an NCAA Division I Wrestler.

Velasquez made his MMA debut on October 7, 2006, against Jesse Fujarczyk at Strikeforce: Tank vs. Buentello, he won by TKO in the first round. Velasquez faced then-undefeated Jeremiah Constant at BodogFight: St. Petersburg, winning via TKO in the first round.

Velasquez made his UFC debut against Brad Morris at UFC 83 and won by TKO in the first round.

In his next fight, Velasquez defeated Jake O'Brien at UFC Fight Night 14 via TKO in round one.

Velasquez then faced Denis Stojnić at UFC Fight Night 17. Velasquez won by TKO in the second round and was awarded Knockout of the Night honors for his performance.

Velasquez's next fight was at UFC 99 against former kickboxer and heavyweight contender Cheick Kongo. Velasquez was once again dominant, landing 251 strikes and winning the bout by unanimous decision (30–27, 30–27, and 30–27).

His next opponent was expected to be Shane Carwin with the winner likely challenging for the UFC Heavyweight Championship held by Brock Lesnar. However, that bout was scrapped and Velasquez was instead told he would be fighting UFC newcomer Ben Rothwell at UFC 104. He defeated Rothwell by second-round TKO.

Velasquez faced former Pride Heavyweight Champion and former Interim UFC Heavyweight Champion Antônio Rodrigo Nogueira on February 20, 2010, at UFC 110. Going into the fight, some commentators predicted that Nogueira would take the victory due to a supposed lack of striking power for Velasquez. Velasquez defeated Nogueira via first-round KO, earning Knockout of the Night honors.

=== UFC Heavyweight Champion ===
With his victory over Nogueira, Velasquez earned a UFC Heavyweight Championship fight with then-champion Brock Lesnar at UFC 121. UFC brought back UFC Primetime to promote Lesnar vs. Velasquez. Velasquez defeated Lesnar via TKO in the first round, earning Knockout of the Night honors.

Velasquez suffered a torn rotator cuff in his right shoulder during his fight with Lesnar and was expected to be side-lined for at least six to eight months. Surgery on the shoulder was successful and Velasquez planned to return as early as Fall 2011.

Velasquez was expected to make his first title defense against Junior dos Santos, with a target date of November 19, 2011, at UFC 139, but the fight was later moved to November 12, 2011, to headline the first UFC on Fox 1 event. Velasquez lost via KO (punches) at 1 minute and 4 seconds of the first round. It was later revealed that Dos Santos had a minor knee injury (a torn meniscus) and took an injection of cortisone into the knee before the fight. This was followed by the revelation that Velasquez had reinjured his rotator cuff approximately a week before the fight. Junior dos Santos had knee surgery following the fight.

Velasquez was originally set to fight Frank Mir on May 26, 2012, at UFC 146. However, Mir was moved up to face Junior dos Santos after Alistair Overeem was suspended for elevated testosterone levels. Velasquez instead faced Antônio Silva. Velasquez defeated Silva via first-round TKO, in a fight that saw Silva bleed profusely from his forehead. After the fight, Dana White strongly hinted that Velasquez would be the next fighter to challenge for the UFC Heavyweight Championship. It is widely thought that White made the decision to have the rematch with Dos Santos at such an unexpected time as both fighters were injured going into their first fight.

A rematch with dos Santos was expected to take place on September 22, 2012, at UFC 152. However, the date for the rematch was later set for UFC 155. In the rematch, Velasquez defeated Dos Santos in a dominant performance via unanimous decision (50–45, 50–43, and 50–44) to regain the UFC heavyweight title. Velasquez became the first fighter in UFC history to post triple digits in significant strikes landed and double digits in takedowns landed in a single fight, landing 111 significant strikes and eleven takedowns.

In his first title defense, Velasquez faced Antônio Silva in a rematch on May 25, 2013, at UFC 160. Velasquez won via TKO in the first round.

A rubber match with Junior dos Santos took place at UFC 166 on October 19, 2013, in Houston, Texas. Velasquez TKO at 3:09 of the fifth round, successfully defending his title.

On April 29, 2014, the UFC selected Velasquez and Fabrício Werdum as coaches for the inaugural installment of The Ultimate Fighter: Latin America, with the two expected to face each other on November 15, 2014, at UFC 180. However, on October 21, 2014, Velasquez pulled out of the bout due to a torn meniscus and sprained MCL in his right knee, and was replaced by Mark Hunt. On October 23, 2014, Velasquez underwent successful surgery to repair his torn meniscus.

A rescheduled bout with UFC Interim Heavyweight Champion Fabrício Werdum took place on June 13, 2015, at UFC 188. In a back-and-forth affair, Velasquez lost the fight via guillotine choke submission in the third round. Velasquez would later admit that he had not adequately prepared for the fight, held in Mexico City which sits at an altitude of 7,300 feet, as he had only moved his camp to elevation two weeks before the day of the card. In contrast, Werdum had spent more than a month in Mexico City to get used to the higher altitude.

=== Post-title loss, injuries, hiatus, and retirement ===
A rematch with Werdum was expected to take place on February 6, 2016, at UFC Fight Night 82 until both fighters backed out citing injuries.

Velasquez next faced Travis Browne on July 9, 2016, at UFC 200. He won the fight via TKO in the closing seconds of the first round.

The rematch against Werdum was rescheduled and expected to take place on December 30, 2016, at UFC 207. However, the Nevada State Athletic Commission failed to approve Velasquez to fight, determining after physical examinations and interviews that he was unfit to compete due to bone spurs on his back.

As the first fight of his new, four-fight contract, Velasquez headlined UFC's inaugural event on ESPN, UFC on ESPN 1 against Francis Ngannou on February 17, 2019. He lost the fight via knockout less than thirty seconds into round one.

On October 4, 2019, after Velasquez's first appearance for the WWE, it was revealed that Velasquez would be withdrawing from the USADA testing pool to focus on his professional wrestling career. Velasquez announced his retirement from MMA on October 11, 2019.

== Fighting style ==
Velasquez has a style that could be described as "swarming". He moves forward constantly, giving opponents very little room to land clean strikes, all while utilizing powerful and extremely swift punching combinations. He typically starts with a jab, follows up with a hard straight right, and then adds hooks and uppercuts as the fight progresses. He is strong in the clinch, where he throws long combinations that typically end in a takedown.

If Velasquez knocks his opponent to the ground during a fight, he often uses grappling skills to maintain a dominant position while he continues to strike from above. He does not usually attempt submissions. His wins have come either by striking from punches or by decision.

Velasquez was often praised for his cardiovascular training; he had tremendous endurance that allowed him to continue to fight aggressively after his opponents became exhausted, earning him the nickname "Cardio Cain". Velasquez's strong cardio also allowed him to throw more strikes. As of July 2013, he was ranked Number 1 for the most strikes landed per minute in the UFC.

== Professional wrestling career ==
=== Background (2018) ===
Velasquez has been a fan of professional wrestling since he was young. On July 19, 2018, it was reported that he trained in the WWE Performance Center under head coach Norman Smiley and later attended Diamond Dallas Page's yoga session. He had attended an NXT event the previous night.

=== Lucha Libre AAA Worldwide (2019) ===
In March 2019, Velasquez signed a multi-match agreement with Mexican professional wrestling promotion Lucha Libre AAA Worldwide as a heavyweight competitor. Velasquez made his debut for the promotion at Triplemanía XXVII in a trios match, teaming with Cody Rhodes and Psycho Clown to face Texano Jr, Taurus, and Killer Kross. Velasquez's debut surprised many fans, as he donned a luchador mask throughout the whole match and displayed many athletic moves, such as using a hurricanrana. Velasquez picked up the victory for his team by submitting Texano Jr. with a Kimura lock. Velasquez's in-ring debut received positive reviews by the Wrestling Observer Newsletter's Dave Meltzer and many other professional wrestling journalists, as well as other professional wrestlers and Velasquez's American Kickboxing Academy teammate Daniel Cormier. Velasquez competed in his second and final AAA match at Lucha Invades NY, where he teamed with Brian Cage and Psycho Clown to defeat Rey Escorpión, Texano Jr., and Taurus.

=== WWE (2019–2020) ===
On October 4, 2019, on the first episode of SmackDown on Fox, which was also the show's 20th Anniversary, Velasquez made his WWE debut, accompanied by Rey Mysterio, coming out to confront and eventually attack Brock Lesnar after his WWE Championship victory as a measure of revenge for Lesnar attacking Mysterio and his son, Dominik, earlier in the week. Velasquez took Lesnar down and pummeled him with punches before Lesnar escaped the ring and retreated. Velasquez then was scheduled to face Lesnar at Crown Jewel for the WWE Championship on October 31, which Velasquez lost. Following the match, Lesnar attacked Velasquez with a steel chair and delivered an F-5 onto another steel chair, before Mysterio intervened and saved him. In January 2020, WWE had planned to use Velasquez at their Royal Rumble pay-per-view event, but he suffered an injury and the idea was scrapped. On April 28, 2020, Velasquez was released from his WWE contract due to budget cuts resulting from the COVID-19 pandemic.

=== Return to AAA (2021, 2022) ===
On October 9, 2021, it was announced that Velasquez would be returning to AAA in December. Nine days later on October 18, it was announced that Velasquez would team with Psycho Clown and Pagano to face Los Mercenarios (Rey Escorpión and Taurus) and a mystery partner at Triplemanía Regia II. At the event, Velasquez's team defeated Escorpión, Taurus, and L.A. Park.

On December 3, 2022, Velasquez made his return to AAA, teaming with Pagano and Blue Demon Jr. to defeat La Empresa (Sam Adonis and Gringo Loco) and Taurus at an event held at the Mullett Arena on the campus of his alma mater Arizona State University.

== Personal life ==
Velasquez speaks English and Spanish. He has been a guest star on the Spanish-language television networks Telemundo and Univision, as well as Mexico's Televisa Deportes. In addition to his Spanish-language TV appearances, he was also a featured guest on the TBS late night show Lopez Tonight. Velasquez is known for sporting a prominent "Brown Pride" tattoo on his upper chest. He says this tattoo is a tribute to his Mexican heritage.

Velasquez and his wife Michelle have a daughter born in 2009 and a son born in 2018. The couple married on May 28, 2011. He lives in San Jose, California.

== Attempted murder conviction ==
On February 28, 2022, Velasquez shot at a man in Santa Clara County, California, and hit an unintended victim. The man who Velasquez allegedly intended to shoot, Harry Goularte Jr., had been arrested prior to the shooting for allegedly committing child sexual abuse on Velasquez's son at a daycare owned by Goularte's family, and was later released from custody on a personal recognizance bond. An armed Velasquez chased after a vehicle that contained Goularte Jr., his stepfather, and mother. Velasquez rammed the vehicle with his own before pulling out his firearm, shooting at the man through the window and missing, instead hitting the man's stepfather and causing him non-life threatening injuries.

Velasquez was later arrested and booked into the Santa Clara County jail on an attempted first-degree murder charge. In court on March 2, Velasquez was formally charged with one count of attempted first-degree murder, as well as several additional charges including one count of shooting at a motor vehicle, three counts of assault with a firearm, three counts of assault with a deadly weapon, one count of willfully discharging a firearm from a vehicle, and one count of carrying a loaded firearm with intent to commit a felony. On March 7, Velasquez was denied bail after the judge determined the "risk is too great" for Velasquez to potentially cause more issues to the public. Velasquez's lawyer, Mark Geragos, presented 37 letters of support for Velasquez from people such as Dana White, Khabib Nurmagomedov, Fabricio Werdum, Kelvin Gastelum, Henry Cejudo, Daniel Cormier, Cung Le, Islam Makhachev and Scott Coker. On April 12, 2022, the judge granted continuance until May 6 for a plea hearing. In the May 6 plea hearing, the second continuance was granted, pushing the hearing back to June 10. On May 16, Velasquez was denied bail a second time, with the judge citing his "reckless disregard for human life". At the June 10 plea hearing, a third continuance was requested by both parties due to discovery issues, and after being accepted by the prosecutor, the hearing was rescheduled for June 30.

On July 20, Velasquez's attorney filed a petition in the 6th District Court of Appeal, asking him to be immediately released on bond or expedited hearing in the superior court. In the August 5 motion hearing Velasquez pleaded not guilty to all charges. He was then scheduled to appear at a pre-trial hearing on September 26. After being incarcerated for eight months, Velasquez was granted $1 million bail on November 8. His bail was posted and Velasquez was released from custody the next day. As per the condition of his bail, Velasquez was placed under house arrest until the conclusion of his trial. On November 22, Velasquez was granted permission from the court to travel to Tempe, Arizona, to partake in a Lucha Libre AAA Worldwide professional wrestling event. Per the court, Velasquez was allowed to be without his ankle monitoring device while performing in-ring, but he was to be monitored by police throughout the course of his travel. On December 3, Velasquez participated in the Tempe event, winning his return match. The trial date was set for September 9, 2024, in Santa Clara County, California.

On August 16, 2024, Velasquez pleaded no contest to all charges. Velasquez's sentencing hearing was initially scheduled for October 18, but was later pushed back to March 24, 2025. At the March 24 sentencing hearing, Velasquez was sentenced to five years in prison and four years of supervised probation. With time served in county jail and under house arrest being credited, Velasquez was eligible for parole beginning in March 2026.

Velasquez was granted early parole and released from custody on February 15, 2026, after serving his sentence with credit for time served and participation in rehabilitative programs. His release followed a five-year sentence stemming from the 2022 shooting incident and marked the conclusion of his incarceration period.

=== Civil lawsuit against Goularte ===
On June 29, 2022, news surfaced that a civil lawsuit against Harry Goularte Jr. was filed on behalf of Velasquez's son, claiming that Goularte sexually molested him. The lawsuit was filed also against Goularte's mother and stepfather who operate the child-care business where the alleged sexual abuse took place. The first hearing for the lawsuit took place on September 6, 2022.

In June 2022, Goularte pleaded not guilty to related criminal charges, and after multiple continuations during the following year, the trial-setting hearing was set to take place on August 30, 2023. On October 18, 2024, it was reported that Goularte's next trial hearing was scheduled for November 13, 2024. A trial start date of March 9, 2026 is set.

== Championships and accomplishments ==
=== Mixed martial arts ===
- Ultimate Fighting Championship
  - UFC Heavyweight Championship (Two times)
    - Two successful title defenses
  - Knockout of the Night (Three times) vs. Denis Stojnić, Antônio Rodrigo Nogueira, and Brock Lesnar
  - Performance of the Night (One time) vs. Travis Browne
  - Tied (Junior Dos Santos & Francis Ngannou) for second most knockouts in UFC Heavyweight division history (10)
  - Second most takedowns landed in UFC Heavyweight division history (34)
  - Third most total strikes landed in UFC Heavyweight division history (1465)
  - Tied (Andrei Arlovski & Ciryl Gane) for second longest win streak in UFC Heavyweight division history (7)
  - Fourth most title fight wins in UFC Heavyweight division history (4)
  - Tied (Andrei Arlovski & Alistair Overeem) for third most knockdowns landed in UFC Heavyweight division history (10)
  - Second most knockouts stemming from ground strikes in UFC history (8) (behind Derrick Lewis)
  - UFC.com Awards
    - 2008: Ranked #2 Newcomer of the Year
    - 2009: Ranked #7 Fighter of the Year
    - 2010: Knockout of the Year vs. Brock Lesnar, Ranked #2 Fighter of the Year & Ranked #7 Knockout of the Year vs. Antônio Rodrigo Nogueira
    - 2012: Ranked #5 Fighter of the Year
    - 2013: Ranked #7 Fighter of the Year
- Sherdog
  - 2010 Fighter of the Year
  - 2010 All-Violence 1st Team
  - 2012 All-Violence 1st Team
  - 2013 All-Violence 1st Team
- Bleacher Report
  - 2010 Fighter of the Year
  - 2012 #6 Ranked Fighter of the Year
- MMA Junkie
  - 2010 Fighter of the Year
- Bloody Elbow
  - 2010 Fighter of the Year
- MMA Live
  - 2010 Fighter of the Year
- Wrestling Observer Newsletter
  - Most Outstanding Fighter (2013)
- Cagewriters
  - 2010 Fighter of the Year tied with Georges St-Pierre

=== Collegiate wrestling ===
- National Collegiate Athletic Association
  - NCAA Division I All-American (2005, 2006)
  - Pac-10 Conference Championship (2005, 2006)
  - Pac-10 Conference Wrestler of the Year (2005)
  - NCAA Division I 285 lb – 5th place out of Arizona State University (2005)
  - NCAA Division I 285 lb – 4th place out of Arizona State University (2006)
- National Junior College Athletic Association
  - NJCAA Junior Collegiate Championship (2002)
  - NJCAA All-American (2002)
- USA Wrestling
  - FILA Junior Freestyle World Team Trials Winner (2002)
  - ASICS Tiger High School All-American (2001)
  - Western Junior Freestyle Regional Championship (2001)
  - Western Junior Greco-Roman Regional Championship (2001)
- Arizona Interscholastic Association
  - AIA Division I High School State Championship (2000, 2001)
  - AIA 5A Conference Championship (1998, 1999, 2000, 2001)

== Pay-per-view bouts ==
No.	Event	Fight	Date	Venue	City	PPV Buys
1.	UFC 110	Nogueira vs. Velasquez	February 21, 2010	Acer Arena	Sydney, Australia	215,000
2.	UFC 121	Lesnar vs. Velasquez	October 23, 2010	Honda Center	Anaheim, California, United States	1,050,000
3.	UFC 155	dos Santos vs. Velasquez 2	December 29, 2012	MGM Grand Garden Arena	Las Vegas, Nevada, United States	590,000
4.	UFC 160	Velasquez vs. Bigfoot 2	May 25, 2013	MGM Grand Garden Arena	Las Vegas, Nevada, United States	380,000
5.	UFC 166	Velasquez vs. dos Santos 3	October 19, 2013	Toyota Center	Houston, Texas, United States	330,000
6.	UFC 188	Velasquez vs. Werdum	June 13, 2015	Arena Ciudad de México	Mexico City, Mexico	300,000

== Mixed martial arts record ==
Professional record breakdown
17 matches	14 wins	3 losses
By knockout	12	2
By submission	0	1
By decision	2	0

Res.	Record	Opponent	Method	Event	Date	Round	Time	Location	Notes
Loss	14–3	Francis Ngannou	KO (punches)	UFC on ESPN: Ngannou vs. Velasquez	February 17, 2019	1	0:26	Phoenix, Arizona, United States	
Win	14–2	Travis Browne	TKO (punches)	UFC 200	July 9, 2016	1	4:57	Las Vegas, Nevada, United States	Performance of the Night.
Loss	13–2	Fabrício Werdum	Submission (guillotine choke)	UFC 188	June 13, 2015	3	2:13	Mexico City, Mexico	Lost the UFC Heavyweight Championship.
Win	13–1	Junior dos Santos	TKO (slam and punch)	UFC 166	October 19, 2013	5	3:09	Houston, Texas, United States	Defended the UFC Heavyweight Championship.
Win	12–1	Antônio Silva	TKO (punches)	UFC 160	May 25, 2013	1	1:21	Las Vegas, Nevada, United States	Defended the UFC Heavyweight Championship.
Win	11–1	Junior dos Santos	Decision (unanimous)	UFC 155	December 29, 2012	5	5:00	Las Vegas, Nevada, United States	Won the UFC Heavyweight Championship.
Win	10–1	Antônio Silva	TKO (punches)	UFC 146	May 26, 2012	1	3:36	Las Vegas, Nevada, United States	
Loss	9–1	Junior dos Santos	KO (punches)	UFC on Fox: Velasquez vs. dos Santos	November 12, 2011	1	1:04	Anaheim, California, United States	Lost the UFC Heavyweight Championship.
Win	9–0	Brock Lesnar	TKO (punches)	UFC 121	October 23, 2010	1	4:12	Anaheim, California, United States	Won the UFC Heavyweight Championship. Knockout of the Night. Knockout of the Year.
Win	8–0	Antônio Rodrigo Nogueira	KO (punches)	UFC 110	February 21, 2010	1	2:20	Sydney, Australia	Knockout of the Night.
Win	7–0	Ben Rothwell	TKO (punches)	UFC 104	October 24, 2009	2	0:58	Los Angeles, California, United States	
Win	6–0	Cheick Kongo	Decision (unanimous)	UFC 99	June 13, 2009	3	5:00	Cologne, Germany	
Win	5–0	Denis Stojnić	TKO (punches)	UFC Fight Night: Lauzon vs. Stephens	February 7, 2009	2	2:34	Tampa, Florida, United States	Knockout of the Night.
Win	4–0	Jake O'Brien	TKO (punches)	UFC Fight Night: Silva vs. Irvin	July 19, 2008	1	2:02	Las Vegas, Nevada, United States	
Win	3–0	Brad Morris	TKO (punches)	UFC 83	April 19, 2008	1	2:10	Montreal, Quebec, Canada	
Win	2–0	Jeremiah Constant	TKO (punches)	BodogFight: St. Petersburg	December 16, 2006	1	4:00	St. Petersburg, Russia	
Win	1–0	Jesse Fujarczyk	TKO (punches)	Strikeforce: Tank vs. Buentello	October 7, 2006	1	1:58	Fresno, California, United States	

== NCAA record ==
NCAA Championships Matches
Res.	Record	Opponent	Score	Date	Event
2006 NCAA Championships 4th at HWT
Win	7–3	Bode Ogunwole	5–1	March 18, 2006	2006 NCAA Division I Wrestling Championships
Loss	6–3	Cole Konrad	2–2 TB	March 18, 2006	2006 NCAA Division I Wrestling Championships
Win	6–2	Kirk Nail	4–3	March 18, 2006	2006 NCAA Division I Wrestling Championships
Win	5–2	Paul Weibel	Fall	March 18, 2006	2006 NCAA Division I Wrestling Championships
Win	4–2	Joel Edwards	Fall	March 18, 2006	2006 NCAA Division I Wrestling Championships
2005 NCAA Championships 5th at HWT
Loss	3–2	Greg Wagner	1–4	March 19, 2005	2005 NCAA Division I Wrestling Championships
Loss	3–1	Cole Konrad	2–6	March 19, 2005	2005 NCAA Division I Wrestling Championships
Win	3–0	Matt Feast	4–2	March 19, 2005	2005 NCAA Division I Wrestling Championships
Win	2–0	Marc Allenmang	Major 9–1	March 19, 2005	2005 NCAA Division I Wrestling Championships
Win	1–0	Payam Zarrinpour	5–1	March 19, 2005	2005 NCAA Division I Wrestling Championships

== See also ==
- List of current UFC fighters
- List of male mixed martial artists
- List of Strikeforce alumni

Achievements
Preceded by Brock Lesnar	15th UFC Heavyweight Champion; October 23, 2010 – November 12, 2011	Succeeded by Junior dos Santos
Preceded by Junior dos Santos	17th UFC Heavyweight Champion; December 29, 2012 – June 13, 2015	Succeeded by Fabrício Werdum
