= Mark Bocek =

Canadian mixed martial arts fighter

- Born: October 24, 1981 (age 44); Woodbridge, Ontario, Canada
- Height: 5 ft 9 in (1.75 m)
- Weight: 155 lb (70 kg; 11.1 st)
- Division: Lightweight
- Reach: 75 in (190 cm)
- Team: Tristar Gym
- Rank: Black belt in Brazilian Jiu-Jitsu under João Roque; Black belt in Kempo Karate
- Years active: 2004–2014

Mixed martial arts record
- Total: 17
- Wins: 12
- By knockout: 1
- By submission: 7
- By decision: 4
- Losses: 5
- By knockout: 1
- By submission: 1
- By decision: 3

Other information
- Mixed martial arts record from Sherdog

Mark Bocek (Czech: Boček; born October 24, 1981) is a Canadian retired mixed martial artist who competed in the Lightweight division of the Ultimate Fighting Championship. A professional competitor for ten years from 2004 to 2014, Bocek has also formerly competed for King of the Cage.

== Mixed martial arts career ==
=== Background ===
Bocek holds a Brazilian jiu-jitsu black belt and has been studying the art for two decades. He first studied under Rickson and Renzo Gracie and then moved on to Nova Uniao, where he received his black belt through Joao Roque in December 2003, making him the first Canadian-born black belt in Brazilian jiu-jitsu. Bocek currently trains in BJJ with Marcelo Garcia and also holds a black belt in Kempo Karate.

=== Ultimate Fighting Championship ===
Bocek caught the attention of the UFC when president Dana White and UFC owner Lorenzo Fertitta began training Brazilian jiu-jitsu under his tutelage.

In his UFC debut at UFC 73, Bocek lost to future UFC Lightweight Champion Frankie Edgar via first-round TKO.

After rebounding at UFC 79 with a decision win over Doug Evans, Bocek lost to TUF winner Mac Danzig by submission in the third round.

He fought against Alvin Robinson at UFC 91 on November 16, 2008, and won by submission. His next fight was against David Bielkheden at UFC 97, where he dominated Bielkheden and submitted him by rear naked choke in the first round.

He was expected to face Matt Veach on December 5, 2009, at The Ultimate Fighter 10 Finale until Veach stepped up to fight Frank Edgar as Kurt Pellegrino's replacement. Bocek then fought UFC newcomer Joe Brammer on the same card. He defeated Brammer via first round submission.

Bocek lost a unanimous decision in a close fight to Jim Miller on March 27, 2010, at UFC 111. Despite controlling Miller's position throughout most of the contest and taking him down on multiple occasions, all three judges scored the fight 29-28 for Miller.

Bocek defeated Dustin Hazelett via first round submission on December 11, 2010, at UFC 124.

Bocek faced former WEC Lightweight Champion Benson Henderson on April 30, 2011, at UFC 129. He lost the fight via unanimous decision.

Bocek faced Nik Lentz on December 10, 2011, at UFC 140. He won the fight via unanimous decision after taking down and controlling Lentz all three rounds.

Bocek was expected to face Matt Wiman on April 21, 2012, at UFC 145. However, Wiman was forced from the bout with an injury and was replaced by returning UFC veteran John Alessio. He won via unanimous decision (30–27, 29–28, 30–27).

Bocek faced Rafael dos Anjos on November 17, 2012, at UFC 154. He lost the fight via unanimous decision.

Bocek was expected to fight Michel Prazeres on September 21, 2013, at UFC 165. However, Bocek pulled out due to an injury and was replaced by UFC newcomer Jesse Ronson.

Bocek was expected to face Evan Dunham on April 16, 2014, at The Ultimate Fighter: Nations Finale. However, Dunham pulled out of the bout in the week leading up to the event with an undisclosed injury and was replaced by promotional newcomer Mike De La Torre. Bocek won the fight via split decision.

On August 5, 2014, Bocek announced his retirement from mixed martial arts competition via Twitter.

== Personal life ==
Bocek is a big fan of the Czech rapper Marpo and he uses Marpo songs as his entrance music to his UFC fights.

== Championships and achievements ==
- Ultimate Fighting Championship
  - Submission of the Night (Two times)
  - UFC.com Awards
    - 2010: Ranked #5 Submission of the Year vs. Dustin Hazelett

== Mixed martial arts record ==
Professional record breakdown
17 matches	12 wins	5 losses
By knockout	1	1
By submission	7	1
By decision	4	3

Res.	Record	Opponent	Method	Event	Date	Round	Time	Location	Notes
Win	12–5	Mike De La Torre	Decision (split)	The Ultimate Fighter Nations Finale: Bisping vs. Kennedy	April 16, 2014	3	5:00	Quebec City, Quebec, Canada	
Loss	11–5	Rafael dos Anjos	Decision (unanimous)	UFC 154	November 17, 2012	3	5:00	Montreal, Quebec, Canada	
Win	11–4	John Alessio	Decision (unanimous)	UFC 145	April 21, 2012	3	5:00	Atlanta, Georgia, United States	
Win	10–4	Nik Lentz	Decision (unanimous)	UFC 140	December 10, 2011	3	5:00	Toronto, Ontario, Canada	
Loss	9–4	Benson Henderson	Decision (unanimous)	UFC 129	April 30, 2011	3	5:00	Toronto, Ontario, Canada	
Win	9–3	Dustin Hazelett	Submission (triangle armbar)	UFC 124	December 11, 2010	1	2:33	Montreal, Quebec, Canada	Submission of the Night.
Loss	8–3	Jim Miller	Decision (unanimous)	UFC 111	March 27, 2010	3	5:00	Newark, New Jersey, United States	
Win	8–2	Joe Brammer	Submission (standing rear-naked choke)	The Ultimate Fighter: Heavyweights Finale	December 5, 2009	1	3:36	Las Vegas, Nevada, United States	Submission of the Night.
Win	7–2	David Bielkheden	Submission (rear-naked choke)	UFC 97	April 18, 2009	1	4:57	Montreal, Quebec, Canada	
Win	6–2	Alvin Robinson	Submission (rear-naked choke)	UFC 91	November 15, 2008	3	3:16	Las Vegas, Nevada, United States	
Loss	5–2	Mac Danzig	Submission (rear-naked choke)	UFC 83	April 19, 2008	3	3:48	Montreal, Quebec, Canada	
Win	5–1	Doug Evans	Decision (unanimous)	UFC 79	December 29, 2007	3	5:00	Las Vegas, Nevada, United States	
Loss	4–1	Frankie Edgar	TKO (punches)	UFC 73	July 7, 2007	1	4:55	Sacramento, California, United States	
Win	4–0	Garret Davis	Submission (rear-naked choke)	KOTC: Capital Chaos	March 28, 2007	1	2:35	Hull, Quebec, Canada	
Win	3–0	John Mahlow	Submission (armbar)	KOTC: Freedom Fight	January 20, 2007	1	4:09	Gatineau, Quebec, Canada	
Win	2–0	Kevin Manderson	Submission (rear-naked choke)	APEX: A Night Of Champions	October 14, 2006	1	1:25	Gatineau, Quebec, Canada	
Win	1–0	Mark Colangelo	TKO (injury)	TKO 15: Unstoppable	February 28, 2004	1	5:00	Montreal, Quebec, Canada	
