= Tom DeBlass =

American Brazilian Jiu-Jitsu practitioner and mixed martial arts fighter

Thomas Carroll DeBlass
- Born: May 14, 1982 (age 44); Bayville, New Jersey, USA
- Other names: T-Bone
- Nationality: American
- Height: 5 ft 11 in (1.80 m)
- Weight: 205 lb (93 kg; 14.6 st)
- Division: Middleweight (2012–2013); Light Heavyweight (2010–2012)
- Reach: 73.0 in (185 cm)
- Style: Brazilian jiu-jitsu
- Fighting out of: Forked River, New Jersey
- Team: Ricardo Almeida Jiu-Jitsu; Ocean County Brazilian Jiu-Jitsu
- Rank: 5th degree Black belt in Brazilian Jiu-Jitsu under Ricardo Almeida
- Years active: 2010–2013 (MMA)

Mixed martial arts record
- Total: 11
- Wins: 9
- By knockout: 4
- By submission: 3
- By decision: 2
- Losses: 2
- By decision: 2

Other information
- Mixed martial arts record from Sherdog

Tom DeBlass (born May 14, 1982) is an American Brazilian jiu-jitsu practitioner, submission grappler and mixed martial artist currently signed to ONE Championship. He has competed in the middleweight division for Bellator and the Ultimate Fighting Championship.

== Background ==
DeBlass was a county champion long jumper at Central Regional High School, from which he graduated in 2000. He went on to graduate Monmouth University in 2004 with a degree in Special Education and Elementary Education. DeBlass was known primarily as a Brazilian Jiu-Jitsu competitor winning such titles as Pan American and World Championships. He then fought professionally in Ring Of Combat. In only a year and a half, DeBlass captured two titles and got called up to fight in the UFC. In 2006 DeBlass opened his own Brazilian Jiu-Jitsu Academy "Ocean County Brazilian Jiu-Jitsu". He has been an instructor to notable BJJ practitioners such as Garry Tonon. He is one of the only people in history to win the North American trials 3 times. In November 2017, Tom was elected as a Lacey Township board of education member.

== Mixed martial arts career ==
=== Ultimate Fighting Championship ===
After winning seven straight fights DeBlass was signed by the UFC and made his debut against Cyrille Diabate on one week's notice at UFC on Fuel TV: Gustafsson vs. Silva and lost by Majority Decision.

In his second UFC fight DeBlass dropped down to the Middleweight division to fight against Riki Fukuda at UFC on Fuel TV: Franklin vs. Le He lost by Unanimous Decision.

DeBlass announced his retirement from MMA after the bout with Fukuda stating, "After a lot of talk with my family and coaches, I have decided to retire from fighting and focus on my family, my academy and helping my students to achieve their goals. At this time, I feel it's best for me to give my time to others and spend more time with my family. The drive to keep fighting is not there any longer. I have an amazing academy and feel my students need my full attention."

=== Bellator MMA ===
DeBlass returned from his short-lived retirement and made his Bellator debut against Carlos Brooks at Bellator 95 and won by TKO at the end of the second round after the doctor decided that Brooks could not continue.

DeBlass was scheduled to face former IFL Light Heavyweight Champion Vladimir Matyushenko at Bellator 108 on November 15, 2013. However Matyushenko was forced out of the bout due to a broken hand. DeBlass instead fought fellow UFC veteran Jason Lambert at the event. He won the fight via knockout in the first round.

Tom DeBlass was scheduled to fight Muhammed Lawal on September 5, 2014, at Bellator 123; however, Tom DeBlass suffered a knee injury and was forced off the card. The bout with Lawal was rescheduled for Bellator 131 on November 15, 2014. However, on November 1, it was announced that DeBlass had suffered a cut during training and had to withdraw from the bout.

=== ONE Championship ===
On May 17, 2020, DeBlass came out of retirement and signed with ONE Championship.

In September 2024, DeBlass was appointed as a VP of Submission Grappling for ONE Championship.

== Personal life ==
Tom DeBlass runs his own BJJ and MMA gym and has coached numerous students to a high level, including fellow MMA fighter and ADCC veteran Garry Tonon. DeBlass lives in the Forked River section of Lacey Township, New Jersey.

In November 2021, DeBlass released his biography and it quickly became a best-seller in the martial arts biography category on Amazon. In it, he revealed that he had suffered sexual abuse as a child and explained how he was able to overcome that in order to succeed as a BJJ and MMA competitor. DeBlass has also been open about his usage of Testosterone replacement therapy, and is a strong advocate for it.

DeBlass arranged to have a live discussion with Rener Gracie on April 14, 2023 which would be centred around a Brazilian jiu-jitsu injury lawsuit that Gracie gave expert witness testimony in, resulting in a $46,000,000 payout.

== Philanthropy ==
DeBlass announced in February 2023 that he was working with other gym-owners across the United States in order to open a non-profit anti-bullying initiative, using Brazilian jiu-jitsu.

== Championships and accomplishments ==
=== Mixed martial arts ===
- Ring of Combat
  - ROC Heavyweight Championship (one time)
  - ROC Light Heavyweight Championship (one time)

=== Submission grappling ===
- First person in NJ to win an Adult Black Belt Pan American title
- Second person in NJ history to win ADCC North American Trials
- 2007 Brazilian Jiu-Jitsu National Champion
- 2007 World Championships Mundials 3rd place Brown Belt
- 2007 No Gi World Champion Brown Belt
- 2008 Pan American Champion Brown Belt
- 2009 Abu Dhabi North American Trial Champion
- 2009 Abu Dhabi Combat Club Veteran
- 2009 Bronze Medalist No Gi World Champion Black Belt
- 2013 Grapplers Quest National Champ
- 2013 No Gi Pan American Black Belt Ultra Heavy Champion
- 2013 No Gi Brazilian Jiu-Jitsu World Championship Bronze medal Super Heavy Black Belt Adult
- 2013 Grapplers Quest Worlds Expert Division Ultra heavy Champion
- 2014 Professional Grappling League Super Fight Champion (defeated 370 lb Mark Tarmann)
- 2014 ADCC NY super fight Champion (defeats Babalu Sobral)
- 2014 ADCC North American Champion 99 kg
- 2015 Defended The Good Fight Submission only Heavyweight Championship: 206+ lbs Defeated Rodrigo Correia (Submission 60:56)
- 2015 Conquest Submission series drew Joao Asiss
- 2015 Inducted into NJ Martial Arts hall of fame
- 2015 No Gi Brazilian Jiu-Jitsu World Championship Black Belt Ultra Heavy Masters 1 Bronze medal
- 2015 No Gi Brazilian Jiu-Jitsu World Championship Black Belt Open Class Masters 1 Champion
- 2016 ADCC US Nationals pro absolute champion
- 2016 ADCC North American Trials +99 kg Champion
- 2017 Fight to Win 30 Main Event Winner over Ricco Rodriguez
- 2018 Fight to Win Pro 27 Main Event Winner over Lou Armezzani
- 2019 KASAI Pro Superfight Winner

== Mixed martial arts record ==
Professional record breakdown
11 matches	9 wins	2 losses
By knockout	4	0
By submission	2	0
By decision	3	2

Res.	Record	Opponent	Method	Event	Date	Round	Time	Location	Notes
Win	9–2	Jason Lambert	KO (punch)	Bellator 108	November 15, 2013	1	1:45	Atlantic City, New Jersey, United States	Light Heavyweight bout
Win	8–2	Carlos Brooks	TKO (doctor stoppage)	Bellator 95	April 4, 2013	2	5:00	Atlantic City, New Jersey, United States	Catchweight (188 lbs)
Loss	7–2	Riki Fukuda	Decision (unanimous)	UFC on Fuel TV: Franklin vs. Le	November 10, 2012	3	5:00	Macau, SAR, China	Middleweight debut
Loss	7–1	Cyrille Diabate	Decision (majority)	UFC on Fuel TV: Gustafsson vs. Silva	April 14, 2012	3	5:00	Stockholm, Sweden	Light Heavyweight bout
Win	7–0	Randy Smith	Submission (heel hook)	Ring of Combat 39	February 10, 2012	1	0:41	Atlantic City, New Jersey, United States	Won ROC Heavyweight title
Win	6–0	David Tkeshelashvili	Decision (unanimous)	Ring of Combat 38	November 18, 2011	3	5:00	Atlantic City, New Jersey, United States	
Win	5–0	Mike Stewart	TKO (punches)	Ring of Combat 37	September 9, 2011	1	3:07	Atlantic City, New Jersey, United States	
Win	4–0	Sean Salmon	Submission (achilles lock)	Ring of Combat 35	April 8, 2011	1	0:57	Atlantic City, New Jersey, United States	
Win	3–0	Mitch Whitesel	Decision (unanimous)	Ring of Combat 33	December 3, 2010	3	4:00	Atlantic City, New Jersey, United States	
Win	2–0	Tom Velasquez	TKO (punches)	Ring of Combat 31	September 24, 2010	2	0:50	Atlantic City, New Jersey, United States	
Win	1–0	J.A. Dudley	Decision (unanimous)	Ring of Combat 30	June 11, 2010	2	4:00	Atlantic City, New Jersey, United States	
