= UFC 145 =

Mixed martial arts event in 2012

UFC 145: Jones vs. Evans
- The poster for UFC 145: Jones vs. Evans
- Promotion: Ultimate Fighting Championship
- Date: April 21, 2012
- Venue: Philips Arena
- City: Atlanta, Georgia
- Attendance: 15,545
- Total gate: $2,200,000
- Total purse: $1,501,000

Event chronology
UFC on Fuel TV: Gustafsson vs. Silva	UFC 145: Jones vs. Evans	UFC on Fox: Diaz vs. Miller

UFC 145: Jones vs. Evans was a mixed martial arts event held by the Ultimate Fighting Championship. It was the 9th UFC event of the year, and took place on April 21, 2012, at the Philips Arena in Atlanta, Georgia.

== Background ==
The event was initially set to take place on March 24, 2012, in Montreal, Canada. However, in mid-January 2012, it was announced that the event was shelved due to inability to secure a championship fight, stemming from "scheduling complications". In early February it was reported that the event would take place in Atlanta, Georgia on April 21.

The headline fight at UFC 145 was a UFC Light Heavyweight Championship contest between champion Jon Jones and challenger Rashad Evans. Jones and Evans are former teammates at Jackson's MMA, under the tutelage of coach Greg Jackson. Evans was one of Jackson's most successful fighters, and was a core member of his training camp. Being in the same weightclass, and a long-time member of Jackson's MMA, the UFC veteran Evans naturally took the young and inexperienced fighter Jones under his wing. In the months leading to UFC 145, the two engaged in a bitter and public feud.

At UFC 128 (March 19, 2011), Evans was expected to fight for the Light Heavyweight title against then-champion Mauricio Rua. However, a knee injury forced Evans off of the card. Needing an opponent for Rua at UFC 128, the UFC offered Jones the match. Jones accepted, with Evans' blessing. Shortly afterwards, Jones stated in an interview with MMA reporter Ariel Helwani he would be willing to fight Evans if the UFC asked. Evans felt betrayed by his teammate and friend, starting a feud which forced Evans to leave Jackson's MMA. Evans then joined the Imperial Athletics camp in Florida.

Since UFC 128, Jones had defended his championship twice against former champions (Quinton Jackson and Lyoto Machida). Evans had defeated former champion Tito Ortiz, as well as Phil Davis, to setting the stage for "the most anticipated Light Heavyweight bout since Chuck Liddell fought Tito Ortiz". This was the third scheduled contest between the two. The first match was scrapped due to a hand injury to Jones, the second because of a thumb injury to Evans.

UFC Primetime returned to promote the main event.

Matt Wiman was expected to face Mark Bocek at this event, but was forced off the card with an injury and replaced by the returning John Alessio.

John Makdessi weighed in two pounds over the Lightweight limit. He was fined 20 percent of his purse, and his fight with Anthony Njokuani became a catchweight bout at 158 lb.

== Event ==
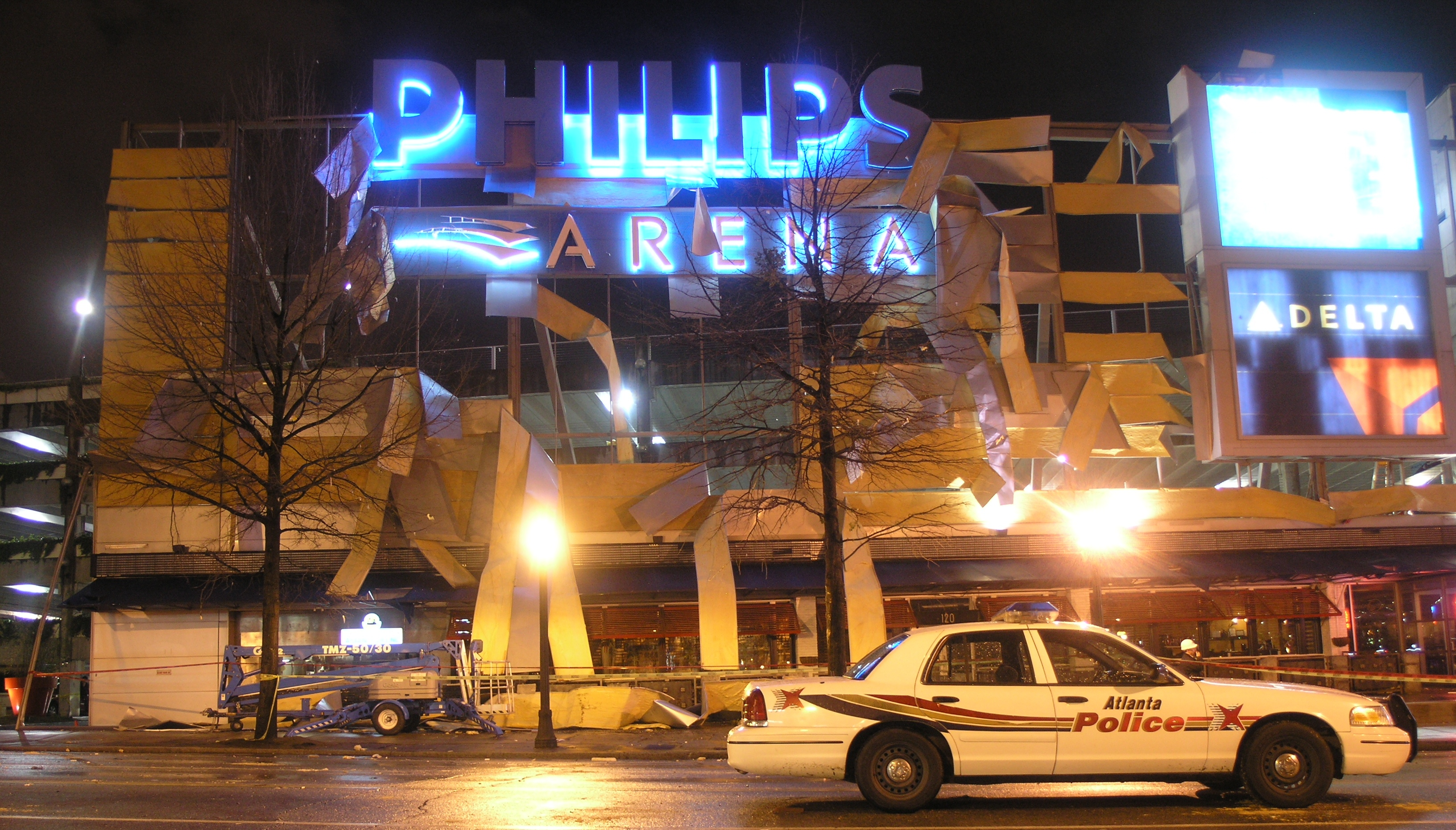
15,545 fans filled Philips Arena to witness UFC 145 and the grudge match between Jones and Evans.

The event consisted of twelve mixed martial arts bouts, sanctioned by the Georgia Athletic and Entertainment Commission and contested under the Unified Rules of Mixed Martial Arts. All bouts were scheduled for three five-minute rounds except for the main event championship match between Jones and Evans, which was five five-minute rounds. Two of the preliminary fights were streamed on Facebook, and four were televised on FX. Attendance was 15,545, with a gate of $2,200,000. The pay-per-view buyrate was 700,000.

=== Preliminary card ===
All but one of the event's six preliminary fights went the full three rounds, ending in a decision.

The first bout of the evening was between Maximo Blanco and Marcus Brimage. After three uneventful rounds between the hesitant fighters, the judges scored the contest 29–28 Blanco, 30–27 Brimage, and 29–28 for the winner by split decision, Marcus Brimage. Immediately after the fight concluded, Blanco executed a backflip, which was mimicked by Brimage. The two fighters then engaged in an impromptu backflip competition to the delight of the fans.

In the second match, Keith Wisniewski took on UFC newcomer Chris Clements. In the first round, Wisniewski clinched and dragged Clements to the mat, and passed to full mount. Clements regained half guard as Wisniewski landed hard shots. With two minutes left in the round, referee Fernando Yamasaki issued a controversial stand-up order. Following the stand-up, Clements dropped Wisniewski with a turning kick to the body. Wisniewski recovered and the two traded punches shortly before the round ended. After a close second round, Clements controlled the third, landing powerful right hand punches and dropping Wisniewski with a knee. He closed out the fight with strong ground-and-pound as time expired, sending the fight to the judges for a decision. The judges scored the bout 29–28 Clements, 29–28 Wisniewski, and 30–27 for the winner by split decision, Chris Clements.

In the third bout, Mac Danzig fought Efraín Escudero. In the first round, Escudero unsuccessfully attempted a heel hook submission. Danzig proceeded to take Escudero's back and attempt a rear-naked choke in one motion, but Escudero escaped. After three close rounds, the bout went to a decision. The judges scored it 30–27, 30–27, and 29–28 for Mac Danzig, the winner by unanimous decision.

The fourth match pitted Anthony Njokuani against taekwondo fighter John Makdessi. The first round was defined by kicks. While Makdessi was the aggressor, Njokuani landed more kicks. In the second round, Njokuani continued to use his reach advantage to land kicks and punches. Makdessi could not get his timing down and Njokuani continued to counter. The third round was more of the same until the horn sounded, and all three judges scored the bout 30–27 for the winner by unanimous decision, Anthony Njokuani.

In the fifth fight, Stephen Thompson faced Matt Brown. In the first two rounds, Thompson had success striking on the feet but had trouble stopping Brown's takedowns. Thompson started the second round strong, wobbling Brown with kicks and punches. Brown then knocked Thompson down with an elbow and, from the top, landed elbows and punches which opened a cut on Thompson's face. Brown dominated the third round by securing a mounted crucifix and then a mounted triangle. Brown finished out the fight by pummeling a bloody Thompson until the horn sounded. The judges scored the bout 30–27, 29–27, and 30–27 for Matt Brown, the winner by unanimous decision.

In the sixth bout of the evening, heavyweights Travis Browne and Chad Griggs squared off. In the first round, Browne secured a takedown and landed in half guard. Browne easily transitioned into the full mount position and quickly secured an arm triangle choke. Griggs tapped out at 2:29 of the first round, in the first finish of the night. The UFC awarded Browne with the "Submission of the Night" bonus award for his performance.

=== Main card ===
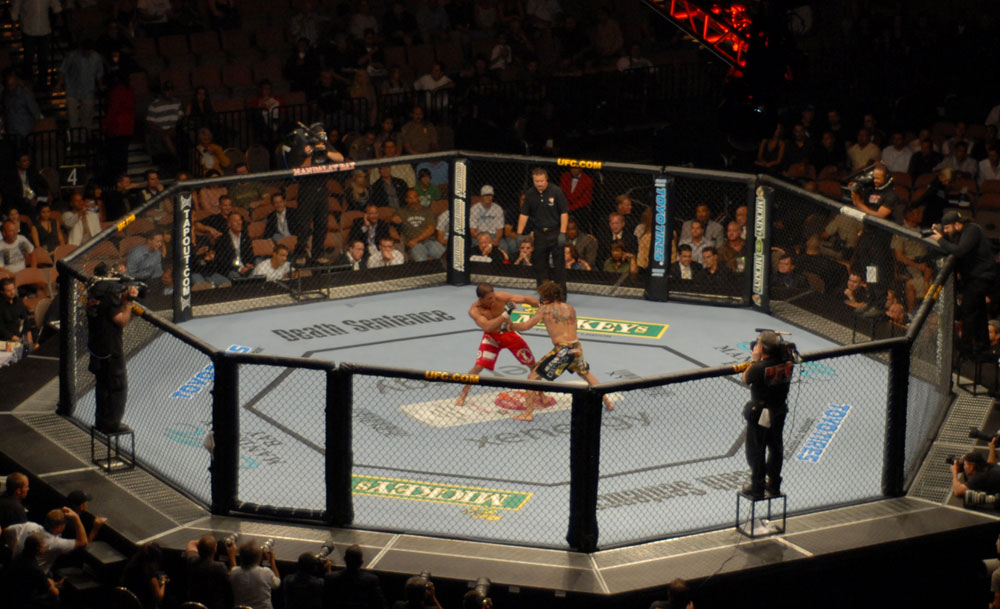
Shot of The Octagon from UFC 74: Clay Guida vs. Marcus Aurelio

The first bout on the main card was a lightweight match between Mark Bocek and John Alessio. Bocek started strong and dominated the first round after a takedown. From there, he landed several big elbows. He continued to grapple and soften up Alessio with punches until the end of the round. Both men slowed down in the second round, but Bocek controlled the action. In the final round, Bocek transitioned to full back mount from a body triangle on Alessio. However, Bocek failed to fully apply a rear-naked choke, and Alessio escaped. Neither fighter could finish the fight before time ended, and the fight went to a decision. The three judges scored the bout 30–27, 29–28, and 30–27 for Mark Bocek, the winner by unanimous decision.

The next fight was between two featherweight fighters, Mark Hominick and Eddie Yagin. Hominick survived the first round after being knocked down by a right uppercut/left hook combination from Yagin. At the start of the second round, Hominick looked less tired than Yagin. Hominick landed solid punches until Yagin landed another big shot of his own. Yagin followed up with hard shots on the ground but, once again, Hominick recovered. Hominick peppered Yagin in the third round with hooks and jabs, while Yagin threw power shots. Hominick continued to land punches throughout the round, and both fighter's faces were bruised and bloody by the end. The fight ended in a split decision. The first judge scored the bout 29–28 for Yagin. The second scored it 29–28 for Hominick. The third scored it 29–28 in favor of the winner, Eddie Yagin. This fight earned both men $65,000 "Fight of the Night" bonus awards.

== Results ==
Main card
Weight class				Method	Round	Time	Notes
Light Heavyweight	Jon Jones (c)	def.	Rashad Evans	Decision (unanimous) (49–46, 49–46, 50–45)	5	5:00	(Note: For the UFC Light Heavyweight Championship.)
Welterweight	Rory MacDonald	def.	Che Mills	TKO (punches)	2	2:20
Heavyweight	Ben Rothwell	def.	Brendan Schaub	KO (punches)	1	1:10
Bantamweight	Michael McDonald	def.	Miguel Torres	KO (punches)	1	3:18
Featherweight	Eddie Yagin	def.	Mark Hominick	Decision (split) (29–28, 28–29, 29–28)	3	5:00
Lightweight	Mark Bocek	def.	John Alessio	Decision (unanimous) (30–27, 29–28, 30–27)	3	5:00
Preliminary card (FX)
Heavyweight	Travis Browne	def.	Chad Griggs	Submission (arm-triangle choke)	1	2:29	(Note: This bout aired on the broadcast following the Jones vs Evans bout.)
Welterweight	Matt Brown	def.	Stephen Thompson	Decision (unanimous) (30–27, 29–27, 30–27)	3	5:00
Catchweight (158 lb)	Anthony Njokuani	def.	John Makdessi	Decision (unanimous) (30–27, 30–27, 30–27)	3	5:00	(Note: Makdessi missed weight.)
Lightweight	Mac Danzig	def.	Efraín Escudero	Decision (unanimous) (30–27, 30–27, 29–28)	3	5:00
Preliminary card (Facebook)
Welterweight	Chris Clements	def.	Keith Wisniewski	Decision (split) (29–28, 28–29, 30–27)	3	5:00
Featherweight	Marcus Brimage	def.	Maximo Blanco	Decision (split) (28–29, 30–27, 29–28)	3	5:00

== Bonus awards ==
The following fighters received $65,000 bonuses.

- Fight of the Night: Mark Hominick vs. Eddie Yagin
- Knockout of the Night: Ben Rothwell
- Submission of the Night: Travis Browne

== Reported payout ==
The following is the reported payout to the fighters as reported to the Georgia Athletic and Entertainment Commission. It does not include sponsor money and also does not include the UFC's traditional "fight night" bonuses.

- Jon Jones: $400,000 (no win bonus) def. Rashad Evans: $300,000
- Rory MacDonald: $36,000 (includes $18,000 win bonus) def. Che Mills: $12,000
- Ben Rothwell: $104,000 (includes $52,000 win bonus) def. Brendan Schaub: $14,000
- Michael McDonald: $16,000 (includes $8,000 win bonus) def. Miguel Torres: $32,000
- Eddie Yagin: $12,000 (includes $6,000 win bonus) def. Mark Hominick: $17,000
- Mark Bocek: $46,000 (includes $23,000 win bonus) def. John Alessio: $10,000
- Travis Browne: $24,000 (includes $12,000 win bonus) def. Chad Griggs: $27,000
- Matt Brown: $36,000 (includes $18,000 win bonus) def. Stephen Thompson: $8,000
- Anthony Njokuani: $24,000 (includes $12,000 win bonus) def. John Makdessi: $12,000
- Mac Danzig: $54,000 (includes $27,000 win bonus) def. Efrain Escudero: $10,000
- Chris Clements: $12,000 (includes $6,000 win bonus) def. Keith Wisniewski: $10,000
- Marcus Brimage: $16,000 (includes $8,000 win bonus) def. Maximo Blanco: $13,000

== See also ==
- List of UFC events
- 2012 in UFC
