= UFC 153 =

UFC mixed martial arts event in 2012

UFC 153: Silva vs. Bonnar
- The poster for UFC 153: Silva vs. Bonnar
- Promotion: Ultimate Fighting Championship
- Date: October 13, 2012
- Venue: HSBC Arena
- City: Rio de Janeiro, Brazil
- Attendance: 16,844
- Total gate: $2.5–$2.6 million
- Buyrate: 410,000

Event chronology
| UFC on FX: Browne vs. Bigfoot | UFC 153: Silva vs. Bonnar | UFC on Fuel TV: Franklin vs. Le |

UFC 153: Silva vs. Bonnar was a mixed martial arts pay-per-view event held by the Ultimate Fighting Championship on October 13, 2012, at the HSBC Arena in Rio de Janeiro, Brazil.

== Background ==
Vitor Belfort was expected to face Alan Belcher at the event. However, Belfort was pulled from the bout to face Light Heavyweight Champion Jon Jones on September 22, 2012 at UFC 152. Belcher also was forced to drop out of the card due to a spinal fracture.

After having their first fight end in a no contest due to an eye poke in the first round, a rematch between Phil Davis and Wagner Prado was briefly linked to UFC on FX: Browne vs. Bigfoot and then scheduled for this event.

Quinton Jackson was scheduled to face Glover Teixeira at the event. However, Jackson pulled out of the bout citing an injury, and was replaced by Fabio Maldonado. Former UFC Light Heavyweight Champion Rashad Evans was offered the fight with Teixeira but turned it down due to the short notice.

Geronimo dos Santos was scheduled to fight Gabriel Gonzaga at this event. However, dos Santos pulled out of the bout after a blood test showed that he had antibodies for Hepatitis B. With no time to find a suitable replacement, Gonzaga was pulled from the card.

Erik Koch was expected to face UFC Featherweight Champion José Aldo in a title fight at this event, but on August 31, 2012, Koch was forced to pull out due to injury. Former UFC Lightweight Champion Frankie Edgar had agreed to step in for Koch and fight Aldo for the Featherweight title. However, on September 11, Aldo was also forced to pull out of the event with a foot injury after being involved in a motorcycle accident.

On September 12, 2012, UFC officials announced that UFC Middleweight Champion Anderson Silva and former The Ultimate Fighter star Stephan Bonnar would fight in the main event. Silva was a massive favorite going into the bout, which was a three-round fight. Although all main event fights have been five-round affairs since UFC 138, UFC 153 was an exception due to the short notice, along with UFC 234, when Robert Whittaker pulled out of the event a few hours prior.

On November 4, 2012, UFC announced Bonnar had tested positive for drostanolone, and Dave Herman for marijuana. Both fighters were suspended.

== Results ==
Main Card
| Weight class | | | | Method | Round | Time | Notes |
|---|---|---|---|---|---|---|---|
| Light Heavyweight | Anderson Silva | def. | Stephan Bonnar | TKO (knee to the body and punches) | 1 | 4:40 |
| Heavyweight | Antônio Rodrigo Nogueira | def. | Dave Herman | Submission (armbar) | 2 | 4:31 |
| Light Heavyweight | Glover Teixeira | def. | Fabio Maldonado | TKO (doctor stoppage) | 2 | 5:00 |
| Welterweight | Jon Fitch | def. | Erick Silva | Decision (unanimous) (30–27, 29–28, 29–28) | 3 | 5:00 |
| Light Heavyweight | Phil Davis | def. | Wagner Prado | Submission (anaconda choke) | 2 | 4:29 |
| Welterweight | Demian Maia | def. | Rick Story | Submission (neck crank) | 1 | 2:30 |
Preliminary Card (FX)
| Featherweight | Rony Jason | def. | Sam Sicilia | TKO (punches) | 2 | 4:16 |
| Lightweight | Gleison Tibau | def. | Francisco Trinaldo | Decision (unanimous) (29–28, 29–28, 29–28) | 3 | 5:00 |
| Featherweight | Diego Brandao | def. | Joey Gambino | Decision (unanimous) (30–27, 30–27, 30–27) | 3 | 5:00 |
| Welterweight | Sérgio Moraes | def. | Renée Forte | Submission (rear-naked choke) | 3 | 3:10 |
Preliminary Card (Facebook)
| Middleweight | Chris Camozzi | def. | Luiz Cané | Decision (unanimous) (29–28, 29–28, 29–28) | 3 | 5:00 |
| Lightweight | Cristiano Marcello | def. | Reza Madadi | Decision (split) (28–29, 29–28, 30–27) | 3 | 5:00 |

== Bonus awards ==
The following fighters received $70,000 bonuses.

- Fight of the Night: Jon Fitch vs. Erick Silva
- Knockout of the Night: Rony Jason
- Submission of the Night: Antônio Rodrigo Nogueira

== See also ==
- List of UFC events
- 2012 in UFC
