= 2026 in Cage Warriors =

Mixed martial arts events

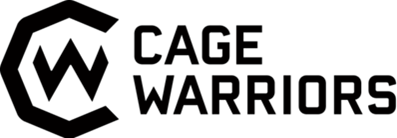

Information
- First date: February 21, 2026

Events

Fights

Chronology
| 2025 in Cage Warriors | 2026 in Cage Warriors | 2027 in Cage Warriors |

The year 2026 is the 26th year in the history of Cage Warriors, a mixed martial arts promotion based in England.

== List of events ==
| # | Event | Date | Arena | Location |
|---|---|---|---|---|
| 1 | Cage Warriors 200 | Feb 21, 2026 | Simmonscourt RDS | Dublin, Ireland |
| 2 | Cage Warriors 201 | Mar 13, 2026 | BEC Arena | Manchester, England |
| 3 | Cage Warriors 202 | Mar 14, 2026 | BEC Arena | Manchester, England |
| 4 | Cage Warriors 203 | Mar 20, 2026 | Indigo at The O2 | London, England |
| 5 | Cage Warriors 204 | Apr 11, 2026 | PalaPellicone | Rome, Italy |
| 6 | Cage Warriors 205 | Apr 25, 2026 | Braehead Arena | Glasgow, Scotland |
| 7 | Cage Warriors 206 | Jun 19, 2026 | BEC Arena | Manchester, England |
| 8 | Cage Warriors 207 | Jun 20, 2026 | BEC Arena | Manchester, England |
| 9 | Cage Warriors 208 | Jun 27, 2026 | Indigo at The O2 | London, England |
| 10 | Cage Warriors 209 | Jul 4, 2026 | Vertu Motors Arena | Newcastle, England |
| 11 | Cage Warriors 210 | Sep 26, 2026 | Shelbourne Hall | Dublin, Ireland |
| 12 | Cage Warriors 211 | Oct 17, 2026 | PalaPellicone | Rome, Italy |
| 13 | Cage Warriors 212 | Nov 7, 2026 | BBC Studioworks Television Centre | London, England |
| 14 | Cage Warriors 213 | Nov 14, 2026 | BBC Studioworks Television Centre | London, England |
| 15 | Cage Warriors 214 | Nov 27, 2026 | BEC Arena | Manchester, England |
| 16 | Cage Warriors 215 | Nov 28, 2026 | BEC Arena | Manchester, England |
| 17 | Cage Warriors 216 | Dec 5, 2026 | Vertu Motors Arena | Newcastle, England |

== Cage Warriors 200 ==
Cage Warriors 200: Dublin
- Promotion: Cage Warriors
- Date: February 21, 2026
- Venue: Simmonscourt RDS
- City: Dublin, Ireland

Cage Warriors 200: Dublin was a mixed martial arts event promoted by Cage Warriors that took place on February 21, 2026, in Dublin, Ireland.

=== Background ===
A Cage Warriors Featherweight Championship bout between current champion Solomon Simon and Nik Bagley headlined this event. They were originally scheduled to meet for the vacant title at Cage Warriors 196 in November 2025, but Bagley withdrew from the bout for unknown reasons.

A Cage Warriors Middleweight Championship bout between current champion Dario Bellandi and Paddy McCorry took place at the co-main event.

=== Bonus awards ===
The following fighters received bonuses.

- Fight of the Night (£5,000): Tanio Pagliariccio vs. Ger Harris
- Performance of the Night ($10,000): Leon Hill and Adam Darby

=== Results ===
Main card (UFC Fight Pass)
| Weight class | | | | Method | Round | Time | Notes |
|---|---|---|---|---|---|---|---|
| Featherweight | Nik Bagley | def. | Solomon Simon (c) | Decision (unanimous) (50–45, 50–45, 49–46) | 5 | 5:00 | (Note: For the Cage Warriors Featherweight Championship.) |
| Middleweight | Paddy McCorry | def. | Dario Bellandi (c) | TKO (punches) | 1 | 2:28 | (Note: For the Cage Warriors Middleweight Championship.) |
| Welterweight | Leon Hill | def. | Aldo Pereira Aguiar | TKO (knee and punches) | 2 | 3:16 |
| Flyweight | Tanio Pagliariccio | def. | Ger Harris | Decision (split) (29–28, 28–29, 30–27) | 3 | 5:00 |
| Welterweight | Maximus Lally | def. | Alexandre Junior | Submission (rear-naked choke) | 1 | 2:05 |
| Catchweight (175 lb) | Adam Darby | def. | Thiago Habib | Submission (ninja choke) | 1 | 1:22 |
Preliminary card (YouTube / UFC Fight Pass)
| Featherweight | Alexander O'Sullivan | def. | Scott Harvey | TKO (punches) | 1 | 4:37 |
| Catchweight (163 lb) | Conor McCarthy | def. | Edilson Souza da Silva | TKO (punches) | 1 | 3:44 |
| Featherweight | Keith Keogh | def. | Gabriel Ramos | TKO (punch) | 3 | 2:16 |
| Catchweight (177 lb) | Andreeas Binder | def. | Oton Jasse | TKO (punches) | 2 | 4:14 |
| Featherweight | Damien McKenna | def. | Pedro Silva | KO (punch to the body) | 3 | 4:36 | (Note: Silva missed weight (146.9 lb).) |
| Catchweight (150 lb) | Lewis Byrne | def. | Dylan Logan | TKO (elbows) | 1 | 4:36 |
| Lightweight | Kenny Mokhonoana | def. | Grant Ogborne | Decision (unanimous) (29–28, 29–28, 29–28) | 3 | 5:00 | (Note: Mokhonoana missed weight (156.7 lb).) |
| Featherweight | Alex Keogh | def. | Taylor Sullivan | Submission (rear-naked choke) | 1 | 0:24 |

== Cage Warriors 201 ==
Cage Warriors 201: Unplugged
- Promotion: Cage Warriors
- Date: March 13, 2026
- Venue: BEC Arena
- City: Manchester, England

Cage Warriors 201: Unplugged was a mixed martial arts event promoted by Cage Warriors that took place on March 13, 2026, in Manchester, England.

=== Background ===
A featherweight bout between Aiden Lee and promotional newcomer Inglesson de Lara headlined the event.

=== Results ===
Main card (UFC Fight Pass)
| Weight class | | | | Method | Round | Time | Notes |
|---|---|---|---|---|---|---|---|
| Featherweight | Aiden Lee | def. | Inglesson de Lara | Submission (rear-naked choke) | 1 | 3:36 |
| Catchweight (161 lb) | Konstantinos Ntelis | def. | Leon Aliu | KO (punch) | 1 | 1:08 |
| Featherweight | Matthew Elliott | def. | Jake McHugh | KO (punches) | 1 | 0:59 |
| Bantamweight | Damiano Scogna | def. | Lucas Rodrigues | TKO (punches) | 2 | 2:01 |
| Light Heavyweight | Danny Hartwell | def. | Branden Guest | TKO (punches) | 3 | 4:43 |
| Flyweight | Angelo Maria Terenzio | def. | Damien McGuigan | Submission (heel hook) | 1 | 3:39 |
Preliminary card (UFC Fight Pass)
| Catchweight (139 lb) | Armand Herczeg | def. | Percy Herrera | TKO (knee to the body and punches) | 3 | 1:57 |
| Welterweight | Roan Crocker | def. | Dara Ward | Submission (rear-naked choke) | 1 | 1:26 |
| Catchweight (118 lb) | Lindsey Payne | def. | Levi Steedman | TKO (elbows) | 2 | 2:57 |

== Cage Warriors 202 ==
Cage Warriors 202: Manchester
- Promotion: Cage Warriors
- Date: March 14, 2026
- Venue: BEC Arena
- City: Manchester, England

Cage Warriors 202: Manchester was a mixed martial arts event promoted by Cage Warriors that took place on March 14, 2026, in Manchester, England.

=== Background ===
A Cage Warriors Lightweight Championship title unification bout between current champion Samuel Silva and interim champion Omiel Brown headlined the event.

=== Bonus awards ===
The following fighters received $5,000 bonus.

- Performance of the Night: Omiel Brown

=== Results ===
Main card (UFC Fight Pass)
| Weight class | | | | Method | Round | Time | Notes |
|---|---|---|---|---|---|---|---|
| Lightweight | Omiel Brown (ic) | def. | Samuel Silva (c) | TKO (punches) | 3 | 0:56 | (Note: For the Cage Warriors Lightweight Championship.) |
| Bantamweight | Nathan Fletcher | def. | Thyago Silva | TKO (punches) | 1 | 1:27 |
| Lightweight | Ieuan Davies | def. | Michael Pagani | Decision (unanimous) (30–27, 29–28, 29–28) | 3 | 5:00 |
| Lightweight | Adam Cullen | def. | Loibe Neto | Decision (unanimous) (30–27, 30–27, 30–27) | 3 | 5:00 |
| Lightweight | Shay Ingram | def. | Torpal Merjoev | Decision (unanimous) (30–27, 30–27, 30–27) | 3 | 5:00 | (Note: Ingram missed weight (156.3 lb).) |
| Lightweight | George Staines | def. | Marcelo Marques | Decision (unanimous) (30–27, 30–27, 30–27) | 3 | 5:00 |
Preliminary card (YouTube / UFC Fight Pass)
| Featherweight | Alexis Tsarmantidis | def. | Oliver Tero | Decision (unanimous) (30–27, 30–27, 30–27) | 3 | 5:00 |
| Flyweight | Connor Wilson | def. | Kierandip Singh Sahota | Decision (unanimous) (30–27, 30–27, 30–27) | 3 | 5:00 |
| Bantamweight | Pietro Mochetti | def. | Sam Kelly | Decision (unanimous) (30–27, 29–28, 29–28) | 3 | 5:00 |
| Flyweight | Joe Fields | def. | Iago Silva | TKO (punches) | 1 | 1:08 |
| Bantamweight | Jack McCloughlin | def. | Ramon Costa | TKO (elbows) | 2 | 2:54 |
| Flyweight | Sheldon Ryan | def. | Nathanael Woods | Decision (unanimous) (29–28, 30–27, 30–27) | 3 | 5:00 |
| Welterweight | Chris Morris | def. | Mariusz Mikołajewski | TKO (punches) | 2 | 4:11 |
| Bantamweight | Alistair Fitzharris | def. | Ryan Hewitt | Decision (unanimous) (29–28, 30–27, 30–27) | 3 | 5:00 |

== Cage Warriors 203 ==
Cage Warriors 203: London
- Promotion: Cage Warriors
- Date: March 20, 2026
- Venue: Indigo at The O2
- City: London, England

Cage Warriors 203: London was a mixed martial arts event promoted by Cage Warriors that took place on March 20, 2026, in London, England.

=== Background ===
A Cage Warriors Flyweight Championship bout between current champion Nicolas Leblond and Jawany Scott was scheduled to headline the event. However, the bout was removed from the event due to Leblond's injury.

A Cage Warriors Bantamweight Championship bout for the vacant title between Ollie Sarwa and Weslley Maia was scheduled to serve as the co-main event, but the bout was promoted to main event status after originally headliner removed.

=== Results ===
Main card (UFC Fight Pass)
| Weight class | | | | Method | Round | Time | Notes |
|---|---|---|---|---|---|---|---|
| Bantamweight | Weslley Maia | def. | Ollie Sarwa | Decision (unanimous) (48–47, 48–47, 48–47) | 5 | 5:00 | (Note: For the vacant Cage Warriors Bantamweight Championship.) |
| Lightweight | Jordan Vucenic | def. | Daniel Konrad | KO (punches) | 1 | 1:31 |
| Catchweight (175 lb) | Manuel del Valle | def. | Italo Gomes | TKO (punches) | 2 | 4:44 |
| Lightweight | Stefano Catacoli | def. | Tariq Pell | Decision (unanimous) (30–27, 30–27, 30–27) | 3 | 5:00 |
| Middleweight | Leon Naumann | def. | Steven Hill | Submission (triangle choke) | 1 | 1:28 |
| Catchweight (163 lb) | Marin Vetrila | def. | Yusuf Ali-Taleb | KO (punch) | 2 | 4:41 | (Note: Ali-Taleb missed weight (167.7 lb).) |
Preliminary card (YouTube / UFC Fight Pass)
| Catchweight (150 lb) | Connor Patterson | def. | Georgios Daskalakis | Submission (rear-naked choke) | 1 | 1:29 |
| Lightweight | Cameron Stewart | def. | Valentino Greco | Submission (guillotine choke) | 1 | 1:04 |
| Lightweight | Christian Soda | def. | Callum Haughian | TKO (knees and punches) | 1 | 1:13 |
| Welterweight | Joe Middleton | def. | George McManus | Submission (Japanese necktie) | 1 | 2:53 | (Note: Middleton missed weight (172.3 lb).) |
| Featherweight | Victor Yeo | def. | Harry Shaw | Decision (unanimous) (29–28, 30–27, 30–27) | 3 | 5:00 |

== Cage Warriors 204 ==
Cage Warriors 204: Rome
- Promotion: Cage Warriors
- Date: April 11, 2026
- Venue: PalaPellicone
- City: Rome, Italy

Cage Warriors 204: Rome was a mixed martial arts event promoted by Cage Warriors that took place on April 11, 2026, in Rome, Italy.

=== Background ===
A bantamweight bout between Francesco Nuzzi and Manoel Silva headlined the event.

=== Results ===
Main card (UFC Fight Pass)
| Weight class | | | | Method | Round | Time | Notes |
|---|---|---|---|---|---|---|---|
| Bantamweight | Francesco Nuzzi | vs. | Manoel Silva | No Contest (accidental knee to groin) | 1 | 3:37 | (Note: Accidental knee to the groin rendered Silva unable to continue.) |
| Heavyweight | Mauro Cerilli | def. | Mamadou Lamine Sene | Decision (unanimous) (29–28, 29–28, 29–28) | 3 | 5:00 |
| Welterweight | Khadim Dia | def. | Christopher Bajo | Decision (unanimous) (29–28, 29–28, 29–28) | 3 | 5:00 |
| Featherweight | Luca Borando | def. | Caique Araujo | KO (punch) | 2 | 2:50 |
| Lightweight | Diego Visanzay | def. | Simone Patrizi | Decision (split) (29–28, 28–29, 29–28) | 3 | 5:00 | (Note: Visanzay missed weight (156.5 lb).) |
| Featherweight | Giuseppe Mastrogiacomo | def. | Erick Washington | KO (flying knee and punch) | 2 | 4:13 |
Preliminary card (YouTube / UFC Fight Pass)
| Welterweight | Andrea Kabali | def. | Nicolò Solli | Decision (unanimous) (30–27, 30–27, 30–27) | 3 | 5:00 |
| Bantamweight | Alexandros Moumtzis | def. | Dylan Hazan | Submission (omoplata) | 1 | 4:08 | (Note: Moumtzis missed weight (137.1 lb).) |
| Lightweight | Christian Soda | def. | Niko Ceraglia | TKO (punches) | 1 | 3:30 |
| Catchweight (160 lb) | Gianluca Rocca | def. | Manuel Lancioli | TKO (punches) | 1 | 0:59 |
| Middleweight | George Smith | def. | Mario Mingaj | Submission (anaconda choke) | 1 | 2:25 |
| Featherweight | Lorenzo De Nigris | def. | Francesco Tumminello | Submission (rear-naked choke) | 2 | 1:04 |
| Bantamweight | Enrico Di Gangi | def. | Claudio Iancu | Submission (arm-triangle choke) | 1 | 1:39 |
| Bantamweight | Tommy Brunning | def. | Pierluigi De Prospo | Submission (rear-naked choke) | 2 | 4:38 |

== Cage Warriors 205 ==
Cage Warriors 205: Glasgow
- Promotion: Cage Warriors
- Date: April 25, 2026
- Venue: Braehead Arena
- City: Glasgow, Scotland

Cage Warriors 205: Glasgow was a mixed martial arts event promoted by Cage Warriors that took place on April 25, 2026, in Glasgow, Scotland.

=== Background ===
A Cage Warriors Welterweight Championship title unification bout between current champion Justin Burlinson and interim champion Sean Clancy Jr. was scheduled to headline the event. However, Burlinson withdrew during fight day due to an injury and the bout was postponed. As a results, a featherweight bout between Aidan Stephen and Joshua Abraham served as the new main event instead.

=== Results ===
Main card (UFC Fight Pass)
| Weight class | | | | Method | Round | Time | Notes |
|---|---|---|---|---|---|---|---|
| Featherweight | Aidan Stephen | def. | Joshua Abraham | Decision (unanimous) (30–27, 29–28, 29–28) | 3 | 5:00 |
| Catchweight (140 lb) | Jack Foote | def. | Eoin McDonald | Submission (rear-naked choke) | 2 | 4:36 |
| Featherweight | Damon Donald | def. | Leon Armes | Decision (unanimous) (29–28, 29–28, 30–27) | 3 | 5:00 |
| Light Heavyweight | Norbert Pietrzak | def. | Michael Tchamou | KO (punch) | 1 | 2:49 |
| Featherweight | Jamie McGowan | def. | Taylor Sullivan | TKO (leg kicks and punches) | 3 | 3:00 |
Preliminary card (YouTube / UFC Fight Pass)
| Welterweight | Senan Coakley | def. | Lewis Urquhart | Decision (unanimous) (30–27, 30–27, 30–27) | 3 | 5:00 |
| Catchweight (132 lb) | Igor Wojtas | def. | Leonardo de Oliveira | Decision (unanimous) (30–27, 30–27, 30–27) | 3 | 5:00 | (Note: de Oliveira missed weight (133.5 lb).) |
| Flyweight | Aaron Towns | def. | Gary Priestly | TKO (knee to the body and punches) | 1 | 3:24 |
| Middleweight | Graham Sheehan | def. | Geoff Pavey | Submission (rear-naked choke) | 1 | 3:07 |

== Cage Warriors 206 ==
Cage Warriors 206: Unplugged
- Promotion: Cage Warriors
- Date: June 19, 2026
- Venue: BEC Arena
- City: Manchester, England

Cage Warriors 206: Unplugged was a mixed martial arts event promoted by Cage Warriors that took place on June 19, 2026, in Manchester, England.

=== Background ===
A welterweight bout between Andreeas Binder and Sado Uçar headlined this event.

=== Results ===
Main card (UFC Fight Pass)
| Weight class | | | | Method | Round | Time | Notes |
|---|---|---|---|---|---|---|---|
| Welterweight | Andreeas Binder | def. | Sado Uçar | TKO (punches) | 1 | 2:59 |
| Lightweight | Alexander Lööf | def. | Alexander O'Sullivan | KO (punch) | 2 | 1:56 |
| Lightweight | Solomon Simon | def. | Erick Maia | TKO (punches) | 3 | 4:28 |
| Featherweight | Jake McHugh | def. | Lorenzo De Nigris | TKO (elbows) | 2 | 4:17 |
| Flyweight | Ger Harris | def. | Kayck Alencar | TKO (punches) | 1 | 2:19 |
| Lightweight | Stiven Shehu | def. | Kevin Robledo | TKO (head kick and punches) | 3 | 0:52 |
Preliminary card (UFC Fight Pass)
| Flyweight | Jordan Molinari | def. | Angelo Maria Terenzio | Decision (unanimous) (30–27, 30–27, 30–27) | 3 | 5:00 |
| Light Heavyweight | Trevor Makengo | def. | Matthew O'Rourke | Submission (rear-naked choke) | 1 | 3:46 |
| Women's Flyweight | Elsa Cerezo | def. | Eimear Darcy | TKO (punches) | 1 | 4:38 |
| Lightweight | Yusuf Nazokatov | def. | Cristiano Oliveira | Submission (rear-naked choke) | 2 | 2:53 |

== Cage Warriors 207 ==
Cage Warriors 207: Manchester
- Promotion: Cage Warriors
- Date: June 20, 2026
- Venue: BEC Arena
- City: Manchester, England

Cage Warriors 207: Manchester was a mixed martial arts event promoted by Cage Warriors that took place on June 20, 2026, in Manchester, England.

=== Background ===
A Cage Warriors Lightweight Championship bout between current champion Omiel Brown and undefeated prospect Ieuan Davies headlined this event.

=== Results ===
Main card (UFC Fight Pass)
| Weight class | | | | Method | Round | Time | Notes |
|---|---|---|---|---|---|---|---|
| Lightweight | Ieuan Davies | def. | Omiel Brown (c) | Technical Submission (rear-naked choke) | 1 | 1:01 | (Note: For the Cage Warriors Lightweight Championship.) |
| Bantamweight | Nathan Fletcher | def. | Rony Henrique | Decision (split) (29–28, 28–29, 30–27) | 3 | 5:00 |
| Lightweight | Marin Vetrila | def. | Shay Ingram | KO (punches) | 1 | 2:03 |
| Lightweight | Adam Cullen | def. | Carl Jones Jnr | Submission (anaconda choke) | 1 | 2:44 |
| Middleweight | Farshad Nazarnia | def. | Emile Vujakovic | Decision (unanimous) (30–27, 30–27, 30–27) | 3 | 5:00 |
| Lightweight | George Staines | def. | Conor McCarthy | Submission (rear-naked choke) | 2 | 2:19 |
Preliminary card (YouTube / UFC Fight Pass)
| Bantamweight | Davi Santos | def. | Fran Breen | Technical Submission (rear-naked choke) | 2 | 2:29 |
| Heavyweight | Josh Carrick | def. | Gvido Šhusts | TKO (punches) | 1 | 2:36 |
| Featherweight | Tom Wright | def. | Matteo Martignoni | Submission (guillotine choke) | 2 | 1:22 | (Note: Martignoni missed weight (146.9 lb).) |
| Bantamweight | Jack McLoughlin | def. | Aron Franz Kristjansson | Submission (rear-naked choke) | 1 | 2:59 |
| Flyweight | Nathanael Woods | def. | Josue Hernández | TKO (knee and punches) | 2 | 0:40 |

== Cage Warriors 208 ==
Cage Warriors 208: London
- Promotion: Cage Warriors
- Date: June 27, 2026
- Venue: Indigo at The O2
- City: London, England

Cage Warriors 208: London was a mixed martial arts event promoted by Cage Warriors that took place on June 27, 2026, in London, England.

=== Background ===
A Cage Warriors Featherweight Championship bout between current champion Nik Bagley and Aiden Lee headlined this event.

=== Results ===
Main card (UFC Fight Pass)
| Weight class | | | | Method | Round | Time | Notes |
|---|---|---|---|---|---|---|---|
| Featherweight | Nik Bagley (c) | def. | Aiden Lee | Submission (rear-naked choke) | 3 | 3:18 | (Note: For the Cage Warriors Featherweight Championship.) |
| Lightweight | Jordan Vucenic | def. | Nonato Junior | Submission (brabo choke) | 1 | 1:15 |
| Catchweight (140 lb) | Ollie Sarwa | def. | Pietro Mochetti | TKO (elbow and punches) | 1 | 2:46 |
| Welterweight | Manuel del Valle | def. | Michael Dubois | Submission (guillotine choke) | 1 | 3:01 |
| Welterweight | Tariq Pell | def. | Leon Duarte | Decision (unanimous) (29–28, 29–28, 29–28) | 3 | 5:00 |
Preliminary card (UFC Fight Pass)
| Bantamweight | Kadeem Perkins | def. | Ieuan Mackenzie | Decision (unanimous) (30–27, 30–27, 29–28) | 3 | 5:00 |
| Welterweight | Stephen Costello | def. | Andrea Kabali | Submission (rear-naked choke) | 2 | 4:12 |
| Lightweight | Callum Haughian | def. | Cameron Stewart | Decision (unanimous) (30–27, 30–27, 30–27) | 3 | 5:00 |
| Bantamweight | Paddy Rutledge | def. | Giovanni Fernandez | Decision (unanimous) (30–27, 30–26, 30–26) | 3 | 5:00 |

== Cage Warriors 209 ==
Cage Warriors 209: Newcastle
- Promotion: Cage Warriors
- Date: July 4, 2026
- Venue: Vertu Motors Arena
- City: Newcastle, England

Cage Warriors 209: Newcastle was a mixed martial arts event promoted by Cage Warriors that took place on July 4, 2026, in Newcastle, England.

=== Background ===
A lightweight bout between former Cage Warriors Lightweight Champion George Hardwick and Gavin Hughes was scheduled to headline this event, but Hughes withdrew from the bout and was replaced by Nicolas Sávio.

=== Results ===
Main card (UFC Fight Pass)
| Weight class | | | | Method | Round | Time | Notes |
|---|---|---|---|---|---|---|---|
| Lightweight | George Hardwick | def. | Nicolas Sávio | Decision (split) (29–28, 28–29, 29–28) | 3 | 5:00 |
| Light Heavyweight | Nell Ariano | def. | Norbert Pietrzak | Decision (unanimous) (29–28, 29–28, 29–28) | 3 | 5:00 |
| Catchweight (150 lb) | Oscar Ownsworth | def. | Gabriele Galluccio | Submission (ninja choke) | 1 | 4:27 |
| Middleweight | Fraser Patterson | def. | Dmitrii Ceacusta | Submission (guillotine choke) | 1 | 2:46 |
| Bantamweight | Rony Henrique | def. | Damiano Scogna | Decision (unanimous) (29–28, 29–28, 30–27) | 3 | 5:00 |
| Lightweight | Stevie Lee | def. | Vladimir Stanca | TKO (punches) | 2 | 4:27 |
Preliminary card (YouTube / UFC Fight Pass)
| Middleweight | Geoff Pavey | def. | David Allen | TKO (corner stoppage) | 1 | 5:00 |
| Lightweight | Randy Mboyo | def. | Anas Nfaou | KO (punches) | 1 | 3:44 | (Note: Mboyo missed weight (156.4 lb).) |
| Catchweight (161 lb) | Luca Borando | def. | Leandro Camargo | TKO (elbow) | 1 | 2:17 |
| Featherweight | Zanyar Kamaran | def. | Lincoln Strong | TKO (knee and punches) | 1 | 3:20 |
| Welterweight | Chris Morris | def. | Joshua Onwordi | Submission (rear-naked choke) | 3 | 2:40 |

== Cage Warriors 210 ==
Cage Warriors 210: Dublin
- Promotion: Cage Warriors
- Date: September 26, 2026
- Venue: Shelbourne Hall
- City: Dublin, Ireland

Cage Warriors 210: Dublin was a mixed martial arts event promoted by Cage Warriors that took place on September 26, 2026, in Dublin, Ireland.

=== Background ===
A Cage Warriors Middleweight Championship bout between current champion Paddy McCorry and Julio Cesar Spadaccini was scheduled to headline the event. However, Spadaccini pulled out from the bout and was replaced by Gustavo Sousa.

=== Results ===
Main card (UFC Fight Pass)
| Weight class | | | | Method | Round | Time | Notes |
|---|---|---|---|---|---|---|---|
| Middleweight | Gustavo Sousa | def. | Paddy McCorry (c) | Technical Submission (brabo choke) | 1 | 1:02 | (Note: For the Cage Warriors Middleweight Championship.) |
| Featherweight | Maximus Lally | def. | João Pedro Saldanha | TKO (punches) | 1 | 2:13 |
| Catchweight (132 lb) | Anderson Soares | def. | Ger Harris | Submission (triangle choke) | 2 | 4:22 | (Note: Soares missed weight (133.2 lb).) |
| Lightweight | Conor McCarthy | def. | Dumitru Girlean | TKO (punches) | 2 | 2:10 |
| Catchweight (150 lb) | Keith Keogh | def. | Jhonatan Cordeiro | Submission (rear-naked choke) | 2 | 2:01 |
| Lightweight | Kenny Mokhonoana | def. | Solomon Simon | Decision (unanimous) (29–28, 29–28, 29–28) | 3 | 5:00 |
Preliminary card (YouTube / UFC Fight Pass)
| Featherweight | Oliver Tero | def. | Lewis Byrne | Decision (unanimous) (30–27, 30–27, 30–27) | 3 | 5:00 |
| Flyweight | Ronan Deegan | def. | Billy Sutherland | Submission (arm-triangle choke) | 3 | 3:26 |
| Welterweight | Senan Coakley | def. | Louis Bricusse | TKO (punches and knee) | 1 | 3:05 |
| Featherweight | Miguel Haro | def. | Damien McKenna | Decision (unanimous) (30–27, 29–28, 29–28) | 3 | 5:00 |
| Featherweight | Jordan Walters | def. | Corey McLaughlin | Submission (brabo choke) | 1 | 1:46 |
| Catchweight (150 lb) | Cristiano Oliveira | def. | Alex Keogh | KO (punches) | 1 | 0:39 |

== Cage Warriors 211 ==
Cage Warriors 211: Rome
- Promotion: Cage Warriors
- Date: October 17, 2026
- Venue: PalaPellicone
- City: Rome, Italy

Cage Warriors 211: Rome was a mixed martial arts event promoted by Cage Warriors that took place on October 17, 2026, in Rome, Italy.

=== Background ===
A middleweight bout between former Cage Warriors Middleweight Champion Dario Bellandi and Renato Valente was scheduled to headline the event, but Valente pulled out and was replaced by Aldo Pereira.

=== Results ===
Main card (UFC Fight Pass)
| Weight class | | | | Method | Round | Time | Notes |
|---|---|---|---|---|---|---|---|
| Middleweight | Dario Bellandi | def. | Aldo Pereira | TKO (punches) | 2 | 0:13 |
| Featherweight | Giuseppe Mastrogiacomo | def. | Alexis Tsarmantidis | KO (knee to the body) | 1 | 3:37 |
| Bantamweight | Enrico Di Gangi | def. | Tommy Brunning | Submission (arm-triangle choke) | 2 | 2:43 |
| Bantamweight | Federico Rotoni | def. | Andrei Fabbi | Submission (brabo choke) | 1 | 4:52 |
| Featherweight | Simone Ali | def. | Alessandro Ortolani | TKO (punches) | 1 | 4:05 |
Preliminary card (YouTube / UFC Fight Pass)
| Lightweight | Christian Tosco | def. | Salvatore Bellotta | TKO (elbow and punches) | 3 | 2:29 | (Note: Bellotta missed weight (161.2 lb).) |
| Bantamweight | Jonathan Rivera | vs. | Angelo Coppola | Draw (split) (27–29, 29–27, 28–28) | 3 | 5:00 | (Note: Coppola missed weight (139.8 lb). Rivera was deducted one point in round 3 due to an illegal knee.) |
| Flyweight | Elez Guri | def. | Gabriele Lionetti | Decision (unanimous) (29–28, 29–28, 29–28) | 3 | 5:00 |
| Lightweight | Niko Ceraglia | def. | Valentino Greco | TKO (punches) | 1 | 4:26 |
| Catchweight (143 lb) | Jurgen Koci | def. | Ruben Vinci | TKO (punches) | 1 | 1:48 |
| Flyweight | Diego Giangirolami | def. | Kevin Caperna | TKO (retirement) | 1 | 2:41 |

== Cage Warriors 212 ==
Cage Warriors 212: Spanish Showcase
- Promotion: Cage Warriors
- Date: November 7, 2026
- Venue: BBC Studioworks Television Centre
- City: London, England

Cage Warriors 212: Spanish Showcase was a mixed martial arts event promoted by Cage Warriors that took place on November 7, 2026, in London, England.

=== Background ===
The event was a first event that took place at BBC Studioworks Television Centre. It was also called the event as "Spanish Showcase", before prepares visit to Spain in 2027.

A welterweight bout between Manuel del Valle and Luan Duarte headlined the event.

=== Results ===
Main card (UFC Fight Pass)
| Weight class | | | | Method | Round | Time | Notes |
|---|---|---|---|---|---|---|---|
| Welterweight | Manuel del Valle | def. | Luan Duarte | TKO (punches) | 2 | 2:13 |
| Catchweight (129 lb) | Mattia Giordano | def. | Maximilien Vallot | Decision (unanimous) (29–28, 29–28, 29–28) | 3 | 5:00 |
| Bantamweight | Paddy Rutledge | def. | Omar Sargent | Decision (split) (30–27, 28–29, 30–27) | 3 | 5:00 |
| Featherweight | Tommy Brunning | def. | Angel Belluci | Decision (unanimous) (29–28, 29–28, 29–28) | 3 | 5:00 | (Note: Belluci missed weight (146.6 lb).) |
| Catchweight (165 lb) | Ermil Xhaferi | def. | Samuel Blasco | TKO (punches) | 3 | 3:42 |
| Lightweight | Mohammad Hany Musleh | def. | Arturo Izquierdo | Submission (rear-naked choke) | 2 | 2:16 |
Preliminary card (YouTube / UFC Fight Pass)
| Catchweight (161 lb) | Armands Gruznovs | def. | Simone Patrizi | Submission (guillotine choke) | 3 | 3:34 |
| Catchweight (150 lb) | Connor Patterson | def. | Efstathios Piperigos | Submission (shoulder choke) | 1 | 2:51 | (Note: Piperigos missed weight (151.4 lb).) |
| Catchweight (177 lb) | Taylor Rose | def. | Milton Afonso Cabral | Submission (shoulder choke) | 1 | 3:49 |

== Cage Warriors 213 ==
Cage Warriors 213: London
- Promotion: Cage Warriors
- Date: November 14, 2026
- Venue: BBC Studioworks Television Centre
- City: London, England

Cage Warriors 213: London was a mixed martial arts event promoted by Cage Warriors that took place on November 14, 2026, in London, England.

=== Background ===
A Cage Warriors Featherweight Championship bout between current champion Nik Bagley and Bruno Souza headlined the event.

An interim Cage Warriors Flyweight Championship bout between Jawany Scott and Willians Nogueira served as the co-main event.

=== Results ===
Main card (UFC Fight Pass)
| Weight class | | | | Method | Round | Time | Notes |
|---|---|---|---|---|---|---|---|
| Featherweight | Nik Bagley (c) | vs. | Bruno Souza | No Contest (accidental groin kick) | 1 | 0:43 | (Note: For the Cage Warriors Featherweight Championship. Accidental groin strike rendered Souza unable to continue.) |
| Flyweight | Jawany Scott | def. | Willians Nogueira | Decision (unanimous) (48–47, 49–46, 49–46) | 5 | 5:00 | (Note: For the interim Cage Warriors Interim Flyweight Championship.) |
| Catchweight (161 lb) | Wellington Lopes | def. | Tariq Pell | KO (punches) | 1 | 3:58 |
| Bantamweight | Shirzad Qadrian | def. | Manoel Silva | TKO (retirement) | 1 | 5:00 |
| Welterweight | Sado Uçar | def. | Steven Hill | Submission (armbar) | 1 | 2:03 |
| Catchweight (140 lb) | Ollie Sarwa | def. | Ieuan Mackenzie | TKO (punches) | 1 | 3:53 |
Preliminary card (YouTube / UFC Fight Pass)
| Catchweight (130 lb) | Bobby Chikavhu | def. | Christos Ploumpis | Submission (anaconda choke) | 3 | 2:51 |
| Flyweight | James Wamsley | def. | Ben Edwards | Decision (unanimous) (30–27, 30–27, 30–27) | 3 | 5:00 |
| Lightweight | Callum Haughian | def. | Will Fox | Submission (rear-naked choke) | 3 | 1:13 | (Note: Haughian missed weight (160.2 lb).) |

== Cage Warriors 214 ==
Cage Warriors 214: Unplugged
- Promotion: Cage Warriors
- Date: November 27, 2026
- Venue: BEC Arena
- City: Manchester, England

Cage Warriors 214: Unplugged is an upcoming mixed martial arts event promoted by Cage Warriors that is scheduled to take place on November 27, 2026, in Manchester, England.

=== Fight card ===
Main card (UFC Fight Pass)
| Weight class | | | | Method | Round | Time | Notes |
|---|---|---|---|---|---|---|---|
| Featherweight | Alexander Lööf | vs. | Oscar Ownsworth |
| Flyweight | Tanio Pagliariccio | vs. | Igor Wojtas |
| Welterweight | Jordan O'Neill | vs. | Christopher Bajo |
| Women's Flyweight | Elsa Cerezo | vs. | Chloe Crozier |
| Flyweight | Nathanael Woods | vs. | Angelo Terenzio |

== Cage Warriors 215 ==
Cage Warriors 215: Manchester
- Promotion: Cage Warriors
- Date: November 28, 2026
- Venue: BEC Arena
- City: Manchester, England

Cage Warriors 215: Manchester is an upcoming mixed martial arts event promoted by Cage Warriors that is scheduled to take place on November 28, 2026, in Manchester, England.

=== Background ===
A Cage Warriors Lightweight Championship bout between current champion Ieuan Davies and former champion Jordan Vucenic is scheduled to headline the event.

=== Fight card ===
Main card (UFC Fight Pass)
| Weight class | | | | Method | Round | Time | Notes |
|---|---|---|---|---|---|---|---|
| Lightweight | Ieuan Davies (c) | vs. | Jordan Vucenic | | | | (Note: For the Cage Warriors Lightweight Championship.) |
| Welterweight | Shay Ingram | vs. | Steffen Rossevatn |
| Lightweight | Omiel Brown | vs. | Konstantinos Ntelis |
| Bantamweight | Nathan Fletcher | vs. | Anderson Soares |
| Lightweight | Adam Cullen | vs. | Jefferson André |
| Bantamweight | Jack Humphries | vs. | Alexandros Moumtzis |
| Lightweight | Charlie Dando | vs. | Jordan Walters |
| Flyweight | Joe Fields | vs. | Samir Faiddine |
| Flyweight | Sheldon Ryan | vs. | Gary Rooney |
| Flyweight | Connor Wilson | vs. | Davi Santos |
| Bantamweight | Jack McLoughlin | vs. | Jack Corr |
| Light Heavyweight | Branden Guest | vs. | Owen Cartridge |

== Cage Warriors 216 ==
Cage Warriors 216: Newcastle
- Promotion: Cage Warriors
- Date: December 5, 2026
- Venue: Vertu Motors Arena
- City: Newcastle, England

Cage Warriors 216: Newcastle is an upcoming mixed martial arts event promoted by Cage Warriors that is scheduled to take place on December 5, 2026, in Newcastle, England.

=== Fight card ===
Main card (UFC Fight Pass)
| Weight class | | | | Method | Round | Time | Notes |
|---|---|---|---|---|---|---|---|
| Lightweight | George Hardwick | vs. | Gavin Hughes |
| Middleweight | Justin Burlinson | vs. | Farshad Nazarnia |
| Bantamweight | Jack Foote | vs. | TBA |
| Lightweight | Chris Bungard | vs. | TBA |
| Featherweight | Milad Ahady | vs. | Alexander O'Sullivan |
| Lightweight | Michael Blair | vs. | Thomas Paull |
| Featherweight | Stevie Lee | vs. | Cristiano Oliveira |
| Featherweight | Joshua Abraham | vs. | Miguel Haro |
| Lightweight | Ryan Campbell | vs. | TBA |
| Bantamweight | Jamie McGowan | vs. | TBA |
| Lightweight | Jordan Stronge | vs. | TBA |
| Welterweight | Geoff Pavey | vs. | Lewis Urquhart |

== See also ==
- 2026 in UFC
- 2026 in Professional Fighters League
- 2026 in ONE Championship
- 2026 in Absolute Championship Akhmat
- 2026 in Konfrontacja Sztuk Walki
- 2026 in Legacy Fighting Alliance
- 2026 in Rizin Fighting Federation
- 2026 in LUX Fight League
- 2026 in Oktagon MMA
- 2026 in Brave Combat Federation
