= 2009 in Cage Warriors =

Mixed martial arts events

Information
- First date: January 30, 2009
- Last date: January 30, 2009

Events
- Total events: 1

Fights
- Total fights: 11

Chronology
2008 in Cage Warriors	2009 in Cage Warriors	2010 in Cage Warriors

The year 2009 is the eighth year in the history of Cage Warriors, a mixed martial arts promotion based in the United Kingdom. In 2009 Cage Warriors held 1 event, Cage Warriors 36: USA Destruction.

== Events list ==
#	Event Title	Date	Arena	Location
36	Cage Warriors 36: USA Destruction	January 30, 2009		Orlando, United States

== Cage Warriors 36: USA Destruction ==
Cage Warriors 36: USA Destruction was an event held on January 30, 2009 in Orlando, United States.

=== Results ===
Main Card
Weight class				Method	Round	Time	Notes
	Yosmany Cabezas	def.	Gareth Joseph	Submission (Triangle Choke)	1	4:36
	Isidro Gonzalez	def.	Rich Attonito	Submission (Armbar)	1	4:21
	Jason Ball	def.	Glenn Mincer	TKO (Punches)	3	1:36
	Clayton McKinney	def.	Carlos Gonzalez	Submission (Armbar)	1	0:33
	Kevin Abrante	def.	Zach Knight	TKO (Punches)	1	3:06
	Robert Goodridge	def.	Josh Bacallao	Decision (Unanimous)	3	5:00
	Brian Eckstein	def.	Jack Murphy	TKO (Doctor Stoppage)	1	3:20
	Jim Alers	def.	Brent Silva	Submission (Rear-Naked Choke)	1	4:16
	James Hammortree	def.	Jay Hernandez	KO (Punches)	1	0:08
	Daniel Lovett	def.	Rory Shallcross	Submission (Rear-Naked Choke)	1	4:17
	Daniel Gurzenda	def.	Mike Byrnes	TKO (Punches)	2	4:02
