= Bendy Casimir =

French mixed martial arts fighter

- Born: June 10, 1980 (age 46); Alfortville, Val de Marne, France
- Nationality: French
- Height: 5 ft 5 in (1.65 m)
- Weight: 145 lb (66 kg; 10.4 st) 155 lb (70 kg; 11.1 st)
- Division: Featherweight; Lightweight
- Fighting out of: Paris, France
- Team: Drysdale Jiu-Jitsu (primary); Haute Tension (other)
- Years active: 2001; 2003–present

Mixed martial arts record
- Total: 39
- Wins: 22
- By knockout: 4
- By submission: 13
- By decision: 5
- Losses: 15
- By knockout: 3
- By submission: 5
- By decision: 7
- Draws: 2

Other information
- Mixed martial arts record from Sherdog

Bendy Casimir (born June 10, 1980) is a French professional Lightweight mixed martial artist. He has competed for the WEC and M-1 Global.

== WEC career ==
He made his WEC debut against Ricardo Lamas on March 6, 2010, at WEC 47, losing via first-round knockout.

Casimir then faced Erik Koch on June 20, 2010, at WEC 49. He lost the fight via submission (triangle choke) in the first round.

== Mixed martial arts record ==
Professional record breakdown
38 matches	21 wins	15 losses
By knockout	4	3
By submission	13	5
By decision	4	7
Draws	2	

Res.	Record	Opponent	Method	Event	Date	Round	Time	Location	Notes
Win	21–15–2	Noah Ali	Submission (heel hook)	RITC 55	September 30, 2017	1	1:24	Lethbridge, Alberta, Canada	
Loss	20–15–2	Manny Bermudez	Submission (triangle choke)	Cage Titans 35	August 12, 2017	1	1:12	Plymouth, Massachusetts, United States	
Loss	20–14–2	Josh Hill	Decision (unanimous)	Z Promotions Fight Night 2	April 9, 2016	3	5:00	Medicine Hat, Alberta, Canada	
Loss	20–13–2	Chris Gutiérrez	Decision (unanimous)	SCS 27: Survival	August 22, 2015	5	5:00	Hinton, Oklahoma, United States	For the SCS Bantamweight Championship.
Loss	20–12–2	Jesse Brock	Decision (unanimous)	FSF: Front Street Fights 5	May 15, 2015	3	5:00	Boise, Idaho, United States	
Win	20–11–2	Curtis Demarce	KO (spinning back fist)	HKFC: School of Hard Knocks 41	January 30, 2015	2	0:40	Calgary, Alberta, Canada	
Loss	19–11–2	Erinaldo dos Santos Rodrigues	Decision (unanimous)	XVT 5: Franca vs. Kheder	December 19, 2010	3	5:00	Cartago, Costa Rica	
Loss	19–10–2	Rafaello Oliveira	Decision (unanimous)	Recife FC 3	December 2, 2010	3	5:00	Recife, Brazil	
Loss	19–9–2	Julio Cesar de Almeida	Decision (unanimous)	Panama FC 1: War of Wars	October 8, 2010	3	5:00	Panama City, Panama	
Loss	19–8–2	John Makdessi	Decision (unanimous)	MFL 3: Mixed Fight League	September 25, 2010	3	5:00	Montreal, Quebec, Canada	
Loss	19–7–2	Erik Koch	Submission (triangle choke)	WEC 49	June 20, 2010	1	3:01	Edmonton, Alberta, Canada	Featherweight bout
Loss	19–6–2	Ricardo Lamas	KO (knee)	WEC 47	March 6, 2010	1	3:43	Columbus, Ohio, United States	
Win	19–5–2	Maratbek Kalabekov	Decision (unanimous)	ProFC: Russia vs. Europe	March 29, 2009	3	5:00	Rostov-on-Don, Russia	
Win	18–5–2	Niko Puhakka	Submission (guillotine choke)	Fight Festival 25	March 14, 2009	2	1:35	Helsinki, Finland	
Win	17–5–2	Samuel Judes	TKO (punches)	Shooto Belgium - Against All Fakes	December 13, 2008	1	4:42	Dinant, Belgium	
Loss	16–5–2	Takashi Nakakura	Submission (rear naked choke)	Shooto: Shooto Tradition 4	November 29, 2008	1	4:58	Tokyo, Japan	
Win	16–4–2	Vaclav Pribyl	Submission (armbar)	Hell Cage 2	October 19, 2008	1	3:54	Prague, Czech Republic	
Win	15–4–2	Anton Kuivanen	Submission (kneebar)	Hell Cage 2	October 19, 2008	1	4:03	Prague, Czech Republic	
Win	14–4–2	Shinji Sasaki	Decision (unanimous)	Shooto: Shooto Tradition 1	May 3, 2008	2	5:00	Tokyo, Japan	
Win	13–4–2	Andre Winner	Decision (majority)	Cage Warriors: Enter the Rough House 6	April 19, 2008	3	5:00	Nottingham, England	
Win	12–4–2	Mikhail Malyutin	Decision (split)	M-1 Challenge 2: Russia	April 3, 2008	2	5:00	Saint Petersburg, Russia	
Win	11–4–2	Mikhail Malyutin	Decision (split)	M-1: Slamm	March 2, 2008	3	5:00	Amsterdam, Netherlands	
Win	10–4–2	Mike Duncan	Submission (kneebar)	Shooto Belgium IV: Encounter the Braves	December 15, 2007	3	0:10	Charleroi, Belgium	
Draw	9–4–2	Amir Shankhalov	Draw	M-1 Global: International Mix	October 17, 2007	3	5:00	Saint Petersburg, Russia	
Win	9–4–1	Daniel Thomas	Submission (guillotine choke)	Cage Rage Contenders: Dynamite	September 29, 2007	1	3:19	Dublin, Ireland	
Win	8–4–1	Chris Stringer	Submission (guillotine choke)	Cage Wars 7: Scotland the Brave	August 4, 2007	1	2:16	Glasgow, Scotland	
Win	7–4–1	Peter Duncan	Submission (guillotine choke)	Cage Wars 6: Battle in Belfast	April 21, 2007	1	1:00	Belfast, Northern Ireland	
Win	6–4–1	Seydina Seck	Submission (kneebar)	Xtreme Gladiators 3	June 9, 2007	1	2:09	Paris, France	
Win	5–4–1	Vincent Latoel	Submission (kimura)	Shooto Belgium: Consecration	March 31, 2007	1	4:02	Charleroi, Belgium	
Loss	4–4–1	Yuri Ivlev	Submission (armbar)	Hell Cage 2	November 4, 2005	1	4:54	Saint Petersburg, Russia	
Loss	4–3–1	Thomas Hytten	TKO	European Vale Tudo 5: "Phoenix": The European Grand Prix 2005	October 8, 2005	1	4:35	Stockholm, Sweden	
Win	4–2–1	Dave Swann	Submission (arm triangle)	CWFC: Strike Force	May 21, 2005	1	4:07	Coventry, England	
Draw	3–2–1	Tom Niinimäki	Draw	Shooto Sweden: Second Impact	March 14, 2005	2	5:00	Stockholm, Sweden	
Win	3–2	Michal Hamrsmid	TKO	Night of the Gladiators	December 5, 2004	1		Prague, Czech Republic	
Win	2–2	Petr Mai	Submission (kneebar)	Night of the Gladiators	December 5, 2004	1		Prague, Czech Republic	
Win	1–2	Philly San	TKO (punches)	UK MMA Championships 6: Extreme Warriors	February 29, 2004	1	0:45	Essex, England	
Loss	0–2	Robbie Olivier	Submission (choke)	UK MMA Championships 4: Battle of Britain	June 1, 2003	1		Essex, England	
Loss	0–1	Leigh Remedios	Submission (strikes)	Millennium Brawl 4: The Battle of Trafalgar	October 14, 2001	3		Buckinghamshire, England	
