= 2003 in Cage Warriors =

Mixed martial arts events

Information
- First date: March 16, 2003
- Last date: November 2, 2003

Events
- Total events: 3

Fights
- Total fights: 37

Chronology
2002 in Cage Warriors	2003 in Cage Warriors	2004 in Cage Warriors

The year 2003 is the second year in the history of Cage Warriors, a mixed martial arts promotion based in the United Kingdom. In 2003 Cage Rage Championships held 3 events beginning with, CWFC 3: Cage Warriors 3.

== Events list ==
#	Event title	Date	Arena	Location
6	CWFC 5: Cage Warriors 5	November 2, 2003		South Shields, England
5	CWFC 4: UK vs. France	July 27, 2003		Portsmouth, England
4	CWFC 3: Cage Warriors 3	March 16, 2003		Southampton, England

== CWFC 3: Cage Warriors 3 ==
CWFC 3: Cage Warriors 3 was an event held on March 16, 2003 in Southampton, England.

=== Results ===
Main Card
Weight class				Method	Round	Time	Notes
	Tengiz Tedoradze	vs.	Steve Thomas	No Contest	1	N/A
	Gareth Roberts	def.	Robert Sarkozi	Submission (Armbar)	1	N/A
	Jean Silva	def.	Laszlo Forro	Submission (Guillotine Choke)	1	N/A
	James Schiavo	def.	Andy Walker	Submission (Armbar)	1	N/A
	Jeff Lawson	def.	Andy Dicks	Submission (Armbar)	1	N/A
	Graham Day	def.	Graham Connelly	TKO (Punches)	3	N/A
	Paul McVeigh	def.	Chin Weakasingh	Decision	3	5:00
	Alex Owen	def.	Chris Freeborn	Submission (Armbar)	1	N/A
	Ashley Wilson	def.	Will Elworthy	TKO (Submission to punches)	1	N/A
	Mohamed Khacha	def.	Alex de Souza	KO (Punch)	1	N/A
	Rosi Sexton	def.	Carla O'Sullivan	Submission (Rear-Naked Choke)	1	N/A
	Gavin Bradley	def.	Leon Dickens	Submission (Armbar)	1	N/A

== CWFC 4: UK vs. France ==
CWFC 4: UK vs. France was an event held on July 27, 2003 in Southampton, England.

=== Results ===
Main Card
Weight class				Method	Round	Time	Notes
	Matt Ewin	def.	Ross Pettifer	TKO (Submission to punches)	2	1:49
	Adrian Degorski	def.	Paul Jenkins	KO (Punch)	1	N/A
	Paul Sutherland	def.	Ozzy Haluk	TKO (Submission to punches)	2	2:34
	Paul McVeigh	def.	David Mclaughlin	TKO (Submission to punches)	1	2:07
	Emmanuel Fernandez	def.	Robbie Olivier	Submission (Triangle Choke)	1	N/A
	Florentim Amorim	def.	Paul Daley	Submission (Rear-Naked Choke)	1	N/A
	Andy Lagden	def.	Laurent Bonafoux	KO (Knee)	1	N/A
	Andy Cooper	def.	Mohamed Khacha	Submission (Rear-Naked Choke)	2	3:20
	Guillaume Monod	def.	Ricky Moore	Submission (Triangle Choke)	1	N/A
	Dave Elliot	def.	Andy Butlin	Submission (Armbar)	1	0:47
	Graham Day	def.	Gavin Bradley	Submission (Choke)	1	N/A
	Robert Mitchell	def.	Glen Appleby	TKO (Corner Stoppage)	1	5:00
	Ian Butlin	def.	Chris Freeborn	Submission (Armbar)	1	N/A
	Peter Irving	def.	Graham Connelly	Submission (Triangle Choke)	1	N/A

== CWFC 5: Cage Warriors 5 ==
CWFC 5: Cage Warriors 5 was an event held on November 2, 2003 in Portsmouth, England.

=== Results ===
Main Card
Weight class				Method	Round	Time	Notes
	Ian Freeman	def.	Keith Dace	TKO (Punches)	1	0:47
	Abdul Mohamed	def.	Andy Cooper	Decision	3	5:00
	Emmanuel Fernandez	def.	Pete Tiarks	Submission (Triangle Choke)	1	2:58
	Robert Mitchell	def.	Ross Pettifer	Submission (Triangle Choke)	1	3:57
	David Butlin	def.	Brian Blewitt	KO (Punches)	1	0:30
	Adam Edwards	def.	Ozzy Haluk	Submission	2	1:57
	Andy Costello	def.	Steve Mathews	TKO (Submission to punches)	1	0:35
	Jean Silva	def.	Dave Elliot	TKO (Submission to punches)	1	2:20
	John Nicholson	def.	Sandy Geddes	Decision (Majority)	3	5:00
	Andy Cooper	def.	Paul Jenkins	TKO (Cut)	2	5:00
	Marvin Li	def.	Brian Sugden	Submission (Rear-Naked Choke)	1	1:01

== See also ==
- Cage Warriors
