= Cage Warriors =

Mixed martial arts promotion company

- Current season, competition or edition: 2026 in Cage Warriors
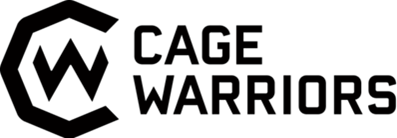
- Sport: Mixed martial arts promotion
- Founded: 2001; 25 years ago
- Founder: Dougie Truman
- Owners: Graham Boylan; Ian Dean
- Headquarters: London, England
- Website: http://www.cagewarriors.com

Cage Warriors (CW) is an Irish-owned mixed martial arts (MMA) promotion company based in London, England. The promotion was established in 2001 and staged its first MMA event in London in July, 2002.

Many MMA stars have made their names under the Cage Warriors banner, including Conor McGregor, Michael Bisping, Paddy Pimblett, Gegard Mousasi, Tom Aspinall, Antônio Silva, Ian Machado Garry, Martin Kampmann, Dan Hardy, Joe Duffy, Cathal Pendred, Neil Seery, and Dennis Siver. CW are one of the few top promotions to take their events abroad, travelling throughout countries in Europe, North America and the Middle East.

The promotion is watched globally via a host of television partners such as Viasat, and is one of the featured promotions on the Ultimate Fighting Championship (UFC)'s digital streaming service, UFC Fight Pass. It is currently being presented by UFC & BT Sport analyst Dan Hardy, with commentators Josh Palmer and Brad Wharton.

== History ==
Cage Warriors Fighting Championship (CWFC) was founded by Dougie Truman in 2001; the first event, titled 'Armageddon', took place on 27 July 2002, and saw notable fighters such as Jean Silva, Rosi Sexton, Matt Ewin and Paul Jenkins claim victories.

Irishman Graham Boylan assumed control of Cage Warriors in 2010 and expanded the promotion's reach to mainland Europe and Asia, staging shows in England, Ireland, Russia, Ukraine, Jordan, United Arab Emirates, Lebanon and Bahrain. The Cage Warriors head office is located in London.

Following Cage Warriors 74 in November 2014 the promotion went into hiatus, with Boylan announcing his resignation as CEO in February 2015.

However, in June 2015, Boylan announced on The MMA Hour he had acquired the promotion and would be bringing it back to prominence again.

The promotion has since secured a digital broadcasting deal with the UFC to have its shows shown live across the world on UFC Fight Pass, and has also brokered television broadcast deals with major broadcasters across Europe and Asia.

Cage Warriors 114 marked the first time a mixed martial arts event in the United Kingdom was officially approved by the government.

== Broadcast deals ==
Cage Warriors Events are watched globally via a host of television partners such as Viasat, and is one of the few featured promotions on UFC’s digital streaming service UFC Fight Pass.

Country	Broadcaster
Worldwide	UFC Fight Pass
Balkans	Sport Klub
Belgium, Italy & Luxembourg	Eleven Sports Network
Bulgaria	Max Sport
Eurasia (including Ukraine)	Setanta Sports Eurasia
India	Euro Sport
Indonesia & Timor Leste	Mola TV
Myanmar	Canal+
The Netherlands	Eurosport
Nordic	Viasat
Spain	Eurosport (Note: Eurosport 2: Fourteen matches)
Sub-saharan Africa	StarTimes
Thailand	TrueVisions
Turkey	S Sport
Vietnam	K+

== Rules ==
Cage Warriors bouts are conducted in conjunction with local athletic commissions, using the Unified Rules of Mixed Martial Arts.

Cage Warriors bouts are officiated by top European officials, including British referees Marc Goddard and Rich Mitchell, and judged by world-experienced officials including Ben Cartlidge, David Lethaby and Mark Collett.

== List of events ==
=== Scheduled events ===
#	Event	Date	Venue	Location
212	Cage Warriors 199	6 December 2025	Vertu Motors Arena	Newcastle, England
211	Cage Warriors 198	22 November 2025	BEC Arena	Manchester, England
210	Cage Warriors 197	21 November 2025	BEC Arena	Manchester, England

=== Past events ===
#	Event	Date	Venue	Location
209	Cage Warriors 196	15 November 2025	Indigo at The O2	London, England
208	Cage Warriors 195	4 October 2025	PalaPellicone	Rome, Italy
207	Cage Warriors 194	27 September 2025	Shelbourne Hall	Dublin, Ireland
206	Cage Warriors 193	13 September 2025	Vertu Motors Arena	Newcastle, England
205	Cage Warriors 192	12 July 2025	Indigo at The O2	London, England
204	Cage Warriors 191	28 June 2025	BEC Arena	Manchester, England
203	Cage Warriors 190	27 June 2025	BEC Arena	Manchester, England
202	Cage Warriors 189	31 May 2025	PalaPellicone	Rome, Italy
201	Cage Warriors 188	26 April 2025	Shelbourne Hall	Dublin, Ireland
200	Cage Warriors 187	19 April 2025	Braehead Arena	Glasgow, Scotland
199	Cage Warriors 186	21 March 2025	Indigo at The O2	London, England
198	Cage Warriors 185	15 March 2025	BEC Arena	Manchester, England
197	Cage Warriors 184	14 March 2025	BEC Arena	Manchester, England
196	Cage Warriors 183	7 March 2025	PalaPellicone	Rome, Italy
195	Cage Warriors 182	13 December 2024	Sycuan Casino Resort	San Diego, California, US
194	Cage Warriors 181	23 November 2024	Vertu Motors Arena	Newcastle, England
193	Cage Warriors 180	15 November 2024	Indigo at The O2	London, England
192	Cage Warriors 179	2 November 2024	PalaPellicone	Rome, Italy
191	Cage Warriors 178	21 September 2024	BEC Arena	Manchester, England
190	Cage Warriors 177	20 September 2024	BEC Arena	Manchester, England
189	Cage Warriors 176	7 September 2024	Braehead Arena	Glasgow, Scotland
188	Cage Warriors 175	25 July 2024	BEC Arena	Manchester, England
187	Cage Warriors 174	20 July 2024	Indigo at The O2	London, England
186	Cage Warriors 173	7 June 2024	Sycuan Casino Resort	San Diego, California, US
185	Cage Warriors 172	25 May 2024	Vertu Motors Arena	Newcastle, England
184	Cage Warriors 171	20 April 2024	Braehead Arena	Glasgow, Scotland
183	Cage Warriors 170	6 April 2024	Shelbourne Hall	Dublin, Ireland
182	Cage Warriors 169	30 March 2024	Indigo at the O2	London, England
181	Cage Warriors 168	16 March 2024	BEC Arena	Manchester, England
180	Cage Warriors 167	15 March 2024	BEC Arena	Manchester, England
179	Cage Warriors 166	23 February 2024	Sycuan Casino Resort	San Diego, California, US
178	Cage Warriors 165	15 December 2023	Sycuan Casino Resort	San Diego, California, US
177	Cage Warriors 164	25 November 2023	Vertu Motors Arena	Newcastle, England
176	Cage Warriors 163	11 November 2023	Indigo at The O2	London, England
175	Cage Warriors 162	28 October 2023	Fiera Roma	Rome, Italy
174	Cage Warriors 161	14 October 2023	Shelbourne Hall	Dublin, Ireland
173	Cage Warriors 160	29 September 2023	BEC Arena	Manchester, England
172	Cage Warriors 159	8 September 2023	Sycuan Casino Resort	San Diego, California, US
171	Cage Warriors 158	29 July 2023	Fiera Roma	Rome, Italy
170	Cage Warriors 157	21 July 2023	Indigo at The O2	London, England
169	Cage Warriors 156	1 July 2023	Vale Sports Arena	Cardiff, Wales
168	Cage Warriors 155	2 June 2023	Sycuan Casino Resort	San Diego, California, US
167	Cage Warriors 154	6 May 2023	Fiera Roma	Rome, Italy
166	Cage Warriors 153	29 April 2023	3Arena	Dublin, Ireland
165	Cage Warriors 152	15 April 2023	BEC Arena	Manchester, England
164	Cage Warriors 151	24 March 2023	BT Sport Studio	London, England
163	Cage Warriors 150	17 March 2023	Indigo at The O2	London, England
162	Cage Warriors 149	3 March 2023	Sycuan Casino Resort	San Diego, California, US
161	Cage Warriors 148	31 December 2022	Indigo at The O2	London, England
160	Cage Warriors 147	20 November 2022	BT Sport Studio	London, England
159	Cage Warriors 146	12 November 2022	BEC Arena	Manchester, England
158	Cage Warriors 145	4 November 2022	Indigo at The O2	London, England
157	Cage Warriors 144	7 October 2022	Fiera Roma	Rome, Italy
156	Cage Warriors 143	23 September 2022	Humphrey's Concert by The Bay	San Diego, California, US
155	Cage Warriors 142	13 August 2022	Ebbw Vale Sports Centre	Ebbw Vale, Wales
154	Cage Warriors 141	22 July 2022	The O2 Arena	London, England
153	Cage Warriors 140	25 June 2022	SSE Arena	Belfast, Northern Ireland
152	Cage Warriors 139	10 June 2022	Humphrey's Concert by The Bay	San Diego, California, US
151	Cage Warriors 138	28 May 2022	Charter Hall	Colchester, England
150	Cage Warriors 137	27 May 2022	Charter Hall	Colchester, England
149	Cage Warriors 136	2 April 2022	BEC Arena	Manchester, England
148	Cage Warriors 135	1 April 2022	BEC Arena	Manchester, England
147	Cage Warriors 134	18 March 2022	The O2 Arena	London, England
146	Cage Warriors 133	4 March 2022	Del March Arena	San Diego, California, US
145	Cage Warriors 132	11 December 2021	York Hall	London, England
144	Cage Warriors 131	10 December 2021	York Hall	London, England
143	Cage Warriors 130	17 October 2021	Humphrey's Concert on the Bay	San Diego, California, US
142	Cage Warriors 129	2 October 2021	York Hall	London, England
141	Cage Warriors 128	1 October 2021	York Hall	London, England
140	Cage Warriors 127	30 September 2021	York Hall	London, England
139	Cage Warriors 126	1 August 2021	Humphrey's Concert by the Bay	San Diego, California, US
138	Cage Warriors 125	26 June 2021	York Hall	London, England
137	Cage Warriors 124	25 June 2021	York Hall	London, England
136	Cage Warriors 123	24 June 2021	York Hall	London, England
135	Cage Warriors 122	20 March 2021	York Hall	London, England
134	Cage Warriors 121	19 March 2021	York Hall	London, England
133	Cage Warriors 120	18 March 2021	York Hall	London, England
132	Cage Warriors 119	12 December 2020	York Hall	London, England
131	Cage Warriors 118	11 December 2020	York Hall	London, England
130	Cage Warriors 117	10 December 2020	York Hall	London, England
129	Cage Warriors 116	26 September 2020	BEC Arena	Manchester, England
128	Cage Warriors 115	25 September 2020	BEC Arena	Manchester, England
127	Cage Warriors 114	24 September 2020	BEC Arena	Manchester, England
—	Cage Warriors 119 (cancelled)	8 August 2020	Ice Arena Wales	Cardiff, Wales
—	Cage Warriors 118 (cancelled)	25 July 2020	Neptune Stadium	Cork, Ireland
—	Cage Warriors 117 (cancelled)	20 June 2020	Indigo at The O2	London, England
—	Cage Warriors 116 (cancelled)	13 June 2020	Ice Arena Wales	Cardiff, Wales
—	Cage Warriors 115 (cancelled)	16 May 2020	SSE Arena	Belfast, Northern Ireland
—	Cage Warriors 114 (cancelled)	18 April 2020	Arena Birmingham	Birmingham, England
126	Cage Warriors 113	20 March 2020	BEC Arena	Manchester, England
125	Cage Warriors 112	7 March 2020	BEC Arena	Manchester, England
124	Cage Warriors 111	22 November 2019	Indigo at The O2	London, England
123	Cage Warriors 110	9 November 2019	Neptune Stadium	Cork, Ireland
122	Cage Warriors 109	26 October 2019	Resorts World Arena	Birmingham, England
121	Cage Warriors 108	12 October 2019	Ice Arena Wales	Cardiff, Wales
120	Cage Warriors 107	28 September 2019	Exhibition Centre Liverpool	Liverpool, England
119	Cage Warriors: Unplugged 2	6 September 2019	BT Sport Studio	London, England
118	Cage Warriors 106	29 June 2019	Hammersmith Apollo	London, England
117	Cage Warriors 105	31 May 2019	Colchester Charter Hall	Colchester, England
116	Cage Warriors 104	27 April 2019	Ice Arena Wales	Cardiff, Wales
115	Cage Warriors 103	9 March 2019	K.B. Hallen	Copenhagen, Denmark
114	Cage Warriors 102	2 March 2019	Indigo at The O2	London, England
113	Cage Warriors 101	16 February 2019	Exhibition Centre Liverpool	Liverpool, England
112	Cage Warriors 100	8 December 2018	Ice Arena Wales	Cardiff, Wales
111	Cage Warriors 99	17 November 2018	Colchester Charter Hall	Colchester, England
110	Cage Warriors 98	20 October 2018	Genting Arena	Birmingham, England
109	Cage Warriors 97	29 September 2018	Ice Arena Wales	Cardiff, Wales
108	Cage Warriors 96	1 September 2018	Echo Arena	Liverpool, England
107	Cage Warriors 95	21 July 2018	Indigo at The O2	London, England
106	Cage Warriors 94	16 June 2018	Lotto Arena	Antwerp, Belgium
105	Cage Warriors 93	28 April 2018	Lisebergshallen	Gothenburg, Sweden
104	Cage Warriors 92	24 March 2018	Indigo at The O2	London, England
103	Cage Warriors 91	3 March 2018	Newport Centre	Newport, Wales
102	Cage Warriors 90	24 February 2018	Echo Arena	Liverpool, England
101	Cage Warriors 89	25 November 2017	Lotto Arena	Antwerp, Belgium
100	Cage Warriors 88	28 October 2017	Echo Arena	Liverpool, England
99	Cage Warriors 87	14 October 2017	Newport Centre	Newport, Wales
98	Cage Warriors 86	16 September 2017	Indigo at The O2	London, England
97	Cage Warriors 85	24 June 2017	O2 Academy Bournemouth	Bournemouth, England
96	Cage Warriors 84	2 June 2017	Indigo at The O2	London, England
95	Cage Warriors 83	6 May 2017	Newport Centre	Newport, Wales
94	Cage Warriors 82	1 April 2017	Echo Arena	Liverpool, England
93	Cage Warriors 81	4 March 2017	3Arena	Dublin, Ireland
92	Cage Warriors 80	18 February 2017	Indigo at The O2	London, England
91	Cage Warriors: Unplugged 1	12 November 2016	BT Sport Studio	London, England
90	Cage Warriors 79	15 October 2016	Newport Centre	Newport, Wales
89	Cage Warriors 78	10 September 2016	Echo Arena	Liverpool, England
88	Cage Warriors 77	8 July 2016	Camden Centre	London, England
87	Cage Warriors 76	4 June 2016	Newport Centre	Newport, Wales
86	Cage Warriors 75	15 April 2016	Camden Centre	London, England
85	Cage Warriors 74	15 November 2014	Copper Box Arena	London, England
84	Cage Warriors 73	1 November 2014	Metro Radio Arena	Newcastle, England
83	Cage Warriors 72	13 September 2014	Newport Centre	Newport, Wales
82	Cage Warriors 71	22 August 2014	Al-Hussein Youth City Boxing Arena	Amman, Jordan
81	Cage Warriors 70	16 August 2014	The Helix	Dublin, Ireland
80	Cage Warriors 69	7 June 2014	O2 Forum Kentish Town	London, England
79	Cage Warriors 68	3 May 2014	Echo Arena	Liverpool, England
78	Cage Warriors: Fight Night 11	18 April 2014	Al-Hussein Youth City Boxing Arena	Amman, Jordan
77	Cage Warriors 67	12 April 2014	The LC	Swansea, Wales
76	Cage Warriors: Fight Night 10	28 March 2014	Al-Hussein Youth City Boxing Arena	Amman, Jordan
75	Cage Warriors 66	22 March 2014	Ballerup Super Arena	Ballerup, Denmark
74	Cage Warriors 65	1 March 2014	The Helix	Dublin, Ireland
73	Cage Warriors 64	15 February 2014	O2 Forum Kentish Town	London, England
72	Cage Warriors 63	31 December 2013	The Helix	Dublin, Ireland
71	Cage Warriors 61	14 December 2013	Al-Hussein Youth Boxing Arena	Amman, Jordan
70	Cage Warriors 62	7 December 2013	Metro Radio Arena	Newcastle, England
69	Cage Warriors: Fight Night 9	25 October 2013	Al-Hussein Youth Boxing Arena	Amman, Jordan
68	Cage Warriors 60	5 October 2013	O2 Forum Kentish Town	London, England
67	Cage Warriors 59	14 September 2013	Cardiff International Arena	Cardiff, Wales
66	Cage Warriors 58	24 August 2013	Olympisk Arena	Grozny, Russia
65	Cage Warriors 57	20 July 2013	Echo Arena	Liverpool, England
64	Cage Warriors 56	6 July 2013	O2 Forum Kentish Town	London, England
63	Cage Warriors 55	1 June 2013	The Helix	Dublin, Ireland
62	Cage Warriors: Fight Night 8	11 May 2013	Mirbeh Sports Hall	Al Fujairah, United Arab Emirates
61	Cage Warriors 54	4 May 2013	Cardiff International Arena	Cardiff, Wales
60	Cage Warriors 53	13 April 2013	Kelvin Hall International Sports Arena	Glasgow, Scotland
59	Cage Warriors 52	9 March 2013	O2 Forum Kentish Town	London, England
58	Cage Warriors 51	31 December 2012	The Helix	Dublin, Ireland
57	Cage Warriors 50	8 December 2012	Kelvin Hall International Sports Arena	Glasgow, Scotland
56	Cage Warriors 49	27 October 2012	St David's Hall	Cardiff, Wales
55	Cage Warriors: Fight Night 7	1 September 2012	Al-Hussein Youth City Boxing Arena	Amman, Jordan
54	Cage Warriors 48	21 July 2012	O2 Forum Kentish Town	London, England
53	Cage Warriors 47	2 June 2012	The Helix	Dublin, Ireland
52	Cage Warriors: Fight Night 6	24 May 2012	Khalifa Sports City Stadium	Isa Town, Bahrain
51	Cage Warriors: Fight Night 5	12 April 2012	Al-Hussein Youth City Boxing Arena	Amman, Jordan
50	Cage Warriors: Fight Night 4	16 March 2012	Dubai World Trade Centre	Dubai, United Arab Emirates
49	Cage Warriors 46	23 February 2012	Stereo Plaza	Kyiv, Ukraine
48	Cage Warriors 45	18 February 2012	O2 Forum Kentish Town	London, England
47	Cage Warriors: Fight Night 3	11 February 2012	Al Habtoor Grand Hotel and Convention Center	Beirut, Lebanon
46	Cage Warriors 44	1 October 2011	O2 Forum Kentish Town	London, England
45	Cage Warriors: Fight Night 2	8 September 2011	Al-Hussein Youth City Boxing Arena	Amman, Jordan
44	Cage Warriors 43	9 July 2011	O2 Forum Kentish Town	London, England
43	Cage Warriors: Fight Night 1	16 June 2011	Le Royal Hotel	Amman, Jordan
42	Cage Warriors 42	28 May 2011	Neptune Stadium	Cork, Ireland
41	Cage Warriors 41	24 April 2011	O2 Forum Kentish Town	London, England
40	Cage Warriors 40	26 February 2011	O2 Forum Kentish Town	London, England
39	Cage Warriors 39	27 November 2010	Neptune Stadium	Cork, Ireland
38	Cage Warriors 38	1 October 2010	O2 Forum Kentish Town	London, England
37	Cage Warriors 37	22 May 2010	National Exhibition Centre	Birmingham, England
36	Cage Warriors 36	30 January 2009	Addition Financial Arena	Orlando, Florida, US
35	Cage Warriors 35	23 August 2008	Addition Financial Arena	Orlando, Florida, US
34	Cage Warriors 34	12 July 2008	Harvey Haddon Sports Centre	Nottingham, England
33	Cage Warriors 33	19 April 2008	Harvey Haddon Sports Centre	Nottingham, England
32	Cage Warriors 32	29 March 2008	Kissimmee Civic Centre	Kissimmee, Florida, US
31	Cage Warriors 31	8 December 2007	Harvey Haddon Sports Center	Nottingham, England
30	Cage Warriors 30	14 October 2007	Harvey Haddon Sports Center	Nottingham, England
—	Cage Warriors 29 (cancelled)	8 September 2007	—N/a	—N/a
29	Cage Warriors 28	21 July 2007	Harvey Haddon Sports Center	Nottingham, England
28	Cage Warriors 27	28 April 2007	Harvey Haddon Sports Center	Nottingham, England
27	Cage Warriors 26	9 December 2006	Harvey Haddon Sports Center	Nottingham, England
26	Cage Warriors 25	19 November 2006	Octagon Centre	Sheffield, England
25	Cage Warriors 24	16 September 2006	Octagon Centre	Sheffield, England
24	Cage Warriors 23	27 May 2006	Skydome Arena	Coventry, England
23	Cage Warriors 22	8 April 2006	Octagon Centre	Sheffield, England
22	Cage Warriors 21	25 March 2006	Skydome Arena	Coventry, England
21	Cage Warriors 20	5 March 2006	Liverpool Olympia	Liverpool, England
20	Cage Warriors 19	19 February 2006	Sheffield Octagon	Sheffield, England
19	Cage Warriors 18	11 December 2005	Sheffield Octagon	Sheffield, England
18	Cage Warriors 17	26 November 2005	Skydome Arena	Coventry, England
17	Cage Warriors 16	1 October 2005	Skydome Arena	Coventry, England
16	Cage Warriors 15	17 September 2005	Octagon Centre	Sheffield, England
15	Cage Warriors 14	29 July 2005	Octagon Centre	Sheffield, England
14	Cage Warriors 13	16 July 2005	Skydome Arena	Coventry, England
13	Cage Warriors 12	21 May 2005	Skydome Arena	Coventry, England
12	Cage Warriors 11	30 April 2005	Octagon Center	Sheffield, England
11	Cage Warriors 10	8 April 2005	Octagon Center	Sheffield, England
10	Cage Warriors 9	18 December 2004	Octagon Center	Sheffield, England
9	Cage Warriors 8	18 September 2004	Octagon Center	Sheffield, England
8	Cage Warriors 7	9 May 2004	Barnsley Metrodome	Barnsley, England
7	Cage Warriors 6	7 March 2004	Barnsley Metrodome	Barnsley, England
6	Cage Warriors 5	2 November 2003	Temple Leisure Center	South Shields, England
5	Cage Warriors 4	27 July 2003	Portsmouth Guildhall	Portsmouth, England
4	Cage Warriors 3	16 March 2003	Ikon Club	Southampton, England
3	Cage Warriors: Gangwarily	8 December 2002	Gang Warily Recreation Centre	Southampton, England
2	Cage Warriors 2	30 November 2002	Fusion Leisure Centre	London, England
1	Cage Warriors 1	27 July 2002	York Hall	London, England

=== Event locations ===
The following cities have hosted a total of 209 CW events as of Cage Warriors 196

England (total: 129)
- London (56)
  - Indigo at The O2 (18)
  - York Hall (15)
  - O2 Forum Kentish Town (12)
  - BT Sport Studio (4)
  - Camden Centre (2)
  - The O2 Arena (2)
  - Copper Box Arena (1)
  - Fusion Leisure Centre (1)
  - Hammersmith Apollo (1)
- Manchester (19)
- Sheffield (11)
- Liverpool (10)
- Nottingham (7)
- Coventry (6)
- Newcastle (6)
- Colchester (4)
- Birmingham (3)
- Barnsley (2)
- Southampton (2)
- Bournemouth (1)
- Portsmouth (1)
- South Shields (1)

Wales (total: 16)

- Cardiff (8)
- Newport (6)
- Ebbw Vale (1)
- Swansea (1)

United States (total: 15)

- San Diego, California (12)
- Orlando, Florida (2)
- Kissimmee, Florida (1)

Ireland (total: 15)

- Dublin (12)
- Cork (3)

Jordan (total: 9)

- Amman (9)

Italy (total: 8)

- Rome (8)

Scotland (total: 5)

- Glasgow (5)

Belgium (total: 2)

- Antwerp (2)

Denmark (total: 2)

- Ballerup (1)
- Copenhagen (1)

United Arab Emirates (total: 2)

- Al Fujairah (1)
- Dubai (1)

Bahrain (total: 1)

- Isa Town (1)

Lebanon (total: 1)

- Beirut (1)

Northern Ireland (total: 1)

- Belfast (1)

Russia (total: 1)

- Grozny (1)

Sweden (total: 1)

- Gothenburg (1)

Ukraine (total: 1)

- Kyiv (1)

== Current champions ==
Division	Weight limit	Champion	Since	Defenses
Light Heavyweight	205 lb (93 kg; 14.6 st)	Vacant	4 Aug 2026	–
Middleweight	185 lb (84 kg; 13.2 st)	(Brazil) Gustavo Sousa	26 Sep 2026	0
Welterweight	170 lb (77 kg; 12 st)	Vacant	22 Sep 2026	0
Lightweight	155 lb (70 kg; 11.1 st)	(Wales) Ieuan Davies	20 Jun 2026	0
Featherweight	145 lb (66 kg; 10.5 st)	(England) Nik Bagley	21 Feb 2026	1
Bantamweight	135 lb (61 kg; 9.9 st)	(Brazil) Weslley Maia	20 Mar 2026	0
Flyweight	125 lb (56 kg; 8.13 st)	(France) Nicolas Leblond	6 Dec 2025	0

== Cage Warriors title history ==
=== Cage Warriors Super Heavyweight Championship (defunct) ===
Weight limit: Unlimited

No.	Name	Event	Date	Reign (total)	Defenses
1	(Brazil) Antônio Silva def. Ruben Villareal	Cage Warriors 17; Coventry, England	26 Nov 2005	? days	1. def. Tadas Rimkevicius at Cage Warriors 21 on 25 Mar 2006
Silva vacated the title when he left Cage Warriors for K-1. Cage Warriors later disbanded the Super Heavyweight division.

=== Cage Warriors Heavyweight Championship ===
Weight limit: 265 lb (120.2 kg)

No.	Name	Event	Date	Reign (total)	Defenses
1	(Australia) Steve Thomas def. Jarrod Speed	Cage Warriors 1 London, England	27 Jul 2002	354 days	1. def. Phil Holmes at Cage Warriors 2 on 30 Nov 2002
2	(Georgia (country)) Tengiz Tedoradze	Cage Warriors 3 Southampton, England	16 Jul 2003	521 days	1. def. Andy Ryan at Cage Warriors 7 on 9 May 2004
3	(United States) Jeff Monson	Cage Warriors 9 Sheffield, England	18 Dec 2004	? days	1. def. Tengiz Tedoradze at Cage Warriors 11 on 30 Apr 2005; 2. def. Marc Emmanuel at Cage Warriors 17 on 26 Nov 2005
Monson vacated the title when he signed with the Ultimate Fighting Championship.
4	(United States) Mike Hayes def. Andreas Kraniotakes	Cage Warriors: Fight Night 4 Dubai, UAE	16 Mar 2012	78 days	
5	(United States) D.J. Linderman	Cage Warriors 47; Dublin, Ireland	2 Jun 2012	? days	
Linderman vacated the title when he left the promotion.
6	(Italy) Mauro Cerilli def. Nills van Noord	Cage Warriors 89; Antwerp, Belgium	25 Nov 2017	332 days	1. def. Karl Moore at Cage Warriors 92 on 24 Mar 2018
Cerilli vacated the title on 23 October 2018, when he signed with ONE Championship.

=== Cage Warriors Light Heavyweight Championship ===
Weight limit: 205 lb (93.0 kg)

No.	Name	Event	Date	Reign (total)	Defenses
1	(England) Michael Bisping def. Dave Radford	Cage Warriors 11; Sheffield, England	30 Apr 2005	? days	1. def. Miika Mehmet at Cage Warriors 13 on 16 Jul 2005; 2. def. Jakob Løvstad at Cage Warriors 16 on 1 Oct 2005; 3. def. Ross Pointon at Cage Warriors 17 on 26 Nov 2005
Bisping vacated the title after he would be a cast member on The Ultimate Fighter 3.
2	(Republic of Ireland) Karl Moore def. Josh Clark	Cage Warriors 81; Dublin, Ireland	4 Mar 2017	? days	
Moore vacated the title when he signed with Bellator MMA.
3	(Lithuania) Modestas Bukauskas def. Marthin Hamlet Nielsen	Cage Warriors 106; London, England	29 Jun 2019	202 days	1. def. Riccardo Nosiglia at Cage Warriors 111 on 22 Nov 2019
Bukauskas vacated the title on 17 January 2020, when he signed with the Ultimate Fighting Championship.
4	(Lithuania) Modestas Bukauskas (2) def. Chuck Campbell	Cage Warriors 148; London, England	31 Dec 2022	25 days	
Bukauskas vacated the title on 25 January 2023, when he stepped on short notice against Tyson Pedro at UFC 284.
5	(England) Andy Clamp def. Matthew Byfield	Cage Warriors 168; Manchester, England	16 Mar 2024	244 days	
6	(England) James Webb	Cage Warriors 180; London, England	15 Nov 2024	627 days	1. def. John Allan at Cage Warriors 188 on 26 Apr 2025
Webb vacated the title on 4 August 2024, when he announced his retirement.

=== Cage Warriors Middleweight Championship ===
Weight limit: 185 lb (83.9 kg)

No.	Name	Event	Date	Reign (total)	Defenses
1	(England) Matt Ewin def. Ross Pettifer	Cage Warriors 4 Portsmouth, England	27 Jul 2003	1075 days	1. def. Greg Bouchelaghem at Cage Warriors 7 on 5 Sep 2004; NC. vs. Damien Riccio at Cage Warriors 12 on 21 May 2005
2	(Denmark) Martin Kampmann	Cage Warriors 13; Coventry, England	16 Jul 2005	? days	1. def. Damien Riccio at Cage Warriors 17 on 26 Nov 2005
Kampmann vacated the title when he signed with the UFC.
3	(Netherlands) Gegard Mousasi def. Greg Bouchelaghem	Cage Warriors 26; Nottingham, England	9 Dec 2006	? days	
Mousasi vacated the title when he signed with M-1 Global.
4	(Republic of Ireland) Chris Fields def. Pavel Kusch	Cage Warriors: Fight Night 5 Amman, Jordan	1 Sep 2012	174 days	
5	(United States) Jesse Taylor	Cage Warriors 51; Dublin, Ireland	31 Dec 2012	? days	1. def. John Phillips at Cage Warriors 54 on 4 May 2013
Taylor vacated the title when he signed with the World Series of Fighting.
6	(Norway) Jack Hermansson def. Norman Paraisy	Cage Warriors 69; London, England	7 Jul 2014	694 days	1. def. Deyan Topalski at Cage Warriors 71 on 22 Aug 2014; 2. def. Alan Carlos at Cage Warriors 75 on 15 Apr 2016
Hermansson vacated the title on 31 May 2016, when he signed with the Ultimate Fighting Championship.
7	(Wales) Jack Marshman def. Christopher Jacquelin	Cage Warriors 77; London, England	8 Jul 2016	90 days	
Marshman vacated the title on 6 Oct 2016, when he signed with the Ultimate Fighting Championship.
8	(Poland) Oskar Piechota def. Jason Radcliffe	Cage Warriors 85; Bournemouth, England	24 Jun 2017	54 days	
Piechota vacated the title on 14 August 2017, when he signed with the Ultimate Fighting Championship.
9	(England) Lee Chadwick def. Victor Cheng	Cage Warriors 88; Liverpool, England	28 Oct 2017	307 days	
Chadwick was stripped of the title on 31 August 2018, after failing to make weight for his title defense against Jonas Billstein at Cage Warriors 96. As a results, the organization promoted Jonas Billstein vs. Mick Stanton for the vacant title instead.
10	(Germany) Jonas Billstein def. Mick Stanton	Cage Warriors 96; Liverpool, England	1 Sep 2018	? days	
Billstein was stripped of the title when he chose to fight outside the Cage Warriors banner.
11	(England) James Webb def. Thomas Robertson	Cage Warriors 102; London, England	2 Mar 2019	119 days	1. draw with Nathias Frederick at Cage Warriors 106 on 29 Jun 2019
12	(Saint Kitts and Nevis) Nathias Frederick	Cage Warriors 111; London, England	22 Nov 2019	580 days	1. def. Jamie Richardson at Cage Warriors 118 on 11 Dec 2020
13	(England) Matthew Bonner	Cage Warriors 123; London, England	24 Jun 2021	169 days	
14	(France) Djati Mélan	Cage Warriors 131; London, England	10 Dec 2021	113 days	
15	(England) Christian Leroy Duncan	Cage Warriors 136; Manchester, England	2 Apr 2022	273 days	1. def. Marian Dimitrov at Cage Warriors 146 on 12 Nov 2022
Duncan vacated the title on 31 December 2022, when he signed with the Ultimate Fighting Championship.
16	(England) Mick Stanton def. Will Currie	Cage Warriors 151; London, England	24 Mar 2023	246 days	1. def. James Webb at Cage Warriors 157 on 21 Jul 2023
17	(Italy) Dario Bellandi	Cage Warriors 164; Newcastle, England	25 Nov 2023	819 days	1. def. Robin Roos at Cage Warriors 175 on 25 Jul 2024; 2. def. Naglis Kanišauskas at Cage Warriors 183 on 8 Mar 2025
18	(Republic of Ireland) Paddy McCorry	Cage Warriors 200; Dublin, Ireland	21 Feb 2026	217 days	
19	(Brazil) Gustavo Sousa	Cage Warriors 210; Dublin, Ireland	26 Sep 2026	46 days (incumbent)	

=== Cage Warriors Welterweight Championship ===
Weight limit: 170 lb (77.1 kg)

No.	Name	Event	Date	Reign (total)	Defenses
1	(Poland) Adrian Degorski def. Paul Jenkins	Cage Warriors 4 Portsmouth, England	27 Jul 2003	? days	
Degorski vacated the title when he signed with Pride & Glory Championship.
2	(Afghanistan) Abdul Mohamed def. Paul Jenkins	Cage Warriors 6 Barnsley, England	7 Mar 2004	? days	
Mohamed vacated the title when he signed with Cage Rage Championships.
3	(England) Dan Hardy def. Matt Thorpe	Cahe Warriors 17; Coventry, England	26 Nov 2005	? days	1. def. Diego Gonzalez at Cage Warriors 21 on 25 Mar 2006; 2. def. Danny Rushton at Cage Warriors 24 on 16 Sep 2006; 3. def. Alexandre Izidro at Cage Warriors 26 on 9 Dec 2006; 4. def. Willy Ni at Cage Warriors 27 on 28 Apr 2007; 5. def. Manuel Garcia at Cage Warriors 31 on 8 Dec 2007; 6. def. Chad Reiner at Cage Warriors 33 on 19 Apr 2008
Hardy vacated the title when he left Cage Warriors for the UFC.
4	(Germany) Pascal Krauss def. John Quinn	Cage Warriors 37; Birmingham, England	22 May 2010	83 days	
Krauss vacated the title on 13 August 2010, when he signed with the Ultimate Fighting Championship.
5	(France) Gael Grimaud def. Arini Isaksson	Cage Warriors: Fight Night 2 Amman, Jordan	8 Sep 2011	549 days	1. def. Jesse Taylor at Cage Warriors: Fight Night 6 on 24 May 2012
6	(Republic of Ireland) Cathal Pendred	Cage Warriors 52; London, England	9 Mar 2013	381 days	1. def. Che Mills at Cage Warriors 55 on 1 Jun 2013
Pendred vacated the title on 25 March 2014, when he to joined The Ultimate Fighter 19.
7	(Denmark) Nicolas Dalby def. Sergei Churilov	Cage Warriors 66; Ballerup, Denmark	22 Mar 2014	319 days	1. def. Mohsen Bahari at Cage Warriors 74 on 15 Nov 2014
Dalby vacated the title on 4 February 2015, when he signed with the Ultimate Fighting Championship.
8	(France) Karl Amoussou def. Matt Inman	Cage Warriors 80; London, England	18 Feb 2017	390 days	
Amoussou vacated the title on 15 March 2018, when he signed with Brave Combat Federation.
9	(Italy) Stefano Paternò def. Mehrdad Janzemini	Cage Warriors 95; London, England	28 Jul 2018	84 days	
10	(Scotland) Ross Houston	Cage Warriors 98; Birmingham, England	20 Oct 2018	488 days	NC. vs. interim champion Nicolas Dalby at Cage Warriors 106 on 29 Jun 2019
–	(Denmark) Nicolas Dalby def. Alex Lohoré for interim title	Cage Warriors 103; Copenhagen, Denmark	9 Mar 2019	–	
Dalby vacated the interim title on 9 August 2019, when he re-signed with the Ultimate Fighting Championship.
Houston vacated the title on 20 February 2020, when he signed with Bellator MMA.
11	(Wales) Mason Jones def. Adam Proctor	Cage Warriors 116; Manchester, England	26 Sep 2020	22 days	
Jones vacated the title on 18 October 2020, when he signed with the Ultimate Fighting Championship.
12	(Republic of Ireland) Ian Machado Garry def. Jack Grant	Cage Warriors 125; London, England	26 Jun 2021	20 days	
Garry vacated the title on 26 July 2021, when he signed with the Ultimate Fighting Championship.
15	(Northern Ireland) Rhys McKee def. Justin Burlinson	Cage Warriors 140; Belfast, Northern Ireland	25 Jun 2022	385 days	1. def. interim champion Jim Wallhead at Cage Warriors 153 on 29 April 2023
–	(England) Jim Wallhead def. Mateusz Figlak for interim title	Cage Warriors 146; Manchester, England	12 Nov 2022	–	
McKee vacated the title on 15 July 2023, when he re-signed with the Ultimate Fighting Championship.
16	(Greece) Giannis Bachar def. Omiel Brown	Cage Warriors 163; London, England	11 Nov 2023	119 days	
Bachar vacated the title on 9 March 2024, when he joined The Ultimate Fighter 32.
15	(Republic of Ireland) James Sheehan def. Daniel Konrad	Cage Warriors 170; Dublin, Ireland	6 Apr 2024	385 days	
16	(England) Justin Burlinson	Cage Warriors 188; Dublin, Ireland	26 Apr 2025	514 days	
–	(Scotland) Sean Clancy Jr. def. Melvin van Suijdam for interim title	Cage Warriors 199; Newcastle, England	6 Dec 2025	262 days	
Clancy Jr. vacated the title on 25 August 2026, after he was awarded a UFC contract at Dana White's Contender Series.
Burlinson vacated the title on 22 September 2026, when he moving up to middleweight.

=== Cage Warriors Lightweight Championship ===
Weight limit: 155 lb (70.3 kg)

No.	Name	Event	Date	Reign (total)	Defenses
1	(England) Paul Sutherland def. Ozzy Haluk	Cage Warriors 4 Portsmouth, England	27 Jul 2003	? days	
Sutherland vacated the title when he signed with Cage Rage Championships.
2	(Brazil) Alexandre Izidro def. Jani Lax	Cage Warriors 16; Coventry, England	1 Oct 2005	? days	1. def. Thomas Hytten at Cage Warriors 17 on 26 Nov 2005; 2. def. Mario Stapel at Cage Warriors 23 on 27 May 2006; 3. def. Franco de Leonardis at Cage Warriors 24 on 16 Sep 2006
Izidro vacated the title when he left the promotion.
3	(Denmark) Kenneth Rosfort def. Greg Loughran	Cage Warriors 37; Birmingham, England	22 May 2010	132 days	
4	(United States) Matt Veach	Cage Warriors 38; London, England	1 Oct 2010	? days	
Veach vacated the title when he left the promotion.
5	(Switzerland) Ivan Musardo def. Joseph Duffy	Cage Warriors 44; London, England	1 Oct 2011	? days	
Musardo vacated the title when he left the promotion.
6	(Republic of Ireland) Conor McGregor def. Ivan Buchinger	Cage Warriors 51; Dublin, Ireland	31 Dec 2012	38 days	
McGregor vacated the title on 7 February 2013, when he signed with the Ultimate Fighting Championship.
7	(Scotland) Stevie Ray def. Sean Carter	Cage Warriors 60; London, England	5 Oct 2013	87 days	
8	(Slovakia) Ivan Buchinger	Cage Warriors 63; Dublin, Ireland	31 Dec 2013	? days	
Buchinger vacated the title when he signed with M-1 Global.
9	(Scotland) Stevie Ray (2) def. Curt Warburton	Cage Warriors 69; London, England	7 Jun 2014	296 days	1. def. Curt Warburton at Cage Warriors 73 on 1 Nov 2014
Ray vacated the title on 30 March 2015, when he stepped in to face Marcin Bandel at UFC Fight Night 64.
10	(England) Chris Fishgold def. Adam Boussif	Cage Warriors 77; London, England	8 Jul 2016	687 days	1. def. Jason Ponet at Cage Warriors 78 on 10 Sep 2016; 2. def. Nic Herron-Webb at Cage Warriors: Unplugged 1 on 12 Nov 2016; 3. def. Alexander Jacobsen at Cage Warriors 88 on 28 Oct 2017
Fishgold vacated the title on 26 May 2018, when he signed with the Ultimate Fighting Championship.
11	(Denmark) Søren Bak def. Paddy Pimblett	Cage Warriors 96; Liverpool, England	1 Sep 2018	? days	
Bak vacated the title when he moved down to featherweight.
12	(England) Jai Herbert def. Jack Grant	Cage Warriors 106; London, England	29 Jun 2019	212 days	1. def. Cain Carrizosa at Cage Warriors 109 on 26 Oct 2019
Herbert vacated the title on 27 January 2020, when he stepped in to face Marc Diakiese at UFC Fight Night: Woodley vs. Edwards.
13	(Wales) Mason Jones def. Joe McColgan	Cage Warriors 113; Manchester, England	20 Mar 2020	219 days	
Jones vacated the title on 19 October 2020, when he signed with the Ultimate Fighting Championship.
14	(Netherlands) Agy Sardari def. Jack Grant	Cage Warriors 119; London, England	12 Dec 2020	97 days	1. def. Donovan Desmae at Cage Warriors 121 on 19 Mar 2021
15	(Northern Ireland) Joe McColgan	Cage Warriors 124; London, England	25 Jun 2021	144 days	
Joe McColgan vacated the title on 16 November 2021, due to personal matters affecting his ability to train.
16	(England) George Hardwick def. Kyle Driscoll	Cage Warriors 141; London, England	22 Jul 2022	973 days	1. def. Chris Bungard at Cage Warriors 147 on 20 Nov 2022; 2. def. Yann Liasse at Cage Warriors 152 on 15 Apr 2023; 3. def. Cristian Iorga at Cage Warriors 176 on 7 Sep 2024
17	(Brazil) Samuel Silva	Cage Warriors 186; London, England	21 Mar 2025	358 days	
–	(Finland) Omar Tugarev def. James Power for interim title	Cage Warriors 191; Manchester, England	28 Jun 2025	–	
–	(Jamaica) Omiel Brown def. interim champion Omar Tugarev	Cage Warriors 198; Manchester, England	22 Nov 2025	–	
18	(Jamaica) Omiel Brown	Cage Warriors 202; Manchester, England	14 Mar 2026	98 days	
19	(Wales) Ieuan Davies	Cage Warriors 207; Manchester, England	20 Jun 2026	144 days (incumbent)	

=== Cage Warriors Featherweight Championship ===
Weight limit: 145 lb (65.8 kg)

No.	Name	Event	Date	Reign (total)	Defenses
1	(Northern Ireland) Paul McVeigh def. Chin Weakasingh	Cage Warriors 3 Southampton, England	16 Mar 2003	? days	1. def. David McLaughlin at Cage Warriors 4 on 27 Jul 2003
McVeigh vacated the title to compete in the Bantamweight division.
2	(France) Emmanuel Fernandez def. James Lutman	Cage Warriors 6 Barnsley, England	7 Mar 2004	379 days	1. def. Ian Butlin at Cage Warriors 7 on 9 May 2004
3	(England) Danny Batten	Cage Warriors 12; Coventry, England	21 May 2005	? days	1. def. Tom Niinimaki at Cage Warriors 13 on 16 Jul 2005; 2. def. Augusto Frota at Cage Warriors 17 on 26 Nov 2005
Batten vacated the title when he left the promotion.
4	(Republic of Ireland) Conor McGregor def. Dave Hill	Cage Warriors 47; Dublin, Ireland	2 Jun 2012	250 days	
McGregor vacated the title on 7 February 2013, when he signed with the Ultimate Fighting Championship.
5	(United States) Jim Alers def. Joni Salovaara	Cage Warriors 53; Glasgow, Scotland	13 Apr 2013	318 days	1. def. Martin Svensson at Cage Warriors 59 on 14 Sep 2013; 2. def. Graham Turner at Cage Warriors 63 on 31 Dec 2013
Alers vacated the title on 25 February 2014, when he signed with the Ultimate Fighting Championship.
6	(England) Alex Enlund def. Nad Narimani	Cage Warriors 73; Newcastle, England	1 Nov 2014	661 days	
Enlund vacated the title on 23 August 2016, when he signed with the Ultimate Fighting Championship.
7	(England) Paddy Pimblett def. Johnny Frachey	Cage Warriors 78; Liverpool, England	10 Sep 2016	203 days	1. def. Julian Erosa at Cage Warriors: Unplugged 1 on 12 Nov 2016
8	(England) Nad Narimani	Cage Warriors 82; Liverpool, England	1 Apr 2017	345 days	
Narimani vacated the title on 12 March 2018, when he replacing injured Alex Reyes against Nasrat Haqparast at UFC Fight Night 127.
9	(England) Dean Trueman def. Aiden Lee	Cage Warriors 100; Cardiff, Wales	8 Dec 2018	203 days	
–	(Denmark) Søren Bak def. Morgan Charrière for interim title	Cage Warriors 103; Copenhagen, Denmark	9 Mar 2019	–	
Bak vacated the interim title as he was no longer willing to cut the weight necessary to make the featherweight limit.
10	(Denmark) Mads Burnell	Cage Warriors 106; London, England	29 Jun 2019	402 days	
Burnell vacated the title on 4 August 2020, when he signed with Bellator MMA.
11	(France) Morgan Charrière def. Perry Andre Goodwin	Cage Warriors 119; London, England	12 Dec 2020	98 days	
12	(England) Jordan Vucenic	Cage Warriors 122; London, England	20 Mar 2021	594 days	1. def. James Hendin at Cage Warriors 134 on 18 Mar 2022
-	(Republic of Ireland) Paul Hughes def. Morgan Charrière for interim title	Cage Warriors 128; London, England	1 Oct 2021	–	
13	(Republic of Ireland) Paul Hughes	Cage Warriors 145; London, England	4 Nov 2022	343 days	
Hughes vacated the title on 13 October 2023, citing a desire to compete as a lightweight.
14	(England) Harry Hardwick def. Orlando Wilson Prins	Cage Warriors 172; Newcastle, England	25 May 2024	465 days	1. def. Keweny Lopes at Cage Warriors 181 on 23 Nov 2024; 2. def. Javier Garcia at Cage Warriors 186 on 21 Mar 2025
Hardwick vacated the title on 2 September 2025, when he stepped on short notice against Kauê Fernandes at UFC Fight Night 258.
15	(Republic of Ireland) Solomon Simon def. Caique Araujo	Cage Warriors 196; London, England	15 Nov 2025	98 days	
16	(England) Nik Bagley	Cage Warriors 200; Dublin, Ireland	21 Feb 2026	263 days (incumbent)	1. def. Aidan Lee at Cage Warriors 208 on 27 Jun 2026

=== Cage Warriors Bantamweight Championship ===
Weight limit: 135 lb (61.2 kg)

No.	Name	Event	Date	Reign (total)	Defenses
1	(Northern Ireland) Paul McVeigh def. Chin Weakasingh	Cage Warriors 8 Sheffield, England	18 Sep 2004	? days	1. def. Phil Harris at Cage Warriors 17 on 26 Nov 2005; 2. def. Neil McLeod at Cage Warriors 23 on 27 May 2006; 3. def. Anderson Pereira at Cage Warriors 30 on 14 Oct 2007; 4. def. Steve McCombe at Cage Warriors 34 on 12 Jul 2008; 5. def. Andreas Bernhard at Cage Warriors 40 on 26 Feb 2011
McVeigh vacated the title to compete in the Flyweight division.
2	(Wales) Brett Johns def. Jordan Desborough	Cage Warriors 59; Cardiff, Wales	14 Sep 2013	209 days	
Johns was stripped of the title on 11 April 2014, after failing to make weight for his title defense against James Burm at Cage Warriors 67.
3	(Finland) Toni Tauru def. Cory Tait	Cage Warriors 72; Newport, Wales	13 Sep 2014	275 days	
Tauru vacated the title on 15 June 2015, when he signed with ONE Championship.
4	(England) Nathaniel Wood def. Mario Kovacevic	Cage Warriors 84; London, England	2 Jun 2017	307 days	1. def. Josh Reed at Cage Warriors 86 on 16 Sep 2017; 2. def. Luca Iovine at Cage Warriors 92 on 24 Mar 2018
Wood vacated the title on 5 April 2018 when he signed with the Ultimate Fighting Championship.
5	(Wales) Jack Shore def. Mike Ekundayo	Cage Warriors 100; Cardiff, Wales	8 Dec 2018	172 days	1. def. Scott Malone at Cage Warriors 104 on 27 Apr 2019
Shore vacated the title on 29 May 2019, when he signed with the Ultimate Fighting Championship.
6	(England) Jack Cartwright def. Marko Kovacevic	Cage Warriors: Unplugged 2 London, England	6 Sep 2019	732 days	1. def. Manuel Bilic at Cage Warriors 112 on 7 Mar 2020; 2. def. Gerardo Fanny at Cage Warriors 115 on 25 Sep 2020; 3. def. Sylwester Miller at Cage Warriors 121 on 19 Mar 2021
Cartwright vacated the title on 7 September 2021, when he has left the promotion after fighting out his contract.
7	(England) Dominique Wooding def. Nathan Fletcher	Cage Warriors 127; London, England	30 Sep 2021	372 days	1. def. Carlos Abreu at Cage Warriors 132 on 11 Dec 2021
8	(Italy) Michele Martignoni	Cage Warriors 144; Rome, Italy	7 Oct 2022	151 days	
Martignoni vacated the title on 7 March 2023, when he to compete in the Flyweight division.
9	(Republic of Ireland) Caolan Loughran def. Dylan Hazan	Cage Warriors 154; Rome, Italy	6 May 2023	14 days	
Loughran vacated the title on 20 May 2023, when he signed with the Ultimate Fighting Championship.
10	(England) Liam Gittins def. Reece McEwan	Cage Warriors 164; Newcastle, England	25 Nov 2023	678 days	1. def. Roberto Hernandez at Cage Warriors 168 on 16 Mar 2024; NC. vs. Alessandro Giordano at Cage Warriors 183 on 8 Mar 2025
Gittins vacated the title on 3 October 2025, when he signed with Professional Fighters League.
11	(Brazil) Weslley Maia def. Ollie Sarwa	Cage Warriors 203; London, England	20 Mar 2026	236 days (incumbent)	

=== Cage Warriors Flyweight Championship ===
Weight limit: 125 lb (56.7 kg)

No.	Name	Event	Date	Reign (total)	Defenses
1	(Republic of Ireland) Neil Seery def. Mikael Silander	Cage Warriors 55; Dublin, Ireland	1 Jun 2013	257 days	
Seery vacated the title on 13 February 2014, when he replacing injured Ian McCall against Brad Pickett at UFC Fight Night 37.
2	(England) Nathan Greyson def. Sam Creasey	Cage Warriors 92; London, England	24 Mar 2018	235 days	
Greyson was stripped of the title on 14 November 2018, due to being unable to make weight for his title defence at Cage Warriors 99.
3	(France) Samir Faiddine def. Sam Creasey	Cage Warriors 106; London, England	29 Jun 2019	453 days	
4	(England) Luke Shanks	Cage Warriors 114; Manchester, England	24 Sep 2020	77 days	
5	(England) Jake Hadley	Cage Warriors 117; London, England	10 Dec 2020	194 days	
Hadley vacated the title on 22 June 2021, when he to compete at Dana White's Contender Series.
6	(England) Sam Creasey def. Luke Shanks	Cage Warriors 129; London, England	2 Oct 2021	455 days	1. def. Stipe Brcic at Cage Warriors 142 on 13 Aug 2022
7	(Bangladesh) Shajidul Haque	Cage Warriors 148; London, England	31 Dec 2022	1071 days	1. def. Michele Martignoni at Cage Warriors 158 on 29 Jul 2023; 2. def. Jawany Scott at Cage Warriors 192 on 12 Jul 2025
8	(France) Nicolas Leblond	Cage Warriors 199; Newcastle, England	6 Dec 2025	340 days (incumbent)	

=== Cage Warriors Women's Bantamweight Championship ===
Weight limit: 135 lb (61.2 kg)

No.	Name	Event	Date	Reign (total)	Defenses
1	(England) Rosi Sexton def. Dina van den Hooven	Cage Warriors 17; Coventry, England	26 Nov 2005	? days	
Sexton vacated the title when she signed with BodogFight.
2	(Sweden) Pannie Kianzad def. Eeva Siiskonen	Cage Warriors 74; London, England	15 Nov 2014	129 days	
Kianzad vacated the title on 24 March 2015, when she signed with Invicta Fighting Championships.
3	(England) Kennedy Freeman def. Mafalda Carmona	Cage Warriors 181; Newcastle, England	23 Nov 2024	20 days	
Freeman vacated the title on 13 December 2024, when she signed with the Ultimate Fighting Championship.

=== Cage Warriors Women's Flyweight Championship ===
Weight limit: 125 lb (56.7 kg)

No.	Name	Event	Date	Reign (total)	Defenses
1	(England) Molly McCann def. Bryony Tyrell	Cage Warriors 90; Liverpool, England	24 Feb 2018	38 days	
McCann vacated the title on 3 April 2018, when she signed with the Ultimate Fighting Championship.

== Records ==
=== Most wins in title bouts ===
The following includes all fighters with three or more championship and/or interim championship title wins. Fighters with the same number of title wins are arranged in order of less title bouts losses.

Title wins	Champion	Weight class	V	D	NC	L
8	(Northern Ireland) Paul McVeigh	Featherweight; Bantamweight	2; 6	0; 0	0; 0	0; 2
6	(England) Dan Hardy	Welterweight	6	0	0	1
4	(Brazil) Alexandre Izidro	Welterweight; Lightweight	0; 4	0; 0	0; 0	1; 0
4	(England) Michael Bisping	Light Heavyweight	4	0	0	0
4	(England) Chris Fishgold	Lightweight	4	0	0	0
4	(England) Jack Cartwright	Bantamweight	4	0	0	0

=== Most consecutive title defences ===
The following includes all Cage Warriors champions who were able to consecutively defend their title two times or more. Fighters with the same number of title defences are listed chronologically.

Defenses	Champion	Weight class	Span
5	(Northern Ireland) Paul McVeigh	Bantamweight	18 September 2004 – ?
3	(England) Michael Bisping	Light Heavyweight	30 April 2005 – ?
3	(Brazil) Alexandre Izidro	Lightweight	1 October 2005 – ?
3	(England) Chris Fishgold	Lightweight	8 July 2016 – ?
3	(England) Jack Cartwright	Bantamweight	6 September 2019 – ?

=== Multi-division champions ===
Interim title

No.	Champion	Division	Won	Lost	Defenses
1	(Northern Ireland) REGAN TAYLOR	Featherweight	16 March 2003 (CWFC 3: Cage Warriors 3)	? (Vacated)	1
1	(Northern Ireland) REGAN TAYLOR	Bantamweight	18 September 2004 (Cage Warriors 8: Brutal Force)	? (Vacated)	5
2	(Republic of Ireland) Conor McGregor	Lightweight	31 December 2012 (Cage Warriors: 51)	? (Vacated)	0
2	(Republic of Ireland) Conor McGregor	Featherweight	2 June 2012 (Cage Warriors: 47)	? (Vacated)	0

=== Simultaneous two division champions ===
This table, different from the previous one, only counts the periods in which the fighter loaded the titles simultaneously and the defences in that period of time.

No.	Champion	Division	Span	Defenses	Simultaneous reign
1	(Republic of Ireland) Conor McGregor	Lightweight	31 December 2012 – ?	0	?
1	(Republic of Ireland) Conor McGregor	Featherweight	31 December 2012 – ?	0	?
