= 2006 in Cage Warriors =

Mixed martial arts events

Information
- First date: February 19, 2006
- Last date: December 9, 2006

Events
- Total events: 8

Fights
- Total fights: 76

Chronology
2005 in Cage Warriors	2006 in Cage Warriors	2007 in Cage Warriors

The year 2006 is the fifth year in the history of Cage Warriors, a mixed martial arts promotion based in the United Kingdom. In 2006 Cage Rage Championships held 8 events beginning with, CWFC: Quest 5.

== Events list ==
#	Event title	Date	Arena	Location
27	CWFC: Enter The Rough House	December 9, 2006		Nottingham, England
26	CWFC: Showdown 2	November 19, 2006		Sheffield, England
25	CWFC: Showdown	September 16, 2006		Sheffield, England
24	CWFC: Strike Force 6	May 27, 2006		Coventry, England
23	CWFC: Quest 6	April 8, 2006		Sheffield, England
22	CWFC: Strike Force 5	March 25, 2006		Coventry, England
21	CWFC: Enter the Wolfslair	March 5, 2006		Liverpool, England
20	CWFC: Quest 5	February 19, 2006		Sheffield, England

== CWFC: Quest 5 ==
CWFC: Quest 5 was an event held on February 19, 2006 in Sheffield, England.

=== Results ===
Main Card
Weight class				Method	Round	Time	Notes
	Lee Livingstone	def.	Paul Cooper	Submission (Armbar)	1	2:19
	Richard Taylor	def.	Jake Duckworth	TKO (Knee and Punches)	1	1:58
	Will Burke	def.	Gavin Egan	TKO (Punches)	2	1:30
	Ben Jagger	def.	Samy Burton	TKO (Punches)	1	2:36
	Adel Rohani	def.	Tom Laycock	Decision (Majority)	2	5:00
	Israel Costa	def.	Andy Denny	Submission (Rear-Naked Choke)	3	1:42
	Scott Allott	def.	Anthony Mason	Submission (Arm-Triangle Choke)	1	4:39

== CWFC: Enter the Wolfslair ==
CWFC: Enter the Wolfslair was an event held on March 5, 2006 in Liverpool, England.

=== Results ===
Main Card
Weight class				Method	Round	Time	Notes
	Arni Isaksson	def.	Dennis Siver	Submission (Armbar)	2	4:23
	Mario Neto	def.	Przemyslaw Mysiala	Submission (Choke)	1	4:52
	Dennis Siver	def.	Adrian Degorski	Submission (Armbar)	2	1:59
	Alex Cook	def.	Chris Rice	Decision	3	5:00
	Arni Isaksson	def.	Jeff Cox	KO	1	3:28
	Jay Keiron	vs.	Dorian Lapaj	No Contest	1	0:00
	Bram van Koppen	def.	Adrian Degorski	Submission (Keylock)	1	4:59
	Dennis Siver	def.	Jonas Ericsson	TKO (Punches)	1	0:35
	Thiago Tavares	def.	Daniel Weichel	Submission (Guillotine Choke)	3	4:47
	Arni Isaksson	def.	Peter Angerer	TKO	1	3:30
	Jeff Cox	def.	Hassan Muridi	TKO (Corner Stoppage)	2	5:00

== CWFC: Strike Force 5 ==
CWFC: Strike Force 5 was an event held on March 25, 2006 in Coventry, England.

=== Results ===
Main Card
Weight class				Method	Round	Time	Notes
	Antonio Silva	def.	Tadas Rimkevicius	TKO (Punches)	1	3:22
	Dan Hardy	def.	Diego Gonzalez	TKO (Doctor Stoppage)	3	0:19
	Mario Neto	def.	Markus Hipp	TKO (Punches)	1	0:36
	Hakim Goram	def.	Zsolt Gulyas	Submission (Armbar)	1	1:38
	Jakob Lovstad	def.	Henrique Cesar Nogueira	Submission (Rear-Naked Choke)	3	0:47
	Chris Rice	def.	Dorian Lapaj	Decision (Majority)	3	5:00
	Alex Cook	def.	Marcello Salazar	TKO (Punches)	2	3:02
	David Bielkheden	def.	Steve Dawson	KO (Punches)	1	0:50
	Samy Schiavo	def.	Sami Berik	Submission (Rear-Naked Choke)	1	2:32
	Paul Rodgerson	def.	Aaron Behan	TKO (Punches)	2	1:34
	Jim Wallhead	def.	Henning Svendsen	TKO (Punches)	1	2:06

== CWFC: Quest 6 ==
CWFC: Quest 6 was an event held on April 8, 2006 in Sheffield, England.

=== Results ===
Main Card
Weight class				Method	Round	Time	Notes
	Alex Sandro	def.	Kayvan Fallah	TKO	2	3:50

== CWFC: Strike Force 6 ==
CWFC: Strike Force 6 was an event held on May 27, 2006 in Coventry, England.

=== Results ===
Main Card
Weight class				Method	Round	Time	Notes
	Alexandre Izidro	def.	Mario Stapel	Decision (Majority)	5	5:00
	Peter Angerer	def.	Jim Wallhead	Submission (Arm-Triangle Choke)	1	1:49
	Ross Mason	def.	Jesse-Bjorn Buckler	TKO	1	2:24
	Diego Gonzalez	def.	Arni Isaksson	Decision (Unanimous)	3	5:00
	Bruce Davis	def.	Ben Walker	Submission (Verbal)	1	0:37
	Alex Cook	def.	Chris Rice	Submission (Triangle Choke)	1	1:09
	Allan Lee	def.	Cengiz Dana	TKO	1	3:38
	Andre Balschmieter	def.	Jose Marcello	TKO	1	3:08
	Paul McVeigh	def.	Neil McLeod	TKO	2	3:27
	Daniel Weichel	def.	Josenildo Ramalho	Decision (Majority)	3	5:00
	Franco de Leonardis	def.	Mark Spencer	Submission (Triangle Choke)	1	0:40
	Mick Sinclair	def.	Jay Gilbey	TKO	1	4:34

== CWFC: Showdown ==
CWFC: Showdown was an event held on September 16, 2006 in Sheffield, England.

=== Results ===
Main Card
Weight class				Method	Round	Time	Notes
	Dan Hardy	def.	Danny Rushton	TKO (Retirement)	1	5:00
	Alexandre Izidro	def.	Franco de Leonardis	Decision (Majority)	5	5:00
	Ian Butlin	def.	Phil Raeburn	Submission (Rear-Naked Choke)	1	1:06
	Thiago Goncalves	def.	Matt Ewin	Decision (Unanimous)	3	5:00
	Sami Berik	def.	Peter Irving	Submission (Rear-Naked Choke)	1	4:15
	Andre Winner	def.	Paul Cooper	Submission (Triangle Choke)	2	1:50
	Matt Thorpe	def.	Peter Angerer	TKO (Submission to punches)	1	1:47
	Marcello Salazar	vs.	Paul Jenkins	Draw (Majority)	3	5:00
	Karl Amoussou	def.	Lee Chadwick	Submission (Rear-Naked Choke)	1	0:31
	Spencer Dummer	def.	Kent Cooper	Submission (Guillotine Choke)	1	0:49
	Matt Hasland	def.	Chris Taylor	Decision (Unanimous)	2	5:00
	Tamai Harding	def.	Wesley Scarrett	TKO (Punches)	1	1:00

== CWFC: Showdown 2 ==
CWFC: Showdown 2 was an event held on November 19, 2006 in Sheffield, England.

=== Results ===
Main Card
Weight class				Method	Round	Time	Notes
	Tomonari Kanomata	def.	Jarkko Latomaki	Submission (Triangle Choke)	1	1:13
	Ivan Serati	def.	Riciardas Zlatkus	TKO (Punches)	1	0:45
	Francesco Ligato	def.	Richard Taylor	Submission (Kimura)	2	1:35
	Tomonari Kanomata	def.	Peter Irving	TKO (Punches)	2	3:36
	Jarkko Latomaki	def.	Ian Butlin	Submission (Rear-Naked Choke)	1	3:21
	Andy Denny	def.	Aaron Behan	TKO (Punches)	1	1:27
	James Whiston	def.	Kent Cooper	TKO (Punches)	1	2:22
	Peter Irving	def.	Mick Sinclair	Submission (Rear-Naked Choke)	2	3:46
	Tomonari Kanomata	def.	Bryan Cohen	TKO (Punches)	1	0:57
	Jarkko Latomaki	def.	Thomas Hytten	Decision (Unanimous)	2	5:00
	Ian Butlin	def.	Emmanuel Geay	KO (Knee)	1	3:39

== CWFC: Enter The Rough House ==
CWFC: Enter The Rough House was an event held on December 9, 2006 in Nottingham, England.

=== Results ===
Main Card
Weight class				Method	Round	Time	Notes
	Dan Hardy	def.	Alexandre Izidro	TKO (Punches)	3	4:56
	Wayne Buck	def.	William Coonie	KO (Punch)	1	1:55
	Gegard Mousasi	def.	Gregory Bouchelaghem	TKO (Submission to punches)	1	2:20
	Dennis Siver	def.	Jim Wallhead	Submission (Armbar)	2	3:31
	Przemyslaw Mysiala	def.	Chris Cooper	Submission (Arm-Triangle Choke)	1	0:33
	Christian Smith	def.	Michael Turner	TKO (Submission to punches)	1	1:51
	Steve Tetley	def.	Denas Banevicius	Submission (Guillotine Choke)	1	1:34
	Rob Askew	def.	Victor Aniolek	TKO (Punches)	1	1:13
	Tamai Harding	def.	Dave Campos	TKO (Punches)	1	2:27
	Clifford Hall	def.	Matt Hasland	Submission (Rear-Naked Choke)	1	2:01
	Wayne Murrie	def.	Dean Amasinger	TKO (Punches)	2	0:11
