= 2004 in Cage Warriors =

Mixed martial arts events

Information
- First date: March 7, 2004
- Last date: December 18, 2004

Events
- Total events: 4

Fights
- Total fights: 28

Chronology
2003 in Cage Warriors	2004 in Cage Warriors	2005 in Cage Warriors

The year 2004 is the third year in the history of Cage Warriors, a mixed martial arts promotion based in the United Kingdom. In 2004 Cage Rage Championships held 4 events beginning with, Cage Warriors 6: Elimination.

== Events list ==
#	Event title	Date	Arena	Location
10	Cage Warriors 9: Xtreme Xmas	December 18, 2004		Sheffield, England
9	Cage Warriors 8: Brutal Force	September 18, 2004		Sheffield, England
8	Cage Warriors 7: Showdown	May 9, 2004		Barnsley, England
7	Cage Warriors 6: Elimination	March 7, 2004		Barnsley, England

== Cage Warriors 6: Elimination ==
Cage Warriors 6: Elimination was an event held on March 7, 2004 in Barnsley, England.

=== Results ===
Main Card
Weight class				Method	Round	Time	Notes
	Abdul Mohamed	def.	Paul Jenkins	TKO	1	4:18
	Emmanuel Fernandez	def.	James Lutman	Submission (Triangle Choke)	2	3:59
	Ian Jones	def.	Sandy Geddes	Submission (Rear Naked Choke)	1	2:42
	Andy Walker	def.	Lewis Ribbiro	TKO (Corner Stoppage)	2	5:00
	Alex Owen	def.	Chris Freeborn	TKO	2	0:31
	Gavin Bradley	def.	Marvin Li	Submission (Armbar)	1	3:21
	Oliver Ellis	def.	Matt Thorpe	Submission (Choke)	1	4:11

== Cage Warriors 7: Showdown ==
Cage Warriors 7: Showdown was an event held on May 9, 2004 in Barnsley, England.

=== Results ===
Main Card
Weight class				Method	Round	Time	Notes
	Emmanuel Fernandez	def.	Ian Butlin	Submission (Triangle Choke)	1	4:55
	Tengiz Tedoradze	def.	Andy Ryan	TKO (Punches)	1	2:05
	Gerald Strebendt	def.	Dave Elliot	Submission (Twister)	1	0:48
	Matt Ewin	def.	Gregory Bouchelaghem	TKO (Corner Stoppage)	4	2:25
	Dave Roche	def.	Gavin Bradley	Submission (Guillotine Choke)	1	1:20
	Lee Doski	def.	Andy Walker	Submission (Armbar)	1	3:06
	Frederic Fernandez	def.	Mark Chen	Decision (Unanimous)	3	5:00

== Cage Warriors 8: Brutal Force ==
Cage Warriors 8: Brutal Force was an event held on September 18, 2004 in Sheffield, England.

=== Results ===
Main Card
Weight class				Method	Round	Time	Notes
	Paul Daley	def.	Paul Jenkins	TKO (Punches)	2	2:56
	Tengiz Tedoradze	def.	Craig Amer	TKO (Submission to punches)	1	0:23
	Dan Hardy	def.	Andy Melia	TKO (Submission to punches)	2	3:55
	Ian Jones	def.	Chris Rice	Submission (Rear-Naked Choke)	1	1:49
	Paul McVeigh	def.	Chin Weakasingh	TKO (Submission to elbows)	4	3:28
	Tom Blackledge	def.	Neil Hall	TKO (Elbows)	1	2:30
	Oliver Ellis	def.	Mark Spencer	Decision (Unanimous)	3	5:00

== Cage Warriors 9: Xtreme Xmas ==
Cage Warriors 9: Xtreme Xmas was an event held on December 18, 2004 in Sheffield, England.

=== Results ===
Main Card
Weight class				Method	Round	Time	Notes
	Jeff Monson	def.	Tengiz Tedoradze	Submission (Rear-Naked Choke)	1	3:51
	Abdul Mohamed	vs.	Paul Daley	Draw	5	5:00
	Gesias Cavalcante	def.	Cengiz Dana	Submission (Guillotine Choke)	3	4:55
	Ian Jones	def.	Michel Hobbs	Submission (Guillotine Choke)	1	3:10
	Tom Niinimaki	def.	Andre Soares	Decision (Unanimous)	3	5:00
	Alex Owen	def.	Frederic Fernandez	Decision (Unanimous)	3	5:00
	Dan Hardy	def.	Aaron Barrow	KO (Head Kick and Punches)	1	0:13

== See also ==
- Cage Warriors
