= 2008 in Cage Warriors =

Mixed martial arts events

Information
- First date: March 29, 2008
- Last date: August 23, 2008

Events
- Total events: 4

Fights
- Total fights: 40

Chronology
| 2007 in Cage Warriors | 2008 in Cage Warriors | 2009 in Cage Warriors |

The year 2008 is the seventh year in the history of Cage Warriors, a mixed martial arts promotion based in the United Kingdom. In 2008 Cage Rage Championships held 4 events beginning with, Cage Warriors: USA Battle Royale.

== Events list ==
| # | Event Title | Date | Arena | Location |
|---|---|---|---|---|
| 35 | Cage Warriors: USA Unleashed | August 23, 2008 | | Orlando, United States |
| 34 | Cage Warriors: Enter the Rough House 7 | July 12, 2008 | | Nottingham, England |
| 33 | Cage Warriors: Enter the Rough House 6 | April 19, 2008 | | Nottingham, England |
| 32 | Cage Warriors: USA Battle Royale | March 29, 2008 | | Kissimmee, United States |

== Cage Warriors: USA Battle Royale ==
Cage Warriors: USA Battle Royale was an event held on March 29, 2008 in Kissimmee, United States.

=== Results ===
Main Card
| Weight class | | | | Method | Round | Time | Notes |
|---|---|---|---|---|---|---|---|
| | Charles Blanchard | def. | Jim Wallhead | Decision (Unanimous) | 3 | 5:00 |
| | Greg Loughran | def. | Jonathan Brookins | Decision (Split) | 3 | 5:00 |
| | Mark Anthony Serkez | def. | Tony Sousa | Decision (Unanimous) | 3 | 5:00 |
| | Bruce Connors | def. | Chino Duran | Submission (Guillotine Choke) | 1 | 1:54 |
| | James Brasco | def. | Gareth Joseph | Decision (Split) | 3 | 5:00 |
| | Brian Eckstein | def. | Farkhad Sharipov | Decision (Split) | 3 | 5:00 |
| | Joe Robinson | def. | Rinaldo Santos | TKO (Doctor Stoppage) | 2 | 5:00 |
| | Kevin Abrante | def. | Justin Smith | Decision (Unanimous) | 3 | 5:00 |
| | Justin Flood | def. | Jeff Savoy | Submission (Toe Hold) | 1 | 2:17 |

== Cage Warriors: Enter the Rough House 6 ==
Cage Warriors: Enter the Rough House 6 was an event held on April 19, 2008 in Nottingham, England.

=== Results ===
Main Card
| Weight class | | | | Method | Round | Time | Notes |
|---|---|---|---|---|---|---|---|
| | Dan Hardy | def. | Chad Reiner | TKO (Punches) | 3 | 2:10 |
| | Cengiz Dana | def. | Ian Butlin | Submission (Heel Hook) | 1 | 0:25 |
| | Bendy Casimir | def. | Andre Winner | Decision (Majority) | 3 | 5:00 |
| | Matt Thorpe | def. | Mark O'Toole | Submission (Kimura) | 1 | 1:31 |
| | Martin Stapleton | def. | David Johnson | Decision (Unanimous) | 3 | 5:00 |
| | Jim Wallhead | def. | Tom Haddock | TKO (Submission to punches) | 2 | 3:49 |
| | Dean Amasinger | def. | Jason Muldoon | Submission (Kimura) | 1 | 4:19 |
| | Clifford Hall | def. | Nigel Whitear | Submission (Guillotine Choke) | 1 | 0:32 |
| | Lee Livingstone | def. | Adam Bairstow | Submission (Rear Naked Choke) | 1 | 0:56 |
| | Eugene Fadiora | def. | Dave Bownds | Submission (Rear-Naked Choke) | 1 | 2:39 |
| | Peter McGurk | def. | Richard Whitmore | KO (Punch) | 1 | 1:43 |

== Cage Warriors: Enter the Rough House 7 ==
Cage Warriors: Enter the Rough House 7 was an event held on July 12, 2008 in Nottingham, England.

=== Results ===
Main Card
| Weight class | | | | Method | Round | Time | Notes |
|---|---|---|---|---|---|---|---|
| | Paul Daley | def. | Bojan Kosednar | KO (Punch) | 1 | 4:53 |
| | Simeon Thoresen | def. | Matt Thorpe | Submission (Kimura) | 1 | 0:51 |
| | Jim Wallhead | def. | Fabricio Nascimento | Decision (Unanimous) | 3 | 5:00 |
| | Paul McVeigh | def. | Steve McCombe | Submission (Rear Naked Choke) | 2 | 2:37 |
| | Abdul Mohamed | vs. | Andre Winner | Draw | 3 | 5:00 |
| | Matteo Minonzio | def. | Wayne Buck | TKO (Doctor Stoppage) | 1 | 3:34 |
| | Lee Livingstone | def. | Wayne Murrie | Submission (Triangle Choke) | 1 | 1:32 |
| | Clifford Hall | def. | Rocci Williams | Submission (Guillotine Choke) | 1 | 2:24 |
| | Chris Cooper | def. | Tommy Rasmussen | TKO (Punches) | 1 | 4:33 |
| | Eddie Podolski | def. | John Brotherhood | Submission (Rear-Naked Choke) | 1 | 2:08 |
| | Peter McGurk | def. | John Phillips | Submission (Armbar) | 1 | 1:05 |

== Cage Warriors: USA Unleashed ==
Cage Warriors: USA Unleashed was an event held on August 23, 2008 in Orlando, United States.

=== Results ===
Main Card
| Weight class | | | | Method | Round | Time | Notes |
|---|---|---|---|---|---|---|---|
| | Mikey Gomez | def. | Charles Blanchard | Submission (Triangle Choke) | 1 | 2:01 |
| | Gareth Joseph | def. | Mark Anthony Serkez | Decision (Unanimous) | 3 | 5:00 |
| | Glenn Mincer | def. | Daniel Thomas | KO (Knee) | 3 | 0:37 |
| | Robert Goodridge | def. | Jason Patino | TKO (Doctor Stoppage) | 2 | 1:46 |
| | Bruce Connors | def. | Mike Bruno | TKO (Punches) | 1 | 0:51 |
| | Steve Morgerman | def. | Zach Knight | TKO (Punches) | 2 | 1:13 |
| | Jim Alers | def. | Brandon Ocasio | Submission (Triangle Choke) | 1 | 3:50 |
| | Chris Boffil | def. | Daniel Lovett | Submission (Guillotine Choke) | 1 | 2:20 |
| | Kevin Abrante | def. | John Mena | TKO (Punches) | 2 | 3:04 |

== See also ==
- Cage Warriors
