= 2002 in Cage Warriors =

Mixed martial arts events

Information
- First date: July 27, 2002
- Last date: December 8, 2002

Events
- Total events: 3

Fights
- Total fights: 32

Chronology
2002 in Cage Warriors	2003 in Cage Warriors

The year 2002 is the first year in the history of Cage Warriors, a mixed martial arts promotion based in the United Kingdom. In 2002 Cage Rage Championships held 3 events beginning with, Cage Warriors: Armageddon.

== Events list ==
#	Event Title	Date	Arena	Location
3	CWFC: Gangwarily	December 8, 2002		Southampton, England
2	CWFC 2: Fists of Fury	November 30, 2002		London, England
1	CWFC 1: Armageddon	July 27, 2002		London, England

== CWFC 1: Armageddon ==
CWFC 1: Armageddon was an event held on July 27, 2002, in London, England.

=== Results ===
Main Card
Weight class				Method	Round	Time	Notes
	Paul Jenkins	def.	Shain Tovell	TKO (Punches)	1	2:40
	Jean Silva	def.	John Waite	Submission (Kimura)	2	3:00
	Rod Phelps	def.	Ray Burns	Decision	2	5:00
	Rosi Sexton	def.	Serena Saunders	Submission (Armbar)	1	0:40
	Matt Ewin	def.	Andy Pay	Submission (Guillotine Choke)	1	1:33
	Simon Holmes	def.	Alessio Sakara	Submission (Rear-Naked Choke)	1	4:50
	Steve Thomas	def.	Jarrod Speed	Submission (Rear-Naked Choke)	1	2:17
	Armin Eslami	def.	Tim Ryder	Submission (Rear-Naked Choke)	1	2:20
	Tom Gerald	def.	Anthony McCrae	Submission (Guillotine Choke)	2	4:57
	Danny Price	vs.	Andy Walker	Draw	2	5:00
	Alessio Sakara	def.	Adam Woolmer	Submission (Kimura)	1	1:27
	Steve Thomas	def.	Mark Klotch	Submission (Kimura)	1	4:30
	Simon Holmes	def.	Mike Ward	TKO (Punches)	1	1:30

== CWFC 2: Fists of Fury ==
CWFC 2: Fists of Fury was an event held on November 30, 2002, in London, England.

=== Results ===
Main Card
Weight class				Method	Round	Time	Notes
	Jorge Rivera	def.	Andy Lagden	Submission (Rear-Naked Choke)	1	N/A
	Chris Munsen	def.	Stuart Dowding	TKO (Submission to punches)	1	N/A
	Terry McDougall	def.	Robert Sarkozi	Submission (Guillotine Choke)	1	N/A
	Atilla Hun	def.	Chris Kerr	TKO (Doctor Stoppage)	1	N/A
	Simon Holmes	def.	Lee Spencer	Submission (Fatigue)	1	N/A
	Dave Elliot	def.	Laszlo Forro	Submission (Armbar)	1	N/A
	Chris Cummins	def.	Jez Marchment	TKO (Punches)	1	N/A
	Steve Thomas	def.	Phil Holmes	Submission (Kimura)	2	N/A
	Jean Silva	def.	Samy Schiavo	Submission (Rear-Naked Choke)	3	N/A
	Andy Cooper	def.	Steve Cooper	KO (Punch)	1	1:37
	Ross Pettifer	def.	Glen Appleby	TKO (Punches)	1	0:37

== CWFC: Gangwarily ==
CWFC: Gangwarily was an event held on December 8, 2002, in Southampton, England.

=== Results ===
Main Card
Weight class				Method	Round	Time	Notes
	Paul Bampton	def.	Barry Ronalds	Submission (Achilles Lock)	1	1:23
	Jez Marchment	def.	Richy Henwood	Decision	3	5:00
	Darrin Richardson	def.	Gary Martin	Submission (Choke)	1	3:01
	Chris Freeborn	def.	Mark Aldridge	Submission (Kneebar)	3	3:40
	Jeff Lawson	def.	Dave Mace	Submission (Armbar)	1	0:42
	Graham Connelly	def.	Nigel Marchment	Submission (Armbar)	1	2:56
	Ian Margerison	def.	Graham Cooke	Submission (Choke)	1	3:20
	Carl Burns	def.	Mark Mitchard	Submission (Armbar)	1	0:00

== See also ==
- Cage Warriors
