= 2005 in Cage Warriors =

Mixed martial arts events

Information
- First date: April 8, 2005
- Last date: December 11, 2005

Events
- Total events: 9

Fights
- Total fights: 64

Chronology
2004 in Cage Warriors	2005 in Cage Warriors	2006 in Cage Warriors

The year 2005 is the fourth year in the history of Cage Warriors, a mixed martial arts promotion based in the United Kingdom. In 2005, Cage Warriors Fighting Championship held 9 events beginning with, CWFC - Quest 1.

== Events list ==
#	Event title	Date	Arena	Location
19	CWFC: Quest 4	December 11, 2005		Sheffield, England
18	CWFC: Strike Force 4	November 26, 2005		Coventry, England
17	CWFC: Strike Force 3	October 1, 2005		Coventry, England
16	CWFC: Quest 3	September 17, 2005		Sheffield, England
15	CWFC: Quest 2	July 29, 2005		Sheffield, England
14	CWFC: Strike Force 2	July 16, 2005		Coventry, England
13	CWFC: Strike Force	May 21, 2005		Coventry, England
12	CWFC: Ultimate Force	April 30, 2005		Sheffield, England
11	CWFC: Quest 1	April 8, 2005		Sheffield, England

== CWFC: Quest 1 ==
CWFC: Quest 1 was an event held on April 8, 2005 in Sheffield, England.

=== Results ===
Main Card
Weight class				Method	Round	Time	Notes
	Dan Hardy	def.	Andy Walker	TKO (Punches)	1	3:26
	Jim Wallhead	def.	Steve Mathews	Submission (Rear-Naked Choke)	1	N/A

== CWFC: Ultimate Force ==
CWFC: Ultimate Force was an event held on April 30, 2005 in Sheffield, England.

=== Results ===
Main Card
Weight class				Method	Round	Time	Notes
	Jeff Monson	def.	Tengiz Tedoradze	Submission (Rear Naked Choke)	1	1:59
	Michael Bisping	def.	Dave Radford	TKO	1	2:46
	Mohamed El-Aouji	def.	Danny Batten	Decision (Unanimous)	3	5:00
	Ian Jones	def.	Michael Holmes	Submission (Guillotine Choke)	3	0:37
	Alexandre Izidro	def.	Yohan Quoniam	Submission (Guillotine Choke)	1	0:51
	Jim Wallhead	def.	Leslee Ojugbana	Submission (Rear-Naked Choke)	1	1:20
	Steve Dawson	def.	Jason Ball	Submission (Triangle Choke)	1	1:37
	Neil Coleman	def.	Andy Melia	TKO	1	3:57
	Jimmy Gains	def.	Steve Mathews	Submission (Rear Naked Choke)	1	1:07
	Gav Keane	def.	Sam Bradley	Submission (Rear Naked Choke)	1	1:11
	Simon Boulter	def.	David Reilly	Submission (Armbar)	1	3:07

== CWFC: Strike Force ==
CWFC: Strike Force was an event held on May 21, 2005 in Coventry, England.

=== Results ===
Main Card
Weight class				Method	Round	Time	Notes
	Marc Emmanuel	def.	Barrington Patterson	KO (Punch)	1	4:27
	Damien Riccio	def.	Matt Ewin	No Contest (Accidental Cut)	2	4:04
	Antonio Silva	def.	Marcus Tchinda	TKO (Submission to punches)	1	3:03
	Gregory Bouchelaghem	def.	Ross Pointon	Submission (Rear-Naked Choke)	1	4:10
	Danny Batten	def.	Emmanuel Fernandez	Submission (Triangle Choke)	2	2:18
	David Baron	def.	Dan Hardy	Submission (Triangle Choke)	3	3:10
	Boris Jonstomp	def.	Jim Wallhead	Submission (Neck Crank)	1	4:20
	Bendy Casimir	def.	Dave Swann	Submission (Arm-Triangle Choke)	1	4:07
	Mohamed El-Aouji	def.	Chris Freeborn	Submission (Triangle Choke)	2	1:31

== CWFC: Strike Force 2 ==
CWFC: Strike Force 2 was an event held on July 16, 2005 in Coventry, England.

=== Results ===
Main Card
Weight class				Method	Round	Time	Notes
	Martin Kampmann	def.	Matt Ewin	TKO (Submission to punches)	1	2:45
	Wagner da Conceicao Martins	def.	Rafal Dabrowski	KO (Punch)	2	2:04
	Leigh Remedios	vs.	Emmanuel Fernandez	Draw	3	5:00
	Nelson Semedo	def.	Ross Mason	TKO (Doctor Stoppage)	2	1:49
	Michael Bisping	def.	Miika Mehmet	TKO (Corner Stoppage)	1	3:01
	Levente Varga	def.	David Brown	Decision (Split)	3	5:00
	Moise Rimbon	def.	Henrique Cesar Nogueira	TKO (Punches)	2	0:30
	Danny Batten	def.	Tom Niinimaki	Decision (Majority)	5	5:00
	Thomas Valentin	def.	Ross Pointon	Submission (Kimura)	2	2:07
	Dan Hardy	def.	Lautaro Arborelo	TKO (Punches)	3	3:52
	Gregory Bouchelaghem	def.	Robert Mitchell	Submission (Rear-Naked Choke)	2	3:41
	Mickey Whitty	def.	Toni Vivas	TKO (Punches)	1	4:49

== CWFC: Quest 2 ==
CWFC: Quest 2 was an event held on July 29, 2005 in Sheffield, England.

=== Results ===
Main Card
Weight class				Method	Round	Time	Notes
	Chris Rice	def.	Jim Wallhead	TKO (Punches)	1	3:32
	Kayvan Fallah	def.	Andy Walker	TKO (Punches)	1	2:13
	Paul Kelly	def.	Ian McAleese	TKO (Punches)	1	1:21
	Anna Mayne	def.	Natalie Geoffery	Submission (Armbar)	1	1:21
	Scott Allott	def.	Tom Laycock	TKO (Punches)	1	1:28
	Lee Livingstone	def.	Richard Taylor	Submission (Armbar)	2	1:21
	Simon McGoven	def.	Dan Munroe	TKO (Punches)	2	2:10
	Ben Jagger	def.	Steve Tetley	TKO (Punches)	1	3:05

== CWFC: Quest 3 ==
CWFC: Quest 3 was an event held on September 17, 2005 in Sheffield, England.

=== Results ===
Main Card
Weight class				Method	Round	Time	Notes
	Dan Hardy	def.	Sami Berik	Decision (Unanimous)	3	5:00

== CWFC: Strike Force 3 ==
CWFC: Strike Force 3 was an event held on October 1, 2005 in Coventry, England.

=== Results ===
Main Card
Weight class				Method	Round	Time	Notes
	Michael Bisping	def.	Jakob Lovstad	TKO (Submission to strikes)	1	1:10
	Kyle Davis	def.	Kash Singh-Sidhu	TKO	1	3:42
	Diego Gonzalez	def.	Dan Hardy	No Contest	2	1:19
	Tengiz Tedoradze	def.	Tom Blackledge	TKO (Submission to strikes)	1	2:20
	Jim Wallhead	def.	Steve Singh-Sidhu	TKO (Corner Stoppage)	1	3:14
	David Bielkheden	def.	Josenildo Ramalho	Submission (Rear Naked Choke)	1	4:52
	Alexandre Izidro	def.	Jani Lax	Submission (Guillotine Choke)	1	2:58
	Henrique Cesar Nogueira	def.	Marc Goddard	Submission (Guillotine Choke)	1	2:49
	Ross Pointon	def.	Jerome Laulan	Submission (Guillotine Choke)	1	0:36
	Kristian Lexell	def.	Darren Spencer	TKO	1	3:33

== CWFC: Strike Force 4 ==
CWFC: Strike Force 4 was an event held on November 26, 2005 in Coventry, England.

=== Results ===
Main Card
Weight class				Method	Round	Time	Notes
	Antonio Silva	def.	Ruben Villareal	TKO (Punches)	1	3:07
	Jeff Monson	def.	Marc Emmanuel	Submission (Rear-Naked Choke)	1	0:58
	Michael Bisping	def.	Ross Pointon	Submission (Armbar)	1	2:00
	Martin Kampmann	def.	Damien Riccio	Submission (Rear-Naked Choke)	2	1:58
	Dan Hardy	def.	Matt Thorpe	Decision (Split)	5	5:00
	Alexandre Izidro	def.	Thomas Hytten	Decision (Majority)	5	5:00
	Martin Wojcik	def.	Christian Smith	TKO (Punches)	1	2:52
	Danny Batten	def.	Augusto Frota	TKO (Corner Stoppage)	3	5:00
	Paul McVeigh	def.	Phil Harris	Submission (Triangle Choke)	3	1:05
	Rosi Sexton	def.	Dina Van den Hooven	TKO (Corner Stoppage)	3	5:00

== CWFC: Quest 4 ==
CWFC: Quest 4 was an event held on December 11, 2005 in Sheffield, England.

=== Results ===
Main Card
Weight class				Method	Round	Time	Notes
	Kayvan Fallah	def.	Paul Hopkins	N/A	2	0:27

== See also ==
- Cage Warriors
