= 2007 in Cage Warriors =

Mixed martial arts events

Information
- First date: April 28, 2007
- Last date: December 8, 2007

Events
- Total events: 4

Fights
- Total fights: 38

Chronology
2006 in Cage Warriors	2007 in Cage Warriors	2008 in Cage Warriors

The year 2007 is the sixth year in the history of Cage Warriors, a mixed martial arts promotion based in the United Kingdom. In 2007 Cage Rage Championships held 4 events beginning with, CWFC: Enter The Rough House 2.

== Events list ==
#	Event title	Date	Arena	Location
31	Cage Warriors: Enter The Rough House 5	December 8, 2007		Nottingham, England
30	Cage Warriors: Enter The Rough House 4	October 14, 2007		Nottingham, England
29	Cage Warriors: Enter The Rough House 3	July 21, 2007		Nottingham, England
28	Cage Warriors: Enter The Rough House 2	April 28, 2007		Nottingham, England

== CWFC: Enter The Rough House 2 ==
CWFC: Enter The Rough House 2 was an event held on April 28, 2007 in Nottingham, England.

=== Results ===
Main Card
Weight class				Method	Round	Time	Notes
	Wayne Buck	def.	Dawid Cieplinski	TKO (Punches)	1	0:18
	Dan Hardy	def.	Willy Ni	Submission (Guillotine Choke)	2	0:32
	Karl Amoussou	def.	Mark O'Toole	Submission (Rear-Naked Choke)	1	2:38
	Jim Wallhead	def.	Lewis Barrow	TKO (Submission to punches)	2	1:40
	Lee Livingstone	def.	Eduardo Mahal	Decision (Unanimous)	3	5:00
	Greg Loughran	def.	Andre Winner	Technical Submission (Guillotine Choke)	2	3:52
	Christian Smith	def.	Jay Keiron	TKO (Punches)	3	3:53
	Steve Tetley	def.	Cristian Binda	TKO (Punches)	2	0:57
	Chris Cooper	def.	Dylan Tanner	TKO (Punches)	2	0:53
	Edwin Junior	def.	Rob Askew	TKO (Punches)	1	2:19
	Eddie Podolski	def.	Rocci Williams	Decision (Majority)	2	5:00

== CWFC: Enter The Rough House 3 ==
CWFC: Enter The Rough House 3 was an event held on July 21, 2007 in Nottingham, England.

=== Results ===
Main Card
Weight class				Method	Round	Time	Notes
	Paul Kelly	def.	Sami Berik	Submission (Rear-Naked Choke)	1	1:27
	Mark O'Toole	def.	Christian Smith	Submission (Armbar)	1	3:08
	Andre Winner	def.	Daniel Thomas	Decision (Unanimous)	3	5:00
	Matt Thorpe	def.	Vasile Doczi	Submission (Punches)	1	2:09
	Jim Wallhead	def.	Marius Liaukevicius	Technical Submission (Arm-Triangle Choke)	1	2:52
	Henrique Cesar Nogueira	def.	Lee Austin	Submission (Guillotine Choke)	1	3:19
	Aaron Blackwell	def.	Ashley Smith	Decision (Unanimous)	3	5:00
	Lee Livingstone	def.	Kevin Reed	TKO (Knees)	2	1:29
	Dave Bownds	def.	Rob Cooper	TKO (Punches)	1	3:48

== CWFC: Enter The Rough House 4 ==
CWFC: Enter The Rough House 4 was an event held on October 14, 2007 in Nottingham, England.

=== Results ===
Main Card
Weight class				Method	Round	Time	Notes
	Jim Wallhead	def.	Steven Lynch	Submission (Rear-Naked Choke)	1	1:53
	Leslee Ojugbana	def.	Matt Thorpe	TKO (Punches)	2	4:13
	Paul McVeigh	def.	Anderson Pereira	Submission (Triangle Choke)	2	0:53
	Andre Winner	def.	A.J. Wenn	Decision (Unanimous)	3	5:00
	Paddy Doherty	def.	Lee Coville	Submission (Guillotine Choke)	1	0:29
	Lee Livingstone	def.	Marius Buzinskas	Submission (Rear-Naked Choke)	1	3:16
	Mark O'Toole	def.	Lola Bamgbala	Submission (Armbar)	1	3:16
	Peter McGurk	def.	Leeroy Barnes	Decision (Unanimous)	2	5:00
	Darren Moore	def.	Adam Greener	TKO (Punches)	1	1:48
	Dave Bownds	def.	Eddie Podolski	TKO (Punches)	2	1:32

== CWFC: Enter The Rough House 5 ==
CWFC: Enter The Rough House 5 was an event held on December 8, 2007 in Nottingham, England.

=== Results ===
Main Card
Weight class				Method	Round	Time	Notes
	Wayne Buck	def.	Victor Aniolek	Submission (Kimura)	1	0:26
	Dan Hardy	def.	Manuel Garcia	TKO (Submission to punches)	1	2:21
	Chas Jacquier	def.	Mark O'Toole	Submission (Armbar)	1	4:21
	Lukasz Les	def.	Lee Livingstone	Submission (Achilles Lock)	1	2:36
	Dean Amasinger	def.	David Faulkner	DQ (Illegal Heel Hook)	1	3:07
	Ross Pearson	def.	Steve Tetley	Submission (Armbar)	1	4:46
	Chris Cooper	def.	Svajunas Siacuila	TKO (Punches)	1	3:04
	Karsten Lenjoint	def.	Chris Trowton	Submission (Triangle Choke)	1	4:52

== See also ==
- Cage Warriors
