= 2010 in Cage Warriors =

Mixed martial arts events

Information
- First date: May 22, 2010
- Last date: November 27, 2010

Events
- Total events: 3

Fights
- Total fights: 34

Chronology
2009 in Cage Warriors	2010 in Cage Warriors	2011 in Cage Warriors

The year 2010 is the ninth year in the history of Cage Warriors, a mixed martial arts promotion based in the United Kingdom. In 2010 Cage Rage Championships held 3 events beginning with, Cage Warriors 37: Right to Fight.

== Events list ==
#	Event Title	Date	Arena	Location
39	Cage Warriors 39: The Uprising	November 27, 2010		Cork, Ireland
38	Cage Warriors 38: Young Guns	October 1, 2010		London, England
37	Cage Warriors 37: Right to Fight	May 22, 2010		Birmingham, England

== Cage Warriors 37: Right to Fight ==
Cage Warriors 37: Right to Fight was an event held on May 22, 2010 in Birmingham, England.

=== Results ===
Main Card
Weight class				Method	Round	Time	Notes
	Pascal Krauss	def.	John Quinn	Submission (Rear-Naked Choke)	2	4:47
	Kenneth Rosfort-Nees	def.	Greg Loughran	TKO (Doctor Stoppage)	4	3:58
	Mick Sinclair	def.	Josh Dennis	TKO (Punches)	1	1:44
	Peter Irving	def.	Nordin Asrih	Decision (Unanimous)	3	5:00
	Daniel Thomas	def.	Ali Maclean	Submission (Guillotine Choke)	1	3:32
	Jim Wallhead	def.	Shaun Lomas	Submission (Rear-Naked Choke)	1	2:34
	Louis Chapman	def.	Jay Gilbey	KO (Punch)	1	0:26
	Sarah Moras	def.	Helena Martin	TKO (Punches)	2	3:40
	James Bateman	def.	Ronan McKay	Decision (Unanimous)	3	5:00
	Tom Breese	def.	Ramon Silva	Submission (Rear-Naked Choke)	1	2:13

== Cage Warriors 38: Young Guns ==
Cage Warriors 38: Young Guns was an event held on October 1, 2010 in London, England.

=== Results ===
Main Card
Weight class				Method	Round	Time	Notes
	Matt Veach	def.	Kenneth Rosfort-Nees	Decision (Unanimous)	5	5:00
	Jason Young	def.	Sergej Grecicho	Decision (Unanimous)	3	5:00
	Che Mills	def.	Jake Hecht	Decision (Unanimous)	3	5:00
	Adam Edwards	def.	Josh Ramage	Submission (Triangle Choke)	1	3:02
	Danny Batten	def.	Ismael Padavia	Decision (Unanimous)	3	5:00
	Cory Tait	def.	John Brightwell	Submission (Armbar)	1	1:31
	Patrick Vickers	def.	Andre Files	Decision (Unanimous)	2	4:00
	Oliver Battell	def.	George Tidmarsh	TKO (Punches)	1	1:59
	Charlie Watts	def.	Dan Lucas	TKO (Punches)	1	2:15
	Mick Martin	def.	John Wainwright	Decision (Unanimous)	1	5:00
	Max Matsuk	def.	Wez Lucas	Decision (Unanimous)	1	5:00
	Taher Khan	def.	Luke Macauly	Decision (Unanimous)	1	5:00

== Cage Warriors 39: The Uprising ==
Cage Warriors 39: The Uprising was an event held on November 27, 2010 in Cork, Ireland.

=== Results ===
Main Card
Weight class				Method	Round	Time	Notes
	Rosi Sexton	def.	Sally Krumdiack	TKO (Punches)	2	4:07
	Justin Robbins	def.	Declan Williams	Decision (Unanimous)	3	5:00
	Aisling Daly	def.	Molly Helsel	Decision (Unanimous)	3	5:00
	Joseph Duffy	def.	Conor McGregor	Submission (Arm-Triangle Choke)	1	0:38
	Adam Edwards	def.	Martin Begley	Submission (Rear-Naked Choke)	1	4:17
	Cathal Pendred	def.	Jamie Rogers	Decision (Unanimous)	3	5:00
	Vladimir Malko	def.	Tom Sullivan	Submission (Achilles Lock)	1	1:57
	Conor Cooke	def.	Gareth Pugh	TKO (Punches)	1	2:33
	Patrick Vickers	def.	Artem Lobov	Decision (Unanimous)	2	5:00
	Stephen Owens	def.	Graham McCormack	Decision (Unanimous)	2	3:00
	Warren Mitchell	def.	Sean Tobin	Decision (Majority)	2	3:00
	Kristian Reed	def.	James Heelan	Submission (Triangle Armbar)	1	1:34

== See also ==
- Cage Warriors
