= Mickaël Lebout =

French mixed martial arts fighter

- Born: August 16, 1987 (age 39); Paris, France
- Other names: Ragnar
- Height: 5 ft 11 in (1.80 m)
- Weight: 170 lb (77 kg; 12 st)
- Division: Welterweight; Lightweight
- Reach: 73 in (185 cm)
- Fighting out of: Paris, France
- Team: MMA Factory; Team Obyfight
- Years active: 2011–present

Mixed martial arts record
- Total: 39
- Wins: 24
- By knockout: 2
- By submission: 8
- By decision: 14
- Losses: 12
- By knockout: 3
- By decision: 9
- Draws: 2
- No contests: 1

Other information
- Mixed martial arts record from Sherdog

Mickaël Lebout (born August 16, 1987) is a French former mixed martial artist who competed in the Lightweight divisions of Konfrontacja Sztuk Walki, UFC, M-1 Global, and Cage Warriors.

== Mixed martial arts career ==
=== Early career ===
Lebout racked a 13–3 record in the European circuit, claiming PLMMA Welterweight Championship in the process.

=== Ultimate Fighting Championship ===
Lebout signed with the UFC to replace the injured Gasan Umalatov on short notice, and faced Sérgio Moraes at UFC Fight Night 64 on April 11, 2015. Lebout lost the bout via unanimous decision.

He was scheduled to make his sophomore appearance against Jake Matthews at UFC Fight Night 72 on July 18, 2015. However, Matthews withdrew from the bout due to an injury and was replaced by Teemu Packalén. Lebout won the fight via unanimous decision.

Next he faced Stevie Ray at UFC Fight Night 76 on October 24, 2015, losing the bout via unanimous decision. Subsequently, he was released from the promotion.

=== Post-UFC career ===
After the release, Lebout returned to the European circuit, amassing a record of 2–2–1 before taking on Ryan Scope for the vacant BAMMA World Lightweight Championship at BAMMA 33 on December 15, 2017. He lost the fight via split decision.

==== M-1 Global ====
He then signed with M-1 Global, racking a record of 3–1 before challenging Roman Bogatov for the M-1 Global Lightweight Championship at M-1 Challenge 104 on August 30, 2019. He lost the bout via technical knockout stemming from an injury.

==== Other European circuit ====
After the unsuccessful title shot Lebout headlined French MMAGP event against João Bonfim on October 8, 2020. He won the bout via modified omoplata.

Despite signing with ARES FC in June 2020, Lebout was then slated to challenge Bruno Machado for the UAE Warriors Lightweight Championship at UAE Warriors 15 on January 15, 2021. However, Lebout failed to make contracted weight, thus the championship was removed from the bout. Lebout lost the fight via unanimous decision.

Lebout faced Gábor Boráros on September 11, 2021 at OKTAGON 27. He won the bout via unanimous decision.

After winning a bout against Kevin Ruart at Octofight: Volume 4 via split decision, Lebout faced Karl Amoussou on December 8, 2022 at Ares FC 10, winning the bout via unanimous decision.

Lebout faced Laureano Staropoli on April. 7, 2023 at Ares FC 14 for the AFC Interim Welterweight Championship, losing the bout via knockout in round two.

== Championships and accomplishments ==
- PLMMA
  - PLMMA Welterweight Champion (one time; former)
    - One successful title defense

== Mixed martial arts record ==
Professional record breakdown
40 matches	24 wins	13 losses
By knockout	2	3
By submission	8	0
By decision	14	10
Draws	2	
No contests	1	

Res.	Record	Opponent	Method	Event	Date	Round	Time	Location	Notes
Loss	24–13–2 (1)	Amin Ayoub	Decision (unanimous)	KSW 106	May 10, 2025	3	5:00	Lyon, France	Catchweight (159 lb) bout. Fight of the Night
Win	24–12–2 (1)	Romain Debienne	Decision (unanimous)	KSW 101	December 20, 2024	3	5:00	Nanterre, France	
Loss	23–12–2 (1)	Laureano Staropoli	KO (punches)	Ares FC 14	April 7, 2023	2	0:43	Paris, France	For the interim Ares FC Welterweight Championship. Fight of the Night.
Win	23–11–2 (1)	Karl Amoussou	Decision (unanimous)	Ares FC 10	December 8, 2022	3	5:00	Paris, France	
Win	22–11–2 (1)	Kevin Ruart	Decision (split)	Octofight France: Volume 4	May 7, 2022	3	5:00	Marseille, France	
Win	21–11–2 (1)	Gábor Boráros	Decision (unanimous)	Oktagon 27	September 11, 2021	3	5:00	Bratislava, Slovakia	
Loss	20–11–2 (1)	Bruno Machado	Decision (unanimous)	UAE Warriors 15	January 15, 2021	3	5:00	Abu Dhabi, United Arab Emirates	Catchweight (160 lb) bout; Lebout missed weight.
Win	20–10–2 (1)	João Bonfim	Submission (omoplata)	MMA Grand Prix 1	October 8, 2020	1	N/A	Paris, France	Return to Welterweight.
Loss	19–10–2 (1)	Roman Bogatov	TKO (shoulder injury)	M-1 Challenge 104	August 30, 2019	3	5:00	Orenburg, Russia	For the M-1 Global Lightweight Championship.
Win	19–9–2 (1)	Alik Albogachiev	Submission (rear-naked choke)	M-1 Challenge 101	March 30, 2019	2	2:50	Almaty, Kazakhstan	
Win	18–9–2 (1)	Alexey Makhno	Decision (unanimous)	M-1 Challenge 97	September 28, 2018	3	5:00	Kazan, Russia	
Loss	17–9–2 (1)	Pavel Gordeev	Decision (split)	M-1 Challenge 92	May 24, 2018	3	5:00	Saint Petersburg, Russia	
Win	17–8–2 (1)	Sergey Faley	KO (punch)	M-1 Challenge 89	March 10, 2018	1	4:53	Saint Petersburg, Russia	
Loss	16–8–2 (1)	Ryan Scope	Decision (split)	BAMMA 33	December 15, 2017	3	5:00	Newcastle, England	For the vacant BAMMA Lightweight Championship.
Draw	16–7–2 (1)	Marcin Bandel	Draw (majority)	Fight Club Slam 2017	October 7, 2017	3	5:00	Leganes, Spain	
Win	16–7–1 (1)	Rashad Muradov	Decision (unanimous)	Octogone: 1st Edition	May 13, 2017	3	5:00	Marseille, France	
Win	15–7–1 (1)	Mehdi Dakaev	Decision (unanimous)	Gladiator Fighting Arena 5	December 9, 2016	3	5:00	Rouen, France	Catchweight (165 lb) bout.
Loss	14–7–1 (1)	Tim Wilde	Decision (unanimous)	Cage Warriors 78	September 10, 2016	3	5:00	Liverpool, England	
Loss	14–6–1 (1)	Jessin Ayari	Decision (unanimous)	GMC 8	April 16, 2016	3	5:00	Castrop-Rauxel, Germany	Welterweight bout.
Loss	14–5–1 (1)	Stevie Ray	Decision (unanimous)	UFC Fight Night: Holohan vs. Smolka	October 24, 2015	3	5:00	Dublin, Ireland	
Win	14–4–1 (1)	Teemu Packalén	Decision (unanimous)	UFC Fight Night: Bisping vs. Leites	July 18, 2015	3	5:00	Glasgow, Scotland	Lightweight debut.
Loss	13–4–1 (1)	Sérgio Moraes	Decision (unanimous)	UFC Fight Night: Gonzaga vs. Cro Cop 2	April 11, 2015	3	5:00	Kraków, Poland	
Win	13–3–1 (1)	Szymon Dusza	Decision (unanimous)	PLMMA 48	February 20, 2015	3	5:00	Opole, Poland	Defended the PLMMA Welterweight Championship.
Win	12–3–1 (1)	Pawel Zelazowski	Decision (unanimous)	PLMMA 41	October 24, 2014	3	5:00	Legionowo, Poland	Won the PLMMA Welterweight Championship.
Win	11–3–1 (1)	Davy Gallon	TKO (punches)	SHC 10	September 20, 2014	2	N/A	Geneva, Switzerland	
Win	10–3–1 (1)	Albert Odzimkowski	Submission (rear-naked choke)	Pro MMA Challenge: Po Prostu Walcz!	June 27, 2014	1	4:46	Lublin, Poland	Return to Welterweight.
Win	9–3–1 (1)	Jonathan Bosuku	Submission (kneebar)	100% Fight 22	May 30, 2014	1	1:03	Aubervilliers, France	Middleweight debut.
Win	8–3–1 (1)	Dan Rushworth	Decision (split)	OMMAC 20	March 1, 2014	3	5:00	Liverpool, England	
Draw	7–3–1 (1)	Johan Vänttinen	Draw (split)	Fight Festival 33	October 5, 2013	3	5:00	Helsinki, Finland	
Loss	7–3 (1)	Kai Puolakka	Decision (unanimous)	Cage 22	May 11, 2013	3	5:00	Vantaa, Finland	
Loss	7–2 (1)	Elijah Bokelli	TKO (doctor stoppage)	100% Fight 14	March 16, 2013	2	0:55	Levallois-Perret, France	
NC	7–1 (1)	Nicholas Musoke	NC (judging error)	Vision FC 5	December 1, 2012	3	5:00	Stockholm, Sweden	Originally a majority draw; overturned after judging decision error.
Win	7–1	Leon Kenge	Decision (split)	100% Fight 12	June 30, 2012	2	5:00	Paris, France	
Loss	6–1	Sergei Lomonosov	Decision (unanimous)	Lions FC 2	March 10, 2012	3	5:00	Neuchâtel, Switzerland	
Win	6–0	Aron Bland	Submission (armbar)	Kombat Komplett 5	February 18, 2012	1	1:16	Baumholder, Germany	
Win	5–0	Maxime Maucotel	Submission (armbar)	100% Fight: Contenders 12	December 10, 2011	1	2:01	Villepinte, France	Won the 100% Fight Welterweight Tournament.
Win	4–0	Damien Lapilus	Decision (unanimous)	100% Fight: Contenders 12	December 10, 2011	2	5:00	Villepinte, France	100% Fight Welterweight Tournament Semifinal.
Win	3–0	Yacin Daji	Submission (armbar)	100% Fight: Contenders 12	December 10, 2011	2	3:49	Villepinte, France	100% Fight Welterweight Tournament Quarterfinal.
Win	2–0	Benoit Canfora	Decision (unanimous)	Pancrace Athletic Challenge 2	October 29, 2011	3	5:00	Sarrebourg, France	
Win	1–0	Loic Marty	Submission (rear-naked choke)	100% Fight 5	May 28, 2011	1	3:59	Paris, France	Welterweight debut.

== See also ==
- List of male mixed martial artists
