= Stevie Ray (fighter) =

Scottish mixed martial arts fighter

- Born: Steven Ray; 25 March 1990 (age 36); Kirkcaldy, Fife, Scotland
- Other names: Braveheart
- Height: 5 ft 10 in (1.78 m)
- Weight: 155 lb (70 kg; 11.1 st)
- Division: Lightweight; Welterweight
- Reach: 70 in (178 cm)
- Stance: Southpaw
- Fighting out of: Kirkcaldy, Fife, Scotland
- Team: Higher Level MMA; Dinky Ninjas / Tristar Gym
- Rank: Black belt in Brazilian Jiu-Jitsu
- Years active: 2010–present

Kickboxing record
- Total: 1
- Wins: 1
- Losses: 0
- Draws: 0

Mixed martial arts record
- Total: 39
- Wins: 26
- By knockout: 6
- By submission: 10
- By decision: 10
- Losses: 13
- By knockout: 4
- By submission: 4
- By decision: 5

Amateur record
- Total: 7
- Wins: 7
- By knockout: 1
- By submission: 5

Other information
- Mixed martial arts record from Sherdog

Steven Ray (born 25 March 1990) is a Scottish mixed martial artist who competed in the Ultimate Fighting Championship (UFC), Professional Fighters League (PFL), BAMMA and Cage Warriors, where he was the Lightweight Champion, as well as the BAMMA British Lightweight Champion.

== Mixed martial arts career ==
=== Early career ===
Ray started as an amateur, going 7–0, his first fight was a short notice fight, at Middleweight, for which he weighed in 175 lbs. His next fights were at Welterweight.

Ray made his professional mixed martial arts debut in June 2010. Ray competed predominantly in the United Kingdom where he amassed a record of 16–5 before joining the Ultimate Fighting Championship.

He also won a pro muay thai fight against Scott Morrison, class B rules, super middleweight division, by unanimous decision on 12 May 2012.

=== Ultimate Fighting Championship ===
Ray made his promotional debut as a short notice replacement for an injured Jason Saggo against Marcin Bandel on 11 April 2015 at UFC Fight Night 64. Ray won the one-sided fight via TKO in the second round.

Ray faced Leonardo Mafra on 18 July 2015 at UFC Fight Night 72. He won the fight via TKO in the first round and earned a Performance of the Night bonus.

Ray faced Mickael Lebout on 24 October 2015 at UFC Fight Night 76. He won the bout by unanimous decision.

Ray was expected to face Jake Matthews on 8 July 2016 at The Ultimate Fighter 23 Finale. However, Ray pulled out of the fight in early June due to visa issues and was replaced by Kevin Lee.

Ray next faced Alan Patrick on 24 September 2016 at UFC Fight Night 95. He lost the fight via unanimous decision.

Ray faced Ross Pearson on 19 November 2016 at UFC Fight Night 99. He won the fight via split decision.

Ray next faced Joe Lauzon on 22 April 2017 at UFC Fight Night 108. After taking a beating and coming close to being finished by Lauzon in the first round, Ray came back strong in the second and third rounds when Lauzon started to fade because of the energy he used in the first round. After a close fight, Ray was awarded a majority decision victory.

Ray faced Paul Felder on 16 July 2017 at UFC Fight Night 113. He lost the fight by knockout in the first round after being dropped with a knee strike and subsequently finished off with a series of elbows, marking the first time he's been finished by strikes in his MMA career. The fight with Felder also marked the last fight of his prevailing contract with UFC.

As the first bout of his new four-fight contract, Ray faced Kajan Johnson on 17 March 2018 at UFC Fight Night 127. He lost the fight via split decision.

Ray faced Jessin Ayari on 27 October 2018 at UFC Fight Night 138 He won the fight by controversial unanimous decision.

Ray faced Leonardo Santos on 1 June 2019 at UFC Fight Night: Gustafsson vs. Smith. He lost the fight via knockout in the first round.

Ray faced Michael Johnson at UFC on ESPN+ 20 on 26 October 2019. He won the fight via majority decision.

Ray was expected to face Marc Diakiese on 21 March 2020 at UFC Fight Night: Woodley vs. Edwards. However, Ray was removed from the card in late-January for undisclosed reasons. Diakiese is expected to remain on the card against promotional newcomer Jai Herbert However, due to COVID-19 pandemic, the event was cancelled.

On 21 September 2020 Ray announced his retirement from competing in MMA due to ongoing knee injuries. He would later reveal that his retirement was due to the UFC cutting him from the promotion due to turning down a fight due to visa issues stemming from prior legal problems, something which he claims the UFC was already aware of.

=== Professional Fighters League ===
In 2021, Ray came out of retirement and signed with Professional Fighters League.

==== 2022 Season ====
Ray faced Alexander Martinez on 20 April 2022 at PFL 1. He lost the bout via unanimous decision.

Ray faced Anthony Pettis on 24 June 2022 at PFL 5. He won the bout in the second round via modified body triangle.

Ray rematched Anthony Pettis in the Semifinals of the Lightweight tournament on 5 August 2022 at PFL 7. Once again, Ray won the bout, this time via unanimous decision.

Ray faced Olivier Aubin-Mercier in the finals of the Lightweight tournament on 25 November 2022 at PFL 10. He lost the bout after being knocked out in the second round.

==== 2023 Season ====
In the 2023 season, Ray faced Natan Schulte on 14 April 2023 at PFL 3. He lost the fight via unanimous decision.

Ray faced Clay Collard on 23 June 2023 at PFL 6. He lost the fight via TKO in the second round.

After the loss, Ray announced his retirement for the second time.

==== Return from retirement ====
Ray announced his return from retirement and would come back to fight Lewis Long in the main event of PFL Europe 3 in his home country of Scotland on 28 September 2024. He would win via first round submission with another modified body triangle which Ray has named as being a Scottish Twister.

== Professional grappling career ==
Stevie Ray has also competed in Brazilian jiu-jitsu, in 2011 he won the Scotia Cup 2011, in the middleweight (under 82,3 kg/181 lbs) division at white belt and the Glasgow Open 2011, in the medium-heavyweight (under 88,3 kg/194 lbs) division at white belt.

In 2012 he won Scotia Cup 2012, in the medium-heavyweight (under 88,3 kg/194 lbs) division at blue belt and the Glasgow Open 2012, in the middleweight (under 82,3 kg/181 lbs) division at blue belt.

In 2013 he placed 3rd in the Glasgow No Gi Open 2013, in the middleweight (under 82,3 kg/181 lbs) advanced division.

Ray fought Ellis Younger in a no gi grappling match, at 176 lbs / 80 kg, on 25 August 2018, in an event called Scottish Grappling Invitational 2. He lost the match on points.

On 20 April 2019, Ray competed in the Edinburgh Open 2019, he took 1st place in the Middleweight (82,3 kg/181 lbs) Gi - purple belt division and also took 1st place in the Middleweight (79,5 kg/175 lbs) No Gi - purple belt division.

Ray made his return to the grappling scene on 19 August 2019 at Polaris 11, taking on former Cage Warriors champion Paddy Pimblett in a - 77 kg nogi bout, winning the match by inside heel hook.

Ray competed against Craig Ewers, at Polaris 18, at 170 lbs/77 kg, on 27 November 2021, winning the match by submission via modified Twister.

Ray competed against Shane Curtis at Grapplefest 17, at 198 lbs/90 kg on 18 November 2023. He won the match by submitting Curtis with a heel hook.

Ray faced Ibrahima Mane, at Middleweight, 185 lbs/84 kg, on the main card of ADXC 4 on 18 May 2024. He won the match by submission in the first round.

Ray competed against Jed Hue at Polaris 28 on 15 June 2024. He lost the match by decision.

== Bare-knuckle boxing ==
Ray made his debut with Bare Knuckle Fighting Championship against Danny Christie on 7 November 2026 at BKFC 96 and lost the fight by technical knockout at the end of the second round.

== Championships and accomplishments ==
=== Mixed martial arts ===
- Ultimate Fighting Championship
  - Performance of the Night (One time) vs. Leonardo Mafra
  - UFC.com Awards
    - 2015: Ranked #8 Newcomer of the Year
- BAMMA
  - BAMMA British Lightweight Championship
- Cage Warriors Fighting Championship
  - CWFC Lightweight Championship (Two times)
  - One successful title defence
  - CWFC 2013 Lightweight Tournament Winner
- Total Combat
  - TC European Welterweight Championship
- On Top Promotions
  - OTP 2011 Welterweight Tournament Runner-up
- Scottish Fight Challenge
  - SFC Welterweight Championship
  - SFC Welterweight Tournament Winner
- Sherdog
  - 2022 Submission of the Year vs. Anthony Pettis
- Violent Money TV
  - VMTV x PFL Comeback of the Year 2022
- Jits Magazine
  - MMA Submission of the Year vs. Lewis Long at PFL Europe 3 (2024)

=== Brazilian jiu-jitsu ===
- Scotia Cup
  - Scotia Cup 2011 white belt middleweight (under 82,3 kg/181 lbs) – 1st place
  - Scotia Cup 2012 blue belt medium-heavyweight (under 88,3 kg/194 lbs) – 1st place
- Glasgow Open
  - Glasgow Open 2011 white belt medium-heavyweight (under 88,3 kg/194 lbs) – 1st place
  - Glasgow Open 2012 blue belt middleweight (under 82,3 kg/181 lbs) – 1st place
- Edinburgh Open
  - Edinburgh Open 2019 purple belt middleweight division (under 82,3 kg/181 lbs) - 1st place

=== Submission grappling ===
- Glasgow No Gi Open
  - Glasgow Open 2013 advanced middleweight division (under 82,3 kg/181 lbs) – 3rd place
- Edinburgh Open
  - Edinburgh Open 2019 middleweight division (under 79,5 kg/175 lbs) - 1st place

== Mixed martial arts record ==
Professional record breakdown
39 matches	26 wins	13 losses
By knockout	6	4
By submission	10	4
By decision	10	5

Res.	Record	Opponent	Method	Event	Date	Round	Time	Location	Notes
Win	26–13	Lewis Long	Submission (twister)	PFL Europe 3 (2024)	September 28, 2024	1	4:24	Glasgow, Scotland	Return to Welterweight.
Loss	25–13	Clay Collard	TKO (punches)	PFL 6 (2023)	June 23, 2023	2	1:04	Atlanta, Georgia, United States	
Loss	25–12	Natan Schulte	Decision (unanimous)	PFL 3 (2023)	April 14, 2023	3	5:00	Las Vegas, Nevada, United States	
Loss	25–11	Olivier Aubin-Mercier	KO (punch)	PFL 10 (2022)	November 25, 2022	2	4:40	New York City, New York, United States	2022 PFL Lightweight Tournament Final.
Win	25–10	Anthony Pettis	Decision (unanimous)	PFL 7 (2022)	August 5, 2022	3	5:00	New York City, New York, United States	2022 PFL Lightweight Tournament Semifinal.
Win	24–10	Anthony Pettis	Submission (twister)	PFL 5 (2022)	June 24, 2022	2	3:57	Atlanta, Georgia, United States	
Loss	23–10	Alexander Martinez	Decision (unanimous)	PFL 1 (2022)	April 20, 2022	3	5:00	Arlington, Texas, United States	
Win	23–9	Michael Johnson	Decision (majority)	UFC Fight Night: Maia vs. Askren	October 26, 2019	3	5:00	Kallang, Singapore	
Loss	22–9	Leonardo Santos	KO (punch)	UFC Fight Night: Gustafsson vs. Smith	June 1, 2019	1	2:17	Stockholm, Sweden	
Win	22–8	Jessin Ayari	Decision (unanimous)	UFC Fight Night: Volkan vs. Smith	October 27, 2018	3	5:00	Moncton, New Brunswick, Canada	
Loss	21–8	Kajan Johnson	Decision (split)	UFC Fight Night: Werdum vs. Volkov	March 17, 2018	3	5:00	London, England	
Loss	21–7	Paul Felder	KO (elbows)	UFC Fight Night: Nelson vs. Ponzinibbio	July 16, 2017	1	3:57	Glasgow, Scotland	
Win	21–6	Joe Lauzon	Decision (majority)	UFC Fight Night: Swanson vs. Lobov	April 22, 2017	3	5:00	Nashville, Tennessee, United States	
Win	20–6	Ross Pearson	Decision (split)	UFC Fight Night: Mousasi vs. Hall 2	November 19, 2016	3	5:00	Belfast, Northern Ireland	
Loss	19–6	Alan Patrick	Decision (unanimous)	UFC Fight Night: Cyborg vs. Lansberg	September 24, 2016	3	5:00	Brasília, Brazil	
Win	19–5	Mickael Lebout	Decision (unanimous)	UFC Fight Night: Holohan vs. Smolka	October 24, 2015	3	5:00	Dublin, Ireland	
Win	18–5	Leonardo Mafra	TKO (punches)	UFC Fight Night: Bisping vs. Leites	July 18, 2015	1	2:30	Glasgow, Scotland	Performance of the Night.
Win	17–5	Marcin Bandel	TKO (punches)	UFC Fight Night: Gonzaga vs. Cro Cop 2	April 11, 2015	2	1:35	Kraków, Poland	
Win	16–5	Curt Warburton	Submission (rear-naked choke)	Cage Warriors 73	November 1, 2014	2	2:00	Newcastle, England	Defended the Cage Warriors Lightweight Championship.
Win	15–5	Curt Warburton	Decision (split)	Cage Warriors 69	June 7, 2014	5	5:00	London, England	Won the vacant Cage Warriors Lightweight Championship.
Loss	14–5	Ivan Buchinger	Submission (rear-naked choke)	Cage Warriors 63	December 31, 2013	4	3:43	Dublin, Ireland	Lost the Cage Warriors Lightweight Championship.
Win	14–4	Sean Carter	Submission (rear-naked choke)	Cage Warriors 60	October 5, 2013	1	4:40	London, England	Won the Cage Warriors Lightweight Tournament and the vacant Cage Warriors Lightweight Championship.
Win	13–4	Jason Ball	Decision (unanimous)	Cage Warriors 60	October 5, 2013	2	5:00	London, England	Cage Warriors Lightweight Tournament Semifinal.
Loss	12–4	Curt Warburton	Decision (unanimous)	BAMMA 12	March 9, 2013	3	5:00	Newcastle, England	Lost the BAMMA British Lightweight Championship.
Win	12–3	Dale Hardiman	Decision (unanimous)	BAMMA 11	December 2, 2012	3	5:00	Birmingham, England	Won the inaugural BAMMA British Lightweight Championship.
Win	11–3	Stu Barrs	TKO (punches)	Caledonian Combat 1: The Gathering	July 21, 2012	2	3:37	Inverness, Scotland	Lightweight debut.
Win	10–3	Qasim Shafiq	Submission (armbar)	On Top 5	June 2, 2012	1	1:02	Glasgow, Scotland	Catchweight (165 lb) bout.
Loss	9–3	Assan Njie	Submission (guillotine choke)	Cage Warriors Fight Night 4	March 15, 2012	2	2:29	Dubai, United Arab Emirates	
Win	9–2	Vaidas Valancius	Submission (rear-naked choke)	On Top 4	February 25, 2012	1	2:41	Glasgow, Scotland	
Win	8–2	John Quinn	KO (punches)	On Top 3	September 24, 2011	1	0:57	Glasgow, Scotland	
Loss	7–2	Nico Musoke	Submission (rear-naked choke)	On Top 2	June 18, 2011	1	4:56	Glasgow, Scotland	On Top Welterweight Tournament Final. For the on Top Welterweight Championship.
Win	7–1	Merv Mulholland	Submission (triangle armbar)	On Top 2	June 18, 2011	2	4:59	Glasgow, Scotland	On Top Welterweight Tournament Semifinal.
Win	6–1	Scott Ward	TKO (punches)	Scottish Fight Challenge 4	April 17, 2011	3	2:37	Stirling, Scotland	Won the inaugural SFC Welterweight Championship.
Win	5–1	Davey Parker	Submission (arm-triangle choke)	Total Combat 39	March 12, 2011	1	2:14	Durham, England	Won the TC European Welterweight Championship.
Loss	4–1	Dan Hope	Technical Submission (armbar)	Honour 4	November 27, 2010	1	0:00	Aberdeen, Scotland	
Win	4–0	Mark Young	Submission (heel hook)	Scottish Fight Challenge 3: Showdown	October 10, 2010	1	0:00	Stirling, Scotland	Won the SFC Welterweight Tournament.
Win	3–0	Vincent del Guerra	Decision (unanimous)	Scottish Fight Challenge 3: Showdown	October 10, 2010	2	5:00	Stirling, Scotland	SFC Welterweight Tournament Semifinal.
Win	2–0	Loic Marty	Submission (brabo choke)	Brawl at the Bay	July 25, 2010	1	0:00	Fife, Scotland	
Win	1–0	Shaun Edmondson	KO (punch)	Scottish Fight Challenge 2	June 27, 2010	1	1:54	Stirling, Scotland	Welterweight debut.

== Bare knuckle record ==
Professional record breakdown
1 match	0 wins	1 loss
By knockout	0	1

Res.	Record	Opponent	Method	Event	Date	Round	Time	Location	Notes
Loss	0–1	Dannie Christie	TKO	BKFC 96	7 November 2026	2	1:59	Glasgow, Scotland	

== See also ==
- List of male mixed martial artists
