= Marcin Bandel =

Polish mixed martial artist (born 1989)

- Born: Marcin Bandel; October 10, 1989 (age 37); Pabianice, Poland
- Other names: Bomba
- Height: 5 ft 10 in (1.78 m)
- Weight: 170 lb (77 kg; 12 st 2 lb)
- Division: Lightweight (2014–2015, 2017); Welterweight (2013–2014, 2015–2021, 2023–present); Super Welterweight (2021–2022); Middleweight (2009–2013, 2018, 2019)
- Reach: 70.0 in (178 cm)
- Style: Brazilian jiu-jitsu
- Fighting out of: Pabianice, Poland
- Team: Zenith Vera Fight Club; Ankos MMA Poznań
- Years active: 2009–present

Mixed martial arts record
- Total: 34
- Wins: 22
- By knockout: 1
- By submission: 19
- By decision: 2
- Losses: 11
- By knockout: 7
- By submission: 0
- By decision: 4
- Draws: 1

Other information
- Mixed martial arts record from Sherdog

Marcin Bandel (born October 10, 1989) is a Polish professional mixed martial artist. He currently competes in the Welterweight division. He is a former Brave CF Super Welterweight Champion, and GMC Middleweight Champion. He has previously competed on Ultimate Fighting Championship (UFC), UAE Warriors, Fight Exclusive Night (FEN), and Absolute Championship Akhmat (ACA).

== Professional career ==
=== Early career ===
Bandel made his professional debut on November 21, 2009, against Robert Skrzypczak. Bandel won the fight via a first-round TKO.

=== Paweł Kamiński Memorial Tournament ===
After accumulating a record of 2–2, Bandel competed in the first Paweł Kamiński Memorial Tournament which took place on March 10, 2012. In the first round, he faced Sebastian Hercun. Bandel won the fight via a first-round submission. In the final, which took place later in the evening, he faced Bartosz Janik. Bandel won the fight via a first-round submission, winning the Welterweight tournament.

=== GMC Middleweight Champion ===
After accumulating a professional record of 8–2, Bandel faced Andreas Birgels for the vacant German MMA Championship (GMC) Middleweight Championship on February 16, 2013. Bandel won the fight via a first-round submission, winning his first career championship in the process.

=== Ultimate Fighting Championship ===
After accumulating a professional record of 13–2, Bandel signed with the Ultimate Fighting Championship (UFC) in May 2014. He made his debut on October 4, 2014, at UFC Fight Night 53 against Mairbek Taisumov. Bandel lost the fight via a first-round TKO.

In his next fight, he was scheduled to face Jason Saggo on April 11, 2015, at UFC Fight Night 64. Saggo withdrew a week before the fight due to a torn anterior cruciate ligament, and was replaced by a last-minute debutant, Stevie Ray. Bandel lost the fight via a second-round TKO.

On May 2, 2015, it was confirmed that Bandel was no longer part of the roster.

=== Fight Exclusive Night ===
Following his brief stint with the UFC, Bandel was scheduled to make his professional return under Fight Exclusive Night on November 7, 2015, against Alex Vogt. Vogt later withdrew before the bout, and was replaced by Miroslav Vacek. Bandel won the fight via a first-round submission. This performance earned him his first Submission of the Night bonus.

=== UAE Warriors ===
After accumulating a record of 16–4, it was announced that Bandel will be facing undefeated fighter Allan Zuñiga on November 1, 2016, in UAE Warriors' "Road to Abu Dhabi Warriors". Bandel lost the fight via a Unanimous Decision.

=== Absolute Championship Akhmat ===
After accumulating a record of 18–6–1, Bandel made his debut under Absolute Championship Akhmat (ACA) on June 8, 2019, against Arsen Sultanov. Bandel lost the fight via a first-round TKO.

=== Brave Combat Federation ===
Following one win on the regional circuit, it was announced Bandel will be making his debut under Brave Combat Federation on September 25, 2021, against Magomed Ayskhanov. Bandel won the fight via a first-round submission.

His next fight came on April 30, 2022, against Luis Felipe. Bandel won the fight via a Unanimous Decision.

==== Brave CF Super Welterweight Champion ====
Bandel faced Ismail Naurdiev for the vacant Brave CF Super Welterweight Championship on October 19, 2022. Bandel won the fight via a first-round submission, winning his second career championship.

In his first title defense, he faced Kamal Magomedov on December 5, 2023. Bandel lost the fight via a first-round TKO, losing his championship in the process.

==== Final fight with Brave CF ====
His last fight with the federation came on May 25, 2024, against Alex Lohoré. Bandel lost the fight via a first-round TKO.

=== King's Arena ===
After over a year out, it was announced that Bandel will be returning on September 13, 2025, against Nika Kupravishvili in the main event of the inaugural King's Arena event. Bandel lost the fight via a first-round knockout.

== Championships and accomplishments ==
=== Mixed martial arts ===
- Brave Combat Federation
  - Brave CF Super Welterweight Champion (One time; former)
- German MMA Championship
  - GMC Middleweight Champion (One time; former)
- Fight Exclusive Night
  - Submission of the Night (One time)
- La Familia FightClub
  - Submission of the Night (One time)

== Mixed martial arts record ==
Professional record breakdown
34 matches	22 wins	11 losses
By knockout	1	7
By submission	19	0
By decision	2	4
Draws	1	

Res.	Record	Opponent	Method	Event	Date	Round	Time	Location	Notes
Loss	22–11–1	Ahmet Rasim Pala	Decision (split)	EMC Talents 7	May 23, 2026	3	5:00	Düsseldorf, Germany	Catchweight (175 lb) bout.
Loss	22–10–1	Nika Kupravishvili	KO (punches)	King's Arena 1	September 13, 2025	1	3:39	Poznań, Poland	Return to Welterweight.
Loss	22–9–1	Alex Lohoré	TKO (punches)	Brave CF 83	May 25, 2024	1	1:10	Alkmaar, Netherlands	
Loss	22–8–1	Kamal Magomedov	TKO (knee and punches)	Brave CF 77	December 5, 2023	1	4:01	Isa Town, Bahrain	Lost the Brave CF Super Welterweight Championship.
Win	22–7–1	Ismail Naurdiev	Submission (armbar)	Brave CF 63	October 19, 2022	1	1:20	Isa Town, Bahrain	Won the vacant Brave CF Super Welterweight Championship.
Win	21–7–1	Luis Felipe	Decision (unanimous)	Brave CF 58	April 30, 2022	3	5:00	Incheon, South Korea	
Win	20–7–1	Magomed Ayskhanov	Submission (rear-naked choke)	Brave CF 54	September 25, 2021	1	1:38	Konin, Poland	Super Welterweight debut.
Win	19–7–1	David Karp	Submission (heel hook)	Elite MMA Championship 7	July 3, 2021	1	1:33	Ratingen, Germany	Return to Welterweight.
Loss	18–7–1	Arseniy Sultanov	TKO (punches)	ACA 96	June 8, 2019	1	2:34	Łódź, Poland	Return to Middleweight.
Loss	18–6–1	David Bielkheden	Decision (unanimous)	Superior Challenge 18	December 1, 2018	3	5:00	Stockholm, Sweden	For the SC Welterweight Championship.
Win	18–5–1	Selim Agaev	Decision (unanimous)	German MMA Championship 14	February 24, 2018	3	5:00	Castrop-Rauxel, Germany	Return to Welterweight.
Draw	17–5–1	Mickaël Lebout	Draw (majority)	Fight Club Slam 2017	October 7, 2017	3	5:00	Leganes, Spain	Return to Lightweight.
Win	17–5	Amir Sheikh Hosseini	Submission (heel hook)	La Familia Fight Night 8	May 20, 2017	1	0:49	Halle, Germany	
Loss	16–5	Allan Zuñiga	Decision (unanimous)	Road To Abu Dhabi Warriors	November 1, 2016	3	5:00	São Paulo, Brazil	
Win	16–4	Arber Murati	Submission (kneebar)	La Familia Fight Night 7	May 7, 2016	1	0:32	Halle, Germany	Submission of the Night.
Win	15–4	Tomáš Kužela	Submission (armbar)	Fusion Fight Night 4	March 4, 2016	1	1:00	Brno, Czech Republic	Catchweight (176 lb) bout.
Win	14–4	Miroslav Vacek	Submission (guillotine choke)	Fight Exclusive Night 9	November 7, 2015	1	1:36	Wrocław, Poland	Return to Welterweight. Submission of the Night.
Loss	13–4	Stevie Ray	TKO (punches)	UFC Fight Night: Gonzaga vs. Cro Cop 2	April 11, 2015	2	1:35	Kraków, Poland	
Loss	13–3	Mairbek Taisumov	TKO (punches)	UFC Fight Night: Nelson vs. Story	October 4, 2014	1	1:01	Stockholm, Sweden	Lightweight debut.
Win	13–2	Musa Jangubaev	Submission (heel hook)	La Familia Fight Night 5	May 3, 2014	1	0:58	Halle, Germany	
Win	12–2	Jonny Kruschinske	Submission (armbar)	La Familia Goes Thuringia	November 16, 2013	1	2:58	Saalfeld, Germany	Welterweight debut.
Win	11–2	Veselin Dimitrov	Submission (omoplata)	Fight for Charity	September 28, 2013	1	1:17	Magdeburg, Germany	
Win	10–2	Szymon Dusza	Submission (heel hook)	II Memoriał Pawła Kamińskiego	March 9, 2013	1	2:03	Gniezno, Poland	
Win	9–2	Andreas Birgels	Submission (heel hook)	German MMA Championship 3	February 16, 2013	1	1:32	Herne, Germany	Won the vacant GMC Middleweight Championsip.
Win	8–2	Piotr Wysocki	Submission (armbar)	Fighters Arena 5	January 26, 2013	1	1:34	Kraśnik, Poland	
Win	7–2	Bartosz Fabiński	Submission (heel hook)	Fighters Arena 4	November 24, 2012	1	1:10	Włocławek, Poland	
Win	6–2	Krzysztof Morzyszek	Submission (heel hook)	Fighters Arena 3	September 29, 2012	1	1:23	Łódź, Poland	
Win	5–2	Marcin Gułaś	Submission (heel hook)	MMA Fight Night 1	May 19, 2012	1	1:45	Kołobrzeg, Poland	Catchweight (194 lb) bout.
Win	4–2	Bartosz Janik	Submission (armbar)	I Memoriał Pawła Kamińskiego	March 10, 2012	1	1:32	Gniezno, Poland	Won the I Memoriał Pawła Kamińskiego Welterweight Tournament.
Win	3–2	Sebastian Hercun	Submission (rear-naked choke)	I Memoriał Pawła Kamińskiego	March 10, 2012	1	2:29	Gniezno, Poland	I Memoriał Pawła Kamińskiego Welterweight Tournament Semifinal.
Win	2–2	Andrius Liudvinavicius	Submission (armbar)	Fighters Arena 2	March 25, 2011	1	1:19	Łódź, Poland	
Loss	1–2	Laslo Blaho	KO (punch)	Fighters Arena 1	September 3, 2010	1	0:14	Łódź, Poland	
Loss	1–1	Marcin Krysztofiak	Decision (unanimous)	Strefa Walk: Krysztofiak vs Bandel	May 29, 2010	3	5:00	Poznań, Poland	
Win	1–0	Robert Skrzypczak	TKO (punches)	FCK: Sławno	November 21, 2009	1	N/A	Sławno, Poland	Middleweight debut.

== Submission grappling record ==
Professional Submission grappling record 2 Matches, 2 Wins (1 Submissions), 0 Losses (0 Submission), 0 Draws
Result	Rec.	Opponent	Method	Event	Date	Location
Win	2-0	(Armenia) Narek Gabrielyan	Decision (unanimous)	Mix Fight 58	October 24, 2025	Yerevan, Armenia
Win	1-0	(Bosnia and Herzegovina) Rijad Grabčanović	Submission	Pannonia Super Fights	February 29, 2020	Tuzla, Bosnia and Herzegovina

== See also ==
- List of male mixed martial artists
