= UFC Fight Night: Bisping vs. Leites =

UFC mixed martial arts event in 2015

- The poster for UFC Fight Night: Bisping vs. Leites
- Promotion: Ultimate Fighting Championship
- Date: July 18, 2015
- Venue: OVO Hydro
- City: Glasgow, Scotland
- Attendance: 10,451
- Total gate: $1,500,000

Event chronology
UFC Fight Night: Mir vs. Duffee	UFC Fight Night: Bisping vs. Leites	UFC on Fox: Dillashaw vs. Barão 2

UFC Fight Night: Bisping vs. Leites (also known as UFC Fight Night 72) was a mixed martial arts event held on July 18, 2015 at the OVO Hydro in Glasgow, Scotland.

== Background ==
After previously hosting 15 events at various locations around the United Kingdom, the event was the first that the promotion has hosted in Scotland. Ticket demand was high for the event, with all tickets selling out within a few hours of going on sale.

The event was headlined by a middleweight bout between veteran contender Michael Bisping and former title challenger Thales Leites.

Ian Entwistle was expected to face Marcus Brimage at the event. However, Entwistle pulled out of the fight in late June for undisclosed reasons. He was replaced by promotional newcomer Jimmie Rivera.

Konstantin Erokhin was expected to face Daniel Omielańczuk at the event. However, Erokhin pulled out of the fight in late June citing an injury and was replaced by promotional newcomer Chris de la Rocha.

Jake Matthews was expected to face Mickaël Lebout at the event. However, Matthews pulled out of the fight on 9 July due to an injury and was replaced by promotional newcomer Teemu Packalén.

Bec Rawlings was expected to face Joanne Calderwood at the event. However, Rawlings pulled out of the fight on 10 July due to an injury and was replaced by promotional newcomer Cortney Casey.

== Results ==
Main Card (Fox Sports 1)
Weight class				Method	Round	Time	Notes
Middleweight	Michael Bisping	def.	Thales Leites	Decision (split) (47–48, 49–46, 48–47)	5	5:00
Lightweight	Evan Dunham	def.	Ross Pearson	Decision (unanimous) (30–27, 30–27, 29–28)	3	5:00
Lightweight	Joseph Duffy	def.	Ivan Jorge	Submission (triangle choke)	1	3:05
Women's Strawweight	Joanne Calderwood	def.	Cortney Casey	Decision (unanimous) (30–27, 29–28, 30–27)	3	5:00
Welterweight	Leon Edwards	def.	Pawel Pawlak	Decision (unanimous) (30–27, 30–27, 30–27)	3	5:00
Lightweight	Stevie Ray	def.	Leonardo Mafra	TKO (punches)	1	2:30
Preliminary Card (Fox Sports 1)
Flyweight	Paddy Holohan	def.	Vaughan Lee	Decision (unanimous) (30–27, 30–27, 30–27)	3	5:00
Light Heavyweight	Ilir Latifi	def.	Hans Stringer	KO (punches)	1	0:56
Lightweight	Mickaël Lebout	def.	Teemu Packalén	Decision (unanimous) (29–28, 29–28, 30–27)	3	5:00
Featherweight	Robert Whiteford	def.	Paul Redmond	TKO (punches)	1	3:04
Preliminary Card (UFC Fight Pass)
Bantamweight	Jimmie Rivera	def.	Marcus Brimage	TKO (punches)	1	1:29
Heavyweight	Daniel Omielańczuk	def.	Chris de la Rocha	TKO (punches)	1	0:48

== Bonus awards ==
The following fighters were awarded $50,000 bonuses:

- Fight of the Night: Joanne Calderwood vs. Cortney Casey
- Performance of the Night: Joseph Duffy and Stevie Ray

== See also ==
- List of UFC events
- 2015 in UFC
