= Teemu Packalén =

Finnish mixed martial artist

- Born: May 22, 1987 (age 39); Turku, Finland
- Other names: Pacu
- Height: 6 ft 1 in (185 cm)
- Weight: 155 lb (70 kg; 11 st 1 lb)
- Division: Lightweight
- Reach: 72 in (183 cm)
- Style: Wrestling, Boxing, BJJ
- Fighting out of: Turku, Finland
- Team: Primus Fight Team; Finnfighters' Gym
- Rank: Black belt in Brazilian jiu-jitsu under Harri Niva
- Years active: 2011–2019

Mixed martial arts record
- Total: 11
- Wins: 8
- By knockout: 2
- By submission: 6
- Losses: 3
- By knockout: 2
- By decision: 1

Other information
- Mixed martial arts record from Sherdog

Teemu Packalén (born May 22, 1987) is a retired Finnish mixed martial artist. He was the Amateur Champion of Finland and the Finnish Open Championship winner in 2010. Packalén competed in the Lightweight division of the Ultimate Fighting Championship (UFC).

== Background ==
Born and raised in Southwest Finland, Packalén played ice hockey in the C-Junior SM Series and participated in the national team until the age of 17. Packalén started training Brazilian jiu-jitsu in 2007. Packalén trained wrestling when he was young and he won the title for Finland Open Championship in 2010 and third place in European Championships in 2011. Packalén also won the Amateur MMA Championship title in 2012.

== Mixed martial arts career ==
=== Early career ===
Packalén began his professional career competing on the regional circuit in Finland for three years and amassed a record of 7-0 prior joining UFC.

=== Ultimate Fighting Championship ===
Packalén was signed by UFC in July 2015 and he was the fourth Finnish fighter to be part of the UFC roster after Tony Halme, Makwan Amirkhani and Tina Lähdemäki.

For his promotional debut, he was tabbed as a short notice replacement for an injured Jake Matthews on July 18, 2015, at UFC Fight Night: Bisping vs. Leites against Mickaël Lebout. He lost the fight via unanimous decision with the score board of (30–27, 30–27, 29–28).

Packalén was expected to face Łukasz Sajewski on February 27, 2016, at UFC Fight Night: Silva vs. Bisping. However, on 16 February, Sajewski pulled out due to an injury and was replaced by promotional newcomer Thibault Gouti. He submitted Gouti in 24 seconds into round one via a rear-naked choke. This win earned Packalén Performance of the Night bonus award.

Packalén was sidelined with a shoulder injury which entailed a long duration of recovery.

On March 18, 2017, he faced Marc Diakiese at UFC Fight Night: Manuwa vs. Anderson. He lost the fight via knockout in the first round.

Packalén was expected to face Marcin Held on October 21, 2017, at UFC Fight Night 118. However, Packalen pulled out of the fight on October 5 citing a knee injury.

Packalen was expected to return from his hiatus to face Alexander Yakovlev on April 20, 2019, at UFC Fight Night 149. However, on April 4, 2019, it was reported that Packalen pull out for undisclosed reason and he was replaced by Alex da Silva Coelho.

Packalén faced promotional newcomer Ottman Azaitar on September 7, 2019, at UFC 242. He lost the fight via knockout in the first round.

In March 2020, Packalén's contract with the UFC expired. Despite interest from the organization, Packalén was noncommittal on continuing his mixed martial arts career. Later, on November 1, 2021, Packalén announced that he had retired from mixed martial arts.

== Personal life ==
Packalén and his fiancée Eevi Teittinen, a fitness model from Finland, have a daughter (born 2021).

== Championships and accomplishments ==
=== Mixed martial arts ===
- Ultimate Fighting Championship
  - Performance of the Night (One time) vs. Thibault Gouti
  - UFC.com Awards
    - 2016: Ranked #5 Submission of the Year vs. Thibault Gouti

== Mixed martial arts record ==
Professional record breakdown
11 matches	8 wins	3 losses
By knockout	2	2
By submission	6	0
By decision	0	1

Res.	Record	Opponent	Method	Event	Date	Round	Time	Location	Notes
Loss	8–3	Ottman Azaitar	KO (punch)	UFC 242	September 7, 2019	1	3:35	Abu Dhabi, United Arab Emirates	
Loss	8–2	Marc Diakiese	KO (punch)	UFC Fight Night: Manuwa vs. Anderson	March 18, 2017	1	0:30	London, England	
Win	8–1	Thibault Gouti	Submission (rear-naked choke)	UFC Fight Night: Silva vs. Bisping	February 27, 2016	1	0:24	London, England	Performance of the Night.
Loss	7–1	Mickaël Lebout	Decision (unanimous)	UFC Fight Night: Bisping vs. Leites	July 18, 2015	3	5:00	Glasgow, Scotland	
Win	7–0	Suleiman Bouhata	Submission (guillotine choke)	Fight Night Finland: Turku Fight Night	April 25, 2015	1	0:23	Turku, Finland	
Win	6–0	Hyram Rodriguez	Submission (kimura)	Cage 27	November 8, 2014	2	1:47	Turku, Finland	
Win	5–0	Sebastian Fournier	TKO (elbows)	Cage 26	April 5, 2014	1	1:53	Turku, Finland	
Win	4–0	Damien Lapilus	Submission (heel hook)	Cage 24	November 9, 2013	1	2:44	Turku, Finland	
Win	3–0	Grzegorz Sajbor	Submission (armbar)	StandUpWar 4	August 24, 2013	1	1:58	Tampere, Finland	
Win	2–0	Konstantinos Persson	Submission (rear-naked choke)	Fight for Glory: First Round	April 6, 2013	2	2:37	Turku, Finland	
Win	1–0	Grzegorz Szulakowski	TKO (doctor stoppage)	StandUpWar 3	October 27, 2012	1	5:00	Tampere, Finland	Lightweight debut.

== See also ==
- List of male mixed martial artists
