= UFC Fight Night: Gonzaga vs. Cro Cop 2 =

UFC mixed martial arts event in 2015

- The poster for UFC Fight Night: Gonzaga vs. Cro Cop 2
- Promotion: Ultimate Fighting Championship
- Date: April 11, 2015
- Venue: Tauron Arena Kraków
- City: Kraków, Poland
- Attendance: 10,000
- Total gate: $720,000

Event chronology
UFC Fight Night: Mendes vs. Lamas	UFC Fight Night: Gonzaga vs. Cro Cop 2	UFC on Fox: Machida vs. Rockhold

UFC Fight Night: Gonzaga vs. Cro Cop 2 (also known as UFC Fight Night 64) was a mixed martial arts event held on April 11, 2015, at the Tauron Arena Kraków in Kraków, Poland.

== Background ==
The event was the first that the organization has hosted in Poland.

The main event featured a heavyweight rematch between Gabriel Gonzaga and returning veteran Mirko Cro Cop, who last fought in the organization at UFC 137 in 2011. Gonzaga won their first encounter at UFC 70 in 2007 via knockout due to a first round head kick which has become one of the most famous and replayed finishes in UFC history.

Peter Sobotta was expected to face Sérgio Moraes at the event. However, Sobotta was forced out of the bout citing injury and was replaced by Gasan Umalatov. On March 28, it was announced that Umalatov had also pulled out of the fight and was replaced by French newcomer Mickaël Lebout.

Krzysztof Jotko was expected to face promotional newcomer Garreth McLellan at the event. However, Jotko pulled out of the bout and was replaced by fellow newcomer Bartosz Fabiński.

Cláudia Gadelha was expected to face Aisling Daly at the event. However, Gadelha pulled out of the bout in late March citing a recent muscle spasm in her back. Subsequently, Daly was pulled from the card entirely.

Jason Saggo was expected to face Marcin Bandel at the event. However, Saggo pulled out of the bout due to an Achilles tendon rupture and was replaced by promotional newcomer Stevie Ray.

== Results ==
Main Card (UFC Fight Pass)
Weight class				Method	Round	Time	Notes
Heavyweight	Mirko Cro Cop	def.	Gabriel Gonzaga	TKO (elbows and punches)	3	3:30
Light Heavyweight	Jimi Manuwa	def.	Jan Błachowicz	Decision (unanimous) (30–27, 30–27, 29–28)	3	5:00
Welterweight	Paweł Pawlak	def.	Sheldon Westcott	Decision (unanimous) (29–28, 29–28, 29–28)	3	5:00
Women's Strawweight	Maryna Moroz	def.	Joanne Calderwood	Submission (armbar)	1	1:30
Preliminary Card (UFC Fight Pass)
Welterweight	Leon Edwards	def.	Seth Baczynski	KO (punches)	1	0:08
Middleweight	Bartosz Fabiński	def.	Garreth McLellan	Decision (unanimous) (30–27, 30–27, 30–27)	3	5:00
Welterweight	Sérgio Moraes	def.	Mickaël Lebout	Decision (unanimous) (29–28, 29–28, 29–28)	3	5:00
Featherweight	Yaotzin Meza	def.	Damian Stasiak	Decision (unanimous) (30–27, 29–28, 29–28)	3	5:00
Heavyweight	Anthony Hamilton	def.	Daniel Omielańczuk	Decision (unanimous) (29–28, 29–28, 29–27)	3	5:00
Women's Strawweight	Aleksandra Albu	def.	Izabela Badurek	Submission (guillotine choke)	2	3:34
Lightweight	Stevie Ray	def.	Marcin Bandel	TKO (punches)	2	1:35
Featherweight	Taylor Lapilus	def.	Rocky Lee	Decision (unanimous) (30–27, 30–27, 30–27)	3	5:00

== Bonus awards ==
The following fighters were awarded $50,000 bonuses:

- Fight of the Night: Mirko Cro Cop vs. Gabriel Gonzaga
- Performance of the Night: Maryna Moroz and Leon Edwards

== See also ==
- List of UFC events
- 2015 in UFC
