= UFC 127 =

UFC mixed martial arts event in 2011

UFC 127: Penn vs. Fitch
- The poster for UFC 127: Penn vs. Fitch
- Promotion: Ultimate Fighting Championship
- Date: February 27, 2011
- Venue: Acer Arena
- City: Sydney, Australia
- Attendance: 18,186
- Total gate: $3,500,000
- Buyrate: 260,000

Event chronology
UFC 126: Silva vs. Belfort	UFC 127: Penn vs. Fitch	UFC Live: Sanchez vs. Kampmann

UFC 127: Penn vs. Fitch was a mixed martial arts event held by the Ultimate Fighting Championship on Sunday, February 27, 2011, at Acer Arena in Sydney, Australia. Due to the time zone difference it aired live on Saturday, February 26 in North America. This was the second UFC event held in Sydney, following the sold-out UFC 110 in 2010.

== Background ==
Tickets for UFC Fight Club members went on sale on 14 December 2010. UFC 127 sold out moments after going on public sale on 16 December 2010, selling faster than tickets for UFC 110, and making it the fastest-selling event, along with UFC 115, in UFC history.

ESPN UK aired the Ross Pearson vs. Spencer Fisher fight, which was confirmed by Jon Anik on MMA Live. Ion Television aired the Pearson vs. Fisher, Te-Huna vs. Gustafsson and Ring vs. Fukuda preliminary bouts, while the Perosh vs. Blackledge and Zhang vs. Rheinhardt preliminary bouts were streamed on the UFC's official Facebook page.

On 9 February, it was announced that a knee injury had forced Carlos Condit out of his bout with Chris Lytle. Condit was replaced by promotional newcomer Brian Ebersole.

== Results ==
Main card
Weight class				Method	Round	Time	Notes
Welterweight	B.J. Penn	vs.	Jon Fitch	Draw (majority) (28–29, 28–28, 28–28)	3	5:00
Middleweight	Michael Bisping	def.	Jorge Rivera	TKO (punches)	2	1:54	(Note: Bisping was deducted one point in round 1 after landing an illegal knee.)
Lightweight	Dennis Siver	def.	George Sotiropoulos	Decision (unanimous) (29–28, 30–28, 30–27)	3	5:00
Welterweight	Brian Ebersole	def.	Chris Lytle	Decision (unanimous) (30–27, 29–28, 29–28)	3	5:00
Middleweight	Kyle Noke	def.	Chris Camozzi	Submission (rear-naked choke)	1	1:35
Preliminary card (Spike)
Lightweight	Ross Pearson	def.	Spencer Fisher	Decision (unanimous) (30–27, 29–28, 29–28)	3	5:00
Light Heavyweight	Alexander Gustafsson	def.	James Te Huna	Submission (rear-naked choke)	1	4:27	(Note: This fight aired on the PPV broadcast in the event review.)
Middleweight	Nick Ring	def.	Riki Fukuda	Decision (unanimous) (29–28, 29–28, 29–28)	3	5:00
Preliminary card (Facebook)
Light Heavyweight	Anthony Perosh	def.	Tom Blackledge	Submission (rear-naked choke)	1	2:45
Featherweight	Zhang Tiequan	def.	Jason Reinhardt	Submission (guillotine choke)	1	0:48	(Note: This fight aired on the PPV broadcast following the Ebersole vs. Lytle fight.)
Preliminary card
Heavyweight	Mark Hunt	def.	Chris Tuchscherer	KO (punch)	2	1:41	(Note: This fight aired on the PPV broadcast following the Penn vs. Fitch fight.)
Lightweight	Curt Warburton	def.	Maciej Jewtuszko	Decision (unanimous) (29–28, 29–28, 29–28)	3	5:00

== Bonus awards ==
The following fighters received $75,000 bonuses.

- Fight of the Night: Brian Ebersole vs. Chris Lytle
- Knockout of the Night: Mark Hunt
- Submission of the Night: Kyle Noke
