= Ross Pearson =

English mixed martial arts fighter

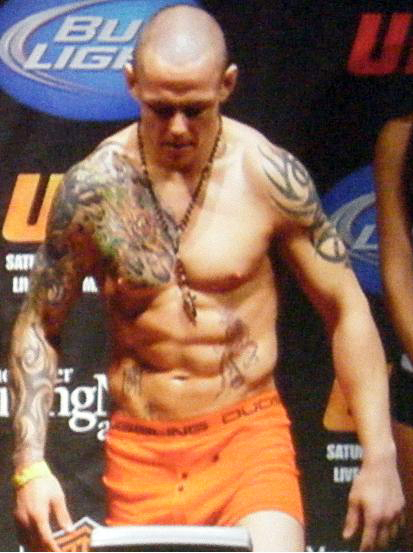
- Ross Pearson at UFC 105 weigh-ins
- Born: 26 September 1984 (age 42); Sunderland, Tyne and Wear, England, United Kingdom
- Other names: The Real Deal
- Height: 5 ft 8 in (1.73 m)
- Weight: 170 lb (77 kg; 12 st)
- Division: Welterweight; Lightweight; Featherweight
- Reach: 69 in (175 cm)
- Style: Boxing
- Fighting out of: Sunderland, Tyne and Wear, England, United Kingdom
- Team: The Alliance
- Rank: Black belt in Taekwondo; Brown belt in Judo; Blue belt in Brazilian Jiu-Jitsu
- Years active: 2004–2019 (MMA); 2019–2021 (Boxing)

Professional boxing record
- Total: 2
- Wins: 1
- By knockout: 1
- Losses: 1
- By knockout: 1

Mixed martial arts record
- Total: 38
- Wins: 20
- By knockout: 7
- By submission: 5
- By decision: 8
- Losses: 17
- By knockout: 6
- By submission: 2
- By decision: 9
- No contests: 1

Other information
- Spouse: Kristie Jane Pearson
- Website: http://www.rosspearson.net/
- Boxing record from BoxRec
- Mixed martial arts record from Sherdog

Ross Pearson (born 26 September 1984) is a retired English mixed martial artist and professional boxer. A 26-fight veteran of the UFC, he was a three-time "Fight of the Night" winner and was the lightweight winner of The Ultimate Fighter 9.

== Background ==
Pearson, born and raised in Sunderland, England, began training in Tae Kwon Do at the age of six, before adding Judo and Boxing to his repertoire in high-school. Pearson later began training in Brazilian Jiu-Jitsu at the age of 17. He also attended Carilion Craft Training in Sunderland. Pearson worked as a brick layer afterwards. Inspired by early UFC events, Pearson decided to become a professional MMA fighter.

== Mixed martial arts career ==
=== The Ultimate Fighter reality show ===
In 2009, Pearson competed on the reality TV show The Ultimate Fighter: United States vs. United Kingdom. He placed first in the lightweight division.

=== Ultimate Fighting Championship ===
==== 2010 ====
Pearson defeated kickboxer Dennis Siver by unanimous decision on 31 March at UFC Fight Night 21.

Pearson was submitted by Cole Miller via second-round rear-naked choke on 15 September 2010 at UFC Fight Night 22.

Pearson faced Spencer Fisher on 27 February 2011 at UFC 127. He won the fight via unanimous decision.

==== 2011 ====
Pearson lost to Edson Barboza via split decision at UFC 134 in a bout that earned Fight of the Night honours.

For his next fight, Pearson dropped to Featherweight and faced Junior Assunção on 30 December at UFC 141. Pearson won the fight by unanimous decision.

Pearson faced Cub Swanson on 22 June 2012 at UFC on FX 4. He lost the fight by TKO late into the second round.

==== 2012 ====
In July Pearson was confirmed as the Team UK coach for The Ultimate Fighter: The Smashes. Pearson faced George Sotiropoulos in a Lightweight bout on 15 December 2012 at UFC on FX 6. He won the fight by an early third-round TKO.

==== 2013 ====
Pearson next faced Ryan Couture on 6 April 2013 at UFC on Fuel TV 9. He won the fight by TKO in the third round.

Pearson faced Melvin Guillard on 26 October 2013 at UFC Fight Night 30. The fight ended in a no contest when Pearson was deemed unable to continue after being cut on the forehead by an accidental illegal knee.

==== 2014 ====
A rematch with Guillard was expected to take place on 8 March 2014 at UFC Fight Night 37. However, Pearson pulled out of the bout citing a knee injury and was replaced by Michael Johnson.

Pearson faced Diego Sanchez on 7 June 2014 at UFC Fight Night 42. Despite outstriking Sanchez in every round, and getting a knockdown in round 2, Pearson would ultimate lose the fight by highly controversial split decision. 13 of 14 media scorecards had the bout 30-27 Pearson, while the 14th had Pearson winning 29–28. As a result, Pearson filed an appeal with the New Mexico Athletic Commission, "in hopes the decision is overturned, at the very least to a no-contest." The official decision was ultimately upheld. Despite an official loss on the scorecards, UFC president Dana White indicated that the organisation had ruled out the possibility of an immediate rematch and said that they would informally treat it as a win for Pearson, and that he would be compensated that way. UFC paid Pearson $30,000 as an unofficial win bonus

Pearson was expected to face Abel Trujillo on 16 August 2014 at UFC Fight Night 47. However, on 4 August, Trujillo pulled out of the bout and was replaced by Gray Maynard. He won the fight by TKO in the second round. After a close first round, early in the second round Pearson landed a combination which knocked Maynard down, causing the referee, Keith Peterson, to step in to stop the fight as Maynard was deemed not to be intelligently defending himself.

Pearson faced Al Iaquinta on 8 November 2014 at UFC Fight Night 55. Despite being the odds-on-favorite, Pearson lost the fight via TKO in the second round.

==== 2015 ====
Pearson faced Sam Stout on 14 March 2015 at UFC 185. Pearson won the fight via knockout in the second round dropping Stout with a left hook and finishing him with a right hand on the ground. Subsequently, Pearson won a Performance of the Night bonus.

Pearson faced Evan Dunham on 18 July 2015 at UFC Fight Night 72. He lost the fight via unanimous decision.

Pearson faced Paul Felder on 5 September 2015 at UFC 191. He won the back-and-forth fight by split decision.

==== 2016 ====
Pearson faced Francisco Trinaldo on 17 January at UFC Fight Night 81. He lost the fight via unanimous decision.

Pearson was expected to face Abel Trujillo on 20 March at UFC Fight Night 85. However, Trujillo was removed from the card on 12 March due to alleged visa issues which restricted his entry to Australia. As a result, Pearson faced Chad Laprise on the card. He won the fight via split decision.

Pearson was expected to face James Krause on 8 July at The Ultimate Fighter 23 Finale. However, Krause was pulled from the fight on 13 June for undisclosed reasons and replaced by Will Brooks. Pearson lost the fight via unanimous decision.

After the loss, Ross Pearson moved to the Welterweight division. Pearson explained that cutting less weight gives him more energy and better sleep. He repeatedly had renal and digestive issues due to the weight cut.

Pearson came in as a short notice replacement to face Jorge Masvidal in a welterweight bout on 30 July at UFC 201, filling in for an ill Siyar Bahadurzada. He lost the fight via unanimous decision.

A rescheduled bout with James Krause was scheduled for 19 November at UFC Fight Night 99. Subsequently, on 26 October, Krause pulled out of the fight citing a torn hamstring. He was replaced by Stevie Ray. Pearson lost the fight via split decision.

Despite the three-fight losing streak, Pearson did not want to retire. He wanted the UFC to host an event at Newcastle before retirement.

==== 2017 ====
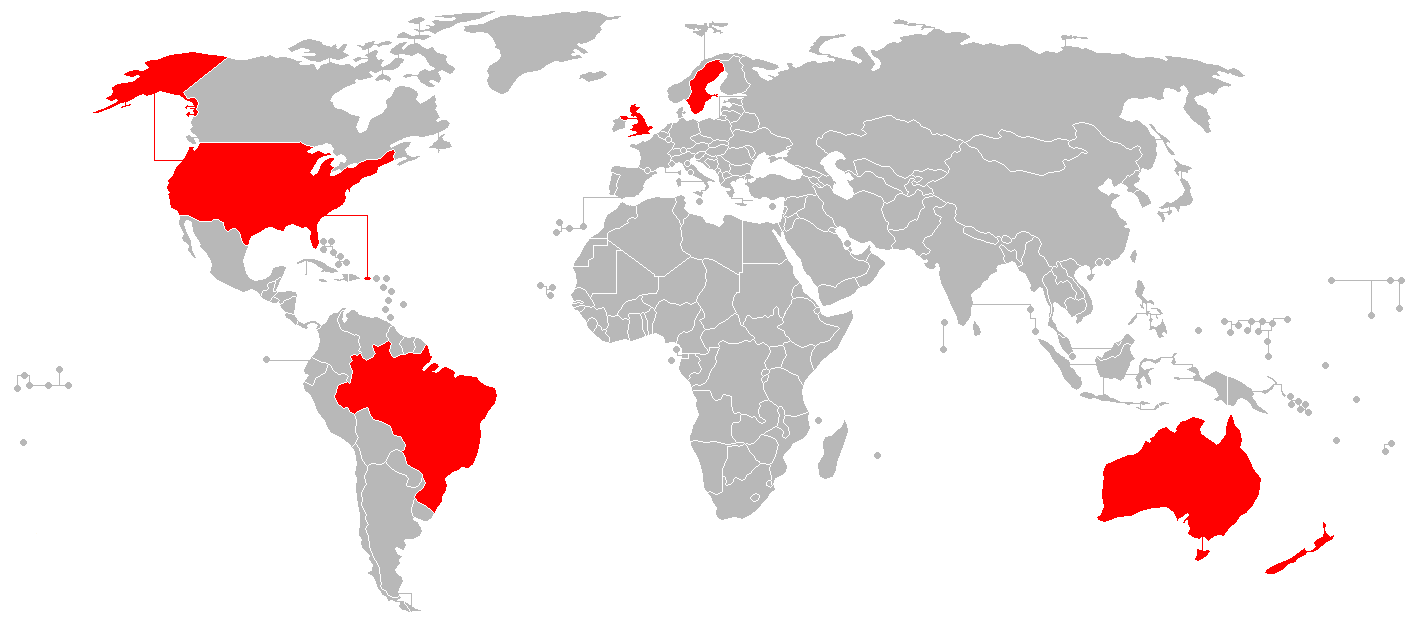
Countries where Ross Pearson has competed in as of August 2017

Pearson faced Dan Hooker on 11 June 2017 at UFC Fight Night 110. He lost the fight via knockout in the second round.

==== 2018 ====
Pearson faced Mizuto Hirota on 11 February 2018 at UFC 221. He won the fight via unanimous decision.

Pearson faced John Makdessi on 28 July 2018 at UFC on Fox 30. He lost the fight by unanimous decision. This fight earned him the Fight of the Night award.

Pearson was expected to face Joseph Duffy on 2 December 2018 at UFC Fight Night 142. However, Pearson announced on 7 November that he was out of the bout due to a broken nose and subsequent surgery to correct the injury.

==== 2019 ====
Pearson faced Desmond Green on 30 March 2019 at UFC on ESPN 2. He lost the fight via technical knockout in round one.

Pearson announced his retirement on 8 April 2019.

Pearson returned to MMA on 16 November to fight Davy Gallon at Probellum 1, losing the fight via KO.

== Fighting style ==
Pearson is known for his powerful punches. His favourite grappling technique is the armbar.

Pearson has stated that his hero is Randy Couture.

== Training ==
Pearson is a member of The Alliance MMA Gym. Nick Hands coaches Pearson's Muay Thai, Sean Casey coaches Pearson's boxing, and Barry Gibson serves as Pearson's strength and conditioning coach.

== Personal life ==
Pearson met his Australian wife, Kristie Jane Pearson when she worked as a ring girl for the UFC. Pearson moved to Australia to be with his wife. They have two daughters.

In his free time, Pearson does motocross.

== Filmography ==
=== TV series ===
Year	Title	Role	Notes
2009	The Ultimate Fighter: United States vs. United Kingdom	Himself	Winner of Lightweight division
2010	MMA Live	Himself	Episode dated 29 July 2010
2012	The Ultimate Fighter: The Smashes	Himself	Head coach of Team UK

=== Video games ===
Year	Title	Role	Notes
2010	UFC Undisputed 2010	Himself	Playable character
2012	UFC Undisputed 3	Himself	Playable character
2014	EA Sports UFC	Himself	Playable character
2016	EA Sports UFC 2	Himself	Playable character
2018	EA Sports UFC 3	Himself	Playable character

== Championships and accomplishments ==
=== Mixed martial arts ===
- Ultimate Fighting Championship
  - The Ultimate Fighter 9 Tournament Winner (Lightweight)
  - Fight of the Night (Three times) vs. Dennis Siver, Edson Barboza and John Makdessi
  - Performance of the Night (One time) vs. Sam Stout
  - UFC.com Awards
    - 2009: Ranked #5 Newcomer of the Year
- Ultimate Force
  - UF Lightweight Champion (One time)
  - One successful title defense
- Total Combat
  - Lightweight Champion
- Strike and Submit
  - Lightweight Champion

== Mixed martial arts record ==
Professional record breakdown
38 matches	20 wins	17 losses
By knockout	8	6
By submission	4	2
By decision	8	9
No contests	1	

Res.	Record	Opponent	Method	Event	Date	Round	Time	Location	Notes
Loss	20–17 (1)	Davy Gallon	KO (rolling thunder kick)	Probellum 1	16 November 2019	3	4:26	Brentwood, Essex, England	
Loss	20–16 (1)	Desmond Green	TKO (punches)	UFC on ESPN: Barboza vs. Gaethje	30 March 2019	1	2:52	Philadelphia, Pennsylvania, United States	
Loss	20–15 (1)	John Makdessi	Decision (unanimous)	UFC on Fox: Alvarez vs. Poirier 2	28 July 2018	3	5:00	Calgary, Alberta, Canada	Fight of the Night.
Win	20–14 (1)	Mizuto Hirota	Decision (unanimous)	UFC 221	11 February 2018	3	5:00	Perth, Australia	
Loss	19–14 (1)	Dan Hooker	KO (knee)	UFC Fight Night: Lewis vs. Hunt	11 June 2017	2	3:02	Auckland, New Zealand	
Loss	19–13 (1)	Stevie Ray	Decision (split)	UFC Fight Night: Mousasi vs. Hall 2	19 November 2016	3	5:00	Belfast, Northern Ireland	
Loss	19–12 (1)	Jorge Masvidal	Decision (unanimous)	UFC 201	30 July 2016	3	5:00	Atlanta, Georgia, United States	Welterweight bout.
Loss	19–11 (1)	Will Brooks	Decision (unanimous)	The Ultimate Fighter: Team Joanna vs. Team Cláudia Finale	8 July 2016	3	5:00	Las Vegas, Nevada, United States	
Win	19–10 (1)	Chad Laprise	Decision (split)	UFC Fight Night: Hunt vs. Mir	20 March 2016	3	5:00	Brisbane, Australia	
Loss	18–10 (1)	Francisco Trinaldo	Decision (unanimous)	UFC Fight Night: Dillashaw vs. Cruz	17 January 2016	3	5:00	Boston, Massachusetts, United States	
Win	18–9 (1)	Paul Felder	Decision (split)	UFC 191	5 September 2015	3	5:00	Las Vegas, Nevada, United States	
Loss	17–9 (1)	Evan Dunham	Decision (unanimous)	UFC Fight Night: Bisping vs. Leites	18 July 2015	3	5:00	Glasgow, Scotland, Scotland	
Win	17–8 (1)	Sam Stout	KO (punch)	UFC 185	14 March 2015	2	1:33	Dallas, Texas, United States	Performance of the Night.
Loss	16–8 (1)	Al Iaquinta	TKO (punches)	UFC Fight Night: Rockhold vs. Bisping	8 November 2014	2	1:39	Sydney, Australia	
Win	16–7 (1)	Gray Maynard	TKO (punches)	UFC Fight Night: Bader vs. St. Preux	16 August 2014	2	1:35	Bangor, Maine, United States	
Loss	15–7 (1)	Diego Sanchez	Decision (split)	UFC Fight Night: Henderson vs. Khabilov	7 June 2014	3	5:00	Albuquerque, New Mexico, United States	
NC	15–6 (1)	Melvin Guillard	NC (illegal knee)	UFC Fight Night: Machida vs. Munoz	26 October 2013	1	1:57	Manchester, England	Pearson was unable to continue after being cut by an accidental illegal knee.
Win	15–6	Ryan Couture	TKO (punches)	UFC on Fuel TV: Mousasi vs. Latifi	6 April 2013	2	3:45	Stockholm, Sweden	
Win	14–6	George Sotiropoulos	TKO (punches)	UFC on FX: Sotiropoulos vs. Pearson	15 December 2012	3	0:41	Gold Coast, Australia	Return to Lightweight.
Loss	13–6	Cub Swanson	TKO (punches)	UFC on FX: Maynard vs. Guida	22 June 2012	2	4:14	Atlantic City, New Jersey, United States	
Win	13–5	Junior Assunção	Decision (unanimous)	UFC 141	30 December 2011	3	5:00	Las Vegas, Nevada, United States	Featherweight debut.
Loss	12–5	Edson Barboza	Decision (split)	UFC 134	27 August 2011	3	5:00	Rio de Janeiro, Brazil	Fight of the Night.
Win	12–4	Spencer Fisher	Decision (unanimous)	UFC 127	27 February 2011	3	5:00	Sydney, Australia	
Loss	11–4	Cole Miller	Submission (rear-naked choke)	UFC Fight Night: Marquardt vs. Palhares	15 September 2010	2	1:49	Austin, Texas, United States	
Win	11–3	Dennis Siver	Decision (unanimous)	UFC Fight Night: Florian vs. Gomi	31 March 2010	3	5:00	Charlotte, North Carolina, United States	Fight of the Night.
Win	10–3	Aaron Riley	TKO (doctor stoppage)	UFC 105	14 November 2009	2	4:38	Manchester, England	
Win	9–3	Andre Winner	Decision (unanimous)	The Ultimate Fighter: United States vs. United Kingdom Finale	20 June 2009	3	5:00	Las Vegas, Nevada, United States	Won The Ultimate Fighter 9 Lightweight tournament.
Win	8–3	Ian Jones	Submission (rear-naked choke)	Ultimate Force: Nemesis	1 November 2008	1	3:33	Doncaster, England	Defended the UF Lightweight Championship.
Loss	7–3	Abdul Mohamed	Decision (unanimous)	Cage Gladiators 9: Beatdown	4 October 2008	3	5:00	Liverpool, England	
Win	7–2	Cedric Celerier	TKO (submission to punches)	MMA Total Combat 24	31 May 2008	1	2:35	London, England	
Win	6–2	Aidan Marron	Submission (armbar)	Ultimate Force: Punishment	3 May 2008	3	4:34	Doncaster, England	Won the vacant UF Lightweight Championship.
Win	5–2	Sami Berik	Submission (triangle choke)	Strike and Submit 6	13 April 2008	1	0:37	Gateshead, England	
Win	4–2	Mark Spencer	TKO (punches)	MMA Total Combat 23	23 February 2008	1	3:44	Cornwall, England	
Win	3–2	Steve Tetley	Submission (armbar)	CWFC: Enter The Rough House 5	8 December 2007	1	4:46	Nottingham, England	
Win	2–2	Gavin Bradley	KO (punch)	MMA Total Combat 22	24 November 2007	1	2:05	Cornwall, England	
Loss	1–2	Curt Warburton	TKO (doctor stoppage)	MMA Total Combat 21	22 September 2007	1	5:00	Cornwall, England	
Win	1–1	Will Burke	Decision	MMA Total Combat 21	22 September 2007	3	5:00	Cornwall, England	
Loss	0–1	Chris Hughes	Submission (rear-naked choke)	HOP 1: Fight Night 1	12 December 2004	2	2:33	Swansea, Wales	

=== Mixed martial arts exhibition record ===
Exhibition record breakdown		
3 matches	3 wins	0 losses
By knockout	1	0
By submission	1	0
By decision	1	0

Res.	Record	Opponent	Method	Event	Date	Round	Time	Location	Notes
Win	3–0	Jason Dent	Decision (unanimous)	The Ultimate Fighter: United States vs. United Kingdom	7 June 2009 (airdate)	3	5:00	Las Vegas, Nevada, United States	Semi-finals.
Win	2–0	Richie Whitson	Submission (armbar)	The Ultimate Fighter: United States vs. United Kingdom	13 May 2009 (airdate)	1	3:40	Las Vegas, Nevada, United States	Quarter-finals.
Win	1–0	A.J. Wenn	TKO (punches)	The Ultimate Fighter: United States vs. United Kingdom	1 April 2009 (airdate)	2	0:21	Las Vegas, Nevada, United States	Preliminary bout.

== Professional boxing record ==
2 fights	1 win	1 loss
By knockout	1	1

No.	Result	Record	Opponent	Type	Round, time	Date	Location	Notes
2	Loss	1–1	Max Reeves	TKO	1 (8) 1:09	27 November 2021	Lucknow Football Oval, Bairnsdale	
1	Win	1–0	Salar King	TKO	2 (4) 2:21	15 May 2019	The Star, Sydney, Australia	

== See also ==
- List of current UFC fighters
- List of male mixed martial artists
