= 2022 in Brave Combat Federation =

Brave Combat Federation
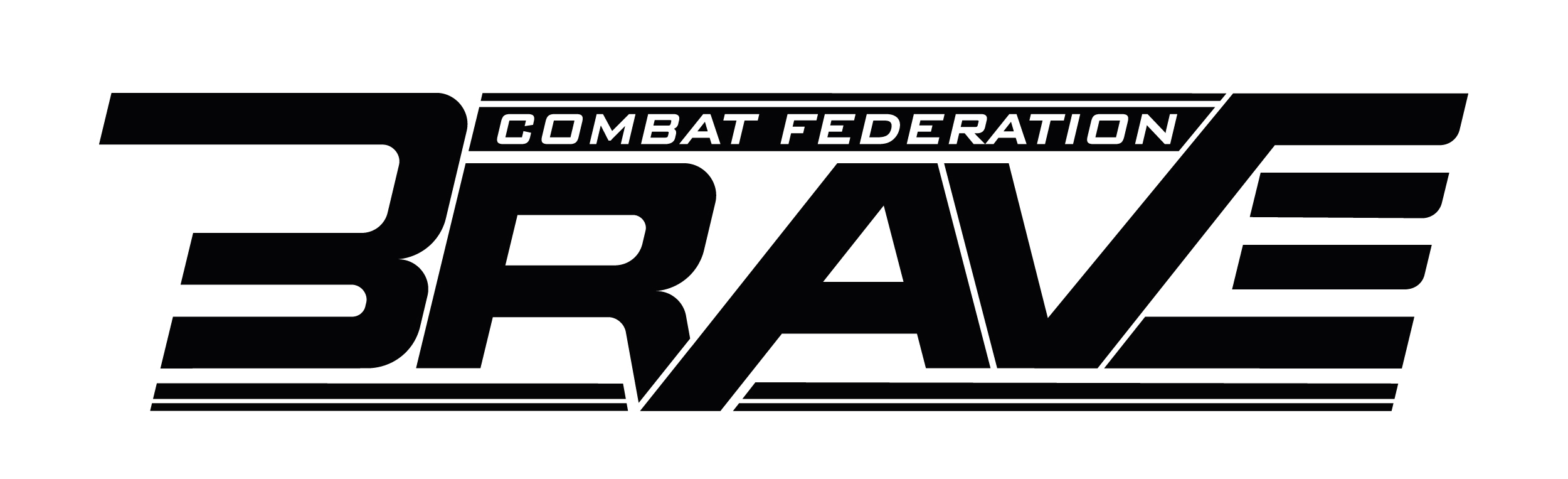

Events
- Total events: 13
- Brave CF: 12
- Road To Events: 1

The year 2022 was the 7th year in the history of the Brave Combat Federation, a mixed martial arts promotion based in Bahrain.

== List of events ==
Brave CF
No.	Event	Date	Venue	Location
1	Road to BRAVE CF: Korea	January 8, 2022	Inter Burgo Exco Hotel	Daegu, South Korea
2	BRAVE CF 57	March 11, 2022	Khalifa Sports City Stadium	Isa Town, Bahrain
3	BRAVE CF 58	April 30, 2022	Samsan World Gymnasium	Incheon, South Korea
4	BRAVE CF 59	June 18, 2022	Amphitheater of Bukhara	Bukhara, Uzbekistan
5	BRAVE CF 60	July 30, 2022	National Stadium	Isa Town, Bahrain
6	BRAVE CF 61	August 6, 2022	Maritim Hotel	Bonn, Germany
7	BRAVE CF 62	September 30, 2022	Baluan Sholak Sports Palace	Almaty, Kazakhstan
8	BRAVE CF 63: Two Title Fights	October 19, 2022	Khalifa Sports City Stadium	Isa Town, Bahrain
9	BRAVE CF 64: African All Star	October 22, 2022	Khalifa Sports City Stadium	Isa Town, Bahrain
10	BRAVE CF 65: Rumble in the Kingdom	October 28, 2022	Khalifa Sports City Stadium	Isa Town, Bahrain
11	BRAVE CF 66	November 26, 2022	Politeknik Pariwisata	Bali, Indonesia
12	BRAVE CF 67	December 12, 2022	Hall B	Manama, Bahrain
13	BRAVE CF 68	December 17, 2022	Maritim Hotel	Düsseldorf, Germany

== BRAVE CF Flyweight Tournament ==
=== Background ===
BRAVE Combat Federation will look to crown its first Flyweight world champion with a 8-man tournament.

The eight participants of the tournament were revealed. They included the former Bantamweight World Champion Zach Makovsky, the formers UFC fighter Dustin Ortiz, Ali Bagautinov, Jose Torres as well as Abdul Hussein, Flavio de Queiroz, Velimurad Alkhasov and the former Cage Fury Flyweight Champion Sean Santella.

=== BRAVE CF Flyweight Tournament bracket ===
Quarter-finals
(Brazil) Flavio de Queiroz	3r.
(Russia) Velimurad Alkhasov	UD
(Finland) Abdul Hussein	-
(United States) Zach Makovsky	Bye^{1}
(Russia) Ali Bagautinov	UD
(United States) Dustin Ortiz	3r.
(United States) Jose Torres	UD
(Republic of Ireland) Blaine O’Driscoll^{2}	3r.

Semi-finals
(Russia) Velimurad Alkhasov	SD
(United States) Zach Makovsky	3r.
(Russia) Ali Bagautinov	TKO
(United States) Sean Santella ^{3}	1r.

Final
(Russia) Velimurad Alkhasov
(Russia) Ali Bagautinov

^{1}Zach Makovsky got a Quarterfinal bye as Abdul Hussein pulled out due to illness during the weightcut.

^{2}First bout between Torres and Sean Santella ended in a draw at Brave CF 42; Santella was replaced for the rematch by Blaine O’Driscoll due to injury and the bout was held at the Catchweight of 61 kg

^{3}Torres pulled out due to weight cut difficulties and was replaced by Sean Santella

== Road to BRAVE CF: Korea ==
Road to BRAVE CF: Korea
- Promotion: Brave Combat Federation; Beast Championship Federation
- Date: January 7, 2022
- City: Daegu, South Korea

Road to BRAVE CF: Korea was a mixed martial arts event held by Brave Combat Federation in partnership with Beast Championship Federation on January 7, 2022, in Daegu, South Korea.

=== Results ===
Road to BRAVE CF: Korea
Weight Class				Method	Round	Time	Notes
Catchweight 68 kg	(South Korea) Jae Hyuk Bang	def.	(South Korea) Min Hyeok Lee	Decision (Split)	3	5:00	
Lightweight 70 kg	(South Korea) Sung Chan Hong	def.	(South Korea) Song Ha Lee	Decision (Unanimous)	3	5:00	
Lightweight 70 kg	(South Korea) Young Hoon Lee	def.	(South Korea) Yong Wan Jeong	TKO (Elbows)	1	0:49	
Flyweight 57 kg	(South Korea) Jun Young Lee	def.	(South Korea) Hyo Je Cho	TKO (Punch)	1	3:30	
Featherweight 66 kg	(South Korea) Sung Chul Lee	def.	(South Korea) Su Hyeok Mae	TKO (Injury)	1	5:00	
Lightweight 70 kg	(South Korea) Min Son	def.	(South Korea) Seong Hyeo Choi	TKO (Punches)	1	4:30	
Middleweight 84 kg	(South Korea) Ji Hoon Nam	def.	(South Korea) Jang Yul Hamn	Decision (Unanimous)	2	5:00	
Flyweight 57 kg	(South Korea) Seung Chul Lee	def.	(South Korea) Min Soo Kwon	Submission (Rear-Naked Choke)	3	4:10	
Catchweight 87 kg	(South Korea) Kyu Ho Song	def.	(South Korea) Sung Jong Lee	Decision (Unanimous)	1	5:00	Combat Wrestling
Bantamweight 61 kg	(South Korea) Dong Il Kim	def.	(South Korea) Yong Ho Jang	TKO	2	4:50	

== BRAVE CF 57 ==
BRAVE CF 57
- Promotion: Brave Combat Federation
- Date: March 11, 2022
- Venue: Khalifa Sports City Stadium
- City: Isa Town, Bahrain

BRAVE CF 57 was a mixed martial arts event held by Brave Combat Federation on March 11, 2022, at the Khalifa Sports City Stadium in Isa Town, Bahrain.

=== Background ===
A BRAVE CF Bantamweight Championship bout for the vacant title between Hamza Kooheji and Brad Katona was scheduled as the event headliner.

Two additional title fights were scheduled for the event: a BRAVE CF Light Heavyweight Championship bout for the vacant title between Mohamed Said Maalem and Mohammad Fakhreddine, as well as an interim BRAVE CF Lightweight Championship bout between Abdisalam Kubanychbek and Amin Ayoub.

A flyweight bout between Rizvan Abuev and Asu Almabayev was planned for the event. However, Abuev was forced to pull out due to broken ankle. Almabayev takes on Imram Magaramov who step in on 2 weeks notice for the fight.

=== Results ===
BRAVE CF 57
Weight Class				Method	Round	Time	Notes
Bantamweight 61 kg	(Canada) Brad Katona	def.	(Bahrain) Hamza Kooheji	Decision (Split)	5	5:00	For the vacant BRAVE CF Bantamweight Championship
Light Heavyweight 93 kg	(Lebanon) Mohammad Fakhreddine	def.	(Algeria) Mohamed Said Maalem	TKO (punches)	2	1:17	For the vacant BRAVE CF Light Heavyweight Championship
Lightweight 70 kg	(Kyrgyzstan) Abdisalam Kubanychbek	–	(Brazil) Cleiton Silva	No Contest (Accidental Strikes to Back of Head)	1	4:41	For the interim BRAVE CF Lightweight Championship
Lightweight 70 kg	(England) Sam Patterson	def.	(Russia) Khunkar-Pasha Osmaev	TKO (Punches)	2	3:53	
Lightweight 70 kg	(Azerbaijan) Agshin Babaev	–	(Switzerland) Husein Kadimagomaev	No Contest (Accidental Groin Strike)	1	1:41	
Preliminary Card
Flyweight 57 kg	(Kazakhstan) Asu Almabayev	def.	(Azerbaijan) Imram Magaramov	Decision (Unanimous)	3	5:00	
Lightweight 70 kg	(Russia) Kamil Magomedov	def.	(Afghanistan) Sayed Murtaza Sadat	Submission (Arm-Triangle Choke)	1	4:07	
Light Heavyweight 93 kg	(Bahrain) Murtaza Talha	def.	(Georgia (country)) Mikheil Sazhiniani	Submission (Armbar)	1	4:22	
Bantamweight 61 kg	(Egypt) Maysara Mohamed	def.	(India) Mohammed Farhad	TKO (Punches)	2	4:31	
Catchweight 59 kg	(Russia) Magomed Idrisov	def.	(Afghanistan) Rahmatullah Yousufzai	Decision (Unanimous)	3	5:00	
Bantamweight 61 kg	(Bahrain) Abdulla Al Yaqoob	def.	(Egypt) Omar Emad	Technical Decision (Unanimous)	3	1:29	Accidental eye poke rendered Emad unable to continue.
Lightweight 70 kg	(Bahrain) Husain Muhammad	def.	(Lebanon) Adon Ayoub	Decision (Unanimous)	3	3:00	Amateur Bout

== BRAVE CF 58 ==
BRAVE CF 58
- Promotion: Brave Combat Federation; Beast Championship Federation
- Date: April 30, 2022
- Venue: Samsan World Gymnasium
- City: Incheon, South Korea

BRAVE CF 58 was a mixed martial arts event held by Brave Combat Federation in partnership with Beast Championship Federation on April 30, 2022, at the Samsan World Gymnasium in Incheon, South Korea. South Korea will become the 26th country to host a BRAVE CF show.

=== Background ===
The main event was set to feature a featherweight bout between Tae Kyun Kim and Roman Bogatov, but Kim has been forced to pull out due to a hand injury and the bout with Bogatov has been scratched. A Middleweight bout between Mzwandile Hlongwa and In Jae La, which has been previously announced for the card, will now serve as the main event.

A super lightweight bout between Maciej Gierszewski and Mihail Kotruţă was planned for the event. However, Kotruţă was out due to injury and Issa Isakov was in against Gierszewski.

=== Results ===
BRAVE CF 58
Weight Class				Method	Round	Time	Notes
Middleweight 84 kg	(South Korea) In Jae La	def.	(South Africa) Mzwandile Hlongwa	Decision (Unanimous)	3	5:00	
Super Welterweight 79.5 kg	(Poland) Marcin Bandel	def.	(Brazil) Luis Felipe	Decision (Unanimous)	3	5:00	
Lightweight 70 kg	(South Korea) Ho Taek Oh	def.	(Philippines) Rolando Dy	Submission (Rear-Naked Choke)	1	3:29	
Super Lightweight 75 kg	(Belgium) Issa Isakov	def.	(Poland) Maciek Gierszewski	TKO (Elbows and Punches)	2	2:31	
Catchweight 67 kg	(South Korea) Jae Hyuk Bang	def.	(Italy) Walter Cogliandro	Decision (Unanimous)	3	5:00	
Featherweight 66 kg	(Saudi Arabia) Abdullah Al-Qahtani	def.	(South Korea) Yong Soo Jung	Decision (Unanimous)	3	5:00	
Catchweight 77 kg	(France) Axel Sola	def.	(South Korea) Yoon Sung Jang	Decision (Unanimous)	3	5:00	
Flyweight 57 kg	(Singapore) Sim Kai Xiong	def.	(South Korea) Seung Chul Lee	Decision (Unanimous)	3	5:00	
W.Atomweight 48 kg	(South Korea) Yerin Hong	def.	(Singapore) Gillian Goh	Decision (Unanimous)	3	5:00	
Heavyweight 120 kg	(South Korea) Myung Hwan Kim	def.	(South Korea) Jun Soo Lim	TKO (Elbows and Punches)	1	4:15	
Featherweight 66 kg	(South Korea) Joo Sang Yoo	def.	(South Korea) Doo Seok Oh	Decision (Unanimous)	3	5:00	

== BRAVE CF 59 ==
BRAVE CF 59
- Promotion: Brave Combat Federation; Amir Temur Fighting Championship
- Date: June 18, 2022
- Venue: Amphitheater Bukhara
- City: Bukhara, Uzbekistan

BRAVE CF 59 was a mixed martial arts event held by Brave Combat Federation in partnership with Amir Temur Fighting Championship on June 18, 2022, in Bukhara, Uzbekistan. Uzbekistan will become the 27th country to host a BRAVE CF show.

=== Background ===
Asuper lightweight bout between Baz Mohammad and Ayub Gazievwas planned for the event. However, Mohammad pulled out in early June due to undisclosed reasons and he was replaced by Sanjarbek Erkinov.

=== Results ===
BRAVE CF 59
Weight Class				Method	Round	Time	Notes
Lightweight 70 kg	(Kyrgyzstan) Abdisalam Kubanychbek	def.	(Kazakhstan) Olzhas Eskaraev	Decision (Unanimous)	5	5:00	For the interim BRAVE CF Lightweight Championship
Super Welterweight 79.5 kg	(Austria) Ismail Naurdiev	def.	(Kyrgyzstan) Bekten Zheenbekov	TKO (Punches)	1	2:26	
Lightweight 70 kg	(Kyrgyzstan) Nemat Abdrashitov	def.	(Uzbekistan) Alikhon Khasanov	TKO (Punches)	1	2:46	
Featherweight 66 kg	(Kazakhstan) Ilyar Askhanov	def.	(Uzbekistan) Khusan Atabayev	Submission (Rear-Naked Choke)	1	1:37	
Lightweight 70 kg	(Kazakhstan) Nurzhan Akishev	def.	(Uzbekistan) Otabek Toxirov	Submission (Guillotine Choke)	3	0:24	
Super Lightweight 75 kg	(Uzbekistan) Sanjarbek Erkinov	def.	(Austria) Ayub Gaziev	TKO (Punches)	2	2:35	
Preliminary Card
Catchweight 68 kg	(Uzbekistan) Sharif Kushaev	def.	(Kyrgyzstan) Bakytbek Uulu Nuristan	TKO (Punches)	1	0:18	
Middleweight 84 kg	(Uzbekistan) Mamurzhon Khamidov	def.	(Kyrgyzstan) Erzhan Zhanybekov	TKO (Punches)	2	4:30	
Super Welterweight 79.5 kg	(Uzbekistan) Khotam Boynazarov	def.	(Kyrgyzstan) Altynbek Arykbaev	TKO (Punches)	2	4:08	
Super Lightweight 75 kg	(Uzbekistan) Mashrabjon Ruziboev	def.	(Kyrgyzstan) Niyazidin Risbaev	Submission (Guillotine Choke)	1	0:18	
Bantamweight 61 kg	(Uzbekistan) Marufjon Mamarazikov	def.	(Tajikistan) Abdamizonda Saidkhumoyun	Submission (Rear-Naked Choke)	1	2:08	

== BRAVE CF 60 ==
BRAVE CF 60
- Promotion: Brave Combat Federation
- Date: July 30, 2022
- Venue: National Stadium
- City: Isa Town, Bahrain

BRAVE CF 60 was a mixed martial arts event held by Brave Combat Federation on July 30, 2022, at the National Stadium, in Isa Town, Bahrain.

=== Background ===
The event was originally expected to take place at the Goiânia Arena in Goiânia, Brazil on July 30. However, on July 24, due to unforeseen circumstances the event was moved from Brazil to the Kingdom of Bahrain.

=== Results ===
BRAVE CF 60
Weight Class				Method	Round	Time	Notes
Lightweight 70 kg	(Brazil) Lucas Martins	def.	(Brazil) Henrique Marques	TKO (Punches)	1	1:10	
Super Lightweight 75 kg	(Moldova) Mihail Kotruta	def.	(Brazil) Luan Santiago	Submission (Arm-Triangle Choke)	1	3:18	
Super Lightweight 75 kg	(Brazil) Cleiton Silva	def.	(Brazil) Leonardo Mafra	KO (Spinning Backfist)	2	2:42	
Flyweight 57 kg	(Kazakhstan) Asu Almabayev	def.	(United States) Zach Makovsky	Decision (Split)	3	5:00	
Flyweight 57 kg	(Brazil) Flavio de Queiroz	def.	(Brazil) Igor Taylon	TKO (Punches)	2	4:56	
Super Welterweight 79.5 kg	(Brazil) Luiz Cado	def.	(Brazil) Luis Felipe Dias	TKO (Punch)	3	0:14	
Flyweight 57 kg	(Brazil) Edilceu Alves	def.	(United States) Sean Santella	Decision (Unanimous)	3	5:00	
Bantamweight 61 kg	(South Africa) Nkosi Ndebele	def.	(Colombia) Eduardo Mora	Decision (Unanimous)	3	5:00	

== BRAVE CF 61 ==
BRAVE CF 61
- Promotion: Brave Combat Federation; National Fighting Championship
- Date: August 6, 2022
- Venue: Maritim Hotel
- City: Bonn, Germany

BRAVE CF 61 was a mixed martial arts event held by Brave Combat Federation in partnership with National Fighting Championship on August 6, 2022, at the Maritim Hotel in Bonn, Germany. Germany will become the 28th country to host a BRAVE CF show.

=== Results ===
BRAVE CF 61
Weight Class				Method	Round	Time	Notes
Super Lightweight 75 kg	(Brazil) Joilton Lutterbach	def.	(Germany) Marcel Grabinski	TKO (Punches)	1	1:52	
Catchweight 69 kg	(Germany) Max Coga	def.	(Afghanistan) Zafar Mohsen	Decision (Unanimous)	3	5:00	
Welterweight 77 kg	(Germany) Islam Dulatov	def.	(Brazil) Kleverson Cruz da Silva	TKO (Punches)	1	2:47	
Catchweight 73 kg	(Switzerland) Husein Kadimagomaev	def.	(Brazil) José Marcos Santiago Lima	Decision (Unanimous)	3	5:00	
Bantamweight 61 kg	(Russia) Gamzat Magomedov	def.	(Serbia) Borislav Nikolić	Decision (Unanimous)	3	5:00	
Featherweight 66 kg	(Netherlands) Jarno Errens	def.	(Tajikistan) Alisher Abdullaev	Decision (Unanimous)	3	5:00	
Super Lightweight 75 kg	(Belgium) Issa Isakov	def.	(Lebanon) Ahmed Labban	Decision (Unanimous)	3	5:00	
Preliminary Card
Catchweight 89 kg	(South Africa) Chad Hanekom	def.	(Poland) Mateusz Janur	Decision (Unanimous)	3	5:00	
Welterweight 77 kg	(France) Axel Sola	def.	(Germany) Wladimir Holodenko	Decision (Unanimous)	3	5:00	
Heavyweight 120 kg	(Bulgaria) Lazar Todev	def.	(Germany) Patrick Vespaziani	TKO (Elbows)	3	3:23	

== BRAVE CF 62 ==
BRAVE CF 62
- Promotion: Brave Combat Federation; Octagon League
- Date: September 30, 2022
- Venue: Baluan Sholak Sports Palace
- City: Almaty, Kazakhstan

BRAVE CF 62 will be a mixed martial arts event held by Brave Combat Federation in partnership with Octagon League on September 30, 2022, at the Baluan Sholak Sports Palace in Almaty, Kazakhstan.

=== Background ===
The event will feature a lightweight bout between former UFC fighter Rolando Dy and the Kazakhstan National Champion in Combat Sambo Olzhas Eskaraev.

=== Results ===
BRAVE CF 62
Weight Class				Method	Round	Time	Notes
Lightweight 70 kg	(Kazakhstan) Olzhas Eskaraev	def.	(Philippines) Rolando Dy	KO (Punches)	2	3:40	
Featherweight 66 kg	(Kazakhstan) Nurzhan Akishev	def.	(Pakistan) Mehmosh Raza	Decision (Unanimous)	3	5:00	
Featherweight 66 kg	(Kazakhstan) Ilyar Askhanov	def.	(Kyrgyzstan) Rasul Tezekbaev	Decision (Unanimous)	3	5:00	
Lightweight 70 kg	(Russia) Akhmed Shervaniev	def.	(Russia) Kamil Magomedov	Decision (Split)	3	5:00	
Middleweight 85 kg	(Bahrain) Murtaza Talha Ali	def.	(Kazakhstan) Kirill Khomitsky	Submission (Rear-Naked Choke)	1	2:40	
Featherweight 65 kg	(Kyrgyzstan) Ilyor Bakhtiyar Uulu	def.	(Afghanistan) Abdullah Al-Qahtani	Decision (Split)	3	5:00	
Lightweight 70 kg	(Russia) Anzor Abdulkhozhaev	def.	(Uzbekistan) Sanjarbek Erkinov	Submission (Guillotine Choke)	3	0:49	
Octagon 35
Welterweight 77 kg	(Russia) Magomed Magomedov (c)	def.	(Kazakhstan) Bauyrzhan Kuanyshbayev	Decision (Unanimous)	5	5:00	For the Octagon League Welterweight Championship
Flyweight 57 kg	(Azerbaijan) Royal Leylizade	def.	(Kazakhstan) Aktore Batyrbek	Decision (Unanimous)	3	5:00	
Welterweight 77 kg	(Kazakhstan) Rinat Sagyntay	def.	(Uzbekistan) Davlatbek Khozhiev	TKO (Punches)	2	3:47	
Bantamweight 61 kg	(Kazakhstan) Aivaz Aidinov	def.	(Tajikistan) Mekhrdod Umarov	Decision (Unanimous)	3	5:00	
Lightweight 70 kg	(Kyrgyzstan) Zhakshylyk Myrzabekov	def.	(Uzbekistan) Jakhongir Jumaev	Decision (Unanimous)	3	5:00	
Bantamweight 61 kg	(Kazakhstan) Sundet Aytul	def.	(Kyrgyzstan) Oybek Dzhuraev	Submission (Rear-Naked Choke)	3	2:10	

== BRAVE CF 63: Two Title Fights ==
BRAVE CF 63: Two Title Fights
- Promotion: Brave Combat Federation
- Date: October 19, 2022
- Venue: Khalifa Sports City Stadium
- City: Isa Town, Bahrain

BRAVE CF 63: Two Title Fights was a mixed martial arts event held by Brave Combat Federation on October 19, 2022, at the Khalifa Sports City Stadium in Isa Town, Bahrain.

=== Background ===
This event featured two title fights, first a super welterweight bout between Marcin Bandel and Ismail Naurdiev for the vacant BRAVE Combat Federation Super Welterweight Championship as event headliner and in the co-main event a bantamweight bout the champion Brad Katona and Gamzat Magomedov for the BRAVE Combat Federation Bantamweight Championship.

=== Results ===
BRAVE CF 63
Weight Class				Method	Round	Time	Notes
Super Welterweight 79.5 kg	(Poland) Marcin Bandel	def.	(Austria) Ismail Naurdiev	Submission (Armbar)	1	1:20	For the vacant BRAVE CF Super Welterweight Championship
Bantamweight 61 kg	(Canada) Brad Katona (c)	def.	(Russia) Gamzat Magomedov	Decision (Unanimous)	5	5:00	For the BRAVE CF Bantamweight Championship
Super Welterweight 79.5 kg	(Russia) Kamal Magomedov	def.	(Finland) Olli Santalahti	TKO (Doctor Stoppage)	3	1:08	
Featherweight 66 kg	(Kyrgyzstan) Nemat Abdrashitov	def.	(Brazil) Marcos Vinícius Costa	KO (Punch)	2	2:50	
Welterweight 77 kg	(Pakistan) Abbas Khan	def.	(Italy) Michael Reali	Submission (Armbar)	1	3:05	

== BRAVE CF 64: African All Star ==
BRAVE CF 64: African All Star
- Promotion: Brave Combat Federation
- Date: October 22, 2022
- Venue: Khalifa Sports City Stadium
- City: Isa Town, Bahrain

BRAVE CF 64: African All Star was a mixed martial arts event held by Brave Combat Federation on October 22, 2022, at the Khalifa Sports City Stadium in Isa Town, Bahrain.

=== Background ===
This main event featured a title fight for the vacant BRAVE Combat Federation Super Welterweight Championship between Tae Kyun Kim and Roman Bogatov as event headliner.

=== Results ===
BRAVE CF 64
Weight Class				Method	Round	Time	Notes
Featherweight 66 kg	(Russia) Roman Bogatov	def.	(South Korea) Tae Kyun Kim	Decision (Split)	5	5:00	For the vacant BRAVE CF Featherweight Championship
Super Welterweight 79 kg	(Bahrain) Zagid Gaidarov	def.	(South Africa) Brendan Lesar	Submission (Rear-Naked Choke)	2	1:24	
Middleweight 84 kg	(Russia) Abusupyan Alikhanov	def.	(South Africa) Mzwandile Hlongwa	Decision (Unanimous)	3	5:00	
Light Heavymweight 93 kg	(Burkina Faso) Israel Mano	def.	(France) Remy Serge	Decision (Unanimous)	3	3:00	Amateur Bout

== BRAVE CF 65: Rumble in the Kingdom ==
BRAVE CF 65: Rumble in the Kingdom
- Promotion: Brave Combat Federation
- Date: October 28, 2022
- Venue: Khalifa Sports City Stadium
- City: Isa Town, Bahrain

BRAVE CF 65: Rumble in the Kingdom was a mixed martial arts event held by Brave Combat Federation on October 28, 2022, at the Khalifa Sports City Stadium in Isa Town, Bahrain.

=== Results ===
BRAVE CF 65
Weight Class				Method	Round	Time	Notes
Featherweight 66 kg	(Bahrain) Hamza Kooheji	def.	(Colombia) Eduardo Mora	Decision (Unanimous)	3	5:00	
Bantamweight 61 kg	(United States) Jose Torres	def.	(Jordan) Izzeddine Al Derbani	Decision (Unanimous)	3	5:00	
Super Welterweight 79.5 kg	(Lebanon) Ahmed Labban	def.	(England) Carl Booth	Decision (Unanimous)	3	5:00	
Light Heavyweight 93 kg	(Bahrain) Magomed Gadzhiyasulov	def.	(Algeria) Mohamed Said Maalem	Decision (Unanimous)	3	5:00	
Heavyweight 120 kg	(Bahrain) Shamil Gaziev	def.	(Lithuania) Pavel Dailidko	TKO (Punches)	2	0:46	
Catchweight 59 kg	(Iraq) Issa Salem	def.	(Bahrain) Hussain Ayyad	Decision (Split)	3	5:00	
Preliminary Card
Flyweight 57 kg	(Egypt) Maysara Mohamed	-	(Jordan) Frieh Al Harahsheh	Draw (Majority)	3	5:00	
Catchweight 77 kg	(Switzerland) Kevin Ruart	def.	(Egypt) Omar El Dafrawy	Decision (Unanimous)	3	5:00	
Bantamweight 61 kg	(Bahrain) Abdulla Al Yaqoob	def.	(Jordan) Fouad Al Shami	Decision (Split)	3	5:00	
Flyweight 57 kg	(Bahrain) Mohammed Zuhair	def.	(India) Ganesh Raj	Decision (Unanimous)	3	3:00	Amateur Bout
Catchweight 67 kg	(Iraq) Mohammed Salah Madhi	def.	(Bahrain) Ahmed Zayed	TKO (Punches)	3	2:06	Amateur Bout

== BRAVE CF 66 ==
BRAVE CF 66
- Promotion: Brave Combat Federation
- Date: November 26, 2022
- Venue: Politeknik Pariwisata
- City: Bali, Indonesia

BRAVE CF 66 was a mixed martial arts event held by Brave Combat Federation on November 26, 2022, at the Politeknik Pariwisata in Bali, Indonesia.

=== Results ===
BRAVE CF 66
Weight Class				Method	Round	Time	Notes
Middleweight 84 kg	(South Africa) Chad Hanekom	def.	(South Korea) In Jae La	KO (Elbow)	1	1:35	
Flyweight 57 kg	(Kazakhstan) Asu Almabayev	def.	(Philippines) Kenneth Maningat	Submission (Rear-Naked Choke)	2	3:38	
Bantamweight 61 kg	(South Africa) Nkosi Ndebele	def.	(Indonesia) Fajar	TKO (Punches)	2	2:37	
Heavyweight 120 kg	(New Zealand) Junior Tafa	def.	(France) Nicolas Djurdjević	TKO (Punches)	1	2:02	
Middleweight 84 kg	(Bahrain) Zagid Gaidarov	def.	(Australia) Abel Brites	TKO (Punches)	1	2:37	
Preliminary Card
Bantamweight 61 kg	(Philippines) Ruel Pañales	-	(India) Mohammad Farhad	No Contest (Accidental Low Blow)	2	2:42	
Flyweight 57 kg	(South Africa) Dansheel Moodley	def.	(Philippines) Jenel Lausa	Decision (Unanimous)	3	5:00	
W.Atomweight 48 kg	(Singapore) Shi Yin Tan	def.	(Singapore) Gillian Goh	Decision (Unanimous)	3	5:00	
Light Heavyweight 93 kg	(Indonesia) Oloan Silalahi	def.	(Indonesia) Wilem Munster	Submission (Rear-Naked Choke)	1	1:29	
Feattherweight 66 kg	(Indonesia) Randy Febian	def.	(Indonesia) Achterson Rumainum	TKO (Punches)	1	2:00	

== BRAVE CF 67 ==
BRAVE CF 67
- Promotion: Brave Combat Federation
- Date: December 12, 2022
- Venue: Hall B
- City: Manama, Bahrain

BRAVE CF 67 was a mixed martial arts event held by Brave Combat Federation on December 12, 2022, at the Hall B in Manama, Bahrain.

=== Results ===
BRAVE CF 67
Weight Class				Method	Round	Time	Notes
Super Welterweight 79.5 kg	(Bahrain) Eldar Eldarov	def.	(Belarus) Denis Maher	Submission (Kneebar)	1	4:53	
Featherweight 66 kg	(France) Yanis Ghemmouri	def.	(Russia) Bair Shtepin	TKO (Punches)	2	4:44	
Super Lightweight 75 kg	(Egypt) Mahmoud Fawzy	def.	(Tunisia) Wajdi Missaoui	KO (Punches)	1	1:28	
Middleweight 84 kg	(Egypt) Ahmed Sami	def.	(Egypt) Omar El Dafrawy	Decision (Unanimous)	3	5:00	
Featherweight 66 kg	(Egypt) Abdelghani Saber	def.	(Algeria) Aymene Souane	Submission (Rear-Naked Choke)	1	3:23	
Catchweight 98 kg	(Egypt) Osama ElSeady	def.	(Algeria) Mohamed Ali Sellam	KO (Front Kick)	1	0:54	
Super Lightweight 75 kg	(Lebanon) Anthony Zeidan	def.	(Egypt) Ayman Galal	KO (Punches)	2	1:24	
Lightweight 70 kg	(Iran) Mohsen Mohammadseifi	def.	(Algeria) Dhia Meguellati	TKO (Punches)	1	2:47	

== BRAVE CF 68 ==
BRAVE CF 68
- Promotion: Brave Combat Federation; National Fighting Championship
- Date: December 17, 2022
- Venue: Maritim Hotel
- City: Düsseldorf, Germany

BRAVE CF 68 will be a mixed martial arts event held by Brave Combat Federation in partnership with National Fighting Championship on December 17, 2022, at the Maritim Hotel in Düsseldorf, Germany.

=== Fight Card ===
BRAVE CF 68
Weight Class				Method	Round	Time	Notes
Super Lightweight 75 kg	(Brazil) Joilton Lutterbach	def.	(Moldova) Mihail Cotruţă	TKO (Punches)	1	2:53	For the interim BRAVE CF Super Lightweight Championship; Lutterbach missed weight and ineligible to win title
Super Welterweight 79.5 kg	(Belarus) Vadim Kutsyi	def.	(Austria) Ismail Naurdiev	TKO (Punches)	1	3:23	
Featherweight 66 kg	(Moldova) Pantelei Taran	def.	(Germany) Mohammed Trabelsi	Decision (Unanimous)	3	5:00	
Lightweight 70 kg	(Switzerland) Husein Kadimagomaev	def.	(Azerbaijan) Agshin Babayev	Submission (Guillotine Choke)	3	2:05	
Catchweight 77 kg	(France) Axel Sola	def.	(Brazil) Matheus Miranda	TKO (Punches)	2	0:34	
Preliminary Card
Middleweight 84 kg	(Germany) Julian Pennant	def.	(Montenegro) Alexander Djukic	Submission (Rear-Naked Choke)	1	4:21	
Lightweight 70 kg	(Austria) Gökhan Aksu	def.	(Germany) Christian Mach	KO (Punches)	1	1:05	
Featherweight 66 kg	(Azerbaijan) Ali Guliev	def.	(Brazil) Jefferson Oliveira	TKO (Punches)	2	3:55	

== See also ==
- List of current Brave CF fighters
- List of current mixed martial arts champions
- 2022 in UFC
- 2022 in Bellator MMA
- 2022 in ONE Championship
- 2022 in Absolute Championship Akhmat
- 2022 in Konfrontacja Sztuk Walki
- 2022 in Rizin Fighting Federation
- 2022 in LUX Fight League
- 2022 in AMC Fight Nights
- 2022 in Road FC
- 2022 Professional Fighters League season
- 2022 in Eagle Fighting Championship
- 2022 in Legacy Fighting Alliance
