= Curt Warburton =

English mixed martial arts fighter

- Born: 1981 (age 44–45); Bishop Auckland, England
- Other names: The War
- Height: 6 ft 0 in (1.83 m)
- Weight: 155 lb (70 kg; 11.1 st)
- Division: Lightweight; Welterweight
- Reach: 73 in (185 cm)
- Fighting out of: Bishop Auckland, England
- Team: Wolfslair MMA Academy
- Years active: 2007–2017

Mixed martial arts record
- Total: 20
- Wins: 14
- By knockout: 5
- By submission: 4
- By decision: 5
- Losses: 6
- By knockout: 1
- By submission: 3
- By decision: 2

Other information
- Mixed martial arts record from Sherdog
- Last updated on: 17 October 2010

Curt Warburton (born 1981) is an English mixed martial artist from Coundon, County Durham. He formerly trained at Wolfslair MMA Academy in Liverpool, England.

== Mixed martial arts career ==
=== Early career ===
Warburton's most notable achievement in the domestic circuit is his 1–1–1 record against The Ultimate Fighter 9 Lightweight Winner Ross Pearson. The first two fights took place at the semi-professional level, at Total Combat (UK) 18 and 19, which resulted in a draw in their first bout (in November 2006) and a submission (armbar) victory for Pearson (in February 2007). Warburton would gain a measure of revenge in September 2007, when he was victorious via TKO (doctor stoppage) in the only bout to feature on both competitors' professional records.

In February 2009, Warburton was entered into the draw for the British Fighting Championship organisation, which was intended to be one of the top tournaments in England, to serve as a showground for the top domestic fighters to participate in a knockout style tournament. Warburton was drawn against top domestic prospect in Che Mills.

However, a few months later, just before the start of the organisation's tournaments, the organisation was forced to disband due to the lack of progress in securing a television deal and financial issues, which meant the Mills fight was scrapped. This failure led to Warburton, who signed a contract months in advance, failing to compete, which led to over a year's gap between fights for Warburton. He finally returned against Toon Van Thielen and was victorious via submission (guillotine choke).

Warburton's final pre-UFC fight was against Tom Maguire and Warburton was victorious via unanimous decision. This win won him the Strike and Submit Lightweight title.

=== Ultimate Fighting Championship ===
Warburton, along with Wolfslair teammates Rob Broughton and Tom Blackledge joined the UFC. Shortly after joining the UFC, former opponent Ross Pearson gave Warburton a big endorsement of his skills, stating: "I expect big things from Curt, he's a good guy, he's a good friend now even if we have had three wars together."

Warburton made his UFC debut against UFC veteran, Spencer Fisher on 16 October 2010 at UFC 120. He lost the fight via unanimous decision.

Warburton faced Maciej Jewtuszko on 27 February 2011 at UFC 127. He handed Jewtuszko his first professional loss via unanimous decision (29–28, 29–28, 29–28).

Warburton next faced Joe Lauzon on 26 June 2011 at UFC on Versus 4. He lost the fight via first round submission. Following the loss, Warburton was released from the UFC.

=== BAMMA ===
Warburton made his BAMMA debut against Tim Newman on 10 December 2011 at BAMMA 8. He won the fight via unanimous decision.

Next he faced Lee Wieczorek at BAMMA 10 on 15 September 2012, where he continued his winning streak via unanimous decision to earn himself a BAMMA British Lightweight Title shot.

Warburton received that title shot against Stevie Ray on 9 March 2013 at BAMMA 12. He won the fight via unanimous decision to become the new BAMMA British Lightweight champion.

=== Cage Warriors ===
Warburton made his Cage Warriors debut against Wesley Murch in December 2013. He win the fight in the 1st round via rear naked choke. The fight was a catchweight bout and se Curt on the part to a Lightweight title shot.

Warburton was supposed to fight the Lightweight champion in Jordan but the champion decided to rescind his title and step aside.

Warburton faced Stevie Ray at Cage Warriors 69 on 7 June 2014 on Super Saturday for the vacant Cage Warriors Lightweight Title. He lost the bout via split decision.

=== BAMMA ===
After a break of over three years Warburton returned to action with BAMMA on their return to his native North East. He won the bout against Warren Kee via TKO in the first round.

== Mixed martial arts record ==
Professional record breakdown
20 matches	14 wins	6 losses
By knockout	5	1
By submission	4	3
By decision	5	2

Res.	Record	Opponent	Method	Event	Date	Round	Time	Location	Notes
Win	14–6	Warren Kee	TKO (punches)	BAMMA 33	15 December 2017	1	1:05	Newcastle, England	
Loss	13–6	Stevie Ray	Submission (rear-naked choke)	Cage Warriors 73	1 November 2014	2	2:00	Newcastle, England	For the Cage Warriors Lightweight Championship.
Loss	13–5	Stevie Ray	Decision (split)	Cage Warriors 69	7 June 2014	5	5:00	London, England	For the vacant Cage Warriors Lightweight Championship.
Win	13–4	Wesley Murch	Submission (standing rear-naked choke)	Cage Warriors 62	7 December 2013	1	0:49	Newcastle upon Tyne, England	160 Lbs. Catchweight.
Loss	12–4	Mansour Barnaoui	TKO (punches & elbows)	BAMMA 13: Night of Champions	14 September 2013	1	4:08	Birmingham, England	For the vacant BAMMA World Lightweight Championship.
Win	12–3	Stevie Ray	Decision (unanimous)	BAMMA 12: Walhead vs. Veach	9 March 2013	5	5:00	Newcastle upon Tyne, England	Won the BAMMA British Lightweight Championship.
Win	11–3	Lee Wieczorek	Decision (unanimous)	BAMMA 10: Sinclair vs. Winner	15 September 2012	3	5:00	London, England	
Win	10–3	Declan Larkin	Submission (triangle armbar)	Total Combat 46	10 March 2012	1	1:04	Spennymoor, England	
Win	9–3	Artur Sowiński	Submission (arm-triangle choke)	KSW 18	25 February 2012	2	3:03	Płock, Poland	
Win	8–3	Tim Newman	Decision (unanimous)	BAMMA 8: Manuwa vs. Rea	10 December 2011	3	5:00	Birmingham, England	
Loss	7–3	Joe Lauzon	Submission (triangle kimura)	UFC Live: Kongo vs. Barry	26 June 2011	1	1:58	Pittsburgh, United States	
Win	7–2	Maciej Jewtuszko	Decision (unanimous)	UFC 127	27 February 2011	3	5:00	Sydney, Australia	
Loss	6–2	Spencer Fisher	Decision (unanimous)	UFC 120	16 October 2010	3	5:00	London, England	
Win	6–1	Tom Maguire	Decision (unanimous)	Strike and Submit 12	4 October 2009	3	5:00	Gateshead, England	
Win	5–1	Toon Van Thielen	Submission (guillotine choke)	OMMAC 1 – Assassins	8 August 2009	1	1:34	Liverpool, England	
Loss	4–1	Will Burke	Submission (armbar)	MMA Total Combat 24	31 May 2008	1	1:00	Durham, England	
Win	4–0	Jamie McKenzie	TKO (punches)	MMA Total Combat 23	23 February 2008	1	4:20	Durham, England	
Win	3–0	Ross Pearson	TKO (doctor stoppage)	MMA Total Combat 21	22 September 2007	1	N/A	Durham, England	
Win	2–0	Ian Margerison	TKO (punches)	MMA Total Combat 21	22 September 2007	1	2:43	Durham, England	
Win	1–0	Mark Mills	TKO (punches)	Ultimate Force 5	19 May 2007	1	3:42	Doncaster, England	
