= BAMMA =

Defunct UK-based MMA promotion

- Type: Private
- Industry: Mixed martial arts promotion
- Founded: 2009
- Defunct: 2018
- Headquarters: London, England
- Website: http://www.bamma.com

BAMMA (British Association of Mixed Martial Arts) was a mixed martial arts promotion based in the United Kingdom. It premiered on June 27, 2009, and was shown on the television channel Bravo. BAMMA events were shown live on ITV4 in the UK and Ireland, KIX in Asia (in Indonesia aired on tvOne), VEQTA Digital Broadcast Sports Network in India, Kwesé Sports in Africa, DAZN in Germany & Russia, FITE TV and UNILAD (Online). BAMMA events stream live on the UNILAD Facebook Page (Prelims) and ITV4 (UK) & Fite.tv (US) (Main Card). BAMMA 29 was shown on free to air channel Dave, and BAMMA 30 was also shown there on 7 July 2017 as was BAMMA 31. BAMMA 33 was shown on ITV4 on December 15 2017. The last BAMMA event was held in London on June 28, 2018.

== History ==
BAMMA held its first event in London on June 27, 2009. BAMMA 1: The Fighting Premiership was held in a tournament format, with two semi-finals taking place in the Lightweight, Welterweight and Middleweight divisions. The semi-final winners progressed to the final, which is to take place at a later date. Their next event, BAMMA 2: Roundhouses at the Roundhouse, was held at The Roundhouse and saw BAMMA's first champions crowned. Rob Sinclair defeated Nathan Beer to become the Lightweight Champion, and Alan Omer got the better of Paul Reed for the Featherweight Championship.

After this, BAMMA moved to Birmingham for BAMMA 3: Horwich vs. Watson which hosted three title fights. Originally, tabloid celebrity Alex Reid was set to fight Tom "Kong" Watson for the vacant Middleweight title. However, Reid injured his knee while filming his documentary TV series Alex Reid: The Fight of His Life and was forced to pull out of the fight. This angered Watson, who claimed Reid was disrespecting him. Watson also called him a "clown" and said that it was likely Reid pulled out to avoid an embarrassing defeat. Reid was then replaced by UFC and IFL veteran Matt Horwich for the main event. Watson won the fight by decision and claimed the belt.

In the Featherweight division, Omer lost his belt to Mark Adams via unanimous decision. Also, Daniel Weichel was brought over from Germany to challenge Sinclair's reign as Lightweight Champ. Sinclair, who used the England football anthem "Three Lions" as his entrance music, successfully defended his title by TKOing Weichel in the first round. A number of other big names also filled the card, including Seth Petruzelli and War Machine, and around 5,000 fans were in attendance that night.

At BAMMA 4: Reid vs. Watson, Reid finally got the chance to take on Watson in a championship bout, but "Kong" was able to defend his title by winning via unanimous decision. Also featured on the card that night were three of Europe's most promising welterweights in Eugene Fadiora, Gunnar Nelson and Simeon Thoresen. BAMMA 4: Reid vs. Watson gained a huge TV audience breaking records for Bravo and becoming one of the most watched MMA bouts in UK history. The main event peaked with over 835,000 viewers during the fight, making it the most watched MMA event in UK history.

BAMMA's next event BAMMA 5 was originally planned for December 2010 and was set to be headlined by Bob Sapp vs. Stav Economou. However, due to snowstorms in the UK the event was cancelled. It was rescheduled for February 26, 2011, at the MEN Arena in Manchester with Paul Daley taking on Yuya Shirai for the BAMMA Welterweight title

It was announced on January 27, 2011, that BAMMA had signed a 1-year deal with SyFy to broadcast all 5 of their arena events in 2011, completely live on the channel in the UK. This is an unprecedented deal which makes BAMMA the first ever MMA organisation in the UK to deliver totally live coverage on a non-subscription channel.

BAMMA 6 took place at Wembley Arena on May 21, 2011, and featured a title defence by Tom Watson. It was announced on March 16, 2011, that Tom Watson would face Murilo Rua. Rumours began to circulate that wrestler Dave Batista would make his MMA debut at BAMMA 6. However this was not the case, instead UFC veterans Frank Trigg and Ivan Salaverry took part at the event, posting a win and a loss respectively.

At BAMMA 7, they held their first British title fight, where Welsh Middleweight Jack Marshman became the first British Middleweight Champion.

On November 14, 2011, "Inside MMA", announced that HDNet, the network that shows Inside MMA and promotions such as ProElite's and DREAM's live events has signed an agreement with BAMMA to air their events, beginning with BAMMA 8. A few weeks later BAMMA announced that they signed a 10 event deal with Canada's The Fight Network.

In Brazil, TV Esporte Interativo signed an agreement with BAMMA to air their events in 2012

This MMA organisation will partner Rizin Fighting Federation for the RIZIN FIGHTING WORLD GRAND-PRIX event to be held on December 29 and 31 2015. The former Pride FC Heavyweight champion Fedor Emelianenko will headline the NYE Rizin FF main event.

=== Channel 5 TV deal ===
In a major deal to bring mixed martial arts into the British mainstream, BAMMA announced that they have signed a deal with Channel 5. They held their first event under the deal, BAMMA 10, on their sister channel '5*' with Channel 5 televising a highlights package the following week. The main event saw Rob Sinclair successfully defend his Lightweight title against The Ultimate Fighter: United States vs. United Kingdom finalist and UFC veteran Andre Winner.

BAMMA announced during mid July that they had renewed their deal with Lonsdale.

=== Aaron Chalmers ===
In May of 2017, reality TV star Aaron Chalmers debuted with the promotion, using his popularity from Geordie Shore to bring new fans to the promotion's live and televised events. After going 3-0 with the promotion, BAMMA released Chalmers for a one-fight deal with Bellator MMA on a co-promoted card.

Chalmers spoke out about contract wranglings with the company, before eventually signing for Bellator after a "long-winded process" with the UK promotion.

=== Broadcast Team ===
Name	Role
(United Kingdom) Andy Shepherd	Host
(United Kingdom) David Haye	Host
(Republic of Ireland) Paddy Holohan	Host

=== BAMMA Safety Standards in MMA ===
On October 25, 2012, it was announced that, along with Cage Warriors and Ultimate Challenge MMA, that BAMMA have united with The Centre of Health and Human Performance in London to launched SAFE MMA, a nonprofit organization established to improve the safety of MMA fighters in the U.K. Chief among the organization's plans is a centralized and confidential database for fighter medical records. SAFE MMA, which officially launches Jan. 1 2013, also will provide affordable, standardized blood and medical tests for all registered fighters, as well as advice from leading world experts in sports medicine, according to today's announcement.

In 2016 BAMMA went one step further and introduced new safety standards for its MMA shows, with the inclusion of pre and post fight MRi & MRA scans, making it the most upscaled medical provision for any UK and European MMA promotion

== Rules ==
BAMMA's are based upon the Unified Rules of Mixed Martial Arts that were originally established by the New Jersey State Athletic Control Board and modified by the Nevada State Athletic Commission. These rules have been adopted across the US in other states that regulate mixed martial arts. As a result, they have become the standard de facto set of rules for professional mixed martial arts across the US and for cage-based MMA worldwide.

All BAMMA fights are contested over three, five-minute rounds. There is a one-minute rest period in-between rounds. As per the Unified Rules of MMA, BAMMA only allows competitors to fight in approved shorts, without shoes or any other sort of foot padding. Fighters must use approved light gloves (4-6 ounces) that allow fingers to grab. The referee has the right to stop the fighters and stand them up if they reach a stalemate on the ground (where neither are in a dominant position nor working toward one) after a verbal warning.

=== Match outcome ===
Matches usually end via:

- Submission: a fighter taps on the mat or his opponent three times (or more) or verbally submits.
- Knockout: a fighter falls from a legal blow and is either unconscious or unable to immediately continue.
- Technical Knockout: stoppage of the fight by the referee if it is determined a fighter cannot "intelligently defend" himself or by ringside doctor due to injury.
- Judges' Decision: Depending on scoring, a match may end as:
  - unanimous decision (all three judges score a win for one fighter),
  - split decision (two judges score a win for one fighter with the third for the other),
  - majority decision (two judges score a win for one fighter with one for a draw),
  - unanimous draw (all three judges score a draw),
  - majority draw (two judges score a draw).
  - split draw (the total points for each fighter is equal)

A fight can also end in a technical decision, technical draw, disqualification, forfeit or no contest.

=== Judging criteria ===
The ten-point must system is used for all BAMMA fights; three judges score each round and the winner of each receives ten points, the loser nine points or less. If the round is even, both fighters receive ten points. The decision is announced at the end of the match but the judge's scorecards are not announced.

=== Fouls ===
The following are considered fouls in BAMMA:

1. Butting with the head.
2. Eye gouging of any kind.
3. Biting.
4. Hair pulling.
5. Fish hooking.
6. Groin attacks of any kind.
7. Putting a finger into any orifice or into any cut or laceration on an opponent. (see Gouging)
8. Small joint manipulation.
9. Striking to the spine or the back of the head. (see Rabbit punch)
10. Striking downward using the point of the elbow. (see Elbow (strike))
11. Throat strikes of any kind, including, without limitation, grabbing the trachea.
12. Clawing, pinching or twisting the flesh.
13. Grabbing the clavicle.
14. Kicking the head of a grounded opponent.
15. Kneeing the head of a grounded opponent.
16. Stomping a grounded opponent.
17. Kicking to the kidney with the heel.
18. Spiking an opponent to the canvas on his head or neck. (see piledriver (professional wrestling))
19. Throwing an opponent out of the ring or fenced area.
20. Holding the shorts or gloves of an opponent.
21. Spitting at an opponent.
22. Engaging in an unsportsmanlike conduct that causes an injury to an opponent.
23. Holding the ropes or the fence.
24. Using abusive language in the ring or fenced area.
25. Attacking an opponent on or during the break.
26. Attacking an opponent who is under the care of the referee.
27. Attacking an opponent after the bell has sounded the end of the period of unarmed combat.
28. Flagrantly disregarding the instructions of the referee.
29. Timidity, including, without limitation, avoiding contact with an opponent, intentionally or consistently dropping the mouthpiece or faking an injury.
30. Interference by the corner.
31. Throwing in the towel during competition.

When a foul is charged, the referee in their discretion may deduct one or more points as a penalty. If a foul incapacitates a fighter, then the match may end in a disqualification if the foul was intentional, or a no contest if unintentional. If a foul causes a fighter to be unable to continue later in the bout, it ends with a technical decision win to the injured fighter if the injured fighter is ahead on points, otherwise it is a technical draw.

== Final Champions ==
=== BAMMA Champions ===
Division	Upper weight limit	Champion	Since	Title Defenses
Heavyweight	265 lb (120 kg; 18.9 st)	(England) Brett McDermott	BAMMA 29	0
Light Heavyweight	205 lb (93 kg; 14.6 st)	Vacant		
Middleweight	185 lb (84 kg; 13.2 st)	Vacant		
Welterweight	170 lb (77 kg; 12 st)	(England) Terry Brazier	BAMMA 34	0
Lightweight	155 lb (70 kg; 11.1 st)	(England) Terry Brazier	BAMMA 36	0
Featherweight	145 lb (66 kg; 10.4 st)	Vacant		
Bantamweight	135 lb (61 kg; 9.6 st)	Vacant		
Flyweight	125 lb (57 kg; 8.9 st)	(Spain) Daniel Barez	BAMMA 32	0

=== RDX Champions ===
Division	Upper weight limit	Champion	Since	Title Defenses
Heavyweight	265 lb (120 kg; 18.9 st)	Vacant		
Light Heavyweight	205 lb (93 kg; 14.6 st)	Vacant		
Middleweight	185 lb (84 kg; 13.2 st)	(United Kingdom) Andy De Vent	BAMMA 19	0
Welterweight	170 lb (77 kg; 12 st)	(England) Terry Brazier	BAMMA 29	0
Lightweight	155 lb (70 kg; 11.1 st)	(England) Tim Barnett	BAMMA 34	1
Featherweight	145 lb (66 kg; 10.4 st)	Vacant		
Bantamweight	135 lb (61 kg; 9.6 st)	(Northern Ireland) Alan Philpott	BAMMA 24	1
Flyweight	125 lb (57 kg; 8.9 st)	(Spain) Daniel Barez	BAMMA 30	0

== World Title history ==
=== BAMMA World Heavyweight Championship ===
206 to 265 lbs (93 to 120 kg)

No.	Name	Event	Date	Defenses
1	(England) Mark Godbeer def. Paul Taylor	BAMMA 21; West Midlands, United Kingdom	June 13, 2015	1. def. RDX champion Stuart Austin at BAMMA 25 on May 14, 2016
Godbeer vacated the title when he signed with the UFC in 2016.
2	(England) Brett McDermott def. Ruben Wolf	BAMMA 29; Birmingham, United Kingdom	May 12, 2017	

=== BAMMA World Light Heavyweight Championship ===
186 to 205 lbs (84 to 93 kg)

No.	Name	Event	Date	Defenses
1	(Netherlands) Jason Jones def. Max Nunes	BAMMA 13; Birmingham, United Kingdom	September 14, 2013	
Jones vacated the title when he signed with UAE Warriors in 2015.
2	(Poland) Marcin Lazarz def. Brett McDermott	BAMMA 20; West Midlands, United Kingdom	April 25, 2015	
3	(Scotland) Paul Craig	BAMMA 23; Birmingham, United Kingdom	November 14, 2015	
Craig vacated the title when he signed with the UFC in 2016.

=== BAMMA World Middleweight Championship ===
171 to 185 lbs (77 to 84 kg)

No.	Name	Event	Date	Defenses
1	(England) Tom Watson def. Matt Horwich	BAMMA 3 Birmingham, United Kingdom	May 15, 2010	1. def. Alex Reid at BAMMA 4 on September 25, 2010; 2. def. Murilo Rua at BAMMA 6 on May 21, 2011; 3. def. RDX champion Jack Marshman at BAMMA 9 on Mar 24, 2012
Watson vacated the title when he left BAMMA for the UFC.
2	(England) Scott Askham def. Jorge Luis Bezerra	BAMMA 13; Birmingham, United Kingdom	September 14, 2013	1. def. Max Nunes at BAMMA Fight Night: Southampton on June 7, 2014
Askham vactated the title when he left BAMMA for the UFC.
3	(France) Cheick Kone def. Andy DeVent	BAMMA 21; West Midlands, United Kingdom	June 13, 2015	
4	(Wales) John Phillips	BAMMA 24; Dublin, Ireland	February 27, 2016	
Phillips stripped of the title when he missed weight (by 13.2lbs) at BAMMA 26.
5	(England) Yannick Bahati def. Matt Hallam	BAMMA 29; Birmingham, United Kingdom	May 12, 2017	
6	(England) Mike Shipman	BAMMA 31; London, United Kingdom	September 15, 2017	
Shipman vacated the title when he left BAMMA for Bellator MMA.

=== BAMMA World Welterweight Championship ===
156 to 170 lbs

No.	Name	Event	Date	Defenses
1	(United States) Eddy Ellis def. Jim Wallhead	BAMMA 13; Birmingham, United Kingdom	September 14, 2013	
Ellis vactated the title when his contract with BAMMA expired.
2	(France) Alex Lohore def. Nathan Jones	BAMMA 31; London, United Kingdom	September 15, 2017	1. def. Richard Kiely at BAMMA 32 on November 10, 2017
3	(England) Terry Brazier	BAMMA 34; London, United Kingdom	March 9, 2018	

=== BAMMA World Lightweight Championship ===
146 to 155 lbs (66 to 70 kg)

No.	Name	Event	Date	Defenses
1	(England) Rob Sinclair def. Nathan Beer	BAMMA 2 London, England	February 13, 2010	1. def. Daniel Weichel at BAMMA 3 on May 15, 2010; 2. def. Diego Vital at BAMMA 7 on Sep 10, 2011; 3. def. Andre Winner at BAMMA 10 on Sep 15, 2012
Sinclair vacated the title when he left BAMMA for Bellator MMA.
2	(France) Mansour Barnaoui def. Curt Warburton	BAMMA 13; Birmingham, United Kingdom	September 14, 2013	1. def. Colin Fletcher at BAMMA 14 on December 14, 2013
Barnaoui was released from the promotion when he signed with M-1 Global on September 10, 2015.
3	(England) Martin Stapleton def. Gavin Sterritt	BAMMA 23; Birmingham, United Kingdom	November 14, 2015	1. def. Damien Lapilus at BAMMA 25 on May 14, 2016
Stapleton vacated the title when he left BAMMA for Cage Warriors.
4	(England) Ryan Scope def. Mickael Lebout	BAMMA 33; Newcastle, United Kingdom	December 15, 2017	
Scope vacated the title when he left BAMMA for Bellator MMA.
5	(Northern Ireland) Rhys McKee def. Tim Barnett	BAMMA 34; London, United Kingdom	March 9, 2018	
6	(England) Terry Brazier	BAMMA 36; London, United Kingdom	June 28, 2018	

=== BAMMA World Featherweight Championship ===
136 to 145 lbs (61 to 66 kg)

No.	Name	Event	Date	Defenses
1	(Germany) Alan Omer def. Paul Reed	BAMMA 2 London, United Kingdom	February 13, 2010	
2	(England) Mark Adams	BAMMA 3 Birmingham, United Kingdom	May 15, 2010	
Adams was stripped of the title due to inactivity.
3	(France) Tom Duquesnoy def. Teddy Violet	BAMMA 15; London, England	April 5, 2014	1. No contest vs. Ashleigh Grimshaw at BAMMA 16 on September 14, 2014; 2. def. Krzysztof Klaczek at BAMMA 18 on February 21, 2015; 3. def. Brendan Loughnane at BAMMA 22 on September 19, 2015
Duquesnoy vacated the title when he signed with the UFC in 2017.
4	(France) Damien Lapilus def. Ronnie Mann	BAMMA 28; Belfast, Northern Ireland	February 24, 2017	
5	(England) Daniel Crawford	BAMMA 31; London, England	September 15, 2017	
Crawford vacated the title when he left BAMMA for Bellator MMA.

=== BAMMA World Bantamweight Championship ===
126 to 135 lbs (58 to 60 kg)

No.	Name	Event	Date	Defenses
1	(England) Ed Arthur def. Alan Philpott	BAMMA 20; West Midlands, United Kingdom	April 25, 2015	
2	(England) Shay Walsh	BAMMA 23; Birmingham, United Kingdom	November 14, 2015	
3	(France) Tom Duquesnoy	BAMMA 25; Birmingham, United Kingdom	May 14, 2016	1. def. Alan Philpott at BAMMA 27 on December 16, 2016.
Duquesnoy vacated the title when he signed with the UFC in 2017.

=== BAMMA World Flyweight Championship ===
116 to 125 lbs (53 to 57 kg)

No.	Name	Event	Date	Defenses
1	(Germany) Rany Saadeh def. Jody Collins	BAMMA Fight Night: Liverpool; Liverpool, United Kingdom	August 2, 2014	1. def. Shaj Haque at BAMMA 23 on November 14, 2015.; 2. def. Andy Young at BAMMA 26 on September 10, 2016
Saadeh vacated the title when his contract with BAMMA expired.
-	(Northern Ireland) Andy Young def. Dominique Wooding for interim title	BAMMA 28; Belfast, Northern Ireland	February 24, 2017	
2	(Spain) Daniel Barez def. interim champion Andy Young	BAMMA 32; Dublin, Ireland	November 10, 2017	

== British Title history ==
=== BAMMA British Heavyweight Championship ===
206 to 265 lb (93 to 120) kg

No.	Name	Event	Date	Defenses
1	(United Kingdom) Stuart Austin def. Thomas Denham	BAMMA 23; Birmingham, United Kingdom	November 14, 2015	
2	(United Kingdom) Mark Godbeer	BAMMA 25; Birmingham, United Kingdom	May 14, 2016	
Godbeer vacated the title when he signed with the UFC in 2016.

=== BAMMA British Middleweight Championship ===
171 to 185 lbs (77 to 84 kg)

No.	Name	Event	Date	Defenses
1	(Wales) Jack Marshman def. Carl Noon	BAMMA 7 Birmingham, United Kingdom	September 10, 2011	1. def. Leeroy Barnes at BAMMA 8 on Dec 10, 2011
Marshman was stripped of the title on September 14, 2012 when he failed to make weight for his BAMMA 10 title defense.
2	(United Kingdom) Harry McLeman def. Andy De Vent	BAMMA 15; London, United Kingdom	April 5, 2014	
McLeman vacated the title after being released
3	(United Kingdom) Andy De Vent def. Conor Cooke	BAMMA 19; Blackpool, United Kingdom	March 28, 2015	

=== BAMMA British Welterweight Championship ===
156 to 170 lbs (71 to 77 kg)

No.	Name	Event	Date	Defenses
1	(United Kingdom) Tom Breese def. Warren Kee	BAMMA 11; Birmingham, United Kingdom	December 1, 2012	
Breese vacated the title when he left BAMMA.
2	(United Kingdom) Wayne Murrie def. Michael Johnson	BAMMA 14; Birmingham, United Kingdom	December 14, 2013	
3	(United Kingdom) Leon Edwards	BAMMA 15; London, United Kingdom	April 5, 2014	1. def. Shaun Taylor at BAMMA 16 on Sep 14, 2014
Edwards vacated the title when he left BAMMA for UFC.
4	(United Kingdom) Terry Brazier def. Walter Gahadza	BAMMA 29; Birmingham, United Kingdom	May 12, 2017	

=== BAMMA British Lightweight Championship ===
146 to 155 lbs (66 to 70 kg)

No.	Name	Event	Date	Defenses
1	(Scotland) Stevie Ray def. Dale Hardiman	BAMMA 11; Birmingham, England	December 1, 2012	
2	(United Kingdom) Curt Warburton	BAMMA 12; Tyne and Wear, England	March 9, 2013	
Warburton vacated the title when he challenged for the BAMMA World Lightweight title.
3	(United Kingdom) Marc Diakiese def. Jack McGann	BAMMA 19; Blackpool, England	March 28, 2015	1. def. Rick Selvarajah at BAMMA 22 on Sep 19, 2015; 2. def. Kane Mousah at BAMMA 25 on May 14, 2016
Diakiese vacated the title when he signed with the UFC in 2016.
4	(Northern Ireland) Rhys McKee def. Jai Herbert	BAMMA 27; Dublin, Ireland	December 16, 2016	
5	(England) Tim Barnett	BAMMA 28; Belfast, Northern Ireland	February 24, 2017	1. def. Mario Saeed at BAMMA 29 on May 12, 2017

=== BAMMA British Bantamweight Championship ===
126 to 135 lbs (58 to 60 kg)

No.	Name	Event	Date	Defenses
1	(Northern Ireland) Alan Philpott def. Nathaniel Wood	BAMMA 24; Dublin, Ireland	February 27, 2016	1. def. Aaron Blackwell at BAMMA 26 on Sep 10, 2016

=== BAMMA British Flyweight Championship ===
up to 125 lbs (58 kg)

No.	Name	Event	Date	Defenses
1	(Spain) Daniel Barez def. Ryan Curtis	BAMMA 30; Dublin, Ireland	July 7, 2017	

== Events ==
#	Event title	Date	Arena	Location	Broadcast
38	BAMMA 36: McKee vs. Brazier	June 28, 2018	York Hall	London, England	ITV 4
37	BAMMA 35: Lohore vs. Pascu	May 12, 2018	3Arena	Dublin, Ireland	ITV 4
36	BAMMA 34: Lohore vs. Brazier	March 9, 2018	SSE Arena	London, England	ITV 4
35	BAMMA 33: Scope vs. Lebout	December 15, 2017	Metro Radio Arena	Newcastle, England	ITV 4
34	BAMMA 32: Lohore vs. Kiely	November 10, 2017	3Arena	Dublin, Ireland	Dave
33	BAMMA 31: Jones vs. Lohore	September 15, 2017	SSE Arena	London, England	Dave
32	BAMMA 30: Philpott vs. Walsh	July 7, 2017	3Arena	Dublin, Ireland	Dave
31	BAMMA 29: McDermott vs. Wolf	May 12, 2017	Genting Arena	Birmingham, England	Dave
30	BAMMA 28: Parke vs. Redmond	February 24, 2017	SSE Arena Belfast	Belfast, Northern Ireland	
29	BAMMA 27: Duquesnoy vs. Philpott	December 16, 2016	3Arena	Dublin, Ireland	
28	BAMMA 26: Saadeh vs. Young	September 10, 2016	3Arena	Dublin, Ireland	Spike (UK) & Channel 5
27	BAMMA 25: Champion vs. Champion	May 14, 2016	Barclaycard Arena	Birmingham, England	Spike (UK) & Channel 5
26	BAMMA 24: Ireland vs. England	February 27, 2016	3Arena	Dublin, Ireland	Spike (UK) & Channel 5
25	BAMMA 23: Night of Champions	November 14, 2015	Barclaycard Arena	Birmingham, England	Spike (UK) & Channel 5
24	BAMMA 22: Duquesnoy vs. Loughnane	September 19, 2015	3Arena	Dublin, Ireland	Spike (UK) & Channel 5
23	BAMMA 21: DeVent vs. Kone	June 13, 2015	Barclaycard Arena	Birmingham, England	Spike (UK) & Channel 5
22	BAMMA 20: McDermott vs. Lazarz	April 25, 2015	Barclaycard Arena	Birmingham, England	Spike (UK) & Channel 5
21	BAMMA 19: Stapleton vs. Petley	March 28, 2015	Winter Gardens Arena	Blackpool, England	AMC Networks
20	BAMMA 18: Duquesnoy vs. Klaczek	February 21, 2015	Wolverhampton Civic Hall	Wolverhampton, England	AMC Networks
19	BAMMA 17: Fletcher vs. Brightmon	December 6, 2014	Victoria Warehouse	Manchester, England	AMC Networks
18	BAMMA 16: Daley vs. da Rocha	September 13, 2014	Victoria Warehouse	Manchester, England	AMC Networks
17	BAMMA Fight Night: Liverpool	August 2, 2014	Liverpool Olympia	Liverpool, England	AMC Networks
16	BAMMA Fight Night: Southampton	June 7, 2014	O2 Guildhall	Southampton, England	AMC Networks
15	BAMMA 15: Thompson vs. Selmani	April 5, 2014	Copper Box Arena	London, England	5*, Channel 5
14	BAMMA 14: Daley vs. da Silva	December 14, 2013	LG Arena	Birmingham, England	5*, Channel 5
13	BAMMA 13: Night of Champions	September 14, 2013	National Indoor Arena	Birmingham, England	5*, Channel 5
12	BAMMA 12: Wallhead vs. Veach	March 9, 2013	Metro Radio Arena	Newcastle upon Tyne, England	5*, Channel 5
11	BAMMA 11: Marshman vs. Foupa-Pokam	December 1, 2012	National Indoor Arena	Birmingham, England	5*, Channel 5
10	BAMMA 10: Sinclair vs. Winner	September 15, 2012	Wembley Arena	London, England	5*, Channel 5
9	BAMMA 9: Watson vs. Marshman	March 24, 2012	National Indoor Arena	Birmingham, England	Extreme Sports Channel
8	BAMMA 8: Manuwa vs. Rea	December 10, 2011	Capital FM Arena	Nottingham, England	Syfy
7	BAMMA 7: Trigg vs. Wallhead	September 10, 2011	National Indoor Arena	Birmingham, England	Syfy
6	BAMMA 6: Watson vs. Rua	May 21, 2011	Wembley Arena	London, England	Syfy
5	BAMMA 5: Daley vs. Shirai	February 26, 2011	MEN Arena	Manchester, England	Syfy
4	BAMMA 4: Reid vs. Watson	September 25, 2010	National Indoor Arena	Birmingham, England	Bravo
3	BAMMA 3: Horwich vs. Watson	May 15, 2010	LG Arena	Birmingham, England	Bravo
2	BAMMA 2: Roundhouses at the Roundhouse	February 13, 2010	The Roundhouse	London, England	Bravo
1	BAMMA 1: The Fighting Premiership	June 27, 2009	Room by the River	London, England	Bravo
