= 2011 in BAMMA =

UK mixed martial arts events

Information
- First date: February 26, 2011
- Last date: December 10, 2011

Events
- Total events: 4

Fights
- Total fights: 49
- Title fights: 4

Chronology
2010 in BAMMA	2011 in BAMMA	2012 in BAMMA

The year 2011 is the third year in the history of BAMMA, a mixed martial arts promotion based in the United Kingdom. In 2011 BAMMA held 4 events beginning with, BAMMA 5: Daley vs. Shirai.

== Title fights ==
Title fights in 2011
Weight class				Method	Round	Time	Event	Notes
Middleweight	Tom Watson (c)	def.	Murilo Rua	KO (Head Kick and Punches)	3	2:06	BAMMA 6: Watson vs. Rua	(Note: For the BAMMA World Middleweight Championship.)
Middleweight	Jack Marshman (c)	def.	Leeroy Barnes	Decision (Unanimous)	3	5:00	BAMMA 8: Manuwa vs. Rea	(Note: For the BAMMA Lonsdale Middleweight Championship.)
Lightweight	Rob Sinclair (c)	def.	Diego Vital	KO (Punch)	3	3:00	BAMMA 7: Trigg vs. Wallhead	(Note: For the BAMMA Lightweight Championship.)
Middleweight	Jack Marshman	def.	Carl Noon	TKO (Punches)	3	2:09	BAMMA 7: Trigg vs. Wallhead	(Note: For the BAMMA Lonsdale Middleweight Championship.)

== Events list ==
#	Event title	Date	Arena	Location	Broadcast
8	BAMMA 8: Manuwa vs. Rea	December 10, 2011	Capital FM Arena	Nottingham, England, United Kingdom	Syfy
7	BAMMA 7: Trigg vs. Wallhead	September 10, 2011	National Indoor Arena	Birmingham, England, United Kingdom	Syfy
6	BAMMA 6: Watson vs. Rua	May 21, 2011	Wembley Arena	London, England, United Kingdom	Syfy
5	BAMMA 5: Daley vs. Shirai	February 26, 2011	MEN Arena	Manchester, England, United Kingdom	Syfy

== BAMMA 5: Daley vs. Shirai ==
BAMMA 5: Daley vs. Shirai was an event held on February 26, 2011 at MEN Arena in Manchester, England, United Kingdom.

=== Results ===
Main Card
Weight class				Method	Round	Time	Notes
Welterweight	Paul Daley	def.	Yuya Shirai	KO (Punches)	1	1:46
Catchweight	Ricco Rodriguez	def.	James McSweeney	Decision (Unanimous)	3	5:00
Middleweight	Alex Makhonin	def.	Xavier Foupa-Pokam	TKO (Punches and Elbows)	2	4:48
Middleweight	Claudio Henrique da Silva	def.	Jean-Francois Lenogue	Submission (Rear-Naked Choke)	1	2:51
Preliminary Card
Welterweight	Mohsen Bahari	def.	Leeroy Barnes	TKO (Punches)	1	0:40
Welterweight	Leigh Cohoon	def.	Rob Mills	TKO (Punches)	2	4:16
Lightweight	Jason Ball	def.	Peter Duncan	KO (Knees)	2	2:00
Welterweight	Michael Johnson	def.	Paul Cook	Decision (Unanimous)	3	5:00
Lightweight	Tim Newman	def.	Diego Vital	Decision (Split)	3	5:00
Lightweight	Costas Doru	def.	Liam James	Submission (Rear-Naked Choke)	1	2:47
Lightweight	Jeremy Petley	def.	Frankie Slater	Submission (Armbar)	1	0:36

== BAMMA 6: Watson vs. Rua ==
BAMMA 6: Watson vs. Rua was an event held on May 21, 2011 at Wembley Arena in London, England, United Kingdom.

=== Results ===
Main Card
Weight class				Method	Round	Time	Notes
Middleweight	Tom Watson (c)	def.	Murilo Rua	KO (Head Kick and Punches)	3	2:06	(Note: For the BAMMA World Middleweight Championship.)
Middleweight	Frank Trigg	def.	John Phillips	TKO (Doctor Stoppage)	1	2:41
Middleweight	Matt Ewin	def.	Ivan Salaverry	Decision (Unanimous)	3	5:00
Preliminary Card
Middleweight	Valentino Petrescu	def.	Joao Paulo de Souza	Decision (Majority)	3	5:00
Lightweight	Leonardo Santos	def.	Jason Ball	Decision (Unanimous)	3	5:00
Welterweight	Che Mills	def.	Marcio Cesar	KO (Punches)	1	3:58
Lightweight	Scott Jansen	def.	Craig Chesters	TKO (Punches)	2	0:50
Heavyweight	Catalin Zmarandescu	def.	Sharif Mohammed Ali	Submission (Front Choke)	1	0:32
Lightweight	Shane Omer	def.	Aaron Wilkinson	KO (Punches)	1	1:32
Welterweight	Sam Watling	def.	Leigh Cohoon	Decision (Unanimous)	3	5:00
Lightweight	Jeremy Petley	vs.	Costas Doru	Draw	3	5:00
Welterweight	Lee Taylor	def.	Kenny Moyston	TKO (Punches)	2	3:02
Light Heavyweight	Ryan White	def.	Fraser Opie	Submission (Guillotine Choke)	1	1:39
Welterweight	Murrey Fullerton	def.	Charles Scott	Submission (Armbar)	1	2:25

== BAMMA 7: Trigg vs. Wallhead ==
BAMMA 7: Trigg vs. Wallhead was an event held on September 10, 2011 at National Indoor Arena in Birmingham, England, United Kingdom.

=== Results ===
Main Card
Weight class				Method	Round	Time	Notes
Middleweight	Jim Wallhead	def.	Frank Trigg	Decision (Split)	3	5:00
Catchweight (176 lb)	Paul Daley	def.	Jordan Radev	Decision (Unanimous)	3	5:00
Middleweight	Jack Marshman	def.	Carl Noon	TKO (Punches)	3	2:09	(Note: For the BAMMA Lonsdale Middleweight Championship.)
Lightweight	Andre Winner	def.	Jason Ball	Decision (Unanimous)	3	5:00
Lightweight	Rob Sinclair (c)	def.	Diego Vital	KO (Punch)	3	3:00	(Note: For the BAMMA Lightweight Championship.)
Preliminary Card
Lightweight	Dale Hardiman	def.	Scott Jansen	Submission (Rear-Naked Choke)	2	1:16
Lightweight	Chris Fishgold	def.	Jeremy Petley	Submission (Rear-Naked Choke)	1	4:33
Lightweight	Pindi Madahar	def.	Danny Compton	TKO (Punches)	2	1:06
Welterweight	Eugene Fadiora	def.	Robert Devane	Submission (Rear-Naked Choke)	1	4:55
Welterweight	Tom Breese	def.	Lee Taylor	Submission (Rear-Naked Choke)	1	2:26
Welterweight	Dean Amasinger	def.	Shahid Hussain	Decision (Unanimous)	3	5:00
Light Heavyweight	Fraser Opie	def.	Robert Krecicki	TKO (Punches)	1	3:19
Bantamweight	Erik Pérez	def.	James Brum	Technical Submission (Rear-Naked Choke)	1	3:31

== BAMMA 8: Manuwa vs. Rea ==
BAMMA 8: Manuwa vs. Rea was an event held on December 10, 2011 at Capital FM Arena in Nottingham, England, United Kingdom.

=== Results ===
Main Card
Weight class				Method	Round	Time	Notes
Light Heavyweight	Jimi Manuwa	def.	Antony Rea	TKO (Retirement)	1	5:00
Welterweight	Jim Wallhead	def.	Joey Villasenor	KO (Punches)	1	0:48
Lightweight	Andre Winner	def.	Diego Gonzalez	Decision (Unanimous)	3	5:00
Bantamweight	Erik Pérez	def.	Paul McVeigh	Decision (Unanimous)	3	5:00
Preliminary Card
Middleweight	Jack Marshman (c)	def.	Leeroy Barnes	Decision (Unanimous)	3	5:00	(Note: For the BAMMA Lonsdale Middleweight Championship.)
Lightweight	Curt Warburton	def.	Tim Newman	Decision (Unanimous)	3	5:00
Lightweight	Colin Fletcher	def.	David Round	Submission (Guillotine Choke)	1	2:13
Welterweight	Tom Breese	def.	Qasim Shafiq	Submission (Triangle Choke)	1	4:20
Welterweight	Danny Mitchell	def.	Dean Amasinger	Submission (Flying Triangle Choke)	2	2:28
Bantamweight	Brent Crawley	def.	Mark Platts	Submission (Rear-Naked Choke)	1	2:57
Flyweight	Brian Hyslop	def.	Ian Malone	Decision (Unanimous)	3	5:00
