= 2009 in BAMMA =

UK mixed martial arts events

Information
- First date: June 27, 2009
- Last date: June 27, 2009

Events
- Total events: 1

Fights
- Total fights: 9

Chronology
2009 in BAMMA	2010 in BAMMA

The year 2009 is the first year in the history of BAMMA, a mixed martial arts promotion based in the United Kingdom. In 2009 BAMMA held 1 event, BAMMA 1: The Fighting Premiership.

== Events list ==
#	Event Title	Date	Arena	Location	Broadcast
1	BAMMA 1: The Fighting Premiership	June 27, 2009	Room by the River	London, England, United Kingdom	Bravo

== BAMMA 1: The Fighting Premiership ==
BAMMA 1: The Fighting Premiership was an event held on June 27, 2009 at the Room by the River in London, England, United Kingdom.

=== Results ===
Main Card
Weight class				Method	Round	Time	Notes
Middleweight	Tom Watson	def.	John Maguire	TKO (Punches)	3	2:47
Middleweight	Denniston Sutherland	def.	John Phillips	Submission (Punches)	1	3:22
Welterweight	Che Mills	def.	Edgelson Lua	Decision (Unanimous)	3	5:00
Welterweight	Eugene Fadiora	def.	Nathan Champ	Decision (Unanimous)	3	5:00
Lightweight	Tim Radcliffe	def.	Abdul Mohamed	Decision (Unanimous)	3	5:00
Lightweight	Francis Heagney	def.	Zack Jones	TKO (Punches)	1	3:08
Preliminary Card
Middleweight	Adam Stanton	def.	Dan Movahedi	Submission (Arm-Triangle Choke)	1	1:08
Middleweight	Kes Kpokogri	def.	Ben Craggy	Decision (Unanimous)	3	5:00
Lightweight	Radoslaw Piechnik	def.	Spe McMorris	TKO (Punches)	1	1:57
