= 2010 in BAMMA =

UK mixed martial arts events

Information
- First date: February 13, 2010
- Last date: September 25, 2010

Events
- Total events: 3

Fights
- Total fights: 30
- Title fights: 6

Chronology
2009 in BAMMA	2010 in BAMMA	2011 in BAMMA

The year 2010 is the second year in the history of BAMMA, a mixed martial arts promotion based in the United Kingdom. In 2010 BAMMA held 3 events beginning with, BAMMA 2: Roundhouses at the Roundhouse.

== Title fights ==
Title fights in 2010
Weight class				Method	Round	Time	Event	Notes
Featherweight	Alan Omer	def.	Paul Reed	Submission (Triangle Choke)	4	2:10	BAMMA 2: Roundhouses at the Roundhouse	(Note: For the BAMMA Featherweight Championship.)
Lightweight	Rob Sinclair	def.	Nathan Beer	TKO (Punches)	1	3:42	BAMMA 2: Roundhouses at the Roundhouse	(Note: For the BAMMA Lightweight Championship.)
Middleweight	Tom Watson	def.	Matt Horwich	Decision (Unanimous)	5	5:00	BAMMA 3: Horwich vs. Watson	(Note: For the BAMMA World Middleweight Championship.)
Lightweight	Rob Sinclair (c)	def.	Daniel Weichel	TKO (Punches)	1	4:03	BAMMA 3: Horwich vs. Watson	(Note: For the BAMMA Lightweight Championship.)
Featherweight	Mark Adams	def.	Alan Omer (c)	Decision (Unanimous)	5	5:00	BAMMA 3: Horwich vs. Watson	(Note: For the BAMMA Featherweight Championship.)
Middleweight	Tom Watson (c)	def.	Alex Reid	Decision (Unanimous)	5	5:00	BAMMA 4: Reid vs. Watson	(Note: For the BAMMA World Middleweight Championship.)

== Events list ==
#	Event Title	Date	Arena	Location	Broadcast
4	BAMMA 4: Reid vs. Watson	September 25, 2010	National Indoor Arena	Birmingham, England, United Kingdom	Bravo
3	BAMMA 3: Horwich vs. Watson	May 15, 2010	LG Arena	Birmingham, England, United Kingdom	Bravo
2	BAMMA 2: Roundhouses at the Roundhouse	February 13, 2010	The Roundhouse	London, England, United Kingdom	Bravo

== BAMMA 2: Roundhouses at the Roundhouse ==
BAMMA 2: Roundhouses at the Roundhouse was an event held on February 13, 2010, at The Roundhouse in London, England, United Kingdom.

=== Results ===
Main Card
Weight class				Method	Round	Time	Notes
Featherweight	Alan Omer	def.	Paul Reed	Submission (Triangle Choke)	4	2:10	(Note: For the BAMMA Featherweight Championship.)
Welterweight	Gunnar Nelson	def.	Sam Elsdon	Submission (Rear-Naked Choke)	1	2:30
Lightweight	Rob Sinclair	def.	Nathan Beer	TKO (Punches)	1	3:42	(Note: For the BAMMA Lightweight Championship.)
Middleweight	Mike Ling	def.	Russell Smith	Submission (Rear-Naked Choke)	1	4:47
Lightweight	Ali Maclean	vs.	A.J. Wenn	Draw	3	5:00
Preliminary Card
Featherweight	Phil Harris	def.	Steve McCombe	Decision (Unanimous)	3	5:00
Lightweight	Peter Duncan	def.	Alexandre Izidro	Decision (Unanimous)	3	5:00
Welterweight	Stuart Rickman	def.	Nathan Champ	Submission (Rear-Naked Choke)	1	0:00
Welterweight	Charlie Leary	def.	Panayiotis Tsimonos	TKO (Punches)	2	0:00

== BAMMA 3: Horwich vs. Watson ==
BAMMA 3: Horwich vs. Watson was an event held on May 15, 2010, at the LG Arena in Birmingham, England, United Kingdom.

=== Results ===
Main Card
Weight class				Method	Round	Time	Notes
Middleweight	Tom Watson	def.	Matt Horwich	Decision (Unanimous)	5	5:00	(Note: For the BAMMA World Middleweight Championship.)
Light Heavyweight	Seth Petruzelli	def.	Ryan White	Submission (Armbar)	1	1:07
Lightweight	Rob Sinclair (c)	def.	Daniel Weichel	TKO (Punches)	1	4:03	(Note: For the BAMMA Lightweight Championship.)
Welterweight	War Machine	def.	Zach Light	Submission (Rear-Naked Choke)	1	1:09
Featherweight	Mark Adams	def.	Alan Omer (c)	Decision (Unanimous)	5	5:00	(Note: For the BAMMA Featherweight Championship.)
Preliminary Card
Welterweight	Simeon Thoresen	def.	John Maguire	Decision (Unanimous)	3	5:00
Middleweight	Carl Noon	def.	Mike Ling	Submission (Rear-Naked Choke)	1	3:48
Featherweight	Jeff Lawson	def.	David Lee	Submission (Armbar)	1	0:57
Featherweight	Ashleigh Grimshaw	def.	Paul Reed	TKO (Punches)	2	1:04
Featherweight	Phil Harris	def.	Neil Seery	Decision (Unanimous)	3	5:00
Featherweight	Martin McDonough	def.	Mike Wood	Submission (Triangle Choke)	1	3:52

== BAMMA 4: Reid vs. Watson ==
BAMMA 4: Reid vs. Watson was an event held on September 25, 2010, at the National Indoor Arena in Birmingham, England, United Kingdom.

=== Results ===
Main Card
Weight class				Method	Round	Time	Notes
Middleweight	Tom Watson (c)	def.	Alex Reid	Decision (Unanimous)	5	5:00	(Note: For the BAMMA World Middleweight Championship.)
Catchweight (187 lbs)	John Phillips	def.	James Zikic	TKO (Punches)	1	1:34
Welterweight	Gunnar Nelson	def.	Eugene Fadiora	Submission (Rear-Naked Choke)	1	3:51
Welterweight	Simeon Thoresen	def.	Marco Santi	Submission (Rear-Naked Choke)	1	3:59
Lightweight	A.J. Wenn	def.	Tim Newman	Submission (Triangle Choke)	2	1:21
Preliminary Card
Lightweight	Stuart Davies	def.	Scott Jansen	Submission (Armbar)	1	2:31
Lightweight	Harvey Harra	def.	David Round	Submission (Guillotine Choke)	2	1:18
Welterweight	Charlie Leary	def.	Sam Elsdon	TKO (Punches)	1	2:19
Welterweight	Tom Breese	def.	Shahid Hussain	Submission (Rear-Naked Choke)	2	2:57
Middleweight	Robert Devane	def.	Colin Lewis	Submission (Guillotine Choke)	1	1:02
