= Brett McDermott =

Ireland international rugby league footballer & mixed martial arts fighter

- Born: 10 September 1978 (age 48); Cumbria, England
- Other names: The Spartan
- Nationality: English
- Height: 5 ft 11 in (1.80 m)
- Weight: 217.6 lb (15 st 8 lb; 99 kg)
- Division: Light Heavyweight; Heavyweight
- Fighting out of: Barrow-in-Furness, Cumbria, England
- Team: Flex MMA
- Years active: 2013–present

Mixed martial arts record
- Total: 14
- Wins: 9
- By knockout: 8
- By decision: 1
- Losses: 5
- By knockout: 2
- By submission: 2
- By decision: 1

Other information
- Mixed martial arts record from Sherdog
- Rugby league career

Playing information
Club
Years	Team	Pld	T	G	FG	P
1996–01	Barrow	67	16	0	0	64
2002–03	Workington Town	42	14	0	0	56
2004–05	Whitehaven	40	5	0	0	20
2006–11	Barrow	128	22	0	0	88
	Total	277	57	0	0	228
Representative
Years	Team	Pld	T	G	FG	P
2003–07	Cumbria	3	1	0	0	4
2009–10	Ireland	4	0	0	0	0
- Source: As of 12 November 2023

Brett McDermott (born 10 September 1978) is an English mixed martial artist, and former professional rugby league footballer. In rugby he represented Ireland, and played club level for every Cumbrian clubs except Carlisle Border Raiders. In MMA, he has been a professional competitor since 2013 and is the current BAMMA Heavyweight Champion. McDermott also competed for Rizin and Bellator MMA.

== Rugby league ==
McDermott, who competed in professional rugby for 15 seasons, was playing for Barrow in 2009. He also represented Ireland, including games against France in 2010.

On 30 March 2011, McDermott announced his retirement from rugby league. A couple of days later, he later admitted that he had retired after being charged by the Rugby Football League (RFL) for failing a drugs test. In June 2011, the RFL confirmed that McDermott was banned for two years after testing positive for drostanolone and 19-norandrosterone.

== Mixed martial arts career ==
After being banned from rugby league, McDermott became a MMA fighter. In 2013, he turned professional and fought Thomas Denham at BAMMA 12, but lost by submission.

McDermott competed in the Rizin Fighting Federation Heavyweight Tournament on 29 December 2015, losing in the quarterfinals against former Strikeforce Light Heavyweight Champion Muhammed Lawal by knockout.

McDermott stepped in on a few days notice as a replacement for Vladimir Filipovic to face Liam McGeary in the main event at Bellator 173. He lost the fight via TKO in the second round.

== Personal life ==
McDermott is married with three children. He is of Irish descent.

== Mixed martial arts record ==
Professional record breakdown
14 matches	9 wins	5 losses
By knockout	8	2
By submission	0	2
By decision	1	1
No contests	0	

Res.	Record	Opponent	Method	Event	Date	Round	Time	Location	Notes
Win	9–5	Tony Mustard	TKO (punches)	MTK MMA: Probellum	7 September 2019	1	2.40	Liverpool, England	
Win	8–5	Ruben Wolf	TKO (punches)	BAMMA 29	12 May 2017	2	0.54	Birmingham, England	Return to Heavyweight. Won the vacant BAMMA World Heavyweight Championship.
Loss	7–5	Liam McGeary	TKO (doctor stoppage)	Bellator 173	24 February 2017	2	1:06	Belfast, Northern Ireland	Catchweight (215 lb) bout.
Win	7–4	Dan Konecke	TKO (punches)	Full Contact Contender 17	24 September 2016	2	2:50	Manchester, England	
Loss	6–4	Kenneth Bergh	Submission (guillotine choke)	Clash of the Titans 16	9 July 2016	1	1:02	Cumbria, England	
Win	6–3	Jamie Sloane	KO (punch)	BAMMA 25	14 May 2016	1	3:58	Birmingham, England	
Loss	5–3	Muhammed Lawal	KO (punches)	Rizin World Grand Prix 2015: Part 1 - Saraba	29 December 2015	1	9:20	Saitama, Japan	Heavyweight bout. 2015 Rizin Heavyweight Grand Prix Quarterfinal.
Win	5–2	Pelu Adetola	TKO (punches)	BAMMA 23	14 November 2015	1	1:57	Birmingham, England	
Loss	4–2	Marcin Lazarz	Decision (unanimous)	BAMMA 20	25 April 2015	3	5:00	Birmingham, England	For the vacant BAMMA World Light Heavyweight Championship.
Win	4–1	Oli Thompson	KO (punches)	BAMMA 17	6 December 2014	1	1:43	Manchester, England	
Win	3–1	Paul Bennett	KO (punch)	Stoke Fight Factory: Rage in the Cage 4	26 April 2014	1	1:09	Stoke-on-Trent, England	
Win	2–1	Shaun Lomas	Decision (unanimous)	Stoke Fight Factory: Rage in the Cage 3	30 November 2013	3	5:00	Stoke-on-Trent, England	Return to Light Heavyweight.
Win	1–1	Jason Tyldesley	TKO (punches)	Alpha Male FC 2	6 July 2013	1	1:20	Scarborough, England	Heavyweight debut.
Loss	0–1	Thomas Denham	Submission (rear-naked choke)	BAMMA 12	9 March 2013	2	3:58	Newcastle, England	Light Heavyweight debut.

== Championships and accomplishments ==
Rugby league

Whitehaven

- National League One
  - Champions - 2005

Barrow Raiders

- Division Two Championship
  - Champions – 2009
  - Minor premiership – 2009

BAMMA

- BAMMA World Heavyweight Championship (One time; first)
