= Jai Herbert =

English mixed martial artist

- Born: Jai Kyle Herbert; 13 May 1988 (age 38); Wolverhampton, England
- Other names: The Black Country Banger
- Nationality: English
- Height: 6 ft 1 in (1.85 m)
- Weight: 155 lb (70 kg; 11 st 1 lb)
- Division: Lightweight
- Reach: 77.0 in (196 cm)
- Style: Muay Thai
- Stance: Orthodox
- Fighting out of: Wolverhampton, England
- Team: Team Renegade; Team Kaobon (England); MTK Global
- Rank: Black belt in Brazilian Jiu-Jitsu under Tom Caughey
- Years active: 2015–present

Mixed martial arts record
- Total: 22
- Wins: 15
- By knockout: 10
- By submission: 1
- By decision: 4
- Losses: 6
- By knockout: 3
- By submission: 1
- By decision: 2
- Draws: 1

Amateur record
- Total: 6
- Wins: 5
- By knockout: 3
- By submission: 2
- Losses: 1
- By decision: 1

Other information
- Mixed martial arts record from Sherdog

Jai Kyle Herbert (born 13 May 1988) is an English mixed martial artist who currently fights in the lightweight division of the Ultimate Fighting Championship. He is the former Cage Warriors lightweight champion and also competed in BAMMA.

== Background ==
Herbert was born in Wolverhampton, England. He spent 14 years as a scaffolder and worked a full-time job while competing as an amateur and professional. He didn't turn to full-time fighting until signing with the UFC. As an amateur fighter, Herbert competed at welterweight and didn't consider the strain of a weight cut to be worthwhile at such a level. In August 2020, Herbert was part of Wolverhampton Wanderers' kit launch.

== Mixed martial arts career ==
=== Early career ===
After going 9–1 as an amateur, Herbert made his professional MMA debut in 2015. He recorded consecutive second-round knockouts with Full Contact Contender and later signed a four-fight contract with BAMMA.

On 14 November 2015, Herbert made his promotional debut at BAMMA 23 and beat Ben Bennett via knockout in the second round. On 14 May 2016, he earned a second round submission against Tony Morgan at BAMMA 25. On 16 December, he suffered his first loss against future UFC fighter Rhys McKee in a lightweight title bout at BAMMA 27.

In February 2017, Herbert was due to face Steve Owens at BAMMA 28, but his opponent was forced to withdraw with illness the day before. On 12 May, Herbert beat Rick Selvarajah at BAMMA 29 via knockout in the second round.

In late 2017, Herbert voiced his displeasure about BAMMA's matchmaking. Due to an over-booking of fights by the promotion, Herbert saw a scheduled bout cancelled at late notice due to the number of tickets sold by the fighters. He announced he would not fight under the BAMMA promotion again and subsequently signed with Cage Warriors.

=== Cage Warriors ===
On 16 June 2018, Herbert faced Erdi Karatas at Cage Warriors 94. He won by unanimous decision in the co-main event. He was then due to fight Donovan Desmae at Cage Warriors 98, but had to withdraw two weeks prior to the bout. On 8 December, he returned with a first round knockout against Joe McColgan at Cage Warriors 100.

On 2 March 2019, Herbert appeared in the co-main event at Cage Warriors 102 and beat Steve O'Keefe via a first round knockout. He was then handed his first title opportunity with the promotion and beat Jack Grant at Cage Warriors 106 to claim the vacant lightweight championship. On 26 October, he successfully defended his title against Cain Carrizosa at Cage Warriors 109 with a first round knockout.

=== Ultimate Fighting Championship ===
In January 2020, Herbert signed with the UFC. He was due to face Marc Diakiese as a replacement at UFC Fight Night: Woodley vs. Edwards in March, but the event was later cancelled due to the COVID-19 pandemic.

On 25 July 2020 Herbert faced Francisco Trinaldo at UFC on ESPN 14. He lost the fight via knockout in round three.

Herbert faced Renato Moicano on 26 June 2021 at UFC Fight Night 190. He lost the fight via a rear-naked choke in round two.

Herbert faced Khama Worthy on 23 October 2021 at UFC Fight Night 196. He won the bout via TKO in round one.

Herbert was scheduled to face Mike Davis on 19 March 2022 at UFC Fight Night 204. However, Davis withdrew from the bout for personal reasons and he was replaced by Ilia Topuria. Herbert landed a head kick in the first round that dropped Topuria, but ultimately lost the fight via knockout in round two.

Herbert faced Kyle Nelson on 23 July 2022 at UFC Fight Night 208. He won the fight by unanimous decision.

Herbert faced Ľudovít Klein on 18 March 2023 at UFC 286. After a point deduction in the third round due to multiple groin strikes, the fight ended in a majority draw.

Herbert faced Farès Ziam on 22 July 2023 at UFC Fight Night 224. He lost the fight via unanimous decision.

Herbert faced Rolando Bedoya on 3 August 2024 at UFC on ABC 7. He won the fight by unanimous decision.

Herbert faced Chris Padilla on 22 March 22, 2025, at UFC Fight Night 255. He lost the fight by split decision.

Herbert faced Mandel Nallo on 18 April 2026 at UFC Fight Night 273. He won the fight by technical knockout in the first round.

Herbert faced Matheus Camilo on 10 October 2026 at UFC Fight Night 290. He won the fight by unanimous decision.

== Championships and accomplishments ==
=== Mixed martial arts ===
- Cage Warriors
  - Cage Warriors Lightweight Championship (One time)
    - One successful title defence
  - Cage Warriors Academy South East Lightweight Championship (One time)

== Mixed martial arts record ==
Professional record breakdown
| 22 matches | 15 wins | 6 losses |
| By knockout | 10 | 3 |
| By submission | 1 | 1 |
| By decision | 4 | 2 |
| Draws | 1 | |

| Res. | Record | Opponent | Method | Event | Date | Round | Time | Location | Notes |
|---|---|---|---|---|---|---|---|---|---|
| Win | 15–6–1 | Matheus Camilo | Decision (unanimous) | UFC Fight Night: Allen vs. Duncan | 10 October 2026 | 3 | 5:00 | Las Vegas, Nevada, United States | |
| Win | 14–6–1 | Mandel Nallo | TKO (punches) | UFC Fight Night: Burns vs. Malott | 18 April 2026 | 1 | 2:05 | Winnipeg, Manitoba, Canada | |
| Loss | 13–6–1 | Chris Padilla | Decision (split) | UFC Fight Night: Edwards vs. Brady | 22 March 2025 | 3 | 5:00 | London, England | |
| Win | 13–5–1 | Rolando Bedoya | Decision (unanimous) | UFC on ABC: Sandhagen vs. Nurmagomedov | 3 August 2024 | 3 | 5:00 | Abu Dhabi, United Arab Emirates | |
| Loss | 12–5–1 | Farès Ziam | Decision (unanimous) | UFC Fight Night: Aspinall vs. Tybura | 22 July 2023 | 3 | 5:00 | London, England | |
| Draw | 12–4–1 | Ľudovít Klein | Draw (majority) | UFC 286 | 18 March 2023 | 3 | 5:00 | London, England | Herbert was deducted 1 point in round 3 due to multiple groin strikes. |
| Win | 12–4 | Kyle Nelson | Decision (unanimous) | UFC Fight Night: Blaydes vs. Aspinall | 23 July 2022 | 3 | 5:00 | London, England | |
| Loss | 11–4 | Ilia Topuria | KO (punches) | UFC Fight Night: Volkov vs. Aspinall | 19 March 2022 | 2 | 1:07 | London, England | |
| Win | 11–3 | Khama Worthy | TKO (punches) | UFC Fight Night: Costa vs. Vettori | 23 October 2021 | 1 | 2:47 | Las Vegas, Nevada, United States | |
| Loss | 10–3 | Renato Moicano | Submission (rear-naked choke) | UFC Fight Night: Gane vs. Volkov | 26 June 2021 | 2 | 4:36 | Las Vegas, Nevada, United States | |
| Loss | 10–2 | Francisco Trinaldo | TKO (punch) | UFC on ESPN: Whittaker vs. Till | 25 July 2020 | 3 | 1:30 | Abu Dhabi, United Arab Emirates | Catchweight (160 lb) bout; Trinaldo missed weight. |
| Win | 10–1 | Cain Carrizosa | KO (knee) | Cage Warriors 109 | 26 October 2019 | 1 | 3:26 | Birmingham, England | Defended the Cage Warriors Lightweight Championship. |
| Win | 9–1 | Jack Grant | TKO (punches) | Cage Warriors 106 | 29 June 2019 | 3 | 3:22 | London, England | Won the vacant Cage Warriors Lightweight Championship. |
| Win | 8–1 | Steve O'Keefe | TKO (punches) | Cage Warriors 102 | 2 March 2019 | 1 | 4:07 | London, England | |
| Win | 7–1 | Joe McColgan | TKO (punches) | Cage Warriors 100 | 8 December 2018 | 1 | 2:00 | Cardiff, Wales | |
| Win | 6–1 | Erdi Karatas | Decision (unanimous) | Cage Warriors 94 | 16 June 2018 | 3 | 5:00 | Antwerp, Belgium | |
| Win | 5–1 | Rick Selvarajah | TKO (punches) | BAMMA 29 | 12 May 2017 | 2 | 0:37 | Birmingham, England | |
| Loss | 4–1 | Rhys McKee | KO (punches) | BAMMA 27 | 16 December 2016 | 1 | 1:47 | Dublin, Ireland | For the vacant BAMMA Lightweight Championship. |
| Win | 4–0 | Tony Morgan | Submission (rear-naked choke) | BAMMA 25 | 14 May 2016 | 2 | 2:19 | Birmingham, England | |
| Win | 3–0 | Ben Bennett | KO (body kick) | BAMMA 23 | 14 November 2015 | 2 | 3:59 | Birmingham, England | |
| Win | 2–0 | Martin Sweeney | TKO (punches) | Full Contact Contender 13 | 20 June 2015 | 2 | 0:41 | Horwich, England | |
| Win | 1–0 | Omid Muhammadi | TKO (punches) | Full Contact Contender 12 | 28 March 2015 | 2 | 0:22 | Horwich, England | Lightweight debut. |

== See also ==
- List of current UFC fighters
- List of male mixed martial artists
