= Daniel Movahedi =

English mixed martial arts referee

- Born: Daniel Movahedi; May 26, 1985 (age 41); London, England
- Other names: Dan, The Gentleman
- Nationality: English
- Height: 6 ft 1 in (185 cm)
- Style: Mixed Martial Arts
- Fighting out of: London, England
- Years active: 2005–2011 (MMA)

Mixed martial arts record
- Total: 13
- Wins: 4
- By knockout: 2
- By submission: 2
- Losses: 9
- By knockout: 4
- By submission: 4

Daniel Movahedi (born 26 May 1985) is an English professional mixed martial arts referee and former fighter.

== Career ==
Born in London, England, Dan Movahedi made his debut as a UFC referee during UFC Liverpool in 2018.

== Mixed martial arts record ==
Movahedi is 4–9 in professional MMA with two wins coming via submission and the other two via technical knockout.

Professional record breakdown
13 matches	4 wins	9 losses
By knockout	2	4
By submission	2	4
Unknown	0	1

Res.	Record	Opponent	Method	Event	Date	Round	Time	Location	Notes
Win	4–9	Joe Stevenson	Submission (rear-naked choke)	UCMMA 19: Lights Out	March 26, 2011	1	0:00	London, England	
Loss	3–9	Ben Craggy	TKO (punches)	UCMMA 14: Invincible	August 7, 2010	1	3:16	London, England	
Win	3–8	Ryan Campbell	TKO (punches)	UCMMA 10: Resurrection	February 6, 2010	1	1:16	London, England	
Win	2–8	Michael Sidwell	TKO (punches)	UCMMA 7: Mayhem	September 19, 2009	1	1:37	London, England	
No	1–8	Adam Stanton	Submission (arm-triangle choke)	BAMMA 1: The Fighting Premiership	June 27, 2009	1	1:08	London, England	
Win	1–7	Darren Welsh	Submission (triangle choke)	UCMMA 2: Unbreakable	February 7, 2009	1	2:47	London, England	
Loss	0–7	Edgelson Lua	KO (punch)	Cage Rage Contenders 9	April 12, 2008	1	0:30	London, England	
Loss	0–6	Colin Gough	Submission (arm-triangle choke)	FCFN 5: Full Contact Fight Night 5	November 17, 2007	1	0:52	London, England	
Loss	0–5	Steve Dossett	Submission (guillotine choke)	Cage Rage Contenders 5	June 16, 2007	1	0:53	London, England	
Loss	0–4	Lloyd Clarkson	KO (punch)	Cage Rage Contenders 4	March 3, 2007	1	3:15	London, England	
Loss	0–3	Tony Machado	Submission (rear-naked choke)	Cage Rage Contenders 3	November 12, 2006	1	1:56	London, England	
Loss	0–2	Mark Haigh	N/A	UK-1: Ultimate Fight Night	May 13, 2006	1	0:00	Portsmouth, England	
Loss	0–1	Brian Adams	TKO	FCFN 4: Full Contact Fight Night 4	April 16, 2005	1	2:08	London, England	
