= Rhys McKee =

Northern Irish mixed martial artist

- Born: Rhys Oliver Jason McKee; September 10, 1995 (age 31); Ballymena, Northern Ireland
- Other names: Skeletor
- Height: 6 ft 2 in (1.88 m)
- Weight: 176 lb (80 kg; 12 st 8 lb)
- Division: Lightweight; Welterweight
- Reach: 78 in (198 cm)
- Fighting out of: Ballymena, Northern Ireland
- Team: Fight Academy Ireland; Next Generation I.M.M.A.
- Years active: 2021–present

Mixed martial arts record
- Total: 24
- Wins: 15
- By knockout: 11
- By submission: 3
- By decision: 1
- Losses: 8
- By knockout: 4
- By decision: 4
- Draws: 1

Other information
- Mixed martial arts record from Sherdog

Rhys Oliver Jason McKee (born 10 September 1995) is a Northern Irish professional mixed martial artist competing in the welterweight division of the Professional Fighters League. He has also competed globally for major organizations including the Ultimate Fighting Championship (UFC), Cage Warriors and BAMMA.

== Mixed martial arts career ==
=== Early career ===
McKee achieved a record of 10–2–1 in the BAMMA and Cage Warriors promotions, earning lightweight championships in both organizations before signing with the Ultimate Fighting Championship.

=== Ultimate Fighting Championship ===
McKee made his UFC debut on July 25, 2020 on one week's notice against Khamzat Chimaev at UFC on ESPN 14. He lost the bout via technical knockout in the first round. McKee then faced to Alex Morono on November 14, 2020, at UFC Fight Night 182. He lost the bout via unanimous decision. McKee was released from the UFC shortly after.

Following three victories at Cage Warriors, McKee was re-signed to the UFC in 2023 and faced Ange Loosa on September 2, 2023 at UFC Fight Night 226. He lost the fight via unanimous decision. McKee then faced Chidi Njokuani on March 20, 2024 at UFC on ESPN 54. He lost the fight via split decision.

McKee then faced Daniel Frunza on April 5, 2025 at UFC on ESPN 65. He won the fight by technical knockout via doctor stoppage at the end of the first round, earning him his first UFC win. This fight earned him a Performance of the Night award.

Mckee faced Axel Sola on September 6, 2025 at UFC Fight Night 258. He lost the fight via technical knockout in the third round.

McKee was removed from the UFC roster again following his loss to Sola.

=== Professional Fighters League ===
On March 23, 2026, it was reported that McKee signed with the Professional Fighters League.

In his PFL debut, McKee faced Alex Lohoré on April 16, 2026 at PFL Belfast. He won the fight by unanimous decision.

McKee faced Ernesto Rodriguez on November 14, 2026, at PFL Returns to Dubai. He lost the fight by technical knockout in the first round.

== Championships and accomplishments ==
=== Mixed martial arts ===
- Ultimate Fighting Championship
  - Performance of the Night (One time) vs. Daniel Frunza
- British Association of Mixed Martial Arts
  - BAMMA World Lightweight Championship (One time)
    - One successful title defense
  - BAMMA Lonsdale British Lightweight Championship (One time)
    - One successful title defense
- Cage Warriors
  - Cage Warriors Welterweight Championship (One time)
    - One successful title defense

== Mixed martial arts record ==
Professional record breakdown
| 24 matches | 15 wins | 8 losses |
| By knockout | 11 | 4 |
| By submission | 3 | 0 |
| By decision | 1 | 4 |
| Draws | 1 | |

| Res. | Record | Opponent | Method | Event | Date | Round | Time | Location | Notes |
|---|---|---|---|---|---|---|---|---|---|
| Loss | 15–8–1 | Ernesto Rodriguez | TKO (punches) | PFL Dubai: Nemkov vs. Bilostenniy | 14 November 2026 | 1 | 2:28 | Dubai, United Arab Emirates | |
| Win | 15–7–1 | Alex Lohoré | Decision (unanimous) | PFL Belfast: Kelly vs. Wilson | 16 April 2026 | 3 | 5:00 | Belfast, Northern Ireland | Catchweight (176 lb) bout. |
| Loss | 14–7–1 | Axel Sola | TKO (punches) | UFC Fight Night: Imavov vs. Borralho | 6 September 2025 | 3 | 2:02 | Paris, France | |
| Win | 14–6–1 | Daniel Frunza | TKO (doctor stoppage) | UFC on ESPN: Emmett vs. Murphy | 5 April 2025 | 1 | 5:00 | Las Vegas, Nevada, United States | Performance of the Night. |
| Loss | 13–6–1 | Chidi Njokuani | Decision (split) | UFC on ESPN: Blanchfield vs. Fiorot | 30 March 2024 | 3 | 5:00 | Atlantic City, New Jersey, United States | |
| Loss | 13–5–1 | Ange Loosa | Decision (unanimous) | UFC Fight Night: Gane vs. Spivac | 2 September 2023 | 3 | 5:00 | Paris, France | |
| Win | 13–4–1 | Jim Wallhead | TKO (corner stoppage) | Cage Warriors 153 | 29 April 2023 | 4 | 5:00 | Dublin, Ireland | Defended and unified the Cage Warriors Welterweight Championship. |
| Win | 12–4–1 | Justin Burlinson | KO (punches) | Cage Warriors 140 | 25 June 2022 | 3 | 0:25 | Belfast, Northern Ireland | Won the vacant Cage Warriors Welterweight Championship. |
| Win | 11–4–1 | Aleksi Mäntykivi | TKO (punch) | Cage Warriors 129 | 2 October 2021 | 3 | 3:18 | London, England | |
| Loss | 10–4–1 | Alex Morono | Decision (unanimous) | UFC Fight Night: Felder vs. dos Anjos | 14 November 2020 | 3 | 5:00 | Las Vegas, Nevada, United States | |
| Loss | 10–3–1 | Khamzat Chimaev | TKO (punches) | UFC on ESPN: Whittaker vs. Till | 25 July 2020 | 1 | 3:09 | Abu Dhabi, United Arab Emirates | |
| Win | 10–2–1 | Håkon Foss | TKO (punches) | Cage Warriors 110 | 9 November 2019 | 1 | 1:03 | Cork, Ireland | Return to Welterweight. |
| Win | 9–2–1 | Perry Goodwin | Submission (guillotine choke) | Cage Warriors 102 | 2 March 2019 | 3 | 2:30 | London, England | |
| Win | 8–2–1 | Jefferson George | TKO (punches) | Cage Warriors 100 | 8 December 2018 | 1 | 4:44 | Cardiff, Wales | |
| Loss | 7–2–1 | Terry Brazier | Decision (unanimous) | BAMMA 36 | 28 June 2018 | 3 | 5:00 | London, England | Lost the BAMMA World Lightweight Championship. |
| Win | 7–1–1 | Tim Barnett | TKO (punches and knees) | BAMMA 34 | 9 March 2018 | 1 | 4:30 | London, England | Won the vacant BAMMA World Lightweight Championship. |
| Win | 6–1–1 | Kams Ekpo | Submission (triangle choke) | BAMMA 33 | 15 December 2017 | 1 | 2:08 | Newcastle, England | |
| Draw | 5–1–1 | Richie Smullen | Draw (majority) | BAMMA 30 | 7 July 2017 | 3 | 5:00 | Dublin, Ireland | |
| Loss | 5–1 | Tim Barnett | TKO (punches and knees) | BAMMA 28 | 24 February 2017 | 1 | 4:58 | Belfast, Northern Ireland | Lost the BAMMA Lonsdale Lightweight Championship. |
| Win | 5–0 | Jai Herbert | KO (punches) | BAMMA 27 | 16 December 2016 | 1 | 1:47 | Dublin, Ireland | Won the BAMMA Lonsdale Lightweight Championship. |
| Win | 4–0 | Tommy McCafferty | TKO (punches) | BAMMA 26 | 10 September 2016 | 1 | 0:58 | Dublin, Ireland | |
| Win | 3–0 | Shaun Luther | TKO (punches) | Total Full Contact: Warlords 2 | 11 June 2016 | 2 | N/A | Bridgwater, England | |
| Win | 2–0 | Alex Masuku | KO (head kick) | BAMMA 24 | 27 February 2016 | 2 | 2:51 | Dublin, Ireland | Lightweight debut. |
| Win | 1–0 | John Redmond | Submission (rear-naked choke) | BAMMA 22 | 19 September 2015 | 1 | 4:36 | Dublin, Ireland | Welterweight debut. |

== See also ==
- List of male mixed martial artists
