= Jim Wallhead =

English mixed martial arts fighter

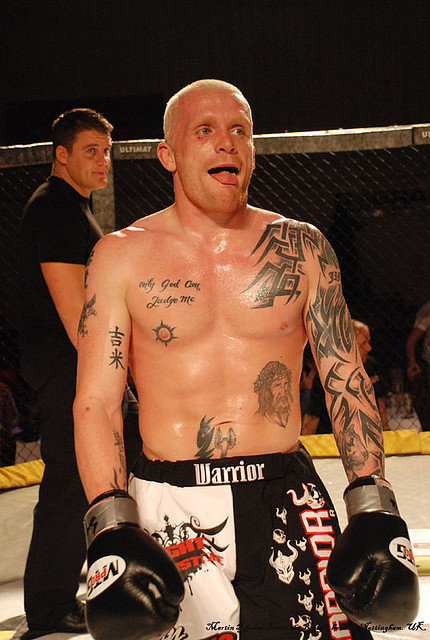
- Born: 14 March 1984 (age 42)
- Other names: Judo
- Nationality: English
- Height: 5 ft 10 in (1.78 m)
- Weight: 170 lb (77 kg; 12 st)
- Division: Welterweight; Middleweight; Light Heavyweight
- Style: Boxing, Judo
- Stance: Orthodox
- Fighting out of: Leicestershire, England
- Team: Hardy-Wallhead MMA
- Rank: Black belt in Judo
- Years active: 2005–2023

Mixed martial arts record
- Total: 45
- Wins: 33
- By knockout: 13
- By submission: 10
- By decision: 10
- Losses: 12
- By knockout: 3
- By submission: 4
- By decision: 5

Other information
- Mixed martial arts record from Sherdog

Jim Wallhead (born 14 March 1984) is an English former professional mixed martial artist who competed in the Welterweight division. He has competed for BAMMA, Bellator, and M-1 Challenge and the UFC.

Wallhead is a member of Team Rough House and Leicester Shootfighters. In addition to his training at Leicester Shootfighters, Wallhead also works as a coach. Wallhead joined Team Rough House after back-to-back losses at the beginning of his professional career and dropped his competing weight from Light Heavyweight and Middleweight to Welterweight.

== Mixed martial arts career ==
=== Background ===
Wallhead comes from a judo background, where he holds a black belt. He was introduced to judo accidentally after being taken to a class that was believed to be a karate class. Wallhead was successful early in his judo career for the Beaumont Leys Judo club, before moving to a club in Coventry under Olympic silver medallist Neil Adams. Under Adams, Wallhead won three Under-21s British titles as well as placing 7th in the European youth Olympics.

Wallhead joined Team Rough House in 2005, following back-to-back losses between May and July 2005. Wallhead is still a member of Team Rough House to this date, alongside fighters such as Dan Hardy, Ross Pearson, Paul Daley and Andre Winner. Wallhead also trains Muay Thai with the former multi-time Kickboxing champion Owen Comerie, who previously trained Dan Hardy. Wallhead works his strength and conditioning with Ollie Richardson at the Leicester Tigers Rugby Union training ground. Wallhead also trains Brazilian jiu-jitsu under Victor Estima, he holds a Black Belt under him.

=== Early career ===
Early in his career, Wallhead was associated with the Urban Combat Leicester team. He made his semi-professional debut against Steve Matthews on 8 April 2005, in a two-round fight. This fight was fought at heavyweight, at the "Cage Warriors: Quest" event where Wallhead was able to defeat his opponent with a rear naked choke after 27 seconds of the first round.

Wallhead soon turned professional and on 30 April 2005, he made his debut at Cage Warriors: Ultimate Force. Jim fought Leslee Ojugbana, utilising knee strikes from the clinch, whilst preventing Ojugbana from succeeding with takedown attempts. After one-sided striking from Wallhead, Ojugbana gave up his back and Wallhead was able to pull off a rear naked choke for his debut win after just 64 seconds.

Wallhead competed just weeks later and made his second professional appearance against Boris Jonstomp at Cage Warriors: Strike Force. This fight was fought at the lower weight of middleweight and saw Wallhead succeed with judo throw attempts early in the fight. However, Wallhead's ground game was not to the same standard at Jonstomp's and he lost via first round submission (neck crank) after 4:20.

This was followed up by his second consecutive loss, two months later at the Cage Warriors: Quest 2 event, at the hands of Chris Rice. Wallhead was TKOd 3:32 into the first round, resulting in a 1–2 record at the start of his professional MMA career. Following this loss, Wallhead joined Team Rough House after meeting Dan Hardy and receiving an invitation to join the team. Upon doing so, Wallhead dropped two weight categories to his current status as a welterweight.

=== Early affiliation with Team Rough House ===
In his welterweight debut and his first fight under Team Rough House affiliation, Wallhead was victorious. The fight took place at Cage Warriors: Strike Force 3 where Wallhead faced Greco-Roman wrestler Steve Singh-Sidhu. Though Wallhead had dropped to welterweight, he still had a considerable weight advantage over his opponent who weighed in at 3.5 kg less than Wallhead. This perhaps was significant as Singh-Sidhu's strikes seemed to have little bearing on Wallhead, who was able to land takedowns and a standing choke. Midway through the first round, Singh-Sidhu appeared to be backing away from Wallhead, who chased him down with punches and knees to the head. After a shin strike to the head, Singh-Sidhu's corner threw in the towel, resulting in a first-round TKO victory for Wallhead.

In December 2005, Wallhead fought Welshman Paul Jenkins. This was Wallhead's first title fight in mixed martial arts, as they competed for the House of Pain Welterweight title in front of Jenkins' home crowd of Cardiff, Wales. Wallhead won the fight via majority decision after five rounds, giving him the title. Just over two years to that day, Wallhead rematched Jenkins in a kickboxing bout (thus not counting towards his pro-MMA record); this time in Wallhead's hometown of Nottingham. Wallhead showed effective low kicks and combinations which earned him a unanimous decision victory.

After his third successive victory, with his win over Henning Svendsen in March 2006, Wallhead made his first title defense of his House of Pain Welterweight title just two weeks later. His opponent was John Phillips who was making his second professional appearance. Wallhead defeated Phillips to retain the title, after a TKO victory due to elbows.

After going 4–0 under the tutelage of Team Rough House, Wallhead then faced Peter Angerer in May 2006. Despite controlling the fight, Angerer defeated Wallhead via submission (arm-triangle choke). During the submission attempt, Wallhead's arm was stuck, meaning he had to tap with his feet, earning the nickname "Scuba Steve" from his teammates.

=== European and worldwide exposure ===
Following his loss to Angerer, Wallhead entered the 2H2H 83 kg tournament in Holland, on just 72 hours notice, despite the tournament being at a higher weight than he was adjusted to. In the first round of the tournament, Wallhead defeated Camara Bouna via two-round decision, before defeating Xander Nel in the final via TKO.

Wallhead then captured the Cage Gladiators British Welterweight Title, defeating the UFC veteran Jason Tan.

Returning to Cage Warriors, Wallhead faced the UFC-bound Dennis Siver. Despite being on a three fight winning streak, Wallhead was submitted via armbar taking his record to 8–4. Wallhead faced Lewis Barrow four months later and won via submission (punches) to begin a four fight win streak. Wallhead's next three fights resulted in submission victories; a victory via choke over Jordan James, an arm-triangle choke victory over Soli Clichko and a rear naked choke victory over Steven Lynch.

Wallhead began to gain more recognition and exposure in the United States when his fight against Charles Blanchard was featured on Inside MMA on HDNet. Unfortunately for Wallhead, this fight resulted in a decision loss. Wallhead would later state: "I didn't throw my hands enough in the first round when I was fresh and that's my own fault."

Wallhead then began to show improved boxing and knockout power in his next few fights, the first of which was against Tom Haddock in April 2008 who he defeated via submission due to punches.

Just under three months later, Wallhead faced off against Fabricio Nascimento. Wallhead kept the fight on their feet throughout, preventing Nascimento's takedowns. Frustrated by Wallhead's superior boxing, Nascimento visibly showed his disdain. Wallhead took the unanimous decision victory which was regarded as the most important victory he had claimed at that stage in his career.

Wallhead's next fight came at M-1 Challenge UK in September 2008 and was intended to be against Jason Ball. However, Ball had to withdraw with a knee injury and was replaced by Igor Araújo. In preparation for his fight with Araújo, Wallhead temporarily joined Xtreme Couture Mixed Martial Arts in Las Vegas, Nevada to further polish his skills.

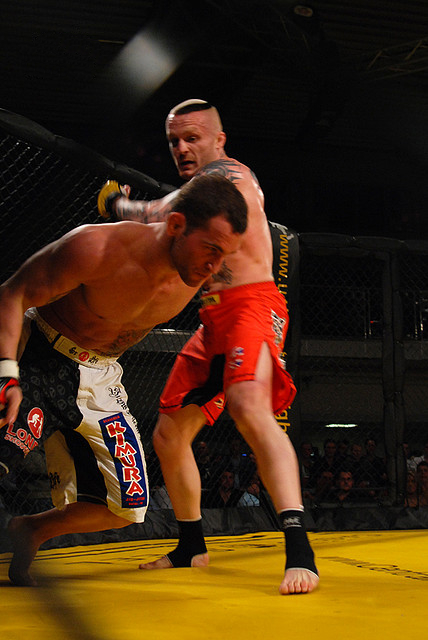
Wallhead continued to show his much improved boxing, most notably this knockout of Fabio Toldo.

Araújo himself had just finished training at Xtreme Couture and entered the fight having won seven of his last eight fights. After just 79 seconds, Wallhead won via TKO due to punches - the fifth TKO victory of his career.

Wallhead then applied to become a castmember of The Ultimate Fighter: United States vs. United Kingdom. After passing the assessment and interview successfully, he was told he was "too experienced" for the show, though strangely, he was instead made into an "alternate" who would step up if another castmember withdrew with injury.

Wallhead would then have an eight-month layoff. This was due to his signing with the debuting "British Fighting Championships" - an organisation aimed at combining domestic British MMA into one entity - that would eventually dissolve before its premiere broadcast. The knockout-style tournament saw him drawn against the Brazilian Fabio Toldo. However, the BFC organisation would eventually dissolve and in May 2009, the Ultimate Force organisation picked up the fight. The fight saw Wallhead continue to use his improved boxing after an early scare, where Toldo knocked Wallhead down. Wallhead would go on to defeat his opponent via knockout, which was described by one of Wallhead's team mates as "one of the worst knockouts they've seen".

In September 2009, Wallhead won the Clash of Warriors Welterweight title by defeating Marius Buzinskas.

In November 2009, Wallhead scored arguably the most high-profile win of his career when he defeated The Ultimate Fighter: United States vs. United Kingdom participant Che Mills at "Knuckleup At The Manor" in Newport, Wales. The fight, which was seen as "a clash between the UK’s two top unsigned welterweights," was a close fight that was difficult to score for the judges. Mills was able to block Wallhead's takedown attempts and get back up quickly when Wallhead was successful. In the first round, Wallhead was able to take Mills down and get into side mount, though Mills almost won the first round in the eyes of the judges after a late flurry of strikes. The second round saw Mills use foot stomps and elbows from the clinch, which prevented Wallhead from utilising his wrestling. In the final round, Wallhead continued with takedowns before hitting Mills with elbows. With 45 seconds of the fight remaining, Wallhead was able to cut Mills with his strikes.

Wallhead's overall control, strategy and constant aggression led to him taking a unanimous decision.

=== Bellator Fighting Championships ===
Despite speculation about joining the UFC, in December 2009, Wallhead was signed by the Bellator Fighting Championships to compete in their 2010 eight man, number 1 contender Welterweight Tournament, which began on 8 April 2010.

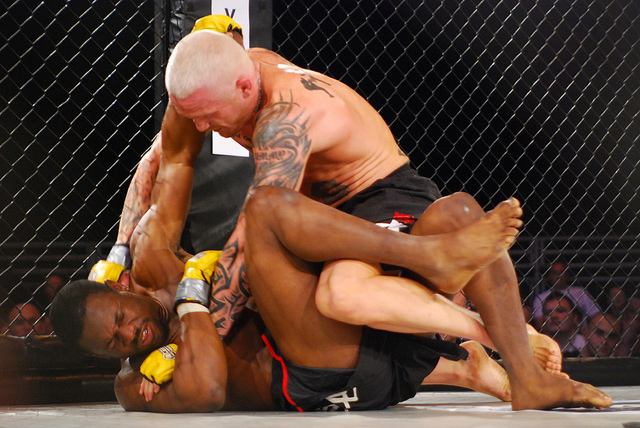
Wallhead returned after a long absence due to his withdrawal from the Bellator tournament, to defeat Shaun Lomas via rear naked choke in a middleweight bout.

Wallhead's first appearance in the tournament was scheduled to be at Bellator 15 against the American Jacob McClintock.

However, on 20 April, just two days before his fight with McClintock, Wallhead was forced to withdraw from the Bellator tournament as he was grounded in England due to the 2010 eruptions of Eyjafjallajökull. Wallhead was replaced by Ryan Thomas.

A month later, Bellator CEO Bjorn Rebney stated that they were aiming to include Wallhead in the third season - despite the absence of a welterweight tournament - with a view to including him in the fourth season's welterweight tournament.

In the meantime, Wallhead took a fight in Cage Warriors against Shaun Lomas and defeated him via rear naked choke in the first round. Due to an injury to Wallhead's previous opponent, Lomas had to step in at short notice, meaning that Wallhead competed at middleweight for the first time in two years.

Bellator's plans to include Wallhead in their third season were confirmed in September 2010, when Wallhead signed to face Ryan Thomas on 14 October 2010 at Bellator 32. Wallhead went on to defeat Thomas via unanimous decision (29–28, 29–28, 29–28).

In the fourth season welterweight tournament opening round, Wallhead faced fellow judoka, Rick Hawn, losing via unanimous decision.

=== BAMMA ===
Wallhead made his BAMMA debut at BAMMA 7 against Frank Trigg. Trigg was set to face Tom 'Kong' Watson for Watson's middleweight title, but Watson suffered a back injury forcing his withdrawal and allowing Wallhead to step up as his replacement. In the opening round, Wallhead caught Trigg with a left hook which appeared to hurt him, before executing a successful takedown. He ended the first round landing ground-and-pound shots which opened up a cut on Trigg's cheek. The second round saw Wallhead land the stronger strikes, but less often than Trigg. The final round was also close, though Wallhead once again managed to rock Trigg early in the round. The fight went to the judges, where Wallhead won via split decision (29-28, 28-29 and 30-27).

He competed at BAMMA 8 in a welterweight bout against Joey Villasenor, winning via first-round KO.

Wallhead faced off against UFC veteran Matt Veach in the main event of BAMMA 12 in Newcastle, England on 9 March 2013. He won the fight via submission in the first round.

=== Return to Bellator ===
Wallhead returned to Bellator to compete in the season seven welterweight tournament. His opening round match was against Lyman Good. He lost the fight via unanimous decision.

=== Back to BAMMA ===
On 9 March 2013 he took on UFC veteran Matt Veach at BAMMA 12, winning by first round submission due to Rear-Naked Choke. Wallhead faced former TUF contestant Eddy Ellis at BAMMA 13 on 14 September 2013. He lost the fight in a highly controversial decision after breaking Ellis' jaw in the first round and stuffing many of his takedown attempts.

=== KSW ===
In mid-2015, Wallhead signed with Poland-based promotion Konfrontacja Sztuk Walki, and faced Rafał Moks at KSW 32: Road to Wembley in a welterweight bout on 31 October 2015. He won the bout via TKO due to punches.

=== WFCA ===
On 9 April 2016, Wallhead fought at WFCA 17 against Gennadiy Kovalev. He won the bout via unanimous decision

=== Ultimate Fighting Championship ===
On 27 June 2016, Wallhead signed with the UFC to fight Jessin Ayari at UFC Fight Night 93, replacing Emil Meek. He lost the fight via split decision.

Wallhead faced Luan Chagas on 3 June 2017 at UFC 212. He lost the fight via submission due to a rear-naked choke in the second round.

Wallhead was expected to face Warlley Alves on 21 October 2017 at UFC Fight Night 118. However, Wallhead pulled out of the fight on 14 October citing an injury.

Wallhead was tested positive from an out-of-competition test collected on 7 October 2017 by USADA . On February 6, 2018 he received a nine month USADA suspension for violation for tested ostarine and its metabolite as the result of a contaminated supplement and clear to compete again on July 7, 2018.

=== Bellator MMA ===
In his Bellator debut, Wallhead faced Abner Lloveras on 9 February 2019 at Bellator: Newcastle. He won the bout via unanimous decision.

Wallhead faced Giorgio Pietrini on 4 May 2019 at Bellator: Birmingham. He won the bout via unanimous decision.

=== Cage Warriors ===
Wallhead faced Daniel Skibiński at Cage Warriors 141 on 22 July 2022. He won the bout via TKO stoppage in the first round.

Wallhead faced Mateusz Figlak for the Interim Cage Warriors Welterweight Championship on 12 November 2022 at Cage Warriors 146. He won the title and the bout, knocking out Figlak in the first round.

Wallhead faced Rhys McKee on 29 April 2023 at Cage Warriors 153 in a unification of the Cage Warriors Welterweight Championship. Wallhead's corner threw in the towel at the end of the fourth round, with Wallhead retiring from MMA after the bout.

== Bare-knuckle boxing ==
Wallhead made his Bare Knuckle Fighting Championship debut against Dawid Chylinski on 28 June 2025 at BKFC 77. He lost by knockout in the first round.

== Championships and accomplishments ==
=== Mixed martial arts ===
- Cage Warriors
  - Interim Cage Warriors Welterweight Championship
- Clash of Warriors
  - COW Welterweight Championship (one time)
- Cage Gladiators
  - CG British Welterweight Championship (one time)
- House of Pain
  - HoP Welterweight Championship (one time)
  - One successful title defense
- 2 Hot 2 Handle
  - 2H2H: Road to Japan 83 kg tournament winner

== Mixed martial arts record ==
Professional record breakdown
45 matches	33 wins	12 losses
By knockout	13	3
By submission	10	4
By decision	10	5

Res.	Record	Opponent	Method	Event	Date	Round	Time	Location	Notes
Loss	33–12	Rhys McKee	TKO (corner stoppage)	Cage Warriors 153	29 April 2023	4	5:00	Dublin, Ireland	For the Cage Warriors Welterweight Championship.
Win	33–11	Mateusz Figlak	KO (punches)	Cage Warriors 146	12 November 2022	1	1:39	Manchester, England	Won the interim Cage Warriors Welterweight Championship.
Win	32–11	Daniel Skibiński	TKO (punch)	Cage Warriors 141	22 July 2022	1	1:26	London, England	
Win	31–11	Giorgio Pietrini	Decision (unanimous)	Bellator: Birmingham	4 May 2019	3	5:00	Birmingham, England, United Kingdom	
Win	30–11	Abner Lloveras	Decision (unanimous)	Bellator: Newcastle	9 February 2019	3	5:00	Newcastle upon Tyne, England	
Loss	29–11	Luan Chagas	Submission (rear-naked choke)	UFC 212	3 June 2017	2	4:48	Rio de Janeiro, Brazil	
Loss	29–10	Jessin Ayari	Decision (split)	UFC Fight Night: Arlovski vs. Barnett	3 September 2016	3	5:00	Hamburg, Germany	
Win	29–9	Gennadiy Kovalev	Decision (unanimous)	WFCA 17 - Grand Prix Akhmat 2016	9 April 2016	3	5:00	Grozny, Russia	
Win	28–9	Rafał Moks	KO (punch)	KSW 32: Road to Wembley	31 October 2015	2	2:26	London, England	
Win	27–9	Rodrigo Ribeiro	KO (punch)	Abu Dhabi Warriors 2	26 March 2015	1	3:10	Abu Dhabi, United Arab Emirates	
Win	26–9	Juan Manuel Suarez	KO (punches)	CWFC 73: Ray vs. Warburton 3	1 November 2014	1	1:49	Newcastle upon Tyne, England	
Loss	25–9	Danny Roberts	KO (punches)	CWFC 68: Roberts vs. Wallhead	3 May 2014	1	4:49	Liverpool, England	
Win	25–8	Florent Betorangal	KO (slam)	BAMMA 14	14 December 2013	3	0:21	Birmingham, England	
Loss	24–8	Eddy Ellis	Decision (split)	BAMMA 13	14 September 2013	3	5:00	Birmingham, England	For the inaugural BAMMA World Welterweight Championship.
Win	24–7	Matt Veach	Submission (rear-naked choke)	BAMMA 12	9 March 2013	1	3:05	Newcastle upon Tyne, England	
Loss	23–7	Lyman Good	Decision (unanimous)	Bellator 74	28 September 2012	3	5:00	Atlantic City, New Jersey, United States	Welterweight tournament quarterfinal.
Win	23–6	Joey Villaseñor	KO (punches)	BAMMA 8	10 December 2011	1	0:48	Nottingham, England	
Win	22–6	Frank Trigg	Decision (split)	BAMMA 7	10 September 2011	3	5:00	Birmingham, England	Middleweight bout.
Loss	21–6	Rick Hawn	Decision (unanimous)	Bellator 35	5 March 2011	3	5:00	Lemoore, California, United States	Welterweight tournament quarterfinal.
Win	21–5	Ryan Thomas	Decision (unanimous)	Bellator 32	14 October 2010	3	5:00	Kansas City, Missouri, United States	
Win	20–5	Shaun Lomas	Submission (rear-naked choke)	Cage Warriors 37: Right to Fight	22 May 2010	1	2:34	Birmingham, England	Middleweight bout.
Win	19–5	Che Mills	Decision (unanimous)	KnuckleUp MMA 3: Mills vs. Wallhead	1 November 2009	3	5:00	Newport, Wales	
Win	18–5	Marius Buzinskas	Submission (neck crank)	Clash of Warriors 7: No Way Out	5 September 2009	1	1:08	Nottingham, England	Won the COW Welterweight Championship.
Win	17–5	Fabio Santana Toldo	KO (punches)	Ultimate Force: Oblivion	16 May 2009	1	3:46	Doncaster, England	
Win	16–5	Igor Araújo	TKO (punches)	M-1 Challenge 7: UK	27 September 2008	1	1:19	Nottingham, England	
Win	15–5	Fabricio Nascimento	Decision (unanimous)	Cage Warriors: Enter the Rough House 7	12 July 2008	3	5:00	Nottingham, England	
Win	14–5	Tom Haddock	Submission (punches)	Cage Warriors: Enter the Rough House 6	19 April 2008	2	3:49	Nottingham, England	Middleweight bout.
Loss	13–5	Charles Blanchard	Decision (unanimous)	Cage Warriors: USA Battle Royale	29 March 2008	3	5:00	Kissimmee, Florida, United States	
Win	13–4	Steven Lynch	Submission (rear-naked choke)	CWFC: Enter The Rough House 4	14 October 2007	1	1:53	Nottingham, England	
Win	12–4	Marius Liaukevicius	Technical Submission (arm-triangle choke)	CWFC: Enter The Rough House 3	21 July 2007	1	2:52	Nottingham, England	
Win	11–4	Jordan James	Submission (choke)	House of Pain: Fight Night 9	3 June 2007	1	4:09	Swansea, Wales	
Win	10–4	Lewis Barrow	Submission (punches)	CWFC: Enter The Rough House 2	28 April 2007	2	1:40	Nottingham, England	
Loss	9–4	Dennis Siver	Submission (armbar)	CWFC: Enter The Rough House	9 December 2006	2	3:31	Nottingham, England	
Win	9–3	Jason Tan	Decision (split)	Cage Gladiators II: The Next Generation	3 September 2006	3	5:00	Liverpool, England	Won the Cage Gladiators British Welterweight Championship.
Win	8–3	Xander Nel	TKO (punches)	2 Hot 2 Handle: Road To Japan	18 June 2006	1	2:06	Amsterdam, Netherlands	Won the 2H2H 83 kg tournament.
Win	7–3	Camara Bouna	Decision	2 Hot 2 Handle: Road To Japan	18 June 2006	2	3:00	Amsterdam, Netherlands	2H2H 83 kg tournament opening round.
Loss	6–3	Peter Angerer	Submission (arm-triangle choke)	CWFC: Strike Force 6	27 May 2006	1	1:49	Coventry, England	
Win	6–2	John Phillips	TKO (elbows)	House of Pain: Fight Night 5	9 April 2006	1	1:41	Swansea, Wales	Defended the House of Pain Welterweight Championship.
Win	5–2	Henning Svendsen	TKO (punches)	CWFC: Strike Force 5	25 March 2006	1	2:06	Coventry, England	
Win	4–2	Paul Jenkins	Decision (majority)	House of Pain: Fight Night 4	3 December 2005	5	5:00	Cardiff, Wales	Won the House of Pain Welterweight Championship.
Win	3–2	Steve Singh-Sidhu	TKO (corner stoppage)	CWFC: Strike Force 3	1 October 2005	1	3:14	Coventry, England	Welterweight debut.
Loss	2–2	Chris Rice	TKO (punches)	CWFC: Quest 2	29 July 2005	1	3:32	Sheffield, England	Light Heavyweight bout.
Loss	2–1	Boris Jonstomp	Submission (neck crank)	CWFC: Strike Force	21 May 2005	1	4:20	Coventry, England	Middleweight bout.
Win	2–0	Leslee Ojugbana	Submission (rear-naked choke)	CWFC: Ultimate Force	30 April 2005	1	1:20	Sheffield, England	Light Heavyweight bout.
Win	1–0	Steve Mathews	Submission (rear-naked choke)	CWFC: Quest 1	8 April 2005	1	N/A	Sheffield, England	

== Titles and accomplishments ==
- Judo
  - Three time Under-21 British Judo champion
  - Seventh place in the European Youth Olympics
- Mixed Martial Arts
  - Former House of Pain Welterweight champion (defended once, then relinquished)
  - 2H2H 83 kg tournament winner
  - Former Cage Gladiators British Welterweight champion
  - Clash of Warriors Welterweight champion

== Personal life ==
Wallhead has a son and a daughter.

== See also ==
- List of current UFC fighters
- List of Bellator MMA alumni
- List of male mixed martial artists
