= List of BAMMA events =

UK mixed martial arts events

This is a listing of event held by the British Association of Mixed Martial Arts.

== BAMMA 1: The Fighting Premiership ==
BAMMA 1
- Promotion: British Association of Mixed Martial Arts
- Date: 27 June 2009
- Venue: Room by the River
- City: London, United Kingdom

Event chronology
BAMMA 1	BAMMA 2

BAMMA 1 was a mixed martial arts event held by the British Association of Mixed Martial Arts on 27 June 2009 at the Room by the River in London. The event was televised on Bravo in the United Kingdom.

The event was held in a tournament format, with two semi-finals taking place in the Lightweight, Welterweight and Middleweight divisions. The semi-final winners progressed to the final, which is to take place at a later date.

Results

Preliminary
Weight class				Method	Round	Time	Notes
Lightweight	Radek Piechnik	def	Spencer McMorris	TKO (punches)	1	1:57
Middleweight	Kes Kpokpogri	def	Ben Craggy	Decision (unanimous)	3	5:00
Middleweight	Adam Stanton	def	Dan Movahedi	Submission (arm-triangle choke)	1	1:08
Main
Weight class				Method	Round	Time	Notes
Lightweight	Francis Heagney	def	Zack Jones	TKO (punches)	1	3:08
Lightweight	Tim Radcliffe	def	Abdul Mohammed	Decision (unanimous)	3	5:00
Welterweight	Eugene Fadiora	def	Nathan Champ	Decision (unanimous)	3	5:00
Welterweight	Che Mills	def	Edgelson Lua	Decision (unanimous)	3	5:00
Middleweight	Denniston Sutherland	def	John Phillips	Submission (punches)	1	3:32
Middleweight	Tom Watson	def	John Maguire	TKO (punches)	3	2:47

== BAMMA 2: Roundhouses at the Roundhouse ==
BAMMA 2
- Promotion: British Association of Mixed Martial Arts
- Date: 13 February 2010
- Venue: The Roundhouse
- City: London, United Kingdom
- Attendance: 2,163

Event chronology
BAMMA 1	BAMMA 2	BAMMA 3

BAMMA 2 was a mixed martial arts event held by the British Association of Mixed Martial Arts on 13 February 2010 at The Roundhouse in London. The event was televised on Bravo in the United Kingdom.

Mark Adams was scheduled to fight Paul Reed in the main event for the vacant Featherweight Title. However, he was picked up an injury two weeks before the fight and was replaced by Germany's Alan Omer. Omer, also admitted to having an injury but went ahead with the fight nonetheless. Chris Stringer was also set up against AJ Wenn, but Wenn ended up fighting Ali McClean instead.

Results

Preliminary
Weight class				Method	Round	Time	Notes
Welterweight	Charlie Leary	def	Panayiotis Tsimonos	TKO (punches)	2
Welterweight	Stuart Rickman	def	Nathan Champ	Submission (rear-naked choke)	1
Lightweight	Peter Duncan	def	Alexandre Izidro	Decision (unanimous)	3	5:00
Featherweight	Phil Harris	def	Steve McCombe	Decision (unanimous)	3	5:00
Main
Weight class				Method	Round	Time	Notes
Lightweight	Ali McClean	drew with	AJ Wenn	Draw	3	5:00
Middleweight	Mike Ling	def	Russell Smith	Submission (rear-naked choke)	1	4:47
Lightweight	Rob Sinclair	def	Nathan Beer	TKO (punches)	1	3:42	For 1st BAMMA Lightweight Champion
Welterweight	Gunnar Nelson	def	Sam Elsdon	Submission (rear-naked choke)	1	2:30
Featherweight	Alan Omer	def	Paul Reed	Submission (triangle choke)	4	2:10	For 1st BAMMA Featherweight Champion

== BAMMA 3: Horwich vs. Watson ==
BAMMA 3: Horwich vs. Watson
- Promotion: British Association of Mixed Martial Arts
- Date: 15 May 2010
- Venue: LG Arena
- City: Birmingham, United Kingdom
- Attendance: 5,292

Event chronology
BAMMA 2	BAMMA 3: Horwich vs. Watson	BAMMA 4

BAMMA 3: Horwich vs. Watson was a mixed martial arts event held by the British Association of Mixed Martial Arts on 15 May 2010 at the LG Arena in Birmingham. It featured three title fights, and was headlined by Matt Horwich and Tom Watson. The event was televised on Bravo in the United Kingdom.

Tabloid celebrity and former MMA fighter Alex Reid was scheduled to return to the cage and face Tom Watson at the event. However, Reid injured his knee while filming his documentary TV series Alex Reid: The Fight of His Life and was forced to pull out of the fight. This angered Watson, who claimed Reid was disrespecting him. Watson also called him a "clown" and said that it was likely Reid pulled out to avoid an embarrassing defeat. Reid was then replaced by UFC and IFL veteran Matt Horwich.

Results

Preliminary
Weight class				Method	Round	Time	Notes
Featherweight	Martin McDonagh	def	Mike Wood	Submission (triangle choke)	1	3:52
Featherweight	Phil Harris	def	Neil Seery	Decision (unanimous)	3	5:00
Featherweight	Ashleigh Grimshaw	def	Paul Reed	KO (punches)	1	1:04
Featherweight	Jeff Lawson	def	David Lee	Submission (armbar)	1	0:57
Middleweight	Carl Noon	def	Mike Ling	Submission (rear-naked choke)	1	3:48
Welterweight	Simeon Thoresen	def	John Maguire	Decision (unanimous)	3	5:00
Main
Weight class				Method	Round	Time	Notes
Featherweight	Mark Adams	def	Alan Omer	Decision (unanimous)	5	5:00	For BAMMA Featherweight Champion
Welterweight	War Machine	def	Zach Light	Technical submission (rear-naked choke)	1	1:09
Lightweight	Rob Sinclair	def	Daniel Weichel	TKO (punches)	1	4:03	For BAMMA Lightweight Champion
Light Heavyweight	Seth Petruzelli	def	Ryan White	Submission (armbar)	1	1:07
Middleweight	Tom Watson	def	Matt Horwich	Decision Unanimous	5	5:00	For 1st BAMMA Middleweight Champion

== BAMMA 4: Reid vs. Watson ==
BAMMA 4: Reid vs. Watson
- Promotion: British Association of Mixed Martial Arts
- Date: 25 September 2010
- Venue: National Indoor Arena
- City: Birmingham, United Kingdom
- Attendance: 5,438

Event chronology
BAMMA 3	BAMMA 4: Reid vs. Watson	BAMMA 5

BAMMA 4: Reid vs. Watson was a mixed martial arts event held by the British Association of Mixed Martial Arts on 25 September 2010 at the National Indoor Arena in Birmingham. The event was televised on Bravo in the United Kingdom.

Rob Sinclair was also set to defend his lightweight title against Claes Beverlöv, though Beverlöv later pulled out due to injury and was replaced by fellow Swede Jani Lax. Lax would then withdraw on 22 September.

Results

Preliminary
Weight class				Method	Round	Time	Notes
Middleweight	Robert Devane	def	Colin Lewis	Submission (guillotine choke)	1	1:02
Welterweight	Tom Breese	def	Shah Hussein	Submission (rear naked choke)	2	2:57
Lightweight	Harvey Harra	def	David Round	Submission (guillotine choke)	2	1:18
Lightweight	Stuart Davies	def	Scott Jansen	Submission (armbar)	1	2:31
Main
Weight class				Method	Round	Time	Notes
Lightweight	AJ Wenn	def	Tim Newman	Submission (rear-naked choke)	2	1:21
Welterweight	Simeon Thoresen	def	Marco Santi	Submission (rear naked choke)	1	3:59
Welterweight	Gunnar Nelson	def	Eugene Fadiora	Submission (rear naked choke)	1	3:51
Catchweight (187 lbs)	John Phillips	def	James Zikic	TKO (punches)	1	1:34
Middleweight	Tom Watson	def	Alex Reid	Decision (unanimous)	5	5:00	For BAMMA Middleweight Championship

== BAMMA 5: Daley vs. Shira ==
BAMMA 5: Daley vs. Shira
- Promotion: British Association of Mixed Martial Arts
- Date: 26 February 2011
- Venue: MEN Arena
- City: Manchester, United Kingdom
- Attendance: 6,178

Event chronology
BAMMA 4	BAMMA 5: Daley vs. Shira	BAMMA 6

BAMMA 5: Daley vs. Shira was a mixed martial arts event held by the British Association of Mixed Martial Arts on 26 February 2011 at the MEN Arena in Manchester.

Background

BAMMA 5 was the first BAMMA event held outside of Birmingham or London. The event was originally scheduled to take place at the Metro Radio Arena in Newcastle on 4 December 2010 and headlined by a heavyweight bout between Stav Economou and Bob Sapp. However, due to snowstorms in the UK the event was cancelled.

It was then rescheduled for 26 February 2011 at the MEN Arena in Manchester. In January 2011, it was reported that Paul Daley was in advanced talks to headline the event. It was also reported by Scott Coker of Strikeforce that Paul Daley would only fight the winner of Nick Diaz and Evangelista Santos if he wins at BAMMA 5.

The main event was scheduled to award the vacant Welterweight title match but was changed to a non-title contest when Paul Daley failed to make the required weight by just 0.88 pounds (400 grams).

This event aired live on the UK TV channel SyFy, as part of a new TV deal. It was also broadcast live around the world on www.bammatv.com as an online stream pay per view, a first for the organization.

Results

Main Card
Weight class				Method	Round	Time	Notes
Welterweight	Paul Daley	def.	Yuya Shirai	KO (Punches)	1	1:46
Catchweight	Ricco Rodriguez	def.	James McSweeney	Decision (Unanimous)	3	5:00
Middleweight	Alex Makhonin	def.	Xavier Foupa-Pokam	TKO (Punches and Elbows)	2	4:48
Middleweight	Cláudio Henrique da Silva	def.	Jean-François Lenogue	Submission (Rear-Naked Choke)	1	2:51
Preliminary Card
Welterweight	Mohsen Bahari	def.	Leeroy Barnes	TKO (Punches)	1	0:40
Welterweight	Leigh Cohoon	def.	Rob Mills	TKO (Punches)	2	4:16
Lightweight	Jason Ball	def.	Peter Duncan	KO (Knees)	2	2:00
Welterweight	Michael Johnson	def.	Paul Cook	Decision (Unanimous)	3	5:00
Lightweight	Tim Newman	def.	Diego Vital	Decision (Split)	3	5:00
Lightweight	Costas Doru	def.	Liam James	Submission (Rear-Naked Choke)	1	2:47
Lightweight	Jeremy Petley	def.	Frankie Slater	Submission (Armbar)	1	0:36

== BAMMA 6: Watson vs. Rua ==
BAMMA 6: Watson vs. Rua
- Promotion: British Association of Mixed Martial Arts
- Date: 21 May 2011
- Venue: Wembley Arena
- City: London, United Kingdom
- Attendance: 6,417

Event chronology
BAMMA 5	BAMMA 6: Watson vs. Rua	BAMMA 7

BAMMA 6: Watson vs. Rua was a mixed martial arts event held by the British Association of Mixed Martial Arts on 21 May 2011 at the Wembley Arena in London.

Background

BAMMA 6 was announced during the television presentation of BAMMA 5. This was the first BAMMA event to be held at the Wembley Arena. Phil Baroni pulled out of a bout against Matt Ewin and Ivan Salaverry stepped in 3 weeks out.

BAMMA 6: Watson vs. Rua was named as the best event of 2011 at the UK MMA Awards.

Results

Main Card
Weight class				Method	Round	Time	Notes
Middleweight	Tom Watson (c)	def.	Murilo Rua	KO (Head Kick and Punches)	3	2:06	(Note: For the BAMMA World Middleweight Championship.)
Middleweight	Frank Trigg	def.	John Phillips	TKO (Doctor Stoppage)	1	2:41
Middleweight	Matt Ewin	def.	Ivan Salaverry	Decision (Unanimous)	3	5:00
Preliminary Card
Middleweight	Valentino Petrescu	def.	Joao Paulo de Souza	Decision (Majority)	3	5:00
Lightweight	Leonardo Santos	def.	Jason Ball	Decision (Unanimous)	3	5:00
Welterweight	Che Mills	def.	Marcio Cesar	KO (Punches)	1	3:58
Lightweight	Scott Jansen	def.	Craig Chesters	TKO (Punches)	2	0:50
Heavyweight	Catalin Zmarandescu	def.	Sharif Mohammed Ali	Submission (Front Choke)	1	0:32
Lightweight	Shane Omer	def.	Aaron Wilkinson	KO (Punches)	1	1:32
Welterweight	Sam Watling	def.	Leigh Cohoon	Decision (Unanimous)	3	5:00
Lightweight	Jeremy Petley	vs.	Costas Doru	Draw	3	5:00
Welterweight	Lee Taylor	def.	Kenny Moyston	TKO (Punches)	2	3:02
Light Heavyweight	Ryan White	def.	Fraser Opie	Submission (Guillotine Choke)	1	1:39
Welterweight	Murrey Fullerton	def.	Charles Scott	Submission (Armbar)	1	2:25

== BAMMA 7: Trigg vs. Wallhead ==
BAMMA 7: Trigg vs. Wallhead
- Promotion: British Association of Mixed Martial Arts
- Date: 10 September 2011
- Venue: NIA Arena
- City: Birmingham, United Kingdom

Event chronology
BAMMA 6	BAMMA 7: Trigg vs. Wallhead	BAMMA 8

BAMMA 7: Trigg vs. Wallhead was a mixed martial arts event held by the British Association of Mixed Martial Arts on 10 September 2011 at the NIA Arena in Birmingham.

Background

Tom Watson was originally set to defend his Middleweight Championship against Frank Trigg. However, on 9 August, it was announced that Watson had to pull out due to a back injury and was replaced with Jim Wallhead.

BAMMA held its first ever British Middleweight title fight to crown the first champion in their new British title division aimed at developing a British champion in each weight class.

Paul Daley fought Jordan Radev in his second BAMMA appearance. Daley ended up missing the welterweight weight limit by 6 pounds on the day of the weigh ins. The bout still went on at a catchweight of 176 pounds.

BAMMA will also hold its very first bantamweight bout with Erik Pérez vs. James Brum on the undercard.

Efraín Escudero was scheduled to face Tim Radcliffe in a lightweight bout. However, on 6 September, it was announced that visa issues prevented his travel to the United Kingdom.

Rob Sinclair was supposed to defend his World Lightweight Championship against Leonardo Santos. The bout, however, was canceled after Santos refused to fly to the event. Diego Vital stepped up on one day's notice to take the fight.

Results

Main Card
Weight class				Method	Round	Time	Notes
Middleweight	Jim Wallhead	def.	Frank Trigg	Decision (Split)	3	5:00
Catchweight (176 lb)	Paul Daley	def.	Jordan Radev	Decision (Unanimous)	3	5:00
Middleweight	Jack Marshman	def.	Carl Noon	TKO (Punches)	3	2:09	(Note: For the BAMMA Lonsdale Middleweight Championship.)
Lightweight	Andre Winner	def.	Jason Ball	Decision (Unanimous)	3	5:00
Lightweight	Rob Sinclair (c)	def.	Diego Vital	KO (Punch)	3	3:00	(Note: For the BAMMA Lightweight Championship.)
Preliminary Card
Lightweight	Dale Hardiman	def.	Scott Jansen	Submission (Rear-Naked Choke)	2	1:16
Lightweight	Chris Fishgold	def.	Jeremy Petley	Submission (Rear-Naked Choke)	1	4:33
Lightweight	Pindi Madahar	def.	Danny Compton	TKO (Punches)	2	1:06
Welterweight	Eugene Fadiora	def.	Robert Devane	Submission (Rear-Naked Choke)	1	4:55
Welterweight	Tom Breese	def.	Lee Taylor	Submission (Rear-Naked Choke)	1	2:26
Welterweight	Dean Amasinger	def.	Shahid Hussain	Decision (Unanimous)	3	5:00
Light Heavyweight	Fraser Opie	def.	Robert Krecicki	TKO (Punches)	1	3:19
Bantamweight	Erik Pérez	def.	James Brum	Technical Submission (Rear-Naked Choke)	1	3:31

== BAMMA 8: Manuwa vs. Rea ==
BAMMA 8: Manuwa vs Rea
- Promotion: British Association of Mixed Martial Arts
- Date: 10 December 2011
- Venue: Capital FM Arena
- City: Nottingham

Event chronology
BAMMA 7	BAMMA 8: Manuwa vs Rea	BAMMA 9

BAMMA 8: Manuwa vs. Rea was a mixed martial arts event held by the British Association of Mixed Martial Arts (BAMMA) on 10 December 2011, at the Capital FM Arena in Nottingham.

Background

This event was meant to hold the BAMMA debut of Nate Marquardt, but it has been pushed back to 2012 and will be against Yoshiyuki Yoshida. Marquardt has shown his desire for his opponent to be UFC, Cage Rage, Strikeforce and BAMMA veteran Paul Daley. Daley, however, later decided not to take the fight, citing that between having already competed 5 times in 2011 from 21 October and being such a high-stakes fight, it was in his best interest to look have his next fight in 2012 so he can rest up and work out a gameplan against Marquardt.

UCMMA Light Heavyweight Champion Jimi Manuwa has signed a four-fight deal with BAMMA and made his promotional debut on this show.

UFC Hall of Fame member and MMA legend Randy Couture will be appearing at BAMMA 8 to meet fans and sign copies of his new book 'The Last Round'.

Andre Winner was slated to fight Niko Puhakka in a lightweight title eliminator. However Puhakka was pulled from the card and replaced by Diego Gonzalez.

Results

Main Card
Weight class				Method	Round	Time	Notes
Light Heavyweight	Jimi Manuwa	def.	Antony Rea	TKO (Retirement)	1	5:00
Welterweight	Jim Wallhead	def.	Joey Villasenor	KO (Punches)	1	0:48
Lightweight	Andre Winner	def.	Diego González	Decision (Unanimous)	3	5:00
Bantamweight	Erik Pérez	def.	Paul McVeigh	Decision (Unanimous)	3	5:00
Preliminary Card
Middleweight	Jack Marshman (c)	def.	Leeroy Barnes	Decision (Unanimous)	3	5:00	(Note: For the BAMMA Lonsdale Middleweight Championship.)
Lightweight	Curt Warburton	def.	Tim Newman	Decision (Unanimous)	3	5:00
Lightweight	Colin Fletcher	def.	David Round	Submission (Guillotine Choke)	1	2:13
Welterweight	Tom Breese	def.	Qasim Shafiq	Submission (Triangle Choke)	1	4:20
Welterweight	Danny Mitchell	def.	Dean Amasinger	Submission (Flying Triangle Choke)	2	2:28
Bantamweight	Brent Crawley	def.	Mark Platts	Submission (Rear-Naked Choke)	1	2:57
Flyweight	Brian Hyslop	def.	Ian Malone	Decision (Unanimous)	3	5:00

== BAMMA 9: Watson vs. Marshman ==
BAMMA 9: Watson vs. Marshman
- Promotion: British Association of Mixed Martial Arts
- Date: 24 March 2012
- Venue: National Indoor Arena (NIA)
- City: Birmingham

Event chronology
BAMMA 8	BAMMA 9: Watson vs. Marshman	BAMMA 10

BAMMA 9: Watson vs. Marshman was a mixed martial arts event held by the British Association of Mixed Martial Arts (BAMMA) on 24 March 2012, at the National Indoor Arena in Birmingham.

Background

Marshman became the first Welsh mixed martial artist to headline a major MMA event.

This event was due to be held on 11 February 2012, at the LG Arena in Birmingham but was moved to 24 March 2012 at the National Indoor Arena in Birmingham due to unforeseen circumstances.

Nate Marquardt was due to headline the main event however this is no longer the case since he mutually cancelled his BAMMA contract.

BAMMA 9 aired on a week's delay on Extreme Sports Channel in the UK (Channel 419 on Sky and Channel 527 on Virgin).

Sam Hooker and Rus Smith were expected to fight on the card, however due to injuries they were replaced by Luke Barnatt and Lewis Long respectively.

Results

Preliminary
Weight class				Method	Round	Time	Notes
Lightweight	Jake Murphy	def	David Round	Submission (rear naked choke)	2	1:40
Light Heavyweight	Rab Truesdale	def	Sam Mensah	TKO (elbows)	1	4:32
Middleweight	Luke Barnatt	def	Lee Johnson	Submission (rear naked choke)	1	2:36
Heavyweight	Mark Godbeer	def	Catalin Zmarandescu	TKO (corner stoppage)	1	5:00
Lightweight	Dale Hardiman	def	Antanas Jazbutis	Decision (unanimous)	3	5:00
Welterweight	Leeroy Barnes	def	Matt Ewin	Submission (guillotine choke)	2	4:57
Middleweight	Patrick Vallee	def	Andrew Punshon	Submission (armbar)	2	2:16
Main
Weight class				Method	Round	Time	Notes
Welterweight	Tom Breese	def	Mark Tucker	TKO (knees)	2	1:40
Light Heavyweight	Jason Jones	def	Przemyslaw Mysiala	TKO (cuts)	1	3:51
Lightweight	Colin Fletcher	def	Jason Ball	Decision (unanimous)	3	5:00
Middleweight	Tom Watson	def	Jack Marshman	TKO (punches and elbows)	2	4:50	For BAMMA World Middleweight Championship

== BAMMA 10: Sinclair vs. Winner ==
BAMMA 10: Sinclair vs. Winner
- Promotion: British Association of Mixed Martial Arts
- Date: 15 September 2012
- Venue: Wembley Arena
- City: London
- Attendance: 12,333
- Total gate: $999,566
- Buyrate: 780,990

Event chronology
BAMMA 9	BAMMA 10: Sinclair vs. Winner	BAMMA 11

BAMMA 10: Sinclair vs. Winner was a mixed martial arts event held by the British Association of Mixed Martial Arts (BAMMA) on 15 September 2012, at Wembley Arena in London.

Background

This will mark the first mixed martial arts event to be part of a ground-breaking deal with Channel 5. The event will air live on Channel 5's sister channel – 5*, and then the following week a highlights package will be shown on Channel 5.

On 11 July, BAMMA announced that the main event will have Rob Sinclair defending his World Lightweight title against The Ultimate Fighter: United States vs. United Kingdom finalist and UFC veteran Andre Winner.

One 20 July, BAMMA announced the co-main event bout, which will have Jack Marshman defending his British Middleweight title against Andrew Punshon.

Fight Card

Preliminary
Weight class				Method	Round	Time	Notes
Lightweight	Marc Allen	def	Lee Taylor	Decision (split)	3	5:00
Light Heavyweight	Max Nunes	def	Tony Moran	Submission (triangle choke)	1	2:58
Light Heavyweight	Sam Mensah	def	Mike Neun	KO (punch)	1	0:08
Lightweight	Jeremy Petley	def	Dyson Roberts	Submission (rear naked choke)	2	4:45
Lightweight	Tommy Maguire	def	Antanas Jazbutis	Decision (unanimous)	3	5:00
Welterweight	Tom Breese	def	Jack Magee	Submission (triangle choke)	1	3:19
Lightweight	Curt Warburton	def	Lee Wieczorek	Decision (unanimous)	3	5:00
Main
Weight class				Method	Round	Time	Notes
Middleweight	Denniston Sutherland	def	Leeroy Barnes	Decision (unanimous)	3	5:00
Middleweight	Jack Marshman	def	Andrew Punshon	Submission (triangle choke)	1	2:31	For BAMMA British Middleweight Championship for Punshon only, Marshman came in overweight so title was made vacant after he won.
Lightweight	Rob Sinclair	def	Andre Winner	Decision (split) (47–48, 49–46, 48–47)	5	5:00	For BAMMA World Lightweight Championship

== BAMMA 11: Marshman vs. Foupa-Pokam ==
BAMMA 11: Marshman vs. Foupa-Pokam
- Promotion: British Association of Mixed Martial Arts
- Date: 1 December 2012
- Venue: National Indoor Arena
- City: Birmingham

Event chronology
BAMMA 10	BAMMA 11: Marshman vs. Foupa-Pokam	BAMMA 12

BAMMA 11: Marshman vs. Foupa-Pokam was a mixed martial arts event held by the British Association of Mixed Martial Arts (BAMMA) on 1 December 2012, at National Indoor Arena in Birmingham.

Background

Alex Reid is set to return to BAMMA at this event.

This event will also crown the first BAMMA British Welterweight Champion and the first British Lightweight Champion.

UCMMA Light Heavyweight champion Linton Vassell was scheduled to face Jason Jones at this event as the co-main event, but Vassell had to pull out due to injury.

The event made history in the UK as the first MMA event to have been shown live on terrestrial television. However, there has been controversy over the layout of the event in the one-hour timeframe. On Channel 5, the only fight to have been shown live was Alex Reid vs Sam Boo, and then highlights of what was supposed to have been the main event, Jack Marshman vs. Xavier Foupa-Pokam. Reid had not fought for over a year by this point and admitted going into the fight that he was very rusty and had not been training properly until September, and this reflected in the fight as it was described by The Mirror as scrappy, at times it was dirty (both men were deducted points for fouls during the bout) and slow-paced. Overall many critics and fans felt that it was the wrong fight to present as the historic first live fight on Channel 5.

Fight Card

Preliminary
Weight class				Method	Round	Time	Notes
Light Heavyweight	Mike Neun	def.	Thomas Denham	TKO (punches and elbows)	3	3:58
Bantamweight	Dawid Farycki	def.	Bryan Creighton	TKO (punches)	2	4:25
Welterweight	Leon Edwards	def.	Jonathan Bilton	TKO (knees)	2	1:11
Middleweight	Yannick Bahati	def.	Ben Constatine	Decision (unanimous)	3	5:00
Featherweight	Andrew Fisher	def.	Andy Green	TKO (elbows)	1	2:26
Lightweight	Marc Allen	def.	Kyle Redfearn	Decision (split)	3	5:00
Lightweight	Jeremy Petley	def.	Richie Downes	Decision (unanimous)	3	5:00
Bantamweight	James Doolan	def.	Spencer Hewitt	Submission (triangle choke)	1	1:42
Light Heavyweight	Marcin Lazarz	Sam Mensah	Submission (armbar)	1	4:16
Light Heavyweight	Max Nunes	def.	Kevin Thompson	TKO (punches)	1	1:40
Main
Weight class				Method	Round	Time	Notes
Lightweight	Steven Ray	def.	Dale Hardiman	Decision (Unanimous)	3	5:00	For 1st BAMMA British Lightweight Championship
Welterweight	Tom Breese	def.	Warren Kee	Submission (rear-naked choke)	1	3:06	For 1st BAMMA British Welterweight Championship
Middleweight	Alex Reid	def.	Sam Boo	Decision (unanimous)	3	5:00
Middleweight	Xavier Foupa-Pokam	def.	Jack Marshman	Decision (split)	3	5:00

== BAMMA 12: Wallhead vs. Veach ==
BAMMA 12: Wallhead vs. Veach
- Promotion: British Association of Mixed Martial Arts
- Date: 9 March 2013
- Venue: Metro Radio Arena
- City: Newcastle upon Tyne

Event chronology
BAMMA 11	BAMMA 12: Wallhead vs. Veach	BAMMA 13

BAMMA 12: Wallhead vs. Veach was a mixed martial arts event held by the British Association of Mixed Martial Arts (BAMMA) on 9 March 2013, at Metro Radio Arena in Newcastle upon Tyne.

Background

Results

Preliminary
Weight class				Method	Round	Time	Notes
Bantamweight	James MacAllister	def.	Steve McCombe	Submission (rear-naked choke)	2	3:08
Heavyweight	Mahmood Besharate	def.	Steven Gardener	Unanimous decision	3	5:00
Light Heavyweight	Tom Denham	def.	Brett McDermott	Submission (rear-naked choke)	2	3:58
Middleweight	Leeroy Barnes	def.	Steve Watson	Submission (guillotine choke)	1	0:47
Middleweight	Scott Askham	def.	Harry McLeman	Submission (rear-naked choke)	3	4:13
Lightweight	Ryan Scope	def.	Luke Newman	Submission (triangle choke)	1	4:00
Main
Weight class				Method	Round	Time	Notes
Lightweight	Curt Warburton	def.	Stevie Ray (c)	Unanimous decision	5	5:00	For BAMMA British Lightweight Championship
Light Heavyweight	Max Nunes	def.	Marcin Lazarz	TKO (punches)	3	1:12
Welterweight	Jim Wallhead	def.	Matt Veach	Submission (rear naked choke)	1	3:05

== BAMMA 13: Night of Champions ==
BAMMA 13: Night of Champions
- Promotion: British Association of Mixed Martial Arts
- Date: 14 September 2013
- Venue: National Indoor Arena
- City: Birmingham

Event chronology
BAMMA 12	BAMMA 13: Night of Champions	BAMMA 14

BAMMA 13: Night of Champions was a mixed martial arts event held by the British Association of Mixed Martial Arts (BAMMA) on 14 September 2013, at National Indoor Arena in Birmingham.

Background

The event crowned the promotion's first World Light Heavyweight and World Welterweight champions as well as crowned a new World Lightweight Champion, which mas made vacant by Rob Sinclair when he signed to Bellator MMA. Max Nunes faced Jason Jones for the Light Heavyweight title, Jim Wallhead took on Eddy Ellis for the Welterweight title & Curt Warburton faced off against Mansour Barnaoui for the Lightweight title.

After a short stint in the UFC, Colin Fletcher returned to BAMMA at this event for a bout against Tim Newman.

Results

Preliminary
Weight class				Method	Round	Time	Notes
Lightweight	Jefferson George	def.	Mariusz Marzec	Submission (rear naked choke)	2	4:37
Lightweight	Tim Wilde	def.	Stephen Martin	Decision (unanimous)	3	5:00
Middleweight	Harry McLeman	def.	Matt Hallam	Submission (guillotine choke)	2	0:48
Flyweight	Rany Saadeh	def.	Danny Missin	TKO (knees)	2	4:13
Flyweight	Mahmood Besharate	def.	Joe Laurence	Decision (unanimous)	3	5:00
Welterweight	Leon Edwards	def.	Adam Boussif	Submission (arm triangle choke)	1	2:10
Middleweight	Ion Pascu	def.	Jack Marshman	KO (punches)	1	4:08
Middleweight	Scott Askham	def.	Jorge Luis Bezerra	Decision (unanimous)	3	5:00	For vacant BAMMA World Middleweight Championship
Main
Weight class				Method	Round	Time	Notes
Lightweight	Colin Fletcher	def.	Tim Newman	Decision (unanimous)	3	5:00
Lightweight	Mansour Barnaoui	def.	Curt Warburton	TKO (punches and elbows)	1	4:08	For vacant BAMMA World Lightweight Championship
Welterweight	Eddy Ellis	def.	Jim Wallhead	Decision (split)	3	5:00	For 1st BAMMA World Welterweight Championship
Light Heavyweight	Jason Jones	def.	Max Nunes	Submission (arm triangle choke)	2	3:50	For 1st BAMMA World Light Heavyweight Championship

== BAMMA 14: Daley vs. da Silva ==
BAMMA 14: Daley Vs. da Silva
- Promotion: British Association of Mixed Martial Arts
- Date: 14 December 2013
- Venue: LG Arena
- City: Birmingham

Event chronology
BAMMA 13	BAMMA 14: Daley Vs. da Silva	BAMMA 15

BAMMA 14: Daley vs. da Silva was a mixed martial arts event held by the British Association of Mixed Martial Arts (BAMMA) on 14 December 2013, at LG Arena in Birmingham.

Background Paul Daley made his return to BAMMA at this event with a KO victory against Romário Manoel da Silva, and Mansour Barnaoui defended his lightweight title for the first time when he defeated Colin Fletcher.

Scott Askham was scheduled to defend his Middleweight Championship against Ion Pascu, but had to withdraw due to an injury. Max Nunes dropped weight and was announced as the replacement to face Pascu in a Middleweight bout.

Results

Preliminary
Weight class				Method	Round	Time	Notes
Bantamweight	Ed Arthur	def.	Ben Rees	TKO	1	5:00
Middleweight	Matt Hallam	def.	Curtis Widmer	TKO	1	2:15
Welterweight	Tim Menzies	def.	James Samuda	TKO	3	3:16
Lightweight	Tim Wilde	def.	Jefferson George	TKO (doctor stoppage)	1	3:42
Featherweight	Andy Craven	def.	Zi Shah	Submission (heel hoke)	1	0:37
Middleweight	Harry McLeman	def.	Matt Howard	Decision (unanimous)	3	5:00
Welterweight	Leon Edwards	def.	Wendle Lewis	KO	1	1:20
Featherweight	Tom Duquesnoy	def.	James Saville	TKO	2	4:04
Welterweight	Wayne Murrie	def.	Michael Johnson	Submission (rear naked choke)	1	3:23	For Vacant BAMMA British Welterweight Championship
Main
Weight class				Method	Round	Time	Notes
Middleweight	Max Nunes	def.	Ion Pascu	Decision (unanimous)	3	5:00
Welterweight	Jim Wallhead	def.	Florent Betorangal	KO (takedown)	3	0:21
Lightweight	Mansour Barnaoui (c)	def.	Colin Fletcher	Submission (rear naked choke)	1	4:00	For BAMMA World Lightweight Championship
Welterweight	Paul Daley	def.	Romário Manoel Da Silva	KO (punch)	2	1:42

== BAMMA 15: Thompson vs. Selmani ==
BAMMA 15: Thompson Vs. Selmani
- Promotion: British Association of Mixed Martial Arts
- Date: 5 April 2014
- Venue: Copper Box Arena
- City: London

Event chronology
#BAMMA 14	BAMMA 15: Thompson Vs. Selmani	#BAMMA Fight Night 1

BAMMA 15: Thompson vs. Selmani was a mixed martial arts event held by the British Association of Mixed Martial Arts (BAMMA) on 5 April 2014, at the Copper Box Arena in London.

Fight Card

Preliminary
Weight class				Method	Round	Time	Notes
Bantamweight	Ed Arthur	def.	Nathaniel Wood	Submission (rear naked choke)	3	1:48
Welterweight	Jacek Toczydlowski	def.	Benny Carr	Submission (strikes)	1	1:32
Welterweight	Alex Montagnani	def.	Nathan Jones	Submission (rear naked choke)	1	2:43
Featherweight	Andy Craven	def.	Richard Edwards	Submission (rear naked choke)	1	2:12
Lightweight	Jefferson George	def.	Jack Grant	Decision (split)	3	5:00
Flyweight	Rany Saadeh	def.	Mahmood Besharate	Decision (unanimous)	3	5:00
Welterweight	Ryan Scope	def.	Ali Arish	Decision (unanimous)	3	5:00
Main
Weight class				Method	Round	Time	Notes
Middleweight	Harry McLeman	def.	Andy De Vent	Decision (unanimous)	3	5:00	For The Vacant BAMMA British Middleweight Championship
Featherweight	Tom Duquesnoy	def.	Teddy Violet	Submission (triangle choke)	2	1:23	For The Vacant BAMMA World Featherweight Championship
Lightweight	Colin Fletcher	def.	Tony Hervey	Decision (split)	3	5:00
Welterweight	Leon Edwards	def.	Wayne Murray (c)	Submission (rear naked choke)	1	3:13	For the BAMMA British Welterweight Championship
Heavyweight	Gzim Selmani	def.	Oli Thompson	Technical Submission (guillotine choke)	1	0:18

== BAMMA Fight Night: Southampton ==
BAMMA Fight Night: Southampton
- Promotion: British Association of Mixed Martial Arts
- Date: 7 June 2014
- Venue: O2 Guildhall
- City: Southampton

Event chronology
BAMMA 15	BAMMA Fight Night: Southampton	BAMMA Fight Night: Liverpool

BAMMA Fight Night: Southampton was a mixed martial arts event held by the British Association of Mixed Martial Arts (BAMMA) on 7 June 2014, at the O2 Guildhall in Southampton.

It is the first Fight Night in a series of events intended to bring the BAMMA franchise to smaller cities and towns across the UK, the shows will give contracted fighters more opportunities to compete in addition to developing more localised talent.

Fight Card

Preliminary
Weight class				Method	Round	Time	Notes
Middleweight	Damien Koryga	def.	Ricky Mitchell	Submission (guillotine choke)	2	1:35
Featherweight	Josh Row	def.	Andy Hannon	Decision (unanimous)	3	5:00
Middleweight	Marcus Mitchell	def.	Nick Jones	TKO (strikes)	1	1:49
Main Card
Weight class				Method	Round	Time	Notes
Catchweight	Artem Kotov	def.	Alexei Roberts	TKO (strikes)	1	1:04
Bantamweight	Ed Arthur	def.	Michael Cutting	Submission (rear naked choke)	2	1:58
Featherweight	Ashleigh Grimshaw	def.	Dragan Pesic	Submission (arm triangle choke)	1	3:35
Welterweight	Alex Montagnani	def.	Tim Menzies	KO (flying knee)	1	1:28
Middleweight	Scott Askham (c)	def.	Max Nunes	TKO (strikes)	3	1:30	For the BAMMA World Middleweight Championship

== BAMMA Fight Night: Liverpool ==
BAMMA Fight Night: Liverpool
- Promotion: British Association of Mixed Martial Arts
- Date: 2 August 2014
- Venue: The Liverpool Olympia
- City: Liverpool

Event chronology
BAMMA Fight Night: Southampton	BAMMA Fight Night: Liverpool	BAMMA 16

BAMMA Fight Night: Liverpool was a mixed martial arts event that was held by the British Association of Mixed Martial Arts (BAMMA) on 2 August 2014, at the Liverpool Olympia.

It is the second Fight Night event scheduled to be held by the BAMMA franchise.

Fight Card

Preliminary
Weight class				Method	Round	Time	Notes
Lightweight	Anthony O'Connor	def.	Beau Gavin	Submission (rear naked choke)	2	0:57
Lightweight	Tim Barnett	def.	Dion Wyton	TKO (submission to punches)	1	2:19
Middleweight	Igor Puskarsis	def.	Lee Williams	Decision (unanimous)	3	5:00
Featherweight	Ben Dearden	def.	James Reece	Submission (armbar)	2	2:59
Welterweight	Jai Herbert	def.	Mick Stanton	Submission (rear naked choke)	3	2:34
Flyweight	Mike Berry	def.	Danny Missin	Submission (rear naked choke)	1	3:45
Lightweight	Greg Severs	def.	Jamie Reynolds	Decision (unanimous)	3	5:00
Bantamweight	Michael Cutting	def.	Richard Edwards	Submission (armbar)	2	4:20
Main
Weight class				Method	Round	Time	Notes
Welterweight	Tim Menzies	def.	Nathan Jones	Decision (majority)	3	5:00
Flyweight	Pietro Menga	def.	Steve McCombe	Submission (rear naked choke)	2	1:00
Featherweight	Shay Walsh	def.	James Saville	Decision (unanimous)	3	5:00
Flyweight	Rany Saadeh	def.	Jody Collins	Decision (unanimous)	3	5:00	For the inaugural BAMMA Flyweight Championship
Middleweight	Ion Pascu	def.	Lee Chadwick	Decision (unanimous)	3	5:00

== BAMMA 16: Daley vs. da Rocha ==
BAMMA 16
- Promotion: British Association of Mixed Martial Arts
- Date: 13 September 2014
- Venue: Victoria Warehouse
- City: Manchester

Event chronology
BAMMA Fight Night: Liverpool	BAMMA 16	BAMMA 17

BAMMA 16 was a mixed martial arts event held by the British Association of Mixed Martial Arts (BAMMA) on 14 September 2014.

Fight Card

Preliminary Card
Weight class				Method	Round	Time	Notes
Featherweight	Rob Zabitis	def.	James Winstanley	Decision (unanimous)	3	5:00
Lightweight	Tim Barnett	def.	Joe Naraynsingh	TKO	1	2:09
Flyweight	Javonne Morrison	def.	Callum McVay	TKO	2	1:09
Welterweight	Igor Puskarskis	def.	Alex Cossey	Submission (triangle choke)	2	1:54
Welterweight	Sam Ferguson	def.	James Bray	TKO	1	1:10
Featherweight	Mike Grundy	def.	Anthony Phillips	Submission (D'arce choke)	1	2:47
Lightweight	Marc Diakiese	def.	Jefferson George	Decision (unanimous)	3	5:00
Middleweight	Andy De-Vent	def.	Roggy Lawson	TKO	3	1:44
Featherweight	Shay Walsh	def.	Paul Reed	Decision (unanimous)	3	5:00
Main
Weight class				Method	Round	Time	Notes
Bantamweight	Mike Wootten	def.	Antoine Gallinaro	Submission (rear naked choke)	2	4:55
Lightweight	Alexei Roberts	def.	Jack Grant	Decision (unanimous)	3	5:00
Welterweight	Leon Edwards (c)	def.	Shaun Taylor	KO (punch)	3	3:30	For the BAMMA British Welterweight Championship
Featherweight	Tom Duquesnoy (c)	vs.	Ashleigh Grimshaw	No Contest (accidental kick to the groin)			For the BAMMA World Featherweight Championship
Welterweight	Paul Daley	def.	Marinho Moreira da Rocha	KO (punch to the body)	2	3:40

== BAMMA 17: Fletcher vs. Brightmon ==
BAMMA 17
- Promotion: British Association of Mixed Martial Arts
- Date: 6 December 2014
- Venue: Victoria Warehouse
- City: Manchester

Event chronology
BAMMA 16	BAMMA 17	BAMMA 18

BAMMA 17 was a mixed martial arts event held by the British Association of Mixed Martial Arts (BAMMA) on 6 December 2014.

Fight Card

Preliminary Card
Weight class				Method	Round	Time	Notes
Featherweight	Paul Douglas	def.	Borys Feldman	Submission (rear naked choke)	1	2:28
Featherweight	Mike Grundy	def.	Michael Cutting	Submission (brabo choke)	1	1:56
Bantamweight	Regis Sugden	def.	Paul Bentley	TKO (punches)	2	0:38
Lightweight	Marc Diakiese	def.	Vernon O'Neil	Decision (unanimous)	3	5:00
Middleweight	Conor Cooke	def.	Lee Chadwick	Decision (unanimous)	3	5:00
Flyweight	Gareth Pilot	def.	Dino Gambatesa	Submission (rear naked choke)	1	3:08
Bantamweight	Mike Wootten	def.	Peter Ligier	Decision (unanimous)	3	5:00
Main
Weight class				Method	Round	Time	Notes
Featherweight	Greg Severs	def.	Andy Craven	Decision (unanimous)	3	5:00
Featherweight	Brendan Loughnane	def.	Florian Rousseau	TKO (punches)	1	4:48
Heavyweight	Brett McDermott	def.	Oli Thompson	KO (punches)	1	1:43
Lightweight	Martin Stapleton	def.	Sebastian Fournier	Submission (rear naked choke)	1	3:44
Lightweight	Colin Fletcher	def.	Michael Brightmon	TKO (corner stoppage)	2	5:00

== BAMMA 18: Duquesnoy vs. Klaczek ==
BAMMA 18
- Promotion: British Association of Mixed Martial Arts
- Date: 21 February 2015
- Venue: Wolverhampton Civic Hall
- City: Wolverhampton

Event chronology
BAMMA 17	BAMMA 18	BAMMA 19

BAMMA 18 was a mixed martial arts event held by the British Association of Mixed Martial Arts (BAMMA) on 21 February 2015.

Fight Card

Preliminary Card
Weight class				Method	Round	Time	Notes
Lightweight	Nathan Clayton	def.	Josh Abraham	KO (punch)	1	1:45
Light Heavyweight	Tom Aspinall	def.	Ricky King	Submission (heel hoke)	1	0:49
Bantamweight	Regis Sugden	def.	Manuel Bilic	Submission (triangle choke)	1	4:18
Featherweight	Mike Grundy	def.	Mamadou Gueye	Submission (brabo choke)	1	3:35
Flyweight	Chris Miah	def.	Mick Gerrard	KO (punch)	2	4:37
Main Card
Weight class				Method	Round	Time	Notes
Bantamweight	Michael Cutting	def.	Nathaniel Wood	Submission (armbar)	1	3:26
Heavyweight	Artur Gluchowski	def.	Stuart Austin	Decision (split)	3	5:00
Middleweight	Cheick Kone	def.	Chris Fields	TKO (punches)	1	0:23
Lightweight	Alexei Roberts	def.	Hayden Critchfield	TKO (punches)	2	2:19
Featherweight	Tom Duquesnoy (c)	def.	Krzysztof Klaczek	TKO (body kick & punches)	3	1:37	For the BAMMA World Featherweight Championship

== BAMMA 19: Stapleton vs. Petley ==
BAMMA 19
- Promotion: British Association of Mixed Martial Arts
- Date: 28 March 2015
- Venue: Winter Gardens
- City: Blackpool

Event chronology
BAMMA 18	BAMMA 19	BAMMA 20

BAMMA 19 was a mixed martial arts event held by the British Association of Mixed Martial Arts (BAMMA) on 28 March 2015.

Fight Card

Preliminary Card
Weight class				Method	Round	Time	Notes
Heavyweight	Tom Aspinall	def.	Satish Jamia	TKO (punches)	1	0:09
Featherweight	Damian Stasiak	def.	Mike Grundy	Submission (triangle choke)	2	4:18
Lightweight	Lewis Monarch	def.	David Johnson	TKO (punches)	1	0:09
Welterweight	Nathan Jones	def.	Oskar Somerfeld	Submission (triangle choke)	1	1:40
Lightweight	Damian Frankiewicz	def.	Paul Douglas	Submission (rear naked choke)	3	4:02
Heavyweight	Mark Godbeer	def.	Thomas Denham	TKO (punches)	1	1:33
Main Card
Weight class				Method	Round	Time	Notes
Featherweight	Brendan Loughnane	def.	Steve Polifonte	Decision (unanimous)	3	5:00
Heavyweight	Kamil Bazelak	def.	Karl Etherington	TKO (punches)	1	4:13
Middleweight	Andy De-Vent	def.	Conor Cooke	Submission (rear naked choke)	1		For the BAMMA Lonsdale British Middleweight Championship
Lightweight	Marc Diakiese	def.	Jack McGann	Decision (unanimous)	3	5:00	For the BAMMA Lonsdale British Lightweight Championship
Lightweight	Martin Stapleton	def.	Jeremy Petley	TKO (head kick)	3	0:23

== BAMMA 20: Lazarz vs. McDermott ==
BAMMA 20
- Promotion: British Association of Mixed Martial Arts
- Date: 25 April 2015
- Venue: Barclaycard Arena
- City: West Midlands
- Attendance: 15,234
- Total gate: $2,444,980
- Buyrate: 1,000,001

Event chronology
BAMMA 19	BAMMA 20	BAMMA 21

BAMMA 20 was a mixed martial arts event held by the British Association of Mixed Martial Arts (BAMMA) on 25 April 2015. Rany Saadeh was scheduled to defend his BAMMA Flyweight Championship again Chris Miah, but 4 days before the event Saadeh got an infection and was not medically cleared by doctors to compete. Spanish fighter Daniel Barez stepped in on short notice and fought against Miah in a non-title bout.

Fight Card

Preliminary Card
Weight class				Method	Round	Time	Notes
Welterweight	Oliver Paske	def.	Arthur Jakub	Submission (guillotine choke)	1	2:18
Featherweight	Aiden Lee	def.	Adam Jahovic	Decision (unanimous)	3	5:00
Lightweight	Harry Marple	def.	Chris Astley	Submission (Japanese necktie)	2	1:41
Bantamweight	Regis Sugden	def.	Ant Phillips	TKO (punches)	1	3:51
Featherweight	Chase Morton	def.	Wayne Drake	TKO (punches)	1	4:07
Welterweight	Jack Grant	def.	Warren Kee	KO (punches)	1	1:04
Lightweight	Rick Selvarajah	def.	Jefferson George	Decision (split)	3	5:00
Main Card
Weight class				Method	Round	Time	Notes
Flyweight	Chris Miah	def.	Daniel Barez	Submission (rear naked choke)	2	1:46
Bantamweight	Ed Arthur	def.	Alan Philpott	Submission (rear naked choke)	2	0:56	For the Inaugural BAMMA World Bantamweight Championship
Lightweight	Andre Winner	def.	Colin Fletcher	Decision (unanimous)	3	5:00
Light Heavyweight	Marcin Lazarz	def.	Brett McDermott	Decision (unanimous)	3	5:00	For the Vacant BAMMA World Light Heavyweight Championship

== BAMMA 21: DeVent vs. Kone ==
BAMMA 21
- Promotion: British Association of Mixed Martial Arts
- Date: 13 June 2015
- Venue: Barclaycard Arena
- City: West Midlands

Event chronology
BAMMA 20	BAMMA 21	BAMMA 22

BAMMA 21: DeVent Vs. Kone was a mixed martial arts event held by the British Association of Mixed Martial Arts (BAMMA) on 13 June 2015.

Fight Card

Preliminary Card
Weight class				Method	Round	Time	Notes
Welterweight	Ben Bennett	def.	Daniel Cassell	Submission (triangle choke)	1	2:59
Lightweight	Mateusz Figlak	def.	Nathan Clayton	Decision (unanimous)	3	5:00
Flyweight	Jamie Powell	def.	Arnaud Dos Santos	Submission (rear naked choke)	2	3:32
Lightweight	Mike Grundy	def.	Damian Frankiewicz	Submission (arm triangle choke)	1	3:59
Heavyweight	Thomas Denham	def.	Ashley Pollard	KO (punches)	1	0:52
Lightweight	Tobias Reid	def.	Wayne Drake	TKO (punches)	1	1:27
Heavyweight	Stuart Austin	def.	Tom Aspinall	Submission (heel hook)	2	3:59
Welterweight	Harry Marple	def.	Sergiu Berdila	KO (knee)	1	1:23
Bantamweight	Shay Walsh	def.	Gaz Pilot	TKO (punches)	3	3:44
Main Card
Weight class				Method	Round	Time	Notes
Lightweight	Jack McGann	def.	Aziz Stringer	TKO (punches)	1	2:08
Lightweight	Rob Sinclair	def.	Michael Brightmon	TKO (punches)	1	3:37
Heavyweight	Mark Godbeer	def.	Paul Taylor	TKO (retirement)	2	4:43	For the Inaugural BAMMA World Heavyweight Championship
Middleweight	Cheick Kone	def.	Andy DeVent	TKO (knees & punches)	1	3:57	For the Vacant BAMMA World Middleweight Championship

== BAMMA 22: Duquesnoy vs. Loughnane ==
BAMMA 22
- Promotion: British Association of Mixed Martial Arts
- Date: 19 September 2015
- Venue: 3 Arena
- City: Dublin, Ireland

Event chronology
BAMMA 21	BAMMA 22	BAMMA 23

BAMMA 22: Duquesnoy vs. Loughnane was a mixed martial arts event held by the British Association of Mixed Martial Arts (BAMMA) on 19 September 2015.

Fight Card

Preliminary Card
Weight class				Method	Round	Time	Notes
Bantamweight	Dylan Tuke	def.	Adam Caffrey	Submission (rear naked choke)	1	3;27
Welterweight	Rhys McKee	def.	John Redmond	Submission (rear naked choke)	1	1:38
Heavyweight	Łukasz Parobiec	def.	Johnny Dargan	TKO (punches)	1	3:27
Bantamweight	Frans Mlambo	def.	Darren O'Gorman	TKO (punches)	1	2:45
Women's Bantamweight	Sinead Kavanagh	def.	Hatice Ozyurt	TKO (punches)	1	0:17
Lightweight	Kane Mousah	def.	Myles Price	Decision (unanimous)	3	5:00
Lightweight	Marc Diakiese	def.	Rick Selvarajah	TKO (punches)	1	0:24	For the BAMMA Lonsdale British Featherweight Championship
Middleweight	Paul Byrne	def.	Conor Cooke	TKO (punches)	1	2:06
Lightweight	Jack McGann	def.	Jack Grant	TKO (punches)	1	0:52
Main Card
Weight class				Method	Round	Time	Notes
Women's Atomweight	Celine Haga	def.	Catherine Costigan	Submission (arm bar)	1	4:46
Bantamweight	Alan Philpott	def.	Regis Sugden	Decision (split)	3	5:00	For the Inaugural BAMMA Lonsdale British Bantamweight Championship
Middleweight	Christopher Jacquelin	def.	Chris Fields	Submission (triangle choke)	2	4:55
Featherweight	Tom Duquesnoy (c)	def.	Brendan Loughnane	Decision (split)	3	5:00	For the BAMMA World Featherweight Championship

== BAMMA 23: Night of Champions ==
BAMMA 23
- Promotion: British Association of Mixed Martial Arts
- Date: 14 November 2015
- Venue: Barclaycard Arena
- City: Birmingham, England

Event chronology
BAMMA 22	BAMMA 23	BAMMA 24

BAMMA 23: Night of Champions was a mixed martial arts event held by the British Association of Mixed Martial Arts (BAMMA) on 14 November 2015.

Fight Card

Preliminary Card
Weight class				Method	Round	Time	Notes
Bantamweight	Nathaniel Wood	def.	Bryan Creighton	Decision (unanimous)	3	5:00
Lightweight	Jai Herbert	def.	Ben Bennett	KO (body kick)	2	3:59
Bantamweight	Cameron Else	def.	Jay Butler	TKO (strikes)	1	2:48
Lightweight	Tobias Reid	def.	Craig Clarkson	TKO (punches)	2	1:43
Light Heavyweight	Brett McDermott	def.	Pelu Adetola	TKO (strikes)	1	1:57
Heavyweight	Stuart Austin	def.	Thomas Denham	KO (punch)	2	1:55	For the BAMMA Lonsdale British Heavyweight Championship
Flyweight	Nad Narimani	def.	Jeremy Petley	TKO (punches)	1	2:26
Lightweight	Damien Lapilus	def.	Jack McGann	Submission (rear naked choke)	1	3:30
Main Card
Weight class				Method	Round	Time	Notes
Bantamweight	Shay Walsh	def.	Edward Arthur (c)	Decision (unanimous)	3	5:00	For the BAMMA World Bantamweight Championship
Flyweight	Rany Saadeh (c)	def.	Shajidul Haque	Decision (unanimous)	3	5:00	For the BAMMA World Flyweight Championship
Light Heavyweight	Paul Craig (c)	def.	Marcin Lazarz	Submission (triangle)	1	3:51	For the BAMMA World Light Heavyweight Championship
Lightweight	Martin Stapleton	def.	Gavin Sterritt	Submission (rear naked choke)	1	1:18	For the Vacant BAMMA World Lightweight Championship

== BAMMA 24: Kone vs. Phillips ==
BAMMA 24
- Promotion: BAMMA
- Date: 27 February 2016
- Venue: 3Arena
- City: Dublin, Ireland

Event chronology
BAMMA 23	BAMMA 24	BAMMA 25

Preliminary Card
Weight class				Method	Round	Time	Notes
Women's Featherweight	Sinead Kavanagh	def.	Zarah Fairn	Decision (split)	3	5:00
Catchweight	Rhys McKee	def.	Alex Masuku	KO (Head Kick)	2	2:51
Featherweight	James Gallagher	def.	Gerard Gilmore	Submission (rear naked choke)	1	2:55
Bantamweight	Declan Dalton	def.	Mike Cutting	Decision (unanimous)	3	5:00
Featherweight	Brian Moore	def.	Mick Brennan	TKO (punches)	1	2:39
Featherweight	Dylan Tuke	def.	Mark Andrew	TKO (knee & punches)	1	0:51
Welterweight	Peter Queally	def.	Nathan Jones	Decision (unanimous)	3	5:00
Lightweight	Myles Price	def.	Mario Saeed	TKO (punches)	1	1:04
Main Card
Weight class				Method	Round	Time	Notes
Bantamweight	Alan Philpott (c)	def.	Nathaniel Wood	Doctor Stoppage (broken nose)	3	3:40	For the BAMMA Lonsdale British Bantamweight Championship
Light Heavyweight	Chris Fields	def.	Dan Konecke	Submission (D'arce Choke)	1	4:39
Bantamweight	Tom Duquesnoy	def.	Damien Rooney	TKO (punch)	1	1:22
Middleweight	Andy DeVent	def.	Paul Byrne	TKO (punches)	1	0:59
Middleweight	John Phillips	def.	Cheick Kone (c)	TKO (punch)	1	1:05	For the BAMMA World Middleweight Championship

== BAMMA 25: Champion vs. Champion ==
BAMMA 25
- Promotion: British Association of Mixed Martial Arts
- Date: 14 May 2016
- Venue: Barclaycard Arena
- City: Birmingham, England

Event chronology
BAMMA 24	BAMMA 25	BAMMA 26

Preliminary Card
Weight class				Method	Round	Time	Notes
Lightweight	Jai Herbert	def.	Tony Morgan	Submission (rear naked choke)	2	2:19
Featherweight	Dean Trueman	def.	Huseyin Garabet	Submission (guillotine)	1	4:48
Welterweight	Terry Brazier	def.	Issey Francis Buangala	Submission (rear naked choke)	1	0:38
Lightweight	Rick Selvarajah	def.	Oliver Coyne	Submission (rear naked choke)	1	3:52
Heavyweight	Łukasz Parobiec	def.	Tom Aspinall	DQ (strikes to back of the head)	2	3:33
Lightweight	Xavier Sedras	def.	Chris Bungard	Submission (rear naked choke)	2	2:58
Featherweight	Mike Grundy	def.	Marley Swindells	Decision (unanimous)	3	5:00
Light Heavyweight	Brett McDermott	def.	Jamie Sloan	KO/TKO (punch)	1	3:58
Bantamweight	Ed Arthur	def.	Cameron Else	KO/TKO (punches)	1	4:57
Middleweight	Matt Hallam	def.	Alexander Bergman	KO/TKO (punches)	2	1:27
Featherweight	Ronnie Mann	def.	Graham Turner	KO/TKO (punch)	1	1:18
Main Card
Weight class				Method	Round	Time	Notes
Lightweight	Marc Diakiese (c)	def.	Kane Mousah	KO/TKO (punch)	1	0:36	For the BAMMA Lonsdale British Lightweight Championship
Heavyweight	Mark Godbeer (c)	def.	Stuart Austin	KO/TKO (punches)	2	1:24	For the BAMMA World Heavyweight Championship
Welterweight	Walter Gahadza	def.	Colin Fletcher	DQ (illegal elbows)	1	0:12
Lightweight	Martin Stapleton (c)	def.	Damien Lapilus	DQ (illegal knee to downed opponent)	2	0:38	For the BAMMA World Lightweight Championship
Bantamweight	Tom Duquesnoy	def.	Shay Walsh (c)	KO/TKO (elbow)	1	1:15	For the BAMMA World Bantamweight Championship

== BAMMA 26: Saadeh vs. Young ==
BAMMA 26
- Promotion: British Association of Mixed Martial Arts
- Date: 10 September 2016
- Venue: 3 Arena
- City: Dublin, Ireland

Event chronology
BAMMA 25	BAMMA 26	BAMMA 27

Preliminary Card
Weight class				Method	Round	Time	Notes
Light Heavyweight	Ben Forsyth	def.	Pelu Adetola	Decision (unanimous)	3	5:00
Bantamweight	Darren O'Gorman	def.	Gary Morris	Submission (rear naked choke)	3	3:02
Middleweight	John Redmond	def.	Glenn Irvine	KO/TKO (punch)	2	0:19
Welterweight	Keith McCabe	def.	Aidan Brooks	Submission (armbar)	1	1:31
Featherweight	Rickie Smullen	def.	Andrew Murphy	Submission (heel hock)	1	1:16
Bantamweight	Blaine O'Driscoll	def.	Mark Andrew	Decision (unanimous)	3	5:00
Flyweight	Ryan Curtis	def.	Shamsul Haque	Decision (unanimous)	3	5:00
Featherweight	Rhys McKee	def.	Tommy McCafferty	KO/TKO (punches)	1	0:58
Welterweight	Joe McColgan	def.	Peter Queally	Decision (unanimous)	3	5:00
Main Card
Weight class				Method	Round	Time	Notes
Bantamweight	Alan Philpott (c)	def.	Aaron Blackwell	Decision (unanimous)	3	5:00	For the BAMMA Lonsdale British Bantamweight Championship
Women's Bantamweight	Sinead Kavanagh	def.	Katarzyna Sadura	KO/TKO (punches)	1	2:46
Lightweight	Paul Redmond	def.	Chris Stringer	Decision (unanimous)	3	5:00
Flyweight	Rany Saadeh (c)	def.	Andy Young	Decision (unanimous)	3	5:00	For the BAMMA World Flyweight Championship

== BAMMA 27: Duquesnoy vs. Philpott ==
BAMMA 27
- Promotion: British Association of Mixed Martial Arts
- Date: 16 December 2016
- Venue: 3 Arena
- City: Dublin, Ireland

Event chronology
BAMMA 26	BAMMA 27	BAMMA 28

Preliminary Card
Weight class				Method	Round	Time	Notes
Bantamweight	Ian Cleary	def.	Andrew Lofthouse	Decision (unanimous)	3	5:00
Bantamweight	Blaine O'Driscoll	def.	Neil Ward	Decision (unanimous)	3	5:00
Welterweight	Kiefer Crosbie	def.	Conor Riordan	Submission (triangle choke)	2	2:32
Welterweight	Richard Kiely	def.	Keith McCabe	KO/TKO (body kick)	1	2:03
Welterweight	Terry Brazier	def.	Niklas Stolze	Decision (unanimous)	3	5:00
Main Card
Weight class				Method	Round	Time	Notes
Welterweight	Nathan Jones	def.	Walter Gahadza	Decision (split)	3	5:00
Lightweight	Rhys McKee	def.	Jai Herbert	KO/TKO (punches)	1	1:47	For the vacant BAMMA Lonsdale British Lightweight Championship
Bantamweight	Tom Duquesnoy (c)	def.	Alan Philpott	Submission (rear naked choke)	2	3:35	For the BAMMA World Bantamweight Championship

== BAMMA 28: Parke vs. Redmond ==
BAMMA 28
- Promotion: British Association of Mixed Martial Arts
- Date: 24 February 2017
- Venue: SSE Arena Belfast
- City: Belfast, Northern Ireland

Event chronology
BAMMA 27	BAMMA 28	BAMMA 29

This event was co-promoted alongside Bellator 173

Preliminary Card
Weight class				Method	Round	Time	Notes
Featherweight	Paul Hughes	def.	Adam Gustab	TKO/KO (Punches)	1	1:32
Featherweight	Jonathan Brookins	def.	Declan Dalton	Decision (unanimous)	3	5:00
Welterweight	Will Fleury	def.	Kyle McClurkin	TKO/KO (Punches)	1	2:49
Welterweight	Keith McCabe	def.	Glenn Irvine	Submission (Heel Hook)	1	0:39
Featherweight	O. Olejniczak	def.	Jonathan Reid	KO/TKO (Punches)	1	1:47
Featherweight	Daniel Rutkowski	def.	Niall Smith	TKO/KO (Punches)	3	2:16
Featherweight	Andrew Murphy	def.	Stephen Kilifin	KO/TKO (Punches)	1	4:58
Main Card
Weight class				Method	Round	Time	Notes
Lightweight	Tim Barnett	def.	Rhys McKee (c)	KO/TKO (Punches and Knees)	1	4:58	For the BAMMA Lonsdale British Lightweight Championship
Featherweight	Damien Lapilus	def.	Ronnie Mann	Decision (unanimous)	3	5:00	For the vacant BAMMA World Featherweight Championship
Flyweight	Andy Young	def.	Dominique Wooding	Submission (Rear-Naked Choke)	3	3:06	For the Interim BAMMA World Flyweight Championship
Lightweight	Norman Parke	def.	Paul Redmond	Decision (unanimous)	3	5:00	For the BAMMA World Lightweight Championship. Parke missed the championship weight limit (155 lbs, Parke weighed in at 155.8 lbs), meaning only Redmond was eligible to win the title.

== BAMMA 29: McDermott vs. Wolf ==
BAMMA 29
- Promotion: British Association of Mixed Martial Arts
- Date: 12 May 2017
- Venue: Genting Arena
- City: Birmingham, England
- Attendance: 17,233
- Total gate: $3,433,543
- Buyrate: 1,432,567

Event chronology
BAMMA 28	BAMMA 29	BAMMA 30

Preliminary Card
Weight class				Method	Round	Time	Notes
Featherweight	Daniel Crawford	def.	Ronnie Mann	KO/TKO (punches)	1	3:28
Catchweight (73 kg)	David Khalsa	def.	Cian Cowley	Submission (rear naked choke)	1	2:40
Welterweight	Daniel Cassel	vs.	Daniel Olejniczak	Draw (majority)	3	5:00
Bantamweight	Shay Walsh	def.	Aaron Blackwell	Decision (unanimous)	3	5:00
Lightweight	Jai Herbert	def.	Rick Selvarajah	KO/TKO (punches)	2	0:37
Welterweight	Lukasz Swirydowicz	def.	Mick Stanton	KO/TKO (punches)	2	0:09
Featherweight	Daniel Rutkowski	def.	Cameron Hardy	KO/TKO (ground & pound)	2	2:13
Flyweight	Sam Halliday	def.	Mike D’Aguiar	Submission (triangle choke)	1	1:28
Heavyweight	Mindagus Gerve	def.	Maciej Sosnowski	KO/TKO	2	4:38
Middleweight	Nathais Frederick	def.	Pelu Adetola	KO/TKO (punches)	2	2:32
Middleweight	Aaron Chalmers	def.	Greg Jenkins	Submission (Americana)	1	2:09
Main Card
Weight class				Method	Round	Time	Notes
Welterweight	Terry Brazier	def.	Walter Gahadza	Submission (keylock)	1	4:28	For the vacant BAMMA Lonsdale British Welterweight Championship
Lightweight	Tim Barnett (c)	def.	Mario Saeed	KO (punches)	1	3:34	For the BAMMA Lonsdale British Lightweight Championship
Middleweight	Yannick Bahati	def.	Matt Hallam	Submission (rear-naked choke)	2	2:19	For the vacant BAMMA World Middleweight Championship
Heavyweight	Brett McDermott	def.	Ruben Wolf	TKO (punches)	2	0:54	For the vacant BAMMA World Heavyweight Championship

== BAMMA 30: Walsh vs. Philpott ==
BAMMA 30
- Promotion: British Association of Mixed Martial Arts
- Date: 7 July 2017
- Venue: Deva Stadium
- City: Dublin, Ireland
- Attendance: 10,000
- Total gate: 562,267

Event chronology
BAMMA 29	BAMMA 30	BAMMA 31

Preliminary Card
Weight class				Method	Round	Time	Notes
Welterweight	Ion Pascu	def.	Henry Fadipe	KO/TKO (punch)	1	4:16
Welterweight	Kiefer Crosbie	def.	Waldemar Cichy	KO/TKO (elbows)	1	2:01
Welterweight	Richard Kiely	def.	Daniel Olejniczak	KO/TKO (punches)	2
Welterweight	Maciek Gierszewski	def.	Steve Owens	KO/TKO	1	4:20
Light Heavyweight	Matt Clempner	def.	Ben Forsyth	Submission (triangle choke)	1	1:49
Featherweight	Decky Dalton	def.	Mick Brennan	KO/TKO (doctor stoppage)	2	1:15
Featherweight	Arann Maguire	def.	Dylan Logan	KO/TKO (punches)	3	4:20
Bantamweight	Blaine O'Driscoll	def.	Harry Hardwick	Submission (rear naked choke)	2	4:45
Lightweight	Chris Stringer	def.	Niklas Stolze	Decision (unanimous)	3	5:00
Lightweight	Richie Smullen	vs.	Rhys McKee	Draw (majority)	3	5:00
Main Card
Weight class				Method	Round	Time	Notes
Middleweight	Fabian Edwards	def.	Aaron Kennedy	Submission (rear naked choke)	2	0:44
Lightweight	Paul Redmond	def.	Rob Sinclair	Submission (knee bar)	2	2:11
Flyweight	Daniel Barez	def.	Ryan Curtis	Decision (unanimous)	3	5:00	For the inaugural BAMMA Lonsdale Flyweight Championship
Bantamweight	Shay Walsh	vs.	Alan Philpott	No Contest (Kick to Head of Grounded Fighter)	1	2:50	For the vacant BAMMA World Bantamweight Championship

== BAMMA 31: Jones vs. Lohore ==
BAMMA 31
- Promotion: British Association of Mixed Martial Arts
- Date: 15 September 2017
- Venue: SSE Arena
- City: London, England

Event chronology
BAMMA 30	BAMMA 31	BAMMA 32

Fight Card
Weight class				Method	Round	Time	Notes
Welterweight	Tommy King	def.	James Reedman	TKO (Punches)	1	1:12
Featherweight	David Khalsa	def.	Charlie Boy Howard	Decision (split)	3	5:00
Middleweight	Alex Montagnani	def.	Martin Hudson	TKO (Punches)	1	2:08
Lightweight	Nathan Rose	def.	Ollie Mathis	Decision (Split)	3	5:00
Bantamweight	Javid Basharat	def.	Tony Hall	Submission (Guillotine Choke)	2	1:42
Featherweight	Liam Davies	def.	Tanvir Boora	TKO (Elbows)	2	3:56
Main Card
Weight class				Method	Round	Time	Notes
Featherweight	Daniel Crawford	def.	Damien Lapilus (c)	TKO (Punches)	2	0:26	For the BAMMA World Featherweight Championship
Welterweight	Aaron Chalmers	def.	Alex Thompson	KO (Punch)	1	0:30
Middleweight	Mike Shipman	def.	Yannick Bahati (c)	KO (Spinning Back Fist)	3	1:20	For the BAMMA World Middleweight Championship
Welterweight	Alex Lohore	def.	Nathan Jones	KO (Knee)	1	4:13	For the vacant BAMMA World Welterweight Championship

== BAMMA 32: Lohore vs. Kiely ==
BAMMA 32
- Promotion: British Association of Mixed Martial Arts
- Date: 10 November 2017
- Venue: 3 Arena
- City: Dublin, Ireland

Event chronology
BAMMA 31	BAMMA 32	BAMMA 33

This event was co-promoted alongside Bellator 187

Fight Card
Weight class				Method	Round	Time	Notes
Welterweight	Ion Pascu	def.	Omar Jesus-Santana	Decision (split)	3	5:00
Flyweight	Dylan Tuke	def.	David Khalsa	TKO (punches)	2	1:09
Bantamweight	Dominique Wooding	def.	Blaine O'Driscoll	KO	3	1:47
Flyweight	Daniel Barez	def.	Andy Young (ic)	Decision (unanimous)	3	5:00	For the vacant BAMMA World Flyweight Championship
Welterweight	Alex Lohore (c)	def.	Richard Kiely	Submission (knee bar)	1	4:23	For the BAMMA World Welterweight Championship

== BAMMA 33: Scope vs. Lebout ==
BAMMA 33
- Promotion: British Association of Mixed Martial Arts
- Date: 15 December 2017
- Venue: Metro Radio Arena
- City: Newcastle, England

Event chronology
BAMMA 32	BAMMA 33	BAMMA 34

This event was co-promoted alongside Bellator 191

Fight Card
Weight class				Method	Round	Time	Notes
Welterweight	Justin Burlinson	def.	Josh Plant	Submission (rear-naked choke)	1	2:53
Lightweight	Rhys McKee	def.	Kams Ekpo	Submission (triangle choke)	2	2:08
Welterweight	Adam Proctor	def.	Nathan Jones	Submission (rear-naked choke)	1	3:35
Heavyweight	Darren Towler	def.	Tony Mustard	TKO (Punches)	1	0:56
Catchweight (175 lbs)	Curt Warburton	def.	Warren Kee	TKO (punches)	1	1:03
Main Card
Weight class				Method	Round	Time	Notes
Welterweight	Anthony Dizy	def.	Colin Fletcher	Decision (unanimous)	3	5:00
Middleweight	Fabian Edwards	def.	Louis King	Submission (rear-naked choke)	1	1:15
Welterweight	Aaron Chalmers	def.	Karl Donaldson	TKO (punches)	1	0:43
Lightweight	Ryan Scope	def.	Mickaël Lebout	Decision (split)	3	5:00	For the vacant BAMMA World Lightweight Championship

== BAMMA 34: Lohore vs. Brazier ==
BAMMA 34
- Promotion: British Association of Mixed Martial Arts
- Date: 9 March 2018
- Venue: SSE Arena
- City: London, England

Event chronology
BAMMA 33	BAMMA 34	BAMMA 35

Fight Card
Weight class				Method	Round	Time	Notes
Featherweight	Jonas Magard	def.	Diego Barbosa	Decision (unanimous)	3	5:00
Welterweight	Marcin Zywica	def.	Karl Donaldson	Submission (guillotine choke)	1	1:02
Welterweight	Josh Plant	def.	John Nicholls	Submission (heel hook)	1	0:55
Welterweight	Justin Burlinson	def.	Tommy King	TKO (punches)	1	2:54
Preliminary Card
Weight class				Method	Round	Time	Notes
Welterweight	James Reedman	def.	Jahreau Shepherd	TKO (strikes)	2	3:04
Featherweight	Nathan Rose	def.	David Khalsa	Decision (unanimous)	3	5:00
Bantamweight	Dominique Wooding	def.	Dominic Dillon	TKO (knees & strikes)	2	0:55
Lightweight	Steve O’Keefe	def.	Martyn Harris	Submission (rear naked choke)	1	1:07
Welterweight	Colin Fletcher	def.	Walter Gahadza	Submission (armbar)	2	1:50
Middleweight	Fabian Edwards	def.	Kent Kauppinen	Submission (armbar)	1	4:52
Main Card
Weight class				Method	Round	Time	Notes
Lightweight	Rhys McKee	def.	Tim Barnett	TKO (strikes)	1	4:30	For the vacant BAMMA World Lightweight Championship
Heavyweight	Chi Lewis-Parry	vs.	Stav Economou	No Contest (illegal elbow strikes)	1	1:36	For the interim BAMMA World Heavyweight Championship
Welterweight	Terry Brazier	def.	Alex Lohore (c)	Decision (split)	3	5:00	For the BAMMA World Welterweight Championship

== BAMMA 35: Lohore vs. Pascu ==
BAMMA 35
- Promotion: British Association of Mixed Martial Arts
- Date: 12 May 2018
- Venue: 3 Arena
- City: Dublin, Ireland

Event chronology
BAMMA 34	BAMMA 35	BAMMA Fight Night London

Fight Card
Weight class				Method	Round	Time	Notes
Welterweight	Maciek Gierszewski	def.	Karl McCalig	KO/TKO	1	3:16
Bantamweight	Matiss Zaharovs	def.	Austin Lynch	KO/TKO	2	2:33
Welterweight	James Sheehan	def.	Dillon Manning	Submission (rear naked choke)	1	2:45
Middleweight	Diarmuid O Buachalla	def.	Martin Ward	KO/TKO	1	0:31
Welterweight	Pawel Politylo	def.	Nathan Kelly	Decision (split)	3	5:00
Welterweight	Daniel Olejniczak	def.	Steve Owens	Decision (unanimous)	3	5:00
Lightweight	Sam Slater	def.	Jeanderson Castro	Submission (rear naked choke)	2	2:36
Lightweight	Myles Price	def.	Phil Raeburn	Decision (unanimous)	3	5:00
Lightweight	Anthony Taylor	def.	Dean Barry	Submission (rear naked choke)	2	0:39
Main Card
Weight class				Method	Round	Time	Notes
Flyweight	Blaine O'Driscoll	def.	Aaron Robinson	Submission (rear naked choke)	1	2:52
Middleweight	Fabian Edwards	def.	Claudio Conti	KO/TKO (body kick)	1	1:00
Welterweight	Kiefer Crosbie	def.	Josh Plant	KO/TKO (punches)	1	3:47
Welterweight	Ion Pascu	def.	Alex Lohore	Decision (unanimous)	3	5:00

== BAMMA Fight Night: London ==
BAMMA Fight Night: London
- Promotion: British Association of Mixed Martial Arts
- Date: 28 June 2018
- Venue: York Hall
- City: London, England

Event chronology
BAMMA 35	BAMMA Fight Night: London

Fight Card
Weight class				Method	Round	Time	Notes
Lightweight	Terry Brazier	def.	Rhys McKee	Decision (unanimous)	3	5:00
Featherweight	Anthony Taylor	def.	Mike Hales	Decision (unanimous)	3	5:00
Heavyweight	Chi Lewis Parry	vs.	Łukasz Parobiec	Draw (majority)	3	5:00
Lightweight	John Nicholls	def.	David Khalsa	Submission (rear naked choke)	2	3:04
Flyweight	Elliott Hoye	def.	Luke Shanks	KO/TKO (punches)	3	1:57
Welterweight	Jefferson George	def.	James Reedman	Decision (unanimous)	3	5:00
Featherweight	Kingsley Crawford	def.	Akonne Wanliss	Decision (unanimous)	3	5:00
