= Mike Davis (fighter) =

American mixed martial artist

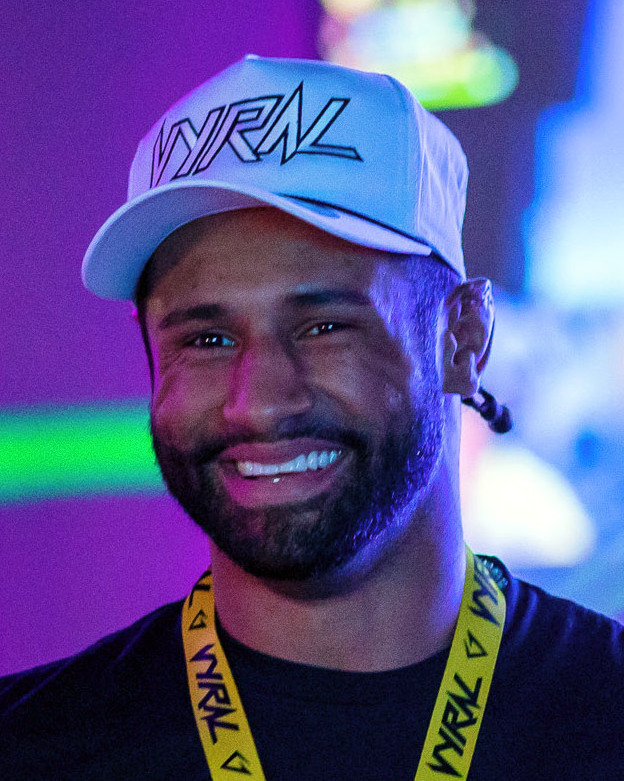
- Davis in 2022
- Born: Michael Davis; October 7, 1992 (age 34); South Cairo, New York, U.S.
- Other names: Beast Boy
- Height: 6 ft 0 in (1.83 m)
- Weight: 155 lb (70 kg; 11 st 1 lb)
- Division: Lightweight
- Reach: 72.5 in (184 cm)
- Style: Boxing
- Fighting out of: Orlando, Florida, U.S.
- Team: Cus D'amatos Boxing Gym (formerly); Moose Lodge (formerly); American Top Team; American Top Team Orlando; Fusion X-Cel
- Years active: 2015–present

Professional boxing record
- Total: 3
- Wins: 3
- By knockout: 2
- Losses: 0

Mixed martial arts record
- Total: 16
- Wins: 12
- By knockout: 8
- By submission: 2
- By decision: 2
- Losses: 4
- By submission: 1
- By decision: 3

Other information
- University: Columbia–Greene Community College
- Boxing record from BoxRec
- Mixed martial arts record from Sherdog

Michael Davis (born October 7, 1992) is an American professional mixed martial artist and professional boxer currently competing in the Lightweight division of the Ultimate Fighting Championship (UFC).

== Background ==
Davis was born in Hudson, New York and grew up in South Cairo, New York. Davis graduated from Cairo-Durham High School, where he also started wrestling. After the high school, Davis graduated from Columbia–Greene Community College with an associate degree in exercise physiology.

== Mixed martial arts career ==
=== Early career ===
After his amateur career, Davis turned professional in 2015. He racked up a record of 5–0 before he was invited to participate Dana White's Contender Series. He faced Sodiq Yusuff at Dana White's Contender Series 14 on July 24, 2018. He lost the fight via unanimous decision.

After the Contender Series, Davis continued in Island Fights. He faced Elvin Brito for the Island Fights Lightweight Championship at Island Fights 51 on December 21, 2018. He won the fight and the championship via third-round knockout. He won another fight against Carlos Guerra before being called to replace the injured Eric Wisely on short notice at UFC Fight Night: Jacaré vs. Hermansson.

=== Ultimate Fighting Championship ===
In his promotional debut, Davis faced Gilbert Burns at UFC Fight Night: Jacaré vs. Hermansson on April 27, 2019, losing the bout via second-round submission.

Davis was expected to make his sophomore appearance against Danny Henry at UFC Fight Night: Hermansson vs. Cannonier on September 28, 2019. However, Henry withdrew from the fight and Davis was subsequently booked to replace Brok Weaver and face Thomas Gifford at UFC Fight Night: Joanna vs. Waterson on October 12, 2019. He won the fight via third-round knockout.

Davis was then scheduled to face Giga Chikadze at UFC Fight Night: Benavidez vs. Figueiredo on February 29, 2020. However, Davis pulled out due to an injury. The bout was rebooked to take place at UFC on ESPN: Overeem vs. Harris on May 16, 2020, only to see Davis withdraw again due to a weight cut related illness and be replaced by Irwin Rivera.

Davis faced UFC newcomer Mason Jones at UFC on ESPN: Magny vs. Chiesa on January 20, 2021. He won the close fight via unanimous decision. He earned a Fight of the Night bonus for his performance.

Davis was scheduled to face Jai Herbert for the first time on March 19, 2022, at UFC Fight Night 204. However, Davis withdrew from the bout for personal reasons and was replaced by Ilia Topuria.

Davis was scheduled to face Uroš Medić on October 1, 2022, at UFC Fight Night 211. However, Medić was removed from the bout for undisclosed reasons and he was replaced by Viacheslav Borshchev. Davis won the bout via unanimous decision.

Davis faced Natan Levy on March 16, 2024, at UFC Fight Night 239. At the weigh-in, Levy weighed 156.5 pounds, half a pound over the lightweight non-title fight limit. The bout proceeded at catchweight and Levy was fined 20% of his purse which went to Davis. Davis won the bout in the second round by an arm-triangle submission.

Davis was scheduled to face Drew Dober on July 13, 2024 at UFC on ESPN 59. However, Davis was forced to withdraw from the bout due to a torn bicep.

Davis faced Farès Ziam on February 1, 2025 at UFC Fight Night 250. He lost the fight by unanimous decision.

Davis faced Mitch Ramirez on July 12, 2025 at UFC on ESPN 70. He won the fight by technical knockout in the second round.

Davis faced Nurullo Aliev on July 25, 2026 at UFC Fight Night 282. He lost the fight via unanimous decision.

== Boxing career ==
Davis is also a professional boxer, holding a record of 3–0 with two knockouts.

== Championships and accomplishments ==
- Island Fights
  - Island Fights Lightweight Champion (one time; former)
- Ultimate Fighting Championship
  - Fight of the Night (One time) vs. Mason Jones
- MMAjunkie.com
  - 2021 January Fight of the Month vs. Mason Jones

== Mixed martial arts record ==
Professional record breakdown
| 16 matches | 12 wins | 4 losses |
| By knockout | 8 | 0 |
| By submission | 2 | 1 |
| By decision | 2 | 3 |

| Res. | Record | Opponent | Method | Event | Date | Round | Time | Location | Notes |
|---|---|---|---|---|---|---|---|---|---|
| Loss | 12–4 | Nurullo Aliev | Decision (unanimous) | UFC Fight Night: Ankalaev vs. Guskov | July 25, 2026 | 3 | 5:00 | Abu Dhabi, United Arab Emirates | |
| Win | 12–3 | Mitch Ramirez | TKO (flying knee and punches) | UFC on ESPN: Lewis vs. Teixeira | July 12, 2025 | 2 | 4:08 | Nashville, Tennessee, United States | |
| Loss | 11–3 | Farès Ziam | Decision (unanimous) | UFC Fight Night: Adesanya vs. Imavov | February 1, 2025 | 3 | 5:00 | Riyadh, Saudi Arabia | |
| Win | 11–2 | Natan Levy | Submission (arm-triangle choke) | UFC Fight Night: Tuivasa vs. Tybura | March 16, 2024 | 2 | 1:43 | Las Vegas, Nevada, United States | Catchweight (156.5 lb) bout; Levy missed weight. |
| Win | 10–2 | Viacheslav Borshchev | Decision (unanimous) | UFC Fight Night: Dern vs. Yan | October 1, 2022 | 3 | 5:00 | Las Vegas, Nevada, United States | |
| Win | 9–2 | Mason Jones | Decision (unanimous) | UFC on ESPN: Chiesa vs. Magny | January 20, 2021 | 3 | 5:00 | Abu Dhabi, United Arab Emirates | Fight of the Night. |
| Win | 8–2 | Thomas Gifford | KO (punch) | UFC Fight Night: Joanna vs. Waterson | October 12, 2019 | 3 | 4:45 | Tampa, Florida, United States | |
| Loss | 7–2 | Gilbert Burns | Submission (rear-naked choke) | UFC Fight Night: Jacaré vs. Hermansson | April 27, 2019 | 2 | 4:15 | Sunrise, Florida, United States | |
| Win | 7–1 | Carlos Guerra | Submission (kimura) | Island Fights 54 | March 22, 2019 | 1 | 2:08 | Panama City Beach, Florida, United States | Featherweight bout. |
| Win | 6–1 | Elvin Leon Brito | TKO (punches) | Island Fights 51 | December 21, 2018 | 3 | 2:52 | Pensacola, Florida, United States | Won the Island Fights Lightweight Championship. |
| Loss | 5–1 | Sodiq Yusuff | Decision (unanimous) | Dana White's Contender Series 14 | July 24, 2018 | 3 | 5:00 | Las Vegas, Nevada, United States | Featherweight bout. |
| Win | 5–0 | Montrell James | TKO (punches) | Island Fights 46 | February 8, 2018 | 1 | 2:22 | Pensacola, Florida, United States | |
| Win | 4–0 | Anthony Retic | TKO (punches) | Island Fights 42 | October 14, 2017 | 2 | 2:35 | Pensacola, Florida, United States | Featherweight bout. |
| Win | 3–0 | Channin Williams | KO (punches) | Island Fights 41 | July 22, 2017 | 1 | 3:29 | Pensacola, Florida, United States | |
| Win | 2–0 | Erimus Mills | TKO (punches) | House of Fame 4 | October 29, 2015 | 1 | 1:19 | Jacksonville, Florida, United States | Lightweight debut. |
| Win | 1–0 | Richard Dehnz | TKO (punches) | House of Fame 3 | July 10, 2015 | 3 | 0:49 | Jacksonville, Florida, United States | Featherweight debut. |

== Professional boxing record ==
| 3 fights | 3 wins | 0 losses |
|---|---|---|
| By knockout | 2 | 0 |
| By decision | 1 | 0 |

| No. | Result | Record | Opponent | Type | Round, time | Date | Location | Notes |
|---|---|---|---|---|---|---|---|---|
| 3 | Win | 3–0 | (Ukraine) Viktor Kulakovski | TKO | 3 (4), 2:59 | 2 July 2016 | (United States) Hilton Bayfront, Saint Petersburg, Florida, US | |
| 2 | Win | 2–0 | (Puerto Rico) Daniel Rodriguez | TKO | 3 (4), 1:45 | 26 February 2016 | (United States) Tony Rosa Community Center, Palm Bay, Florida, US | |
| 1 | Win | 1–0 | (United States) Michael Anthony Leone | UD | 4 | 13 February 2016 | (United States) SE Livestock Pavilion, Ocala, Florida, US | |

== See also ==
- List of current UFC fighters
- List of male mixed martial artists
