= 2024 in Cage Warriors =

Mixed martial arts events

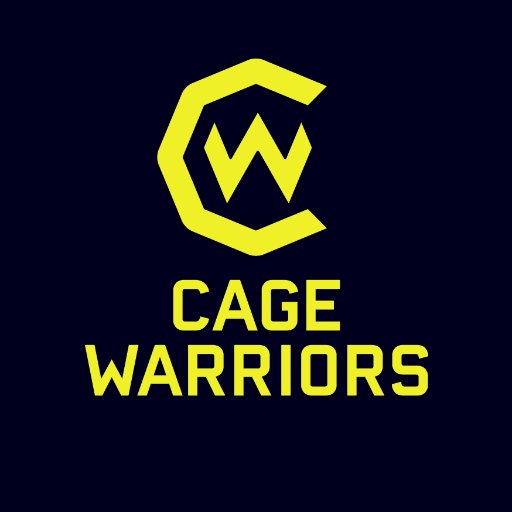

Information
- First date: February 23, 2024
- Last date: December 13, 2024

Events
- Total events: 17

Fights
- Total fights: 217
- Title fights: 9

Chronology
2023 in Cage Warriors	2024 in Cage Warriors	2025 in Cage Warriors

The year 2024 was the 24th year in the history of Cage Warriors, a mixed martial arts promotion based in England.

== List of events ==
#	Event	Date	Arena	Location
1	Cage Warriors 166	Feb 23, 2024	Sycuan Casino Resort	San Diego, California, U.S.
2	Cage Warriors 167	Mar 15, 2024	BEC Arena	Manchester, England
3	Cage Warriors 168	Mar 16, 2024	BEC Arena	Manchester, England
4	Cage Warriors 169	Mar 30, 2024	Indigo at The O2	London, England
5	Cage Warriors 170	Apr 6, 2024	Shelbourne Hall	Dublin, Ireland
6	Cage Warriors 171	Apr 20, 2024	Braehead Arena	Glasgow, Scotland
7	Cage Warriors 172	May 25, 2024	Vertu Motors Arena	Newcastle, England
8	Cage Warriors 173	Jun 7, 2024	Sycuan Casino Resort	San Diego, California, U.S.
9	Cage Warriors 174	Jul 20, 2024	Indigo at The O2	London, England
10	Cage Warriors 175	Jul 25, 2024	BEC Arena	Manchester, England
11	Cage Warriors 176	Sep 5, 2024	Braehead Arena	Glasgow, Scotland
12	Cage Warriors 177	Sep 20, 2024	BEC Arena	Manchester, England
13	Cage Warriors 178	Sep 21, 2024	BEC Arena	Manchester, England
14	Cage Warriors 179	Nov 2, 2024	PalaPellicone	Rome, Italy
15	Cage Warriors 180	Nov 15, 2024	Indigo at The O2	London, England
16	Cage Warriors 181	Nov 23, 2024	Vertu Motors Arena	Newcastle, England
17	Cage Warriors 182	Dec 13, 2024	Sycuan Casino Resort	San Diego, California, U.S.

== Title fights ==
Title fights in 2024
Weight class				Method	Round	Time	Event	Notes
Bantamweight	Liam Gittins (c)	def.	Roberto Hernandez	Submission (rear-naked choke)	5	1:48	Cage Warriors 168	(Note: For the Cage Warriors Bantamweight Championship.)
Light Heavyweight	Andy Clamp	def.	Matthew Byfield	TKO (punches)	3	3:06	Cage Warriors 168	(Note: For the vacant Cage Warriors Light Heavyweight Championship.)
Welterweight	James Sheehan	def.	Daniel Konrad	Technical Submission (arm-triangle choke)	4	4:27	Cage Warriors 170	(Note: For the vacant Cage Warriors Welterweight Championship.)
Featherweight	Harry Hardwick	def.	Orlando Wilson Prins	TKO (punches)	2	2:18	Cage Warriors 172	(Note: For the vacant Cage Warriors Featherweight Championship.)
Middleweight	Dario Bellandi (c)	def.	Robin Roos	Decision (unanimous) (49–46, 49–46, 49–46)	5	5:00	Cage Warriors 175	(Note: For the Cage Warriors Middleweight Championship.)
Lightweight	George Hardwick (c)	def.	Christian Iorga	Decision (unanimous) (50–45, 50–45, 50–45)	5	5:00	Cage Warriors 176	(Note: For the Cage Warriors Lightweight Championship.)
Light Heavyweight	James Webb	def.	Andy Clamp (c)	TKO (punches)	3	4:51	Cage Warriors 180	(Note: For the Cage Warriors Light Heavyweight Championship.)
Women's Bantamweight	Kennedy Freeman	def.	Mafalda Carmona	TKO (retirement)	4	5:00	Cage Warriors 181	(Note: For the vacant Cage Warriors Women's Bantamweight Championship.)
Featherweight	Harry Hardwick (c)	def.	Keweny Lopes	TKO (punches)	4	1:02	Cage Warriors 181	(Note: For the Cage Warriors Featherweight Championship.)

== Cage Warriors 166 ==
Cage Warriors 166: San Diego
- Promotion: Cage Warriors
- Date: February 23, 2024
- Venue: Sycuan Casino Resort
- City: San Diego, California, United States

Cage Warriors 166: San Diego was a mixed martial arts event promoted by Cage Warriors that took place on February 23, 2025 in San Diego, California, United States.

=== Background ===
A featherweight bout between former EliteXC Bantamweight Champion Wilson Reis and Toby Misech headlied the event.

=== Results ===
Fight card (UFC Fight Pass)
Weight class				Method	Round	Time	Notes
Featherweight	Wilson Reis	def.	Toby Misech	Submission (arm-triangle choke)	1	3:02
Lightweight	Mason Jones	def.	Bryce Logan	TKO (punches and knees)	2	2:45
Welterweight	Chasen Blair	def.	Orlando Sanders	TKO (punches)	1	2:09
Welterweight	Devin Goodale	def.	Bobby Winther	Decision (unanimous) (30–25, 30–26, 30–26)	3	5:00	(Note: Goodale missed weight (173.4 lb).)
Preliminary card (UFC Fight Pass)
Bantamweight	Corvan Allen	def.	Xavier Vines	Decision (unanimous) (30–27, 29–28, 29–28)	3	5:00
Heavyweight	Giovanni Sarran	def.	Elijah Harris	Decision (majority) (28–28, 29–27, 29–27)	3	5:00
Bantamweight	Miguel Peimbert	def.	Carlos Elizarraraz	Decision (split) (28–29, 29–28, 29–28)	3	5:00
Heavyweight	Diego Vazquez	def.	Sean Rose	Submission (armbar)	2	3:09
Heavyweight	Devon Simons	def.	Chadricc Kindle	Decision (unanimous) (29–28, 29–28, 29–28)	3	5:00

== Cage Warriors 167 ==
Cage Warriors 167: Unplugged
- Promotion: Cage Warriors
- Date: March 15, 2024
- Venue: BEC Arena
- City: Manchester, England

Cage Warriors 167: Unplugged was a mixed martial arts event promoted by Cage Warriors that took place on March 15, 2024, in Manchester, England.

=== Background ===
A welterweight bout between former Cage Warriors Welterweight Champion Stefano Paternò and Scottie Stockman headlined the event.

=== Results ===
Fight card (UFC Fight Pass)
Weight class				Method	Round	Time	Notes
Welterweight	Stefano Paternò	def.	Scottie Stockman	Submission (brabo choke)	1	2:59
Welterweight	Omiel Brown	def.	Rafael Aronov	Submission (guillotine choke)	2	3:48
Bantamweight	Shirzad Qadrian	def.	Emanuele Zaccaria	TKO (punches)	1	3:49
Flyweight	Connor Wilson	def.	Davide Scarano	Decision (unanimous) (29–28, 30–27, 30–27)	3	5:00
Bantamweight	Michele Martignoni	def.	Raz Bring	KO (punches)	1	3:59
Preliminary card (YouTube / UFC Fight Pass)
Lightweight	Teddy Stringer	def.	Diego Dickson Alves	Submission (rear-naked choke)	1	3:32
Lightweight	Amaury Junior	def.	Giuseppe Ruggeri	TKO (punches)	2	4:39
Welterweight	Anthony Orozco	def.	Lucas Rodrigues	Decision (unanimous) (30–27, 29–28, 29–28)	3	5:00
Featherweight	Jack Claffey	def.	Marko Sarasjärvi	Decision (split) (29–28, 28–29, 29–28)	3	5:00
Welterweight	Serigo Gavinelli	def.	Hélio Hernandez	TKO (punches)	1	0:56
Lightweight	Matthew Camilleri	def.	Nicolò Solinas	Submission (rear-naked choke)	2	3:13
Featherweight	Leon Armes	def.	Christian Tosco	Decision (unanimous) (29–28, 29–28, 29–28)	3	5:00

== Cage Warriors 168 ==
Cage Warriors 168: Manchester
- Promotion: Cage Warriors
- Date: March 16, 2024
- Venue: BEC Arena
- City: Manchester, England

Cage Warriors 168: Manchester was a mixed martial arts event promoted by Cage Warriors that took place on March 16, 2024, in Manchester, England.

=== Background ===
The event was headlined by a Cage Warriors Light Heavyweight Championship for the vacant title between Andy Clamp and Matthew Byfield. While, a Cage Warriors Bantamweight Championship bout between current champion Liam Gittins and Roberto Hernandez took place at the event.

=== Results ===
Fight card (UFC Fight Pass)
Weight class				Method	Round	Time	Notes
Light Heavyweight	Andy Clamp	def.	Matthew Byfield	TKO (punches)	3	3:06	(Note: For the vacant Cage Warriors Light Heavyweight Championship.)
Featherweight	Luke Riley	def.	John de Jesus	Decision (unanimous) (30–27, 30–27, 30–27)	3	5:00
Lightweight	James Power	def.	Gianluca Rocca	Decision (unanimous) (29–28, 29–28, 30–27)	3	5:00
Lightweight	Harel Cohen	def.	Adam Cullen	Decision (split) (29–28, 28–29, 29–28)	3	5:00
Bantamweight	Alessandro Giordano	def.	Sam Kelly	TKO (punches)	3	4:17
Preliminary card (UFC Fight Pass)
Bantamweight	Liam Gittins (c)	def.	Roberto Hernandez	Submission (rear-naked choke)	5	1:48	(Note: For the Cage Warriors Bantamweight Championship.)
Middleweight	Thomas Nichols-Burton	def.	Craig Rawlins	Submission (heel hook)	3	1:39
Lightweight	Antonio Sheldon	def.	Tom Means	Decision (unanimous) (29–28, 29–28, 29–28)	3	5:00
Preliminary card (YouTube)
Flyweight	Andy Yates	def.	Christian Tebbett	Decision (unanimous) (29–28, 29–28, 29–28)	3	5:00
Flyweight	Michelangelo Lupoli	def.	Sheldon Ryan	Decision (split) (29–28, 28–29, 29–28)	3	5:00
Flyweight	Fran Breen	def.	Costin Buhnă	TKO (elbow and punches)	3	1:21
Middleweight	Mario Mingaj	def.	Qendrim Pallata	Submission (triangle choke)	2	4:25

== Cage Warriors 169 ==
Cage Warriors 169: London
- Promotion: Cage Warriors
- Date: March 30, 2024
- Venue: Indigo at the O2
- City: London, England

Cage Warriors 169: London was a mixed martial arts event promoted by Cage Warriors that took place on March 30, 2024, in London, England.

=== Background ===
A featherweight bout between former Cage Warriors Featherweight Champion Jordan Vucenic and Simeone D'Anna headlined the event.

=== Results ===
Fight card (UFC Fight Pass)
Weight class				Method	Round	Time	Notes
Featherweight	Jordan Vucenic	def.	Simeone D'Anna	Submission (kimura)	2	2:53
Flyweight	Lone'er Kavanagh	def.	Shawn Claudino da Silva	Decision (unanimous) (29–27, 30–27, 30–25)	3	5:00
Middleweight	Will Currie	def.	Leon Aliu	TKO (retirement)	1	5:00
Catchweight (195 lb)	Carlos Pereira	def.	Darren Stewart	TKO (punches)	2	0:28
Welterweight	Olli Santalahti	def.	Jamie Richardson	Decision (unanimous) (29–28, 30–27, 30–27)	3	5:00
Preliminary card (YouTube / UFC Fight Pass)
Featherweight	Thomas Paull	def.	Dimitry Solimeis	Decision (unanimous) (29–28, 30–27, 30–27)	3	5:00
Bantamweight	Jimmy Quinn	def.	Yohan Salvador	Submission (guillotine choke)	2	0:57
Middleweight	Mitchell Goode	def.	Angus Hewett	Submission (buggy choke)	3	4:24
Catchweight (160 lb)	Ermil Xhaferi	def.	Aaron Johnson	Submission (rear-naked choke)	1	2:10
Flyweight	Amir Malekpour	def.	Tom Creasey	Decision (majority) (29–27, 30–26, 28–28)	3	5:00
Bantamweight	Tommy Brunning	def.	Kevin Simon Cesari	TKO (punches)	1	2:23
Lightweight	Shaun Fraser	def.	Tariq Pell	Decision (unanimous) (29–28, 30–27, 30–27)	3	5:00
Welterweight	Mariusz Mikołajewski	def.	Joshua Onwordi	KO (flying knee)	1	2:10
Flyweight	Jawany Scott	def.	Jean Matos	Submission (rear-naked choke)	2	1:08

== Cage Warriors 170 ==
Cage Warriors 170: Dublin
- Promotion: Cage Warriors
- Date: April 6, 2024
- Venue: Shelbourne Hall
- City: Dublin, Ireland

Cage Warriors 170: Dublin was a mixed martial arts event promoted by Cage Warriors that took place on April 6, 2024, in Dublin, Ireland.

=== Background ===
A Cage Warriors Welterweight Championship bout for the vacant title between James Sheehan and Daniel Konrad headlined the event.

=== Results ===
Fight card (UFC Fight Pass)
Weight class				Method	Round	Time	Notes
Welterweight	James Sheehan	def.	Daniel Konrad	Technical Submission (arm-triangle choke)	4	4:27	(Note: For the vacant Cage Warriors Welterweight Championship.)
Catchweight (160 lb)	Paul Hughes	def.	Fabiano Silva	TKO (knee and elbows)	1	4:37
Flyweight	Ger Harris	def.	Gregory Wamytan	Submission (guillotine choke)	1	3:32
Featherweight	Decky McAleenan	def.	Ville Mankinen	TKO (punches)	2	4:22
Bantamweight	Rory Evans	def.	Taka Mhandu	TKO (punches)	2	2:23
Preliminary card (YouTube / UFC Fight Pass)
Featherweight	Solomon Simon	def.	Ieuan Mackenzie	Submission (rear-naked choke)	2	4:59
Bantamweight	Scott Harvey	def.	Enrico Di Gangi	Decision (unanimous) (29–28, 29–28, 30–27)	3	5:00
Featherweight	Ryan Shelley	def.	Kallum Parker	Decision (unanimous) (29–28, 29–28, 30–27)	3	5:00
Women's Flyweight	Eimear Darcy	def.	Jenny Line	TKO (punches)	2	0:58
Bantamweight	Ciaran Brady	def.	Tomasz Zdanowski	Submission (rear-naked choke)	1	3:05
Welterweight	Dara Ward	def.	Ben Petches-Kelly	Submission (rear-naked choke)	1	2:44
Featherweight	Matthew Elliott	def.	Valentino Riva	Submission (arm-triangle choke)	2	1:06
Catchweight (120 lb)	Jennifer Trioreau	def.	Sinéadh Ní Nualláin	Decision (split) (29–28, 28–29, 30–27)	3	5:00	(Note: Ní Nualláin missed weight (124.3 lb).)
Flyweight	Jamie Abbott-Bissett	def.	Paweł Jezierski	TKO (punches)	2	2:03

== Cage Warriors 171 ==
Cage Warriors 171: Glasgow
- Promotion: Cage Warriors
- Date: April 20, 2024
- Venue: Braehead Arena
- City: Glasgow, Scotland

Cage Warriors 171: Glasgow was a mixed martial arts event promoted by Cage Warriors that took place on April 20, 2024, in Glasgow, Scotland.

=== Background ===
A lightweight bout between Dumitru Girlean and Chris Bungard headlined the event.

=== Results ===
Fight card (UFC Fight Pass)
Weight class				Method	Round	Time	Notes
Lightweight	Dumitru Girlean	def.	Chris Bungard	Submission (guillotine choke)	2	3:47
Bantamweight	Cameron Else	def.	Reece McEwan	Decision (split) (29–28, 28–29, 29–28)	3	5:00
Welterweight	Sean Clancy Jr.	def.	Lucas Rodrigues	TKO (elbows)	2	4:04
Bantamweight	Aidan Stephen	def.	Gianluca Scottoli	Decision (unanimous) (29–28, 30–27, 30–27)	3	5:00
Flyweight	Nicolas Leblond	def.	Scott Malone	TKO (punches)	3	1:27
Bantamweight	Keir Harvie	def.	Kaique Modesto	Decision (unanimous) (30–27, 30–27, 30–26)	3	5:00
Lightweight	Jan Quaeyhaegens	def.	Konstantinos Ntelis	Submission (rear-naked choke)	2	4:11
Preliminary card (YouTube / UFC Fight Pass)
Featherweight	Paull McBain	def.	Alberth Dias	TKO (corner stoppage)	2	5:00
Bantamweight	Daan Duijs	def.	Jack Eglin	Decision (split) (29–28, 28–29, 29–27)	3	5:00
Lightweight	Jordan Little	def.	Jordan Stronge	Decision (split) (29–28, 28–29, 29–28)	3	5:00
Light Heavyweight	Nell Ariano	def.	Jamie MacDonald	TKO (punches)	2	3:45	(Note: MacDonald missed weight (208.9 lb).)
Lightweight	Michael Blair	def.	Dec Dean	Decision (unanimous) (30–27, 30–27, 30–26)	3	5:00
Flyweight	Igor Wojtas	def.	Ronal Siahaan	Decision (unanimous) (30–27, 30–27, 30–27)	3	5:00
Bantamweight	Iain Postlethwaite	def.	Pav Singh Sahota	Decision (unanimous) (30–27, 30–27, 30–27)	3	5:00
Welterweight	Khadim Dia	def.	Mush Aslani	Decision (unanimous) (29–28, 29–28, 29–28)	3	5:00
Featherweight	Cornellius Aritonang	def.	Thomas Hepburn	Submission (rear-naked choke)	1	1:05

== Cage Warriors 172 ==
Cage Warriors 172: Newcastle
- Promotion: Cage Warriors
- Date: May 25, 2024
- Venue: Vertu Motors Arena
- City: Newcastle, England

Cage Warriors 172: Newcastle was a mixed martial arts event produced by Cage Warriors that took place on May 25, 2024, in Newcastle, England.

=== Background ===
A Cage Warriors Featherweight Championship bout for the vacant title between Harry Hardwick and Orlando Wilson Prins headlined the event.

=== Results ===
Fight card (UFC Fight Pass)
Weight class				Method	Round	Time	Notes
Featherweight	Harry Hardwick	def.	Orlando Wilson Prins	TKO (punches)	2	2:18	(Note: For the vacant Cage Warriors Featherweight Championship.)
Lightweight	James Power	def.	Daniel Kolasiński	TKO (punches)	2	0:10
Bantamweight	Kennedy Freeman	def.	Gisele Libânio	KO (punch)	3	3:08
Lightweight	Leon Hill	def.	Tommy Hawthorn	Submission (rear-naked choke)	2	2:28
Lightweight	Chasen Blair	def.	Artūrs Leisāns	Submission (armbar)	2	2:12
Lightweight	Aiden Lee	def.	Josh Abraham	Submission (rear-naked choke)	1	4:46
Preliminary card (YouTube / UFC Fight Pass)
Bantamweight	Jack Humphries	def.	João Pedro dos Santos	Submission (rear-naked choke)	1	3:00
Middleweight	Michael Tchamou	def.	Joe Ambler	Submission (guillotine choke)	1	2:27
Bantamweight	Joe Fields	def.	Tom Wright	Submission (rear-naked choke)	1	1:55
Light Heavyweight	Charles Joyner	def.	Albert Serpeti	KO (knee to the body)	1	1:07
Welterweight	Jackson Clarke	def.	Faudel Bentayeb	Decision (unanimous) (29–28, 30–27, 30–26)	3	5:00
Middleweight	Jordan O'Neill	def.	Thodoris Serdes	KO (body kick)	1	1:18

== Cage Warriors 173 ==
Cage Warriors 173: San Diego
- Promotion: Cage Warriors
- Date: June 7, 2024
- Venue: Sycuan Casino Resort
- City: San Diego, California, United States

Cage Warriors 173: San Diego was a mixed martial arts event produced by Cage Warriors that took place on June 7, 2024, in San Diego, California, United States.

=== Background ===
A featherweight bout between former EliteXC Bantamweight Champion Wilson Reis and former LFA Featherweight Champion Bruno Souza headlined the event.

=== Results ===
Fight card (UFC Fight Pass)
Weight class				Method	Round	Time	Notes
Featherweight	Bruno Souza	def.	Wilson Reis	Decision (unanimous) (29–28, 29–28, 29–28)	3	5:00
Featherweight	Javier Garcia	def.	Roberto Hernandez	Decision (split) (29–28, 28–29, 29–28)	3	5:00
Featherweight	Damon Wilson	def.	Brandon Carrillo	Decision (unanimous) (30–27, 30–27, 30–27)	3	5:00
Featherweight	Xavier Vines	def.	Diego Bigelow	Decision (unanimous) (30–27, 30–27, 30–27)	3	5:00
Bantamweight	Magomed Bayduev	def.	James Settle	Submission (rear-naked choke)	2	3:52	(Note: Bayduev missed weight (138 lb).)
Preliminary card (YouTube / UFC Fight Pass)
Heavyweight	Sean Rose	def.	Chadricc Kindle	TKO (punches)	1	2:04
Lightweight	Anthony DeSilva	def.	Joseph Perez	KO (punch)	1	2:43
Catchweight (198 lb)	Chris Owen	vs.	Ilias Faquiri	No Contest (accidental groin kick)	2	1:30	(Note: Accidental groin kick rendered Faquiri unable to continue.)

== Cage Warriors 174 ==
Cage Warriors 174: London
- Promotion: Cage Warriors
- Date: July 20, 2024
- Venue: Indigo at The O2
- City: London, England

Cage Warriors 174: London was a mixed martial arts event produced by Cage Warriors that took place on June 20, 2024, in London, England.

=== Background ===
A Cage Warriors Flyweight Championship bout between current champion Shajidul Haque and Nicholas Leblond was expected to headline the event. However, Haque was forced to withdraw due to injury and was replaced by Amir Malekpour for the interim title. In turn, Malekpour was forced to withdraw on medical grounds shortly after accepting the fight and Leblond faced Gerasimos Sioutis in a bantamweight bout instead.

The One-Night of Prize Fighter Bantamweight Tournament took place at the event.

=== Results ===
Fight card (UFC Fight Pass)
Weight class				Method	Round	Time	Notes
Bantamweight	Shirzad Qadrian	def.	Alexander Lööf	Decision (split) (29–28, 27–30, 30–27)	3	5:00	(Note: Prize Fighter Bantamweight Tournament Final.)
Catchweight (159 lb)	Jordan Vucenic	def.	Adrian Kępa	Submission (guillotine choke)	1	1:22
Flyweight	Jawany Scott	def.	Ger Harris	Decision (split) (29–28, 28–29, 30–27)	3	5:00
Light Heavyweight	James Webb	def.	Adam Biegański	Decision (unanimous) (29–28, 29–28, 30–27)	3	5:00
Featherweight	Nik Bagley	def.	Ryan Shelley	Submission (rear-naked choke)	1	2:28
Featherweight	Milad Ahady	def.	Thomas Paull	Decision (unanimous) (30–27, 30–27, 30–27)	3	5:00
Preliminary card (UFC Fight Pass)
Bantamweight	Jimmy Quinn	def.	Imad Bouamri	KO (flying knee and punches)	1	1:01
Welterweight	Rafael Aronov	def.	Jamie Richardson	Submission (arm-triangle choke)	2	1:21
Bantamweight	Gheorghe Grozav	def.	Tommy Brunning	Submission (kimura)	2	4:13
Welterweight	Craig Edwards	def.	Sergio Gavinelli	KO (punches)	1	0:47
Bantamweight	Alexander Lööf	def.	Aidan Stephen	Decision (unanimous) (20–17, 20–17, 20–18)	2	5:00	(Note: Prize Fighter Bantamweight Tournament Semifinal.)
Bantamweight	Shirzad Qadrian	def.	Weslley Maia	Ex. Decision (unanimous) (29–28, 29–28, 29–28)	3	5:00	(Note: Prize Fighter Bantamweight Tournament Semifinal.)
Bantamweight	Alessandro Giordano	def.	Michele Martignoni	Submission (guillotine choke)	3	4:33	(Note: Prize Fighter Bantamweight Tournament Alternate bout.)
Early preliminary card (YouTube)
Bantamweight	Nicolas Leblond	def.	Gerasimos Sioutis	Decision (unanimous) (30–27, 30–27, 29–28)	3	5:00
Women's Strawweight	Rhi Rhi Hudson	def.	Jennifer Trioreau	KO (punches)	1	0:13
Lightweight	Daniel Crooks-May	vs.	Jordan Little	No Contest (illegal knee)	2	4:04	(Note: Accidental illegal knee rendered Little unable to continue.)
Women's Flyweight	Eimear Darcy	def.	Camilla Bergstrøm	TKO (punches)	1	2:45
Welterweight	Giacomo Michelis	def.	Mush Aslani	TKO (punches)	2	1:35
Light Heavyweight	Francesco Mazzeo	def.	Vanderlei Junior	KO (punch)	1	0:37
Featherweight	Matthew Elliott	def.	Luca Borando	Submission (rear-naked choke)	2	4:24

=== Prize Fighter Bantamweight Tournament ===
Semifinal
(Iran) Shirzad Qadrian	UD
(Brazil) Weslley Maia	3
(Scotland) Aidan Stephen	2
(Sweden) Alexander Lööf	UD

Final
(Iran) Shirzad Qadrian	SD
(Sweden) Alexander Lööf	3

== Cage Warriors 175 ==
Cage Warriors 175: Manchester
- Promotion: Cage Warriors
- Date: July 25, 2024
- Venue: BEC Arena
- City: Manchester, England

Cage Warriors 175: Manchester was a mixed martial arts event produced by Cage Warriors that took place on July 25, 2024, in Manchester, England.

=== Background ===
The event was headlined by a Cage Warriors Middleweight Championship bout between current champion Dario Bellandi and Robin Roos.

=== Results ===
Fight card (UFC Fight Pass)
Weight class				Method	Round	Time	Notes
Middleweight	Dario Bellandi (c)	def.	Robin Roos	Decision (unanimous) (49–46, 49–46, 49–46)	5	5:00	(Note: For the Cage Warriors Middleweight Championship.)
Lightweight	Mason Jones	def.	Michael Pagani	Decision (unanimous) (29–28, 29–28, 30–26)	3	5:00
Catchweight (161 lb)	Adam Cullen	def.	Yan Blasco	TKO (elbows)	3	2:50
Welterweight	Stefano Paternò	def.	Oli Santalahti	KO (punches)	3	3:56
Lightweight	Ieuan Davies	def.	Adam Shelley	Submission (rear-naked choke)	2	1:18
Lightweight	Matthew Camilleri	def.	Emanuele Sabatino	Decision (split) (29–28, 28–29, 29–28)	3	5:00
Preliminary card (UFC Fight Pass)
Middleweight	George Smith	def.	Craig Rawlins	Submission (triangle choke)	1	4:48
Flyweight	Connor Wilson	def.	Raz Bring	Decision (unanimous) (29–28, 29–28, 29–28)	3	5:00
Flyweight	Florian Doskja	def.	Christian Tebbett	Decision (unanimous) (29–28, 29–28, 29–28)	3	5:00
Welterweight	Manuel del Valle	def.	Mariusz Mikołajewski	TKO (elbows)	2	5:00
Flyweight	Davide Scarano	def.	Francis Breen	Submission (armbar)	1	4:44
Featherweight	Giuseppe Mastrogiacomo	def.	Seyed Hossein Mousavi	TKO (elbow and punches)	3	2:29
Early Preliminary card (YouTube)
Featherweight	Kallum Parker	def.	Jack Claffey	TKO (punches)	1	1:15
Featherweight	Damon Donald	def.	Matteo Martignoni	TKO (retirement)	2	5:00
Middleweight	Naglis Kanišauskas	def.	Leon Naumann	KO (punches)	2	4:50
Flyweight	Dylan Hazan	def.	Elves Oliveira	KO (flying knee)	2	0:12
Catchweight (165 lb)	Teddy Stringer	def.	Maicon Kobayashi	Submission (rear-naked choke)	1	1:28	(Note: Kobayashi missed weight (166.1 lb).)
Lightweight	Simone Patrizi	def.	Diego Dickson Alves	KO (punches)	2	0:53

== Cage Warriors 176 ==
Cage Warriors 176: Glasgow
- Promotion: Cage Warriors
- Date: September 7, 2024
- Venue: Braehead Arena
- City: Glasgow, Scotland

Cage Warriors 176: Glasgow was a mixed martial arts event produced by Cage Warriors that took place on September 7, 2024, in Glasgow, Scotland.

=== Background ===
A Cage Warriors Lightweight Championship bout between current champion George Hardwick and Christian Iorga headlined the event.

The One-Night of PrizeFighter Welterweight Tournament took place at the event.

=== Results ===
Fight card (UFC Fight Pass)
Weight class				Method	Round	Time	Notes
Welterweight	Omiel Brown	def.	Bourama Camara	Decision (split) (27–30, 29–28, 29–28)	3	5:00	(Note: PrizeFighter Welterweight Tournament Final.)
Lightweight	George Hardwick (c)	def.	Christian Iorga	Decision (unanimous) (50–45, 50–45, 50–45)	5	5:00	(Note: For the Cage Warriors Lightweight Championship.)
Catchweight (163 lb)	Andrey Augusto	def.	Chris Bungard	Decision (unanimous) (30–27, 30–27, 30–26)	3	5:00
Bantamweight	Miguel Haro	def.	Reece McEwan	Submission (rear-naked choke)	3	2:13
Lightweight	Kye Stevens	def.	Michael Blair	Decision (unanimous) (29–28, 29–28, 29–27)	3	5:00
Bantamweight	Keir Harvie	def.	Rory Evans	Decision (unanimous) (29–28, 29–28, 29–28)	3	5:00
Preliminary card (YouTube / UFC Fight Pass)
Featherweight	Damon Donald	def.	Kallum Parker	Decision (unanimous) (29–28, 29–28, 29–27)	3	5:00
Welterweight	Sean Clancy Jr.	def.	Rafael Aronov	Submission (rear-naked choke)	1	1:08	(Note: PrizeFighter Welterweight Tournament Reserve bout.)
Welterweight	Bourama Camara	def.	Marko Kisic	Decision (unanimous) (20–18, 20–18, 20–18)	2	5:00	(Note: PrizeFighter Welterweight Tournament Semifinal.)
Welterweight	Omiel Brown	def.	Henri Lintula	TKO (punches)	1	4:43	(Note: PrizeFighter Welterweight Tournament Semifinal.)
Lightweight	Jordan Stronge	def.	Wesley Machado	TKO (punches)	1	1:12
Lightweight	Ryan Campbell	def.	Shahram Hotak	Decision (unanimous) (30–27, 30–27, 30–27)	3	5:00
Light Heavyweight	Charles Joyner	def.	Brandon Guest	Decision (unanimous) (30–27, 30–27, 30–27)	3	5:00
Flyweight	Ryan Hewitt	def.	Reg Hingston	TKO (body kick)	1	3:47

=== PrizeFighter Welterweight Tournament ===
Semifinal
(England) Omiel Brown	TKO
(Finland) Henri Lintula	1
(France) Bourama Camara	UD
(Austria) Marko Kisic	2

Final
(England) Omiel Brown	SD
(France) Bourama Camara	3

== Cage Warriors 177 ==
Cage Warriors 177: Unplugged
- Promotion: Cage Warriors
- Date: September 20, 2024
- Venue: BEC Arena
- City: Manchester, England

Cage Warriors 177: Unplugged was a mixed martial arts event produced by Cage Warriors that took place on September 20, 2024, in Manchester, England.

=== Background ===
A Cage Warriors Welterweight Championship bout between current champion James Sheehan and Giannis Bacher was expected to headline the event. However, Sheehan withdrew due to injury. As a results, a lightweight bout between Chasen Blair and Florin Pîrtea was promoted to main event status.

=== Results ===
Fight card (UFC Fight Pass)
Weight class				Method	Round	Time	Notes
Lightweight	Florin Pîrtea	def.	Chasen Blair	Submission (triangle choke)	1	3:55
Bantamweight	Ollie Sarwa	def.	Percy Herrera	TKO (elbows and punches)	1	0:55
Lightweight	Marin Vertlia	def.	Adam Shelley	KO (punch)	1	3:07
Women's Strawweight	Alish Smith	def.	Rhi Rhi Hudson	TKO (punches)	2	2:28
Welterweight	Anthony Orozco	def.	Thiago Habib	TKO (elbows and punches)	1	3:58
Middleweight	Joe Middleton	def.	Joan Arastey	Submission (brabo choke)	1	1:27
Preliminary card (YouTube / UFC Fight Pass)
Welterweight	Michael Tchamou	def.	Angus Hewett	TKO (punches)	1	3:21
Light Heavyweight	Nell Ariano	def.	Farshad Nazarnia	Decision (split) (29–28, 28–29, 29–28)	3	5:00
Featherweight	Connor Patterson	def.	Jan Mašek	Technical Submission (arm-triangle choke)	3	3:39

== Cage Warriors 178 ==
Cage Warriors 178: Manchester
- Promotion: Cage Warriors
- Date: September 21, 2024
- Venue: BEC Arena
- City: Manchester, England

Cage Warriors 178: Manchester was a mixed martial arts event produced by Cage Warriors that took place on September 21, 2024, in Manchester, England.

=== Background ===
The event was expected to headline by a Cage Warriors Light Heavyweight Championship bout between current champion Andy Clamp and former Cage Warriors Middleweight Champion James Webb. However, the bout was moved to Cage Warriors 180 on November 15, 2024, with Clamp suffering from an illness. As a results, a featherweight bout between Luke Riley and Alexandre Junior headlined the event.

=== Results ===
Fight card (UFC Fight Pass)
Weight class				Method	Round	Time	Notes
Featherweight	Luke Riley	def.	Alexandre Junior	KO (punches)	1	2:05
Lightweight	Ieuan Davies	def.	Amaury Junior	Submission (rear-naked choke)	1	1:37
Catchweight (139 lb)	Jack Humphries	def.	Fabian Ufs	TKO (punches)	1	2:12
Lightweight	Gavin Hughes	def.	Dean Trueman	Submission (guillotine choke)	2	0:48
Welterweight	George McManus	def.	Dara Ward	Submission (armbar)	2	3:15
Lightweight	Shay Ingram	def.	Marc-Philippe Ngatchou	Decision (unanimous) (29–28, 29–28, 30–27)	3	5:00
Preliminary card (YouTube / UFC Fight Pass)
Flyweight	Joe Fields	def.	Costin Buhnă	Technical Submission (brabo choke)	1	2:24	(Note: Buhnă midsed weight (127.6 lb).)
Bantamweight	Nick Beukema	def.	Cameron Chamberlain	Submission (rear-naked choke)	1	2:24
Flyweight	Gregory Wamytan	def.	Sheldon Ryan	Submission (brabo choke)	1	1:09
Featherweight	Harry Shaw	def.	Stef Murray	Decision (unanimous) (30–27, 30–27, 30–27)	3	5:00
Flyweight	Jordan Molinari	def.	Matthew Friel	Decision (unanimous) (29–28, 29–28, 29–28)	3	5:00

== Cage Warriors 179 ==
Cage Warriors 179: Rome
- Promotion: Cage Warriors
- Date: November 2, 2024
- Venue: PalaPellicone
- City: Rome, Italy

Cage Warriors 179: Rome was a mixed martial arts event produced by Cage Warriors that took place on November 2, 2024, in Rome, Italy.

=== Background ===
A 175-pounds catchweight bout between former Cage Warriors Welterweight Champion Stefano Paternò and Jorge Bueno headlined the event. At the weigh-ins, Bueno came in at 175.8 pounds, 0.8 pounds over the 175 pounds limit and he was fined the percentage of his purse went go to Paternò.

=== Results ===
Fight card (UFC Fight Pass)
Weight class				Method	Round	Time	Notes
Catchweight (175 lb)	Stefano Paternò	def.	Jorge Bueno	KO (punch)	2	2:43	(Note: Bueno missed weight (175.8 lb).)
Catchweight (130 lb)	Konstantinos Ntelis	def.	Simone Patrizi	KO (punch)	1	1:30
Welterweight	Khadim Dia	def.	Leon Aliu	TKO (retirement)	2	5:00
Catchweight (141 lb)	Alessandro Giordano	def.	Emanuele Zaccaria	Decision (split) (29–28, 28–29, 29–28)	3	5:00
Featherweight	Solomon Simon	def.	Walter Cogliandro	Submission (ninja choke)	3	4:54
Featherweight	Giuseppe Mastrogiacomo	def.	Itay Tratner	Decision (unanimous) (29–28, 30–27, 30–27)	3	5:00
Preliminary card (YouTube / UFC Fight Pass)
Welterweight	Giacomo Michelis	def.	Olli Santalahti	Decision (unanimous) (29–28, 29–28, 29–28)	3	5:00
Welterweight	Luca Mele	def.	Daniele Battaglia	Submission (rear-naked choke)	2	3:04
Welterweight	Manuel del Valle	def.	Sergio Gavinelli	Submission (anaconda choke)	1	3:23
Bantamweight	Michelangelo Lupoli	def.	Gerasimos Sioutis	Decision (unanimous) (30–27, 30–27, 30–27)	3	5:00
Bantamweight	Damiano Scogna	def.	Emanuel Caperna	Submission (rear-naked choke)	1	1:53
Flyweight	Emanuele Tetti	def.	Angelo Terenzio	Decision (unanimous) (29–28, 30–27, 30–27)	3	5:00
Featherweight	Niko Ceraglia	def.	Andrea Flamminio	TKO (punches)	3	4:32
Featherweight	Luca Borando	def.	Nicolae Mezdrea	TKO (punches)	3	1:38
Catchweight (192 lb)	Mario Mingaj	def.	Zura Zarnadze	Submission (triangle choke)	1	1:50
Lightweight	Conor McCarthy	def.	Gianluca Rocca	Decision (unanimous) (29–28, 29–28, 29–28)	3	5:00

== Cage Warriors 180 ==
Cage Warriors 180: London
- Promotion: Cage Warriors
- Date: November 15, 2024
- Venue: Indigo at The O2
- City: London, England

Cage Warriors 180: London was a mixed martial arts event produced by Cage Warriors that took place on November 15, 2024, in London, England.

=== Background ===
The event was headlined by a Cage Warriors Light Heavyweight Championship bout between current champion Andy Clamp and former Cage Warriors Middleweight Champion James Webb. The pair was previously scheduled to headline at Cage Warriors 178, but the bout was moved at this event with Clamp suffering from an illness.

=== Results ===
Fight card (UFC Fight Pass)
Weight class				Method	Round	Time	Notes
Light Heavyweight	James Webb	def.	Andy Clamp (c)	TKO (punches)	3	4:51	(Note: For the Cage Warriors Light Heavyweight Championship.)
Featherweight	Nik Bagley	def.	Jordy Bakkes	Submission (rear-naked choke)	1	4:16
Middleweight	Paddy McCorry	def.	Tye Palmer	KO (punch)	1	0:46
Bantamweight	Weslley Maia	def.	Alexander Lööf	Submission (rear-naked choke)	1	4:19
Bantamweight	Giovanni Fernandez	def.	Jimmy Quinn	Submission (rear-naked choke)	2	1:31
Lightweight	Yusuf Nazokatov	def.	Cameron Stewart	Decision (unanimous) (29–28, 29–28, 29–28)	3	5:00
Preliminary card (YouTube / UFC Fight Pass)
Welterweight	Tariq Pell	def.	Danny Blundell	KO (body kick)	1	3:57
Flyweight	Jawany Scott	def.	Davide Scarano	Decision (unanimous) (29–27, 30–26, 30–26)	3	5:00	(Note: Scarano was deducted one point in round 3 due to grabbing the fence.)
Bantamweight	Richard Kallos	def.	Tommy Brunning	Submission (armbar)	1	1:25
Welterweight	Joshua Onwordi	def.	Joe Ambler	Decision (unanimous) (30–27, 30–27, 30–27)	3	5:00
Catchweight (150 lb)	Callum Haughian	def.	Marko Sarasjärvi	Submission (guillotine choke)	2	0:34

== Cage Warriors 181 ==
Cage Warriors 181: Newcastle
- Promotion: Cage Warriors
- Date: November 23, 2024
- Venue: Vertu Motors Arena
- City: Newcastle, England

Cage Warriors 181: Newcastle was a mixed martial arts event produced by Cage Warriors that took place on November 23, 2024, in Newcastle, England.

=== Background ===
The event was headlined by a Cage Warriors Featherweight Championship bout between current champion Harry Hardwick and Keweny Lopes.

A Cage Warriors Women's Bantamweight Championship for the vacant title between Kennedy Freeman and Emilia Czerwińska was scheduled for the event. However, Czerwińska pulled out for unknown reason and was replaced by Mafalda Carmona.

A Cage Warriors Flyweight Championship bout between current champion Shaj Haque and Nicholas Leblond was rescheduled to take place the event. However, the bout was cancelled after adverse weather conditions prevented Leblond from travelling.

=== Results ===
Fight card (UFC Fight Pass)
Weight class				Method	Round	Time	Notes
Featherweight	Harry Hardwick (c)	def.	Keweny Lopes	TKO (punches)	4	1:02	(Note: For the Cage Warriors Featherweight Championship.)
Women's Bantamweight	Kennedy Freeman	def.	Mafalda Carmona	TKO (retirement)	4	5:00	(Note: For the vacant Cage Warriors Women's Bantamweight Championship.)
Welterweight	Justin Burlinson	def.	Theodor Berggren	Submission (arm-triangle choke)	3	2:44
Lightweight	James Power	def.	Dumitru Girlean	KO (elbows)	2	2:08
Welterweight	Sean Clancy Jr.	def.	Andrey Augusto	TKO (punch to the body)	3	1:23
Light Heavyweight	Yannick Bahati	vs.	Charles Joyner	Technical Draw (split) (30–28, 28–29, 29–29)	3	2:54	(Note: Accidental eye poke rendered Bahati unable to continue.)
Preliminary card (YouTube / UFC Fight Pass)
Lightweight	Daniel Konrad	def.	Aiden Lee	Submission (rear-naked choke)	1	2:52
Lightweight	Bailey Gilbert	def.	Alberth Dias	Decision (unanimous) (28–27, 28–27, 28–27)	3	5:00	(Note: Dias was deducted two points in round 2 due to an illegal knee.)
Featherweight	Leon Armes	def.	Michał Folc	TKO (punches)	1	3:41
Middleweight	Qendrim Pallata	def.	James Dixon	Submission (neck crank)	1	2:12
Middleweight	Michael Tchamou	def.	Delmar Silva	Submission (guillotine choke)	1	1:20

== Cage Warriors 182 ==
Cage Warriors 182: San Diego
- Promotion: Cage Warriors
- Date: December 13, 2024
- Venue: Sycuan Casino Resort
- City: San Diego, California, United States

Cage Warriors 182: San Diego was a mixed martial arts event produced by Cage Warriors that took place on December 12, 2024, in San Diego, California, United States.

=== Background ===
A featherweight bout between Damon Wilson and Ryan Lilley headlined the event.

=== Results ===
Fight card (UFC Fight Pass)
Weight class				Method	Round	Time	Notes
Featherweight	Damon Wilson	def.	Ryan Lilley	KO (knees)	1	3:35
Catchweight (182 lb)	Anthony Orozco	def.	Dominico Salas	TKO (knee to the body and punches)	1	1:09
Featherweight	Raul Navarrette	def.	Xavier Vines	Submission (rear-naked choke)	1	4:56
Bantamweight	Johnny Robles	def.	James Settle	KO (punch)	1	0:23
Welterweight	Bobby Winther	def.	Blake Perry	Technical Submission (arm-triangle choke)	1	3:40
Preliminary card (UFC Fight Pass)
Bantamweight	Steve Mora	def.	Miguel Peimbert	Submission (guillotine choke)	2	3:56
Catchweight (162 lb)	Luis Fernando Medina	def.	David Morales	TKO (punches)	1	4:38
Featherweight	Eric Cortez	def.	Mike Zindler	Submission (anaconda choke)	1	1:35
Catchweight (140 lb)	Joshua Simpson	def.	Joshua Cervantes	TKO (punches)	2	4:27

== See also ==
- 2024 in UFC
- 2024 in Professional Fighters League
- 2024 in Bellator MMA
- 2024 in ONE Championship
- 2024 in Absolute Championship Akhmat
- 2024 in Konfrontacja Sztuk Walki
- 2024 in Rizin Fighting Federation
- 2024 in LUX Fight League
- 2024 in Oktagon MMA
- 2024 in Brave Combat Federation
- 2024 in UAE Warriors
- 2024 in Legacy Fighting Alliance
