= 2025 in Cage Warriors =

Mixed martial arts events

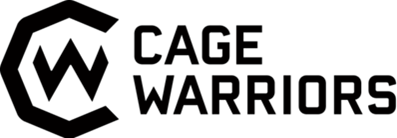

Information
- First date: March 8, 2025
- Last date: December 6, 2025

Events
- Total events: 17

Fights
- Total fights: 209
- Title fights: 12

Chronology
2024 in Cage Warriors	2025 in Cage Warriors	2026 in Cage Warriors

The year 2025 was the 25th year in the history of Cage Warriors, a mixed martial arts promotion based in England.

== List of events ==
#	Event	Date	Arena	Location
1	Cage Warriors 183	Mar 8, 2025	PalaPellicone	Rome, Italy
2	Cage Warriors 184	Mar 14, 2025	BEC Arena	Manchester, England
3	Cage Warriors 185	Mar 15, 2025	BEC Arena	Manchester, England
4	Cage Warriors 186	Mar 21, 2025	Indigo at The O2	London, England
5	Cage Warriors 187	Apr 19, 2025	Braehead Arena	Glasgow, Scotland
6	Cage Warriors 188	Apr 26, 2025	Shelbourne Hall	Dublin, Ireland
7	Cage Warriors 189	May 31, 2025	PalaPellicone	Rome, Italy
8	Cage Warriors 190	Jun 27, 2025	BEC Arena	Manchester, England
9	Cage Warriors 191	Jun 28, 2025	BEC Arena	Manchester, England
10	Cage Warriors 192	Jul 12, 2025	Indigo at The O2	London, England
11	Cage Warriors 193	Sep 13, 2025	Vertu Motors Arena	Newcastle, England
12	Cage Warriors 194	Sep 27, 2025	Shelbourne Hall	Dublin, Ireland
13	Cage Warriors 195	Oct 4, 2025	PalaPellicone	Rome, Italy
14	Cage Warriors 196	Nov 15, 2025	Indigo at The O2	London, England
15	Cage Warriors 197	Nov 21, 2025	BEC Arena	Manchester, England
16	Cage Warriors 198	Nov 22, 2025	BEC Arena	Manchester, England
17	Cage Warriors 199	Dec 6, 2025	Vertu Motors Arena	Newcastle, England

== Title fights ==
Title fights in 2025
Weight class				Method	Round	Time	Event	Notes
Middleweight	Dario Bellandi (c)	def.	Naglis Kanišauskas	Decision (split) (47–48, 48–47, 48–47)	5	5:00	Cage Warriors 183	(Note: For the Cage Warriors Middleweight Championship.)
Bantamweight	Liam Gittins (c)	vs.	Alessandro Giordano	No Contest (accidental eye poke)	3	2:18	Cage Warriors 183	(Note: For the Cage Warriors Bantamweight Championship. Accidental eye poke rendered Gittins unable to continue.)
Lightweight	Samuel Silva	def.	George Hardwick (c)	Decision (unanimous) (48–47, 48–47, 48–47)	5	5:00	Cage Warriors 186	(Note: For the Cage Warriors Lightweight Championship.)
Featherweight	Harry Hardwick (c)	def.	Javier Garcia	Technical Decision (unanimous) (40–37, 40–37, 40–37)	4	0:45	Cage Warriors 186	(Note: For the Cage Warriors Featherweight Championship. Accidental clash of heads rendered Hardwick unable to continue.)
Light Heavyweight	James Webb (c)	def.	John Allan	TKO (elbows and punches)	2	3:22	Cage Warriors 188	(Note: For the Cage Warriors Welterweight Championship.)
Welterweight	Justin Burlinson	def.	James Sheehan (c)	Submission (guillotine choke)	4	1:49	Cage Warriors 188	(Note: For the Cage Warriors Welterweight Championship.)
Lightweight	Omar Tugarev	def.	James Power	TKO (elbows and punches)	3	3:24	Cage Warriors 191	(Note: For the interim Cage Warriors Lightweight Championship.)
Flyweight	Shajidul Haque (c)	def.	Jawany Scott	Decision (split) (48–47, 46–48, 48–47)	5	5:00	Cage Warriors 192	(Note: For the Cage Warriors Flyweight Championship.)
Featherweight	Solomon Simon	def.	Caique Araujo	TKO (punches)	2	4:56	Cage Warriors 196	(Note: For the vacant Cage Warriors Featherweight Championship.)
Lightweight	Omiel Brown	def.	Omar Turgarev (ic)	Decision (unanimous) (49–46, 49–46, 49–46)	5	5:00	Cage Warriors 198	(Note: For the interim Cage Warriors Lightweight Championship.)
Flyweight	Nicolas Leblond	def.	Shajidul Haque (c)	Submission (rear-naked choke)	5	4:10	Cage Warriors 199	(Note: For the Cage Warriors Flyweight Championship.)
Welterweight	Sean Clancy Jr.	def.	Melvin van Suijdam	KO (punches)	2	0:29	Cage Warriors 199	(Note: For the interim Cage Warriors Welterweight Championship.)

== Cage Warriors 183 ==
Cage Warriors 183: Rome
- Promotion: Cage Warriors
- Date: March 8, 2025
- Venue: PalaPellicone
- City: Rome, Italy

Cage Warriors 183: Rome was a mixed martial arts event promoted by Cage Warriors that took place on March 8, 2025, in Rome, Italy.

=== Background ===
The event was headlined by a Cage Warriors Bantamweight Championship bout between current champion Liam Gittins and Alessandro Giordano.

A Cage Warriors Middleweight Championship bout between Dario Bellandi and Naglis Kanišauskas served as the co-main event. The pairing previously met at Cage Warriors 158 in July 2023, which Bellandi won by unanimous decision.

=== Results ===
Main card (UFC Fight Pass)
Weight class				Method	Round	Time	Notes
Bantamweight	Liam Gittins (c)	vs.	Alessandro Giordano	No Contest (accidental eye poke)	3	2:18	(Note: For the Cage Warriors Bantamweight Championship. Accidental eye poke rendered Gittins unable to continue.)
Middleweight	Dario Bellandi (c)	def.	Naglis Kanišauskas	Decision (split) (47–48, 48–47, 48–47)	5	5:00	(Note: For the Cage Warriors Middleweight Championship.)
Featherweight	Simone D'Anna	def.	Gianluca Scottoli	Submission (rear-naked choke)	3	1:51
Flyweight	Michelangelo Lupoli	def.	Dylan Hazan	Decision (unanimous) (29–28, 29–28, 29–28)	3	5:00
Lightweight	Konstantinos Ntelis	def.	Michael Pagani	Decision (split) (29–28, 28–29, 29–28)	3	5:00	(Note: Ntelis missed weight (164 lb).)
Featherweight	Aiden Lee	def.	Giuseppe Mastrogiacomo	Submission (rear-naked choke)	1	2:22
Preliminary card (YouTube / UFC Fight Pass)
Welterweight	Marco Doda	def.	Manuel Del Valle	Decision (unanimous) (29–28, 29–28, 29–28)	3	5:00
Lightweight	Adam Shelley	def.	Simone Patrizi	Decision (unanimous) (29–28, 29–28, 30–27)	3	5:00
Featherweight	Giuseppe Ruggeri	def.	Orlando Wilson Prins	KO (punches)	2	1:10
Bantamweight	Damiano Scogna	def.	Gerasimos Sioutis	TKO (punches)	3	0:29
Flyweight	Davide Scarano	def.	Florian Doskja	Decision (unanimous) (30–27, 30–27, 30–27)	3	5:00
Bantamweight	Pietro Mochetti	def.	Yohan Salvador	Decision (unanimous) (30–27, 30–27, 30–27)	3	5:00
Featherweight	Niko Ceraglia	def.	Mirco Negrisoli	Submission (rear-naked choke)	2	3:55
Flyweight	Kevin Caperna	def.	Jordan Molinari	Decision (split) (29–28, 28–29, 30–27)	3	5:00

== Cage Warriors 184 ==
Cage Warriors 184: Unplugged
- Promotion: Cage Warriors
- Date: March 14, 2025
- Venue: BEC Arena
- City: Manchester, England

Cage Warriors 184: Unplugged was a mixed martial arts event promoted by Cage Warriors that took place on March 14, 2025, in Manchester, England.

=== Background ===
A Cage Warriors Lightweight Championship bout between current champion George Hardwick and Lucas Clay was scheduled to headline the event. However, Clay withdrew due to injury and Hardwick was moved to Cage Warriors 186 in next week later instead. As a results, a welterweight bout between Anthony Orozco and Andrey Augusto served as new headliner.

=== Results ===
Main card (UFC Fight Pass)
Weight class				Method	Round	Time	Notes
Welterweight	Anthony Orozco	def.	Andrey Augusto	Decision (unanimous) (30–27, 30–27, 30–27)	3	5:00
Lightweight	David Jacobsson	def.	Matthew Camilleri	Decision (unanimous) (29–28, 29–28, 29–28)	3	5:00
Middleweight	Mantas Kondratavičius	def.	Michael Tchamou	KO (punches)	1	0:47
Catchweight (153 lb)	Damon Wilson	def.	Leonardo Camargo	TKO (knees and punches)	1	4:03	(Note: Camargo missed weight (153.6 lb).)
Light Heavyweight	Nell Ariano	def.	Danny Hartwell	KO (elbows)	2	0:48
Lightweight	Craig McGrattan	def.	Luca Finocchio	Decision (unanimous) (30–26, 30–26, 30–25)	3	5:00
Preliminary card (UFC Fight Pass)
Middleweight	Farshad Nazarnia	def.	Mitchell Goode	TKO (punches)	1	3:27
Light Heavyweight	Branden Guest	def.	Loic Pillon	TKO (punches)	2	3:56

== Cage Warriors 185 ==
Cage Warriors 185: Manchester
- Promotion: Cage Warriors
- Date: March 15, 2025
- Venue: BEC Arena
- City: Manchester, England

Cage Warriors 185: Manchester was a mixed martial arts event promoted by Cage Warriors that took place on March 15, 2025, in Manchester, England.

=== Background ===
A featherweight bout between undefeated prospect Luke Riley and Tariel Abbasov headlined the event.

=== Results ===
Main card (UFC Fight Pass)
Weight class				Method	Round	Time	Notes
Featherweight	Luke Riley	def.	Tariel Abbasov	TKO (knee and punches)	2	3:09
Lightweight	Teddy Stringer	def.	Antonio Sheldon	Submission (rear-naked choke)	1	1:25
Catchweight (160 lb)	Adam Cullen	def.	Nonato Junior	TKO (elbows)	1	1:46
Middleweight	Olli Santalahti	def.	George Smith	Decision (unanimous) (29–28, 30–27, 30–27)	3	5:00
Lightweight	Omiel Brown	def.	Yan Blasco	TKO (corner stoppage)	3	2:10
Bantamweight	Jack Humphries	def.	Nick Beukema	Submission (rear-naked choke)	2	2:45
Bantamweight	Richard Kallos	def.	Sam Kelly	Submission (guillotine choke)	1	1:35
Preliminary card (UFC Fight Pass)
Middleweight	Ethan Charlton	def.	Leon Naumann	Decision (unanimous) (30–27, 30–27, 30–27)	3	5:00
Catchweight (162 lb)	Shay Ingram	def.	Diamantis Chondronikolas	Decision (unanimous) (30–27, 30–27, 30–27)	3	5:00
Flyweight	Joe Fields	def.	Enrico Di Gangi	Decision (split) (29–28, 28–29, 29–28)	3	5:00
Lightweight	Chris Prince	def.	Alisson Marreira	DQ (illegal knee)	1	0:30
Flyweight	Christian Tebbett	def.	Ryan Hewitt	Decision (unanimous) (29–28, 29–28, 30–27)	3	5:00
Flyweight	Fran Breen	def.	Elves Oliveira	TKO (knee and punches)	1	4:17
Lightweight	Joshua Adeboye	def.	Aaron Pierre	TKO (knee and punches)	3	1:32

== Cage Warriors 186 ==
Cage Warriors 186: London
- Promotion: Cage Warriors
- Date: March 21, 2025
- Venue: Indigo at The O2
- City: London, England

Cage Warriors 186: London was a mixed martial arts event promoted by Cage Warriors that took place on March 21, 2025, in London, England.

=== Background ===
A Cage Warriors Featherweight Championship bout between current champion Harry Hardwick and Javier Garcia headlined the event.

A Cage Warriors Lightweight Championship bout between current champion George Hardwick and Samuel Silva took place at the event. The bout took place as a UFC Fight Pass Exclusive on the preliminary card.

=== Results ===
Main card (UFC Fight Pass)
Weight class				Method	Round	Time	Notes
Featherweight	Harry Hardwick (c)	def.	Javier Garcia	Technical Decision (unanimous) (40–37, 40–37, 40–37)	4	0:45	(Note: For the Cage Warriors Featherweight Championship. Accidental clash of heads rendered Hardwick unable to continue.)
Featherweight	Nik Bagley	def.	Keweny Lopes	Decision (unanimous) (30–26, 30–26, 30–25)	3	5:00
Middleweight	Will Currie	def.	Eli Aronov	Decision (unanimous) (29–28, 29–28, 29–27)	3	5:00
Light Heavyweight	Yannick Bahati	def.	Charles Joyner	KO (punch)	1	0:04
Lightweight	Tariq Pell	def.	Ermil Xhaferi	TKO (doctor stoppage)	1	5:00
Catchweight (140 lb)	Ollie Sarwa	def.	Yadwinder Singh	KO (punch)	1	4:29
Preliminary card (YouTube / UFC Fight Pass)
Lightweight	Samuel Silva	def.	George Hardwick (c)	Decision (unanimous) (48–47, 48–47, 48–47)	5	5:00	(Note: For the Cage Warriors Lightweight Championship.)
Flyweight	Jawany Scott	def.	Jonny Touma	KO (punch)	1	1:56
Lightweight	Daniel Crooks-May	def.	Cameron Stewart	Decision (unanimous) (29–28, 30–27, 30–27)	3	5:00
Women's Strawweight	Miriam Grubb	def.	Rhi-Rhi Hudson	Submission (rear-naked choke)	1	4:13
Welterweight	Rafael Aronov	def.	Danny Blundell	TKO (punches)	1	4:02
Bantamweight	Kadeem Perkins	def.	Tommy Brunning	Decision (unanimous) (29–28, 30–27, 30–27)	3	5:00
Middleweight	Joe Middleton	def.	Craig Rawlins	Submission (anaconda choke)	3	3:00
Featherweight	Jan Mašek	def.	Harry Shaw	Decision (unanimous) (29–28, 29–28, 30–27)	3	5:00

== Cage Warriors 187 ==
Cage Warriors 187: Glasgow
- Promotion: Cage Warriors
- Date: April 19, 2025
- Venue: Braehead Arena
- City: Glasgow, Scotland

Cage Warriors 187: Glasgow was a mixed martial arts event promoted by Cage Warriors that took place on April 19, 2025, in Glasgow, Scotland.

=== Background ===
A welterweight bout between undefeated prospect Sean Clancy Jr. and Italo Gomes headlined the event.

Before the event started, two bouts between Christian Soda vs. Yusuf Nazokatov and Weslley Maia vs. Reece McEwan were cancelled due to Nazokatov not being medically cleared and McEwan's illness respectively.

=== Results ===
Main card (UFC Fight Pass)
Weight class				Method	Round	Time	Notes
Welterweight	Sean Clancy Jr.	def.	Italo Gomes	Submission (neck crank)	2	0:58
Lightweight	Mathias Poiron	def.	Michael Blair	TKO (doctor stoppage)	2	2:29
Catchweight (160 lb)	Chris Bungard	def.	Artūrs Leisāns	Submission (rear-naked choke)	2	0:43
Catchweight (140 lb)	Aidan Stephen	def.	Jordy Bakkes	Submission (rear-naked choke)	3	1:58
Bantamweight	Alexandros Moumtzis	def.	Keir Harvie	Decision (unanimous) (29–28, 29–28, 29–28)	3	5:00
Featherweight	Paull McBain	def.	Bailey Gilbert	Decision (unanimous) (29–28, 29–28, 29–28)	3	5:00
Preliminary card (YouTube / UFC Fight Pass)
Bantamweight	Jack Foote	def.	Aaron Towns	Submission (rear-naked choke)	2	1:36
Lightweight	Jordan Stronge	def.	Chris Hayes	KO (flying knee)	1	4:57
Lightweight	Shaun Fraser	def.	Ryan Campbell	DQ (illegal knee)	3	1:21
Bantamweight	Tom Wright	def.	Iain Postlethwaite	TKO (punches)	1	3:34
Flyweight	Gary Priestly	vs.	Redgie Hingston	Draw (unanimous) (28–28, 28–28, 28–28)	3	5:00
Flyweight	Igor Wojtas	def.	Raz Bring	Submission (north-south choke)	3	3:08

== Cage Warriors 188 ==
Cage Warriors 188: Dublin
- Promotion: Cage Warriors
- Date: April 26, 2025
- Venue: Shelbourne Hall
- City: Dublin, Ireland

Cage Warriors 188: Dublin was a mixed martial arts event promoted by Cage Warriors that took place on April 26, 2025, in Dublin, Ireland.

=== Background ===
A Cage Warriors Welterweight Championship bout between current champion James Sheehan and Justin Burlinson headlined the event.

The co-main event took place a Cage Warriors Light Heavyweight Championship bout between current champion (also former Cage Warriors Middleweight Champion) James Webb and John Allan.

=== Results ===
Main card (UFC Fight Pass)
Weight class				Method	Round	Time	Notes
Welterweight	Justin Burlinson	def.	James Sheehan (c)	Submission (guillotine choke)	4	1:49	(Note: For the Cage Warriors Welterweight Championship.)
Light Heavyweight	James Webb (c)	def.	John Allan	TKO (elbows and punches)	2	3:22	(Note: For the Cage Warriors Light Heavyweight Championship.)
Flyweight	Marcus Vinicius Ferreira	def.	Ger Harris	Decision (unanimous) (29–28, 29–28, 29–28)	3	5:00
Featherweight	Maximus Lally	def.	Alexis Tsarmantidis	Submission (triangle choke)	1	3:52
Featherweight	Solomon Simon	def.	Cristian Iorga	KO (punch)	1	1:43
Preliminary card (UFC Fight Pass)
Welterweight	Adam Darby	def.	Tomasz Łangowski	Decision (unanimous) (30–27, 30–26, 30–26)	3	5:00
Featherweight	Keith Keogh	def.	Joe Doyle	Submission (rear-naked choke)	1	1:37
Lightweight	Chasen Blair	def.	Diego Visanzay Lencina	Submission (rear-naked choke)	1	3:00
Catchweight (160 lb)	Conor McCarthy	def.	Joshua Onwordi	Decision (unanimous) (30–27, 30–27, 30–27)	3	5:00
Preliminary card (YouTube / UFC Fight Pass)
Women's Flyweight	Daniela Sanches	def.	Eimear Darcy	Submission (armbar)	2	1:49
Bantamweight	Alexander O'Sullivan	def.	Daire Toman	Decision (unanimous) (30–27, 30–26, 30–26)	3	5:00
Featherweight	Scott Harvey	def.	Leon Armes	Decision (unanimous) (30–27, 30–27, 30–27)	3	5:00
Bantamweight	Ciaran Brady	def.	Giovanni Fernandez	Decision (unanimous) (30–27, 30–26, 30–26)	3	5:00
Featherweight	Matthew Elliott	def.	Kenny Mokhonoana	Decision (unanimous) (29–28, 29–28, 30–27)	3	5:00
Flyweight	Jamie Abbott-Bissett	def.	Charlie Falco	Decision (unanimous) (30–27, 30–27, 30–26)	3	5:00

== Cage Warriors 189 ==
Cage Warriors 189: Rome
- Promotion: Cage Warriors
- Date: May 31, 2025
- Venue: PalaPellicone
- City: Rome, Italy

Cage Warriors 189: Rome was a mixed martial arts event promoted by Cage Warriors that took place on May 31, 2025, in Rome, Italy.

=== Background ===
A welterweight bout between Giacomo Michelis and Sado Uçar headlined the event.

=== Results ===
Main card (UFC Fight Pass)
Weight class				Method	Round	Time	Notes
Welterweight	Giacomo Michelis	def.	Sado Uçar	Decision (split) (29–28, 28–29, 29–28)	3	5:00
Featherweight	Ryan Shelley	def.	Simone D'Anna	Submission (rear-naked choke)	2	3:22
Welterweight	Nicolò Solli	def.	Sulo Hilaj	Submission (rear-naked choke)	1	4:12
Catchweight (195 lb)	Paddy McCorry	def.	Shuki Farage	Decision (unanimous) (30–27, 30–27, 30–26)	3	5:00
Welterweight	Khadim Dia	def.	George McManus	TKO (eye injury)	2	5:00
Featherweight	Giuseppe Ruggeri	def.	Nicolas Barna	Decision (unanimous) (30–27, 30–27, 30–27)	3	5:00
Preliminary card (YouTube / UFC Fight Pass)
Flyweight	Nicolas Leblond	def.	Mateus Brauns	Decision (unanimous) (29–28, 29–28, 29–28)	3	5:00
Featherweight	Giuseppe Mastrogiacomo	def.	Mervan Gencer	KO (punches)	1	1:41
Featherweight	Luca Borando	def.	Jan Mašek	KO (body kick)	2	4:21
Flyweight	Gabriele Lionetti	def.	Kevin Caperna	TKO (corner stoppage)	1	5:00
Featherweight	Matteo Martignoni	def.	Luca Tarabori	Decision (unanimous) (30–27, 30–27, 30–26)	3	5:00
Catchweight (160 lb)	Salvatore Bellotta	def.	Fabio Condidorio	Decision (unanimous) (30–26, 30–26, 30–26)	3	5:00
Flyweight	Gary Rooney	def.	Enrico Di Gangi	Submission (armbar)	1	4:06
Featherweight	Francesco Tumminiello	def.	Umberto Di Munno	TKO (knee and punches)	1	0:56
Flyweight	Emanuele Tetti	def.	Rodrigo Rivoin	Decision (split) (30–27, 28–29, 29–28)	3	5:00
Featherweight	Antonino Amodeo	def.	Manuel Lancioli	Decision (unanimous) (29–28, 29–28, 29–28)	3	5:00
Bantamweight	Pietro Mochetti	def.	Dimitrios Tzeiranidis	Technical Submission (Von Flue choke)	1	0:47
Featherweight	Alessandro Ortolani	def.	Valerio Anza	Submission (rear-naked choke)	2	2:58

== Cage Warriors 190 ==
Cage Warriors 190: Unplugged
- Promotion: Cage Warriors
- Date: June 27, 2025
- Venue: BEC Arena
- City: Manchester, England

Cage Warriors 190: Unplugged was a mixed martial arts event promoted by Cage Warriors that took place on June 27, 2025, in Manchester, England.

=== Background ===
A featherweight bout between Aiden Lee and Alexander Lööf headlined the event.

=== Results ===
Main card (UFC Fight Pass)
Weight class				Method	Round	Time	Notes
Featherweight	Alexander Lööf	def.	Aiden Lee	Decision (split) (29–28, 28–29, 29–28)	3	5:00
Welterweight	Adam Darby	def.	Tato Primera	TKO (submission to punches)	2	4:56
Light Heavyweight	Nell Ariano	def.	Charles Joyner	TKO (punches)	3	3:30
Light Heavyweight	Aldo Pereira Aguiar	def.	Francesco Mazzeo	Decision (unanimous) (29–28, 29–28, 29–28)	3	5:00
Bantamweight	Emanuele Zaccaria	def.	Daniel Bainbridge	Submission (armbar)	1	1:38
Flyweight	Jordan Molinari	def.	Yannis Osmani	Decision (unanimous) (29–28, 29–28, 30–27)	3	5:00
Preliminary card (UFC Fight Pass)
Featherweight	Joshua Abraham	def.	Harry Shaw	Decision (unanimous) (29–27, 29–27, 29–27)	3	5:00	(Note: Shaw was deducted one point in round 2 due to an eye poke.)
Bantamweight	Charlie Boulton	def.	Kevin Azouz	Submission (rear-naked choke)	1	2:20

== Cage Warriors 191 ==
Cage Warriors 191: Manchester
- Promotion: Cage Warriors
- Date: June 28, 2025
- Venue: BEC Arena
- City: Manchester, England

Cage Warriors 191: Manchester was a mixed martial arts event promoted by Cage Warriors that took place on June 28, 2025, in Manchester, England.

=== Background ===
The event was scheduled to be headline by a Cage Warriors Bantamweight Championship rematch between current champion Liam Gittins and Alessandro Giordano. The pairing previously met at Cage Warriors 183 in March 2025, which the bout ended by no contest due to accidental eye poke. However, Giordano's coach has banned after him kick to Gittins due to the push with Giordano during the weigh-ins. On the day before the event started, Cage Warriors president Graham Boylan stated that Giordano has opted to withdraw from the event.

An interim Cage Warriors Lightweight Championship bout between James Power and Ieuan Davies was scheduled to serve as the co-main event. However, Davies was forced to withdraw for unknown reasons and was replaced by undefeated prospect Omar Tugarev.

=== Results ===
Main card (UFC Fight Pass)
Weight class				Method	Round	Time	Notes
Lightweight	Omar Tugarev	def.	James Power	TKO (elbows and punches)	3	3:24	(Note: For the interim Cage Warriors Lightweight Championship.)
Catchweight (165 lb)	Michael Pagani	def.	Tim Wilde	TKO (punches)	1	4:09
Lightweight	Lukas Cruz	def.	Adam Cullen	Technical Submission (rear-naked choke)	2	3:33
Lightweight	Torpal Merjoev	def.	Teddy Stringer	Submission (ninja choke)	2	1:22
Catchweight (165 lb)	Omiel Brown	def.	Edgar Escarrega	Submission (bulldog choke)	1	2:38
Lightweight	Shay Ingram	def.	Farukh Aligadzhiev	Technical Submission (rear-naked choke)	1	4:47
Catchweight (130 lb)	Connor Wilson	vs.	Florian Doskja	No Contest (accidental knee to groin)	1	2:27	(Note: Accidental knee to the groin rendered Wilson unable to continue.)
Preliminary card (UFC Fight Pass)
Flyweight	Joe Fields	def.	Davide Scarano	Decision (unanimous) (30–27, 30–27, 30–27)	3	5:00
Lightweight	Ryan Campbell	def.	Yusuf Nazokatov	TKO (punches)	3	0:39
Middleweight	George Smith	def.	Ghassan Abdenabi	Decision (unanimous) (29–28, 29–28, 29–27)	3	5:00
Flyweight	Fran Breen	def.	Mário Ferreira	Decision (unanimous) (30–27, 30–27, 30–27)	3	5:00
Lightweight	Chris Price	def.	Antonio Edson da Silva	TKO (elbows and punches)	1	4:24
Lightweight	Christian Soda	def.	Damon Donald	Decision (unanimous) (30–27, 30–27, 30–27)	3	5:00
Flyweight	Sheldon Ryan	def.	Brad Camps	Submission (rear-naked choke)	3	4:31

== Cage Warriors 192 ==
Cage Warriors 192: London
- Promotion: Cage Warriors
- Date: July 12, 2025
- Venue: Indigo at The O2
- City: London, England

Cage Warriors 192: London was a mixed martial arts event promoted by Cage Warriors that took place on July 12, 2025, in London, England.

=== Background ===
A Cage Warriors Flyweight Championship bout between current champion Shajidul Haque and Jawany Scott headlined the event.

=== Results ===
Main card (UFC Fight Pass)
Weight class				Method	Round	Time	Notes
Flyweight	Shajidul Haque (c)	def.	Jawany Scott	Decision (split) (48–47, 46–48, 48–47)	5	5:00	(Note: For the Cage Warriors Flyweight Championship.)
Bantamweight	Shirzad Qadrian	def.	Cameron Else	TKO (punches)	1	4:06	(Note: Cage Warriors Bantamweight title eliminator.)
Welterweight	Leon Hill	def.	Steven Hill	TKO (elbow and punches)	2	2:50
Welterweight	Anthony Orozco	def.	Luan Duarte	Decision (unanimous) (30–26, 30–26, 30–25)	3	5:00
Bantamweight	Weslley Maia	def.	Aidan Stephen	Submission (rear-naked choke)	1	4:53
Catchweight (160 lb)	Tariq Pell	def.	Adam Shelley	Submission (rear-naked choke)	1	4:06
Preliminary card (YouTube / UFC Fight Pass)
Bantamweight	Ollie Sarwa	def.	Damiano Scogna	Decision (split) (29–28, 28–29, 29–28)	3	5:00
Bantamweight	Jack Humphries	def.	Rory Evans	Submission (anaconda choke)	1	2:39
Middleweight	Naglis Kanišauskas	def.	Joe Middleton	TKO (punches)	1	2:37
Welterweight	Rafael Aronov	def.	Brad Wheeler	TKO (punches)	2	1:38
Middleweight	Mitchell Goode	def.	Tye Palmer	Submission (face crank)	1	3:02
Lightweight	Yusuf Ali-Taleb	def.	Antonino Amodeo	Decision (unanimous) (29–27, 30–26, 30–26)	3	5:00
Flyweight	Tom Creasey	def.	Raz Bring	TKO (punch)	1	1:29

== Cage Warriors 193 ==
Cage Warriors 193: Newcastle
- Promotion: Cage Warriors
- Date: September 13, 2025
- Venue: Vertu Motors Arena
- City: Newcastle, England

Cage Warriors 193: Newcastle was a mixed martial arts event promoted by Cage Warriors that took place on September 13, 2025, in Newcastle, England.

=== Background ===
A lightweight bout between former Cage Warriors Lightweight Champion George Hardwick and Jan Quaeyhaegens was scheduled to headline the event. However, Quaeyhaegens withdrew from the event due to injury and was replaced by Nonato Junior.

=== Results ===
Main card (UFC Fight Pass)
Weight class				Method	Round	Time	Notes
Catchweight (165 lb)	George Hardwick	def.	Nonato Junior	TKO (punches)	2	1:29
Lightweight	George Staines	def.	Willian Batista	Decision (unanimous) (30–27, 30–27, 30–26)	3	5:00
Lightweight	Andrew Fisher	def.	Orlando Wilson Prins	Decision (unanimous) (30–27, 30–27, 30–27)	3	5:00
Welterweight	Mateusz Figlak	def.	Tom Crosby	TKO (punches)	1	1:59
Bantamweight	Elton Armindo	def.	Reece McEwan	KO (punch to the body)	2	1:42
Lightweight	Michael Blair	def.	Grant Ogborne	TKO (punches)	2	4:21
Preliminary card (UFC Fight Pass)
Bantamweight	Sam Kelly	def.	Giovanni Fernandez	Submission (kimura)	1	2:43
Featherweight	Jack McHugh	def.	Connor Patterson	Decision (unanimous) (29–28, 29–28, 30–27)	3	5:00
Bantamweight	Ieuan Mackenzie	def.	Keir Harvie	Submission (guillotine choke)	1	4:29
Middleweight	Fraser Patterson	def.	Geoff Pavey	TKO (punches)	1	3:54
Women's Bantamweight	Giada Ghizzo	def.	Lexi Rook	TKO (body kick and punches)	2	1:00
Featherweight	Alexios Tsarmantidis	def.	Matthew Elliott	Decision (unanimous) (29–28, 29–28, 29–28)	3	5:00

== Cage Warriors 194 ==
Cage Warriors 194: Dublin
- Promotion: Cage Warriors
- Date: September 27, 2025
- Venue: Shelbourne Hall
- City: Dublin, Ireland

Cage Warriors 194: Dublin was a mixed martial arts event promoted by Cage Warriors that took place on September 27, 2025, in Dublin, Ireland.

=== Background ===
A featherweight bout between undefeated prospect Solomon Simon and Aiden Lee was scheduled to headline the event. However, Lee withdrew from the event due to an injury. As a results, a welterweight bout between Leon Hill and Luan Duarte was promoted to main event status. In turn, Duarte was pulled out from the bout due to issues with his travel documentation and was replaced by Samuel Blasco on 48 hours notice in a 179 pounds catchweight bout.

=== Results ===
Main card (UFC Fight Pass)
Weight class				Method	Round	Time	Notes
Catchweight (179 lb)	Leon Hill	def.	Samuel Blasco	TKO (head kick and punches)	1	0:58
Featherweight	Maximus Lally	def.	Ben Ellis	Decision (split) (29–28, 28–29, 30–27)	3	5:00
Flyweight	Ger Harris	def.	Jonny Touma	Submission (rear-naked choke)	1	2:58
Welterweight	Adam Darby	def.	Robert Constantin	TKO (punches and elbows)	3	3:41
Lightweight	Conor McCarthy	def.	Diego Visanzay Lencina	Decision (unanimous) (30–26, 30–26, 30–27)	3	5:00
Featherweight	Keith Keogh	def.	Damien McKenna	Submission (rear-naked choke)	1	2:01
Preliminary card (YouTube / UFC Fight Pass)
Catchweight (177 lb)	Manuel del Valle	def.	Stephen Costello	TKO (punches)	2	4:23
Welterweight	Anthony Orozco	def.	Aldo Pereira Aguiar	Decision (unanimous) (30–26, 30–27, 30–27)	3	5:00
Catchweight (149 lb)	Gabriele Galluccio	def.	Ryan Shelley	Decision (unanimous) (29–28, 29–28, 30–27)	3	5:00
Flyweight	Gary Rooney	def.	Gary Priestly	Submission (arm-triangle choke)	1	3:12
Featherweight	Jamie McGowan	def.	Joe Doyle	TKO (knee to the body and punches)	1	0:45
Light Heavyweight	Norbert Pietrzak	def.	Trevor Makengo	Decision (unanimous) (29–28, 29–28, 29–28)	3	5:00
Women's Flyweight	Eimear Darcy	def.	Justyna Kulińska	Decision (unanimous) (29–28, 29–28, 29–28)	3	5:00
Featherweight	Kenny Mokhonoana	def.	Damon Donald	Decision (split) (29–28, 28–29, 29–28)	3	5:00

== Cage Warriors 195 ==
Cage Warriors 195: Rome
- Promotion: Cage Warriors
- Date: October 4, 2025
- Venue: PalaPellicone
- City: Rome, Italy

Cage Warriors 195: Rome was a mixed martial arts event promoted by Cage Warriors that took place on October 4, 2025, in Rome, Italy.

=== Background ===
A Cage Warriors Middleweight Championship bout between current champion Dario Bellandi and Cláudio Ribeiro was scheduled to headline the event. However at the weigh-ins, Ribeiro weighed in at 190.6 pounds, 5.6 pounds over the middleweight title limit and Bellandi opted not to go forward with the fight. As a results, a 161 pounds catchweight contest pitting Daniele Scatizzi and Adrian Kępa served as the new main event.

=== Results ===
Main card (UFC Fight Pass)
Weight class				Method	Round	Time	Notes
Catchweight (161 lb)	Daniele Scatizzi	def.	Adrian Kępa	Submission (anaconda choke)	2	3:19
Bantamweight	Francesco Nuzzi	def.	Lucas Rodrigues Melo	TKO (punches and knee)	1	3:52
Welterweight	Nicolò Solli	def.	Daniel Karlsson	Decision (unanimous) (29–28, 29–28, 29–27)	3	5:00
Women's Strawweight	Chiara Penco	def.	Fabiola Pidroni	Decision (unanimous) (29–28, 29–28, 30–27)	3	5:00
Featherweight	Luca Borando	def.	Tariel Abbasov	TKO (knee and punches)	1	4:28
Featherweight	Nicolas Barna	def.	Simone D'Anna	TKO (punches)	2	0:42
Preliminary card (YouTube / UFC Fight Pass)
Middleweight	Gabriele Casella	def.	Rob Earls	TKO (punches and elbows)	1	0:23
Welterweight	Theodor Berggren	def.	Daniele Battaglia	TKO (punches)	2	4:44
Catchweight (130 lb)	Dimitrios Tzeiranidis	def.	Emanuele Tetti	TKO (leg kicks)	1	2:52
Featherweight	Francesco Tumminello	def.	Gabriele Cera	Decision (unanimous) (29–28, 29–28, 30–27)	3	5:00
Featherweight	Alexander O'Sullivan	def.	Manuel Lancioli	Decision (unanimous) (30–27, 30–27, 30–27)	3	5:00
Bantamweight	Claudio Iancu	def.	Kevin Caperna	Decision (split) (29–28, 28–29, 29–28)	3	5:00

== Cage Warriors 196 ==
Cage Warriors 196: London
- Promotion: Cage Warriors
- Date: November 15, 2025
- Venue: Indigo at The O2
- City: London, England

Cage Warriors 196: London was a mixed martial arts event promoted by Cage Warriors that took place on November 15, 2025, in London, England.

=== Background ===
A Cage Warriors Bantamweight Championship bout for the vacant title between Shirzad Qadrian and Elton Armindo was scheduled to headline the event. However, at the weigh-ins, both fighters were missed weight when Qadrian registered at 138.1 lbs, while Armindo came in heavier at 142.8 lbs. Therefore, the bout was subsequently cancelled.

As a results, a 160 pounds catchweight bout between former featherweight champion Jordan Vucenic and undefeated prospect Torpal Merjoev was promoted to new main event instead.

A Cage Warriors Featherweight Championship bout for the vacant title between Nik Bagley and Solomon Simon was scheduled to serve as the co-main event. Former champion Harry Hardwick vacated his title when he stepped in on short notice to face Kauê Fernandes at UFC Fight Night: Imavov vs. Borralho. However, Bagley withdrew from the bout and was replaced by Caique Araujo. At the weigh-ins, Araujo weighed in at 146.9 pounds, 1.9 pounds over the limit. As a result, Araujo was ineligible for the title and only Simon was eligible to win the vacant title.

=== Results ===
Main card (UFC Fight Pass)
Weight class				Method	Round	Time	Notes
Catchweight (160 lb)	Jordan Vucenic	def.	Torpal Merjoev	Decision (unanimous) (29–27, 30–27, 30–26)	3	5:00
Featherweight	Solomon Simon	def.	Caique Araujo	TKO (punches)	2	4:56	(Note: For the vacant Cage Warriors Featherweight Championship.)
Flyweight	Jawany Scott	def.	Michelangelo Lupoli	Submission (rear-naked choke)	2	4:25	(Note: Lupoli missed weight (128.7 lb).)
Bantamweight	Ollie Sarwa	def.	Tuomas Grönvall	Decision (unanimous) (30–27, 30–27, 30–27)	3	5:00
Catchweight (161 lb)	Tariq Pell	def.	Bruno Guimarães	Decision (unanimous) (30–27, 30–27, 30–26)	3	5:00
Lightweight	Marin Vetrila	def.	Thomas Paull	KO (punch to the body)	1	1:25
Bantamweight	Kadeem Perkins	def.	Ciaran Brady	KO (knee)	1	2:35

== Cage Warriors 197 ==
Cage Warriors 197: Unplugged
- Promotion: Cage Warriors
- Date: November 21, 2025
- Venue: BEC Arena
- City: Manchester, England

Cage Warriors 197: Unplugged was a mixed martial arts event promoted by Cage Warriors that took place on November 21, 2025, in Manchester, England.

=== Background ===
A Cage Warriors Lightweight Championship title unification bout between current champion Samuel Silva and interim title holder Omar Turgarev was scheduled to headline the event. However, Silva was forced to withdraw due to injury and Turgarev rescheduled to face Omiel Brown at Cage Warriors 198.

As a results, a featherweight bout between Damon Wilson and Aiden Lee was scheduled to serve as the new headliner. However, the bout was shifted to the co-main event when the event promoted as a welterweight bout between Anthony Orozco and Evaldo dos Santos to serve as the main event. In turn, Santos pulled out due to not being medically cleared and the bout was cancelled. Therefore, the bout between Lee and Wilson was promoted to new headliner again.

=== Results ===
Main card (UFC Fight Pass)
Weight class				Method	Round	Time	Notes
Featherweight	Aiden Lee	def.	Damon Wilson	Submission (rear-naked choke)	3	3:27
Welterweight	Giacomo Michelis	def.	Michael Dubois	Decision (unanimous) (29–28, 29–28, 29–28)	3	5:00
Light Heavyweight	Nell Ariano	def.	Riku Urholin	TKO (elbows and punches)	3	1:19
Featherweight	Giuseppe Mastrogiacomo	def.	Elton Armindo	Decision (unanimous) (30–27, 30–27, 30–27)	3	5:00
Bantamweight	Damiano Scogna	def.	Richard Kallos	TKO (elbows)	2	0:24
Welterweight	Manuel del Valle	def.	Pedro Henrique Dias	TKO (punches and elbows)	2	4:56
Preliminary card (YouTube / UFC Fight Pass)
Middleweight	Jordan O'Neill	def.	Mitchell Goode	Decision (unanimous) (29–28, 29–28, 29–28)	3	5:00
Lightweight	Marc-Philippe Ngatchou	def.	Yusuf Nazokatov	KO (spinning backfist)	2	0:12
Women's Flyweight	Katie Rychkova	def.	Eimear Darcy	TKO (elbows and punches)	3	3:20	(Note: Rychkova missed weight (126.4 lb).)
Flyweight	Jordan Molinari	def.	Redgie Hingston	Decision (unanimous) (30–27, 30–27, 30–27)	3	5:00

== Cage Warriors 198 ==
Cage Warriors 198: Manchester
- Promotion: Cage Warriors
- Date: November 22, 2025
- Venue: BEC Arena
- City: Manchester, England

Cage Warriors 198: Manchester was a mixed martial arts event promoted by Cage Warriors that took place on November 22, 2025, in Manchester, England.

=== Background ===
The event was headlined by an interim Cage Warriors Lightweight Championship bout between interim title holder Omar Turgarev and Omiel Brown.

=== Results ===
Main card (UFC Fight Pass)
Weight class				Method	Round	Time	Notes
Lightweight	Omiel Brown	def.	Omar Turgarev (ic)	Decision (unanimous) (49–46, 49–46, 49–46)	5	5:00	(Note: For the interim Cage Warriors Lightweight Championship.)
Lightweight	Chris Bungard	def.	Simone Patrizi	Decision (unanimous) (29–28, 29–28, 29–28)	3	5:00
Lightweight	Tim Wilde	def.	Oscar Ownsworth	Decision (unanimous) (29–28, 30–27, 30–27)	3	5:00
Bantamweight	Jack Humphries	def.	Joab Souza Silva	Technical Submission (rear-naked choke)	1	2:52
Lightweight	Shay Ingram	def.	Wellington Lopes	TKO (elbows and punches)	2	3:35
Flyweight	Fran Breen	def.	Ayoub Nacer	Decision (split) (29–28, 28–29, 29–28)	3	5:00	(Note: Breen missed weight (128.5 lb).)
Preliminary card (YouTube / UFC Fight Pass)
Bantamweight	Enrico Di Gangi	def.	Jack McLoughlin	Decision (unanimous) (29–28, 29–28, 29–28)	3	5:00
Catchweight (157 lb)	Roman David	def.	Christian Soda	Decision (unanimous) (30–27, 29–28, 29–28)	3	5:00
Featherweight	Oliver Tero	def.	Davide Manente	Submission (arm-triangle choke)	2	1:56
Catchweight (130 lb)	Nathanael Woods	def.	Matthew Friel	Decision (unanimous) (29–27, 29–27, 29–27)	3	5:00	(Note: Friel was deducted one point in round 3 due to an illegal knee.)
Welterweight	Chris Morris	def.	Theo Pino	Decision (unanimous) (30–27, 30–27, 30–26)	3	5:00

== Cage Warriors 199 ==
Cage Warriors 199: Newcastle
- Promotion: Cage Warriors
- Date: December 6, 2025
- Venue: Vertu Motors Arena
- City: Newcastle, England

Cage Warriors 199: Newcastle was a mixed martial arts event promoted by Cage Warriors that took place on December 6, 2025, in Newcastle, England.

=== Background ===
The event was headlined by an interim Cage Warriors Welterweight Championship bout between Sean Clancy Jr. and Melvin van Suijdam.

A Cage Warriors Flyweight Championship bout between current champion Shajidul Haque and Nicolas Leblond co-headlined the event.

=== Results ===
Main card (UFC Fight Pass)
Weight class				Method	Round	Time	Notes
Welterweight	Sean Clancy Jr.	def.	Melvin van Suijdam	KO (punches)	2	0:29	(Note: For the interim Cage Warriors Welterweight Championship.)
Flyweight	Nicolas Leblond	def.	Shajidul Haque (c)	Submission (rear-naked choke)	5	4:10	(Note: For the Cage Warriors Flyweight Championship.)
Lightweight	Daniel Konrad	def.	George Hardwick	Submission (flying armbar)	1	4:49
Lightweight	George Staines	def.	Ioan Harris	TKO (knee and punches)	2	2:20
Featherweight	Joshua Abraham	def.	Nicolas Barna	Submission (triangle choke)	1	3:54	(Note: Barna missed weight (148.4 lb).)
Lightweight	Adam Cullen	def.	Lucas Caio	Decision (unanimous) (29–27, 29–27, 29–27)	3	5:00	(Note: Cullen was deducted one point in round 1 due to an illegal kick to the head.)
Preliminary card (YouTube / UFC Fight Pass)
Light Heavyweight	Norbert Pietrzak	def.	Charles Joyner	TKO (punches)	1	1:37
Lightweight	Teddy Stringer	def.	Leandro Carmigo	TKO (elbows and punches)	1	2:50
Catchweight (140 lb)	Jack Foote	def.	Brennan Gait	Submission (rear-naked choke)	2	2:32
Flyweight	Joe Fields	def.	Railson Paixão	TKO (punches and elbows)	2	1:24
Lightweight	Ryan Campbell	def.	Faramorz Mohammad	Submission (reverse triangle armbar)	2	0:40
Bantamweight	Charlie Boulton	def.	Daniel Bainbridge	Decision (unanimous) (29–28, 29–28, 29–28)	3	5:00
Middleweight	Farshad Nazarnia	def.	Geoff Pavey	Submission (rear-naked choke)	1	3:50

== See also ==
- 2025 in UFC
- 2025 in Professional Fighters League
- 2025 in ONE Championship
- 2025 in Absolute Championship Akhmat
- 2025 in Konfrontacja Sztuk Walki
- 2025 in Legacy Fighting Alliance
- 2025 in Rizin Fighting Federation
- 2025 in LUX Fight League
- 2025 in Oktagon MMA
- 2025 in Brave Combat Federation
- 2025 in UAE Warriors
