= Mason Jones (fighter) =

Welsh mixed martial arts fighter (born 1995)

- Born: 26 April 1995 (age 31); Blaenavon, Wales
- Other names: The Dragon
- Height: 5 ft 10 in (1.78 m)
- Weight: 156 lb (71 kg; 11 st 2 lb)
- Division: Lightweight; Welterweight (2020)
- Reach: 74 in (188 cm)
- Fighting out of: Blaenavon, Wales
- Team: Celtic Pride MMA; Pedro Bessa BJJ
- Rank: Black belt in Brazilian Jiu Jitsu; Black belt in Judo; Black belt in Kickboxing
- Years active: 2017–present

Professional boxing record
- Total: 3
- Wins: 3
- Losses: 0

Mixed martial arts record
- Total: 22
- Wins: 18
- By knockout: 8
- By submission: 3
- By decision: 7
- Losses: 3
- By knockout: 1
- By decision: 2
- No contests: 1

Other information
- Boxing record from BoxRec
- Mixed martial arts record from Sherdog

Mason Jones (born 26 April 1995) is a Welsh mixed martial artist who currently competes in the Lightweight division of the Ultimate Fighting Championship (UFC). He is a former two-division Cage Warriors champion, holding the Lightweight and Welterweight championships simultaneously.

== Background ==
Mason Jones began martial arts at the age of 6, starting out with Kickboxing, before later incorporating Judo, Boxing, and Jiu-Jitsu. He was a top 5 National Judoka and a pro boxer, who went 3-0 before making a move into MMA. On his UFC profile, Jones says he is an avid Muay Thai and Taekwondo fighter.

== Mixed martial arts career ==
=== Early career ===
At the age of 16, Jones made his amateur MMA debut in Grapple and Strike, taking many years off before he was set again to appear in an amateur bout at 21. This was due to a series of pull-outs forcing him into another amateur fight. After a series of pullouts, David Adonis stepped up to fight Jones at Cage Warriors 83, with Jones winning via Kimura.

After fighting David Adonis, Jones made his pro debut. At Cage Warriors 87, he fought Shaun Luther, where he was able to submit Luther with a rear-naked choke with just twelve seconds of the fight remaining.

Wales’ first Arena MMA show was Cage Warriors 97, with Jones in the co-main event against Kacper Formela. Despite facing trouble early in the first round, he was able to land his jab and started to take control of the bout, before landing a jumping knee in the latter stages of the round, resulting in Jones ending the bout with a flurry of knees.

For the first time, Jones headlined Cage Warriors 108 on 12 October 2019 in Cardiff against Finnish Standout Aleksi Mäntykivi. He controlled the fight, resulting in judge scores of 30-25, 30-25, 30-26.

Jones was originally booked to fight former UFC fighter Danilo Belluardo at Cage Warriors 113, however, due to travel restrictions during the COVID-19 pandemic, Belluardo was unable to leave Italy and with Joe McColgan’s opponent also not being able to come into the country, they were matched against each other for the vacant Cage Warriors Lightweight Championship. During the fight, Jones had the advantage on the feet, and a flurry of knees from him once again forced a first round stoppage.

In September 2020, Jones faced Adam Proctor at Cage Warriors 116 for the vacant Cage Warriors Welterweight Championship. With another first round stoppage win, he became only the second two-division champion in Cage Warriors history, second only to Conor McGregor.

=== Ultimate Fighting Championship ===
Jones made his UFC debut against Mike Davis at UFC on ESPN 20 on 20 January 2021. He lost a close fight via unanimous decision. He earned a Fight of the Night bonus for his performance.

Jones faced Alan Patrick on 5 June 2021 at UFC Fight Night 189. In the second round, after being poked in the eye accidentally by Jones, Patrick was unable to continue and the bout was declared a No Contest.

A rematch with Patrick was scheduled for 23 October 2021 at UFC Fight Night 196. However, Patrick withdrew from bout and he was replaced by newcomer David Onama. Jones won the fight via unanimous decision.

Jones faced Ľudovít Klein, replacing Ignacio Bahamondes, on 23 July 2022 at UFC Fight Night 208. He lost the fight via unanimous decision.

In September 2022, it was reported that Jones had fought out his contract and elected not to re-sign with the organization.

=== Return to Cage Warriors ===
Returning to Cage Warriors, Jones faced Claudio Ribeiro on 29 July 2023 at Cage Warriors 158, winning the bout via TKO stoppage in the first round.

Jones faced Yann Liasse on 14 October 2023 at Cage Warriors 161, defeating him via TKO stoppage in the second round.

Jones faced Bryce Logan on 23 February 2024 at Cage Warriors 166, winning via TKO stoppage in the second round.

Jones faced Michael Pagani on 25 July 2024 at Cage Warriors 175, defeating him via unanimous decision.

=== Return to UFC ===
After four successive wins away from the promotion, on 23 February 2025, it was reported that Jones had re-signed to the UFC with a four-fight contract.

Jones faced Jeremy Stephens on 3 May 2025 at UFC on ESPN 67. He won the fight by unanimous decision.

Jones faced Bolaji Oki on 6 September 2025, at UFC Fight Night 258. He won the fight by technical knockout via elbows in the second round. This fight earned him his first Performance of the Night award.

Jones faced Axel Sola on 21 March 2026 at UFC Fight Night 270. He won the fight by unanimous decision. This fight earned him a $100,000 Fight of the Night award.

Jones faced MarQuel Mederos on August 22, 2026 at UFC Fight Night 285. He lost the fight via technical knockout in round two.

== Grappling career ==
Jones was scheduled to compete against Nathaniel Wood in a superfight at Polaris 27 on 23 March 2024. However, for unknown reasons, the bout did not take place.

== Championships and accomplishments ==
=== Mixed martial arts ===
- Ultimate Fighting Championship
  - Fight of the Night (Two times) vs. Mike Davis and Axel Sola
  - Performance of the Night (One time) vs. Bolaji Oki
- Cage Warriors
  - Cage Warriors Lightweight Championship (One time; former)
  - Cage Warriors Welterweight Championship (One time; former)
- MMAjunkie.com
  - 2021 January Fight of the Month vs. Mike Davis

== Mixed martial arts record ==
Professional record breakdown
22 matches	18 wins	3 losses
By knockout	8	1
By submission	3	0
By decision	7	2
No contests	1	

Res.	Record	Opponent	Method	Event	Date	Round	Time	Location	Notes
Loss	18–3 (1)	MarQuel Mederos	TKO (elbows and punches)	UFC Fight Night: Hernandez vs. Rodrigues	August 22, 2026	2	2:07	Sacramento, California, United States	
Win	18–2 (1)	Axel Sola	Decision (unanimous)	UFC Fight Night: Evloev vs. Murphy	21 March 2026	3	5:00	London, England	Fight of the Night.
Win	17–2 (1)	Bolaji Oki	TKO (elbows)	UFC Fight Night: Imavov vs. Borralho	6 September 2025	2	3:18	Paris, France	Performance of the Night.
Win	16–2 (1)	Jeremy Stephens	Decision (unanimous)	UFC on ESPN: Sandhagen vs. Figueiredo	3 May 2025	3	5:00	Des Moines, Iowa, United States	
Win	15–2 (1)	Michael Pagani	Decision (unanimous)	Cage Warriors 175	25 July 2024	3	5:00	Manchester, England	
Win	14–2 (1)	Bryce Logan	TKO (punches and knees)	Cage Warriors 166	23 February 2024	2	2:45	San Diego, California, United States	
Win	13–2 (1)	Yann Liasse	TKO (punches)	Cage Warriors 161	14 October 2023	2	4:24	Dublin, Ireland	
Win	12–2 (1)	Alexandre Ribeiro	TKO (punches)	Cage Warriors 158	29 July 2023	1	3:23	Rome, Italy	
Loss	11–2 (1)	Ľudovít Klein	Decision (unanimous)	UFC Fight Night: Blaydes vs. Aspinall	23 July 2022	3	5:00	London, England	
Win	11–1 (1)	David Onama	Decision (unanimous)	UFC Fight Night: Costa vs. Vettori	23 October 2021	3	5:00	Las Vegas, Nevada, United States	
NC	10–1 (1)	Alan Patrick	NC (accidental eye poke)	UFC Fight Night: Rozenstruik vs. Sakai	5 June 2021	2	2:14	Las Vegas, Nevada, United States	Accidental eye poke rendered Patrick unable to continue.
Loss	10–1	Mike Davis	Decision (unanimous)	UFC on ESPN: Chiesa vs. Magny	20 January 2021	3	5:00	Abu Dhabi, United Arab Emirates	Return to Lightweight. Fight of the Night.
Win	10–0	Adam Proctor	TKO (punches)	Cage Warriors 116	26 September 2020	1	4:31	Manchester, England	Welterweight debut. Won the vacant Cage Warriors Welterweight Championship.
Win	9–0	Joe McColgan	TKO (knee and punches)	Cage Warriors 113	20 March 2020	1	4:14	Manchester, England	Won the vacant Cage Warriors Lightweight Championship.
Win	8–0	Aleksi Mäntykivi	Decision (unanimous)	Cage Warriors 108	12 October 2019	3	5:00	Cardiff, Wales	
Win	7–0	Donovan Desmae	Decision (unanimous)	Cage Warriors 104	27 April 2019	3	5:00	Cardiff, Wales	
Win	6–0	Kacper Formela	TKO (knees to the body)	Cage Warriors 97	29 September 2018	1	4:03	Cardiff, Wales	
Win	5–0	Konmon Deh	Decision (unanimous)	Cage Warriors 95	21 July 2018	3	5:00	London, England	
Win	4–0	Craig Edwards	Submission (rear-naked choke)	Cage Warriors: Academy Wales 2	12 May 2018	3	3:23	Ebbw Vale, Wales	
Win	3–0	Lawrence Tracey	TKO (punches)	Cage Warriors 91	3 March 2018	2	1:41	Newport, Wales	
Win	2–0	Brett Hassett	Submission (kimura)	Adrenalin Fight Nights 15	9 December 2017	1	1:45	Swansea, Wales	
Win	1–0	Shaun Luther	Submission (rear-naked choke)	Cage Warriors 87	14 October 2017	3	4:48	Newport, Wales	Lightweight debut.

== See also ==
- List of current UFC fighters
- List of male mixed martial artists
