= Venetiaan =

Venetiaan (pronounced [veːneːtsiˈjaːn] or [veːneːˈtɕaːn]) is a Dutch surname. Notable people with the surname include:

- Jerrel Venetiaan (born 1971), Dutch kickboxer and mixed martial artist
- Ronald Venetiaan (1936–2025), Surinamese politician and president of Suriname
