= Dave van der Veen =

Dutch mixed martial arts fighter

- Born: Netherlands
- Other names: Popeye
- Nationality: Dutch
- Height: 5 ft 11 in (1.80 m)
- Weight: 233 lb (106 kg; 16.6 st)
- Division: Light Heavyweight; Heavyweight
- Team: Dolman Gym
- Years active: 1998 - 2002

Mixed martial arts record
- Total: 14
- Wins: 5
- By knockout: 3
- By submission: 1
- By disqualification: 1
- Losses: 9
- By knockout: 5
- By submission: 3
- By decision: 1

Other information
- Mixed martial arts record from Sherdog

Dave van der Veen is a Dutch mixed martial artist. He competed in the Light Heavyweight and Heavyweight divisions. He was a Dutch Power lifting champion and Shootfighter in RINGS.

== Mixed martial arts record ==
Professional record breakdown
14 matches	5 wins	9 losses
By knockout	3	5
By submission	1	3
By decision	0	1
By disqualification	1	0

Res.	Record	Opponent	Method	Event	Date	Round	Time	Location	Notes
Loss	5–9	Sander MacKilljan	TKO (3 knock downs)	2H2H 4: Simply the Best 4	March 17, 2002	0	N/A	Rotterdam, South Holland, Netherlands	
Loss	5–8	Cheick Kongo	TKO (punches)	Rings Holland: Some Like It Hard	December 2, 2001	2	1:25	Utrecht, Utrecht, Netherlands	
Loss	5–7	Roman Zentsov	TKO (punches)	2H2H 3: Hotter Than Hot	October 7, 2001	1	2:15	Rotterdam, South Holland, Netherlands	
Win	5–6	Edmunds Kirsis	DQ	Rings Holland: No Guts, No Glory	June 10, 2001	1	2:47	Amsterdam, North Holland, Netherlands	
Loss	4–6	Jerrel Venetiaan	Decision (unanimous)	Rings Holland: Di Capo Di Tutti Capi	June 4, 2000	2	5:00	Utrecht, Utrecht, Netherlands	
Win	4–5	Danny Rushton	TKO (knee and palm strikes)	Rings Holland: There Can Only Be One Champion	February 6, 2000	2	2:21	Utrecht, Utrecht, Netherlands	
Loss	3–5	Lee Hasdell	Submission (armbar)	TFKRG 5: Total Fight KRG 5	October 3, 1999	1	1:47	Buckinghamshire, England	
Loss	3–4	Masayuki Naruse	Submission (achilles lock)	Rings: Rise 1st	March 20, 1999	1	7:36	Japan	
Loss	3–3	Jerrel Venetiaan	TKO (punches)	Rings Holland: Judgement Day	February 7, 1999	2	2:40	Amsterdam, North Holland, Netherlands	
Loss	3–2	Hiromitsu Kanehara	Submission	RINGS - Mega Battle Tournament 1998: First Round	November 20, 1998	1	7:24	Osaka, Japan	
Win	3–1	Piet van Gammeren	TKO (cut)	Rings Holland: The Thialf Explosion	October 24, 1998	0	0:00	Heerenveen, Friesland, Netherlands	
Loss	2–1	Lee Hasdell	KO (palm strike)	Rings Holland: Who's The Boss	June 7, 1998	2	4:48	Utrecht, Utrecht, Netherlands	
Win	2–0	Johan Buur	Submission (rear naked choke)	Rings Holland: The King of Rings	February 8, 1998	1	1:54	Amsterdam, North Holland, Netherlands	
Win	1–0	Glen Brown	TKO (Retired)	U.T.F - Total Fight Night	October 5, 1997	2	N/A	Milton Keynes, England	

== See also ==
- List of male mixed martial artists
