= Martin Lazarov =

Bulgarian MMA fighter

- Born: Bulgaria
- Died: 15 July 2010
- Nationality: Bulgaria
- Division: Heavyweight (265 lb)
- Fighting out of: Bulgaria
- Years active: 2000 - 2001 (MMA)

Mixed martial arts record
- Total: 2
- Wins: 0
- Losses: 2
- By submission: 1
- By decision: 1

Other information
- Mixed martial arts record from Sherdog

Martin Lazarov was a retired Bulgarian mixed martial artist who competed in the Heavyweight division.

One round eye MMA Rings Russia was held in Ekaterinburg. He lost in the Submission (Guillotine Choke) at 1R 10:00 to Fedor Emelianenko. MMA two round eyes Rings Russia he lost in a decision (4-0 Points) at 1R 2:24 to Mikhail Ilyukhin.

== Mixed martial arts record ==
Professional record breakdown
| 2 matches | 0 wins | 2 losses |
| By knockout | 0 | 0 |
| By submission | 0 | 1 |
| By decision | 0 | 1 |

| Res. | Record | Opponent | Method | Event | Date | Round | Time | Location | Notes |
|---|---|---|---|---|---|---|---|---|---|
| Loss | 0-2 | Mikhail Ilyukhin | Decision (4-0 Points) | Rings Russia - Russia vs. Bulgaria | April 6, 2001 | 1 | 10:00 | Ekaterinburg, Russia | |
| Loss | 0-1 | Fedor Emelianenko | Submission (guillotine choke) | Rings Russia: Russia vs. Bulgaria | May 21, 2000 | 1 | 2:24 | Ekaterinburg, Sverdlovsk Oblast, Russia | |
