= Renaldo Rijkhoff =

Dutch mixed martial artist

- Born: Netherlands
- Nationality: Dutch
- Team: Nijman; Van Halderen
- Years active: 1999 - 2001

Mixed martial arts record
- Total: 5
- Wins: 2
- By knockout: 2
- Losses: 3
- By knockout: 3

Other information
- Mixed martial arts record from Sherdog

Renaldo Rijkhoff is a Dutch mixed martial artist.

== Mixed martial arts record ==
Professional record breakdown
5 matches	2 wins	3 losses
By knockout	2	3

Res.	Record	Opponent	Method	Event	Date	Round	Time	Location	Notes
Loss	2–3	Patrick de Witte	TKO	FFH: Free Fight Explosion 1	May 27, 2001	0	0:00	Beverwijk, North Holland, Netherlands	
Loss	2–2	Sander MacKilljan	KO (punch)	Rings Holland: Di Capo Di Tutti Capi	June 4, 2000	1	1:50	Utrecht, Netherlands	
Loss	2–1	Peter Verschuren	KO (knee)	Rings Holland: There Can Only Be One Champion	February 6, 2000	1	3:13	Utrecht, Netherlands	
Win	2–0	Rick Holshuizen	KO (punch)	Rings Holland: The Kings of the Magic Ring	June 20, 1999	2	1:12	Utrecht, Netherlands	
Win	1–0	Fred de Weerd	KO	FFH: Free Fight Gala	January 9, 1999	0	0:00	Beverwijk, North Holland, Netherlands	

== See also ==
- List of male mixed martial artists
