= Zaza Tkeshelashvili =

Georgian wrestler and mixed martial arts fighter

- Born: March 19, 1965 (age 61); Vani, Georgian SSR, Soviet Union
- Other names: Grom
- Nationality: Georgian
- Height: 6 ft 2 in (1.88 m)
- Weight: 244 lb (111 kg; 17.4 st)
- Division: Heavyweight
- Style: Freestyle Wrestling
- Team: Rings Georgia

Mixed martial arts record
- Total: 13
- Wins: 7
- By knockout: 5
- By submission: 2
- By decision: 2
- Losses: 6
- By knockout: 1
- By submission: 3

Other information
- Mixed martial arts record from Sherdog

Zaza "Grom" Tkeshelashvili (Georgian: ზაზა ტყეშელაშვილი; born March 19, 1965) is a Georgian retired freestyle wrestler and mixed martial artist who competed at the 1996 Summer Olympics. As an MMA fighter, he formerly competed in the heavyweight division, most of which he fought with Fighting Network RINGS where he was known as Zaza Grom. He holds notable wins over Volk Han and Travis Fulton, and has fought Bobby Hoffman and Renato Sobral. His brother Koba Tkeshelashvili is also mixed martial artist and has competed in RINGS.

== Biography ==
Zaza has been active in wrestling since 1978 as part of the Trudovije reserve center under coach Vano Nikoladze. He was one of eight wrestlers selected for the Georgian Olympic Team in 1996. In the 100 kg event he beat Daniel Sánchez (Cuba), was defeated by Leri Khabelov (Russia), and Dolgorsürengiin Sumyaabazar (Mongolia).

He is also mentioned in an interview with Australian fighter Chris Haseman where he comments on Zaza's (referring to him as Zaza Grom) Olympic credentials while telling a story of Rings Teams competitions, which were a 3 on 3 team eliminator event divided up by countries of origin. The rules were that the winner of the match stayed and fought the next member of a team.

"Well, the Georgians sent of Tariel Bitsadze, the team captain. So me being the Australian captain, picked Dan Higgins, he tapped out after about 30 seconds from a choke, so I then picked Troy (Haseman Chris' brother). He did exceptionally well, he lasted about a minute, he got knocked out, and then I looked around and I was the only one left. We were lucky that Bitsadze, being so big was getting tired, he had fought for a whole minute and a half. I was lucky enough to get around him he was like a huge tree, I hung onto his legs until he fell down, I jumped on him and choked him out. The crowd went nuts, I went nuts, until I turned around and here was his brother (Zaza). I got knocked out cold. The funny thing was that the entire tournament had to stop because the other two Georgian fighters didn’t even bother to get changed for the fight because they thought Bitsadze would clean house."*

- Paraphrased with some References, explanations and mistakes fixed (The Australian interviewer had issues spelling the Georgian names correctly.)

He is also a fully qualified veterinarian and physical education teacher both of which he still continues to do.

On October 28, 1999, Tkeshelashvili participated in RINGS'S first King of Kings tournament, being placed against luta livre fighter Renato Sobral in the first round. Zaza was the first and taking down his opponent and immediately attempted an ankle lock, following with a scarf hold when it failed. However, as they became entangled in the ring ropes, and after the restart Renato took his back, trying an armbar and an inverted triangle choke to no avail. At the second round, Zaza was caught in a Kimura lock and was forced to give up.

== Mixed martial arts record ==
Professional record breakdown
15 matches	9 wins	6 losses
By knockout	5	2
By submission	2	3
By decision	2	1

Res.	Record	Opponent	Method	Event	Date	Round	Time	Location	Notes
Loss	9–6	Volk Han	Submission (armlock)	Rings Lithuania: Bushido Rings 2	May 8, 2001	1	N/A	Vilnius, Lithuania	
Loss	9–5	Kiyoshi Tamura	Decision (unanimous)	Rings: King of Kings 2000 Block A	October 9, 2000	2	5:00	Tokyo, Japan	
Loss	9–4	Volk Han	Submission (guillotine choke)	Rings: Russia vs. Georgia	August 16, 2000	1	15:46	Tula, Russia	
Win	9–3	Travis Fulton	Submission (achilles lock)	Rings Russia: Russia vs. The World	May 20, 2000	1	0:34	Yekaterinburg, Russia	
Loss	8–3	Bobby Hoffman	KO (punch)	Rings: King of Kings 1999 Final	February 26, 2000	1	0:34	Tokyo, Japan	
Loss	8–2	Renato Sobral	Submission (kimura)	Rings: King of Kings 1999 Block A	October 28, 1999	2	1:11	Tokyo, Japan	
Win	8–1	Volk Han	KO	Rings: Rings Georgia	October 8, 1999	1	7:08	Georgia	
Win	7–1	Volk Han	Decision (unanimous)	Rings: Rise 4th	June 24, 1999	3	10:00	Japan	
Win	6–1	Sander Thonhauser	TKO (5 lost points)	Rings: Rise 2nd	April 23, 1999	1	4:02	Japan	
Win	5–1	Joop Kasteel	Submission	Rings: Third Fighting Integration	May 29, 1998	1	5:54	Tokyo, Japan	
Win	4–1	Ricardo Morais	Decision	Rings – Mega Battle Tournament 1997 Semifinal	December 23, 1997	1	20:00	Japan	
Win	3–1	Masayuki Naruse	KO (punch)	Rings – Budokan Hall 1997	January 22, 1997	N/A	N/A	Budokan Hall Tokyo, Japan	
Loss	2–1	Andrei Kopylov	KO (punch)	Rings – Battle Dimensions Tournament 1995 Opening Round	October 21, 1995	N/A	N/A	Japan	
Win	2–0	Yoshihisa Yamamoto	KO (punch)	Rings: Battle Dimensions Tournament 1994 Opening Round	October 23, 1994	N/A	N/A	Japan	
Win	1–0	Chris Dolman	KO (punch)	Rings: Battle Dimensions Tournament 1992 Opening Round	October 29, 1992	N/A	N/A	Japan	
