= Tommy Sauer =

American mixed martial arts fighter (1970–2020)

- Born: Thomas Sauer; November 11, 1970; Cleveland, Ohio, United States
- Died: March 24, 2020 (aged 49); Ocala, Florida, United States
- Other names: Trauma
- Height: 6 ft 1 in (1.85 m)
- Weight: 255 lb (116 kg; 18.2 st)
- Division: Heavyweight; Light Heavyweight
- Stance: Orthodox
- Fighting out of: Ocala, Florida, United States
- Years active: 1998–2012

Mixed martial arts record
- Total: 37
- Wins: 25
- By knockout: 11
- By submission: 13
- Unknown: 1
- Losses: 12
- By knockout: 10
- By submission: 2

Other information
- Mixed martial arts record from Sherdog

Thomas Sauer (November 11, 1970 — March 24, 2020) was an American mixed martial artist. A professional competitor from 1998 to 2012, he competed for RINGS and the World Fighting Alliance.

== Background ==
A native of Cleveland, Sauer moved with his family to Ocala, Florida in 1981 at the age of 11. From a young age, he began wrestling and karate.

== Mixed martial arts career ==
=== Early career ===
Having made his debut in 1998, Sauer quickly moved to 3–0 with a win over Jeff Monson before being handed his first professional defeat at the hands of Travis Fulton.

After five more wins followed by consecutive defeats to Bobby Hoffman and John Dixson, respectively, Sauer began competing for the RINGS promotion.

=== RINGS ===
Sauer made his RINGS debut on May 20, 2000, winning via first-round submission. After another win followed by a knockout of Valentijn Overeem, Sauer was defeated via doctor stoppage from a cut against Vladimir Matyushenko.

Sauer would go 6–5 in his next 11 fights before facing off against Enson Inoue at SuperBrawl 35 on April 16, 2004. Sauer won via first-round TKO in arguably the biggest win of his career.

=== Independent promotions ===
Sauer went 7–3 in the last ten fights of his career, last defeating Ruben Villareal via first-round submission in 2012.

== Personal life ==
Sauer founded his own gym, "Team Trauma" in 1998 in Ocala, Florida.

Sauer was a firefighter and EMT from 1996 until his retirement in 2019.

Sauer also had his own aluminum construction company in Ocala, FL.

Following his death in 2020, Sauer was inducted into the Florida MMA Hall of Fame.

In his community, he was famous for his heart and strength. He was said to constantly and without hesitation help friends and strangers alike, be it a conversation, meal, or surprise Christmas gifts. Sauer was married to Sherrie Sauer for 10 years with whom he built his home at the unexpected time of his death. Sauer had 4 children and 2 stepchildren.

He lived his life with Tourette Syndrome, and made light of the situation often. He would often make an off the wall or humorous statement then say that no one could be upset with him for it because no one would want to pick on the man with Tourette's. Living with the disorder was a struggle for him as a child, but ultimately led him to his professional fighting career. He found peace in the control fighting offered him.

Professional record breakdown
37 matches	25 wins	12 losses
By knockout	11	10
By submission	13	2
Unknown	1	0

Res.	Record	Opponent	Method	Event	Date	Round	Time	Location	Notes
Win	25–12	Ruben Villareal	Submission	R.F.C. 26: Legends Return	April 28, 2012	1	0:40	Ocala, Florida, United States	
Win	24–12	Jimmy Ambriz	TKO (punches)	AOF 13: Amaya vs. Lawrence	September 10, 2011	1	4:03	Estero, Florida, United States	
Win	23–12	Liron Wilson	TKO (punches)	AOF 7: Payday	April 3, 2010	2	0:54	Tampa, Florida, United States	
Loss	22–12	Marcio Cruz	TKO (punches)	AOF 4: Damage	August 22, 2009	2	3:43	Tampa, Florida, United States	
Win	22–11	Mike Hueser	Submission (rear-naked choke)	Southern Fight League: Smoky Mountain Brawl	May 9, 2009	1	2:52	Asheville, North Carolina, United States	
Win	21–11	Rocky Batastini	Submission (guillotine choke)	AOF 2: Rumble at Robarts 2	April 25, 2009	1	0:17	Sarasota, Florida, United States	
Win	20–11	Matt Thomas	Submission (armbar)	WEF: WEF 8	August 10, 2007	2	2:12	Kissimmee, Florida, United States	
Win	19–11	Leo Sylvest	TKO (submission to punches)	CFC 2: Combat Fighting Championship 2	September 23, 2006	1	0:13	Orlando, Florida, United States	
Loss	18–11	Branden Lee Hinkle	TKO (punches)	WEF: Sin City	May 20, 2005	1	2:19	Las Vegas, Nevada, United States	
Loss	18–10	Andy Montana	KO (punch)	IFC 20: Eve Of Destruction	March 5, 2005	1	1:29	Salt Lake City, Utah, United States	
Win	18–9	Enson Inoue	TKO (punches)	SB 35: SuperBrawl 35	April 16, 2004	1	4:14	Honolulu, Hawaii, United States	Return to Heavyweight.
Loss	17–9	Bill Mahood	TKO (punches and elbows)	IFC 17: Battleground Boise	October 25, 2003	2	3:10	Boise, Idaho, United States	
Win	17–8	Allan Sullivan	Submission (arm triangle choke)	IFC 16: Global Domination	September 6, 2003	2	0:39	Denver, Colorado, United States	
Win	16–8	Sean Gray	Submission (guillotine choke)	IFC 16: Global Domination	September 6, 2003	1	0:46	Denver, Colorado, United States	Light Heavyweight debut.
Win	15–8	Crafton Wallace	Submission (rear-naked choke)	WEFC 3: Shake	May 10, 2003	1	1:12	Jacksonville, Florida, United States	
Loss	14–8	Rodney Glunder	TKO (doctor stoppage)	RINGS Holland: One Moment In Time	December 1, 2002	2	3:52	Utrecht, Netherlands	
Loss	14–7	Marvin Eastman	TKO (elbows)	WFA 2: Level 2	July 5, 2002	2	1:35	Las Vegas, Nevada, United States	
Win	14–6	Bill Vucick	Submission (keylock)	WEF 12: World Extreme Fighting 12	May 11, 2002	2	2:30	Steubenville, Ohio, United States	
Win	13–6	Rob Morris	TKO (submission to punches)	RSF 6: Mayhem in Myers	December 29, 2001	1	0:35	Fort Myers, Florida, United States	
Loss	12–6	Hiromitsu Kanehara	TKO (punches)	RINGS: King of Kings 2000 Block B	December 22, 2000	1	4:14	Osaka, Japan	
Win	12–5	Andrei Kopylov	KO (punch)	RINGS: King of Kings 2000 Block B	December 22, 2000	1	0:10	Osaka, Japan	
Loss	11–5	Aaron Brink	TKO (punches)	RINGS USA: Rising Stars Final	September 30, 2000	2	4:29	Moline, Illinois, United States	
Loss	11–4	Vladimir Matyushenko	TKO (cut)	WEF: New Blood Conflict	August 26, 2000	2	2:17		
Win	11–3	Valentijn Overeem	KO (punches)	RINGS USA: Rising Stars Block B	July 22, 2000	1	0:35	Honolulu, Hawaii	
Win	10–3	Mike Dresch	KO (punches)	RINGS USA: Rising Stars Block B	July 22, 2000	1	0:13	Honolulu, Hawaii	
Win	9–3	Alexander Bezroutchkin	Submission (rear-naked choke)	RINGS Russia: Russia vs. The World	May 20, 2000	1	3:30	Yekaterinburg, Sverdlovsk Oblast, Russia	
Loss	8–3	John Dixson	Submission (heel hook)	WEF 7: Stomp in the Swamp	October 9, 1999	1	2:00	Kenner, Louisiana, United States	
Loss	8–2	Bobby Hoffman	Submission (guillotine choke)	EC 27: Extreme Challenge 27	August 21, 1999	1	4:46	Davenport, Iowa, United States	
Win	8–1	David Dodd	TKO (punches)	EC 27: Extreme Challenge 27	August 21, 1999	1	2:20	Davenport, Iowa, United States	
Win	7–1	Wade Rome	Submission (triangle choke)	WEF 5: World Extreme Fighting 5	June 12, 1999	0	0:00	DeLand, Florida, United States	
Win	6–1	John Horning	Submission (side choke)	XCC: Xtreme Combat Championships 2	June 8, 1999	0	0:00	Florida, United States	
Win	5–1	Victor Vincelette	TKO (injury)	WEF 2: World Extreme Fighting 2	February 21, 1999	1	0:10		
Win	4–1	Efrain Ruiz	TKO (submission to punches)	WEF 1: World Extreme Fighting 1	December 19, 1998	1	N/A		
Loss	3–1	Travis Fulton	TKO (submission to punches)	EC 21: Extreme Challenge 21	October 17, 1998	1	1:57	Hayward, Wisconsin, United States	
Win	3–0	Jeff Monson	Submission (rear-naked choke)	EC 20: Extreme Challenge 20	August 22, 1998	1	3:47	Davenport, Iowa, United States	
Win	2–0	David Giannotti	Submission (choke)	WVF: Orlando 2	July 25, 1998	1	1:13	Orlando, Florida, United States	
Win	1–0	Joe Campanella	N/A	EC 19: Extreme Challenge 19	June 20, 1998	1	0:34	Hayward, Wisconsin, United States	

== See also ==
- List of male mixed martial artists
