= Peter Verschuren =

Dutch mixed martial arts fighter

- Born: Netherlands
- Other names: big red machine
- Weight: 230 lb (100 kg; 16 st)
- Division: Heavyweight
- Team: Team Hardcore
- Years active: 1985-2008

Mixed martial arts record
- Total: 12
- Wins: 6
- By knockout: 6
- Losses: 6
- By knockout: 1
- By submission: 3
- By decision: 1
- Unknown: 1

Peter Verschuren is a retired Dutch mixed martial artist. He competed in the Heavyweight division.

== Mixed martial arts record ==
Professional record breakdown
8 matches	2 wins	6 losses
By knockout	2	1
By submission	0	3
By decision	0	1
Unknown	0	1

Res.	Record	Opponent	Method	Event	Date	Round	Time	Location	Notes
Loss	2–6	Joop Kasteel	DQ	It's Showtime: Amsterdam Arena	June 8, 2003	1	5:00	Amsterdam, North Holland, Netherlands	
Loss	2–5	Michael Knaap	Submission (leglock)	2H2H 6: Simply the Best 6	March 16, 2003	1	3:26	Rotterdam, South Holland, Netherlands	
Loss	2–4	Antoni Hardonk	TKO (doctor stoppage)	Rings Holland: Heroes Live Forever	January 28, 2001	1	3:05	Utrecht, Netherlands	
Loss	2–3	Alistair Overeem	Submission (americana)	It's Showtime: Christmas Edition	December 12, 2000	1	1:06	Haarlem, North Holland, Netherlands	
Loss	2–2	Rob van Esdonk	Submission (scarf-hold armlock)	Rings Holland: Di Capo Di Tutti Capi	June 4, 2000	1	2:41	Utrecht, Netherlands	
Win	2–1	Renaldo Rijkhoff	KO (knee)	Rings Holland: There Can Only Be One Champion	February 6, 2000	1	3:13	Utrecht, Netherlands	
Loss	1–1	Piet van Gammeren	Decision (unanimous)	Rings Holland: The Kings of the Magic Ring	June 20, 1999	3	3:00	Utrecht, Netherlands	
Win	1–0	Herman van Tol	TKO (3 knockdowns)	IMA: Mix Fight Gala	January 31, 1999	N/A	N/A	Landsmeer, North Holland, Netherlands	

== See also ==
- List of male mixed martial artists
