= Sander MacKilljan =

Dutch MMA fighter

- Born: Netherlands
- Nationality: Dutch
- Height: 6 ft 8 in (203 cm)
- Weight: 244 lb (111 kg; 17 st 6 lb)
- Division: Heavyweight
- Team: Vos Gym
- Years active: 1997 - 2004

Mixed martial arts record
- Total: 16
- Wins: 8
- By knockout: 5
- By submission: 2
- Unknown: 1
- Losses: 7
- By knockout: 2
- By submission: 3
- By decision: 1
- Unknown: 1
- No contests: 1

Other information
- Mixed martial arts record from Sherdog

Sander MacKilljan is a Dutch mixed martial artist. He competed in the Heavyweight division.

== Mixed martial arts record ==
Professional record breakdown
16 matches	8 wins	7 losses
By knockout	5	2
By submission	2	3
By decision	0	1
By disqualification	1	1
No contests	1	

Res.	Record	Opponent	Method	Event	Date	Round	Time	Location	Notes
Loss	8–7 (1)	Ibragim Magomedov	Submission	2H2H: 2 Hot 2 Handle	February 22, 2004	1	1:31	Amsterdam, Netherlands	
Win	8–6 (1)	Andre Tete	DQ (headbutt)	It's Showtime: As Usual	September 29, 2002	1	1:01	Haarlem, Netherlands	
Loss	7–6 (1)	Dave Vader	Submission (keylock)	Rings Holland: Saved by the Bell	June 2, 2002	2	4:02	Amsterdam, North Holland, Netherlands	
Win	7–5 (1)	Dave van der Veen	TKO (3 knock downs)	2H2H 4: Simply the Best 4	March 17, 2002	0	N/A	Rotterdam, Netherlands	
Loss	6–5 (1)	Ricardo Fyeet	DQ (refused to break)	It's Showtime: Original	October 2001	1	0:56	Haarlem, North Holland, Netherlands	
Loss	6–4 (1)	Herman van Tol	Submission (keylock)	Rings Holland: Heroes Live Forever	January 28, 2001	1	2:08	Utrecht, Netherlands	
Win	6–3 (1)	Michael Krom	Submission (toe hold)	It's Showtime: Christmas Edition	December 12, 2000	1	1:02	Haarlem, North Holland, Netherlands	
Win	5–3 (1)	Renaldo Rijkhoff	KO (punch)	Rings Holland: Di Capo Di Tutti Capi	June 4, 2000	1	1:50	Utrecht, Netherlands	
Win	4–3 (1)	Lee Macguinness	TKO (punches)	Rings Holland: There Can Only Be One Champion	February 6, 2000	1	2:11	Utrecht, Netherlands	
Loss	3–3 (1)	Barrington Patterson	KO (punch)	It's Showtime: It's Showtime	October 24, 1999	1	2:51	Haarlem, North Holland, Netherlands	
Loss	3–2 (1)	Big Mo T	KO (punch)	Rings Holland: The Kings of the Magic Ring	June 20, 1999	1	1:39	Utrecht, Netherlands	
Win	3–1 (1)	Rick Holshuizen	KO	Rings Holland: The Thialf Explosion	October 24, 1998	0	0:00	Heerenveen, Netherlands	
Loss	2–1 (1)	Hiromitsu Kanehara	Decision	Rings: Fourth Fighting Integration	June 27, 1998	1	3:26	Tokyo, Japan	
Win	2–0 (1)	Pedro Palm	KO (knee)	Rings Holland: The King of Rings	February 8, 1998	1	2:13	Amsterdam, North Holland, Netherlands	
NC	1–0 (1)	Herman van Tol	No Contest	FFH: Free Fight Gala	December 21, 1997	0	0:00	Beverwijk, North Holland, Netherlands	
Win	1–0	Erwin van de Eijnden	Submission (rear naked choke)	Rings Holland: Utrecht at War	June 29, 1997	1	1:46	Utrecht, Netherlands	

== See also ==
- List of male mixed martial artists
