= 2000 in Fighting Network Rings =

Mixed martial arts events

Information
- First date: February 6, 2000
- Last date: December 22, 2000

Events
- Total events: 18

Fights
- Total fights: 170
- Title fights: 1

Chronology
1999 in RINGS	2000 in Fighting Network Rings	2001 in RINGS

The year 2000 is the sixth year in the history of Fighting Network Rings, a mixed martial arts promotion based in Japan. In 2000 Fighting Network Rings held 18 events beginning with, Rings Holland: There Can Only Be One Champion.

== Title fights ==
Title fights in 2000
Weight class				Method	Round	Time	Event	Notes
Openweight	Gilbert Yvel	def.	Kiyoshi Tamura (c)	TKO (Punches)	1	13:13	Rings: Millennium Combine 1	(Note: For The Fighting Network Rings Openweight Championship.)

== Events list ==
#	Event title	Date	Arena	Location
55	Rings: King of Kings 2000 Block B	December 22, 2000	Osaka Prefecture Gymnasium	Osaka, Japan
54	Rings Australia: Free Fight Battle	November 12, 2000	Alexandra Hills Hotel	Brisbane, Australia
53	Rings Lithuania: Bushido Rings 1	October 24, 2000	Vilnius Palace of Concerts and Sports	Vilnius, Lithuania
52	Rings: King of Kings 2000 Block A	October 9, 2000	Yoyogi National Stadium Gym 2	Tokyo, Japan
51	Rings USA: Rising Stars Final	September 30, 2000	The Mark of the Quad Cities	Moline, Illinois
50	Rings: Battle Genesis Vol. 6	September 5, 2000	Korakuen Hall	Tokyo, Japan
49	Rings: Millennium Combine 3	August 23, 2000	Osaka Prefecture Gymnasium	
48	Rings: Russia vs. Georgia	August 16, 2000	Tula Circus	Tula, Russia
47	Rings USA: Rising Stars Block B	July 22, 2000	Neal S. Blaisdell Center	Honolulu, Hawaii
46	Rings USA: Rising Stars Block A	July 15, 2000	McKay-Dee Hospital Center	Orem, Utah
45	Rings: Millennium Combine 2	June 15, 2000	Yoyogi National Stadium Gym 2	Tokyo, Japan
44	Rings Holland: Di Capo Di Tutti Capi	June 4, 2000	Vechtsebanen Sport Hall	Utrecht, Netherlands
43	Rings Russia: Russia vs. Bulgaria	May 21, 2000		Tula, Russia
42	Rings Russia: Russia vs. The World	May 20, 2000	Yekaterinburg Sports Palace	Yekaterinburg, Sverdlovsk Oblast, Russia
41	Rings: Millennium Combine 1	April 20, 2000	Yoyogi National Stadium Gym 2	Tokyo, Japan
40	Rings Australia: NR 4	March 19, 2000	Alexandra Hills Hotel	Brisbane, Australia
39	Rings: King of Kings 1999 Final	February 26, 2000	Nippon Budokan	Tokyo, Japan
38	Rings Holland: There Can Only Be One Champion	February 6, 2000	Vechtsebanen Sport Hall	Utrecht, Netherlands

== Rings Holland: There Can Only Be One Champion ==
Rings Holland: There Can Only Be One Champion was an event held on February 6, 2000 at The Vechtsebanen Sport Hall in Utrecht, Netherlands.

=== Results ===
Main Card
Weight class				Method	Round	Time	Notes
	Gilbert Yvel	def.	Joop Kasteel	KO (Palm Strikes)	1	4:16
	Peter Verschuren	def.	Renaldo Rijkhoff	KO (Knee)	1	3:13
	Hiromitsu Kanehara	def.	Valentijn Overeem	KO (Punch)	1	4:14
	Alistair Overeem	def.	Chris Watts	TKO (Knee to the Body)	1	3:58
	Willie Peeters	def.	Yasuhito Namekawa	TKO (Knee to the Body)	2	4:56
	Sander MacKilljan	def.	Lee Macguinness	TKO (Punches)	1	2:11
	Rob van Esdonk	def.	Big Mo T	TKO (Knee to the Body)	1	4:58
	Brian Lo-A-Njoe	def.	Jeffrey Heijm	Decision (Unanimous)	2	5:00
	Dave van der Veen	def.	Danny Rushton	TKO (Knee and Palm Strikes)	2	2:21
	Sjaak van Ijsden	def.	Herman Maree	KO (Punch)	1	3:33
	Melvin Geutskens	def.	Willy Lagerweij	Submission (Armbar)	1	3:24

== Rings: King of Kings 1999 Final ==
Rings: King of Kings 1999 Final was an event held on February 26, 2000 at The Nippon Budokan in Tokyo, Japan.

=== Results ===
Main Card
Weight class				Method	Round	Time	Notes
	Dan Henderson	def.	Renato Sobral	Decision (Majority)	2	5:00
	Chris Haseman	def.	Brad Kohler	Submission (Kimura)	1	1:11
	Renato Sobral	def.	Kiyoshi Tamura	Decision (Majority)	2	5:00
	Dan Henderson	def.	Antônio Rodrigo Nogueira	Decision (Split)	3	5:00
	Bobby Hoffman	def.	Zaza Tkeshelashvili	KO (Punch)	1	0:34
	Kiyoshi Tamura	def.	Renzo Gracie	Decision (Unanimous)	2	5:00
	Antônio Rodrigo Nogueira	def.	Andrei Kopylov	Decision (Majority)	2	5:00
	Dan Henderson	def.	Gilbert Yvel	Decision (Unanimous)	2	5:00
	Renato Sobral	def.	Mikhail Ilyukhin	Submission (Armbar)	3	0:40

== Rings Australia: NR 4 ==
Rings Australia: NR 4 was an event held on March 19, 2000 at The Alexandra Hills Hotel in Brisbane, Australia.

=== Results ===
Main Card
Weight class				Method	Round	Time	Notes
	Chris Haseman	def.	Yasuhito Namekawa	Submission (Guillotine Choke)	1	6:50
	David Frendin	def.	Danny Higgins	Submission (Neck Crank)	1	7:26
	Maynard Marcum	def.	Sean Kelly	Submission (Rear Naked Choke)	1	1:13
	Sam Nest	def.	Haydn Pollard	TKO	1	1:15
	Tim Thomas	def.	Noah Magnus	TKO	1	5:22
	Derek Ferrari	def.	Daryl Naumann	Submission (Ankle Lock)	1	3:34
	Joe Neurauter	def.	Damon Paine	Submission (Arm Lock)	1	3:23
	Kelly Jacobs	def.	Warwick Dawes	Decision	1	10:00
	Mark Williams	vs.	D Man	Draw	1	10:00
	Joe Perry	vs.	Mark Rebbettes	Draw	1	10:00
	Glen Barnett	def.	Gary King	TKO	1	5:30
	Stuart Ashby	def.	Duncan Downham	Submission (Arm Lock)	1	8:00

== Rings: Millennium Combine 1 ==
Rings: Millennium Combine 1 was an event held on April 20, 2000 at The Yoyogi National Stadium Gym 2 in Tokyo, Japan.

=== Results ===
Main Card
Weight class				Method	Round	Time	Notes
Openweight	Gilbert Yvel	def.	Kiyoshi Tamura (c)	TKO (Punches)	1	13:13	(Note: For The Fighting Network Rings Openweight Championship.)
	Jeremy Horn	def.	Yoshihisa Yamamoto	Submission (Arm-Triangle Choke)	2	2:50
	Ricardo Arona	def.	Andrei Kopylov	Decision (Unanimous)	2	5:00
	Renato Sobral	def.	Travis Fulton	Submission (Armbar)	1	4:49
	Bobby Hoffman	def.	Borislav Jeliazkov	KO (Punch)	1	8:00
	Wataru Sakata	def.	Branden Lee Hinkle	Submission (Leg Lock)	1	7:23
	Alistair Overeem	def.	Yasuhito Namekawa	Submission (Armbar)	1	0:45

== Rings Russia: Russia vs. The World ==
Rings Russia: Russia vs. The World was an event held on May 20, 2000 at The Yekaterinburg Sports Palace in Yekaterinburg, Sverdlovsk Oblast, Russia.

=== Results ===
Main Card
Weight class				Method	Round	Time	Notes
	Andrei Kopylov	def.	Carlos Clayton	Submission (Armbar)	1	0:55
	Yuriy Kochkine	def.	Alistair Overeem	Decision (Split)	2	5:00
	Magomedkhan Gamzatkhanov	def.	Yasuhito Namekawa	Decision	3	5:00
	Tommy Sauer	def.	Alexander Bezroutchkin	Submission (Rear-Naked Choke)	1	3:30
	Mikhail Ilyukhin	def.	Lee Hasdell	Decision	3	5:00
	Renato Sobral	def.	Jacob Zobnin	Submission (Rear-Naked Choke)	1	3:20
	Achmed Labasanov	def.	Valentijn Overeem	Submission (Achilles Lock)	1	3:50
	Zaza Tkeshelashvili	def.	Travis Fulton	Submission (Achilles Lock)	1	1:20
	Borislav Jeliazkov	def.	Igor Perminov	KO (Knee to the Body)	1	1:15
	Iouri Bekichev	def.	Chris Haseman	KO (Punch)	1	2:30

== Rings Russia: Russia vs. Bulgaria ==
Rings Russia: Russia vs. Bulgaria was an event held on May 21, 2000 in Tula, Russia. This card featured the MMA debut of future Pride Heavyweight Champion and MMA superstar, Fedor Emelianenko.

=== Results ===
Main Card
Weight class				Method	Round	Time	Notes
	Magomedkhan Gamzatkhanov	def.	Cvetko Cvetkov	Submission (Achilles Lock)	1	0:00
	Borislav Jeliazkov	def.	David Safarov	Submission (Choke)	1	0:00
	Mikhail Ilyukhin	def.	Emil Kristev	Submission (Achilles Lock)	1	0:00
	Fedor Emelianenko	def.	Martin Lazarov	Submission (Guillotine Choke)	1	2:24
	Bazigit Atajev	def.	Vasilin Bazhirov	TKO (Punches)	1	0:00
	Victor Yerohin	def.	Valentin Davidov	N/A	1	0:00
	Achmed Labasanov	def.	Kozhedar Baladiev	Submission (Armbar)	1	0:00
	Aleksander Ivanov	def.	Alexei Motorin	Decision	2	0:00
	Yuriy Kochkine	def.	Roman Kostennikov	Decision	2	0:00
	Andrey Pashkin	def.	Oleg Danilevsky	Decision	2	0:00

== Rings Holland: Di Capo Di Tutti Capi ==
Rings Holland: Di Capo Di Tutti Capi was an event held on June 4, 2000 at The Vechtsebanen Sport Hall in Utrecht, Netherlands.

=== Results ===
Main Card
Weight class				Method	Round	Time	Notes
	Semmy Schilt	def.	Yoshihisa Yamamoto	KO (Knee and Punch)	1	2:54
	Rob van Esdonk	def.	Peter Verschuren	Submission (Scarf Hold Armlock)	1	2:41
	Joop Kasteel	def.	Lee Hasdell	TKO (Shoulder Injury)	1	1:18
	Jerrel Venetiaan	def.	Dave van der Veen	Decision (Unanimous)	2	5:00
	Big Mo T	def.	Glenn Brasdorp	DQ	1	1:23
	Valentijn Overeem	def.	Fatih Kocamis	KO (Punch)	2	0:47
	Aziz Karaoglu	def.	Roberto Flamingo	Submission (Armbar)	1	1:50
	Stephan Tapilatu	def.	Jeffrey Heijm	Decision (Unanimous)	2	5:00
	Sander MacKilljan	def.	Renaldo Rijkhoff	KO (Punch)	1	1:50
	Fred van Doesburg	def.	Rick Rootlieb	Submission (Smother)	1	4:18
	Brian Lo-A-Njoe	def.	Jassier Kaderi	KO (Punches)	1	2:12

== Rings: Millennium Combine 2 ==
Rings: Millennium Combine 2 was an event held on June 15, 2000 at The Yoyogi National Stadium Gym 2 in Tokyo, Japan.

=== Results ===
Main Card
Weight class				Method	Round	Time	Notes
	Renato Sobral	def.	Hiromitsu Kanehara	Decision (Unanimous)	2	5:00
	Magomedkhan Gamzatkhanov	def.	Branden Lee Hinkle	Submission (Arm Triangle Choke)	1	8:11
	Bobby Hoffman	def.	Alistair Overeem	KO (Punch)	1	9:39
	Roberto Traven	def.	Gueorguiev Tzvetkov	Decision (Majority)	2	5:00
	Valentijn Overeem	def.	Brad Kohler	Submission (Kneebar)	1	0:31
	Ryuki Ueyama	vs.	Dave Menne	Draw	2	5:00

== Rings USA: Rising Stars Block A ==
Rings USA: Rising Stars Block A was an event held on July 15, 2000 at The McKay-Dee Hospital Center in Orem, Utah.

=== Results ===
Main Card
Weight class				Method	Round	Time	Notes
	Tsuyoshi Kosaka	def.	Greg Wikan	Submission (Toe Hold)	1	2:53
	Bobby Hoffman	def.	Aaron Brink	Submission (Neck Crank)	1	3:12
	Chris Haseman	def.	Jermaine Andre	Submission (Toe Hold)	1	1:23
	Tsuyoshi Kosaka	def.	Travis Fulton	Decision (Unanimous)	3	5:00
	Greg Wikan	def.	Craig Montgomery	Submission (Guillotine Choke)	1	4:19
	Aaron Brink	def.	Harry Moskowitz	TKO (Punches)	1	0:47
	Bobby Hoffman	def.	Victor Burtsev	TKO (Punches)	1	3:13
	Chris Haseman	def.	Matt Frost	Submission (Armbar)	1	0:30
	Jermaine Andre	def.	Clint Wiggins	Submission (Keylock)	1	0:57
	Griffen Reynaud	def.	Trent Jenkins	Submission (Keylock)	1	2:27
	Jeremy Horn	def.	Keith Mielke	KO (Punches)	1	1:47

== Rings USA: Rising Stars Block B ==
Rings USA: Rising Stars Block B was an event held on July 22, 2000 at The Neal S. Blaisdell Center in Honolulu, Hawaii.

=== Results ===
Main Card
Weight class				Method	Round	Time	Notes
	Eric Pele	def.	Roger Neff	Decision (Unanimous)	2	5:00
	Tommy Sauer	def.	Valentijn Overeem	KO (Punches)	1	0:35
	Yasuhito Namekawa	def.	Chris Munsen	Decision (Majority)	2	5:00
	Hiromitsu Kanehara	def.	Josh Hall	Decision (Split)	2	5:00
	Roger Neff	def.	Rocky Batastini	Submission (Choke)	1	2:13
	Eric Pele	def.	Wesley Correira	Submission (Armbar)	2	2:30
	Tommy Sauer	def.	Mike Dresch	KO (Punches)	1	0:13
	Valentijn Overeem	def.	Tuli Kulihaapai	Submission (Armbar)	1	2:05
	Chris Munsen	def.	Dave Menne	Decision	2	5:00
	Yasuhito Namekawa	def.	Falaniko Vitale	Submission (Guillotine Choke)	2	0:27
	Hiromitsu Kanehara	def.	Adrian Serrano	Submission (Armlock)	1	2:07

== Rings: Russia vs. Georgia ==
Rings: Russia vs. Georgia was an event held on August 16, 2000 at The Tula Circus in Tula, Russia.

=== Results ===
Main Card
Weight class				Method	Round	Time	Notes
	Magomedkhan Gamzatkhanov	def.	Zaza Tkeshelashvili	Submission (Guillotine Choke)	1	15:46
	Mikhail Ilyukhin	def.	Bakouri Gogitidze	Submission (Ankle Lock)	1	7:25
	Achmed Labasanov	def.	Vepcho Bardanashvili	Submission (Achilles Lock)	1	1:28
	Fedor Emelianenko	def.	Levon Lagvilava	Submission (Rear-Naked Choke)	1	7:24
	Ameran Bitsadze	def.	Andrey Reznik	TKO	1	2:24
	Gega Gegeshidze	def.	Achmed Sagidgusenov	Decision	1	20:00
	Victor Yerohin	def.	Levon Ebanoidze	TKO (Corner Threw in the Towel)	1	5:24
	Ilja Tlashadze	def.	Vasiliy Gorbonos	TKO	1	10:10
	Tengiz Tedoradze	def.	Roman Kostennikov	Submission (Guillotine Choke)	1	7:30
	Egidijus Valavicius	def.	Denis Baykov	TKO	1	13:30

== Rings: Millennium Combine 3 ==
Rings: Millennium Combine 3 was an event held on August 23, 2000 at The Osaka Prefectural Gymnasium in Osaka, Japan. It pitted Fighting Network Rings fighters against fighters competing in World Extreme Fighting and was dubbed "RINGS VS. WEF."

=== Results ===
Main Card
Weight class				Method	Round	Time	Notes
	Kiyoshi Tamura	def.	Pat Miletich	Decision (Majority)	2	5:00
	Tsuyoshi Kosaka	vs.	Antônio Rodrigo Nogueira	Draw	2	5:00
	Valentijn Overeem	def.	Joe Slick	Submission (Achilles Lock)	1	0:36
	Ricardo Arona	def.	Jeremy Horn	Decision (Split)	2	5:00
	Dan Severn	def.	Andrei Kopylov	Decision (Unanimous)	2	5:00
	Matt Hughes	def.	Chris Haseman	Decision (Unanimous)	2	5:00

== Rings: Battle Genesis Vol. 6 ==
Rings: Battle Genesis Vol. 6 was an event held on September 5, 2000 at Korakuen Hall in Tokyo, Japan.

=== Results ===
Main Card
Weight class				Method	Round	Time	Notes
	Gustavo Machado	def.	Wataru Sakata	TKO (Cut)	1	1:35
	Takehiro Murahama	def.	Gabe Lemley	TKO (Kimura)	1	7:13
	Naoyuki Kotani	def.	Tashiro Nishiuchi	Submission (Armbar)	1	0:32
	Fedor Emelianenko	def.	Hiroya Takada	KO (Punches)	1	0:12
	Tashiro Nishiuchi	def.	Tomotsugu Fujiwara	Decision (Unanimous)	2	5:00
	Naoyuki Kotani	def.	Kiyohito Sugata	TKO (Cut)	1	0:42

== Rings USA: Rising Stars Final ==
Rings USA: Rising Stars Final was an event held on September 30, 2000 at The Mark of the Quad Cities in Moline, Illinois.

=== Results ===
Main Card
Weight class				Method	Round	Time	Notes
	Bobby Hoffman	def.	Aaron Brink	Submission (Punches)	1	1:34
	Jeremy Horn	def.	Chris Haseman	Submission (Armbar)	1	2:36
	Travis Fulton	def.	Greg Wikan	Submission (Armbar)	1	3:48
	Nate Schroeder	def.	Jack Nilson	Submission (Kneebar)	1	0:36
	Matt Hughes	def.	Robbie Newman	Submission (Arm-Triangle Choke)	1	1:40
	Aaron Brink	def.	Tommy Sauer	TKO (Punches)	2	4:29
	Bobby Hoffman	def.	Eric Pele	Decision (Unanimous)	3	5:00
	Chris Haseman	def.	Yasuhito Namekawa	Submission (Kimura)	1	1:30
	Jeremy Horn	def.	Josh Hall	Submission (Kneebar)	1	3:50
	Jermaine Andre	def.	Adrian Serrano	KO (Kick)	1	2:29

== Rings: King of Kings 2000 Block A ==
Rings: King of Kings 2000 Block A was an event held on October 9, 2000 at The Yoyogi National Stadium Gym 2 in Tokyo, Japan.

=== Results ===
Main Card
Weight class				Method	Round	Time	Notes
	Antônio Rodrigo Nogueira	def.	Kiyoshi Tamura	Submission (Armbar)	2	2:29
	Randy Couture	def.	Ryushi Yanagisawa	Decision (Majority)	2	5:00
	Valentijn Overeem	def.	Renato Sobral	Submission (Toe Hold)	1	2:19
	Dave Menne	def.	Roberto Traven	Decision (Unanimous)	3	5:00
	Kiyoshi Tamura	def.	Zaza Tkeshelashvili	Decision (Unanimous)	2	5:00
	Antônio Rodrigo Nogueira	def.	Achmed Labasanov	Submission (Armbar)	1	1:38
	Ryushi Yanagisawa	def.	Borislav Jeliazkov	Submission (Toe Hold)	1	3:45
	Randy Couture	def.	Jeremy Horn	Decision (Unanimous)	3	5:00
	Renato Sobral	def.	Tariel Bitsadze	Submission (Armbar)	1	2:58
	Valentijn Overeem	def.	Suren Balachinskiy	TKO (Strikes)	1	2:13
	Dave Menne	def.	Wataru Sakata	Decision (Unanimous)	2	5:00
	Roberto Traven	def.	Mikhail Borissov	Decision (Unanimous)	2	5:00

== Rings Lithuania: Bushido Rings 1 ==
Rings Lithuania: Bushido Rings 1 was an event held on October 24, 2000 at The Vilnius Palace of Concerts and Sports in Vilnius, Lithuania.

=== Results ===
Main Card
Weight class				Method	Round	Time	Notes
	Oleg Menshov	def.	Roman Gaiko	Submission (Rear-Naked Choke)	1	N/A
	Mikhail Ilyukhin	def.	Valentin Golubovskij	Submission (Arm Lock)	1	N/A
	Victor Yerohin	def.	Kestutis Smirnovas	Submission (Leg Lock)	1	8:00
	Bazigit Atajev	def.	Arunas Juskevicius	KO (Punches)	1	N/A
	Egidijus Valavicius	def.	Achmed Sagidgusenov	Submission (Armbar)	1	N/A
	Remigijus Kazaciunas	def.	Andrey Pashkin	TKO (Punches)	1	N/A

== Rings Australia: Free Fight Battle ==
Rings Australia: Free Fight Battle was an event held on November 12, 2000 at The Alexandra Hills Hotel in Brisbane, Australia.

=== Results ===
Main Card
Weight class				Method	Round	Time	Notes
	Chris Haseman	def.	Joe Slick	Decision	1	10:00
	Matt Hughes	def.	Maynard Marcum	Submission (Keylock)	1	6:29
	Ryuki Ueyama	def.	Tim Thomas	Submission (Ankle Lock)	1	9:11
	Kelly Jacobs	def.	Nick Tolewski	Submission (Armbar)	1	2:15
	Tsuyoshi Morikage	def.	Stephen Gillinder	Submission (Choke)	1	10:00
	Shaun Price	def.	Chad Jappe	Submission	1	2:09
	Sam Nest	def.	Sean Kelly	Submission (Keylock)	1	4:15
	Masashi Sugano	def.	Joe Perry	Submission	1	6:18
	Daryl Naumann	def.	Warwick Dawes	N/A	1	10:00
	Glen Barnett	def.	Haydn Pollard	Submission (Triangle)	1	2:48

== Rings: King of Kings 2000 Block B ==
Rings: King of Kings 2000 Block B was an event held on December 22, 2000 at The Osaka Prefecture Gymnasium in Osaka, Japan.

=== Results ===
Main Card
Weight class				Method	Round	Time	Notes
	Yoshihisa Yamamoto	def.	Chris Haseman	TKO (Strikes)	1	3:51
	Tsuyoshi Kosaka	def.	Fedor Emelianenko	TKO (Doctor Stoppage)	1	0:17
	Hiromitsu Kanehara	def.	Tommy Sauer	TKO (Punches)	1	4:14
	Magomedkhan Gamzatkhanov	def.	Bobby Hoffman	Decision (Unanimous)	3	5:00
	Yoshihisa Yamamoto	def.	Ameran Bitsadze	Submission (Armbar)	1	4:39
	Chris Haseman	def.	Carlos Barreto	Decision (Unanimous)	2	5:00
	Tsuyoshi Kosaka	def.	Mikhail Ilyukhin	KO (Punches)	2	1:53
	Fedor Emelianenko	def.	Ricardo Arona	Decision (Unanimous)	3	5:00
	Hiromitsu Kanehara	def.	Alexandre Ferreira	Submission (Kimura)	2	2:45
	Tommy Sauer	def.	Andrei Kopylov	KO (Punch)	1	0:10
	Magomedkhan Gamzatkhanov	def.	Lee Hasdell	TKO (Punches)	2	0:08
	Bobby Hoffman	def.	Joop Kasteel	KO (Punches)	1	0:43

== See also ==
- Fighting Network Rings
- List of Fighting Network Rings events
