= Mikhail Ilyukhin =

Russian sambist, professional wrestler and mixed martial arts fighter

- Born: November 21, 1966 (age 59); Tula, Russian SFSR, Soviet Union (now Russia)
- Nationality: Russian
- Height: 5 ft 9 in (1.75 m)
- Weight: 205 lb (93 kg; 14.6 st)
- Division: Light Heavyweight
- Style: MMA; Sambo
- Team: Russian Top Team
- Years active: 1994–2005

Mixed martial arts record
- Total: 56
- Wins: 36
- By knockout: 1
- By submission: 33
- By decision: 2
- Losses: 19
- By knockout: 7
- By submission: 12
- Draws: 1

Other information
- Mixed martial arts record from Sherdog

Mikhail Ilyukhin (born November 21, 1966) is a retired Russian mixed martial artist and professional wrestler who competed in the light heavyweight division. He competed in both Fighting Network Rings, and Pride Fighting Championships, and was a prominent member of Russia Top Team, where he trained with the likes of Volk Han, Fedor Emelianenko, and Sergei Kharitonov. At Pride 26, Ilyukhin lost by stoppage to Quinton Jackson. He won his last fight at K-1 – Hero's Lithuania against Jordanas Poskaitis on November 26, 2005. It appears that following the demise of the Russia Top Team Ilyukhin has retired.

== Career ==
=== IAFC & RINGS ===
After a successful career in sambo, Ilyukhin debuted in the professional wrestling promotion Rings in 1994, submitting Mitsuya Nagai in his first match. He would become a part of the Rings Russia team, along with Volk Han, Andrei Kopylov and Nikolai Zouev. One year later, he had his first contact in MMA represented Rings Russia in the International Absolute Fighting Council (IAFC)'s Absolute Fighting Eurasian Championship. He won the event tournament by submitting six opponents on a row, five of them by Achilles hold and in roughly one minute each.

Only three months after, he returned to IAFC for a similar format, and his performance seemed to follow close. He made short work of his first two opponents with an armbar and a guillotine choke, submitted kickboxer Igor Vovchanchyn by digging his chin into Igor's eye from dominant position, and skipped a match when teammate Achmed Sagidgusenov threw the fight for him. However, at the finals Ilyukhin would meet Brazilian jiu-jitsu exponent Ricardo Morais, an apprentice of Carlson Gracie who outweighed Mikhail by almost 70 Ib. The Russian unexpectedly dominated the first segments of the match, hitting repeated headbutts and punches through Morais's guard until swelling shut one of his eyes, but he made the mistake of standing up, and it allowed the Brazilian to sweep him and take his back. After a long series of elbow strikes to Ilyukhin's spine, Morais locked a rear naked choke and got the win.

Despite the loss, the bout against Morais gained him fame in the Brazilian vale tudo scene, and he got a spot in the first event of Universal Vale Tudo Fighting, which was coincidentally hosted in Japan. He faced another against another Carlson Gracie trainee, the debutant Carlos Barreto, still heavier yet more similar to him in weight. The bout ended in the second round with Ilyukhin submitted again by rear naked choke. Months after, Ilyukhin participated in Shoot Boxing's MMA S-Cup event and was pitted against capoeira fighter Mestre Hulk, who was known for his tournament victory against Brazilian jiu-jitsu world champion Amaury Bitetti. The Russian won the match using the already known chin submission.

Back in Rings, Ilyukhin had a vale tudo rules match in 1996 against Adilson Lima, a Carlos Gracie, Jr. trainee who had been famously defeated twice by Vovchanchyn in the first IAFC tournament. The match started slow, with Lima taking down Illukhin and mounting him, but the Russian escaped thanks to a failed rear naked choke attempt. Illyukhin gained a yellow card by illegally grabbing the ropes in order not to be taken down again, yet he managed to take down the Brazilian himself and almost finished him with an ankle hold before the end of the time. The match was declared a draw, but Lima and his cornermen Renzo Gracie protested the result and demanded another round, which Rings chairman Akira Maeda and referee Yuji Shimada eventually had to concede. The fight was restarted for a heated contest, as Lima attacked Illyukhin at the handshake and grabbed the ropes himself while Mikhail threw an illegal headbutt, and it featured yet another controversial moment when Shimada stopped the match to a submission win for Lima before Illyukhin surrendered.

Mikhail returned to MMA format in 1999 facing Ultimate Fighting Championship Heavyweight Champion Randy Couture. The American, as a decorated wrestler, managed to stop Ilyukhin's insistent takedowns and push him against the ring ropes, almost making him fall through them at one point. After brawling on the clinch for most of the match, Illyukhin secured an arm with his back against the turnbuckle and dropped for a Kimura lock, but the referee intervened to reposition them on the center of the ring. In the process, the Russian visibly advanced the hold, and once restarted the fight, he completed it and Couture was forced to tap out. The win was immediately contested by Couture, but nothing come out of the complain.

In 1999, Ilyukhin was selected to compete in Rings' first MMA tournament, King of Kings 1999. He defeated his two first opponents, Tito Ortiz's teammate Justin McCully and HOOKnSHOOT tournament winner Brad Kohler, and then faced luta livre fighter Renato Sobral at the block's finals. The bout saw Sobral earning a yellow card for intentionally throwing Mikhail over the top rope, as well as the Russian attempting takedowns and boxing in order to try to hold his own. After the judges ruled a draw, an overtime was called; Mikhail performed a standing Kimura lock entry, but Sobral skillfully reversed it to an armbar and got the win. Ilyukhin also took part in the next edition of the tournament in 2000, facing Tsuyoshi Kohsaka in the first round. Although the bout looked to be back and forth, Kohsaka landed a striking combination in the second round which knocked Mikhail out, eliminating him from the event.

=== Pride ===
Ilyukhin took part in a special match against Quinton Jackson in Pride Fighting Championships in 2003. He was heavily challenged for the bout, finding himself outweighed by an excess of 60 lb and being also 12 years older than Jackson, but he chose to fight nonetheless. Initially, the Russian was successful in bringing Jackson to the ground and threatening him with submissions, including a Kimura that almost succeeded, but his opponent powered out and started scoring strikes. Ilyukhin was knocked down and gained a yellow card for crawling under the ropes, and received further hits in his next attempt to go to the ground. Ultimately, after avoiding a triangle choke by the Russian, Jackson gained side control and threw knees to the head and liver, making Ilyukhin tap out.

== After retirement ==
After retirement Ilyukhin became prezident of Tula regional public organization "Sambo Federation" and was included into coaching stuff of Russian sambo team. Ilyukhin was awarded the title of Honored Coach of the Russian Federation in 2014 and at the same year he founded "Sport club of Ilyukhin" in Tula

== Championships and accomplishments ==
- Fighting Network Rings
  - 1997 Rings Mega Battle Tournament Runner up
  - 2001 Rings Openweight Championship Tournament semifinalist
- International Absolute Fighting Council
  - IAFC Absolute Fighting Eurasian Championship Tournament Winner
  - IAFC Absolute Fighting Championship Tournament Runner Up
- World Sambo Championships
  - Russian sambo championship 1995 gold medalist
  - World sambo championship 1995 bronze medalist

== Mixed martial arts record ==
Professional record breakdown
42 matches	30 wins	11 losses
By knockout	0	2
By submission	28	9
By decision	2	0
Draws	1	

Res.	Record	Opponent	Method	Event	Date	Round	Time	Location	Notes
Win	30–12–1	Jordanas Poskaitis	Submission (half boston crab)	Hero's Lithuania 2005	November 26, 2005	N/A		Vilnius, Lithuania	
Win	29–12–1	Petrov Kolev	Submission (heel hook)	Rings Russia: CIS vs. The World	August 20, 2005	1		Lithuania	
Loss	28–12–1	Quinton Jackson	Submission (knee to the body)	Pride 26	June 8, 2003	1	6:26	Yokohama, Japan	
Win	28–11–1	Katsuhisa Fujii	Submission (guillotine choke)	PC: Premium Challenge	May 6, 2002	1	5:45	Tokyo, Japan	
Draw	27–11–1	Hiromitsu Kanehara	Draw	Rings: World Title Series Grand Final	February 15, 2002	3	5:00	Yokohama, Japan	
Loss	27–11	Bobby Hoffman	TKO (corner stoppage)	Rings: 10th Anniversary	August 11, 2001	2	5:00	Tokyo, Japan	
Win	27–10	Borislav Jeliazkov	Submission (armbar)	Rings Lithuania: Bushido Rings 2	June 15, 2001	2	2:06	Yokohama, Japan	
Win	26–10	Kestutis Smirnovas	Submission (achilles lock)	Rings Lithuania: Bushido Rings 2	May 8, 2001	1		Lithuania	
Win	25–10	Martin Lazarev	Decision (4-0 points)	Rings Russia: Russia vs. Bulgaria	April 6, 2001	1	10:00	Ekaterinburg, Russia	
Loss	24–10	Tsuyoshi Kohsaka	KO (punches)	Rings: King of Kings 2000 Block B	December 22, 2000	2	1:53	Osaka, Japan	
Win	24–9	Valerijus Golubovskis	Submission (armbar)	Rings Lithuania: Bushido Rings 1	October 24, 2000	N/A		Lithuania	
Win	23–9	Bakouri Gogitidze	Submission (Achilles lock)	Rings: Russia vs. Georgia	August 16, 2000	1	7:25	Russia	
Wik	22–9	Emil Kristev	Submission (Achilles Lock)	Rings Russia: Russia vs. Bulgaria	May 21, 2000	1	0:00	Tula, Russia	
Win	21–9	Lee Hasdell	Decision	Rings Russia: Russia vs. The World	May 20, 2000	3	5:00	Ekaterinburg, Russia	
Loss	20–9	Renato Sobral	Submission (armbar)	Rings: King of Kings 1999 Final	February 26, 2000	3	0:40	Tokyo, Japan	
Win	20–8	Brad Kohler	Submission (armbar)	Rings: King of Kings 1999 Block A	October 28, 1999	1	2:16	Tokyo, Japan	
Win	19–8	Justin McCully	Technical Submission (achilles lock)	Rings: King of Kings 1999 Block A	October 28, 1999	1	4:48	Tokyo, Japan	
Loss	18–8	Bakouri Gogitidze	Submission (rear-naked choke)	Rings: Rings Georgia	October 8, 1999	1	5:07	Georgia, United States	
Win	18–7	Joop Kasteel	Submission (achilles lock)	Rings: Rise 3rd	May 22, 1999	1	9:40	Japan	
Win	17–7	Randy Couture	Submission (kimura)	Rings: Rise 1st	March 20, 1999	1	7:43	Tokyo, Japan	
Win	16–7	Masayuki Naruse	Submission	Rings: Third Fighting Integration	May 29, 1998	1	13:52	Tokyo, Japan	
Loss	15–7	Kiyoshi Tamura	Submission	Rings: Battle Dimensions Tournament 1997 Final	January 21, 1998	1	18:12	Tokyo, Japan	
Win	15–6	Volk Han	Submission	Rings: World Mega Battle Tournament 1997: Semi-Finals	December 23, 1997	1	9:36	Fukuoka, Japan	
Win	14–6	Tsuyoshi Kohsaka	Submission	Rings: World Mega Battle Tournament 1997: Second Round	November 20, 1997	1	14:16	Osaka, Japan	
Win	13–6	Masayuki Naruse	Submission (Achilles lock)	Rings: Mega Battle Tournament 1997 Semifinal 1	October 25, 1997	1	12:28	Tokyo, Japan	
Loss	12–6	Tsuyoshi Kohsaka	Submission	Rings : Mega Battle Tournament 1996: Grand Final	January 22, 1997	1	10:04	Tokyo, Japan	
Loss	12–5	Kiyoshi Tamura	Submission	Rings: Battle Dimensions Tournament 1996 Opening Round	October 25, 1996	1	14:40	Nagoya, Japan	
Loss	12–4	Adilson Lima	Submission (armbar)	Rings: Maelstrom 6	August 24, 1996	1	24:52	Tokyo, Japan	
Win	12–3	Mestre Hulk	Submission (chin to the eye)	Shoot Boxing: S-Cup 1996	July 14, 1996	1	6:59	Japan	
Loss	11–3	Carlos Barreto	Submission (rear-naked choke)	UVF 1: Universal Vale Tudo Fighting 1	April 5, 1996	2	3:15	Japan	
Loss	11–2	Mitsuya Nagai	KO (strikes)	Rings: Maelstrom 1	March 25, 1996	1	11:24	Niigata, Japan	
Win	11–1	Wataru Sakata	Submission	Rings: Budokan Hall 1996	January 24, 1996	1	10:44	Tokyo, Japan	
Loss	10–1	Ricardo Morais	Submission (rear-naked choke)	IAFC: Absolute Fighting Championship 1	November 25, 1995	1	9:44	Moscow, Russia	
Win	10–0	Achmed Sagidgusenov	Submission (achilles lock)	IAFC: Absolute Fighting Championship 1	November 25, 1995	1	0:05	Moscow, Russia	
Win	9–0	Igor Vovchanchyn	Submission (chin to the eye)	IAFC: Absolute Fighting Championship 1	November 25, 1995	1	6:30	Moscow, Russia	
Win	8–0	Andrei Besedin	Submission (guillotine choke)	IAFC: Absolute Fighting Championship 1	November 25, 1995	1	1:21	Moscow, Russia	
Win	7–0	Zagil Eribinov	Submission (armbar)	IAFC: Absolute Fighting Championship 1	November 25, 1995	1	1:35	Moscow, Russia	
Win	6–0	Nikolai Zouev	Submission	Rings: Battle Dimensions Tournament 1995 Opening Round	October 21, 1995	1	12:27	Fukuoka, Japan	
Win	5–0	Victor Yerohin	Submission (rear-naked choke)	IAFC: Absolute Fighting Eurasian Championship	July 1, 1995	1	3:54	Moscow, Russia	
Win	4–0	Leonid Efremov	Submission (achilles lock)	IAFC: Absolute Fighting Eurasian Championship	July 1, 1995	1	1:09	Moscow, Russia	
Win	3–0	Vadim Shevchenko	Submission (achilles lock)	IAFC: Absolute Fighting Eurasian Championship	July 1, 1995	1	0:08	Moscow, Russia	
Win	2–0	Maxim Tarasov	Submission (achilles lock)	IAFC: Absolute Fighting Eurasian Championship	July 1, 1995	1	0:41	Moscow, Russia	
Win	1–0	Piotr Tjernov	Submission (achilles lock)	IAFC: Absolute Fighting Eurasian Championship	July 1, 1995	1	0:36	Moscow, Russia	
