= Rob van Esdonk =

Dutch kickboxer and MMA fighter

- Born: 25 October 1964 (age 61); Den Bosch, Netherlands
- Height: 1.98 m (6 ft 6 in)
- Weight: 97.0 kg (213.8 lb; 15.27 st)
- Division: Heavyweight
- Style: Thaiboxing
- Stance: Orthodox
- Team: Van Deutekom Gym; Vos Gym
- Years active: 1997 - 2005 (MMA)

Mixed martial arts record
- Total: 7
- Wins: 4
- By knockout: 3
- By submission: 1
- Losses: 3
- By knockout: 2
- By submission: 1

Other information
- Mixed martial arts record from Sherdog

Rob van Esdonk (born 25 October 1964) is a Dutch former kickboxer and mixed martial artist who competed in the heavyweight division.

== Kickboxing career ==
=== Notable Bouts ===
- In 1993 Rob fought Peter Aerts for For the WMTA World Heavyweight Championship and lost by knockout in the 4th round.

- In 1994 Rob rematched Peter in the K-1 Grand Prix '94, Quarter Finals and lost by knockout in the 3rd round.

- In 1994 Rob fought Andy Hug in the event K-1: Legend for the UKF World Super Heavyweight Championship and lost by knockout in the 4th round.

- In 1997 Rob fought Pedro Rizzo in the event Nikko T. Press Productions: Battle of the Best, Semi Finals and lost by 3rd-round knockout

- In 1998 Rob fought Achille Roger in K-1 Fight Night '98, Quarter Finals and lost by 4th-round knockout.

- In 1998 Rob fought Xhavit Bajrami in K-1 Fight Night '98, Semi Finals and won by a first-round knockout(doctor stoppage).

- In 1998 Rob fought Stefan Leko in K-1 Fight Night '98, Final for the K-1 Fight Night '98 Tournament Championship and lost by KO (punches) in the 3rd round.

- In 1999 Rob fought Jérôme Le Banner in the event Les Stars du Ring and lost by a first round ko.

== Mixed martial arts record ==
Professional record breakdown
7 matches	4 wins	3 losses
By knockout	3	2
By submission	1	1

Res.	Record	Opponent	Method	Event	Date	Round	Time	Location	Notes
Loss	4–3	Peter Mulder	TKO (knees and punches)	Rings Holland: Armed and Dangerous	April 3, 2005	1	1:03	Utrecht, Netherlands	
Win	4–2	Andre Tete	TKO (punches)	Rings Holland: Born Invincible	December 12, 2004	1	0:43	Alytus, Alytus County, Lithuania	
Loss	3–2	Andre Tete	KO (punch)	Rings Holland: Some Like It Hard	December 2, 2001	2	0:28	Utrecht, Netherlands	
Win	3–1	Peter Verschuren	Submission (scarf hold armlock)	Rings Holland: Di Capo Di Tutti Capi	June 4, 2000	1	2:41	Utrecht, Netherlands	
Win	2–1	Big Mo T	TKO (knee to the body)	Rings Holland: There Can Only Be One Champion	February 6, 2000	1	4:58	Utrecht, Netherlands	
Loss	1–1	Tsuyoshi Kosaka	Submission (heel hook)	Rings Holland: The King of Rings	February 8, 1998	2	0:57	Amsterdam, North Holland, Netherlands	
Win	1–0	Dennis Crouweel	TKO (referee stoppage from a broken nose)	Rings Holland: The Final Challenge	February 2, 1997	1	2:38	Amsterdam, North Holland, Netherlands	

== See also ==
- List of male mixed martial artists
