= Joop Kasteel =

Dutch MMA fighter

- Born: 27 August 1964 (age 62); Amersfoort, Netherlands
- Other names: De Zwarte Parel (the black pearl)
- Height: 1.91 m (6 ft 3 in)
- Weight: 120 kg (265 lb; 18 st 13 lb)
- Division: Heavyweight
- Style: Kickboxing
- Stance: Orthodox
- Fighting out of: Netherlands
- Rank: Mike's Gym; Team Hardcore
- Years active: 1995–present

Mixed martial arts record
- Total: 32
- Wins: 19
- By knockout: 8
- By submission: 8
- By decision: 1
- By disqualification: 1
- Unknown: 1
- Losses: 13
- By knockout: 8
- By submission: 4
- Unknown: 1

Other information
- Mixed martial arts record from Sherdog

Joop Kasteel, also known as "de zwarte parel" ("the black pearl", born 27 August 1964), is a Dutch former mixed martial artist. He made his mixed martial arts debut on 15 June 1996. He is a veteran of the RINGS promotion and as he has fought the majority of his fights for them.

Kasteel's trainers were Chris Dolman, Hans Nijman and Michel van Halderen he also stated he trained with "Dirty" Bob Schrijber. As a former bodybuilder he went into the MMA world and became one of the most popular Dutch fighters noted for his power and physique, normally weighing in at around 265 lbs.

== Mixed martial arts record ==
Professional record breakdown
32 matches	19 wins	13 losses
By knockout	8	8
By submission	8	4
By decision	1	0
By disqualification	1	0
Unknown	1	1

Res.	Record	Opponent	Method	Event	Date	Round	Time	Location	Notes
Win	19–13	Dan Severn	KO (knee & punches)	Rings Holland: Men of Honor	11 December 2005	1	0:46	Netherlands	
Loss	18–13	Cheick Kongo	KO (punch)	Rings Holland: World's Greatest	4 April 2004	1		Netherlands	
Win	18–12	Peter Verschuren	DQ	It's Showtime 2003 Amsterdam	8 June 2003	2	5:00	Netherlands	
Loss	17–12	Jerrel Venetiaan	KO (punches)	2H2H 6: Simply the Best 6	16 March 2003	1	6:28	Netherlands	
Win	17–11	Dave Vader	Submission (scarf hold)	Rings Holland: One Moment In Time	1 December 2002	1		Netherlands	
Win	16–11	Barrington Renford Patterson	Submission (neck crank)	It's Showtime – As Usual / Battle Time	29 September 2002	1		Netherlands	
Loss	15–11	Paul Cahoon	Submission (exhausation)	2H2H 4: Simply the Best 4	17 March 2002			Netherlands	
Win	15–10	Fatih Kocamis	Submission (armlock)	Rings Holland: Some Like It Hard	2 December 2001	1	1:57	Netherlands	
Win	14–10	Hubert Numrich	Submission (armlock)	BOA 3: Battle of Arnhem 3	23 September 2001	1		Netherlands	
Loss	13–10	Paul Cahoon	KO (punch)	Rings Holland: No Guts, No Glory	10 June 2001	2		Netherlands	
Win	13–9	Roman Zentsov	Submission (shoulder lock)	MillenniumSports: Veni Vidi Vici	22 April 2001			Netherlands	
Win	12–9	Yuriy Kochkine	Decision (unanimous)	Rings Holland: Heroes Live Forever	28 January 2001	2	5:00	Netherlands	
Loss	11–9	Bobby Hoffman	KO (punches)	Rings: King of Kings 2000 Block B	22 December 2000	1	0:43	Osaka, Japan	
Win	11–8	Lee Hasdell	TKO (shoulder injury)	Rings Holland: Di Capo Di Tutti Capi	4 June 2000	1	1:18	Netherlands	
Loss	10–8	Gilbert Yvel	KO (palm strikes)	Rings Holland: There Can Only Be One Champion	6 February 2000	1	4:16	Netherlands	
Loss	10–7	Tariel Bitsadze	TKO	Rings: Rings Georgia	8 October 1999	1	4:11	Georgia, United States	
Loss	10–6	Kiyoshi Tamura	Submission (armbar)	Rings: Rise 5th	19 August 1999	2	2:17	Japan	
Win	10–5	Tariel Bitsadze	Submission (keylock)	Rings: Rise 4th	24 June 1999	1	6:01	Japan	
Loss	9–5	Mikhail Ilyukhin	Submission (achilles lock)	Rings: Rise 3rd	22 May 1999	1	9:40	Japan	
Loss	9–4	Yoshihisa Yamamoto	TKO (palm strikes)	Rings: Rise 2nd	23 April 1999	1	7:32	Japan	
Win	9–3	Henk Kuipers	KO (palm strikes)	Rings Holland: Judgement Day	7 February 1999	1		Netherlands	
Win	8–3	Masayuki Naruse	TKO	Rings: World Mega Battle Tournament	23 December 1998	1	8:33	Japan	
Win	7–3	Herman van Tol	KO (kick to the body)	Rings Holland: Who's the Boss	7 June 1998			Netherlands	
Loss	6–3	Zaza Tkeshelashvili	Submission	Rings: Third Fighting Integration	29 May 1998	1	5:54	Tokyo, Japan	
Win	6–2	Ameran Bitsadze	Submission (arm triangle choke)	Rings Holland: The King of Rings	8 February 1998	1	2:15	Netherlands	
Loss	5–2	Kiyoshi Tamura	KO	Rings: Battle Dimensions Tournament 1997 Final	21 January 1998				
Win	5–1	Lee Hasdell	Submission (headlock)	Rings: Mega Battle Tournament 1997 Semifinal 1	25 October 1997	1	8:55	Japan	
Loss	4–1	Pete Williams	TKO (knee injury)	Rings: Extension Fighting 7	26 September 1997	1	8:25	Japan	
Win	4–0	Pedro Palm	KO (palm strikes)	Rings Holland: Utrecht at War	29 June 1997	1		Netherlands	
Win	3–0	Mitsuya Nagai	TKO (lost points)	Rings: Extension Fighting 2	22 April 1997	1	6:27	Japan	
Win	2–0	Mitsuya Nagai	KO (punches)	Rings Holland: The Final Challenge	2 February 1997	1	5:12	Netherlands	
Win	1–0	Rusky Rodgers	N/A	Fight Gala: Mix Fight Night	15 June 1996			Netherlands	
