= 1998 in Fighting Network Rings =

Mixed martial arts events

Information
- First date: January 21, 1998
- Last date: December 23, 1998

Events
- Total events: 9

Fights
- Total fights: 57
- Title fights: 2

Chronology
1997 in RINGS	1998 in Fighting Network Rings	1999 in RINGS

The year 1998 is the fourth year in the history of Fighting Network Rings, a mixed martial arts promotion based in Japan. In 1998 Fighting Network Rings held nine events beginning with, Rings: Battle Dimensions Tournament 1997 Final.

== Title fights ==
Title fights in 1998
Weight class				Method	Round	Time	Event	Notes
	Kiyoshi Tamura	def.	Mikhail Ilyukhin	N/A	0	0:00	Rings: Battle Dimensions Tournament 1997 Final	(Note: For The Fighting Network Rings Openweight Championship.)
	Tariel Bitsadze	def.	Kiyoshi Tamura (c)	TKO	1	3:39	Rings: Third Fighting Integration	(Note: For The Fighting Network Rings Openweight Championship.)

== Events list ==
#	Event title	Date	Arena	Location
25	Rings: World Mega Battle Tournament	December 23, 1998		Japan
24	Rings Holland: The Thialf Explosion	October 24, 1998	Thialf Stadion Heerenveen	Holland
23	Rings Australia: NR2	September 13, 1998		Australia
22	Rings: Fourth Fighting Integration	June 27, 1998		Tokyo, Japan
21	Rings Holland: Who's the Boss	June 7, 1998	Vechtsebanen Sport Hall	Utrecht, Netherlands
20	Rings: Third Fighting Integration	May 29, 1998		Tokyo, Japan
19	Rings Russia: Russia vs. Holland	April 25, 1998		Yekaterinburg, Russia
18	Rings Holland: The King of Rings	February 8, 1998	Sport Hall Zuid	North Holland, Netherlands
17	Rings: Battle Dimensions Tournament 1997 Final	January 21, 1998		

== Rings: Battle Dimensions Tournament 1997 Final ==
Rings: Battle Dimensions Tournament 1997 Final was an event held on January 21, 1998.

=== Results ===
Main Card
Weight class				Method	Round	Time	Notes
	Kiyoshi Tamura	def.	Mikhail Ilyukhin	N/A	0	0:00	(Note: For The Fighting Network Rings Openweight Championship.)
	Akira Maeda	def.	Magomedkhan Gamzatkhanov	N/A	0	0:00
	Mikhail Ilyukhin	def.	Magomedkhan Gamzatkhanov	N/A	0	0:00
	Kiyoshi Tamura	def.	Akira Maeda	N/A	0	0:00
	Magomedkhan Gamzatkhanov	def.	Dick Vrij	N/A	0	0:00
	Mikhail Ilyukhin	def.	Tsuyoshi Kosaka	N/A	0	0:00
	Kiyoshi Tamura	def.	Joop Kasteel	N/A	0	0:00
	Akira Maeda	def.	Mitsuya Nagai	N/A	0	0:00

== Rings Holland: The King of Rings ==
Rings Holland: The King of Rings was an event held on February 8, 1998, at Sporthallen Zuid in Amsterdam, North Holland, Netherlands.

=== Results ===
Main Card
Weight class				Method	Round	Time	Notes
	Paul Varelans	def.	Dick Vrij	KO (Punch)	2	0:30
	Gilbert Yvel	def.	Bob Schrijber	Submission (Achilles Lock)	2	1:12
	Joop Kasteel	def.	Ameran Bitsadze	Submission (Arm Triangle Choke)	1	2:15
	Tsuyoshi Kosaka	def.	Rob van Esdonk	Submission (Heel Hook)	2	0:57
	Willie Peeters	def.	Wataru Sakata	Decision (Unanimous)	2	5:00
	Sander Thonhauser	def.	Cees Bezems	Submission (Scarf Hold Armlock)	1	0:58
	Maurice Kistenmaker	def.	John Verstegen	Decision (Unanimous)	2	5:00
	Sander MacKilljan	def.	Pedro Palm	KO (Knee)	1	2:13
	Piet van Gammeren	def.	Jerry Kalia	TKO (Knee Injury)	2	0:19
	Valentijn Overeem	def.	Chris Haseman	Decision (Unanimous)	2	5:00
	Dave van der Veen	def.	Johan Buur	Submission (Rear Naked Choke)	1	1:54

== Rings Russia: Russia vs. Holland ==
Rings Russia: Russia vs. Holland was an event held on April 25, 1998, in Yekaterinburg, Russia.

=== Results ===
Main Card
Weight class				Method	Round	Time	Notes
	Bob Schrijber	def.	Iouri Bekichev	TKO	1	3:01

== Rings: Third Fighting Integration ==
Rings: Third Fighting Integration was an event held on May 29, 1998, in Tokyo, Japan.

=== Results ===
Main Card
Weight class				Method	Round	Time	Notes
	Tariel Bitsadze	def.	Kiyoshi Tamura (c)	TKO	1	3:39	(Note: For The Fighting Network Rings Openweight Championship.)
	Tsuyoshi Kosaka	def.	Magomedkhan Gamzatkhanov	Submission	1	10:10
	Mikhail Ilyukhin	def.	Masayuki Naruse	Submission	1	13:52
	Zaza Tkeshelashvili	def.	Joop Kasteel	Submission	1	5:54
	Kenichi Yamamoto	def.	Chris Haseman	Submission	1	12:39
	Hiromitsu Kanehara	def.	Lee Hasdell	TKO	1	30:00

== Rings Holland: Who's the Boss ==
Rings Holland: Who's the Boss was an event held on June 7, 1998, at Vechtsebanen Sport Hall in Utrecht, Netherlands.

=== Results ===
Main Card
Weight class				Method	Round	Time	Notes
	Gilbert Yvel	def.	Valentijn Overeem	TKO (Shoulder Injury)	1	0:38
	George Torchinava	def.	Joe Akano	Submission (Ankle Injury)	1	0:25
	Joop Kasteel	def.	Herman van Tol	KO (Kick to the Body)	2	0:58
	Lee Hasdell	def.	Dave van der Veen	KO (Palm Strike)	2	4:48
	Wouter Bakker	def.	Jonny van Wanrooy	Submission (Keylock)	1	0:34
	Hans Nijman	def.	Victor Kruger	KO (Head Kick)	2	0:10
	Jeffrey van 't Schip	def.	Andrew Keja	Submission (Guillotine Choke)	1	1:28
	Hans Frugte	def.	Harry de Bruin	DQ	1	0:00
	Mario Borzic	def.	Fred van Doesburg	Decision (Unanimous)	2	5:00
	Mustafa Azoufri	def.	Rinie van Brakel	Submission (Heel Hook)	2	0:12

== Rings: Fourth Fighting Integration ==
Rings: Fourth Fighting Integration was an event held on June 27, 1998, in Tokyo, Japan.

=== Results ===
Main Card
Weight class				Method	Round	Time	Notes
	Tsuyoshi Kosaka	vs.	Kiyoshi Tamura	Draw	1	30:00
	Masayuki Naruse	def.	Kenichi Yamamoto	Submission	1	11:07
	Hans Nijman	def.	Vladimir Klementiev	Submission	1	4:44
	Hiromitsu Kanehara	def.	Sander MacKilljan	Decision	1	3:26
	Wataru Sakata	def.	Willie Peeters	Submission	1	1:45
	Yasuhito Namekawa	def.	Troy Ittensohn	TKO	2	1:43

== Rings Australia: NR2 ==
Rings Australia: NR2 was an event held on September 13, 1998, in Australia.

=== Results ===
Main Card
Weight class				Method	Round	Time	Notes
	Al Reynish	def.	Elvis Sinosic	TKO (Retirement)	1	7:52

== Rings Holland: The Thialf Explosion ==
Rings Holland: The Thialf Explosion was an event held on October 24, 1998, at Thialf Stadion in Heerenveen in Friesland, the Netherlands.

=== Results ===
Main Card
Weight class				Method	Round	Time	Notes
	Gilbert Yvel	def.	Lee Hasdell	TKO (Cut)	0	0:00
	Sander MacKilljan	def.	Rick Holshuizen	KO	0	0:00
	Ricardo Fyeet	def.	Andrew Keja	KO	0	0:00
	Alfred Neef	def.	Sikko Postema	DQ	0	0:00
	Hans Frugte	def.	Gerard Benschop	Submission	0	0:00
	Brian Lo-A-Njoe	vs.	Stephan Tapilatu	Draw	0	0:00
	Sander Thonhauser	def.	Scott Goddard	Decision (Split)	2	5:00
	Rick Rootlieb	def.	Johan Woudstra	KO	0	0:00
	Wouter Bakker	def.	Peter Steet	Submission (Armbar)	0	0:00
	Dave van der Veen	def.	Piet van Gammeren	TKO (Cut)	0	0:00

== Rings: World Mega Battle Tournament ==
Rings: World Mega Battle Tournament was an event held on December 23, 1998, in Japan.

=== Results ===
Main Card
Weight class				Method	Round	Time	Notes
	Kiyoshi Tamura	def.	Kenichi Yamamoto	TKO	2	1:26
	Joop Kasteel	def.	Masayuki Naruse	TKO	1	8:33
	Hiromitsu Kanehara	def.	Hans Nijman	Submission (Arm Bar)	1	9:04
	Wataru Sakata	def.	Dick Vrij	TKO	1	2:29

== See also ==
- Fighting Network Rings
- List of Fighting Network Rings events
