= Jeffrey Heijm =

Dutch mixed martial artist

- Born: Netherlands
- Nationality: Dutch
- Team: Chakuriki
- Years active: 1995 - 2003

Mixed martial arts record
- Total: 9
- Wins: 3
- By knockout: 1
- By submission: 1
- By decision: 1
- Losses: 4
- By decision: 4
- Draws: 2

Other information
- Mixed martial arts record from Sherdog

Jeffrey Heijm is a Dutch mixed martial artist.

== Mixed martial arts record ==
Professional record breakdown
9 matches	3 wins	4 losses
By knockout	1	0
By submission	1	0
By decision	1	4
Draws	2	

Res.	Record	Opponent	Method	Event	Date	Round	Time	Location	Notes
Loss	3-4-2	Metin Yakut	Decision (1-0 points)	KD 2: Killer Dome 2	February 2, 2003	2	3:00	Amsterdam, Netherlands	
Loss	3-3-2	Furdjel de Windt	Decision (1-0 points)	KD 1: Killer Dome 1	December 15, 2002	0	0:00	Amsterdam, Netherlands	
Loss	3-2-2	Stephan Tapilatu	Decision (unanimous)	Rings Holland: Di Capo Di Tutti Capi	June 4, 2000	2	5:00	Utrecht, Netherlands	
Loss	3-1-2	Brian Lo-A-Njoe	Decision (unanimous)	Rings Holland: There Can Only Be One Champion	February 6, 2000	2	5:00	Utrecht, Netherlands	
Win	3-0-2	Rogier van Eck	Submission (armbar)	Rings Holland: The Kings of the Magic Ring	June 20, 1999	2	2:57	Utrecht, Netherlands	
Win	2-0-2	Biolcati Biolcati	KO (knee)	WD: Warriors Day	February 28, 1999	0	0:00	Pavia, Italy	
Draw	1-0-2	Youssef Akhnikh	Draw	Rings Holland: Judgement Day	February 7, 1999	3	3:00	Amsterdam, North Holland, Netherlands	
Win	1-0-1	Ron Post	Decision	Together Productions: Fight Gala	October 3, 1998	0	0:00	Huizen, Netherlands	
Draw	0-0-1	Ron Post	Draw	BOA: Battle of Amstelveen	December 2, 1995	2	5:00	Amstelveen, North Holland, Netherlands	

== See also ==
- List of male mixed martial artists
