= 1999 in Fighting Network Rings =

Mixed martial arts events

Information
- First date: February 7, 1999
- Last date: December 22, 1999

Events
- Total events: 12

Fights
- Total fights: 97
- Title fights: 1

Chronology
1998 in RINGS	1999 in Fighting Network Rings	2000 in RINGS

The year 1999 is the fifth year in the history of Fighting Network Rings, a mixed martial arts promotion based in Japan. In 1999 Fighting Network Rings held 12 events beginning with, Rings Holland: Judgement Day.

== Title fights ==
Title fights in 1999
Weight class				Method	Round	Time	Event	Notes
Openweight	Kiyoshi Tamura	def.	Tariel Bitsadze (c)	Submission (Rear-Naked Choke)	1	9:19	Rings: Rise 3rd	(Note: For The Fighting Network Rings Openweight Championship.)

== Events list ==
#	Event title	Date	Arena	Location
37	Rings: King of Kings 1999 Block B	December 22, 1999	Osaka Prefectural Gymnasium	Osaka, Japan
36	Rings: King of Kings 1999 Block A	October 28, 1999	Yoyogi National Stadium Gym 2	Tokyo, Japan
35	Rings: Rings Georgia	October 8, 1999		Georgia
34	Rings: Rise 5th	August 19, 1999		Japan
33	Rings: Rise 4th	June 24, 1999		Japan
32	Rings Holland: The Kings of the Magic Ring	June 20, 1999	Vechtsebanen Sport Hall	Utrecht, Netherlands
31	Rings: Rise 3rd	May 22, 1999		Japan
30	Rings: Rise 2nd	April 23, 1999		Japan
29	Rings: Rise 1st	March 20, 1999		Japan
28	Rings Australia: NR 3	March 7, 1999	Alexandra Hills Hotel	Australia
27	Rings: Final Capture	February 21, 1999		Japan
26	Rings Holland: Judgement Day	February 7, 1999	Sport Hall Zuid	Amsterdam, North Holland, Netherlands

== Rings Holland: Judgement Day ==
Rings Holland: Judgement Day was an event held on February 7, 1999, at The Sport Hall Zuid in Amsterdam, North Holland, Netherlands.

=== Results ===
Main Card
Weight class				Method	Round	Time	Notes
	Dick Vrij	def.	Zane Frazier	KO (Punch)	1	2:34
	Gilbert Yvel	def.	Big Mo T	KO (Flying Knee)	1	1:59
	Joop Kasteel	def.	Henk Kuipers	KO (Palm Strikes)	1	0:52
	Ricardo Fyeet	def.	Tjerk Vermanen	TKO (Elbow Injury)	1	1:10
	Richard Plug	def.	Gerard van Wijk	Submission (Scarf Hold Armlock)	2	1:01
	Jerrel Venetiaan	def.	Dave van der Veen	TKO (Punches)	2	2:40
	Sander Thonhauser	def.	Joe Akano	TKO (Punches)	2	0:00
	Brian Lo-A-Njoe	vs.	Alfred Neef	Draw	3	3:00
	Rick Rootlieb	def.	Adrian Wild	Submission (Kneebar)	1	1:55
	Jeffrey Heijm	vs.	Youssef Akhnikh	Draw	3	3:00

== Rings: Final Capture ==
Rings: Final Capture was an event held on February 21, 1999, in Japan.

=== Results ===
Main Card
Weight class				Method	Round	Time	Notes
	Alexander Karelin	def.	Akira Maeda	Decision (Unanimous)	3	5:00
	Kiyoshi Tamura	def.	Valentijn Overeem	Submission (Arm Bar)	1	6:08
	Ricardo Morais	def.	Hiromitsu Kanehara	Decision	5	5:00
	Sean Alvarez	def.	Wataru Sakata	Decision	3	5:00
	Magomedkhan Gamzatkhanov	def.	Nikolai Zouev	Submission	1	4:49
	Yoshihisa Yamamoto	def.	Andrei Kopylov	Submission	1	6:55
	Yasuhito Namekawa	def.	Ryuki Ueyama	Decision	3	5:00

== Rings Australia: NR 3 ==
Rings Australia: NR 3 was an event held on March 7, 1999, at The Alexandra Hills Hotel in Australia.

=== Results ===
Main Card
Weight class				Method	Round	Time	Notes
	Chris Haseman	def.	Dick Vrij	Submission (Rear Naked Choke)	1	5:17
	Mick Cutajar	def.	Al Reynish	KO	1	4:02
	Ryuki Ueyama	def.	Dennis Kefalinos	Submission (Knee Bar)	1	4:40
	Tim Thomas	vs.	Brad Aird	Draw	1	10:00
	Maynard Marcum	def.	Kevin Carey	Decision	1	10:00
	Hans Nijman	def.	Danny Higgins	Submission (Rear Naked Choke)	1	5:46
	D Man	vs.	Cam Herbert	Draw	1	10:00
	Joe Perry	vs.	Stuart Ashby	Draw	1	10:00
	Corey Lang	def.	Kevin Thompson	Decision	1	10:00
	Barney Cook	def.	Shaun Price	TKO	1	7:11

== Rings: Rise 1st ==
Rings: Rise 1st was an event held on March 20, 1999, in Japan.

=== Results ===
Main Card
Weight class				Method	Round	Time	Notes
	Kiyoshi Tamura	def.	Hiromitsu Kanehara	Submission (Armbar)	3	0:14
	Mikhail Ilyukhin	def.	Randy Couture	Submission (Kimura)	1	7:43
	Yoshihisa Yamamoto	def.	Valentijn Overeem	Submission (Armbar)	1	2:40
	Masayuki Naruse	def.	Dave van der Veen	Submission (Achilles Lock)	1	7:36
	Borislav Jeliazkov	def.	Wataru Sakata	Submission (Scarf Hold)	1	8:28
	Chris Haseman	def.	Yasuhito Namekawa	Submission (Arm-Triangle Choke)	1	7:42

== Rings: Rise 2nd ==
Rings: Rise 2nd was an event held on April 23, 1999, in Japan.

=== Results ===
Main Card
Weight class				Method	Round	Time	Notes
	Frank Shamrock	vs.	Kiyoshi Tamura	Draw	1	20:00
	Gilbert Yvel	def.	Tsuyoshi Kosaka	TKO (Doctor Stoppage)	1	14:58
	Yoshihisa Yamamoto	def.	Joop Kasteel	TKO (Palm Strikes)	1	7:32
	Chris Haseman	def.	Masayuki Naruse	Submission (Kimura)	1	8:18
	Zaza Tkeshelashvili	def.	Sander Thonhauser	TKO (5 Lost Points)	1	4:02
	Lee Hasdell	def.	Ryuki Ueyama	DQ (Eye Gouging)	1	4:18

== Rings: Rise 3rd ==
Rings: Rise 3rd was an event held on May 22, 1999, in Japan.

=== Results ===
Main Card
Weight class				Method	Round	Time	Notes
Openweight	Kiyoshi Tamura	def.	Tariel Bitsadze (c)	Submission (Rear-Naked Choke)	1	9:19	(Note: For The Fighting Network Rings Openweight Championship.)
	Yoshihisa Yamamoto	def.	Tsuyoshi Kosaka	TKO (Palm Strikes)	3	0:41
	Mikhail Ilyukhin	def.	Joop Kasteel	Submission (Achilles Lock)	1	9:40
	Magomedkhan Gamzatkhanov	def.	Masayuki Naruse	Submission (Armbar)	1	4:26
	Valentijn Overeem	def.	Hiromitsu Kanehara	TKO (Corner Stoppage)	1	4:35
	Yasuhito Namekawa	def.	Sara Umer	Submission (Rear-Naked Choke)	1	3:09

== Rings Holland: The Kings of the Magic Ring ==
Rings Holland: The Kings of the Magic Ring was an event held on June 20, 1999, at The Vechtsebanen Sport Hall in Utrecht, Netherlands.

=== Results ===
Main Card
Weight class				Method	Round	Time	Notes
	Gilbert Yvel	def.	Semmy Schilt	KO (Punches)	2	4:45
	Rodney Glunder	vs.	Melvin Manhoef	Draw	2	5:00
	Big Mo T	def.	Sander MacKilljan	KO (Punch)	1	1:39
	Ricardo Fyeet	NC.	Jerrel Venetiaan	No Contest	1	1:08
	Piet van Gammeren	def.	Peter Verschuren	Decision (Unanimous)	3	3:00
	Dave Scott	def.	Gerard van Wijk	KO (Punch)	1	2:01
	Renaldo Rijkhoff	def.	Rick Holshuizen	KO (Punch)	2	1:12
	Richard Plug	def.	Rick Rootlieb	Submission (Smother)	2	2:22
	Jeffrey Heijm	def.	Rogier van Eck	Submission (Armbar)	2	2:57
	Arie Maigret	def.	Marcus Hapi	KO (Punch)	2	0:54

== Rings: Rise 4th ==
Rings: Rise 4th was an event held on June 24, 1999, in Japan.

=== Results ===
Main Card
Weight class				Method	Round	Time	Notes
	Kiyoshi Tamura	vs.	Yoshihisa Yamamoto	Draw	3	5:00
	Joop Kasteel	def.	Tariel Bitsadze	Submission (Keylock)	1	6:01
	Zaza Tkeshelashvili	def.	Magomedkhan Gamzatkhanov	Decision (Unanimous)	3	10:00
	Hiromitsu Kanehara	def.	Masayuki Naruse	Decision (Unanimous)	3	10:00
	Wataru Sakata	def.	Borislav Jeliazkov	Submission (Armbar)	1	6:49
	Yasuhito Namekawa	def.	Minoru Toyonaga	Submission (Guillotine Choke)	1	9:51
	Ryuki Ueyama	def.	Willie Peeters	TKO (Lost Points)	3	3:05

== Rings: Rise 5th ==
Rings: Rise 5th was an event held on August 19, 1999, in Japan.

=== Results ===
Main Card
Weight class				Method	Round	Time	Notes
	Kiyoshi Tamura	def.	Joop Kasteel	Submission (Armbar)	2	2:17
	Tsuyoshi Kosaka	def.	Gilbert Yvel	Technical Decision (Lost Points)	1	8:17
	Hiromitsu Kanehara	def.	Wataru Sakata	Decision (Lost Points)	3	5:00
	Lee Hasdell	def.	Ricardo Fyeet	Submission (Toe Hold)	2	5:01
	Chris Haseman	def.	Willie Peeters	Submission (Kneebar)	1	3:13
	Ryuki Ueyama	def.	Yasuhito Namekawa	Decision (Lost Points)	3	5:00

== Rings: Rings Georgia ==
Rings: Rings Georgia was an event held on October 8, 1999, in Georgia.

=== Results ===
Main Card
Weight class				Method	Round	Time	Notes
	Bakouri Gogitidze	def.	Mikhail Ilyukhin	Submission (Rear Naked Choke)	1	5:07
	Tskhadaze Zaouri	def.	Dimitre Petkov	KO	1	3:21
	Zaza Tkeshelashvili	def.	Magomedkhan Gamzatkhanov	KO	1	7:08
	Tariel Bitsadze	def.	Joop Kasteel	TKO	1	4:11
	Koba Tkeshelashvili	def.	Yasuhito Namekawa	Submission (Rear Naked Choke)	1	6:15

== Rings: King of Kings 1999 Block A ==
Rings: King of Kings 1999 Block A was an event held on October 28, 1999, at The Yoyogi National Stadium Gym 2 in Tokyo, Japan.

=== Results ===
King of Kings 1999 Block A Round of 16
Weight class				Method	Round	Time	Notes
	Mikhail Ilyukhin	def.	Brad Kohler	Submission (armbar)	1	2:16
	Dan Henderson	def.	Hiromitsu Kanehara	Decision (majority)	2	5:00
	Antônio Rodrigo Nogueira	def.	Yuriy Kochkine	Technical Submission (armbar)	1	0:40
	Renato Sobral	def.	Lee Hasdell	Decision (unanimous)	2	5:00
King of Kings 1999 Block A Round of 32
	Brad Kohler	def.	Yoshihisa Yamamoto	Submission (smother)	1	1:57
	Mikhail Ilyukhin	def.	Justin McCully	Technical Submission (achilles lock)	1	4:48
	Dan Henderson	def.	Bakouri Gogitidze	Submission (knee to the ribs)	1	2:17
	Hiromitsu Kanehara	def.	Jeremy Horn	Decision (majority)	2	5:00
	Antônio Rodrigo Nogueira	def.	Valentijn Overeem	Technical Submission (keylock)	1	1:51
	Yuriy Kochkine	def.	Alistair Overeem	Decision (majority)	2	5:00
	Renato Sobral	def.	Zaza Tkeshelashvili	Submission (kimura)	2	1:11
	Lee Hasdell	def.	Achmed Labasanov	TKO (kick)	2	3:33

== Rings: King of Kings 1999 Block B ==
Rings: King of Kings 1999 Block B was an event held on December 22, 1999, at The Osaka Prefectural Gymnasium in Osaka, Japan.

=== Results ===
King of Kings 1999 Block B Round of 16
Weight class				Method	Round	Time	Notes
	Kiyoshi Tamura	def.	Borislav Jeliazkov	Submission (rear-naked choke)	2	1:17
	Gilbert Yvel	def.	Tsuyoshi Kosaka	TKO (cut)	1	1:17
	Renzo Gracie	def.	Maurice Smith	Submission (armlock)	1	0:50
	Andrei Kopylov	def.	Ricardo Fyeet	Submission (achilles lock)	1	0:08
King of Kings 1999 Block B Round of 32
	Kiyoshi Tamura	def.	Dave Menne	Decision (unanimous)	2	5:00
	Borislav Jeliazkov	def.	Tim Lajcik	Submission (rear-naked choke)	1	2:23
	Tsuyoshi Kosaka	def.	Chris Haseman	Decision (split)	3	5:00	(Note: Declared a draw after two rounds.)
	Gilbert Yvel	def.	Tariel Bitsadze	Submission (armbar)	1	2:18
	Renzo Gracie	def.	Wataru Sakata	Submission (armbar)	1	1:25
	Maurice Smith	def.	Branden Lee Hinkle	Decision (majority)	2	5:00
	Ricardo Fyeet	def.	Tyrone Roberts	KO (kick)	2	0:09
	Andrei Kopylov	def.	Leonardo Castello Branco	Submission (kneebar)	1	0:16

== See also ==
- Fighting Network Rings
- List of Fighting Network Rings events
