= Pedro Palm =

Dutch mixed martial arts fighter

- Born: Netherlands
- Nationality: Dutch
- Division: Heavyweight
- Years active: 1995 - 1999

Mixed martial arts record
- Total: 8
- Wins: 2
- By submission: 2
- Losses: 5
- By knockout: 4
- By submission: 1
- No contests: 1

Other information
- Mixed martial arts record from Sherdog

Pedro Palm is a Dutch mixed martial artist. He competed in the Heavyweight division.

== Mixed martial arts record ==
Professional record breakdown
8 matches	2 wins	5 losses
By knockout	0	4
By submission	2	1
No contests	1	

Res.	Record	Opponent	Method	Event	Date	Round	Time	Location	Notes
Loss	2-5 (1)	Can Sahinbas	TKO	IMA: Mix Fight Gala	January 31, 1999	0	0:00	Landsmeer, North Holland, Netherlands	
Loss	2-4 (1)	Sander MacKilljan	KO (knee)	Rings Holland: The King of Rings	February 8, 1998	1	2:13	North Holland, Netherlands	
Loss	2-3 (1)	Oleg Tsygolnik	Submission (rear naked choke)	M-1 MFC: World Championship 1997	November 1, 1997	1	0:57	St. Petersburg, Russia	
Loss	2-2 (1)	Gilbert Yvel	TKO	Gym Alkmaar: Fight Gala	October 5, 1997	0	0:00	Netherlands	
Loss	2-1 (1)	Joop Kasteel	KO (palm strikes)	Rings Holland: Utrecht at War	June 29, 1997	1	4:17	Utrecht, Netherlands	
NC	2-0 (1)	Dick Vrij	No Contest	Rings Holland: The Final Challenge	February 2, 1997	1	1:00	Amsterdam, North Holland, Netherlands	
Win	2-0	Michael Tielrooy	Submission (leglock)	IMA: Battle of Styles	October 26, 1996	0	0:00	Netherlands	
Win	1-0	Richard Anderson	Submission (guillotine choke)	BOA: Battle of Amstelveen	December 2, 1995	1	0:56	Amstelveen, North Holland, Netherlands	

== See also ==
- List of male mixed martial artists
