= Aaron Brink =

American mixed martial artist (1974–2023)

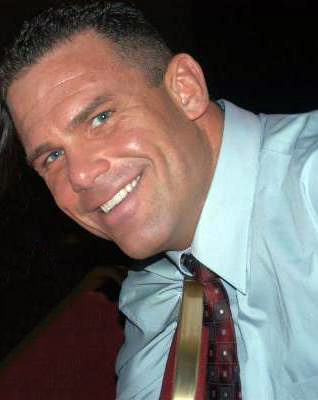
- Brink in 2005
- Born: Aaron Franklin Brink; November 12, 1974; Newport Beach, California, U.S.
- Died: May 26, 2023 (aged 48); El Cajon, California, U.S.
- Other names: Dick Delaware; The Frijolero
- Height: 6 ft 3 in (1.91 m)
- Weight: 231 lb (105 kg; 16.5 st)
- Division: Heavyweight; Light Heavyweight
- Reach: 75 in (191 cm)
- Stance: Orthodox
- Fighting out of: San Diego, California
- Team: The Compound; The Arena; Team Carnage
- Years active: 1998–2019

Mixed martial arts record
- Total: 58
- Wins: 29
- By knockout: 25
- By submission: 4
- Losses: 27
- By knockout: 11
- By submission: 15
- By decision: 1
- No contests: 2

Other information
- Spouse: Laura Voepel (m. 1999; div. 2001)
- Children: 2, including Anderson Lee Aldrich
- Mixed martial arts record from Sherdog

Aaron Franklin Brink (November 12, 1974 – May 26, 2023), also known by his stage name Dick Delaware, was an American professional mixed martial artist and pornographic film actor who competed in the Light Heavyweight division. He competed for King of the Cage, RINGS, UFC and World Extreme Cagefighting. Out of 57 career bouts, only one went to decision.

Brink has appeared in episodes of Intervention and Divorce Court and portrayed Electro in Spider-Man XXX: A Porn Parody (2011).

He was the father of Anderson Lee Aldrich, who murdered 5 people and injured 19 others in the Club Q shooting in Colorado Springs, Colorado in November 2022.

== Early life ==
Aaron Brink was born on November 12, 1974, in Newport Beach, California. Raised by his blue-collar father in Huntington Beach, he developed passions for wrestling and surfing. Brink attended Huntington High before being expelled for fighting. From 1989 to 1992, he was in and out of juvenile detention centers on eight occasions.

Brink was arrested and sentenced to serve time for smuggling marijuana from Mexico into the United States. While at the Federal Correctional Institution, Terminal Island, Brink spent his days training to fight on a heavy bag. He was released at age 24.

== Career ==
After being released from prison, Brink connected with an old friend who encouraged him to enter mixed martial arts. He made his debut at the West Coast NHB Championships in December 1998, winning three fights via knockout. By 2003, he had fought 24 times, compiling a record of 15–8 (1). He competed for the Gladiator Challenge promotion, where he was Interim Heavyweight Champion and the Bare Knuckle Fighting Championship.

Brink entered the adult film industry under the name "Dick Delaware" after being encouraged by a producer at a party. He shot his first scene in 2002.

Brink's adult film career was first revealed after he appeared in an episode of the television series Intervention discussing his addiction to methamphetamine. Brink later returned to the adult industry.

== Personal life and death ==
Brink married Laura Voepel, the daughter of California politician Randy Voepel, in 1999, and divorced her in 2001. Brink struggled with a long-term addiction to methamphetamine.

Brink is the father of Anderson Lee Aldrich, who was convicted of committing the Club Q shooting on November 19–20, 2022, and sentenced to life in prison. Brink said that he had "praised [Aldrich] for violent behavior really early", teaching him his belief that such behavior worked and produced immediate results. Aldrich later sought to dissociate from his father after moving to Colorado, changing his name to "protect [him]self" from Brink.

In an interview after the shooting, Brink said that he was a "conservative Republican" and a Mormon, and that when he learned the shooting was at an LGBTQ bar, he was initially horrified by the possibility that Aldrich might be gay, then relieved to discover that was not the case. The reporter who interviewed Brink later mentioned that his reaction was not included in the original report, but when Brink learned about the victims, he profusely apologized to the community.

On May 21, 2016, Brink and another man were arrested in Rocklin, California, for attempted burglary and possession of a firearm. Brink was also charged for violation of parole and being under the influence of a controlled substance.

Brink died on May 26, 2023, of pancreatic cancer. He was 48.

== Select appearances ==
Title	Year	Notes	Ref.
Cum Drippers 4	2003	Adult film debut	
Intervention	2009	Episode: "Aaron & Andrea"	
Spider-Man XXX: A Porn Parody	2011	Role: Electro	
Divorce Court	2011	Episode: "Aaron vs. Vanessa Brink"	

== Mixed martial arts record ==
Professional record breakdown
58 matches	29 wins	27 losses
By knockout	25	11
By submission	4	15
By decision	0	1
No contests	2	

Res.	Record	Opponent	Method	Event	Date	Round	Time	Location	Notes
Win	29–27 (2)	Cody Sons	TKO (punches)	California Cage Wars 13	June 9, 2019	1	1:35	Valley Center, California, United States	
Win	28–27 (2)	William Johnson	Submission (rear-naked choke)	Gladiator Challenge: Redemption	March 31, 2018	1	0:47	Lincoln, California, United States	Non-title bout.
Win	27–27 (2)	Jon Rizo	Submission (boston crab)	California Cage Wars 4	March 4, 2018	1	1:37	Valley Center, California, United States	
NC	26–27 (2)	Dave Huckaba	No Contest	Gladiator Challenge: Warpath	October 15, 2016	1	N/A	Lincoln, California, United States	Won the Gladiator Challenge Heavyweight Championship.
Loss	26–27 (1)	Sean Loeffler	KO (punch)	Gladiator Challenge: MMA Smackdown	April 2, 2016	1	0:04	El Cajon, California, United States	
Loss	26–26 (1)	Ashley Gooch	TKO (submission to punches)	Duel for Domination 8	June 14, 2014	1	0:29	Mesa, Arizona, United States	Return to Heavyweight.
Loss	26–25 (1)	Dan Huber	Submission (verbal)	Rage In The Cage 170	February 1, 2014	1	0:52	Phoenix, Arizona, United States	
Win	26–24 (1)	Adrian Perez	TKO (punches)	Gladiator Challenge: Summer Heat	June 30, 2013	1	0:23	San Jacinto, California, United States	
Loss	25–24 (1)	Joe Riggs	Submission (armbar)	Rage in the Cage 159	May 11, 2012	2	1:18	Chandler, Arizona, United States	
Loss	25–23 (1)	Julian Hamilton	Submission (rear-naked choke)	Rage in the Cage 158	April 13, 2012	2	2:15	Chandler, Arizona, United States	
Win	25–22 (1)	Jesse Varela	Submission (rear-naked choke)	TCF: Rumble at the Ranch 1	April 23, 2011	1	2:04	Phoenix, Arizona, United States	
Loss	24–22 (1)	Shawn Frye	Submission (rear-naked choke)	Rage in the Cage 151	April 16, 2011	1	2:01	Chandler, Arizona, United States	
Win	24–21 (1)	Larry Robertson	TKO (submission to punches)	Rage in the Cage 150	March 19, 2011	1	0:55	Chandler, Arizona, United States	
Loss	23–21 (1)	Brad Peterson	Submission (armbar)	Rage in the Cage 149	February 19, 2011	1	2:50	Chandler, Arizona, United States	
Loss	23–20 (1)	Vitor Vianna	TKO (punches)	Millennium Events: MMA Xplosion	October 9, 2010	1	1:17	Las Vegas, Nevada, United States	Return to Light Heavyweight.
Win	23–19 (1)	Dan Quinn	TKO (doctor stoppage)	Gladiator Challenge: Fahrenheit	August 20, 2010	2	0:22	San Jacinto, California, United States	
Loss	22–19 (1)	Travis Browne	KO (punches)	Gladiator Challenge: Vision Quest	February 21, 2010	1	0:35	San Jacinto, California, United States	For the vacant Gladiator Challenge Heavyweight Championship.
Win	22–18 (1)	Lloyd Marshbanks	TKO (corner stoppage)	MMA Xtreme 9	March 3, 2007	2	N/A	Tijuana, Mexico	
Loss	21–18 (1)	Sherman Pendergarst	Submission (rear-naked choke)	PF 2: Live MMA	August 18, 2006	1	0:54	Hollywood, California, United States	
Win	21–17 (1)	Adam Nance	KO (punches)	LA EFN: Executive Fight Night	July 29, 2006	1	N/A	N/A	
Loss	20–17 (1)	Eli Joslin	Submission (guillotine choke)	KOTC: Heavy Hitters	April 2, 2006	1	1:52	Coarsegold, California, United States	
Loss	20–16 (1)	Buckley Acosta	KO (punch)	KOTC 63: Final Conflict	December 2, 2005	1	0:10	San Jacinto, California, United States	
Loss	20–15 (1)	Robert Beraun	KO (punches)	RITC 76: Hello Tucson	November 11, 2005	2	2:04	Arizona, United States	Return to Heavyweight.
Loss	20–14 (1)	Richard Montoya	Submission (guillotine choke)	KOTC: Execution Day	October 29, 2005	1	1:55	Reno, Nevada, United States	Light Heavyweight debut.
Loss	20–13 (1)	Fabiano Scherner	Submission (guillotine choke)	IFC: Rock N' Rumble	July 30, 2005	1	0:50	Reno, Nevada, United States	
Win	20–12 (1)	John Meirzwa	TKO (injury)	Universal Above Ground Fighting	July 28, 2005	1	N/A	California, United States	
Loss	19–12 (1)	Mike Whitehead	Decision (unanimous)	UAGF: Clover Combat	March 25, 2005	3	5:00	California, United States	
Win	19–11 (1)	Jeff Ford	TKO (submission to punches and elbows)	Venom: First Strike	September 18, 2004	1	1:47	Huntington Beach, California, United States	
Win	18–11 (1)	Cory Timmerman	TKO (submission to punches)	RITC 60: 'The Saint' Goes Marching In	March 20, 2004	1	1:05	Phoenix, Arizona, United States	
Win	17–11 (1)	Melville Calabaca	Submission (rear-naked choke)	ECS: Evolution	July 19, 2003	1	0:33	Phoenix, Arizona, United States	
Loss	16–11 (1)	Wade Shipp	TKO (submission to strikes)	Hitman Fighting Productions 3	May 2, 2003	N/A	N/A	Santa Ana, California, United States	
Loss	16–10 (1)	Andy Montana	Submission (armbar)	RITC 47: Unstoppable	April 12, 2003	2	1:40	Phoenix, Arizona, United States	
Loss	16–9 (1)	Alistair Overeem	Submission (guillotine choke)	2H2H 6: Simply the Best 6	March 16, 2003	1	0:53	Rotterdam, South Holland, Netherlands	
Win	16–8 (1)	Allan Sullivan	KO (punch)	CFM: Cage Fighting Monterrey	January 30, 2003	1	N/A	Monterrey, Mexico	
Win	15–8 (1)	Mike Bourke	TKO (punches)	HFP 2: Hitman Fighting Productions 2	November 9, 2002	1	0:27	Santa Ana, California, United States	
Loss	14–8 (1)	Jeremy Horn	Submission (rear-naked choke)	WEC 4: Rumble Under the Sun	August 31, 2002	1	0:54	Uncasville, Connecticut, United States	
Win	14–7 (1)	Valentijn Overeem	TKO (punches)	WFA 2: Level 2	July 5, 2002	1	2:24	Las Vegas, Nevada, United States	
Win	13–7 (1)	Zane Frazier	TKO (punches)	WEC 3: All or Nothing	June 7, 2002	1	1:00	Lemoore, California, United States	
Win	12–7 (1)	Curtis Crawford	TKO (punches)	HFP 1: Rumble on the Reservation	March 30, 2002	1	2:16	Anza, California, United States	
Win	11–7 (1)	Vaughan Palelei	KO (punches)	UA 1: The Genesis	January 27, 2002	1	1:33	Hammond, Indiana, United States	
Loss	10–7 (1)	Wesley Correira	TKO (punches)	Shogun 1: Shogun 1	December 15, 2001	1	1:08	Honolulu, Hawaii, United States	
Loss	10–6 (1)	Harout Terzyan	Submission (armbar)	UP 1: Ultimate Pankration 1	November 11, 2001	1	3:23	Cabazon, California, United States	
Win	10–5 (1)	Frank Blessing	KO (punches)	GC 6: Caged Beasts	September 9, 2001	1	0:50	Colusa, California, United States	
Loss	9–5 (1)	Bazigit Atajev	KO (spinning back kick)	Rings: 10th Anniversary	August 11, 2001	1	1:09	Tokyo, Japan	
Win	9–4 (1)	Dennis Taddio	TKO (punches)	IFC WC 14: Warriors Challenge 14	July 18, 2001	1	0:29	California, United States	
NC	8–4 (1)	Rich Franklin	No Contest (accidental foot injury)	IFC WC 11: Warriors Challenge 11	January 13, 2001	1	N/A	Fresno, California, United States	For the IFC USA light heavyweight championship. Originally ruled an injury TKO victory for Franklin, changed to NC because Brink's foot got caught between the mat and the cage fence.
Loss	8–4	Andrei Arlovski	Submission (armbar)	UFC 28: High Stakes	November 17, 2000	1	0:55	Atlantic City, New Jersey, United States	
Win	8–3	Brian Tolbert	TKO (punches)	IFC WC 10: Warriors Challenge 10	October 11, 2000	1	0:56	Friant, California, United States	
Win	7–3	Jason Jones	TKO (punches)	IFC WC 10: Warriors Challenge 10	October 11, 2000	1	1:55	Friant, California, United States	
Loss	6–3	Bobby Hoffman	TKO (submission to punches)	Rings USA: Rising Stars Final	September 30, 2000	1	1:34	Moline, Illinois, United States	
Win	6–2	Tommy Sauer	TKO (punches)	Rings USA: Rising Stars Final	September 30, 2000	2	4:29	Moline, Illinois, United States	
Win	5–2	Art Hughes	KO	CFF: The Cobra Classic 2000	August 26, 2000	1	0:46	Anza, California, United States	
Loss	4–2	Bobby Hoffman	Submission (neck crank)	Rings USA: Rising Stars Block A	July 15, 2000	1	3:12	Orem, Utah, United States	
Win	4–1	Harry Moskowitz	TKO (punches)	Rings USA: Rising Stars Block A	July 15, 2000	1	0:47	Orem, Utah, United States	
Loss	3–1	Gan McGee	TKO (submission to punches)	CFF: The Cobra Challenge 1999	December 11, 1999	1	3:09	Anza, California, United States	
Win	3–0	Al Harlow	KO	WCNHBC: West Coast NHB Championships 3	June 6, 1999	N/A	N/A	Los Angeles, California, United States	
Win	2–0	Al Harlow	KO (knee)	WCNHBC: West Coast NHB Championships 1	December 8, 1998	1	1:24	Los Angeles, California, United States	
Win	1–0	Ali Afra	KO (punches)	WCNHBC: West Coast NHB Championships 1	December 8, 1998	1	0:54	Los Angeles, California, United States	

== Bare knuckle record ==
Professional record breakdown
1 match	0 wins	1 loss
By knockout	0	1

Res.	Record	Opponent	Method	Event	Date	Round	Time	Location	Notes
Lose	0–1	Mike Bissett	KO (punches)	BKFC 3	October 20, 2018	1	1:21	Biloxi, Mississippi, US	

== See also ==
- List of male mixed martial artists
