= Jerrel Venetiaan =

Dutch kickboxer

- Born: March 9, 1971 (age 55); Netherlands
- Nationality: Dutch
- Height: 1.86 m (6 ft 1 in)
- Weight: 89 kg (196 lb; 14.0 st)
- Style: MMA; Kickboxing
- Team: Team Mr. Perfect, Vol Gym

Mixed martial arts record
- Total: 8
- Wins: 4
- By knockout: 2
- By decision: 2
- Losses: 3
- By knockout: 1
- By submission: 2
- No contests: 1

Other information
- Mixed martial arts record from Sherdog

Jerrel Venetiaan (born March 9, 1971) is a retired Dutch kickboxer and mixed martial artist who fought in K-1. As a MMA fighter he fought in Pride Fighting Championships.

== Championships and accomplishments ==
=== Kickboxing ===
- 2004 King Of The Ring World GP runner up
- 2003 King Of The Ring Europe GP runner up
- 2003 K-1 World Grand Prix 2003 in Basel Champion
- 2001 K-1 Holland GP 2001 in Arnhem Champion
- WKA European professional champion

== Failed drug test ==
=== K-1 World Grand Prix 2003 in Basel ===
On May 30, 2003, Venetiaan failed a drug test prior to K-1 World Grand Prix 2003 in Basel. He tested positive for elevated testosterone. The test indicated Venetiaan's testosterone level was 500 times higher before winning the tournament trophy.

== Records ==
=== Kickboxing record ===
Date	Result	Opponent	Event	Method	Round	Time
5 October 2008	Loss	(Netherlands) Hesdy Gerges	Tough Is Not Enough, Rotterdam, Netherlands	Decision (Split)	3	3:00
28 April 2007	Loss	(Australia) Peter Graham	K-1 World Grand Prix 2007 in Hawaii, USA	Decision (Unanimous)	3	3:00
9 October 2005	Loss	(Suriname) Ashwin Balrak	Bushido Europe "Rotterdam Rumble", Rotterdam, Netherlands	Decision (split)	5	3:00
7 May 2005	Loss	(Croatia) Ante Varnica	Obračun u Ringu III, Split, Croatia	Decision	3	3:00
29 May 2004	Loss	(Suriname) Lloyd van Dams	King Of The Ring World Grand Prix, Venice, Italy, final	Decision (Unanimous)	3	3:00
For King Of The Ring 2004 World Grand Prix.
29 May 2004	Win	(Hungary) Attila Karacs	King Of The Ring World Grand Prix, Venice, Italy, semi finals	Decision (Unanimous)	3	3:00
29 May 2004	Win	(Bosnia and Herzegovina) Adnan Redžović	King Of The Ring World Grand Prix, Venice, Italy, quarter finals	Decision (Unanimous)	3	3:00
27 March 2004	Loss	(Belarus) Sergei Gur	K-1 World Grand Prix 2004 in Saitama, Japan	Decision (Unanimous)	3	3:00
29 November 2003	Loss	(Hungary) Péter Varga	King Of The Ring 2003 Europe Grand Prix, Padua, Italy, final	2nd Ext.R Decision (Split)	5	3:00
For King Of The Ring 2003 Europe Grand Prix.
29 November 2003	Win	(Romania) Ionuţ Iftimoaie	King Of The Ring 2003 Europe Grand Prix, Padua, Italy, semi finals	KO (Kick)	2	
29 November 2003	Win	(Czech Republic) Robert Bycek	King Of The Ring 2003 Europe Grand Prix, Padua, Italy, quarter finals	TKO (Low kick)	2	
11 October 2003	Loss	(Netherlands) Peter Aerts	K-1 World Grand Prix 2003 Final Elimination Osaka, Japan	Decision (Unanimous)	3	3:00
Failes to qualify for K-1 World Grand Prix 2003.
30 May 2003	Win	(Switzerland) Bjorn Bregy	K-1 World Grand Prix 2003 in Basel, Switzerland, final	Decision	3	3:00
Wins K-1 World Grand Prix 2003 in Basel tournament.
30 May 2003	Win	(Albania) Xhavit Bajrami	K-1 World Grand Prix 2003 in Basel, Switzerland, semi finals	Ext.R Decision	4	3:00
30 May 2003	Win	(Croatia) Petar Majstorovic	K-1 World Grand Prix 2003 in Basel, Switzerland, quarter finals	Decision	3	3:00
4 February 2001	Win	(Sweden) Jorgen Kruth	K-1 Holland GP 2001 in Arnhem, final	TKO (Doctor Stoppage)	1	N/A
Wins K-1 Holland GP 2001 in Arnhem tournament.
4 February 2001	Win	(Netherlands) Errol Parris	K-1 Holland GP 2001 in Arnhem, semi finals	Decision (Unanimous)	3	3:00
4 February 2001	Win	(Netherlands) Remy Bonjasky	K-1 Holland GP 2001 in Arnhem, quarter finals	Decision (Split)	3	3:00
22 October 2000	Win	(Netherlands) Remy Bonjasky	It's Showtime - Exclusive, Haarlem, Netherlands	Decision (Unanimous)	5	3:00

=== Mixed martial arts record ===
Professional record breakdown
8 matches	4 wins	3 losses
By knockout	2	1
By submission	0	2
By decision	2	0
No contests	1	

Res.	Record	Opponent	Method	Event	Date	Round	Time	Location	Notes
Win	4–3 (1)	Joop Kasteel	KO (punches)	2H2H 6 - Simply the Best 6	March 16, 2003	1	6:28	Rotterdam, Netherlands	
Loss	3–3 (1)	Hirotaka Yokoi	Submission (armbar)	Pride 23	November 24, 2002	2	3:29	Tokyo, Japan	
Win	3–2 (1)	Daijiro Matsui	Decision (split)	Pride Shockwave	August 28, 2002	3	5:00	Tokyo, Japan	
Loss	2–2 (1)	Valentijn Overeem	Submission (heel hook)	It's Showtime - Christmas Edition	December 12, 2000	1	1:27	Haarlem, Netherlands	
Win	2–1 (1)	Dave van der Veen	Decision (unanimous)	Rings Holland: Di Capo Di Tutti Capi	June 4, 2000	2	5:00	Utrecht City, Netherlands	
Loss	1–1 (1)	Bob Schrijber	KO (punch)	It's Showtime - It's Showtime	October 24, 1999	1	3:42	Haarlem, Netherlands	
NC	1–0 (1)	Ricardo Fyeet	No Contest	Rings Holland: The Kings of the Magic Ring	June 20, 1999	1	1:08	Utrecht City, Netherlands	
Win	1–0	Dave van der Veen	TKO (punches)	Rings Holland: Judgement Day	February 7, 1999	2	2:40	Amsterdam, Netherlands	
