= Andrei Kopylov =

Russian sambist, professional wrestler and MMA fighter

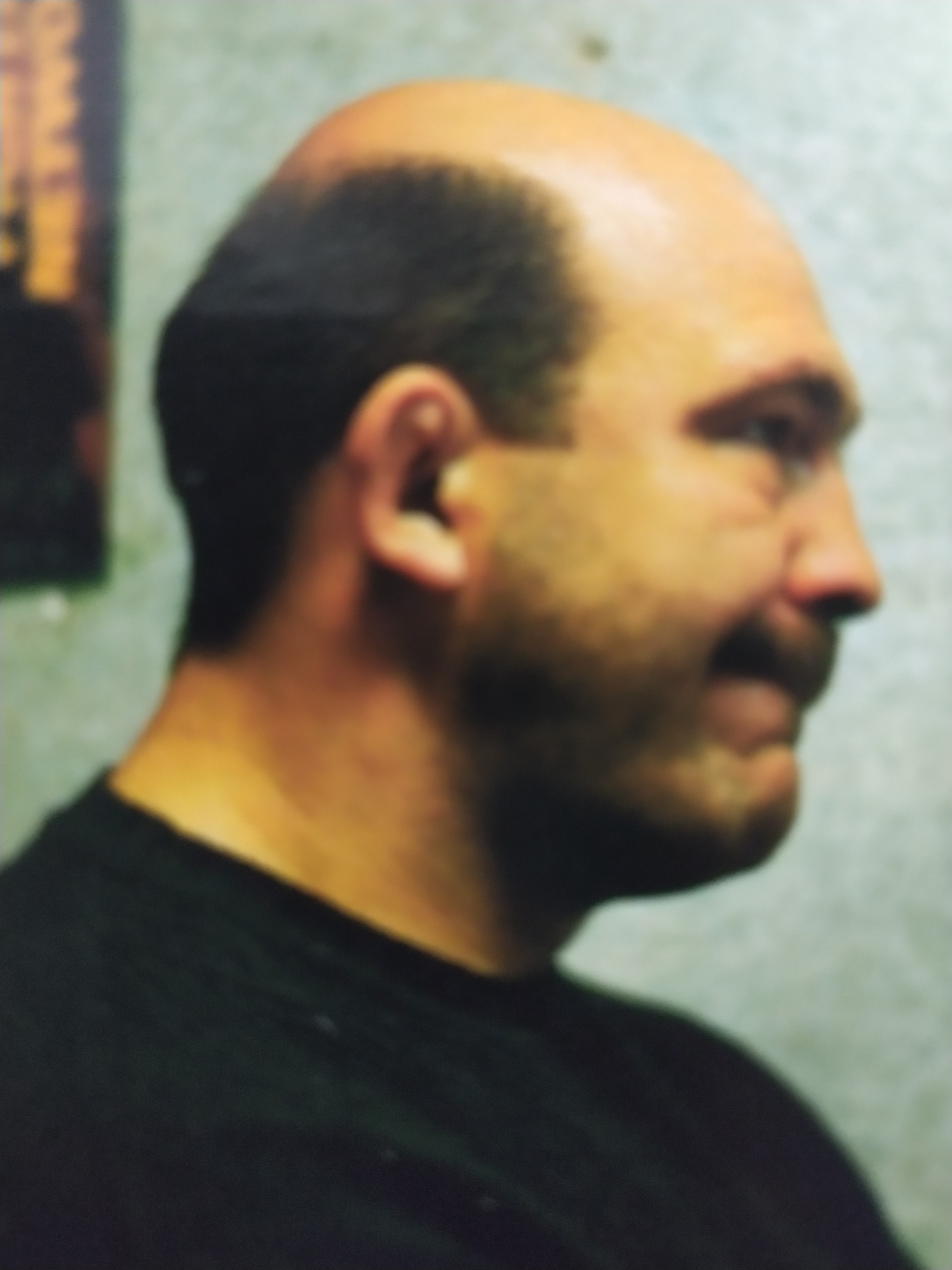
- Born: July 16, 1965 (age 61)
- Nationality: Russian
- Height: 6 ft 2 in (1.88 m)
- Weight: 262 lb (119 kg; 18.7 st)
- Division: Heavyweight
- Style: Sambo
- Team: Russian Top Team
- Years active: 1995–2010

Mixed martial arts record
- Total: 17
- Wins: 6
- By submission: 4
- By decision: 2
- Losses: 11
- By knockout: 3
- By submission: 3
- By decision: 5

Other information
- Mixed martial arts record from Sherdog

Andrei Kopylov (born July 16, 1965) is a Russian retired sambist, wrestler and mixed martial artist. He competed in the heavyweight division of Fighting Network RINGS.

== Sambo career ==
Kopylov practised various sports from the age of 17, among them basketball, volleyball and boxing, but he turned to sambo after he was introduced to his girlfriend's father, who was a sambo master. Kopylov started training with the renowned Alexander Fedorov and mastered the grappling in a short time, once even submitting his own teacher in a contest. After three months, he was sent to the national junior championships of 1983, in which he won a silver medal. He also won a bronze medal, and in 1985 he finally gained the gold. In 1986, he reached the finals of the USSR championship, being eliminated at the end by the eventual champion, Rotsyavichusom. However, Kopylov obtained revenge over him by beating him in three minutes at the national champion in 1987, ending himself in second place.

In 1991, he moved to superheavyweight division, which turned successful for him as he won the USSR championship at that weight in 1991. The same year, after failed plans to move to Canada, he was contacted by Japanese pro wrestling promotion Fighting Network RINGS, and after he accepted, he was sent to the team RINGS Russia, where he met Volk Han, his future partner in the Russian Top Team.

== Mixed martial arts career ==
=== RINGS ===
Kopylov debuted in pro wrestling in 1992, obtaining a great submission win over Volk Han. Han retaliated eliminating Kopylov from the Mega Battle Tournament 1995, in which Kopylov had taken part after submitting Grom Zaza, but he remained as an important figure in RINGS, having matches with promotion chairman Akira Maeda and his apprentice Tsuyoshi Kohsaka. Kopylov became popular among the Japanese for his anodine looks, featuring moustache, a receding hairline and an unathletic looking build, but those weren't obstacle for his grappling prowess.

After RINGS turned from pro wrestling to MMA, Kopylov struggled to keep the level due to his notorious stamina troubles and age wear, but he got renown after his performance at the King of Kings tournament in 1999. He first faced Leonardo Castello Branco, a heavy favourite to win for being a world champion in Brazilian jiu-jitsu, but Kopylov shockingly submitted him in just 19 seconds with a feint uchi mata transitioned into a kneebar. Not less surprising was his next fight at the event, outstriking Dutch kickboxer Ricardo Fyeet and submitting him in literally half of the time.

Kopylov advanced to the semifinals and was pitted against rising star Antônio Rodrigo Nogueira, another famed BJJ stylist who had previously submitted Valentijn Overeem and Kopylov's teammate Iouri Kotchkine. Kopylov started the match offensively, countering Nogueira's holds in unorthodox ways and threatening him with a persistent Kimura lock attempt for most of the first round before Nogueira reversed him and took his back. At the second round, Nogueira avoided fighting on the ground and scored punches over Kopylov, who was clearly tired and fighting without gloves (legally according to the ruleset, but ruling out his possibility to use closed-fisted striking). After a failed flying kneebar by the exhausted Russian, Nogueira decided to return to the mat with a takedown, only for Kopylov to throw him by tawara gaeshi, making them return to a stalemate. When time went out, two judges claimed draw and a third ruled it for Nogueira, so Kopylov was eliminated from the tournament.

At the next RINGS event, Kopylov met the debuting Ricardo Arona. The stronger and much younger Brazilian controlled the fight via takedowns and position, though he was unable to finish Kopylov due to the Russian's defensive acumen. In an instance, Ricardo accidentally eye-gouged Kopylov, which damaged his eye and stunted his performance for the rest of the bout. At the end, Arona was granted a unanimous decision. Notably, one of the judges (Chris Dolman) ruled his judgement of Kopylov as 10 out of 20 for his lack of cardio, which caused laughs among the audience and Kopylov himself.

Kopylov also fought Ultimate Fighting Championship veteran Dan Severn in RINGS. Kopylov landed several punches thanks to superior hand speed, but Severn used his wrestling background to take him down, which Kopylov countered by flipping him over and threatening with a triangle choke from the top. Shortly after, however, Severn landed a right hook which drew blood from the Russian, before controlling him for a unanimous decision. Kopylov's last fight in RINGS was against Tommy Sauer at the opening rounds of the King of Kings 2000. The fight was controversial, as the referee stopped the action when Kopylov seemed to have been knocked out by Sauer, but Kopylov got up instantly and claimed to be unaffected. His team protested for what they called a premature stopping and a lack of comprobation by the ring doctor, but the decision was not reverted.

=== PRIDE ===
Kopylov had his last fight in Pride Fighting Championships as part of a special bout against Brazilian Top Team leader Mario Sperry. A substantially aging Kopylov fought defensively on the mat, while Sperry took advantage of the Russian's unfamiliarity with strikes on the ground and landed knee strikes and a soccer kick to the face. Despite a comeback from Kopylov with a kneebar which Sperry dove away to avoid, the kick had caused a cut in Kopylov's mouth and the match was stopped to give the win to Sperry.

== Mixed martial arts record ==
Professional record breakdown
17 matches	6 wins	11 losses
By knockout	0	3
By submission	4	3
By decision	1	5
Unknown	1	0

Res.	Record	Opponent	Method	Event	Date	Round	Time	Location	Notes
Loss	6–11	Kenny Garner	Decision (unanimous)	M-1 SELECTION 2010 - THE AMERICAS ROUND 3	August 7, 2010	3	5:00	New Jersey, U.S.	
Win	6–10	Ed Carpenter	Submission (guillotine choke)	M-1 SELECTION 2010 - THE AMERICAS ROUND 2	June 26, 2010	1	1:09	New Jersey, U.S.	
Loss	5–10	Mario Sperry	TKO (doctor stoppage)	PRIDE 22	September 29, 2002	1	6:02	Nagoya, Japan	
Win	5–9	Egidijus Valavicius	Decision (4-0 points)	Rings Lithuania: Bushido Rings 2	May 8, 2001	2		Lithuania	
Loss	4–9	Magomedkhan Gamzatkhanov	Decision	Rings Russia: Russia vs. Bulgaria	April 6, 2001	2	5:00	Ekaterinburg, Russia	
Loss	4–8	Tommy Sauer	KO (punch)	Rings: King of Kings 2000 Block B	December 22, 2000	1	0:10	Osaka, Japan	
Loss	4–7	Dan Severn	Decision (unanimous)	Rings: Millennium Combine 3	August 23, 2000	2	5:00	Osaka, Japan	
Win	4–6	Carlos Clayton	Submission (armbar)	Rings Russia: Russia vs. The World	May 20, 2000	1	0:55	Ekaterinburg, Russia	
Loss	3–6	Ricardo Arona	Decision (unanimous)	Rings: Millennium Combine 1	April 20, 2000	2	5:00	Tokyo, Japan	
Loss	3–5	Antônio Rodrigo Nogueira	Decision (majority)	Rings: King of Kings 1999 Final	February 26, 2000	2	5:00	Tokyo, Japan	
Win	3–4	Ricardo Fyeet	Submission (achilles lock)	Rings: King of Kings 1999 Block B	December 22, 1999	2	0:08	Osaka, Japan	
Win	2–4	Leonardo Castello Branco	Submission (kneebar)	Rings: King of Kings 1999 Block B	December 22, 1999	1	0:16	Osaka, Japan	
Loss	1–4	Yoshihisa Yamamoto	Submission	Rings: Final Capture	February 21, 1999	1	6:55	Japan	
Loss	1–3	Magomedkhan Gamzatkhanov	Submission	Rings - Mega Battle Tournament 1997 Semifinal 1	October 25, 1997	1	10:52	Japan	
Loss	1–2	Akira Maeda	Submission (rear-naked choke)	Rings - Extension Fighting 7	September 26, 1997	1	8:32	Japan	
Win	1–1	Zaza Tkeshelashvili	N/A	Rings - Battle Dimensions Tournament 1995 Opening Round	October 21, 1995	N/A			
Loss	0–1	Hans Nijman	KO (knee)	Rings Holland - Free Fight	February 19, 1995	1	3:10	Netherlands	
