= Hiromitsu Kanehara =

Japanese mixed martial artist (born 1970)

Hiromitsu Kanehara 金原弘光
- Born: Kim Wang-hong; October 5, 1970 (age 56); Owariasahi, Aichi, Japan
- Other names: The Smiley Killer, RINGS Saigo no Ace ("RINGS's Last Ace"), UWF no Chisho ("UWF's Grand General")
- Nationality: Japanese
- Height: 5 ft 10 in (1.78 m)
- Weight: 185 lb (84 kg; 13 st 3 lb)
- Division: Heavyweight; Light Heavyweight; Middleweight
- Style: Catch Wrestling, Muay Thai
- Stance: Orthodox
- Team: UKR
- Years active: 1996 (Kickboxing); 1998–2002, 2004–2013 (MMA)

Mixed martial arts record
- Total: 53
- Wins: 21
- By knockout: 6
- By submission: 7
- By decision: 8
- Losses: 27
- By knockout: 6
- By submission: 4
- By decision: 17
- Draws: 5

Other information
- Mixed martial arts record from Sherdog

Hiromitsu Kanehara (Japanese: 金原弘光, Kanehara Hiromitsu; born Kim Wang-hong on October 5, 1970 in Owariasahi, Aichi) is a former Japanese mixed martial artist and professional wrestler of Korean descent. A professional MMA competitor from 1998 until 2012, he found success in Fighting Network RINGS, gaining notable victories over Valentijn Overeem, Alexandre Ferreira, former King of the Cage Light Heavyweight Champion Jeremy Horn, former RINGS Light-Heavyweight Champion Masayuki Naruse and former UFC Middleweight Champion Dave Menne.

He later competed for PRIDE Fighting Championships, DEEP, Pancrase and K-1 HERO'S to mixed success. Kanehara also once competed in professional kickboxing. Kanehara initially started his career as a professional wrestler and competed mostly in shoot style wrestling with UWF International and its successor Kingdom. He later made appearances for Pro Wrestling Zero1 and Real Japan Pro Wrestling before retiring in 2020.

== Mixed martial arts career ==
=== Fighting Network RINGS ===
Kanehara debuted in RINGS with a submission win against Sander Thonhauser and followed it with a victory on May 29, 1998, against Lee Hasdell, winning by decision. He would follow with victories over Sander MacKilljan, Hans Nijman and Hasdell again, but his winning streak broke in February 1999 against Carlson Gracie apprentice Ricardo Morais. The 60 pound heavier Morais controlled Kanehara positionally with the aid of his size, leaving the Japanese relegated to try Kimura locks from underneath and trying to escape unsuccessfully.

On May 22, Kanehara faced Valentijn Overeem from RINGS Holland. Again facing a heavier opponent, Kanehara was hit with knees and kicks to the head and downed in the initial minute, but he managed to execute a takedown on Overeem, who fell badly and dislocated his knee. Judges and referee deliberated about letting the match continue after the knee was relocated, and they eventually conceded. Returning to action, Overeem landed a body kick which Kanehara grabbed for another takedown, but Hiromitsu fell into a guillotine and was forced to spend a rope escape. The sequence repeated itself before Overeem knocked Kanehara out with a high kick.

Kanehara had his debut in worldwide MMA at the 1999 edition of the King of Kings tournament, where he faced tough opposition. Kanehara eliminated Jeremy Horn in a prolonged grappling affair in the first round, winning the unanimous decision thanks to his superior wrestling and ground work, and then went to face eventual winner Dan Henderson. The match was harsh and brutal, with Kanehara getting his nose broken and finally being dominated with repeated takedowns for a majority decision loss.

After the tournament, Kanehara avenged his defeat to Valentijn Overeem, knocking out the Dutch fighter via punch from the clinch in a much shorter match. He was next sent as a RINGS representative to the event Colosseum 2000, where he found himself in front of Brazilian jiu-jitsu legend Mario Sperry; even at loss, Kanehara performed impressively, countering and escaping all the bad positions he was caught with by Sperry. Before the next edition of the tournament, Kanehara still fought the former finalist Renato "Babalu" Sobral, losing by decision.

Kanehara returned to KoK format facing popular luta livre practitioner and ADCC Submission Wrestling World Championship champion Alexandre "Cacareco" Ferreira. Although believed to be technically outmatched, Kanehara fought a long, strategic match and ended submitting the decorated grappler by kimura. He then won his next match, quickly knocking out Tommy Sauer with punches, and reached the tournament's final event. There, Kanehara fought and defeated another tough opponent in the form of Dave Menne, dominating the stand-up and knocking him out for a TKO win in round 3, although there was some controversy when Menne's corner protested the stoppage had been premature. Finally, Kanehara faced the eventual winner, Brazilian jiu-jitsu expert Antonio Rodrigo Nogueira, losing a very back and forth grappling contest when he was caught in a choke and forced to submit.

After his KoK tenures, Kanehara went to fight another Brazilian exponent and ADCC winner, Ricardo Arona, who he had already wrestled in ADCC in a losing effort. Though Kanehara was able to survive several striking combinations, holding his own on the mat, he was reversed in one of his own kneebar attempts and submitted. Right after he fought future Ultimate Fighting Championship welterweight champion Matt Hughes, losing by unanimous decision.

=== PRIDE Fighting Championships ===
At the twilight of his career, Kanehara debuted in PRIDE Fighting Championships as a RINGS veteran, and was pitted against a series of world-level opponents as PRIDE was known for doing with Japanese professional wrestlers. The first of them would be Wanderlei Silva in a challenge fight in PRIDE 23 for the PRIDE Middleweight Championship, but Kanehara was knocked down with strikes and hit with soccer kicks and stomps until his corner threw the towel.

Hiromitsu returned to PRIDE as part of the Bushido series, taking on another feared striker in Mirko Cro Cop. The match went to the judges this time, as Kanehara absorbed a surprising amount of punishment, including Mirko's dreaded left high kick. He got similar results against Alistair Overeem in PRIDE 28; he survived a barrage of punches, flying knees and even a German suplex-like takedown, until he was finished by doctor stoppage.

His final appearance in PRIDE was in its 29th event, being defeated by Maurício Rua via TKO (stomp) in the first round.

== Championships and accomplishments ==
- Fighting Network RINGS
  - 2000 RINGS King of Kings Tournament Semifinalist
  - 2000 RINGS Rising Stars Middleweight Tournament Semifinalist
- Union of Wrestling Forces International
  - Junior League Tournament (1992)

== Mixed martial arts record ==
Professional record breakdown
53 matches	21 wins	27 losses
By knockout	6	6
By submission	7	4
By decision	8	17
Draws	5	

Res.	Record	Opponent	Method	Event	Date	Round	Time	Location	Notes
Loss	21–27–5	Yuki Kondo	Decision (points)	U-Spirits: U-Spirits Again	March 9, 2013	3	5:00	Tokyo, Japan	
Loss	21–26–5	Ryuta Sakurai	Decision (unanimous)	DEEP: Haleo Impact	December 22, 2012	3	5:00	Tokyo, Japan	
Draw	21–25–5	Yuki Sasaki	Draw (unanimous)	Grabaka: Grabaka Live 2	October 27, 2012	3	5:00	Tokyo, Japan	
Loss	21–25–4	Yusuke Sakashita	Decision (unanimous)	DEEP: Cage Impact 2012 in Tokyo: Over Again	April 7, 2012	2	5:00	Tokyo, Japan	
Draw	21–24–4	Daijiro Matsui	Draw (majority)	DEEP: 57 Impact	February 8, 2012	2	5:00	Tokyo, Japan	Light Heavyweight bout.
Loss	21–24–3	Hideto Tatsumi	Decision (unanimous)	DEEP: 54 Impact	June 24, 2011	2	5:00	Tokyo, Japan	
Win	21–23–3	Hiroki Sato	Decision (unanimous)	DEEP: 51 Impact	December 11, 2010	2	5:00	Tokyo, Japan	
Draw	20–23–3	Yong Choi	Draw	DEEP: 49 Impact	August 27, 2010	2	5:00	Tokyo, Japan	
Loss	20–23–2	Riki Fukuda	Decision (unanimous)	DEEP: 46 Impact	February 28, 2010	3	5:00	Tokyo, Japan	
Win	20–22–2	Makoto Miyazawa	TKO (punches)	DEEP: 44 Impact	October 10, 2009	1	0:25	Tokyo, Japan	Catchweight (87 kg) bout.
Draw	19–22–2	Ryuta Sakurai	Draw	DEEP: 42 Impact	June 30, 2009	2	5:00	Tokyo, Japan	
Win	19–22–1	Kenji Nagai	TKO (punches)	DEEP: 41 Impact	April 16, 2009	2	3:02	Tokyo, Japan	Catchweight (85 kg) bout.
Loss	18–22–1	Ichiro Kanai	Decision (unanimous)	Pancrase: Shining 8	October 1, 2008	2	5:00	Tokyo, Japan	
Loss	18–21–1	Keiichiro Yamamiya	Decision (unanimous)	Pancrase: Shining 5	June 1, 2008	3	5:00	Tokyo, Japan	
Loss	18–20–1	Izuru Takeuchi	Decision (unanimous)	Pancrase: Shining 2	March 26, 2008	3	5:00	Tokyo, Japan	
Loss	18–19–1	Ryo Kawamura	KO (punches)	Pancrase: Rising 3	March 18, 2007	3	1:36	Tokyo, Japan	
Loss	18–18–1	Marcelo Brito	Technical Submission (armbar)	MARS 5: Marching On	October 28, 2006	1	0:49	Tokyo, Japan	Catchweight (85 kg) bout.
Win	18–17–1	Ruslan Abdulkhamidov	Submission (heel hook)	Kokoro: Kill Or Be Killed	August 15, 2006	1	2:02	Tokyo, Japan	Middleweight debut.
Loss	17–17–1	Kestutis Arbocius	Decision (unanimous)	Pancrase: Blow 3	April 9, 2006	2	5:00	Tokyo, Japan	
Loss	17–16–1	Chalid Arrab	Decision (majority)	HERO'S 2005 in Seoul	November 5, 2005	2	5:00	Seoul, South Korea	Catchweight (90 kg) bout.
Loss	17–15–1	Yuki Kondo	Decision (unanimous)	Pancrase: Spiral 8	October 2, 2005	3	5:00	Yokohama, Japan	
Loss	17–14–1	Iouri Bekichev	TKO	RINGS Russia: CIS vs. The World	August 20, 2005	1	N/A	Lithuania	Heavyweight bout.
Loss	17–13–1	Maurício Rua	TKO (stomp)	PRIDE 29: Fists of Fire	February 20, 2005	1	1:40	Saitama, Japan	
Loss	17–12–1	Alistair Overeem	TKO (doctor stoppage)	PRIDE 28	October 31, 2004	2	3:52	Saitama, Japan	
Loss	17–11–1	Mirko Cro Cop	Decision (unanimous)	PRIDE Bushido 3	May 23, 2004	2	5:00	Yokohama, Japan	Heavyweight bout.
Loss	17–10–1	Wanderlei Silva	TKO (corner stoppage)	PRIDE 23	November 24, 2002	1	3:40	Tokyo, Japan	For the PRIDE Middleweight Championship.
Draw	17–9–1	Mikhail Ilyukhin	Draw	RINGS: World Title Series Grand Final	February 15, 2002	3	5:00	Yokohama, Japan	
Win	17–9	Paul Cahoon	Decision (split)	RINGS: World Title Series 5	December 21, 2001	3	5:00	Yokohama, Japan	
Win	16–9	Kelly Jacobs	TKO (lost points)	RINGS: World Title Series 4	October 20, 2001	2	1:51	Tokyo, Japan	
Loss	15–9	Matt Hughes	Decision (majority)	RINGS: 10th Anniversary	August 11, 2001	3	5:00	Tokyo, Japan	
Loss	15–8	Ricardo Arona	Submission (kneebar)	RINGS: World Title Series 2	June 15, 2001	2	0:53	Yokohama, Japan	2001 RINGS Middleweight Championship Tournament First Round.
Loss	15–7	Antônio Rodrigo Nogueira	Submission (rear-naked choke)	RINGS: King of Kings 2000 Final	February 24, 2001	2	0:27	Tokyo, Japan	2000 RINGS King of Kings Semifinals.
Win	15–6	Dave Menne	TKO (punches)	RINGS: King of Kings 2000 Final	February 24, 2001	3	3:24	Tokyo, Japan	2000 RINGS King of Kings Third Round.
Win	14–6	Tommy Sauer	TKO (punches)	RINGS: King of Kings 2000 Block B	December 22, 2000	1	4:14	Osaka, Japan	2000 RINGS King of Kings Second Round.
Win	13–6	Alexandre Ferreira	Submission (kimura)	RINGS: King of Kings 2000 Block B	December 22, 2000	2	2:45	Osaka, Japan	2000 RINGS King of Kings First Round.
Win	12–6	Josh Hall	Decision (split)	RINGS USA: Rising Stars Block B	July 22, 2000	2	5:00	Hawaii, United States	2000 RINGS Rising Stars Middleweight Tournament Quarterfinals; later pulled out of tournament.
Win	11–6	Adrian Serrano	Submission (armlock)	RINGS USA: Rising Stars Block B	July 22, 2000	1	2:07	Hawaii, United States	2000 RINGS Rising Stars Middleweight Tournament First Round.
Loss	10–6	Renato Sobral	Decision (unanimous)	RINGS: Millennium Combine 2	June 15, 2000	2	5:00	Tokyo, Japan	
Loss	10–5	Mario Sperry	Decision (majority)	C2K: Colosseum 2000	May 26, 2000	2	5:00	Japan	
Win	10–4	Valentijn Overeem	KO (punch)	RINGS Holland: There Can Only Be One Champion	February 6, 2000	1	4:14	Netherlands	
Loss	9–4	Dan Henderson	Decision (majority)	RINGS: King of Kings 1999 Block A	October 28, 1999	2	5:00	Tokyo, Japan	1999 RINGS King of Kings Tournament Second Round.
Win	9–3	Jeremy Horn	Decision (majority)	RINGS: King of Kings 1999 Block A	October 28, 1999	2	5:00	Tokyo, Japan	1999 RINGS King of Kings Tournament First Round.
Win	8–3	Wataru Sakata	Decision (lost points)	RINGS: Rise 5th	August 19, 1999	3	5:00	Japan	
Win	7–3	Masayuki Naruse	Decision (unanimous)	RINGS: Rise 4th	June 24, 1999	3	10:00	Japan	
Loss	6–3	Valentijn Overeem	TKO (corner stoppage)	RINGS: Rise 3rd	May 22, 1999	1	4:35	Japan	
Loss	6–2	Kiyoshi Tamura	Submission (armbar)	RINGS: Rise 1st	March 20, 1999	3	0:14	Japan	
Loss	6–1	Ricardo Morais	Decision	RINGS: Final Capture	February 21, 1999	5	5:00	Japan	
Win	6–0	Hans Nijman	Submission (armbar)	RINGS: World Mega Battle Tournament	December 23, 1998	1	9:04	Japan	
Win	5–0	Lee Hasdell	Decision	NOTS 2: Night of the Samurai 2	October 11, 1998	1	15:00	England	
Win	4–0	Dick Vrij	Submission (armbar)	RINGS: Capture '98	July 20, 1998	1	4:22	Yokohama, Japan	
Win	3–0	Sander MacKilljan	Submission (armlock)	RINGS: Fourth Fighting Integration	June 27, 1998	1	3:26	Tokyo, Japan	
Win	2–0	Lee Hasdell	Decision	RINGS: Third Fighting Integration	May 29, 1998	1	30:00	Tokyo, Japan	
Win	1–0	Sander Thonhauser	Submission (achilles lock)	RINGS: Second Fighting Integration	April 16, 1998	1	6:26	Osaka, Japan	

== Kickboxing record ==
Kickboxing record
0 wins, 1 loss
Date	Result	Opponent	Event	Location	Method	Round	Time	Record
March 1, 1996	Loss	(Thailand) Changpuek Kiatsongrit	UWF-i High Tension	Tokyo, Japan	Decision (unanimous)	5	3:00	0–1
Legend: Win Loss Draw/No contest

== Submission grappling record ==
LOSS: Ricardo Arona || Points || ADCC -99 kg First Round || 2000 ||
