= Kęstutis (name) =

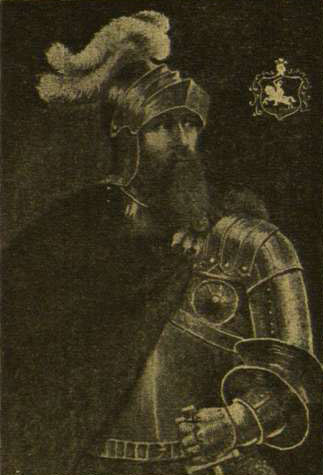
- Grand Duke of Lithuania Kęstutis
- Gender: Male

Origin
- Region of origin: Lithuania

Other names
- Related names: Kęstaras, Kęstautas

Kęstutis (c. 1297–1382) was a Lithuanian medieval monarch.

Kęstutis is also a common Lithuanian masculine given name. It may be shortened as Kęstas, although the latter may be a given name in itself. Notable people with the name include:

- Kęstutis Andziulis (born 1948), Lithuanian artist and art restorer
- Kęstutis Antanėlis (born 1951), Lithuanian composer, architect and sculptor
- Kęstutis Bartkėnas (born 1967), Lithuanian track and field athlete and Paralympic medalist
- Kęstutis Bilius (born 1958), Lithuanian politician
- Kęstutis Budrys (born 1980), Lithuanian politician
- Kęstutis Bulota (1896–1941), Lithuanian multi-sport athlete and Olympic competitor
- Kęstutis Cicėnas (born 1993), Lithuanian actor
- Kęstutis Dirgėla (born 1960), Lithuanian engineer and politician
- Kęstutis Glaveckas (1949–2021), Lithuanian politician
- Kęstutis Grinius (born 1956), Lithuanian politician
- Kęstutis Ivaškevičius (born 1985), Lithuanian footballer
- Kęstutis Kasparavičius (born 1954), Lithuanian author and book illustrator
- Kęstutis Keblys (born 1976), Lithuanian rower and Olympic competitor
- Kęstutis Kemzūra (born 1970), Lithuanian basketball player and coach
- Kęstutis Kėvalas (born 1972), Lithianian Roman Catholic auxiliary Bishop of Kaunas
- Kęstutis Krasauskas (born 1968), Lithuanian artist and sculptor
- Kęstutis Lapinskas (born 1937), Lithuanian legal scholar
- Kęstutis Latoža (born 1950), Lithuanian footballer and manager
- Kęstutis Lupeikis (born 1962), Lithuanian architect and painter
- Kęstutis Marčiulionis (born 1977), Lithuanian basketball point guard
- Kęstutis Mažeika (born 1982), Lithuanian politician
- Kęstutis Nakas (born 1953), American playwright, author, performer, director and teacher
- Kęstutis Navickas (born 1970), Lithuanian politician and environmentalist
- Kęstutis Navickas (born 1984), Lithuanian badminton player and Olympic competitor
- Kęstutis Orentas (born 1939), Lithuanian long-distance runner
- Kęstutis Rimkus (born 1953), Lithuanian politician
- Kęstutis Ruzgys (born 1962), Lithuanian football forward
- Kęstutis Šapka (1949–2025), Lithuanian high jumper and Olympic competitor
- Kęstutis Šeštokas (born 1976), Lithuanian basketball power forward
- Kęstutis Skučas (born 1967), Lithuanian Paralympic athlete
- Kęstutis Smirnovas (born 1976), Lithuanian mixed martial artist
- Kęstutis Stoškus (born 1951), Lithuanian architectural photographer and museum curator
- Kęstutis Vilkauskas (born 1969), Lithuanian politician

== See also ==
- Kęstutis military district
