= List of Pride Fighting Championships alumni =

Pride Fighting Championships
- Leader: FIGHTERS Total: 310 JPN 90 USA 77 BRA 52 RUS 15 NLD 12 KOR 10 FRA 7 AUS 5 CAN 5 GBR 4 HRV 3 NZL 3 ARM 2 DEU 2 LTU 2 MEX 2 NOR 2 ZAF 2 AZE 1 BHS 1 BUR 1 CMR 1 CUB 1 GEO 1 IDN 1 POL 1 ROU 1 SUR 1 SWE 1 TON 1 TTO 1 TUR 1 UKR 1

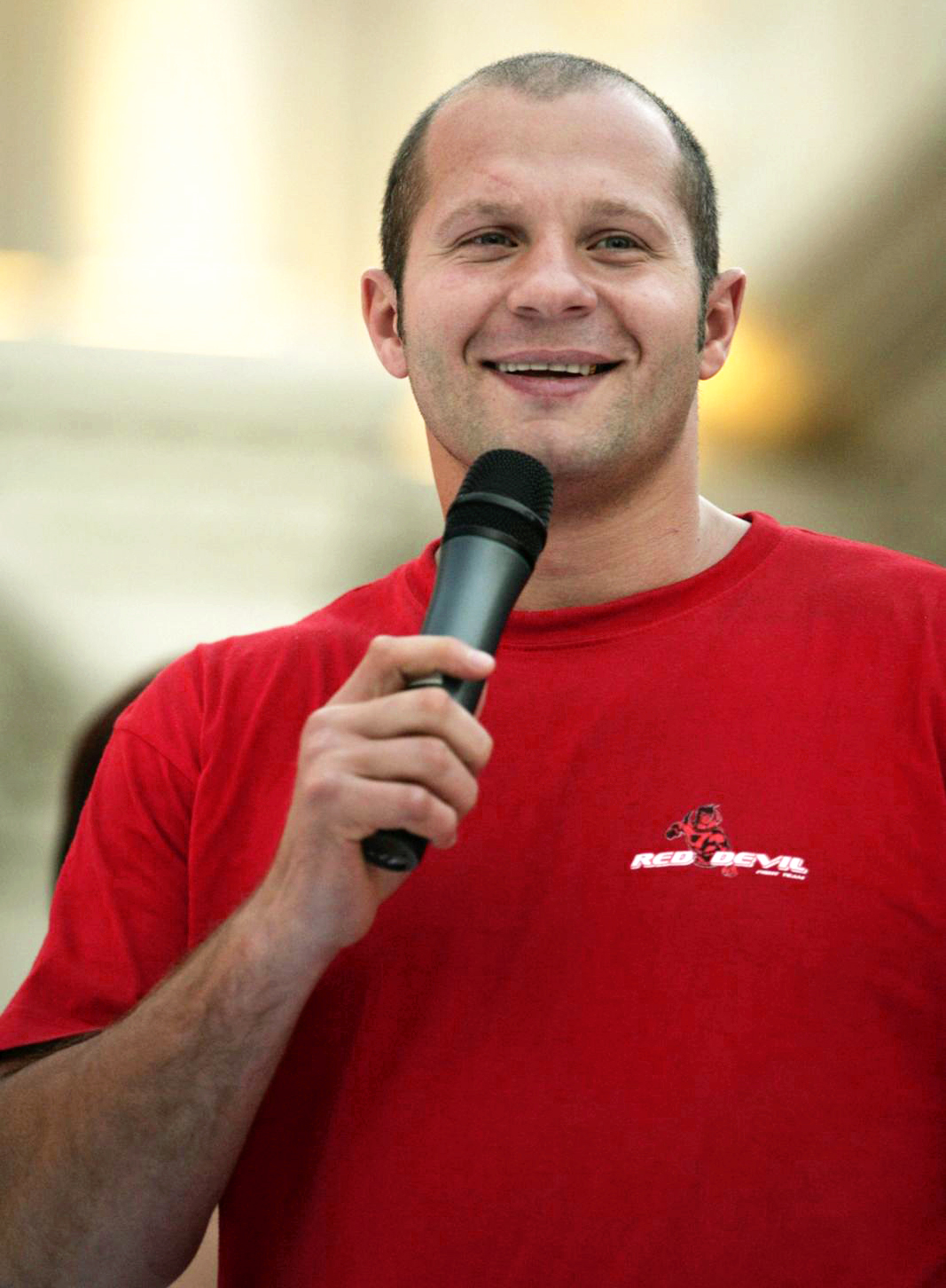
Fedor Emelianenko

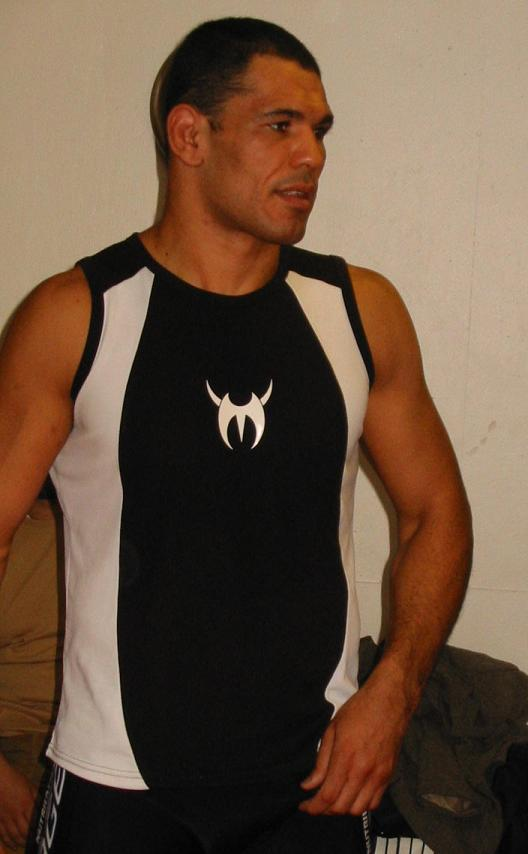
Antônio Rodrigo Nogueira

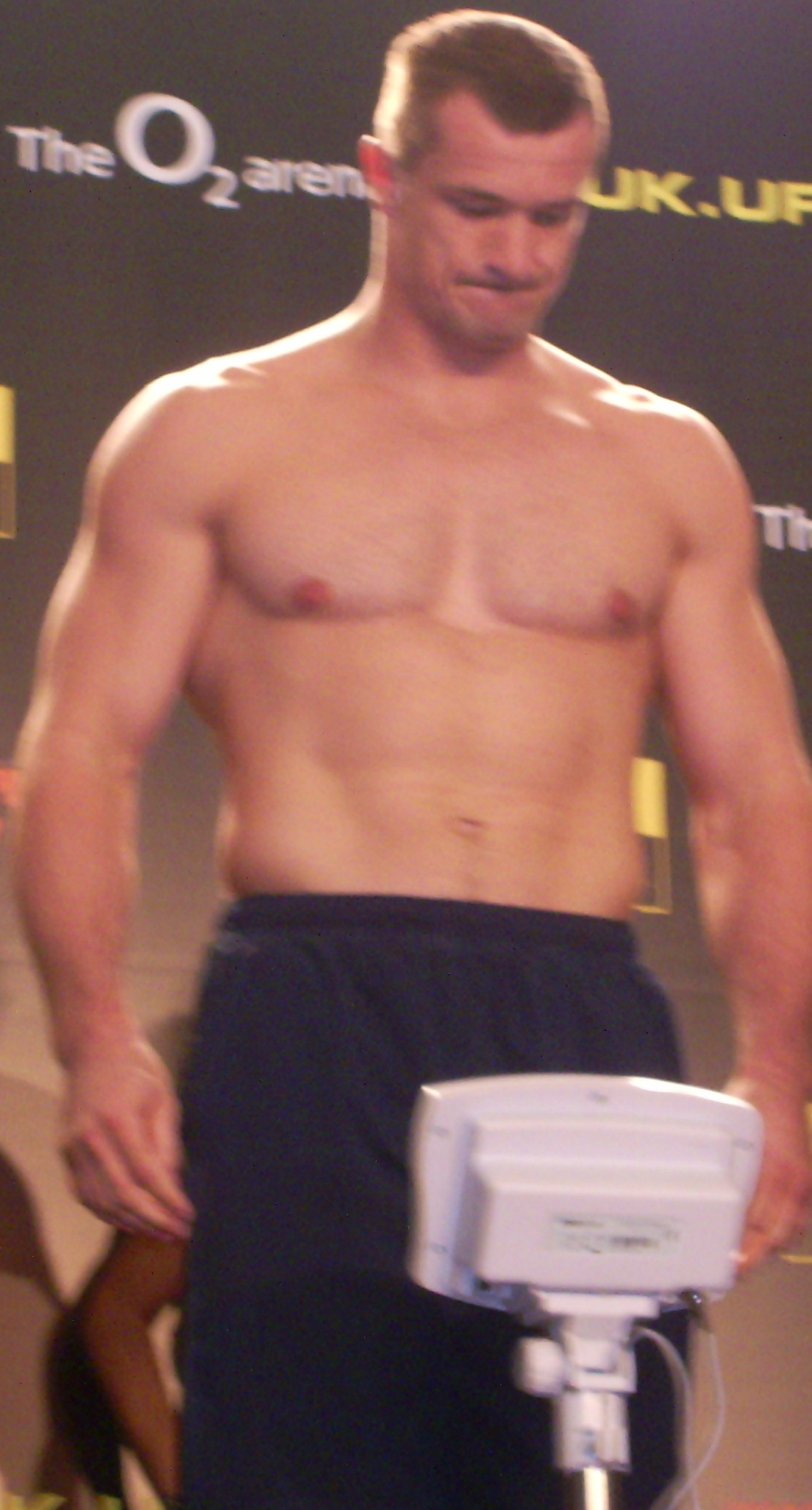
Mirko Filipović

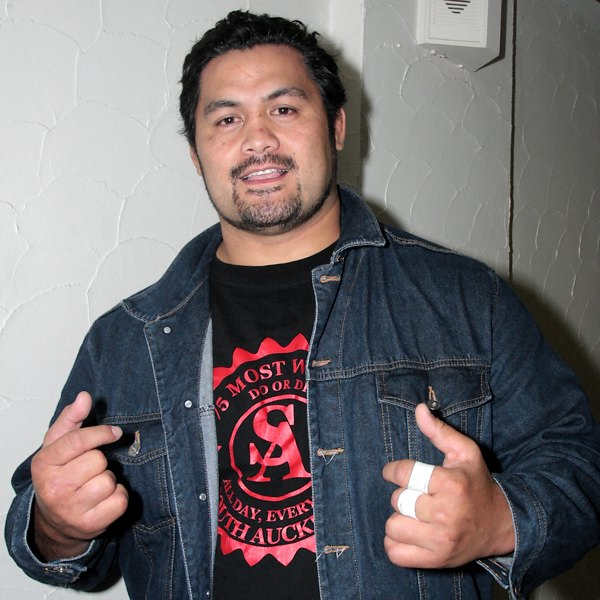
Mark Hunt

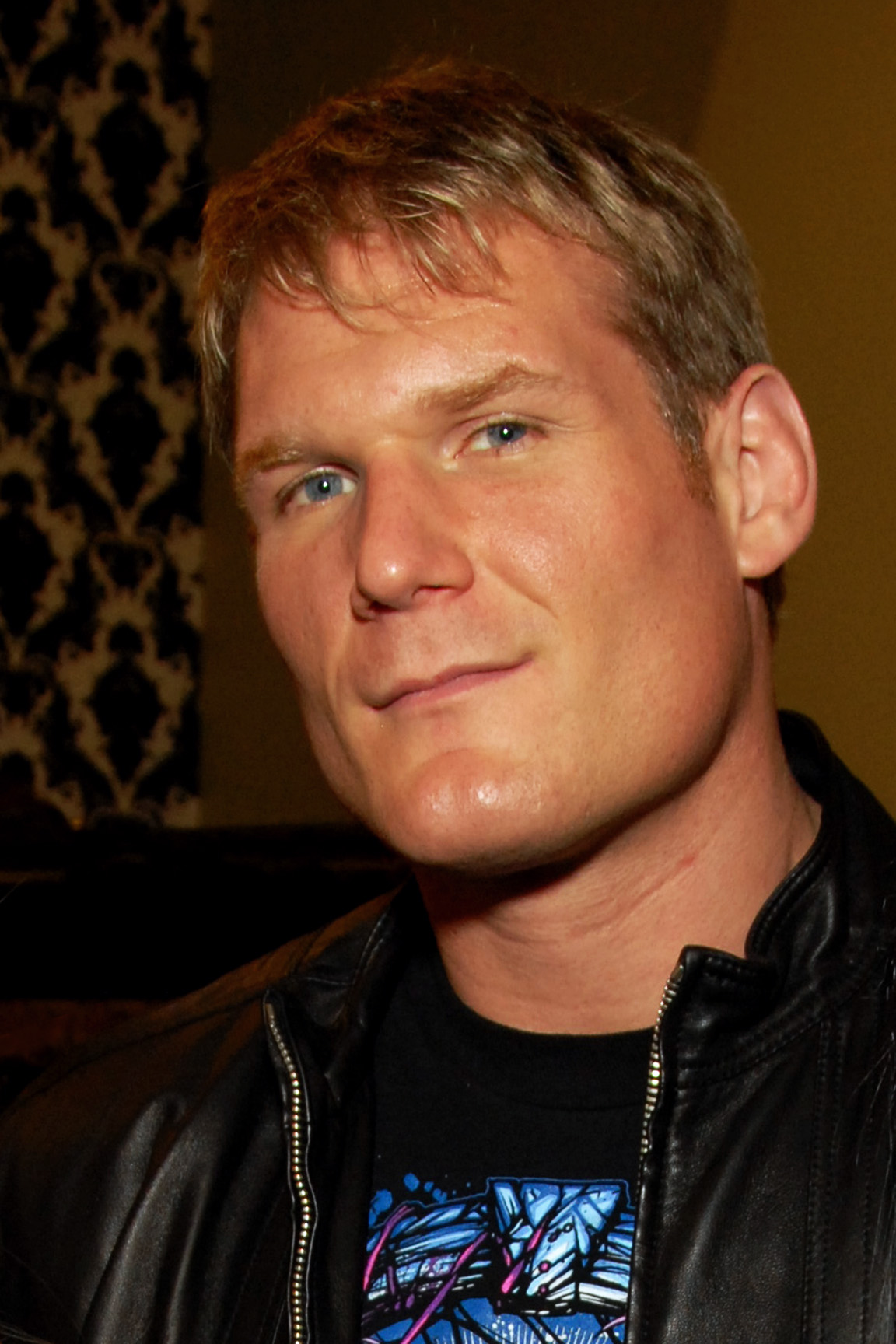
Josh Barnett

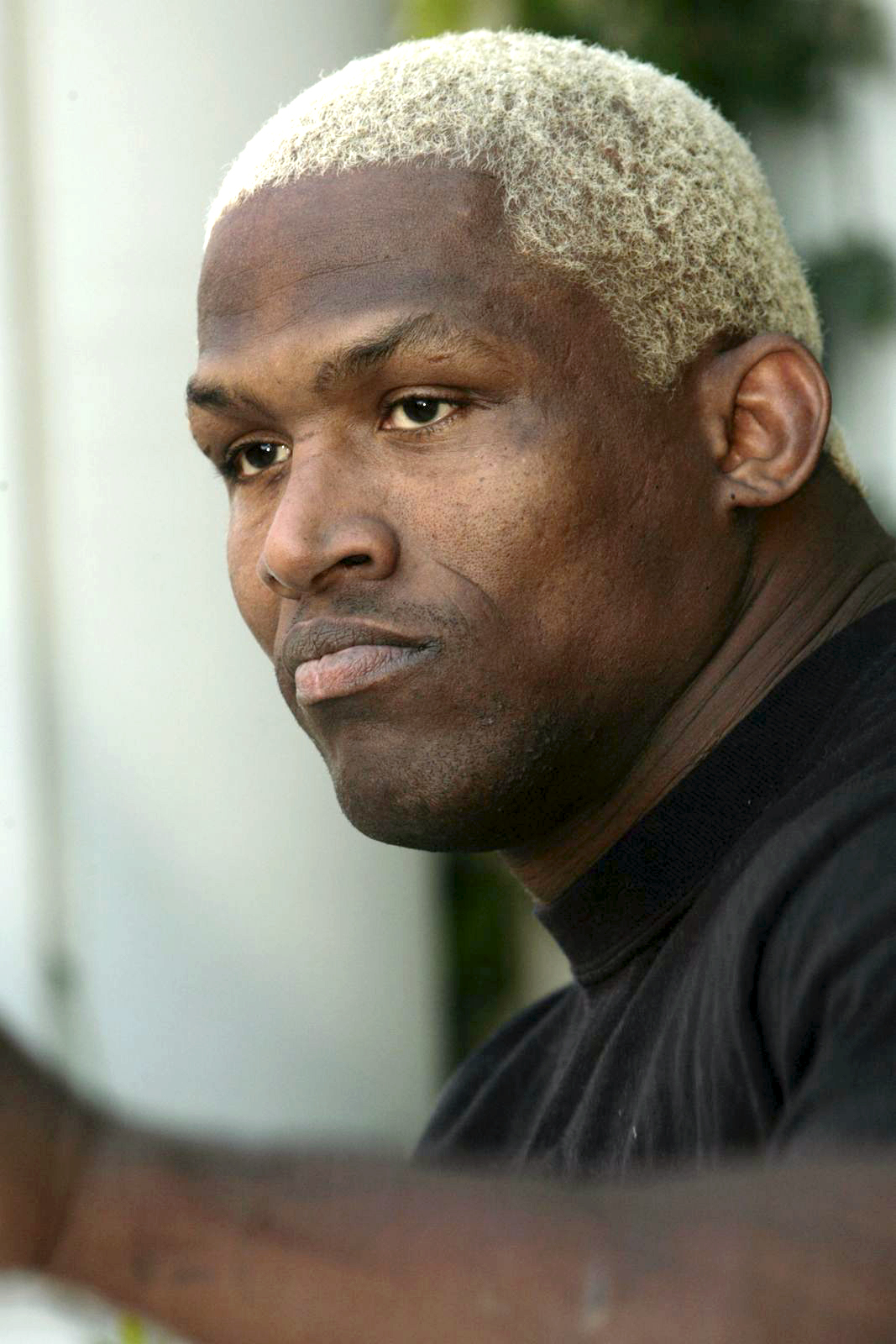
Kevin Randleman

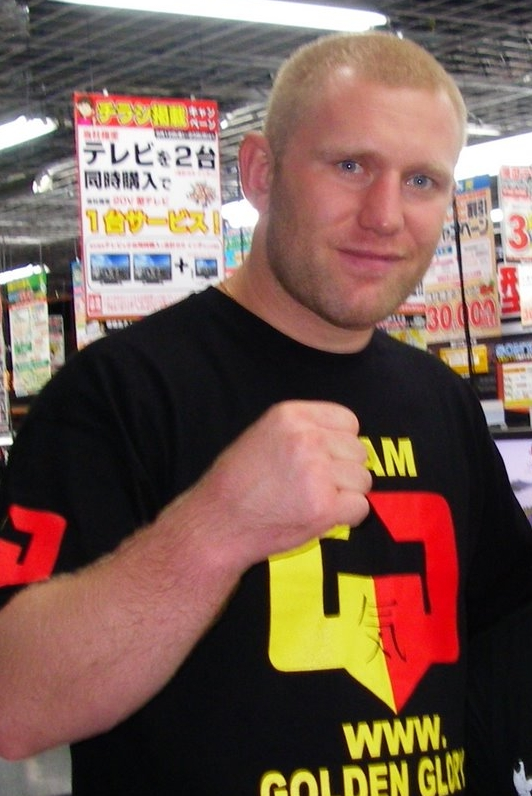
Sergei Kharitonov

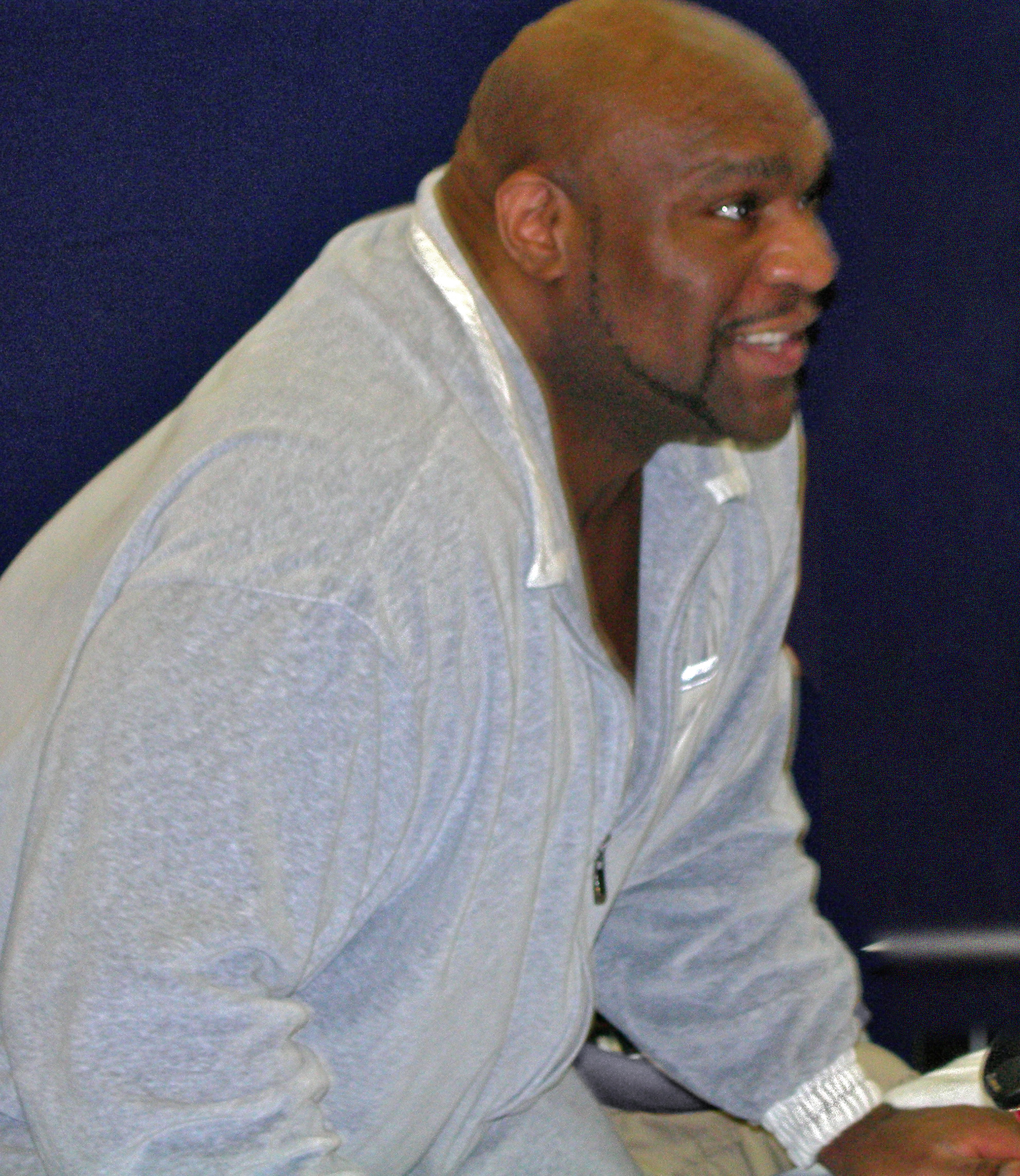
Bob Sapp

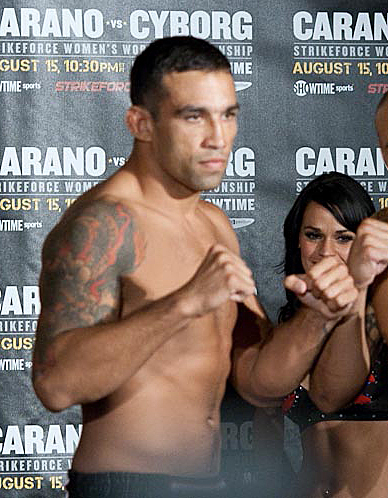
Fabrício Werdum

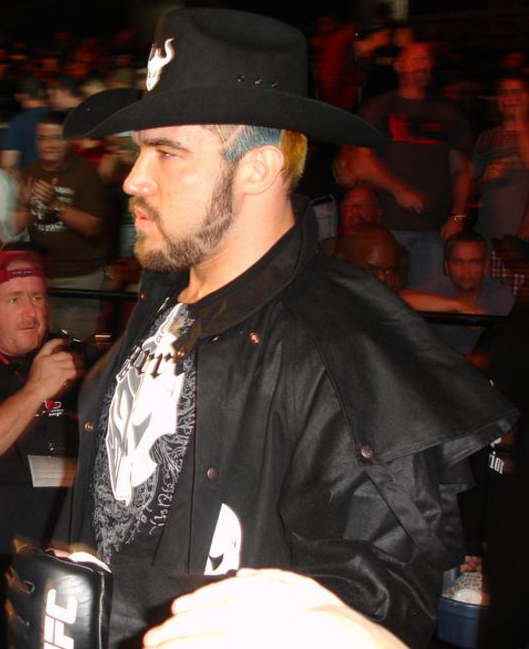
Heath Herring

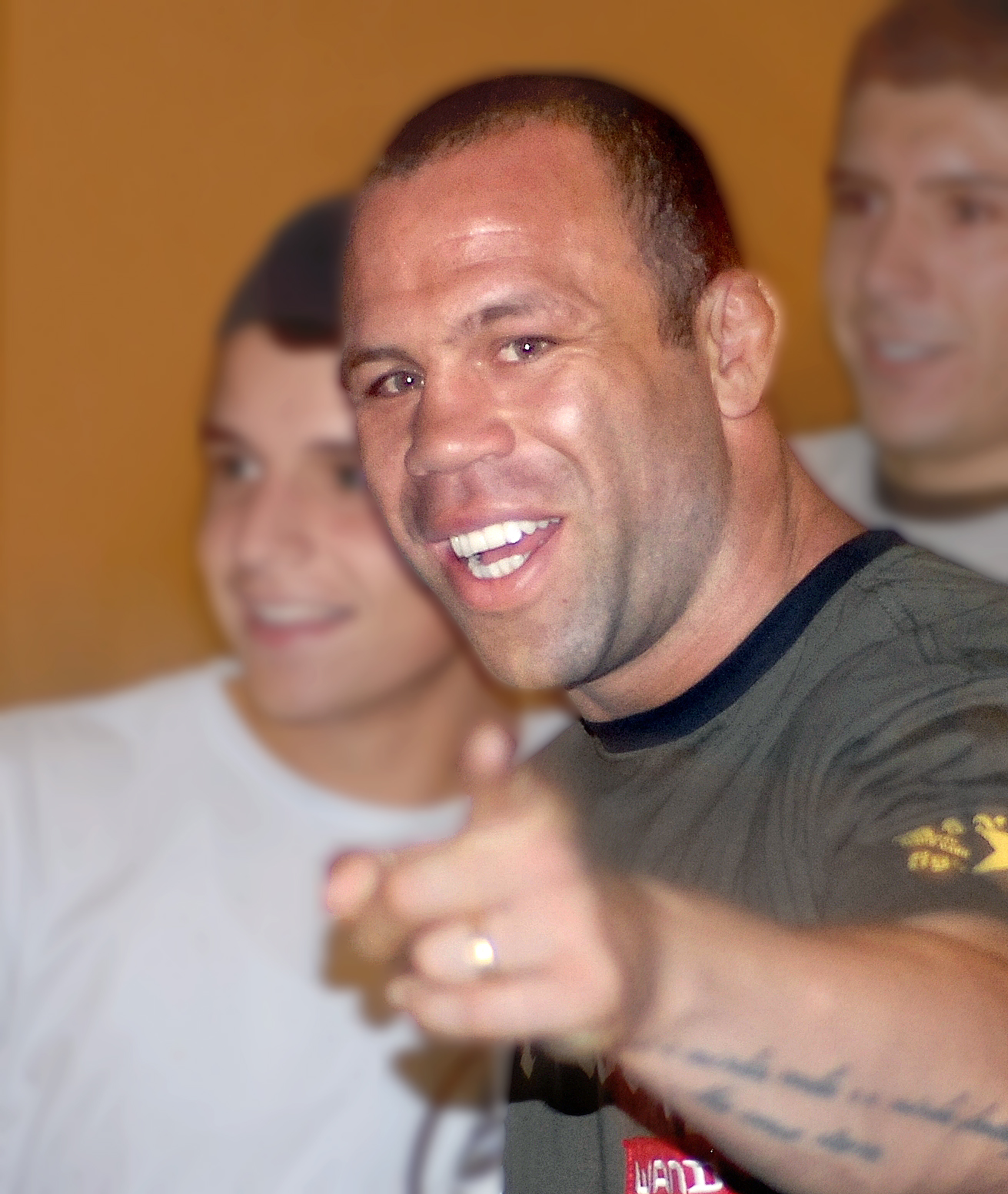
Wanderlei Silva

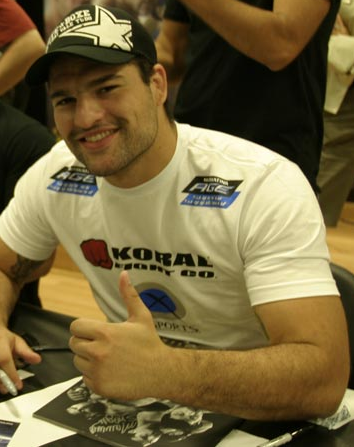
Maurício Rua

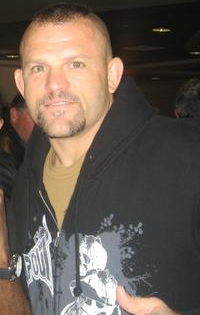
Chuck Liddell

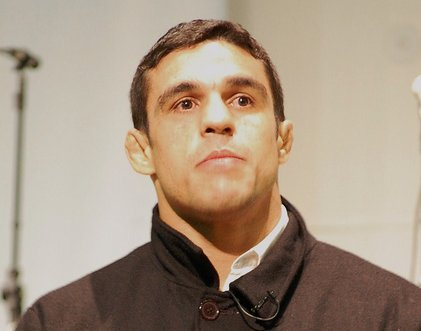
Vitor Belfort

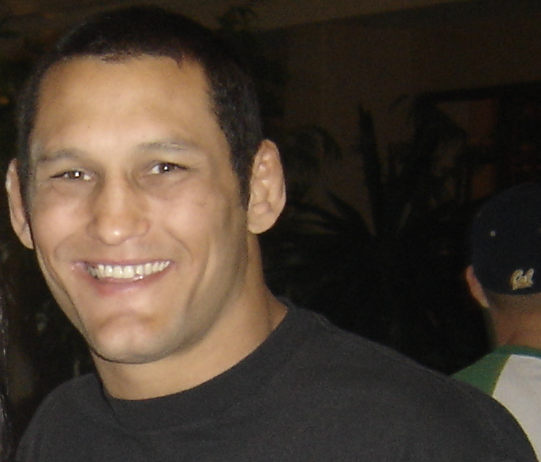
Dan Henderson

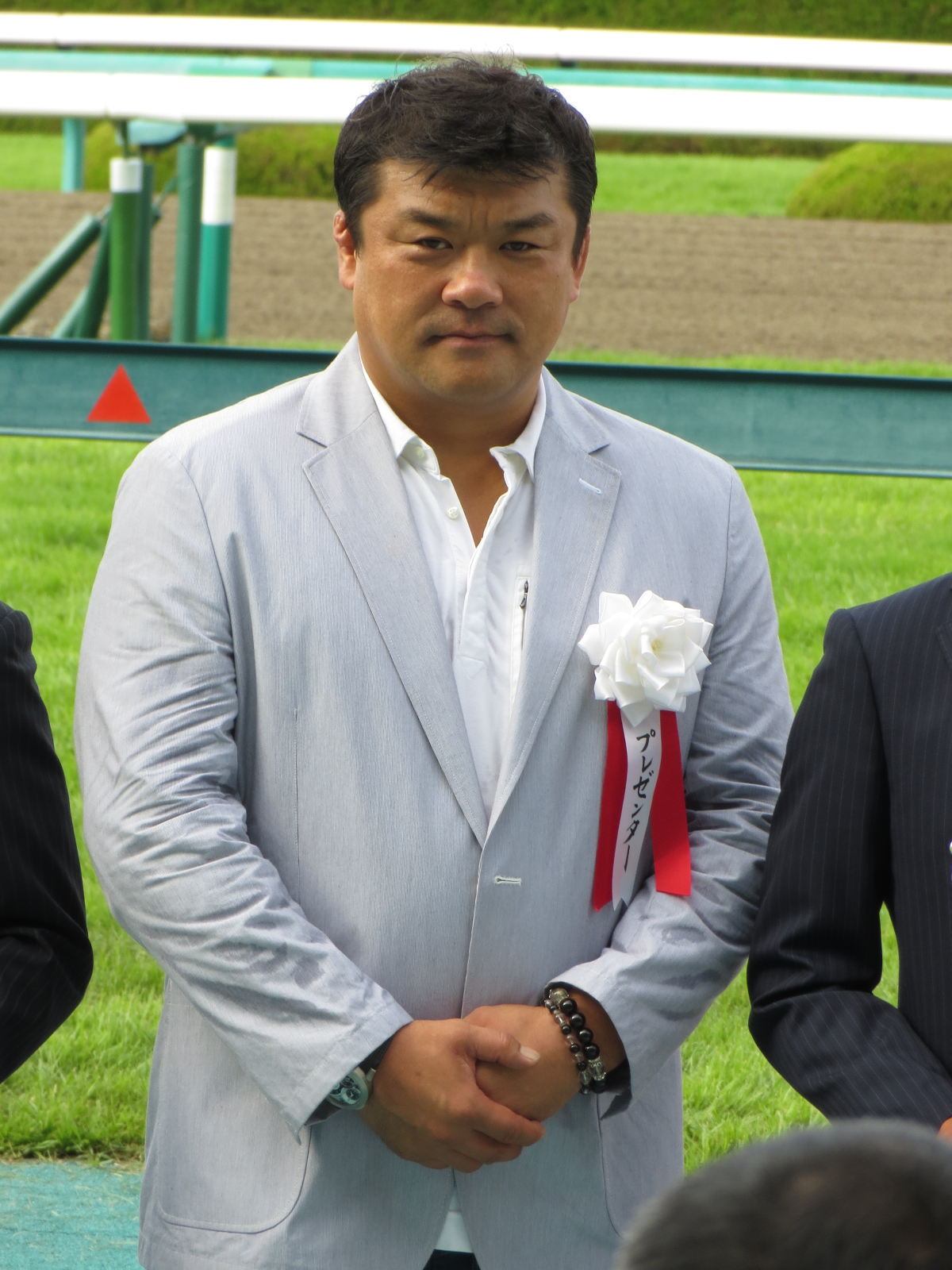
Hidehiko Yoshida

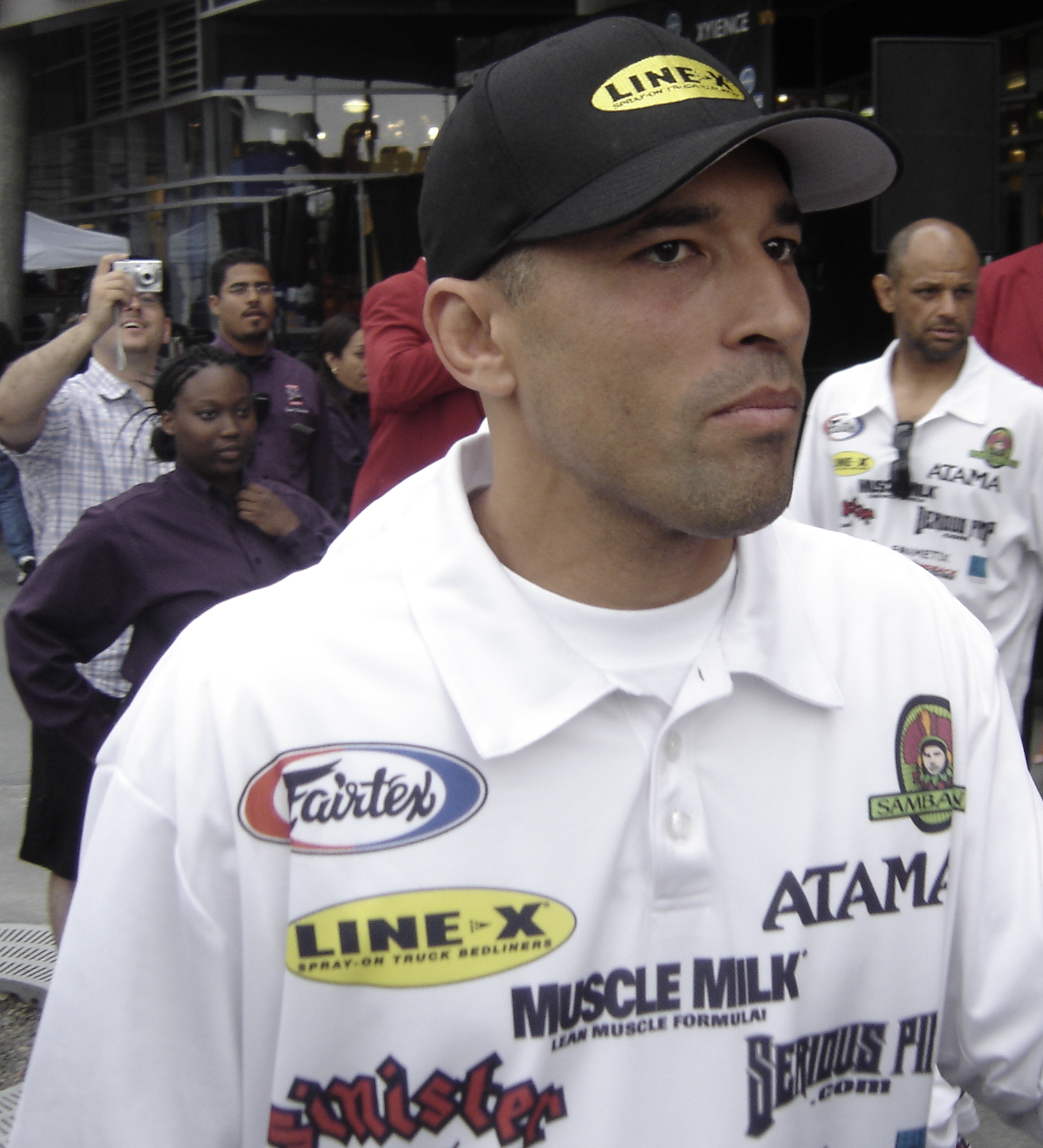
Royce Gracie

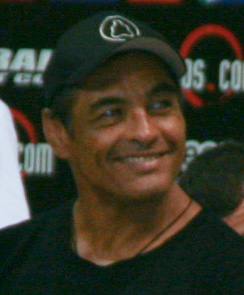
Rickson Gracie

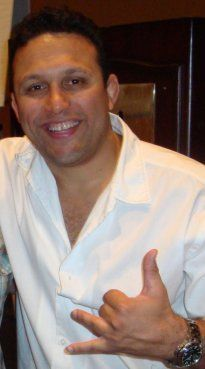
Renzo Gracie

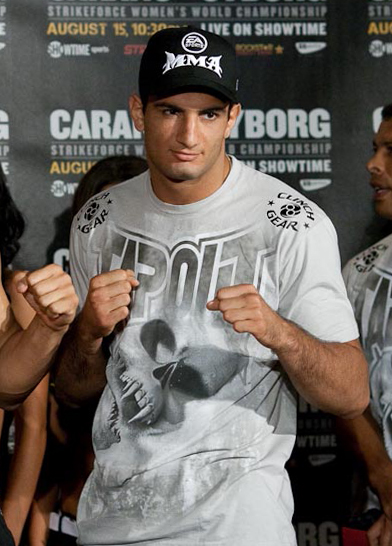
Gegard Mousasi

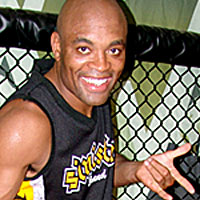
Anderson Silva

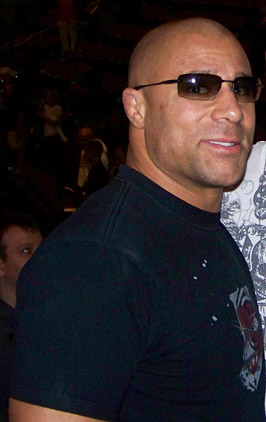
Frank Trigg

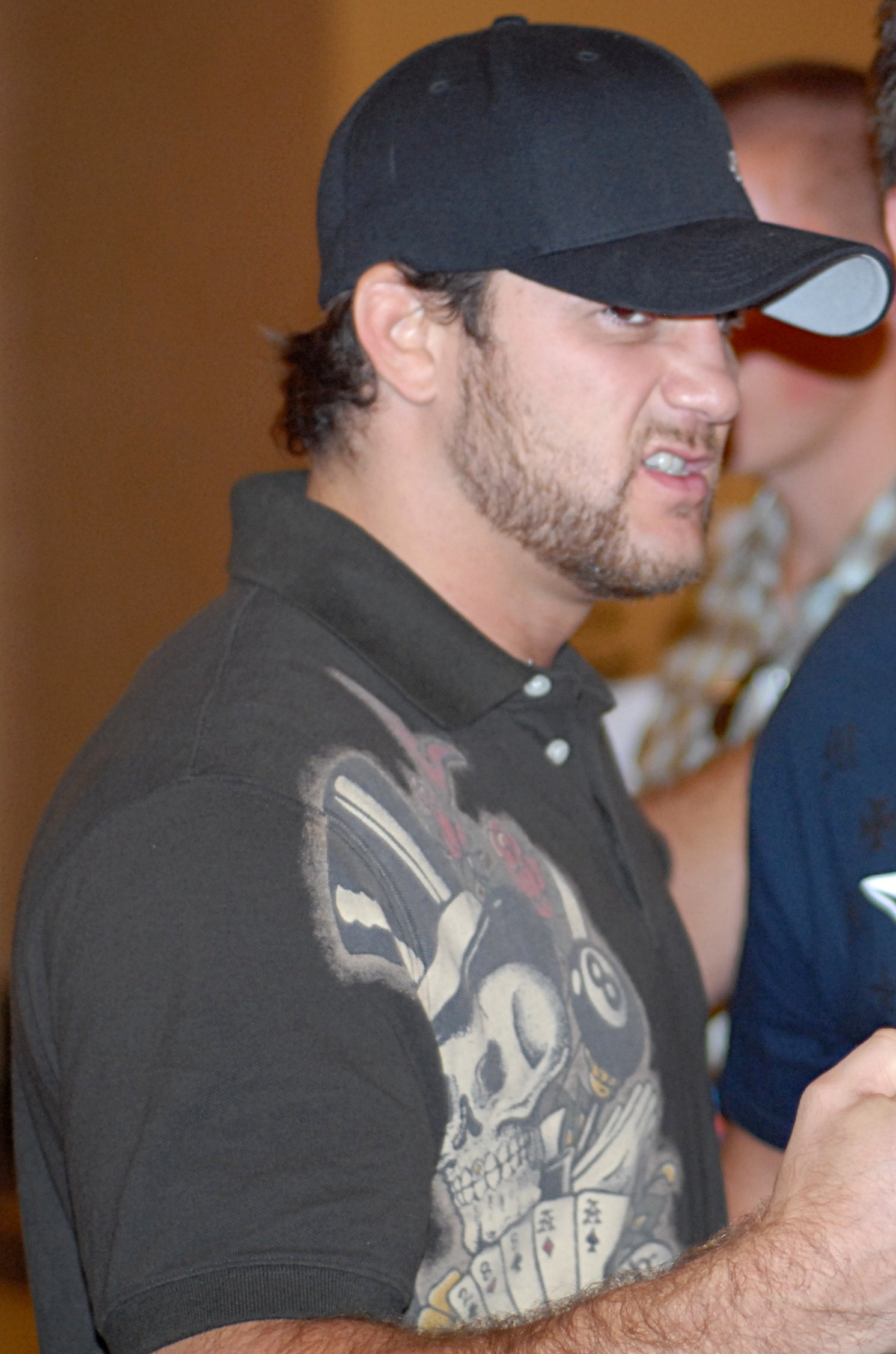
Phil Baroni

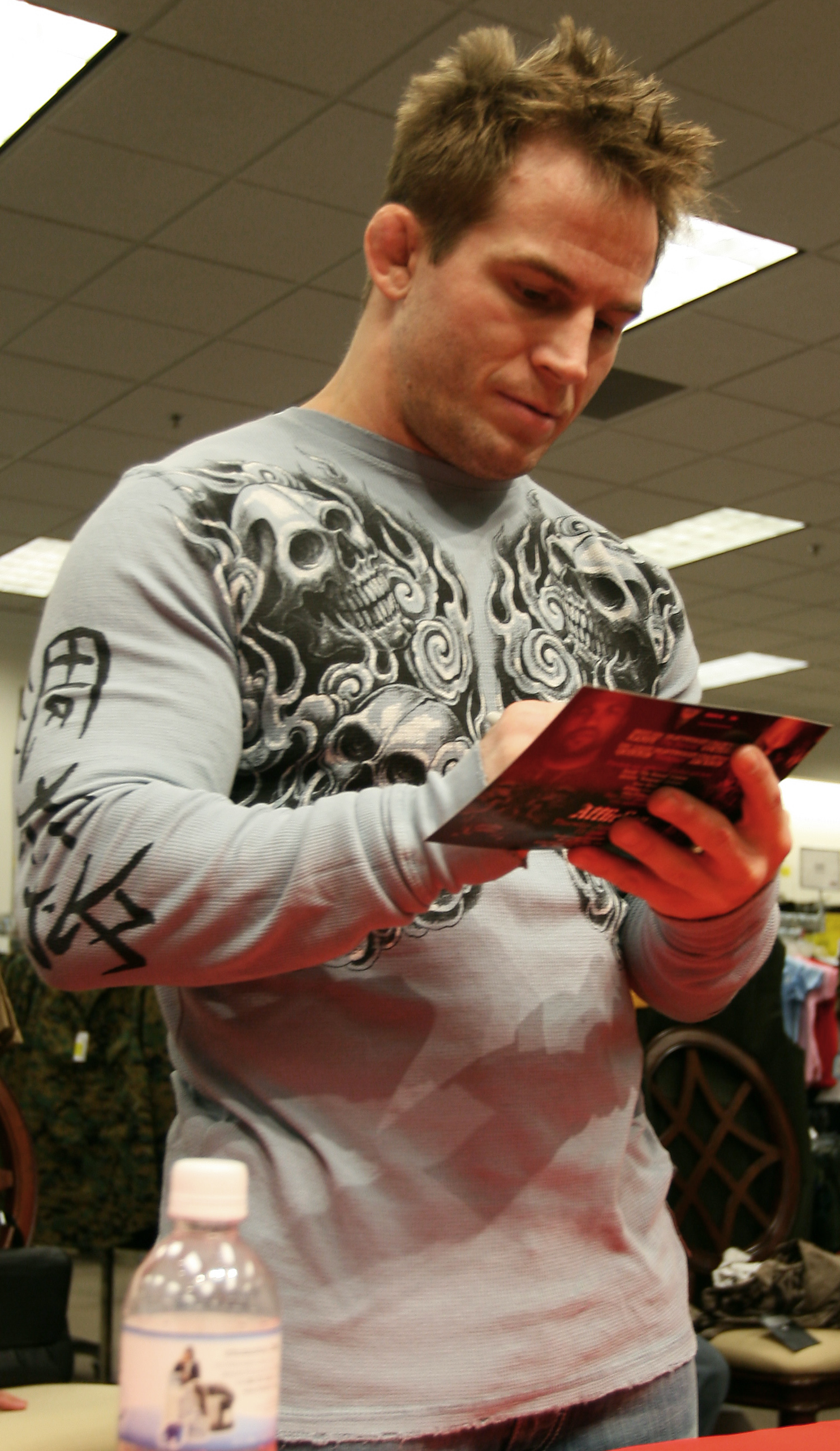
Sean Sherk

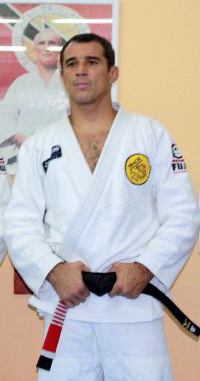
Royler Gracie

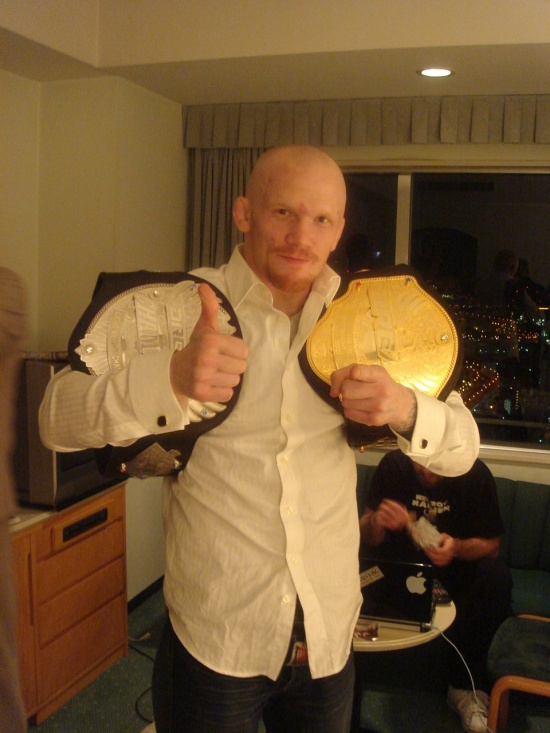
Joachim Hansen

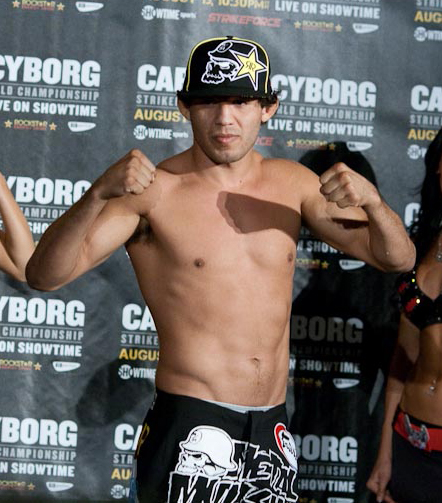
Gilbert Melendez

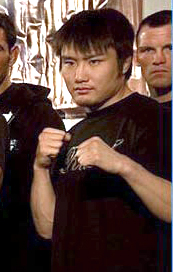
Takanori Gomi

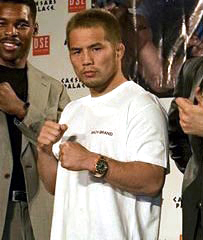
Hayato Sakurai

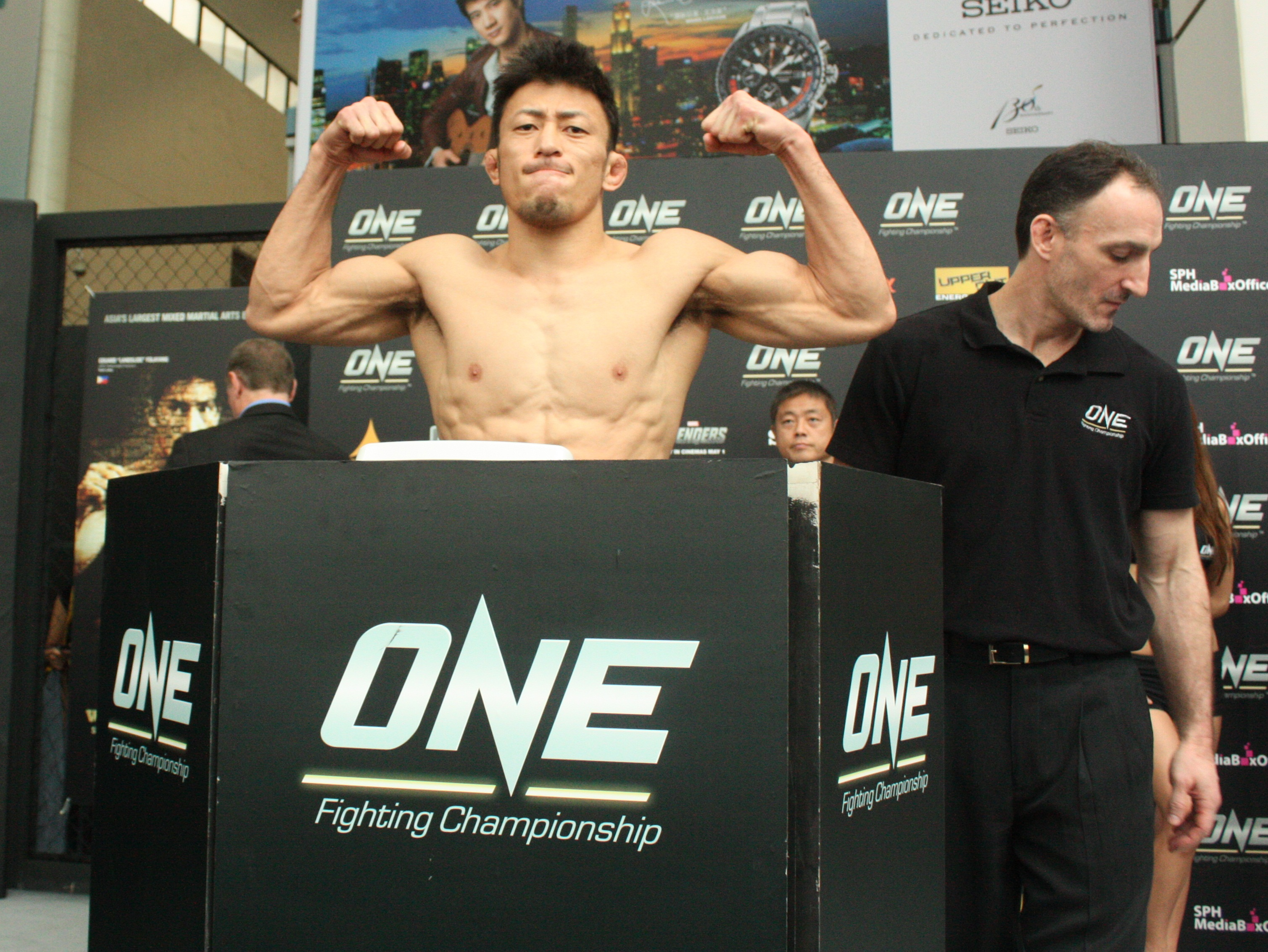
Tatsuya Kawajiri

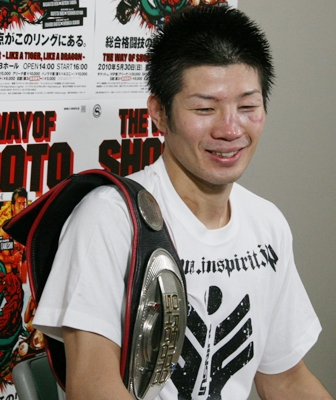
Hatsu Hioki

This is a list of fighters who have participated in the Pride Fighting Championships. (Note: Unless otherwise cited, all fighters' names, nicknames, records and weight classes are retrieved from PrideFC.com and Sherdog.com)

== List ==
ISO	Name	Nickname	Record: W–L–D (NC) (Note: Pride FC only.)	Weight division (Note: For more information about the four Pride FC weight divisions, see the main article: Pride Fighting Championships (weight classes).)
ARM	Amar Suloev		2–2–0 (0)	Welterweight
ARM	Gegard Mousasi	The Dreamcatcher	2–1–0 (0)	Welterweight
AUS	Mal Foki	Twin Tiger	0–1–0 (0)	Heavyweight
AUS	Matt Foki	Twin Tiger	0–1–0 (0)	Heavyweight
AUS	Nathan Jones		0–1–0 (0)	Heavyweight
AUS	Soa Palelei	The Hulk	0–1–0 (0)	Heavyweight
AUS	Tasis Petridis	Tosca	1*–0–0 (0)	Heavyweight
AZE	Mahmud Aliyev		0–1–0 (0)	Middleweight
BHS	Yves Edwards		2–1–0 (0)	Lightweight
BRA	Allan Goes		2–2–1 (0)	Middleweight
BRA	Anderson Silva		3–2–0 (0)	Welterweight; Middleweight
BRA	Antônio Rodrigo Nogueira	Minotauro	17–3–0 (1)	Heavyweight
BRA	Antônio Rogério Nogueira	Minotouro	8–2–0 (0)	Middleweight
BRA	Antônio Schembri	Nino; Elvis	3–3–0 (0)	Welterweight
BRA	Assuério Silva		2–1–0 (0)	Heavyweight
BRA	Carlos Barreto	Carlão	1–1–0 (0)	Heavyweight
BRA	Cristiano Marcello		0–1–0 (0)	Lightweight
BRA	Crosley Gracie		1–1–0 (0)	Welterweight
BRA	Daniel Acácio		2–1–0 (0)	Welterweight
BRA	Daniel Gracie		2–1–0 (0)	Middleweight
BRA	Ebenezer Fontes Braga	The Pitbull	1–2–0 (0)	Middleweight
BRA	Edson Claas Vieira	Draggo	0–2–0 (0)	Heavyweight
BRA	Evangelista Santos	Cyborg	1–1–0 (0)	Middleweight
BRA	Fabiano Iha		0–1–0 (0)	Welterweight
BRA	Fabio Mello		0–1–0 (0)	Lightweight
BRA	Fabrício Werdum		4–2–0 (0)	Heavyweight
BRA	Francisco Bueno		1–1–0 (0)	Heavyweight
BRA	Hugo Duarte		0–1–0 (0)	Heavyweight
BRA	Jean Silva	White Bear	0–1–0 (0)	Lightweight
BRA	Johil de Oliveira		0–3–0 (0)	Welterweight
BRA	Jorge Patino	Macaco	0–1–0 (0)	Welterweight
BRA	José Landi	Pelé	0–2–0 (0)	Welterweight
BRA	Juan Mott		0–1–0 (0)	Welterweight
BRA	Luciano Azevedo		0–1–0 (0)	Lightweight
BRA	Luiz Azeredo		2–3–0 (0)	Lightweight
BRA	Luiz Firmino	Buscapé	3–2–0 (0)	Lightweight
BRA	Marco Ruas	The King of the Streets	1–1–0 (0)	Heavyweight
BRA	Marcus Aurélio	Maximus	3–3–0 (0)	Lightweight
BRA	Mario Sperry	Zen Machine	4–3–0 (0)	Heavyweight
BRA	Maurício Rua	Shogun	12–1–0 (0)	Middleweight
BRA	Milton Vieira	Miltinho	0–1–0 (0)	Lightweight
BRA	Murilo Bustamante		4–5–0 (0)	Welterweight
BRA	Murilo Rua	Ninja	6–7–0 (0)	Welterweight; Middleweight; Heavyweight
BRA	Paulo César da Silva	Giant Silva	1–6–0 (0)	Heavyweight
BRA	Paulo Filho	Paulão	8–0–0 (0)	Welterweight
BRA	Pedro Otávio	The Pedro	0–1–0 (0)	Heavyweight
BRA	Pedro Rizzo	The Rock	0–2–0 (0)	Heavyweight
BRA	Ralph Gracie		1–1–0 (0)	Lightweight
BRA	Renzo Gracie		3–4–1 (0)	Welterweight
BRA	Ricardo Almeida	Cachorrão	2–0–0 (0)	Welterweight
BRA	Ricardo Arona		8–4–0 (0)	Middleweight
BRA	Ricardo Morais	The Mutant	1–2–0 (0)	Heavyweight
BRA	Rickson Gracie		2–0–0 (0)	Welterweight; Openweight
BRA	Rodrigo Gracie		4–0–0 (0)	Welterweight
BRA	Royce Gracie		1–1–1 (0)	Welterweight; Openweight
BRA	Royler Gracie		1–1–0 (0)	Lightweight; Openweight
BRA	Ryan Gracie		5–2–0 (0)	Welterweight
BRA	Vitor Belfort	The Phenom	5–3–0 (0)	Middleweight; Heavyweight
BRA	Wágner da Conceição Martins	Zuluzinho	1–3–0 (0)	Heavyweight
BRA	Wallid Ismail		1–2–0 (0)	Welterweight
BRA	Wanderlei Silva	The Axe Murderer	22–4–1 (1)	Middleweight; Heavyweight
BUR	Xue Do Won		0–1–0 (0)	Lightweight
CAN	Carlos Newton	The Ronin	5–4–0 (0)	Welterweight
CAN	Demetrius Gioulacos		0–1–0 (0)	Welterweight
CAN	Denis Kang		6–1–0 (0)	Welterweight
CAN	John Alessio	The Natural	1–0–0 (0)	Lightweight
CAN	Travis Galbraith	Gladiator	0–1–0 (0)	Middleweight
CMR	Rameau Thierry Sokoudjou		2–0–0 (0)	Middleweight
CUB	Hector Lombard		0–2–0 (0)	Welterweight
DEU	Chalid Arrab	Die Faust	1–1–0 (0)	Heavyweight
DEU	Stefan Leko	Blitz	0–3–0 (0)	Heavyweight
FRA	Bertrand Amoussou		1–0–0 (0)	Middleweight
FRA	Cyrille Diabaté		0–1–0 (0)	Middleweight
FRA	David Baron		0–1–0 (0)	Lightweight
FRA	Gilles Arsene		0–1–0 (0)	Welterweight
FRA	Gregory Bouchelaghem		0–1–0 (0)	Welterweight
FRA	Jean-François Lénogue	Jeff	0–1–0 (0)	Welterweight
FRA	Jérôme Le Banner	Geronimo	1*–0–0 (0)	Heavyweight
GBR	Alistair Overeem	The Demolition Man	7–7–0 (0)	Middleweight; Heavyweight
GBR	James Thompson	The Colossus	5–2–0 (0)	Heavyweight
GBR	Mark Weir	The Wizard	0–1–0 (0)	Welterweight
GBR	Matt Skelton		0–1–0 (0)	Heavyweight
GEO	Eldar Kurtanidze		0–1–0 (0)	Heavyweight
HRV	Branko Cikatić	The Croatian Tiger	0–2–0 (1*)	Heavyweight
HRV	Mirko Filipović	Cro Cop	18–4–2 (0)	Heavyweight
HRV	Zelg Galešić	Benkei	0–1–0 (0)	Welterweight
IDN	Aji Susilo		1–0–0 (0)	Lightweight
JPN	Akihiro Gono		6–3–0 (0)	Middleweight; Welterweight
JPN	Akira Shoji	Mr. Pride	9–12–2 (0)	Welterweight; Middleweight; Openweight
JPN	Alexander Otsuka		3–10–0 (0)	Middleweight; Welterweight; Openweight
JPN	Daijiro Matsui		5–7–2 (0)	Middleweight; Welterweight; Openweight
JPN	Daiju Takase		4–4–0 (0)	Welterweight; Openweight
JPN	Daisuke Nakamura		2–1–0 (0)	Lightweight; Welterweight
JPN	Daisuke Sugie	Amazon	0–1–0 (0)	Lightweight
JPN	Dokonjonosuke Mishima		2–2–0 (0)	Lightweight
JPN	Eiji Mitsuoka		2–2–1 (0)	Lightweight; Openweight
JPN	Hatsu Hioki		1–0–0 (0)	Lightweight
JPN	Hayato Sakurai	Mach	8–3–0 (0)	Lightweight; Welterweight
JPN	Hidehiko Yoshida		6–5–1 (0)	Middleweight; Heavyweight
JPN	Hiroki Kurosawa		0–1**–0 (0)	Middleweight
JPN	Hiromitsu Kanehara		0–3–0 (0)	Middleweight
JPN	Hirotaka Yokoi	Kaibutsu-kun	1–4–0 (0)	Heavyweight
JPN	Hiroyuki Abe		0–1–1 (0)	Lightweight
JPN	Ikuhisa Minowa	Minowaman	9–8–0 (0)	Welterweight; Middleweight; Openweight
JPN	Jukei Nakajima		1–0–0 (0)	Openweight
JPN	Jutaro Nakao		0–1–0 (0)	Lightweight
JPN	Katsuhisa Fujii		1–1–0 (0)	Heavyweight
JPN	Kazuhiro Hamanaka		1–1–0 (0)	Welterweight
JPN	Kazuhiro Nakamura		11–6–0 (0)	Middleweight; Heavyweight
JPN	Kazuki Okubo		1–1–0 (0)	Welterweight
JPN	Kazunari Murakami		1–1–0 (0)	Heavyweight
JPN	Kazuo Misaki		4–4–0 (0)	Welterweight
JPN	Kazuo Takahashi	Yoshiki Takahashi	0–3–0 (0)	Heavyweight; Middleweight
JPN	Kazushi Sakuraba	The Gracie Hunter	18–7–1 (0)	Middleweight; Welterweight; Openweight
JPN	Kazuyuki Fujita	Iron Head	7–4–1 (0)	Heavyweight
JPN	Kenichi Yamamoto		0–3–0 (0)	Middleweight; Welterweight
JPN	Kenji Arai		0–1–0 (0)	Lightweight
JPN	Ken Kaneko		0–1–0 (0)	Lightweight
JPN	Kiyoshi Tamura		5–4–0 (0)	Middleweight; Openweight
JPN	Kōji Kitao		1–0–0 (0)	Heavyweight
JPN	Kyosuke Sasaki		0–0–1 (0)	Lightweight
JPN	Makoto Takimoto		3–3–0 (0)	Welterweight; Middleweight; Openweight
JPN	Masaaki Satake		1–6–1 (0)	Heavyweight
JPN	Masakazu Imanari		0–2–0 (0)	Lightweight
JPN	Masanori Suda		0–1–0 (0)	Welterweight
JPN	Michihiro Omigawa		0–1–0 (0)	Lightweight
JPN	Michiyoshi Ohara		0–2–0 (0)	Heavyweight
JPN	Minoru Toyonaga		0–1–0 (0)	Middleweight
JPN	Naoki Matsushita		0–0–1 (0)	Lightweight
JPN	Naoki Sano		0–3–0 (0)	Heavyweight
JPN	Naoya Ogawa	O-chan	4–2–0 (0)	Heavyweight
JPN	Naoyuki Kotani		0–1–0 (0)	Lightweight
JPN	Nobuaki Kakuda		1**–0–0 (0)	Middleweight
JPN	Nobuhiko Takada		3–6–1 (0)	Heavyweight; Middleweight
JPN	Nobuhiro Obiya		0–2–0 (0)	Lightweight
JPN	Osamu Tachihikari		0–1–0 (0)	Heavyweight
JPN	Ryo Chonan	Piranha	4–4–0 (0)	Welterweight
JPN	Ryuichi Murata		0–1–0 (0)	Welterweight
JPN	Ryuki Ueyama		0–2–0 (0)	Welterweight
JPN	Ryuta Sakurai		0–3–0 (0)	Welterweight
JPN	Sanae Kikuta		3–1–1 (0)	Welterweight
JPN	Satoshi Honma		1–1–0 (0)	Openweight
JPN	Seichi Ikemoto		0–2–0 (0)	Lightweight
JPN	Shamoji Fujii		1–1–0 (0)	Heavyweight
JPN	Shinya Aoki		4–0–0 (0)	Lightweight
JPN	Shungo Oyama		1–5–0 (0)	Welterweight; Middleweight; Heavyweight
JPN	Soichi Nishida		0–2–0 (0)	Heavyweight
JPN	Sokun Koh		2–0–0 (0)	Middleweight
JPN	Tadao Yasuda		1–0–0 (0)	Heavyweight
JPN	Takahiro Oba		0–3–0 (0)	Middleweight; Welterweight
JPN	Takanori Gomi	The Fireball Kid	12–1–0 (1)	Lightweight
JPN	Takashi Sugiura		1–1–0 (0)	Heavyweight
JPN	Takayuki Okada	Giant Ochiai	3–1–0 (0)	Heavyweight
JPN	Tatsuya Iwasaki		0–1–0 (0)	Heavyweight
JPN	Tatsuya Kawajiri	Crusher	4–2–0 (0)	Lightweight
JPN	Tokimitsu Ishizawa	Kendo Kashin	1–1–0 (0)	Welterweight
JPN	Tomohiko Hashimoto		0–1–0 (0)	Heavyweight
JPN	Tomomi Iwama	Taisho	0–1–0 (0)	Lightweight
JPN	Tsuyoshi Kohsaka	TK	1–2–0 (0)	Heavyweight
JPN	Wataru Sakata		0–1–0 (0)	Middleweight
JPN	Yasuhito Namekawa		1–1–0 (0)	Middleweight
JPN	Yoshiaki Yatsu		0–2–0 (0)	Heavyweight
JPN	Yoshihiro Nakao	Kiss	2–1–0 (0)	Heavyweight
JPN	Yoshihiro Takayama		0–3–0 (0)	Heavyweight
JPN	Yoshihisa Yamamoto		3–6–0 (0)	Heavyweight
JPN	Yoshinori Sasaki	Mammoth	0–1–0 (0)	Heavyweight
JPN	Yoshiro Maeda		0–2–0 (0)	Lightweight
JPN	Yoji Anjo	Mr. 200%	0–1–0 (0)	Welterweight
JPN	Yōsuke Nishijima	Yōsukezan	0–2–0 (0)	Welterweight; Openweight
JPN	Yuji Hisamatsu	The Pink Typhoon	1–0–0 (0)	Welterweight
JPN	Yuki Ishikawa		0–1–0 (0)	Middleweight
JPN	Yuki Kondo		1–6–0 (0)	Middleweight; Welterweight; Openweight
JPN	Yuki Sasaki		0–1–0 (0)	Welterweight
JPN	Yukio Kawabe	Tamakairiki	0–1–0 (0)	Heavyweight
JPN	Yushin Okami	Thunder	2–0–0 (0)	Welterweight
JPN	Yusuke Imamura		2–3–0 (0)	Heavyweight
JPN	—	Raou	0–1–0 (0)	Middleweight
KOR	Choi Mu-Bae	The Heavy Tank of Busan	4–1–0 (0)	Heavyweight
KOR	Eoh Won Jin		0–1–0 (0)	Lightweight
KOR	Eun Soo Lee	Heavy Metal	0–1–0 (0)	Heavyweight
KOR	Han Ten Yun		0–1–0 (0)	Heavyweight
KOR	In Seok Kim		0–1–0 (0)	Lightweight
KOR	Joe Son		0–2–0 (0)	Heavyweight
KOR	Kim Jin Oh		0–1–0 (0)	Heavyweight
KOR	Kim Jong Wang		1–1–0 (0)	Heavyweight
KOR	Lee Tae-Hyun		0–1–0 (0)	Heavyweight
KOR	Yoon Dong-Sik		0–4–0 (0)	Middleweight; Welterweight
LTU	Egidijus Valavičius		0–1–0 (0)	Middleweight
LTU	Kęstutis Smirnovas		1–0–0 (0)	Middleweight
MEX	Alberto Del Rio	Dos Caras Jr.	0–2–0 (0)	Heavyweight
MEX	Olaf Alfonso		0–2–0 (0)	Lightweight
NLD	Bob Schrijber	Dirty Bob	0–3–0 (0)	Heavyweight
NLD	Brian Lo-A-Njoe		0–1–0 (0)	Lightweight
NLD	Ernesto Hoost	Mr. Perfect	0–0–1* (0)	Heavyweight
NLD	Gilbert Yvel	The Hurricane	2–7–0 (1)	Heavyweight
NLD	Hans Nijman		0–1–0 (0)	Heavyweight
NLD	Herman Renting		0–1–0 (0)	Heavyweight
NLD	Jerrel Venetiaan		1–1–0 (0)	Heavyweight
NLD	Rodney Glunder		0–1–0 (0)	Heavyweight
NLD	Semmy Schilt	Hightower; Semtex	4–3–1* (0)	Heavyweight
NLD	Valentijn Overeem	The Python	0–4–0 (0)	Heavyweight
NLD	William van Roosmalen		1*–0–0 (0)	Heavyweight
NLD	Willie Peeters		0–1–0 (0)	Heavyweight
NOR	John-Olav Einemo	The Viking	0–1–0 (0)	Heavyweight
NOR	Joachim Hansen	Hellboy	4–2–0 (0)	Lightweight
NZL	Jason Suttie	Psycho	0–1–0 (0)	Heavyweight
NZL	Mark Hunt	Super Samoan	5–3–0 (0)	Heavyweight
NZL	Rony Sefo	Slyman	0–1–0 (0)	Heavyweight
POL	Pawel Nastula		1–3–0 (0)	Heavyweight
ROU	Alexandru Lungu		0–1–0 (0)	Heavyweight
RUS	Achmed Labasanov		0–1–0 (0)	Heavyweight
RUS	Alexander Emelianenko	The Grim Reaper	6–2–0 (0)	Heavyweight
RUS	Andrei Kopylov		0–1–0 (0)	Heavyweight
RUS	Andrei Semenov	White Shark	0–1–0 (0)	Welterweight
RUS	Bazigit Atajev	Volk	0–1–0 (0)	Heavyweight
RUS	Denis Sobolev		0–1–0 (0)	Heavyweight
RUS	Fedor Emelianenko	The Last Emperor	14–0–0 (1)	Heavyweight
RUS	Ibragim Magomedov		0–1–0 (0)	Heavyweight
RUS	Iouri Kotchkine		0–1–0 (0)	Heavyweight
RUS	Mikhail Illoukhine		0–1–0 (0)	Middleweight
RUS	Murad Chunkaiev		0–1–0 (0)	Welterweight
RUS	Oleg Taktarov	The Russian Bear	0–1–0 (0)	Heavyweight
RUS	Roman Zentsov		2–1–0 (0)	Heavyweight
RUS	Sergei Kharitonov		8–3–0 (0)	Heavyweight
RUS	Sergey Ignatov		0–1–0 (0)	Middleweight
SUR	Lloyd van Dams	The Tornado	0–1–0 (0)	Heavyweight
SWE	David Bielkheden		0–1–0 (0)	Lightweight
TON	Tully Kulihaapai		0–1***–0 (0)	Heavyweight
TTO	Gary Goodridge	Big Daddy	9–9–0 (0)	Heavyweight
TUR	Fatih Kocamis	Turkish Terror	1–0–0 (0)	Middleweight
UKR	Igor Vovchanchyn	Ice Cold	18–8–0 (1)	Heavyweight; Middleweight
USA	Aaron Riley		1–0–0 (0)	Lightweight
USA	Alex Andrade	El Toro	0–1–0 (0)	Middleweight
USA	Alex Stiebling	The Brazilian Killa	2–2–0 (0)	Middleweight
USA	Amir Rahnavardi		0–2–0 (0)	Middleweight; Openweight
USA	Anthony Macias	Mad Dog	0–2–0 (0)	Welterweight
USA	Bobby Southworth		0–1–0 (0)	Middleweight
USA	Bob Sapp	The Beast	2–1–0 (0)	Heavyweight
USA	Brady Fink	Funky	0–1–0 (0)	Welterweight
USA	Carl Ognibene	Carl Malenko	1–2–0 (0)	Middleweight
USA	Charles Bennett	Krazy Horse	2–3–0 (0)	Lightweight
USA	Chris Brennan	The Westside Strangler	1–2–0 (0)	Lightweight
USA	Chuck Liddell	Iceman	2–1–0 (0)	Middleweight
USA	Clay French		0–1–0 (0)	Lightweight
USA	Cory Peterson	L.A. Giant	0–1–0 (0)	Heavyweight
USA	Dan Bobish	The Bull	0–3–0 (0)	Heavyweight
USA	Dan Henderson	Hendo	13–5–0 (0)	Welterweight; Middleweight; Heavyweight
USA	Dan Severn	The Beast	0–0–1 (0)	Heavyweight
USA	David Abbott	Tank Abbott	0–1–0 (0)	Heavyweight
USA	Dean Lister	The Machine	1–2–0 (0)	Middleweight; Welterweight
USA	Don Frye	The Predator	3–4–0 (0)	Heavyweight
USA	Egan Inoue		1–2–0 (0)	Middleweight
USA	Enson Inoue	Yamato Damashi	2–4–0 (0)	Heavyweight
USA	Emmanuel Yarborough		0–1–0 (0)	Heavyweight
USA	Eric Esch	Butterbean	2–1–0 (0)	Heavyweight
USA	Frank Trigg	Twinkle Toes	2–1–0 (0)	Welterweight
USA	Gan McGee	Giant	0–2–0 (0)	Heavyweight
USA	George Randolph		0–1*–0 (0)	Heavyweight
USA	Gilbert Melendez		2–0–0 (0)	Lightweight
USA	Guy Mezger		4–6–0 (0)	Middleweight
USA	Heath Herring	The Texas Crazy Horse	12–5–0 (0)	Heavyweight
USA	Henry Armstrong Miller	Sentoryū Henri	1–4–0 (0)	Heavyweight
USA	James Lee		1–0–0 (0)	Middleweight
USA	Jason Black		1–1–0 (0)	Lightweight
USA	Jeff Curran		0–1–0 (0)	Lightweight
USA	Jeff Monson	The Snowman	1–0–0 (0)	Heavyweight
USA	Jens Pulver	Lil' Evil	2–2–0 (0)	Lightweight
USA	Jeremy Horn		2–0–0 (0)	Middleweight
USA	Joe Pearson		1–0–0 (0)	Lightweight
USA	Joey Villaseñor	Dreamsmasher	0–2–0 (0)	Welterweight
USA	John Dixson	Big John	0–1–0 (0)	Heavyweight
USA	John Marsh		0–1–0 (0)	Heavyweight
USA	John Renken	The Saint	0–1–0 (0)	Middleweight
USA	Josh Barnett	Baby-faced Assassin	5–4–0 (0)	Heavyweight
USA	Josh Thomson		1–0–0 (0)	Lightweight
USA	Ken Shamrock	The World's Most Dangerous Man	1–3–0 (0)	Heavyweight
USA	Kevin Randleman	The Monster	4–7–0 (0)	Heavyweight; Middleweight
USA	Kimo Leopoldo		0–1–1 (0)	Heavyweight
USA	Kyle Sturgeon		0–1–0 (0)	Heavyweight
USA	Larry Parker		0–1–0 (0)	Openweight
USA	Mac Danzig		0–1–0 (0)	Lightweight
USA	Mark Coleman	The Hammer	8–5–0 (0)	Heavyweight; Middleweight
USA	Mark Kerr	The Titan	6–4–0 (1)	Heavyweight
USA	Maurice Smith	Mo	1–0–0 (0)	Heavyweight
USA	Mike Barton		0–1–0 (0)	Openweight
USA	Mike Bencić	Batman	0–2–0 (0)	Heavyweight
USA	Mike Bourke	The Rhino	0–1–0 (0)	Heavyweight
USA	Mike Russow		0–1–0 (0)	Heavyweight
USA	Nick Diaz		0–0–0 (1)	Lightweight
USA	Paul Rodriguez		0–1–0 (0)	Lightweight
USA	Phil Baroni		4–2–0 (0)	Welterweight
USA	Quinton Jackson	Rampage	12–5–0 (0)	Middleweight
USA	Ralph White		0–1*–0 (1*)	Heavyweight
USA	Ricco Rodriguez	Suave	3–1–0 (0)	Heavyweight
USA	Robbie Lawler	Ruthless	1–0–0 (0)	Welterweight
USA	Ron Waterman	H2O	2–1–0 (0)	Heavyweight
USA	Rory Singer	Version 2.5	0–1–0 (0)	Welterweight
USA	Rulon Gardner		1–0–0 (0)	Heavyweight
USA	Scott Bills		0–1–0 (0)	Lightweight
USA	Sean O'Haire		0–1–0 (0)	Heavyweight
USA	Sean Sherk	The Muscle Shark	1–0–0 (0)	Welterweight
USA	Shannon Ritch	The Cannon	0–2–0 (0)	Welterweight
USA	Steve White		0–1–0 (0)	Welterweight
USA	Tim Catalfo	Obake	0–1–0 (0)	Heavyweight
USA	Tom Erikson	The Big Cat	3–2–0 (0)	Heavyweight
USA	Tra Telligman	Trauma	1–1–0 (0)	Heavyweight
USA	Travis Wiuff	Diesel	0–1–0 (0)	Middleweight
USA	Vernon White	Tiger	0–2–0 (0)	Middleweight
ZAF	Jadyson Costa		0–1–0 (0)	Lightweight
ZAF	Jan Nortje	The Giant	0–1–0 (0)	Heavyweight

* Kickboxing match.	** Kyokushin Karate match.	*** Grappling match against Enson Inoue.

== See also ==
- Pride Fighting Championships
- Mixed martial arts
- List of Pride events
- List of Pride champions
- List of male mixed martial artists
