= Kęstas =

Kęstas is a Lithuanian given name. It may be a given name in itself, as well as a diminutive of the given name Kęstutis. Notable people with the name include:

- Kęstas Miškinis, Lithuanian sports scientist and educator
- Kęstas Komskis (born 1963), Lithuanian politician, mayor of Pagėgiai
