= Grinius =

- Lithuanian surname
- m.: Grinius
- f.: (unmarried): Griniūtė
- f.: (married): Grinienė/Griniuvienė
- Related names: ru:Гринь (Grin')

Grinius is a Lithuanian language family name. It may refer to:

- Kazys Grinius, 3rd President of Lithuania
- Kęstutis Grinius, Lithuanian politician
- Marius Grinius, Canadian diplomat
