= Masutatsu Yano =

Japanese mixed martial arts fighter

- Born: July 11, 1975 (age 51); Japan
- Nationality: Japanese
- Height: 5 ft 9 in (1.75 m)
- Weight: 198 lb (90 kg; 14 st 2 lb)
- Division: Heavyweight; Light heavyweight
- Fighting out of: Tokyo, Japan
- Team: RJW Central
- Years active: 1999–2004

Mixed martial arts record
- Total: 7
- Wins: 2
- By decision: 2
- Losses: 4
- By knockout: 2
- By submission: 1
- By decision: 1
- Draws: 1

Other information
- Mixed martial arts record from Sherdog

Masutatsu Yano (born July 11, 1975) is a Japanese former mixed martial artist who competed for the Ultimate Fighting Championship, RINGS, Pancrase and Deep.

== Mixed martial arts career ==
=== Ultimate Fighting Championship ===
Yano made his professional mixed martial arts debut and sole UFC appearance against Katsuhisa Fujii on November 19, 1999, at UFC 23. He lost the fight via TKO due to punches in the second round.

=== Pancrase ===
Yano made his Pancrase debut against Daisuke Ishii on January 23, 2000, at Pancrase: Trans 1. He lost the fight via KO due to punches in the first round.

Yano then faced Kazuo Takahashi on August 27, 2000, at Pancrase: 2000 Neo-Blood Tournament Second Round. He lost the fight via unanimous decision.

=== Fighting Network Rings ===
Yano made his RINGS debut against Yasuhito Namekawa on June 15, 2001, at Rings: World Title Series 2. He lost the fight via a guillotine choke submission in the second round.

Yano then faced Hiroyuki Ito on February 15, 2002, at Rings: World Title Series Grand Final. He won the fight via majority decision thus breaking a four-fight losing streak and earning his first mixed martial arts victory.

=== Later career ===
Yano faced Masato Nishiguchi on July 21, 2003, at GCM: Demolition 030721. He won the fight via unanimous decision.

Yano made his final mixed martial arts bout against Takahiro Oba on January 22, 2004, at Deep: 13th Impact. The fight ended in a draw.

== Submission grappling career ==
Yano competed in the 88 kg category at ADCC 2001 wherein he faced Dean Lister. He lost via a rear naked choke submission.

Additionally, Yano lost to Saulo Ribeiro in the Absolute category at ADCC 2001.

== Mixed martial arts record ==
Professional record breakdown
| 7 matches | 2 wins | 4 losses |
| By knockout | 0 | 2 |
| By submission | 0 | 1 |
| By decision | 2 | 1 |
| Draws | 1 | |

| Res. | Record | Opponent | Method | Event | Date | Round | Time | Location | Notes |
|---|---|---|---|---|---|---|---|---|---|
| Draw | 2–4–1 | Takahiro Oba | Decision (majority) | Deep: 13th Impact | January 22, 2004 | 2 | 5:00 | Tokyo, Japan | |
| Win | 2–4 | Masato Nishiguchi | Decision (unanimous) | GCM: Demolition 030721 | July 21, 2003 | 2 | 5:00 | Yokohama, Japan | |
| Win | 1–4 | Hiroyuki Ito | Decision (majority) | Rings: World Title Series Grand Final | February 15, 2002 | 3 | 5:00 | Kanagawa, Japan | |
| Loss | 0–4 | Yasuhito Namekawa | Submission (guillotine choke) | Rings: World Title Series 2 | June 15, 2001 | 2 | 0:22 | Kanagawa, Japan | |
| Loss | 0–3 | Kazuo Takahashi | Decision (unanimous) | Pancrase: 2000 Neo-Blood Tournament Second Round | August 27, 2000 | 1 | 10:00 | Osaka, Japan | |
| Loss | 0–2 | Daisuke Ishii | KO (punches) | Pancrase: Trans 1 | January 23, 2000 | 1 | 0:06 | Tokyo, Japan | |
| Loss | 0–1 | Katsuhisa Fujii | TKO (punches) | UFC 23 | November 19, 1999 | 2 | 3:12 | Urayasu, Chiba, Japan | |

== See also ==
- List of male mixed martial artists
