= UFC 23 =

UFC mixed martial arts event in 1999

UFC 23: Ultimate Japan 2
- The poster for UFC 23: Ultimate Japan 2
- Promotion: Ultimate Fighting Championship
- Date: November 19, 1999
- Venue: Tokyo Bay NK Hall
- City: Tokyo, Japan

Event chronology
UFC 22: Only One Can Be Champion	UFC 23: Ultimate Japan 2	UFC 24: First Defense

UFC 23: Ultimate Japan 2 was a mixed martial arts event held by the Ultimate Fighting Championship on November 19, 1999 at Tokyo Bay NK Hall in Tokyo, Japan.

UFC 23 was the last UFC event to feature a one-night tournament, marking the end of the tournament format that had characterized many of the promotion's early events.

== History ==
UFC 23 was the second UFC event to take place in Tokyo, Japan, where the newly formed PRIDE Fighting Championships were enjoying massive success. UFC 23 was headlined by a Heavyweight Championship Title bout between Kevin Randleman and Pete Williams, held to determine the champion after Bas Rutten's retirement.

The event also featured a four-man "Japanese" tournament, held to crown the first ever UFC Japan Champion. The tournament was the first in the UFC since UFC 17, and the last one-night tournament held by the UFC (subsequent multiple-night tournaments have since taken place in 2003 at UFC 39 and UFC 41, and in 2012 at UFC on FX 2, UFC on FX 3, and UFC 152). SEG originally intended UFC Japan to be a separate company, run by local promoters, but due to mounting financial problems, a lack of cooperation from Japanese promoters, and the rise of the popular PRIDE and K-1 organizations, the idea was scrapped following UFC 25: Ultimate Japan 3.

UFC 23 was the first UFC event to not see a home video release, as SEG was nearing bankruptcy and struggling to keep the UFC alive through extremely limited pay per view in the US, as well as minor coverage in Brazil and Japan. UFC 23 has now been released as part of a DVD collection (UFC 21–30). It was also the first to feature James Werme who handled backstage interviews.

Bas Rutten announced at UFC 23 that he dropped his heavyweight championship title so he could drop down to middleweight to bring Frank Shamrock out of retirement to fight for the middleweight championship.

== Results ==
Main Card
Weight class				Method	Round	Time	Notes
Heavyweight	Kevin Randleman	def.	Pete Williams	Decision (unanimous)	5	5:00	(Note: For the vacant UFC Heavyweight Championship.)
Heavyweight	Pedro Rizzo	def.	Tsuyoshi Kosaka	TKO (referee stoppage due to strikes)	3	1:12
Middleweight	Joe Slick	def.	Jason DeLucia	TKO (verbal submission due to knee injury)	1	1:12
Middleweight	Eugene Jackson	def.	Keiichiro Yamamiya	KO (punch)	3	3:12
UFC Japan Middleweight Tournament Finals
Middleweight	Kenichi Yamamoto	def.	Katsuhisa Fujii	Submission (kneebar)	1	4:15
UFC Japan Middleweight Tournament Semifinals
Middleweight	Katsuhisa Fujii	def.	Masutatsu Yano	TKO (referee stoppage due to strikes)	2	3:12
Middleweight	Kenichi Yamamoto	def.	Daiju Takase	Decision (unanimous)	3	5:00

== UFC Japan Tournament ==
Semifinals
Katsuhisa Fujii	TKO
Masutatsu Yano	2
Kenichi Yamamoto	DEC
Daiju Takase	3

Finals
Katsuhisa Fujii	1
Kenichi Yamamoto	SUB

== Encyclopedia awards ==
The following fighters were honored in the October 2011 book titled UFC Encyclopedia.

- Fight of the Night: Eugene Jackson vs. Keiichiro Yamamiya
- Knockout of the Night: Pedro Rizzo def. Tsuyoshi Kosaka

== See also ==
- Ultimate Fighting Championship
- List of UFC champions
- List of UFC events
- 1999 in UFC
