= 2002 in Fighting Network Rings =

Mixed martial arts events

Information
- First date: February 15, 2002
- Last date: December 14, 2002

Events
- Total events: 7

Fights
- Total fights: 65

Chronology
2001 in RINGS	2002 in Fighting Network Rings	2003 in RINGS

The year 2002 is the eighth year in the history of Fighting Network Rings, a mixed martial arts promotion based in Japan. In 2002 Fighting Network Rings held 7 events beginning with, Rings: World Title Series Grand Final.

== Events list ==
#	Event title	Date	Arena	Location
77	Rings Lithuania: Bushido Rings 6: Dynamite	December 14, 2002		Kaunas, Lithuania
76	Rings Holland: One Moment In Time	December 1, 2002	Vechtsebanen Sport Hall	Utrecht, Netherlands
75	Rings Lithuania: Bushido Rings 5: Shock	November 9, 2002	Vilnius Palace of Concerts and Sports	Vilnius, Lithuania
74	Rings Lithuania: Rampage	August 2, 2002		Palanga Beach Palanga, Lithuania
73	Rings Holland: Saved by the Bell	June 2, 2002	Sport Hall Zuid	Amsterdam, North Holland, Netherlands
72	Rings Lithuania: Bushido Rings 4	May 4, 2002	Kaunas Sport Hall	Kaunas, Lithuania
71	Rings: World Title Series Grand Final	February 15, 2002	Yokohama Cultural Gymnasium	Kanagawa, Japan

== Rings: World Title Series Grand Final ==
Rings: World Title Series Grand Final was an event held on February 15, 2002 at The Yokohama Cultural Gymnasium in Kanagawa, Japan.

=== Results ===
Main Card
Weight class				Method	Round	Time	Notes
	Fedor Emelianenko	def.	Chris Haseman	TKO (Punches)	1	2:50
	Hiromitsu Kanehara	vs.	Mikhail Ilyukhin	Draw	3	5:00
	Sam Nest	def.	Yasuhito Namekawa	Submission (Rear-Naked Choke)	2	4:53
	Hirotaka Yokoi	def.	Katsuhisa Fujii	Decision (Unanimous)	3	5:00
	Masutatsu Yano	def.	Hiroyuki Ito	Decision (Majority)	3	5:00
	Naoyuki Kotani	def.	Yoshinobu Ota	Technical Submission (Rear-Naked Choke)	1	1:41
	Takumi Yano	def.	Hidehiko Matsumoto	Decision (Lost Points)	3	5:00

== Rings Lithuania: Bushido Rings 4 ==
Rings: World Title Series 5 was an event held on May 4, 2002 at The Kaunas Sport Hall in Kaunas, Lithuania.

=== Results ===
Main Card
Weight class				Method	Round	Time	Notes
	Kestutis Smirnovas	def.	Pavel Dolgov	Decision	2	5:00
	Mindaugas Kulikauskas	vs.	Roman Sukoterin	Draw	3	5:00
	Vygandas Grazhys	def.	Petras Markevicius	Decision	3	5:00
	Mindaugas Smirnovas	def.	Alexey Saninkov	Decision (Unanimous)	2	5:00
	Regimantas Bakas	def.	Gela Getsadze	Submission (Armbar)	1	4:28
	Darius Jonyla	def.	Valdas Stankevicius	TKO	2	1:23
	Aurimas Motejunas	def.	Kestutis Salkauskas	KO	1	4:33
	Valdas Pocevicius	def.	Valerij Matvejev	Submission (Rear Naked Choke)	1	2:34
	Rimantas Pukas	def.	Remigijus Ziausys	Decision	3	5:00

== Rings Holland: Saved by the Bell ==
Rings Holland: Saved by the Bell was an event held on June 2, 2002 at The Sport Hall Zuid in Amsterdam, North Holland, Netherlands.

=== Results ===
Main Card
Weight class				Method	Round	Time	Notes
	Rodney Glunder	def.	Cheick Kongo	Decision (Unanimous)	2	5:00
	Gilbert Ballantine	def.	Ronny Rivano	KO (Punch)	2	1:20
	Dave Vader	def.	Sander MacKilljan	Submission (Keylock)	2	4:02
	Melvin Manhoef	def.	Paul Cahoon	TKO (Corner Stoppage)	2	2:07
	Brian Maulany	def.	Issam el Driny	TKO (Corner Stoppage)	1	3:18
	Hans Roovers	def.	Hans Vos	KO (Punch)	1	1:53
	Michael Knaap	def.	Patrick de Witte	KO (Flying Knee)	1	3:23
	Ijsbrand Schaap	def.	Chico Martinez	Submission (Guillotine Choke)	1	3:38
	Samir Bourekba	def.	Rob van Leeuwen	KO (Knee)	2	3:02
	Marc van Rooyen	def.	Melvin Geutskens	Submission (Forearm Choke)	2	2:11

== Rings Lithuania: Rampage ==
Rings Lithuania: Rampage was an event held on August 2, 2002 in Palanga Beach Palanga, Lithuania.

=== Results ===
Main Card
Weight class				Method	Round	Time	Notes
	Regimantas Bakas	def.	Edvardas Kulbekinas	N/A	0	0:00
	Rimantas Pukas	def.	Remigijus Ziausys	Decision (Points)	0	0:00
	Grazhuydas Smailis	def.	Linas Narkevicius	Submission	0	0:00
	Jordanas Poskaitis	def.	Marius Vaitkus	Submission	0	0:00
	Mindaugas Smirnovas	vs.	Oleg Menshov	Draw	0	0:00
	Arunas Nenartas	def.	Egidijus Petrushkevicius	KO	0	0:00
	Valdas Pocevicius	def.	Andrius Krishtopaitis	Decision (Points)	0	0:00

== Rings Lithuania: Bushido Rings 5: Shock ==
Rings Lithuania: Bushido Rings 5: Shock was an event held on November 9, 2002 at The Vilnius Palace of Concerts and Sports in Vilnius, Lithuania.

=== Results ===
Main Card
Weight class				Method	Round	Time	Notes
	Rokas Stambrauskas	def.	Ameran Bitsadze	KO	1	5:00
	Bazigit Atajev	def.	Kestutis Arbocius	Submission (Guillotine Choke)	2	2:58
	Egidijus Valavicius	def.	Krzysztof Gerke	TKO	1	5:00
	Takayuki Okochi	def.	Mindaugas Smirnovas	Submission (Triangle Choke)	1	3:22
	Jordanas Poskaitis	def.	Jessy Santini	Submission (Armbar)	5	0:17
	Kestutis Smirnovas	def.	Vladimir Smantster	Submission (Armbar)	1	0:00
	Mindaugas Kulikauskas	def.	Yuriy Kochkine	TKO	1	2:46
	Valentin Golubovskij	def.	Aleksandr Gergert	Submission (Armbar)	1	3:07
	Tadeush Cholodinskij	def.	Vygandas Grazhys	TKO	1	4:40
	Valdas Pocevicius	def.	Andrius Krishtopaitis	Decision	0	5:00

== Rings Holland: One Moment In Time ==
Rings Holland: One Moment In Time was an event held on December 1, 2002 at The Vechtsebanen Sport Hall in Utrecht, Netherlands.

=== Results ===
Main Card
Weight class				Method	Round	Time	Notes
	Rodney Glunder	def.	Tommy Sauer	TKO (Doctor Stoppage)	2	3:52
	Joop Kasteel	def.	Dave Vader	Submission (Scarf Hold)	1	4:07
	Robbie Nelson	def.	Ronny Rivano	KO (Punch)	1	3:01
	Sahin Yakut	def.	Gilbert Ballantine	TKO (Doctor Stoppage)	1	0:51
	Marco Mulder	def.	Bayram Tanner	TKO (Punches)	2	3:03
	Andre Tete	def.	Dave Dalgliesh	TKO (Retirement)	2	2:50
	Milco Voorn	def.	Hans Roovers	TKO (Exhaustion)	2	1:17
	Evert Fyeet	def.	Brian Maulany	Decision (Unanimous)	2	5:00
	Chico Martinez	def.	Anil Dubar	Decision (Unanimous)	3	5:00
	Michael Knaap	def.	Nathan Schouteren	TKO (Kick to the Body)	2	0:50
	Stefan Klever	def.	Vincent Striesenau	KO (Punch)	1	0:09

== Rings Lithuania: Bushido Rings 6: Dynamite ==
Rings Lithuania: Bushido Rings 6: Dynamite was an event held on December 14, 2002 in Kaunas, Lithuania.

=== Results ===
Main Card
Weight class				Method	Round	Time	Notes
	Mindaugas Kulikauskas	def.	Rokas Stambrauskas	KO	0	0:00
	Kestutis Arbocius	def.	Pavel Dolgov	KO	0	0:00
	Kestutis Smirnovas	def.	Darius Jonyla	Submission (Armbar)	0	0:00
	Jordanas Poskaitis	def.	Mariusz Ligizynski	Submission (Armbar)	0	0:00
	Vidmantas Tatarunas	def.	Rimas Vyshniauskas	Decision (Points)	0	0:00
	Tadeush Cholodinskij	def.	Saulius Seskevicius	KO	0	0:00
	Petras Markevicius	def.	Alexandr Pavluchenko	Submission (Armbar)	0	0:00
	Valentin Siouljine	def.	Valdas Pocevicius	Decision (Points)	0	0:00
	Regimantas Bakas	def.	Linas Narkevicius	Submission (Armbar)	0	0:00
	Rolandas Stember	vs.	Rimantas Pukas	Draw	0	0:00
	Vladimir Yushko	vs.	Andrius Krishtopaitis	No Contest (Leg Injury)	1	0:00

== See also ==
- Fighting Network Rings
- List of Fighting Network Rings events
