= Katsuhisa Fujii =

Japanese professional wrestler and MMA fighter

- Born: August 15, 1972 (age 54); Fukuyama, Hiroshima, Japan
- Other names: Shamoji ("Gamecock")
- Nationality: Japanese
- Height: 6 ft 0 in (1.83 m)
- Weight: 217 lb (98 kg; 15.5 st)
- Division: Heavyweight; Light Heavyweight
- Fighting out of: Hiroshima, Japan
- Team: Core

Mixed martial arts record
- Total: 28
- Wins: 9
- By knockout: 3
- By submission: 3
- By decision: 3
- Losses: 18
- By knockout: 7
- By submission: 6
- By decision: 5
- Draws: 1

Other information
- Mixed martial arts record from Sherdog

Katsuhisa Fujii (藤井 克久, Fujii Katsuhisa; born August 15, 1972), also known under the ring name Shamoji Fujii (藤井軍鶏侍, Fujii Shamoji) is a Japanese retired mixed martial artist and professional wrestler, mostly known for his work in Pro Wrestling Zero1 and Hustle.

A professional MMA competitor from 1996 until 2010, he competed for the UFC, Pride Fighting Championships, Pancrase, Deep, Fighting Network Rings, and M-1 Global.

== Mixed martial arts career ==
After a career of judo and amateur wrestling at the Tokyo University, Fujii learned mixed martial arts on the Super Tiger Gym of Satoru Sayama and debuted for Shooto in 1997.

=== Ultimate Fighting Championship ===
Fujii made his debut in Ultimate Fighting Championship during the UFC 23 tournament in Japan, where he first faced the newcomer Masutatsu Yano. The bout started slow, with Fujii defending with strikes and submissions attempts against his opponent's wrestling acumen, but in the second round, Fujii stunned Yano with punches and scored the knockout victory.

He advanced to the next round and found himself against fellow shoot-style practitioner Kenichi Yamamoto, a former apprentice of both Nobuhiko Takada and Akira Maeda. The heavier Fujii controlled the takedowns and applied ground and pound through the guard, threatening with a leglock attempt at the end of the round. At the second, Yamamoto pulled guard and Fujii repeated his strategy, but this time Yamamoto caught Fujii with a kneebar from the bottom, making him tap out.

=== Pride Fighting Championships ===
After joining Naoya Ogawa's team in Universal Fighting-Arts Organization, Fujii got to debut in Pride Fighting Championships in May 2004. His first bout was against Korean newcomer Jin O Kim, whom Fujii dominated with knees and punches before submitting him to a rear naked choke.

Fujii then was pitted against the returning Igor Vovchanchyn, former runner-up to the Pride Openweight Grand Prix 2000. Immediately overpowered by Vovchanchyn, the Japanese tried to avoid his striking, which gained him a red card. Minutes later, Vovchanchyn dropped Fujii and finished him with soccer kicks.

== Professional wrestling career ==
=== Pro Wrestling Zero-One (2003–2004) ===
He was introduced in Pro Wrestling Zero-One in January 2003 as a new ally to his mentor Ogawa. Immediately after, Fujii and him challenged the reigning NWA Intercontinental Tag Team Champions, Matt Ghaffari and Tom Howard, but were defeated. Fujii remained as a Japanese loyalist, teaming up with native wrestlers against Ghaffari and his American faction from UPW, while also doing small appearances for shoot-style wrestling promotion U-Style, founded by Kiyoshi Tamura.

Ogawa and him teamed up again in July, when they competed at the OH Tag Festival. They were successful, reaching the finals after eliminating Howard and Ghaffari's own teams, as well as Mexican legends Dos Caras Jr. and Lizmark Jr., and then defeated Kevin Randleman and The Predator at the finals to win the tournament. Fujii also followed this victory by winning also the U-Style tournament Kiyoshi Tamura Challenger, earning him a match against Tamura which Katsuhisa lost. Ogawa and him kept teaming until the end of the year, when they both left Zero-One for Hustle.

=== Hustle (2004–2006) ===
Fujii wrestled in Hustle as a member of Ogawa's Hustle Army. Being given the nickname of "Shamoji" ("Gamecock") by Ogawa, Fujii was portrayed here as an optimistic underdog who always tried his best despite constantly failing. It was better exemplified by his finishing move, a diving elbow drop ironically baptized as AHE or Atareba Hyappatsuhyakuchu Elbow (translated as "100% Hitting Chance Elbow"), which he constantly boasted of, yet never managed to land on his opponent due to the long range he chose to execute it. He battled repeatedly the forces of Generalissimo Takada's Monster Army over the years, getting occasional wins in tag team matches, until leaving Hustle in March 2006.

== Championships and accomplishments ==
- Pancrase Hybrid Wrestling
  - 2000 Pancrase Heavyweight Championship Tournament Runner-up
- Ultimate Fighting Championship
  - UFC 23 Heavyweight Tournament Runner-up
- U-Style
  - Kiyoshi Tamura Challenger Tournament (2003)

== Mixed martial arts record ==
Professional record breakdown
28 matches	9 wins	18 losses
By knockout	3	7
By submission	3	6
By decision	3	5
Draws	1	

Res.	Record	Opponent	Method	Event	Date	Round	Time	Location	Notes
Loss	9–18–1	Ryuta Noji	TKO (punches)	DEEP: 46 Impact	February 28, 2010	1	3:18	Tokyo, Japan	Light Heavyweight bout.
Loss	9–17–1	Choi Mu-Bae	Decision (unanimous)	Pancrase: Changing Tour 3	June 7, 2009	2	5:00	Tokyo, Japan	
Loss	9–16–1	Lee Sang-Soo	TKO (punches)	DEEP: Gladiator	August 16, 2008	1	4:36	Okayama, Japan	
Loss	9–15–1	Jessie Gibbs	TKO (knees and punches)	M-1 Challenge 5: Japan	July 17, 2008	1	1:34	Tokyo, Japan	
Loss	9–14–1	Akhmet Sultanov	Submission (armbar)	M-1 Challenge 2: Russia	April 3, 2008	1	0:54	St. Petersburg, Russia	
Loss	9–13–1	Yasuhito Namekawa	Decision (majority)	DEEP: 32 Impact	October 10, 2007	2	5:00	Tokyo, Japan	Light Heavyweight bout.
Win	9–12–1	Yuji Sakuragi	Decision (majority)	DEEP: Glove	July 26, 2007	2	5:00	Tokyo, Japan	
Loss	8–12–1	Jyunpei Hamada	Decision (split)	MARS 6: Rapid Fire	December 22, 2006	2	5:00	Yokohama, Japan	95 kg (209.4 lbs) bout.
Loss	8–11–1	Elvis Sinosic	Submission (armbar)	X-plosion: X-plosion	August 18, 2006	1	N/A	Australia	
Loss	8–10–1	Igor Vovchanchyn	KO (punches)	PRIDE Bushido 5	October 14, 2004	1	4:02	Osaka, Japan	
Win	8–9–1	Jin O Kim	Submission (rear-naked choke)	PRIDE Bushido 3	May 23, 2004	1	2:58	Yokohama, Japan	
Win	7–9–1	Hiroya Takada	Decision (majority)	Pancrase: 2002 Anniversary Show	September 29, 2002	3	5:00	Yokohama, Japan	
Loss	6–9–1	Mikhail Ilyukhin	Submission (guillotine choke)	PC: Premium Challenge	May 6, 2002	1	5:45	Tokyo, Japan	
Win	6–8–1	Mike Thomas	Submission (kneebar)	TF: Tropical Fights 3	February 19, 2002	1	N/A	Tahiti	
Loss	5–8–1	Hirotaka Yokoi	Decision (unanimous)	RINGS: World Title Series Grand Final	February 15, 2002	3	5:00	Yokohama, Japan	
Loss	5–7–1	Kazuo Takahashi	TKO (punches)	Pancrase: Proof 7	December 1, 2001	1	1:12	Yokohama, Japan	
Win	5–6–1	Osami Shibuya	Decision (unanimous)	Pancrase: 2001 Anniversary Show	September 30, 2001	3	5:00	Kanagawa, Japan	
Win	4–6–1	Jason DeLucia	TKO (knee injury)	Pancrase: 2001 Anniversary Show	September 30, 2001	1	5:00	Kanagawa, Japan	
Loss	3–6–1	Antônio Rogério Nogueira	Technical Submission (armbar)	DEEP: 2nd Impact	August 18, 2001	1	3:59	Yokohama, Japan	
Loss	3–5–1	Marcelo Tigre	Submission (rear-naked choke)	DEEP: 1st Impact	January 8, 2001	2	2:27	Nagoya, Japan	
Draw	3–4–1	Jason DeLucia	Draw	Pancrase: Trans 7	December 4, 2000	1	15:00	Tokyo, Japan	
Win	3–4	Johnny Huskey	Submission (keylock)	Pancrase: Trans 6	October 31, 2000	1	1:40	Tokyo, Japan	
Loss	2–4	Kenichi Yamamoto	Submission (kneebar)	UFC 23	November 19, 1999	1	4:15	Tokyo, Japan	
Win	2–3	Masutatsu Yano	TKO (punches)	UFC 23	November 19, 1999	2	3:12	Tokyo, Japan	
Loss	1–3	Kohei Sato	TKO (punches)	Shooto: Renaxis 2	July 16, 1999	1	4:05	Tokyo, Japan	
Win	1–2	Daniel Quonian	TKO (punches)	Shooto: Reconquista 2	April 6, 1997	1	0:44	Tokyo, Japan	Heavyweight debut.
Loss	0–2	David Paaluhi	TKO (punches)	SB 2: SuperBrawl 2	October 11, 1996	1	0:55	Honolulu, Hawaii, United States	For SuperBrawl Middleweight (80 kg) Tournament Championship.
Loss	0–1	Ryuta Sakurai	Decision	Lumax Cup: Tournament of J '96	March 30, 1996	2	3:00	Japan	
