= Hirotaka Yokoi =

Japanese professional wrestler and mixed martial arts fighter

- Born: June 8, 1978 (age 48); Iwamizawa, Hokkaido, Japan
- Other names: Kaibutsu-kun ("Monster-kun")
- Nationality: Japanese
- Height: 5 ft 11 in (1.80 m)
- Weight: 205 lb (93 kg; 14.6 st)
- Division: Heavyweight; Light Heavyweight
- Style: MMA; Shooto
- Fighting out of: Osaka, Japan
- Team: RINGS Japan / Alliance Team
- Teacher: Tsuyoshi Kohsaka
- Years active: 2000–2007

Mixed martial arts record
- Total: 16
- Wins: 11
- By knockout: 2
- By submission: 5
- By decision: 4
- Losses: 5
- By knockout: 4
- By submission: 1

Other information
- Mixed martial arts record from Sherdog

Hirotaka Yokoi (横井宏考) (born June 8, 1978) is a Japanese former mixed martial artist and professional wrestler. A professional MMA competitor from 2000 until 2007, Yokoi fought for PRIDE, Shooto, RINGS, and DEEP, while in professional wrestling he wrestled mainly for Pro Wrestling Zero1.

== Mixed martial arts career ==
Yokoi originally started training in Judo in high school, but he was more interested in Universal Wrestling Federation and its offshoots. He participated at a Shooto mixed martial arts tournament during his stay at the Kinki University, and later moved to Fighting Network RINGS. Yokoi gained the nickname "Kaibutsu-kun" (meaning "Monster-kun") for his physical resemblance to the title character from the 1980s anime series Kaibutsu-kun.

=== Fighting Network RINGS ===
Yokoi made his professional debut in 2000 and won his first eight fights, mostly fighting in the RINGS organization before moving to compete in PRIDE. After RINGS's demise, he followed fellow judoka Tsuyoshi Kohsaka and joined his Alliance team.

=== PRIDE Fighting Championships ===
Yokoi made his debut for the organization on November 24, 2002 at Pride 23 against Dutch kickboxer Jerrel Venetiaan, winning in the second round via armbar submission.

After picking up a TKO win over Wilson Gouveia, the undefeated Yokoi fought former Pride Heavyweight Champion Antônio Rodrigo Nogueira in the opening round of the Pride Total Elimination 2004 tournament. Yokoi performed unexpectedly well, taking Nogueira down repeatedly with judo throws and pulling out reversals and occasional ground and pound on the Brazilian jiu-jitsu expert, but he ultimately fell to an anaconda choke in the second round for the first loss of his career.

At PRIDE 28, Yokoi faced Heath Herring, but he was soon overwhelmed with a right hook and multiple knees, including illegal strikes to the back to the head that granted Herring a warning. He eventually lost the fight by TKO in the same way. Yokoi looked to make up for his defeat at the next event by taking on Mario Sperry, Brazilian jiu-jitsu world champion and Nogueira's trainer, but after an uneventful round of clinch striking Yokoi was again downed and hit with knees and soccer kicks for the TKO.

Yokoi's final fight in PRIDE was at PRIDE 30, where he faced Quinton "Rampage" Jackson. Yokoi showed himself active again, gaining dominant position with an early omoplata sweep, but Jackson used his superior strength to reverse him and threw heavy punches and kicks until the referee stopped the match.

=== Post-PRIDE ===
Yokoi bounced back with a win via rear-naked choke submission win a year after last fight and then fought again a year later in Finland, losing via TKO. With a career record of 11-5, having won only one of his last six fights, Yokoi retired.

== Professional wrestling career ==
=== Pro Wrestling Zero1 (2002–2007) ===
Yokoi joined Pro Wrestling Zero1 in May 2002. He started teaming up with other shoot-style wrestlers, namely Wataru Sakata, Yuki Ishikawa and Yoshiaki Fujiwara, and also enjoyed significant wins in the Fire Festival, beating Kohei Sato and Tetsuhiro Kuroda. He spent the rest of the year in random tag team matches, as well as losing efforts to Shinjiro Otani and Kazuhiko Ogasawara. Eventually, he formed a tag team with Kohei Sato in midst of the feud between the native wrestlers and Steve Corino's American faction, and they challenged Corino and CW Anderson for the NWA Intercontinental Tag Team Championship in two separate occasions, though coming short in both.

Around the same time, in which their team was named as Rowdy, they started appearing in All Japan Pro Wrestling as Zero-One representatives. Sato and Yokoi put their eyes in the All Asia Tag Team Championship, taking part in a special league for the vacated title. Rowdy was successful, winning the belts against Turmeric Storm (Kazushi Miyamoto and Tomoaki Honma) in July 2003. They retained the title against challengers like King Adamo and King Joe and Nobukazu Hirai and Shigeo Okumura, but ended up losing it in October to the Zero-One team of Kintaro Kanemura and Tetsuhiro Kuroda.

After the All Japan affair, Yokoi diversified to his singles career aside from Rowdy, and challenged The Predator for the Zero-One United States Heavyweight Championship and Masato Tanaka for the NWA United National Heavyweight Championship. He and Sato also challenged for the NWA tag team titles several times, but they failed. From 2004 to 2006, Yokoi competed sporadically in Hustle as a member of the babyface Hustle Army, teaming up with "Hustle K" Toshiaki Kawada, while trying luck in Zero-One's Fire Festival tournaments and keeping his team with Kohei Sato. He was released from Zero-One in February 2007, leaving pro wrestling altogether.

=== Brief return (2022–2024) ===
In 2022, after the worldwide pandemic, Yokoi came out of retirement for Zero1 and Towa Iwasaki's BURST spinoff promotion. In February 23, 2024 he teamed with Sato to defeat Satsuki Nagao and Takumi Saito, his last match to date.

== Championship and accomplishments ==
- All Japan Pro Wrestling
  - All Asia Tag Team Championship (1 time) - with Kohei Sato
  - All Asia Tag Team Title League (2003) - with Kohei Sato

== Mixed martial arts record ==
Professional record breakdown
16 matches	11 wins	5 losses
By knockout	2	4
By submission	5	1
By decision	4	0

Res.	Record	Opponent	Method	Event	Date	Round	Time	Location	Notes
Loss	11–5	Mikko Rupponen	TKO (strikes)	Fight Festival 21	March 17, 2007	1	2:51	Helsinki, Finland	
Win	11–4	Andre Fyeet	Submission (rear-naked choke)	World Pro Fighting Championships 1	September 15, 2006	1	3:11	Nevada, United States	
Loss	10–4	Quinton Jackson	TKO (punches and stomps)	PRIDE 30	October 23, 2005	1	4:05	Saitama, Japan	
Loss	10–3	Mario Sperry	TKO (knees)	PRIDE 29	February 20, 2005	1	9:08	Saitama, Japan	Return to Light Heavyweight.
Loss	10–2	Heath Herring	TKO (knees)	PRIDE 28	October 31, 2004	1	1:55	Saitama, Japan	
Loss	10–1	Antônio Rodrigo Nogueira	Submission (anaconda choke)	PRIDE Total Elimination 2004	April 25, 2004	2	1:25	Saitama, Japan	
Win	10–0	Wilson Gouveia	TKO (punches)	HOOKnSHOOT: Absolute Fighting Championships 2	March 28, 2003	3	2:26	Florida, United States	
Win	9–0	Jerrel Venetiaan	Submission (armbar)	PRIDE 23	November 24, 2002	2	3:29	Tokyo, Japan	
Win	8–0	Bulldozer George	Submission (rear-naked choke)	UFO: Legend	August 8, 2002	1	0:47	Tokyo, Japan	
Win	7–0	Memo Diaz	Decision (unanimous)	DEEP: 4th Impact	March 30, 2002	3	5:00	Nagoya, Japan	
Win	6–0	Katsuhisa Fujii	Decision (unanimous)	RINGS: World Title Series Grand Final	February 15, 2002	3	5:00	Yokohama, Japan	
Win	5–0	Kestutis Smirnovas	Decision	RINGS Lithuania: Bushido RINGS 3	November 10, 2001	2	5:00	Vilnius, Lithuania	
Win	4–0	Ken Orihashi	TKO (lost points)	RINGS: World Title Series 4	October 20, 2001	1	3:14	Tokyo, Japan	
Win	3–0	Masaya Kojima	Submission (armlock)	RINGS: Battle Genesis Vol. 8	September 21, 2001	1	2:12	Tokyo, Japan	
Win	2–0	Ricardo Fyeet	Submission (armbar)	RINGS: 10th Anniversary	August 11, 2001	1	2:34	Tokyo, Japan	
Win	1–0	Masaya Inoue	Decision (majority)	Shooto: R.E.A.D. 8	August 4, 2000	2	5:00	Osaka, Japan	Light Heavyweight bout.

== Submission grappling record ==
Result	Opponent	Method	Event	Date	Round	Time	Notes
Draw	(Japan) Koshi Matsumoto	Draw	Quintet Fight Night 2	February 3, 2019	1	10:00	
