= Kęstutis Andziulis =

Lithuanian artist and art restorer

- Born: January 20, 1948 (age 78); Jieznas
- Occupations: artist and art restorer.

Kęstutis Andziulis (born January 20, 1948, in Jieznas) is a Lithuanian artist and art restorer.

== Life ==
In 1973 he graduated from the Lithuanian Art Institute. Since 1973, he has contributed to the restoration of cultural monuments in Vilnius and since 1981, a Kaunas artist. In 1978, he studied art restoration in Erfurt, and 1998 in Florence.

He has contributed to restoring many churches and secular buildings, the decoration of wall paintings including:

- 1973–1974 Verkiai palace in Vilnius
- 1974–1979 St. Ion church in Vilnius, with others
- 1976–2000 Pažaislis church and monastery, frescoes
- 2005–2008 John Mackeviciaus panel Kaunas Chamber, the Great Hall of Duke Vytautas
