= Kenichi Yamamoto (mixed martial artist) =

Japanese professional wrestler and mixed martial arts fighter

- Born: June 11, 1976 (age 50); Kadoma, Osaka, Japan
- Other names: Yamaken
- Nationality: Japanese
- Height: 5 ft 11 in (1.80 m)
- Weight: 185 lb (84 kg)
- Division: Heavyweight; Light Heavyweight; Middleweight; Welterweight; Lightweight
- Style: Shoot wrestling, hybrid martial arts
- Team: Power of Dream
- Teachers: Nobuhiko Takada; Akira Maeda
- Years active: 1998-present

Mixed martial arts record
- Total: 19
- Wins: 5
- By knockout: 2
- By submission: 2
- By decision: 1
- Losses: 12
- By knockout: 7
- By submission: 3
- By decision: 2
- Draws: 2

Other information
- Mixed martial arts record from Sherdog

Kenichi Yamamoto (山本 喧一, Yamamoto Ken'ichi) (born June 11, 1976) is a Japanese mixed martial artist and professional wrestler. Known for his pro wrestling career in UWF International, Yamamoto also competed against some of the best MMA fighters of his era in RINGS, Pride and the UFC, taking on Kevin Randleman, Genki Sudo and Pat Miletich, among others. In 1999, Yamamoto won the UFC 23 Middleweight Tournament in Japan. He returned to the ring against former Light Heavyweight King Of Pancrase Keiichiro Yamamiya on October 27, 2012. He lost via unanimous decision. Following his combat sports career, Yamamoto now works as an MMA coach.

== Professional wrestling career ==
A fan of Akira Maeda, Yamamoto was trained in karate since his childhood and entered the Seidokaikan school before turning his attention to professional wrestling. In 1993, he was accepted in Union of Wrestling Forces International and debuted on October 14 in a match against Kazushi Sakuraba. After two years on the mid card, he joined Yoji Anjo and Yoshihiro Takayama to form the Golden Cups stable, in which he gained fame. In 1996, UWF International closed and Yamamoto moved to Kingdom, before eventually joining Fighting Network Rings in 1998. While in RINGS, he had to skip several months of action due to a surgery to remove a benign tumor, and ended up leaving the company in 1999.

== Mixed martial arts career ==
=== Ultimate Fighting Championship ===
In November 1999 Yamamoto had his Ultimate Fighting Championship debut at the UFC 23 event, taking part on the night's tournament. His first opponent was Wajutsu Keishukai representative Daiju Takase. The fight was slow, with Yamamoto being the superior striker and Takase constantly pulling guard to stop the action, so Kenichi resorted to headbutts to the midsection to do damage and even performed a cartwheel guard pass inspired on his training partner Sakuraba. Takase tried some high kicks and a triangle choke, but Yamamoto blocked them and landed punches and elbow strikes to the body, winning the decision.

The final fight was against Katsuhisa Fujii, which proved to be a tougher bout. The heavier Fujii took Yamamoto down several times and attacked with ground and pound, consistently endangering the former RINGS wrestler. However, after opting to pull guard at the start of the second round, Kenichi surprised Fujii with a kneebar and made him tap out, winning the fight and the tournament.

== Championships and accomplishments ==
=== Mixed martial arts ===
- Ultimate Fighting Championship
  - UFC 23 Middleweight Tournament Champion

=== Professional wrestling ===
- Wrestle Association "R"
  - WAR World Six-Man Tag Team Championship (1 time) – with Yoji Anjo & Yoshihiro Takayama

== Mixed martial arts record ==
Professional record breakdown
19 matches	5 wins	12 losses
By knockout	2	7
By submission	2	3
By decision	1	2
Draws	2	

Res.	Record	Opponent	Method	Event	Date	Round	Time	Location	Notes
Loss	5–12–2	Kazuo Takahashi	KO (knee)	U-Spirits - U-Spirits Again	March 9, 2013	1	6:29	Tokyo, Japan	
Loss	5–11–2	Keiichiro Yamamiya	Decision (unanimous)	Grabaka Live 2	October 27, 2012	2	5:00	Tokyo, Japan	
Loss	5–10–2	Sanae Kikuta	TKO (punches)	Grabaka Live: 1st Cage Attack	October 15, 2011	1	2:18	Tokyo, Japan	
Loss	5–9–2	Diego Lionel Vitosky	TKO (corner stoppage)	MARS: Bodog Fight	October 4, 2006	2	n/a	Tokyo, Japan	
Loss	5–8–2	Kaream Ellington	TKO (punches)	Mix FC: USA vs. Russia 3	June 3, 2006	1	4:51	Atlantic City, New Jersey	Light Heavyweight bout.
Win	5–7–2	German Reyes	KO (high kick)	Ryukyu Fight Night 2	November 13, 2005	2	2:20	Okinawa, Japan	
Loss	4–7–2	Ikuhisa Minowa	TKO (punches)	Pride Bushido 4	July 19, 2004	1	3:23	Nagoya, Japan	Return to Middleweight.
Loss	4–6–2	Alexander Otsuka	Decision (unanimous)	Pride 25	March 16, 2003	3	5:00	Yokohama, Japan	Return to Heavyweight.
Loss	4–5–2	Kevin Randleman	TKO (knees)	Pride 23	November 24, 2002	3	1:16	Tokyo, Japan	Light Heavyweight bout.
Loss	4–4–2	Genki Sudo	Submission (rear-naked choke)	Rings: World Title Series 5	December 21, 2001	2	1:46	Yokohama, Japan	Lightweight debut.
Draw	4–3–2	Akira Yasumura	Draw	Club Fight Nagoya	March 4, 2001	1	10:00	Nagoya, Japan	
Draw	4–3–1	Kenji Akiyama	Draw	Club Fight Osaka	January 27, 2001	1	10:00	Osaka, Japan	
Loss	4–3	Pat Miletich	Submission (guillotine choke)	UFC 29	December 16, 2000	2	1:58	Tokyo, Japan	Welterweight debut. For the UFC Welterweight Championship.
Win	4–2	Tatsuya Kurahashi	KO (punches)	Club Fight: Round 1	November 12, 2000	1	8:00	Tokyo, Japan	
Win	3–2	Katsuhisa Fujii	Submission (kneebar)	UFC 23	November 19, 1999	1	4:15	Urayasu, Japan	Won the UFC Japan Middleweight Tournament.
Win	2–2	Daiju Takase	Decision (unanimous)	UFC 23	November 19, 1999	3	5:00	Urayasu, Japan	
Loss	1–2	Kiyoshi Tamura	TKO	Rings: World Mega Battle Tournament	December 23, 1998	2	1:26	Tokyo, Japan	Return to Heavyweight.
Loss	1–1	Masayuki Naruse	Submission	Rings: Fourth Fighting Integration	June 27, 1998	1	11:07	Tokyo, Japan	Light Heavyweight debut.
Win	1–0	Chris Haseman	Submission	Rings: Third Fighting Integration	May 29, 1998	1	12:39	Tokyo, Japan	

== Muay Thai record ==
Kickboxing record
1 win (1 KO), 0 losses
Date	Result	Opponent	Event	Location	Method	Round	Time	Record	Notes
April 11, 2004	Win	(Thailand) Den Sakumonti	M-1 Muay Thai Challenge	Tokyo, Japan	KO (elbow)	3	1:24	1-0	Muay thai rules
Legend: Win Loss Draw/No contest
