= Kęstutis Kasparavičius =

Children's book illustrator and author

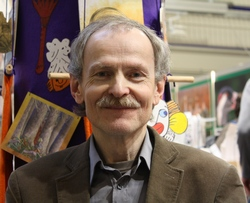
- Born: June 2, 1954 (age 72); Trakų rajonas, Lithuania
- Occupations: Author, illustrator
- Writing career
- Genres: Children, Family, Fantasy, Humor, Animals
- Notable works: The Missing Picture, Florentius the Gardener, Rabbit Marcus the Great
- Website: instagram.com/kestutisbooks

Kestutis Kasparavicius was born on 2 June 1954 Aukstadvaris, Lithuania. In 1962- 1972 studied at M.K.Ciurlionis Art School, a choir conducting class. In 1972- 1981 studied at the Academy of Fine Arts in Vilnius, a graphic design class. Since 1984 he has been working as a children's books illustrator and author and has completed 65 books. Kestutis favorite technology is watercolour. His books have published in 22 languages: Lithuanian, German, English, Spanish, Catalan, Portuguese, Italian, Estonian, Latvian, Bulgarian, Polish, Russian, Ukrainian, Croatian, Turkish, Chinese(Mandarin, Chinese(Simplified), Korean, Hungarian, Slovenian, Romanian, Albanian. In 1993 he was honored as Illustrator of the Year by Bologna Children's Book Fair, 2003 Bologna Illustrators Exhibition Award for Excellence and his illustrations have selected for fair's illustrators exhibition 13 times. Kestutis was also awarded the Golden Pen of Belgrade, 1990, the II Diploma Premi International Catalonia d`Illustracio, Barcelona, 1994, Diploma, Tallinn Illustrations Triennial, 2006; The Best Lithuanian Children's Book, 2005, 2007, 2008, 2009, 2012; Lithuanian Children's Literary Award, 2008; The Gold Sign of Lithuanian Artists Assotiation, 2010; Baltic Sea Region Jānis Baltvilks International Prize in Children's Literature and Book Art, Riga, 2010; Atrapallibres Award for Children's Literature, Barcelona, 2011; The White Ravens list, Internationale Jugendbibliothek, München, 2013; Premio Vittoria Samarelli, Associazione Giuseppe Acerbi, Castel Goffredo, 2013; "Außergewöhnliches Buch 2015", Internationalen Literaturfestival in Berlin, 2015; German and European Garden Book Award, 2018; Kęstutis was nomined for The Astrid Lindgren Memorial Award, 2005, 2006, 2013, 2014, 2015, 2017, and 2022 also for The Hans Christian Andersen Award, 2008, 2010 and 2018.

Kasparavičius is known for his short feel-good stories about various comic characters. Bears, pigs, rabbits, and turtles find themselves trapped in puzzling and thought-provoking situations. Kasparavičius draws children's attention with detailed, colorful, and bright watercolor illustrations that are accompanied by humorous and witty stories.

== Complete bibliography ==
- 1984, L.Vasiljeva-Gangnus The Crafty Art Lessons;
- 1985, A.Matutis Grey Forest Workers;
- 1986, A.Každailis The Little Flounder;
- 1986, V.Petkevičius Only Three Whelps;
- 1987, G.A.Burger Baron Munchhausen;
- 1987, J.Degutytė New Year;
- 1988, K.Sakalauskas-Vanagėlis Avid Dog;
- 1989, O.V.de Milosz Lithuanian Fairy Tales;
- 1989, J. Little Old man in the Hut;
- 1989, J.Ringelnatz Little Nothings;
- 1989, J.Erlickas Ticket from Heaven;
- 1990, J.Kasparavičius Beyond the Forest;
- 1990, J.Kruss The Bremen Town-Musicians;
- 1991, Ch.Morgenstern Ducks on Skates;
- 1991, G.A.Burger Munchhausen;
- 1992, E.Lear Duck and Kangaroo;
- 1993, C.Collodi Pinocchio;
- 1994, A.Každailis Caribbean Letters;
- 1994, F.Dostoevsky The Honest Thief;
- 1994, K.Kasparavičius Lazy Land;
- 1995, K.Kasparavičius Eastereggs;
- 1996, P.Maar Lisas Journey;
- 1996, A.Jussen Reineke Fox;
- 1997, The UNICEF Book of fairy Tales;
- 1997, K.Kasparavičius/P.Maar The Bear Family's Christmas;
- 1998, I.B.Singer Fairy Tales;
- 1998, E.T.A.Hoffmann The Nutcracker;
- 1999, C.M.Weber The Freeshooter;
- 2000, Kęstutis Kasparavičius The Bear Family's Christmas Journey;
- 2001, L.O.High The Last Chimney of Christmas Eve;
- 2002, C.Collodi Pinocchio Adventures (Monochrome pencil illustrations);
- 2002, A.Tompert The Pied Piper of Peru;
- 2002, H.Ch.Andersen The Little Match Girl;
- 2003, Kęstutis Kasparavičius Silly Stories(Kvailos Istorijos);
- 2003, J.Cheripko Brother Bartholomew and the Apple Grove;
- 2003, I.Thoma The Christmasteddy;
- 2004, Learn English with Aesop;
- 2004, A.Čeredejevaite Lazy Witch(Tinginė Ragana);
- 2005, Kęstutis Kasparavičius Short Stories(Trumpos Istorijos);
- 2005, H.Ch.Andersen Thumbelina;
- 2006, H.Ch.Andersen The Little Claus and Big Claus;
- 2006, Kęstutis Kasparavičius Strawberry Day(Braškių Diena);
- 2007, Kęstutis Kasparavičius The Missing Picture(Dingęs Paveikslas);
- 2007, L. Kavolė Grasshopper and Counter(Žiogas ir Skaičiuotojas);
- 2007, Kęstutis Kasparavičius Florentius the Gardener(Sodininkas Florencijus);
- 2008, Kęstutis.Kasparavičius Rabbit Marcus the Great(Kiškis Morkus Didysis);
- 2009, Plixe, Plaxe, Plexe,hier kommt Tine, Schusselhexe;
- 2009, Kęstutis Kasparavičius The White Elephant(Baltasis Dramblys);
- 2010, Kęstutis Kasparavičius The Little Winter(Mazoji Žiema);
- 2010, Kęstutis Kasparavičius The Bear Family Christmas Tour(Meškelionė) (new edition with the new text by Kestutis Kasparavicius);
- 2011, The Sharpest Spear and the Strongest Shield(Chinese fairy tale);
- 2012, Kęstutis Kasparavičius The Dream Cat(Sapnų Katytė);
- 2013, Kęstutis Kasparavičius The Underwater Story(Povandeninė Istorija);
- 2013, Kęstutis Kasparavičius, About Things(Apie daiktus);
- 2014, Kęstutis Kasparavičius, About Animals(Apie gyvūnus);
- 2015, Kęstutis Kasparavičius, Lazy Land(Tinginių Šalis), (new edition with the new text by Kestutis Kasparavicius);
- 2016, Kęstutis Kasparavičius, About This and That(Apie šį bei tą);
- 2016, Kęstutis Kasparavičius, The Neighbour around the Corner(Kaimynė už kampo);
- 2017, Kęstutis Kasparavičius, Dog's Life(Šuniškos Dienos);
- 2018, Kęstutis Kasparavičius, A Striped Story(Dryžuota istorija);
- 2022, Kęstutis Kasparavičius „Christmas! Christmas!”(Kalėdos! Kalėdos!);
- 2022, Kęstutis Kasparavičius, „Star Bird” (Žvaigždžių Paukštis);
- 2022, Kenneth Graham „The Wind in the Willows“;

== Awards and nominations ==
- 1990 Golden Pen award, Belgrade, for the book ‚New Year“ by J.Degutytė;
- 1993 UNICEF award “Illustrator of the Year”, Bologna Children's Book Fair, for the book „Duck and Kangaroo“ by E.Lear;
- 1994 II Diploma “Premi International Catalonia d`Illustracio”, Barcelona, for the book „The Honest Thief“ by F.Dostoevsky and „Schlaraffenland“ by R.Fröhlich;
- 2003 Award for Excellence, Bologna Children's Book Fair, for the book „The Pied Piper of Peru“ by A. Tompert;
- 2005 The Best Lithuanian Children's Book, for the book „Silly Stories“ by Kęstutis Kasparavičius;
- 2006 Diploma, Tallinn Illustrations Triennial, for the book „Short Stories“ by Kęstutis Kasparavičius;
- 2007 Diploma, Vilnius Book Fair, for the book „Short Stories“ by Kęstutis Kasparavičius;
- 2007 The Best Lithuanian Children's Book, for the book „The Missing Picture“ by Kęstutis Kasparavičius;
- 2008 The Best Lithuanian Children's Book, for the book „Florentius the Gardener“ by Kęstutis Kasparavičius;
- 2008, Salonul International de Carte pentru Copii, Chisinau, Moldova, for the book „Florentius the Gardener“ by Kęstutis Kasparavičius;
- 2008 Children's Literature Award by the Ministry of Education and Science of Lithuania;
- 2009 The Best Lithuanian Children's Book, for the book „The Hare Marcus the Great“ by Kęstutis Kasparavičius;
- 2010 Baltic Sea Region Jānis Baltvilks International Prize in Children's Literature and Book Art, Riga, for the book „The White Elephant“ by Kęstutis Kasparavičius;
- 2010 Golden Sign by Lithuanian Artists’ Association;
- 2011 Atrapallibres Award for Children's Literature, Barcelona, for the book „Short Stories“ by Kęstutis Kasparavičius;
- 2012 International Board on Books for Young People, IBBY Honor List, for the book „The Little Winter“ by Kęstutis Kasparavičius;
- 2012 The Best Lithuanian children's book, for the book „The Dream Cat“ by Kęstutis Kasparavičius;
- 2013 The White Ravens list, Internationale Jugendbibliothek, München, for the book „The Dream Cat“ by Kęstutis Kasparavičius;
- 2013 Premio Vittoria Samarelli, Associazione Giuseppe Acerbi, Castel Goffredo, for the book „Strawberyy Day“ by Kęstutis Kasparavičius;
- 2013 The most beautiful Lithuanian children's book, for the book „Underwater Story“ by Kęstutis Kasparavičius;
- 2015 Nami Concours(Korea), short list, for the book „The Shaky Knight“, by Kęstutis Kasparavičius;
- 2015 "Außergewöhnliches Buch“, 15. Internationalen Literaturfestival in Berlin, for the book „Pinocchio“ by C.Collodi;
- 2017 Nami Concours(Korea), short list, for the book „The Neighbour around the Corner“ by Kęstutis Kasparavičius;
- 2018 "German and European Garden Book Award“, Dennenlohe, the 2nd place in "The Best Garden Book for Children & Youth" category for the book „Florentius the Gardener“ by Kęstutis Kasparavičius;
- 2019 Lithuanian government Culture and Arts Award;
- 2020 The Order for Merits to Lithuania the Cross of the Knight;
- 2021 The winner of the Billboard Contest 2021, by Fine Art of America;
- Kestutis illustrations were selected to Bologna Children's Book Fair Illustrators Exhibition 1989, 1990, 1991,1992, 1993, 1994, 1996, 1999, 2000, 2001, 2003, 2008 and 2010.
- Kęstutis was nominated for IBBY Hans Christian Andersen award, 2008, 2010, 2018, 2020 and 2022;
- Kęstutis was nominated for The Astrid Lindgren Memorial Award, 2005, 2006, 2012, 2013, 2014, 2015, 2017, 2018, 2019, 2021 and 2023;
