= Kęstas Miškinis =

Kęstas Miškinis (December 3, 1932 - January 19, 2019) was a Lithuanian sports scientist and educator. He authored 7 textbooks, 16 books and many articles and educational aids.

He was born in the village of Meteliai, Lazdijai District Municipality, Lithuania.

== Books ==
- Prie mokyklos vairo: knyga mokyklų vadovams. (1982). Kaunas. 160 p.
- Šimtas atsakymų tėvams. (1985). Kaunas. 280 p.
- Vadovavimo mokyklai pagrindai. (1987). Vilnius. 215 p
- Trenerio pedagoginio meistriškumo pagrindai. (1988). Kaunas. 160 p.
- Šeimos pedagogika. (1993). Kaunas. 224 p
- Lietuvos kūno kultūros institutas. (1995). Kaunas. 352 p.
- Studentui apie institutą ir studijas: mokomoji knyga. (1998). Kaunas. 136 p
- Trenerio etika. (1998). Kaunas. 264 p.
- Kūno kultūros ir sporto specialistų tobulinimas (Monograph, 2000). Kaunas. 272 p
- Pokalbiai su tėvais: Mokomoji knyga. (2000) Kaunas. 236 p.
- Sporto pedagogikos pagrindai. (2002). Kaunas. 472 p.
- Šeima žmogaus gyvenime. (2003). Kaunas. 548 p.
- Trenerio veiklos optimizavimas. (2005). Vilnius. 230 p.
- Šeima pasaulio kultūrose. (2006). Kaunas. 286 p.
- Trenerio pagalbininkas. (2007). Vilnius. 382 p
- Laisvalaikio skaitiniai treneriams (2015). Kaunas, 191 p.
- Treneriams ir sportininkams apie filosofiją. (2016). Kaunas, 104 p

== Awards and recognition ==
- 1982 Honored teacher of the Lithuanian SSR
- 1993 Lithuanian Association of Pedagogues elected Pedagogue of the Year
- 1997 , 2000 Department of Physical Culture and Sports medal "For services to Lithuanian sport"
- 1999 International Olympic Committee Prize "Sports and Pedagogy"
- 2001 Lithuanian National Olympic Committee Olympic Star
- 2007 Department of Physical Culture and Sports 1st degree order "For services to Lithuanian sport" with chain
- 2013 honorary professor of the Lithuanian Sports University
