= Kęstutis Rimkus =

Lithuanian politician

Kęstutis Rimkus (born 12 April 1953) is a Lithuanian politician. In 1990 he was among those who signed the Act of the Re-Establishment of the State of Lithuania.
