= Kęstutis Stoškus =

Lithuanian photographer

Vilnius, a 2004 collection of photographs of the old town.

Kęstutis Ipolitas Stoškus is a Lithuanian architectural photographer and a museum curator.

Born in Dūdlaukis (Jurbarkas, Lithuania) on March 13, 1951, Stoškus graduated in economics from the University of Vilnius in 1973. He has worked as a photographer since 1985, and since 1994 has worked for the National Museum of Lithuania.

Stoškus works with medium- and large-format cameras to create detailed black-and-white photographs of the unspoiled parts of the old town of central Vilnius. Cars, advertising, signs of tourism, and even the presence of pedestrians — all are minimized in order not to detract from the architecture, his main interest.

Following Barocke Sakralarchitektur in Wilna (also published in Polish), for which he contributed the photographs, the first book dedicated to Stoškus's work was Vilnius: Photographs of the Old Town, a collection of some thirty images with an introduction by Raminta Jurėnaitė, who describes Stoškus both within a strong tradition of photography of Vilnius and as akin to Eugène Atget and Bernd and Hilla Becher as a systematic creator of documentary architectural work who is yet not commissioned.

Stoškus has had solo exhibitions in Gdańsk (1996, 1998, 2005–06), Valence (1997), Marburg and Leipzig (2002), and Kiel (2003).

== Cited sources and other sources ==
- Stoškus, Kęstutis. Barocke Sakralarchitektur in Wilna: Verfall und Erneuerung. Marburg: Herder-Institut, 2002. ISBN 3-87969-304-8 (Text in German.)
- Stoškus, Kęstutis. Wileńska architektura doby baroku. Dewastacja i restauracja. Instytut Sztuki PAN, 2005. ISBN 83-89101-39-4 (Polish edition of Barocke Sakralarchitektur.)
- Stoškus, Kęstutis. Vilnius: Senamiesčio fotografijos / Photographs of the Old Town. Vilnius: E. Karpavičiaus leidykla, 2004. ISBN 9955-9650-3-7 (Text in Lithuanian and English.)
- Pažaislis: menas ir istorija. Vilnius: E. Karpavičiaus leidykla, 2006. ISBN 9955-9650-4-5. With Eugenijus Karpavičius. On Pažaislis Monastery.
