= Kęstutis Grinius =

Lithuanian politician (born 1956)

Kęstutis Grinius (born 10 August 1956 in Marijampolė) is a Lithuanian politician. In 1990 he was among those who signed the Act of the Re-Establishment of the State of Lithuania.
