= Kęstutis Smirnovas =

Lithuania Judoka and MMA fighter

Kestutis Smirnovas
- Born: April 8, 1976 (age 50); Šakiai, Lithuanian SSR, USSR
- Nationality: Lithuanian
- Height: 5 ft 10 in (1.78 m)
- Weight: 198 lb (90 kg; 14.1 st)
- Division: Light Heavyweight; Heavyweight
- Style: MMA; Judo, Shooto
- Fighting out of: Lithuania
- Team: Audra Gym
- Rank: 4th Dan Black Belt in Judo
- Years active: 2000–2008, 2013-2014

Mixed martial arts record
- Total: 34
- Wins: 24
- By knockout: 3
- By submission: 14
- By decision: 6
- Unknown: 1
- Losses: 8
- By knockout: 3
- By submission: 4
- By decision: 1
- Draws: 2

Other information
- Mixed martial arts record from Sherdog

Kestutis Smirnovas is a Lithuanian MMA fighter and Judoka who fought in Pride Fighting Championships, RINGS, Shooto and HERO'S. He is also a politician and a public figure.

== Mixed martial arts career ==
=== Early career ===
Smirnovas started his career in 2000. He fought mainly for Rings Lithuania and Shooto Lithuania, obtaining a record of sixteen victories and five losses until the first half of 2005.

=== K-1 and K-1 Hero's ===
Smirnovas faced Tadeush Cholodinskij on March 10, 2006, at K-1: East Europe Max GP for the K-1 East Europe Max heavyweight title. He won via split decision after three, five-minutes rounds.

Smirnovas faced Pride FC veteran Kazushi Sakuraba on August 5, 2006, at K-1 Hero's 6 in the quarterfinal of Hero's 2006 light heavyweight grand prix. Despite dominating the beginning of the contest, almost knocking Sakuraba out with a long sequence of ground-and-pound, Smirnovas lost via submission due to an armbar still in the first round.

Smirnovas replaced Sakuraba in the semifinal as he was unable to compete due to medical conditions. He faced Yoshihiro Akiyama on October 9, 2006, at K-1 Hero's 7, losing via TKO in the first round.

== Championships and accomplishments ==
=== Mixed martial arts ===
- K-1
  - K-1 East Europe Max heavyweight title (2006)

== Mixed martial arts record ==
Professional record breakdown
33 matches	24 wins	8 losses
By knockout	3	3
By submission	14	4
By decision	6	1
Unknown	1	0
Draws	1	

Res.	Record	Opponent	Method	Event	Date	Round	Time	Location	Notes
Win	24–8–1	Grzegorz Lenart	Submission (armbar)	King of Kings: World Grand Prix 2014 in Vilnius	March 15, 2014	1	1:35	Vilnius, Lithuania	
Win	23–8–1	Mike Jonker	Submission (rear-naked choke)	Bushido Lithuania - Hero's 2013	November 16, 2013	1	3:58	Vilnius, Lithuania	
Win	22–8–1	David Marcina	Submission (kimura)	Shooto Lithuania: Bushido 2008	March 16, 2008	1	0:37	Vilnius, Lithuania	
Win	21–8–1	Damba Radnaev	Submission (armbar)	K-1 Hero's: Hero's Lithuania 2007	November 10, 2007	1	4:20	Vilnius, Lithuania	
Win	20–8–1	Vladimir Yushko	Submission (armbar)	Bushido Lithuania: Battle of Saule 2	September 29, 2007	1	1:40	Šiauliai, Lithuania	
Loss	19–8–1	Nobutatsu Suzuki	TKO (doctor stoppage)	Zst 13	June 10, 2007	1	5:00	Tokyo, Japan	
Draw	19–7–1	Valentin Golubovskij	Draw	K-1: East Europe Max	March 17, 2007	3	N/A	Vilnius, Lithuania	
Win	19–7	Thomas Valentin	KO (punches)	K-1 Hero's Lithuania	November 11, 2006	1	3:01	Vilnius, Lithuania	
Loss	18–7	Yoshihiro Akiyama	TKO (punches)	K-1 Hero's 7	October 9, 2006	1	3:01	Yokohama, Japan	Hero's 2006 light heavyweight grand prix semifinal; replaced Sakuraba due to medical conditions.
Loss	18–6	Kazushi Sakuraba	Submission (armbar)	K-1 Hero's 6	August 5, 2006	1	6:41	Tokyo, Japan	Hero's 2006 light heavyweight grand prix quarterfinal.
Win	18–5	Tadeush Cholodinskij	Decision (split)	K-1: East Europe Max GP	March 10, 2006	3	5:00	Vilnius, Lithuania	Won K-1 East Europe Max heavyweight title.
Win	17–5	Hiromitsu Miura	TKO (punches)	K-1 Hero's: Hero's Lithuania 2005	November 26, 2005	1	4:30	Vilnius, Lithuania	
Win	16–5	Grazhuydas Smailis	Submission (armbar)	Shooto Lithuania: Chaosas	April 7, 2005	N/A	N/A	Vilnius, Lithuania	
Loss	15–5	Rodolfo Amaro da Silva	TKO	Shooto Lithuania - Bushido	November 20, 2004	2	2:58	Vilnius, Lithuania	
Loss	15–4	Sam Nest	Submission (rear-naked choke)	Zst: Grand Prix 2 Opening Round	November 3, 2004	2	4:58	Tokyo, Japan	
Win	15–3	Romualds Garkulis	Submission (rear-naked choke)	Shooto Lithuania: Gladiators	September 29, 2004	1	1:37	Vilnius, Lithuania	
Win	14–3	Petras Markevicius	Submission (choke)	Shooto Lithuania: Bushido King	May 18, 2004	1	0:50	Vilnius, Lithuania	
Win	13–3	Vidmantas Tatarunas	Submission (choke)	Bushido Lithuania: Storm	April 30, 2004	N/A	N/A	Šakiai, Lithuania	
Win	12–3	Grazhuydas Smailis	Submission (rear-naked choke)	Shooto Lithuania: Vendetta	April 4, 2004	2	5:00	Vilnius, Lithuania	
Win	11–3	Egidijus Petrushkevicius	N/A	Bushido Lithuania: Ronin	March 14, 2004	N/A	N/A	Alytus, Lithuania	
Win	10–3	Grzegorz Jakubowski	Submission (rear-naked choke)	Shooto Lithuania: King of Bushido Stage 3	February 8, 2004	1	1:35	Vilnius, Lithuania	
Win	9–3	Roman Sukoterin	Decision (split)	Shooto Lithuania: King of Bushido Stage 1	November 14, 2003	2	5:00	Vilnius, Lithuania	
Win	8–3	Masaya Inoue	TKO (retirement)	Shooto - 9/5 in Korakuen Hall	September 5, 2003	1	5:00	Tokyo, Japan	
Win	7–3	Kestutis Stankevicius	Decision	Rings Lithuania: Explosion	May 10, 2003	N/A	N/A	Kaunas, Lithuania	
Win	6–3	Mariusz Ligizynski	Submission (kimura)	Rings Lithuania: Bushido Rings 7 – Adrenalinas	April 5, 2003	1	2:45	Vilnius, Lithuania	
Win	5–3	Darius Jonyla	Submission (armbar)	Rings Lithuania: Bushido Rings 6: Dynamite	December 14, 2002	N/A	N/A	Kaunas, Lithuania	
Win	4–3	Vladimir Smantster	Submission (armbar)	Rings Lithuania: Bushido Rings 5: Shock	November 9, 2002	1	N/A	Vilnius, Lithuania	
Win	3–3	Takahiro Oba	Submission (armbar)	Pride FC: The Best, Vol. 3	October 20, 2002	1	0:55	Tokyo, Japan	
Win	2–3	Pavel Dolgov	Decision	Rings Lithuania: Bushido Rings 4	May 4, 2002	2	5:00	Kaunas, Lithuania	
Loss	1–3	Hirotaka Yokoi	Decision	Rings Lithuania: Bushido Rings 3	November 10, 2001	2	5:00	Vilnius, Lithuania	
Loss	1–2	Mikhail Ilyukhin	Submission (achilles lock)	Rings Lithuania: Bushido Rings 2	May 8, 2001	1	N/A	Vilnius, Lithuania	
Win	1–1	Ruslan Mirzoev	Decision (3–2 points)	Rings Russia: Russia vs. Bulgaria	April 6, 2001	1	10:00	Yekaterinburg, Russia	
Loss	0–1	Victor Yerohin	Submission (leg lock)	Rings Lithuania: Bushido Rings 1	October 24, 2000	1	8:00	Vilnius, Lithuania	

== Politics and activism ==
Social activities: President of Šakiai judo sports club "Audra", member of the board of the Šakiai branch of LVTGO "Save the Children", member of the board of the Šakiai youth union "Apskritas stalas"

Since 2007 he is council member of Šakių district municipality.

In 2016 he was elected to the Seimas, defeating Prime Minister Algirdas Butkevičius in the Vilkaviškis electoral district.

== Personal ==
Daughter Julija Smirnovaitė from the first marriage with Gintarė, Simona, Paulina, Jakūbas from the second marriage.
