= RINGS King of Kings Tournament 2000 =

Fighting Network Rings MMA event in 2000

King of Kings Tournament 2000
- Promotion: Fighting Network Rings
- Date: October 9, 2000 - February 24, 2001
- City: Tokyo and Osaka

The King of Kings Tournament 2000 was a series of three separate mixed martial arts events held by the Fighting Network Rings (RINGS). The tournament took place in both Tokyo and Osaka between October 9, 2000 and February 24, 2001. The tournament was the second of two King of Kings tournaments.

== Rules ==
The tournament had two qualifying events: King of Kings 2000 Block A and King of Kings 2000 Block B. The fighters who advance from the qualifying events would compete in the King of Kings 2000 Final. The fights would consist of two five-minute rounds and, as in all RINGS bouts, no striking was allowed to the head of a grounded opponent.

=== Interesting Facts ===
This tournament had many participants who went on to have great success in mixed martial arts. Antônio Rodrigo Nogueira, Randy Couture, Dave Menne, and Fedor Emelianenko all became champions in their respective organizations (PRIDE Fighting Championships and UFC).

== King of Kings 2000 Block A ==
The first event of the tournament took place on October 9, 2000 at the Yoyogi National Stadium in Tokyo, Japan.

=== Results ===
King of Kings 2000 Block A Round of 16
Weight class				Method	Round	Time	Notes
	Antônio Rodrigo Nogueira	def.	Kiyoshi Tamura	Submission (Armbar)	2	2:29
	Randy Couture	def.	Ryushi Yanagisawa	Decision (Majority)	2	5:00
	Valentijn Overeem	def.	Renato Sobral	Submission (Toe Hold)	1	2:19
	Dave Menne	def.	Roberto Traven	Decision (Unanimous)	3	5:00
King of Kings 2000 Block A Round of 32
	Kiyoshi Tamura	def.	Zaza Tkeshelashvili	Decision (Unanimous)	2	5:00
	Antônio Rodrigo Nogueira	def.	Achmed Labasanov	Submission (Armbar)	1	1:38
	Ryushi Yanagisawa	def.	Borislav Jeliazkov	Submission (Toe Hold)	1	3:45
	Randy Couture	def.	Jeremy Horn	Decision (Unanimous)	3	5:00
	Renato Sobral	def.	Tariel Bitsadze	Submission (Armbar)	1	2:58
	Valentijn Overeem	def.	Suren Balachinskiy	TKO (Strikes)	1	2:13
	Dave Menne	def.	Wataru Sakata	Decision (Unanimous)	2	5:00
	Roberto Traven	def.	Mikhail Borissov	Decision (Unanimous)	2	5:00

== King of Kings 2000 Block B ==
The second event of the tournament took place on December 22, 2000 at the Osaka Prefectural Gymnasium in Osaka, Japan.

=== Results ===
King of Kings 2000 Block B Round of 16
Weight class				Method	Round	Time	Notes
	Yoshihisa Yamamoto	def.	Chris Haseman	TKO (Strikes)	1	3:51
	Tsuyoshi Kosaka	def.	Fedor Emelianenko	TKO (Doctor Stoppage)	1	0:17
	Hiromitsu Kanehara	def.	Tommy Sauer	TKO (Punches)	1	4:14
	Magomedkhan Gamzatkhanov	def.	Bobby Hoffman	Decision (Unanimous)	3	5:00
King of Kings 2000 Block B Round of 32
	Yoshihisa Yamamoto	def.	Ameran Bitsadze	Submission (Armbar)	1	4:39
	Chris Haseman	def.	Carlos Barreto	Decision (Unanimous)	2	5:00
	Tsuyoshi Kosaka	def.	Mikhail Ilyukhin	KO (Punches)	2	1:53
	Fedor Emelianenko	def.	Ricardo Arona	Decision (Unanimous)	3	5:00
	Hiromitsu Kanehara	def.	Alexandre Ferreira	Submission (Kimura)	2	2:45
	Tommy Sauer	def.	Andrei Kopylov	KO (Punch)	1	0:10
	Magomedkhan Gamzatkhanov	def.	Lee Hasdell	TKO (Punches)	2	0:08
	Bobby Hoffman	def.	Joop Kasteel	KO (Punches)	1	0:43

== King of Kings 2000 Final ==
The third and final event of the tournament took place on February 24, 2001 at The Ryogoku Kokugikan Sumo Arena in Tokyo, Japan.

=== Results ===
King of Kings 2000 Finals
Weight class				Method	Round	Time	Notes
	Antônio Rodrigo Nogueira	def.	Valentijn Overeem	Submission (Arm-Triangle Choke)	1	1:20
	Renato Sobral	def.	Kiyoshi Tamura	Decision (Majority)	2	5:00	(Note: Alternate bout.)
	Ryushi Yanagisawa	def.	Wataru Sakata	Decision (Split)	2	5:00	(Note: Alternate bout.)
King of Kings 2000 Semifinals
Weight class				Method	Round	Time	Notes
	Valentijn Overeem	def.	Randy Couture	Submission (Guillotine Choke)	1	0:56
	Antônio Rodrigo Nogueira	def.	Hiromitsu Kanehara	Submission (Rear-Naked Choke)	2	0:27
	Alistair Overeem	def.	Vladimer Tchanturia	Submission (Rear-Naked Choke)	1	1:06	(Note: Alternate bout.)
King of Kings 2000 Quarterfinals
Weight class				Method	Round	Time	Notes
	Valentijn Overeem	def.	Yoshihisa Yamamoto	Submission (Armbar)	1	0:45
	Randy Couture	def.	Tsuyoshi Kosaka	Decision (Unanimous)	2	5:00
	Antônio Rodrigo Nogueira	def.	Magomedkhan Gamzatkhanov	Decision (Unanimous)	2	5:00
	Hiromitsu Kanehara	def.	Dave Menne	TKO (Punches)	3	3:24

== Tournament Bracket ==
Round of 32
October 9, 2000

December 22, 2000

Round of 16
October 9, 2000

December 22, 2000

Quarterfinals
February 24, 2001

Semifinals
February 24, 2001

Finals
February 24, 2001

(Brazil)
Antonio Rodrigo Nogueira
SUB

(Russia)
Achmed Labasanov
1:38

(Brazil)
Antonio Rodrigo Nogueira
SUB

(Japan)
Kiyoshi Tamura
7:29

(Japan)
Kiyoshi Tamura
DEC

(Georgia (country))
Zaza Tkeshelashvili
10:00

(Brazil)
Antonio Rodrigo Nogueira
DEC

(Russia)
Magomedkhan Gamzatkhanov
10:00

(Russia)
Magomedkhan Gamzatkhanov
TKO

(England)
Lee Hasdell
5:08

(Russia)
Magomedkhan Gamzatkhanov
DEC

(United States)
Bobby Hoffman
15:00

(United States)
Bobby Hoffman
KO

(Netherlands)
Joop Kasteel
0:43

(Brazil)
Antonio Rodrigo Nogueira
SUB

(Japan)
Hiromitsu Kanehara
5:27

(Japan)
Hiromitsu Kanehara
SUB

(Brazil)
Alexandre Ferreira
7:45

(Japan)
Hiromitsu Kanehara
TKO

(United States)
Tommy Sauer
4:14

(United States)
Tommy Sauer
KO

(Russia)
Andrei Kopylov
0:10

(Japan)
Hiromitsu Kanehara
TKO

(United States)
Dave Menne
13:14

(United States)
Dave Menne
DEC

(Japan)
Wataru Sakata
10:00

(United States)
Dave Menne
DEC

(Brazil)
Roberto Traven
15:00

(Brazil)
Roberto Traven
DEC

(Russia)
Mikhail Borissov
10:00

(Brazil)
Antonio Rodrigo Nogueira
SUB

(Netherlands)
Valentijn Overeem
1:20

(Netherlands)
Valentijn Overeem
TKO

(Russia)
Suren Balachinskiy
2:13

(Netherlands)
Valentijn Overeem
SUB

(Brazil)
Renato Sobral
2:19

(Brazil)
Renato Sobral
SUB

(Georgia (country))
Tariel Bitsadze
2:58

(Netherlands)
Valentijn Overeem
SUB

(Japan)
Yoshihisa Yamamoto
0:45

(Japan)
Yoshihisa Yamamoto
SUB

(Georgia (country))
Ameran Bitsadze
4:39

(Japan)
Yoshihisa Yamamoto
TKO

(Australia)
Chris Haseman
3:51

(Australia)
Chris Haseman
DEC

(Brazil)
Carlos Barreto
10:00

(Netherlands)
Valentijn Overeem
SUB

(United States)
Randy Couture
0:56

(United States)
Randy Couture
DEC

(United States)
Jeremy Horn
15:00

(United States)
Randy Couture
DEC

(Japan)
Ryushi Yanagisawa
10:00

(Japan)
Ryushi Yanagisawa
SUB

(Bulgaria)
Borislav Jeliazkov
3:45

(United States)
Randy Couture
DEC

(Japan)
Tsuyoshi Kosaka
10:00

(Japan)
Tsuyoshi Kosaka
KO

(Russia)
Mikhail Ilyukhin
6:53

(Japan)
Tsuyoshi Kosaka
TKO

(Russia)
Fedor Emelianenko
0:17

(Russia)
Fedor Emelianenko
DEC

(Brazil)
Ricardo Arona
15:00

== See also ==
- Fighting Network Rings
- List of Fighting Network Rings events
- 2000 in Fighting Network Rings
- 2001 in Fighting Network Rings
