= Hans Nijman =

Dutch professional wrestler and mixed martial arts fighter

- Born: Johannes Petrus Nijman; 23 September 1959; Alkmaar, Netherlands
- Died: 5 November 2014 (aged 55); Beverwijk, Netherlands; Gunshot wounds
- Height: 6 ft 0 in (1.83 m)
- Weight: 246 lb (112kg)
- Division: Heavyweight
- Reach: 72.5 in (184 cm)
- Style: Karate, Kickboxing, Shoot wrestling
- Stance: Orthodox
- Fighting out of: Limburg, North Brabant, Netherlands
- Team: Dolman Gym; RINGS Holland; Team Hardcore; Dutch Top Team
- Teacher: Chris Dolman
- Rank: A-Class Shootist
- Years active: 1991-2013

Mixed martial arts record
- Total: 16
- Wins: 9
- By knockout: 4
- By submission: 4
- Unknown: 1
- Losses: 7
- By knockout: 1
- By submission: 5
- Unknown: 1

Other information
- Mixed martial arts record from Sherdog

Johannes Petrus "Hans" Nijman (September 23, 1959 – November 5, 2014) was a Dutch professional mixed martial artist and professional wrestler. He competed in the heavyweight division. He was a RINGS Holland veteran and fought for many other top promotions such as Pride FC and It's Showtime. Nijman is believed to have had connections with Willem Holleeder and other big names in the Dutch criminal underworld. His name appeared in several police records and has also been used in big court cases.

== Career ==
=== Fighting Network RINGS ===
A former Kyokushin karateka and kickboxing champion, Hans Nijman made his shoot wrestling debut in Japan for Fighting Network RINGS on December 7, 1991 as part of Chris Dolman's RINGS Holland team. The match was against Masaaki Satake, and the bout ended in a draw. Nijman also drew with Adam Watt, the following year. Nijman suffered his first loss on 25 June 1992 against Akira Maeda, due to submission. On 29 October 1992, Nijman defeated Georgi Keandelaki by knock-out, picking up his first win. 1994 was a good year for Hans, as he managed to gain knock-out victories over Mitsuya Nagai, Zaza Tkeshelashvili, Masayuki Naruse, Nikolai Zouev, and Dick Vrij.

On 25 January 1995, after RINGS started promoting purely competitive fights, Nijman beat Yoshihisa Yamamoto by TKO to win 3rd place in the RINGS Mega Battle Tournament 1994. Nijman lost to Tariel Bitsadze on 1 January 1997 at RINGS: Battle Dimensions. He beat Lee Hasdell by submission at RINGS Holland on 2 February 1997 before losing to Kiyoshi Tamura in Japan on 25 October 1997. Nijman's final fight for RINGS was on 7 March 1999 at RINGS Australia: NR 3. Hans defeated Danny Higgins by rear naked choke at 5:46 of round 1. He later entered the Pride Grand Prix 2000 Opening Round, losing to Kazuyuki Fujita by submission at 2:48 of round 1.

Throughout his RINGS career, Nijman picked up victories over fighters such as; Masayuki Naruse Yoshihisa Yamamoto, Mikhail Illoukhine, Volk Han, Tsuyoshi Kohsaka and Kiyoshi Tamura. Hans Nijman holds a RINGS record of 24 wins, 20 losses and 3 draws.

=== After RINGS ===
Nijman fought in Pride FC's open-weight tournament in 2000 at Pride Grand Prix 2000 Opening Round. Nijman lost to Kazuyuki Fujita by submission. On 21 October 2001, Nijman lost to Barrington Patterson by KO at It's Showtime - Original. Hans Nijman's last fight was against Cheick Kongo at It’s Showtime on 8 June 2003. He lost due to an armbar at 0:59 of round 2. According to Sherdog, Nijman rounded out his professional mixed martial arts record with 9 wins and 6 defeats, although Hans had a few unsanctioned shoot fights in Japan a year following his retirement from mixed martial arts competition in 2003.

== Death ==
On November 5, 2014, around 20:45, Nijman was shot dead whilst sitting in his 2013 Volkswagen Golf around the back of his Dutch Top Team gym "De Meer" in Beverwijk. Witnesses reportedly saw a Volkswagen Golf R32 parked on the parking lot next to his gym open fire on Nijman with automatic rifles whilst he was reversing his car out of the alley where he had parked his car. After the shooting, the Golf R32 took off with high speed southbound on the A22. A half-hour after the shooting two cars, the Golf R32 and a taxi bus, were found burning to the ground in Velserbroek. Both cars were stolen. The suspects have not yet been identified and the motive is unknown.

== Mixed martial arts record ==
Professional record breakdown
16 matches	9 wins	7 losses
By knockout	4	1
By submission	4	5
Unknown	1	1

Res.	Record	Opponent	Method	Event	Date	Round	Time	Location	Notes
Loss	9–7	Minoru Suzuki	Submission (kneebar)	U-Spirits - Again	March 9, 2013	2	1:52	Tokyo, Japan, Korakuen Hall	
Loss	9–6	Cheick Kongo	Submission (armbar)	It's Showtime: Amsterdam Arena	June 8, 2003	2	0:59	Amsterdam, Netherlands	
Loss	9–5	Barrington Patterson	TKO (punches)	It's Showtime: Original	October 21, 2001	1	1:47	Haarlem, Netherlands	
Loss	9–4	Kazuyuki Fujita	Submission (scarf hold)	Pride Grand Prix 2000 Opening Round	January 30, 2000	1	2:48	Tokyo, Japan	
Win	9–3	Danny Higgins	Submission (rear-naked choke)	Rings Australia: NR 3	March 7, 1999	1	5:46	Alexandra Hills, Queensland, Australia	
Loss	8–3	Hiromitsu Kanehara	Submission (armbar)	Rings: World Mega Battle Tournament	December 23, 1998	1	9:04	Japan	
Win	8–2	Vladimir Klementiev	Submission	Rings: Fourth Fighting Integration	June 27, 1998	1	4:44	Tokyo, Japan	
Win	7–2	Victor Kruger	KO (head kick)	Rings Holland: Who's the Boss	June 7, 1998	1	0:10	Utrecht City, Netherlands	
Loss	6–2	Kiyoshi Tamura	Submission (armlock)	Rings - Mega Battle Tournament 1997 Semifinal 1	October 25, 1997	1	10:34	Japan	
Win	6–1	Lee Hasdell	Submission (guillotine choke)	Rings Holland - The Final Challenge	February 2, 1997	1	5:35	Amsterdam, Netherlands	
Loss	5–1	Tariel Bitsadze	N/A	Rings - Battle Dimensions Tournament 1996 Final	January 1, 1997				
Win	5–0	Allen Harris	Submission (guillotine choke)	Rings Holland: Kings of Martial Arts	February 18, 1996	2	1:30	Amsterdam, Netherlands	
Win	4–0	Volk Han	TKO	Rings: Budokan Hall 1996	January 24, 1996			Tokyo, Japan	
Win	3–0	Ramaji Buzoriashivilli	N/A	Rings: Battle Dimensions Tournament 1995 Opening Round	October 21, 1995			Japan	
Win	2–0	Andrei Kopylov	KO (knee)	Rings Holland: Free Fight	February 19, 1995	1	3:10	Amsterdam, Netherlands	
Win	1–0	Yoshihisa Yamamoto	KO (punch)	Rings: Budokan Hall 1995	January 25, 1995	1	0:43	Tokyo, Japan	
