= Lee Hasdell =

English kickboxer, combat sport promoter and mixed martial arts fighter

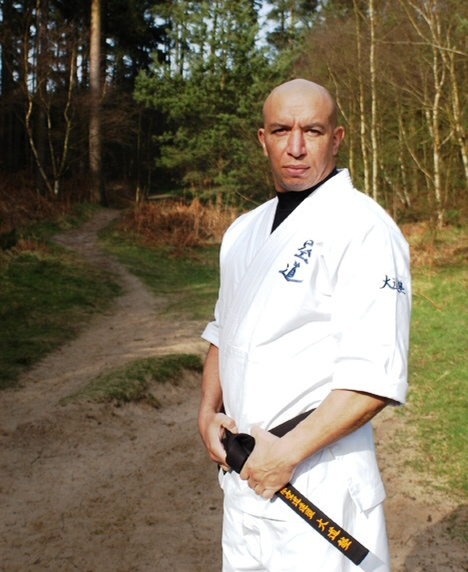
- Born: Lee John Hasdell; 13 December 1966 (age 59); Northampton, England
- Other names: Kagemusha; Godfather of UK MMA; The Gatekeeper
- Height: 6 ft 1 in (1.85 m)
- Division: Kickboxing (1989-2002); Super-Welterweight -; Super Heavyweight; Mixed martial arts (1995-2007); Heavyweight/Open-weight; Light-Heavyweight
- Style: Shin Senjutsu
- Fighting out of: Milton Keynes, England
- Team: SSJ
- Rank: 7th dan black belt in Kickboxing; 7th dan black belt in Karate; 2nd dan black belt in Kudo Daido Juku; Black belt in Ju-jitsu; Black belt in submission arts Wrestling
- Years active: 1989–2009

Kickboxing record
- Total: 60
- Wins: 43
- By knockout: 28
- Losses: 17

Mixed martial arts record
- Total: 33
- Wins: 13
- By knockout: 7
- By submission: 5
- By disqualification: 1
- Losses: 16
- By knockout: 4
- By submission: 7
- By decision: 5
- Draws: 3
- No contests: 1

Other information
- Website: www.ssjstudio.net
- Mixed martial arts record from Sherdog
- Last updated on: 1 September 2023

Lee Hasdell (born 13 December 1966) is a British martial artist, promoter and former professional kickboxer and mixed martial artist. Hasdell is considered by many to be a pioneer of mixed martial arts in the United Kingdom, particularly in the 1990s, when he drove a great deal of innovation in the field. Hasdell promoted the first professional mixed martial arts events in the UK and helped develop many of the standards within the British MMA scene of today.

Hasdell began his professional career in 1989, as a Muay Thai boxer, becoming a three-time British champion in kickboxing and Thai boxing. In 1995, he became one of the first British fighters to compete in K-1 and soon began crossing over into mixed martial arts as a shootfighter. In 1996, he won the inaugural Oktagon challenge, an eight-man shootboxing tournament held in Milan, Italy. Then in 1997, he made his debut for Fighting Network RINGS in Japan and would go on to have the majority of his fights there until 2001. His final mixed martial arts bout was in 2007, on the UK promotion Cage Rage. Hasdell's professional and competitive career spanned over 20 years with almost 100 bouts in kickboxing, mixed martial arts and submission grappling.

== Biography ==
=== Martial arts background ===
Lee Hasdell began martial arts in 1979, at the age of 12, learning taekwondo under Morris Young who was the European full-contact taekwondo heavyweight champion. Lee later took up boxing and then karate as he felt that it was more of a mixed style that suited his stand up. After winning a number of local tournaments he decided to study full-contact Karate. In 1985, when he was 18 he started weight training and kickboxing. In 1987, he moved to Milton Keynes from Northampton where he began Thai boxing. Hasdell was taught by Bryan Walker, who was one of Master Toddy's first generation instructors and would train under him until 1992.

=== Kickboxing career (1989–1995) ===
Hasdell began his professional kickboxing career in January 1989, at the age of 22 as a super-welterweight Thai boxer. In 1991, Lee went over to train at the Gym International and the Chakuriki Gym in Amsterdam, Netherlands. This is where Lee was first introduced to Japanese Kickboxing and Kyokushin methods. On 9 March 1991, Hasdell won the WKA British super-middleweight kickboxing title. The following month he moved up to light-heavyweight and won the B.I.K.M.A British Thai boxing title. He later added the B.I.K.M.A British light-heavyweight freestyle title in 1992. Hasdell remained undefeated as British champion for two years.

Hasdell's quest for the European title began on 28 May 1993, in Katowice, Poland. He fought Paval Rumas for the ISKA European light-heavyweight full contact title and lost by split decision after 10 rounds. Hasdell later moved up to super light-heavyweight and challenged for both the WKA Commonwealth and European Muay Thai titles. He lost the first title fight against Duncan Airlie James due to a cut in October 1993. This bout was only one week removed from originally receiving the cut in a Thai boxing match in Arnhem, Netherlands against Perry Telgt. Still ranked no.1 in Britain, Hasdell fought for the European title on 22 January 1994, against Bob Schrijber at the Olympic Stadium in Moscow, Russia. Hasdell was stopped near the end of the last round due to leg kicks.

In April 1994, Hasdell trained at the Seidokaikan Dojo in Japan, the headquarters for the K-1 organisation. He also attended the K-1 Grand Prix '94 as a stand by fighter. On 17 October 1994, Hasdell made a move to super-cruiserweight when he defeated French fighter Bruno Fariot by first round knock-out. He later returned to train at the Chakuriki Gym to prepare for his future fights and was ranked no.1 in the Commonwealth ratings.

On 15 April 1995, Hasdell fought undefeated American fighter Curtis Schuster for the ISKA world super-heavyweight Muay Thai title in Paris, France. Hasdell lost in the first round via a knee strike. On 3 September 1995, he became one of the first British fighters to compete in K-1 when he fought South African Duane Van Der Merwe at K-1 Revenge II in Yokohama, Japan. Hasdell, who was significantly smaller than his opponent, lost in the first round by clinch knees.

=== Transition into mixed martial arts (1995–1997) ===
Lee Hasdell was first exposed to mixed martial arts in 1992, when teaching kickboxing at a Japanese Boarding School, he began cross training with the Japanese martial arts instructors in Judo, Karate and Jujitsu. Then whilst he was competing at K-1, Hasdell shared a dressing room with the mixed martial artists that were competing that night. They had Vale Tudo and shootfighting bouts on the card, which Hasdell watched with interest and when he returned from Japan, he began grappling.

On 15 October 1995, Lee Hasdell promoted a kickboxing event in Milton Keynes, England which featured three shootfighting contests. The main attraction was a match between Hasdell and American freestyle wrestler Boston Jones. The fight was billed as "The first ultimate shootfight in Britain". Hasdell won the fight by technical-knockout due to a cut from a knee in round 2.

On 18 February 1996, Hasdell made his shootfighting debut for Rings Holland at Kings of Martial Arts against Dutch Thai boxer and multiple time world champion Andre Mannaart. Although the fight ended in a draw, it brought Hasdell to the attention of Akira Maeda, the president of Fighting Network RINGS.

On 20 April 1996, Hasdell entered the world Oktagon challenge, an eight-man shootboxing tournament held in Milan, Italy. The tournament featured fighters from the United States, Israel, Spain, Netherlands, Nigeria, France and Italy, all representing eight different martial arts. Hasdell represented the UK and the art of freestyle fighting. The event was attended by 14,000 spectators. The rules of the tournament allowed grappling on the ground; wearing ten ounce gloves with thirty seconds of ground fighting. At the time it was considered 'free-fighting', a name that originally referred to mixed martial arts. Hasdell went through to the final with two knockouts over American Jeet Kun Do practitioner Scott Dobbs and Italian Judo and Karate champion Paolo Di Clemente. In the final he defeated Andre Mannaart by decision to become the new world Oktagon champion.

Following his Oktagon victory, Hasdell was invited to train at the Rings Dojo in Yokohama, Japan for four weeks. Upon his return he began staging unofficial invitational matches in preparation for his future events and competed in mixed rules matches throughout the year. Hasdell would also fight in a no holds barred match in October 1996.

=== Shootfighting in Japan, Netherlands and UK (1997–1999) ===
On 2 February 1997, Hasdell made his second appearance for Rings Holland; now with Akira Maeda in his corner, fought Rings veteran Hans Nijman in Amsterdam, Netherlands. This bout ended up having a controversial finish. In the second round Nijman had Hasdell in a guillotine choke, Hasdell grabbed the ropes for a rope escape although the referee did not see it, forcing Hasdell to tap out to break the hold.

On 4 April 1997, Hasdell made his debut for Fighting Network RINGS in Tokyo, Japan. He defeated American Sean McCully by guillotine choke at 3:59. Hasdell returned to Tokyo two months later to compete in the Rings light-heavyweight tournament for the divisions inaugural title and lost to Masayuki Naruse in the quarter-finals by submission.

On 5 October 1997, Hasdell promoted his first official mixed martial arts event; the first in the United Kingdom, called Total Fight Night. He would also feature on the card and defeated Dutch karate champion Peter Dijkman by rear naked choke, winning the vacant U.T.F super-fight heavyweight shootfighting title. Later that same month, Hasdell competed in the annual RINGS: Mega Battle Tournament, a 16-man tournament to determine the first ever Rings open-weight champion. In the round of 16, he lost to Joop Kasteel by submission.

On 13 December 1997, Lee Hasdell made a brief return to kickboxing when he entered an 8-man tournament in Prague, Czech Republic. He took on Mirko Filipovic in the quarter-finals and was defeated by TKO (cut) in round 2.

On 8 March 1998, at Hasdell's second mixed martial arts event Night of the Samurai, he fought Dutch fighter Sander Thonhauser in a Vale Tudo match, winning by armbar at just 55 seconds of round 1 to win the vacant U.T.F super-fight heavyweight Vale Tudo title.

On 29 May 1998, Hasdell fought Hiromitsu Kanehara in Sapporo, Japan. The match went the full thirty minutes and Kanehara was declared the winner due to multiple forced rope escapes. Just over a week later in Utrecht, Netherlands he beat Dutch fighter Dave van der Veen by knock-out in the second round, securing his first victory in Rings Holland.

On 21 September 1998, Hasdell defeated future UFC Japan winner, Kenichi Yamamoto by KO in Yokohama, Japan. On 11 October 1998, Hasdell re-matched Hiromitsu Kanehara, this time at Night of the Samurai II in Milton Keynes, England and after 15 minutes, Hasdell lost again by decision. Later that month, he fought Gilbert Yvel in Heerenveen, Netherlands and was defeated via technical-knockout due to a cut in the first round.

On 20 November 1998, Hasdell began what would be a trilogy of matches with Yasuhito Namekawa. Their first confrontation was held in Osaka, Japan; after twenty minutes it was declared a draw. Their rematch was held on 23 January 1999, at the Budokan Hall in Tokyo, Japan. Hasdell received a yellow card for an illegal punch and failed to knock out Namekawa after landing multiple knee strikes, losing the contest by decision. The third and final bout was held in Milton Keynes, England at Night of the Samurai III on 7 March 1999. Hasdell was trailing the fight by two points before knocking Namekawa out with a knee strike at 5:55.

He returned to Japan on 23 April 1999, defeating future DEEP Japan middleweight champion, Ryuki Ueyama via to disqualification and submitting Ricardo Fyeet four months later. On 15 September 1999, Hasdell fought Satoshi Honma in Tokyo, Japan and after twenty minutes, the bout ended in a draw. The following month, Hasdell faced Dave van der Veen for a second time at Total Fight KRG 5 in Milton Keynes, England. Hasdell won by armbar at 1:47 of the first round to retain his U.T.F super-fight heavyweight shootfighting title.

=== Rings King of Kings, injuries and hiatuses (1999–2002) ===
On 28 October 1999, Hasdell competed in the RINGS King of Kings Tournament 1999, in the round of 32 he defeated Achmed Labasanov by TKO in round 2. Hasdell was eliminated in the following round by Brazilian fighter Renato Sobral by unanimous decision. Hasdell became the first British fighter to compete in a major international mixed martial arts tournament. This was the first event in Rings to introduce the King of Kings rules with Vale Tudo gloves, rounds and judges. Hasdell took a break after this tournament to heal an injured knee.

In 2000, Hasdell was awarded his blackbelt in Ju Jutsu and personally invited by the Prince of Abu Dhabi, United Arab Emirates to compete in the ADCC Submission Wrestling World Championship on 1 March 2000. Hasdell competed in the +99 kg category and was eliminated by South African Mark Robinson after the match went the distance.

On 16 April 2000, Hasdell made another kickboxing comeback at K-1 UK Battle of Britain 2000 held in Birmingham, England. This was the first K-1 event to be held in the United Kingdom. Hasdell defeated world heavyweight kickboxing champion Simon Dore by KO (flying knee) at 0:30 of round 3.

Hasdell returned to mixed martial arts when he travelled to Moscow, Russia on 29 April 2000, to compete in the IAFC – Absolute Fighting Championships. In the first round, Hasdell lost to IAFC champion and eventual winner of the tournament Mikhail Avetisyan due to ground and pound.

On 20 May 2000, he fought Mikhail Illoukhine at Rings Russia – Russia vs. the World, losing by split decision. Two weeks later Hasdell rematched Joop Kasteel, this time in the Netherlands. Hasdell lost the fight due to a dislocated shoulder in the opening round after knocking Kasteel down twice early in the match.

He returned six months later on 22 December 2000, and took on Rings veteran Volk Han in the round of 32 of the annual King of Kings tournament. Hasdell lost by TKO in the second round after he suffered an eye injury from one of the punches.

On 21 January 2001, Hasdell won the Kamon European Brazilian Jujitsu tournament in London. A week later, Hasdell rematched Sander Thonhauser in the Netherlands. During the bout Thonhauser kneed Hasdell clean in the face while Hasdell was still on the floor, which is an illegal move; following a retaliation by Hasdell, the match was declared a no contest in the opening round. Hasdell was then scheduled to face British fighter James Zikic on 11 March 2001, at Millennium Brawl 2 but pulled out due to an eye injury he received in training.

In August 2001, Hasdell was given an award from Akira Maeda in Japan for his hard work, dedication and contribution to the martial arts worldwide.

Hasdell returned to competition in the Absolute Class Tournament at Rings World Title Series on 20 October 2001. In the quarter-finals he beat Bulgarian Judo player Georgi Tonkov by flying knee in round 1. On 21 December 2001, in the semi-final of the tournament, Hasdell lost to Fedor Emelianenko by guillotine choke in the first round. This was the first time since 25 October 1997 that Hasdell had submitted due to a submission hold, a total of over four years and 23 bouts (including submission grappling). At the age of 35, Lee Hasdell finished his 6-year career with Rings as the promotion would cease operating from 2002.

=== Post Rings (2002–2009) ===
Shortly after competing in his final mixed martial arts bout in Rings, Hasdell competed in a shootboxing match on 2 February 2002, in Tokyo, Japan against French fighter Cyrille Diabate. Hasdell lost by TKO due to referee stoppage at 2:18 of round 4.

Lee Hasdell resumed his mixed martial arts career on 24 April 2004, at Pain and Glory, held at the NEC in Birmingham, England. Now fighting at 92 kg, around 10 kg lighter than his fighting weight in Rings, he defeated Japanese fighter Hiroyuki Ito by knock-out at 0:32 of round 1.

At the age of 40, after a 3-year hiatus from the sport, Hasdell made his Cage Rage debut at Cage Rage 22 on 14 July 2007, at Wembley Arena in London. He fought Brazilian Mario Sperry in the light-heavyweight division and lost by rear naked choke in the first round. On 1 December 2007, Hasdell fought Italian Ivan Serati at Cage Rage 24. Hasdell lost again by rear naked choke at 1:34 of round 2 in what would be his final professional mixed martial arts bout to date.

On 23 May 2009, Lee Hasdell took part in the U.M.A. International Open Groundfighting and Grappling Championships. Hasdell achieved Gold in the open weight masters division.

== Promoting ==
=== Total Fight Forum (RINGS UK) ===
In 1997, Hasdell formed Universal Total-Fight Forum (U.T.F), later known as Total Fight Forum (T.F.F) in conjunction with Rings and would later become president for Rings UK. On 5 October 1997, Hasdell promoted UTF's first professional event called 'Total Fight Night'. The show featured Vale Tudo and (Rings rules) shootfighting matches. The following year on 8 March 1998, Hasdell promoted the first in a series of events called Night of the Samurai. The follow-up Night of the Samurai II was held on 11 October 1998, and then Night of the Samurai III on 7 March 1999. Hasdell later promoted a fifth event called Total Fight KRG 5 on 3 October 1999.

At the time, these were large MMA shows that were said to have changed the face of martial arts in the UK forever. Total Fight Forum featured international fighters from Japan, United States, Netherlands, France and Spain. The events were held at the Sanctuary Music Arena and Planet Ice in Milton Keynes, England. Hasdell also promoted many amateur Rings rules and Vale Tudo competitions between 1998 and 1999.

In 2000, Lee Hasdell promoted the Ring of Truth series, these were three events featuring Vale Tudo and Rings king of kings bouts, it also featured a Ring of Truth Vale Tudo tournament. These events were again held at the Sanctuary Music Arena in Milton Keynes.

On 9 June 2001, Hasdell staged a Grassroots competition featuring grappling, Thai boxing and Rings king of kings bouts.

These events produced and featured fighters such as James Zikic, The magical Dexter Casey, Bobby Razak, Paul Cahoon, Gary Turner, Ian Freeman, Lee Murray, Mark Weir, Valentijn Overeem, Wataru Sakata, Hiromitsu Kanehara, Yasuhito Namekawa, Jess Liaudin and Danny Batten.

==== Criticism of MMA in the UK ====
The events were the source of some criticism in the UK with critics arguing for an outright ban or better regulation of the events. Hasdell responded to the complaints, arguing;

"In Japan you are seen as an athlete. [...] Here there is this taboo. It's always on the fringe. I admit it's dangerous but that adds to the thrill of taking part and watching. [...] The sport's appeal is the fact that it is the most dangerous martial art in this country which is a pull for audiences, half of which are women. [...] But all the fighters are properly trained, the rule book is 32 pages long, and there is not much contact to the head. Also all fighters must be a black belt in their martial art or a recognized champion".

After relocating from the Sanctuary Music Arena to Planet Ice in Milton Keynes, Hasdell claimed;

"We managed to sell 3,000 tickets. The council were watching and they realized that they can’t stop this. Milton Keynes' council became the experts. They knew about the paramedics, the rules and the legal requirements. When other promoters started springing up around the U.K., all the councils went running to Milton Keynes and basically carbon copied all their documentation",

Hasdell also insisted that the sport is adequately controlled and have an amazing safety record. Hasdell's events were featured on many News programs such as LWT Nightlife, Trevor McDonald's Tonight programme on 22 July 1999 and also appeared on Johnny Vaughan's The Big Breakfast show on 15 March 2000.

=== Combudo ===
Lee Hasdell founded the Combudo organisation in 2000, and has staged many amateur events since. In 2008, he promoted a professional Combudo event featuring bouts under K-1, kickboxing and Thai boxing rules. The second professional event was held in 2009, and featured mixed martial arts matches. Combudo specialises in modern Japanese Hybrid Budo Martial Arts and fuses together the ethics and spirituality of traditional budo with modern style self-defence and combat sports.

=== Other events ===
Lee Hasdell promoted multiple amateur and professional kickboxing events between 1993 and 1995. On 15 October 1995, Hasdell promoted Fighting Arts Gala in Milton Keynes. This event featured three shootfighting bouts on a mainly kickboxing stacked card and set the stage for his first official mixed martial arts event in 1997.

In 2002 and 2003, Hasdell promoted the UZI-Cage Combat Evolution series, two mixed martial arts events held in a Cage.

Between 2009 and 2018, Lee Hasdell was the new and first ISKA UK National Director for MMA.

On 9 March 2012, Hasdell took one of his students to compete at Fighting Network RINGS's first official event in Japan for ten years. His student defeated K-1 fighter Takayuki Kohiruimaki at RINGS: Reincarnation. The following year, Hasdell took an amateur team to compete at the RINGS: Rings/The Outsider event held on 9 June 2013.

In 2013, Hasdell became a consultant for the ISKA sanctioned 'KT-MMA' promotion.

== Championships and accomplishments ==
=== Kickboxing ===
- World Kickboxing Association (WKA)
  - British super-middleweight (−76 kg) kickboxing champion (1991)
- British & International Kickboxing & Martial Arts Association (B.I.K.M.A)
  - British light-heavyweight (−79 kg) Thai boxing champion (1991)
  - British light-heavyweight (−79 kg) free-style champion (1992)
- FENASCO
  - world Oktagon shootboxing champion (1996)

=== Mixed martial arts ===
- Universal Total-Fight Forum (U.T.F) / Total-Fight Forum (T.F.F)
  - super-fight heavyweight (90 kg+) shootfighting champion (1997)
  - super-fight heavyweight (95 kg+) Vale Tudo champion (1998)

=== Submission grappling ===
- Kamon European Brazilian Jiu-Jitsu open winner (2001) (gold)
- UMA 'No Gi' groundfighting championships (Men's masters division open-weight) winner (2009) (gold)

=== Belts and honors ===
- Kickboxing (ISKA) – 7th Dan Black Belt
- Kickboxing (WKA) – 7th Dan Black Belt
- Karate (BCKA/EKF) – 7th Dan Black Belt
- Jujutsu (W.C.J.J.O) – Black Belt (2000)
- Kudo Daido-Juku (KIF) – 2nd Dan Black Belt – Master Azuma (2008)
- Submission Arts Wrestling (SAW/AJJTF) – Black Belt – Master Aso (2013)
- Russian Ninja-Kan – Black Belt (2019)
- Combat Magazine Hall of Fame (1998)
- Martial Arts Illustrated Magazine Hall of Fame (2015)

== Mixed martial arts record ==
- This mixed martial arts record includes the rules of: shootfighting, Japanese hybrid – Rings king of kings (KOK), no holds barred (NHB), Vale Tudo and unified rules of MMA.

Professional record breakdown
33 matches	13 wins	16 losses
By knockout	7	4
By submission	5	7
By decision	0	5
By disqualification	1	0
Draws	3	
No contests	1	

Res.	Record	Opponent	Method	Event	Date	Round	Time	Location	Notes
Loss	13–16–3 (1)	Ivan Serati	Submission (rear naked choke)	Cage Rage 24	1 December 2007	2	1:34	London, England	
Loss	13–15–3 (1)	Mario Sperry	Submission (rear naked choke)	Cage Rage 22	14 July 2007	1	1:39	London, England	
Win	13–14–3 (1)	Hiroyuki Ito	KO (knee and punches)	Pain and Glory 2004	24 April 2004	1	0:32	Birmingham, England	
Loss	12–14–3 (1)	Fedor Emelianenko	Submission (guillotine choke)	RINGS: World Title Series 5	21 December 2001	1	4:10	Kanagawa, Japan	RINGS: Absolute Class Tournament 2001 (semi-finals)
Win	12–13–3 (1)	Georgi Tonkov	KO (flying knee)	RINGS: World Title Series 4	20 October 2001	1	4:22	Tokyo, Japan	RINGS: Absolute Class Tournament 2001 (quarter-finals)
NC	11–13–3 (1)	Sander Thonhauser	No contest	RINGS Holland: Heroes Live Forever	28 January 2001	1	1:16	Utrecht, Netherlands	Originally a disqualification victory for Hasdell, overturned to a no contest after an altercation erupted
Loss	11–13–3	Volk Han	TKO (eye injury)	RINGS: King of Kings 2000 Block B	22 December 2000	2	0:08	Osaka, Japan	RINGS: King of Kings Tournament 2000 (round of 32)
Loss	11–12–3	Joop Kasteel	TKO (shoulder injury)	RINGS Holland: Di Capo Di Tutti Capi	4 June 2000	1	1:18	Utrecht, Netherlands	
Loss	11–11–3	Mikhail Illoukhine	Decision (split)	RINGS Russia: Russia vs. The World	20 May 2000	3	5:00	Ekaterinburg, Russia	
Loss	11–10–3	Mikhail Avetisyan	Submission (strikes)	IAFC – Absolute Fighting Championship 2000 (Day 2)	29 April 2000	1	2:53	Moscow, Russia	IAFC – Absolute Fighting Pankration Championship 2000 (quarter-finals)
Loss	11–9–3	Renato Sobral	Decision (unanimous)	RINGS: King of Kings 1999 Block A	28 October 1999	2	5:00	Tokyo, Japan	RINGS: King of Kings Tournament 1999 (round of 16)
Win	11–8–3	Achmed Labasanov	TKO (kick)	RINGS: King of Kings 1999 Block A	28 October 1999	2	3:33	Tokyo, Japan	RINGS: King of Kings Tournament 1999 (round of 32)
Win	10–8–3	Dave van der Veen	Submission (armbar)	T.F.F – Total Fight KRG 5	3 October 1999	1	1:47	Milton Keynes, England	Retained U.T.F Super-Fight Heavyweight Shootfighting title
Draw	9–8–3	Satoshi Honma	Draw	RINGS: Battle Genesis Vol. 5	15 September 1999	1	20:00	Tokyo, Japan	
Win	9–8–2	Ricardo Fyeet	Submission (toe hold)	RINGS: Rise 5th	19 August 1999	1	15:01	Yokohama, Japan	
Win	8–8–2	Ryuki Ueyama	Disqualification (eye-gouging)	RINGS: Rise 2nd	23 April 1999	1	4:18	Osaka, Japan	
Win	7–8–2	Yasuhito Namekawa	KO (knee)	T.F.F – Night of the Samurai 3	7 March 1999	1	5:55	Milton Keynes, England	
Loss	6–8–2	Yasuhito Namekawa	Decision	RINGS: Mega battle Tournament 1998: Grand Final	23 January 1999	1	20:00	Tokyo, Japan	Hasdell lost by 0–1 point for an illegal punch.
Draw	6–7–2	Yasuhito Namekawa	Draw	RINGS battle Tournament 1998: First Round	20 November 1998	1	20:00	Osaka, Japan	
Loss	6–7–1	Gilbert Yvel	TKO (cut)	RINGS Holland: The Thialf Explosion	24 October 1998	1	N/A	Heerenveen, Netherlands	
Loss	6–6–1	Hiromitsu Kanehara	Decision	T.F.F – Night of the Samurai 2	11 October 1998	1	15:00	Milton Keynes, England	Lost by 0–2 points
Win	6–5–1	Kenichi Yamamoto	KO (palm strikes)	RINGS: Fighting Integration 6th	21 September 1998	1	10:56	Yokohama, Japan	
Win	5–5–1	Dave van der Veen	KO (palm strikes)	RINGS Holland: Who's the Boss	7 June 1998	2	4:47	Utrecht, Netherlands	
Loss	4–5–1	Hiromitsu Kanehara	Decision	RINGS: Fighting Integration 3rd	29 May 1998	1	30:00	Sapporo, Japan	Lost by 0–6 points
Win	4–4–1	Sander Thonhauser	Submission (armbar)	T.F.F – Night of the Samurai 1	8 March 1998	1	0:55	Milton Keynes, England	Won vacant U.T.F Super-Fight Heavyweight Vale Tudo title
Loss	3–4–1	Joop Kasteel	Submission (headlock)	RINGS: Mega Battle Tournament 1997: First Round	25 October 1997	1	8:55	Tokyo, Japan	RINGS: Mega Battle Tournament 1997 (round of 16)
Win	3–3–1	Peter Dijkman	Submission (rear naked choke)	U.T.F – Total Fight Night	5 October 1997	1	4:46	Milton Keynes, England	Won vacant U.T.F Super-Fight Heavyweight Shootfighting title
Loss	2–3–1	Masayuki Naruse	Submission (north/south choke)	RINGS: Fighting Extension Vol. 4	21 June 1997	1	12:58	Tokyo, Japan	RINGS: Light-Heavyweight Title Tournament (quarter-finals)
Win	2–2–1	Sean McCully	Submission (guillotine choke)	RINGS: Battle Genesis Vol. 1	4 April 1997	1	3:59	Tokyo, Japan	
Loss	1–2–1	Hans Nijman	Submission (guillotine choke)	RINGS Holland: The Final Challenge	2 February 1997	2	0:51	Amsterdam, Netherlands	Hasdell made a rope escape but the referee failed to see it and declared the contest a Submission victory for Nijman.
Loss	1–1–1	Cees Bezems	TKO (cut)	IMA: Battle of Styles	26 October 1996	1	N/A	Amsterdam, Netherlands	No holds barred
Draw	1–0–1	Andre Mannaart	Draw	RINGS Holland: Kings of Martial Arts	18 February 1996	2	5:00	Amsterdam, Netherlands	
Win	1–0	Boston Jones	TKO (cut)	RP – Fighting Arts Gala	15 October 1995	2	2:30	Milton Keynes, England	

== Kickboxing record (incomplete) ==
Kickboxing record
43 wins (28 (T)KOs), 17 losses
Date	Result	Opponent	Event	Location	Method	Round	Time	Record	Rules
2002-02-01	Loss	(France) Cyrille Diabate	The Age of S: Volume 1	Tokyo, Japan	TKO (doctor stoppage)	4	2:18	43–17	Shootboxing
2000-04-16	Win	(England) Simon Dore	K-1 UK Battle of Britain 2000	Birmingham, England	KO (flying knee)	3	0:30	43–16	Oriental
1997-12-13	Loss	(Croatia) Mirko Filipović	Kickboxing Tournament Prague 1997, quarter-final	Prague, Czech Republic	TKO (cut)	2		42–16	Oriental
1996-04-20	Win	(Netherlands) Andre Mannaart	world Oktagon challenge 1996, final	Milan, Italy	Decision	5	3:00	42–15	Shootboxing
Won FENASCO world Oktagon shootboxing title.
1996-04-20	Win	(Italy) Paolo Di Clemente	world Oktagon challenge 1996, semi-final	Milan, Italy	KO (knee)	2	1:02	41–15	Shootboxing
1996-04-20	Win	(United States) Scott Dobbs	world Oktagon challenge 1996, quarter-final	Milan, Italy	TKO (kicks)	1	1:08	40–15	Shootboxing
1995-09-03	Loss	(South Africa) Duane Van Der Merwe	K-1 Revenge II	Yokohama, Japan	KO (clinch knees)	1	0:30	39–15	Oriental
1995-04-15	Loss	(United States) Curtis Schuster	Gala de Levallois-Perret	Paris, France	KO (knee)	1	1:03		Thai-Boxing
For the ISKA world super-heavyweight Muay Thai title.
1994-11-27	Loss	(England) Danny Norton	WKA Championship Kickboxing	Birmingham, England					Full-Contact
For the WKA Commonwealth super-cruiserweight full-contact title.
1994-11-13	Exhibition	(England) Marv Leeson	RP – The Kickboxing Showdown	Milton Keynes, England					Full-Contact
1994-10-17	Win	(France) Bruno Fariot	B.I.K.A – Simply the Best III	Northampton, England	KO (left hook)	1	1:20		
1994-05-00	Win	(Netherlands) Dennis Krauweel	NKBB Kickboxing	Rotterdam, Netherlands	Decision				Thai-Boxing
1994-04-10	Win	(England) Bertil Queely	RP – Kusala vs. Best of the Rest	Milton Keynes, England	TKO (referee stoppage)	3			Thai-Boxing
1994-01-22	Loss	(Netherlands) Bob Schreiber	WKA Championships	Moscow, Russia	TKO (leg kicks)	5			Thai-Boxing
For the vacant WKA European super light-heavyweight Muay Thai title.
1993-10-09	Loss	(Scotland) Duncan Airlie James	WKA Kickboxing	Wolverhampton, England	TKO (cut)	1	2:00		Thai-Boxing
For the vacant WKA Commonwealth super light-heavyweight Muay Thai title.
1993-10-02	Loss	(Netherlands) Perry Telgt	NKBB Kickboxing	Arnhem, Netherlands	TKO (cut)	2			Thai-Boxing
1993-06-25	Loss	(England) Paul Senior	Championship Kickboxing	Bedford, England	Split decision	7	2:00		Full-Contact
For the WKA British light-heavyweight full-contact title.
1993-06-13	Exhibition	(England) Lee Tilton	KGP – Kickboxing – England vs. Wales	Milton Keynes, England					Kickboxing
1993-05-28	Loss	(Poland) Paval Rumas	ISKA Kickboxing Championships	Katowice, Poland	Split decision	10	2:00		Full-Contact
For the ISKA European light-heavyweight full-contact title.
1993-03-07	Win		KGP – Thai Kickboxing	Milton Keynes, England					
1992-10-25	Win	(Netherlands) Jerrell Vjent		Bromley, England					
1992-10-02	Win	(England) Everton Crawford	Branko's Gym Promotions	Bedford, England	Decision	5	2:00		Thai-Boxing
Retained B.I.K.M.A British light-heavyweight Thai boxing title.
1992-07-18	Win	(England) Everton Crawford	B.I.K.A – Simply The Best	Bracknell, England					Thai-Boxing
Retained B.I.K.M.A British light-heavyweight Thai boxing title.
1992-07-03	Win	(England) Bertil Queely	Branko's Gym Promotions	Bedford, England	KO (leg kicks)	2			Kickboxing
Won B.I.K.M.A British light-heavyweight free-style title.
1991-06-28	Win		Branko's Gym Promotions	Bedford, England					Thai-Boxing
Retained B.I.K.M.A British light-heavyweight Thai boxing title.
1991-04-26	Win	(England) Nik Pavlovic	Branko's Gym Promotions	Bedford, England	Decision	5	2:00		Thai-Boxing
Won B.I.K.M.A British light-heavyweight Thai boxing title.
1991-03-09	Win	(England) Tony Manterfield	An Evening of Kickboxing	Barnsley, England	TKO (threw in the towel)	7			Kickboxing
Won WKA British super-middleweight kickboxing title.
1990-00-00	Loss	(England) Ian Ledson		Wigan, England	Decision	5	2:00		Thai-Boxing
For the WTBF British Junior light-Heavyweight Thai boxing title.
1990-00-00	Loss	(Wales) Eugene Valerio		North Wales, Wales	Decision	5	2:00		Thai-Boxing
For the IFCF British super-middleweight Thai boxing title.
1989-00-00	Win	(England) Dave Gonquin	ECKA - A Kickboxing Spectacular	Northampton, England	KO (punches)	3			Thai-Boxing
1989-00-00	Loss	(England) Richard Baxter	World Championship Kickboxing	England	Decision	4	2:00		Kickboxing
1989-00-00	Win			Nantwich, England	Decision				Thai-Boxing
1989-00-00	Win	(England) Graham Rookley		Milton Keynes, England	Decision	4	2:00		Thai-Boxing
1989-04-09	Win	(England) Graham Chester		Milton Keynes, England	TKO	2			Thai-Boxing
1989-02-10	Win	(England) Chris Haines		Nantwich, England	TKO	2			Thai-Boxing
1989-01-00	Loss	(England) Brian Harris		Winsford, England	Decision	3	2:00		Kickboxing
Legend: Win Loss Draw/no contest Notes
