= Ricardo Morais =

Brazilian martial artist

- Born: Ricardo Morais; February 26, 1967 (age 59); Rio de Janeiro, Brazil
- Other names: The Mutant; The Spear Chucker
- Height: 6 ft 8 in (203 cm)
- Weight: 270 lb (122 kg; 19 st 4 lb)
- Division: Super Heavyweight
- Style: Brazilian Jiu-Jitsu, Boxing
- Team: Banni Fight Combat Jiu-jitsu (MMA)
- Years active: 1995–2006

Mixed martial arts record
- Total: 15
- Wins: 10
- By knockout: 8
- By submission: 1
- By decision: 1
- Losses: 4
- By knockout: 1
- By decision: 3
- Draws: 1

Other information
- Mixed martial arts record from Sherdog
- Last updated on: September 6, 2009

Ricardo Morais
Medal record

Men's Grappling

Representing Brazil

ADCC World Championship
Silver medal – second place	1998 Abu Dhabi	Absolute

Ricardo "The Mutant" Morais is a Brazilian former mixed martial artist, who competed in Pride Fighting Championships, Jungle Fight, and Rings - MMA. Morais trained with the Banni Fight Combat Jiu-Jitsu to support, Banni Cavalcanti, even after his last fight in the sport, which was a victory, coming against Tae Hyn Lee at Pride Final Conflict Absolute, 10 September 2006.

== Background ==
Ricardo Morais trained in Brazilian jiu-jitsu and boxing early in his career. Later he began training in Black House with Anderson Silva, Antônio Rodrigo Nogueira.

== Career ==
Morais won a 32-fighter tournament "IAFC: Absolute Fighting Championship 1" in Moscow in 1995. Next year he continued his MMA career in Japan at RINGS.

=== Grappling ===
Morais took part in ADCC World Championships in 1998, 1999 and 2000. He won silver medal in 1998.

=== The Smashing Machine ===
In 2003, HBO aired a documentary titled "The Smashing Machine: The Life and Times of Extreme Fighter Mark Kerr." Morais was shown a lot in this movie leading up to his match against Mark Coleman at Pride 8.

Morais is shown training with Renzo Gracie in the movie. He lost to Coleman by decision. Morais won a 32-man tournament in Moscow in 1995 that included Pride FC legends Tra Telligman and Igor Vovchachyn. Morais choked out Mikhail Illoukhine in finals.

== Championships and accomplishments ==
- Fight Matrix
  - 1995 Rookie of the Year
- International Absolute Fighting Championship
  - IAFC Absolute Fighting Championship 1 Tournament Winner

== Mixed martial arts record ==
Professional record breakdown
15 matches	10 wins	4 losses
By knockout	8	1
By submission	1	0
By decision	1	3
Draws	1	

Res.	Record	Opponent	Method	Event	Date	Round	Time	Location	Notes
Win	10–4–1	Lee Tae-Hyun	TKO (corner stoppage)	PRIDE FC: Final Conflict Absolute	September 10, 2006	1	8:08	Saitama, Japan	
Loss	9–4–1	Alexander Emelianenko	KO (punches)	PRIDE Bushido 6	April 3, 2005	1	0:15	Yokohama, Japan	
Loss	9–3–1	Tsuyoshi Kosaka	Decision (unanimous)	NJPW Ultimate Crush II	October 13, 2003	3	5:00	Tokyo, Japan	
Win	9–2–1	Mestre Fumaca	TKO (punches)	Jungle Fight 1	September 13, 2003	1	2:06	Manaus, Brazil	
Loss	8–2–1	Mark Coleman	Decision (unanimous)	Pride 8	November 21, 1999	2	10:00	Tokyo, Japan	
Win	8–1–1	Hiromitsu Kanehara	Decision	Rings: Final Capture	February 21, 1999	5	5:00	Japan	
Loss	7–1–1	Zaza Tkeshelashvili	Decision	Rings - Mega Battle Tournament 1997 Semifinal	December 23, 1997	1	20:00	Japan	
Win	7–0–1	Sergio Muralha	TKO (submission to punches)	Pentagon Combat	September 27, 1997	1	0:17	Brazil	
Draw	6–0–1	Yuriy Kochkine	Draw	Rings - Extension Fighting 4	June 21, 1997	1	20:00	Tokyo, Japan	
Win	6–0	Yoshihisa Yamamoto	KO (punches)	Rings - Maelstrom 6	August 24, 1996	1	0:46	Japan	
Win	5–0	Mikhail Illoukhine	Submission (rear naked choke)	IAFC: Absolute Fighting Championship 1	November 25, 1995	1	9:44	Luzhniki Sports Palace, Moscow, Russia	
Win	4–0	Victor Yerohin	TKO (submission to punches)	IAFC: Absolute Fighting Championship 1	November 25, 1995	1	1:33	Luzhniki Sports Palace, Moscow, Russia	
Win	3–0	Maxim Tarasov	TKO (submission to punches)	IAFC: Absolute Fighting Championship 1	November 25, 1995	1	1:49	Luzhniki Sports Palace, Moscow, Russia	
Win	2–0	Onassis Parungao	TKO (knees)	IAFC: Absolute Fighting Championship 1	November 25, 1995	1	1:16	Luzhniki Sports Palace, Moscow, Russia	
Win	1–0	Alex Andrade	TKO (submission to punches)	IAFC: Absolute Fighting Championship 1	November 25, 1995	1	1:48	Luzhniki Sports Palace, Moscow, Russia	

== Submission grappling record ==
? Matches, ? Wins, ? Losses, ? Draws
Result	Record	Opponent	Method	Event	Date	Location
Loss	7–4	(United States) Rigan Machado	-	2000 ADCC World Championships	March 1, 2000	Abu Dhabi, United Arab Emirates
Loss	7–3	(Brazil) Ricco Rodriguez	-	2000 ADCC World Championships	March 1, 2000	Abu Dhabi, United Arab Emirates
Win	7–2	(South Africa) Mark Robinson	-	2000 ADCC World Championships	March 1, 1999	Abu Dhabi, United Arab Emirates
Win	6–2	(United States) Carlos Clayton	-	2000 ADCC World Championships	March 1, 1999	Abu Dhabi, United Arab Emirates
Win	5–2	(Australia) Chris Haseman	Decision · Points	1999 ADCC World Championships	February 24, 1999	Abu Dhabi, United Arab Emirates
Win	4–2	(United States) Tra Telligman	Decision · Points	1999 ADCC World Championships	February 24, 1999	Abu Dhabi, United Arab Emirates
Loss	3–2	(Brazil) Mario Sperry	Decision	1998 ADCC World Championships	March 20, 1998	Abu Dhabi, United Arab Emirates
Win	3–1	(United States) Joe Charles	Foot Lock · 7:33 · R1	1998 ADCC World Championships	March 20, 1998	Abu Dhabi, United Arab Emirates
Win	2–1	(United States) Toby Imada	Choke · 9:22 · R1	1998 ADCC World Championships	March 20, 1998	Abu Dhabi, United Arab Emirates
Loss	1–1	(United States) Ricco Rodriguez	Decision · Points	1998 ADCC World Championships	March 20, 1998	Abu Dhabi, United Arab Emirates
Win	1–0	(Egypt) Salah Al Din	Armbar 5:24 · R1	1998 ADCC World Championships	March 20, 1998	Abu Dhabi, United Arab Emirates
