= Tariel Bitsadze =

Georgian Karate and MMA fighter

- Born: January 12, 1966 (age 60); Georgia
- Nationality: Georgian
- Height: 2.00 m (6 ft 6 1/2 in)
- Weight: 150 kg (330 lb; 24 st)
- Division: Heavyweight; Super heavyweight
- Style: Kyokushin
- Team: Rings Georgia
- Rank: Black belt in Kyokushin
- Years active: 1995 - 2000

Mixed martial arts record
- Total: 13
- Wins: 7
- By knockout: 2
- Unknown: 5
- Losses: 6
- By submission: 5
- Unknown: 1

Other information
- Mixed martial arts record from Sherdog

Tariel Bitsadze (Georgian: ტარიელ ბიწაძე) is a Georgian karateka and mixed martial artist. He competed in the Heavyweight and Super heavyweight division. He is a former RINGS Openweight Champion.

== Mixed martial arts career ==
A former 1991 World Open Karate Championship finalist who was eliminated by Andy Hug, Bitsadze trained for his mixed martial arts debut in his Fighting Network RINGS's RINGS Georgia team, taking in both editions of the King of Kings tournament. He was pitted against RINGS Holland exponent Gilbert Yvel at the first one, but he was taken down and submitted via armbar, thus being eliminated from the league. Tariel performed better at the next edition, threatening Renato Sobral with a close guillotine choke attempt, but being eventually caught in an armbar again and eliminated.

== Mixed martial arts record ==
Professional record breakdown
13 matches	7 wins	6 losses
By knockout	2	0
By submission	0	5
Unknown	5	1

Res.	Record	Opponent	Method	Event	Date	Round	Time	Location	Notes
Loss	7–6	Renato Sobral	Submission (armbar)	Rings: King of Kings 2000 Block A	October 9, 2000	1	2:58	Tokyo, Japan	
Loss	7–5	Gilbert Yvel	Submission (armbar)	Rings: King of Kings 1999 Block B	December 22, 1999	1	2:18	Osaka, Japan	
Win	7–4	Joop Kasteel	TKO	Rings: Rings Georgia	October 8, 1999	1	4:11	Georgia	
Loss	6–4	Joop Kasteel	Submission (keylock)	Rings: Rise 4th	June 24, 1999	1	6:01	Japan	
Loss	6–3	Kiyoshi Tamura	Submission (rear-naked choke)	Rings: Rise 3rd	May 22, 1999	1	9:19	Japan	Lost the RINGS Openweight Championship.
Win	6–2	Kiyoshi Tamura	TKO	Rings: Third Fighting Integration	May 29, 1998	1	3:39	Tokyo, Japan	Won the RINGS Openweight Championship.
Loss	5–2	Dick Vrij	Submission (rear-naked choke)	Rings: Mega Battle Tournament 1997 Semifinal 1	October 25, 1997	1	6:07	Japan	
Win	5–1	Yoshihisa Yamamoto	N/A	Rings: Budokan Hall 1997	January 22, 1997	0	0:00	Tokyo, Japan	
Win	4–1	Yoshihisa Yamamoto	N/A	Rings: Battle Dimensions Tournament 1996 Final	January 1, 1997	0	0:00		
Loss	3–1	Magomedkhan Gamzatkhanov	N/A	Rings: Battle Dimensions Tournament 1996 Final	January 1, 1997	0	0:00		
Win	3–0	Hans Nijman	N/A	Rings: Battle Dimensions Tournament 1996 Final	January 1, 1997	0	0:00		
Win	2–0	Nikolai Zouev	N/A	Rings: Battle Dimensions Tournament 1996 Opening Round	October 25, 1996	0	0:00		
Win	1–0	Dimitre Petkov	N/A	Rings: Battle Dimensions Tournament 1995 Opening Round	October 21, 1995	0	0:00		
