= 1995 in Fighting Network Rings =

Mixed martial arts events

Information
- First date: January 25, 1995
- Last date: October 21, 1995

Events
- Total events: 3

Fights
- Total fights: 24

Chronology
1995 in Fighting Network Rings	1996 in RINGS

The year 1995 is the first year in the history of Fighting Network Rings, a mixed martial arts promotion based in Japan. In 1995 Fighting Network Rings held three events beginning with, Rings: Budokan Hall 1995.

== Events list ==
#	Event title	Date	Arena	Location
3	Rings: Battle Dimensions Tournament 1995 Opening Round	October 21, 1995		
2	Rings Holland: Free Fight	February 19, 1995	Sporthallen Zuid	Amsterdam, North Holland, Netherlands
1	Rings: Budokan Hall 1995	January 25, 1995	Budokan Hall	Tokyo, Japan

== Rings: Budokan Hall 1995 ==
Rings: Budokan Hall 1995 was an event held on January 25, 1995, at Budokan Hall in Tokyo, Japan.

=== Results ===
Main Card
Weight class				Method	Round	Time	Notes
	Magomedkhan Gamzatkhanov	def.	Akira Maeda	N/A	0	0:00
	Hans Nijman	def.	Yoshihisa Yamamoto	N/A	0	0:00
	Dick Vrij	def.	Tony Halme	N/A	0	0:00
	Mitsuya Nagai	def.	Mark Ashford	N/A	0	0:00
	Satir Gotchev	def.	Masayuki Naruse	N/A	0	0:00
	Bob Schrijber	def.	Aruzini Lusinoff	N/A	0	0:00
	David Khakhaleishvili	def.	Herman Renting	N/A	0	0:00
	Tsuyoshi Kosaka	def.	Wataru Sakata	N/A	0	0:00

== Rings Holland: Free Fight ==
Rings Holland: Free Fight was an event held on February 19, 1995, at Sporthallen Zuid in Amsterdam, North Holland, Netherlands.

=== Results ===
Main Card
Weight class				Method	Round	Time	Notes
	Joop Van De Ven	def.	John Ouwerkerk	Submission (half crab lock)	1	1:41
	Herman Renting	def.	David Levicki	Decision (unanimous)	1	10:00
	Chris Dolman	def.	Akira Maeda	Submission (armbar)	2	4:07
	Dick Vrij	def.	Mitsuya Nagai	KO (knee)	1	3:07
	Yoshihisa Yamamoto	def.	Ruud Ewoldt	Decision (unanimous)	3	5:00
	Willie Peeters	def.	Masayuki Naruse	Decision (unanimous)	1	10:00
	Piet Bernzen	def.	Ronny Rivano	Decision (unanimous)	1	10:00
	Hans Nijman	def.	Andrei Kopylov	KO (knee)	1	3:10

== Rings: Battle Dimensions Tournament 1995 Opening Round ==
Rings: Battle Dimensions Tournament 1995 Opening Round was an event held on October 21, 1995.

=== Results ===
Main Card
Weight class				Method	Round	Time	Notes
	Tariel Bitsadze	def.	Dimitre Petkov	N/A	0	0:00
	Akira Maeda	def.	Dick Vrij	N/A	0	0:00
	Magomedkhan Gamzatkhanov	def.	Peter Ura	N/A	0	0:00
	Andrei Kopylov	def.	Zaza Tkeshelashvili	N/A	0	0:00
	Hans Nijman	def.	Ramaji Buzoriashivilli	N/A	0	0:00
	Mikhail Ilyukhin	def.	Nikolai Zouev	N/A	0	0:00
	Yoshihisa Yamamoto	def.	Ameran Bitsadze	N/A	0	0:00
	Mitsuya Nagai	def.	Bakouri Gogitidze	N/A	0	0:00

== See also ==
- Fighting Network Rings
- List of Fighting Network Rings events
