= Jonny van Wanrooy =

Dutch mixed martial arts fighter

- Born: Netherlands
- Nationality: Dutch
- Height: 6 ft 0 in (1.83 m)
- Weight: 185 lb (84 kg; 13.2 st)
- Division: Middleweight
- Team: Loek's Gym
- Years active: 1997 - 2004

Mixed martial arts record
- Total: 12
- Wins: 3
- By knockout: 1
- By decision: 2
- Losses: 8
- By knockout: 1
- By submission: 5
- By decision: 2
- No contests: 1

Other information
- Mixed martial arts record from Sherdog

Jonny van Wanrooy is a Dutch mixed martial artist. He competed in the Middleweight division.

== Mixed martial arts record ==
Professional record breakdown
12 matches	3 wins	8 losses
By knockout	1	1
By submission	0	5
By decision	2	2
No contests	1	

Res.	Record	Opponent	Method	Event	Date	Round	Time	Location	Notes
Loss	3-8 (1)	Olivier Buanec	Submission (armbar)	Shooto Holland: Knock-Out Gala 3	March 28, 2004	1	3:29	Vlissingen, Netherlands	
Loss	3-7 (1)	Nic Osei	Submission	VF 1: The Ultimate Challenge	February 23, 2002	1	0:00	Denmark	
NC	3-6 (1)	Evert Fyeet	No Contest	Together Productions: Fight Gala	October 27, 2001	0	0:00	Zaandam, North Holland, Netherlands	
Loss	3-6	Nathan Schouteren	Submission (kneebar)	Kam Lung: Only The Strongest Survive 3	September 29, 2001	1	0:00	Rhoon, South Holland, Netherlands	
Win	3-5	Gideon Ackermans	TKO	FFH: Free Fight Explosion 1	May 27, 2001	0	0:00	Beverwijk, North Holland, Netherlands	
Loss	2-5	Richard Plug	Submission (armbar)	Together Productions: Fight Gala	March 24, 2001	0	0:00	Zaandam, North Holland, Netherlands	
Loss	2-4	Roberto Flamingo	Decision	Gym Alkmaar: Fight Gala	January 20, 2001	0	0:00	Schermerhorn, North Holland, Netherlands	
Loss	2-3	Roberto Flamingo	TKO (cut)	Kam Lung: Only the Strongest Survive 2	November 18, 2000	0	0:00	Hellevoetsluis, South Holland, Netherlands	
Win	2-2	Dave Dalgliesh	Decision (1-0 points)	Together Productions: Fight Gala	June 17, 2000	2	5:00	Zaandam, North Holland, Netherlands	
Loss	1-2	Wouter Bakker	Submission (keylock)	Rings Holland: Who's The Boss	June 7, 1998	1	0:34	Utrecht, Netherlands	
Win	1-1	Ronny Rivano	Decision (unanimous)	Rings Holland: Utrecht at War	June 29, 1997	2	5:00	Utrecht, Netherlands	
Loss	0-1	Ron van Gellekom	Decision (unanimous)	Rings Holland: The Final Challenge	February 2, 1997	1	10:00	Amsterdam, North Holland, Netherlands	

== See also ==
- List of male mixed martial artists
