= 1996 in Fighting Network Rings =

Mixed martial arts events

Information
- First date: January 24, 1996
- Last date: October 25, 1996

Events
- Total events: 4

Fights
- Total fights: 29

Chronology
1995 in RINGS	1996 in Fighting Network Rings	1997 in RINGS

The year 1996 is the second year in the history of Fighting Network Rings, a mixed martial arts promotion based in Japan. In 1996 Fighting Network Rings held four events beginning with, Rings: Budokan Hall 1996.

== Events list ==
#	Event title	Date	Arena	Location
7	Rings: Battle Dimensions Tournament 1996 Opening Round	October 25, 1996		
6	Rings: Maelstrom 6	August 24, 1996		Japan
5	Rings Holland: Kings of Martial Arts	February 18, 1996	Sport Hall Zuid	Amsterdam, North Holland, Netherlands
4	Rings: Budokan Hall 1996	January 24, 1996	Budokan Hall	Tokyo, Japan

== Rings: Budokan Hall 1996 ==
Rings: Budokan Hall 1996 was an event held on January 24, 1996, at Budokan Hall in Tokyo, Japan.

=== Results ===
Main Card
Weight class				Method	Round	Time	Notes
	Akira Maeda	def.	Yoshihisa Yamamoto	Submission
	Hans Nijman	def.	Magomedkhan Gamzatkhanov	TKO
	Tsuyoshi Kosaka	def.	Maurice Smith
	Mitsuya Nagai	def.	Tony Halme
	Chris Haseman	def.	Willie Peeters
	Mikhail Ilyukhin	def.	Wataru Sakata

== Rings Holland: Kings of Martial Arts ==
Rings Holland: Kings of Martial Arts was an event held on February 18, 1996, at Sport Hall Zuid in Amsterdam, North Holland, Netherlands.

=== Results ===
Main Card
Weight class				Method	Round	Time	Notes
	Dick Vrij	def.	Hubert Numrich	Submission (Forearm Choke)	1	1:48
	Lee Hasdell	vs.	Andre Mannaart	Draw	2	5:00
	Hans Nijman	def.	Allen Harris	Submission (Guillotine Choke)	2	1:30
	Bob Schrijber	def.	Emil Kristev	Submission (Guillotine Choke)	1	4:09
	Tsuyoshi Kosaka	def.	Willie Peeters	Submission (Rear-Naked Choke)	2	0:12
	Mitsuya Nagai	def.	Ruud Ewoldt	TKO (Retirement)	1	2:12
	Michael Tielrooy	def.	Edwin Gertenbach	KO (Palm Strike)	1	4:58
	Jimmy Portier	def.	John Benner	KO (Palm Strike)	1	2:15
	Valentijn Overeem	def.	Tjerk Vermanen	Submission (Rear-Naked Choke)	1	3:06

== Rings: Maelstrom 6 ==
Rings: Maelstrom 6 was an event held on August 24, 1996, in Japan.

=== Results ===
Main Card
Weight class				Method	Round	Time	Notes
	Ricardo Morais	def.	Yoshihisa Yamamoto	KO (Punches)	1	0:46
	Adilson Lima	def.	Mikhail Ilyukhin	Submission (Armbar)	1	24:52
	Magomedkhan Gamzatkhanov	def.	Tsuyoshi Kosaka	Submission (Armbar)	1	13:52
	Mitsuya Nagai	def.	Dick Vrij	Submission (Heel Hook)	1	6:16
	Kiyoshi Tamura	def.	Maurice Smith	Submission (Armbar)	1	10:58
	Masayuki Naruse	def.	Egan Inoue	Disqualification	1	11:51
	Willie Peeters	def.	Wataru Sakata	Submission (Neck Lock)	1	18:31

== Rings: Battle Dimensions Tournament 1996 Opening Round ==
Rings: Battle Dimensions Tournament 1996 Opening Round was an event held on October 25, 1996.

=== Results ===
Main Card
Weight class				Method	Round	Time	Notes
	Tariel Bitsadze	def.	Nikolai Zouev
	Tsuyoshi Kosaka	def.	Dick Vrij
	Magomedkhan Gamzatkhanov	def.	Masayuki Naruse
	Kiyoshi Tamura	def.	Mikhail Ilyukhin
	Mitsuya Nagai	def.	Willie Peeters
	Bakouri Gogitidze	def.	Todor Todorov
	Yoshihisa Yamamoto	def.	David Khakhaleishvili

== See also ==
- Fighting Network Rings
- List of Fighting Network Rings events
