= Chris Haseman =

Australian mixed martial arts fighter

- Born: 2 June 1969 (age 57); Brisbane, Queensland, Australia
- Other names: The Hammer
- Nationality: Australian
- Height: 5 ft 11 in (1.80 m)
- Weight: 205 lb (93 kg; 14 st 9 lb)
- Division: Light Heavyweight
- Reach: 74 in (188 cm)
- Stance: Orthodox
- Fighting out of: Stafford, Queensland, Australia
- Team: RINGS Australia
- Rank: Black Belt in Tohkon Ryu Ju-Jitsu
- Years active: 1996–2004, 2008–present

Mixed martial arts record
- Total: 37
- Wins: 20
- By knockout: 2
- By submission: 14
- By decision: 3
- Unknown: 1
- Losses: 17
- By knockout: 8
- By submission: 3
- By decision: 6

Other information
- Mixed martial arts record from Sherdog

Chris Haseman
Medal record

Submission Wrestling

ADCC World Championship
Bronze medal – third place	1999	-99kg

Chris Haseman (born 2 June 1969 in Brisbane, Queensland) is an Australian mixed martial artist. Haseman is currently signed with Fighting Network RINGS and is a longtime veteran of the promotion (1995–2012). Regarded as a pioneer of MMA in Australia he competed in Australia's first MMA show along with events such as the UFC and the World Fighting Alliance.

== Biography ==
=== Fighting Network RINGS ===
Coming from a background in Karate, Boxing, Wrestling, and Jujutsu, Haseman was signed up by RINGS as the head of their Australian branch. He had his debut in mixed martial arts outside the promotion, however, fighting Vale Tudo exponent Murilo Bustamante in Martial Arts Reality Superfighting. Although he lost by strikes in little more than a minute, his next bouts were more successful; taking part in Australia's Caged Combat 1 tournament, Haseman submitted two consecutive opponents by taking them down and ramming his chin into their eye sockets, and it took another vale tudo veteran, Mario Sperry, to knock him out.

After returning to RINGS, Haseman fought professional wrestler Alexander Otsuka and won by doctor stoppage after controlling the bout. He then participated in a February 1998 RINGS Holland event, where he fought Kickboxing and Sambo expert Valentijn Overeem to a decision that eventually went to the latter.

He also competed in ADCC Submission Wrestling World Championship, winning the bronze medal at the 1999 edition at +99 kg.

Haseman eventually was chosen to participate in RINGS's first world mixed martial arts tournament, King of Kings 1999. His opponent would be the renowned Japanese fighter Tsuyoshi Kohsaka, who came from fighting multiple bouts in Ultimate Fighting Championship. Haseman controlled the first round, executing repeated armlock attempts on a defensive Kohsaka, but the Australian was unable to finish him, and this carried to the second one, where Kohsaka took over the grappling exchanges. Entering the third round already tired, Haseman turtled down and continued fighting from the position, only for the Japanese to counter him and grind him with strikes. The match ended with Haseman defending a Guillotine Choke attempt, and it saw the judges eventually awarded the split decision to Kohsaka. Although eliminated from the tournament, Haseman won a bonus fight, submitting American wrestler Brad Kohler by armbar from the bottom in 1:11.

The rest of 2000 was an active year for Haseman as well, submitting most of his opponents and fighting to a decision with future UFC Welterweight Champion Matt Hughes. In September, he was defeated by fellow UFC champion Jeremy Horn for the first time Haseman fell on a submission move.

He returned at the next edition of King of Kings, being pitted first against Carlson Gracie trainee Carlos Barreto, who outweighed him by 30 pounds. The bout was primarily fought on the feet, with Barreto enjoying the reach advantage and cutting Haseman on his forehead with a punch, though also with Haseman returning the favor with a right hook that downed the Brazilian. In the end, Haseman won by unanimous decision after controlling the last round. Haseman next faced a professional wrestler Yoshihisa Yamamoto, but the match turned into an upset when the latter, who had been consistently dominated except by an armbar attempt, hit several glancing leg kicks that damaged Haseman's leg. Chris lost by KO and was eliminated.

Haseman later competed at the RINGS 2001 Middleweight Championship Tournament, where he choked out famous ADCC competitor Alexandre "Cacareco" Ferreira before falling to Gustavo Machado. His last bout in RINGS would be against Fedor Emelianenko.

=== Late career ===
Chris later competed against Evan Tanner and retired after losing to Canadian Bill Mahood in Spartan Reality Fight series 9 in 2004. Four years later in 2008, he returned to the sport and earned an 18-second knockout win over Japanese Yuji Hisamatsu.

Haseman was scheduled to return to the octagon in 2010 for a rematch against Elvis Sinosic at UFC 110, the first UFC event to be held in Australia. However, just a day before the fight, Sinosic was forced to withdraw with a shoulder injury.

== Championships and accomplishments ==
- Fighting Network RINGS
  - 1997 Light Heavyweight Championship Tournament Runner Up
  - 2000 Rising Stars Middleweight Tournament Runner Up
  - 2001 Middleweight Championship Tournament Semifinalist
  - 2001 Absolute Class Tournament Runner Up
- Ultimate Caged Combat
  - 1997 Caged Combat 1 Tournament Runner Up
- ADCC Submission Wrestling World Championships
  - ADCC 1999 +99 kg third place

== Mixed martial arts record ==
Professional record breakdown
37 matches	20 wins	17 losses
By knockout	2	8
By submission	14	3
By decision	3	6
Unknown	1	0

Res.	Record	Opponent	Method	Event	Date	Round	Time	Location	Notes
Loss	20–17	Gennadiy Kovalev	TKO (punches)	Rings – Reincarnation	9 March 2012	2	0:28	Tokyo, Japan	
Win	20–16	Yuji Hisamatsu	KO (spinning back kick)	FWC 1: Return of the Hammer	15 November 2008	1	0:18	Australia	
Loss	19–16	Bill Mahood	TKO (corner stoppage)	Spartan Reality Fight 9	3 April 2004	3	1:16	Australia	
Loss	19–15	Akihiro Gono	Decision (majority)	ZST 2 – The Battle Field 2	9 March 2003	3	5:00	Tokyo, Japan	
Loss	19–14	Mike van Arsdale	TKO (strikes)	WFA 3: Level 3	23 November 2002	2	3:10	Nevada, United States	
Loss	19–13	Evan Tanner	Decision (unanimous)	UFC 38	13 July 2002	3	5:00	England	
Win	19–12	Yukiyasu Ozawa	Submission (Kimura)	Premium Challenge	6 May 2002	1	6:24	Tokyo, Japan	
Loss	18–12	Fedor Emelianenko	TKO (strikes)	Rings: World Title Series Grand Final	15 February 2002	1	2:50	Yokohama, Japan	RINGS 2001 Absolute Class Tournament Finals
Win	18–11	Egidijus Valavicius	Submission (armbar)	Rings: World Title Series 5	21 December 2001	1	3:08	Yokohama, Japan	RINGS 2001 Absolute Class Tournament Semifinals
Win	17–11	Koba Tkeshelashvili	Decision (unanimous)	Rings: World Title Series 4	20 October 2001	3	5:00	Tokyo, Japan	RINGS 2001 Absolute Class Tournament First Round
Loss	16–11	Gustavo Machado	Decision (unanimous)	Rings: 10th Anniversary	11 August 2001	3	5:00	Tokyo, Japan	RINGS 2001 Middleweight Championship Tournament Semifinals
Win	16–10	Alexandre Ferreira	Submission (guillotine choke)	Rings: World Title Series 2	15 June 2001	1	3:03	Yokohama, Japan	RINGS 2001 Middleweight Championship Tournament First Round
Loss	15–10	Yoshihisa Yamamoto	TKO (strikes)	Rings: King of Kings 2000 Block B	22 December 2000	1	3:51	Osaka, Japan	
Win	15–9	Carlos Barreto	Decision (unanimous)	Rings: King of Kings 2000 Block B	22 December 2000	2	5:00	Osaka, Japan	
Win	14–9	Joe Slick	Decision	Rings Australia: Free Fight Battle	12 November 2000	1	10:00	Australia	
Loss	13–9	Jeremy Horn	Submission (armbar)	Rings USA: Rising Stars Final	30 September 2000	1	2:36	Illinois, United States	RINGS 2000 Rising Stars Middleweight Tournament Finals
Win	13–8	Yasuhito Namekawa	Submission (Kimura)	Rings USA: Rising Stars Final	30 September 2000	1	1:30	Illinois, United States	RINGS 2000 Rising Stars Middleweight Tournament Semifinals
Loss	12–8	Matt Hughes	Decision (unanimous)	Rings: Millennium Combine 3	23 August 2000	2	5:00	Osaka, Japan	
Win	12–7	Jermaine Andre	Submission (toe hold)	Rings USA: Rising Stars Block A	15 July 2000	1	1:23	Utah, United States	RINGS 2000 Rising Stars Middleweight Tournament Quarterfinals
Win	11–7	Matt Frost	Submission (armbar)	Rings USA: Rising Stars Block A	15 July 2000	1	0:30	Utah, United States	RINGS 2000 Rising Stars Middleweight Tournament First Round
Loss	10–7	Iouri Bekichev	KO (punch)	Rings Russia: Russia vs. The World	20 May 2000	1	2:30	Ekaterinburg, Russia	
Win	10–6	Yasuhito Namekawa	Submission (guillotine choke)	Rings Australia: NR 4	19 March 2000	1	6:50	Australia	
Win	9–6	Brad Kohler	Submission (Kimura)	Rings: King of Kings 1999 Final	26 February 2000	1	1:11	Tokyo, Japan	
Loss	8–6	Tsuyoshi Kohsaka	Decision (split)	Rings: King of Kings 1999 Block B	22 December 1999	3	5:00	Osaka, Japan	
Win	8–5	Willie Peeters	Submission (kneebar)	Rings: Rise 5th	19 August 1999	1	3:13	Japan	
Win	7–5	Masayuki Naruse	Submission (Kimura)	Rings: Rise 2nd	23 April 1999	1	8:18	Japan	
Win	6–5	Yasuhito Namekawa	Submission (arm-triangle choke)	Rings: Rise 1st	20 March 1999	1	7:42	Japan	
Win	5–5	Dick Vrij	Submission (rear-naked choke)	Rings Australia: NR 3	7 March 1999	1	5:17	Australia	
Loss	4–5	Kenichi Yamamoto	Submission	Rings: Third Fighting Integration	29 May 1998	1	12:39	Tokyo, Japan	
Loss	4–4	Valentijn Overeem	Decision (unanimous)	Rings Holland: The King of Rings	8 February 1998	2	5:00	Netherlands	
Loss	4–3	Mitsuya Nagai	Submission (heel hook)	Rings – Mega Battle Tournament 1997 Semifinal 1	25 October 1997	1	9:18	Japan	
Win	4–2	Alexander Otsuka	TKO (doctor stoppage from a cut)	Rings – Extension Fighting 2	22 April 1997	1	7:03	Japan	
Loss	3–2	Mario Sperry	TKO (submission to strikes)	Caged Combat 1	22 March 1997	1	1:12	Australia	Caged Combat 1 Finals
Win	3–1	Elvis Sinosic	Submission (chin to the eye)	Caged Combat 1	22 March 1997	1	2:47	Australia	Caged Combat 1 Semifinals
Win	2–1	Hiriwa Te Rangi	Submission (chin to the eye)	Caged Combat 1: Australian Ultimate Fighting	22 March 1997	1	0:55	Australia	Caged Combat 1 First Round
Loss	1–1	Murilo Bustamante	TKO (corner stoppage)	MARS: Martial Arts Reality Superfighting	22 November 1996	1	1:01	Alabama, United States	
Win	1–0	Willie Peeters	N/A	RINGS: Budokan Hall 1996	24 January 1996	N/A		Tokyo, Japan	

== Submission grappling record ==
? Matches, ? Wins, ? Losses, ? Draws
Result	Rec.	Opponent	Method	Event	Date	Location
Win	2–2–0	(Brazil) Luis Roberto Duarte	Decision · Points	1999 ADCC World Championships	February 24, 1999	Abu Dhabi, United Arab Emirates
Loss	1–2–0	(United States) Mark Kerr	Decision · Points	1999 ADCC World Championships	February 24, 1999	Abu Dhabi, United Arab Emirates
Loss	1–1–0	(Brazil) Ricardo Morais	Decision · Points	1999 ADCC World Championships	February 24, 1999	Abu Dhabi, United Arab Emirates
Win	1–0–0	(United States) Gary Myers	Decision · Points	1999 ADCC World Championships	February 24, 1999	Abu Dhabi, United Arab Emirates
