= 1997 in Fighting Network Rings =

Mixed martial arts events

Information
- First date: January 1, 1997
- Last date: December 23, 1997

Events
- Total events: 9

Fights
- Total fights: 51

Chronology
| 1996 in RINGS | 1997 in Fighting Network Rings | 1998 in RINGS |

The year 1997 is the third year in the history of Fighting Network Rings, a mixed martial arts promotion based in Japan. In 1997, Fighting Network Rings held nine events beginning with, Rings: Battle Dimensions Tournament 1996 Final.

== Events list ==
| # | Event title | Date | Arena | Location |
|---|---|---|---|---|
| 16 | Rings: Mega Battle Tournament 1997 Semifinal | December 23, 1997 | | Japan |
| 15 | Rings: Mega Battle Tournament 1997 Semifinal 1 | October 25, 1997 | | Japan |
| 14 | Rings: Extension Fighting 7 | September 26, 1997 | | Japan |
| 13 | Rings Holland: Utrecht at War | June 29, 1997 | Vechtsebanen Sport Hall | Utrecht, Netherlands |
| 12 | Rings: Extension Fighting 4 | June 21, 1997 | Ariake Coliseum | Tokyo, Japan |
| 11 | Rings: Extension Fighting 2 | April 22, 1997 | | Japan |
| 10 | Rings Holland: The Final Challenge | February 2, 1997 | Sport Hall Zuid | Amsterdam, North Holland, Netherlands |
| 9 | Rings: Budokan Hall 1997 | January 22, 1997 | Budokan Hall | Tokyo, Japan |
| 8 | Rings: Battle Dimensions Tournament 1996 Final | January 1, 1997 | | |

== Rings: Battle Dimensions Tournament 1996 Final ==
Rings: Battle Dimensions Tournament 1996 Final was an event held on January 1, 1997.

=== Results ===
Main Card
| Weight class | | | | Method | Round | Time | Notes |
|---|---|---|---|---|---|---|---|
| | Magomedkhan Gamzatkhanov | def. | Kiyoshi Tamura | | 0 | 0:00 |
| | Tariel Bitsadze | def. | Yoshihisa Yamamoto | | 0 | 0:00 |
| | Magomedkhan Gamzatkhanov | def. | Tariel Bitsadze | | 0 | 0:00 |
| | Kiyoshi Tamura | def. | Yoshihisa Yamamoto | | 0 | 0:00 |
| | Tariel Bitsadze | def. | Hans Nijman | | 0 | 0:00 |
| | Magomedkhan Gamzatkhanov | def. | Tsuyoshi Kosaka | | 0 | 0:00 |
| | Kiyoshi Tamura | def. | Mitsuya Nagai | | 0 | 0:00 |
| | Yoshihisa Yamamoto | def. | Bakouri Gogitidze | | 0 | 0:00 |

== Rings: Budokan Hall 1997 ==
Rings: Budokan Hall 1997 was an event held on January 22, 1997, at Budokan Hall in Tokyo, Japan.

=== Results ===
Main Card
| Weight class | | | | Method | Round | Time | Notes |
|---|---|---|---|---|---|---|---|
| | Magomedkhan Gamzatkhanov | def. | Kiyoshi Tamura | | 0 | 0:00 |
| | Tariel Bitsadze | def. | Yoshihisa Yamamoto | | 0 | 0:00 |
| | Akira Maeda | def. | Maurice Smith | | 0 | 0:00 |
| | Nikolai Zouev | def. | Mitsuya Nagai | | 0 | 0:00 |
| | Tsuyoshi Kosaka | def. | Mikhail Ilyukhin | | 0 | 0:00 |
| | Zaza Tkeshelashvili | def. | Masayuki Naruse | | 0 | 0:00 |
| | Wataru Sakata | def. | Sean McCully | | 0 | 0:00 |

== Rings Holland: The Final Challenge ==
Rings Holland: The Final Challenge was an event held on February 2, 1997, at The Sport Hall Zuid in Amsterdam, North Holland, Netherlands.

=== Results ===
Main Card
| Weight class | | | | Method | Round | Time | Notes |
|---|---|---|---|---|---|---|---|
| | Rob Van Esdonk | def. | Dennis Crouweel | TKO (Referee Stoppage from a Broken Nose) | 1 | 2:38 |
| | Pedro Palm | vs. | Dick Vrij | No Contest | 1 | 1:00 |
| | Bob Schrijber | def. | Toon Stelling | TKO (Punches) | 1 | 6:01 |
| | Kiyoshi Tamura | def. | Andre Mannaart | Submission (Rear Naked Choke) | 1 | 2:11 |
| | Joop Kasteel | def. | Mitsuya Nagai | KO (Punches) | 1 | 5:12 |
| | Valentijn Overeem | def. | Masayuki Naruse | TKO (Cut) | 1 | 3:58 |
| | Willie Peeters | def. | Sergei Sousserov | KO (Palm Strikes) | 1 | 4:51 |
| | Peter Dijkman | def. | Iouri Bekichev | Submission (Rear Naked Choke) | 1 | 2:25 |
| | Hans Nijman | def. | Lee Hasdell | Submission (Guillotine Choke) | 1 | 5:35 |
| | Gilbert Yvel | def. | Rob van Leeuwen | TKO (Corner Stoppage) | 1 | 4:06 |
| | Ron van Gellekom | def. | Jonny van Wanrooy | Decision (Unanimous) | 1 | 10:00 |

== Rings: Extension Fighting 2 ==
Rings: Extension Fighting 2 was an event held on April 22, 1997, in Japan.

=== Results ===
Main Card
| Weight class | | | | Method | Round | Time | Notes |
|---|---|---|---|---|---|---|---|
| | Kiyoshi Tamura | def. | Tsuyoshi Kosaka | Submission (Toe Hold) | 1 | 13:57 |
| | Chris Haseman | def. | Alexander Otsuka | TKO (Doctor Stoppage from a Cut) | 1 | 7:03 |
| | Joop Kasteel | def. | Mitsuya Nagai | TKO (Lost Points) | 1 | 6:27 |
| | Yoshihisa Yamamoto | def. | Masayuki Naruse | Submission (Arm Bar) | 1 | 21:20 |
| | Dick Vrij | def. | Tony Halme | TKO (Doctor Stoppage) | 1 | 2:42 |
| | Magomedkhan Gamzatkhanov | def. | Akira Maeda | Submission (Leg Lock) | 1 | 8:47 |

== Rings: Extension Fighting 4 ==
Rings: Extension Fighting 4 was an event held on June 21, 1997, in Tokyo, Japan.

=== Results ===
Main Card
| Weight class | | | | Method | Round | Time | Notes |
|---|---|---|---|---|---|---|---|
| | Adilson Lima | def. | Alexander Fedorov | | 1 | 10:10 |
| | Yuriy Kochkine | vs. | Ricardo Morais | Draw | 1 | 20:00 |

== Rings Holland: Utrecht at War ==
Rings Holland: Utrecht at War was an event held on June 29, 1997, in Utrecht, Netherlands.

=== Results ===
Main Card
| Weight class | | | | Method | Round | Time | Notes |
|---|---|---|---|---|---|---|---|
| | Toon Stelling | def. | Andre Mannaart | Decision (Unanimous) | 2 | 5:00 |
| | Valentijn Overeem | def. | Cees Bezems | Submission (Heel Hook) | 1 | 0:49 |
| | Joop Kasteel | def. | Pedro Palm | KO (Palm Strikes) | 1 | 4:17 |
| | Sander Thonhauser | def. | Gerard Benschop | KO (Palm Strikes) | 1 | 3:04 |
| | Sander MacKilljan | def. | Erwin van de Eijnden | Submission (Rear Naked Choke) | 1 | 1:46 |
| | Gilbert Yvel | def. | Leon van Dijk | KO (Knee) | 1 | 2:05 |
| | Mario Borzic | def. | Michael Jonker | TKO (Knee) | 1 | 0:00 |
| | Rodney Glunder | def. | Rik de Jager | KO (Knee to the Body) | 2 | 1:10 |
| | Jonny van Wanrooy | def. | Ronny Rivano | Decision (Unanimous) | 2 | 5:00 |

== Rings: Extension Fighting 7 ==
Rings: Extension Fighting 7 was an event held on September 26, 1997, in Japan.

=== Results ===
Main Card
| Weight class | | | | Method | Round | Time | Notes |
|---|---|---|---|---|---|---|---|
| | Kiyoshi Tamura | def. | Magomedkhan Gamzatkhanov | Submission (Arm Bar) | 1 | 12:48 |
| | Akira Maeda | def. | Andrei Kopylov | Submission (Rear Naked Choke) | 1 | 8:32 |
| | Frank Shamrock | def. | Tsuyoshi Kosaka | Decision | 1 | 30:00 |
| | Wataru Sakata | def. | Valentijn Overeem | Submission (Ankle Lock) | 1 | 2:16 |
| | Pete Williams | def. | Joop Kasteel | TKO (Knee Injury) | 1 | 8:25 |
| | Yuriy Kochkine | def. | Malcolm Nay | Submission (Achilles Lock) | 1 | 4:33 |

== Rings: Mega Battle Tournament 1997 Semifinal 1 ==
Rings: Mega Battle Tournament 1997 Semifinal was an event held on October 25, 1997, in Japan.

=== Results ===
Main Card
| Weight class | | | | Method | Round | Time | Notes |
|---|---|---|---|---|---|---|---|
| | Dick Vrij | def. | Tariel Bitsadze | Submission (Rear Naked Choke) | 1 | 6:07 |
| | Kiyoshi Tamura | def. | Hans Nijman | Submission (Arm Lock) | 1 | 10:34 |
| | Tsuyoshi Kosaka | def. | Borislav Jeliazkov | Decision (Lost Points) | 1 | 0:00 |
| | Mikhail Ilyukhin | def. | Masayuki Naruse | Submission (Ankle Lock) | 1 | 12:28 |
| | Mitsuya Nagai | def. | Chris Haseman | Submission (Heel Hook) | 1 | 9:18 |
| | Joop Kasteel | def. | Lee Hasdell | Submission (Headlock) | 1 | 8:55 |
| | Magomedkhan Gamzatkhanov | def. | Andrei Kopylov | Submission | 1 | 10:52 |
| | Akira Maeda | def. | Nikolai Zouev | Submission (Rear Naked Choke) | 1 | 5:17 |

== Rings: Mega Battle Tournament 1997 Semifinal ==
Rings: Mega Battle Tournament 1997 Semifinal was an event held on December 23, 1997, in Japan.

=== Results ===
Main Card
| Weight class | | | | Method | Round | Time | Notes |
|---|---|---|---|---|---|---|---|
| | Zaza Tkeshelashvili | def. | Ricardo Morais | Decision | 1 | 20:00 |
| | Sean Alvarez | def. | Willie Peeters | | 1 | 9:40 |

== See also ==
- Fighting Network Rings
- List of Fighting Network Rings events
