= Volk Han =

Russian wrestler and MMA fighter (born 1961)

Magomedkhan Gamzatkhanov Магомедхан Гамзатханов
- Born: April 15, 1961 (age 65); Anchik, Dagestan ASSR, Russian SFSR, Soviet Union (now Russia)
- Other names: Volk Han
- Height: 6 ft 3 in (1.91 m)
- Weight: 235 lb (107 kg; 16.8 st)
- Division: Heavyweight
- Style: Sambo
- Stance: Orthodox
- Fighting out of: Tula, Russia
- Team: Russian Top Team; RusFighters Sport Club
- Years active: Professional Wrestling: 1991–1994, 1995–1999, (Note: Before adoption of "KOK rules" in 1999/2000, there are a possibility that matches between 1995 and 1999 in RINGS might be fixed / worked, as RINGS began transitioning to MMA from U-Kei Pro Wrestling in 1995. At the moment, it is not known what during the 1995-1999 period was actually competitive MMA or shoot style pro wrestling. Regardless many fights during the 1995-1999 period are listed on official MMA records. His entire RINGS record - with pro wrestling bouts counted - is W97-L13.) 2001; MMA: 1995–1999, 2000–2001, 2012

Mixed martial arts record
- Total: 30
- Wins: 22
- By knockout: 1
- By submission: 11
- By decision: 3
- Unknown: 7
- Losses: 8
- By knockout: 2
- By submission: 3
- By decision: 2
- Unknown: 1

Other information
- Notable students: Fedor Emelianenko, Karimula Barkalaev
- Mixed martial arts record from Sherdog

Magomedkhan Amanulayevich Gamzatkhanov (Russian: Магомедха́н Аманула́евич Гамзатха́нов; born 15 April 1961), is a Russian retired mixed martial artist, professional wrestler, sambo wrestler and former military officer of Avar descent. Gamzatkhanov is better known by his ringname Volk Han (Russian: Волк-хан, Japanese: ヴォルク・ハン) and is renowned for his technical mastery of sambo.

Gamzatkhanov represented Russia on the Russian Fighting Network RINGS team with Fedor Emelianenko, Andrei Kopylov, Nikolai Zouev and Mikhail Ilyukhin. In the early 1990s Han opened his own martial arts academy, which taught a derivative of combat sambo with special emphasis on flying and spinning joint locks and compression locks applied to upper and lower extremities.

During his tenure in RINGS, Han was considered the promotion's top foreign star and impacted the popularity of martial art Sambo Japan. According to MMA ranking system portal Fight Matrix, Magomedkhan Gamzatkhanov was ranked the #10 Heavyweight of 1997.

== Sambo career ==
Magomedkhan was born on 15 April 1961, in the village in the Anchik, Akhvakhsky District of the Dagestan Autonomous Soviet Socialist Republic. He is of Karata ethnicity and was the third child in the family.

Gamzatkhanov started training Freestyle Wrestling while at boarding school. After learning in several teams, his friend Ahmed Sharipov introduced him to the five-time world champion Ali Aliyev, who accepted to train him. Under his tutelage, Gamzatkhanov won the Nalchik regional championship in 1979. He also won the USSR junior championship two years back to back, and placed fourth in the international Aliyev Cup. In 1981, upon beginning his two-year service in the USSR military, Han switched to Sambo, and was immediately scouted by Viktor Lysenko for his team in Tula.

In 1984, Gamzatkhanov attended the Police Academy in Moscow. A year later, he competed in the USSR sambo championship and placed second after losing in the finals to the legendary Alexander Pushnitsa. However, he bounced back by winning the gold medal at the openweight division in 1985, as well as the first place in the USSR championships of 1987 and 1988. He also won the Kalinin international tournament, reserved to the highest practitioners of the sport. In 1991, Gamzatkhanov returned to the USSR championship, but he was again eliminated from the finals, this time by Murat Khasanov.

The same year, he was scouted by Akira Maeda for his professional wrestling promotion Fighting Network RINGS, where he was given the ring name of Volk Han ("Volk" meaning "wolf" and "Han" being short for Magomedkhan).

== Professional wrestling career ==
In 1991, shortly after the launch of the Japanese martial arts group Rings, he was scouted by Akira Maeda, the presiding officer, and made his debut in Japan at the fourth Rings tournament held on 7 December, the same year. In 1992, Han participated in RINGS's Mega Battle Tournament, but he was eliminated on the first round by Akira Maeda. Despite his loss, the match turned him into an instant fan favourite thanks to his spectacular grappling techniques and charisma, which saw him becoming one of RINGS's main players. In particular, the speed of drawing into the technique in an instant from the unique interval of the heyday and the high accuracy of the technique made the name as a "rare immovable technician".

In addition to the "Russian wolf" associated with his ring name, he was nicknamed "Magician" because of his unique appearance and submission that was described as "like a magic trick." However, he is also good at magic tricks, and when he appeared in a promotion for "Waratte Iitomo!", He showed himself magic tricks. Other than that, outside the ring, he makes jokes and invites laughter to reporters, showing a different side from the image that seems to be cold in the ring.

The next year, after several wins against names like Chris Dolman, Mitsuya Nagai and Willie Williams, Han took part in the next edition, eliminating Masayuki Naruse in the opening round before falling to teammate Nikolai Zouev in the second. Han and Zouev started a heated feud focused around their sambo backgrounds, and it saw Zouev besting Han again in a special sambo jacket match. 1994 was Han's breakout year, as he won the next edition of the Mega Battle Tournament by submitting Williams, Maeda and Hans Nijman, as well as getting his revenge against Zouev in a singles match.

After a lesser but notable participation in the 1995 tournament, in which he was eliminated by Maeda in the semifinals, Han won the 1996 iteration by defeating Naruse, Tsuyoshi Kohsaka, Tariel Bitsadze and Kiyoshi Tamura. Following an elimination from the 1996 to hands of his own apprentice, Mikhail Illyukhin, Han gave his last great tournament participation in the 1999 edition, which was fought in team format. His team, composed by RINGS Russia members Illyukhin, Sergei Sousserov and Han himself, was pitted against RINGS Holland, formed by Joop Kasteel, Hans Nijman and Dick Vrij. Despite their effort, RINGS Russia was eliminated. Han's last professional wrestling match in RINGS was in 2001, facing legendary catch wrestling expert Yoshiaki Fujiwara in a special match that ended in a draw.

== Mixed martial arts career ==
After years competing in shoot style professional wrestling and occasional shoot fights, Han switched to mixed martial arts when RINGS adopted the King of Kings (KOK) format in 1999, thus fully transitioning to an MMA promotion. By this time, Han was considered past his athletic prime. Despite this, Han amassed an impressive 8–1 record under RINGS KOK rules.

Following a winning debut against RINGS rookie Yasuhito Namekawa, Volk's skills were proven further against American wrestler and Mark Coleman's teammate Branden Lee Hinkle, 12 years his junior. Although Hinkle was able to take Han down and control him, the Russian grappler locked a tight triangle armbar at the end of the first round and made him tap out. Han got a matchup closer in age and experience against Olympic freestyle alumni Zaza Tkeshelashvili in a special Russia vs Georgia fight, but again Han won by submission with a guillotine choke.

In December, Han took part in the King of Kings tournament, where he was pitted in the first round against RINGS England leader Lee Hasdell. The Russian took him down and landed effective strikes before securing position, and also attempted triangle chokes and armbars, but Hasdell's defense was strong. Han resumed using unorthodox ground and pound from the knee-on-stomach position every time the fight hit the ground, but it was in a standing segment where he got the finish, overpowering the British kickboxer with combinations and injuring Hasdell's eye for a TKO victory. In the second round, Volk fought Bobby Hoffman, who came to the bout with a 23–4 record. Hoffman controlled Han for the majority of the fight and tried to perform ground and pound, while Han worked in avoiding damage from the bottom. However, once in overtime, Han took Hoffman down in the corner and stood over him landing punches until the end of the time, winning the decision.

During the semifinals, Han met young star Antônio Rodrigo Nogueira, expert in Brazilian jiu-jitsu and almost half of Volk's age. Despite his disadvantages, the Russian grappler was successful in stopping Nogueira from attempting submissions, even although Nogueira passed his guard and took his back at the end of the first round. When the second round arrived, Han sprawled a takedown and gained his signature knee-on-stomach control, with the Brazilian coming back with a kneebar; the hold was completely extended, but Volk shockingly escaped. After a restart, Han came attacking with a flying Kimura lock which Nogueira answered with an omoplata/ankle hold combination, but he was unable to submit Volk, and the match ended shortly after. Nogueira was given the unanimous decision, eliminating Han from the tournament.

He has been out of competition since February 2002, but will return at the Lithuanian Bushido Association (Lithuania Bushido) convention on 20 November 2004. When Sergei Kharitonov participated in HERO'S on 17 September 2007, he participated as Han's team (CLUB VOLK HAN), and Han himself came to Japan.

== Martial arts instruction ==
Volk Han has served as the head instructor of the Russian Top Ten team for years, alongside Andrei Kopylov, and has coached names like Fedor and Alexander Emelianenko, Sergei Kharitonov, Karimula Barkalaev and two-time world sambo champion Suren Balachinskiy. After the departure of Fedor from RTT, it became public that Han was no longer on good terms with him, although Emelianenko still considers him one of the best in his field.

== After martial arts competition ==
Other than martial arts, he ran for parliamentary elections in his home country without success. After that, the Russian media was crowded with scandals related to his business.

He also helped in building a mosque in his homeland, the Republic of Dagestan, with the fight money he earned from his RINGS career.

He has been away from the competition since February 2002, but made a brief return at the Lithuanian Bushido Association (Lithuania Bushido) tournament on 20 November 2004.

Currently, he runs a martial arts dojo in his home-town of Tula.

His son, Dzhamal Gamzatkhanov, is a judoka and ranked third in the 2018 World Junior 100 kg class.

== In popular culture ==
Volk Han is credited into bringing martial art Sambo into Japanese popular consciousness. In fighting games, Volk Han's brand of Command Sambo or Commando Sambo is used by various fictional characters, including Blue Mary from SNK's Fatal Fury and King of Fighters series, Bayman from Dead or Alive series and Dragunov from the Tekken series.

Volk Han himself has become a model for many fictitious sambo practitioners in popular media, including Heizo Onikawa from the manga "Tough", Wolf from video game "Battle K-Road" and Preston Ajax from video game Fighting Layer.

== Championships and accomplishments ==
- Fighting Network Rings
  - 1994 Mega Battle Tournament Winner
  - 1996 Mega Battle Tournament Winner
  - 1995 Mega Battle Tournament Semi-Finalist
  - 1997 Mega Battle Tournament Semi-Finalist
- Pro Wrestling Illustrated
  - PWI ranked him #129 of the top 500 singles wrestlers of the "PWI Years" in 2003
- Fight Matrix
  - Highest Quarterly Ranking: 7/01/1997, #6 Heavyweight

== Mixed martial arts record ==
Volk Han's Mixed Martial Arts record.

Professional record breakdown
31 matches	22 wins	8 losses
By knockout	1	2
By submission	11	3
By decision	3	2
Unknown	7	1
Draws	1	

Res.	Record	Opponent	Method	Event	Date	Round	Time	Location	Notes
Draw	22–8–1	Masakatsu Funaki	Draw (majority)	Rings/The Outsider: Volk Han Retirement Match	16 December 2012	1	15:00	Tokyo, Japan	Retirement match.
Win	22–8	Zaza Tkeshelashvili	Submission (armlock)	Rings Lithuania: Bushido Rings 2	8 May 2001	1	N/A	Vilnius, Lithuania	RINGS KOK Rules
Win	21–8	Andrei Kopylov	Decision (unanimous)	Rings Russia: Russia vs. Bulgaria	6 April 2001	2	5:00	Ekaterinburg, Russia	RINGS KOK Rules
Loss	20–8	Antônio Rodrigo Nogueira	Decision (unanimous)	Rings: King of Kings 2000 Final	24 February 2001	2	5:00	Tokyo, Japan	RINGS KOK Rules
Win	20–7	Bobby Hoffman	Decision (unanimous)	Rings: King of Kings 2000 Block B	22 December 2000	3	5:00	Osaka, Japan	RINGS KOK Rules
Win	19–7	Lee Hasdell	TKO (punches)	Rings: King of Kings 2000 Block B	22 December 2000	2	0:08	Osaka, Japan	RINGS KOK Rules
Win	18–7	Zaza Tkeshelashvili	Submission (guillotine choke)	Rings: Russia vs. Georgia	16 August 2000	1	15:46	Tula, Russia	RINGS KOK Rules
Win	17–7	Branden Lee Hinkle	Submission (triangle armbar)	Rings: Millennium Combine 2	15 June 2000	1	8:11	Tokyo, Japan	RINGS KOK Rules
Win	16–7	Cvetko Cvetkov	Submission (achilles lock)	Rings Russia: Russia vs. Bulgaria	21 May 2000	1	N/A	Tula, Russia	RINGS KOK Rules
Win	15–7	Yasuhito Namekawa	Decision (unanimous)	Rings Russia: Russia vs. The World	21 May 2000	3	5:00	Yekaterinburg, Russia	RINGS KOK Rules
Loss	14–7	Zaza Tkeshelashvili	KO	Rings: Rings Georgia	8 October 1999	1	7:08	Georgia (country)	
Loss	14–6	Zaza Tkeshelashvili	Decision (unanimous)	Rings: Rise 4th	24 June 1999	3	10:00	Japan	
Win	14–5	Masayuki Naruse	Submission (armbar)	Rings: Rise 3rd	22 May 1999	1	4:26	Japan	
Win	13–5	Nikolai Zuyev	Submission (arm-triangle choke)	Rings: Final Capture	21 February 1999	1	4:49	Japan	
Loss	12–5	Tsuyoshi Kohsaka	Submission (injury)	Rings: Third Fighting Integration	29 May 1998	1	10:10	Tokyo, Japan	
Loss	12–4	Akira Maeda	Submission (verbal)	Rings: Battle Dimensions Tournament 1997 Final	21 January 1998	1	4:24	N/A	
Loss	12–3	Mikhail Ilyukhin	N/A	Rings: Battle Dimensions Tournament 1997 Final	21 January 1998	N/A	N/A	N/A	
Win	12–2	Dick Vrij	N/A	Rings: Battle Dimensions Tournament 1997 Final	21 January 1998	N/A	N/A	N/A	
Win	11–2	Andrei Kopylov	Submission (armlock)	Rings – Mega Battle Tournament 1997 Semifinal 1	25 October 1997	1	10:52	Japan	
Loss	10–2	Kiyoshi Tamura	Submission (armbar)	Rings – Extension Fighting 7	26 September 1997	1	12:48	Japan	
Win	10–1	Akira Maeda	Submission (kneebar)	Rings – Extension Fighting 2	22 April 1997	1	8:47	Japan	
Win	9–1	Kiyoshi Tamura	N/A	Rings – Budokan Hall 1997	22 January 1997	N/A	N/A	Tokyo, Japan	
Win	8–1	Kiyoshi Tamura	N/A	Rings – Battle Dimensions Tournament 1996 Final	1 January 1997	N/A	N/A	N/A	
Win	7–1	Tariel Bitsadze	N/A	Rings – Battle Dimensions Tournament 1996 Final	1 January 1997	N/A	N/A	N/A	
Win	6–1	Tsuyoshi Kohsaka	N/A	Rings – Battle Dimensions Tournament 1996 Final	1 January 1997	N/A	N/A	N/A	
Win	5–1	Masayuki Naruse	N/A	Rings – Battle Dimensions Tournament 1996 Opening Round	25 October 1996	N/A	N/A	N/A	
Win	4–1	Tsuyoshi Kohsaka	Submission (armbar)	Rings – Maelstrom 6	24 August 1996	1	13:52	Japan	
Win	3–1	Mitsuya Nagai	Submission (rear naked choke)	Rings - Maelstrom 4	29 June 1996	1	11:47	Tokyo, Japan	
Loss	2–1	Hans Nijman	TKO	Rings – Budokan Hall 1996	24 January 1996	N/A	N/A	Tokyo, Japan	
Win	2–0	Peter Ura	Submission (kneebar)	Rings – Battle Dimensions Tournament 1995 Opening Round	21 October 1995	N/A	N/A	N/A	
Win	1–0	Akira Maeda	Submission	Rings – Budokan Hall 1995	25 January 1995	N/A	N/A	Tokyo, Japan	
