= Herman Renting =

Dutch mixed martial arts fighter

- Born: 31 December 1969 (age 56); Netherlands
- Nationality: Dutch
- Height: 6 ft 0 in (1.83 m)
- Weight: 215 lb (98 kg; 15.4 st)
- Division: Heavyweight
- Style: Kickboxing, Sambo
- Team: Dolman Gym; Rings Holland
- Years active: 1995 - 2001

Mixed martial arts record
- Total: 4
- Wins: 1
- By decision: 1
- Losses: 3
- By submission: 1
- By decision: 1
- Unknown: 1

Other information
- Mixed martial arts record from Sherdog

Herman Renting (born December 31, 1969) is a Dutch mixed martial artist. He competed in the Heavyweight division.

== Mixed martial arts record ==
Professional record breakdown
4 matches	1 win	3 losses
By submission	0	1
By decision	1	1
Unknown	0	1

Res.	Record	Opponent	Method	Event	Date	Round	Time	Location	Notes
Loss	1–3	Piet van Gammeren	Decision (unanimous)	Rings Holland: Heroes Live Forever	28 January 2001	2	5:00	Utrecht, Netherlands	
Loss	1–2	Akira Shoji	Submission (armbar)	Pride 11 - Battle of the Rising Sun	31 October 2000	1	3:48	Osaka, Japan	
Win	1–1	David Levicki	Decision (unanimous)	Rings Holland: Free Fight	19 February 1995	1	10:00	Amsterdam, North Holland, Netherlands	
Loss	0–1	David Khakhaleishvili	N/A	Rings: Budokan Hall 1995	25 January 1995	0	0:00	Tokyo, Japan	

== See also ==
- List of male mixed martial artists
