= Ameran Bitsadze =

Georgian mixed martial artist

- Born: Georgia
- Nationality: Georgia
- Height: 6 ft 7 in (2.01 m)
- Weight: 293 lb (133 kg; 20.9 st)
- Division: Super Heavyweight
- Team: Rings Georgia
- Years active: 1995 - 2002

Mixed martial arts record
- Total: 5
- Wins: 1
- By knockout: 1
- Losses: 4
- By knockout: 1
- By submission: 2
- Unknown: 1

Other information
- Mixed martial arts record from Sherdog

Ameran Bitsadze is a Georgia mixed martial artist. He competed in the Super Heavyweight division.

== Mixed martial arts record ==
Professional record breakdown
5 matches	1 win	4 losses
By knockout	1	1
By submission	0	2
Unknown	0	1

Res.	Record	Opponent	Method	Event	Date	Round	Time	Location	Notes
Loss	1–4	Rokas Stambrauskas	KO	Rings Lithuania: Bushido Rings 5: Shock	November 9, 2002	1	5:00	Vilnius, Lithuania	
Loss	1–3	Yoshihisa Yamamoto	Submission (armbar)	Rings: King of Kings 2000 Block B	December 22, 2000	1	4:39	Osaka, Japan	
Win	1–2	Andrey Reznik	TKO	Rings: Russia vs. Georgia	August 16, 2000	1	2:24	Tula, Russia	
Loss	0–2	Joop Kasteel	Submission (arm triangle choke)	Rings Holland: The King of Rings	February 8, 1998	1	2:15	North Holland, Netherlands	
Loss	0–1	Yoshihisa Yamamoto	N/A	Rings: Battle Dimensions Tournament 1995 Opening Round	October 21, 1995	0	0:00		

== See also ==
- List of male mixed martial artists
