= Bobby Razak =

English film director and producer

- Occupations: Director, producer
- Website: www.bobbyrazakmovies.com

Bobby Razak is an English film director and producer, best known for his work in the genres of mixed martial arts and extreme sports. Razak is also the founder of Tapout Films.

== Early life ==
Growing up in Tottenham, England, Razak was always fascinated by the stories of people who surrounded him, in addition to films such as Spartacus (film) and Enter the Dragon. Enthused by an interest in the art of cinematographic capture, Razak's passions would transfigure into his ultimate goal of becoming a filmmaker and pursuing his dream by moving to Los Angeles.

== Career ==
He continues to direct commercials for national and global brands. These brands include but are not limited to TapOut, Dethrone, BadBoy Apparel, WearHead, Metro PCS, and Hayabusa, airing on channels such as FOX Sports, Fuse and Spike TV. Razak has over 100 commercials to his credit and has directed and or produced over 12 films (combination of full-length features and shorts). His titles include The Striking Truth, Fallen Soldier, Sangre Nueva, and The History of MMA. Razak has been featured in Sundance and the Berlin Film Festival, and iNDemand pay-per-view for his acclaimed film Rites of Passage. Razak film Fallen Soldier debuted July 2015.

Razak also has a film on the life and death of Charles "Mask" Lewis, the co-founder of TapouT which was released in 2015.

On May 11, 2020, Razak released a new documentary film Jiu-Jitsu Strong about Brazilian jiu-jitsu, featuring several Gracie family members, Joe Rogan and multiple time World Jiu-Jitsu and ADCC champion Ronaldo Souza, among others.
