= Oktagon =

International martial arts tournament in Italy

Oktagon is an international martial arts tournament based in northern Italy and founded in 1996 by Carlo Di Blasi. The annual event is broadcast on DMAX and Rai Sport to 120 countries. Through 2015 (the twentieth edition), the tournaments were held at the Mediolanum Forum in Assago, near Milan. In 2016, it was announced that the event's venue would move to the Pala Alpitour in Turin and be held jointly with the American MMA promotion organization Bellator.

Oktagon contestants have included Giorgio Petrosyan and his brother Armen.

Di Blasi, founder and president of Oktagon, is also the president of the Italian martial arts organization Fight1. A member of the World MMA Association, the organization promotes Muay Thai, kickboxing, and mixed martial arts events such as Oktagon and Thai Boxe Mania as well as martial arts training.
