= Dick Vrij =

Dutch mixed martial arts fighter

- Born: May 1965 (age 61); Amsterdam, Netherlands
- Height: 6 ft 1 in (1.85 m)
- Weight: 242 lb (110 kg; 17.3 st)
- Division: Heavyweight
- Style: Kickboxing, Wrestling
- Teachers: Chris Dolman; Thom Harinck
- Years active: 1995 - 2003

Mixed martial arts record
- Total: 15
- Wins: 7
- By knockout: 5
- By decision: 2
- Losses: 7
- By knockout: 2
- By submission: 2
- Unknown: 3
- Draws: 1

Other information
- Mixed martial arts record from Sherdog

Dick Vrij is a retired Dutch professional wrestler and mixed martial artist. A professional competitor from 1995 until 2003, he competed in the Heavyweight division for RINGS and It's Showtime.

== Professional wrestling career ==
A former bodybuilder and club bouncer, Vrij started training martial arts at the Chris Dolman gym. He had his debut to a worldwide audience when he wrestled a special match in Japanese pro wrestling promotion UWF Newborn, facing Yoshiaki Fujiwara in a losing effort. He would return to defeat Yoji Anjo and lose again to Fujiwara. When the promotion closed, Dolman and Vrij followed UWF member Akira Maeda to his Fighting Network RINGS promotion in 1990, becoming full time wrestlers for it.

== Mixed martial arts career ==
=== Fighting Network RINGS ===
Vrij took part in RINGS's first main event, wrestling Maeda himself. He later became famous for his kickboxing strikes and intimidating physique, being nicknamed "Cyborg".

Vrij competed both in pro wrestling and shoot matches, having the first of them at the event RINGS Mega Battle IV, where he knocked out Mitsuya Nagai with a palm strike. He would defeat him in a rematch in RINGS Holland, knocking Nagai several times before winning by knee strike. They faced again in a rubber match in RINGS Maelstrom 6, but an improved Nagai capitalized on Vrij's lack of grappling skill and submitted him with a heel hook. Vrij would have another fight in Holland in 1997 against Pedro Palm, but the bout went to no contest due to Vrij landing an illegal kick while Palm was downed.

In February 1998, Vrij took on Ultimate Fighting Championship fighter Paul Varelans in a vale tudo rules match for his return to RINGS Holland. Dick fought in bad health and under heavy ephedrine medication for a foot injury gained in a wrestling match with Valentijn Overeem, but he did not back down from the event. The subsequent match was controversial, as although Dick dominated the first round with multiple unanswered combos, drawing abundant blood from Varelans's face and hitting ground and pound from the mount, the referee repeatedly pushed Vrij aside and restarted the bout instead of stopping it. At the second round, Vrij felt the effects of his health, and Varelans capitalized to land a right punch and knock him out, winning the match.

Vrij bounced back from the loss at the next Holland event, defeating another UFC alumnus in the form of Zane Frazier.

== Mixed martial arts record ==
Professional record breakdown
15 matches	7 wins	7 losses
By knockout	5	2
By submission	2	2
Unknown	0	3
Draws	1	

Res.	Record	Opponent	Method	Event	Date	Round	Time	Location	Notes
Win	7–7 (1)	Barrington Patterson	KO (punch)	It's Showtime: Amsterdam Arena	June 8, 2003	2	1:47	Amsterdam, Netherlands	
Loss	6–7 (1)	Chris Haseman	Submission (rear-naked choke)	RINGS Australia: NR 3	March 7, 1999	1	5:17	Australia	
Win	6–6 (1)	Zane Frazier	KO (punch)	RINGS Holland: Judgement Day	February 7, 1999	1	2:34	Amsterdam, Netherlands	
Loss	5–6 (1)	Wataru Sakata	TKO	RINGS: World Mega Battle Tournament	December 23, 1998	1	2:29	Japan	
Loss	5–5 (1)	Paul Varelans	KO (punch)	RINGS Holland: The King of Rings	February 8, 1998	2	0:30	Amsterdam, Netherlands	
Loss	5–4 (1)	Magomedkhan Gamzatkhanov	N/A	RINGS: Battle Dimensions Tournament 1997 Final	January 21, 1998	0	0:00	Japan	
Win	5–3 (1)	Tariel Bitsadze	Submission (rear-naked choke)	RINGS: Mega Battle Tournament 1997 Semifinal 1	October 25, 1997	1	6:07	Japan	
Win	4–3 (1)	Tony Halme	TKO (doctor stoppage)	RINGS: Extension Fighting 2	April 22, 1997	1	2:42	Japan	
NC	3–3 (1)	Pedro Palm	No Contest	RINGS Holland: The Final Challenge	February 2, 1997	1	1:00	Amsterdam, Netherlands	
Loss	3–3	Tsuyoshi Kosaka	N/A	RINGS: Battle Dimensions Tournament 1996 Opening Round	October 25, 1996	0	0:00	Japan	
Loss	3–2	Mitsuya Nagai	Submission (heel hook)	RINGS: Maelstrom 6	August 24, 1996	1	6:16	Japan	
Win	3–1	Hubert Numrich	Submission (forearm choke)	RINGS Holland: Kings of Martial Arts	February 18, 1996	1	1:48	Amsterdam, Netherlands	
Loss	2–1	Akira Maeda	N/A	RINGS: Battle Dimensions Tournament 1995 Opening Round	October 21, 1995	0	0:00	Japan	
Win	2–0	Mitsuya Nagai	KO (knee)	RINGS Holland: Free Fight	February 19, 1995	1	3:07	Amsterdam, Netherlands	
Win	1–0	Tony Halme	KO	RINGS: Budokan Hall 1995	January 25, 1995	1	2:55	Tokyo, Japan	

== See also ==
- List of male mixed martial artists
