= Masayuki Naruse =

Japanese professional wrestler

Masayuki Naruse 成瀬昌由
- Born: March 15, 1973 (age 53); Tokyo, Japan
- Other names: Kyo Senshi ("Mad Soldier"), Ultra Soul, Berserker (MMA)
- Nationality: Japanese
- Height: 1.73 m (5 ft 8 in)
- Weight: 87.5 kg (193 lb)
- Division: Heavyweight; Light Heavyweight
- Fighting out of: Japan
- Team: Rings Japan
- Teacher: Akira Maeda
- Years active: 1995–2004, 2013–present (MMA)

Mixed martial arts record
- Total: 23
- Wins: 9
- By knockout: 1
- By submission: 7
- Unknown: 1
- Losses: 14
- By knockout: 2
- By submission: 6
- By decision: 3
- Unknown: 3

Other information
- Mixed martial arts record from Sherdog

Masayuki Naruse (Japanese: 成瀬 昌由, Hepburn: Naruse Masayuki) (born March 15, 1973) is a Japanese mixed martial artist and professional wrestler, competing in the light heavyweight division who fought most of his career in Fighting Network RINGS (RINGS). As a professional wrestler, he notably competed in New Japan Pro Wrestling (NJPW) and All Japan Pro Wrestling (AJPW). In MMA, Naruse was the first and only RINGS Light-Heavyweight Champion and a former IWGP Junior Heavyweight Champion in professional wrestling.

== Mixed martial arts career ==
Naruse started practising shotokan karate in high school before turning his attention to puroresu. He was eventually accepted in Fighting Network RINGS and trained under his chairman Akira Maeda.

=== Fighting Network RINGS ===
A longtime competitor in RINGS before the organization began hosting true MMA bouts, Naruse had his first taste of MMA during his early career in mixed-style fights. He had his first shoot fight against submission wrestler Koichiro Kimura which he won via ankle lock. He then had another special shoot fight against kickboxer Atsushi Tamaki which went on for 24 minutes before Naruse emerged the winner via TKO due to lost points. They then had a rematch two months later which Naruse won again, this time via arm triangle choke.

Naruse experienced little success early in his mixed martial arts career, dropping six of his first seven mixed martial arts bouts, including fights against Valentijn Overeem and Magomedkhan Gamzatkhanov (commonly referred to by his nickname Volk Han).

He turned things around as a participant in the eight-man Light-Heavyweight title tournament in 1997, defeating Lee Hasdell, Wataru Sakata and Chris Haseman en route to becoming the first RINGS Light-Heavyweight Champion. He then went 3–6 over his next nine fights before RINGS dissolved in 2002.

=== After RINGS ===
After wrestling for New Japan Pro-Wrestling (NJPW), Naruse decided to go back to competing in MMA. On December 31, 2003, he defeated Jan Nortje by rear-naked choke at K-1 PREMIUM 2003 Dynamite!!. He then defeated Tommy Williams via armbar at Jungle Fight 3 in Brazil.

=== Return to MMA ===
Nine years after retiring in 2004, Naruse returned to MMA on October 27, 2013, as he lost to Sanae Kikuta via armbar at Grabaka Live! 3. Naruse then faced Japanese MMA legend Yuki Kondo at Pancrase: 257 on March 30, 2014. He lost the fight via majority decision.

== Professional wrestling career ==
=== Fighting Network RINGS ===
Naruse debuted for Fighting Network RINGS in 1992 where he was billed as a scrappy junior heavyweight. Among the wrestlers he took on during the organization's puroresu days include Heavyweight wrestler Yoshihisa Yamomoto, kickboxer Nobuaki Kakuta, UFC 10 participant Dieseul Berto, Volk Han, MMA veteran Satoshi Honma and future tag team partner Mitsuya Nagai.

Naruse and other RINGS wrestlers made the transition to mixed martial arts with the promotion in 1995.

=== New Japan Pro-Wrestling ===
In 2001 with RINGS on the verge of collapse, he moved to New Japan Pro-Wrestling. It was a well timed move as owner Antonio Inoki was giving former MMA fighters immediate pushes and he was immediately placed into a feud with Minoru Tanaka, who used to work for BattlARTS, RINGS' rival promotion. Within 4 months of his debut, Naruse captured the IWGP Junior Heavyweight Championship from his rival Tanaka.

He fought for NJPW from 2001 to 2006, defending his Junior Heavyweight title against Shinya Makabe and El Samurai before losing his belt to Tokimitsu Ishizawa, later Kendo Kashin. His next chance at the title was as one of 11 competitors in a Battle Royal on October 13, 2003 which as won by Jado.

Naruse paired with Mitsuya Nagai to win the All Asia Tag Team Championship on July 26, 2004 against Genichiro Tenryu and Masanobu Fuchi. They defended the belt three times before losing to Barry Buchanan and Rico Constantino on February 2, 2005.

His last bout came on January 8, 2006 against Takashi Iizuka, his 375th career match for New Japan Pro-Wrestling.

== Championships and accomplishments ==
=== Professional wrestling ===
- All Japan Pro Wrestling

- All Asia Tag Team Championship (1 time) – with Mitsuya Nagai

- New Japan Pro-Wrestling

- IWGP Junior Heavyweight Championship (1 time)
- G1 Jr. Six Man Tag Team Tournament (2001) – with Minoru Tanaka and Masahito Kakihara

=== Mixed martial arts ===
- Fighting Network RINGS
  - First and only RINGS Light-Heavyweight Champion

== Mixed martial arts record ==
Professional record breakdown
23 matches	9 wins	14 losses
By knockout	1	2
By submission	7	6
By decision	0	3
Unknown	1	3

Res.	Record	Opponent	Method	Event	Date	Round	Time	Location	Notes
Loss	9–14	Yuki Kondo	Decision (majority)	Pancrase: 257	March 30, 2014	2	5:00	Yokohama, Kanagawa, Japan	
Loss	9–13	Sanae Kikuta	Submission (armbar)	Grabaka: Grabaka Live! 3	October 27, 2013	1	2:25	Tokyo, Japan	
Win	9–12	Tony Williams	Submission (armbar)	Jungle Fight 3	October 23, 2004	1	3:21	Manaus, Brazil	
Win	8–12	Jan Nortje	Submission (rear-naked choke)	K-1 PREMIUM 2003 Dynamite!!	December 31, 2003	1	4:40	Nagoya, Japan	
Win	7–12	Ricardo Fyeet	Submission (toe hold)	Rings: Battle Genesis Vol. 7	March 20, 2001	1	3:46	Tokyo, Japan	
Loss	6–12	Hiromitsu Kanehara	Decision (unanimous)	Rings: Rise 4th	June 24, 1999	3	10:00	Tokyo, Japan	
Loss	6–11	Magomedkhan Gamzatkhanov	Submission (armbar)	Rings: Rise 3rd	May 22, 1999	1	4:26	Tokyo, Japan	
Loss	6–10	Chris Haseman	Submission (kimura)	Rings: Rise 2nd	April 23, 1999	1	8:18	Osaka, Japan	
Win	6–9	Dave van der Veen	Submission (achilles lock)	Rings: Rise 1st	March 20, 1999	1	7:36	Tokyo, Japan	
Loss	5–9	Joop Kasteel	TKO	Rings: World Mega Battle Tournament	December 23, 1998	1	8:33	Fukuoka, Japan	
Win	5–8	Kenichi Yamamoto	Submission	Rings: Fourth Fighting Integration	June 27, 1998	1	11:07	Tokyo, Japan	Defends RINGS Light-Heavyweight Title
Loss	4–8	Mikhail Ilyukhin	Submission (ankle lock)	Rings: Third Fighting Integration	May 28, 1998	1	13:52	Tokyo, Japan	
Loss	4–7	Mikhail Ilyukhin	Submission (ankle lock)	Rings – Mega Battle Tournament 1997 Semifinal 1	October 25, 1997	1	12:28	Tokyo, Japan	
Win	4–6	Chris Haseman	TKO	Rings: Extension Fighting 6	August 13, 1997	1	14:26	Kagoshima, Japan	Wins Rings Light-Heavyweight Title. Title later dissolved.
Win	3–6	Wataru Sakata	Submission	Rings: Extension Fighting 5	July 22, 1997	1	5:55	Osaka, Japan	Semifinals of Light-Heavyweight Title Tournament.
Win	2–6	Lee Hasdell	Submission (North/South Choke)	Rings – Extension Fighting 4	June 21, 1997	1	12:58	Tokyo, Japan	Quarterfinals of Light-Heavyweight Title Tournament.
Loss	1–6	Yoshihisa Yamamoto	Submission (armbar)	Rings – Extension Fighting 2	April 22, 1997	1	21:20	Osaka, Japan	
Loss	1–5	Valentijn Overeem	TKO (cut)	Rings Holland – The Final Challenge	February 2, 1997	1	3:58	Amsterdam, Holland	
Loss	1–4	Zaza Tkeshelashvili	N/A	Rings – Budokan Hall 1997	January 1, 1997	N/A	N/A	Tokyo, Japan	
Loss	1–3	Magomedkhan Gamzatkhanov	N/A	Rings – Battle Dimensions Tournament 1996 Opening Round	October 25, 1996	N/A	N/A	Nagoya, Japan	
Win	1–2	Egan Inoue	Disqualification	Rings – Maelstrom 6	August 24, 1996	1	11:51	Tokyo, Japan	
Loss	0–2	Willie Peeters	Decision (unanimous)	Rings Holland – Free Fight	February 19, 1995	1	10:00	Amsterdam, Holland	
Loss	0–1	Satir Gotchev	N/A	Rings – Budokan Hall 1995	January 25, 1995	N/A	N/A	Tokyo, Japan	

=== Mixed rules ===
Professional record breakdown
3 matches	3 wins	0 losses
By knockout	1	0
By submission	2	0
By decision	0	0
Draws	0	

Res.	Record	Opponent	Method	Event	Date	Round	Time	Location	Notes
Win	3-0	Atsushi Tamaki	Submission (arm triangle choke)	Rings Korakuen Experimental League 1993 Round 3	June 9, 1993	1	8:39	Tokyo, Japan	
Win	2-0	Atsushi Tamaki	TKO (lost points)	Rings Korakuen Experimental League 1993 Round 2	April 30, 1993	1	24:22	Tokyo, Japan	
Win	1-0	Koichiro Kimura	Submission (ankle lock)	Rings Mega Battle Special: Foundation	August 21, 1992	1	9:39	Yokohama, Japan	
