= Yoshihisa Yamamoto (wrestler) =

Japanese professional wrestler and mixed martial arts fighter

- Born: July 4, 1970 (age 56); Kudamatsu, Japan
- Native name: 山本宜久
- Nationality: Japanese
- Height: 6 ft 3 in (1.91 m)
- Weight: 220 lb (100 kg; 16 st)
- Division: Heavyweight; Welterweight
- Style: Judo, Wrestling, Muay thai, Boxing
- Rank: 1st Dan Black Belt in Judo
- Years active: 1995–2012 (MMA)

Mixed martial arts record
- Total: 42
- Wins: 15
- By knockout: 6
- By submission: 8
- By decision: 1
- Losses: 26
- By knockout: 11
- By submission: 12
- By decision: 3
- Draws: 1

Other information
- Mixed martial arts record from Sherdog

Yoshihisa Yamamoto (山本宜久, Yamamoto Yoshisa; born July 4, 1970) is a Japanese mixed martial artist and professional wrestler. A professional MMA competitor from 1995 until 2012, he competed for RINGS, WEF, PRIDE, Vale Tudo Japan, DEEP, and K-1 HERO'S.

== Mixed martial arts career ==
=== Fighting Network RINGS ===
A high school judoka, Yamamoto made his professional debut on the then puroresu promotion Fighting Network RINGS in 1991 against Masayuki Naruse, who was also making his debut. When the company turned to mixed martial arts, he had his first fight on January 25, 1995, facing off another debutant, Dutch fighter Hans Nijman. Yamamoto lost the bout when he was knocked out only 43 seconds into the fight. After winning his next bout for via unanimous decision at an event in Amsterdam for the organization, Yamamoto faced off against legendary Brazilian jiu-jitsu specialist, Rickson Gracie at Vale Tudo Japan 1995. Yamamoto gave the undefeated fighter arguably the most difficult fight of his career, but the former professional wrestler ultimately lost via rear-naked choke at 3:49 of the third round, the referee having stepped in when Yamamoto refused to tap out. This would be the only fight that Gracie ever had that didn't end with him winning in the first round.

The fight with Gracie elevated Yamamoto's status. In his next bout, he won via neck crank submission before losing via keylock submission to his teacher Akira Maeda and then to Ricardo Morais, who knocked out Yamamoto 46 seconds into the fight. In his next bout, Yamamoto faced David Khakhaleishvili, an Olympic Gold Medalist in judo. Yamamoto defeated the Georgia fighter via TKO 40 seconds into the fight before competing in the Rings - Battle Dimensions Tournament 1996 Final. Yamamoto won his fight in the quarter-finals of the tournament and then lost in his semi-finals match against Kiyoshi Tamura.

Yamamoto then went 7-7-1 in his next 15 fights with wins over Valentijn Overeem, Joop Kasteel, and Tsuyoshi Kosaka before being invited to compete in PRIDE.

=== PRIDE ===
Yamamoto made his PRIDE debut at Pride 16 on September 24, 2001 against Brazilian Assuério Silva and was dominated, losing only 11 seconds into the fight via TKO. However, the former professional wrestler would bounce back, defeating South African kickboxer Jan Nortje via armbar submission less than two minutes into the fight. In his next bouts he was knocked out by former NFL lineman Bob Sapp and then lost via unanimous decision to Guy Mezger before picking up his next win against Alexander Otsuka after Otsuka injured his leg in the second round. In his next bout at Pride Final Conflict 2003 Yamamoto fought Heath Herring and performed well against the Sambo and Muay Thai specialist but ultimately lost via rear-naked choke submission in the third round.

In his next bout the 13-16-1 Yamamoto faced two-time UFC Heavyweight Tournament Champion Mark Kerr. Early in the fight Kerr secured a double leg takedown but spiked his head into the canvas, stunning himself, which allowed Yamamoto to capitalize with ground and pound for the first round knockout win.

Yamamoto's next appearance for the organization was at Pride Bushido 2 against future 2006 Pride World Grand Prix Champion Mirko Cro Cop. Yamamoto lost the bout via TKO 2:12 into the first round. Yamamoto fought once more the organization at Pride Bushido 3 against Choi Mu-Bae and lost via unanimous decision.

=== Post-PRIDE ===
After PRIDE, Yamamoto fought for K-1 Hero's, and DEEP, but has not won since his TKO win over Mark Kerr, losing his last nine fights.

== Mixed martial arts record ==
Professional record breakdown
42 matches	15 wins	26 losses
By knockout	6	11
By submission	8	12
By decision	1	3
Draws	1	

Res.	Record	Opponent	Method	Event	Date	Round	Time	Location	Notes
Loss	15–26–1	Jong Wang Kim	KO (punches)	Grabaka: Grabaka Live! 2	October 27, 2012	1	0:15	Tokyo, Japan	Heavyweight bout.
Loss	15–25–1	Keiichiro Yamamiya	Decision (unanimous)	Grabaka Live: 1st Cage Attack	October 15, 2011	2	5:00	Tokyo, Japan	
Loss	15–24–1	Hidetaka Monma	Submission (arm-triangle choke)	DEEP: 50th Impact	October 24, 2010	1	1:07	Tokyo, Japan	Welterweight debut.
Loss	15–23–1	Lee Tae-Hyun	TKO (punches)	HERO'S 2007 in Korea	October 28, 2007	1	1:03	Seoul, South Korea	Openweight bout.
Loss	15–22–1	Katsuyori Shibata	TKO (punches)	HERO'S 8	March 12, 2007	1	0:09	Nagoya, Japan	
Loss	15–21–1	Don Frye	Submission (rear-naked choke)	HERO'S 6	August 5, 2006	1	4:52	Tokyo, Japan	
Loss	15–20–1	Kim Min-Soo	Submission (rear-naked choke)	HERO'S 4	March 15, 2006	2	1:32	Tokyo, Japan	
Loss	15–19–1	Choi Mu-Bae	Decision (unanimous)	PRIDE Bushido 3	May 23, 2004	2	5:00	Yokohama, Japan	
Loss	15–18–1	Mirko Cro Cop	TKO (punches)	PRIDE Bushido 2	February 15, 2004	1	2:12	Yokohama, Japan	
Win	15–17–1	Mark Kerr	KO (slam)	PRIDE 27	February 1, 2004	1	0:40	Osaka, Japan	Kerr knocked himself out going for a takedown.
Loss	14–17–1	Heath Herring	Submission (rear-naked choke)	PRIDE Final Conflict 2003	November 9, 2003	3	2:29	Tokyo, Japan	
Win	14–16–1	Alexander Otsuka	TKO (leg injury)	PRIDE 24	December 23, 2002	2	5:00	Fukuoka, Japan	
Loss	13–16–1	Guy Mezger	Decision (unanimous)	PRIDE 22	September 29, 2002	3	5:00	Nagoya, Japan	
Loss	13–15–1	Bob Sapp	KO (punches)	PRIDE 20	April 28, 2002	1	2:44	Yokohama, Japan	Super Heavyweight bout.
Win	13–14–1	Jan Nortje	Submission (armbar)	PRIDE 18	December 23, 2001	1	1:43	Fukuoka, Japan	
Loss	12–14–1	Assuério Silva	TKO (punches)	PRIDE 16	September 24, 2001	1	0:11	Osaka, Japan	
Loss	12–13–1	Valentijn Overeem	Submission (armbar)	RINGS: King of Kings 2000 Final	February 24, 2001	1	0:45	Tokyo, Japan	Kings of Kings 2000 Tournament Quarter Final.
Win	12–12–1	Chris Haseman	TKO (strikes)	RINGS: King of Kings 2000 Block B	December 22, 2000	1	3:51	Osaka, Japan	Kings of Kings 2000 Tournament Second Round.
Win	11–12–1	Ameran Bitsadze	Submission (armbar)	RINGS: King of Kings 2000 Block B	December 22, 2000	1	3:49	Osaka, Japan	Kings of Kings 2000 Tournament First Round.
Loss	10–12–1	Semmy Schilt	KO (knee and punch)	RINGS Holland: Di Capo Di Tutti Capi	June 4, 2000	1	2:54	Utrecht, Netherlands	
Loss	10–11–1	Branden Lee Hinkle	Submission (rear-naked choke)	World Extreme Fighting 9: World Class	May 13, 2000	1	2:21	Evansville, Indiana, USA	
Loss	10–10–1	Jeremy Horn	Submission (arm-triangle choke)	RINGS: Millennium Combine 1	April 20, 2000	2	2:50	Tokyo, Japan	
Loss	10–9–1	Brad Kohler	Submission (smother choke)	RINGS: King of Kings 1999 Block A	October 28, 1999	1	1:57	Tokyo, Japan	
Draw	10–8–1	Kiyoshi Tamura	Draw	RINGS: Rise 4th	June 24, 1999	3	5:00	Japan	
Win	10–8	Tsuyoshi Kosaka	TKO (palm strikes)	RINGS: Rise 3rd	May 22, 1999	3	0:41	Japan	
Win	9–8	Joop Kasteel	TKO (palm strikes)	RINGS: Rise 2nd	April 23, 1999	1	7:32	Japan	
Win	8–8	Valentijn Overeem	Submission (armbar)	RINGS: Rise 1st	March 20, 1999	1	2:40	Japan	
Win	7–8	Andrei Kopylov	Submission	RINGS: Final Capture	February 21, 1999	1	6:55	Japan	
Win	6-8	Mitsuya Nagai	Submission (armbar)	RINGS: Extension Fighting 5	July 22, 1997	1	2:27	Japan	
Win	5–8	Masayuki Naruse	Submission (armbar)	RINGS: Extension Fighting 2	April 22, 1997	1	21:20	Japan	
Loss	4–8	Tariel Bitsadze	KO (punch)	RINGS: Budokan Hall 1997	January 22, 1997	1	0:30	Tokyo, Japan	
Loss	4–7	Tariel Bitsadze	TKO (punches)	RINGS: Battle Dimensions Tournament 1996 Final	January 1, 1997	1	3:59	Japan	
Loss	4–6	Kiyoshi Tamura	Submission (neck crank)	RINGS: Battle Dimensions Tournament 1996 Final	January 1, 1997	1	2:41	Tokyo, Japan	Battle Dimensions Tournament 1996 Semi Final.
Win	4–5	Bakouri Gogitidze	Submission (americana)	RINGS: Battle Dimensions Tournament 1996 Final	January 1, 1997	1	1:00	Tokyo, Japan	Battle Dimensions Tournament 1996 Quarter Final.
Win	3–5	David Khakhaleishvili	TKO (punches)	RINGS: Battle Dimensions Tournament 1996 Opening Round	October 25, 1996	1	0:40	Tokyo, Japan	Battle Dimensions Tournament 1996 Opening Round.
Loss	2–5	Ricardo Morais	KO (punches)	RINGS: Maelstrom 6	August 24, 1996	1	0:46	Japan	
Loss	2–4	Akira Maeda	Submission (americana)	RINGS: Budokan Hall 1996	January 24, 1996	1	4:50	Tokyo, Japan	
Win	2–3	Ameran Bitsadze	Submission (neck crank)	RINGS: Battle Dimensions Tournament 1995 Opening Round	October 21, 1995	3	1:59	Japan	
Loss	1–3	Rickson Gracie	Technical Submission (rear-naked choke)	Vale Tudo Japan 1995	April 20, 1995	3	3:49	Tokyo, Japan	
Loss	1–2	Mitsuya Nagai	Submission (achilles lock)	RINGS: Rising Series - Yayoi	March 18, 1995	1	17:18	Tokyo, Japan	
Win	1–1	Ruud Ewoldt	Decision (unanimous)	RINGS Holland: Free Fight	February 19, 1995	3	5:00	Amsterdam, Netherlands	
Loss	0–1	Hans Nijman	KO (punch)	RINGS: Budokan Hall 1995	January 25, 1995	1	0:43	Tokyo, Japan	
