= Super heavyweight (MMA) =

Weight class in Mixed Martial Arts

The super heavyweight division in mixed martial arts has no weight limit but generally refers to competitors weighing above 265 lb (120 kg). This is the definition used by the Nevada State Athletic Commission and the Association of Boxing Commissions.

Across Europe and Asia, there are numerous promotions that feature open-weight competitions that qualify as super heavyweight bouts. One such example is in Japan, where mixed martial arts organizations are not obligated by law to implement weight classes. Many open-weight bouts are designed around the theme of matching an extraordinarily large fighter against a much smaller but more skilled opponent. Therefore, the distinction between super heavyweight and heavyweight held little relevance in both-defunct promotions such as DREAM and the Pride Fighting Championships.

In the United States, where state sanctioning laws often prohibit inter-divisional bouts, the super heavyweight class is necessary to pair two fighters above 265 lb.

Aside from open-weight competitions, the division has never been fully endorsed by any major promotion (except for the open weight bouts of MFC, M-1, and DREAM). However, some minor organizations, such as King of the Cage do feature bouts in the division, and organizations such as the Ultimate Fighting Championship and World Extreme Cagefighting have held a select few super heavyweight bouts in the past.

== See also ==
- List of current MMA Super Heavyweight champions
