= Guillotine choke =

Martial arts technique

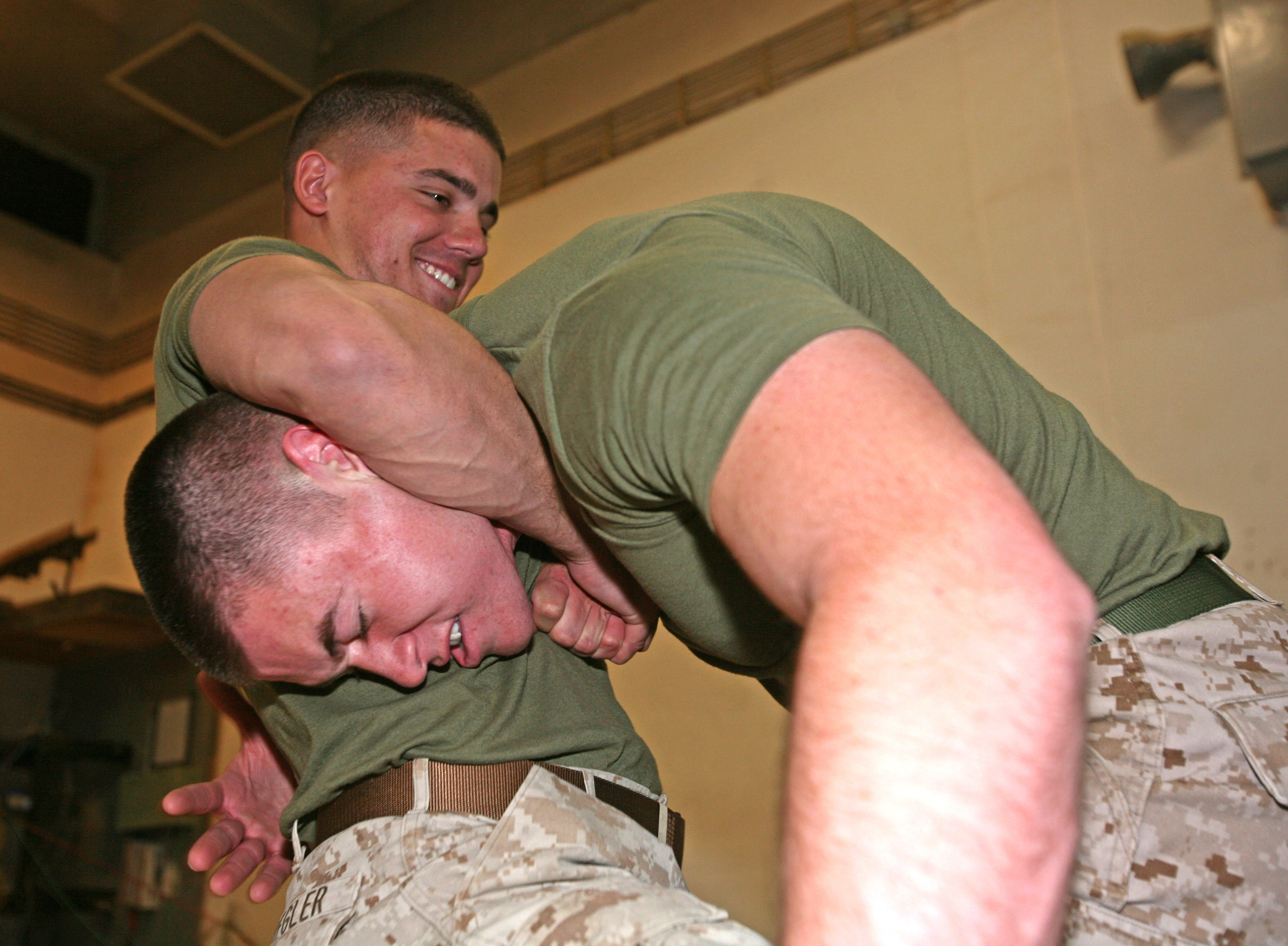
- Applied standing
- Classification: Chokehold
- Style: Judo, Jujutsu, Brazilian jiu-jitsu
- AKA: 前裸絞 (mae hadaka jime)

The guillotine choke, also known as mae hadaka jime (前裸絞, "front naked choke"; compared to a rear naked choke) in judo, is a chokehold in martial arts applied from in front of the opponent, often on the ground but it can also be done while standing. The choke involves using the arms to encircle the opponent's neck in a way that bears a resemblance to the blade of a guillotine.

== Application ==
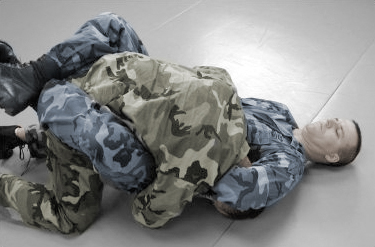
Guillotine choke applied on the ground by bottom fighter in a closed guard

The technique is either a type of tracheal compression restraint (air choke) that prevents air flow to the lungs, or a blood choke depending on how and where pressure is applied, the trachea versus arteries respectively. It can be applied both standing and from the ground using only one arm, and can be used as a defense against a double leg takedown, as well as using the other arm and legs to either transition position or grapple or strike the opponent.

When executed from the ground, the person applying it will try to control the opponent by the hips, for instance using a closed guard. This is done to prevent the opponent from escaping the hold, and to be able to apply additional pressure by extending the hips. It is a very effective maneuver when performed correctly.

The arm is wrapped around the trachea and the hands are clasped. Pressure is applied upwards to restrict blood flow to the head, eventually causing unconsciousness and, if applied for more time, even death. Alternatively, it can also be a neck crank that strains the cervical vertebrae and possibly damages the trachea, larynx and hyoid bone and other parts of the neck, and can potentially cause paralysis, unconsciousness and death. It is taught in various grappling martial arts and is considered universal to grappling, including Jujutsu, Brazilian jiu-jitsu, Judo, as well as in mixed martial arts competition and exists as one of the most instinctive chokes.

The Guillotine can be applied either solely around the opponent's neck or including an arm, with the standard guillotine taking 8.9 seconds to render someone unconscious and an arm-in guillotine taking 10.2 seconds on average.

Following the match between Conor McGregor and Dustin Poirier, during UFC 264 where McGregor attempted a guillotine choke, fighter Israel Adesanya commented on why he avoids attempting the choke in matches. Adesanya claimed that one of the choke's largest drawbacks was that it left the individual attempting it underneath his opponent.

== Description ==
The 2002 U.S Army Combatives field manual states that the fighter should first ensure that the enemy's head goes underneath one of their arms. The fighter wraps their arm around the enemy's head and under their neck. The fighter's palm should be facing their own chest. With the other hand, the fighter grasps the first hand, ensuring that they have not reached around the enemy's arm, and pulls upward with both hands. They now sit down and place the enemy within their guard, and finish the choke by pulling with their arms and pushing with their legs.
