= Ricardo Fyeet =

Dutch martial artist

- Born: 24 September 1976 (age 50); Haarlem, Netherlands
- Other names: The Animal
- Height: 185 cm (6 ft 1 in)
- Weight: 95 kg (209 lb; 14 st 13 lb)
- Division: Heavyweight; Light Heavyweight
- Stance: Orthodox
- Fighting out of: Amsterdam, Netherlands
- Team: Golden Glory
- Years active: 1998-2001

Mixed martial arts record
- Total: 12
- Wins: 5
- By knockout: 4
- By disqualification: 1
- Losses: 6
- By submission: 6
- No contests: 1

Other information
- Mixed martial arts record from Sherdog

Ricardo Fyeet (born 24 September 1976) is a retired Dutch professional kickboxer and mixed martial artist. A professional in MMA from 1998 until 2001, he competed for RINGS and It's Showtime.

== Personal life ==
Fyeet's brother, Andre, is also a former kickboxer and mixed martial artist who competed primarily in the Light Heavyweight division and trained out of Mike's Gym. Andre retired in 2010 with a record of 5-12.

Fyeet currently lives in Amsterdam, running his own school; Team Fyeet.

== Mixed martial arts record ==
Professional record breakdown
12 matches	5 wins	6 losses
By knockout	4	0
By submission	0	6
By disqualification	1	0
No contests	1	

Res.	Record	Opponent	Method	Event	Date	Round	Time	Location	Notes
Win	5–6 (1)	Sander MacKilljan	DQ	It's Showtime: Original	October 21, 2001	1	0:56	Haarlem, Holland	
Loss	4–6 (1)	Hirotaka Yokoi	Submission (armbar)	RINGS: 10th Anniversary	August 11, 2001	1	2:34	Tokyo, Japan	
Loss	4–5 (1)	Masayuki Naruse	Submission (toe hold)	RINGS: Battle Genesis Vol. 7	March 20, 2001	1	3:46	Tokyo, Japan	
Loss	4–4 (1)	Rodney Glunder	Submission (guillotine choke)	RINGS Holland: Heroes Live Forever	January 28, 2001	2	1:04	Utrecht, Holland	
Loss	4–3 (1)	Andrei Kopylov	Submission (achilles lock)	RINGS: King of Kings 1999 Block B	December 22, 1999	1	0:08	Osaka, Japan	
Win	4–2 (1)	Tyrone Roberts	KO (head kick)	RINGS: King of Kings 1999 Block B	December 22, 1999	2	0:09	Osaka, Japan	
Loss	3–2 (1)	Alistair Overeem	Submission (guillotine choke)	It's Showtime (kickboxing)	October 24, 1999	1	1:39	Haarlem, Holland	
Win	3–1 (1)	Mick Cutajar	KO (elbows)	RINGS: Battle Genesis Vol. 5	September 15, 1999	1	3:30	Tokyo, Japan	
Loss	2–1 (1)	Lee Hasdell	Submission (toe hold)	RINGS: Rise 5th	August 19, 1999	1	15:01	Yokohama, Japan	
NC	2–0 (1)	Jerrel Venetiaan	No Contest	RINGS Holland: The Kings of the Magic Ring	June 20, 1999	1	1:08	Utrecht, Holland	Heavyweight debut.
Win	2–0	Tjerk Vermanen	TKO (elbow injury)	RINGS Holland: Judgement Day	February 7, 1999	1	1:10	Amsterdam, Holland	
Win	1–0	Andrew Keja	KO (punches)	RINGS Holland: The Thialf Explosion	October 24, 1998	1	0:45	Heerenveen, Holland	
