= Brad Kohler =

American mixed martial artist

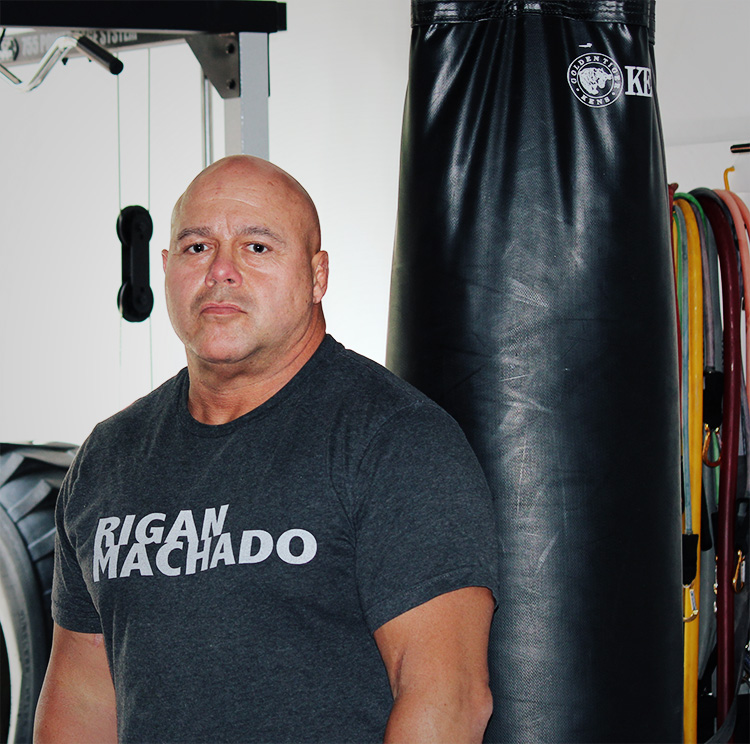
- Kohler in 2013
- Born: Bradley Kohler; May 26, 1964 (age 62); Bloomington, Minnesota, U.S.
- Height: 5 ft 9 in (1.75 m)
- Weight: 234 lb (106 kg; 16.7 st)
- Division: Heavyweight
- Stance: Orthodox
- Fighting out of: Minneapolis, Minnesota
- Team: Minnesota Martial Arts Academy
- Years active: 1997–2004, 2010–2012 (MMA)

Mixed martial arts record
- Total: 34
- Wins: 19
- By knockout: 15
- By submission: 4
- Losses: 15
- By knockout: 9
- By submission: 6

Other information
- Notable students: Travis Wiuff, Matt Larson
- Mixed martial arts record from Sherdog

Bradley Kohler (born May 26, 1964) is an American retired professional mixed martial artist who competed in the Heavyweight division. A professional from 1997 until 2012, Kohler competed for the UFC, RINGS and DEEP.

== Career accomplishments ==
=== Mixed martial arts ===
- Ultimate Fighting Championship
  - UFC Encyclopedia Awards
    - Knockout of the Night (One time) vs. Steve Judson

== Mixed martial arts record ==
Professional record breakdown
27 matches	12 wins	15 losses
By knockout	8	9
By submission	4	6

Res.	Record	Opponent	Method	Event	Date	Round	Time	Location	Notes
Win	12–15	Shane DeZee	TKO (submission to punches)	Throwdown at the Crowne	September 8, 2012	2	1:42	St. Paul, Minnesota, United States	
Loss	11–15	Brad Scholten	TKO (doctor stoppage)	Violent Night	June 2, 2012	1	5:00	Maplewood, Minnesota, United States	
Loss	11–14	Cameron Befort	TKO (submission to punches)	Gladiator	October 2, 2010	1	3:27	Rochester, Minnesota, United States	
Loss	11–13	Travis Fulton	KO (head kick)	XKL Evolution 2	April 24, 2010	1	1:01	Minneapolis, Minnesota, United States	
Loss	11–12	Jong Wang Kim	Submission (rear-naked choke)	Gladiator FC: Day 1	June 6, 2004	1	1:19	South Korea	
Loss	11–11	Dos Caras Jr.	TKO (shoulder injury)	DEEP: 12th Impact	September 15, 2003	1	1:25	Tokyo, Japan	Openweight bout.
Loss	11–10	Greg Wikan	TKO (injury)	UW: St. Cloud 1	March 15, 2002	1	1:25	Minnesota, United States	
Loss	11–9	Valentijn Overeem	Submission (kneebar)	RINGS: Millennium Combine 2	June 15, 2000	1	0:31	Tokyo, Japan	
Loss	11–8	Jason Allar	TKO (strikes)	EC 31: Extreme Challenge 31	March 24, 2000	1	3:42	Kenosha, Wisconsin, United States	
Loss	11–7	Chris Haseman	Submission (kimura)	RINGS: King of Kings 1999 Final	February 26, 2000	1	1:11	Tokyo, Japan	
Loss	11–6	Renato Sobral	KO (soccer kick)	WEF 8: Goin' Platinum	January 15, 2000	2	0:50	Rome, Georgia, United States	
Loss	11–5	Mikhail Ilyukhin	Submission (armbar)	RINGS: King of Kings 1999 Block A	October 28, 1999	1	2:16	Tokyo, Japan	
Win	11–4	Yoshihisa Yamamoto	Submission (smother)	RINGS: King of Kings 1999 Block A	October 28, 1999	1	1:57	Tokyo, Japan	
Win	10–4	Steve Judson	KO (punch)	UFC 22	September 24, 1999	1	0:30	Lake Charles, Louisiana, United States	
Win	9–4	Butch Williams	Submission (armbar)	UW: Ultimate Wrestling	August 13, 1999	1	4:15	Bloomington, Minnesota, United States	
Win	8–4	Andy Douglas	Submission (rear-naked choke)	CC 3: Cage Combat 3	July 15, 1999	1	1:30	Cleveland, Ohio, United States	
Loss	7–4	Dan Severn	TKO	UW: Ultimate Wrestling	June 25, 1999	1	7:57	Cleveland, Ohio, United States	
Loss	7–3	Paul Pumphery	TKO (injury)	EC 17: Extreme Challenge 17	November 4, 1998	1	0:06	Cleveland, Ohio, United States	
Loss	7–2	Joe Pardo	Submission (heel hook)	EC 17: Extreme Challenge 15	February 27, 1998	1	1:43	Muncie, Indiana, United States	
Loss	7–1	Tra Telligman	Submission (armbar)	UFC Japan: Ultimate Japan	December 21, 1997	1	10:05	Yokohama, Japan	
Win	7–0	Joe Slick	TKO (corner stoppage)	IFC 6: Battle at Four Bears	September 20, 1997	1	4:12	New Town, North Dakota, United States	
Win	6–0	Joel Sutton	TKO (corner stoppage)	IFC 6: Battle at Four Bears	September 20, 1997	1	1:24	New Town, North Dakota, United States	
Win	5–0	Sam Adkins	TKO (cut)	EC 9: Extreme Challenge 9	August 30, 1997	1	6:56	Davenport, Iowa, United States	
Win	4–0	Scott Morton	Submission (neck crank)	EC 8: Extreme Challenge 8	August 9, 1997	1	3:42	Iowa, United States	
Win	3–0	Caz Daniels	TKO (submission to punches)	HOOKnSHOOT: Absolute Fighting Championship 2	July 19, 1997	1	17:35	United States	
Win	2–0	Frank Amalfitano	TKO (hand injury)	HOOKnSHOOT: Absolute Fighting Championship 2	July 19, 1997	1	4:52	United States	
Win	1–0	Travis Fulton	TKO (submission to punches)	HOOKnSHOOT: Absolute Fighting Championship 2	July 19, 1997	1	52:24	United States	
