= RINGS King of Kings Tournament 1999 =

Fighting Network Rings MMA event 1999

King of Kings Tournament 1999
- Promotion: Fighting Network Rings
- Date: October 28, 1999 - February 26, 2000
- City: Tokyo and Osaka

The King of Kings Tournament 1999 was a series of three separate mixed martial arts events held by the Fighting Network Rings (RINGS). The tournament took place in both Tokyo and Osaka between October 28, 1999 and February 26, 2000. The tournament was the first of two King of Kings tournaments. The tournament matched up 32 of the best fighters from nine countries.

== Rules ==
The tournament had two qualifying events: King of Kings 1999 Block A and King of Kings 1999 Block B. The fighters who advance from the qualifying events would compete in the King of Kings 1999 Final. The fights would consist of two five-minute rounds and, as in all RINGS bouts, no striking was allowed to the head of a grounded opponent.

== King of Kings 1999 Block A ==
The first event of the tournament took place on October 28, 1999 at the Yoyogi National Stadium in Tokyo, Japan.

=== Results ===
King of Kings 1999 Block A Round of 16
Weight class				Method	Round	Time	Notes
	Mikhail Ilyukhin	def.	Brad Kohler	Submission (armbar)	1	2:16
	Dan Henderson	def.	Hiromitsu Kanehara	Decision (majority)	2	5:00
	Antônio Rodrigo Nogueira	def.	Yuriy Kochkine	Technical Submission (armbar)	1	0:40
	Renato Sobral	def.	Lee Hasdell	Decision (unanimous)	2	5:00
King of Kings 1999 Block A Round of 32
	Brad Kohler	def.	Yoshihisa Yamamoto	Submission (smother)	1	1:57
	Mikhail Ilyukhin	def.	Justin McCully	Technical Submission (achilles lock)	1	4:48
	Dan Henderson	def.	Bakouri Gogitidze	Submission (knee to the ribs)	1	2:17
	Hiromitsu Kanehara	def.	Jeremy Horn	Decision (majority)	2	5:00
	Antônio Rodrigo Nogueira	def.	Valentijn Overeem	Technical Submission (keylock)	1	1:51
	Yuriy Kochkine	def.	Alistair Overeem	Decision (majority)	2	5:00
	Renato Sobral	def.	Zaza Tkeshelashvili	Submission (kimura)	2	1:11
	Lee Hasdell	def.	Achmed Labasanov	TKO (kick)	2	3:33

== King of Kings 1999 Block B ==
The second event of the tournament took place on December 22, 1999 at the Osaka Prefectural Gymnasium in Osaka, Japan.

=== Results ===
King of Kings 1999 Block B Round of 16
Weight class				Method	Round	Time	Notes
	Kiyoshi Tamura	def.	Borislav Jeliazkov	Submission (rear-naked choke)	2	1:17
	Gilbert Yvel	def.	Tsuyoshi Kosaka	TKO (cut)	1	1:17
	Renzo Gracie	def.	Maurice Smith	Submission (armlock)	1	0:50
	Andrei Kopylov	def.	Ricardo Fyeet	Submission (achilles lock)	1	0:08
King of Kings 1999 Block B Round of 32
	Kiyoshi Tamura	def.	Dave Menne	Decision (unanimous)	2	5:00
	Borislav Jeliazkov	def.	Tim Lajcik	Submission (rear-naked choke)	1	2:23
	Tsuyoshi Kosaka	def.	Chris Haseman	Decision (split)	3	5:00	(Note: Declared a draw after two rounds.)
	Gilbert Yvel	def.	Tariel Bitsadze	Submission (armbar)	1	2:18
	Renzo Gracie	def.	Wataru Sakata	Submission (armbar)	1	1:25
	Maurice Smith	def.	Branden Lee Hinkle	Decision (majority)	2	5:00
	Ricardo Fyeet	def.	Tyrone Roberts	KO (kick)	2	0:09
	Andrei Kopylov	def.	Leonardo Castello Branco	Submission (kneebar)	1	0:16

== King of Kings 1999 Final ==
The third and final event of the tournament took place on February 26, 2000 at the Nippon Budokan in Tokyo, Japan.

=== Results ===
Rings King of Kings 1999 Final
Weight class				Method	Round	Time	Notes
	Dan Henderson	def.	Renato Sobral	Decision (majority)	2	5:00	(Note: Henderson wins the RINGS King of Kings 1999 Tournament.)
	Chris Haseman	def.	Brad Kohler	Submission (kimura)	1	1:11	(Note: Alternate bout.)
	Renato Sobral	def.	Kiyoshi Tamura	Decision (majority)	2	5:00	(Note: Semifinals bout. Sobral outweighed Tamura by 45 pounds.)
	Dan Henderson	def.	Antônio Rodrigo Nogueira	Decision (split)	3	5:00	(Note: Semifinals bout. Declared a draw after two rounds.)
	Bobby Hoffman	def.	Zaza Tkeshelashvili	KO (punch)	1	0:34	(Note: Alternate bout.)
	Kiyoshi Tamura	def.	Renzo Gracie	Decision (unanimous)	2	5:00	(Note: Quarterfinals bout.)
	Antônio Rodrigo Nogueira	def.	Andrei Kopylov	Decision (majority)	2	5:00	(Note: Quarterfinals bout.)
	Dan Henderson	def.	Gilbert Yvel	Decision (unanimous)	2	5:00	(Note: Quarterfinals bout.)
	Renato Sobral	def.	Mikhail Ilyukhin	Submission (armbar)	3	0:40	(Note: Quarterfinals bout. Declared a draw after two rounds.)

== Tournament Bracket ==
Round of 32
October 28, 1999

December 22, 1999

Round of 16
October 28, 1999

December 22, 1999

Quarterfinals
February 26, 2000

Semifinals
February 26, 2000

Finals
February 26, 2000

(United States)
Dan Henderson
SUB

(Georgia (country))
Bakouri Gogitidze
2:17

(United States)
Dan Henderson
DEC

(Japan)
Hiromitsu Kanehara
10:00

(Japan)
Hiromitsu Kanehara
DEC

(United States)
Jeremy Horn
10:00

(United States)
Dan Henderson
DEC

(Netherlands)
Gilbert Yvel
10:00

(Netherlands)
Gilbert Yvel
SUB

(Georgia (country))
Tariel Bitsadze
2:18

(Netherlands)
Gilbert Yvel
TKO

(Japan)
Tsuyoshi Kosaka
1:17

(Japan)
Tsuyoshi Kosaka
DEC

(Australia)
Chris Haseman
15:00

(United States)
Dan Henderson
DEC

(Brazil)
Antônio Rodrigo Nogueira
15:00

(Brazil)
Antônio Rodrigo Nogueira
SUB

(Netherlands)
Valentijn Overeem
1:51

(Brazil)
Antônio Rodrigo Nogueira
SUB

(Russia)
Yuriy Kochkine
0:40

(Russia)
Yuriy Kochkine
DEC

(Netherlands)
Alistair Overeem
10:00

(Brazil)
Antônio Rodrigo Nogueira
DEC

(Russia)
Andrei Kopylov
10:00

(Russia)
Andrei Kopylov
SUB

(Brazil)
Leonardo Castello Branco
0:16

(Russia)
Andrei Kopylov
SUB

(Netherlands)
Ricardo Fyeet
0:08

(Netherlands)
Ricardo Fyeet
KO

(United States)
Tyrone Roberts
5:09

(United States)
Dan Henderson
DEC

(Brazil)
Renato Sobral
10:00

(Brazil)
Renato Sobral
SUB

(Georgia (country))
Zaza Tkeshelashvili
6:11

(Brazil)
Renato Sobral
DEC

(England)
Lee Hasdell
10:00

(England)
Lee Hasdell
TKO

(Russia)
Achmed Labasanov
8:33

(Brazil)
Renato Sobral
SUB

(Russia)
Mikhail Ilyukhin
10:40

(Russia)
Mikhail Ilyukhin
SUB

(United States)
Justin McCully
4:48

(Russia)
Mikhail Ilyukhin
SUB

(United States)
Brad Kohler
2:16

(United States)
Brad Kohler
SUB

(Japan)
Yoshihisa Yamamoto
1:57

(Brazil)
Renato Sobral
DEC

(Japan)
Kiyoshi Tamura
10:00

(Japan)
Kiyoshi Tamura
DEC

(United States)
Dave Menne
10:00

(Japan)
Kiyoshi Tamura
SUB

(Bulgaria)
Borislav Jeliazkov
6:17

(Bulgaria)
Borislav Jeliazkov
SUB

(United States)
Tim Lajcik
2:23

(Japan)
Kiyoshi Tamura
DEC

(Brazil)
Renzo Gracie
10:00

(Brazil)
Renzo Gracie
SUB

(Japan)
Wataru Sakata
1:25

(Brazil)
Renzo Gracie
SUB

(United States)
Maurice Smith
0:50

(United States)
Maurice Smith
DEC

(United States)
Branden Lee Hinkle
10:00

== See also ==
- Fighting Network Rings
- List of Fighting Network Rings events
- 1999 in Fighting Network Rings
- 2000 in Fighting Network Rings
