= Fighting Network Rings =

Japanese Professional Wrestling and MMA promotion

- Trade name: RINGS
- Type: Private
- Industry: Professional wrestling promotion Mixed martial arts promotion
- Predecessor: Newborn UWF
- Founded: 1991; 2008 (revived promotion)
- Founder: Akira Maeda
- Defunct: February 15, 2002 (original promotion)
- Successor: ZST (Mixed Martial Arts); U-Style (Professional Wrestling)
- Key people: Akira Maeda

Fighting Network Rings, trademarked as RINGS, was a Japanese combat sport promotion that has lived three distinct periods: shoot-style puroresu promotion from its inauguration to 1995, mixed martial arts (MMA) promotion from 1995 to its 2002 disestablishment, and a revived amateur MMA organization from 2008 onward, which continued holding events under the Rings name until at least 2022.

Rings was founded by Akira Maeda on May 11, 1991, following the end of the Universal Wrestling Federation (UWF), where Maeda had been the promotion's Ace and one of its leading figures. Founded in 1984, the UWF was a pioneering promotion in shoot-style, a form of professional wrestling that emphasized realistic-looking combat, legitimate martial arts techniques, and competition rather than the more theatrical style traditionally associated with professional wrestling. Rings was established to continue and develop this approach, while differentiating from other UWF successors by recruiting foreigners with experience in legitimate martial arts and combat sports, particularly from the Netherlands and Eastern Europe, as Maeda implemented influences from Dutch kickboxing and Sambo. While initially mainly a professional wrestling promotion, Rings occasionally had shoot fights between its performers, and gradually began incorporating more legitimate combat sports into its events. In 1995, the promotion began transitioning towards exclusively real fights under the Rings ruleset, marking its transition towards the nascent sport of Mixed Martial Arts (MMA), although worked shoot-style matches continued to appear sporadically. Following Maeda's retirement in 1999, Rings completed its transition to legitimate MMA, culminating in the King of Kings Tournament 1999, a 32-man international tournament featuring many prominent MMA fighters. Rings also distinguished itself through its organization of foreign fighters into country-based teams, helping connect fighters and combat sports scenes from around the world with the developing Japanese MMA scene.

Rings expanded internationally during the late 1990s, creating a network of affiliated promotions in the Netherlands, Russia, Australia, and Georgia. The Japanese promotion ceased activity in February 2002, while Rings Holland and other affiliated organizations continued independently. In November 2002, ZST was established in Japan, providing a new promotion for many former Rings fighters who continued competing in MMA under Rings' unique rules. Rings Japan returned as an active promotion in 2008, hosting a series of amateur events called The Outsider from 2008 up to 2022.

== History ==
=== Early history ===
Rings was founded by Akira Maeda on May 11, 1991, following the dissolution of Newborn UWF. At that time, Maeda and Mitsuya Nagai were the only two people to transfer from UWF, wrestlers such as Kiyoshi Tamura, Hiromitsu Kanehara and Kenichi Yamamoto would later also transfer from UWF International. Maeda sought to further evolve the shoot-style wrestling concept by establishing Rings as a distinct form of combat sport, emphasizing realistic fighting and competition between practitioners of different martial arts rather than just professional wrestling, with the ambition of determining the world's strongest fighter, as reflected in Rings's slogan "The world's strongest man will be determined by Rings" and recruited fighters from a variety of disciplines and countries. For the first few events in 1991, the organization was named Professional Wrestling Network Rings.

Rings established a television deal with WOWOW, a Japanese satellite broadcaster, which provided the promotion with significant financial backing and helped facilitate Maeda's ambitious international recruitment strategy. The partnership gave Rings a prominent platform for its events and became an important part of the promotion's growth throughout the 1990s.

A key distinction of Rings among the various UWF successor promotions was Akira Maeda's focus on recruiting elite athletes from around the world, particularly from countries with strong amateur wrestling and combat sports traditions, avoiding North American and Mexican pro wrestlers. Rings brought in high-level sports wrestlers, judoka, kickboxers, samboists, boxers, and Brazilian jiu-jitsu from countries including Russia, Georgia, Bulgaria, the Netherlands, Brazil and the United States, with its roster featuring numerous Olympians and Olympic medalists such as Alexander Karelin, David Khakhaleishvili, and Svilen Rusinov to world and national champions such as Chris Dolman, Volk Han, Suren Balachinsky, Andrei Tournamidze, and other internationally recognized competitors. The presence of athletes who had achieved success at the highest levels of their respective disciplines gave Rings a distinctive degree of athletic credibility and helped establish the promotion as one of the most internationally diverse and talent-rich organizations in the history of shoot-style professional wrestling and the emerging scene of mixed martial arts.

Rings also distinguished itself through its organization of foreign fighters into country-based teams or stables. Beginning in the early 1990s, the promotion established groups representing countries including the Netherlands, Russia, Georgia and Bulgaria, with later teams representing Brazil, Australia, the United Kingdom and the United States. These groups were presented as national representatives and were frequently matched against one another as well as against Japanese Rings fighters, giving the promotion an international team-based identity. At the 1992 Rings Mega-Battle Special, for example, representatives of Rings Holland, Rings Russia, Rings Georgia and the newly established Rings Bulgaria were introduced during the opening ceremony, while subsequent events featured matches and tournaments pitting fighters from different national teams against one another.

This system helped establish Rings as a bridge between Japanese combat sports and fighters from overseas, particularly by bringing competitors from European and Eastern European martial arts scenes into regular competition in Japan. Rather than simply importing individual foreign wrestlers, Rings organized them into national teams and incorporated their existing combat-sports backgrounds into its events, creating a sustained international network of fighters who competed alongside and against Japanese Rings competitors. As the promotion moved toward legitimate mixed martial arts, this network became an important part of Rings' identity and its role in connecting the international combat sport scenes with the developing Japanese MMA scene. Among the foreign fighters who entered the Rings system and subsequently competed in other major Japanese and international promotions were Fedor Emelianenko, Ricardo Arona, Antônio Rodrigo Nogueira, Renato Sobral, Dan Henderson, Jeremy Horn, Alistair Overeem, Gilbert Yvel and Elvis Sinosic.

Rings also had significant connections with the emerging K-1 kickboxing scene, particularly through its Dutch fighters. Several fighters associated with Rings subsequently competed in K-1, including Peter Aerts, Alistair Overeem and Semmy Schilt. Aerts was a prominent participant in the inaugural 1993 K-1 World Grand Prix, while Overeem competed in Rings' 1999 King of Kings tournament before later appearing in K-1. Schilt likewise competed in Rings before becoming one of K-1's most successful heavyweight fighters. The overlap reflected the close connections between Rings' international fight network and the Dutch kickboxing scene, which supplied many of the elite heavyweights who became central to K-1 during the 1990s and 2000s. Aditionally, Seidokaikan, the organization of K-1 founder Kazuyoshi Ishii, also provided fighters for Rings, including later K-1 mainstays including Masaaki Satake and Nobuaki Kakuda. The concept of matching fighters from different martial arts backgrounds and nationalities of Rings was a source of inspiration when Ishii founded K-1 in 1993.

On June 27, 1998, Kiyoshi Tamura faced Tsuyoshi Kosaka at Rings: Fourth Fighting Integration in Tokyo. The bout lasted the full 30-minute time limit, ending in a draw. The bout was later regarded as a worked shoot, rather than a legitimate combat match. Wrestling Observer Newsletter journalist Dave Meltzer rated the match five stars, describing it as the best match of 1998 within the worked-shoot style. It is listed among Meltzer's five-star matches and is regarded as one of the notable bouts in the history of Fighting Network Rings.

Despite starting out as a shoot style professional wrestling promotion, Rings showcased primitive MMA fights, as early as 1991, and notably promoted shoot style wrestling matches alongside these legitimate fights on the same cards. Beginning in 1995, Rings increasingly focused on legitimate combat sports and MMA bouts, while occasionally continuing to feature worked shoot-style matches. In its early years, the promotion also often brought in fighters and professional wrestlers from Shooto, Pancrase, and Pro Wrestling Fujiwara Gumi to compete against Rings fighters.

=== Decline ===
Maeda retired from active competition in 1998, having his last match in 1999 against Olympic wrestling legend Aleksandr Karelin, leaving Kiyoshi Tamura as Rings' top star. With Rings now under his direction as a promoter rather than as an active competitor, the promotion abandoned its remaining worked matches in favor of fully competitive MMA. This transition culminating in the Rings King of Kings Tournament 1999 later that year, a 32-man international tournament featuring several prominent MMA fighters, including Dan Henderson, Antônio Rodrigo Nogueira, Renzo Gracie, Alistair Overeem, Renato Sobral, Jeremy Horn, Gilbert Yvel, Maurice Smith, Tsuyoshi Kohsaka and Kiyoshi Tamura. The tournament began in October 1999 and concluded in February 2000, with Henderson winning the final.

The transition coincided with the departure of several of Rings' established fighters and the emergence of a new generation of MMA competitors. However, the promotion subsequently struggled financially as Pride Fighting Championships grew into Japan's leading MMA promotion. Rings lost several of its successful foreign fighters to Pride, which was able to offer them larger purses, while attendance at Rings events declined due to a lack of marketable stars. Rings' financial difficulties were further exacerbated by its founder Akira Maeda's increasingly strained relationships with the Japanese wrestling and MMA industries, stemming in part from his notorious temper and repeated incidents of violence. Rings' financial difficulties were compounded when WOWOW reduced its funding and announced that it would not renew the promotion's television contract when it expired in March 2002. On December 27, 2001, Rings founder Akira Maeda announced the liquidation of his promotion, with the company's closure to take place after its final farewell event. Held in February 15, 2002, Rings: World Title Series Grand Final marked the end of the original Japanese promotion. Maeda did not attend the event, having been arrested the previous day on assault charges stemming from a May 2000 attack on Pancrase president Masami Ozaki. Maeda reportedly attacked Ozaki after suspecting that he was attempting to recruit Rings fighter Jeremy Horn.

Many Japanese Rings stars, including Masayuki Naruse, Wataru Sakata and Hiroyuki Ito, made the transition back into traditional puroresu (although Naruse continued to compete sporadically in MMA). Kiyoshi Tamura, Hiromitsu Kanehara, Yoshihisa Yamamoto and Tsuyoshi Kosaka continued competing in MMA, most notably for Pride. Mitsuya Nagai began a career in kickboxing before returning to traditional puroresu. The MMA promotion ZST was founded in November 2002 to accommodate former Japanese Rings fighters who remained competitors in mixed martial arts. Meanwhile, U-Style was founded by Kiyoshi Tamura in 2003 to preserve the shoot wrestling tradition of the original UWF and Rings, focusing on realistic but coreographed and predetermined professional wrestling rather than mixed martial arts. The promotion held events through the early 2000s, culminating in U-Style Axis on November 23, 2005, where Tamura defeated Josh Barnett by submission.

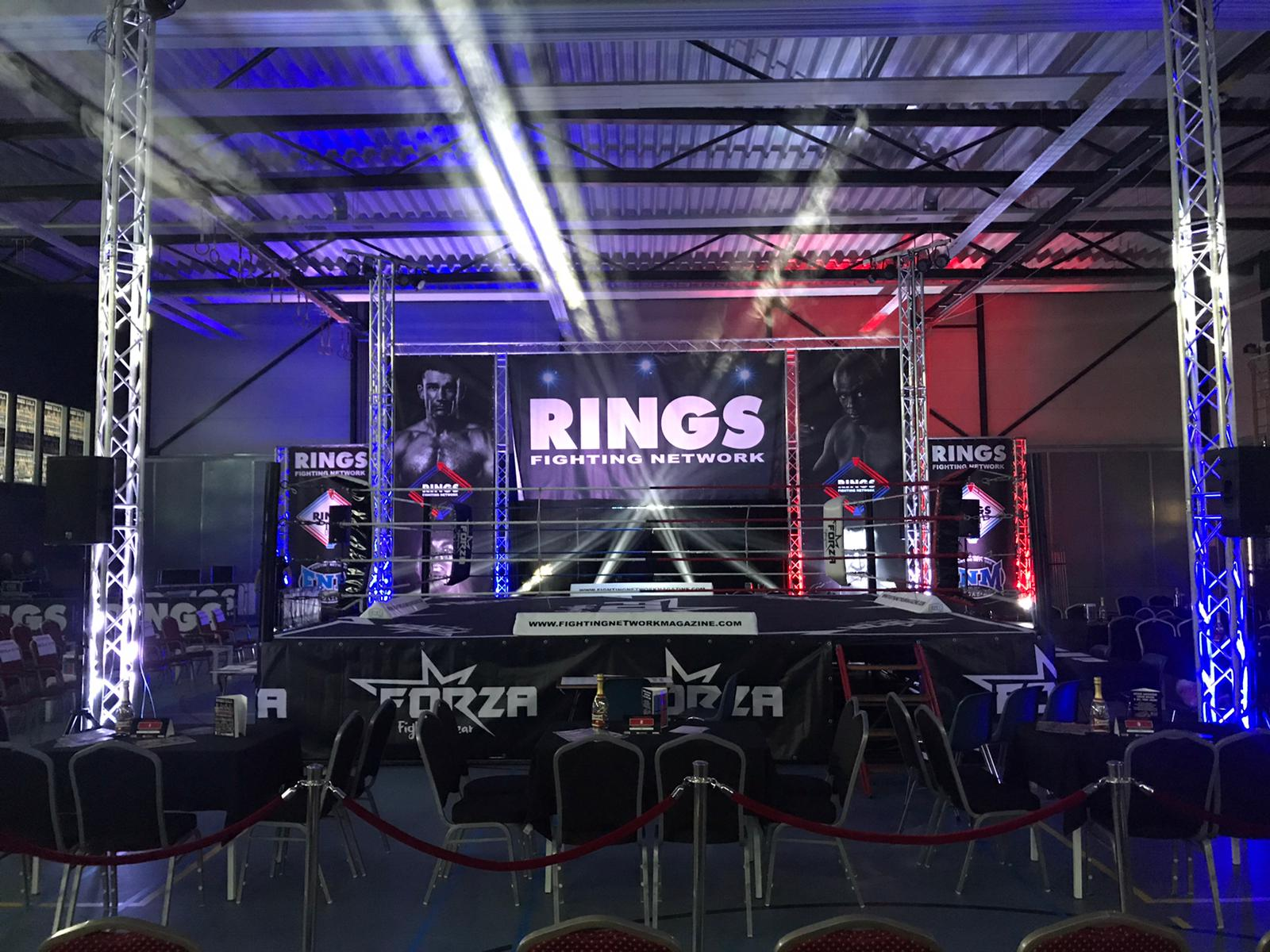
A RINGS Holland event in 2016

Rings Holland continued operating independently following the closure of the Japanese promotion. Founded in 1993 by Dutch martial artist Chris Dolman and promoter Milco Lambrecht as an affiliate of Rings Japan, the organization had promoted events in the Netherlands since 1995. Around 2005, Lambrecht took full control of Rings Holland, which continued to hold events under the Rings name, increasingly focusing on amateur kickboxing and developing fighters who would later compete in major promotions such as Glory Kickboxing.

=== Revival and The Outsider ===
After Rings, Maeda became involved with the Fighting and Entertainment Group (FEG), the Japanese combat sports promotion company behind K-1, where he became the supervisor of Hero's, FEG's mixed martial arts division. In 2008, FEG phased out Hero's to focus on the newly established Dream promotion. Following the dissolution of Hero's and his departure from FEG, Maeda revived the Rings brand for a new series of amateur MMA events named The Outsider, using the ruleset of Hero's. The series was created as a route into legitimate MMA for young, inexperienced fighters, often troubled youths, street fighters, and people from delinquent or gang backgrounds. The first Rings The Outsider event occurred on March 30, 2008. Over a dozen Outsider events have been held since.

The brand was resurrected once more on January 22, 2012 with Battle Genesis: Vol. 9; the event was sanctioned by fellow mixed martial arts promotion ZST. The previous Rings Battle Genesis event, Volume 8, took place on September 20, 2001. There were four events under this partnership: Battle Genesis Vol. 9, Reincarnation, Battle Genesis Vol. 10, and Vol. 2: Conquisito, and Rings/The Outsider: Volk Han Retirement Match.

Rings continued to promote MMA events in Japan through The Outsider series, although events became increasingly intermittent. In 2018, Maeda stated that The Outsider had been suspended due to a shortage of venues in the Tokyo metropolitan area caused by preparations for the 2020 Summer Olympics, and that he planned to resume the series with events in regional areas. The series subsequently returned and continued into the 2020s, with The Outsider 55 held in 2022. Maeda remained involved with the Rings brand, although he later moved away from regularly producing MMA events.

== Rules ==
Matches in Rings adhered to a 30 minute time limit and were winnable via a 10-count knockout, submission, TKO as ordained by the referee or ringside doctor, or judges should the time limit be reached. Its most notable addition was a points system; competitors would be allotted 10 points, and would lose one should they grab the ropes to force a submission break, or two should they be knocked down. Should the time limit be reached, the winner would be he who lost fewer points. Some matches would instead use a rounds system - 5 rounds of 3 minutes each - with a caveat that the match would immediately end were one fighter to be knocked down 3 times in the first round. The only prohibited techniques were punches to the face, punches to the groin, headbutts above the neck, toe kicks, finger-joint locks, strikes to the Adam's apple and strikes to a downed/kneeling opponent.

== Tournaments ==
=== Mega Battle Tournament ===
- Mega Battle Tournament 1992 (Oct 29, 1992 – Jan 23, 1993) – Chris Dolman
- Mega Battle Tournament 1993 (Oct 23, 1993 – Jan 21, 1994) – Akira Maeda
- Mega Battle Tournament 1994 (Sep 21, 1994 – Jan 25, 1995) – Volk Han
- Mega Battle Tournament 1995 (Oct 21, 1995 – Jan 24, 1996) – Akira Maeda
- Mega Battle Tournament 1996 (Oct 25, 1996 – Jan 22, 1997) – Volk Han
- Mega Battle Tournament 1997 (Oct 25, 1997 – Jan 21, 1998) – Kiyoshi Tamura
- Mega Battle Tournament 1998 (Oct 23, 1998 – Jan 23, 1999) – Team Georgia

=== King of Kings Tournament ===
- King of Kings Tournament 1999 (Oct 28, 1999 – Feb 26, 2000) – Dan Henderson
- King of Kings Tournament 2000 (Oct 9, 2000 – Feb 24, 2001) – Antônio Rodrigo Nogueira

=== Championship tournaments ===
- Light-Heavyweight Title Tournament 1997 (Note: This tournament was also known as the Tournament 21 Title.) (Mar 28 – Aug 13, 1997) – Masayuki Naruse
- Middleweight Title Tournament 2001 (Apr 20 – Aug 11, 2001) – Ricardo Arona
- Heavyweight Title Tournament 2001 (Apr 20 – Aug 11, 2001) – Fedor Emelianenko

=== Other tournaments ===
- Rising Stars Heavyweight Tournament 2000 (Jul 15 – Sep 30, 2000) – Bobby Hoffman
- Rising Stars Middleweight Tournament 2000 (Jul 15 – Sep 30, 2000) – Jeremy Horn
- Absolute Class Tournament 2001 (Oct 20, 2001 – Feb 15, 2002) – Fedor Emelianenko

== Championships ==
=== Openweight Championship ===
No.	Name	Date	Location	Notes
1	(Japan) Kiyoshi Tamura (def. Mikhail Illoukhine)	January 21, 1998 (Mega Battle Tournament 1997)	Tokyo, Japan	
2	(Georgia (country)) Tariel Bitsadze (def. Kiyoshi Tamura)	May 29, 1998 (Fighting Integration III)	Sapporo, Japan	
3	(Japan) Kiyoshi Tamura (def. Tariel Bitsadze)	May 22, 1999 (Rise III)	Tokyo, Japan	
4	(Netherlands) Gilbert Yvel (def. Kiyoshi Tamura)	April 20, 2000 (Millennium Combine)	Tokyo, Japan	
Title was vacated on June 13, 2000 when Yvel signed with Pride FC.
5	(Russia) Fedor Emelianenko (def. Christopher Haseman)	February 15, 2002 (World Title Series Grand Final)	Yokohama, Japan	Wins title on promotion's final event.
Title dissolved when original promotion closed on February 15, 2002.

=== Heavyweight Championship (+95 kg (209.4 lb)) ===
No.	Name	Date	Location	Notes
1	(Russia) Fedor Emelianenko (def. Renato Sobral)	August 11, 2001 (10th Anniversary)	Tokyo, Japan	
Title dissolved when original promotion closed on February 15, 2002.

=== Light-Heavyweight Championship (−95 kg (209.4 lb)) ===
No.	Name	Date	Location	Notes
1	(Japan) Masayuki Naruse (def. Christopher Haseman)	August 13, 1997 (Fighting Extension VI)	Kagoshima, Japan	
Naruse vacates the title on February 24, 2001; title dissolved when original promotion closed on February 15, 2002.

=== Middleweight Championship (−88 kg (194.0 lb)) ===
No.	Name	Date	Location	Notes
1	(Brazil) Ricardo Arona (def. Gustavo Ximu)	August 11, 2001 (10th Anniversary)	Tokyo, Japan	
Arona vacates the title on September 22, 2001 after signing with Pride FC; title dissolved when original promotion closed on February 15, 2002.

== Roster ==
=== Japanese ===
- Akira Maeda
- Mitsuya Nagai
- Yoshihisa Yamamoto
- Masayuki Naruse
- Tsuyoshi Kosaka
- Wataru Sakata
- Kiyoshi Tamura
- Kenichi Yamamoto
- Hiromitsu Kanehara
- Ryuki Ueyama
- Koichiro Kimura
- Hiroyuki Ito
- Yoshinori Nishi

=== Foreigners ===
Rings' system was largely much inspired by organizations such as the National Wrestling Alliance and FIFA, and featured fighters from different countries organized into stables. These foreign fighters would then compete against Rings' Japanese competitors and against each other.

==== Stables ====
- Netherlands – Dick Vrij, Hans Nijman, Gilbert Yvel, Joop Kasteel, Bob Schrijber, Herman Renting, Valentijn Overeem, Alistair Overeem, Chris Dolman
- Australia – Chris Haseman, Elvis Sinosic
- Bulgaria – Todor Todorov, Dimitar Petkov, Georgi Tonkov, Borislav Jeliazkov
- (Georgia (country)) Georgia – Zaza Tkeshelashvili, Tariel Bitsadze, Amiran Bitsadze
- Russia – Fedor Emelianenko, Andrei Kopylov, Bazigit Atajev, Nikolai Zuyev, Mikhail Illoukhine, Volk Han
- Brazil – Antônio Rodrigo Nogueira, Ricardo Arona, Renato Sobral, Gustavo Machado, Renzo Gracie
- United Kingdom – Lee Hasdell, Chris Watts, Dexter Casey, Paul Cahoon
- United States – Randy Couture, Dan Henderson, Kerry Schall, Bobby Hoffman, Jeremy Horn

== See also ==
- List of Fighting Network Rings events
