= Yuriy Kochkine =

Russian MMA fighter

- Born: December 21, 1963 (age 62)
- Nationality: Russian
- Division: Heavyweight
- Style: Judo, Karate, Sambo
- Team: Russian Top Team
- Years active: 1997 - 2005

Mixed martial arts record
- Total: 12
- Wins: 7
- By knockout: 1
- By submission: 3
- By decision: 3
- Losses: 4
- By knockout: 2
- By submission: 1
- By decision: 1
- Draws: 1

Other information
- Mixed martial arts record from Sherdog

Yuriy Kochkine (born 21 December 1963) is a Russian mixed martial artist. He competed in the Heavyweight division.

== Mixed martial arts record ==
Professional record breakdown
12 matches	7 wins	4 losses
By knockout	1	2
By submission	3	1
By decision	3	1
Draws	1	

Res.	Record	Opponent	Method	Event	Date	Round	Time	Location	Notes
Win	7–4–1	Milco Voorn	Submission (kimura)	Rings Russia: CIS vs. The World	August 20, 2005	1	N/A	Yekaterinburg, Sverdlovsk Oblast, Russia	
Loss	6–4–1	Mindaugas Kulikauskas	TKO (strikes)	Rings Lithuania: Bushido Rings 5: Shock	November 9, 2002	1	2:46	Vilnius, Lithuania	
Loss	6–3–1	Heath Herring	TKO (knees)	Pride 22: Beasts From The East 2	September 29, 2002	1	7:31	Nagoya, Japan	
Win	6–2–1	Yuri Zhernikov	Submission (armbar)	Universal Group: Remix 2001	May 5, 2001	1	N/A	Vladivostok, Primorsky Krai, Russia	
Win	5–2–1	Sergey Kaznovsky	KO (strikes)	Universal Group: Remix 2001	May 5, 2001	1	N/A	Vladivostok, Primorsky Krai, Russia	
Loss	4–2–1	Joop Kasteel	Decision (unanimous)	Rings Holland: Heroes Live Forever	January 28, 2001	2	5:00	Utrecht, Netherlands	
Win	4–1–1	Roman Kostennikov	Decision	Rings Russia: Russia vs. Bulgaria	May 21, 2000	2	5:00	Tula, Russia	
Win	3–1–1	Alistair Overeem	Decision (split)	Rings Russia: Russia vs. The World	May 20, 2000	2	5:00	Yekaterinburg, Sverdlovsk Oblast, Russia	
Loss	2–1–1	Antônio Rodrigo Nogueira	Technical Submission (armbar)	Rings: King of Kings 1999 Block A	October 28, 1999	1	0:40	Tokyo, Japan	
Win	2–0–1	Alistair Overeem	Decision (majority)	Rings: King of Kings 1999 Block A	October 28, 1999	2	5:00	Tokyo, Japan	
Win	1–0–1	Malcolm Nay	Submission (achilles lock)	Rings: Extension Fighting 7	September 26, 1997	1	4:33	Japan	
Draw	0–0–1	Ricardo Morais	Draw	Rings: Extension Fighting 4	June 21, 1997	1	20:00	Tokyo, Japan	

== See also ==
- List of male mixed martial artists
