= Antônio Rodrigo Nogueira =

Brazilian mixed martial arts fighter

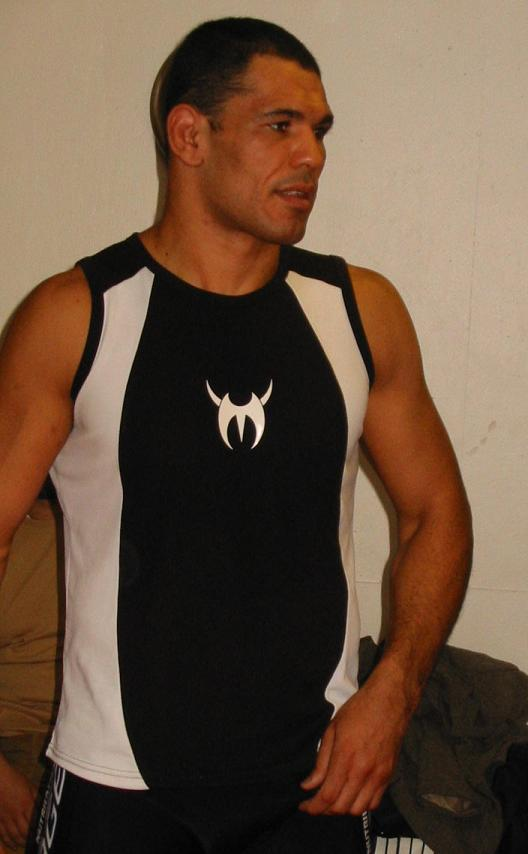
- Nogueira in 2004
- Born: 2 June 1976 (age 50); Vitória da Conquista, Bahia, Brazil
- Other names: Minotauro
- Height: 6 ft 3 in (191 cm)
- Weight: 240 lb (109 kg; 17 st 2 lb)
- Division: Heavyweight
- Reach: 78 in (198 cm)
- Stance: Orthodox
- Fighting out of: Rio de Janeiro, Brazil
- Team: Brazilian Top Team (1999–2006); Black House (2006–2015); Team Nogueira; Internacional
- Rank: 5th degree black belt in Brazilian Jiu-Jitsu under Ricardo De la Riva; Black belt in Judo
- Years active: 1999–2015 (MMA)

Mixed martial arts record
- Total: 46
- Wins: 34
- By knockout: 3
- By submission: 21
- By decision: 10
- Losses: 10
- By knockout: 3
- By submission: 2
- By decision: 5
- Draws: 1
- No contests: 1

Other information
- Occupation: Mixed martial arts fighter, contracted to the Ultimate Fighting Championship
- Children: 1
- Notable relatives: Antônio Rogério Nogueira, brother
- Notable students: Anderson Silva, José Aldo, Junior dos Santos, Patricky Freire, Patricio Freire, Lyoto Machida
- Mixed martial arts record from Sherdog

Antônio Rodrigo Nogueira (Brazilian Portuguese pronunciation: [ɐ̃ˈtoni.u ʁoˈdɾiɡu noˈɡejɾɐ, ɐ̃ˈtonju -]; born 2 June 1976), better known as Minotauro or Big Nog, is a Brazilian retired mixed martial artist. He competed in the heavyweight division of the Ultimate Fighting Championship (UFC), where he is a former Interim UFC Heavyweight Champion. He is the twin brother of UFC fighter Antônio Rogério Nogueira. Nogueira rose to prominence in Japanese promotions Fighting Network RINGS where he won the 2000 RINGS King of Kings tournament, and later with Pride Fighting Championships, where he was the first Pride Heavyweight Champion from November 2001 to March 2003, as well as a 2004 PRIDE FC Heavyweight Grand Prix Finalist. He is one of only three men to have held championship titles in both Pride Fighting Championships and the Ultimate Fighting Championship (the others being Maurício Rua and Mark Coleman).

== Early life ==
Born in the town of Vitória da Conquista, Brazil, Nogueira started training in judo at the age of 4, boxing at 14 and Brazilian jiu-jitsu at 18. At age 10, he was accidentally run over by a truck and fell into a four-day coma, losing a rib and part of his liver, and was hospitalized for eleven months. As a result of the accident, he has a large scar, including a noticeable indentation, on his lower back.

== Mixed martial arts career ==
Nogueira made his mixed martial arts (MMA) debut in the World Extreme Fighting promotion, which often held events in southern parts of the United States. He won his first two fights by submission and then won the WEF Heavyweight Superfight Championship in his 5th pro fight against veteran Jeremy Horn. A few years after his MMA debut, Nogueira started training with the Brazilian Top Team.

=== Rings ===
==== Rings: King of Kings 1999 ====
Nogueira debuted in Fighting Network Rings by taking part in the King of Kings 1999 tournament. He quickly submitted Valentijn Overeem and Yuriy Kochkine before clashing with middle-aged sambo champion Andrei Kopylov. Nogueira avoided a kimura lock attempt through the first round and controlled Kopylov for some minutes, before switching to stand-up in the second round and landing punches for the split decision win. In the next match, however, Nogueira was eliminated by American wrestling champion Dan Henderson in a controversial fight, as it was believed that the Brazilian had controlled the match much more than Henderson.

==== Kohsaka fight ====
Nogueira's next fight was against Japanese star Tsuyoshi "TK" Kohsaka. The bout was back and forth, with Nogueira repeatedly gaining dominant position and striking with short punches, only for his opponent to consistently reverse him, blocking the Brazilian's takedowns and striking as well when possible. After three rounds, the match was ruled a draw.

==== Rings: King of Kings 2000 ====
At King of Kings 2000, Nogueira was invited back to Rings. He submitted Achmed Labasanov before facing another Japanese name in the form of Kiyoshi Tamura. Nogueira was able to take him down and threaten him with submissions, but the Japanese fighter kept defending them and coming back at openings. Finally, the second round saw Nogueira win using an armbar.

His third match in the tournament was against another sambo champion, Volk Han, who was almost twice Nogueira's age. Han proved difficult to submit, but Nogueira controlled most of the match. After a flying kimura attempt by the Russian, Nogueira countered with an omoplata/ankle hold combination, until the match went to the judges' decision. The unanimous decision was given to the Brazilian, who advanced to the next round to face Hiromitsu Kanehara. Noguiera won the fight by submission. His final opponent in the tournament was Valentijn Overeem. Nogueira made Overeem tap out quickly and won the King of Kings tournament.

=== Pride FC ===
==== Early PRIDE career and heavyweight championship ====
Following the end of Akira Maeda's Rings federation, Nogueira was signed by Pride Fighting Championships. He debuted in July 2001 at Pride 15, quickly submitting Gary Goodridge by triangle choke. At Pride 16, he submitted UFC and Pride Grand Prix champion Mark Coleman by triangle armbar.

Nogueira was crowned as the inaugural Pride World Heavyweight Champion after defeating Heath Herring by decision at PRIDE 17. The fast-paced bout, which saw Nogueira's superiority at both grappling and striking, was considered by some the best heavyweight MMA fight of all time.

Nogueira next defeated Enson Inoue via technical submission due to a triangle choke and then fought for Antonio Inoki's UFO organization, scoring his first MMA KO victory against Sanae Kikuta.

==== Bouts with Sapp, Schilt and Henderson ====
Nogueira then represented Pride at a co-promotion with K-1, Pride Shockwave. He was initially offered a kickboxing bout against K-1 fighter Mark Hunt, but he proposed instead to fight two separate matches under mixed martial arts and kickboxing rules respectively, which Hunt refused. Nogueira then to fight another K-1 super heavyweight, former American football player Bob Sapp, who outweighed Nogueira by 127 pounds. Due to this, Nogueira asked for special rules that banned knee strikes to a grounded opponent.

The fight soon became a brutal exhibition of technical skill against raw strength, as mere seconds into the match, Sapp would stop Nogueira's first takedown attempt with a sound piledriver which almost ended the fight. The same outcome repeated itself several times, with Nogueira taking several powerbombs and heavy punches every time his huge antagonist managed to power out of his submission attempts. At the end, however, Sapp's stamina started to falter, allowing a very worn out Nogueira to mount him and finally submit him with an armbar.

After defeating Sapp, Dutch kickboxing champion and former King of Pancrase Semmy Schilt was his next opponent. Nogueira scored another victory by triangle choke. He then avenged his only loss against Dan Henderson, when he armbarred him in the 3rd round after Henderson displayed great submission defense for the first two rounds.

==== Title bouts ====
Nogueira's first Pride title defense was against Russian sambo champion and Volk Han apprentice Fedor Emelianenko at Pride 25. Nogueira suffered his second career loss, a judges' decision after Emelianenko dominated the fight with his characteristic ground-and-pound through the guard. In his next fight, Nogueira won a decision against former UFC heavyweight champion Ricco Rodriguez. Though Rodriguez scored takedowns and maintained top position, Pride's fight-scoring was determined primarily by "effort to finish the fight by KO or submission," and Nogueira's multiple near-submission attempts won him the decision victory.

In November 2003, with heavyweight champion Emelianenko unable to fight due to injuries, Pride elected to crown an interim champion, so top contenders Nogueira and Mirko Cro Cop were matched up. Cro Cop dominated the first round with his superior striking and a left high kick which knocked Nogueira down in the very end of the round, but in the second round, Nogueira secured a takedown and rolled into an armbar to submit Cro Cop.

==== 2004 Grand Prix ====
On 25 April 2004, at Pride Total Elimination 2004, the first round of the 2004 Heavyweight Grand Prix was held. Nogueira faced the unbeaten professional wrestler and former judoka Hirotaka Yokoi, whom he submitted with the debut of his anaconda choke. He then repeated the move against Heath Herring in the next round to advance to the semi-finals where he defeated Sergei Kharitonov to again face Fedor Emelianenko in the finals. The fight was markedly different from their first, with Nogueira able to avoid the damage he suffered from ground-and-pound in their first meeting. However, the bout was stopped when Emelianenko suffered a cut after an accidental head-butt and could not continue, resulting in a no-contest. Another rematch was required to determine the tournament champion and was scheduled for Pride Shockwave 2004 on 31 December 2004. In the rematch as in the first bout, Nogueira suffered another unanimous decision loss to Emelianenko after being dominated in the standing positions and being controlled on the ground.

At Pride Critical Countdown 2005, Nogueira defeated Polish Olympic judoka Pawel Nastula by strikes, and following this, at Pride 31 he beat professional wrestler and fighter Kiyoshi Tamura by armbar for the second time.

==== 2006 Grand Prix ====
He then entered the 2006 Pride Open Weight Grand Prix, progressing to the semi-final by defeating fellow Brazilians Zuluzinho and Fabrício Werdum. In the semi-final, he faced the American catch wrestler Josh Barnett and lost a controversial split decision in which many people thought Nogueira had won the fight, as both had landed damaging blows and submission attempts without managing to secure a victory. Barnett went on to face Mirko Cro Cop in the finals, Losing to Cro Cro after submitting to punches and kicks to the face. Nogueira avenged the loss to Barnett with a dominant unanimous decision win in their rematch at Pride Shockwave 2006.

In an interview with Sherdog.com, Nogueira stated that the best moments of his career were against Bob Sapp and Mirko Cro Cop, both matches he won fighting in Pride.

=== Ultimate Fighting Championship ===
At UFC Fight Night 9 which took place on 5 April 2007, Nogueira was in attendance and was sitting cage side with UFC president Dana White. It was subsequently announced at UFC 69, by White, that Nogueira had joined the UFC. He was promoted initially as simply "Minotauro" Nogueira, much like the UFC's promotion of Mirko Filipović as Mirko "Cro Cop" and Quinton Jackson as "Rampage" Jackson. In June 2007, he officially left Brazilian Top Team and joined Black House.

His debut in the Octagon was a third fight with Heath Herring at UFC 73, promoted under various combinations of his name and nickname, but was officially introduced to the audience under his full name and nickname. Nogueira once again defeated Herring, via unanimous decision. During the first round, Herring landed a head kick that sent Nogueira to the canvas, in which unofficial judge Eddie Bravo thought the fight could have been stopped. Herring let Nogueira get back to his feet, and Nogueira was then able to recover and come back with a dominant decision victory.

==== UFC Interim Heavyweight Championship ====
It was announced during the UFC 79 broadcast and subsequent press conference that Nogueira would be fighting former long time UFC Heavyweight Champion Tim Sylvia at UFC 81 for the Interim UFC Heavyweight Championship. Nogueira defeated Sylvia in the third round with a guillotine choke to become the Interim UFC Heavyweight Champion. During the fight Sylvia knocked Nogueira down with punches. After pulling Sylvia into his half guard in the third round, Nogueira quickly secured a sweep and attempted an armbar which he missed but immediately transitioned into a guillotine choke as Sylvia tried to regain his feet thus mounting a come from behind victory. Nogueira's coach, Amaury Bitetti, said that Nogueira had trained for the guillotine well beforehand.

Nogueira and former UFC Heavyweight Champion Frank Mir were the coaches for the eighth season of The Ultimate Fighter (TUF), which premiered on 17 September 2008, on Spike TV. Both winners of The Ultimate Fighter, season 8, light heavyweight Ryan Bader and lightweight Efraín Escudero, were members of Team Nogueira. After the season concluded, coaches Nogueira and Mir met at UFC 92 for the Interim UFC Heavyweight Championship. Mir won a one-sided fight in the second round via TKO due to punches, showing much improved striking by knocking Nogueira down twice in the first round. Herb Dean stopped the match at 1:54 of the second round. The loss marked the first time Nogueira had been stopped in his career.

Two days after the fight, Dana White revealed in an interview that "Nogueira had just gotten over a Staph infection." Nogueira himself verified this fact several months later in his own interview, stating that he had a Staph infection "20 days before the fight, [requiring] 5 days in the hospital." When asked if this infection affected his fight, he answered: "For sure." In addition to this significant illness, his knee was injured during training for which he had surgery in February 2009. Despite these legitimate handicaps, Nogueira offered strong praise for Frank Mir's performance, with particular credit given to Mir's ability to maintain "very good distance."

==== Non-title bouts ====
The UFC next wanted to schedule Nogueira to face UFC Hall of Famer and former UFC Heavyweight and Light Heavyweight Champion Randy Couture at UFC 97, but Couture had to turn down the fight due to elbow surgery in January 2009. Couture later agreed to fight Nogueira at UFC 102 in Portland, Oregon. Nogueira defeated Couture via unanimous decision (30–27, 30–27, and 29–28). Nogueira showed much improved sharpness on his feet, and displayed his excellent chin by walking through many of Couture's strikes while still throwing punches, eventually gaining the better of the exchanges as he scored two knockdowns of Couture in the fight. Although taken down twice, Nogueira swept from guard on both occasions (after some time on his back) to gain the full mount over Couture. On the floor, Nogueira threatened with two submissions, first with a D'Arce choke and later with an arm-triangle choke.

Nogueira was expected to face undefeated prospect Cain Velasquez on 2 January 2010, at UFC 108, but again, Nogueira caught another severe staph infection cancelling the bout. The bout instead took place on 21 February 2010, at UFC 110 in Sydney, Australia. During the bout, Nogueira was out-boxed as Velasquez landed an uppercut-right hook combo that dropped Nogueira early in the first round. Velasquez followed up with five clean shots on the ground, prompting referee Herb Dean to stop the contest, in which Velasquez earned a KO victory. At the time, Nogueira had been knocked out in two of his last three fights.

Nogueira was to face Frank Mir on 25 September 2010, at UFC 119 in a rematch from the championship bout at UFC 92. Nogueira pulled out of this fight in order to undergo needed surgery on both of his hips as well as his knee and was replaced by Mirko Cro Cop. He stated on 15 May 2011, that he would fight at the UFC's return to Rio de Janeiro in Brazil. Nogueira defeated The Ultimate Fighter alumnus Brendan Schaub by knockout due to punches in the first round on 27 August 2011, at UFC 134 in his home-city of Rio de Janeiro, Brazil. It was his first fight in over 16 months (and was billed as his "return fight") and earned him his first Knockout of the Night bonus. He celebrated his victory by sitting on top of the octagon fence and displaying a Brazilian national flag with Sport Club Internacional's emblem added to the center of the flag.

Nogueira faced Frank Mir in a rematch on 10 December 2011, at UFC 140. After close early exchanges and a lot of work against the cage, the two separated, and Nogueira rocked Mir with a hard overhand right, jab combo. After Mir fell to the ground, Nogueira continued with ground and pound before attempting a guillotine choke. Mir was able to get out of this and during a scramble, ended in side control and locked up a kimura. Nogueira managed to roll Mir, only to be reversed himself. Mir stepped his right leg over the face of Nogueira and cranked the kimura, causing Nogueira's right humerus to break, thus ending the fight at 3:38 of round 1.

Nogueira was expected to face Cheick Kongo on 21 July 2012, at UFC 149. However, Nogueira pulled out of the bout, citing that his arm injury had not healed enough to resume the proper training and was replaced by Shawn Jordan. Nogueira fought Dave Herman on 13 October 2012, at UFC 153. He won the bout when he submitted Herman in the second round with an armbar. The finish earned him his first Submission of the Night honors.

==== Losing streak and retirement ====
Nogueira coached opposite Fabrício Werdum on the second season of The Ultimate Fighter: Brazil. The two met in a rematch at the conclusion of the season, on 8 June 2013, at UFC on Fuel TV 10. This fight was a rematch of their first fight in PRIDE in which Nogueira won by unanimous decision back in 2006. After a back-and-forth first round, Nogueira lost via submission to an armbar in the second round.

Nogueira faced Roy Nelson on 11 April 2014, in the main event at UFC Fight Night 39. After dropping Nogueira several times with punches in the first round, Nelson finished the fight via knockout with an overhand right.

On 17 June 2014, Nogueira underwent successful surgery to repair a partial ACL tear of his right knee. On 9 February 2015, it was announced Nogueira would replace Anderson Silva as a head coach on The Ultimate Fighter: Brazil 4, after Silva was removed following his failed drug test.

In March 2015, Nogueira revealed in an interview with Combate that he had undergone stem cell therapy on his elbows, hips and knees. Nogueira said,

They have a clinic in Kansas where they work with stem cells. What they do is they remove some cells from fat out of your back and then inject them in your joints. I did it on my elbows, my hips and knees. It stimulates cartilage growth. It's pretty cutting edge technique. I'm responding really well so far. It's been helping a lot with my pain. I'm still doing physiotherapy, which is responsible for curing my hips, but I'm now doing this to make it even stronger. I had a break between my last fight and The Ultimate Fighter shootings, so I decided to go for it.

Nogueira also confessed a desire to fight Frank Mir for a third time saying,

In two weeks I'll be cleared to train freely again. First, I will get my body strong enough so I can train and be 100% ready to fight. I intend to fight at UFC 190 in August. I wanted to come back at the TUF finale card, but I'm afraid there won't be enough time. I'll definitely be ready in August. The UFC told me they would put me in a card in August. They didn't say which one, but I'm sure it'll be the one in Rio. I still don't have an opponent. They said there were three different guys I could be fighting, but I can't comment on that. I don't have any preferences really. I just want to come back and fight, but I would like to face Frank Mir again before the end of the year.

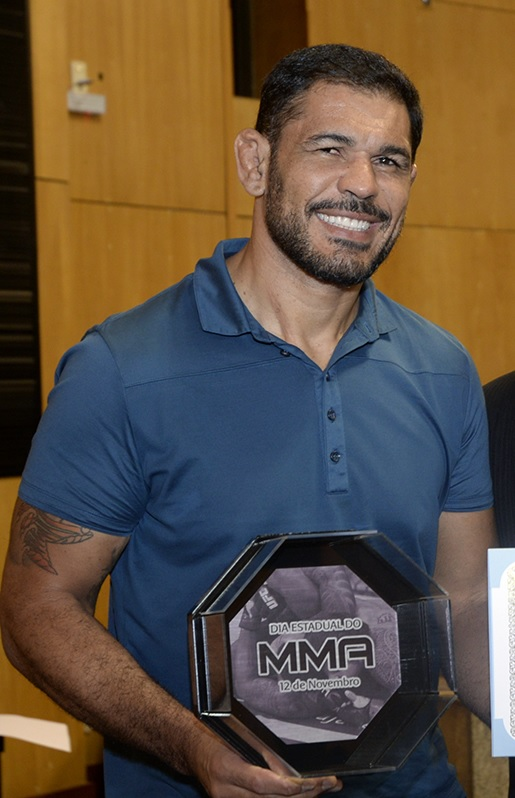
Nogueira in 2015

In turn, the promotion balked at setting up a third bout with Mir. Instead, Nogueira next faced Stefan Struve at UFC 190 on 1 August 2015. He lost the fight by unanimous decision. After the fight, UFC president Dana White said he would no longer offer Nogueira fights, effectively ending his UFC career. White also indicated that he would instead offer Nogueira a position within the company. In turn, Nogueira confirmed his intention to retire.

== Fighting style ==
Nogueira was universally known as a grappler, drawing strength from his Brazilian jiu-jitsu skills. However, he also had a well-rounded set of MMA abilities, relying on outstanding boxing and a competent takedown game. He was especially famous for his affinity to fighting from the bottom, utilizing an offensive open guard with masterful skill. His trademark moves were submissions like armbars, triangle chokes and variations of both, along with more exotic techniques. His ground game was considered "on a completely different level" from the rest of the sport during his time as an MMA competitor. Nogueira was also known for his solid chin and extreme ability to take punishment, which was showcased in his fights against Bob Sapp, Fedor Emilianenko and Mirko Cro Cop.

== Other media ==
From 2004 to 2005, Nogueira acted in Yomiuri TV's sitcom television series Africa no Tsume, playing the character "Nogueira." He cameoed in The Expendables along with his twin brother.

In 2023, Nogueira began working as a member of the commentary team for UFC Fight Pass Brazil.

== Personal life ==
Nogueira has one daughter. On 23 August 2011, Nogueira established a partnership with Brazilian football club Internacional to represent the club's brand in the UFC. In an interview for SporTV, Nogueira said, "I'll do my best to represent Internacional in the best possible way. Now I am 100% Internacional."

== Championships and accomplishments ==
=== Mixed martial arts ===
- Fighting Network RINGS
  - 2000 RINGS King of Kings Tournament Winner
- PRIDE Fighting Championship
  - Pride Heavyweight Championship (One time, first)
  - Interim Pride Heavyweight Championship (One time)
  - 2004 PRIDE Heavyweight Grand Prix Runner-Up
  - 2006 PRIDE Open-Weight Grand Prix Semi-Finalist
  - Tied (Kazushi Sakuraba) for most submission wins in PRIDE FC history (11)
- Ultimate Fighting Championship
  - UFC Hall of Fame (Pioneer Wing, Class of 2016)
  - Interim UFC Heavyweight Championship (One time)
  - Fight of the Night (Two times)
  - Knockout of the Night (One time)
  - 2023 UFC Forrest Griffin Community Award
  - UFC.com Awards
    - 2008: Ranked #5 Submission of the Year vs. Tim Sylvia
    - 2009: Ranked #2 Fight of the Year vs. Randy Couture
- World Extreme Fighting
  - WEF Heavyweight Superfight Champion (One Time)
- FanSided
  - 2000s #10 Ranked MMA Fighter of the Decade
- Sports Illustrated
  - 2008 Comeback of the Year vs. Tim Sylvia at UFC 81
- Sherdog
  - Mixed Martial Arts Hall of Fame
- Wrestling Observer Newsletter
  - 2002 Fighter of the Year
- Black Belt Magazine
  - 2002 NHB Fighter of the Year
- Inside Fights
  - 2009 Fight of the Year - vs. Randy Couture on 29 August
- MMA Fighting
  - 2002 Heavyweight Fighter of the Year
  - 2002 Fight of the Year vs. Bob Sapp at Pride Shockwave
  - 2003 Fight of the Year vs. Mirko Cro Cop on 9 November
  - 2006 Fight of the Year vs. Josh Barnett at Pride Shockwave 2006
  - 2008 #3 Ranked UFC Fight of the Year vs. Tim Sylvia at UFC 81
- Fight Matrix
  - 2001 Fighter of the Year
  - 2003 Most Noteworthy Match of the Year vs. Fedor Emelianenko on 16 March
  - 2004 Most Noteworthy Match of the Year vs. Fedor Emelianenko on 31 December

=== Submission grappling ===
- ADCC World Submission Wrestling Championships
  - 2000 ADCC – 99 kg+: Quarter finals
- CBJJ World Championships
  - 1999 Black Belt Absoluto: 3rd Place
  - 1997 Purple Belt Pesadissimo: 2nd place
- CBJJ Pan-American Championships
  - 1999 Brown Belt Pesadissimo: 1st Place
  - 1999 Brown Belt Absoluto: 1st place
- CBJJ Brazilian Championships
  - 1998 Brown Belt Pesadissimo: 1st Place
  - 1997 Purple Belt Super Pesado: 3rd Place
  - 1996 Blue Belt Absoluto: 1st Place

== Mixed martial arts record ==
Professional record breakdown
46 matches	34 wins	10 losses
By knockout	3	3
By submission	21	2
By decision	10	5
Draws	1	
No contests	1	

Res.	Record	Opponent	Method	Event	Date	Round	Time	Location	Notes
Loss	34–10–1 (1)	Stefan Struve	Decision (unanimous)	UFC 190	1 August 2015	3	5:00	Rio de Janeiro, Brazil	
Loss	34–9–1 (1)	Roy Nelson	KO (punch)	UFC Fight Night: Nogueira vs. Nelson	11 April 2014	1	3:37	Abu Dhabi, United Arab Emirates	
Loss	34–8–1 (1)	Fabrício Werdum	Submission (armbar)	UFC on Fuel TV: Nogueira vs. Werdum	8 June 2013	2	2:41	Fortaleza, Brazil	
Win	34–7–1 (1)	Dave Herman	Submission (armbar)	UFC 153	13 October 2012	2	4:31	Rio de Janeiro, Brazil	Submission of the Night.
Loss	33–7–1 (1)	Frank Mir	Technical Submission (kimura)	UFC 140	10 December 2011	1	3:38	Toronto, Ontario, Canada	
Win	33–6–1 (1)	Brendan Schaub	KO (punches)	UFC 134	27 August 2011	1	3:09	Rio de Janeiro, Brazil	Knockout of the Night.
Loss	32–6–1 (1)	Cain Velasquez	KO (punches)	UFC 110	21 February 2010	1	2:20	Sydney, Australia	UFC Heavyweight title eliminator.
Win	32–5–1 (1)	Randy Couture	Decision (unanimous)	UFC 102	29 August 2009	3	5:00	Portland, Oregon, United States	Fight of the Night. Fight of the Year (2009).
Loss	31–5–1 (1)	Frank Mir	TKO (punches)	UFC 92	27 December 2008	2	1:54	Las Vegas, Nevada, United States	Lost the interim UFC Heavyweight Championship.
Win	31–4–1 (1)	Tim Sylvia	Submission (guillotine choke)	UFC 81	2 February 2008	3	1:28	Las Vegas, Nevada, United States	Won the interim UFC Heavyweight Championship. Fight of the Night.
Win	30–4–1 (1)	Heath Herring	Decision (unanimous)	UFC 73	7 July 2007	3	5:00	Sacramento, California, United States	
Win	29–4–1 (1)	Josh Barnett	Decision (unanimous)	Pride FC - Shockwave 2006	31 December 2006	3	5:00	Saitama, Japan	
Loss	28–4–1 (1)	Josh Barnett	Decision (split)	Pride FC - Final Conflict Absolute	10 September 2006	2	5:00	Saitama, Japan	2006 Pride Open-Weight Grand Prix Semifinals.
Win	28–3–1 (1)	Fabrício Werdum	Decision (unanimous)	Pride FC - Critical Countdown Absolute	1 July 2006	3	5:00	Saitama, Japan	2006 Pride Open-Weight Grand Prix Quarterfinals.
Win	27–3–1 (1)	Wagner Martins	Submission (armbar)	Pride FC - Total Elimination Absolute	5 May 2006	1	2:17	Osaka, Japan	2006 Pride Open-Weight Grand Prix Opening Round.
Win	26–3–1 (1)	Kiyoshi Tamura	Submission (armbar)	Pride 31 - Dreamers	26 February 2006	1	2:24	Saitama, Japan	
Win	25–3–1 (1)	Pawel Nastula	TKO (punches)	Pride Critical Countdown 2005	26 June 2005	1	8:38	Saitama, Japan	
Loss	24–3–1 (1)	Fedor Emelianenko	Decision (unanimous)	Pride Shockwave 2004	31 December 2004	3	5:00	Saitama, Japan	For the Pride Heavyweight Championship. 2004 Pride Heavyweight Grand Prix Tournament.
NC	24–2–1 (1)	Fedor Emelianenko	NC (accidental clash of heads)	Pride Final Conflict 2004	15 August 2004	1	3:52	Saitama, Japan	For the Pride Heavyweight Championship. 2004 Pride Heavyweight Grand Prix Final.
Win	24–2–1	Sergei Kharitonov	Decision (unanimous)	Pride Final Conflict 2004	15 August 2004	2	5:00	Saitama, Japan	2004 Pride Heavyweight Grand Prix Semifinals.
Win	23–2–1	Heath Herring	Submission (anaconda choke)	Pride Critical Countdown 2004	20 June 2004	2	0:30	Saitama, Japan	2004 Pride Heavyweight Grand Prix Quarterfinals.
Win	22–2–1	Hirotaka Yokoi	Submission (anaconda choke)	Pride Total Elimination 2004	25 April 2004	2	1:25	Saitama, Japan	2004 Pride Heavyweight Grand Prix Opening Round.
Win	21–2–1	Mirko Cro Cop	Submission (armbar)	Pride Final Conflict 2003	9 November 2003	2	1:45	Tokyo, Japan	Won the interim Pride Heavyweight Championship. Fight of the Year (2003).
Win	20–2–1	Ricco Rodriguez	Decision (unanimous)	Pride Total Elimination 2003	10 August 2003	3	5:00	Saitama, Japan	
Loss	19–2–1	Fedor Emelianenko	Decision (unanimous)	Pride 25	16 March 2003	3	5:00	Yokohama, Japan	Lost the Pride Heavyweight Championship.
Win	19–1–1	Dan Henderson	Submission (armbar)	Pride 24	23 December 2002	3	1:49	Fukuoka, Japan	
Win	18–1–1	Semmy Schilt	Submission (triangle choke)	Pride 23	24 November 2002	1	6:36	Tokyo, Japan	
Win	17–1–1	Bob Sapp	Submission (armbar)	Pride Shockwave	28 August 2002	2	4:03	Tokyo, Japan	
Win	16–1–1	Sanae Kikuta	KO (punch)	UFO-Legend	8 August 2002	2	0:29	Tokyo, Japan	
Win	15–1–1	Enson Inoue	Technical Submission (triangle choke)	Pride 19	24 February 2002	1	6:17	Saitama, Japan	
Win	14–1–1	Heath Herring	Decision (unanimous)	Pride 17	3 November 2001	3	5:00	Tokyo, Japan	Won the inaugural Pride Heavyweight Championship.
Win	13–1–1	Mark Coleman	Submission (triangle armbar)	Pride 16	24 September 2001	1	6:10	Osaka, Japan	
Win	12–1–1	Gary Goodridge	Submission (triangle choke)	Pride 15	29 July 2001	1	2:37	Saitama, Japan	
Win	11–1–1	Valentijn Overeem	Submission (arm-triangle choke)	Rings: King of Kings 2000 Final	24 February 2001	1	1:20	Tokyo, Japan	Won the 2000 King of Kings Tournament.
Win	10–1–1	Hiromitsu Kanehara	Submission (rear-naked choke)	Rings: King of Kings 2000 Final	24 February 2001	2	0:20	Tokyo, Japan	2000 King of Kings Tournament Semifinals.
Win	9–1–1	Volk Han	Decision (unanimous)	Rings: King of Kings 2000 Final	24 February 2001	2	5:00	Tokyo, Japan	2000 King of Kings Tournament Quarterfinals.
Win	8–1–1	Kiyoshi Tamura	Submission (armbar)	Rings: King of Kings 2000 Block A	9 October 2000	2	2:29	Tokyo, Japan	2000 King of Kings Tournament 2nd round.
Win	7–1–1	Achmed Labasanov	Submission (armbar)	Rings: King of Kings 2000 Block A	9 October 2000	1	1:38	Tokyo, Japan	2000 King of Kings Tournament 1st round.
Draw	6–1–1	Tsuyoshi Kohsaka	Draw	Rings: Millennium Combine 3	23 August 2000	2	5:00	Osaka, Japan	
Loss	6–1	Dan Henderson	Decision (split)	Rings: King of Kings 1999 Final	26 February 2000	3	5:00	Tokyo, Japan	1999 King of Kings Tournament Semifinals.
Win	6–0	Andrei Kopylov	Decision (split)	Rings: King of Kings 1999 Final	26 February 2000	2	5:00	Tokyo, Japan	1999 King of Kings Tournament Quarterfinals.
Win	5–0	Jeremy Horn	Decision (unanimous)	WEF 8: Goin' Platinum	15 January 2000	3	8:00	Rome, Georgia, United States	Won the WEF Heavyweight Superfight Championship.
Win	4–0	Yuriy Kochkine	Technical Submission (armbar)	Rings: King of Kings 1999 Block A	28 October 1999	1	0:40	Tokyo, Japan	1999 King of Kings Tournament 2nd round.
Win	3–0	Valentijn Overeem	Technical Submission (americana)	Rings: King of Kings 1999 Block A	28 October 1999	1	1:51	Tokyo, Japan	1999 King of Kings Tournament 1st round.
Win	2–0	Nate Schroeder	Submission (armbar)	WEF 7: Stomp in the Swamp	9 October 1999	1	1:52	Kenner, Louisiana, United States	
Win	1–0	David Dodd	Submission (kimura)	World Extreme Fighting 5	12 June 1999	1	3:12	DeLand, Florida, United States	

== Pay-per-view bouts ==
No.	Event	Fight	Date	Venue	City	PPV Buys
1.	UFC 81	Nogueira vs. Sylvia	2 February 2008	Mandalay Bay Events Center	Las Vegas, Nevada, United States	650,000
2.	UFC 102	Couture vs. Nogueira	29 August 2009	Rose Garden Arena	Portland, Oregon, United States	435,000
3.	UFC 110	Nogueira vs. Velasquez	21 February 2010	Acer Arena	Sydney, New South Wales, Australia	215,000

== See also ==
- List of current UFC fighters
- List of male mixed martial artists

Awards and achievements
Vacant Title last held by Andrei Arlovski	2nd UFC Interim Heavyweight Champion; 2 February 2008 – 27 December 2008	Succeeded by Frank Mir
New championship	1st Pride FC Interim Heavyweight Champion; 9 November 2003 – 31 December 2004	Lost unification bout against Fedor Emelianenko
New championship	1st Pride FC Heavyweight Champion; 3 November 2001 – 16 March 2003	Succeeded by Fedor Emelianenko
Preceded by Dan Henderson	2nd RINGS King of Kings Tournament winner February 24, 2001	
