= 2001 in Pancrase =

Mixed martial arts events

Information
- First date: February 4, 2001
- Last date: December 1, 2001

Events
- Total events: 13

Fights
- Total fights: 83
- Title fights: 4

Chronology
2000 in Pancrase	2001 in Pancrase	2002 in Pancrase

The year 2001 was the ninth year in the history of Pancrase, a mixed martial arts promotion based in Japan. In 2001 Pancrase held 13 events beginning with Pancrase: Proof 1.

== Title fights ==
Title fights in 2001
Weight class				Method	Round	Time	Event	Notes
Light Heavyweight	Sanae Kikuta	def.	Ikuhisa Minowa	TKO (Cut)	2	4:30	Pancrase: 2001 Anniversary Show	(Note: For the Pancrase Light Heavyweight Championship.)
Middleweight	Nate Marquardt (c)	def.	Yuji Hoshino	Submission (Triangle Choke)	3	2:13	Pancrase: Proof 6	(Note: For the Pancrase Middleweight Championship.)
Middleweight	Kiuma Kunioku	def.	Nate Marquardt (c)	Decision (Majority)	3	5:00	Pancrase: Proof 7	(Note: For the Pancrase Middleweight Championship.)
Heavyweight	Kazuo Takahashi	def.	Katsuhisa Fujii	TKO (Punches)	1	1:12	Pancrase: Proof 7	(Note: For the Pancrase Heavyweight Championship.)

== Events list ==
#	Event title	Date	Arena	Location
106	Pancrase: Proof 7	December 1, 2001	Yokohama Cultural Gymnasium	Yokohama, Kanagawa, Japan
105	Pancrase: Proof 6	October 30, 2001	Korakuen Hall	Tokyo, Japan
104	Pancrase: Australia	October 16, 2001		Australia
103	Pancrase: 2001 Anniversary Show	September 30, 2001	Yokohama Cultural Gymnasium	Yokohama, Kanagawa, Japan
102	Pancrase: Proof 5	August 25, 2001	Umeda Stella Hall	Osaka, Osaka, Japan
101	Pancrase: 2001 Neo-Blood Tournament Second Round	July 29, 2001	Korakuen Hall	Tokyo, Japan
100	Pancrase: 2001 Neo-Blood Tournament Opening Round	July 29, 2001	Korakuen Hall	Tokyo, Japan
99	Pancrase: Proof 4	June 26, 2001	Korakuen Hall	Tokyo, Japan
98	Pancrase: Proof 3	May 13, 2001	Korakuen Hall	Tokyo, Japan
97	Pancrase: 2001 Neo-Blood Tournament Eliminations	May 5, 2001	Ota City Gymnasium	Tokyo, Japan
96	Pancrase: Proof 2	March 31, 2001	Namihaya Dome	Kadoma, Osaka, Japan
95	Pancrase Australia: Hybrid Evolution	February 17, 2001	Clancy Centre	Sydney, Australia
94	Pancrase: Proof 1	February 4, 2001	Korakuen Hall	Tokyo, Japan

== Pancrase: Proof 1 ==
Pancrase: Proof 1
- Date: February 4, 2001
- Venue: Aomori Prefectural Gymnasium
- City: Aomori, Japan

Pancrase: Proof 1 was an event held on February 4, 2001 at the Aomori Prefectural Gymnasium in Aomori, Japan.

=== Results ===
Main Card
Weight class				Method	Round	Time	Notes
	Sanae Kikuta	vs.	Alex Stiebling	NC	1	3:11
	Osami Shibuya	def.	Ian Freeman	Submission (Rib Injury)	1	3:51
	Yuki Kondo	def.	Eiji Ishikawa	TKO (Doctor Stoppage)	3	4:16
	Yuki Sasaki	def.	Daisuke Watanabe	Submission (Armbar)	1	4:12
	Kazuo Takahashi	def.	Mitsuyoshi Sato	Decision (Unanimous)	3	5:00
	Sen Nakadai	def.	Kazuhito Kikuchi	Decision (Split)	2	5:00

== Pancrase Australia: Hybrid Evolution ==
Pancrase Australia: Hybrid Evolution
- Date: February 17, 2001
- Venue: Korakuen Hall
- City: Tokyo, Japan

Pancrase Australia: Hybrid Evolution was an event held on February 17, 2001 at Korakuen Hall in Tokyo, Japan.

=== Results ===
Main Card
Weight class				Method	Round	Time	Notes
	David Frendin	def.	Matt Trihey	Submission (Neck Crank)	1	0:00
	Mick Green	def.	Chad Eather	KO	1	0:00
	Mick Green	def.	Nick Tolewski	TKO	1	0:00
	Chad Eather	def.	Ryan Harvey	Submission (Triangle Choke)	1	0:00

== Pancrase: Proof 2 ==
Pancrase: Proof 2
- Date: March 31, 2001
- Venue: Clancy Centre
- City: Sydney, Australia

Pancrase: Proof 2 was an event held on March 31, 2001 at Clancy Centre in Sydney, Australia.

=== Results ===
Main Card
Weight class				Method	Round	Time	Notes
	Paulo Filho	def.	Ikuhisa Minowa	Decision (Unanimous)	3	5:00
	Yuki Kondo	def.	Brian Gassaway	Submission (Toe Hold)	1	1:45
	Kiuma Kunioku	def.	Daiju Takase	Decision (Majority)	3	5:00
	Tim Lajcik	def.	Kengo Watanabe	KO (Punches)	1	3:23
	Mitsuyoshi Sato	def.	Daisuke Ishii	Decision (Majority)	3	5:00
	Nate Marquardt	def.	Hikaru Sato	Submission (Rear-Naked Choke)	1	1:53
	Kosei Kubota	vs.	Satoru Kitaoka	Draw	2	5:00

== Pancrase: 2001 Neo-Blood Tournament Eliminations ==
Pancrase: 2001 Neo-Blood Tournament Eliminations
- Date: May 5, 2001
- Venue: Namihaya Dome
- City: Kadoma, Osaka, Japan

Pancrase: 2001 Neo-Blood Tournament Eliminations was an event held on May 5, 2001 at the Namihaya Dome in Kadoma, Osaka, Japan.

=== Results ===
Main Card
Weight class				Method	Round	Time	Notes
	Hikaru Sato	def.	Ryo Chonan	Decision (Unanimous)	3	5:00
	Kazuo Misaki	def.	Kenichi Serizawa	Decision (Unanimous)	3	5:00
	Sen Nakadai	def.	Hajime Ubukata	KO (Punch)	1	0:49
	Shinya Sato	def.	Hitoyo Kimura	Decision (Unanimous)	3	5:00
	Hideaki Iwasaki	def.	Tashiro Nishiuchi	Decision (Unanimous)	3	5:00
	Hiroki Nagaoka	def.	Takaichi Hirayama	Decision (Unanimous)	3	5:00
	Yohei Ota	def.	Junya Miyakawa	KO (Punch)	1	1:41
	Seiki Ryo	def.	Yukihiro Kanazawa	KO (Punch)	2	4:05

== Pancrase: Proof 3 ==
Pancrase: Proof 3
- Date: May 13, 2001
- Venue: Korakuen Hall
- City: Tokyo, Japan

Pancrase: Proof 3 was an event held on May 13, 2001 at the Korakuen Hall in Tokyo, Japan.

=== Results ===
Main Card
Weight class				Method	Round	Time	Notes
	Manabu Yamada	vs.	Noboru Asahi	—	—	5:00	(Note: Exhibition bout.)
	Ikuhisa Minowa	def.	Yuki Sasaki	Submission (Toe Hold)	3	0:25
	Nate Marquardt	def.	Masaya Kojima	Submission (Armbar)	1	1:45
	Osami Shibuya	def.	Denis Kang	Submission (Rear-Naked Choke)	3	3:45
	Minoru Suzuki	def.	Junichi Yanai	Submission (Achilles Hold)	1	2:46	(Note: Grappling bout.)
	Daisuke Watanabe	def.	Eiji Ishikawa	Decision (Unanimous)	3	5:00
	Takafumi Ito	def.	Kyosuke Sasaki	Decision (Unanimous)	1	5:00	(Note: Grappling bout.)

== Pancrase: Proof 4 ==
Pancrase: Proof 4
- Date: June 26, 2001
- Venue: Korakuen Hall
- City: Tokyo, Japan

Pancrase: Proof 4 was an event held on June 26, 2001 at Korakuen Hall in Tokyo, Japan.

=== Results ===
Main Card
Weight class				Method	Round	Time	Notes
	Sanae Kikuta	def.	Matt Trihey	Submission (Armbar)	1	1:11
	Kiuma Kunioku	def.	Mathieu Nicourt	Submission (Kimura)	2	3:35
	Kazuo Takahashi	def.	David Frendin	TKO (Punches)	1	0:26
	Akihiro Gono	def.	Daisuke Watanabe	TKO (Doctor Stoppage)	2	0:52
	Daisuke Ishii	def.	Jason DeLucia	Decision (Unanimous)	3	5:00
	Kosei Kubota	def.	Yuji Hisamatsu	Decision (Unanimous)	3	5:00
	Yuji Hoshino	def.	Satoru Kitaoka	Decision (Unanimous)	2	5:00
	Mitsuhisa Sunabe	def.	Naoki Deguchi	Decision (Split)	2	5:00

== Pancrase: 2001 Neo-Blood Tournament Opening Round ==
Pancrase: 2001 Neo-Blood Tournament Opening Round
- Date: July 29, 2001
- Venue: Korakuen Hall
- City: Tokyo, Japan

Pancrase: 2001 Neo-Blood Tournament Opening Round was an event held on July 29, 2001 at Korakuen Hall in Tokyo, Japan.

=== Results ===
Main Card
Weight class				Method	Round	Time	Notes
	Ikuhisa Minowa	def.	Kenji Akiyama	Submission (Guillotine Choke)	3	2:52
	Yuki Sasaki	def.	Jason DeLucia	Submission (Armbar)	2	3:05
	Daiju Takase	def.	LaVerne Clark	Submission (Triangle Choke)	2	0:16
	Seiki Ryo	def.	Yohei Ota	Decision (Unanimous)	2	5:00
	Kazuo Misaki	def.	Hikaru Sato	Submission (Rear Naked Choke)	1	4:08
	Hideaki Iwasaki	def.	Sen Nakadai	Submission (Rear Naked Choke)	1	1:40
	Hiroki Nagaoka	def.	Shinya Sato	Decision (Unanimous)	3	5:00

== Pancrase: 2001 Neo-Blood Tournament Second Round ==
Pancrase: 2001 Neo-Blood Tournament Second Round
- Date: July 29, 2001
- Venue: Korakuen Hall
- City: Tokyo, Japan

Pancrase: 2001 Neo-Blood Tournament Second Round was an event held on July 29, 2001 at Korakuen Hall in Tokyo, Japan.

=== Results ===
Main Card
Weight class				Method	Round	Time	Notes
	Kazuo Misaki	def.	Hiroki Nagaoka	Submission (Guillotine Choke)	2	1:21
	Tim Lajcik	def.	Osami Shibuya	Decision (Unanimous)	3	5:00
	Mitsuyoshi Sato	def.	Omar Bouiche	Submission (Reverse Triangle Choke)	2	1:00
	Kiuma Kunioku	vs.	Sean Sherk	Draw	3	5:00
	Keiichiro Yamamiya	def.	Yoshinori Kawasaki	TKO (Punches)	1	4:04
	Kazuo Misaki	def.	Seiki Ryo	Decision (Split)	3	5:00
	Hiroki Nagaoka	def.	Hideaki Iwasaki	Submission (Keylock)	3	1:31

== Pancrase: Proof 5 ==
Pancrase: Proof 5
- Date: August 25, 2001
- Venue: Korakuen Hall
- City: Tokyo, Japan

Pancrase: Proof 5 was an event held on August 25, 2001 at Korakuen Hall in Tokyo, Japan.

=== Results ===
Main Card
Weight class				Method	Round	Time	Notes
	Kazuo Takahashi	def.	Katsuomi Inagaki	Technical Submission (Arm-Triangle Choke)	1	1:38
	Daisuke Watanabe	def.	Nobuhiro Tsurumaki	TKO (Punches)	2	0:17
	Takafumi Ito	def.	Hiroshi Shibata	Submission (Toe Hold)	2	1:22
	Yoshinobu Ota	vs.	Takumi Yano	Draw	2	5:00
	Satoru Kitaoka	vs.	Junya Miyakawa	Draw	2	5:00

== Pancrase: 2001 Anniversary Show ==
Pancrase: 2001 Anniversary Show
- Date: September 30, 2001
- Venue: Umeda Stella Hall
- City: Osaka, Osaka, Japan

Pancrase: 2001 Anniversary Show was an event held on September 30, 2001 at Umeda Stella Hall in Osaka, Osaka, Japan.

=== Results ===
Main Card
Weight class				Method	Round	Time	Notes
Light Heavyweight	Sanae Kikuta	def.	Ikuhisa Minowa	TKO (Cut)	2	4:30	(Note: For the Pancrase Light Heavyweight Championship.)
	Katsuhisa Fujii	def.	Osami Shibuya	Decision (Unanimous)	3	5:00
	Kazuo Takahashi	def.	Marcelo Tigre	DQ (Eye Gouging)	1	3:20
	Minoru Suzuki	def.	Takaku Fuke	Submission (Kneebar)	1	5:09
	Kiuma Kunioku	def.	Ryuki Ueyama	Decision (Majority)	2	5:00
	Katsuhisa Fujii	def.	Jason DeLucia	TKO (Knee Injury)	1	5:00
	Osami Shibuya	def.	Anthony Netzler	Decision (Majority)	2	5:00
	Marcelo Tigre	def.	Tim Lajcik	TKO (Punches)	1	1:34
	Kazuo Takahashi	def.	Hiroya Takada	Submission (Guillotine Choke)	2	0:22

== Pancrase: Australia ==
Pancrase: Australia
- Date: October 16, 2001
- Venue: Yokohama Cultural Gymnasium
- City: Yokohama, Kanagawa, Japan

Pancrase: Australia was an event held on October 16, 2001 at the Yokohama Cultural Gymnasium in Yokohama, Kanagawa, Japan.

=== Results ===
Main Card
Weight class				Method	Round	Time	Notes
	Tony Bonello	def.	Ken Fuller	TKO (Corner Stoppage)	1	1:15
	Luke Pezutti	def.	Richard Buhrmann	Submission (Guillotine Choke)	0	0:00

== Pancrase: Proof 6 ==
Pancrase: Proof 6
- Date: October 30, 2001
- Venue: Korakuen Hall
- City: Tokyo, Japan

Pancrase: Proof 6 was an event held on October 30, 2001 at Korakuen Hall in Tokyo, Japan.

=== Results ===
Main Card
Weight class				Method	Round	Time	Notes
Middleweight	Nate Marquardt (c)	def.	Yuji Hoshino	Submission (Triangle Choke)	3	2:13	(Note: For the Pancrase Middleweight Championship.)
	Akihiro Gono	def.	Keiichiro Yamamiya	Decision (Unanimous)	3	5:00
	Yuki Sasaki	def.	Daisuke Ishii	Submission (Armbar)	1	3:01
	Daisuke Watanabe	vs.	Mitsuyoshi Sato	Draw	3	5:00
	Kosei Kubota	def.	Eiji Ishikawa	KO (Knee)	2	0:56
	Kazuo Misaki	def.	Takaku Fuke	KO (Punches)	1	0:08
	Hideaki Iwasaki	def.	Hikaru Sato	KO (Punch)	2	4:20
	Koji Oishi	def.	Mick Green	Decision (Majority)	2	5:00

== Pancrase: Proof 7 ==
Pancrase: Proof 7
- Date: December 1, 2001
- Venue: Yokohama Cultural Gymnasium
- City: Yokohama, Kanagawa, Japan

Pancrase: Proof 7 was an event held on December 1, 2001 at the Yokohama Cultural Gymnasium in Yokohama, Kanagawa, Japan.

=== Results ===
Main Card
Weight class				Method	Round	Time	Notes
Heavyweight	Kazuo Takahashi	def.	Katsuhisa Fujii	TKO (Punches)	1	1:12	(Note: For the Pancrase Heavyweight Championship.)
Middleweight	Kiuma Kunioku	def.	Nate Marquardt (c)	Decision (Majority)	3	5:00	(Note: For the Pancrase Middleweight Championship.)
	Yuki Kondo	def.	Akihiro Gono	TKO (Corner Stoppage)	3	0:52
	Yuki Sasaki	def.	Osami Shibuya	Submission (Triangle Armbar)	3	3:42
	Sanae Kikuta	def.	Daisuke Watanabe	Submission (Arm-Triangle Choke)	1	2:14
	Ikuhisa Minowa	def.	Hiroshi Shibata	TKO (Doctor Stoppage)	1	2:28
	Chris Lytle	def.	Kazuo Misaki	Decision (Unanimous)	3	5:00
	Satoru Kitaoka	vs.	Hiroki Nagaoka	Draw	2	5:00

== See also ==
- Pancrase
- List of Pancrase champions
- List of Pancrase events
