= UFC 21 =

UFC mixed martial arts event in 1999

UFC 21: Return of the Champions
- The poster for UFC 21: Return of the Champions
- Promotion: Ultimate Fighting Championship
- Date: July 16, 1999
- Venue: Five Seasons Events Center
- City: Cedar Rapids, Iowa

Event chronology
UFC 20: Battle for the Gold	UFC 21: Return of the Champions	UFC 22: Only One Can Be Champion

UFC 21: Return of the Champions was a mixed martial arts event held by the Ultimate Fighting Championship on July 16, 1999 at the Five Seasons Events Center in Cedar Rapids, Iowa. The event was seen live on pay per view in the United States, and later released on home video.

== History ==
UFC 21 marked significant rule changes due to the Council of the Mixed Martial Arts Commission: preliminary bouts now consisted of two five minute-rounds, main card bouts were three five-minute rounds and championship bouts were five five-minute rounds (similar to the Unified Rules of Mixed Martial Arts used today in the United States). UFC 21 was the first UFC event to adopt the 10-point must system, commonly used in boxing, to judge fights instead of each judge merely stating their choice of fighter. 10 points are awarded for fighters who win the round, 6-9 points for the fighter that loses the round. Points are awarded for Octagon control, effective striking, grappling/near submissions, and aggressiveness.

During the event, it was announced that UFC Middleweight Champion Frank Shamrock would defend his title at UFC 22 against rising star Tito Ortiz.

== Results ==
Main Card
Weight class				Method	Round	Time	Notes
Heavyweight	Maurice Smith	def.	Marco Ruas	TKO (corner stoppage)	1	5:00
Welterweight	Pat Miletich (c)	def.	André Pederneiras	TKO (doctor stoppage)	2	2:20	(Note: For the UFC Welterweight Championship.)
Middleweight	Jeremy Horn	def.	Daiju Takase	TKO (punches)	1	4:41
Middleweight	Paul Jones	def.	Flavio Luiz Moura	Submission (rear-naked choke)	1	4:20
Heavyweight	Tsuyoshi Kosaka	def.	Tim Lajcik	TKO (corner stoppage)	2	5:00
Middleweight	Eugene Jackson	def.	Royce Alger	KO (punch)	2	1:19
Alternate Bouts
Heavyweight	Andre Roberts	def.	Ron Waterman	KO (punch)	1	2:51
Heavyweight	Travis Fulton	def.	David Dodd	Decision (unanimous)	2	5:00

== Encyclopedia awards ==
The following fighters were honored in the October 2011 book titled UFC Encyclopedia.

- Fight of the Night: Andre Roberts vs. Ron Waterman
- Knockout of the Night: Eugene Jackson
- Submission of the Night: Paul Jones

== See also ==
- Ultimate Fighting Championship
- List of UFC champions
- List of UFC events
- 1999 in UFC
