= UFC 22 =

UFC mixed martial arts event in 1999

UFC 22: Only One Can be Champion
- The poster for UFC 22: Only One Can be Champion
- Promotion: Ultimate Fighting Championship
- Date: September 24, 1999
- Venue: Lake Charles Civic Center
- City: Lake Charles, Louisiana

Event chronology
UFC 21: Return of the Champions	UFC 22: Only One Can be Champion	UFC 23: Ultimate Japan 2

UFC 22: Only One Can be Champion was a mixed martial arts event held by the Ultimate Fighting Championship on September 24, 1999 at the Lake Charles Civic Center in Lake Charles, Louisiana.

== History ==
The event was headlined by a Light Heavyweight Championship bout between Frank Shamrock and Tito Ortiz. The Ortiz-Shamrock fight was notable for being widely considered one of the best MMA fights ever at the time it took place, due to the complete range of skills shown by both fighters. The bout featured back-and-forth action which saw multiple takedowns from Ortiz and crisp kickboxing displayed by Shamrock, who eventually forced Ortiz into submission with brutal punches, elbows, and hammerfists to the temple late in the 4th round. Shamrock would begin his short lived semi-retirement after this bout, citing a lack of competition.

UFC 22 marked the first UFC appearance of future UFC Welterweight Champion Matt Hughes, who would go on to dominate the UFC's Welterweight division, as well as future UFC Lightweight Championship Jens Pulver, who fought in a preliminary bout that was not televised.

Brad Kohler scored one of the more infamous knockouts in MMA history. 30 seconds into Round 1, Kohler feigned a takedown attempt, only to land an explosive right cross. Steve Judson was knocked out instantly, and suffered a deep gash to his chin at the point of impact. Remaining unconscious and showing signs of having difficulty breathing, referees immediately signaled to the medical staff who administered oxygen treatment to Judson, who was taken out via stretcher to the local hospital.

The event was the second to feature rounds following the significant rule changes first introduced in UFC 21.

== Results ==
Main Card
Weight class				Method	Round	Time	Notes
Middleweight	Frank Shamrock (c)	def.	Tito Ortiz	TKO (submission to punches)	4	4:42	(Note: For the UFC Light Heavyweight Championship.)
Lightweight	Jens Pulver	vs.	Alfonso Alcarez	Draw	2	5:00	(Note: Initially ruled a unanimous decision for Pulver, the decision was later overturned to a draw. This bout was not televised.)
Heavyweight	Brad Kohler	def.	Steve Judson	KO (punch)	1	0:30
Heavyweight	Tim Lajcik	vs.	Ron Waterman	Draw	3	5:00	(Note: The bout was ruled a draw after three five-minute rounds.)
Lightweight	John Lewis	def.	Lowell Anderson	TKO (corner stoppage)	3	0:13
Lightweight	Matt Hughes	def.	Valeri Ignatov	Decision (unanimous)	3	5:00	(Note: Welterweight division did not exist yet.)
Heavyweight	Jeremy Horn	def.	Jason Godsey	Submission (armlock)	1	2:08
Middleweight	Chuck Liddell	def.	Paul Jones	TKO (cut)	1	3:53

== Encyclopedia awards ==
The following fighters were honored in the October 2011 book titled UFC Encyclopedia.

- Fight of the Night: Frank Shamrock vs. Tito Ortiz
- Knockout of the Night: Brad Kohler
- Submission of the Night: Jeremy Horn

== See also ==
- Ultimate Fighting Championship
- List of UFC champions
- List of UFC events
- 1999 in UFC
