= U-Style Axis =

2005 U-Style event

- Promotion: U-File Camp
- Brand: U-Style
- Date: November 23, 2005
- City: Tokyo, Japan
- Venue: Ariake Coliseum
- Attendance: 3,962

U-Style Axis was a professional wrestling event promoted by Kiyoshi Tamura's U-File Camp promotion for its U-Style brand and co-produced with Dream Stage Entertainment. It took place on November 23, 2005, in Tokyo, Japan, at the Ariake Coliseum. The event aired on December 16 on Fighting TV Samurai.

The card comprised eight matches, including one dark match. In the main event, Tamura defeated New Japan Pro-Wrestling representative Josh Barnett by submission.

== Results ==
U-Style Axis match results
No.	Results	Stipulations	Times
1^{D}	Takumi Shimazaki defeated Yugo Itagaki by submission	Singles match	9:02
2	Shamoji Fujii defeated Kyosuke Sasaki by point out	Singles match	7:48
3	Wataru Sakata defeated Hiroyuki Ito by submission	Singles match	10:06
4	Yasuhito Namekawa and Luiz Azeredo defeated Kazuki Okubo and Hidehisa Matsuda by submission	Tag team match	12:08
5	James Thompson defeated Ricardo Morais by technical knockout	Singles match	10:01
6	Frank Shamrock defeated Daisuke Nakamura by submission	Singles match	12:56
7	Toshiaki Kawada defeated Misha Ilyukhin by submission	Singles match	4:44
8	Kiyoshi Tamura defeated Josh Barnett by submission	Singles match	16:10
D / – this was a dark match
