= Tim Lajcik =

American stuntman, actor and MMA fighter (born 1965)

- Born: Timothy Matthew Lajcik; June 21, 1965 (age 61); Redwood City, California, United States
- Other names: The Bohemian
- Height: 6 ft 1 in (1.85 m)
- Weight: 225 lb (102 kg; 16.1 st)
- Division: Heavyweight
- Team: Gladiators Training Academy

Mixed martial arts record
- Total: 14
- Wins: 7
- By knockout: 5
- By submission: 1
- By decision: 1
- Losses: 6
- By knockout: 4
- By submission: 1
- By decision: 1
- Draws: 1

Other information
- Mixed martial arts record from Sherdog

Timothy Matthew Lajcik (Czech: Lajčík; born June 21, 1965) is a retired American mixed martial artist, stuntman, actor and writer. Lajcik competed in the heavyweight division of the Ultimate Fighting Championship and the Pancrase. He lost his last fight at WFA 2 - Level 2 against Kimo Leopoldo on July 5, 2002. Lajcik holds a B.A. in Sociology with an emphasis on social work.

== Championships and Accomplishments ==
- International Fighting Championship
  - IFC Warrior Challenge 2 Tournament Winner
  - IFC Warrior Challenge 7 Tournament Semifinalst

== Mixed martial arts record ==
Professional record breakdown
| 14 matches | 7 wins | 6 losses |
| By knockout | 5 | 4 |
| By submission | 1 | 1 |
| By decision | 1 | 1 |
| Draws | 1 | |

| Res. | Record | Opponent | Method | Event | Date | Round | Time | Location | Notes |
|---|---|---|---|---|---|---|---|---|---|
| Loss | 7–6–1 | Kimo Leopoldo | TKO (broken toe) | WFA 2: Level 2 | July 5, 2002 | 1 | 1:55 | Nevada, United States | |
| Loss | 7–5–1 | Marcelo Tigre | TKO (punches) | Pancrase - 2001 Anniversary Show | September 30, 2001 | 1 | 1:34 | Kanagawa, Japan | |
| Win | 7–4–1 | Osami Shibuya | Decision (unanimous) | Pancrase - 2001 Neo-Blood Tournament Second Round | July 29, 2001 | 3 | 5:00 | Tokyo, Japan | |
| Win | 6–4–1 | Kengo Watanabe | KO (punches) | Pancrase - Proof 2 | March 31, 2001 | 1 | 3:23 | Osaka, Japan | |
| Loss | 5–4–1 | Jeff Monson | Decision | UFC 27 | September 22, 2000 | 2 | 5:00 | Louisiana, United States | |
| Loss | 5–3–1 | Gan McGee | TKO (submission to strikes) | IFC WC 7: Warriors Challenge 7 | May 3, 2000 | 1 | 4:38 | California, United States | IFC WC 7 Tournament Semifinal. |
| Win | 5–2–1 | Joe Campanella | TKO | IFC WC 7: Warriors Challenge 7 | May 3, 2000 | 1 | 0:18 | California, United States | IFC WC 7 Tournament Quarterfinal. |
| Loss | 4–2–1 | Borislav Jeliazkov | Submission (rear-naked choke) | RINGS: King of Kings 1999 Block B | December 22, 1999 | 1 | 2:23 | Osaka, Japan | |
| Draw | 4–1–1 | Ron Waterman | Draw | UFC 22 | September 24, 1999 | 3 | 5:00 | Louisiana, United States | |
| Loss | 4–1 | Tsuyoshi Kohsaka | TKO (corner stoppage) | UFC 21 | July 16, 1999 | 2 | 5:00 | Iowa, United States | |
| Win | 4–0 | Mark Tullius | TKO (submission to strikes) | NG 9: Neutral Grounds 9 | January 10, 1999 | 1 | 6:58 | | |
| Win | 3–0 | Eugene Jackson | Submission (rear naked choke) | IFC WC 2: Warriors Challenge 2 | May 23, 1998 | 1 | 9:49 | California, United States | Won the IFC WC 2 Tournament. |
| Win | 2–0 | David Ross | TKO | IFC WC 2: Warriors Challenge 2 | May 23, 1998 | 1 | 5:36 | California, United States | IFC WC 2 Tournament Semifinal. |
| Win | 1–0 | Paul Devich | TKO | IFC WC 2: Warriors Challenge 2 | May 23, 1998 | 1 | 1:20 | California, United States | IFC WC 2 Tournament Quarterfinal. |
