= Bakouri Gogitidze =

Georgian MMA fighter

- Born: Georgia
- Nationality: Georgian
- Division: Heavyweight
- Years active: 1995 - 2000

Mixed martial arts record
- Total: 6
- Wins: 2
- By submission: 1
- Unknown: 1
- Losses: 4
- By submission: 2
- Unknown: 2

Other information
- Mixed martial arts record from Sherdog

Bakouri Gogitidze (Georgian: ბაკური გოგიტიძე) is a Georgian mixed martial artist. He competed in the Heavyweight division.

== Mixed martial arts record ==
Professional record breakdown
6 matches	2 wins	4 losses
By submission	1	2
Unknown	1	2

Res.	Record	Opponent	Method	Event	Date	Round	Time	Location	Notes
Loss	2-4	Mikhail Ilyukhin	Submission (ankle lock)	Rings: Russia vs. Georgia	August 16, 2000	1	7:25	Tula, Russia	
Loss	2-3	Dan Henderson	Submission (knee to the ribs)	Rings: King of Kings 1999 Block A	October 28, 1999	1	2:17	Tokyo, Japan	
Win	2-2	Mikhail Ilyukhin	Submission (rear naked choke)	Rings: Rings Georgia	October 8, 1999	1	5:07	Georgia	
Loss	1-2	Yoshihisa Yamamoto	N/A	Rings: Battle Dimensions Tournament 1996 Final	January 1, 1997	0	0:00		
Win	1-1	Todor Todorov	N/A	Rings: Battle Dimensions Tournament 1996 Opening Round	October 25, 1996	0	0:00		
Loss	0-1	Mitsuya Nagai	N/A	Rings: Battle Dimensions Tournament 1995 Opening Round	October 21, 1995	0	0:00		

== See also ==
- List of male mixed martial artists
