= Borislav Jeliazkov =

Bulgarian MMA fighter

- Born: January 8, 1971 (age 55); Bulgaria
- Nationality: Bulgarian
- Height: 6 ft 2 in (1.88 m)
- Weight: 213 lb (97 kg; 15.2 st)
- Division: Heavyweight
- Team: Rings Bulgaria
- Years active: 1997 - 2001

Mixed martial arts record
- Total: 11
- Wins: 5
- By knockout: 1
- By submission: 4
- Losses: 6
- By knockout: 1
- By submission: 4
- By decision: 1

Other information
- Mixed martial arts record from Sherdog

Borislav Jeliazkov (Bulgarian: Борислав Желязков) is a Bulgarian mixed martial artist. He competed in the Heavyweight division.

== Mixed martial arts record ==
Professional record breakdown
11 matches	5 wins	6 losses
By knockout	1	1
By submission	4	4
By decision	0	1

Res.	Record	Opponent	Method	Event	Date	Round	Time	Location	Notes
Loss	5–6	Mikhail Ilyukhin	Submission (armbar)	Rings: World Title Series 2	June 15, 2001	2	2:06	Kanagawa, Japan	
Win	5–5	Konstantin Uriadov	Submission (rear-naked choke)	Rings Russia: Russia vs. Bulgaria	April 6, 2001	1	3:09	Yekaterinburg, Russia	
Loss	4–5	Ryushi Yanagisawa	Submission (toe hold)	Rings: King of Kings 2000 Block A	October 9, 2000	1	3:45	Tokyo, Japan	
Win	4–4	David Safarov	Submission (choke)	Rings Russia: Russia vs. Bulgaria	May 21, 2000	1	0:00	Tula, Russia	
Win	3–4	Igor Perminov	KO (knee to the body)	Rings Russia: Russia vs. The World	May 20, 2000	1	1:15	Yekaterinburg, Sverdlovsk Oblast, Russia	
Loss	2–4	Bobby Hoffman	KO (punch)	Rings: Millennium Combine 1	April 20, 2000	1	8:00	Tokyo, Japan	
Loss	2–3	Kiyoshi Tamura	Submission (rear-naked choke)	Rings: King of Kings 1999 Block B	December 22, 1999	2	1:17	Osaka, Japan	
Win	2–2	Tim Lajcik	Submission (rear-naked choke)	Rings: King of Kings 1999 Block B	December 22, 1999	1	2:23	Osaka, Japan	
Loss	1–2	Wataru Sakata	Submission (armbar)	Rings: Rise 4th	June 24, 1999	1	6:49	Japan	
Win	1–1	Wataru Sakata	Submission (scarf hold)	Rings: Rise 1st	March 20, 1999	1	8:28	Japan	
Loss	0–1	Tsuyoshi Kosaka	Decision (lost points)	Rings: Mega Battle Tournament 1997 Semifinal 1	October 25, 1997	1	0:00	Japan	

== See also ==
- List of male mixed martial artists
