= Kiyoshi Tamura =

Japanese professional wrestler and mixed martial arts fighter

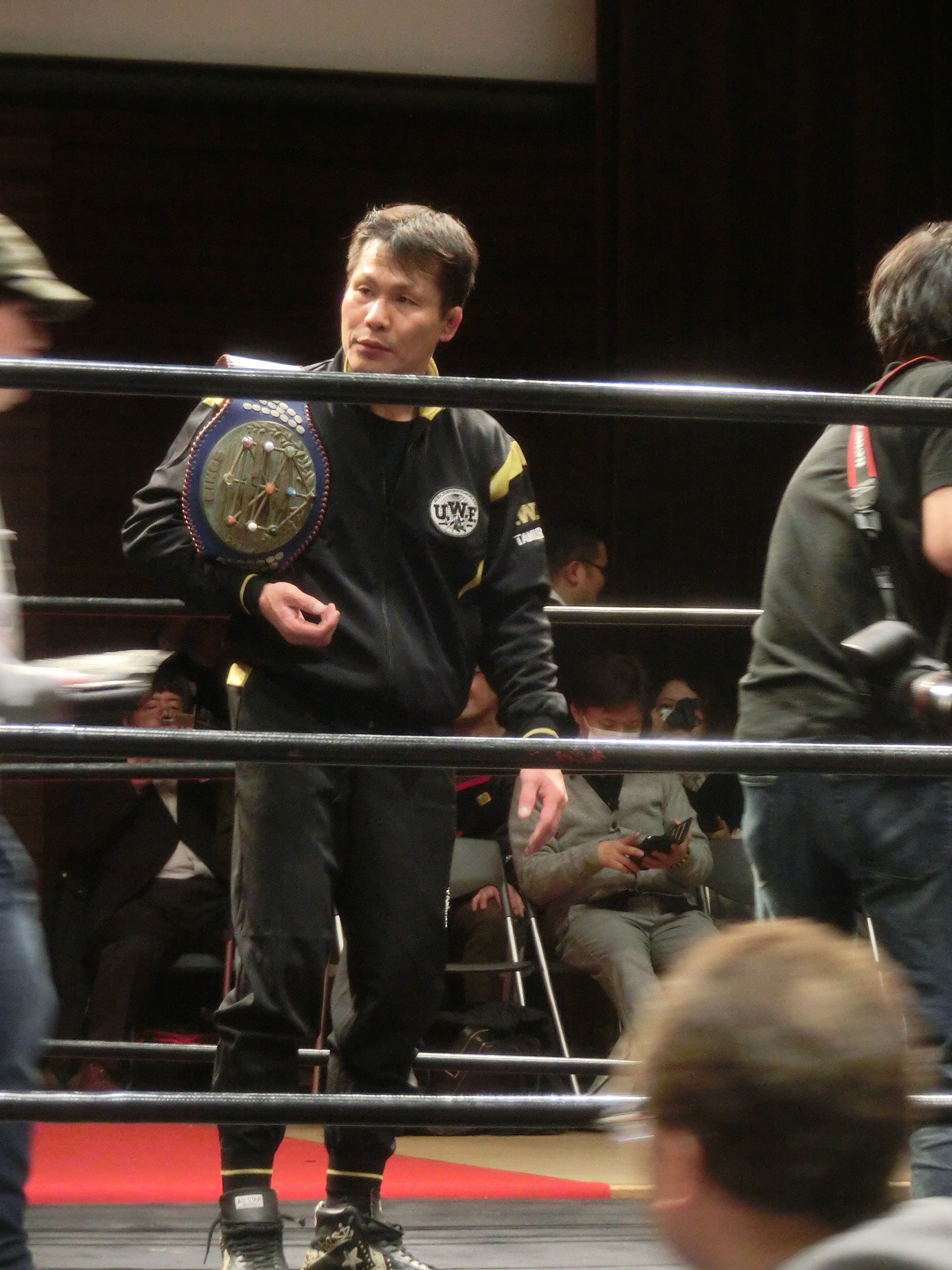
- Tamura at the Masa Saito Memorial event in 2019.
- Born: December 17, 1969 (age 56); Okayama, Okayama, Japan
- Nationality: Japanese
- Height: 1.80 m (5 ft 11 in)
- Weight: 88.5 kg (195 lb)
- Division: Heavyweight; Light Heavyweight; Middleweight
- Stance: Southpaw
- Team: RINGS Japan; U-File Camp
- Teachers: Nobuhiko Takada; Akira Maeda; Billy Robinson; Lou Thesz
- Years active: 1995–2003, 2005–2008

Mixed martial arts record
- Total: 48
- Wins: 32
- By knockout: 6
- By submission: 16
- By decision: 8
- Unknown: 2
- Losses: 13
- By knockout: 4
- By submission: 3
- By decision: 4
- Unknown: 2
- Draws: 3

Other information
- Mixed martial arts record from Sherdog

Kiyoshi Tamura (田村潔司, Tamura Kiyoshi; born December 17, 1969 in Okayama, Okayama) is a Japanese retired professional wrestler and mixed martial artist. Once a student of legendary professional wrestlers Billy Robinson, Lou Thesz and Akira Maeda, Tamura was known for his skills in catch wrestling and is considered to be one of the greatest shoot wrestlers of all time. Competing exclusively in shoot style wrestling, Tamura began his career with UWF Newborn and later joined its successor group UWF International before transitioning to mixed martial arts.

A professional MMA fighter from 1995 until 2008, he competed for the PRIDE Fighting Championships, RINGS, DEEP, DREAM, and fought at K-1's 2007 and 2008 Dynamite!! events. He is a two-time RINGS Openweight Champion and holds notable wins over Renzo Gracie, former UFC Welterweight Champion Pat Miletich, former UFC Middleweight Champion Dave Menne, former Pancrase Super Heavyweight Champion Tsuyoshi Kosaka, former Pancrase Openweight Champion Masakatsu Funaki, Olympic judo gold medallist Makoto Takimoto, three-time sambo champion Volk Han, and Kazushi Sakuraba. Tamura currently serves as an executive director for LIDET Entertainment's professional wrestling promotion GLEAT.

== Professional wrestling career ==
=== UWF Newborn (1989–1990) ===
A former sumo wrestler for the Okayama University of Science High School, Tamura debuted in 1989 in the UWF Newborn in a losing effort against Minoru Suzuki. He soon revealed himself as a promising rookie, but he was forced to put his career in a long hiatus after a match with Akira Maeda on October 25, in which Maeda hit him with a full force knee strike and fractured his orbital bone. Tamura took an entire year to return, and he only had time to work in one event before UWF closed.

=== UWF International (1991–1996) ===
After UWF's demise, Tamura followed to its main successor group, UWF International, where he was put under the tutelage of Nobuhiko Takada. Debuting with a victory against Masahito Kakihara, Tamura was spunky and could even demand respect from older veterans, as demonstrated during a bout against Yoji Anjo where Tamura broke a hold, delivered several kicks to Anjo's head and kicked him out of the ring.

In 1992, after making his shootfighting debut before boxer Matthew Saad Muhammad, submitting him with a rear naked choke, Tamura was sent to United States for a few months to learn catch wrestling under Lou Thesz, who helped refine Tamura's submission skills and ground game. He returned to Japan with a new, polished grappling style, defeating Kazuo Yamazaki in a match without shin guards on October 23. Only some months after, on February 14, 1993, Tamura had a high level match with Nobuhiko Takada, after which many pundits (such as Pro Wrestling Illustrated) compared him to Takada himself and considered him as a candidate for the future ace of the company. By this time, however, Tamura had witnessed the birth of mixed martial arts promotion Pancrase and had become interested by real fighting, like the bout he had fought against Saad.

The next year, Tamura took part in the Best Of The World 1994 Tournament, advancing through the rounds by beating Bad News Allen and Naoki Sano, but being eliminated himself by eventual winner Super Vader at the semi-finals. He also went to lose the match for the second place to main eventer Gary Albright, and never challenged Vader for the title.

Unsatisfied with the symbolic return of UWF to gimmicky puroresu with the victory of Vader, and further inspired by the recent success of Pancrase, Tamura proposed to take a direction towards realistic wrestling again. He would compete in a notable shoot fight against Masahito Kakihara on February 18, 1995, winning by rear naked choke in 2:06. Later, he was granted a victorious rematch against Gary Albright, but the match became infamous for Albright's unwillingness to cooperate, which ruined Tamura's win to the point of having him in tears. The same night, Nobuhiko Takada announced his decision to retire from pro wrestling to pursue a politic career, which was met with harsh words by Tamura. After a new rematch with Albright on August, Tamura addressed the returning Takada and challenged him to a mixed martial arts fight, to no avail.

The same year, UWF International was forced by financial issues into an interpromotional feud against New Japan Pro-Wrestling, but Tamura refused to participate. As a consequence, he was subjected to cold treatment backstage and found himself training alone often. In December 1995, Kiyoshi offered himself instead to represent UWF-i at the event K-1 Hercules, in a mixed martial arts fight against Ultimate Fighting Championship veteran Patrick Smith. It was his first match of any kind in months, and he claimed he would retire if he lost his match to in said event. However, he won the fight.

Tamura returned to UWF-i to feud with Kazushi Sakuraba, but the rivalry was relegated to mid to undercard. He concluded in his intention to leave the company, and asked to be released. He had his final match on May 27, where he defeated Sakuraba and, after the bout, took off his own shin guards and threw them to the audience before leaving the arena.

=== Fighting Network RINGS (1996–2001) ===
After negotiations with Pancrase, Tamura jumped to Fighting Network RINGS, founded by old mentor Maeda, citing a better contract. He was briefly pushed as the top star, being given the first RINGS heavyweight titles. By 1995, RINGS was making the transition from shoot style wrestling to mixed martial arts and Tamura began competing actively in both. In 2001, Tamura fought for the final time in RINGS.

=== Post-RINGS (2003–present) ===
In 2003 he opened his own promotion, U-STYLE. On November 23, 2005, he had his last match for this promotion, defeating Josh Barnett. He briefly came out of retirement for Antonio Inoki's Inoki Genome Federation, the last time being on November 8, 2007, beating Montanha Silva in the latter's IGF debut. In 2020, Tamura joined LIDET Entertainment's GLEAT promotion as an executive director.

== Mixed martial arts career ==
=== Overview ===
Tamura's 32 career wins include victories over mixed martial arts greats such as Jeremy Horn, Renzo Gracie, Ikuhisa Minowa, Nobuhiko Takada, Pat Miletich and held Frank Shamrock to a draw at a time when Shamrock was reigning UFC champion. However, in spite of his many accomplishments inside the arena of MMA, his record is somewhat marred by a preponderance of match-ups against top heavyweight and light-heavyweight competitors, including Antônio Rodrigo Nogueira, the 350-pound Bob Sapp and the former Olympic gold medalist Hidehiko Yoshida amongst others.

Kiyoshi had his first taste of MMA back in professional wrestling promotion Union of Wrestling Forces International, where he choked out boxer Matthew Saad Muhammad in a mixed rules bout in 1992 and also in 1995 where he beat fellow UWF-i wrestler Masahito Kakihara via rear naked choke in a shoot contest. He later offered to fight in the K-1 Hercules MMA event, where he made short work of Patrick Smith via heel hook.

=== Fighting Network RINGS ===
Tamura began his MMA career at Fighting Network RINGS in a series of shoot fights against his fellow RINGS Japan teammates in late 1996. After a scarf hold armlock submission win against Mitsuya Nagai, he faced Yoshihisa Yamamoto in the semi-finals of the 1996 Battle Dimensions Tournament. After taking a series of strikes from Yamamoto which left Tamura with a bloodied face, he then managed to control the fight for another submission win. A couple of months later, he submitted a striker in the form of Andre Mannaart, and was then pitted against sambo and kickboxing expert Valentijn Overeem. Outweighed by 25 lbs, Tamura managed to take Overeem down early in the fight and fought for a kimura, however Overeem submitted Tamura multiple times, the Japanese ultimately losing the match by kneebar. It forced the RING executives to make him lose the Openweight Championship to Tariel Bitsadze.

In 1999, Tamura faced former UWFi teammate Hiromitsu Kanehara and won the back and forth grappling affair via armbar. Tamura then faced former Pancrase star Frank Shamrock, who had defeated Tamura's teammate Tsuyoshi Kohsaka years before and become his training partner in The Alliance. Tamura controlled the match, taking down Shamrock and keeping dominant position over him, but he was forced to spend a rope escape when Shamrock caught him in an armbar in his first takedown. The Japanese retaliated by threatening him with a Kimura lock, another armbar and a pair of scarf hold armlocks which almost finished the fight, but the American miraculously escaped from all of them. After twelve minutes, however, Shamrock lost the point for an illegal closed-fisted punch, balancing their respective point scores and forcing him to switch to attack. Shamrock attempted a Kimura lock and an ankle hold, but Tamura defended them successfully and the time of the match ran out. It was declared a draw by points and is considered to be one of the biggest surprises in the sport.

The same year, Tamura took part in the King of Kings tournament, facing Dave Menne as his first opponent. He landed several hooks, but lost the advantage upon attempting a flying armbar. After the restart, they exchanged strikes until Menne slipped down on a high kick, which Tamura capitalized in order to mount Menne on the ground and throw punches. Finally, Tamura knocked down Dave again and took his back, ending the match with a unanimous decision.

Following an uneventful second round win over Borislav Jeliazkov, Tamura found himself pitted against Renzo Gracie from the Gracie family. The Brazilian fighter got the earliest of the fight with a guillotine choke from the guard, but Tamura started to dominate thanks to his superior striking and takedown defense. Believing himself to be the superior on the ground, Renzo lied down and challenged Tamura to grapple with him, which the Japanese shooter did, managing to pass his guard and taking the back of the Brazilian jiu-jitsu specialist. After returning to the standing position by the referee's order, Tamura captured the back again by reversing a takedown and locked crucifix, which he used to pursue a choke until the end of the time. Tamura was awarded the unanimous decision, being the second Japanese in defeating a Gracie after Kazushi Sakuraba did it with Royler earlier in the year.

At the semifinals, Kiyoshi fought Brazilian luta livre exponent Renato Sobral, 40 pounds heavier than the Japanese. The stronger Sobral attacked with knee strikes and took his back in some occasions while Tamura landed leg kicks and looked for an opening. Going to the ground, both attempted several kinds of submissions, including an armbar by Sobral and a figure four toehold by Tamura, but they were unsuccessful. Ended the battle, two judges ruled a draw and a third one (Jon Bluming) ruled in Sobral's favor, thus eliminating Tamura from the tournament.

On April 20, 2000, Tamura put in the line his RINGS Openweight Championship (won against Tariel Bitsadze in a professional wrestling match) in a mixed martial arts fight against RINGS Holland fighter Gilbert Yvel. The best wrestler of the two, Tamura was able to take dominant position on the ground multiple times, but the rule against punches to the face on the mat, the referee's quick standups, and Yvel's own defensive grappling acumen impeded him from gaining the advantage. Yvel, the best striker, landed several knees and punches through the match, and towards the end of the second round landed a series of strikes, making the referee stop the match in his favor.

Tamura bounced back from his title loss representing RINGS in the Colosseum 2000 event, where he was pitted against Jeremy Horn. The bigger American managed to difficult Tamura's takedowns, but the Japanese gained dominance with striking despite not wearing gloves (which forced him to use only open-handed strikes). At the second round, action slowed down in Tamura's butterfly guard, and although the American passed it at the last minutes and sought to establish a submission, time went out for a decision win for Tamura. In August 2000, Tamura fought as well Pat Miletich, Horn's teammate. Unlike the previous match, Tamura controlled the striking, landing several leg kicks. The contenders exchanged takedowns at both rounds, but Tamura achieved positional control more often, thus winning a majority decision.

In October 2000, Tamura partaked in the King of Kings tournament as well, eliminating Zaza Tkeshelashvili before going against another Brazilian, Antônio Rodrigo Nogueira. The jiu-jitsu expert opened the match taking Tamura down and trying to pass his guard, eventually performing an armbar which Kiyoshi countered rolling outwards and taking his back. The Japanese fighter then avoided a kneebar and attacked Nogueira's guard until the standup. The action repeated itself, with Nogueira taking him down and Tamura capitalizing on a kneebar attempt to get dominant position, but this time Nogueira reversed and attempted a Kimura lock for the end of the round. At the second one, the Brazilian pressed Tamura with a takedown and slowly climbed up his way through positions to an armbar from the back. Kiyoshi defended it for minutes, but at the end, Nogueira repositioned and got the hold, making Tamura tap out.

After his King of Kings tenure, Tamura was granted a rematch against Renato Sobral, but as in the first time, the bigger Brazilian controlled the bout with wrestling and positional dominance. Kiyoshi had his last fight for RINGS facing Gustavo Machado, losing an uneventful decision again.

=== PRIDE Fighting Championships ===
Tamura made his debut in PRIDE Fighting Championships in a title fight against Wanderlei Silva for the PRIDE Middleweight Championship. Silva blocked Tamura's takedowns and attacked him with hard punches and a knee to the face. In one instance, Tamura landed a punch which stunned Wanderlei, but it was short-lived, and the Brazilian fighter recovered and continued with the brutal ground and pound, bloodying Kiyoshi's face. The second round saw the same action, with Silva counterstriking with a right hook which knocked out Tamura for the win.

After the bout, there were suggestions for Tamura to portray the Tiger Mask professional wrestling gimmick in the Pride ring, having his first match against Ryan Gracie. However, those plans were abandoned.

Tamuras next match would be a similarly tough matchup, facing the large Bob Sapp, who almost doubled Tamura's weight. The match was short and shocking, and saw Sapp charging at Tamura and knocking him out with looping punches at 0:11.

At PRIDE 31, Tamura got a desired rematch against Antônio Rodrigo Nogueira, who had bested him years before in RINGS. The result would be the same, as Nogueira took him down, gained his back and locked an armbar for the tap out.

In an event for related promotion Deep in September 2002, Tamura defeated another shoot-style fighter, Ikuhisa Minowa, by unanimous decision. They had a rematch in PRIDE two years later, which was much shorter, with Tamura overwhelming Minowa with leg kicks and a knee strike, followed by soccer kicks to the head. Tamura and Minowa shook hands as a sign of respect after the match, though Tamura featured an incident in which he shoved the referee for what was believed to be a late stoppage.

In August 2003, Tamura fought judo medalist Hidehiko Yoshida in the latter's third MMA fight. Showing his experience, Tamura knocked him down with a left cross and worked through his guard before returning to their feet. Afterwards, the shoot wrestler landed continuous kicks to Yoshida's legs and body, also capturing his back once during a failed judo throw. Finally, Yoshida threw Tamura down and forced him to tap to a quick sode guruma jime. The strange sequence of the choke brought accusations of a fixed fight performed to increase Yoshida's popularity, but Dave Meltzer and other pundits considered it dubious, attributing it to Tamura's own inexperience with gi chokes.

For several years, efforts have been made by PRIDE to put Tamura and fellow UWFi alum and mixed martial artist Kazushi Sakuraba together in a fight due to their status as two of the best Japanese fighters of their time as well as a rumored rivalry. An announcement was made at PRIDE 34 by Nobuyuki Sakakibara that promised the fans a future fight between the two. However, PRIDE ceased being an active promotion after that event.

=== Post-PRIDE ===
At K-1 Premium 2007, Tamura faced Hideo Tokoro, an apprentice of former RINGS wrestler Kenichi Yamamoto. Outweighing his opponent by 17 kg (38 lbs) and showing a brilliant submission defense, Tamura kept control over him in the grappling exchanges, taking his back several times and grinding him with punches and ground and pound, until he locked a stretch armlock from a keylock position in round 3 to make him tap out.

A year after, Tamura would fight yet another shoot-style fighter, this time the Pancrase legend Masakatsu Funaki. Despite the hype surrounding the fight, caused by RINGS' and Pancrase' former rivalry, the bout was swift, with Tamura outstriking him and tripping him to the mat for the ground and pound TKO.

Finally it was announced that Kiyoshi Tamura and Kazushi Sakuraba were set to fight at the K-1 Dynamite!! event on December 31, 2008. The fight was characterized by Tamura generally countering take-down and submission attempts by Sakuraba while applying ground and pound from the top position throughout the bout. At the end of the first round, Sakuraba appeared to have an armbar locked in, but Tamura held on and in the second controlled much of the action until being taken down by Sakuraba in the final minute. Ultimately, Tamura was awarded a unanimous decision.

== Personal life ==
On July 7, 2007, Tamura married tarento and pro wrestling host Yumiko Sakurai.

== Championships and accomplishments ==
=== Mixed martial arts ===
- Fighting Network RINGS
  - RINGS Openweight Championship (Two times; first)
  - 1997 RINGS Mega Battle Tournament Winner
  - 1996 RINGS Mega Battle Tournament Runner Up
  - 1999 RINGS King of Kings Tournament Semifinalist

=== Professional wrestling ===
- Pro Wrestling Illustrated
  - PWI ranked him #98 of the top 500 singles wrestlers of the "PWI Years" in 2003
- Wrestling Observer Newsletter awards
  - Best Technical Wrestler (1998)

== Mixed martial arts record ==
Professional record breakdown
48 matches	32 wins	13 losses
By knockout	6	4
By submission	17	3
By decision	8	4
Unknown	1	2
Draws	3	

Res.	Record	Opponent	Method	Event	Date	Round	Time	Location	Notes
Win	32–13–3	Kazushi Sakuraba	Decision (unanimous)	Fields Dynamite!! 2008	December 31, 2008	2	5:00	Saitama, Saitama, Japan	
Win	31–13–3	Masakatsu Funaki	TKO (punches)	DREAM 2: Middleweight Grand Prix 2008 First Round	April 29, 2008	1	0:57	Saitama, Saitama, Japan	
Win	30–13–3	Hideo Tokoro	Submission (straight armbar)	K-1 Premium 2007 Dynamite!!	December 31, 2007	3	3:08	Osaka, Japan	
Loss	29–13–3	Taiei Kin	Decision (unanimous)	HERO'S 9	July 16, 2007	2	5:00	Yokohama, Japan	
Win	29–12–3	Ikuhisa Minowa	KO (soccer kicks)	PRIDE FC: Shockwave 2006	December 31, 2006	1	1:18	Saitama, Saitama, Japan	Middleweight debut.
Loss	28–12–3	Antônio Rodrigo Nogueira	Submission (armbar)	PRIDE 31: Dreamers	February 26, 2006	1	2:24	Saitama, Saitama, Japan	Heavyweight bout.
Win	28–11–3	Makoto Takimoto	Decision (unanimous)	PRIDE Critical Countdown 2005	June 26, 2005	3	5:00	Saitama, Saitama, Japan	88.5 kg bout.
Win	27–11–3	Aliev Makhmud	TKO (retirement)	PRIDE 29	February 20, 2005	1	7:09	Saitama, Saitama, Japan	88.5 kg bout.
Win	26–11–3	Rony Sefo	Submission (armbar)	PRIDE Shockwave 2003	December 31, 2003	1	2:20	Saitama, Saitama, Japan	
Loss	25–11–3	Hidehiko Yoshida	Submission (Ezekiel choke)	PRIDE Total Elimination 2003	August 10, 2003	1	5:06	Saitama, Saitama, Japan	
Win	25–10–3	Nobuhiko Takada	KO (punch)	PRIDE 23	November 24, 2002	2	1:00	Tokyo, Japan	Return to Heavyweight.
Win	24–10–3	Ikuhisa Minowa	Decision (unanimous)	DEEP: 6th Impact	September 7, 2002	3	5:00	Tokyo, Japan	Openweight bout.
Loss	23–10–3	Bob Sapp	KO (punches)	PRIDE 21	June 23, 2002	1	0:11	Saitama, Saitama, Japan	Super Heavyweight bout.
Loss	23–9–3	Wanderlei Silva	KO (punch)	PRIDE 19	February 24, 2002	2	2:28	Saitama, Saitama, Japan	For the PRIDE Middleweight Championship.
Loss	23–8–3	Gustavo Machado	Decision (unanimous)	RINGS: World Title Series 1	April 20, 2001	2	5:00	Tokyo, Japan	
Loss	23–7–3	Renato Sobral	Decision (majority)	RINGS: King of Kings 2000 Final	February 24, 2001	2	5:00	Tokyo, Japan	
Loss	23–6–3	Antônio Rodrigo Nogueira	Submission (armbar)	RINGS: King of Kings 2000 Block A	October 9, 2000	2	2:29	Tokyo, Japan	
Win	23–5–3	Zaza Tkeshelashvili	Decision (unanimous)	RINGS: King of Kings 2000 Block A	October 9, 2000	2	5:00	Tokyo, Japan	
Win	22–5–3	Pat Miletich	Decision (majority)	RINGS: Millennium Combine 3	August 23, 2000	2	5:00	Osaka, Japan	
Win	21–5–3	Jeremy Horn	Decision (unanimous)	C2K: Colosseum 2000	May 26, 2000	2	5:00	Japan	
Loss	20–5–3	Gilbert Yvel	TKO	RINGS: Millennium Combine 1	April 20, 2000	1	13:13	Tokyo, Japan	Lost RINGS Openweight Championship.
Loss	20–4–3	Renato Sobral	Decision (majority)	RINGS: King of Kings 1999 Final	February 26, 2000	2	5:00	Tokyo, Japan	
Win	20–3–3	Renzo Gracie	Decision (unanimous)	RINGS: King of Kings 1999 Final	February 26, 2000	2	5:00	Tokyo, Japan	
Win	19–3–3	Borislav Jeliazkov	Submission (rear-naked choke)	RINGS: King of Kings 1999 Block B	December 22, 1999	2	1:17	Osaka, Japan	
Win	18–3–3	Dave Menne	Decision (unanimous)	RINGS: King of Kings 1999 Block B	December 22, 1999	2	5:00	Osaka, Japan	
Win	17–3–3	Joop Kasteel	Submission (armbar)	RINGS: Rise 5th	August 19, 1999	2	2:17	Japan	
Draw	16–3–3	Yoshihisa Yamamoto	Draw	RINGS: Rise 4th	June 24, 1999	3	5:00	Japan	
Win	16–3–2	Tariel Bitsadze	Submission (rear-naked choke)	RINGS: Rise 3rd	May 22, 1999	1	9:19	Japan	Won the RINGS Openweight Championship.
Draw	15–3–2	Frank Shamrock	Draw	RINGS: Rise 2nd	April 23, 1999	1	20:00	Japan	
Win	15–3–1	Hiromitsu Kanehara	Submission (armbar)	RINGS: Rise 1st	March 20, 1999	3	0:14	Japan	
Win	14–3–1	Valentijn Overeem	Submission (armbar)	RINGS: Final Capture	February 21, 1999	1	6:08	Japan	
Win	13–3–1	Kenichi Yamamoto	TKO	RINGS: World Mega Battle Tournament	December 23, 1998	2	1:26	Japan	
Draw	12–3–1	Tsuyoshi Kohsaka	Draw	RINGS: Fourth Fighting Integration	June 27, 1998	1	30:00	Tokyo, Japan	
Loss	12–3	Tariel Bitsadze	TKO	RINGS: Third Fighting Integration	May 29, 1998	1	3:39	Tokyo, Japan	Lost the RINGS Openweight Championship.
Win	12–2	Mikhail Ilyukhin	Submission	RINGS: Battle Dimensions Tournament 1997 Final	January 21, 1998	N/A	N/A	N/A	Won RINGS 1997 Mega Battle Tournament; became the inaugural RINGS Openweight Champion.
Win	11–2	Akira Maeda	N/A	RINGS: Battle Dimensions Tournament 1997 Final	January 21, 1998	N/A	N/A	N/A	RINGS 1997 Mega Battle Tournament Semifinals.
Win	10–2	Joop Kasteel	KO	RINGS: Battle Dimensions Tournament 1997 Final	January 21, 1998	N/A	N/A	N/A	RINGS 1997 Mega Battle Tournament Quarterfinals.
Win	9–2	Hans Nijman	Submission (kimura)	RINGS: Mega Battle Tournament 1997 Semifinal 1	October 25, 1997	N/A	N/A	N/A	
Win	8–2	Volk Han	Submission (armbar)	RINGS: Extension Fighting 7	September 26, 1997	N/A	N/A	N/A	
Win	7–2	Tsuyoshi Kohsaka	Submission (toe hold)	RINGS: Extension Fighting 2	April 22, 1997	N/A	N/A	N/A	
Win	6–2	Andre Mannaart	Submission (rear-naked choke)	RINGS Holland: The Final Challenge	February 2, 1997	N/A	N/A	N/A	
Loss	5–2	Volk Han	N/A	RINGS: Budokan Hall 1997	January 22, 1997	N/A	N/A	N/A	
Loss	5–1	Volk Han	N/A	RINGS: Battle Dimensions Tournament 1996 Final	January 1, 1997	N/A	N/A	N/A	
Win	5–0	Yoshihisa Yamamoto	Submission (neck crank)	RINGS: Battle Dimensions Tournament 1996 Final	January 1, 1997	N/A	N/A	N/A	
Win	4–0	Mitsuya Nagai	Submission (scarf hold armlock)	RINGS: Battle Dimensions Tournament 1996 Final	January 1, 1997	1	6:13	N/A	
Win	3–0	Mikhail Ilyukhin	Submission	RINGS: Battle Dimensions Tournament 1996 Opening Round	October 25, 1996	N/A	N/A	N/A	
Win	2–0	Maurice Smith	Submission (armbar)	RINGS: Maelstrom 6	August 24, 1996	N/A	N/A	N/A	
Win	1–0	Patrick Smith	Submission (heel hook)	K-1 Hercules	December 9, 1995	N/A	N/A	N/A	

=== Mixed rules ===
Professional record breakdown
2 matches	2 wins	0 losses
By submission	2	0

Res.	Record	Opponent	Method	Event	Date	Round	Time	Location	Notes
Win	2–0	Masahito Kakihara	Submission (rear-naked choke)	UWF-i Sakigake	February 18, 1995	1	2:06	Urayasu, Chiba, Japan	
Win	1–0	Matthew Saad Muhammad	Submission (rear-naked choke)	UWF-i Combat Sport Yokohama	May 8, 1992	1	0:38	Yokohama, Kanagawa, Japan	

== Submission grappling record ==
KO PUNCHES

Result	Opponent	Method	Event	Date	Round	Time	Notes
Draw	(Japan) Kazushi Sakuraba and (Japan) Hideo Tokoro	Draw	Rizin FF 1	2016	1	15:00	Partnered with (Brazil) Wanderlei Silva.
Loss	(Brazil) Ricardo Liborio	Submission (armbar)	ADCC 2001 –88 kg	2001	1	1:02	
