= UFC 27 =

2000 mixed martial arts event in America

UFC 27: Ultimate Bad Boyz
- Promotion: Ultimate Fighting Championship
- Date: September 22, 2000
- Venue: Lakefront Arena
- City: New Orleans, Louisiana

Event chronology
UFC 26: Ultimate Field of Dreams	UFC 27: Ultimate Bad Boyz	UFC 28: High Stakes

UFC 27: Ultimate Bad Boyz was a mixed martial arts event held by the Ultimate Fighting Championships on September 22, 2000 at the Lakefront Arena in New Orleans, Louisiana.

== Background ==
UFC 27 was the 4th UFC event to be held in Louisiana after UFC 16, 18 and 22, as well as the third in New Orleans.

In the event, UFC legend Dan Severn returned to the promotion after more than 3 years on the independent scene to face off against top heavyweight contender Pedro Rizzo. Severn was the fan favorite, but he submitted to leg kicks from Rizzo in the first round.

The event also featured former UFC Heavyweight Champion Maurice Smith took on the first KOTC Heavyweight Champion Bobby Hoffman. Smith won via majority decision. There were two preliminary fights and six main card fights.

Jackson then faced Jeremy Horn on September 22, 2000, at this event. He lost the fight via an armbar submission in the first round.

== Results ==
Main Card
Weight class				Method	Round	Time	Notes
Heavyweight	Pedro Rizzo	def.	Dan Severn	TKO (submission to kicks)	1	1:33
Heavyweight	Maurice Smith	def.	Bobby Hoffman	Decision (majority)	3	5:00
Middleweight	Jeremy Horn	def.	Eugene Jackson	Submission (armbar)	1	4:32
Lightweight	Fabiano Iha	def.	LaVerne Clark	Submission (armbar)	1	1:10
Middleweight	Yuki Kondo	def.	Alexandre Dantas	TKO (punches)	3	2:28
Heavyweight	Ian Freeman	def.	Tedd Williams	Decision (unanimous)	3	5:00
Preliminary Card
Heavyweight	Jeff Monson	def.	Tim Lajcik	Decision (unanimous)	2	5:00
Lightweight	Brad Gumm	vs.	CJ Fernandes	Draw (unanimous)	2	5:00

== Encyclopedia awards ==
The following fighters were honored in the October 2011 book titled UFC Encyclopedia.

- Knockout of the Night: Yuki Kondo
- Submission of the Night: Fabiano Iha

== See also ==
- Ultimate Fighting Championship
- List of UFC champions
- List of UFC events
- 2000 in UFC
