= Ian Freeman (mixed martial artist) =

English mixed martial arts fighter

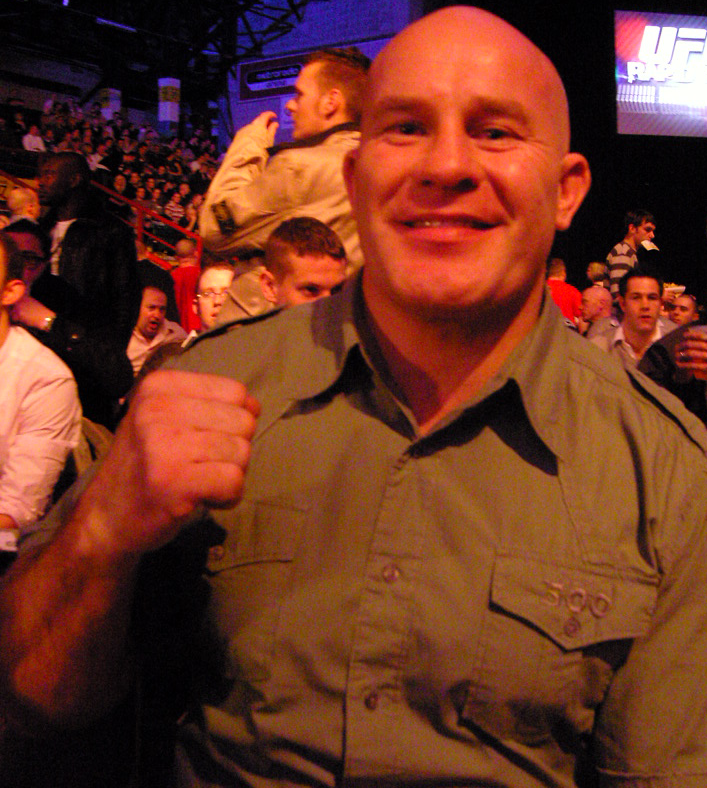
- Born: 11 October 1966 (age 60); Sunderland, England
- Other names: The Machine
- Height: 5 ft 11 in (1.80 m)
- Weight: 205 lb (93 kg; 14.6 st)
- Division: Light Heavyweight; Heavyweight
- Fighting out of: Stanley, County Durham, England
- Years active: 1999–2013

Mixed martial arts record
- Total: 28
- Wins: 20
- By knockout: 10
- By submission: 6
- By decision: 4
- Losses: 7
- By knockout: 6
- By submission: 1
- Draws: 1

Other information
- Mixed martial arts record from Sherdog

Ian William Freeman (born 11 October 1966) is a retired English mixed martial artist who was the Cage Rage World Heavyweight Champion and the final Cage Rage British Light Heavyweight Champion. He was the first British person to fight in the UFC, as well as the first person to beat Frank Mir.

== Martial arts background ==
Freeman came into Martial Arts from Boxing, in which he had trained for around ten years, after being taught by his father, who was an ABA Boxing Champion at 18 years of age. While working as a doorman, Freeman ended up fighting with a man who was intoxicated; a friend mentioned that rather than punch him, he should have broke the mans arm. Curious as to what he could learn, he started training in Goshin Jujutsu for around six to eight months before competing in an amateur Vale Tudo competition. In his early days, he would go on to train in Kickboxing, Judo, Wrestling, Brazilian Jiu-Jitsu, and Muay Thai periodically with various instructors, including Marco Ruas and Renzo Gracie.

== Mixed martial arts career ==
Freeman entered the professional circuit in 1999. He was considered an early ambassador for mixed martial arts and given the nickname, "The Iron Ambassador." In early 2000, the UFC approached Ian to fight at UFC 24, where he lost to Scott Adams via achilles lock submission. He fought two more times in the UFC, winning both times. Later, Freeman's career hit a low point with four losses in a row, but he returned with a submission win in a rematch with Stanislav Nuschik.

His greatest triumph was arguably his win on home soil over Frank Mir at UFC 38. The heavy underdog, Freeman lived up to his nickname as he systematically ground Mir down and broke his spirit, winning a first round stoppage in front of the English crowd. The match was bittersweet for Freeman, having dedicated the match to his father who, unbeknown to him, had died of cancer the day before. Victory gave Freeman the chance to make his mark on the UFC Heavyweight division but his next fight saw him stopped by Andrei Arlovski. Seven months later, a draw against middleweight Vernon White signalled the end of Freeman's second stint in UFC and led to his return to the British MMA scene.

After one successful fight for the Cage Warriors promotion, Ian took a break from MMA, citing chronic fatigue syndrome and an overly intense training schedule. He returned eleven months later to fight Ryan Robinson for the vacant Cage Rage Heavyweight title. Defeating Robinson within one round with his now-customary ground and pound, Freeman vacated the title and announced he was dropping to Light Heavyweight. In early 2005, Ian again appeared to ebb away from MMA, appearing as a referee in ITV's ill-fated Celebrity Wrestling game show, which was quickly relegated to Sunday mornings and subsequently cancelled.

=== Retirement ===
Freeman was scheduled to return to the UFC to fight Forrest Griffin at UFC 55 - Fury but suffered a horse-riding accident and was unable to compete. After not competing for nearly nine months, he announced his retirement from competitive MMA. He later cited the return of chronic fatigue as a factor in his layoff and subsequent retirement.

=== Comeback ===
After a year-long layoff, he returned to training. He approached Cage Rage and was soon offered a match against the Cage Rage World Light Heavyweight champion Melvin Manhoef in 2006 at Cage Rage 17. Originally slated as a "super-bout" at a catchweight of 96 kg (211 lbs), Manhoef asked for the fight to take place at the light heavyweight limit of 93 kg (205 lbs), which placed his World Light Heavyweight title on the line. Freeman lost the fight by KO in just 17 seconds.

Freeman got a shot at British Light Heavyweight champion Mark Epstein at Cage Rage 18 on 30 September 2006. Freeman overpowered Epstein with his ground-and-pound tactic, winning his second Cage Rage title. Freeman then trained at the TSG MMA (Team Sure Grip Mixed Martial Arts) School under Daniel Burzotta to fight Paul Cahoon for the British Cage Rage Light Heavyweight title on 10 May 2008 at Cage Rage 26. He won unanimously after three rounds.

In his first bout since 2008, Freeman was expected to fight UFC Hall of Famer Ken Shamrock at an Ultimate Cage Fighting Championships event on 27 July 2013. The fight with Shamrock was cancelled due to contractual issues on Shamrock's part.

After Shamrock backed out of the fight he was replaced by Ricco Rodriguez. Ian won by TKO, stopping Rodriguez at 2:06 of Round 1.

Shortly after this win, Freeman retired from competition, citing his age and health issues.

== Outside of fighting ==
His autobiography, "Cage Fighter: The True Story of Ian 'The Machine' Freeman", was published in 2004 by Blake Publishing.

In 2004, he was the referee on the game show Britain's Hardest, which ran for 10 episodes on Sky 1.

On 1 November 2006, it was announced that Ian was due to coach a British-based team that would have participated in the International Fight League from 2008, had the promotion not shut down due to financial difficulties.

In 2005, Ian was the referee on ITV's ill-fated Celebrity Wrestling gameshow. Freeman also starred in the 2008 British boxing action-comedy film Sucker Punch.

In 2009, Freeman was sentenced to nine months in prison, suspended for a year, for tax fraud, as he had not declared earnings from his fighting career and had also fraudulently claimed £12,352 in tax credits with his wife. He was additionally ordered to complete 120 hours community service and wear an electronic tag. His wife was sentenced to a six-week community order and also electronically tagged.

Ian was the ring announcer for M-1 Global: Breakthrough, which took place on 28 August 2009 at Memorial Hall, in Kansas City, Kansas.

Ian has recently agreed to be ring announcer for Clan Wars, Ireland's first Pro ISKA governed MMA competition.

In 2010, Ian worked as spokesman for the now defunct Kudegra Fighting Championship, shortly after he parted company with the promotion.

In 2025, his daughter Kennedy was signed to UFC.

== Career accomplishments ==
=== Mixed martial arts ===
- Ultimate Fighting Championship
  - UFC Encyclopedia Awards
    - Fight of the Night (One time) vs. Frank Mir

== Mixed martial arts record ==
Professional record breakdown
28 matches	20 wins	7 losses
By knockout	10	6
By submission	6	1
By decision	4	0
Draws	1	

Res.	Record	Opponent	Method	Event	Date	Round	Time	Location	Notes
Win	20–7–1	Ricco Rodriguez	TKO (punches)	UCFC 5: Legends of MMA	27 July 2013	1	2:11	Doncaster, England	
Win	19–7–1	Paul Cahoon	Decision (unanimous)	Cage Rage 26	10 May 2008	3	5:00	Birmingham, England	Won the Cage Rage British Light Heavyweight Championship.
Win	18–7–1	Mark Epstein	Decision (unanimous)	Cage Rage 18	30 September 2006	3	5:00	London, England	Won the Cage Rage British Light Heavyweight Championship; Later vacated title.
Loss	17–7–1	Melvin Manhoef	KO (punches)	Cage Rage 17	1 July 2006	1	0:17	London, England	Light Heavyweight debut; For the Cage Rage Light Heavyweight Championship.
Win	17–6–1	Will Elworthy	TKO (punches)	House of Pain 1	12 December 2004	1	N/A	Swansea, Wales	
Win	16–6–1	Ryan Robinson	TKO (punches)	Cage Rage 9	27 September 2004	1	2:44	London, England	Won the Cage Rage Heavyweight Championship; Later vacated title.
Win	15–6–1	Keith Dace	TKO (punches)	CWFC 5: Cage Warriors 5	2 November 2003	1	0:47	South Shields, England	
Draw	14–6–1	Vernon White	Draw (split)	UFC 43	6 June 2003	3	5:00	Paradise, Nevada, United States	
Win	14–6	Gerhard Ettl (fighter)	Submission (armbar)	FFAA: Fight Night Championships 4	22 February 2003	2	1:40	Graz, Austria	
Loss	13–6	Andrei Arlovski	KO (punches)	UFC 40	22 November 2002	1	1:25	Las Vegas, Nevada, United States	
Win	13–5	Frank Mir	TKO (punches)	UFC 38	13 July 2002	1	4:35	London, England	
Win	12–5	Carlos Barreto	Decision (unanimous)	HOOKnSHOOT: Kings 1	17 July 2001	3	5:00	Evansville, Indiana, United States	Won the vacant HnS Super heavyweight Championship.
Win	11–5	Stanislav Nuschik	Submission (front choke)	FFAA: Fight Night Championship 3	14 July 2001	1	1:57	Graz, Austria	
Loss	10–5	Stanislav Nuschik	KO (punch)	M-1 MFC: Russia vs. the World 1	27 April 2001	1	0:20	St. Petersburg, Russia	
Loss	10–4	Valentijn Overeem	TKO (doctor stoppage)	2 Hot 2 Handle: Simply The Best	18 March 2001	1	1:42	Rotterdam, The Netherlands	
Loss	10–3	Osami Shibuya	TKO (rib injury)	Pancrase: Proof 1	4 February 2001	1	3:51	Tokyo, Japan	
Loss	10–2	Bob Schrijber	TKO (doctor stoppage)	It's Showtime: Christmas Edition	12 December 2000	1	1:28	Haarlem, The Netherlands	
Win	10–1	Tedd Williams	Decision (unanimous)	UFC 27	22 September 2000	3	5:00	New Orleans, Louisiana, United States	
Win	9–1	Bob Stines	KO (punch)	Pancrase: 2000 Neo-Blood Tournament Opening Round	23 July 2000	1	2:38	Tokyo, Japan	
Win	8–1	Nate Schroeder	TKO (submission to punches)	UFC 26	9 June 2000	2	2:13	Cedar Rapids, Iowa, United States	
Loss	7–1	Scott Adams	Submission (Achilles lock)	UFC 24	10 March 2000	1	3:09	Lake Charles, Louisiana, United States	
Win	7–0	Travis Fulton	TKO (retirement)	Millennium Brawl 1	5 December 1999	2	5:00	England	
Win	6–0	Dave Shortby	TKO (punches)	Total Fight KRG 5	3 October 1999	1	2:02	Buckinghamshire, England	
Win	5–0	Mark Lamborn	Submission (rear-naked choke)	British Vale Tudo	28 August 1999	1	0:55	England	Won the British Vale Tudo Title.
Win	4–0	Keith Dace	Submission (guillotine choke)	British Vale Tudo	28 August 1999	1	0:46	England	
Win	3–0	Kamal Lock	Submission (ankle lock)	British Grand Prix '99	27 June 1999	1	3:55	England	Won the 1999 British Grand Prix.
Win	2–0	Scotty Smith	TKO	British Grand Prix '99	27 June 1999	1	0:09	England	
Win	1–0	Tony Bailey	Submission (guillotine choke)	British Grand Prix '99	27 June 1999	1	1:32	England	
