= 2000 in UFC =

Mixed martial arts events

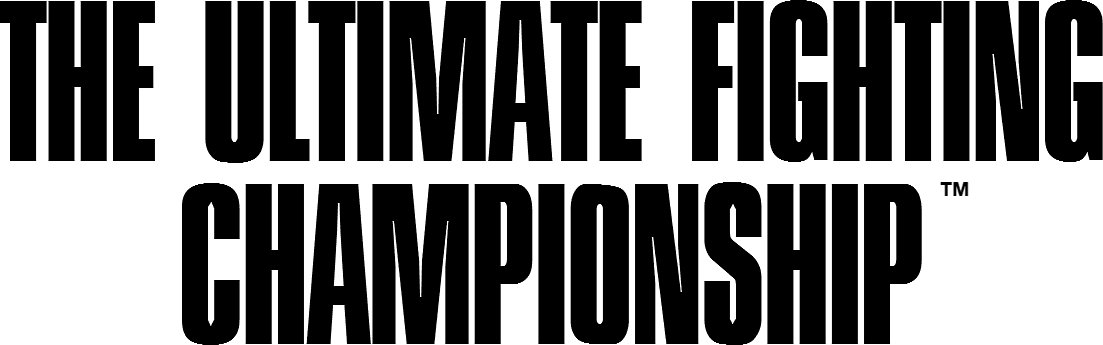

Information
- First date: March 10, 2000
- Last date: December 16, 2000

Events
- Total events: 6
- UFC: 6

Fights
- Total fights: 44
- Title fights: 6

Chronology
1999 in UFC	2000 in UFC	2001 in UFC

The year 2000 was the 8th year in the history of the Ultimate Fighting Championship (UFC), a mixed martial arts promotion based in the United States. In 2000 the UFC held 6 events beginning with, UFC 24: First Defense.

== Title fights ==
Title fights in 2000
Weight class				Method	Round	Time	Event	Notes
Light Heavyweight	Tito Ortiz	def.	Wanderlei Silva	Decision (unanimous)	5	5:00	UFC 25	(Note: For the vacant UFC Light Heavyweight Championship.)
Welterweight	Pat Miletich (c)	def.	John Alessio	Submission (armbar)	2	1:43	UFC 26	(Note: For the UFC Welterweight Championship.)
Heavyweight	Kevin Randleman (c)	def.	Pedro Rizzo	Decision (unanimous)	5	5:00	UFC 26	(Note: For the UFC Heavyweight Championship.)
Heavyweight	Randy Couture	def.	Kevin Randleman (c)	TKO (punches)	3	4:13	UFC 28	(Note: For the UFC Heavyweight Championship.)
Welterweight	Pat Miletich (c)	def.	Kenichi Yamamoto	Submission (guillotine choke)	2	1:57	UFC 29	(Note: For the UFC Welterweight Championship.)
Light Heavyweight	Tito Ortiz (c)	def.	Yuki Kondo	Submission (cobra choke)	1	1:51	UFC 29	(Note: For the UFC Light Heavyweight Championship.)

== Debut UFC fighters ==
The following fighters fought their first UFC fight in 2000:

ISO	Fighter	Division
(United States)	Aaron Brink	Heavyweight
(United States)	Adrian Serrano	Middleweight
(United States)	Alex Stiebling	Middleweight
(Brazil)	Alexandre Dantas	Heavyweight
(Belarus)	Andrei Arlovski	Heavyweight
(United States)	Ben Earwood	Lightweight
(United States)	Bob Cook	Lightweight
(United States)	Bobby Hoffman	Heavyweight
(United States)	Brad Gumm	Welterweight
(United States)	Chris Lytle	Welterweight
(United States)	CJ Fernandes	Lightweight
(United States)	Dave Menne	Middleweight
(United States)	David Dodd	Middleweight

ISO	Fighter	Division
(United States)	David Velasquez	Lightweight
(United States)	Dennis Hallman	Welterweight
(United States)	Gan McGee	Heavyweight
(England)	Ian Freeman	Heavyweight
(Japan)	Ikuhisa Minowa	Middleweight
(United States)	Jeff Monson	Heavyweight
(United States)	Jermaine Andre	Middleweight
(Brazil)	Joao Roque	Lightweight
(Canada)	John Alessio	Lightweight
(United States)	Josh Barnett	Heavyweight
(Japan)	Koji Oishi	Lightweight
(Canada)	Lance Gibson	Lightweight
(Brazil)	Marcelo Aguiar	Welterweight

ISO	Fighter	Division
(United States)	Matt Lindland	Middleweight
(Brazil)	Murilo Bustamante	Middleweight
(United States)	Nate Schroeder	Lightweight
(Brazil)	Renato Sobral	Light Heavyweight
(Japan)	Sanae Kikuta	Middleweight
(Japan)	Satoshi Honma	Middleweight
(United States)	Scott Adams	Heavyweight
(United States)	Shonie Carter	Welterweight
(United States)	Tedd Williams	Heavyweight
(United States)	Tiki Ghosn	Lightweight
(United States)	Tyrone Roberts	Middleweight
(Japan)	Yuki Kondo	Middleweight

== Events list ==
#	Event	Date	Venue	Location	Attendance
033	UFC 29: Defense of the Belts	Dec 16, 2000	Differ Ariake Arena	Tokyo, Japan	1,414
032	UFC 28: High Stakes	Nov 17, 2000	Trump Taj Mahal Casino Resort	Atlantic City, New Jersey, U.S.	—N/a
031	UFC 27: Ultimate Bad Boyz	Sep 22, 2000	Lakefront Arena	New Orleans, Louisiana, U.S.	—N/a
030	UFC 26: Ultimate Field Of Dreams	Jun 9, 2000	Five Seasons Events Center	Cedar Rapids, Iowa, U.S.	1,100
029	UFC 25: Ultimate Japan 3	Apr 14, 2000	Yoyogi National Gymnasium	Tokyo, Japan	—N/a
028	UFC 24: First Defense	Mar 10, 2000	Lake Charles Civic Center	Lake Charles, Louisiana, U.S.	—N/a

== UFC 27: Ultimate Bad Boyz ==
UFC 27 was an event held in New Orleans, Louisiana, on September 22, 2000, and the last event held by the UFC before its adoption of the new "Unified Rules of Mixed Martial Arts".

=== Results ===
Main Card
Weight class				Method	Round	Time	Notes
Heavyweight	Pedro Rizzo	def.	Dan Severn	TKO (leg kicks)	1	1:33
Heavyweight	Maurice Smith	def.	Bobby Hoffman	Decision (Majority)	3	5:00
Middleweight	Jeremy Horn	def.	Eugene Jackson	Submission (armbar)	1	4:32	(Note: Light Heavyweight under modern classification)
Lightweight	Fabiano Iha	def.	LaVerne Clark	Submission (armbar)	1	1:10	(Note: Welterweight under modern classification)
Middleweight	Yuki Kondo	def.	Alexandre Dantas	TKO (Punches)	3	2:28	(Note: Light Heavyweight under modern classification)
Heavyweight	Ian Freeman	def.	Tedd Williams	Decision (Unanimous)	3	5:00
Preliminary Card
Heavyweight	Jeff Monson	def.	Tim Lajcik	Decision (Unanimous)	3	5:00
Lightweight	Brad Gumm	vs	CJ Fernandes	Draw	3	5:00	(Note: Welterweight under modern classification)

== See also ==
- UFC
- List of UFC champions
- List of UFC events
