= UFC 24 =

UFC mixed martial arts event in 2000

UFC 24: First Defense
- The poster for UFC 24: First Defense
- Promotion: Ultimate Fighting Championship
- Date: March 10, 2000
- Venue: Lake Charles Civic Center
- City: Lake Charles, Louisiana

Event chronology
UFC 23: Ultimate Japan 2	UFC 24: First Defense	UFC 25: Ultimate Japan 3

UFC 24: First Defense was a mixed martial arts event held by the Ultimate Fighting Championship on March 10, 2000, at the Lake Charles Civic Center in Lake Charles, Louisiana.

== History ==
The event featured the first UFC appearances of Ian Freeman, future UFC Middleweight Champion Dave Menne and Shonie Carter. UFC 24 also featured the first televised appearance of Jens Pulver, who had fought in an untelevised preliminary bout at UFC 22.

The name "First Defense" refers to a scheduled Heavyweight title Bout between Kevin Randleman and Pedro Rizzo, which did not happen due to injury. While warming up backstage during the event, Randleman slipped on the concrete floor and hit his head, knocking himself out completely. Randleman was taken by ambulance to the hospital, where he was revived, and diagnosed with a concussion. As the incident happened during the broadcast, fans in attendance and viewers watching on pay-per-view were not notified until the end of the show. The bout was rescheduled and took place at UFC 26.

This event also marked the appearance of Dan Severn as a referee for the preliminary bouts. Unlike the traditional solid black garb of a UFC referee, he wore black and white stripes and red shoes.

UFC 24 was initially seen live on pay per view, but was not released on home video at the time. A double DVD with UFC 23 and 24 was released in 2007.

== Results ==
Main Card
Weight class				Method	Round	Time	Notes
Heavyweight	Tedd Williams	def.	Steve Judson	TKO (punches)	1	3:23
Middleweight	Lance Gibson	def.	Jermaine Andre	KO (knee)	3	3:35
Lightweight	Dave Menne	def.	Fabiano Iha	Decision (unanimous)	3	5:00
Lightweight	Bob Cook	def.	Tiki Ghosn	Submission (rear-naked choke)	2	1:29
Lightweight	Jens Pulver	def.	David Velasquez	TKO (punches)	2	2:41
Preliminary Card
Heavyweight	Scott Adams	def.	Ian Freeman	Submission (achilles lock)	1	3:09
Lightweight	Shonie Carter	def.	Brad Gumm	Decision (unanimous)	2	5:00

== Encyclopedia awards ==
The following fighters were honored in the October 2011 book titled UFC Encyclopedia.

- Fight of the Night: Bob Cook vs. Tiki Ghosn
- Knockout of the Night: Lance Gibson
- Submission of the Night: Scott Adams

== See also ==
- Ultimate Fighting Championship
- List of UFC champions
- List of UFC events
- 2000 in UFC
