= Britain's Hardest =

- Genre: Game show
- Presented by: Steve McFadden
- Starring: Ian Freeman
- Country of origin: United Kingdom
- Original language: English
- No. of series: 1
- No. of episodes: 10

Production
- Running time: 60 minutes (inc. adverts)
- Production company: Zeal Television

Original release
- Network: Sky One
- Release: 26 January – 29 March 2004

Britain's Hardest is a game show first broadcast on Sky One from 26 January to 29 March 2004. It was presented by EastEnders actor Steve McFadden and refereed by mixed martial arts fighter Ian Freeman. In the show six men competed against each other until only one remained and was declared "Britain's hardest", meaning toughest man. The prize was £10,000. The tasks the contestants had to complete included gruelling physical challenges, like hanging from a suspended object by their fingertips for the longest time. The show's tagline was "54 hard men, over 10 shows, but only one can be, Britain's Hardest".

== Winner ==
Leighton Morgan from Nelson, South Wales. Previous Welsh amateur boxing champion and professional boxer coached by Tex Woodward who also appeared supporting Leighton on the show.
BoxRec
