= UFC 28 =

UFC mixed martial arts event in 2000

UFC 28: High Stakes
- The poster for UFC 28: High Stakes
- Promotion: Ultimate Fighting Championship
- Date: November 17, 2000
- Venue: Mark G. Etess Arena
- City: Atlantic City, New Jersey

Event chronology
| UFC 27: Ultimate Bad Boyz | UFC 28: High Stakes | UFC 29: Defense of the Belts |

UFC 28: High Stakes was a mixed martial arts event held by the Ultimate Fighting Championship on November 17, 2000 at the Mark G. Etess Arena in Atlantic City, New Jersey.

== History ==
UFC 28 marked the first UFC event to be sanctioned by the New Jersey State Athletic Control Board (NJSACB). The NJSACB had begun to allow Mixed Martial Arts (MMA) promoters to conduct events in the state upon review of the promoter's rules and regulations in September 2000. The NJSACB's observation of these first few sanctioned events led to the establishment of their own official set of rules and regulations, the "Unified Rules of Mixed Martial Arts", in April 2001. The NJSACB's unified rules would become the de facto set of rules for professional MMA in North America as more and more U.S. states used them to sanction the sport.

As the event was held in New Jersey, it was the first UFC event to be held in a northern state since UFC 7. Under the sanctioned rules, this was the first event requiring competitors to wear trunks, gloves (and no other attire). The sanctioned rules also introduced new strict weight classes, resulting in the first and only UFC Super Heavyweight bout ever, between Josh Barnett and Gan McGee. The first UFC Bantamweight bout took place at UFC 26 in June 2000.

The event was headlined by the return of former Heavyweight Champion Randy Couture, who had relinquished his title in 1998 to return to competitive wrestling and because of contract disputes—and he regained his championship belt by defeating Kevin Randleman. UFC 28 also featured the first UFC appearances of Andrei Arlovski, Renato "Babalu" Sobral, Chris Lytle, Josh Barnett, and Gan McGee, and the sole appearances of Alex Stiebling, Ben Earwood, Aaron Brink, and Matt Hughes's twin brother, Mark Hughes.

While there were 5,000 tickets sold -- a sellout -- the event had a small pay-per-view reach. UFC 28 was the sixth straight UFC event to never see home video or DVD release, as their parent company SEG was nearing bankruptcy. UFC 28 was the last UFC event held by SEG in the US, and following UFC 29 in Japan, SEG sold the UFC to Zuffa LLC.

== Results ==
Main Card
| Weight class | | | | Method | Round | Time | Notes |
|---|---|---|---|---|---|---|---|
| Heavyweight | Randy Couture | def. | Kevin Randleman (c) | TKO (punches) | 3 | 4:13 | (Note: For the UFC Heavyweight Championship.) |
| Heavyweight | Renato Sobral | def. | Maurice Smith | Decision (majority) | 3 | 5:00 |
| Super Heavyweight | Josh Barnett | def. | Gan McGee | TKO (punches) | 2 | 4:34 |
| Heavyweight | Andrei Arlovski | def. | Aaron Brink | Submission (armbar) | 1 | 0:55 |
| Bantamweight | Jens Pulver | def. | John Lewis | KO (punch) | 1 | 0:15 |
Preliminary Card
| Middleweight | Mark Hughes | def. | Alex Stiebling | Decision (unanimous) | 2 | 5:00 | (Note: This bout aired on the pay-per-view event following the Barnett vs McGee fight.) |
| Lightweight | Ben Earwood | def. | Chris Lytle | Decision (unanimous) | 2 | 5:00 | (Note: This bout aired on UFC 29 after the Lightweight Championship bout between Pat Miletich vs. Kenichi Yamamoto.) |

== Encyclopedia awards ==
The following fighters were honored in the October 2011 book titled UFC Encyclopedia.

- Fight of the Night: Randy Couture vs. Kevin Randleman
- Knockout of the Night: Jens Pulver
- Submission of the Night: Andrei Arlovski

== See also ==
- Ultimate Fighting Championship
- List of UFC champions
- List of UFC events
- 2000 in UFC
