= Tedd Williams =

American mixed martial artist (born 1969)

- Born: December 19, 1969 (age 56); Long Beach, California, United States
- Other names: The American Gladiator
- Height: 6 ft 0 in (1.83 m)
- Weight: 250 lb (110 kg; 18 st)
- Division: Heavyweight
- Team: Williams Combat Grappling
- Rank: 4th degree black belt in Judo under Gene Lebell
- Years active: 1999–2000

Mixed martial arts record
- Total: 8
- Wins: 7
- By knockout: 1
- By submission: 4
- By decision: 2
- Losses: 1
- By decision: 1

Other information
- Mixed martial arts record from Sherdog
- Military career
- Allegiance: United States of America
- Branch: United States Army
- Service years: 1990–1992
- Unit: 7th Infantry Division

Tedd Williams (born December 19, 1969) is an American former mixed martial arts fighter and promoter, who has promoted Gladiator Challenge since its inception in 2000.

== Background ==
Williams attended Cerritos College, obtaining an associate degree in criminal justice. During his junior year in Cerritos, Williams was a runner-up in wrestling in the state championships.

After graduating from the community college, Williams went to the military, stationed in Fort Ord and served as a part of the 7th Infantry Division. He served from 1990 to 1992, but was never deployed to participate in the Gulf War.

Coming out of the military service, Williams moved to Hesperia, California in seek of a combat sport involving grappling. After failing to find one he founded his own school and started offering training in a sport he called combat grappling. Eventually, he competed in what is nowadays known as mixed martial arts, including appearances at UFC 24 and UFC 27. Right after he lost his final fight against Ian Freeman, he started his own promotion, Gladiator Challenge.

== Personal life ==
Williams and his wife Ceci have four sons and a daughter. Besides promoting Gladiator Challenge events, Williams works as a wrestling coach at Excelsior Charter School in Victorville, California.

== Mixed martial arts record ==
Professional record breakdown
8 matches	7 wins	1 loss
By knockout	1	0
By submission	4	0
By decision	2	1

Res.	Record	Opponent	Method	Event	Date	Round	Time	Location	Notes
Loss	7–1	Ian Freeman	Decision (unanimous)	UFC 27	September 22, 2000	3	5:00	New Orleans, Louisiana, United States	
Win	7–0	Bill Parker	Submission (armlock)	KOTC 4 - Gladiators	June 24, 2000	1	0:32	San Jacinto, California	
Win	6–0	Steve Judson	TKO (punches)	UFC 24	March 10, 2000	1	3:23	Lake Charles, Louisiana, United States	
Win	5–0	Bull Shaw	Decision	HFP - Holiday Fight Party	December 11, 1999	1	20:00		
Win	4–0	Joe Campanella	Submission (keylock)	WEF 7 - Stomp in the Swamp	October 9, 1999	1	1:48	Louisiana, United States	
Win	3–0	Travis Fulton	Decision (unanimous)	LI - Lionheart Invitational	September 1, 1999	1	20:00	Georgia, United States	
Win	2–0	Joseph Marquez	Submission (palm strikes)	BRI 3 - Bas Rutten Invitational 3	June 1, 1999	1	1:50	Colorado, United States	
Win	1–0	Robert Burnell	Submission	ESF - Empire One	May 15, 1999	1	1:23	California, United States	
