= UFC 25 =

UFC mixed martial arts event in 2000

UFC 25: Ultimate Japan 3
- The poster for UFC 25: Ultimate Japan 3
- Promotion: Ultimate Fighting Championship
- Date: April 14, 2000
- Venue: Yoyogi National Gymnasium
- City: Tokyo, Japan

Event chronology
UFC 24: First Defense	UFC 25: Ultimate Japan 3	UFC 26: Ultimate Field of Dreams

UFC 25: Ultimate Japan 3 was a mixed martial arts event held by the Ultimate Fighting Championship on April 14, 2000 at the Yoyogi National Gymnasium in Tokyo, Japan.

== History ==
The event was the third UFC event to be held in Japan.

UFC 25 was headlined by a fight between Tito Ortiz and Wanderlei Silva, held to determine the new Light Heavyweight Champion following Frank Shamrock's retirement.

The Octagon announcer was local Sanshiro Matuyama instead of the regular Bruce Buffer.

The event featured the first UFC appearance of future UFC Middleweight Champion Murilo Bustamante, as well as future PRIDE fighter Ikuhisa Minowa.

This event also featured an interview with John Perretti, the UFC matchmaker at the time.

UFC 25 was initially seen live on pay-per-view. Spike published a DVD release exclusively in Japan, with a wider video release occurring after UFC was purchased by Zuffa years later as part of a DVD collection covering events initially unreleased by SEG Sports.

== Results ==
Main Card
Weight class				Method	Round	Time	Notes
Light Heavyweight	Tito Ortiz	def.	Wanderlei Silva	Decision (unanimous)	5	5:00	(Note: For the vacant UFC Light Heavyweight Championship.)
Middleweight	Murilo Bustamante	def.	Yoji Anjo	Submission (arm-triangle choke)	2	0:31
Middleweight	Sanae Kikuta	def.	Eugene Jackson	Submission (armbar)	1	4:38
Heavyweight	Ron Waterman	def.	Satoshi Honma	Decision (unanimous)	3	5:00
Preliminary Card
Middleweight	Ikuhisa Minowa	def.	Joe Slick	TKO (referee stoppage due to cut)	3	2:02
Lightweight	LaVerne Clark	def.	Koji Oishi	Decision (majority)	3	5:00

== Encyclopedia awards ==
The following fighters were honored in the October 2011 book titled UFC Encyclopedia.

- Fight of the Night: Tito Ortiz vs. Wanderlei Silva
- Knockout of the Night: Ikuhisa Minowa
- Submission of the Night: Murilo Bustamante

== See also ==
- Ultimate Fighting Championship
- List of UFC champions
- List of UFC events
- 2000 in UFC
