= UFC 29 =

UFC mixed martial arts event in 2000

UFC 29: Defense of the Belts
- The poster for UFC 29: Defense of the Belts
- Promotion: Ultimate Fighting Championship
- Date: December 16, 2000
- Venue: Differ Ariake Arena
- City: Tokyo, Japan
- Attendance: 1,414

Event chronology
UFC 28: High Stakes	UFC 29: Defense of the Belts	UFC 30: Battle on the Boardwalk

UFC 29: Defense of the Belts was a mixed martial arts event held by the Ultimate Fighting Championship on December 16, 2000 at Differ Ariake Arena in Kōtō ward, Tokyo, Japan.

== History ==
The event was the last UFC to be held in Japan until the UFC visited the country again during UFC 144, and the last event to be promoted by "UFC-J", the UFC's Japanese counterpart. As the name implies, the card featured two title defenses, featuring Light Heavyweight Champion Tito Ortiz, and Lightweight Champion Pat Miletich.

UFC 29 is notable for featuring one of the few UFC losses by future longtime Welterweight Champion Matt Hughes, who was submitted in just 20 seconds by Dennis Hallman. The event also featured the first televised UFC appearance of Olympic silver medalist Matt Lindland. It was also the first UFC card to have music played in between rounds, and a different theme than the standard UFC entrance theme. A local ring announcer was used instead of the usual Bruce Buffer.

UFC 29 was broadcast in Japan on January 7, 2001, well after the event, by the Japanese satellite television channel Sky Sports, now known as J Sports.

UFC 29 was the seventh straight UFC event to have never seen a home video or DVD release, as their parent company SEG was nearing bankruptcy. UFC 29 was the last UFC event held by SEG; in January 2001, SEG sold the UFC to new owners Zuffa LLC.

== Results ==
Main Card
Weight class				Method	Round	Time	Notes
Light Heavyweight	Tito Ortiz (c)	def.	Yuki Kondo	Submission (cobra choke)	1	1:52	(Note: For the UFC Light Heavyweight Championship.)
Welterweight	Pat Miletich (c)	def.	Kenichi Yamamoto	Submission (guillotine choke)	2	1:58	(Note: For the UFC Welterweight Championship.)
Light Heavyweight	Matt Lindland	def.	Yoji Anjo	TKO (strikes)	1	2:58
Welterweight	Fabiano Iha	def.	Daiju Takase	TKO (strikes)	1	2:24
Light Heavyweight	Evan Tanner	def.	Lance Gibson	TKO (strikes)	1	4:48
Preliminary Card
Welterweight	Dennis Hallman	def.	Matt Hughes	Submission (armbar)	1	0:20
Light Heavyweight	Chuck Liddell	def.	Jeff Monson	Decision (unanimous)	3	5:00

== Encyclopedia awards ==
The following fighters were honored in the October 2011 book titled UFC Encyclopedia.

- Fight of the Night: Tito Ortiz vs. Yuki Kondo
- Knockout of the Night: Fabiano Iha
- Submission of the Night: Dennis Hallman

== See also ==
- Ultimate Fighting Championship
- List of UFC champions
- List of UFC events
- 2000 in UFC
