= Celebrity Wrestling =

British professional wrestling television show

- Presented by: Kate Thornton; Rowdy Roddy Piper
- Starring: Ian Freeman
- Country of origin: United Kingdom
- Original language: English
- No. of series: 1
- No. of episodes: 8

Production
- Running time: 60mins (inc. comms)

Original release
- Network: ITV
- Release: 23 April – 12 June 2005

Celebrity Wrestling is a British television programme, broadcast on ITV in 2005. It involved two teams of celebrities, competing against each other in wrestling style events. The series was presented by Kate Thornton and Rowdy Roddy Piper. British mixed martial arts fighter Ian Freeman was the show's referee.

The aftershow programme on ITV2, called Celebrity Wrestling: Bring It On was presented by Jack Osbourne and Holly Willoughby. The winning team was The Warriors and the winning wrestlers were Annabel Croft (Solitaire) and Iwan Thomas (The Dragon).

It was received with a feeling of derision by professional wrestling fans, due to the lack of actual wrestling content. The show featured heavily upon games which involved grappling and the real life interactions of team members in training (and usually not the training process itself).

After five weeks the show was moved from its primetime Saturday evening slot to a graveyard Sunday morning slot due to its extremely poor ratings and being comprehensively beaten in audience share by Doctor Who on BBC One.

== Teams ==
Bold indicates that the celebrity won their gender championship

=== Crusaders ===
This team was trained by wrestler D'Lo Brown

Celebrity	Ring Name
Jeff Brazier	Pocket Rocket
Tiffany Chapman	Princess of Power
Leilani Dowding	The Vixen
Mikey Green	Wild Boy
Michelle Heaton	Inferno
James Hewitt	Gentleman Jim
Jenny Powell	The Avenger
Lee Sharpe	Sharpe Shooter
Scott Wright	Snake Eyes

=== Warriors ===
This team was trained by wrestler Joe Legend

Celebrity	Ring Name
Marc Bannerman	El Diablo
**Annabel Croft**	Solitaire
Kate Lawler	The Brawler
Shauna Lowry	Tigress
Victoria Silvstedt	Ice Maiden
Oliver Skeete	Rebel Rider
**Iwan Thomas**	The Dragon
Phil Turner	The Handy Man
Mark Speight	The Quickdraw Kid

== Masked Celebrity ==
Each week there was a "mystery celebrity" who joined in the wrestling. The celebrities included:

- Fatima Whitbread
- John Fashanu
- Neil Ruddock
- Antonia Okonma
- Terri Dwyer
- Fran Cosgrave

== Other participants ==
- Model Emma B took part in one episode as a replacement for Victoria Silvstedt using the character name Queen Bee.
- Radio DJ Toby Anstis was set to appear in the series, but had to pull out when he broke two of his fingers.
- The UK Pitbulls tag team appeared on the follow-up show with Jack Osbourne and Holly Willoughby.

== See also ==
- List of professional wrestling television series
