= Jens Pulver =

American mixed martial arts fighter (born 1974)

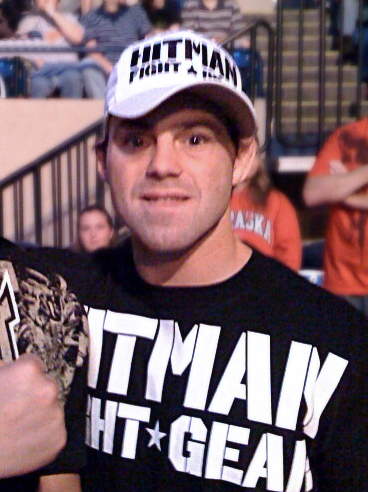
- Pulver in 2013
- Born: December 6, 1974 (age 51); Sunnyside, Washington, U.S.
- Other names: Little Evil
- Height: 5 ft 7 in (1.70 m)
- Weight: 135 lb (61 kg; 9.6 st)
- Division: Flyweight (2012); Bantamweight (2011–2014); Featherweight (2007–2013); Lightweight (1999–2007)
- Reach: 67 in (170 cm)
- Stance: Southpaw
- Fighting out of: Crystal Lake, Illinois
- Team: Shamrock 2000 (1999–2000); Miletich Fighting Systems (2000–2010); Team Curran (2010–2014)
- Trainer: Boxing: Doug Mango
- Years active: 1999–2014

Professional boxing record
- Total: 4
- Wins: 4
- By knockout: 3

Kickboxing record
- Total: 1
- Wins: 1
- By knockout: 1

Mixed martial arts record
- Total: 47
- Wins: 27
- By knockout: 14
- By submission: 4
- By decision: 9
- Losses: 19
- By knockout: 8
- By submission: 9
- By decision: 2
- Draws: 1

Other information
- Boxing record from BoxRec
- Mixed martial arts record from Sherdog

Jens Johnnie Pulver (born December 6, 1974) is an American retired professional mixed martial artist and undefeated boxer and kickboxer. In 2023, Pulver was inducted into the UFC hall of fame. Pulver was the inaugural UFC Lightweight Champion in addition to serving as the head coach on The Ultimate Fighter 5 reality show against long-time rival B.J. Penn. In mixed martial arts, Pulver competed at the Lightweight, Featherweight, Bantamweight and Flyweight divisions in addition to competing at the Middleweight, Light Middleweight, and Welterweight divisions as a professional boxer. While perhaps best known for competing in the UFC, Pulver has also competed in Pride Fighting Championships, for the PRIDE 2005 Lightweight Grand Prix. He is to-date the youngest UFC Lightweight Champion in the UFC history, eventually relinquishing his title, after two defenses, due to a contract dispute. Pulver officially retired from combat sports in 2014.

Nicknamed 'Little Evil', Pulver won the first UFC Lightweight Championship following his victory over Caol Uno at UFC 30: Battle on the Boardwalk. Pulver also held the UFC's all-time lightweight title defenses record for nearly a decade after his successful defenses against Dennis Hallman at UFC 33: Victory in Vegas and B.J. Penn at UFC 35: Throwdown. He remains as one of the most influential figures in the Ultimate Fighting Championship, due to his domination and undefeated reign as UFC Lightweight Champion in the early Zuffa era.

== Background ==
The son of a licensed horse jockey, Jens Pulver was born in Sunnyside, Washington, and grew up in Maple Valley, Washington (approximately an hour's drive from Seattle). He was the oldest of four children, two brothers, Dustin and Abel, and one sister, Jamaica.

Pulver was raised in what he referred to as a "daily hell." His childhood house was one of continual violence and abuse, stemming mostly from his alcoholic father. Many examples of the abuse Pulver faced as a youth are depicted in his autobiography, Little Evil, One Ultimate Fighter's Rise to the Top, the most extreme of which include an incident where his father threatened the then-seven-year-old Jens by placing a shotgun in Jens' mouth and then removing it, stating, "Shit, ain't worth a bullet."

== Martial arts background ==
The summer before he entered sixth grade, Pulver was introduced to a friend of the family, Jack Vantress. Vantress encouraged Pulver to join a youth wrestling program. He went on to wrestle at Tahoma Senior High School in Maple Valley, earning two state championships at 135lbs in 1991 and 1992. He also began boxing when he was a junior. Pulver wrestled for Highline Community College where he became an NJCAA All-American by placing 3rd at 142lbs in 1997 at the NJCAA National Championships. He then wrestled for Boise State University (BSU), before he suffered a bilateral fracture of the wrists that eventually ended his collegiate career. Pulver eventually graduated from BSU with a degree in criminal justice.

While in college, Pulver's interests shifted from wrestling to mixed martial arts. He found early success fighting in unsanctioned "underground" events, before befriending Lowell Anderson, the owner of a Brazilian jiu-jitsu (BJJ) academy ninety miles north of Boise, Idaho. Lowell got Pulver involved in sanctioned MMA events, namely the Bas Rutten Invitational in April 1999. Pulver won one match, then lost the second due to his lack of martial arts training. He fought again in the third incarnation of the Bas Rutten Invitational, winning both his fights and impressing then-UFC matchmaker, John Perretti.

Pulver moved to Lockeford, California, in 1999 where he briefly trained at the Lion's Den and then joined Shamrock 2000, a short lived camp formed by Bob Shamrock (the foster father of Ken and Frank Shamrock) Kevin Woo, and Dr. Ron Emmerson. Pulver noted that there was a little kid who would show up at the gym to hit the bags in those days named Nick Diaz with his younger brother Nate, both of whom later became MMA stars. Pulver, who hated his name because it was the same as his father's, even asked Bob at one point if he could take the Shamrock name since Bob was the first real father figure he felt he ever had. Bob told him: "You go out there and make the Pulver name mean something good." Pulver would later go on to become the first 155-pound champion in UFC history. Pulver wanted to fight full-time, but they did not have the right training partners for him. Shamrock put him in contact with Monte Cox and sent him to Iowa, where Pat Miletich was starting a camp where he could train full-time.

== Professional career ==
Pulver began competing in the UFC in September 1999. He fought four times in the UFC before gaining a title shot against top ranked Caol Uno in February 2001. Pulver won the title by unanimous decision, becoming the first UFC Lightweight Champion. He defended his title twice against Dennis Hallman and B.J. Penn before leaving the organization due to contractual problems. Pulver became famous for his combination of defensive wrestling and boxing strategies colloquially called "sprawl and brawl" in MMA circles.

=== Pulver vs. Hallman ===
Pulver's first title defense came against Dennis Hallman who is best known for his two wins against former UFC Welterweight Champion Matt Hughes).

Following a second win over Hughes, Hallman dropped down a weight class and fought Pulver for the Lightweight Championship in September 2001. Pulver and Hallman had both wrestled in the same state (Washington) in high school. In pre-fight interviews, Hallman claimed to personally know and dislike Pulver, but Pulver denied any personal relationship, instead asserting that he only knew Hallman as a fellow state high school wrestling champion.

During the fight, Hallman secured an armbar on Pulver, but Pulver countered the technique and later landed a left hook flush on Hallman's chin. Hallman fought passively for the remainder of the fight, seemingly unable to recover completely from that blow, and Pulver eventually won by unanimous decision.

=== Pulver vs. Penn ===
Pulver's second title defense came against B.J. Penn. Before his transition to mixed martial arts, Penn was the most highly decorated Brazilian jiu-jitsu practitioner in America and the first American-born to win the World IBJJF Jiu-Jitsu Championship.

Upon his impressive debut against wrestler Joey Gilbert, finishing him with a first-round TKO, Penn rose quickly through the rankings. Penn, already known for his grappling, quickly stunned the MMA community by showcasing incredible striking skills; quickly knocking out highly regarded Din Thomas, then knocking out Caol Uno within eleven seconds of the first round. Heading into the fight with Pulver, Penn had never fought longer than the first round. The speed in which Penn was defeating opponents had many MMA journalists suggesting he was unbeatable.

Pulver's performance in the fight is considered the high point of his career. Penn pressed the action early; taking Pulver to the mat numerous times, achieving a full mount on him twice in the second round and securing a straight armbar, completely hyper-extending Pulver's arm as the seconds ticked off the clock ending the second round.

Pulver battled back in the third round, successfully defending Penn's attempts to take him to the ground, and even scoring defensive takedowns on Penn. Pulver frustrated Penn with nothing more than sheer will power, not only winning the later rounds, but out-grappling the world-renowned Penn. In the fifth round, Penn, frustrated and down on points, chose to stand and trade with Pulver. For the entire five minutes of the fifth round the two stood toe to toe exchanging strikes. With 45 seconds left in the round, a left hand from Pulver staggered Penn, who looked in trouble. However, Penn countered with a right kick straight to the groin, resulting in a 50-second time-out. Although the time-out gave Penn time to recover, when the bout was restarted, Pulver staggered him a second time with 20 seconds remaining. However, the round drew to a conclusion and the fight went into the judges' hands.

Pulver won the fight via majority decision. Breaking into tears during the post-fight interview, Pulver shouted, "On the ground again!...I've been beat on my whole life, this is nothing."

=== Leaving the UFC ===
Pulver was expected to fight at UFC 38 on July 13, 2002, but after the company declined a pay raise request and missed the prevailing contract's option exercising period, Pulver left the UFC. After leaving, Pulver's career slumped slightly with two consecutive losses. He regained his winning ways by dropping down a weight class (to 145 lb). Along the same time, Pulver also began competing as a professional boxer, winning all four of his fights in 2004, including a fight on the nationally syndicated USA Network. During this time Pulver fought in various other MMA promotions, including Shooto, and the IFL, as well as one match in the Shootboxing kickboxing promotion, where he defeated 2004 Sanda champion Dai Chang Liang. After this match, Pulver moved back up to the lightweight division in December 2004 in Pride.

=== Pride ===
His first match in Pride was against then current and last Pride lightweight (160 lb) champion Takanori Gomi. Pulver and Gomi demonstrated excellent boxing skills and were both regarded as putting on the best boxing fight in an MMA bout. This was stopped short when Gomi delivered a vicious uppercut that knocked out Pulver 6:29 into the first round. This led to a match against Tomomi Iwama, in which he defeated his opponent via knock out one minute into the fight with a left hook.

He then faced Japanese star Hayato Sakurai, and would go on to lose in a fast paced see-saw affair that showcased both the toughness and heart of Pulver, and the experience and technicality of Sakurai. During the fight, Pulver was accidentally thumbed in the eye by Sakurai which left a corneal abrasion on his eye. Despite the injury Pulver still managed to knock down Sakurai with a left hook in the latter part of the first round, though Sakurai eventually won via TKO.

His final fight in Pride, against Kenji Arai, was an entertaining battle of strikers which ended when Pulver knocked Arai down with a right-left combination, and finished him with a soccer kick to the head, earning the TKO.

=== Return to the UFC ===
At UFC 63, Pulver returned to the Ultimate Fighting Championship in the newly reinstated lightweight division. He was matched up against UFC-newcomer Joe Lauzon. Pulver was a 7:1 favorite to win the match, but Lauzon quickly defeated the former Lightweight Champion via one punch knockout at the 48-second mark of the first round. After the fight, Pulver apologized for his performance and indicated that he still desired to keep fighting in the UFC.

Pulver was a coach on The Ultimate Fighter 5 reality television show, which hosted sixteen lightweight fighters, including the man who knocked him out previously, Joe Lauzon. His counterpart on the show and rival coach, was B.J. Penn whom Pulver defeated previously. The two coaches were scheduled to fight in the season finale, in which Pulver was defeated by a rear naked choke in the second round. After the fight, Pulver announced his intentions to drop down to featherweight and fight in the WEC. He also made overtures toward Penn to set aside their differences and train together but Pulver has also said that he would welcome a third fight with Penn.

In UFC 284, UFC announced Pulver will be inducted into the Pioneer Wing of the UFC Hall of Fame this July during the 11th annual UFC International Fight Week in Las Vegas. Pulver learned about his induction while conducting a watch-along live stream on the UFC's official Twitch.TV channel.

=== World Extreme Cagefighting ===
On July 17, 2007, it was announced Pulver would be making his World Extreme Cagefighting debut against Cub Swanson at WEC 30 on September 5, 2007. Pulver had to pull out of the match with Cub Swanson due to a knee injury. The fight was subsequently rescheduled for WEC 31. Pulver won the rescheduled match by guillotine choke at 35 seconds of the first round and announced his intentions to make a run for the 145 lb title which Urijah Faber currently held and had defended successfully against Pulver's teammate and longtime Jiu-Jitsu coach, Jeff Curran on the same card.

Pulver and Faber finally met at WEC 34 on June 1, 2008. Neither man was able to finish the other and the fight went the full five rounds. The judges scored the bout a unanimous decision for Faber, 50–45, 50–44 and 50–44. This fight marked the first time that one of Pulver's fights at featherweight had gone to decision, the first time Pulver had been defeated at that weight class and also the first time one of Faber's fights in the WEC had gone the distance. Pulver stated after the fight that he wanted another shot at the title, but wanted "to earn it".

Pulver next fought infamous brawler Leonard Garcia at WEC 36 on November 5, after the original date of September 10 was postponed due to the threat of Hurricane Ike. In a surprising turn of events, Pulver suffered a TKO loss in the first round as the Greg Jackson-trained Leonard Garcia stunned Pulver with a left-right combination, then swarmed Pulver with more punches against the cage fence.

At WEC 38, Pulver once again lost to Faber in a rematch of their WEC 34 encounter when Pulver succumbed to a guillotine choke early in the first round.

After his second loss to Faber, Pulver temporarily replaced Frank Mir as color commentator at WEC 39.

At WEC 41, Pulver was submitted by Josh Grispi via Guillotine Choke within the first minute of the match. "I think I just ended in the same place I started," Pulver said emotionally to the crowd after losing 8 of his past 12 encounters. "I’m not saying I’m done yet, but it’s been incredible."

Pulver returned at WEC 47 to face Brazilian Jiu-Jitsu black belt Javier Vazquez on March 6, 2010. Pulver lost via submission due to an armbar at 3:41 of the first round. Pulver has lost 9 out his last 13 fights.

In the aftermath of Pulver's loss at WEC 47, UFC President Dana White confirmed that Pulver had been released from the WEC.

=== Independent Promotions ===
Pulver met Diego Garijo on August 14, 2010, in Irvine, California, losing the bout by submission via guillotine choke in the first round. This was Pulver's sixth straight loss.

Pulver was next scheduled to face Frank Johnson at CFX/Extreme Challenge 170 on December 11 at the Target Center in Minneapolis, Minnesota. But Pulver pulled out of the fight for unknown reasons and was replaced by Mitch Jackson.

Pulver headlined XFO 38 against Mike Lindquist on January 22, 2011, where he won the fight via rear naked choke submission at 0:49 in the first round. This marked Pulver's first victory in just over 3 years, snapping a 6 fight losing streak.

On March 5, 2011, Pulver defeated Wade Choate by split decision despite breaking his foot in the first round of the fight. The victory marks his second consecutive win.

Pulver fought fellow World Extreme Cagefighting veteran, Coty Wheeler at MMA Fight Pit presents "Genesis" on August 13, 2011, in New Mexico. Pulver won the fight via 2nd-round TKO in a dominant performance.

Pulver fought Tim Elliott at Resurrection Fighting Alliance on December 16, 2011, and lost the fight via second-round knockout by a knee to the temple. In a post fight speech, Elliott thanked Jens for accepting the fight, and referred to him as his number one inspiration for being a mixed martial artist.

On March 26, 2012, it was announced that Pulver had signed with UK promotion Cage Warriors.

On April 14, 2012, Pulver defeated All Army Combatives Flyweight Champion Jesse Thorton by unanimous decision in Fort Hood, Texas.

=== ONE Fighting Championship ===
On August 31, 2012, Pulver moved back up to 145 lbs to face undefeated Filipino fighter Eric Kelly in his own country. Pulver hung in tough with Kelly but fell in the second round to a TKO after Kelly landed a solid body kick followed up with some punches.

On October 6, 2012, Pulver returned to ONE Championship in entering their Bantamweight Grand Prix. Jens took on Chinese prospect Zhao Ya Fei. Pulver won a technical decision after taking an illegal groin strike and the fight went to the judges score cards in the third round.

Pulver faced Masakatsu Ueda in the Bantamweight Grand Prix Semifinals on April 5, 2013, at ONE Fighting Championship: Kings and Champions. He lost the fight by D'Arce choke submission.

== Personal life ==
Pulver has a daughter. He married in 2009. He and his wife have a boy who was born December 16, 2008.

Pulver has heterochromia, a harmless medical condition that gives eyes different colors; in Pulver's case his right eye is blue, while his left eye is brown.

Pulver is featured in a documentary about his training camp, personal life and difficult childhood called "Jens Pulver: Driven."

In 2014, Pulver makes a cameo on season four of The Vanilla Ice Project on DIY Network. He is a part of a computer case and video gaming team called Red Harbinger and goes by the gamer name, "Little Evil". He and his team are called in by Rob Van Winkle (aka Vanilla Ice) to supply custom computers for a video game room Winkle designed in a mansion he renovated in Palm Beach, Florida.

== Championships and accomplishments ==
- Ultimate Fighting Championship
  - UFC Hall of Fame (Pioneer wing, Class of 2023)
  - UFC Lightweight Championship (One time; first)
    - Two successful title defenses
    - First UFC Lightweight Champion to defend the title in UFC History
    - Tied (Frankie Edgar & Justin Gaethje) for third most UFC lightweight title fight wins (5)
  - First Lightweight to headline a UFC Event vs. B.J. Penn
  - UFC Encyclopedia Awards
    - Fight of the Night (One time) vs. B.J. Penn
    - Knockout of the Night (One time) vs. John Lewis
- PRIDE Fighting Championship
  - PRIDE 2005 Lightweight Grand Prix Quarterfinalist
  - One of only two UFC Lightweight Champions to compete in PRIDE FC
- World Extreme Cagefighting
  - Fight of the Night (One time)
- ONE Fighting Championship
  - ONE FC Bantamweight Grand Prix Semifinalist
- MMA Fighting
  - 2002 Lightweight Fighter of the Year
- Fight Matrix
  - 2002 Most Noteworthy Match of Year vs. B.J. Penn on January 11, 2002

== Mixed martial arts record ==
Professional record breakdown
47 matches	27 wins	19 losses
By knockout	14	8
By submission	4	9
By decision	9	2
Draws	1	

Res.	Record	Opponent	Method	Event	Date	Round	Time	Location	Notes
Loss	27–19–1	Sami Aziz	Decision (unanimous)	Superior Challenge 9: Gothenburg	November 23, 2013	3	5:00	Gothenburg, Sweden	
Loss	27–18–1	Masakatsu Ueda	Submission (brabo choke)	ONE FC: Kings and Champions	April 5, 2013	2	3:52	Kallang, Singapore	ONE FC Bantamweight Grand Prix semifinal.
Win	27–17–1	Zhao Ya Fei	Technical Decision (unanimous)	ONE FC: Rise of Kings	October 6, 2012	3	5:00	Kallang, Singapore	ONE FC Bantamweight Grand Prix round one.
Loss	26–17–1	Eric Kelly	TKO (body kick and punches)	ONE FC: Pride of a Nation	August 31, 2012	2	1:46	Quezon City, Philippines	Featherweight bout.
Win	26–16–1	Jesse Thorton	Decision (unanimous)	Operation: Fight Night	April 14, 2012	3	5:00	Fort Hood, Texas, United States	Flyweight debut.
Loss	25–16–1	Tim Elliott	KO (knee)	Resurrection Fight Alliance	December 16, 2011	2	2:12	Kearney, Nebraska, United States	
Win	25–15–1	Coty Wheeler	TKO (punches)	MMA Fight Pit: Genesis	August 13, 2011	2	1:59	Albuquerque, New Mexico, United States	Bantamweight debut.
Loss	24–15–1	Brian Davidson	Submission (rear-naked choke)	Titan Fighting Championships 18	May 27, 2011	1	4:00	Kansas City, Kansas, United States	
Win	24–14–1	Wade Choate	Decision (split)	Chicago Cagefighting Championship III	March 5, 2011	3	5:00	Villa Park, Illinois, United States	
Win	23–14–1	Mike Lindquist	Submission (rear-naked choke)	XFO: 38	January 22, 2011	1	0:49	Woodstock, Illinois, United States	
Loss	22–14–1	Diego Garijo	Submission (guillotine choke)	Powerhouse World Promotions: War on the Mainland	August 14, 2010	1	1:08	Irvine, California, United States	
Loss	22–13–1	Javier Vazquez	Submission (armbar)	WEC 47	March 6, 2010	1	3:41	Columbus, Ohio, United States	
Loss	22–12–1	Josh Grispi	Submission (guillotine choke)	WEC 41	June 7, 2009	1	0:33	Sacramento, California, United States	
Loss	22–11–1	Urijah Faber	Submission (guillotine choke)	WEC 38	January 25, 2009	1	1:34	San Diego, California, United States	
Loss	22–10–1	Leonard Garcia	TKO (punches)	WEC 36: Faber vs. Brown	November 5, 2008	1	1:12	Hollywood, Florida, United States	
Loss	22–9–1	Urijah Faber	Decision (unanimous)	WEC 34: Faber vs. Pulver	June 1, 2008	5	5:00	Sacramento, California, United States	For the WEC Featherweight Championship; Fight of the Night.
Win	22–8–1	Cub Swanson	Submission (anaconda choke)	WEC 31	December 12, 2007	1	0:23	Las Vegas, Nevada, United States	Featherweight debut.
Loss	21–8–1	B.J. Penn	Submission (rear-naked choke)	The Ultimate Fighter 5 Finale	June 23, 2007	2	3:12	Las Vegas, Nevada, United States	TUF 5 coaches fight.
Loss	21–7–1	Joe Lauzon	KO (punch)	UFC 63: Hughes vs. Penn	September 23, 2006	1	0:48	Anaheim, California, United States	
Win	21–6–1	Cole Escovedo	KO (punch)	IFL: Legends Championship 2006	April 29, 2006	1	0:56	Atlantic City, New Jersey, United States	
Win	20–6–1	Kenji Arai	KO (soccer kick)	Pride - Bushido 10	April 2, 2006	1	3:59	Tokyo, Japan	
Loss	19–6–1	Hayato Sakurai	TKO (punches)	Pride Bushido 9	September 25, 2005	1	8:56	Tokyo, Japan	Pride 2005 Lightweight Grand Prix Quarterfinals.
Win	19–5–1	Tomomi Iwama	KO (punch)	Pride Bushido 7	May 22, 2005	1	1:00	Tokyo, Japan	
Loss	18–5–1	Takanori Gomi	KO (punch)	Pride Shockwave 2004	December 31, 2004	1	6:29	Saitama City, Saitama, Japan	
Win	18–4–1	Stephen Palling	KO (punch)	Shooto Hawaii: Soljah Fight Night	July 9, 2004	3	1:47	Honolulu, Hawaii, United States	
Win	17–4–1	Naoya Uematsu	KO (punch)	Shooto: 3/22 in Korakuen Hall	March 22, 2004	1	2:09	Tokyo, Japan	
Win	16–4–1	Richard Hess	Submission (choke)	International Fighting Championships: Battleground Boise	October 25, 2003	1	2:14	Boise, Idaho, United States	
Win	15–4–1	Joe Jordan	KO (punch)	Extreme Challenge 52	August 15, 2003	2	3:12	Rock Island, Illinois, United States	
Loss	14–4–1	Jason Maxwell	KO (strikes)	HOOKnSHOOT: Absolute Fighting Championships 3	May 24, 2003	1	4:54	Ft. Lauderdale, Florida, United States	
Loss	14–3–1	Duane Ludwig	KO (punch)	UCC 12: Adrenaline	January 25, 2003	1	1:03	Montreal, Quebec, Canada	For the UCC Lightweight Championship.
Win	14–2–1	Takehiro Murahama	Decision (split)	UFO: Legend	August 8, 2002	3	5:00	Tokyo, Japan	
Win	13–2–1	Rob Emerson	Decision (unanimous)	UW: Ultimate Wrestling	June 29, 2002	3	5:00	Minneapolis, Minnesota, United States	
Win	12–2–1	B.J. Penn	Decision (majority)	UFC 35	January 11, 2002	5	5:00	Uncasville, Connecticut, United States	Defended the UFC Lightweight Championship; Pulver was stripped of the title on March 23, 2002 due to a contract dispute.
Win	11–2–1	Dennis Hallman	Decision (unanimous)	UFC 33	September 28, 2001	5	5:00	Las Vegas, Nevada, United States	Defended the UFC Lightweight Championship.
Win	10–2–1	Caol Uno	Decision (unanimous)	UFC 30	February 23, 2001	5	5:00	Atlantic City, New Jersey, United States	Won the inaugural UFC Lightweight Championship. (Note: Prior to UFC 31 and the UFC's adoption of the Unified Rules, the 155 lb weight class was referred to as Bantamweight. This title was called the Bantamweight Championship at the time, then later renamed to the Lightweight Championship.)
Win	9–2–1	John Lewis	KO (punch)	UFC 28	November 17, 2000	1	0:11	Atlantic City, New Jersey, United States	
Win	8–2–1	Dave Gries	KO (punches)	Gladiators 10	October 14, 2000	N/A	N/A	Sioux City, Iowa, United States	
Loss	7–2–1	Din Thomas	Submission (heel hook)	WEF: New Blood Conflict	August 26, 2000	2	0:33	United States	
Win	7–1–1	João Roque	Decision (unanimous)	UFC 26	June 9, 2000	3	15:00	Cedar Rapids, Iowa, United States	
Win	6–1–1	Eric Hibler	KO (knees and punches)	WEF 9: World Class	May 13, 2000	1	1:54	Evansville, Indiana, United States	
Win	5–1–1	David Velasquez	TKO (strikes)	UFC 24	March 10, 2000	2	2:41	Lake Charles, Louisiana, United States	
Win	4–1–1	Phil Johns	KO (punch)	WEF 8: Goin' Platinum	January 15, 2000	1	0:33	Rome, Georgia, United States	
Draw	3–1–1	Alfonso Alcarez	Draw	UFC 22	September 24, 1999	2	5:00	Lake Charles, Louisiana, United States	
Win	3–1	Joe Stevenson	KO (punches)	Bas Rutten Invitational 3	June 1, 1999	1	0:38	Littleton, Colorado, United States	
Win	2–1	Ray Morales	Submission (guillotine choke)	Bas Rutten Invitational 3	June 1, 1999	1	0:51	Littleton, Colorado, United States	
Loss	1–1	David Harris	Submission (toe hold)	Bas Rutten Invitational 2	April 24, 1999	1	11:57	Littleton, Colorado, United States	
Win	1–0	Curtis Hill	TKO (towel)	Bas Rutten Invitational 2	April 24, 1999	1	3:00	Littleton, Colorado, United States	

== Kickboxing record ==
1 Wins (1 (T)KO's), 0 Losses, 0 Draws
Date	Result	Record	Opponent	Event	Method	Round	Time
2004-09-19	Win	1–0	(China) Dai Chang Liang	Shoot Boxing World Tournament 2004, Yokohama, Japan	TKO (referee stoppage)	1	2:58

== Professional boxing record ==
4 Wins (3 knockouts, 1 decisions), 0 Losses
Res.	Record	Opponent	Type	Rd., Time	Date	Location	Notes
Win	4–0	(United States) Jeff Hinds	KO	3, 0:13	October 22, 2004	Rosemont, Illinois, United States	Welterweight
Win	3–0	(United States) Leonard Lewis	TKO	1, 0:41	August 27, 2004	Rosemont, Illinois, United States	Light Middleweight
Win	2–0	(United States) Steve Vincent	Split decision	4	June 15, 2004	Elk Grove Village, Illinois, United States	Light Middleweight
Win	1–0	(United States) Matt Bauler	TKO	1, 0:32	February 28, 2004	Marshalltown, Iowa, United States	Middleweight

== Works ==
- Pulver, Jens and Krauss, Erich (2003) Little Evil, One Ultimate Fighter's Rise to the Top, ECW Press

== See also ==
- List of male mixed martial artists
- List of mixed martial artists with professional boxing records

New championship	1st UFC Lightweight Champion; February 23, 2001 – March 23, 2002	Vacant Pulver left UFC Title next held by Sean Sherk
