= UFC 26 =

UFC mixed martial arts event in 2000

UFC 26: Ultimate Field of Dreams
- The poster for UFC 26: Ultimate Field of Dreams
- Promotion: Ultimate Fighting Championship
- Date: June 9, 2000
- Venue: Five Seasons Events Center
- City: Cedar Rapids, Iowa

Event chronology
UFC 25: Ultimate Japan 3	UFC 26: Ultimate Field of Dreams	UFC 27: Ultimate Bad Boyz

UFC 26: Ultimate Field of Dreams was a mixed martial arts event held by the Ultimate Fighting Championship on June 9, 2000, in Cedar Rapids, Iowa.

== History ==
The main card featured Welterweight Champion Pat Miletich defending his title against John Alessio, and Heavyweight Champion Kevin Randleman defending his title against Pedro Rizzo. The Heavyweight Championship bout was first scheduled to take place at UFC 24, but was rescheduled due to a backstage accident involving Kevin Randleman, who slipped and fell on the concrete floor, sustaining a concussion.

A bantamweight division was added at UFC 26 for fighters under 155 pounds; Jens Pulver defeated Joao Roque in the first ever UFC bantamweight bout. Lightweight was now 155-169.9 pounds, Middleweight 170-199.9 pounds, and Heavyweight 200+ pounds. This was the fourth event to feature now-regular referee, Mario Yamasaki in addition to "Big" John McCarthy.

UFC 26 featured the second appearance of Matt Hughes in the UFC, who would go on to dominate the welterweight division. The event also marked the second UFC appearance of British fighter Ian Freeman, whose preliminary bout was shown on the live pay per view broadcast.

UFC 26 was the fourth straight UFC event to have never received a home video or DVD release in the United States, as the UFC's parent company SEG was incurring financial difficulties, and would eventually sell the company to Zuffa just six months later. Zuffa eventually released UFC 26 on DVD as part of an anthology collection of UFC 21-30.

== Results ==
Main Card
Weight class				Method	Round	Time	Notes
Heavyweight	Kevin Randleman (c)	def.	Pedro Rizzo	Decision (unanimous)	5	5:00	(Note: For the UFC Heavyweight Championship.)
Middleweight	Tyrone Roberts	def.	David Dodd	Decision (unanimous)	3	5:00
Welterweight	Pat Miletich (c)	def.	John Alessio	Submission (armbar)	2	1:43	(Note: For the UFC Welterweight Championship.)
Middleweight	Amaury Bitetti	def.	Alex Andrade	Disqualification (kicking with shoes)	2	0:43	(Note: UFC rules banned kicking while wearing shoes. Andrade, wearing wrestling shoes, kicked Bitetti three times. Andrade was deducted 2 points in the first round. Andrade was disqualified by referee Big John McCarthy.)
Lightweight	Matt Hughes	def.	Marcelo Aguiar	TKO (doctor stoppage)	1	4:34
Bantamweight	Jens Pulver	def.	Joao Roque	Decision (unanimous)	3	5:00
Preliminary Card
Heavyweight	Ian Freeman	def.	Nate Schroeder	TKO (Submission to punches)	2	2:13
Lightweight	Shonie Carter	def.	Adrian Serrano	Decision (unanimous)	2	5:00

== Encyclopedia awards ==
Pat Miletich was honored in the October 2011 book titled UFC Encyclopedia.

- Submission of the Night: Pat Miletich

== See also ==
- Ultimate Fighting Championship
- List of UFC champions
- List of UFC events
- 2000 in UFC
