= Lance Gibson =

Canadian mixed martial arts fighter

- Born: November 20, 1970 (age 55); Toronto, Ontario, Canada
- Other names: Fearless
- Height: 5 ft 9 in (1.75 m)
- Weight: 185 lb (84 kg; 13.2 st)
- Division: Middleweight
- Fighting out of: Port Moody, British Columbia
- Team: Gibson Kickboxing & Pankration

Mixed martial arts record
- Total: 9
- Wins: 4
- By knockout: 1
- By submission: 1
- By decision: 2
- Losses: 5
- By knockout: 2
- By submission: 2
- By decision: 1

Other information
- Mixed martial arts record from Sherdog

Lance "Fearless" Gibson (born November 20, 1970, in Toronto, Ontario) is a Canadian retired mixed martial artist. Having formally competed in the Middleweight division, he is widely considered to be one of Canada's mixed martial arts pioneers and was a finalist at the Superbrawl 4 tournament. He competed in organizations such as UFC, Shooto and Superbrawl.

== MMA career ==
Gibson started his career at "SB 4 - SuperBrawl 4". After defeating Peter Matautia at first round, he lost to Bob Gilstrap in final. Gibson made UFC his debut at UFC 24 and won Jermaine Andre with brutal knockout. His knockout was included in many knockout compilations later. He lost his second fight at UFC 29 to Evan Tanner by technical knockout.

== Grappling ==
Gibson took part at 1998 ADCC World Championships. He beat spanish grappler Jose Beltran at first round by decision but loss to Ricardo Alves in quarter final.

== Acting ==
Gibson started his acting career at 1995. He starred more than 10 TV series and movies. He is well known as Spike in X-Men: The Last Stand (2006).

== After retirement ==
Gibson opened his own MMA gym in Port Moody, British Columbia, Canada. He worked as coach at his own gym.

== Personal life ==
Gibson is married to former Bellator Women's Featherweight Champion Julia Budd. Gibson is also the father of current UFC lightweight fighter Lance Gibson, Jr.

== Career accomplishments ==
=== Mixed martial arts ===
- Ultimate Fighting Championship
  - UFC Encyclopedia Awards
    - Knockout of the Night (One time) vs. Jermaine Andre

== Mixed martial arts record ==
Professional record breakdown
9 matches	4 wins	5 losses
By knockout	1	3
By submission	1	1
By decision	2	1

Res.	Record	Opponent	Method	Event	Date	Round	Time	Location	Notes
Loss	4–5	Masanori Suda	Decision (unanimous)	Shooto: Treasure Hunt 1	January 12, 2002	3	5:00	Tokyo, Japan	
Loss	4–4	Evan Tanner	TKO (punches)	UFC 29	December 16, 2000	1	4:48	Tokyo, Japan	
Win	4–3	Masanori Suda	Decision (majority)	Shooto - R.E.A.D. 6	July 16, 2000	3	5:00	Tokyo, Japan	
Win	3–3	Jermaine Andre	KO (knee)	UFC 24	March 10, 2000	3	3:35	Louisiana, United States	
Win	2–3	Akihiro Gono	Decision (majority)	SB 13 - SuperBrawl 13	September 7, 1999	3	5:00	Hawaii, United States	
Loss	1–3	Rocky Batastini	KO (punch)	SB 10 - SuperBrawl 10	November 20, 1998	1	0:09	Guam	
Loss	1–2	Dan Severn	Submission (keylock)	SB 5 - SuperBrawl 5	August 23, 1997	1	26:22	Guam	
Win	1–1	Peter Matautia	Submission (rear naked choke)	SB 4 - SuperBrawl 4	April 9, 1997	1	1:33	Hawaii, United States	
Loss	0–1	Bob Gilstrap	TKO (punches)	SB 4 - SuperBrawl 4	April 9, 1997	1	4:53	Hawaii, United States	

== Submission grappling record ==
? Matches, ? Wins, ? Losses, ? Draws
Result	Rec.	Opponent	Method	Event	Date	Location
Loss	1–1–0	(Brazil) Ricardo Alves	Decision · Points	1998 ADCC World Championships	March 20, 1998	Abu Dhabi, United Arab Emirates
Win	1–0–0	(Spain) Jose Beltran	Decision · Points	1998 ADCC World Championships	March 20, 1998	Abu Dhabi, United Arab Emirates

== As an actor ==
- Hung faan aau (1995) - Tony's Gang Member
- University Hospital (1995, TV Series) - Rocky
- Jack Reed: One of Our Own (1995, TV Movie) - Manny Campton
- The Sentinel (1996, TV Series) - Frank
- Viper (1997, TV Series) - Bouncer
- The Crow: Stairway to Heaven (1999, TV Series) - Batboy
- Sweetwater (1999, TV Movie) - Security Guard
- Romeo Must Die (2000) - Doorman
- Seven Days (2000, TV Series) - Fearless
- Ladies and the Champ (2001, TV Series) - Dannybrook Brooks
- Dark Angel (2001-2002, TV Series) - Man on the Street #3 / Half Dead
- Jeremiah (2003, TV Series) - Enforcer
- Jake 2.0 (2003, TV Series) - Burns
- X-Men: The Last Stand (2006) - Spike
- Stargate SG-1 (1997-2006) - Harem Guard
- Children of the Gods (2009) - Harem Guard
- True Justice (2011) - Sparring Partner
- Arrow (TV series) (2013-2014) - Prisoner Truck Driver
- Undercover Wife tv movie (2016) - Second Thug
- The Smashing Machine (2025 film) (2025) - UFC Contender
