= Dennis Hallman =

American mixed martial artist

- Born: December 2, 1975 (age 50); Olympia, Washington, U.S.
- Other names: Superman
- Height: 5 ft 9 in (1.75 m)
- Weight: 181 lb (82 kg; 12 st 13 lb)
- Division: Middleweight; Welterweight; Lightweight
- Reach: 71 in (180 cm)
- Stance: Orthodox
- Fighting out of: Yelm, Washington, United States
- Team: Victory Athletics
- Rank: 2nd degree black belt in Brazilian jiu-jitsu under Fabiano Scherner
- Years active: 1996––2015

Professional boxing record
- Total: 4
- Wins: 1
- Losses: 3
- By knockout: 2

Mixed martial arts record
- Total: 76
- Wins: 53
- By knockout: 4
- By submission: 41
- By decision: 7
- By disqualification: 1
- Losses: 20
- By knockout: 11
- By decision: 9
- Draws: 2
- No contests: 1

Other information
- Mixed martial arts record from Sherdog

Dennis Hallman (born December 2, 1975) is an American former professional mixed martial artist who competed from 1996 to 2015. A veteran of 75 fights, he competed in various promotions including the UFC, Strikeforce, IFL, the World Series of Fighting, Titan FC, Shooto, and King of the Cage. He is most notable for infamously sporting a blue speedo to the octagon in his UFC fight against Brian Ebersole. He is also notable for being the only fighter other than George St. Pierre and B.J. Penn to defeat former UFC Welterweight Champion Matt Hughes twice.

== Background ==
Hallman was born in Olympia, Washington, and began training when he was eight years old. He was on the Wrestling team at Yelm High School and won the 135-pound state championship in his senior year. Hallman had planned to continue his career at a community college, but broke his leg during the pre-season training, and had to be sidelined for the entire season. A former high school classmate was sending in video tapes to Battlecade and invited Hallman to fight him because Hallman was a well-known wrestler. Hallman won the fight by a guillotine choke, and his opponent's praise of Hallman's potential encouraged Hallman to pursue a career in MMA. Hallman had an exhibition match three weeks later against a Japanese fighter who was training with Matt Hume, which Hallman also won.

== MMA career ==
=== Ultimate Fighting Championship ===
Two of Hallman's biggest achievements are his wins (both by submission in a combined 38 seconds) over UFC Hall of Famer and former welterweight champion Matt Hughes. Their first fight was in 1998 at Extreme Challenge 21, the second in December 2000 at UFC 29: Defense of the Belts.

==== Title shot ====
After his second victory over Matt Hughes, Hallman moved down in weight and fought Hughes' teammate Jens Pulver for the lightweight UFC championship in September 2001. Both Hallman and Pulver wrestled at the high school level in Washington. Hallman claimed to know Pulver since high school and expressed dislike toward the fighter. Although Pulver denied knowing Hallman personally, he knew of Hallman through their state champion wrestling careers (at different weight classes).

During the fight Hallman attempted an armbar on Pulver (the same move he used to defeat Hughes in their second meeting), but Pulver countered the technique and followed with a left hook that landed flush on Hallman's chin, staggering him. Hallman was not able to recover completely from the blow, fighting very passively for the remainder of the bout (which eventually resulted in a unanimous decision loss). Hallman later stated in interviews that he simply wanted to survive the fight after receiving the blow.

=== Return to the UFC ===
Hallman made his return to the UFC against John Howard on December 5, 2009, at The Ultimate Fighter 10 Finale. After controlling Howard on the ground for most of the bout, Hallman lost via KO at 4:55 of the third round.

Hallman then announced that he would try and move down to lightweight.

Hallman then signed to face Ben Saunders in a welterweight bout on August 7, 2010, at UFC 117. Hallman defeated Saunders via unanimous decision.

Hallman faced returning UFC veteran Karo Parisyan on November 20, 2010, at UFC 123. Hallman defeated Parisyan via TKO due to strikes in the first round after he dropped Parisyan with a stiff right, then finished with hammerfists.

Hallman was expected to face TJ Waldburger on March 26, 2011, at UFC Fight Night 24. However, Hallman was forced out of the bout with a knee injury and replaced by Johny Hendricks.

On January 15, 2011, it was announced that Hallman has extended his UFC contract for four additional UFC fights.

Hallman faced Brian Ebersole on August 6, 2011, at UFC 133. He lost the fight via TKO in the first round. Wearing particularly skimpy blue shorts during the fight, in a ground battle Hallman's left testicle was briefly exposed, eliciting chants of "Put some clothes on" from the crowd and call for regulation of fighter shorts from UFC President Dana White. Hallman has since stated that he wore the shorts as a result of losing a bet.

Hallman next faced John Makdessi on December 10, 2011, at UFC 140. In the lead up to the bout, Hallman missed the 156 pound weight limit by weighing in at 158.5, resulting in a fine and the fight being changed to a catchweight bout. Hallman defeated Makdessi via submission in the first round.

Hallman was expected to face Tony Ferguson on May 5, 2012, at UFC on Fox 3. However, Hallman was forced out of the bout with an injury and replaced by Thiago Tavares.

Hallman was expected to face Thiago Tavares on September 1, 2012, at UFC 151. However, after UFC 151 was cancelled, Hallman/Tavares was rescheduled to take place on October 5, 2012, at UFC on FX 5. After the weigh-ins of UFC on FX 5 Hallman was 7 lbs. over the 156 lb. weight limit and Tavares said if Hallman could make 3 lbs. over the weight limit he would agree to fight him but Hallman could not and the bout was scrapped from the card. Hallman said he missed weight because of personal issues at home and both him and Tavares were paid their show money. Hallman was released from the UFC for missing weight twice in a row.

=== World Series Of Fighting ===
Hallman fought Jon Fitch on July 5, 2014, at World Series of Fighting 11: Gaethje vs. Newell. He lost the fight via unanimous decision.

=== ProFC ===
Hallman faced with Russian Hand-to-hand champion and former Bellator MMA fighter Michail Tsarev on November 1, 2014. He lost the fight via TKO.

=== League S-70 ===
Hallman faced to Mikhail Kolobegov on August 29, 2015, at League S-70: Russia vs. World. He lost the fight via TKO (punches).

== Boxing career ==
Hallman made his professional boxing debut on August 23, 2014, in Tacoma, Washington, at the Emerald Queen Casino on the Battle at the Boat 97 card. As of May 2020, his professional boxing record stands at 1–3.

== Personal life ==
Hallman has three sons, Ryley, Richie, and Jayden and a daughter named Kylar, who was born in December 2008.

He has Celiac Disease, an autoimmune digestive reaction to gluten, which hindered his ability to recover properly from physical activities such as training and fighting.

=== Mixed martial arts ===
- Ultimate Fighting Championship
  - UFC Encyclopedia Awards
    - Submission of the Night (One time) vs. Matt Hughes

== Mixed martial arts record ==
Professional record breakdown
| 76 matches | 53 wins | 20 losses |
| By knockout | 4 | 11 |
| By submission | 41 | 0 |
| By decision | 7 | 9 |
| By disqualification | 1 | 0 |
| Draws | 2 | |
| No contests | 1 | |

| Res. | Record | Opponent | Method | Event | Date | Round | Time | Location | Notes |
|---|---|---|---|---|---|---|---|---|---|
| Loss | 53–20–2 (1) | Will Noland | KO (punches) | KOTC: Untamed | November 19, 2015 | 1 | 2:38 | Worley, Idaho, United States | Catchweight (193 lbs) bout. |
| Loss | 53–19–2 (1) | Mikhail Kolobegov | TKO (punches) | League S-70: Russia vs. World | August 29, 2015 | 1 | 1:19 | Sochi, Russia | |
| Loss | 53–18–2 (1) | Albert Tadevosyan | TKO (punches) | MMA Summer Showdown 2 | July 18, 2015 | 1 | N/A | Tulalip, Washington, United States | Welterweight bout. |
| Loss | 53–17–2 (1) | Yang Dongi | TKO (punches) | Top FC 6: Unbreakable Dream | April 5, 2015 | 1 | 3:25 | Seoul, South Korea | Catchweight (198 lbs) bout. |
| Loss | 53–16–2 (1) | Michail Tsarev | TKO (punches) | ProFC 56: Baltic Challenge 6 | November 1, 2014 | 1 | 2:45 | Kaliningrad, Russia | |
| Loss | 53–15–2 (1) | Jon Fitch | Decision (unanimous) | WSOF 11 | July 5, 2014 | 3 | 5:00 | Daytona Beach, Florida, United States | |
| Win | 53–14–2 (1) | Aleksey Shapovalov | Submission (rear-naked choke) | Union of Veterans of Sport: Cup of Champions | December 21, 2013 | 2 | 1:07 | Novosibirsk, Russia | Return to Middleweight. |
| Win | 52–14–2 (1) | Dan Hornbuckle | Decision (majority) | Titan FC 26 | August 30, 2013 | 3 | 5:00 | Kansas City, Missouri, United States | Welterweight bout. |
| Win | 51–14–2 (1) | John Makdessi | Submission (rear-naked choke) | UFC 140 | December 10, 2011 | 1 | 2:58 | Toronto, Ontario, Canada | Catchweight (158 lbs) bout; Hallman missed weight. |
| Loss | 50–14–2 (1) | Brian Ebersole | TKO (elbows) | UFC 133 | August 6, 2011 | 1 | 4:28 | Philadelphia, Pennsylvania, United States | |
| Win | 50–13–2 (1) | Karo Parisyan | TKO (punches) | UFC 123 | November 20, 2010 | 1 | 1:47 | Auburn Hills, Michigan, United States | |
| Win | 49–13–2 (1) | Ben Saunders | Decision (unanimous) | UFC 117 | August 7, 2010 | 3 | 5:00 | Oakland, California, United States | |
| Loss | 48–13–2 (1) | John Howard | KO (punches) | The Ultimate Fighter: Heavyweights Finale | December 5, 2009 | 3 | 4:55 | Las Vegas, Nevada, United States | Return to Welterweight. |
| Win | 48–12–2 (1) | Justin Davis | Submission (rear-naked choke) | Strikeforce Challengers: Villasenor vs. Cyborg | June 19, 2009 | 1 | 0:20 | Kent, Washington, United States | Catchweight (200 lbs) bout. |
| Win | 47–12–2 (1) | Danny Ruiz | Submission (rear-naked choke) | SRP: March Badness | March 21, 2009 | 1 | 1:50 | Pensacola, Florida, United States | |
| Win | 46–12–2 (1) | Jeremiah Metcalf | Submission (heel hook) | Strikeforce: Four Men Enter, One Man Survives | November 16, 2007 | 1 | 1:39 | San Jose, California, United States | Tested positive for banned substance. |
| Win | 45–12–2 (1) | Dave Knight | Submission (rear-naked choke) | USA MMA: Rumble on the River 4 | July 27, 2007 | 1 | N/A | Fairbanks, Alaska, United States | |
| Win | 44–12–2 (1) | Jeff Quinlan | Decision (majority) | IFL: Gracie vs. Miletich | September 23, 2006 | 3 | 4:00 | Moline, Illinois, United States | |
| Loss | 43–12–2 (1) | Ryan McGivern | Decision (unanimous) | IFL: Championship 2006 | June 3, 2006 | 3 | 4:00 | Atlantic City, New Jersey, United States | |
| Win | 43–11–2 (1) | Delson Heleno | DQ (illegal kick) | IFL: Legends Championship 2006 | April 29, 2006 | 1 | 3:59 | Atlantic City, New Jersey, United States | Hallman unable to continue after illegal soccer kick. |
| Win | 42–11–2 (1) | Ray Perales | Submission (rear-naked choke) | Valor Fighting: Showdown at Cache Creek | February 3, 2006 | 1 | 0:33 | Brooks, California, United States | |
| Loss | 41–11–2 (1) | Jorge Rivera | Decision (unanimous) | UFC 55 | October 7, 2005 | 3 | 5:00 | Uncasville, Connecticut, United States | |
| Win | 41–10–2 (1) | Nick Tyree | Submission (guillotine choke) | Valor Fighting: Medford Mayhem | July 16, 2005 | 1 | 2:27 | Medford, Oregon, United States | |
| Loss | 40–10–2 (1) | Ansar Chalangov | TKO (corner stoppage) | Euphoria: USA vs. Russia | May 14, 2005 | 2 | 5:00 | Atlantic City, New Jersey, United States | Bout ended after second round due to Hallman's fatigue. |
| Win | 40–9–2 (1) | Cedric Marks | Submission (triangle choke) | XFC: Dome of Destruction 2 | April 30, 2005 | 1 | 2:48 | Tacoma, Washington, United States | |
| Win | 39–9–2 (1) | Rory Singer | Submission (rear-naked choke) | AFC 11: Absolute Fighting Championships 11 | February 12, 2005 | 1 | 1:19 | Fort Lauderdale, Florida, United States | Return to Middleweight; won the vacant AFC Middleweight Championship. |
| Win | 38–9–2 (1) | Ross Ebañez | Submission (rear-naked choke) | ROTR 6: Rumble on the Rock 6 | November 20, 2004 | 1 | 1:13 | Honolulu, Hawaii, United States | |
| Win | 37–9–2 (1) | Landon Showalter | Submission (triangle choke) | SF 7: Frightnight | October 23, 2004 | 1 | 2:04 | Gresham, Oregon, United States | |
| Win | 36–9–2 (1) | Mike Seal | Submission (rear-naked choke) | SF 6: Battleground in Reno | September 23, 2004 | 1 | 0:50 | Reno, Nevada, United States | |
| Loss | 35–9–2 (1) | Frank Trigg | TKO (punches) | UFC 48 | June 19, 2004 | 1 | 4:15 | Las Vegas, Nevada, United States | |
| Win | 35–8–2 (1) | Rob Mendez | Submission (rear-naked choke) | USA MMA: Extreme Cage Combat | March 6, 2004 | 1 | 0:56 | Shelton, Washington, United States | |
| Win | 34–8–2 (1) | Jason Stumpf | Submission (triangle choke) | URC 7: Ultimate Ring Challenge 7 | February 14, 2004 | 1 | 2:43 | Yelm, Washington, United States | |
| Draw | 33–8–2 (1) | J.T. Taylor | Draw | DB 9: DesertBrawl 9 | November 8, 2003 | 3 | 5:00 | Bend, Oregon, United States | |
| Win | 33–8–1 (1) | Ray Cooper | Submission (guillotine choke) | Rumble on the Rock 4 | October 10, 2003 | 1 | 0:43 | Honolulu, Hawaii, United States | |
| Loss | 32–8–1 (1) | Drew Fickett | Decision (split) | KOTC 28: More Punishment | August 16, 2003 | 3 | 5:00 | Reno, Nevada, United States | Lightweight bout. |
| Win | 32–7–1 (1) | Brandon Olsen | Submission (armbar) | AOW: Art of War 2 | June 21, 2003 | 1 | N/A | Kalispell, Montana, United States | |
| Win | 31–7–1 (1) | Chris Irvine | Submission (rear-naked choke) | URC 5: Ultimate Ring Challenge 5 | May 24, 2003 | 1 | 1:43 | Lacey, Washington, United States | |
| Win | 30–7–1 (1) | Lee Henderson | TKO (punches) | XRW: Xtreme Ring Wars 2 | May 10, 2003 | 1 | 0:37 | Pasco, Washington, United States | |
| Win | 29–7–1 (1) | Vince Guzman | Submission (rear-naked choke) | XRW: Xtreme Ring Wars 1 | March 15, 2003 | 1 | 3:28 | Wenatchee, Washington, United States | |
| Draw | 28–7–1 (1) | Ronald Jhun | Draw | KOTC 19: Street Fighter | December 7, 2002 | 2 | 5:00 | San Jacinto, California, United States | |
| Loss | 28–7 (1) | Frank Trigg | TKO (punches) | WFA 3: Level 3 | November 23, 2002 | 1 | 3:50 | Las Vegas, Nevada, United States | For the WFA Welterweight Championship. |
| Win | 28–6 (1) | Betiss Mansouri | Submission (triangle choke) | KOTC 18: Sudden Impact | November 1, 2002 | 1 | 3:39 | Reno, Nevada, United States | Return to Welterweight. |
| Win | 27–6 (1) | Adam Oliver | Submission (rear-naked choke) | UFCF: Rumble in Rochester | August 24, 2002 | 1 | 2:59 | Rochester, Washington, United States | |
| Win | 26–6 (1) | Gary Dobbins | Submission (rear-naked choke) | PPKA: Road to Victory | May 25, 2002 | 1 | 0:20 | Longview, Washington, United States | |
| Win | 25–6 (1) | Chris Silva | Submission (armbar) | URC 2: Ultimate Ring Challenge 2 | April 27, 2002 | 1 | 2:00 | Olympia, Washington, United States | |
| NC | 24–6 (1) | Denis Kang | No Contest | WFF 1: World Freestyle Fighting 1 | April 13, 2002 | 2 | 3:15 | Kelowna, British Columbia, Canada | Hallman unable to continue after illegal up-kick. |
| Win | 24–6 | Buck Greer | Decision (split) | UA 2: The Gathering | March 16, 2002 | 3 | 5:00 | Cabazon, California, United States | |
| Win | 23–6 | Mathias Hughes | Submission (rear-naked choke) | MFC 3: Canadian Pride | March 3, 2002 | 1 | 1:05 | Grande Prairie, Alberta | |
| Loss | 22–6 | Amaury Bitetti | Decision (split) | Shogun 1: Shogun 1 | December 15, 2001 | 3 | 5:00 | Honolulu, Hawaii, United States | Return to Middleweight. |
| Loss | 22–5 | Jens Pulver | Decision (unanimous) | UFC 33 | September 28, 2001 | 5 | 5:00 | Las Vegas, Nevada, United States | For the UFC Lightweight Championship. |
| Win | 22–4 | Earl Thompson | Submission (rear-naked choke) | PPKA: Muckelshoot | August 15, 2001 | 1 | 0:12 | Auburn, Washington, United States | |
| Win | 21–4 | Dan Shenk | Submission (rear-naked choke) | AMC: Revenge of the Warriors | July 21, 2001 | 1 | N/A | Rochester, Washington, United States | |
| Win | 20–4 | Eric Dahlberg | KO (punch) | RITR 2: Rumble in the Ring 2 | April 28, 2001 | 1 | 0:12 | Auburn, Washington, United States | |
| Win | 19–4 | Brent Russell | Submission (americana) | AMC: Return of the Gladiators 3 | March 3, 2001 | 1 | N/A | Rochester, Washington, United States | |
| Win | 18–4 | Matt Hughes | Submission (armbar) | UFC 29 | December 16, 2000 | 1 | 0:20 | Tokyo, Japan | Welterweight bout. |
| Win | 17–4 | Jordon Klimp | Decision (unanimous) | UFCF: Tornado Challenge | September 16, 2000 | 3 | 3:00 | Yelm, Washington, United States | |
| Win | 16–4 | Jeff Sears | Submission (rear-naked choke) | PPKA: Wenatchee Rumble | August 1, 2000 | 1 | 2:15 | Wenatchee, Washington, United States | |
| Win | 15–4 | Murrey Sholtey | TKO (punches) | AMC: Return of the Gladiators 1 | July 29, 2000 | 1 | 3:30 | Rochester, Washington, United States | |
| Loss | 14–4 | Paul Rodriguez | KO (punch) | HOOKnSHOOT: Meltdown | June 10, 2000 | 3 | 0:18 | Evansville, Indiana, United States | |
| Loss | 14–3 | Caol Uno | Decision (unanimous) | Shooto: R.E.A.D. 3 | April 2, 2000 | 3 | 5:00 | Osaka, Japan | Lightweight debut. |
| Win | 14–2 | Danny Bennett | Technical Submission (armbar) | UFCF: Battle in Bellevue 2 | December 4, 1999 | 1 | 3:16 | Bellevue, Washington, United States | |
| Loss | 13–2 | Dave Menne | Decision (unanimous) | Shooto: 10th Anniversary Event | May 29, 1999 | 3 | 5:00 | Yokohama, Japan | |
| Win | 13–1 | Danny Bennett | Submission (americana) | UFCF: Battle in Bellevue 1 | April 24, 1999 | 1 | N/A | Bellevue, Washington, United States | |
| Loss | 12–1 | Mike McClure | Decision (unanimous) | EC 23: Extreme Challenge 23 | April 2, 1999 | 1 | 15:00 | Indianapolis, Indiana, United States | |
| Win | 12–0 | Gerrald Ballinger | Submission (armbar) | URC 1: Ultimate Ring Challenge 1 | March 1, 1999 | 1 | 1:11 | Wenatchee, Washington, United States | |
| Win | 11–0 | Matt Hughes | Technical Submission (guillotine choke) | Extreme Challenge 21 | October 17, 1998 | 1 | 0:17 | Hayward, Wisconsin, United States | |
| Win | 10–0 | Shannon Ritch | Submission (punches) | Extreme Challenge 21 | October 17, 1998 | 1 | 0:44 | Hayward, Wisconsin, United States | |
| Win | 9–0 | Allan Mollring | Submission (armbar) | Extreme Challenge 21 | October 17, 1998 | 1 | 2:52 | Hayward, Wisconsin, United States | |
| Win | 8–0 | Phil Johns | Submission (guillotine choke) | EC 20: Extreme Challenge 20 | August 22, 1998 | 1 | 3:47 | Davenport, Iowa, United States | |
| Win | 7–0 | Leigh Remedios | Submission (kimura) | UWC: Ultimate Warrior Challenge | August 2, 1998 | 1 | 9:45 | Vancouver, British Columbia, Canada | |
| Win | 6–0 | Ulan Moore | Submission (rear-naked choke) | UFCF: Night of Champions | March 14, 1998 | 1 | 1:21 | Washington | |
| Win | 5–0 | Sean Haley | Submission (bulldog choke) | EC 21: Extreme Challenge 21 | November 21, 1997 | 1 | 1:05 | Washington | |
| Win | 4–0 | Jose De La Cruz | Submission (americana) | TS: Tae Sho | September 12, 1997 | 1 | 3:28 | Tacoma, Washington, United States | |
| Win | 3–0 | Zack Gross | Decision (unanimous) | UFCF: Clash of the Titans | January 11, 1997 | 1 | 5:00 | Washington | |
| Win | 2–0 | Hiroki Noritsugi | Decision (unanimous) | UFCF: Ultimate Fighting 2 | May 18, 1996 | 1 | 5:00 | Kirkland, Washington, United States | |
| Win | 1–0 | Hiroki Noritsugi | Submission (guillotine choke) | UFCF: Ultimate Fighting 2 | May 18, 1996 | 1 | 0:20 | Kirkland, Washington, United States | |

== Professional boxing record ==
| 4 fights | 1 win | 3 losses |
|---|---|---|
| By knockout | 0 | 2 |
| By decision | 0 | 1 |
| By disqualification | 1 | 0 |

| No. | Result | Record | Opponent | Type | Round, time | Date | Location | Notes |
|---|---|---|---|---|---|---|---|---|
| 4 | Loss | 1–3 | (United States) Kadin Lecoure | TKO | 4 | October 13, 2018 | (United States) Coeur d’Alene Casino, Worley, Idaho, U.S. | |
| 3 | Loss | 1–2 | (New Zealand) Craig Thomson | TKO | 2 (8) | March 1, 2018 | (United States) Coeur d’Alene Casino, Worley, Idaho, U.S. | |
| 2 | Win | 1–1 | (United States) Justin Milani | DQ | 4 | September 6, 2014 | (United States) Silver Reef Casino, Ferndale, Washington, U.S. | |
| 1 | Loss | 0–1 | (United States) Frankie Orr | UD | 4 | Aug 23, 2014 | (United States) Emerald Queen Casino, Tacoma, Washington, U.S. | |
