= Alexandre Dantas =

Brazilian jiu-jitsu practitioner and mixed martial artist (born 1979)

- Born: Alexandre Dantas; 1 March 1979 (age 47); Rio de Janeiro, Brazil
- Other names: Café
- Height: 6 ft 1 in (1.85 m)
- Weight: 238 lb (108 kg; 17.0 st)
- Division: Heavyweight
- Fighting out of: Fort Lauderdale, Florida
- Team: Gracie Barra
- Rank: 5th degree black belt in Brazilian jiu-jitsu
- Years active: 2000–2003

Mixed martial arts record
- Total: 3
- Wins: 0
- Losses: 3
- By knockout: 3

Other information
- Mixed martial arts record from Sherdog

Alexandre Dantas (born 1 March 1979) is a Brazilian jiu-jitsu instructor and competitor. Dantas formerly fought mixed martial artist. He competed in the Heavyweight division. He lost his last fight at UFC 41 against Gan McGee on 28 February 2003. He is a three-time world champion in Brazilian jiu-jitsu, the 2002 champion in the open division Brazilian Championship, a five-time Rio de Janeiro jiu-jitsu champion, the 2007 champion of de ADCC trials in Brazil, the Brazilian teams champion at Gracie Barra team, three-time champion of Brazil X USA jiu-jitsu, three-time Pan-American jiu-jitsu champion, the 2000 USA Jiu-jitsu champion, five-time champion of the open division of Copa Café Jiu-jitsu in Miguel Pereira - Rio de Janeiro, among other championships.

Dantas has notable wins in Brazilian jiu-jitsu competition over Rodrigo "Comprido", Gabriel Gonzaga, Fabrício Werdum, "Marcelinho" Garcia, Demian Maia, Bruno Bastos, Fernando Augusto “Tererê”, Marcio "Corleta", and others.

== Mixed martial arts record ==
Professional record breakdown
3 matches	0 wins	3 losses
By knockout	0	3

Res.	Record	Opponent	Method	Event	Date	Round	Time	Location	Notes
Loss	0–3	Paulo Cesar Melo Jr.	TKO (corner stoppage)	EFC Marica 5 - Elite Fighting Championship 5	9 October 2016	1	5:00	Maricá, Rio de Janeiro, Brazil	
Loss	0–2	Gan McGee	TKO (strikes)	UFC 41	28 February 2003	1	4:49	Atlantic City, New Jersey, United States	
Loss	0–1	Yuki Kondo	TKO (strikes)	UFC 27	22 September 2000	3	2:28	New Orleans, United States	
