= Dave Menne =

American mixed martial arts fighter (born 1974)

- Born: David Jeremy Menne; July 29, 1974 (age 52); Minneapolis, Minnesota, U.S.
- Other names: The Warrior
- Height: 5 ft 10 in (1.78 m)
- Weight: 185 lb (84 kg; 13.2 st)
- Division: Heavyweight; Light Heavyweight; Middleweight; Welterweight
- Stance: Orthodox
- Fighting out of: Forest Lake, Minnesota, U.S.
- Team: Menne Combat Academy; Minnesota Martial Arts Academy
- Years active: 1997–2012

Mixed martial arts record
- Total: 64
- Wins: 45
- By knockout: 5
- By submission: 19
- By decision: 20
- Unknown: 1
- Losses: 17
- By knockout: 7
- By submission: 1
- By decision: 9
- Draws: 2

Other information
- Mixed martial arts record from Sherdog
- Last updated on: October 17, 2012

David Jeremy Menne (born July 29, 1974) is an American retired mixed martial artist. He was the first ever UFC Middleweight Champion and has also competed for Cage Rage, Bellator, Shooto, ADCC and RINGS.

== Background ==
Menne was born in Minneapolis, Minnesota and grew up in Forest Lake, Minnesota, attending Forest Lake Area High School where he excelled in wrestling. Menne continued wrestling at the collegiate level at the University of Iowa while studying philosophy. He found Muay Thai while in Santa Fe, New Mexico before returning to Minnesota to train at the Minnesota Martial Arts Academy in Shooto.

== Mixed martial arts career ==
=== Early career ===
Menne made his professional mixed martial arts debut in 1997 and compiled a record of 23-5-1 with notable wins over Dennis Hallman, Jutaro Nakao, Chris Lytle, and also fought to a draw against Shonie Carter. After Menne lost to Kiyoshi Tamura at the 1999 Rings: King of Kings tournament, he signed with the UFC.

=== UFC ===
Menne made his UFC debut at UFC 24 against Fabiano Iha on March 10, 2000 and won via decision. In his next fight, outside of the UFC, he defeated Jose Landi-Jons via majority decision to become the World Extreme Fighting Cruiserweight Superfight Champion. Menne then re-signed with the RINGS organization in Japan.

=== RINGS ===
Menne made his RINGS debut against Ryuki Ueyama and fought to a draw. He fought again at an event in Hawaii, a decision loss, before winning his next two fights for the organization against Wataru Sakata and Roberto Traven, respectively. On February 8, 2001 Menne competed in the Shidokan Jitsu - Warriors 1 Tournament and defeated future UFC Welterweight Champion Carlos Newton in the opening round, before later going on to win the tournament. In his last appearance for RINGS, Menne was defeated by Hiromitsu Kanehara via TKO.

=== Return to UFC ===
Menne returned to the UFC at UFC 33 to face Gil Castillo for the first UFC Middleweight Championship and won via unanimous decision. In his first title defense at UFC 35, Menne was defeated by Murilo Bustamante via TKO. In his next fight for the UFC, Menne faced Phil Baroni at UFC 39 and was knocked out in only 18 seconds.

After UFC 39, Menne went 9-4 in his next 13 fights before returning to the UFC at UFC Ultimate Fight Night 5 on June 28, 2006 against Josh Koscheck and lost via unanimous decision. Menne then fought at UFC Fight Night 7 on December 13, 2006 against Luigi Fioravanti and lost via TKO.

=== Bellator ===
Two years after his last UFC appearance, Menne picked up a win before being signed by Bellator Fighting Championships. He made his debut for the organization at Bellator IV against Norman Paraisy in the quarterfinals of the Bellator Season One Welterweight Tournament on April 17, 2009. Though the underdog coming into the fight, Menne won via third round rear naked choke submission. Less than a month later, Menne faced Omar de la Cruz at Bellator 7 on May 15, 2009. Menne lost via TKO. He left the organization in late 2009.

=== Post-Bellator ===
In his first fight since being released from Bellator, Menne fought and defeated Adrian Miles at XKL Evolution 2 on April 24, 2010. He then defeated Eric Davila via guillotine choke at UWF 1 on November 26, 2011. Menne's most recent fight is a rematch with mixed martial arts legend Murilo Bustamante, the man he lost his UFC Championship to. He lost by unanimous decision.

== Championships and accomplishments ==
- Ultimate Fighting Championship
  - UFC Middleweight Championship (One time; first)
- HOOKnSHOOT
  - HOOKnSHOOT Lightweight Tournament Champion
  - HOOKnSHOOT Lightweight Championship (One time; first)
- World Extreme Fighting
  - WEF Cruiserweight Superfight Championship
- Shidokan Jitsu Warriors War 1
  - Tournament Winner

== Mixed martial arts record ==
Professional record breakdown
64 matches	45 wins	17 losses
By knockout	6	7
By submission	19	1
By decision	20	9
Draws	2	

Res.	Record	Opponent	Method	Event	Date	Round	Time	Location	Notes
Loss	45–17–2	Murilo Bustamante	Decision (unanimous)	Amazon Forest Combat 2	March 31, 2012	3	5:00	Manaus, Amazonas, Brazil	Middleweight bout.
Win	45–16–2	Eric Davila	Submission (guillotine choke)	UWF 1: Huerta vs. War Machine	November 26, 2011	1	1:35	Pharr, Texas, United States	
Win	44–16–2	Adrian Miles	Decision (unanimous)	XKL Evolution 2	April 24, 2010	3	5:00	Minneapolis, Minnesota, United States	
Loss	43–16–2	Omar de la Cruz	TKO (punches)	Bellator 7	May 15, 2009	1	3:19	Chicago, Illinois, United States	Welterweight Semifinal Tournament Bout.
Win	43–15–2	Norman Paraisy	Submission (rear-naked choke)	Bellator IV	April 17, 2009	3	2:39	Norman, Oklahoma, United States	Welterweight Quarterfinal Tournament Bout.
Win	42–15–2	Travis McCollough	TKO (punches)	Brutaal: Fight Club	May 2, 2008	1	2:34	Maplewood, Minnesota, United States	
Loss	41–15–2	Luigi Fioravanti	TKO (punches)	UFC Fight Night: Sanchez vs. Riggs	December 13, 2006	1	4:44	San Diego, California, United States	
Loss	41–14–2	Josh Koscheck	Decision (unanimous)	UFC Fight Night 5	June 28, 2006	3	5:00	Las Vegas, Nevada, United States	
Win	41–13–2	Alex Reid	Decision (unanimous)	Cage Rage 16	April 22, 2006	3	5:00	London, England	Middleweight bout.
Loss	40–13–2	Jake Shields	Decision (unanimous)	Rumble on the Rock 8	January 20, 2006	3	5:00	Honolulu, Hawaii, United States	Return to Welterweight; Welterweight Tournament Opening Round.
Loss	40–12–2	Ed Herman	TKO (corner stoppage)	EC 63: Extreme Challenge 63	July 23, 2005	1	5:00	Hayward, Wisconsin, United States	
Win	40–11–2	Jerry Spiegel	Submission (guillotine choke)	EC 62: Extreme Challenge 62	June 18, 2005	1	3:17	Medina, Minnesota, United States	
Win	39–11–2	Trevor Garrett	Decision (split)	EC 60: Extreme Challenge 60	November 12, 2004	3	5:00	Medina, Minnesota, United States	
Win	38–11–2	Eddie Sanchez	Submission (rear naked choke)	EC 59: Extreme Challenge 59	September 24, 2004	1	0:53	Medina, Minnesota, United States	
Win	37–11–2	Todd Carney	Decision (unanimous)	EC 58: Extreme Challenge 58	June 11, 2004	3	5:00	Medina, Minnesota, United States	
Win	36–11–2	Leo Sylvest	Submission (toe hold)	EC 56: Extreme Challenge 56	March 26, 2004	1	2:06	Medina, Minnesota, United States	
Loss	35–11–2	Falaniko Vitale	Decision (unanimous)	SB 33: SuperBrawl 33	February 7, 2004	3	5:00	Honolulu, Hawaii, United States	
Win	35–10–2	Sam Cleveland	TKO (punches)	EC: Best of the Best 2: Day Event	August 2, 2003	1	N/A	Anoka, Minnesota, United States	
Loss	34–10–2	Hayato Sakurai	TKO (cut)	DEEP: 10th Impact	June 25, 2003	2	2:02	Tokyo, Japan	
Win	34–9–2	Dennis Reed	TKO	EC: Extreme Combat	June 14, 2003	1	N/A	Ramsey, Minnesota, United States	
Win	33–9–2	Todd Carney	Submission (guillotine choke)	ICC 2: Rebellion	April 18, 2003	1	1:05	Minneapolis, Minnesota, United States	
Loss	32–9–2	Phil Baroni	KO (strikes)	UFC 39	September 27, 2002	1	0:18	Uncasville, Connecticut, United States	
Win	32–8–2	Robert Ferguson	TKO (retirement)	UAGF 2: Ultimate Cage Fighting 2	July 30, 2002	2	5:00	Hollywood, California, United States	
Loss	31–8–2	Murilo Bustamante	TKO (punches)	UFC 35	January 11, 2002	2	0:44	Uncasville, Connecticut, United States	Lost the UFC Middleweight Championship.
Win	31–7–2	Gil Castillo	Decision (unanimous)	UFC 33	September 28, 2001	5	5:00	Las Vegas, Nevada, United States	Won the inaugural UFC Middleweight Championship.
Loss	30–7–2	Hiromitsu Kanehara	TKO (punches)	RINGS: King of Kings 2000 Final	February 24, 2001	3	3:24	Tokyo, Japan	Heavyweight bout
Win	30–6–2	Karimula Barkalaev	Decision (unanimous)	Shidokan Jitsu: Warriors War 1	February 8, 2001	1	10:00	Kuwait	Won the Shidokan Jitsu Warriors War 1 Tournament.
Win	29–6–2	Shamir Maromegob	Decision (unanimous)	Shidokan Jitsu: Warriors War 1	February 8, 2001	1	10:00	Kuwait	
Win	28–6–2	Carlos Newton	Decision (unanimous)	Shidokan Jitsu: Warriors War 1	February 8, 2001	1	10:00	Kuwait	Return to Middleweight.
Win	27–6–2	Roberto Traven	Decision (unanimous)	Rings: King of Kings 2000 Block A	October 9, 2000	3	5:00	Tokyo, Japan	Heavyweight bout.
Win	26–6–2	Wataru Sakata	Decision (unanimous)	RINGS: King of Kings 2000 Block A	October 9, 2000	2	5:00	Tokyo, Japan	Heavyweight bout.
Loss	25–6–2	Chris Munsen	Decision	RINGS USA: Rising Stars Block B	July 22, 2000	2	5:00	Honolulu, Hawaii, United States	Catchweight 198 lbs bout
Draw	25–5–2	Ryuki Ueyama	Draw	RINGS: Millennium Combine 2	June 15, 2000	2	5:00	Tokyo, Japan	Catchweight 198 lbs bout
Win	25–5–1	Jose Landi-Jons	Decision (majority)	WEF 9: World Class	May 13, 2000	3	5:00	Evansville, Indiana, United States	Won the WEF Cruiserweight (176 lbs) Superfight Championship.
Win	24–5–1	Fabiano Iha	Decision (unanimous)	UFC 24	March 10, 2000	3	5:00	Lake Charles, Louisiana, United States	Welterweight bout.
Loss	23–5–1	Kiyoshi Tamura	Decision (unanimous)	RINGS: King of Kings 1999 Block B	December 22, 1999	2	5:00	Osaka, Japan	Heavyweight debut.
Win	23–4–1	Laverne Clark	Submission (guillotine choke)	EC 29: Extreme Challenge 29	November 13, 1999	2	3:18	Hayward, Wisconsin, United States	
Win	22–4–1	Chris Lytle	Decision (unanimous)	EC 29: Extreme Challenge 29	November 13, 1999	2	5:00	Hayward, Wisconsin, United States	
Win	21–4–1	Jutaro Nakao	Decision (unanimous)	SB 13: SuperBrawl 13	September 7, 1999	3	5:00	Honolulu, Hawaii, United States	
Win	20–4–1	Mark Walker	Submission (rear naked choke)	UW: Ultimate Wrestling	August 13, 1999	1	1:15	Bloomington, Minnesota, United States	
Win	19–4–1	Joe Geromiller	Submission (kneebar)	SFC: Submission Fighting Championships 7	July 4, 1999	1	3:10	Carbondale, Illinois, United States	
Win	18–4–1	CJ Fernandes	Submission (armbar)	Dangerzone: Mahnomen	June 19, 1999	1	0:58	Mahnomen, Minnesota, United States	
Win	17–4–1	Jesse Jones	Decision (unanimous)	EC 25: Extreme Challenge 25	June 11, 1999	1	20:00	Council Bluffs, Iowa, United States	
Win	16–4–1	Brent Medley	TKO (guillotine choke)	EC 25: Extreme Challenge 25	June 11, 1999	1	0:21	Council Bluffs, Iowa, United States	
Win	15–4–1	Dennis Hallman	Decision (unanimous)	Shooto: 10th Anniversary Event	May 29, 1999	3	5:00	Yokohama, Japan	
Win	14–4–1	Jim Czajkowski	Submission (kneebar)	SFC: Submission Fighting Championships 6	April 30, 1999	1	0:00	O'Fallon, Illinois, United States	
Win	13–4–1	Mike McClure	TKO (submission to punches)	EC 23: Extreme Challenge 23	April 2, 1999	1	4:47	Indianapolis, Indiana, United States	
Win	12–4–1	Ken Parham	Decision (unanimous)	EC 23: Extreme Challenge 23	April 2, 1999	1	15:00	Indianapolis, Indiana, United States	
Win	11–4–1	Vernon Yates	Submission (rear-naked choke)	Gladiators 2: Gladiators 2	March 18, 1999	1	0:18	Sioux City, Iowa, United States	
Win	10–4–1	Brett Jones	Submission (rear-naked choke)	Gladiators 2: Gladiators 2	March 18, 1999	1	0:14	Sioux City, Iowa, United States	
Loss	9–4–1	Matt Hughes	Decision (unanimous)	EC 21: Extreme Challenge 21	October 17, 1998	1	15:00	Hayward, Wisconsin, United States	
Win	9–3–1	Adam Johnson	TKO (guillotine choke)	EC 21: Extreme Challenge 21	October 17, 1998	1	0:51	Hayward, Wisconsin, United States	
Draw	8–3–1	Shonie Carter	Draw	EC 20: Extreme Challenge 20	August 22, 1998	1	20:00	Davenport, Iowa, United States	
Win	8–3	Phil Johns	Decision	EC 19: Extreme Challenge 19	June 20, 1998	1	15:00	Hayward, Wisconsin, United States	
Win	7–3	Andy Sanders	Decision	EC 19: Extreme Challenge 19	June 20, 1998	1	15:00	Hayward, Wisconsin, United States	
Win	6–3	Henry Matamoros	Decision	WVT: Wisconsin Vale Tudo	May 30, 1998	1	10:00	Milwaukee, Wisconsin, United States	
Loss	5–3	Adrian Serrano	Decision (split)	WVT: Wisconsin Vale Tudo	April 4, 1998	1	12:00	Milwaukee, Wisconsin, United States	
Loss	5–2	Jesse Jones	Submission (armbar)	EC 15: Extreme Challenge 15	February 27, 1998	1	5:45	Muncie, Indiana, United States	
Loss	5–1	Shonie Carter	Decision	EC 5: Extreme Challenge 5	April 18, 1997	1	15:00	Waterloo, Iowa, United States	
Win	5–0	Laverne Clark	Submission (triangle choke)	EC 5: Extreme Challenge 5	April 18, 1997	1	5:51	Waterloo, Iowa, United States	
Win	4–0	Tim Wills	Submission (bad position)	HOOKnSHOOT: Absolute Fighting Championship 1	April 5, 1997	1	1:06	Evansville, Indiana, United States	Won the HOOKnSHOOT Lightweight Championship.
Win	3–0	Sean Coultas	TKO (towel thrown from armbar)	HOOKnSHOOT: Lightweight Championship	April 4, 1997	1	3:29	Evansville, Indiana, United States	Won the HOOKnSHOOT Lightweight Tournament.
Win	2–0	Adam Fisher	Submission (rear-naked choke)	HOOKnSHOOT: Lightweight Championship	April 4, 1997	1	3:39	Evansville, Indiana, United States	
Win	1–0	Duane Bressinger	Submission (armbar)	HOOKnSHOOT: Lightweight Championship	April 4, 1997	1	2:37	Evansville, Indiana, United States	

== See also ==
- List of male mixed martial artists
- List of UFC champions

New championship	1st UFC Middleweight Champion; September 28, 2001 – January 11, 2002	Succeeded by Murilo Bustamante
