= Fabiano Iha =

Brazilian mixed martial arts fighter

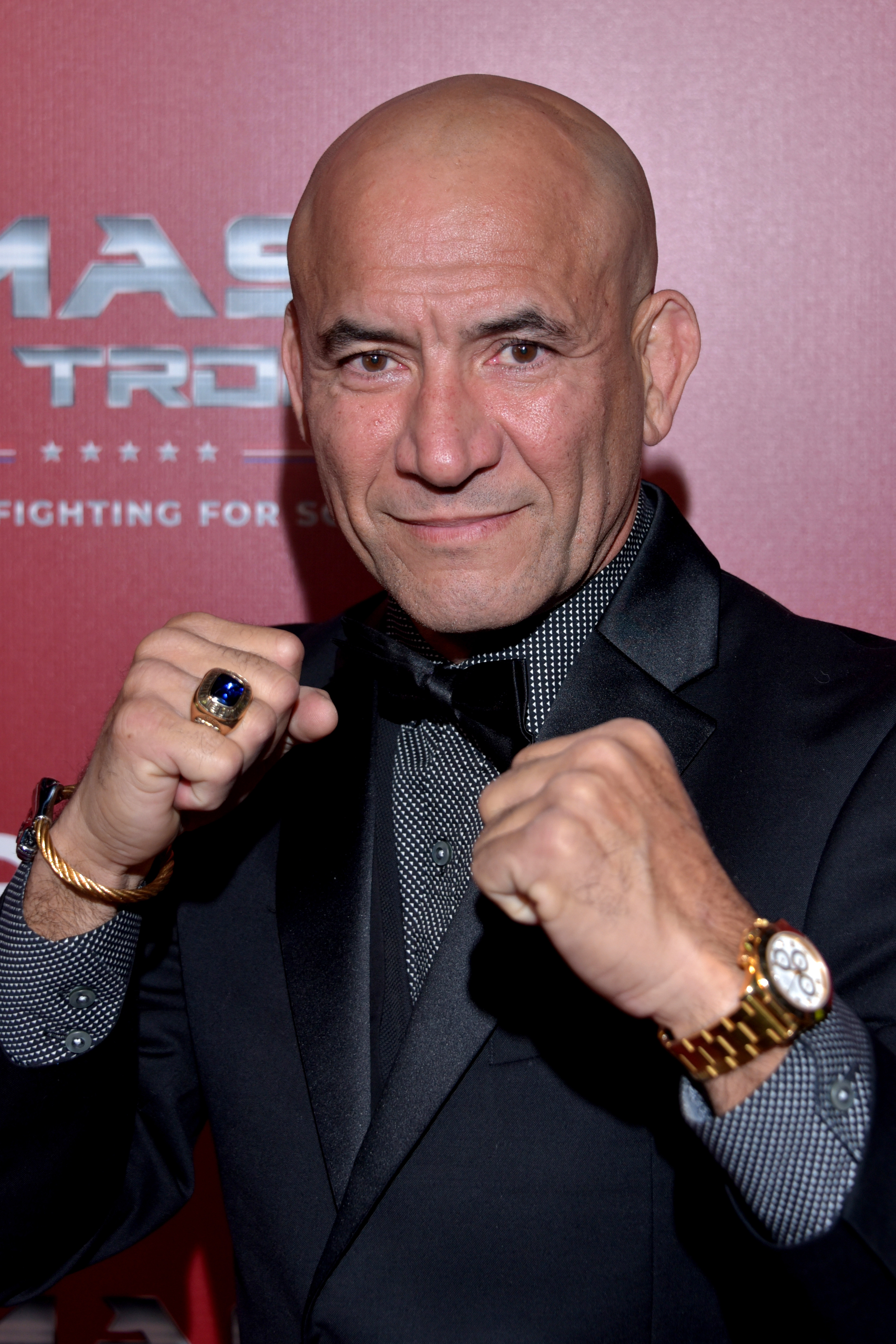
- Fabiano Iha at SMASH Global IX Fight Night 2019
- Born: July 28, 1970 (age 56); Florianópolis, Brazil
- Other names: King of the Armbar
- Height: 5 ft 8 in (1.73 m)
- Weight: 155 lb (70 kg; 11.1 st)
- Division: Lightweight
- Style: Brazilian Jiu-Jitsu, Vale Tudo
- Fighting out of: Beverly Hills, California, United States
- Team: Beverly Hills Jiu-Jitsu Club
- Rank: Black belt in Brazilian Jiu-Jitsu

Mixed martial arts record
- Total: 15
- Wins: 10
- By knockout: 3
- By submission: 7
- Losses: 5
- By knockout: 3
- By decision: 2

Other information
- Mixed martial arts record from Sherdog

Fabiano Iha (Portuguese: [faˈbjɐnu ˈiʁɐ]; born July 28, 1970) is a retired Brazilian mixed martial artist. He competed in the Lightweight division, fighting in several organizations, including the Ultimate Fighting Championship and PRIDE. He won his last fight by KO at LIP 1 - Lockdown in Paradise 1 against John Cox on March 19, 2005. Fabiano Iha received his BJJ black belt from Crolin Gracie.

== Career accomplishments ==
=== Mixed martial arts ===
- Ultimate Fighting Championship
  - UFC Encyclopedia Awards
    - Knockout of the Night (One time) vs. Daiju Takase
    - Submission of the Night (One time) vs. Laverne Clark

== Mixed martial arts record ==
Professional record breakdown
15 matches	10 wins	5 losses
By knockout	3	3
By submission	7	0
By decision	0	2

Res.	Record	Opponent	Method	Event	Date	Round	Time	Location	Notes
Win	10–5	John Cox	KO (punches)	Lockdown in Paradise 1	March 19, 2005	1	0:30	Lahaina, Hawaii, United States	
Win	9–5	Shannon Ritch	Submission (rear-naked choke)	Hitman Fighting Productions 3	May 2, 2003	N/A	N/A	Santa Ana, California, United States	
Win	8–5	Flavio Troccoli	Submission (armbar)	Hitman Fighting Productions 2	November 9, 2002	1	0:53	Santa Ana, California, United States	
Loss	7–5	Din Thomas	Decision (unanimous)	UFC 33	September 28, 2001	3	5:00	Las Vegas, Nevada, United States	
Loss	7–4	Caol Uno	KO (punches)	UFC 32	June 29, 2001	1	1:48	East Rutherford, New Jersey, United States	
Win	7–3	Phil Johns	Submission (armbar)	UFC 30	February 23, 2001	1	2:05	Atlantic City, New Jersey, United States	
Win	6–3	Daiju Takase	TKO (strikes)	UFC 29	December 16, 2000	1	2:24	Tokyo, Japan	
Win	5–3	Laverne Clark	Submission (armbar)	UFC 27	September 22, 2000	1	1:10	New Orleans, Louisiana, United States	
Win	4–3	Danny Bennett	Submission (armbar)	KOTC 4 - Gladiators	June 24, 2000	1	0:49	San Jacinto, California, United States	
Loss	3–3	Dave Menne	Decision (unanimous)	UFC 24	March 10, 2000	3	5:00	Lake Charles, Louisiana, United States	
Loss	3–2	Frank Trigg	TKO (punches)	Pride 8	November 21, 1999	1	5:00	Tokyo, Japan	
Loss	3–1	Laverne Clark	TKO (doctor stoppage)	UFC 20	May 7, 1999	1	1:31	Birmingham, Alabama, United States	
Win	3–0	Cleber Luciano	KO (punch)	Extreme Challenge 22	November 21, 1998	1	7:57	West Valley City, Utah, United States	
Win	2–0	Yves Edwards	Submission (armbar)	Extreme Challenge 22	November 21, 1998	1	3:56	West Valley City, Utah, United States	
Win	1–0	John Borsos	Submission (armbar)	Neutral Grounds 5	June 28, 1998	1	0:25	N/A	

== See also ==
- List of male mixed martial artists
