= LaVerne Clark =

American mixed martial arts fighter

- Born: December 2, 1973 (age 52); Davenport, Iowa, United States
- Other names: Fist of Fury
- Height: 5 ft 11 in (1.80 m)
- Weight: 185 lb (84 kg; 13.2 st)
- Division: Welterweight
- Style: Boxing, Wrestling
- Fighting out of: Bettendorf, Iowa
- Team: Miletich Fighting Systems

Professional boxing record
- Total: 33
- Wins: 14
- By knockout: 9
- Losses: 18
- By knockout: 15
- Draws: 1

Mixed martial arts record
- Total: 49
- Wins: 27
- By knockout: 9
- By submission: 12
- By decision: 6
- Losses: 21
- By knockout: 1
- By submission: 18
- By decision: 1
- By disqualification: 1
- Draws: 1

Other information
- Boxing record from BoxRec
- Mixed martial arts record from Sherdog

LaVerne Clark (born December 2, 1973) is an American retired mixed martial artist and a former professional boxer. Clark is a veteran of the Ultimate Fighting Championship, Maximum Fighting Championship and World Fighting Alliance. Clark holds a professional record of 27–21–1, with notable wins over Mac Danzig, Fabiano Iha, and Shonie Carter. He was the first professional boxer to be successful in the UFC.

== Mixed martial arts career ==
=== Ultimate Fighting Championship ===
Clark is a UFC veteran, whose history with the promotion dates back to the early beginnings of his career. He made his UFC debut just three fights into his career, facing Josh Stewart at UFC 16 on March 13, 1998, and won via strikes. He returned just under a year later, and faced Frank Caracci at UFC 18 on January 8, 1999. Clark won via submission (strikes), advancing his UFC record to 2–0.

After winning another fight in the Extreme Boxing promotion, Clark returned at UFC 20 against Fabiano Iha on May 7, 1999, defeating Iha by TKO (cut). Clark would fight in the UFC two more times, defeating Koji Oishi at UFC 25 via majority decision, and losing to Fabiano Iha at UFC 27 in a rematch via armbar, leaving the promotion with a record of 4 wins and 1 loss.

== Mixed martial arts record ==
Professional record breakdown
49 matches	27 wins	21 losses
By knockout	9	1
By submission	12	18
By decision	6	1
By disqualification	0	1
Draws	1	

Res.	Record	Opponent	Method	Event	Date	Round	Time	Location	Notes
Loss	27–21–1	Mark Stoddard	Submission (verbal)	Caged Aggression 12: Night Two	March 15, 2014	1	1:43	Davenport, Iowa, United States	
Loss	27–20–1	Evan Vasquez Matus	Submission (triangle choke)	CBB: Coco Beach Brawl	April 28, 2012	1	4:59	Guanacaste, Costa Rica	
Loss	27–19–1	Brian Foster	Submission (armbar)	Capital City Cage Wars 7	October 15, 2011	1	2:31	Springfield, Illinois, United States	
Win	27–18–1	Sean Salmon	KO (punches)	Fight Tour	August 20, 2011	1	3:22	Rockford, Illinois, United States	
Loss	26–18–1	Sean Huffman	DQ	Blueblood MMA: Trials of a Gladiator 9	February 4, 2011	N/A	N/A	Iowa, United States	
Win	26–17–1	Evan Marks	Submission (rear-naked choke)	Blueblood MMA: Trials of a Gladiator 6	April 30, 2010	1	3:38	Iowa, United States	
Loss	25–17–1	Ryan Ford	Submission (guillotine choke)	MFC 18: Famous	September 28, 2008	2	2:30	Edmonton, Alberta, Canada	
Win	25–16–1	Matt Kelly	TKO	CFC 12: Courage Fighting Championships 12	June 27, 2008	1	1:57	Decatur, Illinois, United States	
Win	24–16–1	Aaron Smith	Submission (strikes)	CFC 11: Courage Fighting Championships 11	May 2, 2008	1	3:32	Champaign, Illinois, United States	
Win	23–16–1	Zeke Shiling	Submission (rear naked choke)	CFC 9: Courage Fighting Championships 9	June 20, 2007	1	0:26	Indiana, United States	
Loss	22–16–1	Aaron Wetherspoon	Submission (armbar)	KOTC: Sinister	April 27, 2007	1	3:10	California, United States	For the KOTC Welterweight Championship.
Loss	22–15–1	Chris Wilson	Submission (triangle choke)	SF 17: Hot Zone	August 5, 2006	1	3:51	Oregon, United States	
Win	22–14–1	Victor Moreno	Decision (unanimous)	KOTC: Redemption on the River	February 17, 2006	3	5:00	Illinois, United States	
Win	21–14–1	Jamie Woods	KO	CFC 4: Courage Fighting Championships 4	January 7, 2006	1		Illinois, United States	
Loss	20–14–1	Jake Ellenberger	Submission (triangle choke)	KOTC 64: Raging Bull	December 16, 2005	2	3:06	Ohio, United States	
Win	20–13–1	Cruz Chacon	TKO	EC 65: Extreme Challenge 65	October 21, 2005	1	3:35	Medina, Minn	
Win	19–13–1	Jake Jetter	Submission (armbar)	XFO 7: Xtreme Fighting Organization 7	August 27, 2005	1	1:53	Illinois, United States	
Draw	18–13–1	Melvin Guillard	Draw	RCF: Dual in the Delta	September 25, 2004	3		Mississippi, United States	
Win	18–13	John Moore	Submission (arm triangle choke)	ICE 11: ICE XI	September 4, 2004	1	2:04	Ohio, United States	
Win	17–13	Kevin Knabjan	KO	CFC 1: Courage Fighting Championships 1	July 24, 2004	2	0:10	Illinois, United States	
Loss	16–13	Buck Greer	Submission (triangle choke)	PXC 2: Chaos	May 22, 2004	2	1:03	Guam	
Loss	16–12	Jorge Santiago	Submission (triangle choke)	HFC 2: Hardcore Fighting Championships 2	October 18, 2003	1	2:17	Massachusetts, United States	
Win	16–11	Mac Danzig	Decision (unanimous)	EC 54: Extreme Challenge 54	October 12, 2003	3	3:00	Illinois, United States	
Win	15–11	Rafal Piszczek	Decision (unanimous)	EC 54: Extreme Challenge 54	October 12, 2003	3	5:00	Illinois, United States	
Loss	14–11	Chris Lytle	Decision (unanimous)	Battleground 1: War Cry	July 19, 2003	3	5:00	Illinois, United States	
Win	14–10	Miguel Menendez	TKO	HFC 1: Hardcore Fighting Championships 1	May 24, 2003	2	0:45	Massachusetts, United States	
Win	13–10	Donald Ouimet	Decision (unanimous)	UCC Hawaii: Eruption in Hawaii	September 17, 2002	3	5:00	Hawaii, United States	
Loss	12–10	Ryuki Ueyama	TKO (towel thrown)	Deep: 3rd Impact	December 23, 2001	1	5:00	Tokyo, Japan	
Loss	12–9	Frank Trigg	Submission (strikes)	World Fighting Alliance 1	November 3, 2001	3	2:15	Nevada, United States	
Loss	12–8	Daiju Takase	Submission (triangle choke)	Pancrase: 2001 Neo-Blood Tournament Opening Round	July 29, 2001	2	0:16	Tokyo, Japan	
Win	12–7	Earnest Knight	Submission (strikes)	Gladiators 16: Gladiators 16	June 30, 2001	1		Iowa, United States	
Loss	11–7	Jutaro Nakao	Technical Submission (triangle choke)	HOOKnSHOOT: Masters	May 26, 2001	3	3:50	Indiana, United States	
Loss	11–6	Chatt Lavender	Submission (armbar)	Rings USA: Battle of Champions	March 17, 2001	2	1:04	Iowa, United States	
Loss	11–5	Fabiano Iha	Submission (armbar)	UFC 27	September 22, 2000	1	1:10	Louisiana, United States	
Win	11–4	Cedric Marks	Submission (choke)	EC 35: Extreme Challenge 35	June 29, 2000	2	3:24	Iowa, United States	
Win	10–4	Koji Oishi	Decision (majority)	UFC 25	April 14, 2000	3	5:00	Yoyogi Gym	
Win	9–4	John Lewis	Decision (unanimous)	WEF 8: Goin' Platinum	January 15, 2000	3	5:00	Georgia, United States	
Win	8–4	John Paun	TKO (guillotine choke)	EC 29: Extreme Challenge 29	November 13, 1999	1	0:45	Wisconsin, United States	
Loss	7–4	Matt Hughes	Submission (rear naked choke)	EC 29: Extreme Challenge 29	November 13, 1999	2	1:35	Wisconsin, United States	
Loss	7–3	Dave Menne	Submission (guillotine choke)	EC 29: Extreme Challenge 29	November 13, 1999	2	3:18	Wisconsin, United States	
Win	7–2	CJ Fernandes	Submission (injury)	EC 26: Extreme Challenge 26	July 21, 1999	1	3:00	Illinois, United States	
Win	6–2	Fabiano Iha	TKO (cut)	UFC 20	May 7, 1999	1	1:31	Alabama, United States	
Win	5–2	James Julian	Submission (strikes)	EB 2: Extreme Boxing 2	February 17, 1999	1	2:08	Iowa, United States	
Win	4–2	Frank Caracci	Submission (strikes)	UFC 18	January 8, 1999	1	6:52	Louisiana, United States	
Win	3–2	Dave Yoder	Submission (rear naked choke)	EC 20: Extreme Challenge 20	August 22, 1998	1	4:35	Iowa, United States	
Win	2–2	Josh Stewart	TKO (strikes)	UFC 16	March 13, 1998	1		Louisiana, United States	
Loss	1–2	Dave Menne	Submission (triangle choke)	EC 5: Extreme Challenge 5	April 18, 1997	1	5:51	Iowa, United States	
Loss	1–1	Brian Dunn	Submission (guillotine choke)	EC 4: Extreme Challenge 4	February 22, 1997	1	3:26	Iowa, United States	
Win	1–0	Shonie Carter	KO (punches)	EC 3: Extreme Challenge 3	February 15, 1997	1	0:09	Iowa, United States	

== Professional boxing record ==
14 Wins (9 knockouts, 5 decisions), 18 Losses (15 knockouts, 3 decisions), 1 Draw
Result	Record	Opponent	Type	Round	Date	Location	Notes
Loss	10–0	(United States) Allan Green	TKO	3	March 5, 2004	(United States) Pala Casino Resort and Spa, Pala, California	Referee stopped the bout at 0:28 of the third round.
Loss	19–0	(Poland) Tomasz Adamek	TKO	3	October 18, 2002	(Poland) Kozienice	Polish International Light Heavyweight Title.
Loss	11–0	(United States) Sammy Merza	DQ	2	June 21, 2002	(United States) Fiesta Palace, Waukegan, Illinois	Clark disqualified at 1:47 of the second round for a low blow.
Loss	21–2	(United States) Anwar Oshana	KO	3	April 26, 2002	(United States) Ramada Inn, Rosemont, Illinois	Clark knocked out at 1:13 of the third round.
Win	4–5	(United States) Art Davis	KO	1	March 3, 2002	(United States) Latin American Social Club, Sterling, Illinois	Davis knocked out at 1:47 of the first round.
Loss	13–1	(United States) Oscar Bravo	KO	2	November 21, 2001	(United States) Ramada Inn, Rosemont, Illinois	Clark knocked out at 1:33 of the second round.
Loss	7–1	(United States) Gilbert Venegas	UD	4	September 28, 2001	(United States) Knox County Fairgrounds, Knoxville, Illinois	
Loss	5–2–2	(United States) Kwan Manasseh	KO	2	February 2, 2001	(United States) Illinois	
Loss	4–6–2	(United States) Kevin Vining	PTS	6	December 1, 2000	(United States) Minnesota	
Loss	34–6	(United States) Charles "The Hatchet" Brewer	KO	2	March 3, 2000	(United States) Turning Stone Resort & Casino, Verona, New York	
Win	8–93–2	(United States) Donnie Penelton	UD	4	February 17, 2000	(United States) River Center, Davenport, Iowa	
Loss	22–0–1	(Australia) Glen Kelly	TKO	6	November 22, 1999	(Australia) Hurstville Civic Centre, Sydney	
Loss	29–3–3	(Canada) Eric Lucas	KO	5	May 28, 1999	(Canada) Molson Centre, Montreal, Quebec	Clark knocked out at 1:21 of the fifth round.
Win	5–0–1	(Canada) Jason Stewarson	UD	4	April 24, 1999	(United States) Veteran's Coliseum, Cedar Rapids, Iowa	
Win	0–1	(United States) Larry Hyatt	KO	1	March 23, 1999	(United States) Vic Ferrari's, Davenport, Iowa	Hyatt knocked out at 2:35 of the first round.
Loss	7–0	(United States) Ali Supreme	TKO	5	February 5, 1999	(United States) Chicago Racquet Club, Chicago, Illinois	Referee stopped the bout at 2:19 of the fifth round.
Win	3–20	(United States) Harold Johnson	TKO	1	January 20, 1999	(United States) Lady Luck Casino, Davenport, Iowa	Referee stopped the bout at 2:15 of the first round.
Loss	15–0	(United States) "Fabulous" Fred Moore	KO	4	October 1, 1998	(United States) Rochester, Minnesota	
Win	13–1	(Puerto Rico) Aníbal Santiago Acevedo	TKO	1	September 19, 1998	Moca, Puerto Rico	
Win	0–17	(United States) Leon Shavers	TKO	1	August 29, 1998	(United States) Waterloo, Iowa	Referee stopped the bout at 1:24 of the first round.
Loss	9–0	(Germany) Thomas Ulrich	KO	2	May 2, 1998	(Germany) Hansehalle, Lübeck, Schleswig-Holstein	
Loss	10–0	(Denmark) Peter H Madsen	TKO	3	March 20, 1998	(Denmark) Vejby-Risskov Hallen, Aarhus	
Loss	11–0	(United States) Randie Carver	TKO	5	December 13, 1997	(United States) Amphitheater, Pompano Beach, Florida	
Win	21–12–3	(Mexico) Nino Cirilo	PTS	6	October 4, 1997	(United States) Rochester, Minnesota	
Draw	3–1	(United States) Anthony Bonsante	PTS	6	September 13, 1997	(United States) Mandan, North Dakota	
Win	0–2	(Canada) Wilfred Ash	KO	1	June 6, 1997	(Canada) Winnipeg, Manitoba	Ash knocked out at 2:30 of the first round.
Loss	14–0	(Norway) Thomas Hansvoll	TKO	4	May 2, 1997	(Denmark) Randers Hallen, Randers	
Win	1–22	(United States) Tyrone Bledsoe	TKO	2	April 12, 1997	(United States) Dubuque Fairgrounds, Dubuque, Iowa	Referee stopped the bout at 1:20 of the second round.
Loss	1–0	(United States) Mike Winklejohn	TKO	2	April 9, 1997	(United States) Inland Expo Center, Westmont, Illinois	Referee stopped the bout at 1:52 of the second round.
Win	5–2–1	(United States) Darrin Wagner	TKO	3	March 28, 1997	(United States) Rochester, Minnesota	
Win	1–21	(United States) Tyrone Bledsoe	KO	1	November 30, 1996	(United States) Latin Club, Sterling, Illinois	Bledsoe knocked out at 2:35 of the first round.
Win	4–33	(United States) Tony Golden	UD	4	September 28, 1996	(United States) Lady Luck Casino, Davenport, Iowa	
Win	9–26–2	(United States) Marris Virgil	MD	4	June 16, 1996	(United States) Lady Luck Casino, Davenport, Iowa	
