= Ian Freeman =

Activist and cryptocurrency advocate

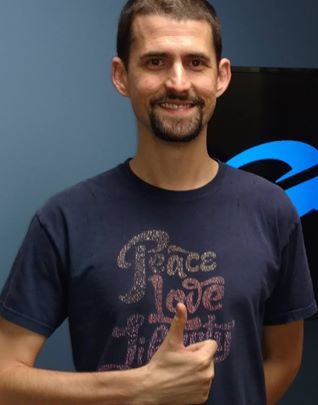
- Freeman in 2016
- Born: Ian Bernard; United States

Other information
- Website: https://www.freeiannow.org/

Ian Freeman (born Ian Bernard) is an American libertarian activist, radio host, and cryptocurrency advocate based in Keene, New Hampshire. He is the founder and a host of Free Talk Live, a nationally syndicated libertarian talk radio show, and a co-founder of the Shire Free Church. In 2022, he was convicted on federal charges related to operating an unlicensed cryptocurrency exchange business, and was sentenced to eight years in federal prison in 2023. His conviction and imprisonment have elicited debate over federal law enforcement of cryptocurrency.

== Biography ==
Freeman was born and raised on the Gulf Coast of Florida. He studied radio and television at Manatee County Community College. This led to Freeman filing a DJ job at a rock station in Sarasota. In 1999, he met Mark "Edge" Edgington, a colleague, and together they started Free Talk Live. The show grew into a nationally syndicated libertarian talk radio program, eventually broadcasting on 185 radio stations across the United States and rated by the radio-industry publication Talkers as the 25th most influential program in the US.

Freeman moved from Florida to New Hampshire in 2006 as an early participant in the Free State Project (FSP), a movement to recruit 20,000 libertarians to relocate to New Hampshire in order to influence the state's politics in favor of the ideals of libertarianism. He moved to Keene and was involved in the Free Keene movement and social activism.

=== Activism ===
Freeman and other members of the "Free Keene" group in New Hampshire paid for expired parking meters, a practice they dubbed "Robin Hooding," as a form of ideological protest against municipal government and to promote "voluntarist" beliefs. This act of "civil disobedience" received national attention on The Colbert Report in a segment titled "Difference Makers - The Robin Hood of Keene", where Stephen Colbert satirically profiled their battle against the city's "meter maids". Freeman also spent several years as a journalist. In 2014, he reported that at least 15 Free State participants had won seats in the New Hampshire House.

==== Bitcoin advocacy ====
In December 2010, Freeman first heard of Bitcoin from a caller of Free Talk Live. Initially, Freeman was skeptical of Bitcoin but eventually became an advocate in 2011. He viewed it as a tool to undermine the government control of money. Freeman's early Bitcoin advocacy made Keene a hub of retail activity with Forbes calling the town a "crypto mecca". By 2019, twenty businesses accepted cryptocurrency as mode of payment, in part, due to Freeman's efforts.

Freeman operated several Bitcoin vending machines in New Hampshire and sold Bitcoin online through a platform named LocalBitcoins, facilitating thousands of transactions. In March 2011, Freeman was one of the earliest media mentions of the Silk Road marketplace founded by Ross Ulbricht, when the site had only 151 registered users. On his show, he observed, "This could be the killer app for Bitcoins." noting that it "eliminated dangers" from the drug-buying process for both sellers and buyers. In 2012, Freeman co-founded the Shire Free Church with 4 other individuals, including Edgington. Freeman stated that the church's mission was to promote peace through the widespread adoption of Bitcoin as an alternative to government-controlled currency.

In 2018, when Facebook purged several political pages, Freeman was quoted on the Cop Block website encouraging libertarians and police accountability activists to build alternative platforms, recommending decentralized social networks such as Mastodon's Liberdon instance.

=== Prosecution ===
Freeman was investigated by the federal government under the assumption that he was operating unlicensed money transmitters in the form of his Bitcoin kiosks. This investigation included the FBI, the U.S. Treasury, and other federal and local government agencies.

On March 16, 2021, federal agents conducted a raid on the Freeman residence with 2 armored BearCat G3 vehicles and several SUVs. During the raid, agents broke through a first-floor window using a ramming pole attached to one of the BearCats, deployed a drone and threw grenades inside his residence. Freeman's partner, Bonnie Kruse reported that she was made to walk through broken glass at point during the raid.

The Federal agents confiscated approximately $180,000 in cash, precious metals, which included a 100-ounce Swiss silver bar, a platinum coin stamped with a portrait of Ron Paul, boxes of gold bills called Goldbacks, 2 Casascius physical Bitcoins that were worth $400,000 at the time, and various computers. Bitcoin vending machines were also seized from the Bitcoin Embassy, the Campus Convenience store, Murphy's Taproom in Keene, and the Red Arrow Diner in Nashua.

6 people were arrested that day a group that became known as the "Crypto Six": Freeman; his co-host Aria DiMezzo; a man legally named Nobody (born Richard Paul); Colleen Fordham; and Andrew and Renee Spinella. The original indictment alleged that the group had "exchanged in excess of $10,000,000 for virtual currency". Freeman initially faced 25 counts, 17 of them were dropped prior to his trial, which included several counts in relation to bank and wire frauds.

The government alleged that Freeman operated an unlicensed money-transmitting business, failed to register with the Financial Crimes Enforcement Network, disabled "know your customer" features on his Bitcoin kiosks, and created a business environment that "catered to fraudsters".

At the time of sentencing, Freeman told the judge that he did believe he was in infringement of the law and said that he had worked to detect fraud and protect victims of scams. He stated: "I failed to detect and prevent 100 percent of the scam victims... I take full responsibility for my failure". He further stated "The scammers are so persuasive, they will get their victims to lie. I was tricked by these scam victims...it was clear I was trying to catch and prevent scammers."

Freeman was the only one of the 6 defendants to go to trial; the others accepted plea deals or had charges dropped. After a 2-week trial in December 2022, a federal jury found Freeman guilty on all remaining counts, including conspiracy to operate an unlicensed money transmitting business, conspiracy to commit money laundering, money laundering, and four counts of tax evasion.

On October 2, 2023, U.S. District Judge Joseph LaPlante sentenced Freeman to 96 months in prison, two years of supervised release and a $40,000 fine. In February 2024, Judge LaPlante ordered Freeman to pay $3,502,708.69 in restitution to 29 fraud victims. On appeal, Freeman argued that the district court should not have allowed the money-transmitting business charges to reach trial, invoking the major questions doctrine, stating that the relevant statutes should be interpreted in such a manner that it disallows agencies to regulate virtual currencies such as Bitcoin. He also argued that there was not sufficient evidence for his conviction pertaining to tax evasion and maintained that prejudicial evidence from the acquitted money laundering charge may have influenced the jury on the other counts, and that his 96-month sentence was substantively unreasonable. The appellate court affirmed Freeman's conviction in full, finding his appeal "chock-full of major questions rhetoric, but under scrutiny, it bears little resemblance to the line of extraordinary cases the Supreme Court has held triggers the major questions doctrine.

==== Reactions to prosecution ====
Freeman's case drew significant support from libertarian and cryptocurrency communities. Supporters protested outside the federal courthouse at multiple hearings, and at his sentencing, they gave him a standing ovation when he entered the courtroom. A local crypto activist named Christopher Waid filmed the raids and printed T-shirts reading "Free the Crypto Six," which became a regular sight around Keene. A Free State activist named Dave Ridley organized jail rallies and later undertook a 24-day march from Keene to Concord dressed as "Bitcoin Gandhi", calling for the federal government to distance itself from the case and warning against "a Venezuelan-style slide into currency fascism."

Freeman's wife, Bonnie Freeman, spoke at his sentencing, saying: "These people were extremely ignorant about Bitcoin and what it is and what Ian was doing and the scams that were happening. And they made an ignorant decision to convict him, possibly out of spite because they didn't like him, possibly because his wife is young". David Hathaway, the sheriff of Santa Cruz County, Arizona, spoke at the sentencing hearing, describing Freeman as "an advocate for freedom and the American dream" who embodied "the founding spirit of this country", and warned that a harsh sentence would set a negative precedent for similar cryptocurrency cases. Erik Voorhees, a cryptocurrency advocate who once frequented the same New Hampshire communities, commented on Freeman's prosecution: "It sounds like he is guilty of free made."

Freeman's supporters framed the prosecution as government overreach against cryptocurrency itself. Freeman stated "My arrest was one of many similar arrests going on across the country over several years...They target a peaceful bitcoin seller who has not harmed anyone and then hit him with so many charges he taps out for a plea deal." He also said "They can't control Bitcoin. That's why they hate it." Defense attorney Sisti disputed the prosecution's characterization of the victims, saying: "There was no finding that these so-called victims were, 'vulnerable' They pursued this activity on their own. They were very intelligent people." He added: "This was no stealing granny's piggybank, this was dealing with sophisticated individuals that were involved in moving money around, and cryptocurrency on their own." Freeman himself noted what he saw as a double standard: "I had no idea they were victims of scams," and argued his KYC practices exceeded what banks required, yet banks were never charged for processing the same scammers' transactions.
