= 2001 in UFC =

Mixed martial arts events

Information
- First date: February 23, 2001
- Last date: November 2, 2001

Events
- Total events: 5
- UFC: 5

Fights
- Total fights: 40
- Title fights: 10

Chronology
2000 in UFC	2001 in UFC	2002 in UFC

The year 2001 was the 9th year in the history of the Ultimate Fighting Championship (UFC), a mixed martial arts promotion based in the United States. In 2001 the UFC held 5 events beginning with, UFC 30: Battle on the Boardwalk.

== Title fights ==
Title fights in 2001
Weight class				Method	Round	Time	Event	Notes
Lightweight	Jens Pulver	def.	Caol Uno	Decision (majority)	5	5:00	UFC 30: Battle on the Boardwalk	(Note: For the UFC Lightweight Championship.)
Light Heavyweight	Tito Ortiz (c)	def.	Evan Tanner	KO (slam)	1	0:30	UFC 30: Battle on the Boardwalk	(Note: For the UFC Light Heavyweight Championship.)
Welterweight	Carlos Newton	def.	Pat Miletich (c)	Submission (bulldog choke)	3	2:50	UFC 31: Locked and Loaded	(Note: For the UFC Welterweight Championship.)
Heavyweight	Randy Couture (c)	def.	Pedro Rizzo	Decision (unanimous)	5	5:00	UFC 31: Locked and Loaded	(Note: For the UFC Heavyweight Championship.)
Light Heavyweight	Tito Ortiz (c)	def.	Elvis Sinosic	TKO (punches and elbows)	1	3:32	UFC 32: Showdown in the Meadowlands	(Note: For the UFC Light Heavyweight Championship.)
Middleweight	Dave Menne	def.	Gil Castillo	Decision (unanimous)	5	5:00	UFC 33: Victory in Vegas	(Note: For the UFC Middleweight Championship.)
Lightweight	Jens Pulver (c)	def.	Dennis Hallman	Decision (unanimous)	5	5:00	UFC 33: Victory in Vegas	(Note: For the UFC Lightweight Championship.)
Light Heavyweight	Tito Ortiz (c)	def.	Vladimir Matyushenko	Decision (unanimous)	5	5:00	UFC 33: Victory in Vegas	(Note: For the UFC Light Heavyweight Championship.)
Welterweight	Matt Hughes	def.	Carlos Newton (c)	KO (slam)	2	1:23	UFC 34: High Voltage	(Note: For the UFC Welterweight Championship.)
Heavyweight	Randy Couture (c)	def.	Pedro Rizzo	TKO (referee stoppage due to punches)	3	3:22	UFC 34: High Voltage	(Note: For the UFC Heavyweight Championship.)

== Debut UFC fighters ==
The following fighters fought their first UFC fight in 2001:

ISO	Fighter	Division
(United States)	B.J. Penn	Welterweight
(Japan)	Caol Uno	Lightweight
(United States)	Curtis Stout	Middleweight
(United States)	Din Thomas	Lightweight
(Australia)	Elvis Sinosic	Light Heavyweight
(United States)	Frank Mir	Heavyweight
(United States)	Gil Castillo	Middleweight
(United States)	Homer Moore	Light Heavyweight

ISO	Fighter	Division
(United States)	Joey Gilbert	Middleweight
(Japan)	Jutaro Nakao	Welterweight
(United States)	Mark Robinson	Heavyweight
(United States)	Matt Serra	Lightweight
(United States)	Paul Rodriguez	Lightweight
(United States)	Phil Baroni	Middleweight
(United States)	Phil Johns	Lightweight
(Brazil)	Ricardo Almeida	Welterweight

ISO	Fighter	Division
(United States)	Ricco Rodriguez	Heavyweight
(United States)	Sean Sherk	Lightweight
(Netherlands)	Semmy Schilt	Heavyweight
(United States)	Steve Berger	Welterweight
(Peru)	Tony DeSouza	Welterweight
(Belarus)	Vladimir Matyushenko	Light Heavyweight
(The Bahamas)	Yves Edwards	Lightweight

== Events list ==
#	Event	Date	Venue	Location	Attendance
038	UFC 34: High Voltage	Nov 2, 2001	MGM Grand Garden Arena	Las Vegas, Nevada, U.S.	
037	UFC 33: Victory in Vegas	Sep 28, 2001	Mandalay Bay Events Center	Las Vegas, Nevada, U.S.	9,500
036	UFC 32: Showdown in the Meadowlands	Jun 29, 2001	Continental Airlines Arena	East Rutherford, New Jersey, U.S.	12,500
035	UFC 31: Locked and Loaded	May 4, 2001	Trump Taj Mahal Casino Resort	Atlantic City, New Jersey, U.S.	—N/a
034	UFC 30: Battle on the Boardwalk	Feb 23, 2001	Trump Taj Mahal Casino Resort	Atlantic City, New Jersey, U.S.	3,000

== See also ==
- UFC
- List of UFC champions
- List of UFC events
