= Evan Tanner =

American mixed martial arts fighter (1971–2008)

- Tanner in 2005
- Born: Evan Lloyd Tanner; February 11, 1971; Amarillo, Texas, US
- Died: September 5, 2008 (aged 37) near Palo Verde, California, US
- Height: 6 ft 0 in (1.83 m)
- Weight: 185 lb (84 kg; 13.2 st)
- Division: Middleweight; Light Heavyweight; Heavyweight
- Reach: 74 in (188 cm)
- Team: Hard Knocks Kickboxing; Team Quest; Chute Boxe USA; American Top Team; USA Stars
- Rank: Black belt in Brazilian jiu-jitsu under Cesar Gracie
- Years active: 1997–2008

Mixed martial arts record
- Total: 40
- Wins: 32
- By knockout: 12
- By submission: 17
- By decision: 3
- Losses: 8
- By knockout: 6
- By submission: 1
- By decision: 1

Other information
- Mixed martial arts record from Sherdog

Evan Lloyd Tanner (February 11, 1971 – September 5, 2008) was an American professional mixed martial arts fighter. He was a former UFC Middleweight Champion and was the first American to win the Pancrase Neo-Blood tournament in Tokyo, Japan.

Tanner won the UFC Middleweight Championship at UFC 51, stopping David Terrell with strikes in the first round. He is considered a pioneer in the sport of MMA and one of the first fighters to use elbows as an effective striking method in the ground and pound position.

Tanner is unusual among MMA-fighters, as he began his professional career with a large degree of success despite primarily learning the sport via instructional videotape. He was also one of the first MMA fighters to use social media as a platform to connect with fans.

Tanner earned notable career victories over former UFC Welterweight Champion Robbie Lawler, former King of Pancrase Middleweight and Welterweight Champion Kiuma Kunioku, Heath Herring, Paul Buentello, Phil Baroni (x2) and Ikuhisa Minowa, among others.

== Background ==
Tanner was born in Amarillo, Texas, and graduated in 1989 from Caprock High School, where he won the Texas state championship in Greco-Roman wrestling as a junior and senior despite only entering the sport in his second year of high school. He attended Simpson College in Iowa, but dropped out when he was 19. He worked various jobs around the country as a bouncer, cable television contractor, framer building beach houses, dishwasher, baker, ditch digger, and slaughterhouse worker. He attended the University of Oklahoma for one semester before returning to Amarillo, where he entered a mixed martial arts tournament.

During his UFC career, Tanner lived in Portland, Oregon and Las Vegas, Nevada. In 2008, he relocated to Oceanside, California.

== Mixed martial arts career ==
=== Early career ===
Tanner, with a wrestling background, began fighting in 1997 when he was convinced by friends to enter a local MMA tournament hosted by the now defunct Unified Shoot Wrestling Federation. He won the tournament by defeating three fighters in one night, including future UFC heavyweight contender Paul Buentello.

After his initial success, Tanner taught himself submission and grappling techniques using instructional videos created by the famous Gracie family. He continued to fight in local shows and tournaments in Texas and Iowa before traveling to Japan to compete in the Pancrase organization. He won five fights overseas and competed in the USWF once more before being asked to join the UFC.

Tanner made his UFC debut in 1999 at UFC 18, submitting fellow Amarillo native Darrell Gholar by rear naked choke in the first round. His next UFC fight was at UFC 19 against Valerie Ignatov, who was known for leg submissions. Because of this, Tanner decided to fight barefoot for the first time in his career.

Tanner fought once more in Pancrase and defended his title two more times in the USWF before deciding to take the first of multiple breaks from fighting in his career. He returned in July 2000 and remained undefeated in the USWF, successfully defending his heavyweight belt with wins against Raoul Romero and Vinny Nixon. His next appearance was at UFC 29, where he defeated Lance Gibson by TKO.

=== A new outlook on fighting ===
With three victories in the UFC, Tanner received a title shot against UFC light heavyweight champion Tito Ortiz at UFC 30. He was knocked unconscious 32 seconds into the first round by a high level slam by Ortiz.

Tanner was invited to compete in the −88 kg division at the 2001 ADCC Submission Wrestling World Championship April 11–13, 2001 at the Abu Dhabi Combat Club in Abu Dhabi, United Arab Emirates. He was defeated by Sanae Kikuta on points (6–0) in the first round.

Tanner began training with Oregon-based Team Quest. He returned to the Octagon at UFC 34, defeating Homer Moore in the second round with an armbar. At UFC 36, he defeated Elvis Sinosic by TKO (cut). At UFC 38, he won a unanimous decision over Chris Haseman in an undercard bout. At UFC 42, he lost to Rich Franklin by TKO (strikes) in the first round. After his defeat by Franklin, Tanner moved to the middleweight division, where he would be more physically imposing than many of the opponents.

=== Baroni I and II ===
Tanner faced Phil Baroni in consecutive fights at UFC 45 and UFC 48. In the early minutes of their fight at UFC 45, Baroni was in control, but Tanner took Baroni to the ground and landed a series of unanswered punches and elbows. After a brief verbal exchange between Baroni and referee Larry Landless, the fight was stopped and Tanner was awarded the victory. Immediately after the fight, Baroni contended that he did not submit and in the confusion struck Landless twice in the face. Baroni maintained that it was a verbal miscommunication and he never asked for the fight to be stopped. To quell the controversy, the UFC agreed to give Baroni a rematch at UFC 48, which Tanner won.

=== Road to the UFC Middleweight title ===
Tanner defeated Robbie Lawler at UFC 50 in October 2004, submitting Lawler with a triangle choke. Afterward, Tanner began training on his own.

He fought for the vacant UFC middleweight championship against David Terrell at UFC 51 in February 2005. He defeated Terrell to become the first UFC middleweight champion since Murilo Bustamante held the title before leaving for PRIDE Fighting Championships in 2002.

Tanner fought Franklin again at UFC 53 in June 2005. Franklin won when the fight was stopped by the ringside doctor due to multiple cuts and swelling on Tanner's face. With the win, Franklin was named as a coach for The Ultimate Fighter 2 reality television show, along with then UFC Welterweight champion Matt Hughes. While Franklin and Hughes did not fight at the conclusion of the show, Hughes said he would have challenged Tanner for the UFC middleweight title if Tanner had been a coach on the show.

After losing the title, Tanner began training with American Top Team, but lost his next fight to David Loiseau at Ultimate Fight Night 2 in October 2005. Tanner was ahead on points until the fight was stopped in the second round due to a cut received from a Loiseau elbow.

Shortly after this fight, Tanner appeared as himself on an episode of Beyond the Glory on FOX Sports that chronicled the history of the UFC. He also became a member of the Chute Boxe team.

Tanner returned to the UFC in April 2006 at UFC 59, defeating Justin Levens in what was Tanner's last victory in MMA. Levens was a late replacement for Jeremy Horn, who was forced to withdraw after a training injury.

=== 2006–08 ===
On December 29, 2006, Tanner unveiled plans to set up a mixed martial arts training camp at his house in Gresham, Oregon for disadvantaged athletes and young men at risk. In February 2007, he announced that 12 athletes would reside in the house from six different weight classes. In a March 2007 interview with MMA Weekly, Tanner was asked about the possibility of fighting again, but said he wanted to focus on developing his foundation. He said he would be training year-round with the athletes he was coaching and that it might only be a matter of time before he returned. UFC president Dana White was interviewed by CBS Sportsline one week later and said Tanner would be welcomed back whenever he was ready.

On May 11, 2007, further foundation development was put on hold by Tanner, citing his own training and a bad experience with the first fighter that was invited to the house. Tanner announced through his official website that he would return to active competition and attempt to regain the UFC middleweight title.

Speculation arose that Tanner would return to the UFC in December 2007 at UFC 79 against Dean Lister. Tanner dismissed the report as he was battling an alcohol addiction. He left Chute Boxe and began training at Hard Knocks Kickboxing in Las Vegas.

On November 8, 2007, Tanner announced the signing of a four-fight deal with the UFC. He chose to accept no corporate sponsorships and instead started "Team Tanner," an exclusive fan club for his upcoming fights.

His first fight back in the UFC was at UFC 82, where he lost to Japanese fighter Yushin Okami by knockout in the second round.

In what would be his final fight, Tanner lost to Kendall Grove in a split decision at The Ultimate Fighter 7 Finale on June 21, 2008, the fifth loss in his last ten fights. In a post-match interview, he said he felt "flat" throughout the fight and that he had begun wondering if his two years of serious alcohol abuse had damaged his body past the point of which he could compete at the level he once had.

== Death ==
In the summer of 2008, Tanner announced plans for a solo trip to the Imperial County, California desert. After concerns were raised, he responded on August 27, 2008. "It seems some MMA (Mixed Martial Arts) websites have reported on the story, posting up that I might die out in the desert, or that it might be my greatest opponent yet, etc. Come on, guys. It's really common down in Southern California to go out to the off-road recreation areas in the desert about an hour away from LA and San Diego. So my plan is to go out to the desert, do some camping, ride the motorcycle, and shoot some guns. Sounds like a lot of fun to me. A lot of people do it. This isn't a version of 'Into the Wild.'"

He purchased a dirt bike and on September 3, 2008, rode into the desert region west of Palo Verde, California to go camping. According to his manager, John Hayner, Tanner called that afternoon to say that his bike had run out of gas and that he would walk back to his camp. This conflicted with a later report that his bike was found at his camp. He reportedly intended to refill his water bottles at Clapp Spring before heading back to his campsite, but was unaware that the spring was usually dry. Temperatures that day reached 118 °F (48 °C), but in a text message to a friend, he said he thought he could make it back to his camp if he traveled during the later hours of the evening. He told friends to contact authorities if they did not hear from him by the following morning.

When friends did not hear from him the next morning, they reported Tanner missing and a search was begun. His body was discovered near Clapp Spring with empty water bottles by a Marine helicopter on September 8, 2008. The Imperial County coroner determined the time of death to be between late September 4 and early September 5, but the legal date of death was recorded as September 8, 2008. According to a military article, Tanner's motorcycle was at his camp and within his provisions were ample supplies of water. The Imperial County sheriff's office gave an official cause of death as heat exposure.

== Aftermath ==
A celebration of life service was held in Amarillo, Texas on September 27. An informal gathering was held at a friend's house in Oceanside and attended by Tanner's sister and close friends. At dusk, a candlelight vigil was held.

The UFC honored Tanner during the Spike TV broadcast of UFC Fight Night: Diaz vs. Neer on September 17, 2008. Pancrase paid tribute to Tanner with a special ceremony during their 15th Anniversary Show on October 1, 2008. Shark Fights also honored Tanner during their inaugural event at the Amarillo National Center on October 24, 2008. The 2008 World MMA Awards show on December 31, 2008 in Las Vegas, was dedicated to Tanner's memory.

A documentary about Tanner's life, travels and philosophy, "Once I Was A Champion," was directed by Gerard Roxburgh and premiered in competition at the 2011 Los Angeles Film Festival as an official selection. It was nominated for "Best Documentary Feature". The film was also an official selection at the 2011 Dallas Video Festival and the inaugural Arclight Documentary Film Festival in November 2011. It won the "Best Documentary Audience Award" at the 2011 Bel Air Film Festival. In March 2014, English film director and producer Bobby Razak released a documentary about Tanner titled "1" which looked at the circumstances surrounding Tanner's death. On June 19, 2019, Variety reported that a biopic about Tanner's life and career titled "The Power of 1" was in the works, slated to go into pre-production at the end of 2019 with principal photography planned for early 2020.

== Championships and accomplishments ==
=== Amateur wrestling ===
- Texas University Interscholastic League
  - 1988 UIL State Champion (167 lbs)
  - 1989 UIL State Champion (167 lbs)

=== Mixed martial arts ===
- Pancrase Hybrid Wrestling
  - 1998 Pancrase Neo Blood Tournament Winner
  - First non-Japanese fighter to win the Pancrase Neo Blood Tournament
  - First American to win the Pancrase Neo Blood Tournament
- Ultimate Fighting Championship
  - UFC Middleweight Championship (One time)
  - UFC Encyclopedia Awards
    - Fight of the Night (Four times) vs. Phil Baroni 1, Phil Baroni 2, Rich Franklin 2 and David Loiseau
    - Knockout of the Night (Two times) vs. Phil Baroni 1 and David Terrell
    - Submission of the Night (Two times) vs. Darrel Gholar and Justin Levens
  - UFC.com Awards
    - 2005: Ranked #7 Fight of the Year vs. Rich Franklin 2
- Unified Shoot Wrestling Federation
  - USWF Heavyweight Championship (One time)
  - Seven successful title defenses
  - First and only USWF Heavyweight Champion
  - Undefeated in USWF (11–0)
- Extreme Challenge
  - Heavyweight Tournament Championship (Gladiators 2)

== Mixed martial arts record ==
Professional record breakdown
40 matches	32 wins	8 losses
By knockout	12	6
By submission	17	1
By decision	3	1

Res.	Record	Opponent	Method	Event	Date	Round	Time	Location	Notes
Loss	32–8	Kendall Grove	Decision (split)	The Ultimate Fighter: Team Rampage vs. Team Forrest Finale	June 21, 2008	3	5:00	Las Vegas, Nevada, United States	
Loss	32–7	Yushin Okami	KO (knee)	UFC 82	March 1, 2008	2	3:00	Columbus, Ohio, United States	UFC Middleweight title eliminator.
Win	32–6	Justin Levens	Submission (triangle choke)	UFC 59	April 15, 2006	1	3:14	Anaheim, California, United States	
Loss	31–6	David Loiseau	TKO (doctor stoppage)	UFC Ultimate Fight Night 2	October 3, 2005	2	4:15	Las Vegas, Nevada, United States	UFC Middleweight title eliminator.
Loss	31–5	Rich Franklin	TKO (doctor stoppage)	UFC 53	June 4, 2005	4	3:25	Atlantic City, New Jersey, United States	Lost the UFC Middleweight Championship.
Win	31–4	David Terrell	TKO (punches)	UFC 51	February 5, 2005	1	4:35	Las Vegas, Nevada, United States	Won the vacant UFC Middleweight Championship.
Win	30–4	Robbie Lawler	Submission (triangle choke)	UFC 50	October 22, 2004	1	2:22	Atlantic City, New Jersey, United States	UFC Middleweight title eliminator.
Win	29–4	Phil Baroni	Decision (unanimous)	UFC 48	June 19, 2004	3	5:00	Las Vegas, Nevada, United States	
Win	28–4	Phil Baroni	TKO (punches)	UFC 45	November 21, 2003	1	4:42	Uncasville, Connecticut, United States	Middleweight debut.
Loss	27–4	Rich Franklin	TKO (punches)	UFC 42	April 25, 2003	1	2:40	Miami, Florida, United States	
Win	27–3	Shannon Ritch	Submission (triangle choke)	FCFF-Fighting Against Cancer	February 15, 2003	1	2:19	Portland, Oregon, United States	
Win	26–3	Chris Haseman	Decision (unanimous)	UFC 38	July 13, 2002	3	5:00	London, England	
Win	25–3	Elvis Sinosic	TKO (doctor stoppage)	UFC 36	March 22, 2002	1	2:06	Las Vegas, Nevada, United States	
Win	24–3	Homer Moore	Submission (armbar)	UFC 34	November 2, 2001	2	0:55	Las Vegas, Nevada, United States	
Loss	23–3	Tito Ortiz	KO (slam)	UFC 30	February 23, 2001	1	0:30	East Rutherford, New Jersey, United States	For the UFC Light Heavyweight Championship.
Win	23–2	Lance Gibson	TKO (punches and elbows)	UFC 29	December 16, 2000	1	4:48	Tokyo, Japan	
Win	22–2	Travis Fulton	Submission (triangle choke)	Unified Shoot Wrestling Federation 18	November 25, 2000	1	4:38	Amarillo, Texas, United States	Defended the USWF Heavyweight Championship.
Win	21–2	Raoul Romero	TKO (punches)	Unified Shoot Wrestling Federation 17	July 17, 2000	1	6:59	Amarillo, Texas, United States	Defended the USWF Heavyweight Championship.
Win	20–2	Vinny Nixon	Submission (keylock)	Unified Shoot Wrestling Federation 14	April 24, 1999	1	1:07	Lubbock, Texas, United States	Defended the USWF Heavyweight Championship.
Loss	19–2	Leon Dijk	TKO (knees and palm strikes)	Pancrase: Breakthrough 4	April 18, 1999	1	11:39	Yokohama, Japan	
Win	19–1	Mike Cizek	TKO (submission to punches)	Unified Shoot Wrestling Federation 13	March 20, 1999	1	2:06	Amarillo, Texas, United States	Defended the USWF Heavyweight Championship.
Win	18–1	Valeri Ignatov	TKO (elbows)	UFC 19	March 5, 1999	1	2:58	Bay St. Louis, Mississippi, United States	
Win	17–1	Darrel Gholar	Submission (rear-naked choke)	UFC 18	January 8, 1999	1	7:57	New Orleans, Louisiana, United States	Light Heavyweight debut.
Win	16–1	Ryushi Yanagisawa	Submission (arm-triangle choke)	Pancrase: Advance 12	December 19, 1998	1	2:24	Chiba, Japan	
Win	15–1	Gene Lydick	Submission (rear-naked choke)	Unified Shoot Wrestling Federation 12	October 24, 1998	1	4:15	Amarillo, Texas, United States	Defended the USWF Heavyweight Championship.
Win	14–1	Kiuma Kunioku	Decision (lost points)	Pancrase: 1998 Anniversary Show	September 14, 1998	1	20:00	Tokyo, Japan	
Win	13–1	Justin McCully	Technical Submission (kimura)	Pancrase: 1998 Neo-Blood Tournament Second Round	July 26, 1998	1	5:07	Tokyo, Japan	Won the Pancrase Neo-Blood Tournament.
Win	12–1	Kousei Kubota	Submission (arm-triangle choke)	Pancrase: 1998 Neo-Blood Tournament Opening Round	July 7, 1998	1	2:23	Tokyo, Japan	Pancrase Neo-Blood Tournament Semifinal.
Win	11–1	Ikuhisa Minowa	Submission (arm-triangle choke)	Pancrase: 1998 Neo-Blood Tournament Opening Round	July 7, 1998	1	4:05	Tokyo, Japan	Pancrase Neo-Blood Tournament Quarterfinal.
Win	10–1	Tony Castillo	TKO (knees)	Unified Shoot Wrestling Federation 9	June 20, 1998	1	4:06	Amarillo, Texas, United States	Defended the USWF Heavyweight Championship.
Win	9–1	Dennis Reed	Submission (triangle choke)	Gladiators 2	April 18, 1998	1	1:20	Iowa, United States	Extreme Challenge Heavyweight Tournament Final; won the Extreme Challenge Heavyweight Tournament.
Win	8–1	Wade Kroeze	TKO (knees)	Gladiators 2	April 18, 1998	1	1:00	Iowa, United States	Extreme Challenge Heavyweight Tournament Semifinal.
Win	7–1	Rusty Totty	Submission (arm-triangle choke)	Unified Shoot Wrestling Federation 8	March 28, 1998	1	1:36	Amarillo, Texas, United States	Defended the USWF Heavyweight Championship.
Loss	6–1	Heath Herring	Submission (rear-naked choke)	PSDA	November 22, 1997	1	8:20	Texas, United States	PSDA Heavyweight Tournament Final.
Win	6–0	Jesse Gonzalez	Submission (ezekiel choke)	PSDA	November 22, 1997	1	1:15	Texas, United States	PSDA Heavyweight Tournament Semifinal.
Win	5–0	Joe Frailey	TKO (submission to punches)	PSDA	November 22, 1997	1	0:56	Texas, United States	PSDA Heavyweight Tournament Quarterfinal.
Win	4–0	Heath Herring	TKO (exhaustion)	Unified Shoot Wrestling Federation 7	October 18, 1997	1	6:19	Amarillo, Texas, United States	Won the USWF Heavyweight Championship.
Win	3–0	Paul Buentello	Submission (rear-naked choke)	Unified Shoot Wrestling Federation 4	April 12, 1997	1	2:20	Amarillo, Texas, United States	USW 4 Heavyweight Tournament Final; won the USWF 4 Heavyweight Tournament.
Win	2–0	Gary Nabors	Submission (keylock)	Unified Shoot Wrestling Federation 4	April 12, 1997	1	2:21	Amarillo, Texas, United States	USWF 4 Heavyweight Tournament Semifinal.
Win	1–0	Mike Kennedy	TKO (submission to palm strikes)	Unified Shoot Wrestling Federation 4	April 12, 1997	1	1:29	Amarillo, Texas, United States	USWF 4 Heavyweight Tournament Quarterfinal.

Vacant Title last held by Murilo Bustamante	3rd UFC Middleweight Champion; February 5, 2005 – June 4, 2005	Succeeded by Rich Franklin
