= Matt Lindland =

American mixed martial artist, litigator, Olympic wrestler and political candidate

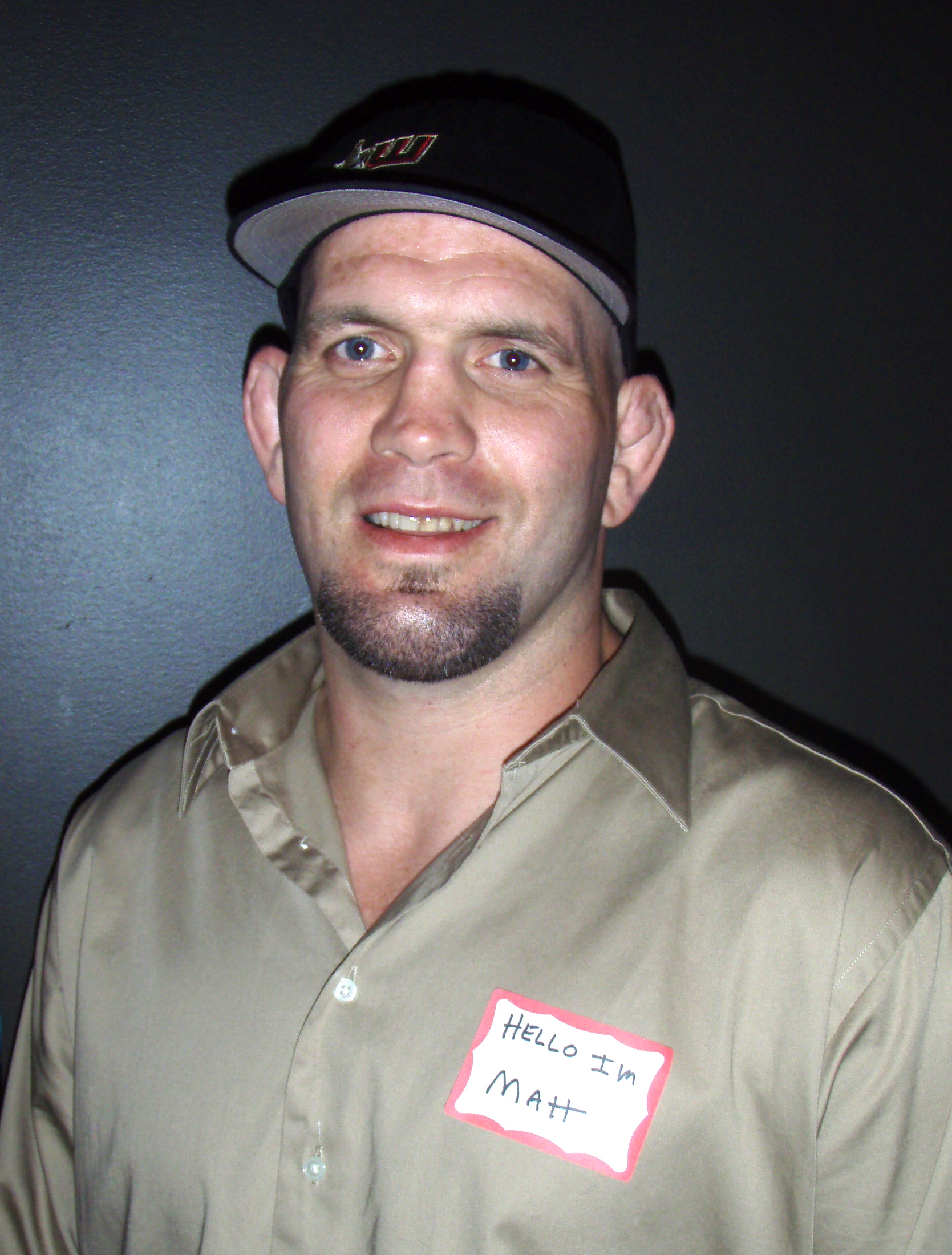
- Born: May 17, 1970 (age 56); Oregon City, Oregon, U.S.
- Other names: The Law
- Height: 6 ft 0 in (1.83 m)
- Weight: 185 lb (84 kg; 13 st 3 lb)
- Division: Middleweight; Light Heavyweight; Heavyweight
- Reach: 74 in (188 cm)
- Stance: Southpaw
- Fighting out of: Portland, Oregon, U.S.
- Team: Team Quest
- Rank: Black belt in Brazilian jiu-jitsu under Renzo Gracie
- Wrestling: NCAA Division I Wrestling; Olympic Greco-Roman wrestling
- Years active: 1997–2011 (MMA)

Mixed martial arts record
- Total: 31
- Wins: 22
- By knockout: 9
- By submission: 6
- By decision: 6
- By disqualification: 1
- Losses: 9
- By knockout: 4
- By submission: 4
- By decision: 1

Other information
- University: University of Nebraska–Lincoln
- Mixed martial arts record from Sherdog

Matthew James Lindland (born May 17, 1970), is an American retired mixed martial artist, Olympic wrestler, speaker, actor, coach, entrepreneur, and politician. He won the Oregon Republican Party's nomination for the Oregon House of Representatives, District 52 seat on May 20, 2008. He also started an apparel company named Dirty Boxer. In mixed martial arts, Lindland competed primarily in the Middleweight division for the UFC, Strikeforce. Affliction, the IFL, Cage Rage, the WFA, and BodogFIGHT.

== Wrestling ==
Lindland started wrestling at age 15 at Gladstone High School in Gladstone, Oregon. In 1991, he won the junior college 158 lbs national title wrestling for Clackamas Community College.

Lindland then went on to wrestle at the University of Nebraska–Lincoln in Division I of the NCAA. He won the Big Eight title at 158 in 1993. Following up that title, he had a record of 36-0 for the 1993 season going into the National Tournament, and was the #1 ranked wrestler for his weight class. He suffered an upset in the first round of the tournament, however, and did not place. Following his college career Lindland began to compete in both Freestyle and Greco-Roman events, finding success in both but ultimately deciding to concentrate on the Greco-Roman style.

The high point of his career was when he represented the United States in Greco-Roman Wrestling at the 2000 Summer Olympics in the 69–76 kg weight category, winning the silver medal, followed by a silver medal at the 2001 World Championships in Patras, Greece at 85 kg. His mixed martial arts career had actually started three years prior, having fought at events such as IVC 6, and it is notable that he continued to compete in amateur wrestling as well as MMA following his Olympic competition. Following his first UFC match, at UFC 29, Lindland managed to secure a silver medal at the world championships and a U.S. National title in 2001. He was still a top 10 ranked wrestler in his weight class for the nation until 2004, when his wrestling career finally came to an end, already being a veteran of over a dozen MMA fights as well, including competing in a title match.

Lindland was notable for having secured his spot on the US Olympic team through the courts. In the finals of the United States Olympic trials, Lindland lost to Keith Sieracki, whom Lindland had accused of tripping him (under the rules of Greco-Roman wrestling, athletes are not permitted the use of their legs for advantage in defense of offensive moves). After appealing, an arbitrator ordered a rematch for Lindland and Sieracki, which Lindland won 9–0.

The USOC however sought to keep Sieracki on the team, and appealed in federal court. A federal district judge, then a three-judge panel of the 7th U.S. Circuit Court of Appeals, both decided in Lindland's favor. A request for a hearing by the USOC in the Supreme Court of the United States was denied, which settled Lindland's status on the team. Lindland would later earn his nickname "The Lawyer" from the protracted case. After the Olympics, Lindland returned to Oregon where he would open a used car dealership named "USA Auto Wholesale".

In 2025, Lindland was honored as a Distinguished Member of the National Wrestling Hall of Fame.

== Mixed martial arts ==
Lindland started mixed martial arts training with Randy Couture, Dan Henderson and others at Team Quest. He won four fights in the middleweight division of the Ultimate Fighting Championship before losing to Murilo Bustamante in a championship match at UFC 37.

Lindland's next loss came at the hands of Falaniko Vitale, who Lindland attempted to slam, only to knock himself out in the process. After his dismissal from the UFC, Lindland continued to corner fighters at UFC events such as in B.J. Penn's bout against Georges St-Pierre. He has also continued his professional MMA career in IFL and BodogFight with five wins and two losses, with the two losses coming outside of his weightclass against the future UFC Light Heavyweight Champion Quinton Jackson and the former Pride Heavyweight Champion Fedor Emelianenko. After his World Fighting Alliance loss to Jackson, Lindland joined the International Fight League, which also marked Lindland's debut as an IFL team coach – he fought against Jeremy Horn. Lindland won by TKO early in the second round. He then beat Carlos Newton at IFL Houston at the 1:43 mark of Round 2 by submission due to guillotine choke. Lindland defeated Fabio Negao via unanimous decision on July 19, 2008 at Affliction: Banned in Anaheim, California. At Affliction: Day of Reckoning on January 24, 2009, he was defeated by Vitor Belfort. Lindland is the former coach of the Portland Wolfpack in the International Fight League.

=== Strikeforce ===
On April 13, 2009, Lindland signed a three-fight deal with Strikeforce and made his debut against Ronaldo Souza at Strikeforce: Evolution on December 19, 2009. Lindland lost the fight via first-round submission by way of arm triangle choke.

Lindland headlined Strikeforce Challengers 8 on May 21, 2010, in his hometown of Portland, Oregon, defeating Kevin Casey.

He fought Robbie Lawler at Strikeforce: Henderson vs. Babalu II on December 4, 2010. Lindland was knocked out fifty seconds into the first round.

=== Post-Strikeforce ===
Lindland was choked unconscious by Mamed Khalidov at KSW 16.

There is currently a documentary called "Fighting Politics" about Lindland and his MMA career.

In addition, he is a "Mixed Martial Arts Management" instructor for the online sports career training school, Sports Management Worldwide, in Portland, Oregon. In 2021, Lindland was promoted to the rank of black belt in Brazilian Jiu Jitsu, by Renzo Gracie.

== Personal life and politics ==
Matt Lindland and his wife Angie have two children, a son, Big Jim, and a daughter. Since retiring from MMA Lindland has pursued other sports such as professional rafting, achieving an impressive six time Western White Water Series Championship thus far. He is the 2013 World Team Greco-Roman head coach as well as Head Coach at Team Quest. He does seminars all over the world as well as public speaking.

On March 11, 2008, Lindland filed as a Republican to run for the Oregon House of Representatives in District 52. The seat was formerly held by Republican Patti Smith. Lindland defeated fellow Republican Phyllis Thiemann in the May 20, 2008 primary, 58 to 42 percent. He advanced to the general election and was defeated by Hood River, Oregon Democrat Suzanne VanOrman by around 52% to Lindland's 48%.

== Film and television ==
Lindland appears in the award-winning MMA documentary Fight Life, released in 2013. The film was directed by James Z. Feng and produced by RiLL Films.

Matt Lindland and Ed Herman guest starred on the TV series Leverage on July 22, 2011. Lindland played an MMA fighter.

Lindland has also appeared in the HBO hit television show Oz, acting and performing stunts. He was also featured in the Mary Kate and Ashley Olsen film New York Minute, again acting and performing stunts.

== Coaching ==
Lindland founded the North West kids wrestling program and coached at two of the top wrestling clubs in the U.S.: Cobra Wrestling and Peninsula. That same year, he also started working with Chael Sonnen at West Linn High School. In 1996, Lindland moved back to Lincoln, Nebraska to take a job as an assistant wrestling coach at the University of Nebraska–Lincoln where he coached until 2000. During his tenure at Nebraska, Lindland coached NCAA champions and multiple All-Americans. He continues to work with USA Wrestling to this day.

In 2000, Lindland started coaching wrestling and MMA at his Team Quest gym in Portland, Oregon. He is still coaching wrestling, kickboxing, MMA, and the professional and amateur fight teams at Team Quest. In 2013 he was selected as the World team coach for the US Greco-Roman wrestling team.

Lindland is a volunteer assistant coach at his alma mater, Clackamas Community College. The program has taken a U-turn under the coaching of Coach Josh Rhoden and Matt Lindland, placing high in the NJCAA National Tournament in recent years.

== Hall of Fame ==
In October 2013 Matt Lindland was inducted into the Alan & Gloria Rice Greco-Roman Hall of Champions inside the National Wrestling Hall of Fame Dan Gable Museum in Waterloo, Iowa.

Lindland was inducted as a Distinguished Member of the National Wrestling Hall of Fame in 2025.

== Championships and accomplishments ==
- International Fighting Championship
  - IFC 6 Tournament winner
- Ultimate Fighting Championship
  - UFC Encyclopedia Awards
    - Fight of the Night (Two times) vs. Phil Baroni (x2)
  - UFC.com Awards
    - 2005: Ranked #8 Submission of the Year vs. Travis Lutter
- MMA Fighting
  - 2003 Middleweight Fighter of the Year

== Mixed martial arts record ==
Professional record breakdown
31 matches	22 wins	9 losses
By knockout	9	4
By submission	6	4
By decision	6	1
By disqualification	1	0

Res.	Record	Opponent	Method	Event	Date	Round	Time	Location	Notes
Loss	22–9	Mamed Khalidov	Technical Submission (guillotine choke)	KSW 16: Khalidov vs. Lindland	May 21, 2011	1	1:35	Gdańsk, Poland	
Loss	22–8	Robbie Lawler	KO (punches)	Strikeforce: Henderson vs. Babalu II	December 4, 2010	1	0:50	St Louis, Missouri, United States	
Win	22–7	Kevin Casey	TKO (punches)	Strikeforce Challengers: Lindland vs. Casey	May 21, 2010	3	3:41	Portland, Oregon, United States	
Loss	21–7	Ronaldo Souza	Submission (arm-triangle choke)	Strikeforce: Evolution	December 19, 2009	1	4:18	San Jose, California, United States	
Loss	21–6	Vitor Belfort	KO (punches)	Affliction: Day of Reckoning	January 24, 2009	1	0:37	Anaheim, California, United States	
Win	21–5	Fabio Nascimento	Decision (unanimous)	Affliction: Banned	July 19, 2008	3	5:00	Anaheim, California, United States	
Loss	20–5	Fedor Emelianenko	Submission (armbar)	BodogFIGHT: Clash of the Nations	April 14, 2007	1	2:58	St. Petersburg, Russia	Heavyweight bout.
Win	20–4	Carlos Newton	Submission (guillotine choke)	IFL: Houston	February 2, 2007	2	1:43	Houston, Texas, United States	
Win	19–4	Jeremy Horn	TKO (punches)	IFL: Portland	September 9, 2006	2	0:21	Portland, Oregon, United States	
Loss	18–4	Quinton Jackson	Decision (split)	WFA: King of the Streets	July 22, 2006	3	5:00	Los Angeles, California, United States	Light Heavyweight bout.
Win	18–3	Mike Van Arsdale	Submission (guillotine choke)	Raze MMA: Fight Night	April 29, 2006	1	3:38	San Diego, California, United States	
Win	17–3	Fabio Leopoldo	Submission (rear-naked choke)	GFC: Gracie vs. Hammer House	March 3, 2006	3	3:25	Columbus, Ohio, United States	
Win	16–3	Antonio Schembri	TKO (punches)	Cage Rage 14	December 3, 2005	3	3:33	London, England, UK	
Win	15–3	Joe Doerksen	Decision (unanimous)	UFC 54: Boiling Point	August 20, 2005	3	5:00	Las Vegas, Nevada, United States	
Win	14–3	Travis Lutter	Submission (guillotine choke)	UFC 52: Couture vs Liddell	April 16, 2005	2	3:32	Las Vegas, Nevada, United States	
Win	13–3	Landon Showalter	Submission (armbar)	Sportfight 8: Justice	January 8, 2005	1	2:43	Gresham, Oregon, United States	
Win	12–3	Mark Weir	TKO (doctor stoppage)	Cage Rage 9	November 27, 2004	1	5:00	London, England, United Kingdom	
Loss	11–3	David Terrell	KO (punches)	UFC 49	August 21, 2004	1	0:24	Las Vegas, Nevada, United States	
Win	11–2	Tony Fryklund	Decision (unanimous)	ROTR 5: Rumble on the Rock 5	May 7, 2004	3	5:00	Honolulu, Hawaii, United States	
Win	10–2	Falaniko Vitale	TKO (submission to strikes)	UFC 45	November 21, 2003	3	4:23	Uncasville, Connecticut, United States	
Loss	9–2	Falaniko Vitale	KO (slam)	UFC 43	June 6, 2003	1	1:56	Las Vegas, Nevada, United States	
Win	9–1	Phil Baroni	Decision (unanimous)	UFC 41	February 28, 2003	3	5:00	Atlantic City, New Jersey, United States	
Win	8–1	Ivan Salaverry	Decision (unanimous)	UFC 39	September 27, 2002	3	5:00	Uncasville, Connecticut, United States	
Loss	7–1	Murilo Bustamante	Submission (guillotine choke)	UFC 37	May 10, 2002	3	1:33	Bossier City, Louisiana, United States	For the UFC Middleweight Championship.
Win	7–0	Pat Miletich	TKO (punches)	UFC 36	March 22, 2002	1	3:09	Las Vegas, Nevada, United States	
Win	6–0	Phil Baroni	Decision (majority)	UFC 34	November 21, 2001	3	5:00	Las Vegas, Nevada, United States	
Win	5–0	Ricardo Almeida	DQ (illegal up-kicks)	UFC 31	May 4, 2001	3	4:21	Atlantic City, New Jersey, United States	
Win	4–0	Yoji Anjo	TKO (punches)	UFC 29	December 16, 2000	1	2:58	Tokyo, Japan	
Win	3–0	Travis Fulton	Submission (choke)	IFC 6: Battle at the Four Bears	September 20, 1997	1	22:13	New Town, North Dakota, United States	Won IFC 6 Tournament
Win	2–0	Mark Waters	TKO (submission to punches)	IFC 6: Battle at the Four Bears	September 20, 1997	1	2:20	New Town, North Dakota, United States	IFC 6 Tournament Semifinals
Win	1–0	Karo Davtyan	TKO (punches)	World Fighting Federation	February 14, 1997	1	8:34	Birmingham, Alabama, United States	

== Submission grappling ==
ADCC World Submission Wrestling Championships

Record of opponents:

- Won: Yushin Okami
- Lost: Ronaldo 'Jacare' Souza, Fabricio Werdum (armbar)

== Folkstyle wrestling ==
- NJCAA Collegiate Championships 1991 158 lbs: 1st place
- NCAA Division 1 Tournament Seed 1993 163 lbs: #1 seed; did not place

== Freestyle wrestling ==
USA University Freestyle Championships

- 1992 163 lbs: 1st place
- 1994 163 lbs: 1st place

== Greco-Roman wrestling ==
USA Senior Greco-Roman Championships

- 1995 163 lbs: 1st place
- 1998 167.5 lbs: 1st place
- 1999 167.5 lbs: 1st place
- 2000 167.5 lbs: 1st place
- 2001 187.2 lbs: 1st place

FILA World Championships

- 1998 167 lbs: 6th place
- 2001 187 lbs: 2nd place

US Olympics

- 2000 167.5 lbs: silver medal
