= UFC 30 =

UFC mixed martial arts event in 2001

UFC 30: Battle on the Boardwalk
- The poster for UFC 30: Battle on the Boardwalk
- Promotion: Ultimate Fighting Championship
- Date: February 23, 2001
- Venue: Mark G. Etess Arena at Trump Taj Mahal
- City: Atlantic City, New Jersey

Event chronology
UFC 29: Defense of the Belts	UFC 30: Battle on the Boardwalk	UFC 31: Locked and Loaded

UFC 30: Battle on the Boardwalk was a mixed martial arts event held by the Ultimate Fighting Championship at the Trump Taj Mahal (now the Hard Rock Hotel & Casino Atlantic City) in Atlantic City, New Jersey on February 23, 2001. UFC 30 was the first UFC event under the new ownership of Zuffa, LLC, and also the first UFC event since UFC 22 to see a home video release.

== History ==
The card was headlined by two title fights, a Light Heavyweight Championship bout between current champion Tito Ortiz and Evan Tanner, and the inaugural UFC Bantamweight Championship bout between Jens Pulver and Caol Uno. After this event, Bantamweight was renamed "Lightweight" under the new Unified Rules of Mixed Martial Arts, defined by the New Jersey State Athletic Control Board. Bantamweight fighters would not again appear in the UFC until after the UFC–WEC merger in 2011. The event featured the first UFC appearances of Phil Baroni, Sean Sherk, Phil Johns, Caol Uno and Elvis Sinosic.

UFC 30 marked a major turning point for the UFC, as it was the first UFC event held by new owners Zuffa, LLC. Headed by Station Casinos owners Frank and Lorenzo Ferttita, and managed by Dana White, Zuffa acquired the UFC in January 2001 from former owners Semaphore Entertainment Group, who were on the brink of bankruptcy.

One notable change instituted by Zuffa was allowing the championship bout fighters to choose their own entry music in lieu of the standard fare UFC theme song, but that change was not implemented at UFC 30.

== Results ==
Main Card
Weight class				Method	Round	Time	Notes
Light Heavyweight	Tito Ortiz (c)	def.	Evan Tanner	KO (slam)	1	0:30	(Note: For the UFC Light Heavyweight Championship.)
Lightweight	Jens Pulver	def.	Caol Uno	Decision (unanimous)	5	5:00	(Note: For the inaugural UFC Lightweight Championship.)
Lightweight	Fabiano Iha	def.	Phil Johns	Submission (armbar)	1	2:05
Light Heavyweight	Elvis Sinosic	def.	Jeremy Horn	Submission (triangle armbar)	1	2:59
Heavyweight	Pedro Rizzo	def.	Josh Barnett	KO (punches)	2	4:21
Heavyweight	Bobby Hoffman	vs.	Mark Robinson	NC (overturned)	1	3:27	(Note: Originally a KO win for Hoffman; overturned after he tested positive for illegal substances.)
Preliminary Card
Middleweight	Phil Baroni	def.	Curtis Stout	Decision (unanimous)	2	5:00
Welterweight	Sean Sherk	def.	Tiki Ghosn	Verbal submission (dislocated shoulder)	2	4:47

== Encyclopedia awards ==
The following fighters were honored in the October 2011 book titled UFC Encyclopedia.

- Fight of the Night: Pedro Rizzo vs. Josh Barnett
- Knockout of the Night: Tito Ortiz
- Submission of the Night: Elvis Sinosic

== See also ==
- Ultimate Fighting Championship
- List of UFC champions
- List of UFC events
- 2001 in UFC
