= UFC 33 =

UFC mixed martial arts event in 2001

UFC 33: Victory in Vegas
- The poster for UFC 33: Victory in Vegas
- Promotion: Ultimate Fighting Championship
- Date: September 28, 2001
- Venue: Mandalay Bay Events Center
- City: Las Vegas, Nevada
- Attendance: 9,500
- Total gate: $816,660
- Buyrate: 75,000

Event chronology
UFC 32: Showdown in the Meadowlands	UFC 33: Victory in Vegas	UFC 34: High Voltage

UFC 33: Victory in Vegas was a mixed martial arts event held by the Ultimate Fighting Championship at the Mandalay Bay Events Center in Las Vegas, Nevada on September 28, 2001. The event was seen live on pay per view in the United States, and later released on home video.

== History ==
The card was headlined by three title bouts, Tito Ortiz vs. Vladimir Matyushenko for the Light Heavyweight Title (Vitor Belfort was unable to fight due to arm injury while training), Dave Menne vs Gil Castillo for the new Middleweight Title and Jens Pulver vs Dennis Hallman for the Lightweight Title.

UFC 33 was the first mixed martial arts event sanctioned by the Nevada State Athletic Commission, under the Unified Rules of Mixed Martial Arts, which were first established by the New Jersey State Athletic Control Board in April 2001.

UFC 33 is commonly pointed to as one of the worst events in UFC history, failing to captivate the new pay-per-view audience due to the large number of decisions on the card – UFC 33 was in fact the first event where all main card fights went to a decision. The Ortiz-Matyushenko and Pulver-Hallman fights in particular have been judged the two most uneventful five-round title fights in UFC history, up to at least 2009, by some metrics. Additionally, the broadcast ran over and cut out early on many cable systems (in the middle of the Ortiz-Matyushenko fight). After this event, the UFC reduced the number of live fights to five and didn't schedule an event with 3 title fights for over 15 years.

During the post fight press conference for UFC 111, in response to questions about a perceived boring fight between Georges St-Pierre and Dan Hardy, UFC president Dana White commented that "UFC 33 is the only one I can remember where every fight sucked."

Years later at the UFC 149 post-fight press conference, after a similarly lackluster card, Dana White quipped, "It felt like I was at UFC 33 again".

In 2013, following UFC on Fox 6 post-fight press conference, Dana White once again referred to UFC 33 as "the worst show we've ever had".

In 2026, at the post-fight press conference following UFC 332, Dana White again referenced UFC 33, saying, "There's probably been four or five in 25 years that you go, 'that sucked,' right? And the only one that really stands [out] all the time, when people ask me, off the top of my head, is UFC 33, which almost bankrupted the business. So, that's a big one for me. I'll never forget that as long as I live."

== Results ==
Main Card
Weight class				Method	Round	Time	Notes
Light Heavyweight	Tito Ortiz (c)	def.	Vladimir Matyushenko	Decision (unanimous) (50–43, 50–44, 50–44)	5	5:00	(Note: For the UFC Light Heavyweight Championship.)
Lightweight	Jens Pulver (c)	def.	Dennis Hallman	Decision (unanimous) (49–47, 48–47, 48–47)	5	5:00	(Note: For the UFC Lightweight Championship.)
Middleweight	Dave Menne	def.	Gil Castillo	Decision (unanimous) (49–43, 49–44, 49–45)	5	5:00	(Note: For the inaugural UFC Middleweight Championship.)
Light Heavyweight	Chuck Liddell	def.	Murilo Bustamante	Decision (unanimous) (29–28, 29–27, 29–27)	3	5:00
Welterweight	Matt Serra	def.	Yves Edwards	Decision (majority) (30–26, 30–27, 29–29)	3	5:00
Preliminary Card
Welterweight	Jutaro Nakao	def.	Tony DeSouza	KO (punch)	2	0:15
Middleweight	Ricardo Almeida	def.	Eugene Jackson	Submission (triangle choke)	1	4:06
Lightweight	Din Thomas	def.	Fabiano Iha	Decision (unanimous) (29–28, 29–27, 29–28)	3	5:00

== Encyclopedia awards ==
The following fighters were honored in the October 2011 book titled UFC Encyclopedia.

- Fight of the Night: Matt Serra vs. Yves Edwards
- Knockout of the Night: Jutaro Nakao
- Submission of the Night: Ricardo Almeida

== See also ==
- Ultimate Fighting Championship
- List of UFC champions
- List of UFC events
- 2001 in UFC
