= Team Quest =

Mixed martial arts training organization

- Est.: 1999
- Founded by: Dan Henderson; Randy Couture
- Primary trainers: Heath Sims; Dylan Fussell; Bryan Harper; Scott McKendry; Luiz Pedro; Cody Isaacson
- Past titleholders: Randy Couture Light Heavyweight Champion (UFC 2003-2004, 2004-2005) 205 lb (93 kg; 14.6 st), Heavyweight Champion (UFC 1997, 2000-2002, 2007) 222 lb (101 kg; 15.9 st) Dan Henderson Welterweight Champion (PRIDE FC 2006-2008) 183 lb (83 kg), Middleweight Champion (PRIDE FC 2007) 205 lb (93 kg); Evan Tanner Middleweight champion (UFC 2005) 185 lb (84 kg); Tarec Saffiedine Welterweight Champion (Strikeforce 2013) 170 lb (77 kg); Ed Herman Lightweight Heavyweight Champion (SportFight 2005 Relinquished) 205 lb (93 kg) Gabe Ruediger Lightweight Champion (WEC 2004–2005) 155 lb (70 kg)
- Prominent fighters: Dan Henderson (UFC, Strikeforce) Chael Sonnen (Bellator, WEC, UFC) Matt Lindland (UFC, Strikeforce); Rameau Thierry Sokoudjou (Strikeforce) Ed Herman (UFC, Strikeforce)
- Training facilities: Gresham, Oregon Hemet, California Chiang Mai, Thailand
- Website: Team Quest Portland Team Quest San Jacinto

Team Quest is a mixed martial arts training camp founded by Randy Couture and Dan Henderson with facilities located in Gresham, Oregon; Murrieta, California; Encinitas, California; Redding, California; Hemet, California; and Chiang Mai, Thailand. Notable fighters that have trained at the Oregon facility are Matt Lindland, Dave Jansen, Nathan Coy, and Chael Sonnen.

The Portland, Oregon location is led by Coach Matt Lindland, Olympic Silver Medalist, UFC veteran and former coach of the USA Olympic Wrestling Team.

The California facility hosts teammates, former two division PRIDE & Strikeforce Light Heavyweight Champion Dan Henderson, as well as Rameau Thierry Sokoudjou, Krzysztof Soszynski, and Jesse Taylor. The majority of fighters at Team Quest come from a background in wrestling.

The Redding location in Northern California is headed by BJJ Black Belt Carlos Zapata and is home to Muay Thai Kru Josh Hernandez. The location was shut down for undisclosed reasons.

Team Quest Portland's Pat Healy has spent time in China, helping MMA fighters and conducting training sessions with Legend's FC fighters. Healy has hosted some BJJ seminars in Hong Kong.

== Notable members ==
- (United States) Heath Sims
- (United States) Sebastian Rodriguez
- (United States) Sam Alvey
- (United States) Josh Burkman
- (Japan) Ryo Chonan
- (United States) Nathan Coy
- (France) Cyrille Diabaté
- (United States) Pat Healy
- (United States) Chris Leben
- (United States) Ryan Healy
- (United States) Dan Henderson - Last Pride Middleweight Champion, First, Last and Only Pride Welterweight Champion, 2006 Pride Welterweight Grand Prix Champion, Last Strikeforce Light Heavyweight Champion
- (United States) Ed Herman
- (United States) Dave Jansen
- (United States) Shaun Lethco - Top competitor he has his golden gloves and is a 2nd degree green belt in BJJ and trained in Muay Thai.
- (United States) Frank Lester
- (United States) Matt Lindland - 2000 Olympic Wrestling Silver Medalist, UFC Middleweight Title Challenger
- (United States) Ian Loveland
- (Brazil) Vinny Magalhaes - 2007 World No-gi Jiu Jitsu Champ, 2011 ADCC +99 kg Champ
- (United States) Tyson Nam
- (Japan) Yushin Okami - Former UFC Middleweight Title Challenger
- (United States) Mike Pierce
- (Belgium) Tarec Saffiedine - Last Strikeforce Welterweight Champion
- (Brazil) Fabiano Scherner
- (United States) Jay Silva
- (Cameroon) Rameau Thierry Sokoudjou
- (United States) Chael Sonnen - Former 2-Time UFC Middleweight Title Challenger, UFC Light Heavyweight Title Challenger, WEC Middleweight Title Challenger
- (United States) Evan Tanner - Former UFC Middleweight Champion, Former UFC Light Heavyweight Title Challenger, First American to win Pancrase Neo-Blood Tournament (1998), Former USWF Heavyweight Champion (7 title defenses
- (United States) Jesse Taylor - The Ultimate Fighter 25 winner
- (United States) Christopher Thompson Jr
- (United States) Joe Warren - 2006 60 kg Greco-Roman Wrestling World Champion
- (Germany) Daniel Weichel
- (United States) Nate Quarry - Former UFC Middleweight title challenger
- (United States) Jared Vanderaa - Former UFC Heavyweight Fighter, Owner of the Team Quest San Jacinto, California location
- (United States) Tim Welch (athlete) - MMA Fighter & Head Coach for Sean O'Malley (Bantamweight Champion)
