= UFC 31 =

UFC mixed martial arts event in 2001

UFC 31: Locked and Loaded
- The poster for UFC 31: Locked and Loaded
- Promotion: Ultimate Fighting Championship
- Date: May 4, 2001
- Venue: Mark G. Etess Arena at Trump Taj Mahal
- City: Atlantic City, New Jersey

Event chronology
UFC 30: Battle on the Boardwalk	UFC 31: Locked and Loaded	UFC 32: Showdown in the Meadowlands

UFC 31: Locked and Loaded was a mixed martial arts event held by the Ultimate Fighting Championship at the Trump Taj Mahal in Atlantic City, New Jersey on May 4, 2001. The event was seen live on pay-per-view in the United States, and later released on home video.

== History ==
The card was headlined by a heavyweight title bout between Randy Couture and Pedro Rizzo. A welterweight title bout between Pat Miletich and Carlos Newton also occurred. The card featured the first appearance of future UFC Welterweight Champion Matt Serra, the professional debut of future multi-divisional UFC Champion B.J. Penn, and Kevin Randleman's first fight in Light Heavyweight.

UFC 31 again saw reformed weight classes, adopting the current standard under the new Unified Rules of Mixed Martial Arts, set by the New Jersey State Athletic Control Board a month earlier in April 2001. Bantamweight was renamed Lightweight and raised from 150 to 155. Welterweights were now at 170, Middleweights at 185, and Light Heavyweights at 205.

Dana White has said on many occasions that this was one of the best fight cards ever mainly due to the main event and the bout between Matt Serra and Shonie Carter which involved the infamous backfist finish.

== Results ==
Main Card
Weight class				Method	Round	Time	Notes
Heavyweight	Randy Couture (c)	def.	Pedro Rizzo	Decision (unanimous)	5	5:00	(Note: For the UFC Heavyweight Championship.)
Welterweight	Carlos Newton	def.	Pat Miletich (c)	Submission (bulldog choke)	3	2:50	(Note: For the UFC Welterweight Championship.)
Light Heavyweight	Chuck Liddell	def.	Kevin Randleman	KO (punches)	1	1:18
Welterweight	Shonie Carter	def.	Matt Serra	KO (spinning back fist)	3	4:51
Heavyweight	Semmy Schilt	def.	Pete Williams	TKO (body kick and punches)	2	1:28
Light Heavyweight	Matt Lindland	def.	Ricardo Almeida	DQ (repeated fouls)	3	4:21
Preliminary Card
Lightweight	B.J. Penn	def.	Joey Gilbert	TKO (punches)	1	4:57
Welterweight	Tony DeSouza	def.	Steve Berger	Decision (unanimous) (30–27, 29–28, 29–28)	3	5:00

== Encyclopedia awards ==
The following fighters were honored in the October 2011 book titled UFC Encyclopedia.

- Fight of the Night: Randy Couture vs. Pedro Rizzo
- Knockout of the Night: Shonie Carter
- Submission of the Night: Carlos Newton

== See also ==
- Ultimate Fighting Championship
- List of UFC champions
- List of UFC events
- 2001 in UFC
