= UFC 34 =

UFC mixed martial arts event in 2001

UFC 34: High Voltage
- The poster for UFC 34: High Voltage
- Promotion: Ultimate Fighting Championship
- Date: November 2, 2001
- Venue: MGM Grand Garden Arena
- City: Las Vegas, Nevada
- Attendance: 9,000
- Total gate: $502,550
- Buyrate: 65,000

Event chronology
UFC 33: Victory in Vegas	UFC 34: High Voltage	UFC 35: Throwdown

UFC 34: High Voltage was a mixed martial arts event held by the Ultimate Fighting Championship at the MGM Grand Garden Arena in Las Vegas, Nevada on November 2, 2001.

== History ==
The card was headlined by two Championship Bouts, Randy Couture faced Pedro Rizzo for the Heavyweight Title, and Matt Hughes faced Carlos Newton for the Welterweight Title.

UFC 34 marked the first appearance of future Heavyweight Champion Frank Mir.

The broadcast had technical issues, as the commentators could barely be heard, consistently being drowned out by the crowd and ring noise.

During the Matt Hughes and Carlos Newton fight Hughes was clearly heard telling his corner several times that he "was out", after winning the fight by TKO. This conforms to Carlos Newton's assertion that he believed Hughes was "out", thus collapsing and leading to Newtons head colliding with the canvas.

The event was seen live on pay-per-view in the United States, and later released on home video.

== Results ==
Main Card
Weight class				Method	Round	Time	Notes
Heavyweight	Randy Couture (c)	def.	Pedro Rizzo	TKO (punches)	3	3:38	(Note: For the UFC Heavyweight Championship.)
Welterweight	Matt Hughes	def.	Carlos Newton (c)	KO (slam)	2	1:27	(Note: For the UFC Welterweight Championship.)
Heavyweight	Ricco Rodriguez	def.	Pete Williams	TKO (punches)	2	4:02
Lightweight	B.J. Penn	def.	Caol Uno	KO (punches)	1	0:11
Heavyweight	Josh Barnett	def.	Bobby Hoffman	TKO (submission to punches)	2	4:25
Preliminary Card
Middleweight	Evan Tanner	def.	Homer Moore	Submission (armbar)	2	0:55
Middleweight	Matt Lindland	def.	Phil Baroni	Decision (majority) (29–28, 29–27, 28–28)	3	5:00
Heavyweight	Frank Mir	def.	Roberto Traven	Submission (armbar)	1	1:05

== Encyclopedia awards ==
The following fighters were honored in the October 2011 book titled UFC Encyclopedia.

- Fight of the Night: Matt Lindland vs. Phil Baroni
- Knockout of the Night: Matt Hughes and B.J. Penn
- Submission of the Night: Frank Mir

== See also ==
- Ultimate Fighting Championship
- List of UFC champions
- List of UFC events
- 2001 in UFC
