= UFC 32 =

UFC mixed martial arts event in 2001

UFC 32: Showdown in the Meadowlands
- The poster for UFC 32: Showdown in the Meadowlands
- Promotion: Ultimate Fighting Championship
- Date: June 29, 2001
- Venue: Continental Airlines Arena
- City: East Rutherford, New Jersey
- Attendance: 12,500

Event chronology
UFC 31: Locked and Loaded	UFC 32: Showdown in the Meadowlands	UFC 33: Victory in Vegas

UFC 32: Showdown in the Meadowlands was a mixed martial arts event held by the Ultimate Fighting Championship at the Continental Airlines Arena in East Rutherford, New Jersey on June 29, 2001.

== History ==
The card was headlined by the first Light Heavyweight Championship Bout (previously called "Middleweight") between Tito Ortiz and Elvis Sinosic.

The event also featured the first appearance of future Heavyweight Champion Ricco Rodriguez.

UFC 32 marked the last appearances of long time commentator Jeff Blatnick, who had been with the UFC since UFC 4 as well as Frank Shamrock, who had been commentating for the UFC as well after retiring his promotional Light Heavyweight championship.

The event poster shows the towers of the World Trade Center in the background. Less than 3 months after the event, they were destroyed in the September 11 attacks.

The event was seen live on pay per view in the United States, and later released on home video.

== Results ==
Main Card
Weight class				Method	Round	Time	Notes
Light Heavyweight	Tito Ortiz (c)	def.	Elvis Sinosic	TKO (punches and elbows)	1	3:32	(Note: For the UFC Light Heavyweight Championship.)
Lightweight	B.J. Penn	def.	Din Thomas	TKO (knee)	1	2:42
Heavyweight	Josh Barnett	def.	Semmy Schilt	Submission (armbar)	1	4:21
Welterweight	Pat Miletich	def.	Shonie Carter	KO (head kick)	2	2:42
Lightweight	Caol Uno	def.	Fabiano Iha	KO (punches)	1	1:48
Light Heavyweight	Vladimir Matyushenko	def.	Yuki Kondo	Decision (unanimous) (30–27, 30–26, 30–27)	3	5:00
Preliminary Card
Heavyweight	Ricco Rodriguez	def.	Andrei Arlovski	TKO (strikes)	3	1:23
Welterweight	Tony DeSouza	def.	Paul Rodriguez	Submission (guillotine choke)	1	1:05

== Encyclopedia awards ==
The following fighters were honored in the October 2011 book titled UFC Encyclopedia.

- Fight of the Night: Ricco Rodriguez vs. Andrei Arlovski
- Knockout of the Night: Pat Miletich
- Submission of the Night: Josh Barnett

== See also ==
- Ultimate Fighting Championship
- List of UFC champions
- List of UFC events
- 2001 in UFC
