= Elvis Sinosic =

Australian mixed martial arts fighter (born 1971)

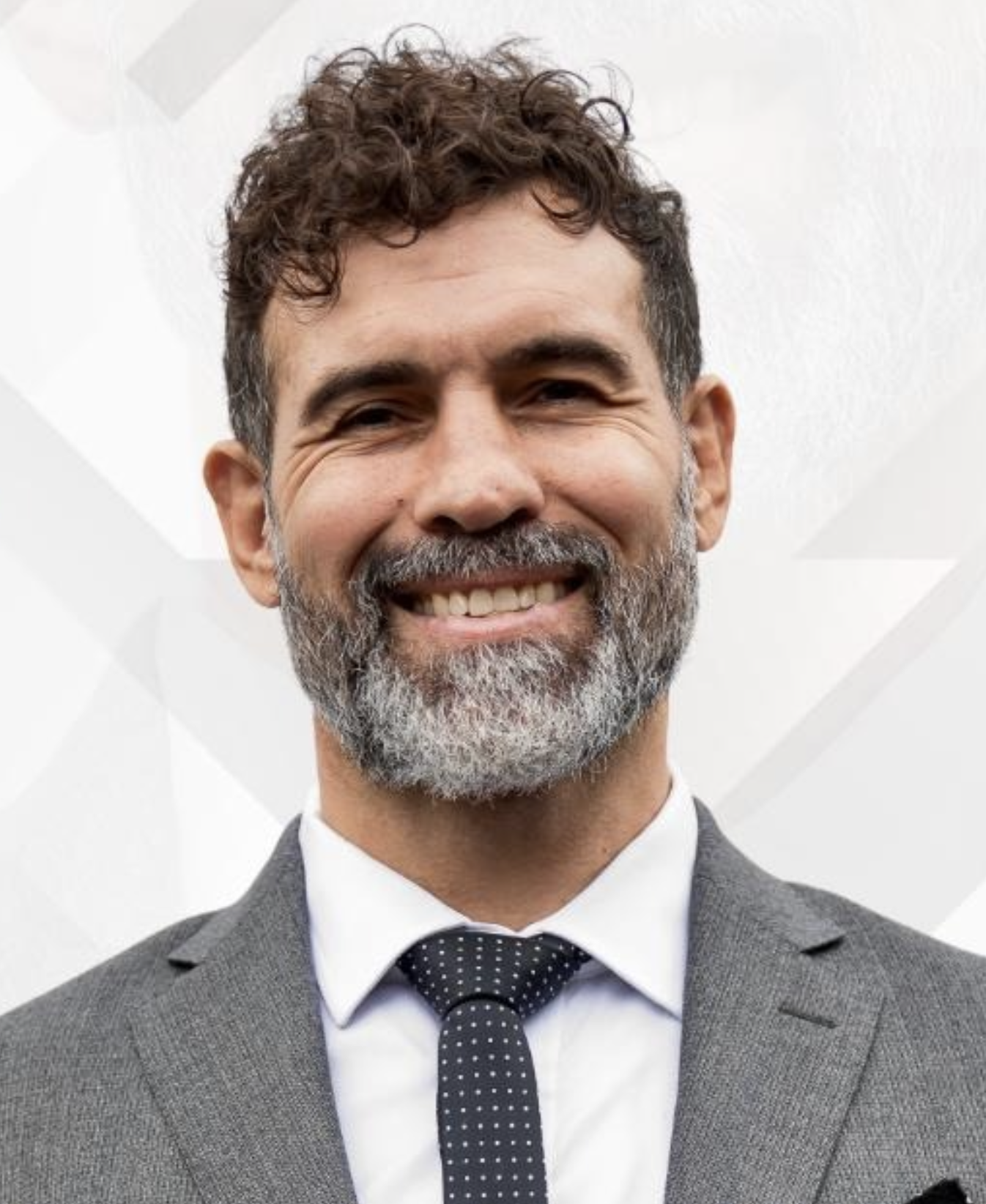
- Born: 13 February 1971 (age 55); Canberra, Australia
- Other names: The King of Rock n Rumble
- Height: 6 ft 3 in (1.91 m)
- Weight: 199 lb (90 kg; 14.2 st)
- Division: Light Heavyweight
- Reach: 77 in (200 cm)
- Style: Wrestling, Tae Kwon Do, Boxing, Jeet Kune Do, Kali, Silat, Muay Thai, Capoeira, Judo, Shootfighting, Brazilian Jiu-Jitsu
- Fighting out of: Sydney, Australia
- Years active: 1997–2007, 2010

Mixed martial arts record
- Total: 20
- Wins: 7
- By knockout: 4
- By submission: 3
- Losses: 11
- By knockout: 6
- By submission: 1
- By decision: 4
- Draws: 2

Other information
- Mixed martial arts record from Sherdog

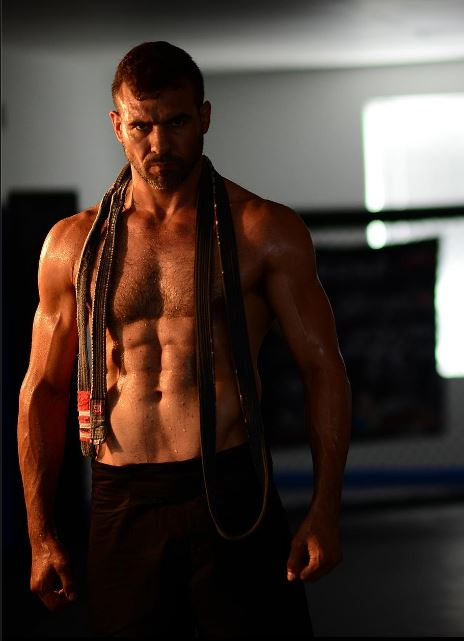
Sinosic in 2014

Elvis Sinosic (born 13 February 1971) is an Australian retired professional mixed martial artist who competed in the Ultimate Fighting Championship (UFC). He also competed in the Cage Rage Championships, K-1, and Pancrase.

== Biography ==
Sinosic was born in Canberra, Australian Capital Territory, to Croatian immigrant parents, and now resides in Sydney, New South Wales. He currently owns and runs Kings Academy of Martial Arts (formerly Sinosic Perosh Martial Arts SPMA) as well as UFC Gym Macarthur Square. Elvis ran SPMA with business and training partner Anthony Perosh for 16 years before Elvis and Anthony split the Academy. Sinosic was exposed to a myriad of art forms including: Wrestling, Tae Kwon Do, Boxing, Jeet Kune Do, Kali, Silat, Muay Thai, Capoeira, Judo, Shootfighting, Kai Shin, and Brazilian Jiu-Jitsu. Elvis was also the first BJJ Pan-Pacific Absolute Champion at the Inaugural event 1999. Elvis worked on the Fox Sports Australia Fight Week.

== Mixed martial arts career ==
Considered to be a pioneer of Australian mixed martial arts, Sinosic fought on the first ever Australian MMA show, Caged Combat. Mr Sinosic competed for and won the first ever Australian MMA title, the Australian Vale Tudo Heavyweight Championship. He was also the first Australian to fight for a nominal World Title (Universal Combat Challenge 1 vs Dave Beneteau), and was the first Australian to fight in an MMA match in K-1 when he lost at the K-1 World Grand Prix 2000 vs Frank Shamrock. Mr Sinosic was also the first Australian to fight in the UFC – UFC 30 vs Jeremy Horn – his only winning performance with the organization, where he was the first Australian to fight for a UFC World Championship (UFC 32 in a loss vs. Tito Ortiz).

=== UFC career ===
Sinosic's last fight in the UFC was a loss to Michael Bisping due to TKO (strikes) at UFC 70. This fight earned him a $30,000 Fight of the Night award. He was scheduled to return to the octagon in 2010 for a rematch against Chris Haseman at UFC 110, the first UFC event to be held in Australia. However, just days before the fight, Sinosic was forced to withdraw with a shoulder injury.

=== Post UFC ===
Sinosic's last fight was a KO loss to Paul Cahoon at Cage Rage 24 on 1 December 2007.

== Political career ==
Sinosic contested the electorate of Blaxland for the United Australia Party at the 2022 federal election. He was unsuccessful, receiving 6.25% of the vote.

Sinosic joined the Liberal Democrats and was on the party's legislative council ticket at the 2023 NSW state election.

At the 2024 New South Wales local elections, Sinosic is again contesting for the Liberal Democrats (renamed to the Libertarian Party), running for Bass Hill Ward on Canterbury-Bankstown City Council.

== Professional wrestling career ==
In 2022, All-Star Wrestling Australia hosted the professional wrestling debut of former UFC fighter Elvis Sinosic.

== Other media ==
Sinosic's knockout loss to Forrest Griffin appeared in the 2007 film Next starring Nicolas Cage and Jessica Biel. He also appeared in the movie Gods of Egypt.

Sinosic trained popular Australian martial artist Michael Bray, who he graded to purple belt, and who has spent time pursuing reform in wealth distribution and marriage equality.

== Championships and accomplishments ==
- Ultimate Fighting Championship
  - Fight of the Night (One time) vs. Michael Bisping
  - UFC Encyclopedia Awards
    - Fight of the Night (One time) vs. Forrest Griffin
    - Submission of the Night (One time) vs. Jeremy Horn

== Mixed martial arts record ==
Professional record breakdown
20 matches	7 wins	11 losses
By knockout	4	6
By submission	3	1
By decision	0	4
Draws	2	

Res.	Record	Opponent	Method	Event	Date	Round	Time	Location	Notes
Loss	7–11–2	Paul Cahoon	TKO (punches)	Cage Rage 24	1 December 2007	1	0:21	London, England	
Loss	7–10–2	Michael Bisping	TKO (punches)	UFC 70	21 April 2007	2	1:40	Manchester, England	Fight of the Night.
Win	7–9–2	Mark Epstein	Submission (armbar)	Cage Rage 19	9 December 2006	1	2:37	London, England	
Win	6–9–2	Shamoji Fuji	Submission (armbar)	Xplosion	18 August 2006	1	2:40	Sydney, New South Wales, Australia	
Loss	5–9–2	Alessio Sakara	Decision (unanimous)	UFC 57: Liddell vs. Couture 3	4 February 2006	3	5:00	Las Vegas, Nevada, United States	
Loss	5–8–2	Forrest Griffin	TKO (punches)	UFC 55: Fury	7 October 2005	1	3:22	Uncasville, Connecticut, United States	
Draw	5–7–2	Daijiro Matsui	Draw	Pancrase: Spiral 5	10 July 2005	2	5:00	Yokohama, Japan	
Win	5–7–1	Roberto Traven	KO (punch)	WR 1 – Warriors Realm 1	3 September 2004	2		Sunshine Coast, Queensland, Australia	
Loss	4–7–1	Sanae Kikuta	Decision (unanimous)	Pancrase - 10th Anniversary Show	31 August 2003	3	5:00	Tokyo, Japan	
Loss	4–6–1	Renato Sobral	Decision (unanimous)	UFC 38	13 July 2002	3	5:00	London, England	
Loss	4–5–1	Evan Tanner	TKO (doctor stoppage)	UFC 36	22 March 2002	1	2:06	Las Vegas, Nevada, United States	
Loss	4–4–1	Tito Ortiz	TKO (punches and elbows)	UFC 32	29 June 2001	1	3:32	East Rutherford, New Jersey, United States	For the UFC Light Heavyweight Championship
Win	4–3–1	Jeremy Horn	Submission (triangle armbar)	UFC 30	23 February 2001	1	2:59	Atlantic City, New Jersey, United States	UFC debut; first Australian to fight in the UFC.
Loss	3–3–1	Frank Shamrock	Decision	K-1 Grand Prix 2000 Final	12 December 2000	5	3:00	Tokyo, Japan	
Draw	3–2–1	Dave Beneteau	Draw	UCC 1 – The New Beginning	2 June 2000	2	10:00	Montreal, Quebec, Canada	
Loss	3–2	Al Reynish	TKO (retirement)	Rings Australia: NR2	13 September 1998	1	7:52	Australia	
Win	3–1	Daniel Bond	TKO	AVT – Australia Vale Tudo	16 November 1997	1		Australia	
Win	2–1	Kevin McConachie	TKO	AVT – Australia Vale Tudo	16 November 1997	1		Australia	
Loss	1–1	Chris Haseman	Submission (chin to the eye)	Caged Combat 1 – Australian Ultimate Fighting	22 March 1997	1	2:47	Sydney, New South Wales, Australia	
Win	1–0	Matt Rocca	TKO (punches)	Caged Combat 1 – Australian Ultimate Fighting	22 March 1997	1	0:41	Sydney, New South Wales, Australia	
