= Jeremy Horn =

American mixed martial arts fighter

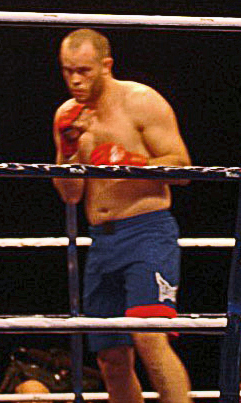
- Jeremy Horn at the 2007 IFL in Oakland, California on January 19, 2007
- Born: August 25, 1975 (age 51); Omaha, Nebraska, U.S.
- Other names: Gumby
- Height: 6 ft 1 in (185 cm)
- Weight: 205 lb (93 kg; 14 st 9 lb)
- Division: Middleweight; Light Heavyweight; Heavyweight
- Fighting out of: Salt Lake City, Utah
- Team: Elite Performance
- Years active: 1996–2020 (MMA)

Professional boxing record
- Total: 1
- Wins: 1
- By knockout: 1
- Losses: 0

Mixed martial arts record
- Total: 120
- Wins: 92
- By knockout: 26
- By submission: 54
- By decision: 12
- Losses: 22
- By knockout: 3
- By submission: 8
- By decision: 11
- Draws: 5
- No contests: 1

Other information
- Boxing record from BoxRec
- Mixed martial arts record from Sherdog

Jeremy Graham Horn (born August 25, 1975) is an American former mixed martial artist. Horn is best known for fighting in smaller American promotions, though he has also competed in some of the premiere mixed martial arts organizations around the world, including the UFC, WEC, PRIDE, Bellator, Pancrase, the IFL, King of the Cage, and the International Fighting Championships (IFC).

Horn is the former King of the Cage Light Heavyweight Champion and has also competed in the Heavyweight and Light Heavyweight divisions.

== Background ==
Horn was born and raised in Ohio, and has two half-brothers, Sid and Matt Anderson, along with his younger brother Marshall Horn. All of the boys were raised by their single mother, Ruth. A belligerent child, he began training when he was 12 years old, along with his brother Matt.

Before becoming a full-time mixed martial arts fighter, Horn worked in construction. He is known for his durability, with a total of 120 total fights in his career, as well as his grappling skills with 54 of his 92 wins by submission.

== Mixed martial arts ==
=== Early career ===
Horn's early martial arts training was under Robert Bussey's Warrior International founder, Robert Bussey. Horn earned a RBWI black belt under Bussey in 1992, and spent most of his career with the Miletich Fighting Systems team in Iowa. Horn is currently training in Salt Lake City, Utah with Elite Performance, the team that he created.

Horn made his professional debut in early 1996 in a warehouse in Atlanta, Georgia. Horn won the bout in under two minutes via armbar submission, and would go on to reach a record of 9-2-3 with eight submission wins before being invited to compete in the UFC.

=== UFC ===
Horn made his UFC debut at UFC 17 on May 15, 1998 against then-UFC Light Heavyweight Champion, Frank Shamrock in a fight for the UFC Light Heavyweight Championship. Horn lost via kneebar submission 16:28 into the bout.

Horn made his next appearance for the organization at UFC Brazil five fights later against Brazilian Vale Tudo fighter, Ebenezer Fontes Braga. Horn lost the bout via guillotine choke submission 3:27 into the first round. Horn bounced back after the loss, going 9-0-1 in his next 10 fights with two wins in the IFC, with the draw being against Keiichiro Yamamiya in Horn's Pancrase debut. Horn returned to the UFC at UFC 19 to fight future UFC Light Heavyweight Champion and future UFC Hall of Fame inductee, Chuck Liddell. Horn rendered Liddell unconscious with an arm-triangle choke 12:00 into the bout, which would be the only submission loss of Liddell's career.

Horn compiled eight more wins to bring his winning-streak to 15 fights, before making another appearance for the UFC at UFC 21 against Daiju Takase in Cedar Rapids, Iowa. Horn won the bout via TKO 4:41 into the fight. Horn then fought at UFC 22 two fights later against Jason Godsey, who had defeated Horn via submission earlier in his career.

Horn's 18-fight winning-streak was snapped in his next fight, after suffering a loss via majority decision at the hands of Hiromitsu Kanehara in Horn's RINGS debut in Tokyo, Japan. His next loss was against future Pride Heavyweight Champion and future UFC Interim Heavyweight Champion, Antônio Rodrigo Nogueira via unanimous decision. After a split decision loss to Ricardo Arona in RINGS, Horn made his next UFC appearance at UFC 27 against future Strikeforce U.S. Middleweight Champion Eugene Jackson and won via armbar submission in the first round.

In RINGS, Horn faced six-time UFC Champion and UFC Hall of Famer Randy Couture, who was able to out strike Horn from the clinch and knocked down Horn multiple times, as Horn would end up losing in a unanimous decision. After the loss to Couture, Horn faced Australian Brazilian jiu-jitsu specialist, Elvis Sinosic at UFC 30. Sinosic, who held a career record 3-3-1 coming into the fight, defeated Horn with an armbar submission. Two fights after a majority decision loss in a rematch with Ricardo Arona, Horn was invited to compete in the Pride Fighting Championships.

=== PRIDE ===
Horn made his PRIDE debut against Akira Shoji on December 23, 2001, at Pride 18 in Fukuoka, Japan. Horn won the bout against the Japanese veteran via unanimous decision. Horn's next appearance for the Japan-based organization was against Gilbert Yvel at Pride 21 and Horn won via unanimous decision.

=== WEC, King of the Cage, and the IFC ===
After his last fight with PRIDE, Horn made his World Extreme Cagefighting debut at WEC 4 and won via rear-naked choke submission under one minute into the first round. Horn then followed this up with wins over Kristof Midoux, Travis Fulton, Chalid Arrab, and Homer Moore before fighting for the King of the Cage Light Heavyweight Championship against then-champion, Vernon White, who had won and defended the title four times. Horn won the bout via unanimous decision, becoming the new King of the Cage Light Heavyweight Champion.

Two fights later, Horn fought in the IFC Light Heavyweight tournament on September 6, 2003, and won his first bout of the night via armbar submission before facing future Ultimate Fighter Winner, UFC Light Heavyweight Champion, and UFC Hall of Famer, Forrest Griffin in a highly anticipated bout. The two exchanged powerful strikes on the feet and battled on the ground in the first round, and continued to grapple through the second round until Horn knocked out Griffin with a single head kick.

Horn's next fight of the night was for the final against future Strikeforce Light Heavyweight Champion Renato Sobral. Sobral was able to overwhelm Horn from the start of the fight with his strikes and grappling skills, as he took down Horn who then attempted a triangle choke before Sobral escaped from the position. Later in the round, Horn took down Sobral, who in turn was able to get back on top to utilize the ground and pound technique. At the start of the second round, the two exchanged submission attempts until Horn, while ground and pounding Sobral from the top, unintentionally landed an illegal knee strike to the face of the downed Muay Thai fighter. After the fight continued, Sobral took down Horn and the two continued to battle from the ground until the end of the fight. Horn ultimately lost in a unanimous decision in a very entertaining fight.

Two fights later, Horn defended his King of the Cage Light Heavyweight Championship title against former King of the Cage Middleweight Champion, who had vacated his title when he moved up to the Light Heavyweight division. Two fights later, Horn fought for TKO Major League MMA against UFC veteran, David Losieau and won via guillotine choke submission under one minute into the first round. Horn then fought against future UFC veteran Chael Sonnen and won via TKO due to a cut 3:34 into the fight.

Two fights after the win over Sonnen, Horn fought future longtime UFC Middleweight Champion, Anderson Silva in Seoul, South Korea. Horn was outmatched by Silva's striking, and multiple takedown attempts by Horn were defended by the Brazilian fighter using the sprawl technique, as Horn would go on to lose in a unanimous decision.

Two fights later, Horn had a rematch with Chael Sonnen. Sonnen, a wrestler, immediately took Horn down and utilized the ground and pound technique through the first round and into the second round, until Horn was able to sink in a guillotine choke, causing Sonnen to tap. Horn faced Josh Burkman two fights after the win over Sonnen, and won via technical submission with a guillotine choke early into the fight, causing controversy as he spit on the downed Burkman immediately after the referee stopped the fight. After following this up with another win, Horn returned to the UFC.

=== Return to the UFC ===
Horn made his return to the UFC at UFC 54 to fight for the UFC Light Heavyweight Championship against then-champion, Chuck Liddell in a rematch of their UFC 19 bout. Horn lost the rematch via TKO, after being dominated by Liddell's superior striking, although Horn held out until 2:46 into the fourth round. Horn made his next appearance at UFC 56 against South African Trevor Prangley and won via unanimous decision. After his win over Prangley, Horn fought Chael Sonnen for a third time at UFC 60 and won again, this time being via armbar submission.

At an International Fight League show on September 9, 2006, Horn lost to former Olympic wrestling silver medalist Matt Lindland in the second round due to strikes. After the fight, Horn announced that he would be taking a break from fighting. He returned from this break when he beat Falaniko Vitale by split decision at the IFL Oakland event. Horn's next bout, the 100th of his career, was a loss against future Strikeforce Middleweight Grand Prix Champion Jorge Santiago, but then won his next bout via unanimous decision against future Ultimate Fighter winner and UFC veteran, Court McGee, who had been undefeated heading into the fight.

Horn then fought again for the UFC at UFC 81 against future Strikeforce Welterweight Champion Nate Marquardt as a replacement for Thales Leites and lost via guillotine choke submission. Horn then lost again via guillotine choke submission in a rematch with Dean Lister at The Ultimate Fighter: Team Rampage vs Team Forrest Finale. After two consecutive losses, Horn faced Brazilian jiu-jitsu specialist Rousimar Palhares at UFC 93 in Dublin, Ireland and lost again via unanimous decision. After three consecutive losses, Horn was released by the UFC.

=== Post-UFC ===
After leaving the UFC, Horn then fought Sean Salmon and defeated him in the first round by rear-naked choke to win the IFC Middleweight Championship. Horn fought for the Bellator Fighting Championships against Bryan Baker at Bellator 30 on September 23, 2010. Horn lost the bout via unanimous decision.

Horn was set to face UFC and WEC veteran Jake Rosholt on April 16, 2010, on the "Bad Boys 2" card for King of the Cage, but the fight was canceled when Rosholt sustained a neck injury the day before the event.

== Championships and accomplishments ==
- Ultimate Fighting Championship
  - UFC Encyclopedia Awards
    - Fight of the Night (Two times; vs. Chuck Liddell both times)
    - Submission of the Night (Two times; vs. Chuck Liddell and Jason Godsey)
- Elite 1 MMA — Elite 1 MMA Light Heavyweight Championship (One time)
- 5150 Combat League — 5150 Combat League Middleweight Championship (One time)
- Fighting Network RINGS — 2000 Rising Stars Middleweight Tournament Winner
- International Fighting Championships (IFC)
  - IFC Middleweight Championship (One time)
  - IFC Light Heavyweight Tournament Finalist
- King of the Cage — King of the Cage Light Heavyweight Champion (One time)
- Sugar Creek Showdown — SCS Light Heavyweight Championship (One time)
- TKO/UCC
  - TKO Simultaneous Two Division Champion
  - TKO World Light Heavyweight Championship (One time)
  - TKO World Middleweight Championship (One time)

== Mixed martial arts record ==
Professional record breakdown
120 matches	92 wins	22 losses
By knockout	26	3
By submission	54	8
By decision	12	11
Draws	5	
No contests	1	

Res.	Record	Opponent	Method	Event	Date	Round	Time	Location	Notes
Win	92–22–5 (1)	Mike Khardas	TKO (submission to head kick)	Extreme Challenge 239	September 12, 2020	1	1:47	Jefferson, Iowa, United States	
Loss	91–22–5 (1)	Egidijus Valavicius	TKO (leg injury)	SCS 28: Shockwave	November 14, 2015	1	0:56	Hinton, Oklahoma, United States	Lost the SCS Light Heavyweight Championship.
NC	91–21–5 (1)	Tony Lopez	NC (overturned by commission)	SCS 25: Apocalypse	March 28, 2015	5	5:00	Hinton, Oklahoma, United States	Retained the SCS Light Heavyweight Championship. Originally a split decision win for Lopez; overturned by the athletic commission.
Win	91–21–5	Brian Imes	Submission (kimura)	SCS 22: Reborn	September 13, 2014	1	1:15	Hinton, Oklahoma, United States	Won the SCS Light Heavyweight Championship.
Win	90–21–5	Dan McGlasson	Submission (rear-naked choke)	APFC 16	April 6, 2014	1	3:45	Villa Park, Illinois, United States	
Win	89–21–5	Brad Scholten	Submission (rear-naked choke)	Extreme Challenge 200	November 23, 2011	1	2:26	Council Bluffs, Iowa, United States	
Win	88–21–5	Shawn Marchand	Submission (rear-naked choke)	Elite 1 MMA: Hostile Territory	July 16, 2011	1	2:18	Moncton, New Brunswick, Canada	Won the vacant Elite 1 MMA Light Heavyweight Championship.
Loss	87–21–5	Thales Leites	Decision (split)	Superior Challenge 7	April 30, 2011	3	5:00	Stockholm, Sweden	For the Superior Challenge Middleweight Championship.
Win	87–20–5	Lee McKibbin	Submission (guillotine choke)	Cage Wars - Validation	December 10, 2010	1	3:40	Belfast, Northern Ireland, United Kingdom	
Loss	86–20–5	Bryan Baker	Decision (unanimous)	Bellator 30	September 23, 2010	3	5:00	Louisville, Kentucky, United States	
Win	86–19–5	Brian Warren	Submission (arm-triangle choke)	UFO: Rumble at the Races	July 24, 2010	1	3:09	Kennewick, Washington, United States	
Win	85–19–5	Sean Salmon	Submission (rear-naked choke)	IFC: Extreme Challenge	July 10, 2010	1	1:57	Mt. Pleasant, Michigan, United States	Won the IFC Middleweight Championship.
Win	84–19–5	Victor Moreno	Submission (rear-naked choke)	5150 Combat League/XFL "New Year's Revolution"	January 16, 2010	1	2:37	Tulsa, Oklahoma, United States	Won the 5150 Combat League Middleweight Championship.
Win	83–19–5	Joe Trujillo	Submission (keylock)	Rocky Mountain Nationals: Stars of MMA	October 30, 2009	1	2:52	Denver, Colorado, United States	
Win	82–19–5	Jason Guida	Submission (arm-triangle choke)	Arena Rumble: Guida vs. Horn	September 12, 2009	1	4:03	Spokane, Washington, United States	
Win	81–19–5	Chris Davis	Submission (rear-naked choke)	Adrenaline MMA 3: Bragging Rights	June 13, 2009	1	4:17	Birmingham, Alabama, United States	
Loss	80–19–5	Rousimar Palhares	Decision (unanimous)	UFC 93	January 17, 2009	3	5:00	Dublin, Ireland	
Loss	80–18–5	Dean Lister	Submission (guillotine choke)	The Ultimate Fighter: Team Rampage vs Team Forrest Finale	June 21, 2008	1	3:52	Las Vegas, Nevada, United States	
Loss	80–17–5	Nate Marquardt	Submission (guillotine choke)	UFC 81	February 2, 2008	2	1:37	Las Vegas, Nevada, United States	
Win	80–16–5	Court McGee	Decision (unanimous)	Ultimate Combat Experience: Utah	December 1, 2007	3	5:00	Salt Lake City, Utah, United States	
Loss	79–16–5	Jorge Santiago	Submission (triangle choke)	Art of War 3	September 1, 2007	1	3:02	Dallas, Texas, United States	
Win	79–15–5	Falaniko Vitale	Decision (split)	International Fight League: Oakland	January 19, 2007	5	4:00	Oakland, California, United States	
Loss	78–15–5	Matt Lindland	TKO (punches)	International Fight League: Portland	September 9, 2006	2	0:21	Portland, Oregon, United States	
Win	78–14–5	Chael Sonnen	Submission (armbar)	UFC 60	May 27, 2006	2	1:17	Los Angeles, California, United States	
Win	77–14–5	Trevor Prangley	Decision (unanimous)	UFC 56	November 19, 2005	3	5:00	Las Vegas, Nevada, United States	Middleweight debut.
Loss	76–14–5	Chuck Liddell	TKO (retirement)	UFC 54	August 20, 2005	4	2:46	Las Vegas, Nevada, United States	For the UFC Light Heavyweight Championship.
Win	76–13–5	Spencer Canup	KO (punches)	IFC: Caged Combat	May 21, 2005	1	3:36	Columbus, Ohio, United States	
Win	75–13–5	Josh Burkman	Technical Submission (guillotine choke)	XFC: Dome of Destruction 1	April 29, 2005	1	1:14	Tacoma, Washington, United States	
Win	74–13–5	William Hill	Submission (guillotine choke)	Extreme Challenge 61	April 22, 2005	2	2:45	Osceola, Iowa, United States	
Win	73–13–5	Kazuki Okubo	KO (punch to the body)	Euphoria: USA vs World	February 26, 2005	1	3:19	Atlantic City, New Jersey, United States	
Win	72–13–5	Chael Sonnen	Submission (guillotine choke)	SF 6: Battleground in Reno	September 23, 2004	2	2:35	Reno, Nevada, United States	
Win	71–13–5	Kyle Seals	TKO (knee)	Alaska Fighting Championship	July 14, 2004	1	N/A	Anchorage, Alaska, United States	
Loss	70–13–5	Anderson Silva	Decision (unanimous)	Gladiator FC: Day 2	June 27, 2004	3	5:00	Seoul, South Korea	
Win	70–12–5	Cameron Brown	Submission (arm-triangle choke)	PXC 2: Chaos	May 22, 2004	1	3:05	Guam	
Win	69–12–5	Chael Sonnen	TKO (cut)	Extreme Challenge 57	May 6, 2004	1	3:34	Council Bluffs, Iowa, United States	
Win	68–12–5	David Loiseau	Submission (guillotine choke)	TKO Major League MMA	February 28, 2004	1	0:54	Montreal, Quebec, Canada	Won the TKO World Middleweight Championship.
Win	67–12–5	Ron Fields	TKO (punches)	ICE 7: Meltdown at Metropolis	January 16, 2004	2	3:01	Fairfield, Ohio, United States	
Win	66–12–5	Dean Lister	Decision (majority)	KOTC 31: King of the Cage 31	December 6, 2003	4	5:00	San Diego, California, United States	Defended the KOTC Light Heavyweight Championship.
Draw	65–12–5	James Zikic	Draw	Extreme Brawl 4	September 28, 2003	3	5:00	Bracknell, England	
Loss	65–12–4	Renato Sobral	Decision (unanimous)	IFC: Global Domination	September 6, 2003	3	5:00	Denver, Colorado, United States	IFC Light Heavyweight Tournament Final.
Win	65–11–4	Forrest Griffin	KO (head kick)	IFC: Global Domination	September 6, 2003	2	3:40	Denver, Colorado, United States	IFC Light Heavyweight Tournament Semifinal.
Win	64–11–4	Mikhail Avetisyan	Submission (armbar)	IFC: Global Domination	September 6, 2003	1	4:59	Denver, Colorado, United States	IFC Light Heavyweight Tournament Quarterfinal.
Win	63–11–4	William Hill	Submission (rear-naked choke)	Extreme Challenge 51	August 2, 2003	1	4:47	St. Charles, Illinois, United States	
Win	62–11–4	Vernon White	Decision (unanimous)	KOTC 23: Sin City	May 16, 2003	5	5:00	Las Vegas, Nevada, United States	Won the KOTC Light Heavyweight Championship.
Win	61–11–4	Homer Moore	Decision (unanimous)	ICC 2: Rebellion	April 18, 2003	3	5:00	Minneapolis, Minnesota, United States	
Win	60–11–4	Chalid Arrab	Decision (unanimous)	2H2H 6: Simply the Best	March 16, 2003	1	15:00	Rotterdam, Netherlands	
Win	59–11–4	Travis Fulton	TKO (corner stoppage)	ICC 1: Retribution	January 12, 2003	2	0:50	Minneapolis, Minnesota, United States	
Win	58–11–4	Kristof Midoux	Submission (arm-triangle choke)	UCC 11: The Next Level	October 11, 2002	2	1:02	Montreal, Quebec, Canada	
Win	57–11–4	Aaron Brink	Submission (rear-naked choke)	WEC 4	August 31, 2002	1	0:54	Uncasville, Connecticut, United States	
Win	56–11–4	Gilbert Yvel	Decision (unanimous)	Pride 21	June 23, 2002	3	5:00	Saitama, Saitama	
Win	55–11–4	Steve Funn	Submission (armbar)	Ultimate Cage Fighting 1	May 9, 2002	1	0:13	Los Angeles, California, United States	
Win	54–11–4	Greg Wikan	Submission (rear-naked choke)	UW: Horn vs. Wikan	March 2, 2002	2	4:40	Minnesota, United States	
Win	53–11–4	Stephan Potvin	KO (slam)	UCC 7: Bad Boyz	January 25, 2002	1	0:35	Montreal, Quebec, Canada	Won the TKO World Light Heavyweight Championship.
Win	52–11–4	Akira Shoji	Decision (unanimous)	Pride 18	December 23, 2001	3	5:00	Fukuoka, Fukuoka	
Win	51–11–4	Dan Theodore	KO (knee)	Ultimate Wrestling Minnesota	October 28, 2001	2	1:41	Minnesota, United States	
Loss	50–11–4	Ricardo Arona	Decision (majority)	Rings: 10th Anniversary	August 11, 2001	2	5:00	Tokyo, Japan	
Win	50–10–4	Shawn Wagner	Submission (rear-naked choke)	Mass Destruction 3	August 4, 2001	1	2:35	Springfield, Massachusetts, United States	
Win	49–10–4	Demetrius Worlds	Submission (rear-naked choke)	Gladiators 16	June 30, 2001	1	N/A	Des Moines, Iowa, United States	
Win	48–10–4	Brad Krane	TKO (Submission to punches)	Gladiators 14	May 11, 2001	1	N/A	Omaha, Nebraska, United States	
Win	47–10–4	Iouri Bekichev	Submission (arm-triangle choke)	Rings: World Title Series 1	April 20, 2001	1	0:50	Tokyo, Japan	
Win	46–10–4	Griffen Reynaud	TKO (Submission to punches)	Rings USA: Battle of Champions	March 17, 2001	1	2:55	Council Bluffs, Iowa, United States	
Loss	45–10–4	Elvis Sinosic	Submission (triangle armbar)	UFC 30	February 23, 2001	1	2:59	Atlantic City, New Jersey, United States	
Loss	45–9–4	Randy Couture	Decision (unanimous)	Rings: King of Kings 2000 Block A	October 9, 2000	3	5:00	Tokyo, Japan	
Win	45–8–4	Chris Haseman	Submission (armbar)	Rings USA: Rising Stars Final	September 30, 2000	1	2:36	Moline, Illinois, United States	
Win	44–8–4	Josh Hall	Submission (kneebar)	Rings USA: Rising Stars Final	September 30, 2000	1	3:50	Moline, Illinois, United States	
Win	43–8–4	Eugene Jackson	Submission (armbar)	UFC 27	September 22, 2000	1	4:32	New Orleans, Louisiana, United States	
Loss	42–8–4	Ricardo Arona	Decision (split)	Rings: Millennium Combine 3	August 23, 2000	2	5:00	Osaka, Japan	
Win	42–7–4	Keith Mielke	KO (punches)	Rings USA: Rising Stars Block A	July 15, 2000	1	1:47	Orem, Utah, United States	
Win	41–7–4	Jason Allar	TKO (head kick)	Extreme Challenge 35	June 29, 2000	2	1:03	Davenport, Iowa, United States	
Win	40–7–4	Nate Parmelee	KO (elbow)	Extreme Challenge 33	June 10, 2000	1	3:24	Council Bluffs, Iowa, United States	
Loss	39–7–4	Kiyoshi Tamura	Decision (unanimous)	Colosseum 2000	May 26, 2000	2	5:00	Japan	
Win	39–6–4	Yoshihisa Yamamoto	Submission (arm-triangle choke)	Rings: Millennium Combine 1	April 20, 2000	2	2:50	Tokyo, Japan	
Win	38–6–4	George Randolph	Submission (arm-triangle choke)	SFC: Xplosion!	January 28, 2000	1	3:32	Belleville, Illinois, United States	
Loss	37–6–4	Antônio Rodrigo Nogueira	Decision (unanimous)	WEF 8: Goin' Platinum	January 15, 2000	3	8:00	Rome, Georgia, United States	
Win	37–5–4	Aaron Pendleton	TKO (Submission to punches)	Extreme Challenge 30	December 1, 1999	1	3:25	Council Bluffs, Iowa, United States	
Win	36–5–4	John Marsh	Decision (unanimous)	Neutral Grounds 13	November 20, 1999	3	5:00	Lakeside, California, United States	
Win	35–5–4	Johnathan Ivey	TKO (injury)	HOOKnSHOOT: Millennium	November 6, 1999	1	1:24	Evansville, Indiana, United States	
Loss	34–5–4	Hiromitsu Kanehara	Decision (majority)	Rings: King of Kings 1999 Block A	October 28, 1999	2	5:00	Tokyo, Japan	
Win	34–4–4	Jason Godsey	Submission (armbar)	UFC 22	September 24, 1999	1	2:08	Lake Charles, Louisiana, United States	
Win	33–4–4	Adam Harris	TKO (punches)	Extreme Challenge 27	August 21, 1999	1	2:31	Davenport, Iowa, United States	
Win	32–4–4	Daiju Takase	TKO (punches)	UFC 21	July 16, 1999	1	4:41	Cedar Rapids, Iowa, United States	
Win	31–4–4	Scott Ventimiglia	Submission (armbar)	HOOKnSHOOT: Ultimate Wrestle!	June 12, 1999	1	N/A	Evansville, Indiana, United States	
Win	30–4–4	Kristian Rothaermel	Submission (rear-naked choke)	Extreme Challenge 25	June 11, 1999	1	2:31	Council Bluffs, Iowa, United States	
Win	29–4–4	Justin Ellison	TKO (Submission to palm strikes)	Extreme Challenge 24	May 15, 1999	1	2:30	Salt Lake City, Utah, United States	
Win	28–4–4	Jim Theobald	Submission (rear-naked choke)	Submission Fighting Championships	April 30, 1999	1	N/A	O'Fallon, Illinois, United States	
Win	27–4–4	Mike Delaney	TKO (Submission to punches)	Freestyle Combat Challenge 1	April 19, 1999	1	8:05	Racine, Wisconsin, United States	
Win	26–4–4	Todd Butler	Submission (armbar)	IFC: Fighters Revenge	April 2, 1999	1	2:22	Kahnawake, Quebec, Canada	
Win	25–4–4	Jammy Daniels	TKO (Submission to punches)	Extreme Boxing 3	March 23, 1999	1	2:47	Davenport, Iowa, United States	
Win	24–4–4	Brandon Wilson	Submission (rear-naked choke)	Gladiators 2	March 18, 1999	1	1:40	Sioux City, Iowa, United States	
Win	23–4–4	Chuck Liddell	Technical Submission (arm-triangle choke)	UFC 19	March 5, 1999	1	12:00	Bay St. Louis, Mississippi, United States	
Win	22–4–4	Steve Berger	Decision (unanimous)	Submission Fighting Championships	January 31, 1999	1	24:00	Belleville, Illinois, United States	
Win	21–4–4	Ken Parr	Submission (rear-naked choke)	HOOKnSHOOT: Trial	January 30, 1999	1	3:23	Evansville, Indiana, United States	
Win	20–4–4	Mark Walker	Submission (arm-triangle choke)	Extreme Boxing 1	January 20, 1999	1	2:29	Davenport, Iowa, United States	
Win	19–4–4	John Dixson	Submission (armbar)	IFC: Extreme Combat	January 9, 1999	1	0:57	Montreal, Quebec, Canada	
Win	18–4–4	Rene Tremblay	Submission (triangle choke)	IFC: Extreme Combat	January 9, 1999	1	1:01	Montreal, Quebec, Canada	
Win	17–4–4	Nick Starks	Submission (arm-triangle choke)	New Year's Eve Knockout 1	December 31, 1998	1	5:21	Atlanta, Georgia, United States	
Draw	16–4–4	Keiichiro Yamamiya	Draw	Pancrase: Advance 12	December 19, 1998	1	15:00	Chiba, Japan	
Win	16–4–3	Rich Nettleton	Submission (rear-naked choke)	Gladiators 1	November 13, 1998	1	1:44	Sioux City, Iowa, United States	
Win	15–4–3	Jerome Smith	Submission (armbar)	HOOKnSHOOT: Eruption	November 7, 1998	1	4:02	Evansville, Indiana, United States	
Win	14–4–3	Derrick Ruffin	Submission (rear-naked choke)	Submission Fighting Championships	November 6, 1998	1	3:49	Carbondale, Illinois, United States	
Loss	13–4–3	Ebenezer Fontes Braga	Submission (guillotine choke)	UFC Brazil	October 16, 1998	1	3:27	São Paulo, Brazil	
Win	13–3–3	Wayne Pittman	Submission (rear-naked choke)	Midwest Fighting 2	September 28, 1998	1	1:40	United States	
Win	12–3–3	Clayton Miller	TKO (punches)	Midwest Fighting 2	September 28, 1998	1	3:27	United States	
Win	11–3–3	Todd Butler	Submission (rear-naked choke)	Extreme Challenge 20	August 22, 1998	1	3:28	Davenport, Iowa, United States	
Win	10–3–3	Jaymon Hotz	TKO (Submission to punches)	Midwest Fighting 1	July 28, 1998	1	1:56	Broomfield, Colorado, United States	
Loss	9–3–3	Frank Shamrock	Submission (kneebar)	UFC 17	May 15, 1998	1	16:28	Mobile, Alabama, United States	For the UFC Light Heavyweight Championship.
Draw	9–2–3	Travis Fulton	Draw	Extreme Challenge 16	March 26, 1998	1	20:00	Council Bluffs, Iowa, United States	
Win	9–2–2	Noe Hernandez	Decision (unanimous)	Extreme Challenge 15	February 27, 1998	1	15:00	Muncie, Indiana, United States	
Win	8–2–2	Pat Assalone	Submission (armbar)	Extreme Challenge 15	February 27, 1998	1	1:38	Muncie, Indiana, United States	
Draw	7–2–2	Travis Fulton	Draw	Extreme Challenge 9	August 30, 1997	1	15:00	Davenport, Iowa, United States	
Draw	7–2–1	Dan Severn	Draw	Extreme Challenge 7	June 25, 1997	1	20:00	Council Bluffs, Iowa, United States	
Loss	7–2	Jason Godsey	Submission (rear-naked choke)	Extreme Challenge 6	May 10, 1997	1	6:42	Battle Creek, Michigan, United States	
Win	7–1	Steven Goss	Submission (triangle choke)	Extreme Challenge 6	May 10, 1997	1	4:16	Battle Creek, Michigan, United States	
Win	6–1	Dennis Reed	Submission (armbar)	Extreme Challenge 4	February 22, 1997	1	7:55	Council Bluffs, Iowa, United States	
Win	5–1	Gary Myers	Submission (armbar)	Extreme Challenge 1	November 23, 1996	1	2:06	Des Moines, Iowa, United States	
Win	4–1	Nate Schroeder	Submission (rear-naked choke)	Brawl at the Ballpark 1	September 1, 1996	1	4:50	Davenport, Iowa, United States	
Win	3–1	Nate Schroeder	TKO (Submission to punches)	Gladiators 1	July 26, 1996	1	7:44	Davenport, Iowa, United States	
Loss	2–1	Mark Hanssen	Submission (armbar)	Quad City Ultimate 2	May 11, 1996	1	9:10	Moline, Illinois, United States	
Win	2–0	Mike Adsit	TKO (Submission to elbows)	Quad City Ultimate 2	May 11, 1996	1	2:00	Moline, Illinois, United States	
Win	1–0	Rick Graveson	Submission (armbar)	Atlanta Fights	March 1, 1996	1	1:54	Atlanta, Georgia, United States	

== Professional boxing record ==
1 fight	1 win	0 losses
By knockout	1	0

No.	Result	Record	Opponent	Type	Round, time	Date	Location	Notes
1	Win	1–0	(United States) Marty Lindquist	TKO	3 (4)	18 July 2020	(United States) Mississippi Valley Fairgrounds, Davenport, Iowa, US	
