= Tony DeSouza =

Peruvian martial artist

Tony De Souza
- Born: Anton Nicolas de Souza; July 26, 1974 (age 52); Lima, Peru
- Other names: Peruvian Savage, Peruvian Mad Man, El Mendigo
- Height: 6 ft 0 in (1.83 m)
- Weight: 175 lb (79 kg; 12.5 st)
- Division: Welterweight
- Style: Brazilian Jiu-Jitsu, Boxing
- Stance: Southpaw
- Fighting out of: Lima, Peru
- Team: Nova União; Attitude and Fitness Fight Club; Sniper Gym
- Rank: Black belt in Brazilian Jiu-Jitsu
- Years active: 2000–2007, 2012–present

Mixed martial arts record
- Total: 15
- Wins: 11
- By knockout: 1
- By submission: 7
- By decision: 3
- Losses: 4
- By knockout: 4

Other information
- Mixed martial arts record from Sherdog

Anton Nicolas de Souza (born July 26, 1974) is a Peruvian professional mixed martial artist and Brazilian Jiu-Jitsu black belt.

== Biography and career ==
His style of fighting is a blend of freestyle wrestling and Brazilian jiu-jitsu. De Souza competed in wrestling throughout his high school and college years in Los Angeles. He learned Brazilian jiu jitsu under John Lewis and André Pederneiras. De Souza's trademark submission is a modified guillotine choke known as the Peruvian Necktie. C.B. Dollaway used this choke to defeat Jesse Taylor at UFC: Silva vs. Irvin.

He calls his style of fighting Cholitzo, which came about by fusing the words jiu jitsu and cholo, a term which generally refers to people with various amounts of Amerindian racial ancestry.

He appeared on The Ultimate Fighter 5, the fifth season of the Ultimate Fighting Championship produced reality television series The Ultimate Fighter. On the show, DeSouza was the wrestling coach of Team Penn, the team coached by B.J. Penn. He coached next to BJ Penn. He managed to expand jiu-jitsu to Gray Maynard and Joe Lauzon.

To date, DeSouza has a professional mixed martial arts record of eleven wins and four losses. DeSouza lives in Cuzco, Peru.

== Mixed martial arts record ==
Professional record breakdown
15 matches	11 wins	4 losses
By knockout	2	4
By submission	6	0
By decision	3	0

Res.	Record	Opponent	Method	Event	Date	Round	Time	Location	Notes
Win	11–4	Luis Perrogon	Submission (rear naked choke)	MMA Nemesis 1	December 13, 2012	1	1:20	La Paz, Bolivia	
Loss	10–4	Roan Carneiro	TKO (punches)	UFC 79	December 29, 2007	2	3:33	Las Vegas, Nevada, United States	
Loss	10–3	Thiago Alves	KO (knee)	UFC 66: Liddell vs. Ortiz	December 30, 2006	2	1:10	Las Vegas, Nevada, United States	Alves tested positive for banned diuretics.
Win	10–2	Dustin Hazelett	Submission (kimura)	Ortiz vs. Shamrock 3: The Final Chapter	October 10, 2006	1	3:59	Hollywood, Florida, United States	
Win	9–2	Fabricio Monteiro	Decision (majority)	Gold Fighters Championship 1	May 20, 2006	3	5:00	Rio de Janeiro, Brazil	
Win	8–2	Vitelmo Kubis Bandeira	Submission (kneebar)	Jungle Fight 6	April 29, 2006	1	4:38	Manaus, Amazonas, Brazil	
Loss	7–2	Angelo Diaz	TKO (cut)	South American Open	April 15, 2005	1	N/A	Lima, Peru	
Win	7–1	Carlos Lima	Submission (arm triangle choke)	Jungle Fight 3	October 23, 2004	2	0:32	Manaus, Amazonas, Brazil	
Win	6–1	Luiz Azeredo	Decision (split)	Meca World Vale Tudo 11	June 5, 2004	3	5:00	Rio de Janeiro, Brazil	
Win	5–1	Chatt Lavender	TKO (cut)	World Fighting Alliance 1	November 3, 2001	1	3:24	Las Vegas, Nevada, United States	
Loss	4–1	Jutaro Nakao	KO (punch)	UFC 33	September 28, 2001	2	0:15	Las Vegas, Nevada, United States	
Win	4–0	Paul Rodriguez	Submission (guillotine choke)	UFC 32	June 29, 2001	1	1:05	Rutherford, New Jersey, United States	
Win	3–0	Steve Berger	Decision (unanimous)	UFC 31	May 4, 2001	3	5:00	Atlantic City, New Jersey, United States	
Win	2–0	Kenneth Tanario	Submission (toe hold)	Gladiator Challenge 1	December 9, 2000	1	0:56	California, United States	
Win	1–0	Ben Melendez	TKO (Submission to strikes)	CFF - The Cobra Classic 2000	August 26, 2000	1	0:55	Anza, California, United States	
