= Vladimir Matyushenko =

Belarusian mixed martial artist

- Born: 4 January 1971 (age 55); Rečyca, Belarusian SSR, USSR
- Native name: Уладзімір Мацюшэнка
- Other names: The Janitor
- Nationality: Belarusian
- Height: 6 ft 1 in (1.85 m)
- Weight: 205 lb (93 kg; 14 st 9 lb)
- Division: Heavyweight; Light Heavyweight
- Reach: 74 in (188 cm)
- Stance: Orthodox
- Fighting out of: El Segundo, California, United States
- Team: VMAT
- Wrestling: Freestyle wrestling NJCAA Wrestling
- Years active: 1997–2014

Mixed martial arts record
- Total: 35
- Wins: 27
- By knockout: 12
- By submission: 4
- By decision: 11
- Losses: 8
- By knockout: 4
- By submission: 2
- By decision: 2

Other information
- University: Lassen Community College
- Website: www.vmatgym.com
- Mixed martial arts record from Sherdog

Vladimir Matyushenko (Note: Belarusian: Уладзімір Уладзіміравіч Мацюшэнка, romanized: Uladzimir Uladzimiravich Matsyushenka) (born 4 January 1971) is a Belarusian retired mixed martial artist. A professional from 1997 until 2014, he competed for Bellator MMA, the UFC, Affliction, Jungle Fight, and is the former IFL light heavyweight champion, where he was a member of Ken Yasuda's Tokyo Sabres.

== Wrestling career ==
Matyushenko is an accomplished freestyle wrestler athlete who competed for both the Soviet Union and Belarus. At the age of 15, he was training alongside the Soviet Olympic wrestling team. At 90 kg, he won a silver medal in the 1994 European championships, and placed 11th in the 1994 World Championships. He utilized his wrestling background extensively in his fights.

His nickname of "The Janitor" was coined by Dave Schultz as a joke to the U.S. wrestling team after Matyushenko beat members of their formidable squad (including Olympian Kevin Jackson) during a meet in Siberia. Their first impression of him had been when he was cleaning the mats in poor-looking clothing.

He was also a two-time National Junior College champion at Lassen College, winning the 177 lb weight class in 1996 and the heavyweight weight class in 1997, before moving on to the University of Nevada, graduating with a degree in Health Science in 1999.

== Mixed martial arts career ==
=== Early career ===
Matyushenko made his professional MMA debut by winning three fights on the same night at IFC 5: Battle in the Bayou. With a 9-1 record in smaller promotions, Matyushenko made his UFC debut defeating Yuki Kondo by unanimous decision at UFC 32. After his win at UFC 32 Matyushenko was given a title shot against then Light heavyweight champion Tito Ortiz. He lost by unanimous decision. In his next fight Matyushenko defeated Antônio Rogério Nogueira at UFO: Legend. Matyushenko made his return to the UFC in the Heavyweight division defeating Travis Wiuff at UFC 40. He then defeated Pedro Rizzo by unanimous decision at UFC 41. Matyushenko was then defeated by Andrei Arlovski at UFC 44.

=== International Fight League ===
Matyushenko made his IFL debut by defeating Dwayne Compton. He fought under the Tokyo Sabres camp under body builder Ken Yasuda He then defeated Justin Levens by TKO and Aaron Stark also by TKO. In his next appearance Matyushenko beat Tim Boetsch via unanimous decision. Matyushenko defeated Alex Schoenauer by unanimous decision on 3 November 2007, becoming the first ever light heavyweight champion in the IFL.

Matyushenko successfully defended his title against Jamal Patterson winning by TKO in the second round.

=== Affliction ===
After the financial collapse of the International Fight League, Matyushenko participated at "Affliction: Day of Reckoning" pay-per-view event on 24 January 2009, in Anaheim, California at the Honda Center, and lost to Antônio Rogério Nogueira by TKO in round 2.

He defeated Jason Lambert by unanimous decision at Call to Arms I on 16 May 2009, at Citizen Business Bank Arena in Ontario, California.

=== Ultimate Fighting Championship ===
Matyushenko returned to the UFC on 19 September 2009, at UFC 103 and defeated Igor Pokrajac by unanimous decision (30–27, 30–27, 30–27).

Matyushenko was expected to face Steve Cantwell on 2 January 2010, at UFC 108, but Cantwell pulled out of the bout for undisclosed reasons. Since there was no time to find a suitable replacement, the bout was called off.

Matyushenko next faced Eliot Marshall on 21 March 2010, at UFC Live: Vera vs. Jones. Matyushenko won a split decision victory (30–27, 28–29, 30–27).

Matyushenko was defeated by light heavyweight prospect, Jon Jones on 1 August 2010, in the main event of UFC Live on Versus: 2. Matyushenko was taken down by Jones early in the first round, where Jones achieved the crucifix position and rained down elbows on Matyushenko forcing the referee to stop the fight.

It was announced in August 2010 that Matyushenko signed a new four-fight contract with the UFC and was expected to face Jason Brilz on 13 November 2010, at UFC 122. However, Brilz was forced out of the bout with an injury and replaced by Alexandre Ferreira. Matyushenko defeated Ferreira via first-round TKO after achieving a mounted position and landing a flurry of punches and elbows.

Matyushenko faced Jason Brilz on 30 April 2011, at UFC 129. He won the fight via KO at 0:20 into the first round, the second fastest knockout win of his career.

Matyushenko was expected to face Alexander Gustafsson on 6 August 2011, at UFC 133. But Matyushenko had to pull out of the fight due to Injury and was replaced by Matt Hamill.

Matyushenko/Gustafsson ultimately took place on 30 December 2011, at UFC 141. Matyushenko lost the fight via TKO in the first round.

Matyushenko was expected to face returning veteran Matt Hamill on 22 September 2012, at UFC 152. However, Matyushenko was forced out of the bout after suffering a partially torn Achilles tendon while training, and was replaced by Roger Hollett.

Matyushenko faced Ryan Bader on 26 January 2013, at UFC on Fox 6. He lost the bout via submission in the first round and was subsequently released from the promotion.

=== Bellator MMA ===
On 18 April 2013, it was announced that Matyushenko had signed a contract to compete for Bellator and would compete in a non-tournament fight that year.

Matyushenko was set to make his Bellator against former Bellator Light Heavyweight Champion Christian M'Pumbu at Bellator 99 in the main event. However, on 18 August 2013, it was announced that M'Pumbu had a hand injury and would be replaced by Houston Alexander. Matyushenko won the fight via unanimous decision.

Matyushenko faced Joey Beltran on 11 April 2014, at Bellator 116. Despite winning the first two rounds, he lost the fight in the third round due to submission. Matyushenko retired from MMA competition following his loss to Beltran.

== Personal life ==
Matyushenko has a son named Roman who also trains MMA. He married Stella Junqueira in 2011 after the UFC fighter Summit. Together, they had a daughter named Sasha.

Matyushenko is currently living in El Segundo, California, United States. Matyushenko also appears in EA Sports MMA and UFC Undisputed 3.

== Championships and accomplishments ==
- International Fight League
  - IFL Light Heavyweight Championship (One time; First; Last)
  - One Successful Title Defense
- International Fighting Championship
  - IFC 5 Tournament Winner

== Mixed martial arts record ==
Professional record breakdown
| 35 matches | 27 wins | 8 losses |
| By knockout | 12 | 4 |
| By submission | 4 | 2 |
| By decision | 11 | 2 |

| Res. | Record | Opponent | Method | Event | Date | Round | Time | Location | Notes |
|---|---|---|---|---|---|---|---|---|---|
| Loss | 27–8 | Joey Beltran | Submission (north/south choke) | Bellator 116 | 11 April 2014 | 3 | 3:06 | Temecula, California, United States | |
| Win | 27–7 | Houston Alexander | Decision (unanimous) | Bellator 99 | 13 September 2013 | 3 | 5:00 | Temecula, California, United States | |
| Loss | 26–7 | Ryan Bader | Submission (guillotine choke) | UFC on Fox: Johnson vs. Dodson | 26 January 2013 | 1 | 0:50 | Chicago, Illinois, United States | |
| Loss | 26–6 | Alexander Gustafsson | TKO (punches) | UFC 141 | 30 December 2011 | 1 | 2:13 | Las Vegas, Nevada, United States | |
| Win | 26–5 | Jason Brilz | KO (punches) | UFC 129 | 30 April 2011 | 1 | 0:20 | Toronto, Ontario, Canada | |
| Win | 25–5 | Alexandre Ferreira | TKO (punches and elbows) | UFC 122 | 13 November 2010 | 1 | 2:20 | Oberhausen, Germany | |
| Loss | 24–5 | Jon Jones | TKO (elbows) | UFC Live: Jones vs. Matyushenko | 1 August 2010 | 1 | 1:52 | San Diego, California, United States | |
| Win | 24–4 | Eliot Marshall | Decision (split) | UFC Live: Vera vs. Jones | 21 March 2010 | 3 | 5:00 | Broomfield, Colorado, United States | |
| Win | 23–4 | Igor Pokrajac | Decision (unanimous) | UFC 103 | 19 September 2009 | 3 | 5:00 | Dallas, Texas, United States | |
| Win | 22–4 | Jason Lambert | Decision (unanimous) | Call to Arms I | 16 May 2009 | 3 | 5:00 | Ontario, California, United States | |
| Loss | 21–4 | Antônio Rogério Nogueira | KO (knee) | Affliction: Day of Reckoning | 24 January 2009 | 2 | 4:26 | Anaheim, California, United States | |
| Win | 21–3 | Jamal Patterson | TKO (punches) | IFL: New Jersey | 4 April 2008 | 2 | 3:35 | East Rutherford, New Jersey, United States | Defended the IFL Light Heavyweight Championship. |
| Win | 20–3 | Alex Schoenauer | Decision (unanimous) | IFL: World Grand Prix Semifinals | 3 November 2007 | 3 | 4:00 | Hoffman Estates, Illinois, United States | Won the inaugural IFL Light Heavyweight Championship. |
| Win | 19–3 | Tim Boetsch | Decision (unanimous) | IFL: 2007 Semifinals | 2 August 2007 | 3 | 4:00 | East Rutherford, New Jersey, United States | |
| Win | 18–3 | Aaron Stark | TKO (punches) | IFL: Everett | 1 June 2007 | 1 | 2:49 | Everett, Washington, United States | |
| Win | 17–3 | Justin Levens | TKO (punches) | IFL: Los Angeles | 17 March 2007 | 1 | 3:53 | Los Angeles, California, United States | |
| Win | 16–3 | Dwayne Compton | Submission (armbar) | IFL: Houston | 2 February 2007 | 1 | 1:47 | Houston, Texas, United States | |
| Win | 15–3 | Anthony Ruiz | Submission (armbar) | Extreme Wars 3: Bay Area Brawl | 3 June 2006 | 1 | 2:03 | Oakland, California, United States | |
| Win | 14–3 | Carlos Barreto | TKO (knee injury) | Jungle Fight 4 | 21 May 2005 | 1 | 0:26 | Manaus, Brazil | |
| Loss | 13–3 | Andrei Arlovski | KO (punch) | UFC 44 | 26 September 2003 | 1 | 2:14 | Las Vegas, Nevada, United States | |
| Win | 13–2 | Pedro Rizzo | Decision (unanimous) | UFC 41 | 28 February 2003 | 3 | 5:00 | Las Vegas, Nevada, United States | |
| Win | 12–2 | Travis Wiuff | TKO (submission to punches) | UFC 40 | 22 November 2002 | 1 | 4:10 | Las Vegas, Nevada, United States | |
| Win | 11–2 | Antônio Rogério Nogueira | Decision (unanimous) | UFO: Legend | 8 August 2002 | 3 | 5:00 | Tokyo, Japan | |
| Loss | 10–2 | Tito Ortiz | Decision (unanimous) | UFC 33 | 28 September 2001 | 5 | 5:00 | Las Vegas, Nevada, United States | For the UFC Light Heavyweight Championship |
| Win | 10–1 | Yuki Kondo | Decision (unanimous) | UFC 32 | 29 June 2001 | 3 | 5:00 | East Rutherford, New Jersey, United States | Light Heavyweight debut. |
| Win | 9–1 | Tommy Sauer | TKO (cut) | WEF: New Blood Conflict | 26 August 2000 | 2 | 2:17 | Evansville, Indiana, United States | |
| Win | 8–1 | John Marsh | Decision (unanimous) | IFC: Warriors Challenge 6 | 25 March 2000 | 3 | 5:00 | Friant, California, United States | |
| Loss | 7–1 | Vernon White | Decision (split) | IFC: Montreal Cage Combat | 9 October 1999 | 1 | 25:00 | Montreal, Quebec, Canada | |
| Win | 7–0 | Travis Fulton | Submission (neck crank) | IFC: Fighters Revenge | 2 April 1999 | 1 | 15:33 | Montreal, Quebec, Canada | |
| Win | 6–0 | Kenji Kawaguchi | KO (punches) | Vale Tudo Japan 1998 | 25 October 1998 | 1 | 3:10 | Urayasu, Chiba Japan | |
| Win | 5–0 | Joe Pardo | Decision | Rumble in Reno | 4 September 1998 | 3 | 5:00 | Reno, Nevada, United States | |
| Win | 4–0 | Anthony Macias | TKO (doctor stoppage) | IFC 7: Cage Combat | 30 May 1998 | 1 | 0:16 | Montreal, Quebec, Canada | |
| Win | 3–0 | Anthony Macias | TKO (submission to punches) | IFC 5: Battle in the Bayou | 5 September 1997 | 1 | 2:59 | Baton Rouge, Louisiana, United States | IFC 5 Tournament Final; won the IFC 5 Heavyweight Tournament. |
| Win | 2–0 | Robert Lalonde | TKO (submission to punches) | IFC 5: Battle in the Bayou | 5 September 1997 | 1 | 2:27 | Baton Rouge, Louisiana, United States | IFC 5 Tournament Semifinal. |
| Win | 1–0 | Vernon White | Submission (neck crank) | IFC 5: Battle in the Bayou | 5 September 1997 | 1 | 5:44 | Baton Rouge, Louisiana, United States | IFC 5 Tournament First Round. |

== See also ==
- List of current UFC fighters
- List of male mixed martial artists

== Notes ==
| New championship | 1st IFL Light Heavyweight Champion; 3 November 2007 – 31 July 2008 | Succeeded by IFL ceased operations |
