= Carlos Newton =

Canadian mixed martial artist

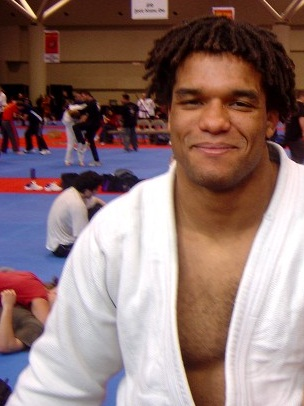
- Born: August 17, 1976 (age 50); The Valley, Anguilla
- Other names: The Ronin
- Nationality: Canadian
- Height: 5 ft 9 in (175 cm)
- Weight: 174 lb (79 kg; 12.4 st)
- Division: Welterweight; Middleweight; Light Heavyweight
- Style: Brazilian Jiu-Jitsu, Wrestling, Boxing, Taekwondo, Judo, Karate, Juko Ryu Jiu-Jitsu, Krav Maga, Kali, Aikido
- Fighting out of: Newmarket, Ontario, Canada
- Team: Newton MMA, Warrior MMA
- Rank: 3rd Dan Black Belt in Brazilian Jiu-Jitsu; Black Belt in Juko Ryu Jiu-Jitsu
- Years active: 1996–2010

Mixed martial arts record
- Total: 30
- Wins: 16
- By knockout: 2
- By submission: 10
- By decision: 4
- Losses: 14
- By knockout: 3
- By submission: 4
- By decision: 7

Other information
- Website: http://www.newtonmma.com
- Mixed martial arts record from Sherdog

Carlos Newton (born August 17, 1976) is an Anguillia-born Canadian retired mixed martial artist (MMA). He is a former UFC Welterweight Champion (the youngest champion of the division in UFC) and Pride FC Japan MMA Legend. Known as "The Ronin", he competed worldwide in MMA organizations including UFC, Pride FC, IFL, K-1, Shooto and W-1. He is a 3rd Degree Brazilian Jiu-Jitsu Black Belt alongside his coach Terry Riggs under Renzo Gracie, at Warrior MMA in Newmarket, Ontario. Newton is known as a "Submission Master" and has dubbed his personal fighting style — an amalgam of Brazilian Jiu-Jitsu, Judo, Wrestling, Karate, Krav Maga, and Boxing — as "Dragon Ball Jiu-Jitsu" in tribute to Dragon Ball, a Japanese manga and anime franchise. Newton is one of only a few MMA athletes to compete in the UFC and Pride FC at the same time. On May 4, 2001, Newton became the first Canadian UFC Champion when he defeated Pat Miletich at UFC 31.

== Early life ==
Carlos Newton was born in Anguilla and moved to Canada at the age of 8. He attended Westview Centennial Secondary School in the early 90s in the Jane and Finch area of Toronto, Ontario. Newton competed in numerous Jiu-Jitsu and BJJ competitions in Canada and across the world, starting under the legendary Tom Sharkey. Notably, the prestigious Abu Dhabi Combat Club in Abu Dhabi, United Arab Emirates, against Rodrigo Gracie of the legendary Gracie family. Newton started his Jiu-Jitsu competing career out of the Samurai Club in Toronto. Shortly after, in 1996, Terry Riggs founded Warrior Mixed Martial Arts in Newmarket, Ontario, which was Canada's first official MMA Academy; Newton followed his long-time training partner and made it his home. Out of Warrior MMA, Newton's career flourished under the coaching of Terry Riggs and Everton McEwan. Newton, a Toronto York University student, did his study on geriatric medicine, having done research at Baycrest Hospital, one of the world leaders in geriatric care.

== Mixed martial arts career ==
=== Early career ===
Newton's professional mixed martial arts career began at age of 19 in 1996. His first professional fight took place in April 1996 at the Kahnawake reservation near Montreal, where he faced Jean Rivière, who was at least 75 lbs heavier. After dominating much of the fight, it ended with a submission loss due to sheer exhaustion for Newton, however, the spectacle of the brave smaller fighter launched his career. Newton competed in the world's top mixed martial arts organizations such as Shooto, K-1 and Pride Fighting Championships in Japan, UFC in America and W-1 in Canada.

=== Pride FC and Shooto Japan ===
Newton started his Japan fight career with a win over Erik Paulson to become the Vale Tudo Japan World Champion. After a few dominating fights in the Shooto organization, he then moved on to PRIDE FC, considered to be the top MMA show in the world along with the UFC. In June 1998, Newton lost a technical bout in Pride Fighting Championships against Kazushi Sakuraba. The Sakuraba vs. Newton fight is remembered today as a classic and one of the best MMA fights ever for submission grappling fans. This legendary fight propelled both fighters to MMA superstardom. Newton went on in the PRIDE Japan to rack up wins over Daijiro Matsui, Naoki Sano, Johil de Oliveira, all on his way to a spectacular armbar victory over "Pelé" José Landi-Jons at Pride 19 in February 2002. After this win Pride President Naoto Morishita declared, "Newton is considered the unofficial PRIDE middle weight Champion". In October 2003, Newton gained a split-decision victory over Renzo Gracie at Pride Bushido 1.

=== Ultimate Fighting Championships ===
Newton's fourth and fifth fights marked his UFC debut at UFC 17, defeating Bob Gilstrap and losing a controversial decision to Dan Henderson on the same night for the middle weight tournament title. Newton's greatest professional accomplishment in his career was capturing the UFC Welterweight Championship from Pat Miletich in May 2001 at UFC 31. The reign was short-lived however, as Newton lost his first title defense in November of that same year at UFC 34 against accomplished wrestler Matt Hughes. Newton had a triangle choke locked in on Hughes, but Hughes picked up Newton, walked him to the corner, and attempted to slam him. Newton placed his arm over the side of the cage to prevent the slam, causing John McCarthy to warn him, before Hughes seemed to lose consciousness and fall to the mat while still holding Newton, causing Newton to hit his head and also lose consciousness. With Hughes slow to get up and Newton out cold on the mat, McCarthy would award the victory to Hughes via KO. The ending of the fight proved to be controversial, as many believed that Hughes was unconscious before Newton, who should have been awarded the victory as a result.

=== K-1 HEROs ===
Newton was set for a comeback fight at K-1's HEROs MMA promotion against Melvin Manhoef at the Ariake Coliseum on August 5, but had to pull out of the fight at the last minute due to a torn ligament in his knee. He made a second attempt at a comeback in K-1 HEROs, this time facing Tokimitsu Ishizawa. Newton made short work of the Japanese fighter, needing only four punches to score the TKO victory in just 22 seconds. He then faced Shungo Oyama at Hero's Korea 2007 where he lost by submission due to punches.

=== International Fight League ===
Newton and Riggs were the coaches of the Toronto Dragons in the IFL in the 2005 and 2006 seasons. Based out of Warrior MMA in Newmarket, the Dragons were made up of international notable fighters such as Claude Patrick, Wagnney Fabiano, Brent Beauparlant, Rafael Cavalcante, Leo Santos and Dennis Hallman. The Dragons made the playoffs in the 2006 season and went on as far as the semifinals round. Wagnney Fabiano from the team qualified and won the IFL Lightweight Championship. Newton fought in a superfight that year and lost to Renzo Gracie by way of an extremely controversial split decision at the IFL Championship Final. Gracie himself questioned the call after the fight.

=== W-1 ===
Carlos, motivated by a chance to compete in Canada, made a return to MMA again in 2009 at Warrior-1: Inception. He scored a first round victory by way of KO against Nabil Khatib, this was Carlos's first fight on Canadian soil in 13 years. He again returned to action on October 10, 2009, against former UFC veteran "Mr. International" Shonie Carter at Warrior-1: High Voltage. The bout was to be for the Warrior-1 Welterweight Championship, but because Newton did not make weight, it was a non-title bout. Newton beat Carter by unanimous decision after three rounds.

In 2009, after his win over Shonie Carter, he stated in an interview to Sherdog that he was anticipating his return to fighting abroad, with particular interest in Japan. However, after one more fight in Australia, Newton decided, that after a successful fight career that spanned 14 years, it was finally time to take a break and focus on coaching.

Following his retirement, Newton had coached at his home gym, Warrior Mixed Martial Arts, in Newmarket, Ontario, until he eventually opened and began coaching at his own gym, Newton Mixed Martial Arts, in Pickering, Ontario.

== Accomplishments ==
- Jiu-Jitsu
  - Canadian Jiu-Jitsu Champion (5 times) (including Open Weight Champion)
- Pankration
  - Canadian Pankration Champion (2 times)
- Ultimate Fighting Championship
  - UFC Welterweight Championship (One time)
    - First Canadian champion in UFC history
  - UFC 17 Middleweight Tournament Runner Up
  - UFC Encyclopedia Awards
    - Fight of the Night (One time) vs. Dan Henderson
    - Submission of the Night (Three times) vs. Bob Gilstrap, Pat Miletich and Pete Spratt

== Mixed martial arts record ==
Professional record breakdown
| 30 matches | 16 wins | 14 losses |
| By knockout | 2 | 3 |
| By submission | 10 | 4 |
| By decision | 4 | 7 |

| Res. | Record | Opponent | Method | Event | Date | Round | Time | Location | Notes |
|---|---|---|---|---|---|---|---|---|---|
| Loss | 16–14 | Brian Ebersole | Decision (unanimous) | Impact FC 1 | July 10, 2010 | 3 | 5:00 | Brisbane, Australia | |
| Win | 16–13 | Shonie Carter | Decision (unanimous) | Warrior-1: High Voltage | October 10, 2009 | 3 | 5:00 | Gatineau, Quebec, Canada | Originally for W-1 Welterweight title; Newton failed to make weight and the match was ruled as a non-title bout. |
| Win | 15–13 | Nabil Khatib | KO (punches) | Warrior-1: Inception | March 28, 2009 | 1 | 3:12 | Gatineau, Quebec, Canada | |
| Loss | 14–13 | Shungo Oyama | Submission (punches) | Hero's 2007 in Korea | October 27, 2007 | 3 | 2:42 | Seoul, South Korea | |
| Loss | 14–12 | Matt Lindland | Submission (guillotine choke) | IFL – Houston | February 2, 2007 | 2 | 1:43 | Houston, Texas, United States | |
| Loss | 14–11 | Renzo Gracie | Decision (split) | IFL Championship Final | December 29, 2006 | 3 | 4:00 | Uncasville, Connecticut, United States | |
| Win | 14–10 | Tokimitsu Ishizawa | TKO (punches) | Hero's 7 | October 9, 2006 | 1 | 0:22 | Yokohama, Japan | |
| Loss | 13–10 | Ryo Chonan | Decision (unanimous) | Pride Bushido 5 | October 14, 2004 | 2 | 5:00 | Osaka, Japan | |
| Loss | 13–9 | Daiju Takase | Decision (split) | Pride Bushido 3 | May 23, 2004 | 2 | 5:00 | Yokohama, Japan | |
| Loss | 13–8 | Renato Verissimo | Decision (unanimous) | UFC 46 | January 31, 2004 | 3 | 5:00 | Las Vegas, Nevada, United States | |
| Win | 13–7 | Renzo Gracie | Decision (split) | Pride Bushido 1 | October 5, 2003 | 2 | 5:00 | Saitama, Japan | |
| Loss | 12–7 | Anderson Silva | KO (flying knee and punches) | Pride 25 | March 16, 2003 | 1 | 6:27 | Yokohama, Japan | |
| Win | 12–6 | Pete Spratt | Submission (kimura) | UFC 40 | November 22, 2002 | 1 | 1:45 | Las Vegas, Nevada, United States | |
| Loss | 11–6 | Matt Hughes | TKO (punches) | UFC 38 | July 13, 2002 | 4 | 3:35 | London, England | For the UFC Welterweight Championship. |
| Win | 11–5 | Jose Landi-Jons | Submission (armbar) | Pride 19 | February 24, 2002 | 1 | 7:16 | Saitama, Japan | |
| Loss | 10–5 | Matt Hughes | KO (slam) | UFC 34 | November 2, 2001 | 2 | 1:27 | Las Vegas, Nevada, United States | Lost the UFC Welterweight Championship. |
| Win | 10–4 | Pat Miletich | Submission (bulldog choke) | UFC 31 | May 4, 2001 | 3 | 2:50 | Atlantic City, New Jersey, United States | Won the UFC Welterweight Championship. |
| Loss | 9–4 | Dave Menne | Decision (unanimous) | Shidokan Jitsu – Warriors War 1 | February 8, 2001 | 1 | 10:00 | Kuwait | Middleweight bout |
| Win | 9–3 | Johil de Oliveira | Decision (unanimous) | Pride 12 - Cold Fury | December 9, 2000 | 2 | 10:00 | Saitama, Japan | |
| Win | 8–3 | Yuhi Sano | Submission (armbar) | Pride 9 | June 4, 2000 | 1 | 0:40 | Nagoya, Japan | |
| Win | 7–3 | Karl Schmidt | Submission (armbar) | WEF 9 – World Class | May 13, 2000 | 1 | 1:12 | Evansville, Indiana, United States | |
| Win | 6–3 | Daijiro Matsui | Decision (unanimous) | Pride 6 | July 4, 1999 | 3 | 5:00 | Yokohama, Japan | |
| Win | 5–3 | Kenji Kawaguchi | Submission (armbar) | Shooto - 10th Anniversary Event | May 29, 1999 | 1 | 5:00 | Yokohama, Japan | |
| Loss | 4–3 | Kazushi Sakuraba | Submission (kneebar) | Pride 3 | June 24, 1998 | 2 | 5:19 | Tokyo, Japan | |
| Loss | 4–2 | Dan Henderson | Decision (split) | UFC 17 | May 15, 1998 | 1 | 15:00 | Mobile, Alabama, US | UFC 17 Middleweight Tournament Final. |
| Win | 4–1 | Bob Gilstrap | Submission (triangle choke) | UFC 17 | May 15, 1998 | 1 | 0:52 | Mobile, Alabama, US | UFC 17 Middleweight Tournament Semifinal. |
| Win | 3–1 | Kazuhiro Kusayanagi | Submission (armbar) | Shooto - Las Grandes Viajes 2 | March 1, 1998 | 1 | 2:17 | Tokyo, Japan | |
| Win | 2–1 | Haim Gozali | Submission (armbar) | Israel Fighting Championship - Israel vs. Canada | January 1, 1998 | 1 | N/A | Israel | |
| Win | 1–1 | Erik Paulson | Submission (armbar) | Vale Tudo Japan 1997 | November 29, 1997 | 1 | 0:41 | Tokyo, Japan | |
| Loss | 0–1 | Jean Rivière | Submission (exhaustion) | Extreme Fighting 2 | April 26, 1996 | 1 | 7:22 | Montreal, Quebec, Canada | |

| Preceded by Pat Miletich | 2nd UFC Welterweight Champion; May 4, 2001 – November 2, 2001 | Succeeded by Matt Hughes |
