= Homer Moore =

American mixed martial arts fighter

- Born: Homer Moore; November 12, 1971 (age 54); Maryvale, Arizona, United States
- Other names: The Rock, Simpson
- Height: 5 ft 10 in (1.78 m)
- Weight: 202 lb (92 kg; 14.4 st)
- Division: Heavyweight; Light Heavyweight
- Fighting out of: Scottsdale, Arizona, United States
- Years active: 1999-2007; 2013

Mixed martial arts record
- Total: 37
- Wins: 26
- By knockout: 8
- By submission: 4
- By decision: 14
- Losses: 9
- By knockout: 5
- By submission: 1
- By decision: 3
- Draws: 2

Other information
- Mixed martial arts record from Sherdog

Homer Moore (born November 12, 1971) is an American retired former professional mixed martial artist who competed as a Light Heavyweight for the UFC, WEC, and Chicago Red Bears of the IFL.

== Background ==
Moore won the 1992 National Junior College Athletic Association NJCAA Collegiate Championship effortlessly. His background wrestling at Phoenix College gave him rise above his competition. Moore's Champion Stat is now part of the National Wrestling Hall of Fame and Museum in Stillwater, Oklahoma. Having a record of this magnitude clones other major sports at their pinnacle.

In 2014 Homer Moore was arrested for the 1999 murder of a man in a drug deal robbery gone wrong. Lt. Michael Pooley, a Tempe police spokesman, said in a news conference that "Moore liked to talk" and would brag about murdering a man at bars and to random people, who told police what they'd heard.

== Mixed martial arts career ==
Moore reached nearly 100 fights in his MMA career. He was a resident athlete at the United States Olympic Training Center in the mid '90s. Subsequently, Homer pursued other fighting opportunities and engaged in the Mixed Martial Arts arena. During Moore's transition, he won 10 straight fights over a 3-year period.

Although injured during his training for the fight, Moore preceded with his first professional fight in the UFC against UFC Middleweight Champion Evan Tanner in UFC 34 - High Voltage. This resulted in a defeat by submission armbar. During Moore's debut fight in the IFL, out of Chicago, Illinois, he fought against jiu-jitsu expert Allan Goes.

=== Ultimate XARM World Heavyweight Championship ===
In January 2009, Moore was the first ever to be titled the Ultimate World Heavyweight Champion of Art Davie XARM. The competitors who participated in this tournament came from a variety of fighting backgrounds that included arm wrestling, football, kickboxing, mixed-martial arts and weightlifting. The winner's objective of this sport was to pin his opponent's arm, knock him out or make him submit.

Moore was also recognized as the "Best Fighter" under XARM's "Best of 2008 Awards".

== Mixed martial arts record ==
Professional record breakdown
37 matches	26 wins	9 losses
By knockout	5	3
By submission	7	3
By decision	14	3
Draws	2	
No contests	0	

Res.	Record	Opponent	Method	Event	Date	Round	Time	Location	Notes
Win	26–9–2	Vincent Lawler	KO (punch)	APC 11: All Powers Combat 11	March 16, 2013	2	2:18	Payson, Arizona, United States	
Loss	25–9–2	Fabiano Capoani	TKO (knee injury)	MMAC: The Revolution	May 12, 2007	1	3:59	Washington D.C., United States	
Loss	25–8–2	Allan Goes	TKO (punches)	IFL: Moline	April 7, 2007	2	2:56	Moline, Illinois, United States	
Loss	25–7–2	Matt Lucas	TKO	RITC 89: Triple Main Event 89	December 2, 2006	3	1:26	Maricopa, Arizona, United States	
Loss	25–6–2	Chad Griggs	TKO (strikes)	RITC 81: Rage in the Cage 81	April 29, 2006	3	0:30	Arizona, United States	
Win	25–5–2	Marc Zee	Decision (unanimous)	RITC 68: Hello Glendale 68	April 23, 2005	3	3:00	Glendale, Arizona, United States	
Loss	24–5–2	Terry Martin	TKO (submission to punches)	WEC 14	March 17, 2005	2	3:14	Lemoore, California, United States	Light Heavyweight bout; for the vacant WEC Light Heavyweight Championship.
Win	24–4–2	Shane Johnson	KO	RITC 64: Heart & Soul 64	August 7, 2004	2	2:17	Phoenix, Arizona, United States	
Win	23–4–2	Tim McMullen	KO (punches)	RITC 63: It's Time 63	June 12, 2004	1	2:01	Phoenix, Arizona, United States	
Win	22–4–2	Andy Montana	Decision (unanimous)	RITC 61: Relentless 61	April 30, 2004	3	3:00	Phoenix, Arizona, United States	
Win	21–4–2	Vince Lucero	Decision (unanimous)	RITC 58: Homer vs. Vince 58	January 29, 2004	3	3:00	Tempe, Arizona, United States	
Loss	20–4–2	Chael Sonnen	Decision (unanimous)	ROTR 4.5: Proving Grounds	December 27, 2003	2	5:00	Hilo, Hawaii, United States	
Win	20–3–2	Thomas Gil	Submission (keylock)	RITC 55: Super Heavyweight Showdown 55	November 15, 2003	3	2:51	Casa Grande, Arizona, United States	
Draw	19–3–2	Dan Severn	Draw	RITC 54: The Beast vs The Rock 54	October 25, 2003	3	3:00	Phoenix, Arizona, United States	
Win	19–3–1	Chris Peak	Decision (unanimous)	RITC 53: The Beat Goes On 53	September 13, 2003	3	3:00	Phoenix, Arizona, United States	
Win	18–3–1	Wojtek Kaszowski	Decision (unanimous)	RITC 51: Invasion From the North 51	August 2, 2003	3	3:00	Phoenix, Arizona, United States	
Loss	17–3–1	Jeremy Horn	Decision (unanimous)	ICC 2: Rebellion	April 18, 2003	3	5:00	Minneapolis, Minnesota, United States	
Loss	17–2–1	Edwin Dewees	Decision (majority)	RITC 45: Finally 45	March 1, 2003	3	3:00	Phoenix, Arizona, United States	
Win	17–1–1	Edwin Aguilar	TKO (submission to punches)	CLM 3: Combate Libre Mexico	September 20, 2002	2	N/A	Mexico	
Win	16–1–1	Rich Guerin	KO	CLM 3: Combate Libre Mexico	September 20, 2002	2	N/A	Mexico	
Win	15–1–1	Sam Adkins	Decision	CLM 3: Combate Libre Mexico	September 20, 2002	4	5:00	Mexico	
Win	14–1–1	Cory Timmerman	Decision	RITC 37: When Countries Collide 37	July 27, 2002	3	3:00	Phoenix, Arizona, United States	
Win	13–1–1	Vince Lucero	TKO (submission to punches)	RITC 35: This Time It's Personal 35	May 3, 2002	3	1:09	Phoenix, Arizona, United States	
Win	12–1–1	Joe Riggs	Decision (unanimous)	RITC 34: Rage in the Cage 34	March 15, 2002	3	3:00	Phoenix, Arizona, United States	Return to Heavyweight.
Draw	11–1–1	Jim Theobald	Decision	UA 1: The Genesis	January 27, 2002	3	5:00	Hammond, Indiana, United States	
Loss	11–1	Evan Tanner	Submission (armbar)	UFC 34	November 2, 2001	2	0:55	Las Vegas, Nevada, United States	Light Heavyweight debut.
Win	11–0	Kauai Kupihea	Decision	RITC 26: Rage in the Cage 26	March 24, 2001	3	3:00	Phoenix, Arizona, United States	
Win	10–0	Kevin Christopher	Submission (armbar)	RITC 24: Rage in the Cage 24	January 27, 2001	1	1:14	Phoenix, Arizona, United States	
Win	9–0	Allan Sullivan	Decision (unanimous)	CF: Cajan Fights	December 2, 2000	3	5:00	United States	
Win	8–0	Shane Johnson	TKO	RITC 22: Rage in the Cage 22	November 8, 2000	3	1:51	Phoenix, Arizona, United States	
Win	7–0	Kauai Kupihea	Decision (unanimous)	RITC 21 - Rage in the Cage 21	October 4, 2000	3	3:00	Phoenix, Arizona, United States	
Win	6–0	Zack Blackwood	Submission (armbar)	RITC 20 - Rage in the Cage 20	August 30, 2000	1	0:30	Phoenix, Arizona, United States	
Win	5–0	Drew Mora	Decision (unanimous)	RITC 19: Rage in the Cage 19	July 26, 2000	3	3:00	Phoenix, Arizona, United States	
Win	4–0	David Harris	Decision (3-1)	RITC 10: Rage in the Cage 10	January 28, 2000	3	3:00	Phoenix, Arizona, United States	
Win	3–0	Jesus Valdez	Submission (choke)	RITC 8: Rage in the Cage 8	November 10, 1999	1	2:37	Phoenix, Arizona, United States	
Win	2–0	Ron Rumpf	TKO (submission to punches)	RITC 5: Rage in the Cage 5	May 26, 1999	1	1:31	Phoenix, Arizona, United States	
Win	1–0	Jason Middaugh	Decision (unanimous)	RITC 4: Rage in the Cage 4	April 7, 1999	3	3:00	Phoenix, Arizona, United States	
