= National Register of Historic Places listings in Logan County, Illinois =

Location of Logan County in Illinois

This is a list of the National Register of Historic Places listings in Logan County, Illinois.

This is intended to be a complete list of the properties and districts on the National Register of Historic Places in Logan County, Illinois, United States. Latitude and longitude coordinates are provided for many National Register properties and districts; these locations may be seen together in a map.

There are 12 properties and districts listed on the National Register in the county.

This National Park Service list is complete through NPS recent listings posted December 12, 2025.

== Current listings ==
	Name on the Register	Image	Date listed	Location	City or town	Description
1	Allen Chapel African Methodist Episcopal Church	Allen Chapel African Methodist Episcopal Church	May 12, 2004 (#04000422)	902 Broadway; 40°08′41″N 89°21′33″W	Lincoln	
2	Atlanta Public Library	Atlanta Public Library	December 11, 1979 (#79000852)	Race and Arch Sts. 40°15′37″N 89°13′57″W	Atlanta	
3	Robert Buckles Barn	Robert Buckles Barn	February 10, 1983 (#83000326)	Southeast of Mount Pulaski; 39°59′08″N 89°16′25″W	Mount Pulaski	
4	Downey Building	Downey Building	February 25, 2004 (#04000069)	110-112 SW. Arch St. 40°15′38″N 89°13′53″W	Atlanta	
5	Stephan A. Foley House	Stephan A. Foley House	May 3, 1984 (#84001141)	427 Tremont St. 40°09′08″N 89°21′54″W	Lincoln	
6	J.H. Hawes Elevator	J.H. Hawes Elevator	May 17, 1991 (#91000571)	2nd St. 40°15′39″N 89°14′02″W	Atlanta	
7	Hoblit House	Hoblit House	May 22, 2007 (#07000454)	505 N. College Ave. 40°09′15″N 89°21′53″W	Lincoln	
8	Lincoln Courthouse Square Historic District	Lincoln Courthouse Square Historic District	December 24, 1985 (#85003166)	Roughly bounded by Sangamon, Pekin, Chicago, Delaware, Broadway, and Pulaski Sts. 40°08′46″N 89°21′45″W	Lincoln	
9	Lincoln Public Library	Lincoln Public Library	September 12, 1980 (#80001384)	725 Pekin St. 40°08′49″N 89°21′40″W	Lincoln	
10	Theodore H. O. Mattfeldt House	Theodore H. O. Mattfeldt House	August 1, 1996 (#96000853)	202 S. Marion St. 40°00′30″N 89°17′12″W	Mount Pulaski	
11	Mount Pulaski Courthouse	Mount Pulaski Courthouse	August 3, 1978 (#78001164)	Public Sq. 40°00′33″N 89°17′04″W	Mount Pulaski	
12	University Hall	University Hall	April 24, 1973 (#73000711)	300 Keokuk St. 40°09′24″N 89°21′42″W	Lincoln	

== See also ==
- List of National Historic Landmarks in Illinois
- National Register of Historic Places listings in Illinois
