= 2002 in UFC =

Mixed martial arts events

Information
- First date: January 11, 2002
- Last date: November 22, 2002

Events
- Total events: 7
- UFC: 7

Fights
- Total fights: 52
- Title fights: 9

Chronology
2001 in UFC	2002 in UFC	2003 in UFC

The year 2002 was the 10th year in the history of the Ultimate Fighting Championship (UFC), a mixed martial arts promotion based in the United States. In 2002 the UFC held 7 events beginning with, UFC 35: Throwdown.

== Title fights ==
Title fights in 2002
Weight class				Method	Round	Time	Event	Notes
Middleweight	Murilo Bustamante	def.	Dave Menne (c)	TKO (punches)	2	0:44	UFC 35	(Note: For the UFC Middleweight Championship.)
Lightweight	Jens Pulver (c)	def.	B.J. Penn	Decision (majority)	5	5:00	UFC 35	(Note: For the UFC Lightweight Championship.)
Welterweight	Matt Hughes (c)	def.	Hayato Sakurai	TKO (punches)	4	3:01	UFC 36	(Note: For the UFC Welterweight Championship.)
Heavyweight	Josh Barnett	def.	Randy Couture (c)	TKO (punches)	2	4:35	UFC 36	(Note: For the UFC Heavyweight Championship. Afterwards Barnett would be stripped of the title when he tested positive for steroids during a mandatory post-fight drug test.)
Middleweight	Murilo Bustamante (c)	def.	Matt Lindland	Submission (guillotine choke)	3	1:33	UFC 37	(Note: For the UFC Middleweight Championship. Bustamante had Lindland hooked cleanly in an armbar early in the fight, then released it after what seemed to be a tap, followed by a shout to stop the action by John McCarthy. Lindland claimed it wasn't a tap, which controversially led McCarthy to restart the fight. This has led to the contest being known as the infamous "double tap" fight. Bustamante was stripped of the title in October 2002 after signing with PRIDE, thereby vacating the UFC Middleweight Championship belt.)
Welterweight	Matt Hughes (c)	def.	Carlos Newton	TKO (punches)	4	3:27	UFC 38	(Note: For the UFC Welterweight Championship.)
Heavyweight	Ricco Rodriguez	def.	Randy Couture	TKO (submission to elbow)	5	3:04	UFC 39	(Note: For the vacant UFC Heavyweight Championship.)
Welterweight	Matt Hughes (c)	def.	Gil Castillo	TKO (doctor stoppage)	1	5:00	UFC 40	(Note: For the UFC Welterweight Championship. Hughes wins via TKO (accidental headbutt) after round 1. Between rounds doctors ruled that the resulting cut was too severe to continue.)
Light Heavyweight	Tito Ortiz (c)	def.	Ken Shamrock	TKO (corner stoppage)	3	5:00	UFC 40	(Note: For the UFC Light Heavyweight Championship.)

== Debut UFC fighters ==
The following fighters fought their first UFC fight in 2002:

ISO	Fighter	Division
(United States)	Aaron Riley	Lightweight
(Russia)	Amar Suloev	Middleweight
(Russia)	Andrei Semenov	Middleweight
(United States)	Benji Radach	Middleweight
(Australia)	Chris Haseman	Light Heavyweight
(Japan)	Genki Sudo	Lightweight
(Japan)	Hayato Sakurai	Welterweight
(United States)	Ivan Salaverry	Middleweight

ISO	Fighter	Division
(England)	James Zikic	Light Heavyweight
(Brazil)	Joao Marcos Pierini	Welterweight
(United States)	Keith Rockel	Middleweight
(United States)	Kelly Dullanty	Lightweight
(England)	Leigh Remedios	Bantamweight
(England)	Mark Weir	Middleweight
(United States)	Nick Serra	Welterweight
(United States)	Paul Creighton	Lightweight

ISO	Fighter	Division
(United States)	Pete Spratt	Welterweight
(United States)	Robbie Lawler	Welterweight
(Brazil)	Rodrigo Ruas	Middleweight
(United States)	Tim Sylvia	Heavyweight
(United States)	Travis Wiuff	Heavyweight
(United States)	Wesley Correira	Heavyweight
(United States)	Zach Light	Lightweight

== Events list ==
#	Event	Date	Venue	Location	Attendance
045	UFC 40: Vendetta	Nov 22, 2002	MGM Grand Garden Arena	Las Vegas, Nevada, U.S.	13,770
044	UFC 39: The Warriors Return	Sep 27, 2002	Mohegan Sun Arena	Uncasville, Connecticut, U.S.	7,800
043	UFC 38: Brawl at the Hall	Jul 13, 2002	Royal Albert Hall	London, England, U.K.	5,000
042	UFC 37.5: As Real As It Gets	Jun 22, 2002	Bellagio	Las Vegas, Nevada, U.S.	3,700
041	UFC 37: High Impact	May 10, 2002	CenturyTel Center	Bossier City, Louisiana, U.S.	7,200
040	UFC 36: Worlds Collide	Mar 22, 2002	MGM Grand Garden Arena	Las Vegas, Nevada, U.S.	10,000
039	UFC 35: Throwdown	Jan 11, 2002	Mohegan Sun Arena	Uncasville, Connecticut, U.S.	9,600

== See also ==
- UFC
- List of UFC champions
- List of UFC events
