= Mixed martial arts in the United Kingdom =

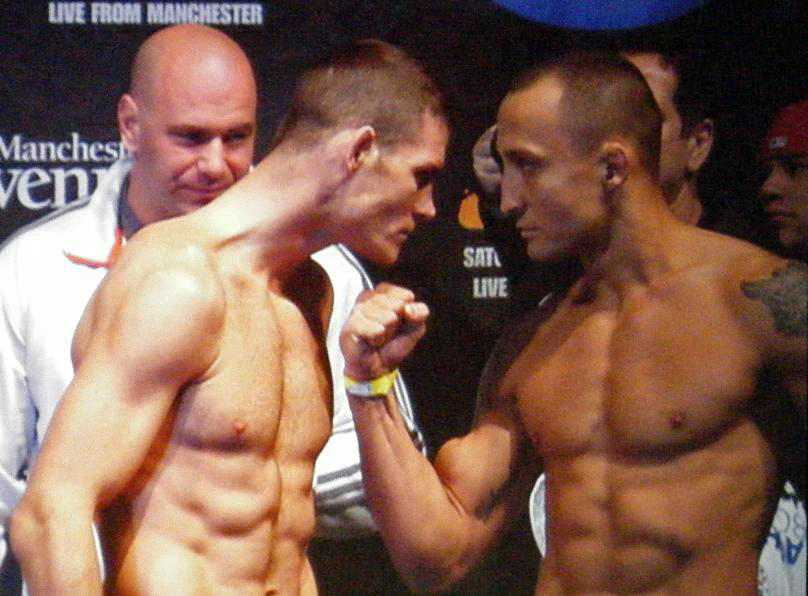
- Michael Bisping (left) and Denis Kang at the weigh-ins for UFC 105 (Manchester)
- Country: United Kingdom
- Governing body: English Mixed Martial Arts Association
- National team: United Kingdom

Mixed Martial Arts in the United Kingdom is one of the fastest growing sports thanks to the promotion of the UFC.

== History ==
UFC 38 was one the earliest entries of MMA in the United Kingdom on July 13, 2002, at Royal Albert Hall. Regional and national events regularly take place with local and international promotions such as the Ultimate Fighting Championship.

Michael Bisping became the first UK UFC champion. In 2025 Tom Aspinall become the third UK UFC champion after Leon Edwards in 2022.

British people who won a World MMA title with major organisation, other than the UFC, include Liam McGeary, Brendan Loughnane, and most recently Dakota Ditcheva who in 2024 became Britain's first female World MMA Champion.

== Domestic Organizations ==
The major organizations for MMA are Cage Warriors, UCMMA and Full Contact Contender.

== Television ==
The UFC is broadcast on BT Sport. The PFL is broadcast on Channel 4 as of 2022. Bellator MMA is broadcast on Channel 5. ONE is broadcast on Sky Sports as of 2024.
