= UFC 35 =

UFC mixed martial arts event in 2002

UFC 35: Throwdown
- The poster for UFC 35: Throwdown
- Promotion: Ultimate Fighting Championship
- Date: January 11, 2002
- Venue: Mohegan Sun Arena
- City: Uncasville, Connecticut
- Attendance: 9,600
- Buyrate: 35,000

Event chronology
UFC 34: High Voltage	UFC 35: Throwdown	UFC 36: Worlds Collide

UFC 35: Throwdown was a mixed martial arts event held by the Ultimate Fighting Championship at the Mohegan Sun Arena in Uncasville, Connecticut, on January 11, 2002. The event was seen live on pay per view in the United States, and later released on home video.

== History ==
UFC 35 featured two title bouts, Jens Pulver faced B.J. Penn for the Lightweight Title and Murilo Bustamante faced Dave Menne for the Middleweight Title. This was the first UFC event to be headlined by a Lightweight bout.

According to a December 2008 Sherdog interview with Pat Miletich, the event was plagued by a flu-like illness that spread throughout the fighters, trainers, and production staff.

Despite a number of fighters suffering from such symptoms as diarrhea, dehydration, hallucinations, and vomiting, the event proceeded as planned. Most people attributed the illness to a hotel restaurant named "The Octagon". Kevin Randleman admitted to defecating inside his fight shorts during his bout with Renato "Babalu" Sobral. Dave Menne was drinking Pepto Bismol until his walk to the cage. Eugene Jackson also fought (and won) with a fever.

Shonie Carter was originally scheduled to face Gil Castillo at this event, but was pulled due to outside contractual obligations with another promotion. Chris Brennan stepped in as his replacement.

Shortly after this event, Jens Pulver would leave UFC due to a contract dispute.

== Results ==
Main Card
Weight class				Method	Round	Time	Notes
Lightweight	Jens Pulver (c)	def.	B.J. Penn	Decision (majority) (48–45, 47–47, 48–47)	5	5:00	(Note: For the UFC Lightweight Championship.)
Heavyweight	Ricco Rodriguez	def.	Jeff Monson	TKO (punches)	3	3:00
Middleweight	Murilo Bustamante	def.	Dave Menne (c)	TKO (punches)	2	0:44	(Note: For the UFC Middleweight Championship.)
Light Heavyweight	Chuck Liddell	def.	Amar Suloev	Decision (unanimous) (30–27, 30–27, 30–27)	3	5:00
Middleweight	Andrei Semenov	def.	Ricardo Almeida	TKO (punches)	2	2:01
Preliminary Card
Light Heavyweight	Kevin Randleman	def.	Renato Sobral	Decision (unanimous) (30–26, 30–26, 30–25)	3	5:00
Welterweight	Gil Castillo	def.	Chris Brennan	Decision (unanimous) (30–26, 30–27, 30–28)	3	5:00
Middleweight	Eugene Jackson	def.	Keith Rockel	Submission (guillotine choke)	2	3:46

== Encyclopedia awards ==
The following fighters were honored in the October 2011 book titled UFC Encyclopedia.

- Fight of the Night: Jens Pulver vs. B.J. Penn
- Knockout of the Night: Murilo Bustamante
- Submission of the Night: Eugene Jackson

== See also ==
- Ultimate Fighting Championship
- List of UFC champions
- List of UFC events
- 2002 in UFC
