= UFC 36 =

UFC mixed martial arts event in 2002

UFC 36: Worlds Collide
- The poster for UFC 36: Worlds Collide
- Promotion: Ultimate Fighting Championship
- Date: March 22, 2002
- Venue: MGM Grand Arena
- City: Las Vegas, Nevada
- Attendance: 10,000
- Total gate: $898,850
- Buyrate: 55,000

Event chronology
UFC 35: Throwdown	UFC 36: Worlds Collide	UFC 37: High Impact

UFC 36: Worlds Collide was a mixed martial arts event held by the Ultimate Fighting Championship at the MGM Grand Arena in Las Vegas, Nevada on March 22, 2002. The event was seen live on pay per view in the United States, and later released on home video.

== History ==
The card was headlined by two title bouts, a Heavyweight Championship bout between Randy Couture and Josh Barnett and a Welterweight title bout between Matt Hughes and Hayato Sakurai. UFC 36 marked the last UFC appearance of former 170 lb Champion Pat Miletich, and the last appearance of Pete Williams. Miletich decided to concentrate on training his fighters, including Matt Hughes who was now the UFC champion in Pat's preferred weight class.

Hughes was originally supposed to fight then-current Shooto welterweight champion, and future UFC Middleweight Champion Anderson Silva. However, Silva had signed a contract with PRIDE Fighting Championships.

Barnett defeated Couture via TKO (strikes) at 4:32 of the second round to become the new UFC Heavyweight Champion. Afterwards, Barnett was stripped of the title when he tested positive for steroids during a mandatory post-fight drug test.

Nine past or future UFC champions competed on this card (including at least one in each bout), more than any other event in UFC history.

== Results ==
Main Card
Weight class				Method	Round	Time	Notes
Heavyweight	Josh Barnett	def.	Randy Couture (c)	TKO (punches)	2	4:35	(Note: For the UFC Heavyweight Championship. Afterwards Barnett would be stripped of the title when he tested positive for steroids during a mandatory post-fight drug test.)
Heavyweight	Pedro Rizzo	def.	Andrei Arlovski	KO (punches)	3	1:45
Welterweight	Matt Hughes (c)	def.	Hayato Sakurai	TKO (punches)	4	3:01	(Note: For the UFC Welterweight Championship.)
Middleweight	Matt Lindland	def.	Pat Miletich	TKO (punches)	1	3:09
Light Heavyweight	Evan Tanner	def.	Elvis Sinosic	TKO (cut)	1	2:06
Heavyweight	Frank Mir	def.	Pete Williams	Submission (inside shoulder lock)	1	0:46
Lightweight	Matt Serra	def.	Kelly Dullanty	Submission (triangle choke)	1	2:58
Welterweight	Sean Sherk	def.	Jutaro Nakao	Decision (unanimous) (30–27, 30–27, 30–27)	3	5:00

== Encyclopedia awards ==
The following fighters were honored in the October 2011 book titled UFC Encyclopedia.

- Fight of the Night: Josh Barnett vs. Randy Couture
- Knockout of the Night: Pedro Rizzo
- Submission of the Night: Frank Mir

== See also ==
- Ultimate Fighting Championship
- List of UFC champions
- List of UFC events
- 2002 in UFC
