= UFC 40 =

UFC mixed martial arts event in 2002

UFC 40: Vendetta
- The poster for UFC 40: Vendetta
- Promotion: Ultimate Fighting Championship
- Date: November 22, 2002
- Venue: MGM Grand Garden Arena
- City: Paradise, Nevada
- Attendance: 13,265
- Total gate: $1,540,000
- Buyrate: 100,000

Event chronology
UFC 39: The Warriors Return	UFC 40: Vendetta	UFC 41: Onslaught

UFC 40: Vendetta was a mixed martial arts event held by the Ultimate Fighting Championship on November 22, 2002, at the MGM Grand Garden Arena on the Las Vegas Strip in Paradise, Nevada. The event was broadcast live on pay per view in the United States, and later released on DVD.

== History ==
UFC 40 contained one of the biggest, most important and most anticipated fights in UFC history, a UFC Light Heavyweight Championship fight between rivals Tito Ortiz and Ken Shamrock. Shamrock, a popular legendary fighter and former champion from the UFC's early years, was returning to the UFC for the first time since 1996. The fight was coined "the biggest fight in UFC history" by the UFC during the event.

UFC 40 also contained a Welterweight Title Bout between Matt Hughes and Gil Castillo. Tank Abbott provided an interview in the octagon after UFC President Dana White had announced Abbott would return to the octagon on a 3–fight deal.

Bruce Buffer has said many times that the fight between Ken Shamrock and Tito Ortiz was one of the greatest fights he has ever seen, and that the energy from the 13,700 fans that night was one of the greatest feelings he has ever experienced.

UFC 40 was also the first live UFC Pay Per View event to be aired on Australian cable television. Jeff Osborne continued as the behind-the-scenes interviewer for UFC 40.

UFC 40 continued to allow the fighters to enter the octagon with their own music playing.

== Significance ==
UFC 40 was a pivotal event for Zuffa. The anticipation for Ken Shamrock vs. Tito Ortiz resulted in a buyrate that was roughly double the buyrates of the previous Zuffa UFC shows. After initially losing a lot of money, UFC 40 showed Zuffa that it was possible to make money with the UFC. This was important for the sport of mixed martial arts because had UFC 40 been a failure, the possibility existed that Zuffa would have eventually sold the UFC and cut their losses; Zuffa was largely responsible for bringing mixed martial arts to the North American mainstream audience in the coming years, and without them, there was a good possibility the sport of mixed martial arts would have remained underground outside Japan. UFC 40 was a near sellout of 13,022 at the MGM Grand Garden Arena for a gate of $1,540,000, a UFC record at that point.

UFC 40 also gained mainstream exposure for mixed martial arts. Ken Shamrock and Tito Ortiz both appeared on The Best Damn Sports Show Period and engaged in trash talk on live television. Shamrock and Ortiz's fight also gained mainstream media attention from massive media outlets such as ESPN and USA Today, something that was unprecedented for mixed martial arts at that point in time. In fact, Danny Sheridan, the USA Today oddsmaker, was present during the card. UFC President Dana White credited Shamrock for the show's success. White said, "the reason we did so well on UFC 40 was because of Ken Shamrock and the fact that everyone knew who he was."

Long time UFC referee "Big" John McCarthy said that he felt UFC 40 was the turning point in whether or not the sport of MMA would survive in America.

"When that show (UFC 40) happened, I honestly felt like it was going to make it. Throughout the years, things were happening, and everything always looked bleak. It always looked like, this is it, this is going to be the last time. This is going to be the last year. But, when I was standing in the Octagon at UFC 40, I remember standing there before the Ortiz/Shamrock fight and looking around. The energy of that fight, it was phenomenal, and it was the first time I honestly said, it’s going to make it." -"Big" John McCarthy

== Results ==
Main Card
Weight class				Method	Round	Time	Notes
Light Heavyweight	Tito Ortiz (c)	def	Ken Shamrock	TKO (corner stoppage)	3	5:00	(Note: For the UFC Light Heavyweight Championship.)
Light Heavyweight	Chuck Liddell	def.	Renato Sobral	KO (head kick and punches)	1	2:55	(Note: UFC Light Heavyweight title eliminator only for Liddell.)
Welterweight	Matt Hughes (c)	def.	Gil Castillo	TKO (doctor stoppage)	1	5:00	(Note: For the UFC Welterweight Championship. Hughes wins via TKO (accidental headbutt) after round 1. Between rounds doctors ruled that the resulting cut was too severe to continue.)
Welterweight	Carlos Newton	def.	Pete Spratt	Submission (kimura)	1	1:45
Welterweight	Robbie Lawler	def.	Tiki Ghosn	TKO (punches)	1	1:29
Preliminary card
Heavyweight	Andrei Arlovski	def.	Ian Freeman	KO (punches)	1	1:25
Heavyweight	Vladimir Matyushenko	def.	Travis Wiuff	TKO (submission to punches)	1	4:10
Middleweight	Phillip Miller	def.	Mark Weir	Submission (rear-naked choke)	2	4:50

== Encyclopedia awards ==
The following fighters were honored in the October 2011 book titled UFC Encyclopedia.

- Fight of the Night: Tito Ortiz vs. Ken Shamrock
- Knockout of the Night: Chuck Liddell
- Submission of the Night: Carlos Newton

== See also ==
- Ultimate Fighting Championship
- List of UFC champions
- List of UFC events
- 2002 in UFC
- Latest UFC News
