= Miletich Fighting Systems =

Mixed martial arts training organization

- Est.: 1997
- Founded by: Pat Miletich
- Primary trainers: Pat Miletich; Steve Rusk; Nate Schroeder
- Past titleholders: Robbie Lawler; Barb Honchak; Spencer Fisher; Jeremy Horn; Matt Hughes; Pat Miletich; Jens Pulver; Tim Sylvia
- Training facilities: Bettendorf, Iowa

Miletich Fighting Systems (MFS) was established as a mixed martial arts (MMA) training organization by Pat Miletich in 1997. Based at Miletich's Ultimate Fitness gym in Bettendorf, Iowa, the camp trained fighters including Matt Hughes, Tim Sylvia, Jens Pulver, Robbie Lawler, and Jeremy Horn.

== Organization and structure ==
Miletich established the camp at his Ultimate Fitness gym in 1997; ESPN later described it as one of the early major MMA training schools. In 2009, Miletich said that MFS would continue operating from another facility in Bettendorf after the gym's closure. In 2012, Miletich announced a new ownership and management team for the organization.

== IFL fight team ==
Miletich Fighting Systems participated in the International Fight League (IFL) through the Quad City Silverbacks, who were coached by Miletich. The Silverbacks won the IFL team championship in both 2006 and 2007. When the IFL moved away from its city-based team format in 2008, the Silverbacks were rebranded as Miletich Fighting Systems. The league ceased operations on July 31, 2008.

== Notable fighters ==
The following fighters have been documented as members of, or as having trained with, Miletich Fighting Systems:

- Andre Roberts
- Sam Hoger
- Barb Honchak
- Bart Palaszewski
- Ben Rothwell
- Brad Imes
- Corey Hill
- Dave Menne
- Drew McFedries
- Jason Black
- Jason Reinhardt
- Jason Pierce
- Jens Pulver
- Jeremy Horn
- Josh Neer
- Justin Eilers
- LC Davis
- LaVerne Clark
- Mark Hughes
- Matt Hughes
- Mike Ciesnolevicz
- Mike Whitehead
- Robbie Lawler
- Rory Markham
- Spencer Fisher
- Tim Sylvia
- Tony Fryklund
