= Mark Hughes (fighter) =

American mixed martial arts fighter

- Born: October 13, 1973 (age 53); Hillsboro, Illinois, U.S.
- Other names: Cole Sommers Daddie
- Height: 5 ft 9 in (1.75 m)
- Weight: 185 lb (84 kg; 13.2 st)
- Division: Middleweight
- Style: Wrestling
- Fighting out of: Hillsboro, Illinois
- Team: Miletich Fighting Systems

Mixed martial arts record
- Total: 8
- Wins: 6
- By knockout: 2
- By submission: 2
- By decision: 2
- Losses: 2
- By submission: 1
- By decision: 1

Other information
- Notable relatives: Matt Hughes (brother)
- Mixed martial arts record from Sherdog

Mark R. Hughes (born October 13, 1973) is an American former mixed martial artist. He trained with the Miletich Fighting Systems along with his twin brother, UFC Hall of Famer and former two-time UFC Welterweight Champion, Matt Hughes.

Soon after fighting in the UFC, Mark decided that it just wasn't for him and he went back to his family, the farm and his construction company (Hughes Construction).

== Personal life ==
Mark is five minutes younger than his twin brother Matt. Matt and Mark have an older sister, Beth Ulricy.

Mark and his wife Emily have two sons and one daughter.

== Mixed martial arts record ==
Professional record breakdown
8 matches	6 wins	2 losses
By knockout	3	0
By submission	1	1
By decision	2	1

Res.	Record	Opponent	Method	Event	Date	Round	Time	Location	Notes
Win	6–2	Leo Sylvest	Submission (armbar)	Extreme Challenge 51	August 2, 2003	1	4:49	Saint Charles, Illinois, United States	
Loss	5–2	Joe Geromiller	Submission (rear-naked choke)	Extreme Challenge Trials: 2000 US MMA National Championships	January 20, 2001	2	4:12	Springfield, Illinois, United States	
Win	5–1	Alex Stiebling	Decision (unanimous)	UFC 28	November 17, 2000	2	5:00	Atlantic City, New Jersey, United States	
Win	4–1	Matthew Torrez	Decision (unanimous)	Extreme Challenge 36	August 26, 2000	1	15:00	Davenport, Iowa, United States	
Win	3–1	Andrew Neil	TKO (submission to punches)	Extreme Challenge 36	August 26, 2000	1	1:29	Davenport, Iowa, United States	
Win	2–1	Neal Binkley	TKO (punches)	Extreme Challenge 33	June 10, 2000	1	1:01	Council Bluffs, Iowa, United States	
Win	1–1	Ron Fields	TKO (punches)	Extreme Challenge 32	May 21, 2000	1	1:46	Springfield, Illinois, United States	
Loss	0–1	Brian Gassaway	Decision (split)	JKD Challenge 3	April 24, 1999	N/A	N/A	Chicago, Illinois, United States	
