= Phillip Miller =

American mixed martial artist and police officer

- Born: February 20, 1979 (age 47); Utah, U.S.
- Height: 5 ft 11 in (1.80 m)
- Weight: 182 lb (83 kg; 13 st 0 lb)
- Division: Middleweight
- Fighting out of: Hesperia, California, U.S.
- Team: Williams Combat Grappling
- Years active: 2000–2003

Mixed martial arts record
- Total: 16
- Wins: 16
- By knockout: 10
- By submission: 2
- By decision: 4
- Losses: 0

Other information
- Occupation: Police officer
- Mixed martial arts record from Sherdog

Phillip Miller (born February 20, 1979) is an American retired mixed martial artist. A professional competitor from 2000 to 2003, he fought in the UFC and various regional promotions, retiring undefeated with a record of 16–0. At the time of his retirement, he was ranked #6 in the world by Fight Matrix.

== Early life ==
Miller was born on February 20, 1979, in Utah, and grew up in Hesperia, California. Both of his parents were schoolteachers, and his father served as the wrestling coach at Serrano High School, where Miller began wrestling competitively. Miller qualified for the California state wrestling championships as a junior and finished eighth in the state during his senior year.

After graduating high school, Miller attended Brigham Young University and wrestled there for one year. However, his collegiate wrestling career was cut short when his father was severely injured in a car accident, leaving him bedridden. Miller returned to California to assist with coaching his father's high school wrestling team.

During this time, Miller was introduced to mixed martial arts through his friendship with a young Joe Stevenson, who was already competing professionally. Stevenson invited Miller to train at Williams Combat Grappling, a gym run by UFC veteran and King of the Cage founder Tedd Williams. There, Miller trained alongside future MMA professionals Stevenson and Jason Lambert, eventually transitioning into professional mixed martial arts himself.

== Mixed martial arts career ==
=== Early career ===
Miller made his professional debut in January 2000, defeating Ben Sablan in San Diego by forcing a submission due to strikes. Later that year, he competed in an International Fighting Championship tournament in Friant, California, headlined by Chuck Liddell. In his opening match, Miller earned a hard-fought unanimous decision victory over future Strikeforce champion and UFC veteran Jake Shields. He went on to submit Rick Kerns by armlock in the tournament finals.

Miller continued his undefeated run through regional promotions, including Gladiator Challenge, IFC, King of the Cage, and the World Vale Tudo Championship. He notably won a three-fight tournament in 2002 under the World Vale Tudo Championship promotion in Jamaica. During this period, Miller gained recognition for his wrestling-heavy style and dominant ground-and-pound tactics, as exemplified in his victory over Pride FC veteran Shungo Oyama, who sustained significant injuries during their bout.

=== Ultimate Fighting Championship ===
Miller signed with the UFC in 2002. He debuted at UFC 38 in London, defeating James Zikic by unanimous decision. Miller returned at UFC 40 later that year, submitting British fighter Mark Weir via rear-naked choke in the second round.

=== Final fight and retirement ===
Miller fought his last bout on March 28, 2003, at HOOKnSHOOT Absolute Fighting Championships 2, defeating Moacir Oliveira by unanimous decision and improving his professional record to 16–0. After witnessing the serious injuries he inflicted on opponents such as Oliveira and Oyama, and mindful of potential long-term damage to his own health, Miller chose to retire from MMA at age 24, citing personal concerns and contractual frustrations with the UFC. He remains one of the few fighters to retire from professional MMA undefeated.

After retiring from mixed martial arts, Miller began a career with the Los Angeles Police Department, becoming a patrol officer in the San Fernando Valley.

== Mixed martial arts record ==
Professional record breakdown
16 matches	16 wins	0 losses
By knockout	10	0
By submission	2	0
By decision	4	0

Res.	Record	Opponent	Method	Event	Date	Round	Time	Location	Notes
Win	16–0	Moacir Oliveira	Decision (unanimous)	HOOKnSHOOT – Absolute Fighting Championships 2	March 28, 2003	3	5:00	Fort Lauderdale, Florida, United States	
Win	15–0	Mark Weir	Submission (rear-naked choke)	UFC 40	November 22, 2002	2	4:50	Las Vegas, Nevada, United States	
Win	14–0	James Zikic	Decision (unanimous)	UFC 38	July 13, 2002	3	5:00	London, England	
Win	13–0	Roberto Ramirez	TKO (submission to punches)	KOTC 13: Revolution	May 17, 2002	1	4:14	Reno, Nevada, United States	
Win	12–0	Marcelo Vieira	TKO (corner stoppage)	WVC 14: World Vale Tudo Championship 14	March 7, 2002	1	12:15	Runaway Bay, Jamaica	
Win	11–0	Brian Foster	TKO (submission to punches)	WVC 14: World Vale Tudo Championship 14	March 7, 2002	1	4:40	Runaway Bay, Jamaica	
Win	10–0	Luiz Claudio das Dores	TKO (submission to punches)	WVC 14: World Vale Tudo Championship 14	March 7, 2002	1	4:00	Runaway Bay, Jamaica	
Win	9–0	John Hosegood	KO (punches)	KOTC 12: Cold Blood	February 9, 2002	1	3:43	San Jacinto, California, United States	
Win	8–0	Cruz Chacon	TKO (submission to punches)	Gladiator Challenge 7: Casualties of War	November 4, 2001	2	1:24	Colusa, California, United States	
Win	7–0	John Herrera	TKO (submission to punches)	Gladiator Challenge 5: Rumble in the Rockies	August 19, 2001	1	3:28	Denver, Colorado, United States	
Win	6–0	David Contrell	KO (punches)	Gladiator Challenge 4: Collision at Colusa	June 17, 2001	1	2:20	Colusa, California, United States	
Win	5–0	Shungo Oyama	TKO (punches)	KOTC 8: Bombs Away	April 29, 2001	2	3:00	Williams, California, United States	
Win	4–0	Kurt Rojo	Decision	Gladiator Challenge 1	December 9, 2000	3	5:00	San Jacinto, California, United States	
Win	3–0	Rick Kerns	Submission (armlock)	IFC Warriors Challenge 9	July 18, 2000	1	1:45	Friant, California, United States	
Win	2–0	Jake Shields	Decision (unanimous)	IFC Warriors Challenge 9	July 18, 2000	2	8:00	Friant, California, United States	
Win	1–0	Ben Sablan	TKO (submission to punches)	Caged 2000	January 22, 2000	1	7:33	San Diego, California, United States	
