= Renato Sobral =

Brazilian kickboxer and mixed martial arts fighter

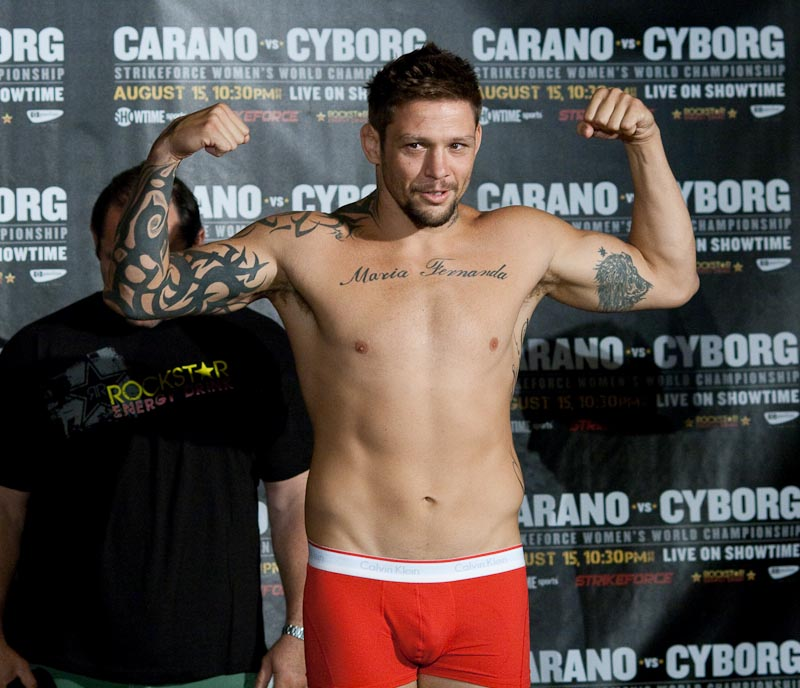
- Sobral at the weigh-in before the Strikeforce: Carano vs. Cyborg event in 2009
- Born: Renato Sobral da Cunha; 7 September 1975 (age 51); Rio de Janeiro, Brazil
- Other names: Babalu
- Height: 6 ft 0 in (1.83 m)
- Weight: 205 lb (93 kg; 14 st 9 lb)
- Division: Light Heavyweight; Heavyweight
- Reach: 76 in (193 cm)
- Fighting out of: Garden Grove, California, United States
- Team: Gracie Barra Cerritos; Kings MMA; Babalu's Iron Gym
- Rank: Black belt in Luta Livre under Marco Ruas; Third degree black belt in Brazilian Jiu-Jitsu under Carlos Gracie Jr. and Roberto Correa; Black prajied in Muay Thai
- Years active: 1997–2013

Mixed martial arts record
- Total: 49
- Wins: 37
- By knockout: 9
- By submission: 15
- By decision: 13
- Losses: 12
- By knockout: 7
- By submission: 1
- By decision: 4

Other information
- Mixed martial arts record from Sherdog

Renato Sobral da Cunha (Brazilian Portuguese: [ʁeˈnatu soˈbɾaw]; born 7 September 1975), also known as "Babalu", is a retired Brazilian Luta Livre submission grappler, mixed martial artist, and was the former Strikeforce Light Heavyweight Champion. Sobral previously fought in the Ultimate Fighting Championship, where he posted a 6–4 record and has also competed for Bellator, RINGS, Jungle Fight, Cage Rage, Affliction, and ONE Championship. He is the Head Instructor of Babalu's Iron Gym Cerritos and has a Luta Livre black belt under Marco Ruas and also a Brazilian jiu-jitsu black belt under Carlos Gracie Jr.

== Background ==
Sobral is originally from Rio de Janeiro, Brazil and began competing in wrestling from a young age of nine. Sobral a three-time Brazilian National Wrestling Champion in 1998, 1999, and 2000. Sobral joined the Gracie Barra Combat Team and trained in Ruas Vale Tudo, a martial arts system developed by Marco Ruas.

== Mixed martial arts career ==
=== Early career ===
Sobral made his professional mixed martial arts debut on 27 September 1997 in his hometown of Rio de Janeiro. He won all three of his fights on the same night by strikes and then had a one-fight stint in International Vale Tudo before fighting in Brazilian Vale Tudo on 24 July 1999. Sobral again won all three of his fights that night and then made his debut in the Japanese RINGS organization.

=== RINGS ===
Sobral made his RINGS debut against Georgian wrestler Zaza Tkeshelashvili and won via kimura arm submission. He followed this up with a unanimous decision win over British kickboxer Lee Hasdell.

Still undefeated, he participated in the King of Kings 1999 Final, winning his first two fights of the day before being handed his first career loss by Dan Henderson. Sobral lost the fight via minority decision, two judges scored the bout a draw while a third judge scored the bout in Henderson's favor.

Sobral then won his next four consecutive fights before losing to Valentijn Overeem by a toe hold submission.

After a one-fight stint in the UFC, he fought in RINGS three more times. He defeated Kiyoshi Tamura via majority decision, followed this up with another majority decision win over Tsuyoshi Kohsaka. Sobral then faced Fedor Emilianenko at the 10th Anniversary show and lost via unanimous decision.

=== Ultimate Fighting Championship ===
Sobral made his UFC debut at UFC 28 against former UFC Heavyweight Champion Maurice Smith. Sobral won the fight via unanimous decision.

Sobral next fought Kevin Randleman at UFC 35 on 11 January 2002. He lost via unanimous decision.

Sobral's next fight was against Elvis Sinosic at UFC 38 on 13 July 2002. He won via unanimous decision.

Sobral next fought Chuck Liddell at UFC 40 on 22 November 2002. He lost via head kick in the first round.

He left the UFC in early 2003 and fought for minor and local promotions until his return in 2005.

Sobral returned to the UFC at UFC 52 against Travis Wiuff on 16 April 2005. He won the fight via armbar in the second round.

Sobral next fought future Middleweight and Light Heavyweight title challenger Chael Sonnen at UFC 55 on 7 October 2005. He won the fight via triangle choke in the second round.

Sobral's next fight was at UFC 57 against Mike Van Arsdale on 4 February 2006. He won the fight via rear naked choke in the first round.

At UFC 62, Sobral was defeated by Chuck Liddell in a rematch for the UFC Light Heavyweight Championship. The match was stopped as a technical knockout at 95 seconds into the first round.

Following his loss to Liddell, Sobral faced Jason Lambert at UFC 68. Sobral was knocked out in the second round.

=== UFC 74 controversy ===
Sobral's next fight was at UFC 74 against David Heath. The first round consisted of Sobral ground and pounding Heath. In the second round, he opened a cut on Heath's forehead which bled profusely. Sobral secured another takedown and then worked to an anaconda choke. Heath tapped out, but Sobral continued to hold the anaconda choke, ignoring referee Steve Mazzagatti's commands and resisting his attempts to break the hold. Sobral did not release the choke until Heath passed out from hypoxia. During his post-fight interview, Sobral told UFC commentator Joe Rogan that he was aware that Heath had tapped, but "he (Heath) has to learn respect. He deserved that. He called me motherfucker." In his dressing room after the fight, Sobral spoke to Las Vegas Journal-Review columnist Ed Graney. Sobral then mocked the crowd for booing him, saying "The crowd didn't like it? Who cares? At least they had a reaction."

On 30 August 2007, Sobral was released from his contractual obligations by the UFC due to his actions at UFC 74, with UFC President Dana White calling Sobral's actions "completely unacceptable. This is the fight game and shit happens. But no way can you do what he did." White also supported the fans attitude towards Sobral after the fight. "I think you saw the response from the fans. Babalu was a fan favorite. They turned on him immediately." Additionally, the Nevada State Athletic Commission withheld $25,000 of Sobral's $50,000 fight purse and convened a hearing to deal with both his holding the choke and ignoring Mazzagatti's orders.

=== Strikeforce and Affliction ===
After the termination of his deal with the UFC, Renato Sobral was courted by numerous promotions looking to sign him. During the 29 September Strikeforce event at the Playboy Mansion it was announced that Sobral had signed a non-exclusive deal with Strikeforce. It has since been revealed that he signed two more non-exclusive deals with Hardcore Championship Fighting and Xcess Fighting. Sobral also later competed in an event for the Ring of Fire promotion, defeating K-1 veteran Rodney Faverus by submission (arm triangle choke).

Sobral was scheduled to fight fellow UFC veteran Vernon "Tiger" White in a match to crown the first WCO Light Heavyweight Champion. However, because the show's promoters were unable to secure adequate funding to pay the fighters, the show was canceled at the last minute by the California State Athletic Commission.

Sobral then signed with Affliction Entertainment's MMA promotion and appeared at Affliction: Banned on 19 July, defeating Mike Whitehead by unanimous decision. Sobral's next fight was against Bobby Southworth in San Jose, California on 21 November for the Strikeforce promotion. Babalu defeated Southworth via TKO due to a cut over the right eye in between round one and two, making him the Strikeforce Light Heavyweight Champion.

Sobral next fought his second fight for Affliction, this time against Sokoudjou at Affliction: Day of Reckoning on 24 January 2009 in a light heavyweight fight. The fight ended in the second round when Babalu submitted Sokoudjou with a D'arce choke. After his victory he showed an interest in fighting former UFC Light Heavyweight Champion, Tito Ortiz.

Sobral was set to fight fellow Brazilian Rafael "Feijao" Cavalcante at the past event Strikeforce Presents: Lawler Vs. Shields in St. Louis, Missouri on 6 June 2009, but the bout was scratched. The bout would have been for the Strikeforce Light Heavyweight Championship.

Sobral was next set to make his third appearance for Affliction in a fight against Gegard Mousasi at Affliction: Trilogy, but the event was canceled after losing its main event. The fight was then moved to Strikeforce's 15 August card, Strikeforce: Carano vs. Cyborg and changed into a bout for the Strikeforce Light Heavyweight Championship with Sobral as the titleholder. Sobral lost the title to Mousasi via knockout in the first round.

Sobral last fought Robbie Lawler in a 195 lbs Catchweight bout on 16 June 2010 at Strikeforce: Los Angeles. Renato Sobral won via unanimous decision.

After defeating Robbie Lawler it was believed that Sobral would face Muhammed Lawal for the Strikeforce Light Heavyweight title. However, in his post-fight interview Sobral stated that he would not fight Lawal and instead requested a rematch with Dan Henderson who he fought over ten years ago.

Sobral's request was later fulfilled and he fought Dan Henderson at Strikeforce: Henderson vs. Babalu II on 4 December 2010. Sobral was knocked out in the first round.

=== ONE Championship ===
In late December 2011, After one year of inactivity Sobral signed an exclusive deal with Singaporean MMA promotion ONE Championship also known as ONE FC, ONE FC officials stated that Sobral has "global exclusivity" with the promotion. Sobral was slated to fight Melvin Manhoef on 31 March 2012 at ONE Fighting Championship 3 which was to be held at the Singapore Indoor Stadium in Kallang, Singapore but the two sides were unable to agree on a weight and he instead became the wrestling coach in Wanderlei Silva's team on The Ultimate Fighter: Brazil.

Sobral returned to action in the main event of ONE FC 4 on 23 June. He defeated Tatsuya Mizuno at ONE FC: Destiny of Warriors in Kuala Lumpur, via an armbar submission in the first round. The stoppage came less than a minute into the first round.

=== Bellator Fighting Championships ===
Sobral faced Combat Sambo Russia National Champion Mikhail Zayats on 17 January 2013 at Bellator 85. He lost the fight via TKO in the first round.

Despite the loss, Sobral competed in Bellator's Light Heavyweight summer series tournament on Spike. He faced Jacob Noe in the opening round of a 4-man tournament at Bellator 96 on 19 June 2013. Sobral lost when the referee stopped the fight for a standing TKO. After the fight, Sobral announced his retirement from MMA.

== Submission grappling career ==
=== Metamoris ===
Dean Lister and Renato Sobral fought to a draw at Metamoris 3 in a submission grappling match.

Chael Sonnen and Renato Sobral fought to a draw in a trilogy fight at Metamoris 6 in a submission grappling match.

== Personal life ==
Sobral and his wife Natasha have two daughters, who were born in May 2009. He has both their names tattooed on him.

His nickname comes from a brand of bubblegum that he used to chew (Bubbaloo).

In October 2008 he opened his own gym, Gracie Barra Cerritos, in Cerritos, California. In 2010, his gym changed to Babalu's Iron Gym.

Sobral was awarded his Brazilian jiu-jitsu third degree black belt in August 2017 from Roberto "Gordo" Correa.

Appeared in the video Still I Rise by the American heavy metal band Shadows Fall.

In May 2019 Sobral revealed that he was suffering from symptoms consistent with early onset of CTE.

== Championships and accomplishments ==
=== Mixed martial arts ===
- Strikeforce
  - Strikeforce Light Heavyweight Championship (One time)
- Ultimate Fighting Championship
  - UFC Encyclopedia Awards
    - Submission of the Night (One time) vs. Chael Sonnen
- Fighting Network RINGS
  - 1999 RINGS King of Kings Tournament Runner-up
- International Fighting Championships
  - International Fighting Championships Light Heavyweight Tournament Winner

=== Amateur wrestling ===
- International Federation of Associated Wrestling Styles
  - 2001 Pan American Championships Senior Freestyle (6th Place)
- Confederação Brasileira de Lutas Associadas
  - Brazil Senior Freestyle National Championship (1998)

== Mixed martial arts record ==
Professional record breakdown
49 matches	37 wins	12 losses
By knockout	9	7
By submission	15	1
By decision	13	4

Res.	Record	Opponent	Method	Event	Date	Round	Time	Location	Notes
Loss	37–12	Jacob Noe	TKO (punches)	Bellator 96	19 June 2013	3	3:32	Thackerville, Oklahoma, United States	Bellator 2013 Summer Series Light Heavyweight Tournament Semifinal.
Loss	37–11	Mikhail Zayats	TKO (punches)	Bellator 85	17 January 2013	1	4:49	Irvine, California, United States	Bellator Season Eight Light Heavyweight Tournament Quarterfinal
Win	37–10	Tatsuya Mizuno	Submission (armbar)	ONE FC: Destiny of Warriors	24 June 2012	1	0:31	Kuala Lumpur, Malaysia	
Loss	36–10	Dan Henderson	KO (punches)	Strikeforce: Henderson vs. Babalu II	4 December 2010	1	1:53	Missouri, United States	Strikeforce Light Heavyweight title eliminator.
Win	36–9	Robbie Lawler	Decision (unanimous)	Strikeforce: Los Angeles	16 June 2010	3	5:00	California, United States	195 lb Catchweight bout
Loss	35–9	Gegard Mousasi	KO (punches)	Strikeforce: Carano vs. Cyborg	15 August 2009	1	1:00	California, United States	Lost the Strikeforce Light Heavyweight Championship.
Win	35–8	Rameau Thierry Sokoudjou	Submission (D'Arce choke)	Affliction: Day of Reckoning	24 January 2009	2	2:36	California, United States	
Win	34–8	Bobby Southworth	TKO (doctor stoppage)	Strikeforce: Destruction	21 November 2008	1	5:00	California, United States	Won the Strikeforce Light Heavyweight Championship.
Win	33–8	Mike Whitehead	Decision (unanimous)	Affliction: Banned	19 July 2008	3	5:00	California, United States	
Win	32–8	Rodney Glunder	Submission (arm-triangle choke)	Ring of Fire 30: Babalu vs. Glunder	9 December 2007	3	3:31	Colorado, United States	
Win	31–8	David Heath	Technical Submission (anaconda choke)	UFC 74	25 August 2007	2	3:30	Nevada, United States	Cut from the UFC post-fight after holding on to the submission too long.
Loss	30–8	Jason Lambert	KO (punch)	UFC 68	3 March 2007	2	3:26	Ohio, United States	Fight of the Night.
Loss	30–7	Chuck Liddell	TKO (punches)	UFC 62: Liddell vs. Sobral 2	26 August 2006	1	1:35	Nevada, United States	For the UFC Light Heavyweight Championship.
Win	30–6	Mike van Arsdale	Submission (rear-naked choke)	UFC 57: Liddell vs. Couture 3	4 February 2006	1	2:21	Nevada, United States	
Win	29–6	Chael Sonnen	Submission (triangle choke)	UFC 55: Fury	7 October 2005	2	1:20	Connecticut, United States	
Win	28–6	Travis Wiuff	Submission (armbar)	UFC 52: Couture vs Liddell 2	16 April 2005	2	0:24	Nevada, United States	
Win	27–6	Pierre Guillet	TKO (submission to punches)	Cage Rage 10	26 February 2005	1	1:57	London, United Kingdom	
Win	26–6	Cyrille Diabaté	Submission (guillotine choke)	Cage Rage 9	27 November 2004	1	3:38	London, United Kingdom	
Win	25–6	José Landi-Jons	Decision (unanimous)	Jungle Fight 3	23 October 2004	3	5:00	Manaus, Brazil	
Win	24–6	Jeremy Horn	Decision (unanimous)	IFC: Global Domination	6 September 2003	3	5:00	Colorado, United States	
Win	23–6	Maurício Rua	Submission (guillotine choke)	IFC: Global Domination	6 September 2003	3	3:07	Colorado, United States	
Win	22–6	Trevor Prangley	Decision (unanimous)	IFC: Global Domination	6 September 2003	3	5:00	Colorado, United States	
Win	21–6	Marcelo Azevedo	Decision (unanimous)	Heat FC 1: Genesis	31 July 2003	3	5:00	Rio Grande do Norte, Brazil	
Loss	20–6	Chael Sonnen	Decision	Hitman Fighting 3	2 May 2003	N/A	N/A	Santa Ana, California, United States	
Loss	20–5	Chuck Liddell	KO (head kick)	UFC 40	22 November 2002	1	2:55	Nevada, United States	
Win	20–4	Elvis Sinosic	Decision (unanimous)	UFC 38	13 July 2002	3	5:00	London, United Kingdom	
Loss	19–4	Kevin Randleman	Decision (unanimous)	UFC 35	11 January 2002	3	5:00	Connecticut, United States	
Loss	19–3	Fedor Emelianenko	Decision (unanimous)	Rings: 10th Anniversary	11 August 2001	2	5:00	Tokyo, Japan	
Win	19–2	Tsuyoshi Kohsaka	Decision (majority)	Rings: World Title Series 2	15 June 2001	2	5:00	Tokyo, Japan	
Win	18–2	Kiyoshi Tamura	Decision (majority)	Rings: King of Kings 2000 Final	24 February 2001	2	5:00	Tokyo, Japan	
Win	17–2	Maurice Smith	Decision (unanimous)	UFC 28	17 November 2000	3	5:00	New Jersey, United States	Heavyweight Bout
Loss	16–2	Valentijn Overeem	Submission (toe hold)	Rings: King of Kings 2000 Block A	9 October 2000	1	2:19	Tokyo, Japan	
Win	16–1	Tariel Bitsadze	Submission (armbar)	Rings: King of Kings 2000 Block A	9 October 2000	1	2:58	Tokyo, Japan	
Win	15–1	Hiromitsu Kanehara	Decision (unanimous)	Rings: Millennium Combine 2	15 June 2000	2	5:00	Tokyo, Japan	
Win	14–1	Jacob Zobnin	Submission (rear-naked choke)	Rings Russia: Russia vs. The World	20 May 2000	1	3:20	Tokyo, Japan	
Win	13–1	Travis Fulton	Submission (armbar)	Rings: Millennium Combine 1	20 April 2000	1	4:49	Tokyo, Japan	
Loss	12–1	Dan Henderson	Decision (majority)	Rings: King of Kings 1999 Final	26 February 2000	2	5:00	Tokyo, Japan	
Win	12–0	Kiyoshi Tamura	Decision (majority)	Rings: King of Kings 1999 Final	26 February 2000	2	5:00	Tokyo, Japan	
Win	11–0	Mikhail Ilyukhin	Submission (armbar)	Rings: King of Kings 1999 Final	26 February 2000	3	0:40	Tokyo, Japan	
Win	10–0	Brad Kohler	KO (soccer kick)	WEF: Goin' Platinum	15 January 2000	2	0:50	Georgia, United States	
Win	9–0	Lee Hasdell	Decision (unanimous)	Rings: King of Kings 1999 Block A	28 October 1999	2	5:00	Tokyo, Japan	
Win	8–0	Zaza Tkeshelashvili	Submission (kimura)	Rings: King of Kings 1999 Block A	28 October 1999	2	1:11	Tokyo, Japan	
Win	7–0	Dario Amorim	TKO (submission to punches)	BVF 14: Circuito Brasileiro de Vale Tudo 5	24 July 1999	1	2:14	Rio de Janeiro, Brazil	
Win	6–0	Pedro Otavio	TKO (submission to punches)	BVF 14: Circuito Brasileiro de Vale Tudo 5	24 July 1999	1	4:34	Rio de Janeiro, Brazil	
Win	5–0	Augusto Menezes Santos	Submission (americana)	BVF 14: Circuito Brasileiro de Vale Tudo 5	24 July 1999	1	0:56	Rio de Janeiro, Brazil	
Win	4–0	Fernando Cerchiari	KO (punches)	IVC 8: The Road Back to the Top	20 January 1999	1	4:41	Aracaju, Brazil	
Win	3–0	Marco Vinicios	TKO (retirement)	Desafio: Rio vs. São Paulo	27 September 1997	2	4:58	Rio de Janeiro, Brazil	
Win	2–0	Manoel Vicente	TKO (punches and stomp)	Desafio: Rio vs. São Paulo	27 September 1997	1	6:27	Rio de Janeiro, Brazil	
Win	1–0	Claudio Palma	TKO (submission to leg kicks)	Desafio: Rio vs. São Paulo	27 September 1997	1	2:08	Rio de Janeiro, Brazil	

== Submission grappling record ==
4 Matches, 0 Wins, 1 Losses, 3 Draws
Result	Rec.	Opponent	Method	Event	Date	Location
Draw	0–1–3	(United States) Clay Guida	Draw	Quintet Ultra	12 December 2019	(United States) Las Vegas, Nevada
Loss	0–1–2	(Brazil) Roberto Godoi	Decision · Points	BJJ Stars: Black Belt Edition	24 February 2019	São Paulo, Brazil
Draw	0–0–2	(United States) Chael Sonnen	Draw	Metamoris 6	9 May 2015	(United States) Los Angeles, California
Draw	0–0–1	(United States) Dean Lister	Draw	Metamoris 3	9 March 2014	(United States) Los Angeles, California

== See also ==
- List of male mixed martial artists
- List of ONE Championship alumni
- List of Bellator MMA alumni

Preceded by Bobby Southworth	2nd Strikeforce Light Heavyweight Champion; 21 November 2008 – 15 August 2009	Succeeded by Gegard Mousasi
