= Lincoln College (Illinois) =

Private college in Lincoln, Illinois, US, 1865–2022

Coordinates: 40°9′25.1″N 89°21′38.4″W

- Former name: Lincoln University
- Type: Private college
- Active: 1865–2022
- President: David Gerlach
- Faculty: 50
- Undergraduates: 800
- Location: Lincoln, Illinois, U.S.
- Colors: Purple & white
- Nickname: Lynx
- Sporting affiliations: NAIA – CCAC
- Website: lincolncollege.edu

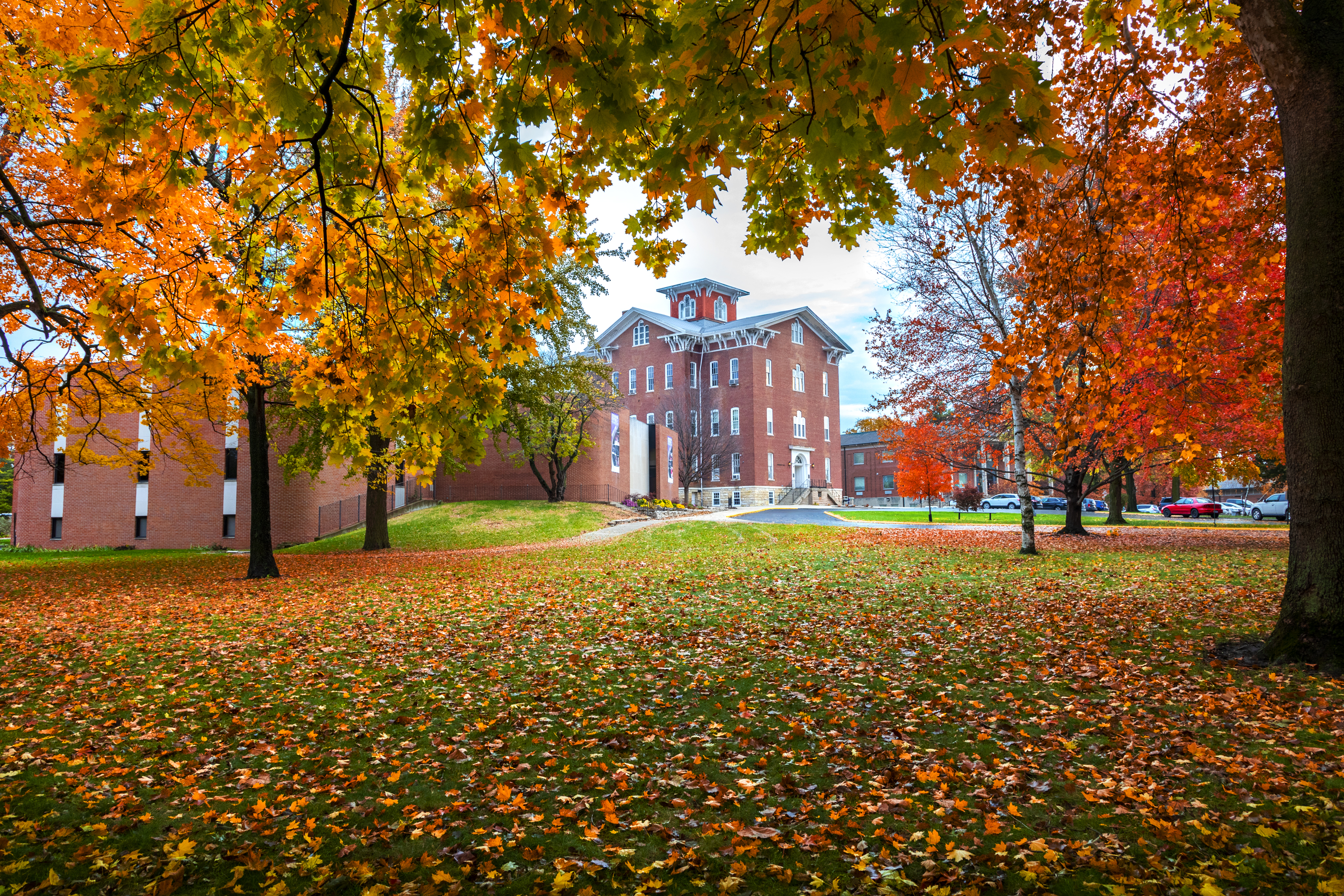
Fall at Lincoln College showing University Hall

Lincoln College was a private college from 1865 to 2022 in Lincoln, Illinois, United States. The Illinois Board of Higher Education serves as the custodian of records for the college following its closure.

The college offered associate, bachelor's, and master's programs. It maintained an extension site in Normal, Illinois, that provided adults with Accelerated Bridge to Education bachelor's degree programs. The college closed on May 13, 2022.

== History ==
Lincoln College was established as Lincoln University in 1865 by the Cumberland Presbyterian Church and was named after Abraham Lincoln. There were a few sites that were looked at as possibilities for the institution, before Lincoln, Illinois; however, in December 1864, the City of Lincoln was chosen.

On February 6, 1865, the Illinois General Assembly granted the charter that established the university. The groundbreaking for University Hall, the first college building, was held on Abraham Lincoln's last living birthday, six days after the charter had been granted; in September 1865 the building's foundation was completed, and the cornerstone was laid. In November 1866, the college opened its doors to men and women alike. In 1868, three people had earned their degrees.

In 1901, Lincoln College affiliated with the Decatur College and Industrial School (now Millikin University) in Decatur. The name of the school was changed from Lincoln University to Lincoln College of the James Millikin University. James Millikin, a wealthy Decatur livestock breeder, offered Lincoln University a $50,000 grant for a new building at the Lincoln campus if the school would turn over its charter. The $50,000 grant was on the condition that the citizens of Lincoln would raise $25,000 towards the new building project. The $25,000 was raised, and the $50,000 grant was provided to the Lincoln campus.

In 1929, Lincoln became a two-year junior college, no longer offering four-year degrees as it had done since its inception. Many junior colleges were created in the 1920s and 1930s. The move helped the college through the financial problems of the Great Depression and World War II.

The Lincoln College campus experienced substantial growth following World War II. The college had seven dorms, numerous classroom buildings, a library, and a new building dubbed the Lincoln Center, which hosted a gymnasium, state-of-the-art classrooms, and Lincoln Heritage Museum.

In 1974, Lincoln College received a license for radio station WLNX.

Since 2010, Lincoln has been recognized as a Predominantly Black Institution (PBI) by the U.S. Department of Education.

In 2015, David Gerlach was selected as the 22nd President of Lincoln College. Shortly after Gerlach's appointment, the Lincoln College Board of Trustees approved a plan to return Lincoln College to its roots as a full bachelor's degree-granting institution while retaining its associate degree programs.

In 2018, business programs at Lincoln College were consolidated under the new MacKinnon School of Business, named in honor of distinguished graduate and successful businessman Alexander "Sandy" MacKinnon.

On March 30, 2022, Lincoln College announced that, due to significantly decreased enrollment, the college would not be able to sustain itself past the semester and that, unless a "transformational donation or partnership" arose, the college would close on May 13 of that year. The school also blamed COVID-19 and a cyberattack for the closure. It was announced that the Illinois State Board of Education would take over student transcripts and records.

The Illinois Board of Higher Education serves as the custodian of records for the college following the its closure.

In 2025, the Illinois state budget included an allocation of $500,000 designated for Lincoln College despite the fact that the college had been closed for three years; the allocation had reportedly been rolled over since 2018.

== Academics ==
In 2022, the college offered several undergraduate programs and two graduate degrees.

The Higher Learning Commission accredited Lincoln College until its closure in May 2022, when the college voluntarily resigned its accreditation. In 2010, the school received accreditation from the North Central Association of Colleges and Schools for its Bachelor of Arts degree in theater. In 2013, the campus offered studies toward a Bachelor of Arts in Jazz Studies. The International Accreditation Council for Business Education accredited business programs.

== Locations ==
=== Lincoln campus ===
Students originated from 25 U.S. states and several countries, including Australia, China, England, France, Japan, Norway, and Sweden. Approximately 10 percent of students were from urban settings, 30 percent from rural areas, and 60 percent from the suburbs. The student-faculty ratio was 16:1, and most classes contained 16–20 students. There was a 75 percent rate of students graduating in two years. Also, 90 percent of those graduates transferred to a four-year institution the following semester.

=== Normal campus ===
Lincoln College-Normal opened in 1979 as an extension of the Lincoln campus to host the Accelerated Bridge to Education (ABE) program. The ABE program offered non-traditional students the opportunity to complete their bachelor's degree in an accelerated format one night a week with supplemental online work. The ABE program had campuses in Normal, Lincoln, Oglesby at Illinois Valley Community College, and in Peoria at Illinois Central College. More than 500 students were enrolled in the ABE program, with an average class size of 16 students and a student-faculty ratio of 14:1.

== Student life ==
=== Residence halls ===
As of 2022, the Lincoln College campus had several residence halls: traditional Carroll Hall (Carroll North and Carroll South), Hoyle Hall, and Olin-Sang Hall; suite-style Heritage Hall West and North; suite-style Heritage Hall South; and apartment-style Lynx Village. There was a former residence hall called Forsyth Hall that was demolished in 2001 to make way for the Heritage Halls.

=== Conservation biology ===
The G. Dennis Campbell Creekside Outdoor Center for Environmental Education is a 104-acre (42 ha) environmental education site located about 5 miles (8 km) north of Lincoln. This was the location where a student of Lincoln College, Judd McCullum, found Illinois' largest mammoth fossil.

== Athletics ==
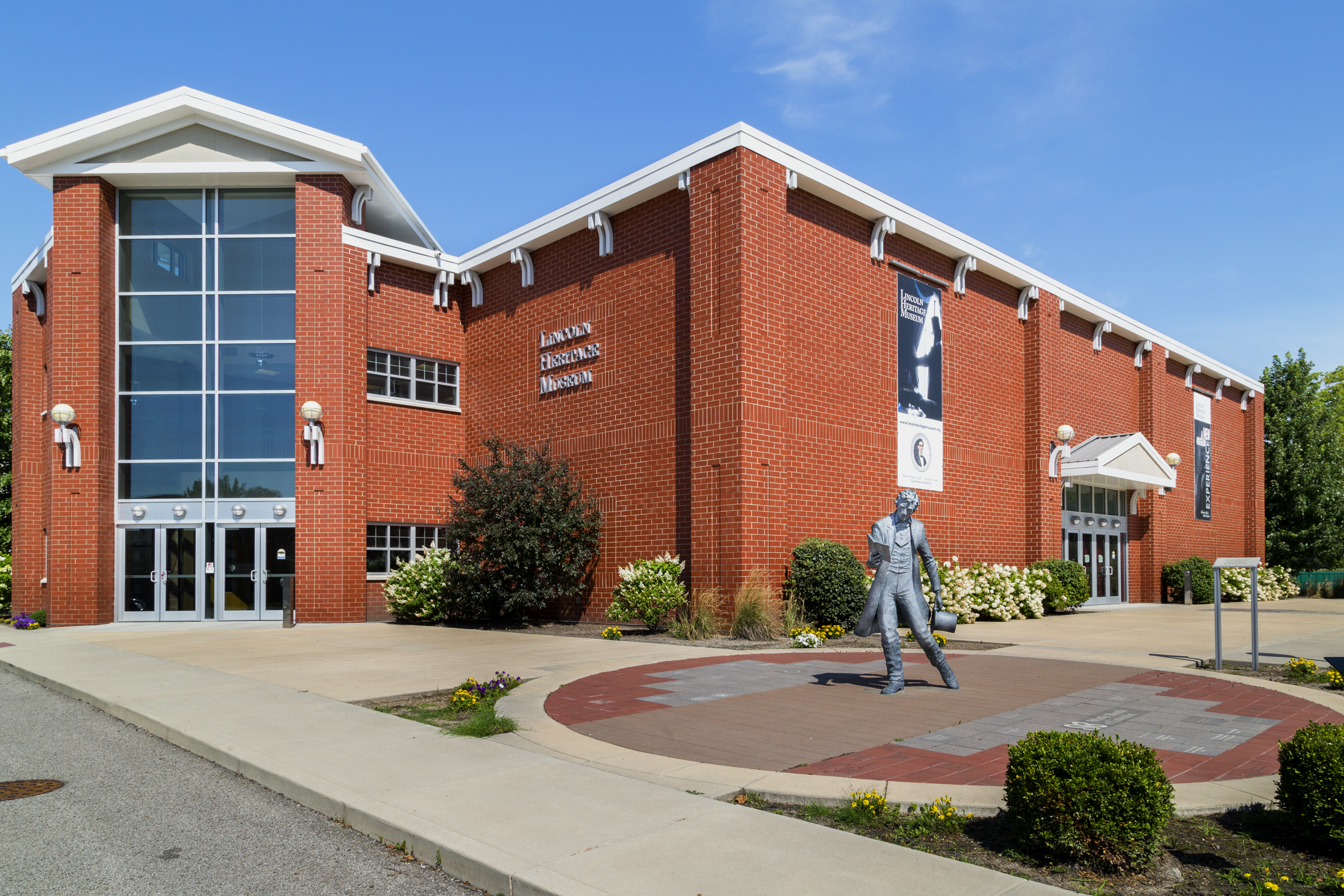
Gymnasium and Lincoln Heritage Museum

The college athletic teams were nicknamed the Lynx. The college was a member of the National Association of Intercollegiate Athletics (NAIA), primarily competing in the Chicagoland Collegiate Athletic Conference (CCAC) from 2020–21 to 2021–22.

The college began its first season in the NAIA as a four-year institution in 2018, joining the NAIA as an Independent within the Association of Independent Institutions (AII) from 2018–19 to 2019–20. Before joining the NAIA, the Lynxes were a member of the National Junior College Athletic Association (NJCAA), and its primary home conference was the Mid-West Athletic Conference (MWAC), stemming from its many years as a junior college. Before that, Lincoln College was a member of the Illinois Intercollegiate Athletic Conference (IIAC) from 1910–11 to 1927–28.

Lincoln competed in 19 intercollegiate varsity sports: Men's sports included baseball, basketball, bowling, cross country, golf, soccer, swimming & diving, track & field, volleyball, and wrestling, while women's sports included basketball, bowling, cross country, golf, softball, swimming & diving, track & field, volleyball, and wrestling. Club sports included cheerleading, dance, eSports, and men's volleyball.

=== Accomplishments ===
As a junior college, the Lincoln College wrestling team produced numerous NJCAA All-Americans, and the team often placed in top positions in the NJCAA Nationals, including national championships in 1989 and 1991. Lincoln College was also a basketball powerhouse, winning back-to-back Basketball National Championships in 2010 and 2011. In 2018, the Lynx Volleyball Team won the Men's Division II National Championship in the NCVF National Collegiate Club Volleyball Championship. The Lincoln College swimming & diving teams had attracted some athletes in recent years who have represented their home countries in the Olympics.

== Lincoln Heritage Museum ==
Lincoln Heritage Museum began as the Lincoln Room at Lincoln College in 1941 with a large donation of Abraham Lincoln artifacts from alumnus Judge Lawrence Stringer. Over time the collection grew with a notable donation from Robert Todd Lincoln Beckwith, the last descendant of the Lincoln family. As Lincoln College's collection expanded, the Lincoln Room became the Lincoln College Museum within the McKinstry Library. By 2014, the museum had outgrown its space again, and Lincoln Heritage Museum was formed in the newly constructed Lincoln Center building. As of May 2022, the museum planned to stay open after the college's closure.

== Notable alumni ==
- Corey Anderson, MMA Fighter, reality star
- Brenda Chapman, American writer, animation story artist, and director
- Kevin Gamble, basketball player for the Boston Celtics and the University of Iowa
- Matt Hughes, wrestler and retired professional mixed martial artist
- Edward Madigan, former U.S. Congressman
- Stephen Mandel, Canadian politician
- Brian Snitker, World Series-winning manager of MLB's Atlanta Braves
- Lawrence B. Stringer, Judge and U.S. Representative from Illinois
- Alice Bellvadore Sams Turner (1859–1915), physician, writer
- Albert R. Taylor, fifth president of the Kansas State Normal School in Kansas

== Closing ==
The college's closure garnered national news coverage about the causes and effects of the closure, including a lack of funding and effort to save the school. The school closure was ultimately effected by a cyber security attack.
