= UFC 38 =

UFC mixed martial arts event in 2002

UFC 38: Brawl at the Hall
- The poster for UFC 38: Brawl at the Hall
- Promotion: Ultimate Fighting Championship
- Date: July 13, 2002
- Venue: Royal Albert Hall
- City: London, United Kingdom
- Attendance: 3,800
- Buyrate: 45,000

Event chronology
UFC 37.5: As Real As It Gets	UFC 38: Brawl at the Hall	UFC 39: The Warriors Return

UFC 38: Brawl at the Hall was a mixed martial arts event held by the Ultimate Fighting Championship. It took place at the Royal Albert Hall in London, United Kingdom, on July 13, 2002. The event was seen live on pay-per-view in the United States, and was later released on home video.

== History ==
This was the first UFC event to be held in United Kingdom and the first event to be held outside the United States since UFC 29, which took place in Japan. The card was headlined by a UFC Welterweight Championship bout between champion Matt Hughes and former Welterweight titleholder Carlos Newton.

== Results ==
Main Card
Weight class				Method	Round	Time	Notes
Welterweight	Matt Hughes (c)	def.	Carlos Newton	TKO (punches)	4	3:27	(Note: For the UFC Welterweight Championship.)
Heavyweight	Ian Freeman	def.	Frank Mir	TKO (referee stoppage)	1	4:35
Middleweight	Mark Weir	def.	Eugene Jackson	KO (punch)	1	0:10
Lightweight	Genki Sudo	def.	Leigh Remedios	Submission (rear-naked choke)	2	1:38
Light Heavyweight	Phillip Miller	def.	James Zikic	Decision (unanimous) (29–28, 29–28, 29–28)	3	5:00
Preliminary card
Light Heavyweight	Renato Sobral	def.	Elvis Sinosic	Decision (unanimous) (30–27, 30–27, 30–26)	3	5:00
Light Heavyweight	Evan Tanner	def.	Chris Haseman	Decision (unanimous) (30–26, 30–26, 30–27)	3	5:00	(Note: Haseman was a last minute replacement for Vladimir Matyushenko, who was unable to participate due to an injury.)

== Encyclopedia awards ==
The following fighters were honored in the October 2011 book titled UFC Encyclopedia.

- Fight of the Night: Ian Freeman vs. Frank Mir
- Knockout of the Night: Mark Weir
- Submission of the Night: Genki Sudo

== See also ==
- Ultimate Fighting Championship
- List of UFC champions
- List of UFC events
- 2002 in UFC
