= Hoblit House =

Historic house in Illinois, United States

- U.S. National Register of Historic Places
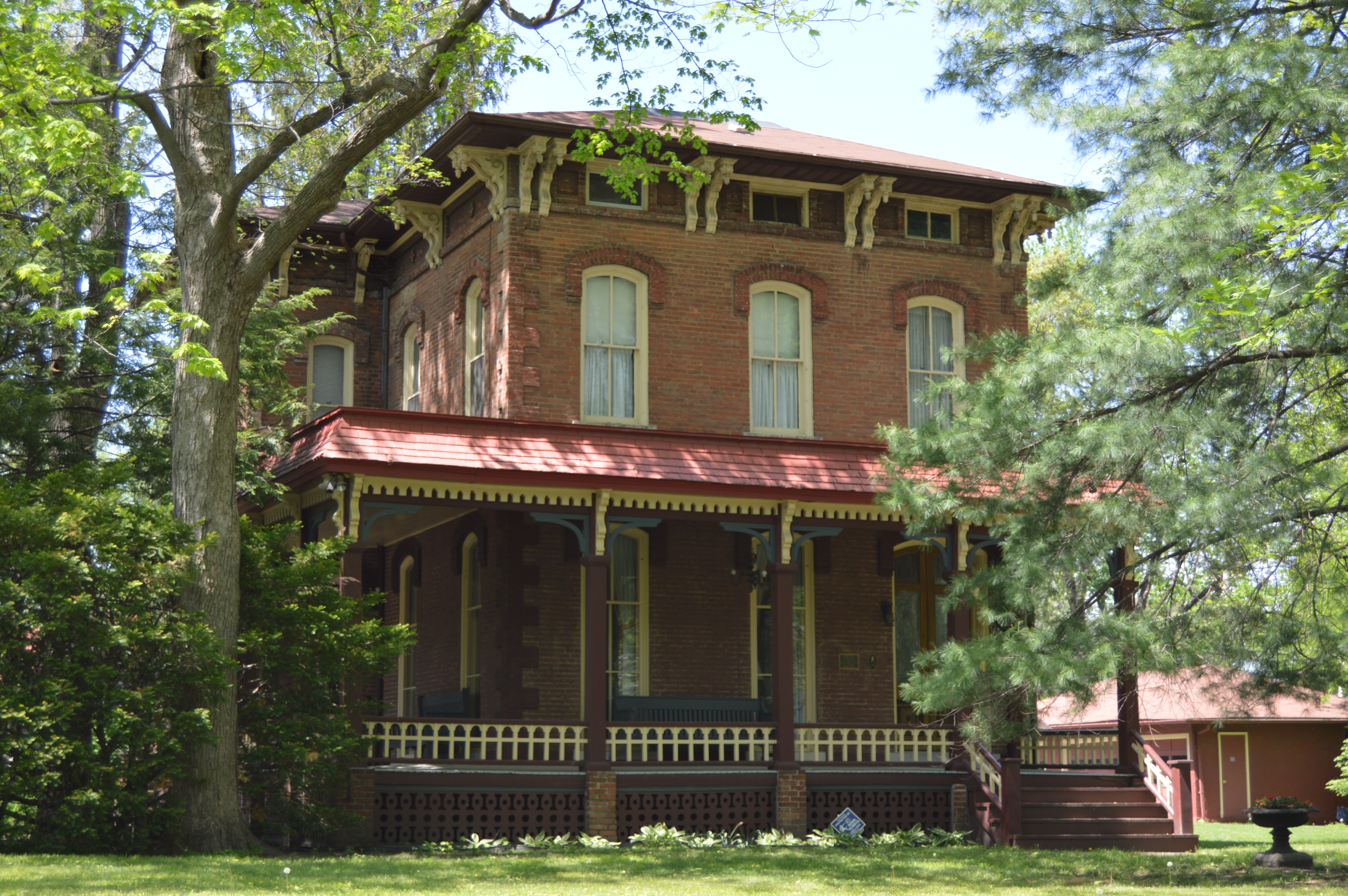
- Front of the house

- Location within Illinois Location within the United States
- Location: 505 College Ave., Lincoln, Illinois
- Coordinates: 40°9′14″N 89°21′52″W
- Area: less than one acre
- Built: 1874
- Architect: Gayle, George W.
- Architectural style: Italianate
- NRHP reference No.: 07000454
- Added to NRHP: May 22, 2007

The Hoblit House is a historic house located at 505 College Ave. in Lincoln, Illinois. The house was constructed in 1874 for Harrison and Matilda Schuler. Architect George W. Gale designed the house in the Italianate style. The design features an asymmetrical cruciform plan, tall, narrow arched windows, a cornice with decorative bracketing, and quoins at the corners. In 1882, Frank Hoblit, a prominent Logan County banker, bought the house, which he occupied until his 1914 death.

The house was added to the National Register of Historic Places on May 22, 2007.
