= Theodore H. O. Mattfeldt House =

Historic house in Illinois, United States

- U.S. National Register of Historic Places
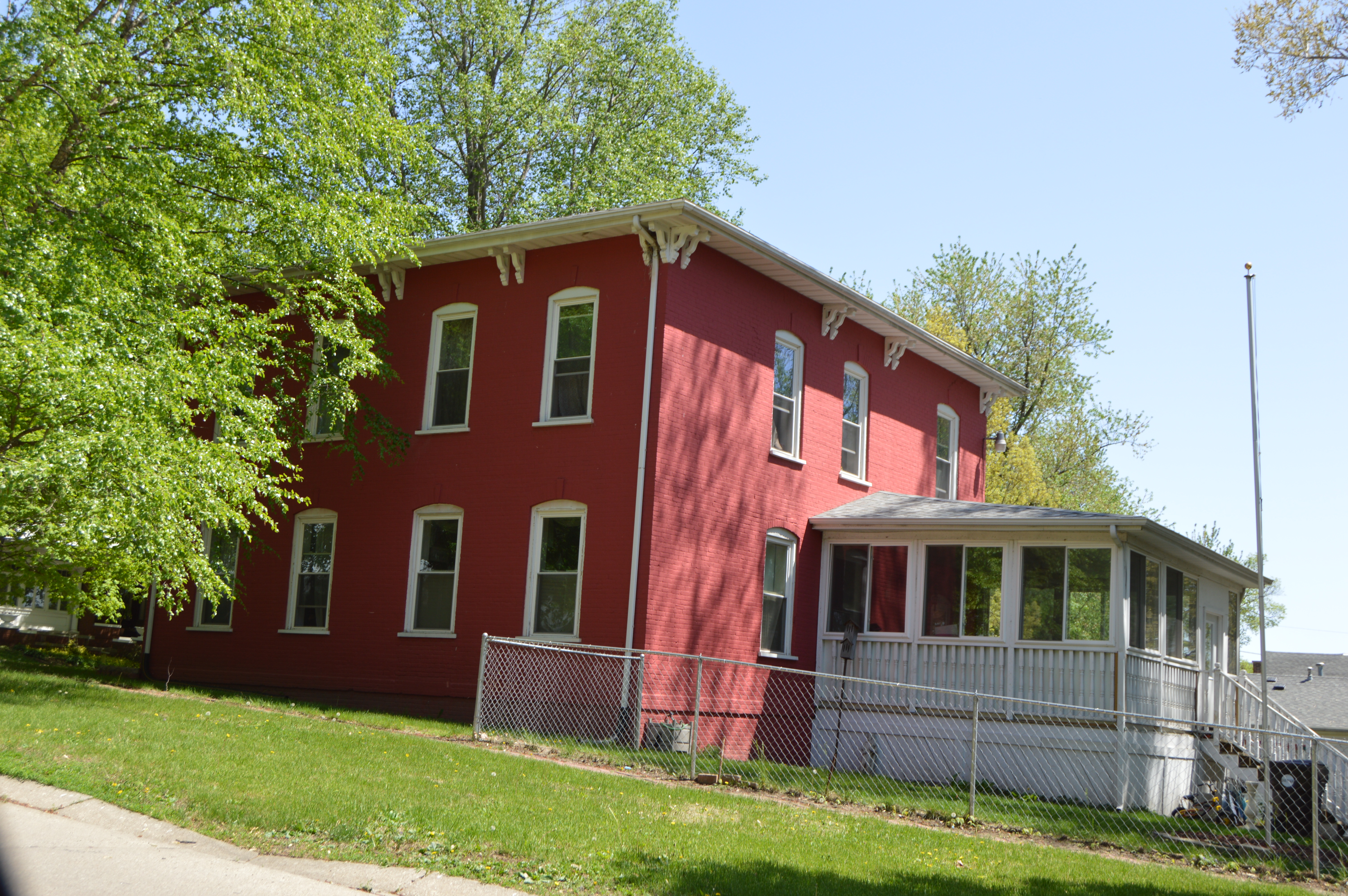
- Side and rear

- Location within Illinois Location within the United States
- Location: 202 S. Marion St., Mt. Pulaski, Illinois
- Coordinates: 40°0′30″N 89°17′12″W
- Area: less than one acre
- Built: c. 1860
- Architectural style: Italianate
- NRHP reference No.: 96000853
- Added to NRHP: August 1, 1996

The Theodore H. O. Mattfeldt House is a historic house located at 202 S. Marion St. in Mount Pulaski, Illinois. The house was constructed circa 1860 for Theodore H. O. Mattfeldt, a Mount Pulaski politician, businessman, postmaster, and surveyor. The Italianate house features a low-pitched hip roof, arched windows, and paired brackets along its roof line, all characteristic features of the style. The house is considered the most historically intact of Mount Pulaski's several Italianate homes.

The house was added to the National Register of Historic Places on August 1, 1996.
