= Downey Building =

- Downey Building - Palms Grill Cafe
- U.S. National Register of Historic Places
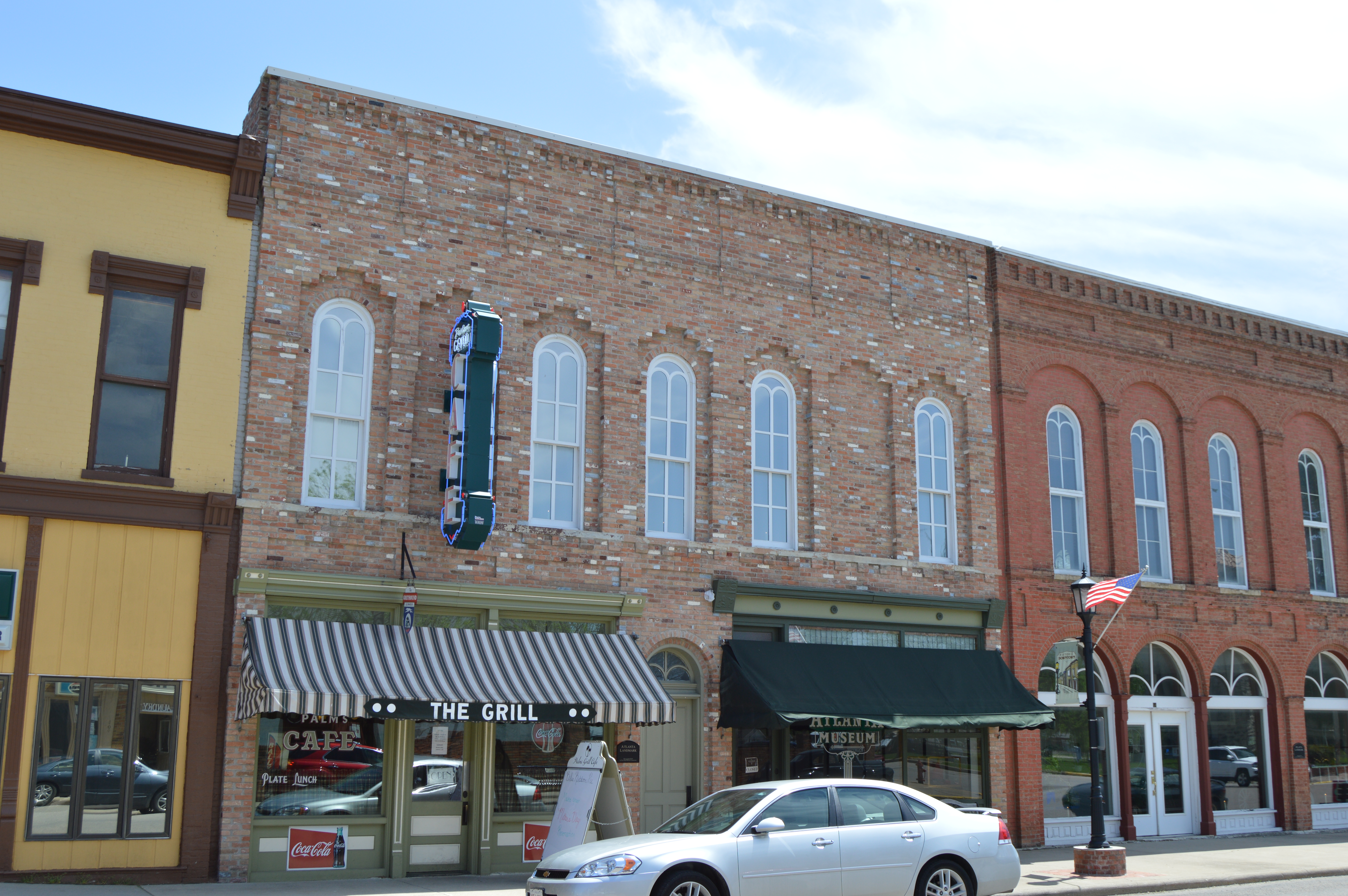
- Front of the building

- Location within Illinois Location within the United States
- Location: 110-112 Southwest Arch St., Atlanta, Illinois
- Coordinates: 40°15′37″N 89°13′53″W
- Area: less than one acre
- Built: 1867
- Architect: Downey, Alexander
- Architectural style: Italianate
- NRHP reference No.: 04000069
- Added to NRHP: February 25, 2004

The Downey Building is a historic building located at 110-112 Southwest Arch Street in Atlanta, Illinois. The Italianate building was constructed in 1867 by local businessman Alexander Downey. The building contains two storefronts, which have historically housed separate businesses.

The Exchange National Bank of Atlanta moved into the south side of the building shortly after it opened; at the time, it was the only bank in Atlanta, as it had been chartered the previous year after the previous bank shut down. The bank later changed its name to the First National Bank of Atlanta and the Atlanta National Bank. In 1916, the bank relocated, and John Luther Bevan acquired the space for his and his son's law office. His son, Samuel Bevan, used the office until his death in 1960. The south side of the building now houses an annex of the Atlanta Museum.

The north side of the building housed various businesses until 1934, when James Robert Adams opened the Palms Grill Café in that storefront. The grill was both a community gathering place and a stop for travelers on U.S. Route 66. In addition to serving food, the café also hosted community gatherings such as dances and bingo. It also served as Atlanta's Greyhound Bus stop. The restaurant featured a large neon sign in front, which was also used to signal buses.

The restaurant was closed during the 1960s but reopened in 2009 after the building was extensively renovated. It is now a popular stop on Historic Route 66 in Illinois. The building was added to the National Register of Historic Places on February 25, 2004.
