= University Hall (Lincoln, Illinois) =

- U.S. National Register of Historic Places
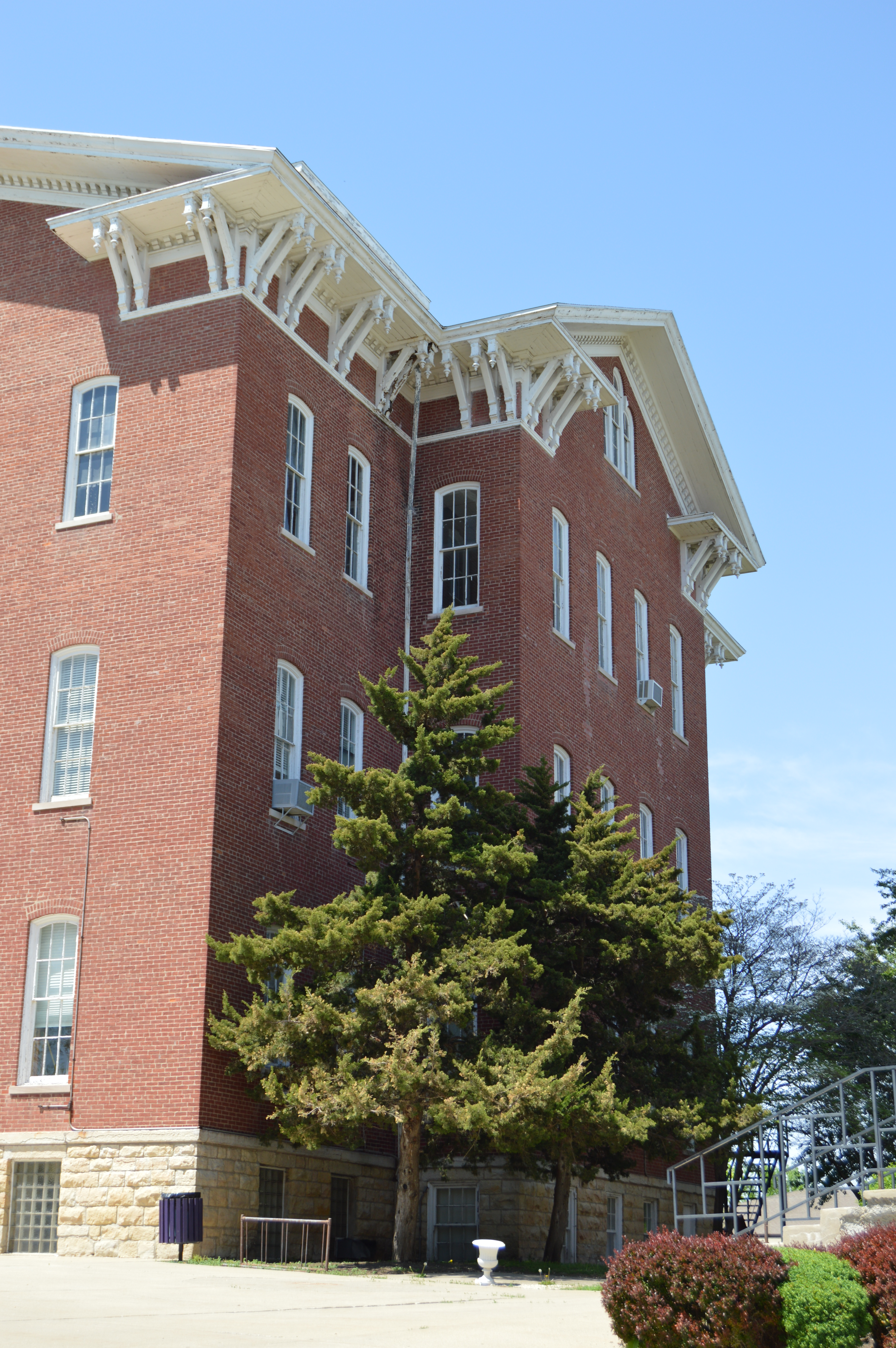
- Eastern front

- Location within Illinois Location within the United States
- Location: 300 Keokuk St., Lincoln, Illinois
- Coordinates: 40.15681°N 89.36148°W
- Area: 1 acre (0.40 ha)
- Built: 1865–66
- Architectural style: Italianate, Tuscan
- NRHP reference No.: 73000711
- Added to NRHP: April 24, 1973

University Hall is a building on the campus of Lincoln College in Lincoln. Built from 1865 to 1866, the building was the first constructed on the campus of the college, then known as Lincoln University. The college was founded by the Cumberland Presbyterian Church and was at the time one of the few religiously affiliated schools in the North. University Hall was designed in a Tuscan-influenced Italianate style and features a four-sided cupola and a cornice with dentils and corbels. Until the college's closure in May 2022, the building housed the school's administrative offices. Since the closure, the building houses the liquidation office.

University Hall was added to the National Register of Historic Places on April 24, 1973.
