= Matt Hughes (fighter) =

American wrestler and mixed martial arts fighter

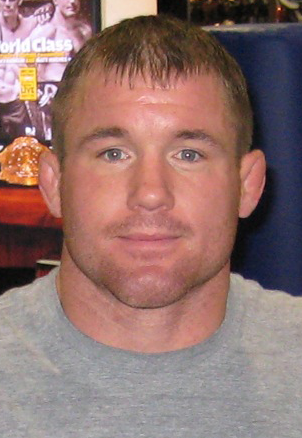
- Hughes in 2007
- Born: Matthew Allen Hughes; October 13, 1973 (age 53); Hillsboro, Illinois, U.S.
- Height: 5 ft 9 in (1.75 m)
- Weight: 170 lb (77 kg; 12 st 2 lb)
- Division: Welterweight
- Reach: 73 in (185 cm)
- Style: Wrestling
- Fighting out of: Chicago, Illinois, U.S.
- Team: Miletich Fighting Systems (1998–2007); Finney's HIT Squad (2007–present)
- Wrestling: NCAA Division I Wrestling
- Years active: 1998–2011

Mixed martial arts record
- Total: 54
- Wins: 45
- By knockout: 21
- By submission: 14
- By decision: 10
- Losses: 9
- By knockout: 5
- By submission: 4

Other information
- University: Eastern Illinois University; Lincoln College; Southwestern Illinois College
- Notable relatives: Mark Hughes (twin brother)
- Mixed martial arts record from Sherdog

Matthew Allen Hughes (born October 13, 1973) is an American retired mixed martial artist with a background in wrestling. Widely considered among the greatest fighters in the history of MMA, he is a former two-time UFC Welterweight Champion, UFC Hall of Fame inductee, and NJCAA Hall of Fame inductee. During his ventures in the Ultimate Fighting Championship, Hughes put together two six-fight winning streaks defeating all of the available opposition in the welterweight division. In May 2010, Hughes became the eighth inductee into the UFC Hall of Fame.

During his reign, Hughes was considered the #1 pound-for-pound mixed martial artist in the world. He was also regarded by many analysts and several media outlets as one of the greatest welterweight fighters of all time, as well as one of the greatest pound-for-pound fighters in the sport's history. Fight Matrix ranks Hughes as the second-greatest welterweight and the #7 pound-for-pound greatest fighter of all time.

A long-time member of Miletich Fighting Systems, Hughes left the Miletich camp in late 2007 to start Team Hughes. In 2008, Hughes published his autobiography, Made in America, which made the New York Times bestseller list. In 2011, Hughes became host of Outdoor Channel's Trophy Hunters TV. Hughes has no nickname, although because of his successes against Gracie Brazilian jiu-jitsu (BJJ) practitioners such as Royce Gracie, Renzo Gracie, Ricardo Almeida, and Matt Serra, people often refer to him as "the Gracie Killer" (the same as Sakuraba's nickname). His mastery of submissions, and having submission wins over various black belt holders, are the reasons why Joe Rogan thinks he deserved to get a black belt for BJJ. Hughes never liked the idea, however, and considers himself primarily an amateur and submission wrestler.

== Early life ==
Matthew Allen Hughes was born on October 13, 1973, in Hillsboro, Illinois. Hughes has two siblings, a sister and his twin brother, Mark. During high school they both participated in football and wrestling. Hughes went to Southwestern Illinois College in Belleville, Illinois, before transferring to Lincoln College, in Lincoln, Illinois and then on to Eastern Illinois University in Charleston, Illinois.

=== Wrestling ===
Hughes was a two-time 145 lb IHSA Class A state wrestling champion. He won in 1991 and 1992 while attending Hillsboro High School. During his junior and senior years, Matt went undefeated and won back-to-back state championships in the 145 lb class. Over the final three years of high school, he totaled 131 wins against only 2 losses, both during his sophomore year (sophomore 43–2; junior 43–0; senior 45–0).

His college career started at Southwestern Illinois College. Hughes placed fifth in the nation at 158 lb. After Southwestern dropped their wrestling program, Hughes transferred to Lincoln College, where he placed third in the nation, notching a 33–3 record for the Lynx.

After graduation Hughes continued wrestling at Eastern Illinois University, where he was a two-time NCAA Division I All-American placing eighth in 1996 and fifth in 1997 at 158 lb. He finished with an 80–15 record for Eastern Illinois.

Hughes competed in the prestigious ADCC Submission Wrestling World Championship, in which he held a record of 2–2, beating Ricardo Almeida and Jeremy Horn, and losing to Jeff Monson and Tito Ortiz.

== Early career ==
Hughes made his mixed martial arts debut on January 1, 1998, at Joe Goytia's JKD Challenge. He slammed his opponent to the ground in just fifteen seconds, winning via KO. The slam became his signature move. He won his next fight via submission due to strikes. Hughes fought three times at Extreme Challenge 21, on October 17, 1998, defeating Victor Hunsaker via TKO and future UFC Middleweight Champion Dave Menne via unanimous decision. In the third fight of that night he lost to then-undefeated Dennis Hallman by technical submission (guillotine choke) at 0:17 of the first round. The result was announced as a KO. In the process, Hallman handed Hughes his first professional defeat.

== Ultimate Fighting Championship ==
Hughes made his promotional debut at UFC 22: There Can Be Only One Champion, on September 24, 1999, defeating Bulgarian Valeri Ignatov via unanimous decision after three rounds.

He returned to the promotion at UFC 26: Ultimate Field of Dreams, where he defeated Marcelo Aguiar via TKO, throwing some elbows which cut Aguiar and forced the doctor to end the match. The stoppage came at 4:34 of the first round.

Hughes faced Dennis Hallman in a rematch at UFC 29: Defense of the Belts. At this point in their careers, Hallman was the only man to have defeated Hughes in MMA competition. Hughes lost the fight via armbar in only twenty seconds. When the bout started, Hughes lifted and brutally slammed Hallman to the mat, but was caught in the submission after landing in side-control.

=== Welterweight championship ===
Hughes won his first UFC World Welterweight title at UFC 34: High Voltage on November 2, 2001. In a come-from-behind fight, Hughes was caught in a triangle choke by then-champion Carlos Newton, but he lifted Newton in the air and slammed him to the mat, causing Newton to hit his head and lose consciousness just as Hughes was himself on the verge of blacking out from the choke. After the match Newton stated that he felt the reason Hughes fell to the mat was because he was rendered unconscious from the triangle choke. This was confirmed by Hughes himself upon reviewing the tape of the match Hughes can be heard telling his corner after the fight "I was out". The result was officially announced as a KO at 1:27 of the second round. The slam is considered to be one of the greatest in MMA history.

He successfully defended his championship belt at UFC 36: Worlds Collide, defeating former Shooto Middleweight Champion Hayato Sakurai via TKO due to strikes at 3:01 of the fourth round. In the first round of the fight, Hughes spent all the time either clinching Sakurai up against the fence, or ripping his feet out from under him. In round 2, Sakurai landed a right hand that sent Hughes to the mat; despite this, Matt won the round by spending three minutes hitting Sakurai with elbows from the top position. At the start of the third round, Hughes quickly slammed Sakurai to the ground, again staying three minutes on top. He looked too strong for Sakurai. Hughes finished the bout in the 4th round, by taking down Sakurai and transitioning to full mount. After one minute of ground-and-pound onslaught, the contest was over as Sakurai had no answer for the champion.

Hughes faced Carlos Newton in their rematch at the main event of UFC 38: Brawl at the Hall, in the promotion's debut in the United Kingdom. He won the fight by technical knockout when he trapped Newton in a modified crucifix position, which allowed him to rain unanswered blows on Newton's face until the referee stopped the contest at 3:27 of round 4.

In his next title defense, Hughes fought Gil Castillo at UFC 40: Vendetta, defeating the former Middleweight contender via TKO. Hughes started the match with a big slam and then began to attack from Castillo's guard with elbows and punches. Hughes easily avoided any submission attempts and looked far stronger than Castillo. As he passed to half guard, Castillo was bleeding above his left eye. The challenger's only offense was a weak triangle choke that went nowhere. The round ended with Hughes on top, ground-and-pounding his opponent. Between rounds doctors ruled that the resulting cut was too severe to continue, and Hughes was declared the winner due to stoppage.

At UFC 42: Sudden Impact, Hughes faced future UFC Lightweight Champion Sean Sherk, winning via unanimous decision. Hughes started the action by taking Sherk down immediately, passing to half guard. Sherk was able to stand for a few seconds before Hughes took him down again. In round two, they started to trade punches, but eventually Hughes took Sherk down. Like the first round, they stood up for a moment. At the beginning of the third round, Sherk took Hughes down, while Hughes attempted a kimura from the bottom. A late stand up led to a second takedown by Sherk. Round 4 saw Hughes using his strength to control the challenger on the ground. Sherk took Hughes down again in the fifth round, but the champion controlled the rest of the time sprawl-and-brawling as he finished on top. With the victory, he became the first man to defeat Sherk.

Hughes faced former WFA Welterweight Champion Frank Trigg at the main event of UFC 45: Revolution. This event marked the UFC's 10th anniversary. After a tactical grappling match-up early on, Trigg fell victim to a standing rear naked choke at 3:45 of the first round. The choke earned Hughes the Tapout of the Night Submission Award.

=== Loss to Penn and regaining the title ===
Hughes kept the title until UFC 46: Supernatural, when he was submitted by Hawaiian Brazilian jiu-jitsu specialist B.J. Penn via rear naked choke at 4:39 of the first round, in a fight he was heavily favored to win. The title was vacated following a contract dispute between Penn and the UFC, which promptly stripped him of the welterweight title, claiming Penn had breached his contract and that the signing constituted him refusing to defend his title. Penn filed suit against UFC and publicized his side of the conflict, claiming his contract had expired. Penn filed a motion to stop UFC from awarding a new welterweight title, but that motion was denied.

Hughes faced Penn's training partner Renato Verissimo at UFC 48: Payback, winning via unanimous decision (30-27; 30–27; 29–28). He was caught in a very tight triangle choke in the first round, but after winning the second and third rounds, was awarded with the victory.

Hughes regained the vacant welterweight title by submitting Canadian contender Georges St-Pierre via armbar in the final second of the first round at UFC 50: The War of '04. The fight was competitive. Hughes took GSP down twice and landed a huge slam. Hughes was in trouble at the beginning of the bout as St-Pierre unloaded a spinning back kick into his ribs. The submission earned Hughes his second Tapout of the Night. Obviously disappointed at the time, St. Pierre admitted afterward that he had lost before he ever stepped into the Octagon. He had regarded Hughes as his idol, not as someone he could beat.

Hughes retained his title against Trigg in their historic rematch at UFC 52: Couture vs. Liddell 2. Accidentally hit in the groin early in the first round, Hughes looked to the referee for assistance; however, the referee had not seen the strike and Trigg capitalized on Hughes's distraction by staggering him with a barrage of punches. The fight quickly went to the ground, with Trigg ground-and-pounding Hughes, then attempting a rear naked choke. After nearly two minutes of struggling, Hughes broke free, picked Trigg up, carried him across the Octagon and slammed him to the ground. Hughes then ground-and-pounded Trigg before securing the victory with a rear naked choke of his own, in what is considered one of the UFC's greatest fights. and comebacks in MMA history This fight is UFC President Dana White's favorite match in combat sport history. He was awarded the Tapout of the Night for the third time in his career.

Hughes's next fight took place at UFC 56: Full Force, where he was scheduled to fight Judo practitioner Karo Parisyan. After Parisyan suffered a hamstring injury and could not fight, Joe Riggs took his place. The match was originally scheduled as a title bout, but since Riggs could not meet the 170-pound weight limit, it became a non-title fight. It marked the first time for the UFC that a title fight had to be called off for this reason.

I'm not disappointed. It makes me a lot more relaxed to go in there. I don't have pressure of possibly losing my title. I think it's great news for me. I mean the only thing I don't like about it is it's a three-round fight and I've trained for five rounds.

Hughes defeated Riggs in the first round by submission via kimura from the half-guard at 3:28. The armlock earned Hughes his last Tapout of the Night award.

We knew what he was planning to do. We worked out his game plan before the fight, and he did exactly what we expected. I over-trained for the fight. That was all. I started training too much, too hard, for too long. He did exactly what we expected.

— Royce Gracie

At UFC 60: Hughes vs. Gracie, on May 27, 2006, Hughes defeated Brazilian Jiu-Jitsu legend and UFC Hall of Famer Royce Gracie in a non-title, catch-weight bout by TKO (strikes) at 4:39 of the first round. Before the stoppage, Gracie was caught in an armlock from the side mount position; although Hughes appeared to have the submission in place, Gracie would not tap out. Hughes stated that he felt his arm pop and realized he would never tap, so instead of breaking his arm, opted to seek a different position . The event drew 620,000 buys, becoming the best-selling pay-per-view in UFC history, and was the first to break the $20 million mark in gross PPV sales.

It just seemed like I was a step ahead of him. I was really surprised. I was [also] surprised by the strength difference, and especially when I was on the ground with him. Wherever I wanted his hand, I put it there. I really shouldn't be able to do that with somebody as talented as Royce.

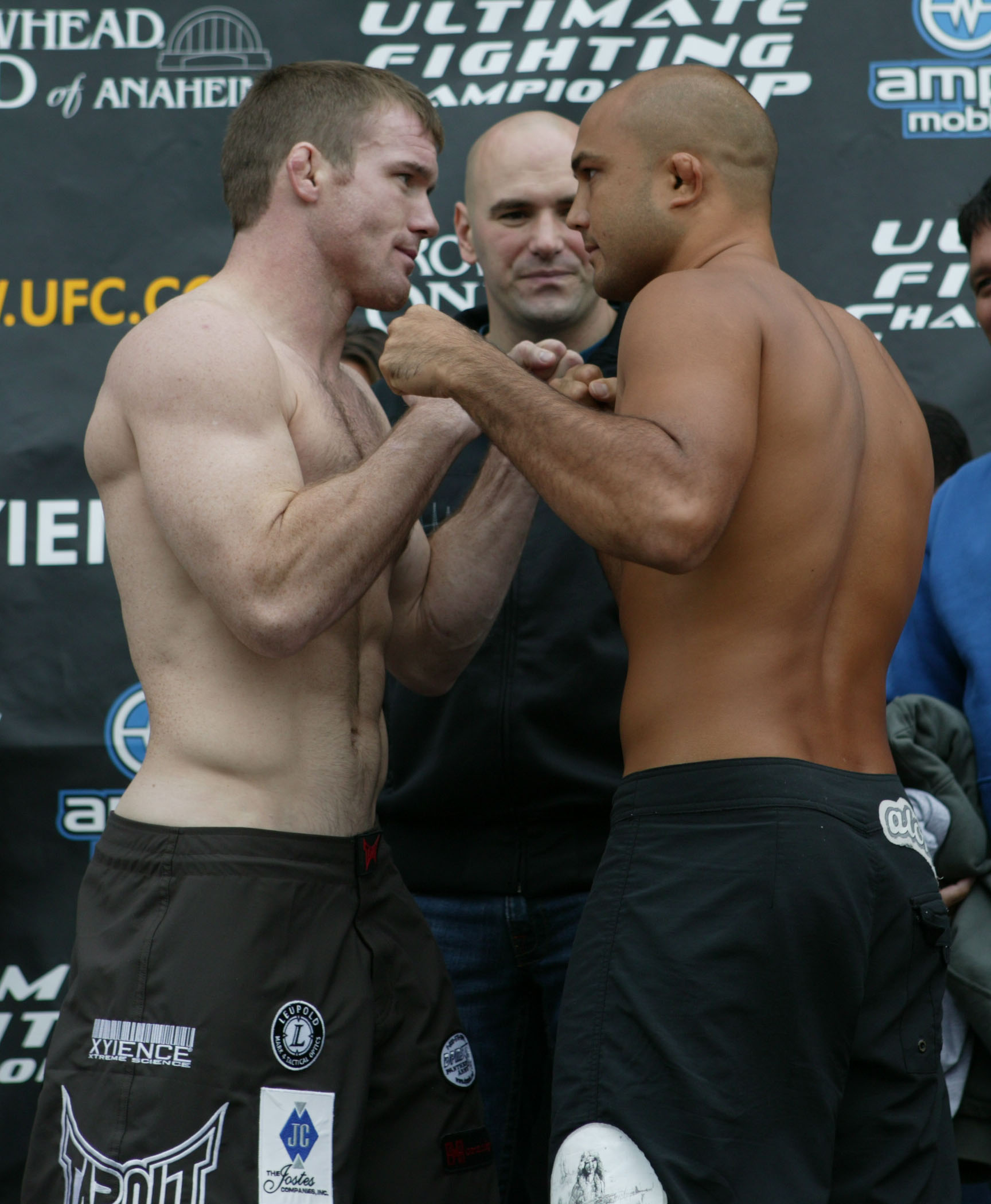
Hughes and Penn at the weigh-ins before their rematch at UFC 63: Hughes vs. Penn

Hughes was scheduled to fight Georges St-Pierre in a rematch at UFC 63, but after St-Pierre sustained a severe groin injury, the UFC announced that B.J. Penn would replace him in the title fight. At this point in their careers, Penn was the only mixed martial artist to beat Hughes after March 2001. In fact, it was Hughes's only loss in his last 19 fights. In the bout, Penn controlled the first two rounds, but sustained a rib injury during the scramble to take Hughes's back in round two. He was visibly different in the third round, appearing exhausted and missing punches he was landing earlier. Hughes was able to take Penn to the mat, and in side-control crucifix position rained punches on Penn's head until referee "Big" John McCarthy stopped the fight at 3:53 of the third round. In the process, Hughes became the first man to stop Penn in a fight. Both fighters were awarded the Fight of the Night bonus. In an interview on Penn's personal website, Penn stated that by round three he could hardly breathe and had no "mobility in his core". Despite the injury, Penn congratulated Hughes, calling him a great fighter and saying he deserved the victory.

You are the greatest champion of all time.

— Dana White told Hughes in the cage at UFC 63.

St-Pierre stepped into the ring to promote his upcoming title fight against Hughes, stating that he was glad that Hughes won his fight, but that he was "not impressed" by Hughes's performance. According to both commentator Joe Rogan and Hughes's own autobiography, Hughes was unhappy with St-Pierre's statement. Hughes said that they "had words" off-camera shortly thereafter. St-Pierre apologized, saying he had misunderstood something Hughes had said on the microphone and did not mean to offend him.

=== Loss to St-Pierre ===
On November 18, 2006, at UFC 65: Bad Intentions, Georges St-Pierre defeated Hughes by TKO via strikes at 1:25 of round two, ending Hughes's title reign. In the first round, Hughes sustained two unintentional kicks near the groin; after Hughes went down from the second kick, St-Pierre was given a warning by referee "Big" John McCarthy. However, Hughes stated in the post-fight interview that the second kick mainly affected his legs, rather than his groin. Nearing the end of the first round, St-Pierre landed a Superman punch, which floored Hughes. St-Pierre then followed up with strikes on his stunned opponent. When it appeared that the fight would be stopped, the bell rang signaling the end of the first round. In the second round, St-Pierre ended the fight with a head kick which stunned Hughes and knocked him to the mat. He followed up with a flurry of punches and elbows that forced McCarthy to stop the contest with 3:35 left in the round.

=== Return ===
On March 3, 2007, Hughes returned to the Octagon for UFC 68: Uprising, defeating Chris Lytle by unanimous decision, winning 30–27 on all three judges' scorecards. Hughes secured an armbar at the end of round one, but Lytle was saved by the bell. Hughes opened the second round with a quick takedown, moving up to side-control and then landed an elbow that cut Lytle. Finally, Hughes mounted his opponent, but Lytle swept and was able to reverse that position. In the third round, Hughes unsuccessfully tried an armbar again before the horn sounded.

In late mid-2007, Hughes left the Miletich camp with Miletich stablemate Robbie Lawler, longtime boxing coach Matt Pena, and wrestling/conditioning teacher Marc Fiore to form The H.I.T. (Hughes Intensive Training) Squad in Granite City, Illinois.

=== The Ultimate Fighter ===
In 2005, Hughes participated as a coach opposite Rich Franklin in the second season of the Spike TV reality television series, The Ultimate Fighter. This was the first season where the coaches did not fight each other after the conclusion of the show, because Franklin and Hughes were champions in different weight divisions. In 2007, Hughes participated as a guest coach for long-time friend and training partner, Jens Pulver during The Ultimate Fighter 5 season.

Hughes agreed to head coach again for The Ultimate Fighter 6, alongside then-UFC Welterweight Champion, Matt Serra. Despite the fact that after the preliminary round, Team Hughes's record was 2–6, both Mac Danzig and Tommy Speer of Team Hughes made it to the finals. In 2011, Hughes appeared as guest coach during The Ultimate Fighter 13 season for friend and former UFC Heavyweight Champion Brock Lesnar.

=== Interim Welterweight Championship bout ===
Hughes is an amazing fighter. I just had a good night that night, and he had a bad night. If we fight again, I don't think he's going to beat me, but he will probably come closer. Maybe he had a bad day -- it's a matter of circumstances as well.

— Georges St-Pierre.

Following a championship win by Matt Serra over Georges St-Pierre at UFC 69, UFC President Dana White announced that Hughes would fight for the World Welterweight title in November 2007 against Serra. This fight was later changed to December 29, 2007, in Las Vegas, at UFC 79: Nemesis. On November 23, however, Serra sustained a herniated disc in his lower back and informed UFC that he would not be able to compete for an indeterminate time. As a replacement for the title match, the UFC quickly signed a rubber match between Hughes and St-Pierre that would also be for the Interim UFC Welterweight Championship. Despite his best efforts, Hughes was unable to mount a serious offense on St-Pierre, who easily avoided Hughes's takedown attempts, while taking Hughes down at will and using Hughes's own ground-and-pound style against him. Near the end of the second round, St-Pierre attempted a kimura on Hughes's right arm that he escaped, but in a reversal of their first fight, St-Pierre was able to twist it into a straight armbar with fifteen seconds remaining in the round. Hughes fought the extension, but with his left hand trapped between the mat and St-Pierre's legs, was forced to submit verbally at 4:54 of the second round. In the post-fight interview, Hughes praised St-Pierre as the better fighter:

No excuses here. I came into this fight 120 percent... Georges is the better fighter. There's nothing more I can say about it.

=== Hughes vs. Alves ===
This means everything to me. I remember watching Matt Hughes slamming people through the floor. I'm really, really happy.

— Thiago Alves, on defeating Hughes.

Hughes fought Thiago Alves at UFC 85: Bedlam on June 7, 2008. Hughes lost to Alves by TKO at 1:02 of the second round. After receiving a powerful flying knee, he dropped to the ground with his own left knee pinned behind his hips, ultimately leaving him with a torn MCL and partially torn PCL. Hughes took the fight on short notice as a favor to UFC. Alves failed to make weight for the match, but Hughes elected to fight him at a catch weight anyway. He stated in his blog:

Thiago came in big, some people told me that he looked bigger than me in the octagon. I didn't expect that but I also think that had nothing to do with the outcome of the fight. I think Thiago came up with a good game plan.

=== Hughes vs. Serra and future ===
In the future there are guys like GSP and Matt Hughes, who I'm sure are going to be hall-of-famers — Serra said before the event. - If I get Matt Hughes under my belt and take care of him, even if I would not be considered one of the best ever, I'd have some victories over some guys who will be. I can live with that.

— Matt Serra.

Immediately after the Alves fight, Hughes stated that he had "one more fight" left in him, and that he wanted to fight Matt Serra. Their rivalry stemmed from the time when Serra was a contestant on The Ultimate Fighter and Hughes was guest coach. Serra did not like the way Hughes criticized other contestants on the show and was disgusted when Hughes constantly picked on Georges St-Pierre during a lunch break and bragged about his submission victory. On January 9, 2009, Hughes confirmed on his blog that UFC 98 would likely be the day he and Serra met in the Octagon. UFC confirmed the fight.

Hughes won the grudge match against Serra at UFC 98 via unanimous decision. In the first round, both fighters collided heads, and Hughes got the worst of it. Despite this, Serra could not finish the fight and Hughes recovered rapidly. In the second round, Hughes controlled his opponent on the ground with his wrestling skills. The final round saw the former champions taking each other down and exchanging punches. The back and forth action rewarded both competitors with Fight of the Night honors. After the fight Hughes and Serra embraced each other and ended their feud. Hughes posted on his blog: "When the fight was over, I was pretty confident I was going to get my hand raised. Some people have asked why I raised his hand at the end. Actually I didn't, he raised mine. He also told me that, no matter what the decision was, he was done with the rivalry". After the fight Hughes said, "I think I have a few more fights left in me."

=== Hughes vs. Gracie ===
Hughes then signed a multi-fight deal with the UFC. Hughes defeated Renzo Gracie, the 1st cousin once removed of his opponent at UFC 60, via third round TKO at UFC 112: Invincible, setting the record for most UFC wins with 17. Both of them seemed very comfortable fighting on their feet in the early going, with Gracie landing the cleaner and more effective punches and also landing a couple of kicks. Hughes started the second round with powerful leg kicks, but after that Gracie returned to his in-and-out punching style. Hughes got double underhooks and managed to take Gracie down briefly. In the final round Hughes connected with a right hook to Gracie's chin, then connected with a leg kick and another punch. With two minutes to go he knocked Gracie down with a leg kick. Gracie took all the time he could before Hughes helped him up and then dropped him with a second leg kick. Gracie stalled again, but when he finally stood up Hughes floored him with a punch, let him get up and then attacked again. Hughes knocked Gracie down again with a fourth punch, when referee Herb Dean ended it.

=== Hall of Fame and Hughes vs. Almeida ===
On May 28, 2010, Hughes was inducted into the UFC Hall of Fame.

I never thought about this, to be honest - I'm just a Midwest guy kinda living the dream. But I'm very privileged and I thank the UFC. Shaking hands, signing autographs, being a world title holder and being inducted into the Hall of Fame, this is beyond what I ever would have pictured my life being.

Fighting Renzo Gracie student and 3rd degree Brazilian Jiu-Jitsu black belt Ricardo Almeida, Hughes rendered him unconscious with a Dave Schultz front headlock at 3:15 of round 1, on August 7, 2010, at UFC 117: Silva vs. Sonnen. Hughes landed a huge left hook that knocked Almeida down, sinking in the very deep choke which earned him the Submission of the Night honors. Almeida requested the fight after watching his mentor lose to Hughes at UFC 112 back in April. Hughes now had four wins over mixed martial artists with ties to the Gracies, including UFC pioneer Royce Gracie, the prior mentioned Renzo Gracie and former champ Serra.

It's an old-school wrestling move. I've been good at it. I'm happy to beat a good Brazilian with a wrestling move.

=== Hughes vs. Penn III ===
You're my idol -- Matt Hughes, you're my idol, you will always be my idol, thank you.

— B.J. Penn at the post-fight interview.

Hughes faced B.J. Penn on November 20, 2010, in a rubber match at UFC 123: Rampage vs. Machida, after their previous two fights at UFC 46 and UFC 63. Penn came out strong in the first few seconds of the opening round, catching one of Hughes's kicks and knocking him off balance with a counter hook. Penn then connected with an overhand right that dropped Hughes, following up with three clean shots to the jaw. The bout was ended at 21 seconds into the first round, with Hughes trilogy against Penn ending at 1–2. The fight marked the first time Hughes had been knocked out (he had previously lost via technical knockout). Post-fight Hughes hinted that the loss moved him one step closer to retirement.

I had a lot on the line. This was a huge fight for me. To be honest, I don't know what goes on now.

=== Hughes vs. Koscheck ===
Hughes was expected to face Diego Sanchez on September 24, 2011, at UFC 135: Jones vs. Rampage. However, Sanchez missed the bout with an injury and was replaced by Josh Koscheck. Hughes suffered a KO loss to Koscheck at 4:59 of the first round. Hughes showed improved striking, but ultimately succumbed to Koscheck's power punches.

I'm not retiring. I'm just going to tell the UFC to put me up on a shelf for a while, and we'll see what happens after that.

=== Retirement ===
The UFC announced on January 24, 2013, that Matt Hughes retired from fighting and was named a Vice President of Athlete Development and Government Relations.

=== Theme music ===
In the UFC, Hughes frequently used the song "A Country Boy Can Survive" by Hank Williams, Jr. as he made his entrance towards the Octagon. At the UFC 56 live broadcast, Joe Rogan said: "My favorite walk-out song in all the UFC, ′A country boy can survive′."

== Autobiography ==
Hughes released his autobiography, Made in America: The Most Dominant Champion in UFC History, co-written with Michael Malice, on January 1, 2008. The book debuted at No. 21 on the New York Times bestseller list.

== Television series ==
=== Trophy Hunters TV ===
In January 2011, Hughes became the host of hunting program Trophy Hunters TV, which aired on Outdoor Channel. The show is closely related to the Texas Trophy Hunters Association.

=== Uncaged with Matt Hughes ===
On July 4, 2013, Hughes became the host of Uncaged with Matt Hughes, which aired Saturdays on the Sportsman Channel.

=== The Takedown with Matt Hughes ===
On October 7, 2014, Hughes partnered with producer Joe David Garza and became the host of a new series entitled The Takedown with Matt Hughes, which aired on Sundays on the Sportsman Channel. The series was nominated for "Best New Series" in 2015 at the Sportsman's Choice Awards.

== Criticisms ==
Matt Hughes has been criticized by animal advocates, including former UFC fighter and commentator Dan Hardy, for his trophy hunting hobby. In response to outrage over trophy hunting pictures posted on his Twitter account in 2012, Hughes called some of the commenters "PETA idiots" and told them to stop following his page.

== Personal life ==
Hughes is a born again Christian and regularly posts Bible verses on his website. Hughes and his wife have two daughters together. She also has a son from a previous relationship. The couple's second daughter was born on January 2, 2010. Matt and his twin brother were born on their father's birthday.

On June 16, 2017, Hughes was hospitalized with a serious head injury after a train struck the passenger side of his truck at a rail crossing near his home in Montgomery County, Illinois. On June 18, Hughes's family released a statement that he had no broken bones or internal injuries but was unconscious and unresponsive. They were working with the Triumph Over Tragedy Foundation to determine next steps for care. The Foundation, of which Hughes was a board member for five years, provides care for families with brain and spinal cord injuries. On January 14, 2018, Hughes returned ringside as a guest of honor during UFC Fight Night in St. Louis. On September 19, 2017, news surfaced that Hughes sued Norfolk Southern Railway and several of its employees for the 2017 train crash. On September 23, 2017, he returned to the hospital to honor the hospital staff who took care of him while he was there. Hughes’ attorneys have stated he will require ongoing medical care and a caretaker for his injuries, including a traumatic brain injury, fevers, depression, anxiety, seizures and memory loss.

=== Domestic violence allegations ===
In May 2019, Hughes's wife filed a restraining order against him after she accused him of several incidents of domestic violence. His brother Mark Hughes also filed a restraining order against him claiming that Matt choked his son and tried to destroy his tractor. Hughes filed to divorce his wife on May 27, 2019. In September 2019, Hughes' attorneys revealed that the brothers had settled their case.

== Championships and accomplishments ==
=== Mixed martial arts ===
- Ultimate Fighting Championship
  - UFC Hall of Fame (Pioneer Wing, class of 2010) and (Fight Wing, class of 2015) vs. Frank Trigg at UFC 52
  - UFC Welterweight Championship (Two times)
    - Five successful title defenses (First reign)
    - Two successful title defenses (Second reign)
    - Seven successful title defenses (Overall)
      - Most finishes in title fights in UFC Welterweight division history (8)
      - Second most title defenses in the UFC Welterweight division history (7)
      - Second most title fights in the UFC Welterweight division history (12)
      - Sixth most title fight wins in UFC history (9)
      - Tied (Jon Jones) for second most finishes in UFC title fights (8)
      - Tied (Chuck Liddell, Randy Couture & T.J. Dillashaw) for third most knockouts in title fights in UFC history (5)
      - Most knockouts in title fights in UFC Welterweight division history (5)
      - Most submissions in title fights in UFC Welterweight division history (3)
  - Fight of the Night (Two times) vs. B.J. Penn 2 and Matt Serra
  - Submission of the Night (One time) vs. Ricardo Almeida
  - UFC Encyclopedia Awards
    - Fight of the Night (Two times) vs. Sean Sherk and Frank Trigg 1
    - Knockout of the Night (One time) vs. Carlos Newton
    - Submission of the Night (Four times) vs. Frank Trigg (x2), Georges St-Pierre 1 and Joe Riggs
  - Tied (Neil Magny) for third most finishes in UFC Welterweight division history (11)
  - Seventh most bouts in UFC Welterweight division history (22)
  - Tied (Thiago Alves & Kamaru Usman) for fifth most wins in UFC Welterweight division history (15)
  - Holds wins over six former UFC champions — vs. Carlos Newton (x2), Sean Sherk, Royce Gracie, Georges St-Pierre, B.J. Penn and Matt Serra
  - UFC.com Awards
    - 2005: Submission of the Year vs. Frank Trigg 2 & Ranked #2 Fight of the Year vs. Frank Trigg 2
    - 2006: Ranked #7 Fight of the Year vs. B.J. Penn 2
    - 2010: Ranked #3 Submission of the Year vs. Ricardo Almeida
- Extreme Challenge
  - Extreme Challenge 21 Tournament Runner-up
  - Extreme Challenge 29 Tournament Winner
- FanSided
  - 2000s #5 Ranked MMA Fighter of the Decade
- Black Belt Magazine
  - 2006 NHB Fighter of the Year
  - Black Belt Magazine Hall of Famer
- Sherdog
  - Mixed Martial Arts Hall of Fame
- Bleacher Report
  - 2000s Welterweight of the Decade
- George Tragos/Lou Thesz Professional Wrestling Hall of Fame
  - George Tragos Award (2013)
- Sports Illustrated
  - 2000s #3 Fighter of the Decade
  - UFC's #4 Greatest Fight vs. Frank Trigg on April 16, 2005
  - UFC's #1 Greatest Fight vs. B.J. Penn on September 23, 2006
- About.com
  - 2000s #5 Fight of the Decade vs. B.J. Penn on September 23, 2006
  - 2000s #3 Fight of the Decade vs. Frank Trigg on April 16, 2005
- Fight Matrix
  - 1999 Fighter of the Year 3rd Place
  - 2002 Fighter of the Year
  - 2003 Fighter of the Year 3rd Place
  - 2004 Fighter of the Year 3rd Place
  - 2005 Fighter of the Year 3rd Place
  - 2006 Most Noteworthy Match of the Year vs. Georges St-Pierre at UFC 65
- MMA Fighting
  - 2002 Welterweight Fighter of the Year
  - 2003 Welterweight Fighter of the Year
  - 2005 Submission of the Year vs. Frank Trigg on April 16, 2005
- Yahoo! Sports
  - 2000s #6 Fight of the Decade vs. Frank Trigg on April 16, 2005
- World MMA Awards
  - 2021 Lifetime Achievement Award

=== Amateur wrestling ===
- National Collegiate Athletic Association
  - NCAA Division I All-American Team (Two times)
  - NCAA Division I 158 lb - 8th place out of Eastern Illinois University (1996)
  - NCAA Division I 158 lb - 5th place out of Eastern Illinois University (1997)
- National Junior College Athletic Association
  - NJCAA Hall of Fame
  - NJCAA All-American Team (Two times)
  - NJCAA Division I 158 lb - 5th place out of Southwestern Illinois College (1994)
  - NJCAA Division I 158 lb - 3rd place out of Lincoln College (1995)
- Eastern Illinois University
  - EIU Athletic Hall of Fame
- Illinois High School Association
  - IHSA Class A State Wrestling Champion 145 lb (1991)
  - IHSA Class A State Wrestling Champion 145 lb (1992)

== Mixed martial arts record ==
Professional record breakdown
54 matches	45 wins	9 losses
By knockout	21	5
By submission	14	4
By decision	10	0

Res.	Record	Opponent	Method	Event	Date	Round	Time	Location	Notes
Loss	45–9	Josh Koscheck	KO (punches)	UFC 135	September 24, 2011	1	4:59	Denver, Colorado, United States	
Loss	45–8	B.J. Penn	KO (punches)	UFC 123	November 20, 2010	1	0:21	Auburn Hills, Michigan, United States	
Win	45–7	Ricardo Almeida	Technical Submission (anaconda choke)	UFC 117	August 7, 2010	1	3:15	Oakland, California, United States	Submission of the Night.
Win	44–7	Renzo Gracie	TKO (leg kicks and punches)	UFC 112	April 10, 2010	3	4:40	Abu Dhabi, United Arab Emirates	
Win	43–7	Matt Serra	Decision (unanimous)	UFC 98	May 23, 2009	3	5:00	Las Vegas, Nevada, United States	Fight of the Night.
Loss	42–7	Thiago Alves	TKO (flying knee and punches)	UFC 85	June 7, 2008	2	1:02	London, England	Catchweight (174 lbs) bout; Alves missed weight.
Loss	42–6	Georges St-Pierre	Submission (armbar)	UFC 79	December 29, 2007	2	4:54	Las Vegas, Nevada, United States	For the interim UFC Welterweight Championship.
Win	42–5	Chris Lytle	Decision (unanimous)	UFC 68	March 3, 2007	3	5:00	Columbus, Ohio, United States	
Loss	41–5	Georges St-Pierre	TKO (head kick and punches)	UFC 65	November 18, 2006	2	1:25	Sacramento, California, United States	Lost the UFC Welterweight Championship.
Win	41–4	B.J. Penn	TKO (punches)	UFC 63	September 23, 2006	3	3:53	Anaheim, California, United States	Defended the UFC Welterweight Championship. Fight of the Night.
Win	40–4	Royce Gracie	TKO (punches)	UFC 60	May 27, 2006	1	4:39	Los Angeles, California, United States	Catchweight (175 lbs) bout.
Win	39–4	Joe Riggs	Submission (kimura)	UFC 56	November 19, 2005	1	3:26	Las Vegas, Nevada, United States	Non-title bout. Riggs failed to make weight (172.5 lbs).
Win	38–4	Frank Trigg	Submission (rear-naked choke)	UFC 52	April 16, 2005	1	4:05	Las Vegas, Nevada, United States	Defended the UFC Welterweight Championship. Submission of the Year (2005).
Win	37–4	Georges St-Pierre	Submission (armbar)	UFC 50	October 22, 2004	1	4:59	Atlantic City, New Jersey, United States	Won the vacant UFC Welterweight Championship.
Win	36–4	Renato Verissimo	Decision (unanimous)	UFC 48	June 19, 2004	3	5:00	Las Vegas, Nevada, United States	
Loss	35–4	B.J. Penn	Submission (rear-naked choke)	UFC 46	January 31, 2004	1	4:39	Las Vegas, Nevada, United States	Lost the UFC Welterweight Championship.
Win	35–3	Frank Trigg	Submission (rear-naked choke)	UFC 45	November 21, 2003	1	3:54	Uncasville, Connecticut, United States	Defended the UFC Welterweight Championship.
Win	34–3	Sean Sherk	Decision (unanimous)	UFC 42	April 25, 2003	5	5:00	Miami, Florida, United States	Defended the UFC Welterweight Championship.
Win	33–3	Gil Castillo	TKO (doctor stoppage)	UFC 40	November 22, 2002	1	5:00	Las Vegas, Nevada, United States	Defended the UFC Welterweight Championship.
Win	32–3	Carlos Newton	TKO (punches)	UFC 38	July 13, 2002	4	3:27	London, England	Defended the UFC Welterweight Championship.
Win	31–3	Hayato Sakurai	TKO (punches)	UFC 36	March 22, 2002	4	3:01	Las Vegas, Nevada, United States	Defended the UFC Welterweight Championship.
Win	30–3	Carlos Newton	KO (slam)	UFC 34	November 2, 2001	2	1:27	Las Vegas, Nevada, United States	Won the UFC Welterweight Championship.
Win	29–3	Steve Gomm	TKO (punches)	Extreme Challenge 43	September 8, 2001	2	3:18	Orem, Utah, United States	
Win	28–3	Hiromitsu Kanehara	Decision (majority)	Rings: 10th Anniversary	August 11, 2001	3	5:00	Tokyo, Japan	
Win	27–3	Chatt Lavender	Submission (arm-triangle choke)	Extreme Challenge 41	July 13, 2001	3	2:31	Davenport, Iowa, United States	
Win	26–3	Scott Johnson	KO (punch)	Extreme Challenge 40	June 16, 2001	1	3:24	Springfield, Illinois, United States	
Win	25–3	John Cronk	TKO (submission to punches)	Gladiators 14	May 11, 2001	1	N/A	Omaha, Nebraska, United States	
Win	24–3	Bruce Nelson	Submission (guillotine choke)	Freestyle Combat Challenge 4	March 31, 2001	1	3:01	Racine, Wisconsin, United States	
Win	23–3	Brett Al-azzawi	Submission (armbar)	Rings USA: Battle of Champions	March 17, 2001	1	3:27	Council Bluffs, Iowa, United States	
Loss	22–3	José Landi-Jons	KO (knee)	Shidokan Jitsu: Warriors War 1	February 8, 2001	1	4:45	Kuwait City, Kuwait	Middleweight (185 lbs) bout.
Loss	22–2	Dennis Hallman	Submission (armbar)	UFC 29	December 16, 2000	1	0:20	Tokyo, Japan	
Win	22–1	Maynard Marcum	Submission (keylock)	Rings Australia: Free Fight Battle	November 12, 2000	1	6:29	Brisbane, Australia	
Win	21–1	Robbie Newman	Submission (arm-triangle choke)	Rings USA: Rising Stars Final	September 30, 2000	1	1:40	Moline, Illinois, United States	
Win	20–1	Chris Haseman	Decision (unanimous)	Rings: Millennium Combine 3	August 23, 2000	2	5:00	Osaka, Japan	
Win	19–1	Joe Guist	Submission (armbar)	Extreme Challenge 35	June 29, 2000	1	2:45	Davenport, Iowa, United States	
Win	18–1	Marcelo Aguiar	TKO (doctor stoppage)	UFC 26	June 9, 2000	1	4:34	Cedar Rapids, Iowa, United States	
Win	17–1	Shawn Peters	Submission (arm-triangle choke)	Extreme Challenge 32	May 21, 2000	1	2:52	Springfield, Illinois, United States	
Win	16–1	Alexandre Barros	Decision (unanimous)	WEF 9: World Class	May 13, 2000	3	5:00	Evansville, Indiana, United States	
Win	15–1	Eric Davila	Submission (keylock)	SuperBrawl 17	April 15, 2000	2	3:24	Honolulu, Hawaii, United States	
Win	14–1	Jorge Pereira	TKO (doctor stoppage)	WEF 8: Goin' Platinum	January 15, 2000	1	6:00	Rome, Georgia, United States	
Win	13–1	Daniel Vianna	TKO (cut)	Jeet Kune Do Challenge 4	November 20, 1999	1	N/A	Chicago, Illinois, United States	
Win	12–1	LaVerne Clark	Submission (rear-naked choke)	Extreme Challenge 29	November 13, 1999	2	1:35	Hayward, Wisconsin, United States	
Win	11–1	Tom Schmitz	TKO (eye injury)	Extreme Challenge 29	November 13, 1999	1	0:48	Hayward, Wisconsin, United States	
Win	10–1	Joe Doerksen	TKO (submission to knees and punches)	Extreme Challenge 29	November 13, 1999	2	0:25	Hayward, Wisconsin, United States	
Win	9–1	Valeri Ignatov	Decision (unanimous)	UFC 22	September 24, 1999	3	5:00	Lake Charles, Louisiana, United States	
Win	8–1	Akihiro Gono	Decision (unanimous)	Shooto - 10th Anniversary Event	May 29, 1999	3	5:00	Yokohama, Japan	
Win	7–1	Erick Snyder	TKO (slam)	Jeet Kune Do Challenge 3	April 24, 1999	1	N/A	Chicago, Illinois, United States	
Win	6–1	Joe Stern	TKO (punches)	Extreme Challenge 23	April 2, 1999	1	2:30	Indianapolis, Indiana, United States	
Win	5–1	Ryan Stout	TKO (corner stoppage)	Extreme Shootfighting	December 11, 1998	2	5:00	Waukesha, Wisconsin, United States	
Loss	4–1	Dennis Hallman	Technical Submission (guillotine choke)	Extreme Challenge 21	October 17, 1998	1	0:17	Hayward, Wisconsin, United States	
Win	4–0	Dave Menne	Decision (unanimous)	Extreme Challenge 21	October 17, 1998	1	15:00	Hayward, Wisconsin, United States	
Win	3–0	Victor Hunsaker	TKO (punches)	Extreme Challenge 21	October 17, 1998	1	1:39	Hayward, Wisconsin, United States	
Win	2–0	Craig Quick	TKO (submission to punches)	Jeet Kune Do Challenge 2	April 25, 1998	1	N/A	Chicago, Illinois, United States	
Win	1–0	Erick Snyder	KO (slam)	Jeet Kune Do Challenge 1	January 1, 1998	1	0:15	Chicago, Illinois, United States	

== Pay-per-view bouts ==
No	Event	Fight	Date	Venue	City	PPV Buys
1.	UFC 38	Hughes vs. Newton	13 July 2002	Royal Albert Hall	London, United Kingdom	45,000
2.	UFC 42	Hughes vs. Sherk	25 April 2003	American Airlines Arena	Miami, United States	35,000
3.	UFC 45	Hughes vs. Trigg	21 November 2003	Mohegan Sun Arena	Uncasville, United States	40,000
4.	UFC 60	Hughes vs. Gracie	27 May 2006	Staples Arena	Los Angeles, United States	620,000
5.	UFC 63	Hughes vs. Penn 2	23 September 2006	Arrowhead Pond	Anaheim, United States	400,000
6.	UFC 65	Hughes vs. St Pierre 2	18 November 2006	ARCO Arena	Sacramento, United States	500,000
7.	UFC 79	St Pierre vs. Hughes 3	29 December 2007	Mandalay Bay Events Centre	Las Vegas, United States	650,000
8.	UFC 85	Hughes vs. Alves	7 June 2008	The O2 Arena	London, United Kingdom	215,000

== Submission grappling record ==
Professional record breakdown
4 matches	2 wins	2 losses
By submission	1	0
By decision	0	2
By disqualification	1	0

4 Matches, 2 Wins (1 Submission), 2 Loss
Result	Rec.	Opponent	Method	Event	Division	Date	Location
Lose	2-2	(United States) Tito Ortiz	Points	ADCC 2000	–99 kg	2000	(United Arab Emirates) Abu Dhabi
Lose	2-1	(United States) Jeff Monson	Points	ADCC 2000	–99 kg	2000	(United Arab Emirates) Abu Dhabi
Win	2-0	(United States) Jeremy Horn	Submission (Guillotine) Jeremy Horn threw the match to Matt Hughes.	ADCC 2000	–99 kg	2000	(United Arab Emirates) Abu Dhabi
Win	1-0	(Brazil) Ricardo Almeida	Penalty	ADCC 2000	–99 kg	2000	(United Arab Emirates) Abu Dhabi

- Matt Hughes fought Tito Ortiz for the bronze medal (3rd place) and was defeated.

== Filmography ==
Year	Title	Role	Notes
2005	The Big Idea with Donny Deutsch	Himself	TV episode dated October 8, 2005
2005	The Ultimate Fighter 2	Himself	Head coach
2006	The Ultimate Fighter 4	Himself	Guest trainer
2006	Quite Frankly with Stephen A. Smith	Himself	TV episode dated October 9, 2006
2007	The Modern Warrior	Himself	Film
2007	The Ultimate Fighter 5	Himself	Guest coach
2007	The Ultimate Fighter 6	Himself	Head coach
2009	FightZone Presents	Himself	TV episode: "UWC: Man O'War - Part 2"
2011	The Ultimate Fighter 13	Himself	Guest coach
2011 — present	Trophy Hunters TV	Himself	
2016 — 2017	Kingdom (U.S. TV series)	Himself	Fighter

=== Video games ===
Year	Title	Role
2000	Ultimate Fighting Championship	Himself
2002	UFC: Tapout	Himself
2002	UFC: Throwdown	Himself
2003	UFC: Tapout 2	Himself
2004	UFC: Sudden Impact	Himself
2009	UFC 2009 Undisputed	Himself
2010	UFC Undisputed 2010	Himself
2012	UFC Undisputed 3	Himself
2014	EA Sports UFC	Himself
2016	EA Sports UFC 2	Himself
2018	EA Sports UFC 3	Himself
2020	EA Sports UFC 4	Himself
2023	EA Sports UFC 5	Himself

== See also ==
- List of male mixed martial artists
- List of UFC champions

Preceded by Carlos Newton	3rd UFC Welterweight Champion; November 2, 2001 – January 31, 2004	Succeeded by B.J. Penn
Vacant Title last held by B.J. Penn	5th UFC Welterweight Champion; October 22, 2004 – November 18, 2006	Succeeded by Georges St-Pierre
