= Gil Castillo =

American mixed martial arts fighter

- Born: Gil Philip Castillo; October 21, 1965 (age 60); Concord, California, United States
- Height: 5 ft 9 in (1.75 m)
- Weight: 170 lb (77 kg; 12 st)
- Division: Middleweight; Welterweight
- Fighting out of: Pleasant Hill, California
- Team: Cesar Gracie Fight Team
- Rank: All American Wrestling
- Years active: 1998–2006

Mixed martial arts record
- Total: 16
- Wins: 11
- By knockout: 2
- By submission: 5
- By decision: 4
- Losses: 5
- By knockout: 3
- By decision: 2

Other information
- Mixed martial arts record from Sherdog

Gil Philip Castillo (born October 21, 1965) is an American professional mixed martial artist. A professional from 1998 until 2006, he fought in the UFC, WEC and King of the Cage. Castillo is the former King of the Cage Middleweight Superfight Champion.

== Background ==
Gil Castillo was born in Ohio, California. Castillo excelled in wrestling at Antioch High School and after competing for California State University at Long Beach, he entered the trials for the Olympic team. He went 2–2, and needed to win his fourth match to get on the squad that trains for the alternate team, but lost on points. After becoming a licensed stockbroker, Castillo found Brazilian jiu-jitsu in 1995, and was trained by Cesar Gracie and Ralph Gracie before they introduced him to mixed martial arts.

== Mixed martial arts career ==
=== Early career ===
Castillo made his professional debut in early 1997 in a tournament. He won his debut via rear-naked choke submission only 40 seconds into the first round. He won his next fight after his opponent broke his wrist during the fight, and in the tournament final, Castillo faced veteran Vernon White and won via armbar submission in just three minutes. Castillo fought for the King of the Cage Middleweight Superfight Championship on April 29, 2001, against then-champion Joe Hurley. In a back-and-forth fight, Castillo scored seven takedowns on the Lion's Den fighter, and won via unanimous decision. Castillo then fought future Strikeforce Welterweight Champion Nate Marquardt for the IFC Welterweight Championship and won via unanimous decision before being invited to compete in the UFC.

=== UFC ===
At UFC 33 on September 28, 2001, Castillo made his UFC debut, fighting a much-larger Dave Menne for the first-ever UFC Middleweight Championship. Castillo lost via unanimous decision and was handed his first professional loss.

After picking up a unanimous decision win over Chris Brennan at UFC 35, Castillo fought for the UFC Welterweight Championship against then-champion Matt Hughes at UFC 40 on November 22, 2002. Castillo lost via doctor stoppage due to a cut received in the first round.

=== WEC ===
Castillo then began fighting for the WEC, making his debut for the organization on March 27, 2003, at WEC 6 against Chris Williams. Castillo won via TKO.

Castillo fought on May 21, 2004, at WEC 10 against future IFL Lightweight Champion Ryan Schultz and lost via TKO. His last appearance for the organization was on October 14, 2005, at WEC 17 against Steve Ramirez. Castillo won via TKO. Castillo's fought last on April 1, 2006, in an IFC event against current UFC Welterweight Jake Ellenberger. Castillo lost via TKO in the first round.

== Mixed martial arts record ==
Professional record breakdown
16 matches	11 wins	5 losses
By knockout	2	3
By submission	5	0
By decision	4	2

Res.	Record	Opponent	Method	Event	Date	Round	Time	Location	Notes
Loss	11–5	Jake Ellenberger	TKO (punches)	IFC Cage Combat	April 1, 2006	1	1:30	Sacramento, California, United States	
Win	11–4	Steve Ramerez	TKO (punches)	WEC 17	October 14, 2005	2	4:01	Lemoore, California, United States	
Loss	10–4	Ryan Schultz	Decision (majority)	WEC 10	May 21, 2004	3	5:00	Lemoore, California, United States	
Loss	10–3	Renato Verissimo	TKO (corner stoppage)	Rumble on the Rock 4	October 10, 2003	2	5:00	Honolulu, Hawaii, United States	
Win	10–2	Chris Williams	TKO (corner stoppage)	WEC 6: Return of a Legend	March 27, 2003	1	5:00	Lemoore, California, United States	
Loss	9–2	Matt Hughes	TKO (cut)	UFC 40	November 22, 2002	1	5:00	Las Vegas, Nevada, United States	For the UFC Welterweight Championship.
Win	9–1	Chris Brennan	Decision (unanimous)	UFC 35	January 11, 2002	3	5:00	Uncasville, Connecticut, United States	Return to Welterweight.
Loss	8–1	Dave Menne	Decision (unanimous)	UFC 33	September 28, 2001	5	5:00	Las Vegas, Nevada, United States	For the inaugural UFC Middleweight Championship.
Win	8–0	Nate Marquardt	Decision (unanimous)	IFC 14 Warriors Challenge 14	July 18, 2001	5	5:00	California, United States	Won the IFC Welterweight Championship.
Win	7–0	Joe Hurley	Decision (unanimous)	KOTC 8: Bombs Away	April 29, 2001	3	5:00	Williams, California, United States	Won the KOTC Middleweight Superfight Championship.
Win	6–0	Raymond Mansfield	Submission (omoplata)	IFC Warriors Challenge 10	October 11, 2000	1	N/A	Friant, California, United States	Middleweight debut.
Win	5–0	Robert Ferguson	Decision (unanimous)	IFC Warriors Challenge 8	June 14, 2000	2	10:00	Friant, California, United States	
Win	4–0	Dennis Muehy	Submission (armbar)	IFC Warriors Challenge 6	March 25, 2000	1	1:17	Friant, California, United States	
Win	3–0	Aaron Sampson	Submission (armbar)	Stockton Brawl	Sep 28, 1998	1	1:17	Stockton, California, United States	
Win	2–0	Vernon White	Submission (armbar)	Stockton Challenge 2	January 17, 1998	1	3:00	Stockton, California, United States	Won the Stockton Challenge 2 Tournament.
Win	1–0	Allen Fernandez	Submission (rear naked choke)	Stockton Challenge 2	January 17, 1998	1	0:40	Stockton, California, United States	
