= Comparison of professional wrestling and mixed martial arts =

Comparison between professional wrestling and MMA

Professional wrestling and mixed martial arts (also known as MMA) both combine grappling and strikes. In MMA, fights are competitions, in contrast to professional wrestling where the outcomes and moves performed are often scripted or predetermined. Despite this difference, several people have competed in both professional wrestling and MMA.

== Comparison ==
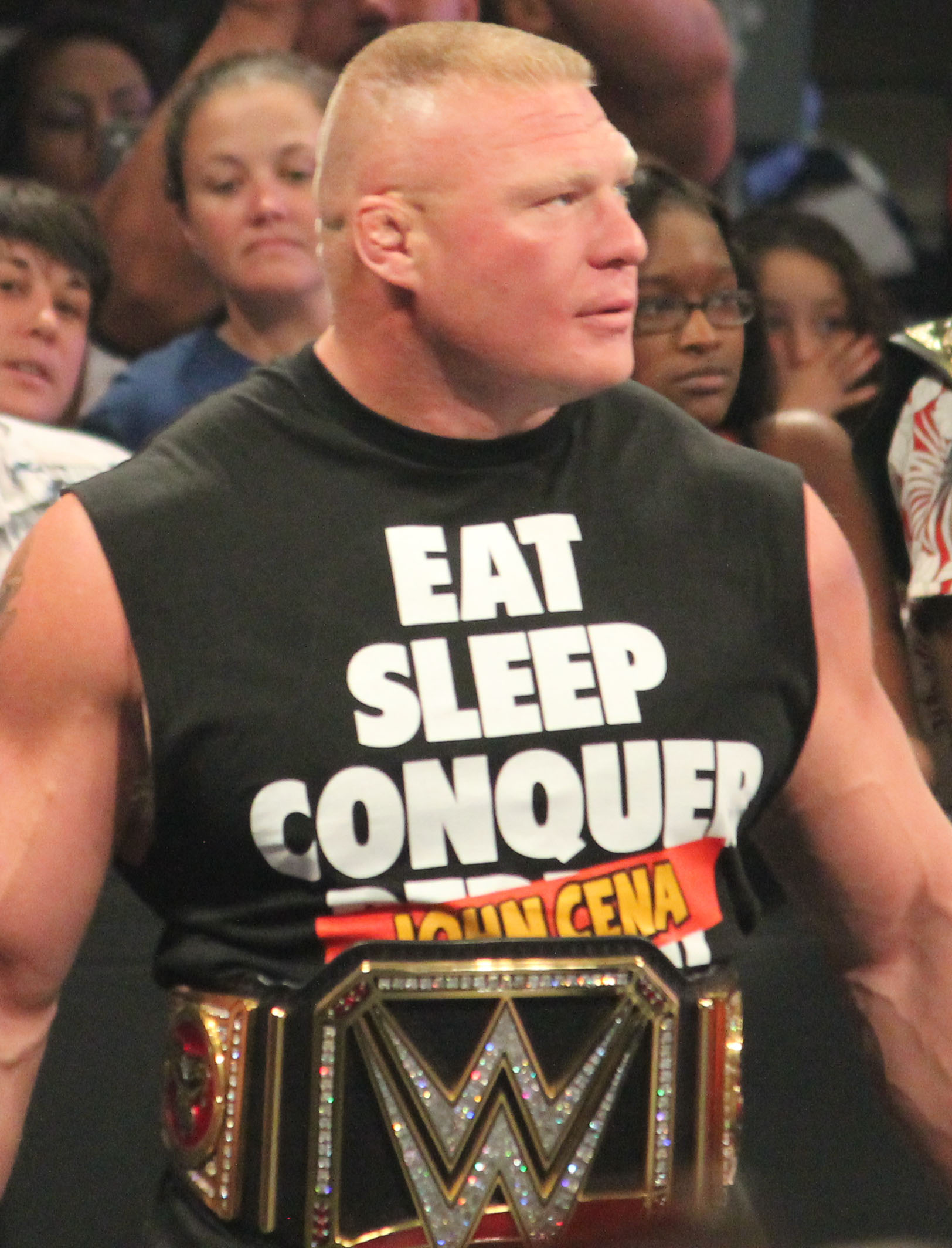
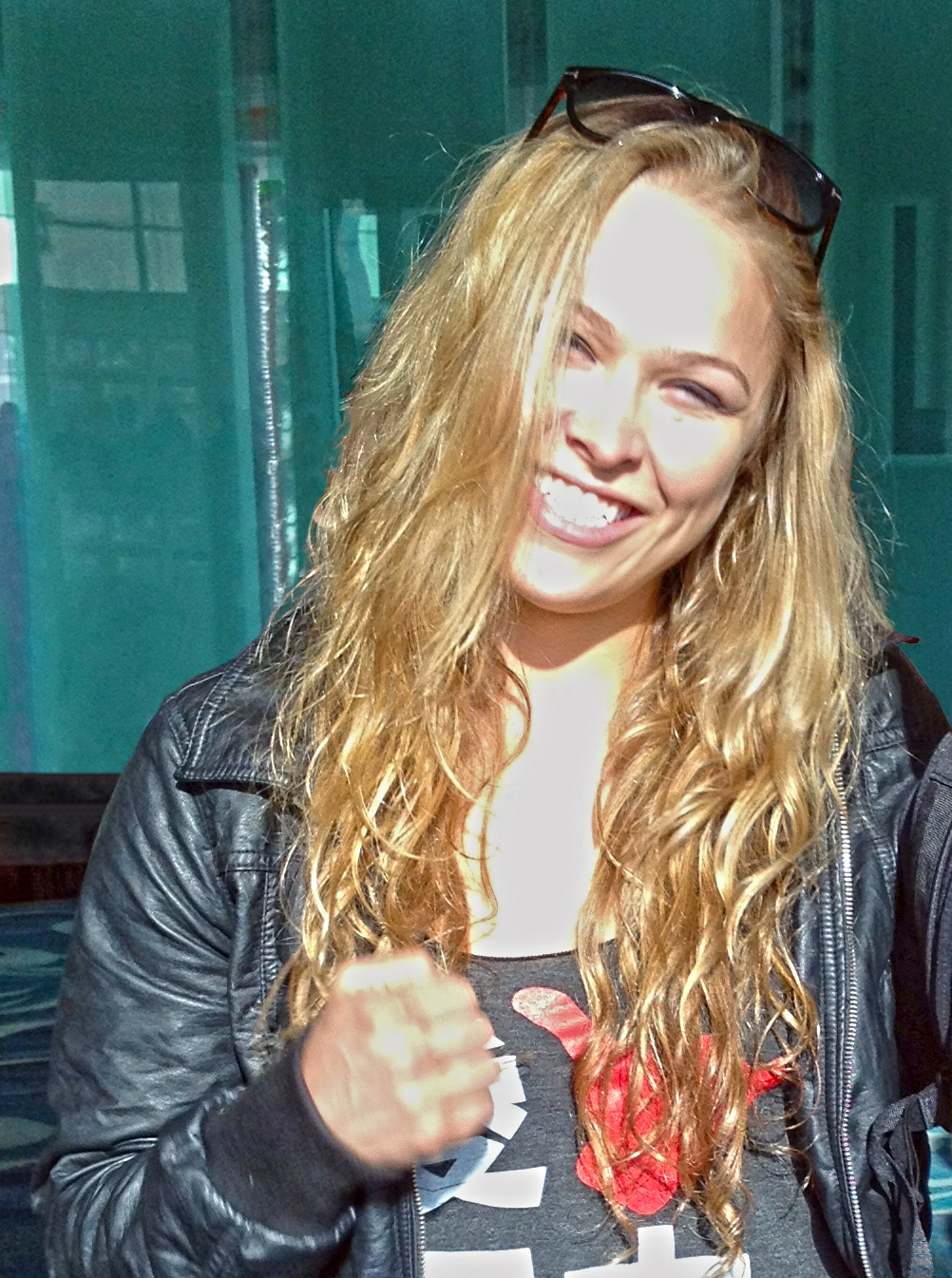
Brock Lesnar and Ronda Rousey are the first man and woman, respectively, to have won world championships in both professional wrestling and mixed martial arts.

Professional wrestling could be considered a performance art which combines athletics with theatrical performance. Matches are contested on a pre-determined basis, where the fight on display is merely for entertainment purposes. Viewers are integral to a professional wrestling match, as the audience is who the action is for. Professional wrestling mixes many styles of amateur wrestling, striking and showmanship to display a fight, whilst the two performers work together to achieve a "worked" fight. Professional wrestling was first popularized in 19th century Europe as a carnival attraction.

Mixed Martial Arts, is a hybrid of many types of physical full-contact sports; including wrestling, boxing and Martial Arts, such as Brazilian Jiu-Jitsu. The early 1990s saw the Ultimate Fighting Championship (UFC) popularize the term "Mixed Martial Arts", for such a bout. Competitors in MMA are generally skilled in many different styles, however, it is possible to be only proficient in one type of combat. As some professional wrestling moves are simply worked versions of legitimate holds, there can be a crossover between the two.

Possibly the most successful crossover pro wrestler and MMA competitor is Brock Lesnar, who has won the world championships in both World Wrestling Entertainment (WWE) and the UFC. Other wrestlers to have won world championships in both MMA and Pro Wrestling include Bobby Lashley (Shark Fights Heavyweight Championship as well as the Impact World Championship, the ECW World Championship and the WWE Championship), and UFC Hall of Famers Dan Severn and Ken Shamrock, who won the UFC Superfight Championship and the NWA World Heavyweight Championship.

=== Rivalry ===
Since MMA's rise to prominence in the 1990s, some pro wrestlers or MMA fighters have been cynical against the other's profession. This can be an attack on the sport as a whole, or acting as a fan dismissing certain actions within that sport. In September of 2023, the WWE and UFC, the two most valuable combat sports-related promotions, began operating under TKO Group Holdings.

In Brazil, the criticism predates the existence of MMA. In a 1971 interview, Hélio Gracie criticized the professional wrestling program Telecatch on Brazilian television, which drew inspiration from American and Mexican pro wrestling, condemning its scripted and theatrical nature as a distortion of legitimate martial arts. Decades later, Hélio's grandson Rener Gracie married Eve Torres, a former WWE champion who also holds a brown belt in Brazilian Jiu-Jitsu and serves as an instructor at the Gracie University.

== MMA records of professional wrestlers ==
Below is a list of professional wrestlers to have appeared in an official Mixed Martial Arts match, and their career win–loss record.

=== Men ===
Name	Nationality	W	L	D	Ref
Tank Abbott	USA	10	15	0	
Peter Aerts	NLD	1	2	0	
Aaron Aguilera	USA	0	1	0	
Akebono	USA/JPN	0	4	0	
Schuyler Andrews	USA	2	1	0	
Yoji Anjo	JPN	0	5	1	
Shinya Aoki	JPN	47	10	1	
Andrei Arlovski	Belarus	34	21	2	
Ricardo Arona	BRA	14	5	0	
Josh Barnett	USA	35	8	0	
Phil Baroni	USA	16	19	0	
Dave Bautista	USA	1	0	0	
Iouri Bekichev	RUS	2	5	0	
Dave Beneteau	CAN	6	5	1	
Dieusel Berto	Haiti	0	3	0	
Scott Bigelow	USA	0	1	0	
Tariel Bitsadze	Georgia	7	6	0	
Dan Bobish	USA	17	9	0	
Stephan Bonnar	USA	15	9	0	
William Brenneman	USA	0	1	0	
Canek	MEX	1	0	0	
Dos Caras Jr.	MEX	9	6	0	
Anthony Carelli	CAN/ITA	0	1	0	
Tim Catalfo	USA	4	2	0	
Hong-man Choi	South Korea	4	5	0	
Mitch Clarke	CAN	11	5	0	
Mark Coleman	USA	16	10	0	
Mirko Cro Cop	Croatia	38	11	3	
Eric Esch	USA	17	10	1	
Don Frye	USA	20	9	1	
Katsuhisa Fujii	JPN	9	18	1	
Kazuyuki Fujita	JPN	18	14	0	
Takaku Fuke	JPN	16	30	5	
Masakatsu Funaki	JPN	40	13	2	
Jack Gallagher	UK	2	0	0	
Matt Ghaffari	IRN/USA	0	1	0	
Rodney Glunder	NLD	25	20	3	
Gary Goodridge	Trinidad and Tobago	23	22	1	
Gerard Gordeau	NLD	2	2	0	
Sotir Gotchev	Bulgaria	3	3	0	
Daniel Gracie	BRA	5	4	1	
Renzo Gracie	BRA	14	7	2	
Rolles Gracie Jr.	BRA	8	4	0	
Sam Greco	AUS	3	1	1	
Jake Hager	USA	3	0	1	
Tony Halme	FIN	0	4	0	
Volk Han	RUS	21	8	1	
Lee Hasdell	ENG	13	16	0	1
Satoshi Hasegawa	JPN	12	17	2	
Chris Haseman	AUS	20	17	3	0
Satoshi Honma	JPN	4	6	3	
Tom Howard	USA	0	8	0	
Mark Hunt	NZL	13	14	1	
Shoichi Ichimiya	JPN	0	2	1	
Mikhail Ilyukhin	RUS	30	11	1	
Masakazu Imanari	JPN	39	22	2	
Egan Inoue	JPN	13	8	0	
Enson Inoue	JPN	12	8	0	
Satoshi Ishii	JPN	25	12	1	
Quinton Jackson	USA	38	14	0	
Dylan James	New Zealand	0	1	0	
Brian Johnston	USA	5	5	0	
Nathan Jones	AUS	0	1	0	
Reuben de Jong	NZ	2	0	0	
Masahito Kakihara	JPN	1	0	0	
Nobuaki Kakuda	JPN	0	1	0	
Rob Kaman	NLD	1	0	0	
Georgi Kandelaki	Georgia	2	2	0	
Hiromitsu Kanehara	JPN	19	27	5	
Aleksandr Karelin	RUS	1	0	0	
Kid Kash	USA	0	1	0	
Kendo Kashin	JPN	1	4	1	
Joop Kasteel	NLD	19	13	0	1
Yusuke Kawaguchi	JPN	18	12	0	
Ryo Kawamura	JPN	19	11	4	
Mark Kerr	USA	15	11	0	
David Khakhaleishvili	Georgia	1	2	0	
Changpuek Kiatsongrit	Thailand	0	0	1	
Katsuya Kitamura	JPN	0	1	0	
Kōji Kitao	JPN	1	2	0	
Yuki Kondo	JPN	64	38	9	
Masayuki Kono	JPN	3	5	0	
Andrei Kopylov	Russia	5	10	0	
Tsuyoshi Kosaka	JPN	28	21	2	
Emil Kristev	Bulgaria	1	3	0	
Viktor Kruger	Austria	0	1	0	
Glenn Kulka	CAN	2	1	0	
Yujiro Kushida	JPN	6	0	2	
Bobby Lashley	USA	15	2	0	
Muhammed Lawal	USA	21	6	1	
Tom Lawlor	USA	11	8	1	
Jérôme Le Banner	FRA	3	3	0	
Dave Legeno	ENG	4	3	0	
Brock Lesnar	USA/CAN	5	3	1	
Jushin Thunder Liger	JPN	0	1	0	
Gene Lydick	USA	1	2	0	
Rodney Mack	USA	1	1	0	
Akira Maeda	JPN	7	5	0	
Brian Mailhot	USA	1	0	0	
Carl Malenko	USA	6	4	0	
Andre Mannaart	NLD	0	3	1	
Daijiro Matsui	JPN	12	28	6	
Justin McCully	USA	11	5	2	
Taka Michinoku	JPN	0	1	0	
Ikuhisa Minowa	JPN	64	42	8	
Frank Mir	USA	19	13	0	
Nick Mitchell	USA	0	1	0	
Kazushi Miyamoto	JPN	0	1	0	
Toshiyuki Moriya	JPN	4	3	0	
Takehiro Murahama	JPN	3	4	1	
Kazunari Murakami	JPN	5	5	0	
Mitsuya Nagai	JPN	4	7	0	
Shinsuke Nakamura	JPN	3	1	0	
Tatsuo Nakano	JPN	0	3	0	
Yuichiro Nagashima	JPN	4	3	0	
Yuji Nagata	JPN	0	2	0	
Yasuhito Namekawa	JPN	25	16	4	
Masayuki Naruse	JPN	9	14	0	
Steve Nelson	USA	3	3	0	
Don Nakaya Nielsen	USA	0	1	0	
José Luis Alvarado Nieves	MEX	0	1	0	
Jan Nortje	ZAF	2	6	0	
Giant Ochiai	JPN	3	3	2	
Naoya Ogawa	JPN	7	2	0	
Sean O'Haire	USA	4	2	0	
Hajime Ohara	JPN	11	3	0	
Michiyoshi Ohara	JPN	0	2	0	
Tito Ortiz	USA	21	12	1	
Alexander Otsuka	JPN	5	13	0	
Alistair Overeem	NLD	47	19	1	
Valentijn Overeem	NLD	32	34	0	
Erik Paulson	USA	11	4	2	
Willie Peeters	NLD	9	10	1	
Craig Pittman	USA	2	2	0	
Mike Polchlopek	USA	1	1	0	
Daniel Puder	USA	8	0	0	
CM Punk	USA	0	1	1	
Kevin Randleman	USA	17	16	0	
Herman Renting	NLD	1	3	0	
Jeremiah Riggs	USA	7	7	0	
Matthew Riddle	USA	8	3	2	
Shannon Ritch	USA	58	89	4	
Ricco Rodriguez	USA	54	27	1	
Rene Rooze	NLD	5	2	0	
Bas Rutten	NLD/USA	28	4	1	
Kazushi Sakuraba	JPN	26	15	1	
Kazuo Sakurada	JPN	0	1	0	
Yukio Sakaguchi	JPN	6	7	1	
Wataru Sakata	JPN	11	14	0	
Naoki Sano	JPN	0	4	0	
Junior dos Santos	BRA	21	10	0	
Bob Sapp	USA	11	16	0	
Kensuke Sasaki	JPN	2	0	0	
Masaaki Satake	JPN	1	8	1	
Hikaru Sato	JPN	24	23	4	
Takeshi Sato	JPN	0	0	1	
Munenori Sawa	JPN	0	1	0	
Bob Schrijber	NLD	20	17	1	
Billy Scott	USA	3	4	0	
Gzim Selmani	NLD	4	2	0	
Dolgorsürengiin Serjbüdee	MNG	1	0	0	
Adrian Serrano	USA	56	29	4	
Dan Severn	USA	101	19	7	
Frank Shamrock	USA	23	10	2	
Ken Shamrock	USA	28	17	2	
Katsuyori Shibata	JPN	4	11	1	
Akira Shoji	JPN	14	17	5	
Montanha Silva	BRA	2	7	0	
Paulo Cesar Silva	BRA	2	6	0	
August Smisl	Austria	0	1	0	
Elvis Sinosic	AUS	8	11	2	
Peter Smit	NLD	0	1	0	
Maurice Smith	USA	14	14	0	
Joe Son	South Korea	0	4	0	
Chael Sonnen	USA	31	17	0	
Krzysztof Soszynski	Poland	26	12	1	
Sergei Sousserov	Russia	2	8	0	
Eric Spicely	USA	13	9	0	
Takashi Sugiura	JPN	1	3	0	
Mitsuhisa Sunabe	JPN	29	11	4	
Shinichi Suzukawa	JPN	2	4	0	
Minoru Suzuki	JPN	30	20	0	
Tim Sylvia	USA	31	10	0	
Nobuhiko Takada	JPN	2	6	2	
Kazuo Takahashi	JPN	30	28	3	1
Yoshihiro Takayama	JPN	1	4	0	
Oleg Taktarov	RUS	17	5	2	
Kiyoshi Tamura	JPN	44	19	3	
Sylvester Terkay	USA	3	1	0	
Elias Theodorou	CAN	19	3	0	
Oli Thompson	ENG	21	16	0	
Sander Thonhauser	NED	11	9	1	
Mick Tierney	IRE	0	6	0	
Zaza Tkeshelashvili	Georgia	9	6	0	
Frank Trigg	USA	21	9	0	
Nobuhiro Tsurumaki	JPN	1	14	0	
Ryuki Ueyama	JPN	12	18	5	
Caol Uno	JPN	34	22	5	
Kozo Urita	JPN	14	12	4	
Bart Vale	USA	1	2	0	
Paul Varelans	USA	9	9	0	
Cain Velasquez	USA	14	3	0	
Dick Vrij	NLD	7	7	1	
Takuya Wada	JPN	20	9	11	
Wakashoyo	JPN	0	6	1	
James Warring	USA	2	1	0	
Yuichi Watanabe	JPN	6	3	0	
Ron Waterman	USA	16	6	2	
George Weingeroff	USA	0	1	0	
Vernon White	USA	26	33	2	
Willy Wilhelm	NLD	1	1	0	
Pete Williams	USA	12	6	0	
Steve Williams	USA	0	1	0	
Willie Williams	USA	9	4	0	
Tadao Yasuda	JPN	2	4	0	
Kenichi Yamamoto	JPN	5	12	2	
Naofumi Yamamoto	JPN	0	1	0	
Yoshihisa Yamamoto	JPN	14	25	1	
Yamato Onodera	JPN	0	2	0	
Ryūshi Yanagisawa	JPN	24	25	9	
Keita Yano	JPN	0	1	0	
Toru Yano	JPN	0	1	0	
Emmanuel Yarbrough	USA	1	2	0	
Yoshiaki Yatsu	JPN	0	2	0	
Hirotaka Yokoi	JPN	11	5	0	
Hawk Younkins	USA	0	1	0	
Gilbert Yvel	NLD	40	16	1	
Nikolai Zouev	RUS	1	4	0	

=== Women ===
Name	Nationality	W	L	D	Ref
Carlos Amano	JPN	1	0	0	
Reggie Bennett	USA	1	1	0	
Daria Berenato	USA	2	1	0	
Shayna Baszler	USA	15	11	0	
Melissa Cervantes	MEX	0	1	0	
Jessamyn Duke	USA	3	5	0	
Esui	Mongolia	2	2	0	
Emi Fujino	JPN	25	13	1	
Jazzy Gabert	GER	1	1	0	
Svetlana Goundarenko	RUS	6	2	0	
Yoshiko Hirano	JPN	2	1	0	
Yumiko Hotta	JPN	5	5	0	
Mai Ichii	JPN	4	5	0	
Chie Ishii	JPN	1	0	0	
Kaoru Ito	JPN	2	3	0	
Fuka Kakimoto	JPN	2	1	0	
Shinobu Kandori	JPN	4	1	0	
Syuri Kondo	JPN	6	3	0	
Aya Koyama	JPN	4	10	1	
Valerie Loureda	USA	4	1	0	
Mika Nagano	JPN	18	13	1	
Kaori Nakayama	JPN	0	2	0	
Michiko Omukai	JPN	1	0	0	
Jeslen Mishelle Saenz (aka Desi Derata)	USA	2	0	0	
Ronda Rousey	USA	12	2	0	
Sexy Star	MEX	2	1	0	
Sumie Sakai	JPN	2	4	1	
Marina Shafir	Moldova	1	2	0	
Natsuki Taiyo	JPN	0	1	0	
Yoko Takahashi	JPN	15	12	2	
Lei'D Tapa	USA	0	2	0	
Paige VanZant	USA	8	5	0	
Megumi Yabushita	JPN	19	23	0	
Yoko Yamada	JPN	6	1	0	

== See also ==
- Combat sport
- History of professional wrestling
- List of mixed martial artists with professional boxing records
- List of multi-sport athletes
- Martial arts
- Sports entertainment
