= Kristev =

Kristev (Bulgarian: Кръстев) is a Bulgarian masculine surname; its feminine counterpart is Kristeva. It may refer to the following notable people:

- Emil Kristev, Bulgarian mixed martial artist
- Julia Kristeva (born 1941), Bulgarian-French philosopher, literary critic and psychoanalyst
