= Chris Dolman =

Dutch martial artist

- Born: Christiaan Dolman; 17 February 1945 (age 81); Amsterdam, Netherlands
- Other names: "Akaoni" ("The Red Demon")
- Height: 6 ft 2 in (1.88 m)
- Weight: 273 lb (124 kg; 19 st 7 lb)
- Division: Heavyweight
- Style: Judo, Sambo, Kyokushin Karate, Greco-Roman wrestling
- Team: Dolman Gym
- Trainer: Jon Bluming
- Rank: 10th Dan Black Belt in Kyokushin Budokai
- Years active: 1972–1996

Other information
- Notable students: Bas Rutten, Gilbert Yvel, Valentijn Overeem, Alistair Overeem, Gegard Mousasi, Joop Kasteel, Dick Vrij, Hans Nijman, Willie Peeters
- Mixed martial arts record from Sherdog
- Last updated on: October 3, 2014

Medal record

Representing the Netherlands

Men's judo

European Championships
Silver medal – second place	1974 London	+93 kg

European Junior Championships
Gold medal – first place	1966 Lyon	+93 kg

Netherlands Championships
Silver medal – second place	1971 Haarlem	+100 kg

Men's sambo

World Games
Gold medal – first place	1985 London	+100 kg

World Championships
Gold medal – first place	1985 San Sebastián	+100 kg
Silver medal – second place	1981 Madrid	+100 kg

World Cup
Gold medal – first place	1969 Moscow	+100 kg
Bronze medal – third place	1985 Sochi	+100 kg

European Championships
Silver medal – second place	1976 Leningrad	+100 kg

Christiaan "Chris" Dolman (born 17 February 1945) is a Dutch retired judoka, sambo fighter and wrestler. He won a silver medal at the 1974 European Judo Championships and a gold at the 1985 World Sambo Championships, counting as the first non-Russian sambo world champion, and has over 40 national and 10 international championships. He is known for his career in Fighting Network Rings and for his role training several Dutch Mixed Martial Artists and Kickboxers, among them Bas Rutten, Alistair and Valentijn Overeem, Gilbert Yvel and Gegard Mousasi.

== Career ==
Dolman started training judo under Jon Bluming at the Tung-Yen dojo while in college. He became a professional competitor shortly after. In 1970, he extended his competition to sambo by taking part in an international tournament in Moscow. Reportedly, Dolman had no sambo experience, having watched his first practice session of the art two days before the event, and still he dominated the tournament with just his judo and wrestling training.

His first visit to the Japanese rings was in 1976, backing Willem Ruska during his professional wrestling match against Antonio Inoki in New Japan Pro-Wrestling. Inspired by this kind of competition, he celebrated a tournament of modern pankration in Holland in 1981. In 1984, Dolman had his own professional wrestling debut in Universal Wrestling Federation, wrestling Kazuo Yamazaki in a different style fight which Dolman won by armbar.

After UWF's demise, Dolman was contacted by Akira Maeda for his Fighting Network Rings promotion. Leading a stable of Dutch apprentices, which included Dick Vrij, Gilbert Yvel, Valentijn Overeem and other names, Dolman became Maeda's first rival in Rings. He would win the inaugural Rings Mega Battle Tournament in 1993 defeating Maeda in the finals, although the Japanese got revenge on him eliminating him from the 1993 edition. After being eliminated by Yoshihisa Yamamoto the next year, Dolman would stop competing in the tournament, dedicating himself fully to his stablemaster role. His final in-ring match was in 1995, defeating his underling Joop Kasteel.

According to Jon Bluming, Dolman challenged the Gracie family several times during his stint in Rings, but they never answered his letters.

He currently teaches at the Chakuriki/Pancration Gym along with Thom Harinck and leads the RINGS Holland promotion.

== Championships and accomplishments ==
=== Greco-Roman/Freestyle Wrestling ===
- 1966 Benelux Championship
- 1967 Benelux Championship
- 1968 Benelux Championship
- 1969 Benelux Championship

=== Judo ===
- 1974 European Judo Championship 93 kg class silver medalist
- 1966 European Youth Judo Championship
- 1965 Netherlands Youth Judo Championship
- Eight times Netherlands Judo Championship

=== Professional Wrestling ===
- Fighting Network Rings
  - Mega Battle Tournament (1992)

=== Sambo ===
- 1969 World Sambo Championship gold medalist
- 1985 World Sambo Championship gold medalist
- World Games 1985 Sambo Championship 100 kg class gold medalist
- National A.A.U. Sambo Championship (1978)
