= 2001 in Fighting Network Rings =

Mixed martial arts events

Information
- First date: January 28, 2001
- Last date: December 21, 2001

Events
- Total events: 15

Fights
- Total fights: 125
- Title fights: 2

Chronology
2000 in RINGS	2001 in Fighting Network Rings	2002 in RINGS

The year 2001 is the seventh year in the history of Fighting Network Rings, a mixed martial arts promotion based in Japan. In 2001 Fighting Network Rings held 15 events beginning with, Rings Holland: Heroes Live Forever.

== Title fights ==
Title fights in 2001
Weight class				Method	Round	Time	Event	Notes
Openweight	Fedor Emelianenko	def.	Renato Sobral	Decision (Unanimous)	2	5:00	Rings: 10th Anniversary	(Note: For The Fighting Network Rings Openweight Championship.)
Middleweight	Ricardo Arona	def.	Gustavo Machado	TKO (Punches)	1	1:29	Rings: 10th Anniversary	(Note: For The Fighting Network Rings Middleweight Championship.)

== Events list ==
#	Event title	Date	Arena	Location
70	Rings: World Title Series 5	December 21, 2001	Yokohama Cultural Gymnasium	Kanagawa, Japan
69	Rings Holland: Some Like It Hard	December 2, 2001	Vechtsebanen Sport Hall	Utrecht, Netherlands
68	Rings Lithuania: Bushido Rings 3	November 10, 2001	Vilnius Palace of Concerts and Sports	Vilnius, Lithuania
67	Rings: World Title Series 4	October 20, 2001	Yoyogi National Stadium Gym 2	Tokyo, Japan
66	Rings: Battle Genesis Vol. 8	September 21, 2001	Korakuen Hall	Tokyo, Japan
65	Rings: 10th Anniversary	August 11, 2001	Ariake Coliseum	Tokyo, Japan
64	Rings: World Title Series 2	June 15, 2001	Yokohama Cultural Gymnasium	Kanagawa, Japan
63	Rings Holland: No Guts, No Glory	June 10, 2001	Sport Hall Zuid	Amsterdam, North Holland, Netherlands
62	Rings Lithuania: Bushido Rings 2	May 8, 2001	Vilnius Palace of Concerts and Sports	Vilnius, Lithuania
61	Rings: World Title Series 1	April 20, 2001	Yoyogi National Stadium Gym 2	Tokyo, Japan
60	Rings Russia: Russia vs. Bulgaria	April 6, 2001	Yekaterinburg Sports Palace	Yekaterinburg, Russia
59	Rings: Battle Genesis Vol. 7	March 20, 2001	Differ Ariake Arena	Tokyo, Japan
58	Rings USA: Battle of Champions	March 17, 2001	Harveys Casino Hotel	Council Bluffs, Iowa
57	Rings: King of Kings 2000 Final	February 24, 2001	Ryogoku Kokugikan Sumo Arena	Tokyo, Japan
56	Rings Holland: Heroes Live Forever	January 28, 2001	Vechtsebanen Sport Hall	Utrecht, Netherlands

== Rings Holland: Heroes Live Forever ==
Rings Holland: Heroes Live Forever was an event held on January 28, 2001, at The Vechtsebanen Sport Hall in Utrecht, Netherlands.

=== Results ===
Main Card
Weight class				Method	Round	Time	Notes
	Joop Kasteel	def.	Yuriy Kochkine	Decision (Unanimous)	2	5:00
	Rodney Glunder	def.	Ricardo Fyeet	Submission (Guillotine Choke)	2	1:04
	Lee Hasdell	vs.	Sander Thonhauser	No Contest	1	0:00
	Gilbert Ballantine	def.	Brian Lo-A-Njoe	TKO (Punches and Knee)	2	2:09
	Antoni Hardonk	def.	Peter Verschuren	TKO (Cut)	1	3:05
	Remco Pardoel	def.	Marc Emmanuel	Decision (Unanimous)	2	5:00
	Mustafa Azoufri	vs.	Jordi Soederhuizen	Draw	2	5:00
	Piet van Gammeren	def.	Herman Renting	Decision (Unanimous)	2	5:00
	Nordin Bensellam	def.	Marc van Rooyen	Decision (Unanimous)	2	5:00
	Herman van Tol	def.	Sander MacKilljan	Submission (Keylock)	1	2:08
	Jerry Mooldijk	def.	Roberto Lukus	DQ (Kicking on the Ground)	1	3:01

== Rings: King of Kings 2000 Final ==
Rings: King of Kings 2000 Final was an event held on February 24, 2001, at The Ryogoku Kokugikan Sumo Arena in Tokyo, Japan.

=== Results ===
Main Card
Weight class				Method	Round	Time	Notes
	Antônio Rodrigo Nogueira	def.	Valentijn Overeem	Submission (Arm-Triangle Choke)	1	1:20
	Renato Sobral	def.	Kiyoshi Tamura	Decision (Majority)	2	5:00
	Ryushi Yanagisawa	def.	Wataru Sakata	Decision (Split)	2	5:00
	Valentijn Overeem	def.	Randy Couture	Submission (Guillotine Choke)	1	0:56
	Antônio Rodrigo Nogueira	def.	Hiromitsu Kanehara	Submission (Rear-Naked Choke)	2	0:27
	Alistair Overeem	def.	Vladimer Tchanturia	Submission (Rear-Naked Choke)	1	1:06
	Valentijn Overeem	def.	Yoshihisa Yamamoto	Submission (Armbar)	1	0:45
	Randy Couture	def.	Tsuyoshi Kosaka	Decision (Unanimous)	2	5:00
	Antônio Rodrigo Nogueira	def.	Magomedkhan Gamzatkhanov	Decision (Unanimous)	2	5:00
	Hiromitsu Kanehara	def.	Dave Menne	TKO (Punches)	3	3:24

== Rings USA: Battle of Champions ==
Rings USA: Battle of Champions was an event held on March 17, 2001, at The Harveys Casino Hotel in Council Bluffs, Iowa.

=== Results ===
Main Card
Weight class				Method	Round	Time	Notes
	Jeremy Horn	def.	Griffen Reynaud	Submission (Punches)	1	2:55
	Jermaine Andre	def.	Masaya Kojima	TKO (Punch)	1	3:29
	Kerry Schall	def.	John Dixson	Submission (Hammerlock)	1	1:19
	Chatt Lavender	def.	LaVerne Clark	Submission (Armbar)	2	1:04
	Matt Hughes	def.	Brett Al-azzawi	Submission (Armbar)	1	3:27
	Bobby Hoffman	def.	Zane Frazier	Submission (Armbar)	1	1:34
	Naoyuki Kotani	def.	Curtis Brigham	Submission (Kimura)	2	1:59
	Rich Franklin	def.	Travis Fulton	TKO (Broken Hand)	1	5:00
	Joe Doerksen	def.	Scott Ventimiglia	Submission (Armbar)	1	2:33

== Rings: Battle Genesis Vol. 7 ==
Rings: Battle Genesis Vol. 7 was an event held on March 20, 2001, at The Differ Ariake Arena in Tokyo, Japan.

=== Results ===
Main Card
Weight class				Method	Round	Time	Notes
	Masayuki Naruse	def.	Ricardo Fyeet	Submission (Toe Hold)	1	3:46
	Takehiro Murahama	def.	Brian Lo-A-Njoe	Submission (Kneebar)	1	4:49
	Yasuhito Namekawa	def.	Takashi Sonoda	Submission (Armbar)	1	0:43
	Sokun Koh	def.	Ryuki Ueyama	TKO (Kimura)	1	2:16
	Naoyuki Taira	def.	Taro Minato	Submission (Armlock)	1	6:37
	Kazuki Okubo	def.	Motomichi Mori	Decision (Majority)	2	5:00

== Rings Russia: Russia vs. Bulgaria ==
Rings Russia: Russia vs. Bulgaria was an event held on April 6, 2001, at The Yekaterinburg Sports Palace in Yekaterinburg, Russia.

=== Results ===
Main Card
Weight class				Method	Round	Time	Notes
	Magomedkhan Gamzatkhanov	def.	Andrei Kopylov	Decision	2	5:00
	Bazigit Atajev	def.	Dimitar Doichinov	TKO	1	4:12
	Emil Kristev	def.	Iouri Bekichev	Decision (1-0 Points)	1	10:00
	Borislav Jeliazkov	def.	Konstantin Uriadov	Submission (Rear Naked Choke)	1	3:09
	Mikhail Ilyukhin	def.	Martin Lazarov	Decision (4-0 Points)	1	10:00
	Fedor Emelianenko	def.	Mihail Apostolov	Submission (Rear-Naked Choke)	1	1:03
	Eduard Churakov	def.	Valentin Davidov	KO	1	9:20
	Kestutis Smirnovas	def.	Ruslan Mirzoev	Decision (3-2 Points)	1	10:00

== Rings: World Title Series 1 ==
Rings: World Title Series 1 was an event held on April 20, 2001, at The Yoyogi National Stadium Gym 2 in Yoyogi National Stadium Gym 2.

=== Results ===
Main Card
Weight class				Method	Round	Time	Notes
	Gustavo Machado	def.	Kiyoshi Tamura	Decision (Majority)	2	5:00
	Bobby Hoffman	def.	Ryushi Yanagisawa	Decision (Unanimous)	2	5:00
	Jeremy Horn	def.	Iouri Bekichev	Submission (Arm-Triangle Choke)	1	0:50
	Fedor Emelianenko	def.	Kerry Schall	Submission (Armbar)	1	1:47
	Yasuhito Namekawa	def.	Hiroshi Imamura	Submission (Kneebar)	1	1:48
	Jiro Wakabayashi	vs.	Naoyuki Kotani	Draw	3	5:00

== Rings Lithuania: Bushido Rings 2 ==
Rings Lithuania: Bushido Rings 2 was an event held on May 8, 2001, at The Vilnius Palace of Concerts and Sports in Vilnius, Lithuania.

=== Results ===
Main Card
Weight class				Method	Round	Time	Notes
	Magomedkhan Gamzatkhanov	def.	Zaza Tkeshelashvili	Submission (Armlock)	1	0:00
	Mikhail Ilyukhin	def.	Kestutis Smirnovas	Submission (Achilles Lock)	1	0:00
	Andrei Kopylov	def.	Egidijus Valavicius	Decision (4-0 Points)	2	0:00
	Ricardas Rocevicius	def.	Victor Yerohin	Submission (Achilles Lock)	2	0:00
	Bazigit Atajev	def.	Rolandas Digrys	Submission (Armbar)	1	0:00
	Remigijus Kazaciunas	def.	Emil Kristev	TKO	0	0:00
	Valentin Golubovskij	def.	Iouri Bekichev	Decision (2-0 Points)	2	0:00
	Jordanas Poskaitis	def.	Arunas Nenartas	Decision	2	0:00

== Rings Holland: No Guts, No Glory ==
Rings Holland: No Guts, No Glory was an event held on June 10, 2001, at The Sport Hall Zuid in Amsterdam, North Holland, Netherlands.

=== Results ===
Main Card
Weight class				Method	Round	Time	Notes
	Bob Schrijber	vs.	Bobby Hoffman	Draw	2	5:00
	Cheick Kongo	def.	Andre Tete	Submission (Heel Hook)	1	3:20
	Paul Cahoon	def.	Joop Kasteel	KO (Punch)	2	4:00
	Cyrille Diabate	vs.	Rodney Glunder	Draw	2	5:00
	Christophe Lardot	vs.	Brian Lo-A-Njoe	Draw	2	5:00
	Marc Emmanuel	def.	Sander Thonhauser	Submission (Keylock)	2	0:36
	Remco Pardoel	vs.	Herman van Tol	Draw	2	5:00
	Dave van der Veen	def.	Edmunds Kirsis	DQ	1	2:47
	Dave Vader	def.	Fred van Doesburg	KO (Knee)	1	1:12
	Jordi Soederhuizen	def.	Nordin Bensellam	Submission (Achilles Lock)	1	4:46
	Jerry Mooldijk	vs.	Arnoud Ritsema	Draw	2	5:00
	Marc van Rooyen	def.	Michel van der Heijden	KO (Knee)	1	4:46

== Rings: World Title Series 2 ==
Rings: World Title Series 2 was an event held on June 15, 2001, at The Yokohama Cultural Gymnasium in Kanagawa, Japan.

=== Results ===
Main Card
Weight class				Method	Round	Time	Notes
	Ricardo Arona	def.	Hiromitsu Kanehara	Submission (Kneebar)	2	0:53
	Renato Sobral	def.	Tsuyoshi Kosaka	Decision (Majority)	2	5:00
	Mikhail Ilyukhin	def.	Borislav Jeliazkov	Submission (Armbar)	2	2:06
	Chris Haseman	def.	Alexandre Ferreira	Submission (Guillotine Choke)	1	3:03
	Yasuhito Namekawa	def.	Masutatsu Yano	Submission (Guillotine Choke)	2	0:22
	Bazigit Atajev	def.	Maynard Marcum	KO (Punch)	1	1:08

== Rings: 10th Anniversary ==
Rings: 10th Anniversary was an event held on August 11, 2001, at Ariake Coliseum in Tokyo, Japan.

=== Results ===
Main Card
Weight class				Method	Round	Time	Notes
	Matt Hughes	def.	Hiromitsu Kanehara	Decision (Majority)	3	5:00
	Tsuyoshi Kosaka	def.	Koba Tkeshelashvili	KO (Knee)	1	2:17
Middleweight	Ricardo Arona	def.	Gustavo Machado	TKO (Punches)	1	1:29	(Note: For The Fighting Network Rings Middleweight Championship.)
	Bazigit Atajev	def.	Aaron Brink	KO (Spinning Back Kick)	1	1:09
	Hirotaka Yokoi	def.	Ricardo Fyeet	Submission (Armbar)	1	2:34
Openweight	Fedor Emelianenko	def.	Renato Sobral	Decision (Unanimous)	2	5:00	(Note: For The Fighting Network Rings Openweight Championship.)
	Bobby Hoffman	def.	Mikhail Ilyukhin	TKO (Corner Stoppage)	2	5:00
	Ricardo Arona	def.	Jeremy Horn	Decision (Majority)	2	5:00
	Gustavo Machado	def.	Chris Haseman	Decision (Unanimous)	3	5:00

== Rings: Battle Genesis Vol. 8 ==
Rings: Battle Genesis Vol. 8 was an event held on September 21, 2001, at Korakuen Hall in Tokyo, Japan.

=== Results ===
Main Card
Weight class				Method	Round	Time	Notes
	Yasuhito Namekawa	def.	Dexter Casey	Submission (Armbar)	1	1:44
	Genki Sudo	def.	Brian Lo-A-Njoe	Submission (Triangle Choke)	1	2:17
	Hirotaka Yokoi	def.	Masaya Kojima	Submission (Armlock)	1	2:12
	Hidetaka Monma	def.	Hiroyuki Ito	Decision (Majority)	3	5:00
	Takumi Yano	def.	Goro Kobayashi	Technical Submission (Rear Naked Choke)	1	3:14
	Naoyuki Kotani	def.	Hideo Tokoro	Decision (Majority)	3	5:00

== Rings: World Title Series 4 ==
Rings: World Title Series 4 was an event held on October 20, 2001, at The Yoyogi National Stadium Gym 2 in Tokyo, Japan.

=== Results ===
Main Card
Weight class				Method	Round	Time	Notes
	Hiromitsu Kanehara	def.	Kelly Jacobs	TKO (Lost Points)	2	1:51
	Egidijus Valavicius	def.	Yasuhito Namekawa	Towel (Punches)	1	2:18
	Fedor Emelianenko	def.	Ryushi Yanagisawa	Decision (Unanimous)	3	5:00
	Curtis Brigham	def.	Kenichi Ogata	Submission (Rear Naked Choke)	1	0:43
	Chris Haseman	def.	Koba Tkeshelashvili	Decision (Unanimous)	3	5:00
	Lee Hasdell	def.	Georgi Tonkov	KO (Flying Knee)	1	4:22
	Hirotaka Yokoi	def.	Ken Orihashi	TKO (Lost Points)	1	3:14
	Gen Isono	def.	Eriya Matsuda	Decision (Unanimous)	2	5:00

== Rings Lithuania: Bushido Rings 3 ==
Rings Lithuania: Bushido Rings 3 was an event held on November 10, 2001, at The Vilnius Palace of Concerts and Sports in Vilnius, Lithuania.

=== Results ===
Main Card
Weight class				Method	Round	Time	Notes
	Hirotaka Yokoi	def.	Kestutis Smirnovas	Decision	2	5:00
	Igor Vovchanchyn	def.	Ricardas Rocevicius	TKO (Leg Kicks)	2	0:00
	Achmed Labasanov	def.	Mindaugas Kulikauskas	Decision	2	5:00
	Rokas Stambrauskas	def.	Igor Kovalev	KO	1	0:00
	Remigijus Kazaciunas	def.	Hiroyuki Ito	Decision	2	5:00
	Tadeush Cholodinskij	def.	Arsen Bayrambekov	Decision	2	5:00
	Mindaugas Smirnovas	def.	Mindaugas Laurinaitis	Decision	2	5:00
	Roman Gaiko	def.	Sigitas Kekstas	Decision	2	5:00

== Rings Holland: Some Like It Hard ==
Rings Holland: Some Like It Hard was an event held on December 2, 2001, at The Vechtsebanen Sport Hall in Utrecht, Netherlands.

=== Results ===
Main Card
Weight class				Method	Round	Time	Notes
	Rodney Glunder	def.	Paul Cahoon	TKO (Doctor Stoppage)	3	1:53
	Joop Kasteel	def.	Fatih Kocamis	Submission (Armbar)	1	1:57
	Stephan Tapilatu	def.	Brian Lo-A-Njoe	Decision (Unanimous)	2	5:00
	Dave Vader	def.	Hans Roovers	KO (Punch)	1	3:58
	Nordin Bensellam	vs.	Chico Martinez	Draw	2	5:00
	Andre Tete	def.	Rob van Esdonk	KO (Punch)	2	0:28
	Gilbert Ballantine	def.	Daan Kooiman	Submission (Guillotine Choke)	1	2:30
	Cheick Kongo	def.	Dave van der Veen	TKO (Punches)	2	1:25
	Brian Maulany	def.	Jordi Soederhuizen	KO (Punch)	1	4:00
	Marc van Rooyen	def.	Franklin Beuk	Decision (Unanimous)	3	5:00

== Rings: World Title Series 5 ==
Rings: World Title Series 5 was an event held on December 21, 2001, at The Yokohama Cultural Gymnasium in Kanagawa, Japan.

=== Results ===
Main Card
Weight class				Method	Round	Time	Notes
	Hiromitsu Kanehara	def.	Paul Cahoon	Decision (Split)	3	5:00
	Bazigit Atajev	def.	Tsuyoshi Kosaka	Decision (Majority)	3	5:00
	Fedor Emelianenko	def.	Lee Hasdell	Submission (Guillotine Choke)	1	4:10
	Chris Haseman	def.	Egidijus Valavicius	Submission (Armbar)	1	3:08
	Genki Sudo	def.	Kenichi Yamamoto	Submission (Rear Naked Choke)	2	1:46
	Tatsuya Maeda	def.	Stephen Gillinder	Submission (Rear Naked Choke)	2	1:42
	Naoyuki Kotani	def.	Takahito Iida	Submission (Armbar)	1	3:02
	Hidetaka Monma	def.	Kyosuke Sasaki	Decision (Majority)	2	5:00

== See also ==
- Fighting Network Rings
- List of Fighting Network Rings events
