= 1997 in M-1 Global =

Mixed martial arts events

Information
- First date: November 1, 1997
- Last date: November 1, 1997

Events
- Total events: 1

Fights
- Total fights: 12

Chronology
1997 in M-1 Global	1998 in M-1

The year 1997 is the first year in the history of M-1 Global, a mixed martial arts promotion based in Russia. In 1997 M-1 Global held 1 event, M-1 MFC: World Championship 1997.

== Events list ==
#	Event Title	Date	Arena	Location
1	M-1 MFC: World Championship 1997	November 1, 1997		Saint Petersburg, Russia

== M-1 MFC: World Championship 1997 ==
M-1 MFC: World Championship 1997 was an event held on November 1, 1997, in Saint Petersburg, Russia.

=== Results ===
Main Card
Weight class				Method	Round	Time	Notes
	Bob Schrijber	def.	Ruslan Kerselyan	KO (Kick)	1	2:53
	Gilbert Yvel	def.	Oleg Tsygolnik	KO (Punch)	1	1:41
	Sergei Bytchkov	def.	Ronny Rivano	Submission (Achilles Lock)	1	2:51
	Irma Verhoeff	def.	Trina Iknatovic	KO	0	0:00
	Loes Scholten Aalbes	vs.	Elena Panlova	Draw	0	0:00
	Wendy van Maren	vs.	Marina Nikolaeva	Draw	0	0:00
	Ruslan Kerselyan	def.	Colorado Lopez	Submission (Punches)	1	0:11
	Bob Schrijber	def.	Emil Stroka	Submission (Strikes)	1	0:54
	Gilbert Yvel	def.	Sergei Tunic	KO (Punches)	1	1:16
	Oleg Tsygolnik	def.	Pedro Palm	Submission (Rear Naked Choke)	1	0:57
	Sergei Bytchkov	def.	Rodney Glunder	Decision	1	10:00
	Ronny Rivano	def.	Nikita Abramov	Submission (Forearm Choke)	1	4:50

== See also ==
- M-1 Global
