= Ronny Rivano =

Dutch mixed martial artist

- Born: Netherlands
- Nationality: Dutch
- Division: Welterweight
- Style: Karate
- Team: Fysio Sportline
- Years active: 1995–2005

Mixed martial arts record
- Total: 29
- Wins: 13
- By knockout: 7
- By submission: 5
- By decision: 1
- Losses: 13
- By knockout: 4
- By submission: 7
- By decision: 2
- Draws: 3

Other information
- Mixed martial arts record from Sherdog

Ronny Rivano is a Dutch mixed martial artist. He competed in the Welterweight division.

== Mixed martial arts record ==
Professional record breakdown
29 matches	13 wins	13 losses
By knockout	7	4
By submission	5	7
By decision	1	2
Draws	3	

Res.	Record	Opponent	Method	Event	Date	Round	Time	Location	Notes
Loss	13-13-3	Chico Martinez	KO (punches)	Bushido Europe: Rotterdam Rumble	October 9, 2005	1	1:37	Rotterdam, South Holland, Netherlands	
Loss	13-12-3	Robbie Nelson	KO (punch)	Rings Holland: One Moment In Time	December 1, 2002	1	3:01	Utrecht, Netherlands	
Loss	13-11-3	Gilbert Ballantine	KO (punch)	Rings Holland: Saved by the Bell	June 2, 2002	2	1:20	Amsterdam, North Holland, Netherlands	
Loss	13-10-3	Musail Alaudinov	Submission (rear-naked choke)	M-1 MFC: Russia vs. the World 3	April 26, 2002	1	0:58	Saint Petersburg, Russia	
Win	13-9-3	Stephan Tapilatu	TKO (leg injury)	2H2H 4: Simply the Best 4	March 17, 2002	0	N/A	Rotterdam, South Holland, Netherlands	
Loss	12-9-3	Andrey Rudakov	TKO (punches)	IAFC: Pankration World Championship 2001	December 8, 2001	1	0:56	Yaroslavl, Russia	
Win	12-8-3	Danila Veselov	TKO (punches)	M-1 MFC: Russia vs. the World 2	November 11, 2001	1	1:45	Saint Petersburg, Russia	
Win	11-8-3	Stephan Tapilatu	Submission (rear-naked choke)	2H2H 3: Hotter Than Hot	October 7, 2001	1	4:19	Rotterdam, South Holland, Netherlands	
Win	10-8-3	Sergei Zavadsky	TKO (punches)	M-1 MFC: Russia vs. the World 1	April 27, 2001	1	7:30	Saint Petersburg, Russia	
Loss	9-8-3	Sergei Bytchkov	Submission (arm triangle choke)	2H2H 2: Simply The Best	March 18, 2001	1	4:40	Rotterdam, South Holland, Netherlands	
Draw	9-7-3	Robbie Nelson	Draw	It's Showtime: Exclusive	October 22, 2000	2	5:00	Haarlem, North Holland, Netherlands	
Loss	9-7-2	Rafles la Rose	Submission	BOA 2: Battle of Arnhem 2	September 3, 2000	0	0:00	Netherlands	
Win	9-6-2	Marco Holkamp	TKO (strikes)	2H2H 1: 2 Hot 2 Handle	March 5, 2000	1	9:30	Amsterdam, North Holland, Netherlands	
Win	8-6-2	Peter Kaljevic	Decision	AAC 2: Amsterdam Absolute Championship 2	November 27, 1999	1	10:00	Amsterdam, North Holland, Netherlands	
Draw	7-6-2	Ron Post	Draw	It's Showtime: It's Showtime	October 24, 1999	2	5:00	Haarlem, North Holland, Netherlands	
Win	7-6-1	Marco Holkamp	TKO (cut)	WVC 9: World Vale Tudo Championship 9	September 27, 1999	1	3:00	Aruba	
Loss	6-6-1	Rafles la Rose	Submission (triangle choke)	IMA: Night of the Knights 1	June 13, 1999	0	0:00	Badhoevedorp, North Holland, Netherlands	
Win	6-5-1	Pedro van Hemert	TKO (broken nose)	IMA: Back to the Roots	April 24, 1999	0	0:00	Netherlands	
Win	5-5-1	Pedro van Hemert	Submission (choke)	AAC 1: Amsterdam Absolute Championship 1	October 25, 1998	1	1:58	Amsterdam, North Holland, Netherlands	
Loss	4-5-1	Hayato Sakurai	Submission (rear naked choke)	Shooto: Las Grandes Viajes 4	July 29, 1998	1	1:10	Tokyo, Japan	
Win	4-4-1	Oleg Zakharov	Submission (rear naked choke)	IAFC: Pankration European Championship 1998	May 23, 1998	1	6:13	Moscow, Russia	
Win	3-4-1	Vincent Vielvoye	TKO (punches)	IMA: KO Power Tournament	April 12, 1998	1	1:11	Amsterdam, North Holland, Netherlands	
Win	2-4-1	Elton Rol	Submission (rear naked choke)	RDFF 2: Red Devil Free Fight 2	December 7, 1997	0	2:43	Amsterdam, North Holland, Netherlands	
Loss	1-4-1	Sergei Bytchkov	Submission (achilles lock)	M-1 MFC: World Championship 1997	November 1, 1997	1	2:51	Saint Petersburg, Russia	
Win	1-3-1	Nikita Abramov	Submission (forearm choke)	M-1 MFC: World Championship 1997	November 1, 1997	1	4:50	Saint Petersburg, Russia	
Loss	0-3-1	Sergei Bytchkov	Submission (achilles lock)	RDFF 1: Red Devil Free Fight 1	September 27, 1997	3	1:43	Amsterdam, North Holland, Netherlands	
Loss	0-2-1	Jonny van Wanrooy	Decision (unanimous)	Rings Holland: Utrecht at War	June 29, 1997	2	5:00	Utrecht, Netherlands	
Draw	0-1-1	Olaf van der Broek	Draw	IMA: Battle of Styles	October 26, 1996	0	0:00	Netherlands	
Loss	0-1	Piet Bernzen	Decision (unanimous)	Rings Holland: Free Fight	February 19, 1995	1	10:00	Amsterdam, North Holland, Netherlands	

== See also ==
- List of male mixed martial artists
