= Sambo at the World Games =

Sambo was part of the World Games in 1985 in London and again in 1993 in The Hague.

== Medalist ==
=== Men ===
==== −52 kg ====
Games	Gold	Silver	Bronze
1985 London	Santiago Aldecoa (ESP)	Francisco Ayala (ESP)	Jean-Marc Luciani (FRA)
1993 The Hague	Namsrat Baatarbold (MGL)	Abram Agomerian (RUS)	Raibek Mendigaliev (KAZ)

==== −57 kg ====
Games	Gold	Silver	Bronze
1985 London	Iñigo Florzxa (ESP)	Michel Dupère (FRA)	Barry Cooper (GBR)
1993 The Hague	Lakek Akraliev (KAZ)	Sergey Sadorin (RUS)	Rudas Edvardas (LTU)

==== −62 kg ====
Games	Gold	Silver	Bronze
1985 London	Miguel García (ESP)	Giovanni Millite (ITA)	Blas Pérez (ESP)
1993 The Hague	Sergey Ignatenko (RUS)	Andrey Savenkov (KAZ)	Jakim Rakov (BUL)

==== −68 kg ====
Games	Gold	Silver	Bronze
1985 London	Francisco Lorenzo (ESP)	Jorge Bocanegra (ESP)	Stephen Cooper (GBR)
1993 The Hague	Ivan Netov (BUL)	Valeriy Belov (RUS)	José León (ESP)

==== −74 kg ====
Games	Gold	Silver	Bronze
1985 London	Jon Idaretta (ESP)	Ángel Giménez (ESP)	Anthony Hull (GBR)
1993 The Hague	Nikolay Igrautzhkin (RUS)	Michail Zakoliapine (EST)	Algis Mechkouskis (LTU)

==== −82 kg ====
Games	Gold	Silver	Bronze
1985 London	Julen Idaretta (ESP)	Didier Duru (FRA)	Gregory Dixon (USA)
1993 The Hague	Gusein Gaibulajev (RUS)	Majeika Petras (LTU)	Igor Dudich (BLR)

==== −90 kg ====
Games	Gold	Silver	Bronze
1985 London	Eddy Kaspers (NED)	Raúl Alfonso (ESP)	Shepard Pittman (USA)
1993 The Hague	Aleksandr Dunayev (RUS)	Tsevtomir Petrov (BUL)	Ron Angus (CAN)

==== −100 kg ====
Games	Gold	Silver	Bronze
1985 London	William Ward (GBR)	Gerardo Toro (ESP)	Giorgio D'Alessandro (ITA)
1993 The Hague	Vladimir Raumyantsev (RUS)	Rotsevchius Richardas (LTU)	Totot Todorov (BUL)

==== +100 kg ====
Games	Gold	Silver	Bronze
1985 London	Chris Dolman (NED)	Martin Clarke (GBR)	Gary Barber (USA)
1993 The Hague	Vladimir Yemelianov (BLR)	Murat Gasanov (RUS)	Grybauskas Algamantas (LTU)

=== Women ===
==== −48 kg ====
Games	Gold	Silver	Bronze
1985 London	Loli Veguillas (ESP)	Esperanza Torrecilla (ESP)	Franzi Clemencón (CHI)

==== −52 kg ====
Games	Gold	Silver	Bronze
1985 London	Sacramanto Moyano (ESP)	Isabelle Vauttier (FRA)	María Montero (ESP)

==== −56 kg ====
Games	Gold	Silver	Bronze
1985 London	Pilar Pérez (ESP)	Brenda Maxey (USA)	Simone del Prado (FRA)

==== −60 kg ====
Games	Gold	Silver	Bronze
1985 London	Begoña Gómez (ESP)	Ione Irastorza (ESP)	Marianne Baudry (FRA)

==== −64 kg ====
Games	Gold	Silver	Bronze
1985 London	Mercedes Gómez (ESP)	Brigitte Siffeert (FRA)	Maria Hartog (USA)

==== −68 kg ====
Games	Gold	Silver	Bronze
1985 London	Carmén Bellón (ESP)	Jocelyne Sagon (FRA)	Sarah Williams (GBR)

==== −72 kg ====
Games	Gold	Silver	Bronze
1985 London	Isabel Cortabitante (ESP)	Conny Barber (USA)	Yvette Dupère (FRA)

==== −80 kg ====
Games	Gold	Silver	Bronze
1985 London	Mencu Gutiérrez (ESP)	Vega Mayte (ESP)	Fiona Boty (GBR)
