= Gustavo Machado (fighter) =

Brazilian mixed martial arts fighter

- Born: Gustavo Machado da Silva; May 17, 1975 (age 51); Vitória, Brazil
- Other names: Ximu
- Height: 6 ft 0 in (1.83 m)
- Weight: 185 lb (84 kg; 13.2 st)
- Division: Welterweight (former); Middleweight (current)
- Fighting out of: Rio de Janeiro, Brazil
- Team: Gracie Barra Combat Team (2000–present); Gracie Humaitá (occasionally)
- Rank: 5th degree black belt in Brazilian Jiu-Jitsu under Roberto Correa
- Years active: 2000–2017

Mixed martial arts record
- Total: 34
- Wins: 23
- By knockout: 5
- By submission: 5
- By decision: 13
- Losses: 10
- By knockout: 4
- By submission: 1
- By decision: 5
- Draws: 1

Other information
- Mixed martial arts record from Sherdog

Gustavo Machado da Silva (born May 17, 1975) is a Brazilian professional mixed martial artist who has competed for the International Fight League, Shooto, DEEP, RINGS, Pancrase and King of the Cage promotions. Machado was also briefly a member of the IFL New York Pitbulls.

== Mixed martial arts record ==
Professional record breakdown
34 matches	23 wins	10 losses
By knockout	5	4
By submission	5	1
By decision	13	5
Draws	1	

Res.	Record	Opponent	Method	Event	Date	Round	Time	Location	Notes
Loss	23–10–1	Rafael Carvalho	Decision (unanimous)	Smash Fight 2	July 13, 2013	3	5:00	Curitiba, Parana, Brazil	
Win	23–9–1	Ricardo Scrippe de Oliveira	Submission (heel hook)	Watch Out Combat Show 21	September 28, 2012	1	3:09	Rio de Janeiro, Brazil	
Loss	22–9–1	Patrick Côté	KO (punches)	Amazon Forest Combat 2	March 31, 2012	1	2:44	Manaus, Brazil	Fought at Middleweight.
Win	22–8–1	Henrique Oliveira	Decision (unanimous)	MMAAD: MMA Against Dengue	November 27, 2011	3	5:00	Rio de Janeiro, Brazil	Catchweight (178 lbs).
Win	21–8–1	Andres Osorio	Submission (guillotine choke)	X-Combat Ultra MMA: International Grand Prix	May 20, 2011	2	1:02	Rio de Janeiro, Brazil	Catchweight (175 lbs).
Win	20–8–1	Matias Lemon	TKO (punches)	Fatality Arena: 2nd Edition	September 11, 2010	2	1:33	Niterói, Brazil	
Win	19–8–1	Rick Reeves	Decision (split)	Powerhouse World Promotions: War on the Mainland	August 14, 2010	3	5:00	Irvine, California, United States	
Loss	18–8–1	Jordan Smith	Decision (unanimous)	Washington Combat: Battle of the Legends	May 15, 2010	3	5:00	Washington, D.C., District of Columbia	
Win	18–7–1	Rico Washington Sr.	Decision (unanimous)	Bitetti Combat MMA 5	December 12, 2009	3	5:00	Barueri, Brazil	
Win	17–7–1	Matias Lemon	TKO (punches)	X-Combat Ultra MMA	September 20, 2009	1	2:50	Espírito Santo, Brazil	
Win	16–7–1	Jorge Bezerra	Decision (unanimous)	World Fighting Combat	April 24, 2009	3	5:00	Niterói, Brazil	
Win	15–7–1	Pedro Paulo	TKO (corner stoppage)	Shooto: Brazil 10	January 17, 2009	2	5:00	Rio de Janeiro, Brazil	
Win	14–7–1	Alfonso Garate	Submission (heel hook)	TG: The Glory	July 5, 2008	2	3:45	Amazonas, Brazil	
Win	13–7–1	John Cronk	Decision (unanimous)	PCF 1: HellRazor	October 16, 2007	3	5:00	Denver, Colorado, United States	
Loss	12–7–1	Jorge Patino	Decision (split)	Predador FC 6: Octagon	August 25, 2007	3	5:00	São Paulo, Brazil	
Loss	12–6–1	Demian Maia	Decision (unanimous)	Super Challenge 1	October 7, 2006	2	5:00	São Paulo, Brazil	
Win	12–5–1	Leonardo Lucio Nascimento	Decision (unanimous)	Super Challenge 1	October 7, 2006	2	5:00	São Paulo, Brazil	
Win	11–5–1	Marcelo Brito	Decision (split)	Storm Samurai 11	May 21, 2006	3	5:00	Curitiba, Brazil	
Loss	10-5-1	Brad Blackburn	Decision (split)	IFL: Legends Championship 2006	April 29, 2006	3	4:00	Atlantic City, New Jersey, United States	
Loss	10–4–1	Mike Pyle	TKO (punches)	GFC: Team Gracie vs. Team Hammer House	March 3, 2006	1	1:20	Columbus, Ohio, United States	
Loss	10–3–1	Thales Leites	Submission (arm-triangle choke)	SS 8: Storm Samurai 8	July 2, 2005	3	N/A	Brasília, Brazil	
Win	10–2–1	Yuki Sasaki	Decision (majority)	Pancrase: Spiral 2	March 6, 2005	3	5:00	Yokohama, Japan	
Win	9–2–1	Keiichiro Yamamiya	Submission (heel hook)	Pancrase: Brave 11	November 26, 2004	3	1:20	Tokyo, Japan	
Win	8–2–1	Nilson de Castro	Decision (majority)	Meca 11: Meca World Vale Tudo 11	June 5, 2004	3	5:00	Rio de Janeiro, Brazil	
Win	7–2–1	Allan Goes	TKO (retirement)	Heat FC 2: Evolution	December 18, 2003	1	5:00	Natal, Rio Grande do Norte, Brazil	
Loss	6–2–1	Benji Radach	KO (punches)	KOTC 28: More Punishment	August 16, 2003	1	1:31	Reno, Nevada, United States	
Win	6–1–1	Nate Quarry	Decision (unanimous)	KOTC 25: Flaming Fury	June 29, 2003	3	5:00	San Jacinto, California, United States	
Draw	5–1–1	Yuki Sasaki	Draw	Deep: 4th Impact	March 30, 2002	3	5:00	Nagoya, Japan	
Win	5–1	Jorge Patino	Submission (heel hook)	Meca 6: Meca World Vale Tudo 6	January 31, 2002	1	2:00	Curitiba, Brazil	
Loss	4–1	Ricardo Arona	TKO (leg kick and punches)	Rings: 10th Anniversary	August 11, 2001	1	1:29	Tokyo, Japan	
Win	4–0	Chris Haseman	Decision (unanimous)	Rings: 10th Anniversary	August 11, 2001	2	5:00	Tokyo, Japan	
Win	3–0	Kiyoshi Tamura	Decision (majority)	Rings: World Title Series 1	April 20, 2001	2	5:00	Tokyo, Japan	
Win	2–0	Jose de Oliveira	Decision (unanimous)	Meca 3: Meca World Vale Tudo 3	November 14, 2000	3	5:00	Curitiba, Brazil	
Win	1–0	Wataru Sakata	TKO (cut)	Rings: Battle Genesis Vol. 6	September 5, 2000	1	1:35	Tokyo, Japan	
