= Big Mo T =

Dutch mixed martial artist

- Born: Netherlands
- Nationality: Dutch
- Height: 198.12 cm (6 ft 6 in)
- Weight: 117.93 kg (260 lb; 18 st 8 lb)
- Division: Heavyweight
- Team: Dolman Gym
- Years active: 1999 - 2000

Mixed martial arts record
- Total: 5
- Wins: 2
- By knockout: 1
- Unknown: 1
- Losses: 3
- By knockout: 3

Other information
- Mixed martial arts record from Sherdog

Big Mo T is a Dutch mixed martial artist who competed in the Heavyweight division.

== Mixed martial arts record ==
Professional record breakdown
5 matches	2 wins	3 losses
By knockout	1	3
Unknown	1	0

Res.	Record	Opponent	Method	Event	Date	Round	Time	Location	Notes
Win	2–3	Glenn Brasdorp	DQ	Rings Holland: Di Capo Di Tutti Capi	June 4, 2000	1	1:23	Utrecht, Netherlands	
Loss	1–3	Rob van Esdonk	TKO (knee to the body)	Rings Holland: There Can Only Be One Champion	February 6, 2000	1	4:58	Utrecht, Netherlands	
Win	1–2	Sander MacKilljan	KO (punch)	Rings Holland: The Kings of the Magic Ring	June 20, 1999	1	1:39	Utrecht, Netherlands	
Loss	0–2	Gilbert Yvel	KO (flying knee)	Rings Holland: Judgement Day	February 7, 1999	1	1:59	Amsterdam, North Holland, Netherlands	
Loss	0–1	Bob Schrijber	KO	FFH: Free Fight Gala	January 9, 1999	0	0:00	Beverwijk, North Holland, Netherlands	

== See also ==
- List of male mixed martial artists
