= Wataru Sakata =

Japanese professional wrestler and mixed martial arts fighter

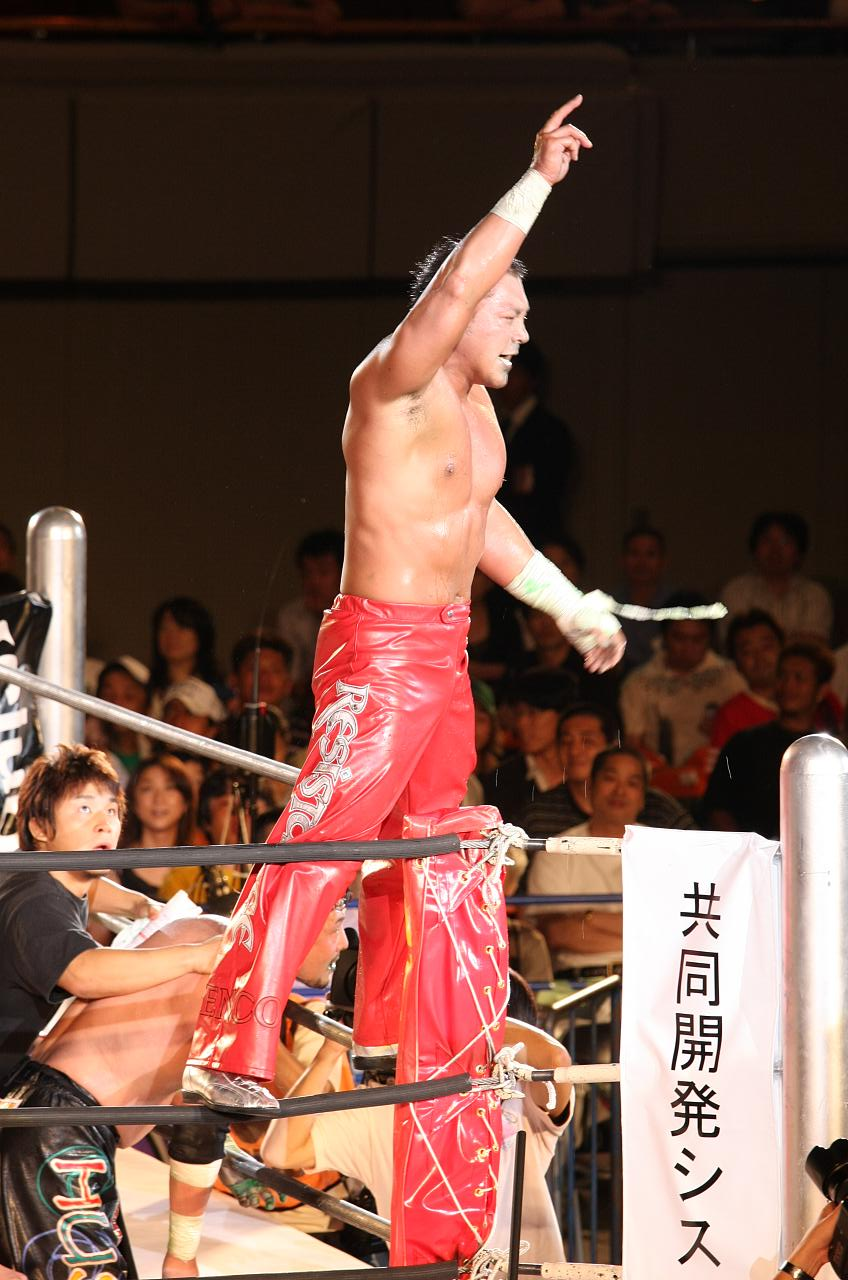
- Born: March 11, 1973 (age 53); Inazawa, Aichi, Japan
- Native name: 坂田 亘
- Nationality: Japanese
- Height: 1.75 m (5 ft 9 in)
- Weight: 88 kg (194 lb)
- Division: Light Heavyweight
- Style: MMA, Kyokushin karate

Mixed martial arts record
- Total: 27
- Wins: 13
- By knockout: 4
- By submission: 6
- By decision: 3
- Losses: 14
- By knockout: 2
- By submission: 6
- By decision: 6

Other information
- Mixed martial arts record from Sherdog

Wataru Sakata (坂田 亘, Sakata Wataru; born March 11, 1973 in Inazawa, Aichi, Japan) is a Japanese retired mixed martial artist and professional wrestler. A professional MMA competitor from 1994 until 2016, Sakata fought for Fighting Network RINGS, Pride FC, Deep and Rizin Fighting Federation, and holds notable victories over RINGS King of Kings 2000 Tournament runner up Valentijn Overeem, UFC 23 Middleweight Tournament winner Kenichi Yamamoto, ADCC bronze medallist and RINGS Light Heavyweight title contender Chris Haseman, and NCAA All-American and UFC veteran Branden Lee Hinkle.

== Career ==
A former Kyokushin karateka, Sakata trained in professional wrestling at Animal Hamaguchi's gym and joined Akira Maeda's Fighting Network RINGS immediately after, training in shoot wrestling.

=== Fighting Network RINGS ===
Sakata debuted in RINGS in 1994 against Nobuhiro Tsurumaki. Making the transition to mixed martial arts before most of his native colleagues, he started to take part in shootfights the same year of his debut.

Over the years, Sakata would develop a rivalry with Willie Peeters in a long series of shootfighting bouts. Peeters defeated Wataru by TKO on their first fight On November 16, 1995, and they went to fight a rematch on June 29, 1996. During the latter, Sakata broke late a toehold and injured Peeters, who retaliated by illegally knocking him out with a close-fisted punch. Although the act gave Peeters a red card, he would win by KO due palm strikes. The two met again on August 24, where Sakata was dominated in a grappling contest and defeated by north/south choke.

Sakata would face Peeters again under different rules in a RINGS Holland event on February 8, 1998, but although he performed dominantly for the first time, he lost a controversial decision, as the Dutch referee invalidated a finishing hold by Sakata while allowing Peeters to throw illegal strikes. Wataru finally got his revenge on June 27, making Peeters tap out in under a minute by ankle lock. Around this time, Sakata would also get important submissions wins over Valentijn Overeem.

In 1999, Sakata participated at the King of Kings MMA tournament, but he was eliminated at the first round by Renzo Gracie, with the Brazilian taking him down and submitting him. Upon returning from the tournament, he faced Branden Lee Hinkle in a more successful match: the two fighters exchanged armbars before Hinkle got the mount, but Sakata countered with his teammate Tsuyoshi Kohsaka's "TK scissors" reversal and locked a leglock that broke Hinkle's knee for the win.

The next year, Sakata would face Pancrase fighter Ryushi Yanagisawa, a natural heavyweight, in a special match. Sakata lost an uneventful decision.

Sakata also had part in a controversial moment in RINGS history when he was legitimately attacked by Akira Maeda in front of the cameras, due to Maeda being unsatisfied with Wataru's performance earlier in the event.

=== Pro Wrestling Zero-One ===
When RINGS collapsed in 2002, Sakata participated in PRIDE Fighting Championships fights and joined Pro Wrestling Zero-One as a freelancer. His wrestling ventures increased over time, and he finally joined Zero-One full-time. Sakata started teaming up with fellow RINGS wrestler Hirotaka Yokoi, but his greatest highlights came from his solo career, winning the Tenka-Ichi Junior Tournament after big wins over Ikuto Hidaka, Low Ki, Dick Togo and Naohiro Hoshikawa. The tournament gained him the vacant WORLD-1 Junior Heavyweight Championship, and he later defeated Low Ki again for the NWA/UPW/Zero-One International Junior Heavyweight Championship, which solidified his status as the new junior ace of the company. However, after retaining his double championship before Jun Kasai, Hidaka and Homicide, he shocked pundits by vacating it and moving up to heavyweight division. Though a tough perspective, it wasn't fruitless, as Sakata won the NWA Intercontinental Tag Team Championship with Masato Tanaka from Shinjiro Otani and Takao Omori.

=== Hustle ===
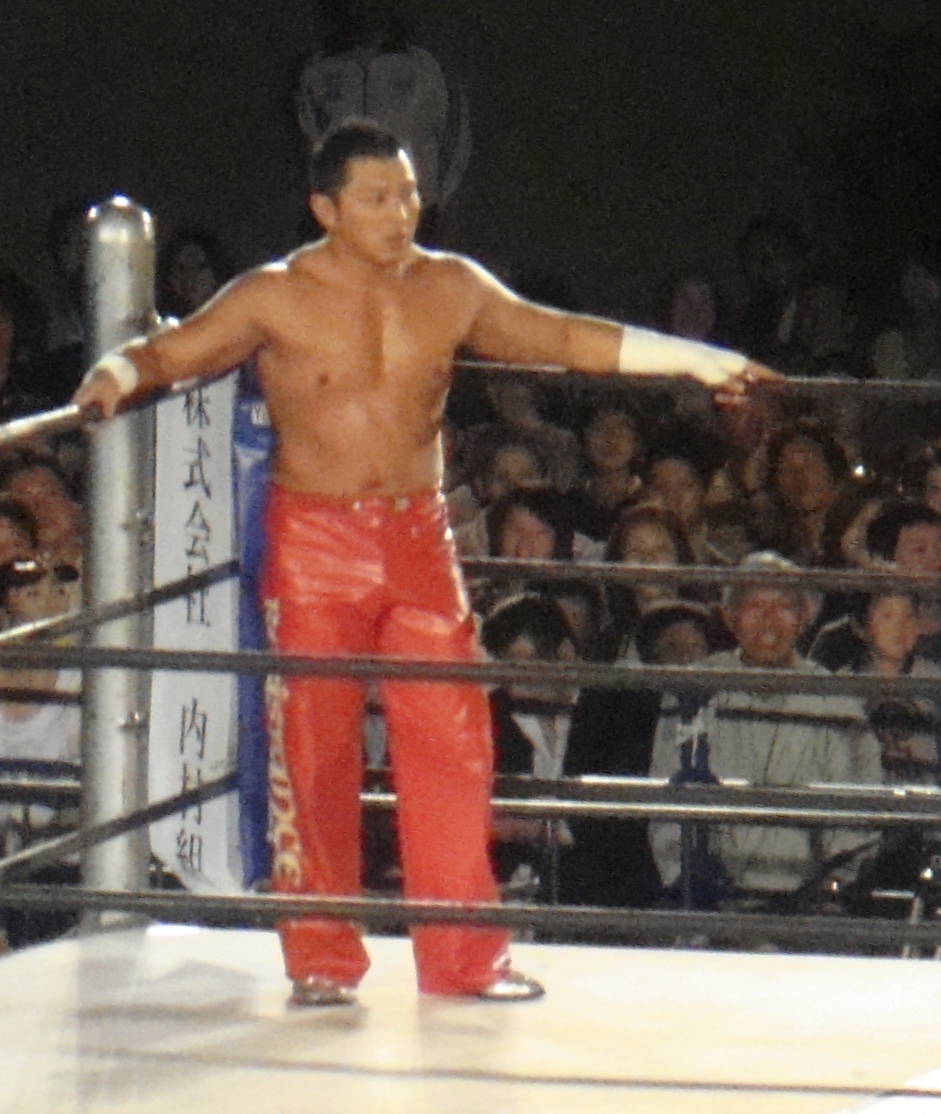
Sakata in Hustle.

In 2004, Sakata started appearing in off-beat wrestling "opera" federation Hustle due to its business relationship with Zero-One. After a match in his home promotion, Sakata was approached by Private Shimada and offered a place in Generalissimo Takada's villainous Monster Army, but Wataru rejected the offer and gave Shimada a tombstone piledriver, announcing he was going to join babyface faction Hustle Army instead. As part of this faction, Sakata was placed in matches against fellow MMA fighters from the Monster Army like Kevin Randleman and Dan Bobish, sometimes teaming up with Shamoji Fujii. However, Sakata was later put in a hair vs. hair match against Umanosuke Anjo and was defeated, being forced to shave his head, which took its toll on his morale. Declaring himself to be unworthy of the Hustle Army, he ran away from the stable and instead worked to be accepted in Monster Army, but he was rejected after losing to Toshiaki Kawada in his entrance test.

Now free, Sakata teamed up with other unaligned wrestlers like Mark Coleman, Takehiro Murahama and Ryoji Sai, which he called unofficially "Sakata Army". His team grew stronger, winning the Hustle Tag Team Championship from Genichiro Tenryu and Tadao Yasuda and later adding Tenryu himself when Sakata lost a match to him and asked him to be the stable's advisor. Wataru also gained the support of Yuko Aoki as his valet for a time after saving her from a beatdown by general manager Hiroko Suzuki. However, his momentum came to an end after Sakata received a knee injury (kayfabe) by Kawada, which stunted his performance; this made them lose the titles against Erika and Margaret, as well as the finals of the Hustle King Memorial tournament. Enraged for the loss, Tenryu turned against him and left Sakata Army to join Monster Army, leaving the stable further depowered. In order to recover from those failures, Wataru introduced himself as a candidate to the new general manager job, which he shockingly won after a fan poll, and also enlisted the help of former GM assistant RG. However, Sakata was then challenged by Tokyo Gurentai and their associate Minoru Suzuki, who defeated Wataru and his group in Hustlemania 2006. Again, the loss made Sakata and RG break up, and they feuded with each other for some time with the help of Suzuki. In early 2007, after being repeatedly beaten down by Tiger Jeet Singh, Wataru finally came to his senses and re-joined the Hustle Army, bringing Ryoji Sai with him.

Right after Sakata's return to the Hustle Army, its leader Naoya Ogawa was bribed by Generalissimo Takada into turning heel and joining him, so Sakata and HG worked to replace him. The same year, Sakata married to Eiko Koike, who was also introduced to Hustle as "Hustle Yosei". Sakata' and HG's first effort was put into their feud with "Fire Monster" ACHICHI, the evil version of Shinjiro Otani, as well as Giant Vabo, Scott Norton and the rest of Monster Army's gaijin mercenaries. However, Sakata's greatest moment would be when he volunteered to fight The Esperanza at the next Hustlemania. Although Wataru got outclassed and was about to be finished off, his wife Eiko intervened and weakened Esperanza with her magic powers, which allowed Sakata to hit him with a superkick and pin his foe. Wataru became the first Hustle Army member to defeat The Esperanza after HG and TAJIRI had failed in do so, thus solidifying himself as Hustle's top face.

In 2008, Sakata participated in the Hustle Grand Prix, in which the winner could ask a wish inside the company, in order to wish for the disbandment of the Monster Army. Despite beating TAJIRI, Shiro Koshinaka and even the huge Bono-kun, he lost in the finals to Toshiaki Kawada. Depressed, Sakata left the company and secluded himself in a nattō field in order to meditate, later returning as a masked superhero-like character named Nattoman. He started to intervene in matches, trying to help Hustle army members yet often causing them trouble by accident, until he was identified as Sakata and forced to return to his former self. Sakata stayed with the company until its closure in 2009.

== Personal life ==
Sakata was married to model Eiko Koike on August 29, 2007. They have one child together.

== Championships and accomplishments ==
=== Mixed martial arts ===
- Fighting Network RINGS

- RINGS Light-Heavyweight Title Tournament 1997 - Third place

=== Professional wrestling ===
- Hustle

- Hustle Super Tag Team Championship (1 time) - with Ryouji Sai

- Pro Wrestling Zero-One

- NWA Intercontinental Tag Team Championship (1 time) - with Masato Tanaka
- Zero1 International Junior Heavyweight Championship (1 time)
- Tenkaichi Junior (2002)

- Pro Wrestling World-1

- World-1 Junior Heavyweight Championship (1 time)

== Mixed martial arts record ==
Professional record breakdown
27 matches	13 wins	14 losses
By knockout	4	2
By submission	6	6
By decision	3	6

Res.	Record	Opponent	Method	Event	Date	Round	Time	Location	Notes
Loss	13–14	Hayato Sakurai	TKO (punches)	Rizin World Grand-Prix 2016: Final Round	December 31, 2016	2	12:37	Saitama, Japan	
Loss	13–13	Daniel Gracie	Submission (armbar)	Pride FC - Shockwave 2003	December 31, 2003	1	7:12	Saitama, Japan	
Loss	13–12	Mario Sperry	Decision (unanimous)	UFO - Legend	August 8, 2002	3	5:00	Tokyo, Japan	
Win	13–11	Toro Irison	Submission (armbar)	Deep - 4th Impact	March 30, 2002	1	4:05	Nagoya, Aichi, Japan	
Win	12–11	Kosei Kubota	TKO (punches)	Deep - 3rd Impact	December 23, 2001	1	4:05	Tokyo, Japan	
Win	11–11	Adrian Serrano	TKO (eye injury)	Deep - 2nd Impact	August 18, 2001	1	5:00	Yokohama, Kanagawa, Japan	
Loss	10–11	Ryushi Yanagisawa	Decision (split)	Rings: King of Kings 2000 Final	February 24, 2001	2	5:00	Tokyo, Japan	
Loss	10–10	Dave Menne	Decision (unanimous)	Rings: King of Kings 2000 Block A	October 9, 2000	2	5:00	Tokyo, Japan	
Loss	10–9	Gustavo Machado	TKO (cut)	Rings: Battle Genesis Vol. 6	September 5, 2000	1	1:35	Tokyo, Japan	
Win	10–8	Mansour Heidari	Decision (unanimous)	WEF 9 - World Class	May 13, 2000	3	4:00	Evansville, Indiana, United States	
Win	9–8	Branden Lee Hinkle	Submission (leg lock)	Rings: Millennium Combine 1	April 20, 2000	1	7:23	Tokyo, Japan	
Loss	8–8	Renzo Gracie	Submission (armbar)	Rings: King of Kings 1999 Block B	December 22, 1999	1	1:25	Osaka, Japan	
Win	8–7	Chris Watts	Submission (achilles lock)	TFKRG 5 - Total Fight KRG 5	October 3, 1999	1	6:53	Buckinghamshire, England, England	
Loss	7–7	Hiromitsu Kanehara	Decision (lost points)	Rings: Rise 5th	August 19, 1999	3	5:00	Japan	
Win	7–6	Borislav Jeliazkov	Submission (armbar)	Rings: Rise 4th	June 24, 1999	1	6:49	Japan	
Loss	6–6	Borislav Jeliazkov	Submission (scarf hold)	Rings: Rise 1st	March 20, 1999	1	8:28	Japan	
Loss	6–5	Sean Alvarez	Decision	Rings: Final Capture	February 21, 1999	3	5:00	Japan	
Win	6–4	Dick Vrij	TKO	Rings: World Mega Battle Tournament	December 23, 1998	1	2:29	Japan	
Win	5–4	Chris Haseman	TKO	Rings: Sixth Fighting Integration	September 21, 1998	1	12:21	Japan	
Win	4–4	Kenichi Yamamoto	Decision (unanimous)	Rings: Fifth Fighting Integration	August 28, 1998	1	20:00	Japan	
Win	3–4	Willie Peeters	Submission	Rings: Fourth Fighting Integration	June 27, 1998	1	1:45	Tokyo, Japan	
Loss	2–4	Willie Peeters	Decision (unanimous)	Rings Holland: The King of Rings	February 8, 1998	2	5:00	Amsterdam, Netherlands	
Win	2–3	Valentijn Overeem	Submission (ankle lock)	Rings - Extension Fighting 7	September 26, 1997	1	2:16	Japan	
Win	1–3	Sean McCully	Submission	Rings - Budokan Hall 1997	January 22, 1997	1	19:41	Tokyo, Japan	
Loss	0–3	Willie Peeters	Submission (neck lock)	Rings - Maelstrom 6	August 24, 1996	1	18:31	Japan	
Loss	0–2	Mikhail Ilyukhin	Submission	Rings - Budokan Hall 1996	January 24, 1996	N/A	N/A	Tokyo, Japan	
Loss	0–1	Tsuyoshi Kosaka	Submission	Rings - Budokan Hall 1995	January 25, 1995	N/A	N/A	Tokyo, Japan	
