= 1985 World Sambo Championships =

Sambo competitions

1983 World Sambo Championships
- Location: San Sebastián, Spain

The 1985 World Sambo Championships were held in San Sebastián, Spain, in September 1985. Championships were organized for first time by FIAS.

== Medal overview ==
men	Gold	Silver	Bronze
-48 kg	(Soviet Union) Aleksandr Ulyanin (URS)^{RUS}	(Bulgaria) Dimitar Dimitrov (BUL)	(Mongolia) Kh. Bayarsayman (MGL)
-52 kg	(Soviet Union) Sagid Meretukov (URS)^{RUS}	(Japan) Ya. Toru (JPN)	(Mongolia) Dunkhüügiin Tegshee (MGL)
-57 kg	(Soviet Union) Sergey Ternovykh (URS)^{GEO}	(Bulgaria) Georgi Yusev (BUL)	(Mongolia) Z. Batsukhid (MGL)
-62 kg	(Soviet Union) Aleksandr Aksenov (URS)^{RUS}	(Japan) S. Osamu (JPN)	(Spain) Fernando Blas (ESP)
-68 kg	(Soviet Union) Vladimir Panyshin (URS)^{RUS}	(Mongolia) Galdangiin Jamsran (MGL)	(Bulgaria) V. Tsochev (BUL)
-74 kg	(Soviet Union) Viktor Bukhval (URS)^{BLR}	(Japan) E. Fukai (JPN)	(Spain) Jon Idarreta (ESP)
-82 kg	(Soviet Union) Anatoly Yakovlev (URS)^{RUS}	(France) Didier Duru (FRA)	(Mongolia) Zunduyn Delgerdalay (MGL)
-90 kg	(Mongolia) Odvogiin Baljinnyam (MGL)	(Bulgaria) C. Gochev (BUL)	(Soviet Union) A. Glazunov (URS)^{UZB}
-100 kg	(Mongolia) Badmaanyambuugiin Bat-Erdene (MGL)	(France) A. Bazin (FRA)	(Soviet Union) Mikhail Kokorin (URS)^{RUS}
+100 kg	(Soviet Union) Vladimir Shkalov (URS)^{RUS}	(Bulgaria) N. Dinev (BUL)	(Mongolia) B. Khatbaatar (MGL)
