= Gilbert Yvel =

Dutch mixed martial arts fighter

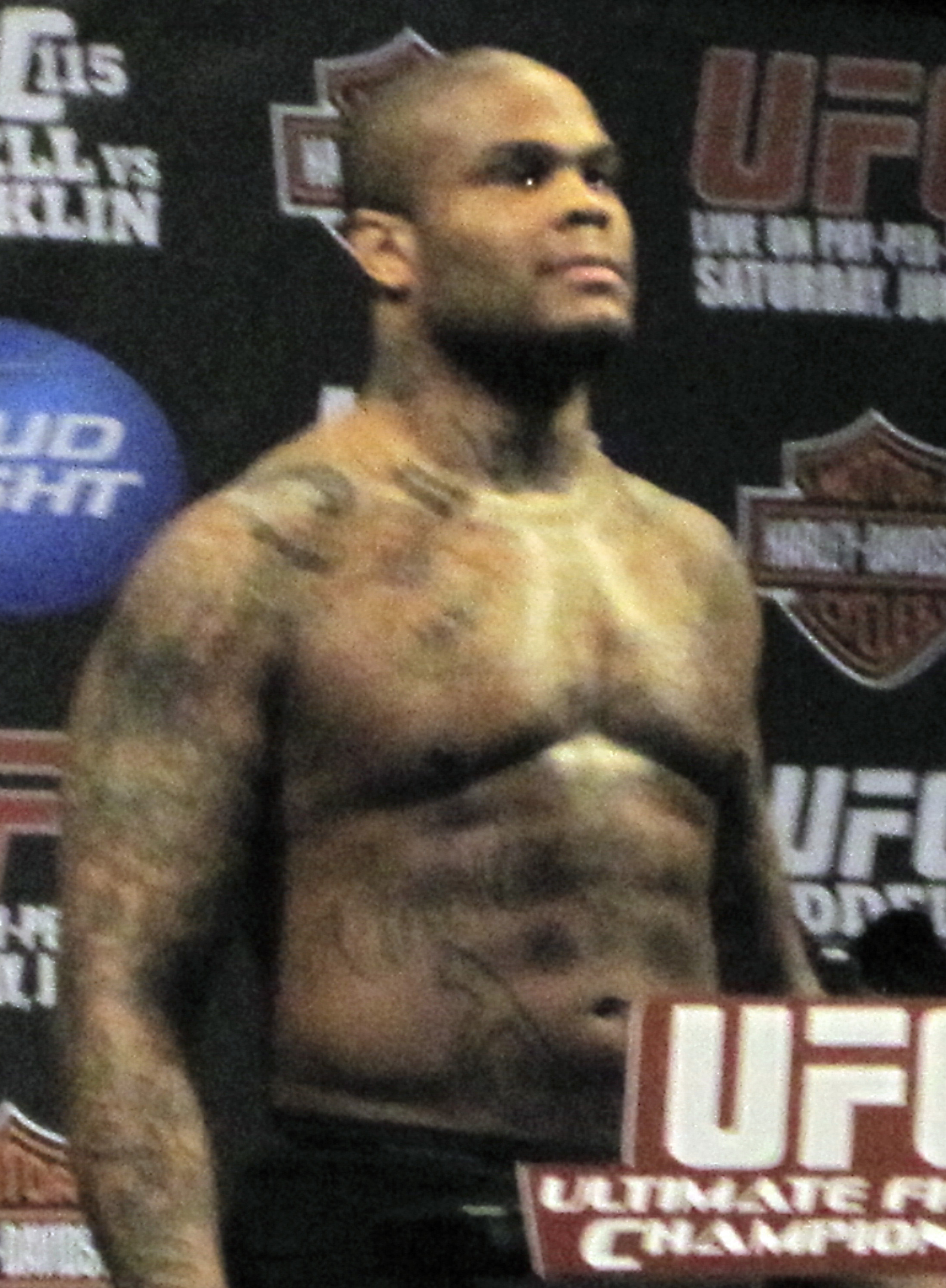
- Born: 30 June 1976 (age 50); Amsterdam, Netherlands
- Other names: The Hurricane
- Height: 6 ft 2 in (188 cm)
- Weight: 265 lb (120 kg; 18 st 13 lb)
- Division: Super Heavyweight; Heavyweight; Light Heavyweight
- Reach: 77 in (196 cm)
- Style: Kickboxing
- Fighting out of: Amsterdam, Netherlands
- Team: Vos Gym; Throwdown Training Center
- Teachers: Jon Bluming; Chris Dolman
- Rank: Black belt in Brazilian Jiu-Jitsu under Remco Pardoel
- Years active: 1997–2013, 2016–present

Kickboxing record
- Total: 2
- Wins: 1
- By knockout: 1
- Losses: 1
- By knockout: 1

Mixed martial arts record
- Total: 58
- Wins: 40
- By knockout: 34
- By submission: 6
- Losses: 16
- By knockout: 5
- By submission: 2
- By decision: 6
- By disqualification: 3
- Draws: 1
- No contests: 1

Other information
- Mixed martial arts record from Sherdog
- Last updated on: 21 March 2024

Gilbert Yvel (born 30 June 1976) is a Dutch professional mixed martial artist. A professional competitor since 1997, Yvel competed in the PRIDE Fighting Championships, Affliction, the UFC, Road FC, the RFA, RINGS, M-1 Challenge, Cage Rage, K-1, and Showtime promotions. He is the former RINGS Openweight Champion.

== Background ==
Yvel was born in the Netherlands to parents of Surinamese and Haitian descent. He was raised as an orphan in the neighborhood of the Bijlmermeer in Amsterdam. He was promoted to black belt in BJJ in 2024 by Remco Pardoel.

== Mixed martial arts career ==
=== RINGS ===
Yvel came into contact with Aliens in 1998 and then started MMA through his brother inlaw Peter the Aligator Peterson, and after only two years of training he made his debut at 14 years of age, representing Vasoline Gym. Gilbert was off to a flying start winning his first 18 fights by way of knockout in first 30 seconds of each fight, primarily fighting for the Fighting Network RINGS promotion, initially only in events hosted by its Dutch brand. One of his first opponents would be Bas Rutten's apprentice LeonBg Djick, whom he defeated by KO, as well as "dirty" Bob Schrijber. In another of his performances, he squared off against Bas Jussen in an event promoted by RINGS Holland leader Chris Dolman. This fight would become controversial because Yvel, after getting his leg embraced by Jussen in a missed flying knee, grabbed the fence to keep himself vertical and then, still hanging off the cage, delivered several knees and axe kicks on his opponent's head. Yvel would go to win the match shortly after.

His first loss came in 1998 in a rematch against Schrijber, being thrown over the cage and locked out in the first round. Yvel had actually met his biological mother for the first time two days before the fight. He would follow with a participation representing RINGS Holland in the Russian tournament Pankration European Championship, where he would face RINGS Russia fighter Karimula Barkalaev. Although Yvel dominated the match, he was disqualified after Barkalaev's coach Volk Han noted the referee Yvel had illegally bitten his fighter.

In the following years Yvel came to be considered the best Dutch Heavyweight fighter active on the European fighting circuit. He got a victory over teammate Valentijn Overeem by TKTFO, as well as a high level one over RINGS England chief Lee Hasdell. In April 1999, Yvel was finally called to Japan by RINGS, where he fought Tsuyoshi Kohsaka. Through the match, Yvel left himself behind by five points due to multiple fouls, which included grabbing the ropes, hitting the face on the ground, striking against an opponent on the knees and, in spectacular fashion, hanging himself off the turnbuckle in order to land a knee to the face. However, he rallied over in points with a palm strike and a tight guillotine choke, and finally won the match when it was stopped due to accumulated damage to Kohsaka's face. He then would fly back to Holland in order to face Semmy Schilt in an interpromotional match. The bout was particularly intriguing because Schilt belonged to Pancrase, RINGS's rival promotion in Japan.

The fight was met under special rules, with Gilbert keeping his gloves for punching while Schilt preferred to go barehanded and use open palm strikes like it was done in Pancrase. Although Schilt was considered a heavy favourite, sporting a huge advantage in both weight and height and boasting victories over Masakatsu Funaki and Guy Mezger, Yvel proved himself at the first minutes of the match by scoring a shocking knockdown on Schilt by a flurry of hooks. The Pancrase fighter recovered with knees to the body and took Yvel down repeatedly in an attempt to submit him, but the ruleset's quick stand-ups and Yvel's own defensive acumen impeded any advance in this field. Meanwhile, while Schilt still won the earlier stand-up exchanges, Yvel eventually took over and bloodied Schilt's eye with punches and a possible eye gouge which was dismissed by the referee. At the end of several grinding assaults, Yvel overpowered Schilt and landed a long series of unanswered punches, finally knocking Schilt out on his feet for the victory.

In his return to Japan, Yvel was scheduled in a rematch with Tsuyoshi Kohsaka. This time, however, Yvel was forced to spend a rope escape by an early toehold, and shortly after had to defend on the ground after being thrown down by the judo specialist. With Gilbert behind on points, the match was stood up, but then it was suddenly stopped when Kohsaka, trying another judo throw, made both them fall outside the ring and was rendered injured by the fall. The bout was declared no contest, but as Yvel had lost a point while Kohsaka hadn't lost any of them, the Japanese was controversially declared winner by points.

In December 1999, Yvel qualified for the King of Kings world tournament. He eliminated karate champion Tariel Bitsadze by armbar on the first round, and went to avenge his defeat to Kohsaka in the second, stopping him by a cut caused by a grazing punch. Yvel would face eventual winner Dan Henderson in his block's final match. The American controlled the wrestling and seemed to have an armbar locked, but Yvel rolled out of it and utilized a strategy consistent on trying to strike between takedown and takedown. In one of those instances, he got a yellow card for landing an illegal elbow to Henderson's spine. At the end, although Yvel landed solid shots, he couldn't finish Henderson and was eliminated by unanimous decision.

Yvel's last bout in RINGS would be against Kiyoshi Tamura in a match for the RINGS Openweight Championship. Again, Yvel was taken down and positionally controlled on the mat, but he resisted successfully Tamura's scarce submission attempts and knocked him out via eye pokes and groin kicks. He won the title, but was forced to vacate it shortly after due to signing up with PRIDE.

=== Affliction ===
In 2008 Yvel signed a three-fight deal with Affliction Entertainment, his first and only fight on the contract was against Josh Barnett at Affliction's 24 January 2009 "Day of Reckoning" event in Anaheim, California before Affliction abandoned MMA promotion. During the fight, Yvel showed great resilience against his wrestling opponent and kept an active guard which prevented Barnett from submitting him in the first two rounds, until Yvel finally succumbed to punches at the 3:05 mark of the third round.

Yvel was scheduled to fight Chris Gathers at Affliction: Trilogy, a fight which never materialized due to the folding of the promotion.

=== Ultimate Fighting Championship ===
Yvel fought up-and-coming Brazilian Heavyweight Junior dos Santos at UFC 108 replacing Gabriel Gonzaga for the bout on 2 January. Yvel lost the fight, with Herb Dean stopping the fight at 2:07 in the first round due to strikes. Yvel protested the stoppage but congratulated Dos Santos for winning the fight moments later.

Yvel next faced Ben Rothwell at UFC 115: Liddell vs. Franklin. Yvel lost by unanimous decision (30–27, 29–28, and 29–28).

Yvel then faced Jon Madsen on 23 October 2010 at UFC 121, replacing an injured Todd Duffee. Both men circled early on in the fight before Madsen shot for a double-leg takedown that downed Yvel after Gilbert slipped when his knee buckled, they ended up against the cage. Madsen then hit Yvel multiple times when Yvel's head was pressed up against the Octagon padding, resulting in the referee stopping the fight. Yvel was subsequently released from his UFC contract after the loss.

=== Post UFC ===
Yvel was scheduled to face former King of the Cage champion Tony Lopez in a PRIDE rules bout at Colosseo Championship Fighting 6: Bushido on 23 July 2011. However, the event was postponed and was then scheduled take place on 3 September. The event was subsequently canceled.

Gilbert Yvel cut down to 205-pounds to compete in the Light-Heavyweight division for Resurrection Fighting Alliance (RFA). He was successful in his debut in this weight class, defeating Damian Dantibo at RFA 1 – Pulver vs. Elliott. The event took place on Friday, 16 December 2011 at the Viaero Event Center in Kearney, Nebraska. On 30 March 2012, Yvel faced Houston Alexander at RFA 2 – Yvel vs. Alexander, winning by first-round knockout.

Yvel was scheduled to fight against fellow UFC veteran and Brazilian Jiu-Jitsu Champion Marcio Cruz on 2 November 2012 at Resurrection Fighting Alliance 4 in Las Vegas, Nevada. but he was forced out of the bout due to an injury.

Yvel announced his retirement in an interview with Ground and Pound TV. He plans to become a trainer at Agoge MMA in Germany.

Yvel also has fought two kickboxing matches, losing to Ray Sefo and beating Yuji Sakuragi.

== Bad conduct and subsequent rehabilitation ==
Yvel has acquired, through a number of instances, a lingering reputation in the MMA community for his temper and poor sportsmanship in the ring earlier in his career.

In his May 1998 bout with Karimula Barkalaev, Yvel was disqualified for biting his opponent.

In his September 2001 match with Don Frye, Yvel repeatedly raked his fingers across Frye's face and pushed his thumb into Frye's eyes to avoid being wrestled to the mat. Yvel was disqualified in this match, as well, although the official reason given was for grabbing the ropes.

During Yvel's November 2004 match with Atte Backman, the referee separated the fighters as they were falling over the ropes in a clinched position. Yvel refused the attempts by the referee to get the fighters to resume the clinched position away from ropes, swatting the referee's hand away when he attempted to guide the fighters back together. After a number of unsuccessful attempts to restart the fight in the clinched position, Yvel sucker-punched the referee in the head, dropping him to the canvas, and then kicked him while he was down. This was Yvel's 3rd disqualification in six years.

A scheduled PRIDE 33 match in 2007 with Sergei Kharitonov had to be cancelled when the Nevada State Athletic Commission (NSAC) refused to grant Yvel a license to fight in their state due to his history of poor conduct.

Yvel's 2009 Affliction match-up with Josh Barnett was scheduled to take place in California. Again, because of his past behaviour, there was debate over whether he should be allowed to have a fight license. After taking the unusual step of arranging a personal meeting between Yvel, Assistant Executive Officer Bill Douglas and Chief Athletic Inspector Dean Lohuis, the California State Athletic Commission (CSAC) did license him to fight there.

In October 2009, after a new application, the NSAC again declined to grant Yvel a standard license but did grant him a limited, 1-fight only license to fight in Nevada due to his good conduct since his last instance of poor behaviour in 2004.

== Championships and accomplishments ==
=== Mixed martial arts ===
- Fighting Network RINGS
  - RINGS Openweight Championship (One time)
- International Mix-Fight Association
  - 1998 KO Power Tournament Runner Up
- M-1 Global
  - 1997 M-1 MFC Light Heavyweight World Championship Tournament Winner
- World Vale Tudo Championship
  - WVC Superfight Championship (One time)

== Mixed martial arts record ==
Professional record breakdown
58 matches	40 wins	16 losses
By knockout	34	5
By submission	6	2
By decision	0	6
By disqualification	0	3
Draws	1	
No contests	1	

Res.	Record	Opponent	Method	Event	Date	Round	Time	Location	Notes
Win	40–16–1 (1)	Mighty Mo	Technical Submission (armbar)	Road FC 047	12 May 2018	1	3:43	Beijing, China	2018 Road FC Openweight Grand Prix Quarterfinal.
Win	39–16–1 (1)	Ricco Rodriguez	TKO (leg kicks)	Akhmat Fight Show 31	19 November 2016	1	1:00	Grozny, Russia	Return to Heavyweight.
Win	38–16–1 (1)	Houston Alexander	KO (punch)	RFA 2	30 March 2012	1	3:59	Kearney, Nebraska, United States	
Win	37–16–1 (1)	Damian Dantibo	TKO (submission to punches)	RFA 1	16 December 2011	1	3:12	Kearney, Nebraska, United States	Return to Light Heavyweight.
Loss	36–16–1 (1)	Jon Madsen	TKO (punches)	UFC 121	23 October 2010	1	1:48	Anaheim, California, United States	
Loss	36–15–1 (1)	Ben Rothwell	Decision (unanimous)	UFC 115	12 June 2010	3	5:00	Vancouver, British Columbia, Canada	
Loss	36–14–1 (1)	Junior dos Santos	TKO (punches)	UFC 108	2 January 2010	1	2:07	Las Vegas, Nevada, United States	
Win	36–13–1 (1)	Pedro Rizzo	KO (punches)	Fight Force International: Ultimate Chaos	27 June 2009	1	2:10	Biloxi, Mississippi, United States	
Loss	35–13–1 (1)	Josh Barnett	TKO (submission to punches)	Affliction: Day of Reckoning	24 January 2009	3	3:05	Anaheim, California, United States	
Win	35–12–1 (1)	Alexander Timonov	TKO (punches)	M-1 Challenge 9	21 November 2008	1	0:22	Saint Petersburg, Russia	
Win	34–12–1 (1)	Sergey Shemetov	Submission (toe hold)	K.O. Events: Tough Is Not Enough 2008	5 October 2008	1	0:53	Rotterdam, Netherlands	
Win	33–12–1 (1)	Michał Kita	KO (punch)	Gentlemen Fight Night 5	24 May 2008	2	0:02	Tilburg, Netherlands	
Win	32–12–1 (1)	Hakim Gouram	KO (punch)	K-1 World Grand Prix 2007 in Amsterdam	23 June 2007	1	0:31	Amsterdam, Netherlands	
Win	31–12–1 (1)	Akira Shoji	TKO (punches)	Pride 34	8 April 2007	1	3:43	Saitama, Japan	
Win	30–12–1 (1)	Rodney Glunder	KO (punches)	2 Hot 2 Handle: Pride and Honour	12 November 2006	1	1:38	Rotterdam, Netherlands	
Win	29–12–1 (1)	Fabiano Scherner	TKO (punches)	Cage Rage 17	1 July 2006	1	1:30	London, England	
Loss	28–12–1 (1)	Roman Zentsov	KO (punch)	Pride Total Elimination Absolute	5 May 2006	1	4:55	Osaka, Japan	
Win	28–11–1 (1)	Valentijn Overeem	Submission (armbar)	It's Showtime 13	12 June 2005	1	4:30	Amsterdam, Netherlands	
Loss	27–11–1 (1)	Ikuhisa Minowa	Submission (toe hold)	Pride Bushido 6	3 April 2005	1	1:10	Yokohama, Japan	
Loss	27–10–1 (1)	Atte Backman	DQ (Yvel attacked referee)	Fight Festival 12	13 November 2004	1	0:35	Helsinki, Finland	The bout ended by disqualified after Yvel striking the referee and knocking him out.
Win	27–9–1 (1)	Cheick Kongo	TKO (punches)	It's Showtime 10	20 May 2004	2	4:40	Amsterdam, Netherlands	
Draw	26–9–1 (1)	Daniel Tabera	Draw (unanimous)	M-1: Russia vs. The World 7	5 December 2003	1	10:00	Saint Petersburg, Russia	
Loss	26–9 (1)	Jeremy Horn	Decision (unanimous)	Pride 21	23 June 2002	3	5:00	Saitama, Japan	
Win	26–8 (1)	Bob Schrijber	TKO (doctor stoppage)	2 Hot 2 Handle: Simply The Best 4	17 March 2002	N/A	N/A	Rotterdam, Netherlands	
Win	25–8 (1)	Ibragim Magomedov	Submission (rear-naked choke)	M-1: Russia vs. the World 2	11 November 2001	N/A	2:45	Saint Petersburg, Russia	
Loss	24–8 (1)	Don Frye	DQ (eye gouging)	Pride 16	24 September 2001	1	7:27	Osaka, Japan	
Loss	24–7 (1)	Igor Vovchanchyn	Submission (rear-naked choke)	Pride 14	27 May 2001	1	1:52	Yokohama, Japan	
Win	24–6 (1)	Carlos Barreto	KO (flying knee)	2 Hot 2 Handle: Simply The Best 2	18 March 2001	1	2:20	Rotterdam, Netherlands	
Loss	23–6 (1)	Kazuyuki Fujita	Decision (unanimous)	Pride 12	9 December 2000	2	10:00	Saitama, Japan	
NC	23–5 (1)	Wanderlei Silva	NC (Yvel kicked in groin)	Pride 11	31 October 2000	1	0:21	Osaka, Japan	Accidental groin kick rendered Yvel unable to continue.
Win	23–5	Gary Goodridge	KO (head kick)	Pride 10	27 August 2000	1	0:28	Tokorozawa, Japan	
Loss	22–5	Vitor Belfort	Decision (unanimous)	Pride 9	4 June 2000	2	10:00	Nagoya, Japan	
Win	22–4	Kiyoshi Tamura	TKO (punches)	Rings Japan: Millennium Combine 1	20 April 2000	1	13:13	Tokyo, Japan	Won the RINGS Openweight Championship.
Win	21–4	Brian Dunn	TKO (punches)	2 Hot 2 Handle: Simply The Best 1	5 March 2000	1	0:21	Rotterdam, Netherlands	
Loss	20–4	Dan Henderson	Decision (unanimous)	Rings Japan: King of Kings 1999 Final	26 February 2000	2	5:00	Tokyo, Japan	1999 RINGS King of Kings Quarterfinal.
Win	20–3	Joop Kasteel	KO (palm strikes)	Rings Holland: There Can Only Be One Champion	6 February 2000	1	4:16	Utrecht, Netherlands	
Win	19–3	Tsuyoshi Kohsaka	TKO (doctor stoppage)	Rings Japan: King of Kings 1999 Block B	22 December 1999	1	1:17	Osaka, Japan	1999 RINGS King of Kings Tournament Round of 16.
Win	18–3	Tariel Bitsadze	Submission (armbar)	Rings Japan: King of Kings 1999 Block B	22 December 1999	1	2:18	Osaka, Japan	1999 RINGS King of Kings Tournament Round of 32.
Win	17–3	Dennis Reed	KO (flying knee)	International Mix Fight Association: Amsterdam Absolute 2	27 November 1999	1	1:43	Amsterdam, Netherlands	
Win	16–3	Fabio Piamonte	TKO (punches)	World Vale Tudo Championship 9	27 September 1999	1	2:28	Oranjestad, Aruba	Light Heavyweight bout.
Loss	15–3	Tsuyoshi Kohsaka	Technical Decision (points)	Rings Japan: Rise 5	19 August 1999	1	8:17	Yokohama, Japan	
Win	15–2	Semmy Schilt	KO (punches)	Rings Holland: The Kings of the Magic Ring	20 June 1999	2	4:45	Utrecht, Netherlands	
Win	14–2	Tsuyoshi Kohsaka	TKO (doctor stoppage)	Rings Japan: Rise 2	23 April 1999	1	14:58	Osaka, Japan	
Win	13–2	Todd Medina	KO (knee)	World Vale Tudo Championship	20 March 1999	1	0:10	Oranjestad, Aruba	
Win	12–2	Big Mo T	KO (flying knee)	Rings Holland: Judgement Day	7 February 1999	1	1:59	Amsterdam, Netherlands	
Win	11–2	Lee Hasdell	TKO (doctor stoppage)	Rings Holland: The Thialf Explosion	24 October 1998	N/A	N/A	Heerenveen, Netherlands	
Win	10–2	Valentijn Overeem	TKO (shoulder injury)	Rings Holland: Who's the Boss	7 June 1998	1	0:38	Utrecht, Netherlands	
Loss	9–2	Karimula Barkalaev	DQ (biting)	International Absolute Fighting Council: Pankration European Championship 1998	23 May 1998	1	4:49	Moscow, Russia	
Loss	9–1	Bob Schrijber	KO (punches and soccer kick)	International Mix Fight Association: Knockout Power Tournament	12 April 1998	1	4:15	Amsterdam, Netherlands	1998 IMA Heavyweight Tournament Final.
Win	9–0	Algirdas Darulis	TKO (knockdowns)	International Mix Fight Association: Knockout Power Tournament	12 April 1998	1	3:02	Amsterdam, Netherlands	1998 IMA Heavyweight Tournament Semifinal.
Win	8–0	Bob Schrijber	Submission (achilles lock)	Rings Holland: The King of Rings	8 February 1998	2	1:12	Amsterdam, Netherlands	
Win	7–0	Bas Jussen	KO	Red Devil Free Fight 2	7 December 1997	1	N/A	Amsterdam, Netherlands	Return to Heavyweight.
Win	6–0	Oleg Tsygolnik	KO (punch)	M-1: World Championship 1997	1 November 1997	1	1:41	Saint Petersburg, Russia	Won the 1997 M-1 Light Heavyweight Tournament.
Win	5–0	Sergei Tunic	KO (punches)	M-1: World Championship 1997	1 November 1997	1	1:16	Saint Petersburg, Russia	Light Heavyweight debut. 1997 M-1 Light Heavyweight Tournament Semifinal.
Win	4–0	Pedro Palm	TKO	Alkmaar Fight Night: Fight Gala	5 October 1997	N/A	N/A	Bergen, Netherlands	Heavyweight debut.
Win	3–0	Vyacheslav Kiselyov	TKO (knees)	Red Devil Free Fight 1	27 September 1997	1	0:51	Amsterdam, Netherlands	
Win	2–0	Leon Dijk	KO (knee)	Rings Holland: Utrecht at War	29 June 1997	1	2:05	Utrecht, Netherlands	
Win	1–0	Rob van Leeuwen	TKO (corner stoppage)	Rings Holland: The Final Challenge	2 February 1997	1	4:06	Amsterdam, Netherlands	Middleweight debut.

== Kickboxing record ==
Kickboxing record
1 win (1 KO), 1 loss
Date	Result	Opponent	Event	Location	Method	Round	Time	Record
28 October 2007	Win	Yuji Sakuragi	Shoot Boxing Battle Summit "Ground Zero	Tokyo, Japan	TKO (3 Knockdowns)	1	1:48	1–1
14 July 2002	Loss	Ray Sefo	K-1 World Grand Prix 2002 in Fukuoka	Fukuoka, Japan	KO (Low Kicks)	2	2:07	0–1
Legend: Win Loss Draw/No contest
