= Valentijn Overeem =

Dutch kickboxer and mixed martial arts fighter

- Born: 17 August 1976 (age 50); Amersfoort, Netherlands
- Other names: The Python
- Height: 6 ft 3 in (191 cm)
- Weight: 234 lb (106 kg; 16 st 10 lb)
- Division: Heavyweight
- Reach: 76 in (193 cm)
- Style: Kickboxing, Sambo
- Fighting out of: Amsterdam, Netherlands
- Team: Golden Glory; Jaco Hybrid Training Center; Xtreme Couture
- Teachers: Chris Dolman; Lucien Carbin
- Years active: 1996–2014

Kickboxing record
- Total: 2
- Losses: 1
- By knockout: 1
- No contests: 1

Mixed martial arts record
- Total: 62
- Wins: 30
- By knockout: 12
- By submission: 17
- By decision: 1
- Losses: 32
- By knockout: 18
- By submission: 13
- By decision: 1

Other information
- Notable relatives: Alistair Overeem (brother)
- Mixed martial arts record from Sherdog
- Last updated on: 7 September 2024

Valentijn Overeem (Dutch pronunciation: [ˈvaːləntɛin ˈoːvəreːm]; born 17 August 1976) is a Dutch retired professional mixed martial artist and kickboxer. A professional competitor since 1996, he has previously fought for the PRIDE Fighting Championships, RINGS, KSW, the World Fighting Alliance, K-1, M-1 Global, Its Showtime, World Victory Road, and Strikeforce. He is the older brother of fellow MMA Superstar Alistair Overeem. Overeem has notable wins over fighters such as Randy Couture and Renato Sobral.

== Biography ==
Overeem was born in Amersfoort, Utrecht and is associated with the Imperial Athletics gym in Boca Raton, Florida where he trains with his younger brother Alistair. Along with his younger brother, Valentijn spent part of his childhood in England, which is where his brother was born.

=== RINGS ===
Valentijn was trained at the Chris Dolman gym, where he specialized in kickboxing and sambo before debuting at the Japanese professional wrestling promotion Fighting Network RINGS.

In 1999, Overeem participated in the RINGS King of Kings tournament, but he was submitted and eliminated by Antônio Rodrigo Nogueira at the first round.

He would perform better at the next edition of the tournament, advancing on the first round after eliminating sambo champion Suren Balachinskiy. Overeem earned a yellow card for holding the ropes to avoid a takedown at one point, but he made up by outstriking Suren and focusing on kicking his injured leg, finishing the match by knee strikes.

Valentijn then advanced further against famed luta livre practitioner Renato Sobral in an upset. Overeem was the superior striker, prompting Sobral to take him down. Overeem looked for a Kimura lock, the Brazilian reversed it into an armbar creating an exchange that ended with Overeem taking by accident an illegal punch to the jaw that almost knocked him out. As Overeem seemed unable to continue, both judges and the referee proposed to stop the match, but Valentijn's corner insisted on continuing. Returning to the fight, Overeem managed to compose himself and take down Babalu by kosoto gake, which the lutador countered by threatening with another armbar from the bottom. This time, however, Overeem captured a leg and quickly transitioned into a toehold, making Sobral tap out.

After eliminating Yoshihisa Yamamoto by armbar in under one minute, Overeem continued advancing, and got another upset by choking out Randy Couture in a failed takedown. The final match of the tournament was against Antônio Rodrigo Nogueira, with Overeem submitted once again in the first round.

=== Strikeforce ===
On 9 June 2010, Overeem signed to fight under the Strikeforce banner. He was scheduled to fight Antônio Silva on 4 December 2010, but suffered an injury that caused him to withdraw from the fight. He eventually made his promotional debut against Ray Sefo at Strikeforce: Fedor vs. Silva on 12 February 2011 where he won in the first round by using a neck crank.

Overeem then returned against Chad Griggs at Strikeforce: Overeem vs. Werdum on 18 June 2011, in Dallas, Texas. Overeem lost as he tapped out due to punches.

On 3 August 2011, Golden Glory announced that Overeem had been released from his contract by Strikeforce.

=== Post-Strikeforce ===
On 25 February, Overeem won his fight against Polish kickboxer and mixed martial artist Marcin Różalski at KSW 18 in Płock, Poland. He replaced injured Jérôme Le Banner and took the fight on 2 days notice. Overeem won by submission (toe hold) in the first round.

Overeem fought in a kickboxing match on 23 February 2013 after 16 years of inactivity as a professional kickboxer where he faced James Wilson, a former professional boxer turned kickboxer. The fight was held in Miami on the debut event of S-1 Challenge, it ended in a No Contest decision due to an unsafe ring as both fighters fell over the ropes with Wilson falling twice.

On 7 December 2013, Overeem fought Mikhail Mokhnatkin at Fight Nights: Battle of Moscow 14. Overeem lost via KO in the first round.

Overeem faced Konstantin Gluhov in a rematch on 12 April 2014 at PFC 6: Pancrase Fighting Championship 6. Overeem lost by first-round KO.

Overeem would then lose his next bout against Ante Delija via TKO at HOG: House of Gladiators 9 in round one.

In 2013, Overeem featured in the video clip Street Credibility by the Belgian rapper CHG Unfadable.

== Championships and accomplishments ==
- Fighting Network RINGS
  - RINGS King of Kings 2000 Tournament Runner Up
  - RINGS Free Fight Dutch Heavyweight Champion
- Durata World Grand Prix
  - Durata World Grand Prix 2003 Tournament Champion

== Mixed martial arts record ==
Professional record breakdown
66 matches	32 wins	34 losses
By knockout	13	19
By submission	18	14
By decision	1	1

Res.	Record	Opponent	Method	Event	Date	Round	Time	Location	Notes
Loss	32–34	Ante Delija	TKO (punches)	HOG: House of Gladiators 9	3 July 2014	1	1:24	Dubrovnik, Croatia	
Loss	32–33	Konstantin Gluhov	KO (punch)	PFC 6: Pancrase Fighting Championship 6	12 April 2014	1	2:33	Marseille, France	For the PFC Heavyweight Championship.
Loss	32–32	Mikhail Mokhnatkin	TKO (submission to strikes)	Fight Nights: Battle of Moscow 14	7 December 2013	1	4:45	Moscow, Russia	
Loss	32–31	Konstantin Gluhov	KO (knee)	PFC 5: Clash of the Titans	27 April 2013	1	2:48	Marseille, France	For the PFC Heavyweight Championship.
Loss	32–30	Michael Knaap	TKO (punches)	Beast of the East	14 April 2013	1	3:03	Zutphen, Netherlands	
Loss	32–29	Evgeny Erokhin	TKO (submission to punches)	Pankration: Battle of Empires 2	15 December 2012	1	4:43	Khabarovsk, Russia	
Loss	32–28	Michał Kita	Submission (guillotine choke)	Oktagon Italy	24 March 2012	1	4:03	Assago, Italy	
Win	32–27	Marcin Rózalski	Submission (heel hook)	KSW 18	25 February 2012	1	2:24	Płock, Poland	
Loss	31–27	Chad Griggs	TKO (submission to punches)	Strikeforce: Overeem vs. Werdum	18 June 2011	1	2:55	Dallas, United States	Strikeforce Heavyweight Grand Prix Reserve bout.
Win	31–26	Ray Sefo	Submission (neck crank)	Strikeforce: Fedor vs. Silva	12 February 2011	1	1:37	East Rutherford, New Jersey, United States	Strikeforce Heavyweight Grand Prix Reserve bout.
Win	30–26	Catalin Zmarandescu	KO (knee)	K-1 World Grand Prix 2010 in Bucharest	21 May 2010	1	0:50	Bucharest, Romania	
Win	29–26	Tengiz Tedoradze	KO (head kick)	Pancrase Fighting Championship 2	17 April 2010	1	0:06	Marseille, France	
Loss	28–26	Rafal Dabrowski	TKO (submission to punches)	Beast of the East	14 November 2009	1	1:17	Gdynia, Poland	
Loss	28–25	Nikolai Onikienko	TKO (doctor stoppage)	Ultimate Glory 11: A Decade of Fights	17 October 2009	1	0:47	Amsterdam, Netherlands	
Win	28–24	Kazuo Takahashi	KO (flying knee)	World Victory Road Presents: Sengoku 4	24 August 2008	1	2:42	Japan	
Win	27–24	Sasa Lazic	Submission (kimura)	LOTR: Schilt vs. Guelmino	12 January 2008	1	0:33	Serbia	
Loss	26–24	Milco Voorn	Submission (choke)	King of the Ring	25 March 2006	1	0:45	Netherlands	
Loss	26–23	Gilbert Yvel	Submission (armbar)	It's Showtime Boxing & MMA Event 2005 Amsterdam	12 June 2005	1	4:30	Amsterdam, Netherlands	
Loss	26–22	Shungo Oyama	Submission (toe hold)	HERO'S 1	26 March 2005	1	1:28	Saitama, Japan	
Loss	26–21	Kresimir Bogdanovic	TKO (injury)	Ultimate Nokaut 1	11 March 2005	1	N/A	Croatia	
Win	26–20	Ross Pointon	TKO (elbows)	Anarchy Fight Night	20 February 2005	1	0:59	England	
Loss	25–20	Dave Dalgliesh	KO (punches)	2 Hot 2 Handle	10 October 2004	2	N/A	Netherlands	
Win	25–19	Autimio Antonia	KO (punches)	CFC 1: Cage Carnage	11 July 2004	1	0:57	Essex, England	
Win	24–19	Roman Savochka	Submission (guillotine choke)	Durata World Grand Prix 3	12 December 2003	1	0:31	Croatia	
Win	23–19	Milco Voorn	Submission (side choke)	Durata World Grand Prix 3	12 December 2003	1	1:21	Croatia	
Win	22–19	Andrei Rudakov	Submission (arm lock)	Durata World Grand Prix 3	12 December 2003	1	0:21	Croatia	
Loss	21–19	Dave Vader	KO (punch)	It's Showtime 2003 Amsterdam	8 June 2003	1	3:22	Amsterdam, Netherlands	
Loss	21–18	Mikko Rupponen	Decision (split)	Fight Festival 7	19 May 2003	1	15:00	Finland	
Loss	21–17	Ibragim Magomedov	TKO (punches)	M-1 MFC: Russia vs. the World 5	6 April 2003	1	3:20	Saint Petersburg, Russia	
Loss	21–16	Ron Waterman	Submission (keylock)	PRIDE 24	23 December 2002	1	2:18	Japan	
Loss	21–15	Rodney Glunder	TKO (retirement)	2H2H 5: Simply the Best 5	13 October 2002	1	3:00	Amsterdam, Netherlands	
Loss	21–14	Aaron Brink	TKO (punches)	WFA 2: Level 2	5 July 2002	1	2:24	Nevada, United States	
Win	21–13	Marc Emmanuel	TKO (leg kicks)	2H2H 4: Simply the Best 4	17 March 2002	1	1:12	Netherlands	
Loss	20–13	Igor Vovchanchyn	Submission (heel hook)	PRIDE 18	23 December 2001	1	4:35	Fukuoka Prefecture, Japan	
Loss	20–12	Assuério Silva	Submission (heel hook)	PRIDE 15	29 July 2001	1	2:50	Saitama, Japan	
Loss	20–11	Gary Goodridge	TKO (submission to punches)	PRIDE 14: Clash of the Titans	27 May 2001	1	2:39	Yokohama, Japan	
Win	20–10	Ian Freeman	TKO (doctor stoppage)	2H2H 2: Simply The Best	18 March 2001	1	1:42	Netherlands	
Loss	19–10	Antônio Rodrigo Nogueira	Submission (arm-triangle choke)	RINGS: King of Kings 2000 Final	24 February 2001	1	1:20	Tokyo, Japan	
Win	19–9	Randy Couture	Submission (guillotine choke)	RINGS: King of Kings 2000 Final	24 February 2001	1	0:56	Tokyo, Japan	
Win	18–9	Yoshihisa Yamamoto	Submission (armbar)	RINGS: King of Kings 2000 Final	24 February 2001	1	0:45	Tokyo, Japan	
Win	17–9	Jerrel Venetiaan	Submission (heel hook)	It's Showtime: Christmas Edition	12 December 2000	1	1:27	Haarlem, Netherlands	
Win	16–9	Suren Balachinskiy	TKO (strikes)	RINGS: King of Kings 2000 Block A	9 October 2000	1	2:13	Tokyo, Japan	
Win	15–9	Renato Sobral	Submission (toe hold)	RINGS: King of Kings 2000 Block A	9 October 2000	1	2:19	Tokyo, Japan	
Win	14–9	Joe Slick	Submission (achilles lock)	RINGS: Millennium Combine 3	23 August 2000	1	0:36	Osaka, Japan	
Win	13–9	Tuli Kulihaapai	Technical Submission (armbar)	RINGS USA: Rising Stars Block B	22 July 2000	1	2:05	Hawaii, United States	
Loss	12–9	Tommy Sauer	KO (punches)	RINGS USA: Rising Stars Block B	22 July 2000	1	0:35	Hawaii, United States	
Win	12–8	Brad Kohler	Submission (kneebar)	RINGS: Millennium Combine 2	15 June 2000	1	0:31	Tokyo, Japan	
Win	11–8	Fatih Kocamis	KO (punch)	RINGS Holland: Di Capo Di Tutti Capi	4 June 2000	2	0:47	Netherlands	
Loss	10–8	Achmed Labasanov	Submission (achilles lock)	RINGS Russia: Russia vs. The World	20 May 2000	1	3:50	Yekaterinburg, Russia	
Win	10–7	Dennis Reed	Technical Submission (guillotine choke)	2 Hot 2 Handle 1	5 March 2000	1	0:28	Netherlands	
Loss	9–7	Hiromitsu Kanehara	KO (punch)	RINGS Holland: There Can Only Be One Champion	6 February 2000	1	4:14	Netherlands	
Loss	9–6	Antônio Rodrigo Nogueira	Technical Submission (keylock)	RINGS: King of Kings 1999 Block A	28 October 1999	1	1:51	Tokyo, Japan	
Win	9–5	Hiromitsu Kanehara	TKO (corner stoppage)	RINGS: Rise 3rd	22 May 1999	1	4:35	Japan	
Loss	8–5	Yoshihisa Yamamoto	Submission (armbar)	RINGS: Rise 1st	20 March 1999	1	2:40	Japan	
Loss	8–4	Gilbert Yvel	TKO (shoulder injury)	RINGS Holland: Who's the Boss	7 June 1998	1	0:38	Netherlands	
Win	8–3	Kiyoshi Tamura	Submission (kneebar)	RINGS: Fighting Integration II	16 April 1998	1	6:39	Osaka, Japan	
Win	7–3	Kenichi Yamamoto	TKO (knee)	RINGS: Fighting Integration	28 March 1998	1	6:36	Japan	
Win	6–3	Dexter Casey	Submission (guillotine choke)	Night of the Samurai 1	7 March 1998	1	1:50	England	
Win	5–3	Chris Haseman	Decision (majority)	RINGS Holland: The King of Rings	8 February 1998	2	5:00	Netherlands	
Loss	4–3	Wataru Sakata	Submission (ankle lock)	RINGS: Extension Fighting 7	26 September 1997	1	2:16	Sapporo, Japan	
Loss	4–2	Mitsuya Nagai	Submission (heel hook)	Rings: Fighting Extension III	23 May 1997	1	4:58	Sendai, Japan	
Win	4–1	Cees Bezems	Submission (heel hook)	RINGs Holland: Utrecht at War	29 June 1997	1	0:56	Netherlands	
Win	3–1	Masayuki Naruse	TKO (cut)	RINGS Holland: The Final Challenge	2 February 1997	1	3:58	Netherlands	
Loss	2–1	Wataru Sakata	Submission (armbar)	RINGS: Maelstrom V	16 July 1996	1	6:24	Osaka, Japan	
Win	2–0	Jeroen Waringa	KO (punch)	Fight Gala: Mix Fight Night	15 June 1996	1	N/A	Netherlands	
Win	1–0	Tjerk Vermanen	Submission (rear-naked choke)	RINGS Holland: Kings of Martial Arts	18 February 1996	1	0:44	Netherlands	

== Kickboxing record ==
Kickboxing Record
0 Wins, 1 Loss, 1 NC
Date	Result	Opponent	Event	Location	Method	Round	Time
2013-02-23	NC	(United States) James Wilson	S-1 Challenge	Miami, USA	NC (Unsafe ring)	N/A	N/A
1995	Loss	(Netherlands) Remy Bonjasky	Vini Vidi Vici	Netherlands	TKO (Corner stoppage)	2	N/A
Legend: Win Loss Draw/No contest Notes

== See also ==
- List of male mixed martial artists
- List of Strikeforce alumni
