= Iouri Bekichev =

Russian mixed martial arts fighter

- Born: August 5, 1965 (age 61); Kamensk-Uralsky, Russia
- Nationality: Russian
- Division: Light heavyweight Heavyweight
- Team: Russian Top Team
- Years active: 1997 - 2005

Mixed martial arts record
- Total: 7
- Wins: 2
- By knockout: 2
- Losses: 5
- By knockout: 1
- By submission: 2
- By decision: 2

Other information
- Mixed martial arts record from Sherdog

Iouri Bekichev is a Russian mixed martial artist. He competed in the Light heavyweight and Heavyweight divisions.

== Mixed martial arts record ==
Professional record breakdown
7 matches	2 wins	5 losses
By knockout	2	1
By submission	0	2
By decision	0	2

Res.	Record	Opponent	Method	Event	Date	Round	Time	Location	Notes
Win	2-5	Hiromitsu Kanehara	TKO	Rings Russia: CIS vs. The World	August 20, 2005	1	0:00	Yekaterinburg, Sverdlovsk Oblast, Russia	
Loss	1-5	Valentin Golubovskij	Decision (2-0 points)	Rings Lithuania: Bushido Rings 2	May 8, 2001	2	0:00	Vilnius, Lithuania	
Loss	1-4	Jeremy Horn	Submission (arm-triangle choke)	Rings: World Title Series 1	April 20, 2001	1	0:50	Kanagawa, Japan	
Loss	1-3	Emil Kristev	Decision (1-0 points)	Rings Russia: Russia vs. Bulgaria	April 6, 2001	1	10:00	Yekaterinburg, Russia	
Win	1-2	Chris Haseman	KO (punch)	Rings Russia: Russia vs. The World	May 20, 2000	1	2:30	Yekaterinburg, Sverdlovsk Oblast, Russia	
Loss	0-2	Bob Schrijber	TKO	Rings Russia: Russia vs. Holland	April 25, 1998	1	3:01	Yekaterinburg, Russia	
Loss	0-1	Peter Dijkman	Submission (rear naked choke)	Rings Holland: The Final Challenge	February 2, 1997	1	2:25	Amsterdam, North Holland, Netherlands	

== See also ==
- List of male mixed martial artists
