= Bob Schrijber =

Dutch kickboxer and mixed martial arts fighter

Robert Schrijber
- Born: 3 March 1965 (age 61); Alkmaar, Netherlands
- Other names: Dirty Bob
- Height: 6 ft 0 in (1.83 m)
- Weight: 237 lb (108 kg; 16.9 st)
- Division: Heavyweight
- Reach: 75 in (191 cm)
- Style: MMA; Kickboxing, Muay thai, Judo, Karate
- Stance: Orthodox
- Fighting out of: Wormer, Netherlands
- Team: Mejiro Gym; Team Schreiber
- Years active: 1997–2008

Mixed martial arts record
- Total: 38
- Wins: 20
- By knockout: 19
- By submission: 1
- Losses: 17
- By knockout: 2
- By submission: 10
- By decision: 4
- By disqualification: 1
- Draws: 1

Other information
- Mixed martial arts record from Sherdog

Robert Schrijber (born 3 March 1965) is a Dutch former mixed martial artist and kickboxer. He currently runs his own MMA and Muay Thai team in Krommenie, Netherlands called Sports Academy Schreiber. His most famous students at the moment are UFC fighter Stefan Struve, and professional wrestler Tom Büdgen, also known as Aleister Black in WWE.

== Background ==
Schrijber was born in Alkmaar, Netherlands. His parents divorced when he was young, which separated Schrijber and his brother Fred, who had a close relationship. Schrijber had a troubled childhood and began abusing drugs and alcohol from a young age. He also had an interest in punk rock music, starting a band with his brother, and got a job melting copper in a factory. Around this time, the young Schrijber began practicing Judo and Karate at a local gym.

== Fighting career ==
Schrijber started his martial arts career in 1981, when he started training in karate and judo in Haarlem, Netherlands. A year later he started training Muay Thai at the same gym. After his transition to the acclaimed Mejiro Gym, he started training with seven time muay thai world champion Rob Kaman. At this gym Schrijber became the Dutch and WKA European muay thai champion. In his shot at the WKA World title against Zijo Poljo, Schreiber crushed his left ankle in the third round. Although he did finish the fight, he lost a jury decision.

In 1995 he started his MMA career. He fought notable opponents like Heath Herring, Wanderlei Silva, Semmy Schilt and Igor Vovchanchyn and made three appearances in Pride FC. His last appearance as an MMA fighter was in 2008 against Barrington Patterson, which he lost due to a unanimous decision.

== Personal life ==
After retirement Bob works as coach. He also acts in films

== Championships and Accomplishments ==
- International Mix-Fight Association
  - IMA KO Power Tournament Winner
- M-1 Global
  - 1997 M-1 MFC World Championship Tournament Winner
- World Vale Tudo Championship
  - WVC 9 Tournament Runner Up

== Mixed martial arts record ==
Professional record breakdown
38 matches	20 wins	17 losses
By knockout	19	2
By submission	1	10
By decision	0	4
By disqualification	0	1
Draws	1	

Res.	Record	Opponent	Method	Event	Date	Round	Time	Location	Notes
Loss	20–17–1	Barrington Patterson	Decision (unanimous)	KOE: Tough Is Not Enough	October 5, 2008	2	5:00	Rotterdam, Netherlands	Fight was for W.I.P.U. "King of the Ring" veterans title +103 kg.
Loss	20–16–1	Melvin Manhoef	Decision (unanimous)	It's Showtime Boxing & MMA Event 2005 Amsterdam	June 12, 2005	2	5:00	Amsterdam, Netherlands	
Loss	20–15–1	Roman Zentsov	Submission (rear-naked choke)	M-1 MFC - Russia vs. the World 6	October 10, 2003	1	2:12	Moscow, Russia	
Loss	20–14–1	Igor Vovchanchyn	Submission (rear-naked choke)	It's Showtime 2003 Amsterdam	June 8, 2003	2	4:05	Amsterdam, Netherlands	
Win	20–13–1	Melvin Manhoef	KO (punches)	2H2H 6: Simply the Best 6	March 16, 2003	1	4:01	Rotterdam, Netherlands	
Loss	19–13–1	Cyrille Diabaté	Decision	2H2H 5: Simply the Best 5	October 13, 2002	2	3:00	Rotterdam, Netherlands	
Loss	19–12–1	Sokun Koh	Decision (split)	Pride The Best Vol.2	July 20, 2002	2	5:00	Tokyo, Japan	
Loss	19–11–1	Gilbert Yvel	TKO (doctor stoppage)	2H2H 4: Simply the Best 4	March 17, 2002	N/A	N/A	Rotterdam, Netherlands	
Win	19–10–1	Martin Malkhasyan	TKO (punches)	M-1 MFC - Russia vs. the World 2	November 11, 2001	1	8:40	Saint Petersburg, Russia	
Win	18–10–1	Martin Malkhasyan	KO	2H2H 3: Hotter Than Hot	October 7, 2001	N/A	6:48	Rotterdam, Netherlands	
Draw	17–10–1	Bobby Hoffman	Draw	Rings Holland: No Guts, No Glory	June 10, 2001	2	5:00	Amsterdam, Netherlands	
Loss	17–10	Gary Goodridge	Submission (kneebar)	2H2H 2: Simply The Best	March 18, 2001	1	2:32	Rotterdam, Netherlands	
Win	17–9	Ian Freeman	TKO (doctor stoppage)	It's Showtime - Christmas Edition	December 12, 2000	1	1:28	Haarlem, Netherlands	
Loss	16–9	Semmy Schilt	Technical Submission (guillotine choke)	It's Showtime - Exclusive	October 22, 2000	2	1:00	Haarlem, Netherlands	
Win	16–8	Peter Varga	KO	Battle of Arnhem 2	September 3, 2000	N/A	N/A	Arnhem, Netherlands	
Win	15–8	Hugo Duarte	TKO (punches)	2H2H 1: 2 Hot 2 Handle	March 5, 2000	1	3:34	Rotterdam, Netherlands	
Loss	14–8	Wanderlei Silva	Submission (rear-naked choke)	Pride Grand Prix 2000 Opening Round	January 30, 2000	1	2:42	Tokyo, Japan	2000 PRIDE Openweight Grand Prix Alternate Bout.
Win	14–7	Moti Horenstein	TKO (submission to punches)	Amsterdam Absolute Championship 2	November 27, 1999	1	3:04	Amsterdam, Netherlands	
Win	13–7	Jerrel Venetiaan	KO (punch)	It's Showtime - It's Showtime	October 24, 1999	1	3:42	Haarlem, Netherlands	
Loss	12–7	Heath Herring	TKO (punches)	World Vale Tudo Championship 9	September 27, 1999	1	2:19	Oranjestad, Aruba	WVC 9 Tournament Finals.
Loss	12–6	Alexandre Ferreira	Submission (rear-naked choke)	World Vale Tudo Championship 9	September 27, 1999	1	2:11	Oranjestad, Aruba	WVC 9 Tournament Semifinals.
Win	12–5	Josh Sursa	TKO (submission to elbows)	World Vale Tudo Championship 9	September 27, 1999	1	0:57	Oranjestad, Aruba	WVC 9 Tournament Quarterfinals.
Loss	11–5	Daijiro Matsui	DQ (illegal axe-kick after the bell)	Pride 7	September 12, 1999	1	10:00	Yokohama, Japan	Schreiber delivered an axe-kick after the bell to the back of Matsui's head while Matsui was on all fours.
Win	11–4	Toon Stelling	TKO	Battle of Arnhem 1	September 5, 1999	N/A	N/A	Arnhem, Netherlands	
Win	10–4	Big Mo T	KO	FFH: Free Fight Gala	September 1, 1999	N/A	N/A	Beverwijk, Netherlands	
Win	9–4	Moti Horenstein	KO	Amsterdam Absolute Championship 1	October 25, 1998	N/A	N/A	Amsterdam, Netherlands	
Loss	8–4	Mikhail Avetisyan	Submission (rear-naked choke)	IAFC: Pankration European Championship 1998	May 23, 1998	1	12:04	Moscow, Russia	
Win	8–3	Iouri Bekichev	TKO	Rings Russia: Russia vs. Holland	April 25, 1998	1	3:01	Yekaterinburg, Russia	
Win	7–3	Gilbert Yvel	KO	IMA: KO Power Tournament	April 12, 1998	1	4:15	Amsterdam, Netherlands	Won IMA: KO Power Tournament
Win	6–3	Glen Brown	TKO	IMA: KO Power Tournament	April 12, 1998	1	3:26	Amsterdam, Netherlands	IMA: KO Power Tournament Semifinals.
Loss	5–3	Gilbert Yvel	Submission (achilles lock)	Rings Holland: The King of Rings	February 8, 1998	2	1:12	Amsterdam, Netherlands	
Win	5–2	Ruslan Kerselyan	KO (kick)	M-1 MFC - World Championship 1997	November 1, 1997	1	2:53	Saint Petersburg, Russia	Won 1997 M-1 Global World Championship Tournament.
Win	4–2	Emil Stroka	TKO (submission to strikes)	M-1 MFC - World Championship 1997	November 1, 1997	1	0:54	Saint Petersburg, Russia	1997 M-1 Global World Championship Tournament Semifinals.
Win	3–2	Toon Stelling	TKO (punches)	Rings Holland - The Final Challenge	February 2, 1997	1	6:01	Amsterdam, Netherlands	
Win	2–2	Emil Kristev	Submission (guillotine choke)	Rings Holland - Kings of Martial Arts	February 18, 1996	1	4:09	Amsterdam, Netherlands	
Win	1–2	Aruzini Lusinoff	KO	Rings - Budokan Hall 1995	January 25, 1995	N/A	N/A	Tokyo, Japan	
Loss	0–2	Ed de Kruijf	Submission (forearm choke)	Cage Fight Tournament 1	January 1, 1995	1	4:20	Antwerp, Belgium	
Loss	0–1	Rudi de Loos	Submission (rear-naked choke)	CFT 1: Cage Fight Tournament 1	January 1, 1995	1	2:26	Antwerp, Belgium	

== Kickboxing record (incomplete) ==
Professional kickboxing record
? wins, ? loss, ? draw
Date	Result	Opponent	Event	Location	Method	Round	Time	Record
1999-03-27	Loss	Lloyd van Dams	Amsterdam Fight Night 1999	Amsterdam, Netherlands	Decision (Unanimous)	5	3:00	6-5
1998-05-31	Loss	Lloyd van Dams	Fight Of The Decade 1998	Amsterdam, Netherlands	TKO (Corner stoppage)	4	3:00	6-4
1995-07-18	Win	Kenneth Felter	Rings Japan	Osaka, Japan	Decision	5	3:00	6-3
1995-01-25	Win	Aldinov Roussimov	Rings Japan	Tokyo, Japan	TKO	2	2:46	6-3
1994-05-08	Loss	Ernesto Hoost	K-1: K-2 Grand Prix '94	Amsterdam, Netherlands	TKO	1	3:00	5-3
1994-05-08	Win	Artem Tonoyan	K-1: K-2 Grand Prix '94	Amsterdam, Netherlands	-	5	3:00	5-2
1994-05-08	Win	Zijo Poljo	K-1: K-2 Grand Prix '94	Amsterdam, Netherlands	-	5	3:00	4-2
1994-03-06	Loss	Stan Longinidis	Taipan 1: The Best Of The Best 1994	Australia	Decision (unanimous)	5	3:00	3-2
1994-01-22	Win	Lee Hasdell	WKA: Moscow Fight Night 1994	Moscow, Russia	Tko (Low kicks)	5	-	3-1
1993-12-25	Win	Kazuyuki Mori	Rings Japan	Tokyo, Japan	Tko (Body Kick)	2	0:47	2-1
1993-08-06	Loss	Jan Lomulder	Rings Japan	Tokyo, Japan	Decision	5	3:00	1-1
1993-06-09	Win	Toshiyuki Atokawa	Rings Japan	Tokyo, Japan	-	5	3:00	1-0
