= Emil Kristev =

Bulgarian mixed martial artist

- Born: Bulgaria
- Nationality: Bulgarian
- Team: Rings Bulgaria
- Years active: 1996 - 2001

Mixed martial arts record
- Total: 4
- Wins: 1
- By decision: 1
- Losses: 3
- By knockout: 1
- By submission: 2

Other information
- Mixed martial arts record from Sherdog

Emil Kristev is a Bulgarian mixed martial artist.

== Mixed martial arts record ==
Professional record breakdown
4 matches	1 win	3 losses
By knockout	0	1
By submission	0	2
By decision	1	0

Res.	Record	Opponent	Method	Event	Date	Round	Time	Location	Notes
Loss	1-3	Remigijus Kazaciunas	TKO	Rings Lithuania: Bushido Rings 2	May 8, 2001	0	0:00	Vilnius, Lithuania	
Win	1-2	Iouri Bekichev	Decision (1-0 points)	Rings Russia: Russia vs. Bulgaria	April 6, 2001	1	10:00	Yekaterinburg, Russia	
Loss	0-2	Mikhail Ilyukhin	Submission (achilles lock)	Rings Russia: Russia vs. Bulgaria	May 21, 2000	1	0:00	Tula, Russia	
Loss	0-1	Bob Schrijber	Submission (guillotine choke)	Rings Holland: Kings of Martial Arts	February 18, 1996	1	4:09	Amsterdam, North Holland, Netherlands	

== See also ==
- List of male mixed martial artists
