= 1996 in Pancrase =

Mixed martial arts events

Information
- First date: January 28, 1996
- Last date: December 15, 1996

Events
- Total events: 13

Fights
- Total fights: 84
- Title fights: 4

Chronology
1995 in Pancrase	1996 in Pancrase	1997 in Pancrase

The year 1996 was the fourth year in the history of Pancrase, a mixed martial arts promotion based in Japan. In 1996 Pancrase held 13 events beginning with Pancrase: Truth 1.

== Title fights ==
Title fights in 1996
Weight class				Method	Round	Time	Event	Notes
Openweight	Frank Shamrock	def.	Minoru Suzuki	Submission (Kneebar)	1	22:53	Pancrase - Truth 1	(Note: For The interim Pancrase Openweight Championship.)
Openweight	Bas Rutten	def.	Frank Shamrock	TKO (Doctor Stoppage)	1	11:11	Pancrase - Truth 5	(Note: For The Pancrase Openweight Championship.)
Openweight	Bas Rutten	def.	Masakatsu Funaki	KO (Knee)	1	17:05	Pancrase - 1996 Anniversary Show	(Note: For The Pancrase Openweight Championship.)
Openweight	Masakatsu Funaki	def.	Jason Delucia	TKO (Leg Injury)	1	7:49	Pancrase - Truth 10	(Note: For The Pancrase Openweight Championship.)

== Events list ==
#	Event title	Date	Arena	Location
37	Pancrase: Truth 10	December 15, 1996	Japanese Martial Arts Building	Tokyo, Japan
36	Pancrase: Truth 9	November 9, 1996	Kobe Fashion Mart	Kobe, Hyogo, Japan
35	Pancrase: Truth 8	October 22, 1996	Korakuen Hall	Tokyo, Japan
34	Pancrase: Truth 7	October 8, 1996	Tsuyuhashi Sport Center	Nagoya, Aichi, Japan
33	Pancrase: 1996 Anniversary Show	September 7, 1996	Tokyo Bay NK Hall	Urayasu, Chiba, Japan
32	Pancrase: 1996 Neo-Blood Tournament, Round 2	July 23, 1996	Korakuen Hall	Tokyo, Japan
31	Pancrase: 1996 Neo-Blood Tournament, Round 1	July 22, 1996	Korakuen Hall	Tokyo, Japan
30	Pancrase: Truth 6	June 25, 1996	Fukuoka Convention Center	Fukuoka, Fukuoka, Japan
29	Pancrase: Truth 5	May 16, 1996	Nippon Budokan	Tokyo, Japan
28	Pancrase: Truth 4	April 7, 1996	Korakuen Hall	Tokyo, Japan
27	Pancrase: Truth 3	April 7, 1996	Korakuen Hall	Tokyo, Japan
26	Pancrase: Truth 2	March 2, 1996	Kobe Fashion Mart	Kobe, Hyogo, Japan
25	Pancrase: Truth 1	January 28, 1996	Yokohama Cultural Gymnasium	Yokohama, Kanagawa, Japan

== Pancrase: Truth 1 ==
Pancrase: Truth 1
- Date: January 28, 1996
- Venue: Yokohama Cultural Gymnasium
- City: Yokohama, Kanagawa, Japan

Pancrase: Truth 1 was an event held on January 28, 1996, at the Yokohama Cultural Gymnasium in Yokohama, Kanagawa, Japan.

=== Results ===
Main Card
Weight class				Method	Round	Time	Notes
	Frank Shamrock	def.	Minoru Suzuki	Submission (Kneebar)	1	22:53	(Note: For the interim Pancrase Openweight Championship.)
	Ken Shamrock	def.	Kazuo Takahashi	Decision (Lost Points)	1	20:00
	Masakatsu Funaki	def.	Ryushi Yanagisawa	Technical Submission (Keylock)	1	8:42
	Jason DeLucia	def.	Katsuomi Inagaki	Submission (Arm-Triangle Choke)	1	4:56
	Takaku Fuke	def.	Leon van Dijk	Decision (Lost Points)	1	10:00
	Guy Mezger	def.	Gregory Smit	Decision (Lost Points)	1	10:00
	Kiuma Kunioku	vs.	Osami Shibuya	Draw (Split)	1	10:00
	Yuki Kondo	def.	Takafumi Ito	Technical Submission (Guillotine Choke)	1	2:21

== Pancrase: Truth 2 ==
Pancrase: Truth 2
- Date: March 2, 1996
- Venue: Kobe Fashion Mart
- City: Kobe, Hyogo, Japan

Pancrase: Truth 2 was an event held on March 2, 1996, at the Kobe Fashion Mart in Kobe, Hyogo, Japan.

=== Results ===
Main Card
Weight class				Method	Round	Time	Notes
	Bas Rutten	def.	Guy Mezger	Submission (Ankle Lock)	1	19:36
	Frank Shamrock	def.	Ryushi Yanagisawa	Decision (Lost Points)	1	20:00
	Minoru Suzuki	def.	Takaku Fuke	Submission (Armbar)	1	4:15
	Masakatsu Funaki	def.	Katsuomi Inagaki	Submission (Kneebar)	1	1:14
	Jason DeLucia	def.	Kazuo Takahashi	TKO (Head Kick)	1	3:37
	Yuki Kondo	def.	Osami Shibuya	Decision (Lost Points)	1	10:00
	Kiuma Kunioku	def.	Takafumi Ito	KO (Head Kick)	1	0:54

== Pancrase: Truth 3 ==
Pancrase: Truth 3
- Date: April 7, 1996
- Venue: Korakuen Hall
- City: Tokyo, Japan

Pancrase: Truth 3 was an event held on April 7, 1996, at Korakuen Hall in Tokyo, Japan.

=== Results ===
Main Card
Weight class				Method	Round	Time	Notes
	Ryushi Yanagisawa	def.	Vernon White	Submission (Ankle Lock)	1	12:47
	Guy Mezger	def.	Manabu Yamada	TKO (Doctor Stoppage)	1	6:14
	Ryushi Yanagisawa	def.	Larry Papadopoulos	Submission (Ankle Lock)	1	3:21
	Vernon White	def.	Kazuo Takahashi	Decision (Lost Points)	1	10:00
	Manabu Yamada	def.	Leon van Dijk	Submission (Ankle Lock)	1	2:53
	Guy Mezger	def.	Takaku Fuke	Decision (Unanimous)	1	10:00

== Pancrase: Truth 4 ==
Pancrase: Truth 4
- Date: April 7, 1996
- Venue: Korakuen Hall
- City: Tokyo, Japan

Pancrase: Truth 4 was an event held on April 7, 1996, at Korakuen Hall in Tokyo, Japan.

=== Results ===
Main Card
Weight class				Method	Round	Time	Notes
	Guy Mezger	def.	Ryushi Yanagisawa	KO (Head Kick)	1	12:21
	Bas Rutten	def.	Katsuomi Inagaki	Technical Decision (Lost Points)	1	14:07
	Frank Shamrock	def.	Osami Shibuya	Decision (Lost Points)	1	15:00
	Jason DeLucia	def.	Kiuma Kunioku	Decision (Lost Points)	1	15:00

== Pancrase: Truth 5 ==
Pancrase: Truth 5
- Date: May 16, 1996
- Venue: Nippon Budokan
- City: Tokyo, Japan

Pancrase: Truth 5 was an event held on May 16, 1996, at Nippon Budokan in Tokyo, Japan.

=== Results ===
Main Card
Weight class				Method	Round	Time	Notes
	Bas Rutten	def.	Frank Shamrock	TKO (Doctor Stoppage)	1	11:11	(Note: For The Pancrase Openweight Championship.)
	Guy Mezger	def.	Minoru Suzuki	TKO (Slam)	1	7:59
	Masakatsu Funaki	def.	August Smisl	Submission (Rear-Naked Choke)	1	2:01
	Jason DeLucia	def.	Osami Shibuya	Decision (Lost Points)	1	15:00
	Ryushi Yanagisawa	def.	Oleg Taktarov	Decision (Lost Points)	1	15:00
	Takaku Fuke	vs.	Vernon White	Draw (Unanimous)	1	10:00
	Semmy Schilt	def.	Manabu Yamada	Submission (Rear-Naked Choke)	1	5:44
	Kazuo Takahashi	def.	Takafumi Ito	Decision (Unanimous)	1	10:00
	Yuki Kondo	vs.	Kiuma Kunioku	Draw (Majority)	1	10:00

== Pancrase: Truth 6 ==
Pancrase: Truth 6
- Date: June 25, 1996
- Venue: Fukuoka Convention Center
- City: Fukuoka, Fukuoka, Japan

Pancrase: Truth 6 was an event held on June 25, 1996, at Fukuoka Convention Center in Fukuoka, Fukuoka, Japan.

=== Results ===
Main Card
Weight class				Method	Round	Time	Notes
	Masakatsu Funaki	def.	Vernon White	Submission (Ankle Lock)	1	2:34
	Bas Rutten	def.	Jason DeLucia	KO (Liver Punch)	1	8:48
	Ryushi Yanagisawa	def.	Takaku Fuke	Decision (Lost Points)	1	15:00
	Yuki Kondo	def.	Minoru Suzuki	Decision (Lost Points)	1	15:00
	Manabu Yamada	vs.	Kazuo Takahashi	Draw (Split)	1	10:00
	Guy Mezger	vs.	Osami Shibuya	Draw (Majority)	1	10:00
	Kiuma Kunioku	def.	Takafumi Ito	Decision (Lost Points)	1	10:00

== Pancrase: 1996 Neo-Blood Tournament, Round 1 ==
Pancrase: 1996 Neo-Blood Tournament, Round 1
- Date: July 22, 1996
- Venue: Korakuen Hall
- City: Tokyo, Japan

Pancrase: 1996 Neo-Blood Tournament, Round 1 was an event held on July 22, 1996, at Korakuen Hall in Tokyo, Japan.

=== Results ===
Main Card
Weight class				Method	Round	Time	Notes
	Frank Shamrock	def.	Manabu Yamada	Submission (Rear-Naked Choke)	1	12:44
	Kazuo Takahashi	def.	Ryushi Yanagisawa	Decision (Lost Points)	1	15:00
	Yuki Kondo	def.	Semmy Schilt	Decision (Split)	1	10:00
	Keiichiro Yamamiya	def.	Satoshi Hasegawa	Decision (Split)	1	10:00
	Pete Williams	def.	Kiuma Kunioku	Decision (Unanimous)	1	10:00
	Osami Shibuya	def.	Jong Wang Kim	Submission (Rear-Naked Choke)	1	0:49

== Pancrase: 1996 Neo-Blood Tournament, Round 2 ==
Pancrase: 1996 Neo-Blood Tournament, Round 2
- Date: July 23, 1996
- Venue: Korakuen Hall
- City: Tokyo, Japan

Pancrase: 1996 Neo-Blood Tournament, Round 2 was an event held on July 23, 1996, at Korakuen Hall in Tokyo, Japan.

=== Results ===
Main Card
Weight class				Method	Round	Time	Notes
	Yuki Kondo	def.	Pete Williams	Decision (Unanimous)	1	20:00
	Osami Shibuya	def.	Keiichiro Yamamiya	Submission (Ankle Lock)	1	6:48
	Masakatsu Funaki	def.	Takafumi Ito	Submission (Rear-Naked Choke)	1	2:01
	Vernon White	def.	Minoru Suzuki	Decision (Majority)	1	15:00
	Yuki Kondo	def.	Keiichiro Yamamiya	TKO (Palm Strikes)	1	6:16
	Pete Williams	def.	Osami Shibuya	Decision (Lost Points)	1	10:00

== Pancrase: 1996 Anniversary Show ==
Pancrase: 1996 Anniversary Show
- Date: September 7, 1996
- Venue: Tokyo Bay NK Hall
- City: Urayasu, Chiba, Japan

Pancrase: 1996 Anniversary Show was an event held on September 7, 1996, at Tokyo Bay NK Hall in Urayasu, Chiba, Japan.

=== Results ===
Main Card
Weight class				Method	Round	Time	Notes
	Bas Rutten	def.	Masakatsu Funaki	KO (Knee)	1	17:05	(Note: For The Pancrase Openweight Championship.)
	Guy Mezger	def.	Ryushi Yanagisawa	Decision (Unanimous)	1	20:00
	Jason DeLucia	def.	Minoru Suzuki	KO (Palm Strike)	1	4:58
	Vernon White	def.	Kazuo Takahashi	KO (Head Kick)	1	19:43
	Yuki Kondo	def.	Frank Shamrock	KO (Head Kick)	1	12:43
	Manabu Yamada	def.	Kiuma Kunioku	Submission (Guillotine Choke)	1	8:29
	Katsuomi Inagaki	def.	Keiichiro Yamamiya	Decision (Majority)	1	10:00
	Takafumi Ito	vs.	Osami Shibuya	Draw (Majority)	1	10:00
	Satoshi Hasegawa	def.	Jong Wang Kim	Submission (Ankle Lock)	1	3:40

== Pancrase: Truth 7 ==
Pancrase: Truth 7
- Date: October 8, 1996
- Venue: Tsuyuhashi Sport Center
- City: Nagoya, Aichi, Japan

Pancrase: Truth 7 was an event held on October 8, 1996, at the Tsuyuhashi Sport Center in Nagoya, Aichi, Japan.

=== Results ===
Main Card
Weight class				Method	Round	Time	Notes
	Bas Rutten	def.	Manabu Yamada	Submission (Ankle Lock)	1	0:54
	Jason DeLucia	def.	Yuki Kondo	Decision (Lost Points)	1	20:00
	Osami Shibuya	def.	Vernon White	Decision (Lost Points)	1	20:00
	Minoru Suzuki	def.	Takafumi Ito	Decision (Majority)	1	10:00
	Kiuma Kunioku	def.	Guy Mezger	Decision (Split)	1	10:00
	Ryushi Yanagisawa	def.	Semmy Schilt	Submission (Ankle Lock)	1	0:51
	Katsuomi Inagaki	def.	Satoshi Hasegawa	Decision (Unanimous)	1	10:00

== Pancrase: Truth 8 ==
Pancrase: Truth 8
- Date: October 22, 1996
- Venue: Korakuen Hall
- City: Tokyo, Japan

Pancrase: Truth 8 was an event held on October 22, 1996, at Korakuen Hall in Tokyo, Japan.

=== Results ===
Main Card
Weight class				Method	Round	Time	Notes
	Ryushi Yanagisawa	vs.	Takafumi Ito	Draw (Unanimous)	1	10:00
	Osami Shibuya	def.	Satoshi Hasegawa	Decision (Unanimous)	1	10:00
	Kiuma Kunioku	def.	Keiichiro Yamamiya	Submission (Armbar)	1	1:38

== Pancrase: Truth 9 ==
Pancrase: Truth 9
- Date: November 9, 1996
- Venue: Kobe Fashion Mart
- City: Kobe, Japan

Pancrase: Truth 9 was an event held on November 9, 1996, at the Kobe Fashion Mart in Kobe, Hyogo, Japan.

=== Results ===
Main Card
Weight class				Method	Round	Time	Notes
	Masakatsu Funaki	def.	Yuki Kondo	Submission (Rear-Naked Choke)	1	1:43
	Jason DeLucia	def.	Osami Shibuya	Submission (Rear-Naked Choke)	1	11:45
	Kazuo Takahashi	def.	Keiichiro Yamamiya	Submission (Guillotine Choke)	1	7:12
	Kiuma Kunioku	def.	Satoshi Hasegawa	TKO (Palm Strikes)	1	6:32
	Jong Wang Kim	def.	Takafumi Ito	TKO (Palm Strikes)	1	2:11

== Pancrase: Truth 10 ==
Pancrase: Truth 10
- Date: December 15, 1996
- Venue: Japanese Martial Arts Building
- City: Tokyo, Japan

Pancrase: Truth 10 was an event held on December 15, 1996, at the Japanese Martial Arts Building in Tokyo, Japan.

=== Results ===
Main Card
Weight class				Method	Round	Time	Notes
	Masakatsu Funaki	def.	Jason Delucia	TKO (Leg Injury)	1	7:49	(Note: For The Pancrase Openweight Championship.)
	Guy Mezger	def.	Yuki Kondo	Decision (Lost Points)	1	20:00
	Kiuma Kunioku	def.	Frank Shamrock	Decision (Unanimous)	1	20:00
	Ryushi Yanagisawa	def.	Jack McLaughlin	Submission (Twister)	1	0:51
	Semmy Schilt	def.	Osami Shibuya	Decision (Majority)	1	10:00
	Takaku Fuke	def.	Jong Wang Kim	Submission (North-South Choke)	1	2:09
	Keiichiro Yamamiya	def.	Wes Gassaway	Decision (Unanimous)	1	10:00

== See also ==
- Pancrase
- List of Pancrase champions
- List of Pancrase events
