= List of Pancrase events =

This is a list of events held and scheduled by Pancrase, a mixed martial arts promotion based in Japan.

== Scheduled events ==
#	Event	Date	Venue	Location	Source
425	Pancrase Blood.12	August 9, 2026	Shinagawa Intercity Hall	Tokyo, Japan	
426	Pancrase 365	September 6, 2026	Tachikawa Stage Garden	Tachikawa, Tokyo, Japan	
427	Pancrase 366	September 23, 2026	Tachikawa Stage Garden	Tachikawa, Tokyo, Japan	
428	Pancrase 367	October 4, 2026	New Pier Hall	Tokyo, Japan	
429	Pancrase 368	November 8, 2026	New Pier Hall	Tokyo, Japan	
430	Pancrase 369	December 20, 2026	Tachikawa Stage Garden	Tachikawa, Tokyo, Japan	

== Past events ==
#	Event	Date	Venue	Location	Source
424	Pancrase Blood.11	July 26, 2026	New Pier Hall	Tokyo, Japan	
423	Pancrase 364	July 26, 2026	New Pier Hall	Tokyo, Japan	
422	Pancrase 363	June 28, 2026	New Pier Hall	Tokyo, Japan	
421	Pancrase 362	May 31, 2026	Tachikawa Stage Garden	Tachikawa, Tokyo, Japan	
420	Pancrase Blood.10	May 4, 2026	Shinagawa Intercity Hall	Tokyo, Japan	
419	Pancrase 361	March 14, 2026	Yokohama Budokan	Yokohama, Kanagawa, Japan	
418	Pancrase Blood.9	February 11, 2026	Shinagawa Intercity Hall	Tokyo, Japan	
417	Pancrase 360	December 21, 2025	Tachikawa Stage Garden	Tachikawa, Tokyo, Japan	
416	Pancrase 359	November 9, 2025	New Pier Hall	Tokyo, Japan	
415	Pancrase 358	November 9, 2025	New Pier Hall	Tokyo, Japan	
414	Pancrase 357	September 23, 2025	New Pier Hall	Tokyo, Japan	
413	Pancrase 356	September 23, 2025	New Pier Hall	Tokyo, Japan	
412	Pancrase Blood.8	August 10, 2025	Shinagawa Intercity Hall	Tokyo, Japan	
411	Pancrase 355	July 27, 2025	Tachikawa Stage Garden	Tachikawa, Tokyo, Japan	
410	Pancrase 354	June 1, 2025	New Pier Hall	Tokyo, Japan	
409	Pancrase Blood.7	May 18, 2025	Sumiyoshi Kumin Center	Osaka, Japan	
408	Pancrase Blood.6	May 6, 2025	Shinagawa Intercity Hall	Tokyo, Japan	
407	Pancrase 353	April 27, 2025	Tachikawa Stage Garden	Tachikawa, Tokyo, Japan	
406	Pancrase 352	March 9, 2025	Yokohama Budokan	Yokohama, Kanagawa, Japan	
405	Pancrase Blood.5	February 11, 2025	Shinagawa Intercity Hall	Tokyo, Japan	
404	Pancrase 351	December 15, 2024	New Pier Hall	Tokyo, Japan	
403	Pancrase 350	December 15, 2024	New Pier Hall	Tokyo, Japan	
402	Pancrase 349	November 10, 2024	New Pier Hall	Tokyo, Japan	
401	Pancrase 348	November 10, 2024	New Pier Hall	Tokyo, Japan	
400	Pancrase 347	September 29, 2024	Tachikawa Stage Garden	Tachikawa, Tokyo, Japan	
399	Pancrase Blood.4	August 25, 2024	Shinagawa Intercity Hall	Tokyo, Japan	
398	Pancrase Blood.3	July 28, 2024	Sumiyoshi Kumin Center	Osaka, Japan	
397	Pancrase 346	July 21, 2024	Tachikawa Stage Garden	Tachikawa, Tokyo, Japan	
396	Pancrase 345	June 30, 2024	New Pier Hall	Tokyo, Japan	
395	Pancrase 344	June 30, 2024	New Pier Hall	Tokyo, Japan	
394	Pancrase 343	May 25, 2024	New Pier Hall	Tokyo, Japan	
393	Pancrase 342	April 29, 2024	Tachikawa Stage Garden	Tachikawa, Tokyo, Japan	
392	Pancrase 341	March 31, 2024	Tachikawa Stage Garden	Tachikawa, Tokyo, Japan	
391	Pancrase Blood.2	February 25, 2024	Shinagawa Intercity Hall	Minato, Tokyo, Japan	
390	Pancrase Blood.1	February 18, 2024	Sumiyoshi Kumin Center	Osaka, Japan	
389	Pancrase 340: 30th Anniversary Tournament Vol.2	December 24, 2023	Yokohama Budokan	Yokohama, Kanagawa, Japan	
388	Pancrase 339	November 12, 2023	New Pier Hall	Minato, Tokyo, Japan	
387	Pancrase 338	November 12, 2023	New Pier Hall	Minato, Tokyo, Japan	
386	Pancrase Neo Blood! 6: Bantamweight Tournament Final	November 2, 2023	Shinagawa Intercity Hall	Shinagawa, Tokyo, Japan	
385	Pancrase 337: 30th Anniversary Tournament Vol.1	September 24, 2023	Tachikawa Stage Garden	Tachikawa, Tokyo, Japan	
384	Pancrase 29th Neo-Blood Tournament Finals	August 27, 2023	Shinagawa Intercity Hall	Shinagawa, Tokyo, Japan	
383	Pancrase 336	July 9, 2023	New Pier Hall	Minato, Tokyo Japan	
382	Pancrase 335	July 9, 2023	New Pier Hall	Minato, Tokyo Japan	
381	Pancrase 334 / 29th Neo-Blood Tournament 2nd Round	June 4, 2023	New Pier Hall	Minato, Tokyo, Japan	
380	Pancrase 333	April 30, 2023	Tachikawa Stage Garden	Tachikawa, Tokyo, Japan	
379	Pancrase 332	March 26, 2023	New Pier Hall	Minato, Tokyo, Japan	
378	Pancrase 331	March 25, 2023	New Pier Hall	Minato, Tokyo, Japan	
377	Pancrase 29th Neo-Blood Tournament	March 4, 2023	Shinagawa Intercity Hall	Minato, Tokyo, Japan	
376	Pancrase 330	December 25, 2022	Yokohama Budokan	Yokohama, Kanagawa, Japan	
375	Pancrase 28th Neo-Blood Tournament Finals	October 10, 2022	Tachikawa Stage Garden	Tachikawa, Tokyo, Japan	
374	Pancrase 329	September 11, 2022	Tachikawa Stage Garden	Tachikawa, Tokyo, Japan	
373	Pancrase 328	July 18, 2022	Bellesalle Takadanobaba	Shinjuku, Tokyo, Japan	
372	Pancrase 28th Neo-Blood Tournament 1st Round	May 22, 2022	Shinagawa Intercity Hall	Minato Tokyo, Japan	
371	Pancrase 327	April 29, 2022	Tachikawa Stage Garden	Tachikawa, Tokyo, Japan	
370	Pancrase & Deep - Osaka Tournament: Yoshiro Maeda Retirement Event	April 10, 2022	Umeda Stella Hall	Osaka, Japan	
369	Pancrase 326	March 21, 2022	Bellesalle Takadanobaba	Shinjuku, Tokyo, Japan	
368	Pancrase 325	December 11, 2021	Studio Coast	Tokyo, Japan	
367	Pancrase 324	October 16, 2021	Studio Coast	Tokyo, Japan	
366	Pancrase 323	September 12, 2021	Studio Coast	Tokyo, Japan	
365	Pancrase Osaka	July 17, 2021	Colega Studio	Osaka, Japan	
364	Pancrase 322	June 27, 2021	Studio Coast	Tokyo, Japan	
363	Pancrase 321	May 30, 2021	Studio Coast	Tokyo, Japan	
362	Pancrase Osaka	April 3, 2021	Colega Studio	Osaka, Japan	
361	Pancrase 320	December 13, 2020	Studio Coast	Tokyo, Japan	
360	DEEP & Pancrase Osaka	November 29, 2020	Sumiyoshi Kumin Center	Osaka, Japan	
359	Pancrase 319	October 25, 2020	Studio Coast	Tokyo, Japan	
358	Pancrase 318	September 27, 2020	Studio Coast	Tokyo, Japan	
357	Pancrase 317	August 23, 2020	Studio Coast	Tokyo, Japan	
356	Pancrase Osaka	August 9, 2020	Sumiyoshi Kumin Center	Osaka, Japan	
355	Pancrase 316	July 24, 2020	Studio Coast	Tokyo, Japan	
354	Pancrase 312	February 16, 2020	Studio Coast	Tokyo, Japan	
353	Pancrase 311	December 8, 2019	Studio Coast	Tokyo, Japan	
352	Pancrase & DEEP Osaka	November 17, 2019	Osaka Conference Center	Osaka, Japan	
351	Pancrase: 310	November 10, 2019	Studio Coast	Tokyo, Japan	
350	Pancrase: 309	October 20, 2019	Studio Coast	Tokyo, Japan	
349	Pancrase: 308	September 29, 2019	Studio Coast	Tokyo, Japan	
348	Pancrase Sapporo	September 23, 2019	Concarino	Sapporo, Hokkaido, Japan	
347	ONE Japan Series: Road to Century	September 1, 2019	Studio Coast	Tokyo, Japan	
346	Pancrase: 307	July 21, 2019	Studio Coast	Tokyo, Japan	
345	Pancrase Osaka	July 15, 2019	KADO-YA Hall	Osaka, Japan	
344	Pancrase: 306	June 30, 2019	Studio Coast	Tokyo, Japan	
343	Pancrase: 305	May 26, 2019	Studio Coast	Tokyo, Japan	
342	Pancrase: 304	April 14, 2019	Studio Coast	Tokyo, Japan	
341	Pancrase: 303	March 17, 2019	Studio Coast	Tokyo, Japan	
340	Pancrase Osaka	December 24, 2018	Abeno District Center	Osaka, Japan	
339	Pancrase: 302	December 9, 2018	Studio Coast	Tokyo, Japan	
338	Pancrase: 301	November 25, 2018	Studio Coast	Tokyo, Japan	
337	Pancrase: 300	October 21, 2018	Studio Coast	Tokyo, Japan	
336	Pancrase: 299	September 9, 2018	Studio Coast	Tokyo, Japan	
335	Pancrase: 298	August 5, 2018	Studio Coast	Tokyo, Japan	
334	Pancrase: 297	July 1, 2018	Studio Coast	Tokyo, Japan	
333	Pancrase: 296	May 20, 2018	Shinkiba Studio Coast	Tokyo, Japan	
332	Pancrase: Sapporo 5/13	May 13, 2018	Concarino	Sapporo, Hokkaido, Japan	
331	Pancrase: 295	Apr. 15, 2018	Studio Coast	Tokyo, Japan	
330	Pancrase: 294	Mar. 11, 2018	Shinkiba Studio Coast	Tokyo, Japan	
329	Pancrase: 293	Feb. 4, 2018	Studio Coast	Tokyo, Japan	
328	Pancrase: 292	Dec. 10, 2017	Differ Ariake	Tokyo, Japan	
327	Pancrase: 291	Nov. 12, 2017	Differ Ariake	Tokyo, Japan	
326	Pancrase: Sapporo	Oct. 22, 2017	Concarino	Sapporo, Hokkaido, Japan	
325	Pancrase: 290	Oct. 8, 2017	Differ Ariake	Tokyo, Japan	
324	Pancrase: 289	Aug. 20, 2017	Differ Ariake	Tokyo, Japan	
323	Pancrase: 288	July 2, 2017	Differ Ariake	Tokyo, Japan	
322	Pancrase: 287	May 28, 2017	Differ Ariake	Tokyo, Japan	
321	Pancrase: Sapporo	May 14, 2017	Concarino	Sapporo, Hokkaido, Japan	
320	Pancrase: 286	April 23, 2017	Differ Ariake	Tokyo, Japan	
319	Pancrase: 285	March 12, 2017	Differ Ariake	Tokyo, Japan	
318	Pancrase: 284	February 5, 2017	Differ Ariake	Tokyo, Japan	
317	Pancrase: 283	December 18, 2016	Differ Ariake	Tokyo, Japan	
316	Pancrase: Osaka	December 11, 2016	Abeno Kumin Center Hall	Osaka, Japan	
315	Pancrase: 282	November 13, 2016	Differ Ariake	Tokyo, Japan	
314	Pancrase: Sapporo	October 16, 2016	Sapporo Concarino	Sapporo, Hokkaido, Japan	
313	Pancrase: 281	October 2, 2016	Differ Ariake	Tokyo, Japan	
312	Pancrase: 280	September 11, 2016	Differ Ariake	Tokyo, Japan	
311	Pancrase: Osaka	July 31, 2016	Abeno Kumin Center Hall	Osaka, Japan	
310	Pancrase: 279	July 24, 2016	Differ Ariake	Tokyo, Japan	
309	Pancrase: 278	June 12, 2016	Differ Ariake	Tokyo, Japan	
308	Pancrase: Sapporo 2016	May 29, 2016	Kotoni Konkarinyo	Sapporo, Hokkaido, Japan	
307	Pancrase: 277	April 24, 2016	Differ Ariake	Tokyo, Japan	
306	Pancrase: 276	March 13, 2016	Differ Ariake	Tokyo, Japan	
305	Pancrase: 275	January 31, 2016	Differ Ariake	Tokyo, Japan	
304	Pancrase: Osaka	December 23, 2015	Asashi Ward Community Center Main Hall	Asashi, Osaka, Japan	
303	Pancrase: 274	December 19, 2015	West Japan General Exhibition Center	Kitakyushu, Fukuoka, Japan	
302	Pancrase: 273	December 13, 2015	Differ Ariake	Tokyo, Japan	
301	Pancrase: Sapporo 2015	December 5, 2015	Sapporo Concarino	Sapporo, Hokkaido, Japan	
300	Pancrase 272	November 28, 2015	Neal S. Blaisdell Center	Honolulu, Hawaii	
299	Pancrase 271	November 1, 2015	Differ Ariake	Tokyo, Japan	
298	Pancrase 270	October 4, 2015	Differ Ariake	Tokyo, Japan	
297	Pancrase 269	August 9, 2015	Differ Ariake	Tokyo, Japan	
296	Pancrase: Osaka	July 26, 2015	Azalea Taisho Hall	Osaka, Japan	
295	Pancrase - 268	July 5, 2015	Differ Ariake	Tokyo, Japan	
294	Pancrase - 267	May 31, 2015	Differ Ariake	Tokyo, Japan	
293	Pancrase - Sapporo 2015	May 17, 2015	Sapporo Cocarino	Sapporo, Hokkaido, Japan	
292	Pancrase - 266	April 26, 2015	Differ Ariake	Tokyo, Japan	
291	Pancrase - 265	March 15, 2015	Differ Ariake	Tokyo, Japan	
290	Pancrase - 264	January 31, 2015	Differ Ariake	Tokyo, Japan	
289	Pancrase - 263: All Into Power	December 6, 2014	Differ Ariake	Tokyo, Japan	
288	Pancrase - 262	November 2, 2014	Differ Ariake	Tokyo, Japan	
287	Pancrase - 261: World Slam	October 5, 2014	Differ Ariake	Tokyo, Japan	
286	Pancrase - 260	August 10, 2014	Differ Ariake	Tokyo, Japan	
285	Pancrase - Osaka	July 20, 2014	Azalea Taisho Hall	Osaka, Japan	
284	Pancrase - 2014 Pro-Am Open Catch Wrestling Tournament	July 13, 2014	P's Lab Yokohama	Yokohama, Kanagawa, Japan	
283	Pancrase: 259	June 29, 2014	Differ Ariake Arena	Tokyo, Japan	
282	Pancrase: 258: First Fight in the Cage	May 11, 2014	Differ Ariake Arena	Tokyo, Japan	
281	Pancrase: 257: Last Fight in the Ring	March 30, 2014	Yokohama Cultural Gymnasium	Yokohama Kanagawa,, Japan	
280	Pancrase: 256	February 2, 2014	Differ Ariake Arena	Tokyo, Japan	
279	Pancrase: 255	December 8, 2013	Differ Ariake Arena	Tokyo, Japan	
278	Pancrase: 254	December 7, 2013	Azalea Taisho Hall	Osaka, Japan	
277	Pancrase: 253	November 3, 2013	Differ Ariake Arena	Tokyo, Japan	
276	Pancrase 252: 20th Anniversary	September 29, 2013	Yokohama Cultural Gymnasium	Yokohama, Kanagawa, Japan	
275	Pancrase: 251	September 7, 2013	Shinjuku Face	Tokyo, Japan	
274	Pancrase 250: 2013 Neo-Blood Tournament Finals	July 28, 2013	Differ Ariake Arena	Tokyo, Japan	
273	Pancrase: Pro Trials for Amateurs	July 21, 2013	Gold's Gym South Tokyo Annex	Tokyo, Japan	
272	Pancrase: 249	July 14, 2013	Azalea Taisho Hall	Osaka, Japan	
271	Pancrase: 248	June 30, 2013	Differ Ariake Arena	Tokyo, Japan	
270	Pancrase: 247	May 19, 2013	Differ Ariake Arena	Tokyo, Japan	
269	Pancrase: Sakaguchi Dojo vs. Pancrase	April 21, 2013	Okinawa City Gymnasium	Okinawa, Japan	
268	Pancrase: 246	March 17, 2013	Differ Ariake Arena	Tokyo, Japan	
267	Pancrase: 245	February 3, 2013	Differ Ariake Arena	Tokyo, Japan	
266	Pancrase: 244	January 12, 2013	Shinjuku Face	Tokyo, Japan	
265	Pancrase: Progress Tour 14	December 1, 2012	Differ Ariake Arena	Tokyo, Japan	
264	Pancrase: Progress Tour 13	November 25, 2012	Azalea Taisho Hall	Osaka, Japan	
263	Pancrase: Progress Tour 12: All Eyes on Yuki Kondo	November 10, 2012	Differ Ariake Arena	Tokyo, Japan	
262	Pancrase: Progress Tour 11	October 6, 2012	Shinjuku Face	Tokyo, Japan	
261	Pancrase: Progress Tour 10	September 1, 2012	Differ Ariake Arena	Tokyo, Japan	
260	Pancrase: Progress Tour 9	August 5, 2012	Differ Ariake Arena	Tokyo, Japan	
259	Pancrase: Gate 10th Chance	July 29, 2012	Gold's Gym South Tokyo Annex	Tokyo, Japan	
258	Pancrase: Progress Tour 8	July 1, 2012	Shinjuku Face	Tokyo, Japan	
257	Pancrase: Progress Tour 7	June 2, 2012	Differ Ariake Arena	Tokyo, Japan	
256	Pancrase: Progress Tour 6	May 20, 2012	Music Town Oto-Ichiba	Okinawa, Japan	
255	Pancrase: Progress Tour 5	April 28, 2012	Differ Ariake Arena	Tokyo, Japan	
254	Pancrase: Progress Tour 4	April 1, 2012	Differ Ariake Arena	Tokyo, Japan	
253	Pancrase: Progress Tour 3	March 11, 2012	Differ Ariake Arena	Tokyo, Japan	
252	Pancrase: Progress Tour 2	March 3, 2012	Azalea Taisho Hall	Osaka, Japan	
251	Pancrase: Progress Tour 1	January 28, 2012	Differ Ariake Arena	Tokyo, Japan	
250	Pancrase: Gate 9th Chance	January 22, 2012	Gold's Gym South Tokyo Annex	Tokyo, Japan	
249	Pancrase: Impressive Tour 13	December 3, 2011	Differ Ariake Arena	Tokyo, Japan	
248	Pancrase: Impressive Tour 12	November 27, 2011	Azalea Taisho Hall	Osaka, Japan	
247	Pancrase: Impressive Tour 11	November 12, 2011	Shinjuku Face	Tokyo, Japan	
246	Pancrase: Impressive Tour 10	October 2, 2011	Differ Ariake Arena	Tokyo, Japan	
245	Pancrase: Impressive Tour 9	September 4, 2011	Differ Ariake Arena	Tokyo, Japan	
244	Pancrase: Impressive Tour 8	August 7, 2011	Differ Ariake Arena	Tokyo, Japan	
243	Pancrase: Impressive Tour 7	July 31, 2011	Azalea Taisho Hall	Osaka, Japan	
242	Pancrase: Impressive Tour 6	July 23, 2011	Shinjuku Face	Tokyo, Japan	
241	Pancrase: Gate 8th Chance	July 10, 2011	Gold's Gym South Tokyo Annex	Tokyo, Japan	
240	Pancrase: Impressive Tour 5	June 5, 2011	Differ Ariake Arena	Tokyo, Japan	
239	Pancrase: Impressive Tour 4	May 3, 2011	Differ Ariake Arena	Tokyo, Japan	
238	Pancrase: Impressive Tour 3	April 3, 2011	Differ Ariake Arena	Tokyo, Japan	
237	Pancrase: Impressive Tour 2	March 13, 2011	Azalea Taisho Hall	Osaka, Japan	
236	Pancrase: Impressive Tour 1	February 6, 2011	Differ Ariake Arena	Tokyo, Japan	
235	Pancrase: Gate 7th Chance	January 30, 2011	Gold's Gym South Tokyo Annex	Tokyo, Japan	
234	Pancrase: Passion Tour 12	December 19, 2010	Azelea Taisho Hall	Osaka, Japan	
233	Pancrase: Passion Tour 11	December 5, 2010	Differ Ariake Arena	Tokyo, Japan	
232	Pancrase: Passion Tour 10	November 3, 2010	Differ Ariake Arena	Tokyo, Japan	
231	Pancrase: Passion Tour 9	October 3, 2010	Differ Ariake Arena	Tokyo, Japan	
230	Pancrase: Gate 6th Chance	September 19, 2010	Gold's Gym South Tokyo Annex	Tokyo, Japan	
229	Pancrase: 2010 Pro-Am Open Catch Wrestling Tournament	September 19, 2010	Gold's Gym South Tokyo Annex	Tokyo, Japan	
228	Pancrase: Passion Tour 8	September 5, 2010	Differ Ariake Arena	Tokyo, Japan	
227	Pancrase: Passion Tour 7	August 8, 2010	Differ Ariake Arena	Tokyo, Japan	
226	Pancrase: Passion Tour 6	July 4, 2010	Differ Ariake Arena	Tokyo, Japan	
225	Pancrase: Passion Tour 5	June 5, 2010	Differ Ariake Arena	Tokyo, Japan	
224	Pancrase: Gate 5th Chance	May 16, 2010	Gold's Gym South Tokyo Annex	Tokyo, Japan	
223	Pancrase: Passion Tour 4	April 29, 2010	Differ Ariake Arena	Tokyo, Japan	
222	Pancrase: Passion Tour 3	April 4, 2010	Differ Ariake Arena	Tokyo, Japan	
221	Pancrase: Passion Tour 2	March 22, 2010	Azelea Taisho Hall	Osaka, Japan	
220	Pancrase: Passion Tour 1	February 7, 2010	Differ Ariake Arena	Tokyo, Japan	
219	Pancrase: Gate 4th Chance	January 10, 2010	Gold's Gym South Tokyo Annex	Tokyo, Japan	
218	Pancrase: Changing Tour 8	December 6, 2009	Differ Ariake Arena	Tokyo, Japan	
217	Pancrase: Changing Tour 7	November 8, 2009	Azelea Taisho Hall	Osaka, Japan	
216	Pancrase: Changing Tour 6	October 25, 2009	Differ Ariake Arena	Tokyo, Japan	
215	Pancrase: Changing Tour 5	October 17, 2009	Shinjuku Face	Tokyo, Japan	
214	Pancrase: Changing Tour 4	August 8, 2009	Differ Ariake Arena	Tokyo, Japan	
213	Pancrase: Pancrase Gate 2009	July 26, 2009	Gold's Gym South Tokyo Annex	Tokyo, Japan	
212	Pancrase: Changing Tour 3	June 7, 2009	Differ Ariake Arena	Tokyo, Japan	
211	Pancrase: Pancrase Gate 2009	May 24, 2009	Gold's Gym South Tokyo Annex	Tokyo, Japan	
210	Pancrase: Changing Tour 2	April 5, 2009	Differ Ariake Arena	Tokyo, Japan	
209	Pancrase: Changing Tour 1	February 1, 2009	Differ Ariake Arena	Tokyo, Japan	
208	Pancrase: Shining 10	December 7, 2008	Differ Ariake Arena	Tokyo, Japan	
207	Pancrase: Shining 9	October 26, 2008	Differ Ariake Arena	Tokyo, Japan	
206	Pancrase: Shining 8	October 1, 2008	Korakuen Hall	Tokyo, Japan	
205	Pancrase: Shining 7	September 7, 2008		Osaka, Japan	
204	Pancrase: Shining 6	August 27, 2008	Korakuen Hall	Tokyo, Japan	
203	Pancrase: Real 2008	June 29, 2008	Tenkaichi Stadium	Okinawa, Japan	
202	Pancrase: Shining 5	June 1, 2008	Korakuen Hall	Tokyo, Japan	
201	Pancrase: Shining 4	May 25, 2008	Azelea Taisho Hall	Osaka, Japan	
200	Pancrase: Shining 3	April 27, 2008	Differ Ariake Arena	Tokyo, Japan	
199	Pancrase: Shining 2	March 26, 2008	Korakuen Hall	Tokyo, Japan	
198	Pancrase: 2008 Neo-Blood Tournament Eliminations	March 23, 2008	Gold's Gym South Tokyo Annex	Tokyo, Japan	
197	Pancrase: Shining 1	January 30, 2008	Korakuen Hall	Tokyo, Japan	
196	Pancrase: Rising 10	December 22, 2007	Differ Ariake Arena	Tokyo, Japan	
195	Pancrase: 2007 Korea Neo-Blood Tournament	December 16, 2007		Busan, South Korea	
194	Pancrase: Rising 9	November 28, 2007	Korakuen Hall	Tokyo, Japan	
193	Pancrase: Hybrid Bout in Utsunomiya 3	October 27, 2007	Utsunomiya City Gymnasium	Utsunomiya, Tochigi, Japan	
192	Pancrase: Rising 8	October 14, 2007	Differ Ariake Arena	Tokyo, Japan	
191	Pancrase: Rising 7	September 30, 2007	Umeda Stella Hall	Osaka, Japan	
190	Pancrase: Rising 6	September 5, 2007	Korakuen Hall	Tokyo, Japan	
189	Pancrase: 2007 Neo-Blood Tournament Finals	July 27, 2007	Korakuen Hall	Tokyo, Japan	
188	Pancrase: Rising 5	May 30, 2007	Korakuen Hall	Tokyo, Japan	
187	Pancrase: 2007 Neo-Blood Tournament Semifinals	May 6, 2007	Gold's Gym South Tokyo Annex	Tokyo, Japan	
186	Pancrase: Rising 4	April 27, 2007	Korakuen Hall	Tokyo, Japan	
185	Pancrase: Real 2007	April 8, 2007	Teruya Diamond Hall	Okinawa, Japan	
184	Pancrase: 2007 Neo-Blood Tournament Eliminations	March 25, 2007	Shinkiba 1st Ring	Tokyo, Japan	
183	Pancrase: Rising 3	March 18, 2007	Korakuen Hall	Tokyo, Japan	
182	Pancrase: Korea Hybrid Challenge	March 11, 2007	Spartan Gym	Geoje, South Gyeongsang, South Korea	
181	Pancrase: Rising 2	February 28, 2007	Korakuen Hall	Tokyo, Japan	
180	Pancrase: Rising 1	February 4, 2007	Umeda Stella Hall	Osaka, Japan	
179	Pancrase: Blow 11	December 10, 2006	Differ Ariake Arena	Tokyo, Japan	
178	Pancrase: Blow 10	December 2, 2006	Differ Ariake Arena	Tokyo, Japan	
177	Pancrase: Blow 9	October 25, 2006	Korakuen Hall	Tokyo, Japan	
176	Pancrase: Blow 8	October 1, 2006	Umeda Stella Hall	Osaka, Japan	
175	Pancrase: Blow 7	September 16, 2006	Differ Ariake Arena	Tokyo, Japan	
174	Pancrase: Blow 6	August 27, 2006	Yokohama Cultural Gymnasium	Yokohama, Kanagawa, Japan	
173	Pancrase: 2006 Neo-Blood Tournament Finals	July 28, 2006	Korakuen Hall	Tokyo, Japan	
172	Pancrase: Blow 5	June 6, 2006	Korakuen Hall	Tokyo, Japan	
171	Pancrase: Blow 4	May 2, 2006	Korakuen Hall	Tokyo, Japan	
170	Pancrase: Blow 3	April 9, 2006	Differ Ariake Arena	Tokyo, Japan	
169	Pancrase: 2006 Neo-Blood Tournament Semifinals	April 2, 2006	Gold's Gym South Tokyo Annex	Tokyo, Japan	
168	Pancrase: Blow 2	March 19, 2006	Umeda Stella Hall	Osaka, Japan	
167	Pancrase: 2006 Neo-Blood Tournament Eliminations	February 19, 2006	Gold's Gym South Tokyo Annex	Tokyo, Japan	
166	Pancrase: Blow 1	January 26, 2006	Korakuen Hall	Tokyo, Japan	
165	Pancrase: Spiral 10	December 4, 2005	Differ Ariake Arena	Tokyo, Japan	
164	Pancrase: Spiral 9	November 4, 2005	Korakuen Hall	Tokyo, Japan	
163	Pancrase: Hybrid Fight 2005	October 23, 2005	Hybrid Wrestling Kagoshima Gym	Izumi, Kagoshima, Japan	
162	Pancrase: Spiral 8	October 2, 2005	Yokohama Cultural Gymnasium	Yokohama, Kanagawa, Japan	
161	Pancrase: Spiral 7	September 4, 2005	Umeda Stella Hall	Osaka, Japan	
160	Pancrase: Z	September 3, 2005	Grand Messe Kumamoto	Kumamoto, Japan	
159	Pancrase: 2005 Neo-Blood Tournament Finals	August 27, 2005	Korakuen Hall	Tokyo, Japan	
158	Pancrase: Hybrid Fight 2005	August 7, 2005	Hybrid Wrestling Kagoshima Gym	Izumi, Kagoshima, Japan	
157	Pancrase: Spiral 6	July 31, 2005	Korakuen Hall	Tokyo, Japan	
156	Pancrase: Spiral 5	July 10, 2005	Yokohama Cultural Gymnasium	Yokohama, Kanagawa, Japan	
155	Pancrase: 2005 Neo-Blood Tournament Semifinals	June 5, 2005	Gold's Gym South Tokyo Annex	Tokyo, Japan	
154	Pancrase: Hybrid Fight 2005	May 22, 2005	Hybrid Wrestling Kagoshima Gym	Izumi, Kagoshima, Japan	
153	Pancrase: Spiral 4	May 1, 2005	Yokohama Cultural Gymnasium	Yokohama, Kanagawa, Japan	
152	Pancrase: Spiral 3	April 10, 2005	Umeda Stella Hall	Osaka, Japan	
151	Pancrase: Spiral 2	March 6, 2005	Yokohama Cultural Gymnasium	Yokohama, Kanagawa, Japan	
150	Pancrase: 2005 Neo-Blood Tournament Eliminations	February 27, 2005	Gold's Gym South Tokyo Annex	Tokyo, Japan	
149	Pancrase: Spiral 1	February 4, 2005	Korakuen Hall	Tokyo, Japan	
148	Pancrase: Brave 12	December 21, 2004	Korakuen Hall	Tokyo, Japan	
147	Pancrase: Brave 11	November 26, 2004	Korakuen Hall	Tokyo, Japan	
146	Pancrase: Hybrid Fight 2004	November 7, 2004	Hybrid Wrestling Kagoshima Gym	Izumi, Kagoshima, Japan	
145	Pancrase: Brave 10	November 7, 2004	Tokyo Bay NK Hall	Urayasu, Chiba, Japan	
144	Pancrase: Brave 9	October 12, 2004	Korakuen Hall	Tokyo, Japan	
143	Pancrase: Brave 8	September 24, 2004	Korakuen Hall	Tokyo, Japan	
142	Pancrase: Brave 7	August 22, 2004	Umeda Stella Hall	Osaka, Japan	
141	Pancrase: 2004 Neo-Blood Tournament Final	July 25, 2004	Korakuen Hall	Tokyo, Japan	
140	Pancrase: 2004 Neo-Blood Tournament Semifinals	July 25, 2004	Korakuen Hall	Tokyo, Japan	
139	Pancrase: Brave 6	June 22, 2004	Korakuen Hall	Tokyo, Japan	
138	Pancrase: Brave 5	May 28, 2004	Korakuen Hall	Tokyo, Japan	
137	Pancrase: 2004 Neo-Blood Tournament Eliminations	May 2, 2004	Gold's Gym South Tokyo Annex	Tokyo, Japan	
136	Pancrase: Brave 4	April 23, 2004	Korakuen Hall	Tokyo, Japan	
135	Pancrase: Brave 3	March 29, 2004	Korakuen Hall	Tokyo, Japan	
134	Pancrase: Brave 2	February 15, 2004	Umeda Stella Hall	Osaka, Japan	
133	Pancrase: Brave 1	February 6, 2004	Korakuen Hall	Tokyo, Japan	
132	Pancrase: Hybrid 11	December 21, 2003	Differ Ariake Arena	Tokyo, Japan	
131	Pancrase: Hybrid 10	November 30, 2003	Ryogoku Kokugikan	Tokyo, Japan	
130	Pancrase: Hybrid 9	October 31, 2003	Korakuen Hall	Tokyo, Japan	
129	Pancrase: Hybrid 8	October 4, 2003	Osaka International Convention Center	Osaka, Japan	
128	Pancrase: 10th Anniversary Show	August 31, 2003	Ryogoku Kokugikan	Tokyo, Japan	
127	Pancrase: 2003 Neo-Blood Tournament Second Round	July 27, 2003	Korakuen Hall	Tokyo, Japan	
126	Pancrase: 2003 Neo-Blood Tournament Opening Round	July 27, 2003	Korakuen Hall	Tokyo, Japan	
125	Pancrase: Hybrid 7	June 22, 2003	Umeda Stella Hall	Osaka, Japan	
124	Pancrase: Hybrid 6	June 7, 2003	Differ Ariake Arena	Tokyo, Japan	
123	Pancrase: Hybrid 5	May 18, 2003	Yokohama Cultural Gymnasium	Yokohama, Kanagawa, Japan	
122	Pancrase: Hybrid 4	April 12, 2003	Korakuen Hall	Tokyo, Japan	
121	Pancrase: Hybrid 3	March 8, 2003	Differ Ariake Arena	Tokyo, Japan	
120	Pancrase: Hybrid 2	February 16, 2003	Osaka International Convention Center	Osaka, Japan	
119	Pancrase: Hybrid 1	January 26, 2003	Korakuen Hall	Tokyo, Japan	
118	Pancrase: Spirit 9	December 21, 2002	Korakuen Hall	Tokyo, Japan	
117	Pancrase: Spirit 8	November 30, 2002	Yokohama Cultural Gymnasium	Yokohama, Kanagawa, Japan	
116	Pancrase: Spirit 7	October 29, 2002	Korakuen Hall	Tokyo, Japan	
115	Pancrase: 2002 Anniversary Show	September 29, 2002	Yokohama Cultural Gymnasium	Yokohama, Kanagawa, Japan	
114	Pancrase: Spirit 6	August 25, 2002	Umeda Stella Hall	Osaka, Japan	
113	Pancrase: 2002 Neo-Blood Tournament Second Round	July 28, 2002	Korakuen Hall	Tokyo, Japan	
112	Pancrase: 2002 Neo-Blood Tournament Opening Round	July 28, 2002	Korakuen Hall	Tokyo, Japan	
111	Pancrase: Spirit 5	May 28, 2002	Korakuen Hall	Tokyo, Japan	
110	Pancrase: Spirit 4	May 11, 2002	Umeda Stella Hall	Yokohama, Kanagawa, Japan	
109	Pancrase: Spirit 3	March 25, 2002	Korakuen Hall	Tokyo, Japan	
108	Pancrase: Spirit 2	February 17, 2002	Umeda Stella Hall	Osaka, Japan	
107	Pancrase: Spirit 1	January 27, 2002	Korakuen Hall	Tokyo, Japan	
106	Pancrase: Proof 7	December 1, 2001	Yokohama Cultural Gymnasium	Yokohama, Kanagawa, Japan	
105	Pancrase: Proof 6	October 30, 2001	Korakuen Hall	Tokyo, Japan	
104	Pancrase: Australia	October 16, 2001		Australia	
103	Pancrase: 2001 Anniversary Show	September 30, 2001	Yokohama Cultural Gymnasium	Yokohama, Kanagawa, Japan	
102	Pancrase: Proof 5	August 25, 2001	Umeda Stella Hall	Osaka, Japan	
101	Pancrase: 2001 Neo-Blood Tournament Second Round	July 29, 2001	Korakuen Hall	Tokyo, Japan	
100	Pancrase: 2001 Neo-Blood Tournament Opening Round	July 29, 2001	Korakuen Hall	Tokyo, Japan	
99	Pancrase: Proof 4	June 26, 2001	Korakuen Hall	Tokyo, Japan	
98	Pancrase: Proof 3	May 13, 2001	Korakuen Hall	Tokyo, Japan	
97	Pancrase: 2001 Neo-Blood Tournament Eliminations	May 5, 2001	Ota City Gymnasium	Tokyo, Japan	
96	Pancrase: Proof 2	March 31, 2001	Namihaya Dome	Kadoma, Osaka, Japan	
95	Pancrase Australia: Hybrid Evolution	February 17, 2001	Clancy Centre	Sydney, Australia	
94	Pancrase: Proof 1	February 4, 2001	Korakuen Hall	Tokyo, Japan	
93	Pancrase: Trans 8	December 9, 2000	Aomori Prefectural Gymnasium	Aomori, Japan	
92	Pancrase: Trans 7	December 4, 2000	Japanese Martial Arts Building	Tokyo, Japan	
91	Pancrase: Pancrase UK	November 25, 2000	York Hall	London, England	
90	Pancrase: Trans 6	October 31, 2000	Korakuen Hall	Tokyo, Japan	
89	Pancrase: 2000 Anniversary Show	September 24, 2000	Yokohama Cultural Gymnasium	Yokohama, Kanagawa, Japan	
88	Pancrase: 2000 Neo-Blood Tournament Second Round	August 27, 2000	Umeda Stella Hall	Osaka, Japan	
87	Pancrase: Trans 5	July 23, 2000	Korakuen Hall	Tokyo, Japan	
86	Pancrase: 2000 Neo-Blood Tournament Opening Round	July 23, 2000	Korakuen Hall	Tokyo, Japan	
85	Pancrase: Australia	July 10, 2000		Australia	
84	Pancrase: Trans 4	June 26, 2000	Korakuen Hall	Tokyo, Japan	
83	Pancrase: Trans 3	April 30, 2000	Yokohama Cultural Gymnasium	Yokohama, Kanagawa, Japan	
82	Pancrase: Trans 2	February 27, 2000	Umeda Stella Hall	Osaka, Japan	
81	Pancrase: Trans 1	January 23, 2000	Korakuen Hall	Tokyo, Japan	
80	Pancrase: Breakthrough 11	December 18, 1999	Yokohama Cultural Gymnasium	Yokohama, Kanagawa, Japan	
79	Pancrase: Breakthrough 10	November 28, 1999	Namihaya Dome	Kadoma, Osaka, Japan	
78	Pancrase: Breakthrough 9	October 25, 1999	Korakuen Hall	Tokyo, Japan	
77	Pancrase: 1999 Anniversary Show	September 18, 1999	Tokyo Bay NK Hall	Uramasu, Chiba, Japan	
76	Pancrase: Breakthrough 8	September 4, 1999	Sendai Spring General Gymnasium	Sendai, Miyagi, Japan	
75	Pancrase: 1999 Neo-Blood Tournament Second Round	August 1, 1999	Korakuen Hall	Tokyo, Japan	
74	Pancrase: 1999 Neo-Blood Tournament Opening Round	August 1, 1999	Korakuen Hall	Tokyo, Japan	
73	Pancrase: Breakthrough 7	July 6, 1999	Korakuen Hall	Tokyo, Japan	
72	Pancrase: Breakthrough 6	June 11, 1999	Korakuen Hall	Tokyo, Japan	
71	Pancrase: Breakthrough 5	May 23, 1999	Chikusa Sport Center	Nagoya, Aichi, Japan	
70	Pancrase: Breakthrough 4	April 18, 1999	Yokohama Cultural Gymnasium	Yokohama, Kanagawa, Japan	
69	Pancrase: Breakthrough 3	March 9, 1999	Korakuen Hall	Tokyo, Japan	
68	Pancrase: Breakthrough 2	February 11, 1999	Umeda Stella Hall	Osaka, Japan	
67	Pancrase: Breakthrough 1	January 19, 1999	Korakuen Hall	Tokyo, Japan	
66	Pancrase: Advance 12	December 19, 1998	Tokyo Bay NK Hall	Urayasu, Chiba, Japan, Japan	
65	Pancrase: Advance 11	November 29, 1998	Umeda Stella Hall	Osaka, Japan	
64	Pancrase: Advance 10	October 26, 1998	Korakuen Hall	Tokyo, Japan	
63	Pancrase: Advance 9	October 4, 1998	Korakuen Hall	Tokyo, Japan	
62	Pancrase: 1998 Anniversary Show	September 14, 1998	Japanese Martial Arts Building	Tokyo, Japan	
61	Pancrase: 1998 Neo-Blood Tournament Second Round	July 26, 1998	Aomori Prefectural Gymnasium	Aomori, Japan	
60	Pancrase: 1998 Neo-Blood Tournament Opening Round	July 7, 1998	Korakuen Hall	Tokyo, Japan	
59	Pancrase: Advance 8	June 21, 1998	Kobe Fashion Mart	Kobe, Hyogo, Japan	
58	Pancrase: Advance 7	June 2, 1998	Korakuen Hall	Tokyo, Japan	
57	Pancrase: Advance 6	May 12, 1998	Korakuen Hall	Tokyo, Japan	
56	Pancrase: Advance 5	April 26, 1998	Yokohama Cultural Gymnasium	Yokohama, Kanagawa, Japan	
55	Pancrase: Advance 4	March 18, 1998	Korakuen Hall	Tokyo, Japan	
54	Pancrase: Advance 3	March 1, 1998	Kobe Fashion Mart	Kobe, Hyogo, Japan	
53	Pancrase: Advance 2	February 6, 1998	Yokohama Cultural Gymnasium	Yokohama, Kanagawa, Japan	
52	Pancrase: Advance 1	January 16, 1998	Korakuen Hall	Tokyo, Japan	
51	Pancrase: Alive 11	December 20, 1997	Yokohama Cultural Gymnasium	Yokohama, Kanagawa, Japan	
50	Pancrase: Alive 10	November 16, 1997	Kobe Fashion Mart	Kobe, Hyogo, Japan	
49	Pancrase: Alive 9	October 29, 1997	Korakuen Hall	Tokyo, Japan	
48	Pancrase: 1997 Anniversary Show	September 6, 1997	Tokyo Bay NK Hall	Urayasu, Chiba, Japan, Japan	
47	Pancrase: Alive 8	August 9, 1997	Umeda Stella Hall	Osaka, Japan	
46	Pancrase: 1997 Neo-Blood Tournament, Round 2	July 20, 1997	Korakuen Hall	Tokyo, Japan	
45	Pancrase: 1997 Neo-Blood Tournament, Round 1	July 20, 1997	Korakuen Hall	Tokyo, Japan	
44	Pancrase: Alive 7	June 30, 1997	Hakata Star Lanes	Hakata-ku, Fukuoka, Japan	
43	Pancrase: Alive 6	June 18, 1997	Korakuen Hall	Tokyo, Japan	
42	Pancrase: Alive 5	May 24, 1997	Kobe Fashion Mart	Kobe, Hyogo, Japan	
41	Pancrase: Alive 4	April 27, 1997	Tokyo Bay NK Hall	Urayasu, Chiba, Japan, Japan	
40	Pancrase: Alive 3	March 22, 1997	Tsuyuhashi Sport Center	Nagoya, Aichi, Japan	
39	Pancrase: Alive 2	February 22, 1997	Tokyo Bay NK Hall	Urayasu, Chiba, Japan, Japan	
38	Pancrase: Alive 1	January 17, 1997	Korakuen Hall	Tokyo, Japan	
37	Pancrase: Truth 10	December 15, 1996	Japanese Martial Arts Building	Tokyo, Japan	
36	Pancrase: Truth 9	November 9, 1996	Kobe Fashion Mart	Kobe, Hyogo, Japan	
35	Pancrase: Truth 8	October 22, 1996	Korakuen Hall	Tokyo, Japan	
34	Pancrase: Truth 7	October 8, 1996	Tsuyuhashi Sport Center	Nagoya, Aichi, Japan	
33	Pancrase: 1996 Anniversary Show	September 7, 1996	Tokyo Bay NK Hall	Urayasu, Chiba, Japan, Japan	
32	Pancrase: 1996 Neo-Blood Tournament, Round 2	July 23, 1996	Korakuen Hall	Tokyo, Japan	
31	Pancrase: 1996 Neo-Blood Tournament, Round 1	July 22, 1996	Korakuen Hall	Tokyo, Japan	
30	Pancrase: Truth 6	June 25, 1996	Fukuoka Convention Center	Hakata-ku, Fukuoka, Japan	
29	Pancrase: Truth 5	May 16, 1996	Nippon Budokan	Tokyo, Japan	
28	Pancrase: Truth 4	April 7, 1996	Korakuen Hall	Tokyo, Japan	
27	Pancrase: Truth 3	April 7, 1996	Korakuen Hall	Tokyo, Japan	
26	Pancrase: Truth 2	March 2, 1996	Kobe Fashion Mart	Kobe, Hyogo, Japan	
25	Pancrase: Truth 1	January 28, 1996	Yokohama Cultural Gymnasium	Yokoahama, Kanagawa, Japan	
24	Pancrase: Eyes of Beast 7	December 14, 1995	Sapporo Nakashima Gymnasium	Sapporo, Hokkaido, Japan	
23	Pancrase: Eyes of Beast 6	November 4, 1995	Yokohama Cultural Gymnasium	Yokohama, Kanagawa, Japan	
22	Pancrase: 1995 Anniversary Show	September 1, 1995	Ryogoku Kokugikan	Tokyo, Japan	
21	Pancrase: 1995 Neo-Blood Tournament Second Round	July 23, 1995	Korakuen Hall	Tokyo, Japan	
20	Pancrase: 1995 Neo-Blood Tournament Opening Round	July 22, 1995	Korakuen Hall	Tokyo, Japan	
19	Pancrase: Eyes of Beast 5	June 13, 1995	Sapporo Nakashima Gymnasium	Sapporo, Hokkaido, Japan	
18	Pancrase: Eyes of Beast 4	May 13, 1995	Tokyo Bay NK Hall	Urayasu, Chiba, Japan	
17	Pancrase: Eyes of Beast 3	April 8, 1995	Aichi Budokan	Nagoya, Aichi, Japan	
16	Pancrase: Eyes of Beast 2	March 10, 1995	Yokohama Cultural Gymnasium	Yokohama, Kanagawa, Japan	
15	Pancrase: Eyes of Beast 1	January 26, 1995	Aichi Budokan	Nagoya, Aichi, Japan	
14	Pancrase: King of Pancrase Tournament Second Round	December 17, 1994	Ryogoku Kokugikan	Tokyo, Japan	
13	Pancrase: King of Pancrase Tournament Opening Round	December 16, 1994	Ryogoku Kokugikan	Tokyo, Japan	
12	Pancrase: Road to the Championship 5	October 15, 1994	Ryogoku Kokugikan	Tokyo, Japan	
11	Pancrase: Road to the Championship 4	September 1, 1994	Osaka Metropolitan Gymnasium	Osaka, Japan	
10	Pancrase: Road to the Championship 3	July 26, 1994	Komazawa Olympic Gymnasium	Tokyo, Japan	
9	Pancrase: Road to the Championship 2	July 6, 1994	Amagasaki Gymnasium	Amagasaki, Hyogo, Japan	
8	Pancrase: Road to the Championship 1	May 31, 1994	Nippon Budokan	Tokyo, Japan	
7	Pancrase: Pancrash! 3	April 21, 1994	Osaka Metropolitan Gymnasium	Osaka, Japan	
6	Pancrase: Pancrash! 2	March 12, 1994	Aichi Budokan	Nagoya, Aichi, Japan	
5	Pancrase: Pancrash! 1	January 19, 1994	Yokohama Cultural Gymnasium	Yokohama, Kanagawa, Japan	
4	Pancrase: Yes, We Are Hybrid Wrestlers 4	December 8, 1993	Hakata Star Lanes	Hakata-ku, Fukuoka, Japan	
3	Pancrase: Yes, We Are Hybrid Wrestlers 3	November 8, 1993	Kobe World Commemoration Hall	Kobe, Hyogo, Japan	
2	Pancrase: Yes, We Are Hybrid Wrestlers 2	October 14, 1993	Tsuyuhashi Sports Center	Nagoya, Aichi, Japan	
1	Pancrase: Yes, We Are Hybrid Wrestlers 1	September 21, 1993	Tokyo Bay NK Hall	Uryasu, Chiba, Japan	

== See also ==
- Pancrase
- List of Pancrase champions
- 1993 in Pancrase
