= 1995 in Pancrase =

Mixed martial arts events

Information
- First date: January 26, 1995
- Last date: December 14, 1995

Events
- Total events: 10

Fights
- Total fights: 70

Chronology
1994 in Pancrase	1995 in Pancrase	1996 in Pancrase

The year 1995 was the third year in the history of Pancrase, a mixed martial arts promotion based in the Japan. In 1995 Pancrase held 10 events beginning with, Pancrase: Eyes of Beast 1.

== Events list ==
#	Event title	Date	Arena	Location
24	Pancrase: Eyes of Beast 7	December 14, 1995	Sapporo Nakashima Gymnasium	Sapporo, Hokkaido, Japan
23	Pancrase: Eyes of Beast 6	November 4, 1995	Yokohama Cultural Gymnasium	Yokohama, Kanagawa, Japan
22	Pancrase: 1995 Anniversary Show	September 1, 1995	Ryogoku Kokugikan	Tokyo, Japan
21	Pancrase: 1995 Neo-Blood Tournament Second Round	July 23, 1995	Korakuen Hall	Tokyo, Japan
20	Pancrase: 1995 Neo-Blood Tournament Opening Round	July 22, 1995	Korakuen Hall	Tokyo, Japan
19	Pancrase: Eyes of Beast 5	June 13, 1995	Sapporo Nakashima Gymnasium	Sapporo, Hokkaido, Japan
18	Pancrase: Eyes of Beast 4	May 13, 1995	Tokyo Bay NK Hall	Urayasu, Chiba, Japan
17	Pancrase: Eyes of Beast 3	April 8, 1995	Aichi Budokan	Nagoya, Aichi, Japan
16	Pancrase: Eyes of Beast 2	March 10, 1995	Yokohama Cultural Gymnasium	Yokohama, Kanagawa, Japan
15	Pancrase: Eyes of Beast 1	January 26, 1995	Aichi Budokan	Nagoya, Aichi, Japan

== Pancrase: Eyes of Beast 1 ==
Pancrase: Eyes of Beast 1
- Date: January 26, 1995
- Venue: The Aichi Budokan
- City: Nagoya, Japan

Pancrase: Eyes of Beast 1 was an event held on January 26, 1995, at The Aichi Budokan in Nagoya, Aichi, Japan.

=== Results ===
Main Card
Weight class				Method	Round	Time	Notes
	Ken Shamrock	def.	Leon Van Dijk	Submission (Heel Hook)	1	4:45
	Bas Rutten	def.	Manabu Yamada	Submission (Arm-Triangle Choke)	1	1:05
	Masakatsu Funaki	def.	Jason DeLucia	Submission (Heel Hook)	1	9:04
	Frank Shamrock	def.	Katsuomi Inagaki	Submission (Rear-Naked Choke)	1	6:14
	Takafumi Ito	def.	Gregory Smit	Submission (Toe Hold)	1	8:47
	Takaku Fuke	def.	Richard Saar	KO (Spinning Backfist)	1	0:23

== Pancrase: Eyes of Beast 2 ==
Pancrase: Eyes of Beast 2
- Date: March 10, 1995
- Venue: Yokohama Cultural Gymnasium
- City: Yokohama, Kanagawa, Japan

Pancrase: Eyes of Beast 2 was an event held on March 10, 1995, at the Yokohama Cultural Gymnasium in Yokohama, Kanagawa, Japan.

=== Results ===
Main Card
Weight class				Method	Round	Time	Notes
	Ken Shamrock	def.	Bas Rutten	Submission (Kneebar)	1	1:01
	Masakatsu Funaki	def.	Frank Shamrock	Submission (Ankle Lock)	1	5:11
	Minoru Suzuki	def.	Gregory Smit	Submission (Rear-Naked Choke)	1	9:10
	Jason DeLucia	def.	Manabu Yamada	TKO (Doctor Stoppage)	1	1:41
	Larry Papadopoulos	def.	Takaku Fuke	Decision (Unanimous)	1	15:00
	Alex Cook	def.	Katsuomi Inagaki	Submission (Heel Hook)	1	9:23
	Scott Bessac	def.	Osami Shibuya	Decision (Lost Points)	1	10:00
	Takafumi Ito	def.	Vernon White	Submission (Armbar)	1	7:26

== Pancrase: Eyes of Beast 3 ==
Pancrase: Eyes of Beast 3
- Date: April 8, 1995
- Venue: Aichi Budokan
- City: Nagoya, Aichi, Japan

Pancrase: Eyes of Beast 3 was an event held on April 8, 1995, at Aichi Budokan in Nagoya, Aichi, Japan.

=== Results ===
Main Card
Weight class				Method	Round	Time	Notes
	Manabu Yamada	def.	Masakatsu Funaki	Submission (Heel Hook)	1	4:43
	Frank Shamrock	def.	Minoru Suzuki	Submission (Rear-Naked Choke)	1	3:23
	Bas Rutten	def.	Takaku Fuke	Submission (Heel Hook)	1	1:52
	Jason DeLucia	def.	John Renfroe	Submission (Heel Hook)	1	1:36
	Vernon White	def.	Larry Papadopoulos	Submission (Heel Hook)	1	9:54
	Osami Shibuya	def.	Gregory Smit	Decision (Unanimous)	1	10:00
	Scott Bessac	def.	Takafumi Ito	Decision (Lost Points)	1	10:00

== Pancrase: Eyes of Beast 4 ==
Pancrase: Eyes of Beast 4
- Date: May 13, 1995
- Venue: Tokyo Bay NK Hall
- City: Urayasu, Chiba, Japan

Pancrase: Eyes of Beast 4 was an event held on May 13, 1995, at Tokyo Bay NK Hall in Urayasu, Chiba, Japan.

=== Results ===
Main Card
Weight class				Method	Round	Time	Notes
	Minoru Suzuki	def.	Ken Shamrock	Submission (Kneebar)	1	2:14
	Bas Rutten	def.	Maurice Smith	Submission (Kneebar)	1	2:10
	Manabu Yamada	def.	Jason DeLucia	Submission (Heel Hook)	1	3:03
	Masakatsu Funaki	def.	Alex Cook	Submission (Heel Hook)	1	7:14
	Takaku Fuke	def.	Gregory Smit	Decision (Lost Points)	1	20:00
	Frank Shamrock	vs.	Allan Goes	Draw (Majority)	1	10:00
	Takafumi Ito	def.	John Renfroe	Submission (Heel Hook)	1	3:08
	Katsuomi Inagaki	def.	Osami Shibuya	Decision (Majority)	1	10:00

== Pancrase: Eyes of Beast 5 ==
Pancrase: Eyes of Beast 5
- Date: June 13, 1995
- Venue: Sapporo Nakashima Gymnasium
- City: Sapporo, Hokkaido, Japan

Pancrase: Eyes of Beast 5 was an event held on June 13, 1995, at Sapporo Nakashima Gymnasium in Sapporo, Hokkaido, Japan.

=== Results ===
Main Card
Weight class				Method	Round	Time	Notes
	Minoru Suzuki	def.	Larry Papadopoulos	Submission (Rear-Naked Choke)	1	8:34
	Frank Shamrock	def.	Takaku Fuke	Submission (Rear-Naked Choke)	1	8:16
	Bas Rutten	def.	Jason DeLucia	Submission (Toe Hold)	1	1:32
	Masakatsu Funaki	def.	Gregory Smit	Submission (Achilles Lock)	1	7:30
	Katsuomi Inagaki	def.	Toon Stelling	DQ (Eye Gouge)	1	17:43
	Manabu Yamada	def.	Vernon White	Submission (Kneebar)	1	10:26
	Takafumi Ito	def.	Osami Shibuya	Decision (Lost Points)	1	10:00

== Pancrase: 1995 Neo-Blood Tournament Opening Round ==
Pancrase: 1995 Neo-Blood Tournament Opening Round
- Date: July 22, 1995
- Venue: Korakuen Hall
- City: Tokyo, Japan

Pancrase: 1995 Neo-Blood Tournament Opening Round was an event held on July 22, 1995, at Korakuen Hall in Tokyo, Japan.

=== Results ===
Main Card
Weight class				Method	Round	Time	Notes
	Minoru Suzuki	def.	Jason Delucia	Submission (Guillotine Choke)	1	9:23
	Ryushi Yanagisawa	def.	Christopher DeWeaver	Submission (Armlock)	1	3:38
	Gregory Smit	def.	Vernon White	Decision (1-0)	1	10:00
	Takafumi Ito	def.	Jeff Masajiri	Submission (Armbar)	1	2:56
	Katsuomi Inagaki	def.	Osami Shibuya	Decision (Unanimous)	1	10:00
	Ken Shamrock	def.	Larry Papadopoulos	Submission (Achilles Lock)	1	2:18

== Pancrase: 1995 Neo-Blood Tournament Second Round ==
Pancrase: 1995 Neo-Blood Tournament Second Round
- Date: July 23, 1995
- Venue: Korakuen Hall
- City: Tokyo, Japan

Pancrase: 1995 Neo-Blood Tournament Second Round was an event held on July 23, 1995, at Korakuen Hall in Tokyo, Japan.

=== Results ===
Main Card
Weight class				Method	Round	Time	Notes
	Takafumi Ito	def.	Ryushi Yanagisawa	Decision (Majority)	1	30:00
	Masakatsu Funaki	def.	Leon van Dijk	Submission (Achilles Lock)	1	1:01
	Bas Rutten	def.	Frank Shamrock	Decision (Split)	1	15:00
	Guy Mezger	def.	John Renfroe	Submission (Armlock)	1	7:25
	Ryushi Yanagisawa	def.	Gregory Smit	Submission (Rear-Naked Choke)	1	7:30
	Takafumi Ito	def.	Katsuomi Inagaki	Decision (Unanimous)	1	20:00

== Pancrase: 1995 Anniversary Show ==
Pancrase: 1995 Anniversary Show
- Date: September 1, 1995
- Venue: Ryogoku Kokugikan
- City: Tokyo, Japan

Pancrase: 1995 Anniversary Show was an event held on September 1, 1995, at Ryogoku Kokugikan in Tokyo, Japan.

=== Results ===
Main Card
Weight class				Method	Round	Time	Notes
	Bas Rutten	def.	Minoru Suzuki	Submission (Guillotine Choke)	1	15:35
	Masakatsu Funaki	def.	Guy Mezger	Submission (Achilles Lock)	1	6:46
	Frank Shamrock	def.	Takafumi Ito	Submission (Rear-Naked Choke)	1	7:23
	Jason DeLucia	def.	Ryushi Yanagisawa	Submission (Triangle Choke)	1	2:25
	Takaku Fuke	def.	Todd Medina	Submission (Armbar)	1	5:30
	Kazuo Takahashi	def.	Osami Shibuya	Submission (Arm-Triangle Choke)	1	5:12
	Larry Papadopoulos	def.	Katsuomi Inagaki	Decision (Lost Points)	1	10:00
	Maurice Smith	def.	Manabu Yamada	KO (Punch)	2	1:46	(Note: Kickboxing bout)

== Pancrase: Eyes of Beast 6 ==
Pancrase: Eyes of Beast 6
- Date: November 4, 1995
- Venue: Yokohama Cultural Gymnasium
- City: Yokohama, Kanagawa, Japan

Pancrase: Eyes of Beast 6 was an event held on November 4, 1995, at Yokohama Cultural Gymnasium in Yokohama, Kanagawa, Japan.

=== Results ===
Main Card
Weight class				Method	Round	Time	Notes
	Bas Rutten	def.	Maurice Smith	Submission (Rear-Naked Choke)	1	4:34
	Frank Shamrock	def.	Masakatsu Funaki	Submission (Toe Hold)	1	10:31
	Jason DeLucia	def.	Takaku Fuke	Decision (Lost Points)	1	30:00
	Minoru Suzuki	def.	Todd Medina	Submission (Armbar)	1	1:39
	Kazuo Takahashi	def.	Scott Bessac	KO (Palm Strikes)	1	2:26
	Ryushi Yanagisawa	vs.	Guy Mezger	Draw (Unanimous)	1	10:00
	Katsuomi Inagaki	def.	Vernon White	Decision (Majority)	1	10:00
	Osami Shibuya	def.	Harout Terzyan	Submission (Toe Hold)	1	2:48

== Pancrase: Eyes of Beast 7 ==
Pancrase: Eyes of Beast 7
- Date: December 14, 1995
- Venue: Sapporo Nakashima Gymnasium
- City: Sapporo, Hokkaido, Japan

Pancrase: Eyes of Beast 7 was an event held on December 14, 1995, at the Sapporo Nakashima Gymnasium in Sapporo, Hokkaido, Japan.

=== Results ===
Main Card
Weight class				Method	Round	Time	Notes
	Bas Rutten	def.	Ryushi Yanagisawa	Submission (Rear-Naked Choke)	1	27:35
	Minoru Suzuki	vs.	Guy Mezger	NC (Accidental Groin Kick)	1	7:15
	Frank Shamrock	def.	Vernon White	Submission (Achilles Lock)	1	5:23
	Ken Shamrock	def.	Katsuomi Inagaki	Submission (Arm-Triangle Choke)	1	3:19
	Masakatsu Funaki	def.	Takaku Fuke	Submission (Guillotine Choke)	1	0:31
	Jason DeLucia	def.	Takafumi Ito	Submission (Rear-Naked Choke)	1	3:49
	Osami Shibuya	def.	Leon van Dijk	Decision (Majority)	1	10:00

== See also ==
- Pancrase
- List of Pancrase champions
- List of Pancrase events
