= King of Pancrase tournament =

Pancrase MMA event in 1994

- Promotion: Pancrase
- Date: December 16 and 17, 1994
- Venue: Sumo Hall
- City: Tokyo, Japan
- Attendance: 11,000 each day

The King of Pancrase tournament was a mixed martial arts event held by Pancrase Hybrid Wrestling. It took place at Sumo Hall in Tokyo, Japan on December 16 and 17, 1994. The event was a 16-man tournament to crown the first ever champion of Pancrase. It featured the opening round and quarterfinals of the tournament on the first day, and the semifinals and finals on the second day.

The tournament was one of the biggest events in mixed martial arts history to that date and featured some of the best fighters in the world at the time, including future Ultimate Fighting Championship (UFC) champions Bas Rutten, Ken Shamrock, Frank Shamrock, and Maurice Smith, and top Japanese fighters Masakatsu Funaki, Minoru Suzuki and Manabu Yamada.

== Background ==
The King of Pancrase tournament was a two-day openweight tournament on December 16 and 17, 1994. The opening round and quarterfinals took place on day 1 and the semifinals and finals took place on day 2. The winner of the tournament would become the first ever "King of Pancrase".

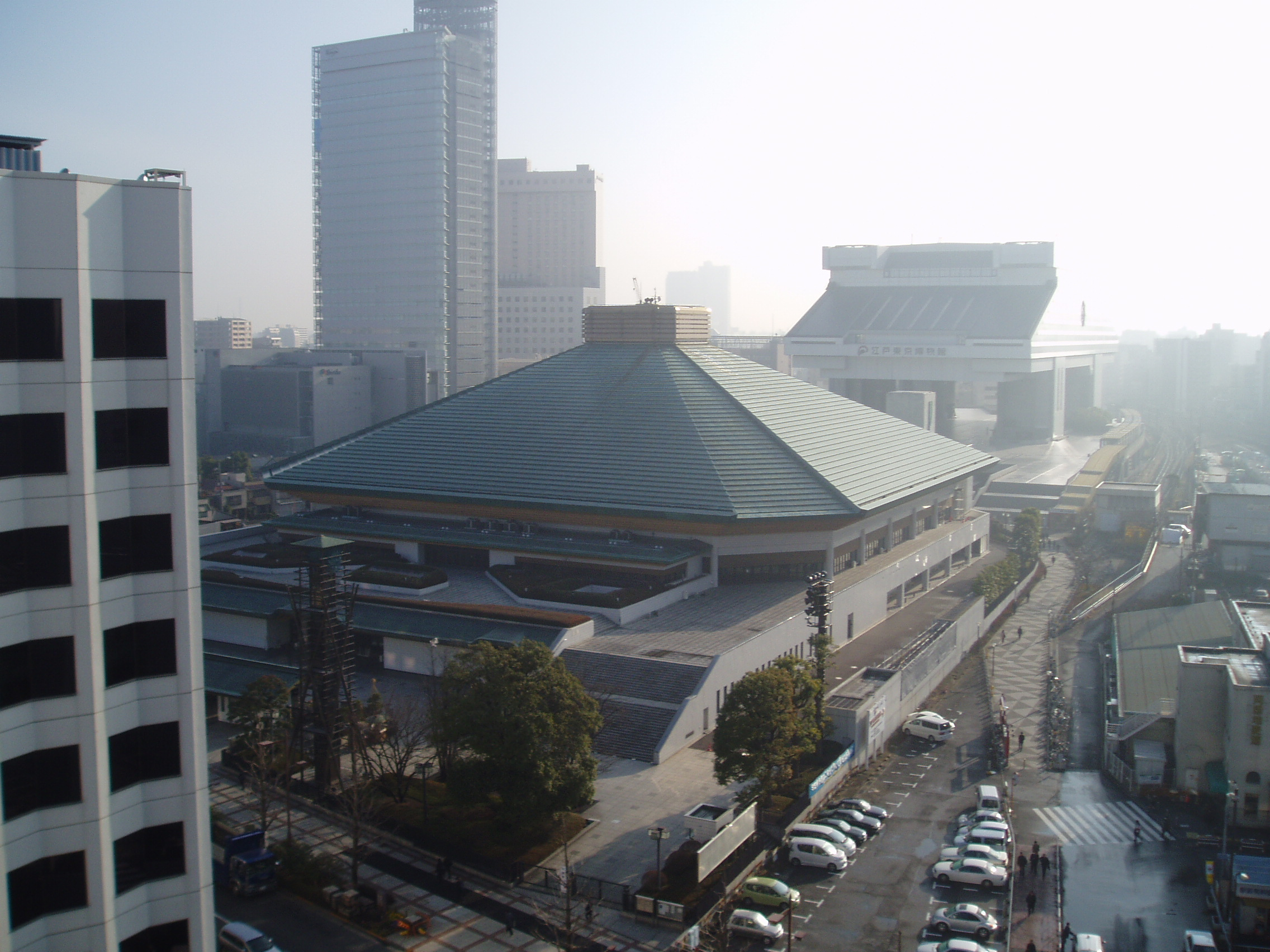
The King of Pancrase Tournament drew 11,000 fans each night at Tokyo's Ryōgoku Kokugikan (also known as Sumo Hall).

== Results ==
The tournament was seeded based on skill, matching #1 seeds with #4 seeds and #2 seeds with #3 seeds in the opening round. The tournament #1 seeds were Minoru Suzuki, Bas Rutten, Ken Shamrock and Masakatsu Funaki. The opening round saw a large upset as Frank Shamrock, who was making his MMA debut, knocked off #1 seed Bas Rutten via Majority Decision.

Masakatsu Funaki, Ken Shamrock, Manabu Yamada and Minoru Suzuki survived day 1 and advanced to day 2. Funaki and Shamrock had fought twice previously, with Shamrock winning once and Funaki winning once. It was also an example of student vs. teacher as Funaki was Shamrock's trainer and mentor and cornered Shamrock for his UFC fights in America.

In addition to the semifinals and finals of the tournament, the day 2 card also included two alternate bouts matching Katsuomi Inagaki vs. Gregory Smit and Scott Bessac vs. Larry Papadopoulos. Results are tabulated,

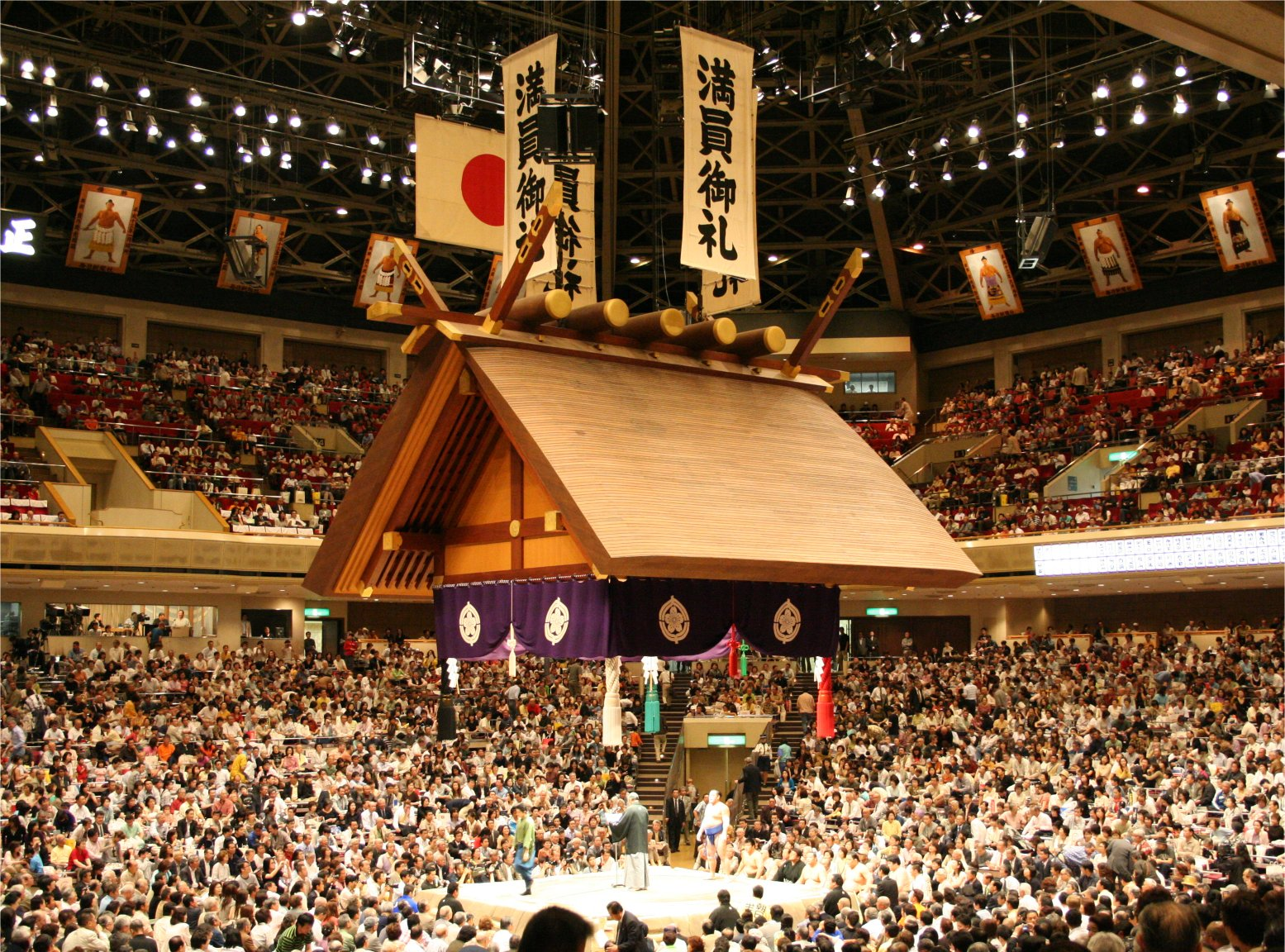
11,000 fans packed Tokyo's Ryōgoku Kokugikan (also known as Sumo Hall) to witness the final round of the King of Pancrase tournament.

=== Day 1 ===
King of Pancrase tournament opening round
Weight class				Method	Round	Time	Notes
	Masakatsu Funaki	def.	Todd Bjornethun	Submission (armbar)	1	2:20
	Vernon White	def.	Leon van Dijk	Submission (heel hook)	1	3:45
	Maurice Smith	def.	Takaku Fuke	KO (knee)	1	2:48
	Ken Shamrock	def.	Alex Cook	Submission (heel hook)	1	1:31
	Frank Shamrock	def.	Bas Rutten	Decision (majority)	1	10:00
	Manabu Yamada	def.	Christopher DeWeaver	Submission (heel hook)	1	2:44
	Jason DeLucia	def.	Thomas Puckett	KO (head kick)	1	0:48
	Minoru Suzuki	def.	Matt Hume	Decision (lost points)	1	10:00
King of Pancrase tournament quarterfinals
	Masakatsu Funaki	def.	Vernon White	Submission (armlock)	1	5:37
	Ken Shamrock	def.	Maurice Smith	Submission (arm-triangle choke)	1	4:23
	Manabu Yamada	def.	Frank Shamrock	Submission (ankle lock)	1	8:38
	Minoru Suzuki	def.	Jason DeLucia	Submission (heel hook)	1	2:04

=== Day 2 ===
King of Pancrase tournament alternate bouts
Weight class				Method	Round	Time	Notes
	Scott Bessac	def.	Larry Papadopoulos	KO (punch to the body)	1	13:49
	Katsuomi Inagaki	def.	Gregory Smit	Submission (heel hook)	1	5:18
King of Pancrase tournament semifinals
	Ken Shamrock	def.	Masakatsu Funaki	Submission (arm-triangle choke)	1	5:50
	Manabu Yamada	def.	Minoru Suzuki	Submission (armbar)	1	14:46
King of Pancrase tournament final
	Ken Shamrock	def.	Manabu Yamada	Decision (unanimous)	1	30:00	(Note: Shamrock became the inaugural Openweight King of Pancrase)

== Tournament bracket ==
Opening round
(Japan)	Minoru Suzuki	DEC
(United States)	Matt Hume	10:00
(United States)	Jason DeLucia	KO
(United States)	Thomas Puckett	0:48
(Japan)	Manabu Yamada	SUB
(Australia)	Christopher DeWeaver	2:44
(United States)	Frank Shamrock	DEC
(Netherlands)	Bas Rutten	10:00
(United States)	Ken Shamrock	SUB
(Australia)	Alex Cook	1:31
(United States)	Maurice Smith	KO
(Japan)	Takaku Fuke	2:48
(United States)	Vernon White	SUB
(Netherlands)	Leon Dijk	3:45
(Japan)	Masakatsu Funaki	SUB
(Netherlands)	Todd Bjornethun	2:20

Quarterfinals
(Japan)	Minoru Suzuki	SUB
(United States)	Jason DeLucia	2:04
(Japan)	Manabu Yamada	SUB
(United States)	Frank Shamrock	8:38
(United States)	Ken Shamrock	SUB
(United States)	Maurice Smith	4:23
(United States)	Vernon White	5:37
(Japan)	Masakatsu Funaki	SUB

Semifinals
(Japan)	Minoru Suzuki	14:46
(Japan)	Manabu Yamada	SUB
(United States)	Ken Shamrock	SUB
(Japan)	Masakatsu Funaki	5:50

Finals
(Japan)	Manabu Yamada	30:00
(United States)	Ken Shamrock	DEC

== See also ==
- Pancrase
- List of Pancrase champions
- List of Pancrase events
- 1994 in Pancrase
