= 1994 in Pancrase =

Mixed martial arts events

Information
- First date: January 19, 1994
- Last date: December 17, 1994

Events
- Total events: 10

Fights
- Total fights: 67
- Title fights: 1

Chronology
1993 in Pancrase	1994 in Pancrase	1995 in Pancrase

The year 1994 was the second year in the history of Pancrase, a mixed martial arts promotion based in the Japan. In 1994 Pancrase held 10 events beginning with, Pancrase: Pancrash! 1.

== Title fights ==
Title fights in 1994
Weight class				Method	Round	Time	Event	Notes
Openweight	Ken Shamrock	def.	Manabu Yamada	Decision (Unanimous)	1	30:00	King of Pancrase tournament second round	(Note: Became the inaugural Pancrase openweight champion.)

== Events list ==
#	Event Title	Date	Arena	Location
14	King of Pancrase tournament second round	December 17, 1994	Ryogoku Kokugikan	Tokyo, Japan
13	King of Pancrase tournament opening round	December 16, 1994	Ryogoku Kokugikan	Tokyo, Japan
12	Pancrase: Road to the Championship 5	October 15, 1994	Ryogoku Kokugikan	Tokyo, Japan
11	Pancrase: Road to the Championship 4	September 1, 1994	Osaka Metropolitan Gymnasium	Osaka, Osaka, Japan
10	Pancrase: Road to the Championship 3	July 26, 1994	Komazawa Olympic Gymnasium	Tokyo, Japan
9	Pancrase: Road to the Championship 2	July 6, 1994	Amagasaki Gymnasium	Amagasaki, Hyogo, Japan
8	Pancrase: Road to the Championship 1	May 31, 1994	Nippon Budokan	Tokyo, Japan
7	Pancrase: Pancrash! 3	April 21, 1994	Osaka Metropolitan Gymnasium	Osaka, Osaka, Japan
6	Pancrase: Pancrash! 2	March 12, 1994	Aichi Budokan	Nagoya, Aichi, Japan
5	Pancrase: Pancrash! 1	January 19, 1994	Yokohama Cultural Gymnasium	Yokohama, Kanagawa, Japan

== Pancrase: Pancrash! 1 ==
Pancrase: Pancrash! 1
- Date: January 19, 1994
- Venue: Yokohama Cultural Gymnasium
- City: Yokohama, Kanagawa, Japan

Pancrase: Pancrash! 1 was an event held on January 19, 1994, at The Yokohama Cultural Gymnasium in Yokohama, Kanagawa, Japan.

=== Background ===
In this event, both Bas Rutten and Ken Shamrock lose, their first loss in Pancrase.

=== Results ===
Main Card
Weight class				Method	Round	Time	Notes
	Minoru Suzuki	def.	Ken Shamrock	Submission (Heel Hook and Kneebar)	1	7:37
	Masakatsu Funaki	def.	Bas Rutten	Submission (Toe Hold)	1	2:58
	Takaku Fuke	def.	Scott Bessac	Submission (Heel Hook)	1	3:04
	Ryushi Yanagisawa	def.	James Mathews	Submission (Armbar)	1	2:58
	Andre Van Den Oetelaar	def.	Vernon White	Submission (Forearm Choke)	1	6:22
	Kazuo Takahashi	def.	Katsuomi Inagaki	Submission (Rear-Naked Choke)	1	5:41

== Pancrase: Pancrash! 2 ==
Pancrase: Pancrash! 2
- Date: March 12, 1994
- Venue: Aichi Budokan
- City: Nagoya, Aichi, Japan

Pancrase: Pancrash! 2 was an event held on March 12, 1994, at Aichi Budokan in Nagoya, Aichi, Japan.

=== Results ===
Main Card
Weight class				Method	Round	Time	Notes
	Minoru Suzuki	def.	Takaku Fuke	Submission (Rear-Naked Choke)	1	6:31
	Masakatsu Funaki	def.	Vernon White	KO (Knee to Body)	1	1:13
	Andre Van Den Oetelaar	def.	Scott Bessac	Submission (Guillotine Choke)	1	3:50
	Ryushi Yanagisawa	def.	Todd Bjornethun	Submission (Heel Hook)	1	7:12
	Katsuomi Inagaki	def.	James Mathews	Submission (Heel Hook)	1	2:27

== Pancrase: Pancrash! 3 ==
Pancrase: Pancrash! 3
- Date: April 21, 1994
- Venue: Osaka Metropolitan Gymnasium
- City: Osaka, Osaka, Japan

Pancrase: Pancrash! 3 was an event held on April 21, 1994, at Osaka Metropolitan Gymnasium in Osaka, Osaka, Japan.

=== Results ===
Main Card
Weight class				Method	Round	Time	Notes
	Minoru Suzuki	def.	Thomas Puckett	Submission (Armbar)	1	1:43
	Masakatsu Funaki	def.	Takaku Fuke	Submission (Rear-Naked Choke)	1	6:55
	Ken Shamrock	def.	Ryushi Yanagisawa	Submission (Heel Hook)	1	7:30
	Bas Rutten	def.	Vernon White	Submission (Guillotine Choke)	1	1:16
	Katsuomi Inagaki	def.	Matt Hume	Decision (Lost Points)	1	30:00
	Toon Stelling	def.	Scott Bessac	Technical Submission (Guillotine Choke)	1	0:40
	Kazuo Takahashi	def.	Andre Van Den Oetelaar	Decision (Lost Points)	1	30:00

== Pancrase: Road to the Championship 1 ==
Pancrase: Road to the Championship 1
- Date: May 31, 1994
- Venue: Nippon Budokan
- City: Tokyo, Japan

Pancrase: Road to the Championship 1 was an event held on May 31, 1994, at Nippon Budokan in Tokyo, Japan.

=== Suzuki v Smith ===
In the second meeting between Maurice Smith and Minoru Suzuki, both men wore close fisted gloves in the first round. However this was not a kickboxing match as their first had been. This match had the standard Pancrase rule set except for shortened round times and the unique glove rule. In the second round both men fought with no gloves. In the third round they again fought with gloves, where Suzuki won with an armbar. Both men laid in the ring for several minutes after the bout.

=== Results ===
Main Card
Weight class				Method	Round	Time	Notes
	Masakatsu Funaki	def.	Gregory Smit	Submission (Rear-Naked Choke)	1	1:58
	Minoru Suzuki	def.	Maurice Smith	Submission (Armbar)	3	0:36
	Frank Lobman	def.	Ken Shamrock	TKO (Leg Kick)	2		(Note: This was a kickboxing match.)
	Takaku Fuke	def.	Toon Stelling	DQ (Illegal Soccer Kick)	1	4:37
	Matt Hume	def.	Scott Bessac	Submission (Rear-Naked Choke)	1	1:21
	Bas Rutten	def.	Kazuo Takahashi	TKO (Knee Injury)	1	1:37	(Note: perhaps due to the injuries sustained in this match Takahashi would not fight again for a year)
	Manabu Yamada	def.	Katsuomi Inagaki	Submission (Kneebar)	1	2:04

== Pancrase: Road to the Championship 2 ==
Pancrase: Road to the Championship 2
- Date: July 6, 1994
- Venue: The Amagasaki Gymnasium
- City: Amagasaki, Hyogo, Japan

Pancrase: Road to the Championship 2 was an event held on July 6, 1994, at The Amagasaki Gymnasium in Amagasaki, Hyogo, Japan.

=== Results ===
Main Card
Weight class				Method	Round	Time	Notes
	Jason Delucia	def.	Masakatsu Funaki	Submission (Kneebar)	1	1:01
	Bas Rutten	def.	Minoru Suzuki	KO (Knee to the Body)	1	3:43
	Takaku Fuke	def.	Gregory Smit	Submission (Ankle Lock)	1	3:46
	Ken Shamrock	def.	Matt Hume	Submission (Kimura)	1	5:50
	Manabu Yamada	def.	Andre Van Den Oetelaar	TKO (Doctor Stoppage)	1	4:52
	Remco Pardoel	def.	Vernon White	TKO (Lost Points)	1	14:24

== Pancrase: Road to the Championship 3 ==
Pancrase: Road to the Championship 3
- Date: July 26, 1994
- Venue: The Komazawa Olympic Gymnasium
- City: Tokyo, Japan

Pancrase: Road to the Championship 3 was an event held on July 26, 1994, at The Komazawa Olympic Gymnasium in Tokyo, Japan.

=== Results ===
Main Card
Weight class				Method	Round	Time	Notes
	Ken Shamrock	def.	Bas Rutten	Submission (Rear-Naked Choke)	1	16:42
	Takaku Fuke	def.	Jason DeLucia	Submission (Heel Hook)	1	4:00
	Masakatsu Funaki	def.	Scott Sollivan	Submission (Heel Hook)	1	0:56
	Minoru Suzuki	def.	Remco Pardoel	KO (Palm Strikes)	1	7:16
	Manabu Yamada	def.	Matt Hume	Submission (Heel Hook)	1	2:31
	Todd Bjornethun	def.	Gregory Smit	Decision (Unanimous)	1	15:00
	Vernon White	def.	Katsuomi Inagaki	Submission (Heel Hook)	1	4:15

== Pancrase: Road to the Championship 4 ==
Pancrase: Road to the Championship 4
- Date: September 1, 1994
- Venue: The Osaka Metropolitan Gymnasium
- City: Osaka, Japan

Pancrase: Road To The Championship 4 was an event held on September 1, 1994, at The Osaka Metropolitan Gymnasium in Osaka, Osaka, Japan.

=== Results ===
Main Card
Weight class				Method	Round	Time	Notes
	Masakatsu Funaki	def.	Ken Shamrock	Submission (Rear-Naked Choke)	1	2:30
	Takaku Fuke	def.	Manabu Yamada	Submission (Heel Hook)	1	13:47
	Minoru Suzuki	def.	Todd Bjornethun	Submission (Armbar)	1	3:11
	Jason DeLucia	def.	Matt Hume	Decision (Lost Points)	1	15:00
	Vernon White	def.	Richard Saar	KO (Palm Strikes)	1	3:25
	Gregory Smit	def.	Katsuomi Inagaki	Decision (Lost Points)	1	15:00

== Pancrase: Road to the Championship 5 ==
Pancrase: Road to the Championship 5
- Date: October 15, 1994
- Venue: Ryogoku Kokugikan
- City: Tokyo, Japan

Pancrase: Road to the Championship 5 was an event held on October 15, 1994, at Ryogoku Kokugikan in Tokyo, Japan.

=== Results ===
Main Card
Weight class				Method	Round	Time	Notes
	Masakatsu Funaki	def.	Minoru Suzuki	Technical Submission (Rear-Naked Choke)	1	1:51
	Ken Shamrock	def.	Takaku Fuke	Submission (Rear-Naked Choke)	1	3:13
	Bas Rutten	def.	Jason DeLucia	Submission (Guillotine Choke)	1	1:43
	Manabu Yamada	def.	Alex Cook	Submission (Armbar)	1	2:27
	Todd Bjornethun	def.	Vernon White	Decision (Lost Points)	1	15:00
	Matt Hume	def.	Scott Sollivan	Submission (Armbar)	1	0:38

== King of Pancrase tournament Opening Round ==
King of Pancrase tournament Opening Round was an event held on December 16, 1994, at Ryogoku Kokugikan in Tokyo, Japan.

=== Results ===
Main Card
Weight class				Method	Round	Time	Notes
	Masakatsu Funaki	def.	Vernon White	Submission (Armlock)	1	5:37
	Ken Shamrock	def.	Maurice Smith	Submission (Arm-Triangle Choke)	1	4:23
	Manabu Yamada	def.	Frank Shamrock	Submission (Ankle Lock)	1	8:38
	Minoru Suzuki	def.	Jason DeLucia	Submission (Heel Hook)	1	2:04
	Masakatsu Funaki	def.	Todd Bjornethun	Submission (Armbar)	1	2:20
	Vernon White	def.	Leon van Dijk	Submission (Heel Hook)	1	3:45
	Maurice Smith	def.	Takaku Fuke	KO (Knee)	1	2:48
	Ken Shamrock	def.	Alex Cook	Submission (Heel Hook)	1	1:31
	Frank Shamrock	def.	Bas Rutten	Decision (Majority)	1	10:00
	Manabu Yamada	def.	Christopher DeWeaver	Submission (Heel Hook)	1	2:44
	Jason DeLucia	def.	Thomas Puckett	KO (Head Kick)	1	0:48
	Minoru Suzuki	def.	Matt Hume	Decision (Lost Points)	1	10:00

== King of Pancrase tournament Second Round ==
King of Pancrase tournament Second Round was an event held on December 17, 1994, at Ryogoku Kokugikan in Tokyo, Japan.

=== Results ===
Main Card
Weight class				Method	Round	Time	Notes
	Ken Shamrock	def.	Manabu Yamada	Decision (Unanimous)	1	30:00	(Note: Shamrock defeated Yamada to become the inaugural Pancrase Openweight Champion.)
	Ken Shamrock	def.	Masakatsu Funaki	Submission (Arm-Triangle Choke)	1	5:50
	Manabu Yamada	def.	Minoru Suzuki	Submission (Armbar)	1	14:46
	Scott Bessac	def.	Larry Papadopoulos	KO (Punch to the Body)	1	13:49
	Katsuomi Inagaki	def.	Gregory Smit	Submission (Heel Hook)	1	5:18

== See also ==
- Pancrase
- List of Pancrase champions
- List of Pancrase events
