= Jason DeLucia =

American mixed martial arts fighter

- Born: July 24, 1969 (age 57); Bellingham, Massachusetts, U.S.
- Height: 5 ft 11 in (1.80 m)
- Weight: 190 lb (86 kg)
- Division: Light heavyweight
- Style: Kung Fu, Karate, Shootfighting, Aikido, Muay Thai, Taekwondo, Judo
- Stance: Southpaw
- Fighting out of: Bellingham, Massachusetts, U.S.
- Team: Lion's Den; Pancrase Hybrid Budokan
- Rank: Black Belt in Aikido; Red Sash in Kung Fu; Certified instructor in Pancrase Hybrid Wrestling
- Years active: 1993-2001, 2003-2006

Mixed martial arts record
- Total: 55
- Wins: 33
- By knockout: 7
- By submission: 13
- By decision: 13
- Losses: 21
- By knockout: 6
- By submission: 13
- By decision: 2
- Draws: 1

Other information
- Mixed martial arts record from Sherdog

Jason DeLucia (born July 24, 1969) is an American retired mixed martial artist and a pioneer of the early mixed martial arts scene. He competed in the Ultimate Fighting Championship (UFC), Pancrase, and Cage Rage during a career that began in the formative years of modern MMA.

DeLucia entered the inaugural UFC events representing Five Animals Kung Fu, and was one of the competitors at UFC 1, where he served as a reserve fighter and defeated Trent Jenkins in the alternate bout before the main tournament, marking the first match in UFC's history. He subsequently entered the UFC 2 tournament, before losing to Royce Gracie by submission. DeLucia later joined Pancrase in Japan, where he became a prominent competitor and faced many of the leading fighters of the era, including Ken Shamrock, Masakatsu Funaki, Bas Rutten, and Minoru Suzuki. He continued competing internationally for more than a decade, with later appearances in the UFC and Cage Rage Championships.

== Mixed Martial Arts career ==
DeLucia began training in martial arts at an early age, developing a background in karate, aikido, Taekwondo and Five Animals Kung Fu, which became his singnature style. In 1992, he drove from Massachusetts to Los Angeles with the intention of answering an open challenge issued by martial artist and actor Steven Seagal published on Black Belt magazine. After the challenge did not materialize, DeLucia learned of the Gracie Challenge and contacted Rorion Gracie, eventually facing Royce Gracie at the Gracie Academy in Torrance, California, in an unsactioned bout. The fight between Royce and DeLucia would later be in one of the Gracie in Action tapes, which inspired the Ultimate Fighting Championship. The experience exposed DeLucia to Brazilian jiu-jitsu and prompted him to begin developing his grappling skills.

DeLucia was invited to UFC 1 by Rorion Gracie as an alternate after his earlier encounter with the family. He was matched against kenpo practitioner Trent Jenkins, a preliminary contest held before the eight-man tournament to determine the tournament's reserve fighter. DeLucia defeated Jenkins by rear-naked choke in 52 seconds. Because none of the tournament competitors withdrew, DeLucia did not enter the main tournament. The bout aired live on pay-per-view but was omitted from the later commercial VHS release, contributing to its later obscurity.

DeLucia returned for UFC 2, now part of the main tournament. On the round of 16, he defeated Wing Chun practitioner Scott Baker, defeating him by submission to strikes from a mounted position after 6:41. He then met Royce Gracie for a rematch at quarter-finals, where he was defeated by an armbar. After DeLucia tapped out, Gracie did not let go of the armbar and the commentator claimed that his elbow had "popped a capsule". However, DeLucia denied this in a Sherdog.com forum, saying it was just badly bent.

After UFC 2, DeLucia met Ken Shamrock and his father Bob Shamrock at the backstage. They were scouting fighters for Pancrase, and DeLucia was invited to train at the Lion's Den. DeLucia recalled that Ken took him to his house, where he lived and trained while preparing for his first Pancrase fight.

DeLucia debuted at Pancrase against its co-founder Masakatsu Funaki, winning by submission to kneebar. He went on to compete in the King of Pancrase tournament in December 1994, one of the first major international MMA tournaments outside the UFC and a showcase for many of the leading fighters of the sport's early era. He defeated Thomas Puckett in the opening round before losing to Minoru Suzuki in the second round. He went on to face many of the organization's leading fighters, including Ken Shamrock, Bas Rutten, Minoru Suzuki, Guy Mezger, Frank Shamrock, and Manabu Yamada, establishing himself as a prominent competitor during Pancrase's formative years. Including three bouts with Rutten, two victories over Ikuhisa Minowa, and a win over Matt Hume. His rivalry with MMA legend Bas Rutten was particularly notable, with DeLucia once suffered a ruptured liver againt Rutten at Pancrase: Truth 6 on June 25, 1996.

He briefly returned to the UFC at UFC 23, losing to Joe Sleek by TKO.

DeLucia continued competing in Pancrase after his UFC return in 1999, fighting regularly through 2000 and 2001. His final Pancrase bout came on September 30, 2001, when he lost to Katsuhisa Fujii by referee stoppage due to a knee injury during the first round. DeLucia subsequently returned to competition in 2003, defeating Matt Rogers by rear-naked choke in an MMA event promoted by Shootboxing. He later competed in Cage Rage in 2006, defeated by Fábio Piamonte via triangle armbar at Cage Rage 15, and made his final professional appearance that year, losing to Lance Everson at WFL 4.

== Post-fight career ==
Following his retirement, DeLucia became increasingly critical of the evolution of mixed martial arts, particularly the widespread use of ground-and-pound. He argued that prolonged ground fighting and strikes from the top position detracted from the submission-focused style of early MMA, which he associated with the rules and philosophy of early Pancrase. DeLucia said he had largely stopped watching modern MMA because of his dislike of ground-and-pound and advocated for rules that would limit the amount of time fighters could remain on the ground while placing greater emphasis on throws and submissions.

During his time in Japan, DeLucia also trained in Pancrase's "Hybrid Wrestling" system and became a certified instructor, later establishing himself as a captain of the Pancrase Hybrid Budokan. He became a promoter of "Hybrid Fighting", a system he developed with Eric Kearns that combined traditional martial arts with elements of modern mixed martial arts. The system emphasized technical competition and safety, deliberately excluding the ground-and-pound techniques that DeLucia had come to criticize in modern MMA.

== Championships and Accomplishments ==
- Pancrase Hybrid Wrestling
  - 1996 King of Pancrase Championship Tournament Runner-Up
- Ultimate Fighting Championship
  - Fought the first fight in UFC History

== Mixed martial arts record ==
Professional record breakdown
55 matches	33 wins	21 losses
By knockout	7	6
By submission	13	13
By decision	13	2
Draws	1	

Res.	Record	Opponent	Method	Event	Date	Round	Time	Location	Notes
Loss	33–21–1	Lance Everson	TKO (punches)	WFL: Calloway Cup 4	November 27, 2006	1	N/A	Revere, Massachusetts, United States	
Loss	33–20–1	Fabio Piamonte	Submission (triangle armbar)	Cage Rage 15	February 4, 2006	1	1:04	London, England	
Win	33–19–1	Matt Rogers	Submission (rear naked choke)	SB 1: Shootbox 1	August 23, 2003	1	2:39	Orlando, Florida, United States	
Loss	32–19–1	Katsuhisa Fujii	TKO (knee injury)	Pancrase - 2001 Anniversary Show	September 30, 2001	1	5:00	Yokohama, Japan	
Loss	32–18–1	Yuki Sasaki	Submission (armbar)	Pancrase - 2001 Neo-Blood Tournament Opening Round	July 29, 2001	2	3:05	Tokyo, Japan	
Loss	32–17–1	Daisuke Ishii	Decision (unanimous)	Pancrase - Proof 4	June 26, 2001	3	5:00	Tokyo, Japan	
Draw	32–16–1	Katsuhisa Fujii	Draw (unanimous)	Pancrase - Trans 7	December 4, 2000	1	15:00	Tokyo, Japan	
Win	32–16	Takaichi Hirayama	Decision (unanimous)	Pancrase - Trans 6	October 31, 2000	1	10:00	Tokyo, Japan	
Loss	31–16	Omar Bouiche	Submission (armbar)	Pancrase - Trans 4	June 26, 2000	1	2:18	Tokyo, Japan	
Loss	31–15	Bob Stines	TKO (punches)	Pancrase - Trans 3	April 30, 2000	1	0:32	Yokohama, Japan	
Loss	31–14	Joe Slick	TKO (knee injury)	UFC 23	November 19, 1999	1	1:12	Tokyo, Japan	
Win	31–13	Manabu Yamada	Decision (unanimous)	Pancrase - 1999 Neo-Blood Tournament Second Round	August 1, 1999	1	15:00	Tokyo, Japan	
Win	30–13	Chris Lytle	Decision (majority)	Pancrase - Breakthrough 7	July 6, 1999	1	10:00	Tokyo, Japan	
Win	29–13	Ikuhisa Minowa	Decision (unanimous)	Pancrase - Breakthrough 6	June 11, 1999	1	10:00	Tokyo, Japan	
Win	28–13	Ryushi Yanagisawa	Decision (majority)	Pancrase - Breakthrough 5	May 23, 1999	1	15:00	Nagoya, Japan	
Win	27–13	Kiuma Kunioku	Decision (lost points)	Pancrase - Breakthrough 1	January 19, 1999	1	15:00	Tokyo, Japan	
Win	26–13	Manabu Yamada	Submission (armbar)	Pancrase: Advance 12	December 19, 1998	1	1:13	Chiba, Japan	
Loss	25–13	Keiichiro Yamamiya	Decision (lost points)	Pancrase: Advance 10	December 16, 1998	1	15:00	Tokyo, Japan	
Win	25–12	Satoshi Hasegawa	Decision (majority)	Pancrase: 1998 Anniversary Show	September 14, 1998	1	10:00	Tokyo, Japan	
Win	24–12	Satoshi Hasegawa	Technical Submission (straight armbar)	Pancrase: Advance 7	June 2, 1998	1	6:14	Tokyo, Japan	
Loss	23–12	Ryushi Yanagisawa	Submission (toe hold)	Pancrase: Advance 5	April 26, 1998	1	12:44	Yokohama, Japan	
Win	23–11	Satoshi Hasegawa	TKO (doctor stoppage)	Pancrase: Advance 3	March 1, 1998	1	0:55	Kobe, Japan	
Win	22–11	Takafumi Ito	Decision (lost points)	Pancrase: Advance 1	January 16, 1998	1	10:00	Tokyo, Japan	
Win	21–11	Ikuhisa Minowa	Submission (ezekiel choke)	Pancrase: Alive 11	December 10, 1997	1	3:47	Yokohama, Japan	
Loss	20–11	Yuki Kondo	Submission (toe hold)	Pancrase: 1997 Anniversary Show	September 6, 1997	1	27:22	Chiba, Japan	For the Pancrase Openweight Championship.
Win	20–10	Kiuma Kunioku	TKO (doctor stoppage)	Pancrase: Alive 6	June 18, 1997	1	18:51	Tokyo, Japan	
Win	19–10	Kazuo Takahashi	Submission (armbar)	Pancrase: Alive 5	May 24, 1997	1	5:13	Kobe, Japan	
Win	18–10	Takafumi Ito	Submission (rear-naked choke)	Pancrase: Alive 4	April 27, 1997	1	4:54	Chiba, Japan	
Loss	17–10	Masakatsu Funaki	TKO (leg injury)	Pancrase - Truth 10	December 15, 1996	1	7:49	Tokyo, Japan	For the vacant Pancrase Openweight Championship.
Win	17–9	Osami Shibuya	Submission (rear-naked choke)	Pancrase - Truth 9	November 9, 1996	1	11:45	Kobe, Japan	
Win	16–9	Yuki Kondo	Decision (lost points)	Pancrase - Truth 7	October 8, 1996	1	20:00	Nagoya, Japan	
Win	15–9	Minoru Suzuki	KO (palm strike)	Pancrase - 1996 Anniversary Show	September 7, 1996	1	4:58	Chiba, Japan	
Loss	14–9	Bas Rutten	KO (punch to the body)	Pancrase - Truth 6	June 25, 1996	1	4:56	Fukuoka, Japan	
Win	14–8	Osami Shibuya	Decision (lost points)	Pancrase - Truth 5	May 16, 1996	1	15:00	Tokyo, Japan	
Win	13–8	Kiuma Kunioku	Decision (lost points)	Pancrase - Truth 4	April 8, 1996	1	15:00	Tokyo, Japan	
Win	12–8	Kazuo Takahashi	TKO (side kick)	Pancrase - Truth 2	March 2, 1996	1	3:37	Kobe, Japan	
Win	11–8	Katsuomi Inagaki	Submission (arm-triangle choke)	Pancrase - Truth 1	January 28, 1996	1	4:56	Yokohama, Japan	
Win	10–8	Takafumi Ito	Submission (rear-naked choke)	Pancrase - Eyes Of Beast 7	December 14, 1995	1	3:49	Sapporo, Japan	
Win	9–8	Takaku Fuke	Decision (lost points)	Pancrase - Eyes Of Beast 6	November 4, 1995	1	30:00	Yokohama, Japan	
Win	8–8	Ryushi Yanagisawa	Submission (triangle choke)	Pancrase - 1995 Anniversary Show	September 1, 1995	1	2:25	Tokyo, Japan	
Loss	7–8	Minoru Suzuki	Submission (guillotine choke)	Pancrase - 1995 Neo-Blood Tournament Opening Round	July 22, 1995	1	9:23	Tokyo, Japan	
Loss	7–7	Bas Rutten	Submission (toe hold)	Pancrase - Eyes Of Beast 5	June 13, 1995	1	1:32	Sapporo, Japan	
Loss	7–6	Manabu Yamada	Submission (heelhook)	Pancrase - Eyes Of Beast 4	May 13, 1995	1	3:03	Chiba, Japan	
Win	7–5	John Renfroe	Submission (heel hook)	Pancrase - Eyes Of Beast 3	April 8, 1995	1	1:36	Nagoya, Japan	
Win	6–5	Manabu Yamada	TKO (doctor stoppage)	Pancrase - Eyes Of Beast 2	March 10, 1995	1	1:41	Nagoya, Japan	
Loss	5–5	Masakatsu Funaki	Submission (inverted heel hook)	Pancrase - Eyes Of Beast 1	January 26, 1995	1	9:04	Nagoya, Japan	
Loss	5–4	Minoru Suzuki	Submission (heel hook)	King of Pancrase tournament opening round	December 16, 1994	1	2:04	Tokyo, Japan	
Win	5–3	Thomas Puckett	KO (head kick)	King of Pancrase tournament opening round	December 16, 1994	1	0:48	Tokyo, Japan	
Loss	4–3	Bas Rutten	Submission (guillotine choke)	Pancrase - Road To The Championship 5	October 15, 1994	1	1:43	Tokyo, Japan	
Win	4–2	Matt Hume	Decision (lost points)	Pancrase - Road To The Championship 4	September 1, 1994	1	15:00	Osaka, Japan	
Loss	3–2	Takaku Fuke	Submission (inverted heel hook)	Pancrase - Road To The Championship 3	July 26, 1994	1	4:00	Tokyo, Japan	
Win	3–1	Masakatsu Funaki	Submission (kneebar)	Pancrase - Road To The Championship 2	July 6, 1994	1	1:01	Amagasaki, Hyogo, Japan	
Loss	2–1	Royce Gracie	Submission (armbar)	UFC 2	March 11, 1994	1	1:07	Denver, Colorado, United States	
Win	2–0	Scott Baker	TKO (submission to punches)	UFC 2	March 11, 1994	1	6:41	Denver, Colorado, United States	
Win	1–0	Trent Jenkins	Submission (rear naked choke)	UFC 1	November 12, 1993	1	0:52	Denver, Colorado, United States	

== Kickboxing record ==
Kickboxing record
0 wins (0 KOs), 1 loss
Date	Result	Opponent	Event	Location	Method	Round	Time	Record
February 11, 2001	Loss	(United States) Sergei Gur	Seikendo: SWA Ultimate Boxing	Tokyo, Japan	TKO (punch)	2	12:57	0-1
Legend: Win Loss Draw/No contest

== Submission grappling record ==
KO PUNCHES

Result	Opponent	Method	Event	Date	Round	Time	Notes
Win	(Japan) Minoru Suzuki	Submission (triangle choke)	Pancrase: Proof 1	February 4, 2001	1	2:49	
