= Manabu Yamada =

Japanese martial artist

- Born: May 18, 1969 (age 57); Tochigi, Japan
- Other names: "Oyabun" ("Kingpin")
- Nationality: Japanese
- Height: 5 ft 9 in (1.75 m)
- Weight: 225 lb (102 kg; 16 st 1 lb)
- Style: Shooto, Brazilian Jiu-Jitsu, Karate, Jeet Kune Do
- Trainer: Satoru Sayama
- Rank: Black Belt in Karate
- Years active: 1990–2000 (MMA)

Kickboxing record
- Total: 1
- Losses: 1
- By knockout: 1

Mixed martial arts record
- Total: 45
- Wins: 23
- By knockout: 3
- By submission: 19
- By decision: 1
- Losses: 16
- By knockout: 4
- By submission: 9
- By decision: 3
- Draws: 6

Other information
- Mixed martial arts record from Sherdog

Manabu Yamada (山田学, born May 18, 1969, in Tochigi, Japan) is a retired Japanese mixed martial arts fighter. He is best known for his participation in Shooto and Pancrase fighting organizations. On December 17, 1994, Yamada advanced to the finals of the King of Pancrase Tournament where he lost to Ken Shamrock via unanimous decision.

== Career ==
Yamada started training with Satoru Sayama at the Super Tiger Gym after a background in karate, debuting in Shooto in 1990. He faced Kenji Kawaguchi twice in matches for the Shooto Middleweight Championship, but he was submitted in both occasions. After two important wins over Kazuhiro Kusayanagi and Naoki Sakurada, he left Shooto and joined Pancrase in 1993.

Manabu had his Pancrase debut against Katsuomi Inagaki, winning rapidly by submission. Shortly after, he got his first big win over Andre Van Den Oetelaar, a kickboxer and Dutch judo champion who sported a large weight advantage. Yamada lost points early due to a rear naked choke and a liver shot, but he came back knocking down Oetelaar with a high kick and then cutting him with a strike, winning the fight by doctor stoppage. Afterwards, Yamada suffered his first defeat in the promotion when he was caught in a heel hook by Takaku Fuke, despite having the points advantage for most of the match.

In December 1994, Yamada took part in the tournament for the first King of Pancrase championship. He eliminated Christopher DeWeaver in two minutes, moving forward to face rising star Frank Shamrock. Despite his opponent's superior strength and late comeback, Yamada caught him in an ankle hold early in the match and resisted all his submission attempts, which gave him the victory by points at the end.

The former Shooto fighter advanced to engage his biggest challenge to the point, the Pancrase co-founder and heavy favourite Minoru Suzuki. In the beginning of a classic fight, Yamada was taken down and had his back fastly taken, but his defensive acumen allowed him to avoid being submitted, and he stole a point from Suzuki with a scrambling rear naked choke. Minoru came back strong, getting several near-holds, but Manabu kept defending and seeking for openings, which granted him another point by ankle hold. He then overpowered Suzuki and controlled him until locked an armbar from side control, making Suzuki tap out for one of his biggest career wins.

The same night, Yamada came again to fight Ken Shamrock in the finals, giving another impressive exhibition by going to the distance with the much stronger Shamrock after 30:00. Yamada again resisted his opponent's grip while turtled up, threatening him with Kimura locks and rolling leglocks from the position, and he even threw a pro wrestling dropkick at the end of the bout, but he lost by decision at the end, with Shamrock being declared King of Pancrase.

Yamada's next match saw an upset when he was submitted by Bas Rutten. Despite his top control, Yamada was trapped in an arm triangle choke and was rendered unconscious due to his refusal to tap out. Manabu lost a match against Jason DeLucia by accidental eye gouge, but he got his course back defeating Pancrase founder Masakatsu Funaki and DeLucia in a revenge match. However, it would be short-lived, as Yamada dropped from main competition, losing to submission to DeLucia in only 1:13 and just getting an important win over Kiuma Kunioku.

Yamada retired in January 2000, after losing to Yuki Kondo, and currently works as MMA trainer and seitai teacher.

== Championships and accomplishments ==
- Pancrase Hybrid Wrestling
  - 1994 King of Pancrase tournament Runner Up
- Tokyo Sports
  - Rookie of the Year (1994)

== Mixed martial arts record ==
Professional record breakdown
45 matches	23 wins	16 losses
By knockout	3	4
By submission	19	9
By decision	1	3
Draws	6	

Res.	Record	Opponent	Method	Event	Date	Round	Time	Location	Notes
Loss	23–15–6	Yuki Kondo	Decision (unanimous)	Pancrase - Trans 1	January 23, 2000	1	10:00	Tokyo, Japan	
Draw	23–15–6	Osami Shibuya	Draw	Pancrase - Breakthrough 10	November 28, 1999	1	30:00	Osaka, Japan	
Win	23–15–5	Tae Yoon Han	Submission (armbar)	Pancrase - Breakthrough 8	September 4, 1999	1	0:48	Sendai, Japan	
Loss	22–15–5	Jason DeLucia	Decision (unanimous)	Pancrase - 1999 Neo-Blood Tournament Second Round	August 1, 1999	1	15:00	Tokyo, Japan	
Win	22–14–5	Leon Dijk	Decision (majority)	Pancrase - Breakthrough 5	May 23, 1999	1	10:00	Nagoya, Japan	
Draw	21–14–5	Ryushi Yanagisawa	Draw	Pancrase - Breakthrough 3	March 9, 1999	1	15:00	Tokyo, Japan	
Win	21–14–4	David Moore	Technical Submission (guillotine choke)	Pancrase - Breakthrough 1	January 19, 1999	1	0:20	Tokyo, Japan	
Loss	20–13–4	Jason DeLucia	Submission (armbar)	Pancrase - Advance 12	December 19, 1998	1	1:13	Urayasu, Japan	
Win	20–13–4	Daisuke Watanabe	Submission (rear-naked choke)	Pancrase - Advance 10	October 26, 1998	1	7:33	Tokyo, Japan	
Draw	19–13–4	Katsuomi Inagaki	Draw	Pancrase - 1998 Anniversary Show	September 14, 1998	2	3:00	Tokyo, Japan	
Loss	19–12–3	Bas Rutten	Submission (ankle lock)	Pancrase - Truth 7	October 8, 1996	1	0:54	Nagoya, Japan	
Win	19–12–3	Kiuma Kunioku	Submission (guillotine choke)	Pancrase - 1996 Anniversary Show	September 7, 1996	1	8:29	Urayasu, Japan	
Loss	18–11–3	Frank Shamrock	Submission (rear-naked choke)	Pancrase - 1996 Neo-Blood Tournament, Round 1	July 22, 1996	1	12:44	Tokyo, Japan	
Draw	18–11–3	Kazuo Takahashi	Draw	Pancrase - Truth 6	June 25, 1996	1	10:00	Fukuoka, Japan	
Loss	18–10–2	Semmy Schilt	Submission (rear-naked choke)	Pancrase - Truth 5	May 16, 1996	1	5:44	Tokyo, Japan	
Loss	18–9–2	Guy Mezger	TKO (doctor stoppage)	Pancrase - Truth 3	April 7, 1996	1	6:14	Tokyo, Japan	
Win	18–8–2	Leon Dijk	Submission (ankle lock)	Pancrase - Truth 3	April 7, 1996	1	2:53	Tokyo, Japan	
Win	17–8–2	Vernon White	Submission (heel hook)	Pancrase - Eyes Of Beast 5	June 13, 1995	1	10:26	Sapporo, Japan	
Win	16–8–2	Jason DeLucia	Submission (heel hook)	Pancrase - Eyes Of Beast 4	May 13, 1995	1	3:03	Urayasu, Japan	
Win	15–8–2	Masakatsu Funaki	Submission (heel hook)	Pancrase - Eyes Of Beast 3	April 8, 1995	1	4:43	Nagoya, Aichi, Japan	
Loss	14–8–2	Jason DeLucia	TKO (doctor stoppage)	Pancrase - Eyes Of Beast 2	March 10, 1995	1	1:41	Yokohama, Japan	
Loss	14–7–2	Bas Rutten	Technical Submission (arm-triangle choke)	Pancrase - Eyes Of Beast 1	January 6, 1995	1	1:05	Nagoya, Japan	
Loss	14–6–2	Ken Shamrock	Decision (unanimous)	King of Pancrase tournament second round	December 17, 1994	1	30:00	Tokyo, Japan	For the inaugural Pancrase Openweight Championship.
Win	14–5–2	Minoru Suzuki	Submission (armbar)	King of Pancrase tournament second round	December 17, 1994	1	14:46	Tokyo, Japan	
Win	13–5–2	Frank Shamrock	Submission (ankle lock)	King of Pancrase tournament opening round	December 16, 1994	1	8:38	Tokyo, Japan	
Win	12–5–2	Christopher DeWeaver	Submission (heel hook)	King of Pancrase tournament opening round	December 16, 1994	1	2:44	Tokyo, Japan	
Win	11–5–2	Alex Cook	Submission (armbar)	Pancrase - Road To The Championship 5	October 15, 1994	1	2:27	Tokyo, Japan	
Loss	10–5–2	Takaku Fuke	Submission (heel hook)	Pancrase - Road To The Championship 4	September 1, 1994	1	13:47	Osaka, Japan	
Win	10–4–2	Matt Hume	Submission (heel hook)	Pancrase - Road To The Championship 3	July 26, 1994	1	2:31	Tokyo, Japan	
Win	9–4–2	Andre Van Den Oetelaar	TKO (doctor stoppage)	Pancrase - Road To The Championship 2	July 6, 1994	1	4:52	Amagasaki, Japan	
Win	8–4–2	Katsuomi Inagaki	Submission (kneebar)	Pancrase - Road To The Championship 1	May 31, 1994	1	2:04	Tokyo, Japan	
Win	7–4–2	Chad Stahelski	Submission (kneebar)	Shooto - Shooto	June 24, 1993	1	2:08	Tokyo, Japan	
Win	6–4–2	Naoki Sakurada	Submission (kneebar)	Shooto - Shooto	February 26, 1993	5	1:09	Tokyo, Japan	
Win	5–4–2	Kazuhiro Kusayanagi	Submission (armbar)	Shooto - Shooto	November 27, 1992	1	1:05	Tokyo, Japan	
Loss	4–4–2	Kenji Kawaguchi	Submission (kneebar)	Shooto - Shooto	July 23, 1992	1	0:36	Tokyo, Japan	For the Shooto Middleweight Championship.
Win	4–3–2	Satoshi Honma	Submission (armbar)	Shooto - Shooto	March 27, 1992	1	N/A	Tokyo, Japan	
Win	3–3–2	Yutaka Fuji	Submission (kneebar)	Shooto - Shooto	December 23, 1991	1	1:39	Tokyo, Japan	
Loss	2–3–2	Satoshi Honma	Submission (armbar)	Shooto - Shooto	August 3, 1991	4	N/A	Tokyo, Japan	
Loss	2–2–2	Kenji Kawaguchi	Submission (kneebar)	Shooto - Shooto	May 31, 1991	1	0:58	Tokyo, Japan	For the inaugural Shooto Middleweight Championship.
Loss	2–1–2	Yasuto Sekishima	KO (punch)	Shooto - Shooto	January 13, 1991	2	N/A	Tokyo, Japan	
Win	2–0–2	Yoshimasa Ishikawa	TKO (punches)	Shooto - Shooto	September 8, 1990	1	2:07	Tokyo, Japan	
Win	1–0–2	Tomonori Ohara	KO (punch)	Shooto - Shooto	July 7, 1990	1	N/A	Tokyo, Japan	
Draw	0–0–2	Takashi Ishizaki	Draw	Shooto - Shooto	May 12, 1990	3	3:00	Tokyo, Japan	
Draw	0–0–1	Takashi Tojo	Draw	Shooto - Shooto	March 17, 1990	3	3:00	Tokyo, Japan	

=== Mixed martial arts exhibition record ===
Exhibition record breakdown		
0 matches	0 wins	0 losses
By knockout	0	0
By submission	0	0
By decision	0	0

Res.	Record	Opponent	Method	Event	Date	Round	Time	Location	Notes
Draw	0–0–2	Noboru Asahi	Technical Draw	Pancrase - Proof 3	May 13, 2001	1	5:00	Tokyo, Japan	
Draw	0–0–1	Sanae Kikuta	Technical Draw	DEEP 2001	January 8, 2001	1	3:00	Tokyo, Japan	

== Kickboxing record ==
Kickboxing record
0 Wins, 1 Loss
Date	Result	Opponent	Event	Location	Method	Round	Time	Record
1995-09-01	Loss	(United States) Maurice Smith	Pancrase: 1995 Anniversary Show	Tokyo, Japan	KO (punch)	2	1:46	
