= Alex Cook (fighter) =

Australian MMA fighter (born 1973)

- Born: 2 May 1973 (age 53); Australia
- Nationality: Australian
- Height: 5 ft 7 in (1.70 m)
- Weight: 162 lb (73 kg; 11.6 st)
- Division: Welterweight
- Years active: 1994 - 2004

Other information
- Mixed martial arts record from Sherdog

Alex Cook (born 2 May 1973) is a retired Australian mixed martial artist.

Cook is a veteran of the Shooto and Pancrase organizations, making his debut in 1994 to a loss to Manabu Yamada at Pancrase: Road To The Championship 5. After frequent losses to Ken Shamrock and Masakatsu Funaki, Cook would later jump to Shooto with fellow Australian fighter and trainer Larry Papadopoulos with better success such as a win over Jutaro Nakao. He compiled a 4-2 record during his time in Shooto and would later depart the organization in 2000.

== Mixed martial arts record ==
Professional record breakdown
| 11 matches | 6 wins | 5 losses |
| By knockout | 2 | 0 |
| By submission | 4 | 4 |
| By decision | 0 | 1 |

| Res. | Record | Opponent | Method | Event | Date | Round | Time | Location | Notes |
|---|---|---|---|---|---|---|---|---|---|
| Win | 6-5 | Alessandro Custodio | TKO (submission to punches) | SRF 12: Spartan Reality Fight 12 | 27 November 2004 | 2 | 1:00 | Gold Coast, Australia | |
| Win | 5-5 | Ray Cooper | Submission (neck crank) | Shooto: R.E.A.D. Final | 17 December 2000 | 1 | 1:44 | Urayasu, Chiba, Japan | |
| Win | 4-5 | Isao Tanimura | KO (punches) | Shooto: R.E.A.D. 5 | 22 May 2000 | 1 | 1:27 | Tokyo, Japan | |
| Loss | 3-5 | Tetsuji Kato | Decision (unanimous) | Shooto: Las Grandes Viajes 5 | 29 August 1998 | 3 | 5:00 | Tokyo, Japan | |
| Loss | 3-4 | Hayato Sakurai | Submission (rear naked choke) | Shooto: Reconquista 4 | 12 October 1997 | 1 | 1:09 | Tokyo, Japan | |
| Win | 3-3 | Jutaro Nakao | Submission (rear-naked choke) | Shooto: Let's Get Lost | 4 October 1996 | 2 | 1:50 | Tokyo, Japan | |
| Win | 2-3 | Tomoaki Hayama | Technical Submission (arm-triangle choke) | VTJ 1996: Vale Tudo Japan 1996 | 7 July 1996 | 2 | 6:23 | Tokyo, Japan | Welterweight. |
| Loss | 1-3 | Masakatsu Funaki | Submission (heel hook) | Pancrase: Eyes Of Beast 4 | 13 May 1995 | 1 | 7:14 | Tokyo, Japan | |
| Win | 1-2 | Katsuomi Inagaki | Submission (heel hook) | Pancrase: Eyes Of Beast 2 | 10 March 1995 | 1 | 9:23 | Yokohama, Kanagawa, Japan | |
| Loss | 0-2 | Ken Shamrock | Submission (heel hook) | King of Pancrase tournament opening round | 16 December 1994 | 1 | 1:31 | Tokyo, Japan | |
| Loss | 0-1 | Manabu Yamada | Submission (armbar) | Pancrase: Road To The Championship 5 | 15 October 1994 | 1 | 2:27 | Tokyo, Japan | |

== See also ==
- List of male mixed martial artists
