= Matt Hume =

American martial artist

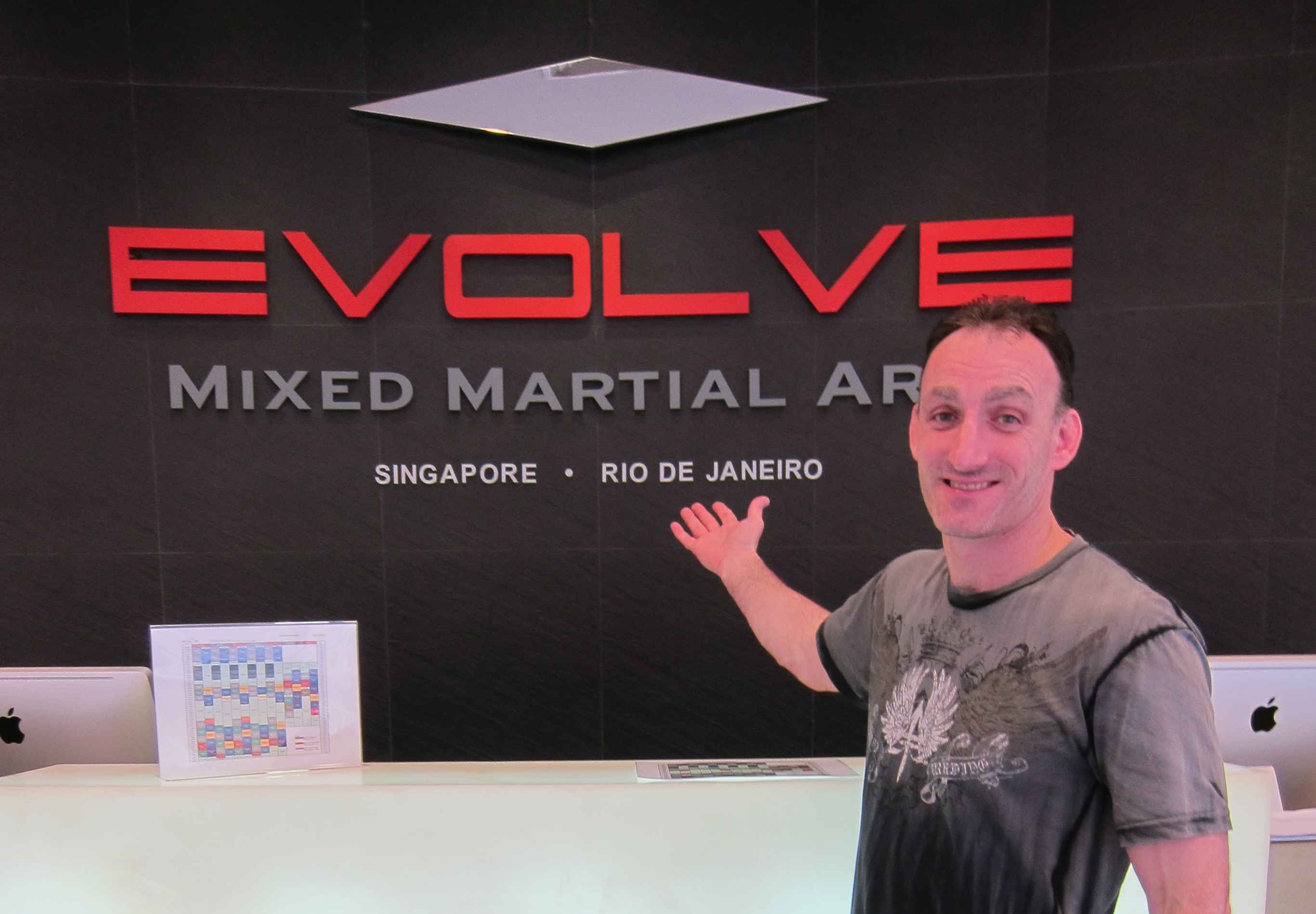
- Hume at Evolve MMA in Singapore, 2011
- Born: July 14, 1966 (age 60)
- Other names: The Wizard
- Nationality: American
- Height: 5 ft 10 in (178 cm)
- Weight: 185 lb (84 kg; 13 st 3 lb)
- Fighting out of: Kirkland, Washington, U.S.
- Team: AMC Pankration
- Trainer: Richard Hume (father), Bill Spurr, Terry Higbee, Doug Chappel, Haru Shimanishi, Maurice Smith
- Wrestling: NCAA Division II Wrestling
- Years active: 1994–2002 (MMA)

Mixed martial arts record
- Total: 10
- Wins: 5
- By knockout: 2
- By submission: 3
- Losses: 5
- By submission: 2
- By decision: 3

Other information
- Occupation: Vice President of Operations at ONE, head trainer at AMC Pankration
- University: Central Washington University
- Mixed martial arts record from Sherdog

Matt Hume (born July 14, 1966) is an American former professional mixed martial artist, trainer, and businessman. He is the co-founder and head trainer at AMC Pankration in Kirkland, WA. Hume and his AMC team have trained several champions and world-class fighters including Josh Barnett, Demetrious Johnson, Bibiano Fernandes, Tim Boetsch, Jeff Monson, Bob Sapp, Chris Leben, Hayato Sakurai, Akira Shoji, Matt Brown, Rich Franklin, and Caros Fodor. Hume has been the Senior Vice President of Competition for Singapore-based combat sports promotion ONE Championship since 2012.

== Background ==
Hume grew up in Kirkland, Washington. His father was a Seattle police officer and his mother was a housewife and later a nurse. His father had trained under Bruce Lee and began Matt's judo and boxing training at age four. Hume began folkstyle wrestling in elementary school and started coaching after graduating from Lake Washington High School. He coached Josh Barnett during Barnett's time in high school, which eventually led to Barnett's MMA career. Hume attended Highline College for one year and finished his degree at Central Washington University. He credited his Highline wrestling coach Ron Wallick as being a major influence. While attending CWU in 1988, Hume started a pankration club, inviting all wrestlers, boxers, and other martial artists to train. He originally learned about pankration as a child while attending wrestling camps hosted by Athletes in Action. This encouraged him to train and compete in wrestling, boxing, kickboxing, Thai boxing, and karate. After graduating, Hume worked in finance while training with Haru Shimanishi and Maurice Smith. Shimanishi had already established AMC (American Martial Arts Centre) Kickboxing, and partnered with Hume to co-found AMC Pankration. His relationship with Smith brought interest from Japanese reporters and Pancrase, who recruited Hume and many other AMC fighters.

== Mixed martial arts career ==
Hume's competitive MMA career started in the shootfighting organization Pancrase, debuting at Pancrash 3! against Katsuomi Inagaki, losing by points. He won his second fight against veteran and future UFC fighter Scott Bessac via rear naked choke, but lost his next 3 fights against Ken Shamrock, Manabu Yamada, and Jason Delucia. Hume rebounded by submitting Scott Sollivan with an armbar in under a minute, but lost against Minoru Suzuki by points in his final Pancrase fight. He later cited Shamrock, Suzuki, and Masakatsu Funaki as influences on his career.

After Pancrase, Hume fought in Extreme Fighting, defeating Shooto champion Erik Paulson and former UFC Welterweight Champion Pat Miletich. His last fight was at Absolute FC, where he submitted Shawn Peters in under two minutes.

Since retiring from active competition, Hume has remained active as the head coach at AMC, working with a range of students from world champions to hobbyist adults and children.

== Submission wrestling career ==
Hume made his professional debut in submission wrestling on October 11, 1997 at The Contenders, an event that pitted submission grapplers against amateur wrestlers. He faced Olympic wrestling gold medalist Kenny Monday, winning via submission in under a minute.

On March 20, 1998, Hume competed at the inaugural ADCC Submission Fighting World Championships. He defeated Micah Pittman and Luis Brito but withdrew due to injury before facing John Lewis.

== Executive positions ==
In 1993, Hume founded United Full Contact Federation in order to sanction amateur pankration events. UFCF was instrumental in legalizing MMA in Washington state. After conflicts with the state's boxing commission, the boxing commission was dissolved and UFCF worked with the Department of Licensing to sanction, codify, and legislate the sport. UFCF would also hold professional events from 1995 to 2007, several of them at the AMC gym.

Hume was the rule director and official trainer to both PRIDE Fighting Championships and Dream.

Hume was initially appointed as the head official by Singapore-based promotion ONE Championship when it was founded in 2011. The following year he accepted a new role as Vice President of Operations.

== Mixed martial arts record ==
Professional record breakdown
10 matches	5 wins	5 losses
By knockout	2	0
By submission	3	2
By decision	0	3

Res.	Record	Opponent	Method	Event	Date	Round	Time	Location	Notes
Win	5–5	Shawn Peters	Submission (armbar)	HOOKnSHOOT: Absolute FC 1	December 13, 2002	1	1:45	Fort Lauderdale, Florida, United States	
Win	4–5	Pat Miletich	TKO (nose injury)	Extreme Fighting 4	March 28, 1997	1	5:00	Des Moines, Iowa, United States	
Win	3–5	Erik Paulson	TKO (doctor stoppage)	Extreme Fighting 3	October 18, 1996	3	0:44	Tulsa, Oklahoma, United States	
Loss	2–5	Minoru Suzuki	Decision (lost points)	King of Pancrase tournament	December 16, 1994	1	10:00	Tokyo, Japan	
Win	2–4	Scott Sollivan	Submission (armbar)	Pancrase - Road To The Championship 5	October 15, 1994	1	0:38	Tokyo, Japan	
Loss	1–4	Jason DeLucia	Decision (lost points)	Pancrase - Road To The Championship 4	September 1, 1994	1	15:00	Osaka, Japan	
Loss	1–3	Manabu Yamada	Submission (heel hook)	Pancrase - Road To The Championship 3	July 26, 1994	1	2:31	Osaka, Japan	
Loss	1–2	Ken Shamrock	Submission (kimura)	Pancrase - Road To The Championship 2	July 6, 1994	1	5:50	Hyogo, Japan	
Win	1–1	Scott Bessac	Submission (rear-naked choke)	Pancrase - Road To The Championship 1	May 31, 1994	1	1:21	Tokyo, Japan	
Loss	0–1	Katsuomi Inagaki	Decision (lost points)	Pancrase - Pancrash! 3	April 21, 1994	1	30:00	Osaka, Japan	

== Submission grappling record ==
Result	Opponent	Method	Event	Date	Round	Time	Notes
Win	(Brazil) Luis Brito	Points	ADCC -77 kg	1998	1	10:00	Subsequently withdrew due to injury.
Win	(United States) Micah Pittman	Submission	ADCC -77 kg	1998	1	5:34	
Win	(United States) Kenny Monday	Submission (toe hold)	The Contenders	1997	1	0:45	
