= Tokyo Bay NK Hall =

Former Indoor sporting area in Urayasu, Chiba Prefecture, Japan

Coordinates: 35°37′36.30″N 139°52′30.88″E

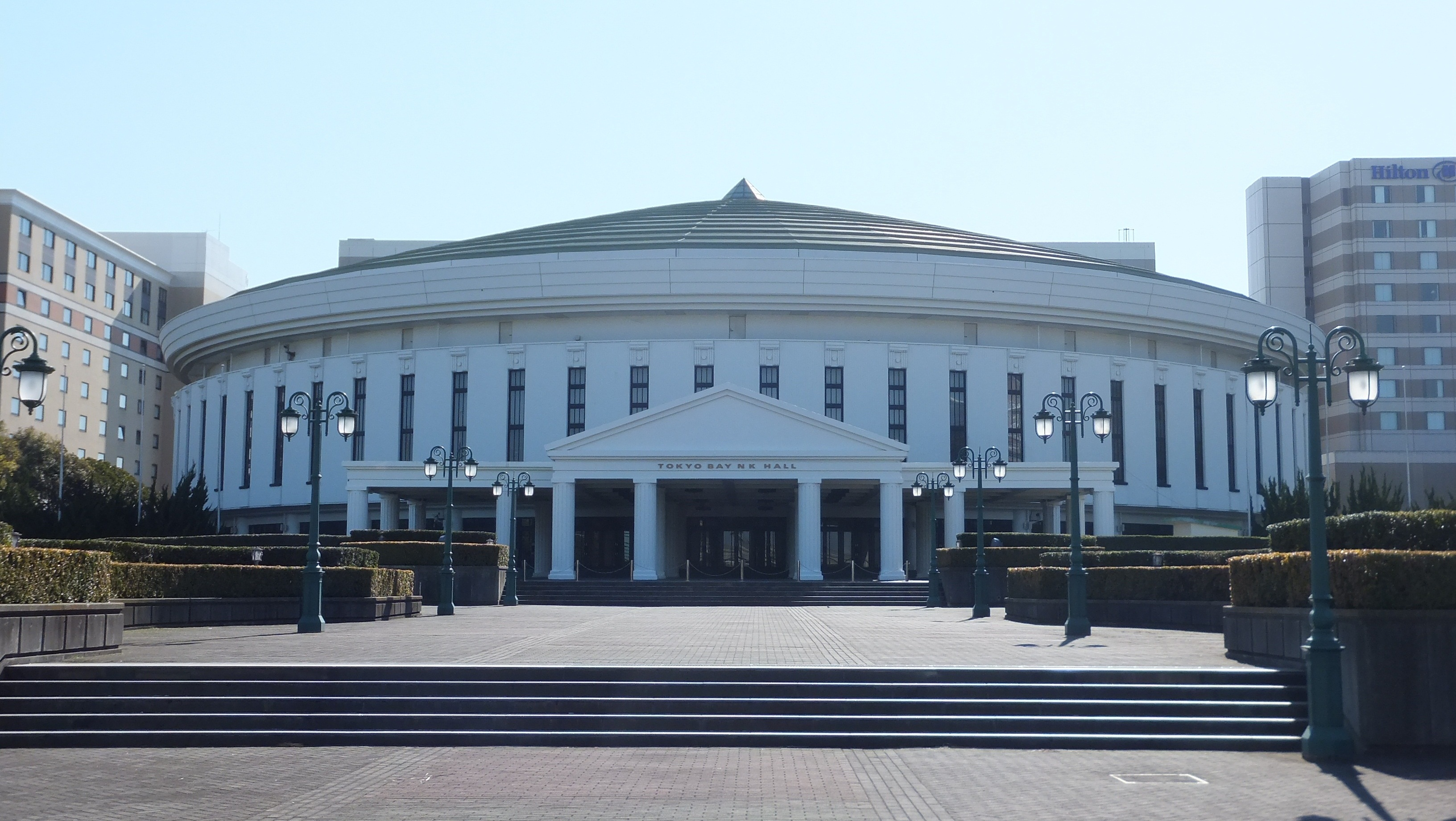
- Interactive map of Tokyo Bay NK Hall
- Location: Urayasu, Chiba, Japan
- Owner: The Dai-ichi Mutual Life Insurance Company
- Capacity: 7,000

Construction
- Groundbreaking: 1986
- Opened: 1988
- Closed: 2005
- Demolished: 2015

Tokyo Bay NK Hall was an indoor sporting arena located at the Tokyo Disney Resort in Urayasu, Chiba, in Japan. It opened in 1988, closed in 2005 and was demolished in 2015 to make way for Toy Story Hotel. The capacity of the arena was 7,000 people. It hosted local sporting events and concerts that required a smaller facility than Ariake Coliseum.

On 3 November 1996, the venue hosted the George Foreman vs. Crawford Grimsley boxing match, where Foreman would earn a victory after 12 rounds.

== Past major events ==
- 1993 Japan Music Awards on November 16, 1993.
- Venue for the UFC 23 event.
- Held the first ever SASUKE competition in 1997.

Events and tenants
Preceded by Lake Charles Civic Center	Ultimate Fighting Championship venue UFC 23	Succeeded by Lake Charles Civic Center
