= 1997 in Pancrase =

Mixed martial arts events

Information
- First date: January 17, 1997
- Last date: December 20, 1997

Events
- Total events: 14

Fights
- Total fights: 91
- Title fights: 3

Chronology
| 1996 in Pancrase | 1997 in Pancrase | 1998 in Pancrase |

The year 1997 was the fifth year in the history of Pancrase, a mixed martial arts promotion based in Japan. In 1997 Pancrase held 14 events beginning with Pancrase: Alive 1.

== Title fights ==
Title fights in 1997
| Weight class | | | | Method | Round | Time | Event | Notes |
|---|---|---|---|---|---|---|---|---|
| Openweight | Yuki Kondo | def. | Masakatsu Funaki | Submission (Triangle Armbar) | 1 | 15:12 | Pancrase: Alive 4 | (Note: For The Pancrase Openweight Championship.) |
| Openweight | Yuki Kondo | def. | Jason Delucia | Submission (Toe Hold) | 1 | 27:22 | Pancrase: 1997 Anniversary Show | (Note: For The Pancrase Openweight Championship.) |
| Openweight | Masakatsu Funaki | def. | Yuki Kondo | Submission (Triangle Kimura) | 1 | 2:20 | Pancrase: Alive 11 | (Note: For The Pancrase Openweight Championship.) |

== Events list ==
| # | Event title | Date | Arena | Location |
|---|---|---|---|---|
| 51 | Pancrase: Alive 11 | December 20, 1997 | Yokohama Cultural Gymnasium | Yokohama, Kanagawa, Japan |
| 50 | Pancrase: Alive 10 | November 16, 1997 | Kobe Fashion Mart | Kobe, Hyogo, Japan |
| 49 | Pancrase: Alive 9 | October 29, 1997 | Korakuen Hall | Tokyo, Japan |
| 48 | Pancrase: 1997 Anniversary Show | September 6, 1997 | Tokyo Bay NK Hall | Urayasu, Chiba, Japan |
| 47 | Pancrase: Alive 8 | August 9, 1997 | Umeda Stella Hall | Osaka, Osaka, Japan |
| 46 | Pancrase: 1997 Neo-Blood Tournament, Round 2 | July 20, 1997 | Korakuen Hall | Tokyo, Japan |
| 45 | Pancrase: 1997 Neo-Blood Tournament, Round 1 | July 20, 1997 | Korakuen Hall | Tokyo, Japan |
| 44 | Pancrase: Alive 7 | June 30, 1997 | Hakata Star Lanes | Hakata-ku, Fukuoka, Japan |
| 43 | Pancrase: Alive 6 | June 18, 1997 | Korakuen Hall | Tokyo, Japan |
| 42 | Pancrase: Alive 5 | May 24, 1997 | Kobe Fashion Mart | Kobe, Hyogo, Japan |
| 41 | Pancrase: Alive 4 | April 27, 1997 | Tokyo Bay NK Hall | Urayasu, Chiba, Japan |
| 40 | Pancrase: Alive 3 | March 22, 1997 | Tsuyuhashi Sport Center | Nagoya, Aichi, Japan |
| 39 | Pancrase: Alive 2 | February 22, 1997 | Tokyo Bay NK Hall | Urayasu, Chiba, Japan |
| 38 | Pancrase: Alive 1 | January 17, 1997 | Korakuen Hall | Tokyo, Japan |

== Pancrase: Alive 1 ==
Pancrase: Alive 1
- Date: January 17, 1997
- Venue: Korakuen Hall
- City: Tokyo, Japan

Pancrase: Alive 1 was an event held on January 17, 1997, at Korakuen Hall in Tokyo, Japan.

=== Results ===
Main Card
| Weight class | | | | Method | Round | Time | Notes |
|---|---|---|---|---|---|---|---|
| | Yuki Kondo | def. | Kiuma Kunioku | Decision (Split) | 1 | 20:00 |
| | Guy Mezger | def. | Semmy Schilt | Decision (Lost Points) | 1 | 20:00 |
| | Osami Shibuya | def. | Takaku Fuke | Decision (Unanimous) | 1 | 15:00 |
| | Ryushi Yanagisawa | def. | Jong Wang Kim | Submission (Ankle Lock) | 1 | 1:47 |
| | Takafumi Ito | def. | Haygar Chin | TKO (Lost Points) | 1 | 4:42 |
| | Keiichiro Yamamiya | def. | Brian Gassaway | Decision (Lost Points) | 1 | 10:00 |
| | Satoshi Hasegawa | def. | Wes Gassaway | Decision (Unanimous) | 1 | 10:00 |

== Pancrase: Alive 2 ==
Pancrase: Alive 2
- Date: February 22, 1997
- Venue: Tokyo Bay NK Hall
- City: Urayasu, Chiba, Japan

Pancrase: Alive 2 was an event held on February 22, 1997, at the Tokyo Bay NK Hall in Urayasu, Chiba, Japan.

=== Results ===
Main Card
| Weight class | | | | Method | Round | Time | Notes |
|---|---|---|---|---|---|---|---|
| | Masakatsu Funaki | def. | Semmy Schilt | Submission (Toe Hold) | 1 | 5:47 |
| | Yuki Kondo | def. | Guy Mezger | Decision (Lost Points) | 1 | 15:00 |
| | Osami Shibuya | def. | Jong Wang Kim | Submission (Kneebar) | 1 | 0:58 |
| | Ryushi Yanagisawa | def. | Paul Lazenby | TKO (Lost Points) | 1 | 12:39 |
| | Takaku Fuke | def. | Haygar Chin | Submission (Ankle Lock) | 1 | 3:46 |
| | Satoshi Hasegawa | def. | Serge Narsisyan | Decision (Unanimous) | 1 | 15:00 |
| | Keiichiro Yamamiya | def. | Takafumi Ito | Decision (Lost Points) | 1 | 15:00 |

== Pancrase: Alive 3 ==
Pancrase: Alive 3
- Date: March 22, 1997
- Venue: Tsuyuhashi Sport Center
- City: Nagoya, Aichi, Japan

Pancrase: Alive 3 was an event held on March 22, 1997, at the Tsuyuhashi Sport Center in Nagoya, Aichi, Japan.

=== Results ===
Main Card
| Weight class | | | | Method | Round | Time | Notes |
|---|---|---|---|---|---|---|---|
| | Masakatsu Funaki | def. | Paul Lazenby | Submission (Top Wristlock) | 1 | 4:36 |
| | Semmy Schilt | def. | Kazuo Takahashi | TKO (Palm Strikes) | 1 | 7:00 |
| | Osami Shibuya | vs. | Bas Rutten | Draw (Majority) | 1 | 15:00 |
| | Yuki Kondo | def. | Jong Wang Kim | Submission (Armbar) | 1 | 0:25 |
| | Ryushi Yanagisawa | def. | Keiichiro Yamamiya | Decision (Lost Points) | 1 | 10:00 |
| | Kiuma Kunioku | def. | Haygar Chin | Submission (Armbar) | 1 | 7:44 |
| | Takafumi Ito | def. | Satoshi Hasegawa | Decision (Unanimous) | 1 | 10:00 |

== Pancrase: Alive 4 ==
Pancrase: Alive 4
- Date: April 27, 1997
- Venue: Tokyo Bay NK Hall
- City: Urayasu, Chiba, Japan

Pancrase: Alive 4 was an event held on April 27, 1997, at Tokyo Bay NK Hall in Urayasu, Chiba, Japan.

=== Results ===
Main Card
| Weight class | | | | Method | Round | Time | Notes |
|---|---|---|---|---|---|---|---|
| | Yuki Kondo | def. | Masakatsu Funaki | Submission (Triangle Armbar) | 1 | 15:12 | (Note: For the Pancrase Openweight Championship.) |
| | Bas Rutten | def. | Kiuma Kunioku | Decision (Lost Points) | 1 | 15:00 |
| | Ryushi Yanagisawa | def. | Paul Varelans | Decision (Lost Points) | 1 | 15:00 |
| | Leon van Dijk | def. | Osami Shibuya | Submission (Ankle Lock) | 1 | 5:30 |
| | Jason DeLucia | def. | Takafumi Ito | Submission (Rear-Naked Choke) | 1 | 4:54 |
| | Kazuo Takahashi | def. | Satoshi Hasegawa | TKO (Palm Strikes) | 1 | 6:20 |
| | Takaku Fuke | def. | Paul Lazenby | Submission (Ankle Lock) | 1 | 7:45 |
| | Keiichiro Yamamiya | def. | Taka Michinoku | Submission (Keylock) | 1 | 7:36 |

== Pancrase: Alive 5 ==
Pancrase: Alive 5
- Date: May 24, 1997
- Venue: Kobe Fashion Mart
- City: Kobe, Hyogo, Japan

Pancrase: Alive 5 was an event held on May 24, 1997, at the Kobe Fashion Mart in Kobe, Hyogo, Japan.

=== Results ===
Main Card
| Weight class | | | | Method | Round | Time | Notes |
|---|---|---|---|---|---|---|---|
| | Minoru Suzuki | def. | Joel Sutton | Submission (Keylock) | 1 | 0:48 |
| | Yuki Kondo | def. | Gary Myers | Submission (Heel Hook) | 1 | 5:35 |
| | Jason DeLucia | def. | Kazuo Takahashi | Submission (Armbar) | 1 | 5:13 |
| | Semmy Schilt | def. | Takaku Fuke | Submission (Rear-Naked Choke) | 1 | 8:59 |
| | Kiuma Kunioku | vs. | Keiichiro Yamamiya | Draw (Majority) | 1 | 10:00 |
| | Takafumi Ito | def. | Jong Wang Kim | Submission (Armbar) | 1 | 0:55 |

== Pancrase: Alive 6 ==
Pancrase: Alive 6
- Date: June 18, 1997
- Venue: Korakuen Hall
- City: Tokyo, Japan

Pancrase: Alive 6 was an event held on June 18, 1997, at Korakuen Hall in Tokyo, Japan.

=== Results ===
Main Card
| Weight class | | | | Method | Round | Time | Notes |
|---|---|---|---|---|---|---|---|
| | Minoru Suzuki | def. | Jagjit Singh | KO (Palm Strike) | 1 | 0:21 |
| | Jason DeLucia | def. | Kiuma Kunioku | TKO (Doctor Stoppage) | 1 | 18:51 |
| | Ryushi Yanagisawa | def. | Les Johnston | Submission (Banana Split) | 1 | 8:35 |
| | Takafumi Ito | def. | Jason Godsey | Submission (Rear-Naked Choke) | 1 | 11:09 |
| | Osami Shibuya | def. | David Moore | Submission (Ankle Lock) | 1 | 5:45 |
| | Satoshi Hasegawa | def. | Paul Lazenby | Decision (Lost Points) | 1 | 10:00 |

== Pancrase: Alive 7 ==
Pancrase: Alive 7
- Date: June 30, 1997
- Venue: Hakata Star Lanes
- City: Hakata-ku, Fukuoka, Japan

Pancrase: Alive 7 was an event held on June 30, 1997, at Hakata Star Lanes in Hakata-ku, Fukuoka, Japan.

=== Results ===
Main Card
| Weight class | | | | Method | Round | Time | Notes |
|---|---|---|---|---|---|---|---|
| | Yuki Kondo | def. | Semmy Schilt | Decision (Unanimous) | 1 | 20:00 |
| | Masakatsu Funaki | def. | Wes Gassaway | Submission (Ankle Lock) | 1 | 1:05 |
| | Bas Rutten | def. | Takaku Fuke | Submission (Armbar) | 1 | 4:28 |
| | Guy Mezger | def. | Keiichiro Yamamiya | Decision (Lost Points) | 1 | 15:00 |
| | Osami Shibuya | def. | Brian Gassaway | Submission (Armbar) | 1 | 8:47 |
| | Alex Andrade | def. | Satoshi Hasegawa | Decision (Lost Points) | 1 | 10:00 |

== Pancrase: 1997 Neo-Blood Tournament, Round 1 ==
Pancrase: 1997 Neo-Blood Tournament, Round 1
- Date: July 20, 1997
- Venue: Korakuen Hall
- City: Tokyo, Japan

Pancrase: 1997 Neo-Blood Tournament, Round 1 was an event held on July 20, 1997, at Korakuen Hall in Tokyo, Japan.

=== Results ===
Main Card
| Weight class | | | | Method | Round | Time | Notes |
|---|---|---|---|---|---|---|---|
| | Masakatsu Funaki | def. | Osami Shibuya | Submission (Guillotine Choke) | 1 | 9:30 |
| | Leon van Dijk | def. | Takafumi Ito | Submission (Rear-Naked Choke) | 2 | 1:05 |
| | Keiichiro Yamamiya | def. | Les Johnston | Submission (Guillotine Choke) | 1 | 4:07 |
| | Kosei Kubota | def. | Jong Wang Kim | TKO (Wrist Injury) | 1 | 2:45 |
| | Ikuhisa Minowa | def. | Haygar Chin | Submission (Kneebar) | 1 | 2:24 |
| | Satoshi Hasegawa | def. | David Moore | Submission (Shoulder Lock) | 1 | 3:57 |

== Pancrase: 1997 Neo-Blood Tournament, Round 2 ==
Pancrase: 1997 Neo-Blood Tournament, Round 2
- Date: July 20, 1997
- Venue: Korakuen Hall
- City: Tokyo, Japan

Pancrase: 1997 Neo-Blood Tournament, Round 2 was an event held on July 20, 1997, at Korakuen Hall in Tokyo, Japan.

=== Results ===
Main Card
| Weight class | | | | Method | Round | Time | Notes |
|---|---|---|---|---|---|---|---|
| | Keiichiro Yamamiya | def. | Satoshi Hasegawa | TKO (Knees) | 1 | 5:50 |
| | Jason Godsey | def. | Yuki Kondo | Submission (Neck Crank) | 1 | 8:17 |
| | Keiichiro Yamamiya | def. | Kosei Kubota | Decision (Lost Points) | 1 | 10:00 |
| | Satoshi Hasegawa | def. | Ikuhisa Minowa | Decision (Unanimous) | 2 | 3:00 |

== Pancrase: Alive 8 ==
Pancrase: Alive 8
- Date: August 9, 1997
- Venue: Umeda Stella Hall
- City: Osaka, Osaka, Japan

Pancrase: Alive 8 was an event held on August 9, 1997, at Umeda Stella Hall in Osaka, Osaka, Japan.

=== Results ===
Main Card
| Weight class | | | | Method | Round | Time | Notes |
|---|---|---|---|---|---|---|---|
| | Keiichiro Yamamiya | def. | Osami Shibuya | Decision (1-0) | 2 | 3:00 |
| | Kiuma Kunioku | def. | Satoshi Hasegawa | Submission (Toe Hold) | 1 | 9:07 |
| | Takaku Fuke | def. | Kosei Kubota | Submission (Guillotine Choke) | 1 | 3:22 |
| | Yuki Kondo | def. | Ikuhisa Minowa | Submission (Toe Hold) | 1 | 5:13 |

== Pancrase: 1997 Anniversary Show ==
Pancrase: 1997 Anniversary Show
- Date: September 6, 1997
- Venue: Tokyo Bay NK Hall
- City: Urayasu, Chiba, Japan

Pancrase: 1997 Anniversary Show was an event held on September 6, 1997, at Tokyo Bay NK Hall in Urayasu, Chiba, Japan.

=== Results ===
Main Card
| Weight class | | | | Method | Round | Time | Notes |
|---|---|---|---|---|---|---|---|
| | Yuki Kondo | def. | Jason Delucia | Submission (Toe Hold) | 1 | 27:22 | (Note: For The Pancrase Openweight Championship.) |
| | Masakatsu Funaki | def. | Guy Mezger | Submission (Triangle Armbar) | 1 | 3:58 |
| | Keiichiro Yamamiya | def. | Minoru Suzuki | Decision (Lost Points) | 1 | 20:00 |
| | Bas Rutten | def. | Osami Shibuya | Submission (Bas Rutten Neck Crank) | 1 | 3:15 |
| | Kiuma Kunioku | def. | John Lober | Decision (Lost Points) | 1 | 10:00 |
| | Jason Godsey | def. | Kazuo Takahashi | Submission (Rear-Naked Choke) | 2 | 1:20 |
| | Takafumi Ito | def. | Takaku Fuke | Submission (Armbar) | 1 | 5:52 |
| | Jong Wang Kim | def. | Chris Chalmers | Submission (Forearm Choke) | 1 | 8:35 |
| | Ikuhisa Minowa | vs. | Kosei Kubota | Draw (Majority) | 1 | 10:00 |

== Pancrase: Alive 9 ==
PPancrase: Alive 9
- Date: October 29, 1997
- Venue: Korakuen Hall
- City: Tokyo, Japan

Pancrase: Alive 9 was an event held on October 29, 1997, at Korakuen Hall in Tokyo, Japan.

=== Results ===
Main Card
| Weight class | | | | Method | Round | Time | Notes |
|---|---|---|---|---|---|---|---|
| | Yuki Kondo | def. | Leon Van Dijk | Decision (Unanimous) | 1 | 20:00 |
| | Guy Mezger | def. | Kiuma Kunioku | KO (Head Kick) | 1 | 11:12 |
| | John Lober | vs. | Osami Shibuya | Draw (Majority) | 1 | 15:00 |
| | Keiichiro Yamamiya | vs. | Tra Telligman | Draw (Majority) | 2 | 3:00 |
| | Kazuo Takahashi | def. | Jong Wang Kim | KO (Knees) | 1 | 1:06 |
| | Takafumi Ito | def. | Ikuhisa Minowa | Submission (Toe Hold) | 1 | 6:34 |
| | Satoshi Hasegawa | vs. | Kosei Kubota | Draw (Majority) | 2 | 3:00 |

== Pancrase: Alive 10 ==
PPancrase: Alive 10
- Date: November 16, 1997
- Venue: Kobe Fashion Mart
- City: Kobe, Hyogo, Japan

Pancrase: Alive 10 was an event held on November 16, 1997, at the Kobe Fashion Mart in Kobe, Hyogo, Japan.

=== Results ===
Main Card
| Weight class | | | | Method | Round | Time | Notes |
|---|---|---|---|---|---|---|---|
| | Yuki Kondo | def. | Kazuo Takahashi | Submission (Arm-Triangle Choke) | 1 | 7:27 |
| | Masakatsu Funaki | def. | Jason Godsey | Submission (Calf Slicer) | 1 | 7:12 |
| | Keiichiro Yamamiya | def. | Takafumi Ito | Decision (Majority) | 2 | 3:00 |
| | Osami Shibuya | def. | Ikuhisa Minowa | Decision (Lost Points) | 1 | 10:00 |
| | Satoshi Hasegawa | def. | Takaku Fuke | Decision (Lost Points) | 1 | 10:00 |
| | Kosei Kubota | def. | Omar Bouiche | Decision (Unanimous) | 2 | 3:00 |

== Pancrase: Alive 11 ==
PPancrase: Alive 11
- Date: December 20, 1997
- Venue: Yokohama Cultural Gymnasium
- City: Yokohama, Kanagawa, Japan

Pancrase: Alive 11 was an event held on December 20, 1997, at the Yokohama Cultural Gymnasium in Yokohama, Kanagawa, Japan.

=== Results ===
Main Card
| Weight class | | | | Method | Round | Time | Notes |
|---|---|---|---|---|---|---|---|
| | Masakatsu Funaki | def. | Yuki Kondo | Submission (Triangle Kimura) | 1 | 2:20 | (Note: For The Pancrase Openweight Championship.) |
| | Bas Rutten | def. | Keiichiro Yamamiya | Submission (Rear-Naked Choke) | 1 | 4:58 |
| | Ryushi Yanagisawa | def. | John Lober | TKO (Broken Ankle) | 1 | 0:55 |
| | Jason DeLucia | def. | Ikuhisa Minowa | Submission (Rear-Naked Choke) | 1 | 3:47 |
| | Guy Mezger | def. | Satoshi Hasegawa | Technical Submission (Straight Armbar) | 1 | 2:52 |
| | Osami Shibuya | vs. | Igor Zinoviev | Draw (Unanimous) | 2 | 3:00 |
| | Jong Wang Kim | def. | Kiuma Kunioku | Technical Submission (Guillotine Choke) | 1 | 0:21 |
| | Takafumi Ito | def. | Kosei Kubota | Submission (Toe Hold) | 1 | 7:03 |

== See also ==
- Pancrase
- List of Pancrase champions
- List of Pancrase events
