= 2000 in Pancrase =

Mixed martial arts events

Information
- First date: January 23, 2000
- Last date: December 9, 2000

Events
- Total events: 13

Fights
- Total fights: 90
- Title fights: 5

Chronology
1999 in Pancrase	2000 in Pancrase	2001 in Pancrase

The year 2000 was the eighth year in the history of Pancrase, a mixed martial arts promotion based in Japan. In 2000 Pancrase held 13 events beginning with Pancrase: Trans 1.

== Title fights ==
Title fights in 2000
Weight class				Method	Round	Time	Event	Notes
Openweight	Semmy Schilt (c)	def.	Kazuo Takahashi	TKO (Punches)	1	7:30	Pancrase: Trans 3	(Note: For the Pancrase Openweight Championship.)
Middleweight	Nate Marquardt	def.	Shonie Carter	Decision (Unanimous)	2	3:00	Pancrase: 2000 Anniversary Show	(Note: For the Pancrase Middleweight Championship.)
Light Heavyweight	Keiichiro Yamamiya	def.	Ikuhisa Minowa	Decision (Unanimous)	2	3:00	Pancrase: 2000 Anniversary Show	(Note: For The Pancrase Light Heavyweight Championship.)
Openweight	Semmy Schilt (c)	def.	Osami Shibuya	TKO (Punches)	1	8:55	Pancrase: 2000 Anniversary Show	(Note: For the Pancrase Openweight Championship.)
Middleweight	Nate Marquardt (c)	vs.	Kiuma Kunioku	Draw	1	20:00	Pancrase: Trans 7	(Note: For the Pancrase Middleweight Championship.)

== Events list ==
#	Event title	Date	Arena	Location
93	Pancrase: Trans 8	December 9, 2000	Aomori Prefectural Gymnasium	Aomori, Japan
92	Pancrase: Trans 7	December 4, 2000	Japanese Martial Arts Building	Tokyo, Japan
91	Pancrase: Pancrase UK	November 25, 2000	York Hall	London, England
90	Pancrase: Trans 6	October 31, 2000	Korakuen Hall	Tokyo, Japan
89	Pancrase: 2000 Anniversary Show	September 24, 2000	Yokohama Cultural Gymnasium	Yokohama, Kanagawa, Japan
88	Pancrase: 2000 Neo-Blood Tournament Second Round	August 27, 2000	Umeda Stella Hall	Osaka, Osaka, Japan
87	Pancrase: Trans 5	July 23, 2000	Korakuen Hall	Tokyo, Japan
86	Pancrase: 2000 Neo-Blood Tournament Opening Round	July 23, 2000	Korakuen Hall	Tokyo, Japan
85	Pancrase: Australia	July 10, 2000		Australia
84	Pancrase: Trans 4	June 26, 2000	Korakuen Hall	Tokyo, Japan
83	Pancrase: Trans 3	April 30, 2000	Yokohama Cultural Gymnasium	Yokohama, Kanagawa, Japan
82	Pancrase: Trans 2	February 27, 2000	Umeda Stella Hall	Osaka, Osaka, Japan
81	Pancrase: Trans 1	January 23, 2000	Korakuen Hall	Tokyo, Japan

== Pancrase: Trans 1 ==
Pancrase: Trans 1
- Date: January 23, 2000
- Venue: Korakuen Hall
- City: Tokyo, Japan

Pancrase: Trans 1 was an event held on January 23, 2000 at Korakuen Hall in Tokyo, Japan.

=== Results ===
Main Card
Weight class				Method	Round	Time	Notes
	Yuki Kondo	def.	Manabu Yamada	Decision (Unanimous)	1	10:00
	Keiichiro Yamamiya	def.	Chris Lytle	Decision (Unanimous)	1	10:00
	Daisuke Ishii	def.	Masutatsu Yano	KO (Punches)	1	0:06
	Daiju Takase	def.	Daisuke Watanabe	Decision (Unanimous)	1	10:00
	Shonie Carter	def.	Kosei Kubota	Decision (Unanimous)	1	10:00
	Ichio Matsubara	vs.	Hiro Matsunaga	Draw	2	3:00

== Pancrase: Trans 2 ==
Pancrase: Trans 2
- Date: February 27, 2000
- Venue: Umeda Stella Hall
- City: Osaka, Osaka, Japan

Pancrase: Trans 2 was an event held on February 27, 2000 at Umeda Stella Hall in Osaka, Osaka, Japan.

=== Results ===
Main Card
Weight class				Method	Round	Time	Notes
	Sanae Kikuta	def.	Ryushi Yanagisawa	Decision (Unanimous)	1	15:00
	Kiuma Kunioku	def.	Genki Sudo	Decision (Unanimous)	2	3:00
	Ikuhisa Minowa	def.	Ichio Matsubara	Submission (Rear-Naked Choke)	1	1:21
	Katsuomi Inagaki	def.	Hiro Matsunaga	Decision (Unanimous)	1	10:00
	Daisuke Watanabe	def.	Hikaru Sato	Decision (Unanimous)	1	10:00

== Pancrase: Trans 3 ==
Pancrase: Trans 3
- Date: April 30, 2000
- Venue: Yokohama Cultural Gymnasium
- City: Yokohama, Kanagawa, Japan

Pancrase: Trans 3 was an event held on April 30, 2000 at the Yokohama Cultural Gymnasium in Yokohama, Kanagawa, Japan.

=== Results ===
Main Card
Weight class				Method	Round	Time	Notes
Openweight	Semmy Schilt (c)	def.	Kazuo Takahashi	TKO (Punches)	1	7:30	(Note: For the Pancrase Openweight Championship.)
	Shonie Carter	vs.	Kiuma Kunioku	Draw	2	3:00
	Bob Stines	def.	Jason DeLucia	TKO (Punches)	1	0:32
	Osami Shibuya	def.	Hiroshi Ota	Submission (Rear-Naked Choke)	1	6:05
	Minoru Suzuki	def.	Sean Daugherty	Submission (Kimura)	1	1:01
	Hikaru Sato	def.	Michael Sa Jin Kwok	Submission (Armbar)	1	2:23
	Daisuke Watanabe	vs.	Takaku Fuke	Draw	2	3:00
	Kosei Kubota	def.	Ichio Matsubara	Decision (Unanimous)	1	10:00

== Pancrase: Trans 4 ==
Pancrase: Trans 4
- Date: June 26, 2000
- Venue: Korakuen Hall
- City: Tokyo, Japan

Pancrase: Trans 4 was an event held on June 26, 2000 at Korakuen Hall, Tokyo, Japan.

=== Results ===
Main Card
Weight class				Method	Round	Time	Notes
	Omar Bouiche	def.	Daisuke Ishii	Technical Submission (Armbar)	1	4:15
	Keiichiro Yamamiya	def.	Kosei Kubota	Decision (Majority)	1	10:00
	Kiuma Kunioku	def.	Matt Lee	Submission (Armbar)	1	4:15
	Nate Marquardt	def.	Daiju Takase	KO (Knee)	2	1:30
	Sanae Kikuta	def.	Ichio Matsubara	Submission (Armbar)	1	2:13
	Daisuke Ishii	def.	Chris Lytle	Decision (Unanimous)	1	10:00
	Omar Bouiche	def.	Jason DeLucia	Submission (Armbar)	1	2:18
	Keiichiro Yamamiya	def.	Naohisa Kawamura	Decision (Unanimous)	1	10:00
	Kosei Kubota	def.	Daisuke Igarashi	Submission (Toe Hold)	1	2:28

== Pancrase: Australia ==
Pancrase: Australia
- Date: July 10, 2000
- City: Australia

Pancrase: Australia was an event held on July 10, 2000 in Australia.

=== Results ===
Main Card
Weight class				Method	Round	Time	Notes
	Justin Dorney	def.	David Frendin	TKO (Doctor Stoppage)	1	0:00
	David Frendin	def.	Dennis Grace	Submission (Rear Naked Choke)	1	0:00

== Pancrase: 2000 Neo-Blood Tournament Opening Round ==
Pancrase: 2000 Neo-Blood Tournament Opening Round
- Date: July 23, 2000
- Venue: Korakuen Hall
- City: Tokyo, Japan

Pancrase: 2000 Neo-Blood Tournament Opening Round was an event held on July 23, 2000 at Korakuen Hall in Tokyo, Japan.

=== Results ===
Main Card
Weight class				Method	Round	Time	Notes
	Yuji Hoshino	def.	Ichio Matsubara	Submission (Rear-Naked Choke)	1	3:45
	Daisuke Watanabe	def.	Eiji Ishikawa	Decision (Unanimous)	3	3:00
	Yuki Kondo	def.	Dan Theodore	Submission (Kneebar)	1	3:08
	Ian Freeman	def.	Bob Stines	KO (Punch)	1	2:38
	Yuji Hoshino	def.	Hikaru Sato	Decision (Unanimous)	2	3:00
	Ichio Matsubara	def.	Hattori Jimmy Motoki	Decision (Majority)	1	10:00
	Eiji Ishikawa	def.	Makoto Kato	Decision (Unanimous)	1	10:00
	Daisuke Watanabe	def.	Yohei Ota	Submission (Kimura)	1	4:52

== Pancrase: Trans 5 ==
Pancrase: Trans 5
- Date: July 23, 2000
- Venue: Korakuen Hall
- City: Tokyo, Japan

Pancrase: Trans 5 was an event held on July 23, 2000 at Korakuen Hall in Tokyo, Japan.

=== Results ===
Main Card
Weight class				Method	Round	Time	Notes
	Ikuhisa Minowa	def.	Tony Ross	Submission (Armbar)	1	1:32
	Brian Gassaway	def.	John Chrisostomo	Decision (Unanimous)	1	10:00
	Chris Lytle	def.	Taro Obata	Submission (Arm-Triangle Choke)	1	2:56
	Shonie Carter	def.	Yoshinori Kawasaki	Decision (Unanimous)	1	10:00
	Tony Ross	def.	Tomoya Takaesu	Decision (Majority)	2	3:00
	Ikuhisa Minowa	def.	Masaya Kojima	Submission (Toe Hold)	1	1:43
	John Chrisostomo	def.	Yukihiro Kanazawa	KO (Punch)	1	3:42
	Brian Gassaway	def.	Yuji Hisamatsu	Decision (Majority)	2	3:00

== Pancrase: 2000 Neo-Blood Tournament Second Round ==
Pancrase: 2000 Neo-Blood Tournament Second Round
- Date: August 27, 2000
- Venue: Umeda Stella Hall
- City: Osaka, Osaka, Japan

Pancrase: 2000 Neo-Blood Tournament Second Round was an event held on August 27, 2000 at Umeda Stella Hall in Osaka, Osaka, Japan.

=== Results ===
Main Card
Weight class				Method	Round	Time	Notes
	Yuji Hoshino	def.	Daisuke Watanabe	TKO (Doctor Stoppage)	1	13:22
	Kazuo Takahashi	def.	Masutatsu Yano	Decision (Unanimous)	1	10:00
	Eiji Ishikawa	def.	Hikaru Sato	Submission (Rear-Naked Choke)	1	2:43
	Mitsuyoshi Sato	def.	Ichio Matsubara	Technical Submission (Keylock)	1	1:24

== Pancrase: 2000 Anniversary Show ==
Pancrase: 2000 Anniversary Show
- Date: September 24, 2000
- Venue: Yokohama Cultural Gymnasium
- City: Yokohama, Kanagawa, Japan

Pancrase: 2000 Anniversary Show was an event held on September 24, 2000 at the Yokohama Cultural Gymnasium in Yokohama, Kanagawa, Japan.

=== Results ===
Main Card
Weight class				Method	Round	Time	Notes
Openweight	Semmy Schilt (c)	def.	Osami Shibuya	TKO (Punches)	1	8:55	(Note: For the Pancrase Openweight Championship.)
Light Heavyweight	Keiichiro Yamamiya	def.	Ikuhisa Minowa	Decision (Unanimous)	2	3:00	(Note: For the Pancrase Light Heavyweight Championship.)
Middleweight	Nate Marquardt	def.	Shonie Carter	Decision (Unanimous)	2	3:00	(Note: For the Pancrase Middleweight Championship.)
	Kengo Watanabe	def.	Joe Charles	Decision (Unanimous)	1	10:00
	Denis Kang	def.	Minoru Suzuki	Submission (Back Injury)	1	3:43
	Ikuhisa Minowa	def.	Brian Gassaway	Submission (Toe Hold)	1	5:00
	Keiichiro Yamamiya	def.	Omar Bouiche	Submission (Guillotine Choke)	1	6:46
	Shonie Carter	def.	Chris Lytle	Decision (Unanimous)	3	3:00
	Nate Marquardt	def.	Kiuma Kunioku	Decision (Unanimous)	1	10:00

== Pancrase: Trans 6 ==
Pancrase: Trans 6
- Date: October 31, 2000
- Venue: Korakuen Hall
- City: Tokyo, Japan

Pancrase: Trans 6 was an event held on October 31, 2000 at Korakuen Hall in Tokyo, Japan.

=== Results ===
Main Card
Weight class				Method	Round	Time	Notes
	Murilo Bustamante	def.	Sanae Kikuta	Decision (Unanimous)	1	15:00
	Genki Sudo	def.	Craig Oxley	Submission (Achilles Lock)	1	3:14
	Daisuke Ishii	def.	Yuji Hisamatsu	Decision (Unanimous)	1	10:00
	Jason DeLucia	def.	Takaichi Hirayama	Decision (Unanimous)	1	10:00
	Hiroshi Shibata	def.	Hikaru Sato	Decision (Unanimous)	1	10:00
	Yoshinori Kawasaki	def.	Satoru Kitaoka	Decision (Majority)	1	10:00
	Katsuhisa Fujii	def.	Johnny Huskey	Submission (Keylock)	1	1:40

== Pancrase: Pancrase UK ==
Pancrase: Pancrase UK
- Date: November 25, 2000
- Venue: York Hall
- City: London, England

Pancrase: Pancrase UK was an event held on November 25, 2000 at York Hall in London, England.

=== Results ===
Main Card
Weight class				Method	Round	Time	Notes
	Danny Rushton	def.	Loic Pora	Submission (Kneebar)	0	0:00
	James Zikic	def.	Bartolome Aguilera	Submission (Kneebar)	0	0:00
	Mark Weir	def.	Frank Ledroumaguet	Submission (Armbar)	0	0:00
	Alex Reid	def.	Rosaire Letapin	Decision	0	0:00
	Tony T	def.	Marc Jaskowiec	Submission (Kneebar)	0	0:00
	Jean Louis Alberch	def.	Gaz Roriston	Submission (Armbar)	0	0:00
	Danny Fletcher	def.	Patrick Figaro	Decision	0	0:00
	Jess Liaudin	def.	Moise Rimbon	Decision (1-0 Points)	0	0:00
	Christophe Durant	def.	Michael Johnson	Submission (Triangle Choke)	0	0:00
	John Thorpe	def.	Stephane Fouchot	Decision (1-0 Points)	0	0:00

== Pancrase: Trans 7 ==
Pancrase: Trans 7
- Date: December 4, 2000
- Venue: Japanese Martial Arts Building
- City: Tokyo, Japan

Pancrase: Trans 7 was an event held on December 4, 2000 at the Japanese Martial Arts Building in Tokyo, Japan.

=== Results ===
Main Card
Weight class				Method	Round	Time	Notes
Middleweight	Nate Marquardt (c)	vs.	Kiuma Kunioku	Draw	1	20:00	(Note: For The Pancrase Middleweight Championship.)
	Sanae Kikuta	def.	Kazuo Takahashi	Submission (Arm Triangle Choke)	1	7:22
	Keiichiro Yamamiya	def.	Denis Kang	Decision (Majority)	2	3:00
	Ikuhisa Minowa	def.	Magomed Ismailov	Submission (Armbar)	1	1:31
	Daisuke Ishii	def.	Darius Grilauskas	TKO (Punches)	1	4:17
	Kengo Watanabe	def.	Ramaz Kikalishvili	TKO (Punches)	1	8:58
	Katsuhisa Fujii	vs.	Jason DeLucia	Draw
	Shonie Carter	def.	Yuji Hoshino	Decision (Majority)	1	15:00

== Pancrase: Trans 8 ==
Pancrase: Trans 8
- Date: December 9, 2000
- Venue: Aomori Prefectural Gymnasium
- City: Aomori, Japan

Pancrase: Trans 8 was an event held on December 9, 2000 at the Aomori Prefectural Gymnasium in Aomori, Japan.

=== Results ===
Main Card
Weight class				Method	Round	Time	Notes
	Osami Shibuya	def.	Mikhail Kebedov	Submission (Armbar)	1	0:56
	Kosei Kubota	def.	Gia Chiragishvili	Submission (Kimura)	1	1:04
	Daisuke Watanabe	def.	David Davitashvili	Technical Submission (Armbar)	1	3:24
	Eiji Ishikawa	def.	Sen Nakadai	Submission (Armbar)	1	8:48
	Hikaru Sato	def.	Shinya Sato	Decision (Unanimous)	1	10:00
	Satoru Kitaoka	def.	Kazuhito Kikuchi	Decision (Unanimous)	1	10:00

== See also ==
- Pancrase
- List of Pancrase champions
- List of Pancrase events
