= 1999 in Pancrase =

Mixed martial arts events

Information
- First date: January 19, 1999
- Last date: December 18, 1999

Events
- Total events: 14

Fights
- Total fights: 88
- Title fights: 3

Chronology
1998 in Pancrase	1999 in Pancrase	2000 in Pancrase

The year 1999 was the seventh year in the history of Pancrase, a mixed martial arts promotion based in Japan. In 1999 Pancrase held 14 events beginning with Pancrase: Breakthrough 1.

== Title fights ==
Title fights in 1999
Weight class				Method	Round	Time	Event	Notes
Openweight	Yuki Kondo	def.	Semmy Schilt	Decision (Lost Points)	1	20:00	Pancrase: Breakthrough 4	(Note: For The Pancrase Openweight Championship.)
Openweight	Yuki Kondo (c)	def.	Kiuma Kunioku	KO (Flying Knee and Palm Strikes)	1	0:34	Pancrase: 1999 Anniversary Show	(Note: For The Pancrase Openweight Championship.)
Openweight	Semmy Schilt	def.	Yuki Kondo (c)	Submission (Rear-Naked Choke)	1	2:28	Pancrase: Breakthrough 10	(Note: For The Pancrase Openweight Championship.)

== Events list ==
#	Event title	Date	Arena	Location
80	Pancrase: Breakthrough 11	December 18, 1999	Yokohama Cultural Gymnasium	Yokohama, Kanagawa, Japan
79	Pancrase: Breakthrough 10	November 28, 1999	Namihaya Dome	Kadoma, Osaka, Japan
78	Pancrase: Breakthrough 9	October 25, 1999	Korakuen Hall	Tokyo, Japan
77	Pancrase: 1999 Anniversary Show	September 18, 1999	Tokyo Bay NK Hall	Urayasu, Chiba, Japan
76	Pancrase: Breakthrough 8	September 4, 1999	Sendai Spring General Gymnasium	Sendai, Miyagi, Japan
75	Pancrase: 1999 Neo-Blood Tournament Second Round	August 1, 1999	Korakuen Hall	Tokyo, Japan
74	Pancrase: 1999 Neo-Blood Tournament Opening Round	August 1, 1999	Korakuen Hall	Tokyo, Japan
73	Pancrase: Breakthrough 7	July 6, 1999	Korakuen Hall	Tokyo, Japan
72	Pancrase: Breakthrough 6	June 11, 1999	Korakuen Hall	Tokyo, Japan
71	Pancrase: Breakthrough 5	May 23, 1999	Chikusa Sport Center	Nagoya, Aichi, Japan
70	Pancrase: Breakthrough 4	April 18, 1999	Yokohama Cultural Gymnasium	Yokohama, Kanagawa, Japan
69	Pancrase: Breakthrough 3	March 9, 1999	Korakuen Hall	Tokyo, Japan
68	Pancrase: Breakthrough 2	February 11, 1999	Umeda Stella Hall	Osaka, Osaka, Japan
67	Pancrase: Breakthrough 1	January 19, 1999	Korakuen Hall	Tokyo, Japan

== Pancrase: Breakthrough 1 ==
Pancrase: Breakthrough 1
- Date: January 19, 1999
- Venue: Korakuen Hall
- City: Tokyo, Japan

Pancrase: Breakthrough 1 was an event held on January 19, 1999, at Korakuen Hall in Tokyo, Japan.

=== Results ===
Main Card
Weight class				Method	Round	Time	Notes
	Jason Delucia	def.	Kiuma Kunioku	Decision (Lost Points)	1	15:00
	Yuki Kondo	def.	Satoshi Hasegawa	TKO (Palm Strike)	1	0:48
	Osami Shibuya	vs.	Leon van Dijk	Draw	1	15:00
	Manabu Yamada	def.	David Moore	Technical Submission (Guillotine Choke)	1	0:20
	Takafumi Ito	def.	Katsuomi Inagaki	Decision (Majority)	1	10:00
	Ikuhisa Minowa	def.	Daisuke Watanabe	Submission (Armbar)	1	3:18
	Kosei Kubota	def.	Minoru Toyonaga	Decision (Unanimous)	1	10:00

== Pancrase: Breakthrough 2 ==
Pancrase: Breakthrough 2
- Date: February 11, 1999
- Venue: Umeda Stella Hall
- City: Osaka, Osaka, Japan

Pancrase: Breakthrough 2 was an event held on February 11, 1999, at Umeda Stella Hall in Osaka, Osaka, Japan.

=== Results ===
Main Card
Weight class				Method	Round	Time	Notes
	Takafumi Ito	vs.	Osami Shibuya	Draw	2	3:00
	Ryushi Yanagisawa	vs.	Satoshi Hasegawa	Draw	2	3:00
	Ikuhisa Minowa	def.	Daisuke Ishii	Decision (Majority)	1	10:00
	Kiuma Kunioku	def.	Daisuke Watanabe	Technical Submission (Kimura)	1	3:58
	Kosei Kubota	def.	Kengo Watanabe	Decision (Unanimous)	1	10:00
	Yuichi Miyazaki	def.	Shinji Katase	Submission (Rear-Naked Choke)	1	3:22

== Pancrase: Breakthrough 3 ==
Pancrase: Breakthrough 3
- Date: March 9, 1999
- Venue: Korakuen Hall
- City: Tokyo, Japan

Pancrase: Breakthrough 3 was an event held on March 9, 1999, at Korakuen Hall in Tokyo, Japan.

=== Results ===
Main Card
Weight class				Method	Round	Time	Notes
	Ryushi Yanagisawa	vs.	Manabu Yamada	Draw	1	15:00
	Kiuma Kunioku	def.	Yuki Kondo	Decision (Unanimous)	1	15:00
	Semmy Schilt	def.	Takafumi Ito	Submission (Arm-Triangle Choke)	1	1:45
	Keiichiro Yamamiya	def.	Naoki Sano	TKO (Strikes)	1	10:43
	Ikuhisa Minowa	def.	Kosei Kubota	Decision (Unanimous)	1	10:00
	Daisuke Ishii	def.	Daisuke Watanabe	Decision (Unanimous)	2	3:00

== Pancrase: Breakthrough 4 ==
Pancrase: Breakthrough 4
- Date: April 18, 1999
- Venue: Yokohama Cultural Gymnasium
- City: Yokohama, Kanagawa, Japan

Pancrase: Breakthrough 4 was an event held on April 18, 1999, at the Yokohama Cultural Gymnasium in Yokohama, Kanagawa, Japan.

=== Results ===
Main Card
Weight class				Method	Round	Time	Notes
Openweight	Yuki Kondo	def.	Semmy Schilt	Decision (Lost Points)	1	20:00	(Note: For The Pancrase Openweight Championship.)
	Masakatsu Funaki	vs.	Ebenezer Fontes Braga	Draw	1	15:00
	Kazuo Takahashi	def.	Omar Bouiche	Submission (Armbar)	1	8:47
	Leon van Dijk	def.	Evan Tanner	TKO (Knees and Palm Strikes)	1	11:39
	Kengo Watanabe	vs.	Bob Stines	Draw	1	15:00
	Osami Shibuya	vs.	Chris Lytle	Draw	1	15:00
	Daisuke Ishii	vs.	Daiju Takase	Draw	1	15:00
	Katsuomi Inagaki	def.	Daisuke Watanabe	Submission (Rear-Naked Choke)	1	7:44

== Pancrase: Breakthrough 5 ==
Pancrase: Breakthrough 5
- Date: May 23, 1999
- Venue: Chikusa Sport Center
- City: Nagoya, Aichi, Japan

Pancrase: Breakthrough 5 was an event held on May 23, 1999, at Chikusa Sport Center in Nagoya, Aichi, Japan.

=== Results ===
Main Card
Weight class				Method	Round	Time	Notes
	Kiuma Kunioku	def.	Keiichiro Yamamiya	Decision (Lost Points)	1	15:00
	Jason DeLucia	def.	Ryushi Yanagisawa	Decision (Majority)	1	15:00
	Manabu Yamada	def.	Leon van Dijk	Decision (Majority)	1	10:00
	Osami Shibuya	vs.	Ikuhisa Minowa	Draw	2	3:00
	Takafumi Ito	def.	Daisuke Ishii	Decision (Unanimous)	1	10:00
	Kosei Kubota	def.	Daisuke Watanabe	Decision (Unanimous)	1	10:00
	Masamoto Iba	def.	Yuichi Miyazaki	Submission (Kneebar)	1	5:47

== Pancrase: Breakthrough 6 ==
Pancrase: Breakthrough 6
- Date: June 11, 1999
- Venue: Korakuen Hall
- City: Tokyo, Japan

Pancrase: Breakthrough 6 was an event held on June 11, 1999, at Korakuen Hall in Tokyo, Japan.

=== Results ===
Main Card
Weight class				Method	Round	Time	Notes
	Kazuo Takahashi	vs.	John Lober	Draw	2	3:00
	Sanae Kikuta	def.	Eric Gedek	Submission (Rear-Naked Choke)	1	1:20
	Jason DeLucia	def.	Ikuhisa Minowa	Decision (Unanimous)	1	10:00
	Ryushi Yanagisawa	vs.	Takafumi Ito	Draw	2	3:00
	Daisuke Ishii	def.	Kosei Kubota	Decision (Unanimous)	1	10:00
	Chris Lytle	def.	Daisuke Watanabe	Submission (Armbar)	1	5:30

== Pancrase: Breakthrough 7 ==
Pancrase: Breakthrough 7
- Date: July 6, 1999
- Venue: Korakuen Hall
- City: Tokyo, Japan

Pancrase: Breakthrough 7 was an event held on July 6, 1999, at Korakuen Hall in Tokyo, Japan.

=== Results ===
Main Card
Weight class				Method	Round	Time	Notes
	Semmy Schilt	def.	Osami Shibuya	Submission (Rear-Naked Choke)	1	12:06
	Keiichiro Yamamiya	def.	Leon van Dijk	TKO (Punches)	1	2:05
	Katsuomi Inagaki	def.	Yasuaki Hiramatsu	Submission (Punches)	1	5:58
	Yuki Kondo	def.	Daisuke Watanabe	KO (Punch)	1	0:21
	Jason DeLucia	def.	Chris Lytle	Decision (Majority)	1	10:00
	Sanae Kikuta	def.	Takafumi Ito	Decision (Unanimous)	2	3:00

== Pancrase: 1999 Neo-Blood Tournament Opening Round ==
Pancrase: 1999 Neo-Blood Tournament Opening Round
- Date: August 1, 1999
- Venue: Korakuen Hall
- City: Tokyo, Japan

Pancrase: 1999 Neo-Blood Tournament Opening Round was an event held on August 1, 1999, at Korakuen Hall in Tokyo, Japan.

=== Results ===
Main Card
Weight class				Method	Round	Time	Notes
	Yuki Kondo	def.	Jason Godsey	Submission (Toe Hold)	1	5:08
	Chris Lytle	vs.	Takafumi Ito	Draw	2	3:00
	Minoru Toyonaga	def.	Daisuke Ishii	Decision (Split)	2	3:00
	Genki Sudo	def.	Kosei Kubota	Decision (Unanimous)	2	3:00
	Ikuhisa Minowa	def.	Daiju Takase	Submission (Triangle Choke)	1	7:59
	Daisuke Watanabe	def.	Masamoto Iba	Decision (Unanimous)	1	10:00

== Pancrase: 1999 Neo-Blood Tournament Second Round ==
Pancrase: 1999 Neo-Blood Tournament Second Round
- Date: August 1, 1999
- Venue: Korakuen Hall
- City: Tokyo, Japan

Pancrase: 1999 Neo-Blood Tournament Second Round was an event held on August 1, 1999, at Korakuen Hall in Tokyo, Japan.

=== Results ===
Main Card
Weight class				Method	Round	Time	Notes
	Ikuhisa Minowa	def.	Minoru Toyonaga	Submission (Rear-Naked Choke)	1	2:57
	Leon van Dijk	def.	Ryushi Yanagisawa	TKO (Doctor Stoppage)	1	12:48
	Jason DeLucia	def.	Manabu Yamada	Decision (Unanimous)	1	15:00
	Minoru Toyonaga	def.	Genki Sudo	Decision (Unanimous)	2	3:00
	Ikuhisa Minowa	def.	Daisuke Watanabe	Submission (Triangle Choke)	1	4:28

== Pancrase: Breakthrough 8 ==
Pancrase: Breakthrough 8
- Date: September 4, 1999
- Venue: Sendai Spring General Gymnasium
- City: Sendai, Miyagi, Japan

Pancrase: Breakthrough 8 was an event held on September 4, 1999, at the Sendai Spring General Gymnasium in Sendai, Miyagi, Japan.

=== Results ===
Main Card
Weight class				Method	Round	Time	Notes
	Semmy Schilt	def.	Katsuomi Inagaki	KO (Knee)	1	8:23
	Manabu Yamada	def.	Tae Yoon Han	Submission (Armbar)	1	0:48
	Daisuke Ishii	def.	Jong Wang Kim	TKO (Doctor Stoppage)	1	5:15
	Takafumi Ito	def.	Daisuke Watanabe	Decision (Unanimous)	1	10:00
	Kosei Kubota	def.	Shinji Katase	Submission (Ankle Lock)	1	1:25

== Pancrase: 1999 Anniversary Show ==
Pancrase: 1999 Anniversary Show
- Date: September 18, 1999
- Venue: Tokyo Bay NK Hall
- City: Urayasu, Chiba, Japan

Pancrase: 1999 Anniversary Show was an event held on September 18, 1999, at the Tokyo Bay NK Hall in Urayasu, Chiba, Japan.

=== Results ===
Main Card
Weight class				Method	Round	Time	Notes
Openweight	Yuki Kondo (c)	def.	Kiuma Kunioku	KO (Flying Knee and Palm Strikes)	1	0:34	(Note: For The Pancrase Openweight Championship.)
	Masakatsu Funaki	def.	Tony Petarra	Submission (Punches)	1	1:16
	Ryushi Yanagisawa	vs.	Akira Shoji	Draw	1	15:00
	Sanae Kikuta	def.	Eddy Millis	Submission (Punches)	1	1:57
	Kosei Kubota	def.	Susumu Yamasaki	Decision (Unanimous)	1	10:00
	Semmy Schilt	def.	Ikuhisa Minowa	Decision (Unanimous)	1	10:00
	Kazuo Takahashi	def.	Osami Shibuya	Submission (Guillotine Choke)	1	6:08

== Pancrase: Breakthrough 9 ==
Pancrase: Breakthrough 9
- Date: October 25, 1999
- Venue: Korakuen Hall
- City: Tokyo, Japan

Pancrase: Breakthrough 9 was an event held on October 25, 1999, at Korakuen Hall in Tokyo, Japan.

=== Results ===
Main Card
Weight class				Method	Round	Time	Notes
	Ikuhisa Minowa	def.	Adrian Serrano	Submission (Heel Hook)	1	11:38
	Sanae Kikuta	vs.	Travis Fulton	Draw	1	15:00
	Kosei Kubota	def.	John Alessio	Submission (Kimura)	1	10:53
	Genki Sudo	def.	Victor Hunsaker	Submission (Elbows)	1	1:43
	Osami Shibuya	def.	Daisuke Watanabe	Decision (Unanimous)	1	10:00
	Daisuke Ishii	def.	Katsuomi Inagaki	Decision (Unanimous)	2	3:00

== Pancrase: Breakthrough 10 ==
Pancrase: Breakthrough 10
- Date: November 28, 1999
- Venue: Namihaya Dome
- City: Kadoma, Osaka, Japan

Pancrase: Breakthrough 10 was an event held on November 28, 1999, at the Namihaya Dome in Kadoma, Osaka, Japan.

=== Results ===
Main Card
Weight class				Method	Round	Time	Notes
Openweight	Semmy Schilt	def.	Yuki Kondo (c)	Submission (Rear-Naked Choke)	1	2:28	(Note: For The Pancrase Openweight Championship.)
	Osami Shibuya	vs.	Manabu Yamada	Draw	1	15:00
	Bob Stines	def.	Ryushi Yanagisawa	TKO (Punches)	1	1:53
	Shonie Carter	vs.	Takafumi Ito	Draw	1	15:00
	Daisuke Watanabe	def.	Leslie Allen	Submission (Armbar)	1	4:44
	Daisuke Ishii	def.	Kosei Kubota	Decision (Unanimous)	1	10:00

== Pancrase: Breakthrough 11 ==
Pancrase: Breakthrough 11
- Date: December 18, 1999
- Venue: Yokohama Cultural Gymnasium
- City: Yokohama, Kanagawa, Japan

Pancrase: Breakthrough 11 was an event held on December 18, 1999, at the Yokohama Cultural Gymnasium in Yokohama, Kanagawa, Japan.

=== Results ===
Main Card
Weight class				Method	Round	Time	Notes
	Sanae Kikuta	def.	Minoru Suzuki	Technical Submission (Arm-Triangle Choke)	1	2:39
	Kazuo Takahashi	def.	John Cronk	Submission (Elbows and Headbutts)	1	7:59
	Kiuma Kunioku	def.	Lane Andrews	Submission (Armbar)	1	14:44
	Ikuhisa Minowa	vs.	Chris Lytle	Draw	1	15:00
	Genki Sudo	def.	Nate Marquardt	Submission (Armbar)	1	13:31
	Hiroshi Ota	def.	Katsuomi Inagaki	Decision (Unanimous)	1	10:00
	Kosei Kubota	def.	Leslie Allen	Decision (Unanimous)	1	10:00

== See also ==
- Pancrase
- List of Pancrase champions
- List of Pancrase events
