= 1998 in Pancrase =

Mixed martial arts events

Information
- First date: January 16, 1998
- Last date: December 19, 1998

Events
- Total events: 15

Fights
- Total fights: 99
- Title fights: 3

Chronology
1997 in Pancrase	1998 in Pancrase	1999 in Pancrase

The year 1998 was the sixth year in the history of Pancrase, a mixed martial arts promotion based in Japan. In 1998 Pancrase held 14 events beginning with Pancrase: Alive 1.

== Title fights ==
Title fights in 1998
Weight class				Method	Round	Time	Event	Notes
Openweight	Guy Mezger	def.	Masakatsu Funaki (c)	Decision (Unanimous)	1	30:00	Pancrase: Advance 5	(Note: For The Pancrase Openweight Championship.)
Openweight	Guy Mezger (c)	def.	Ryushi Yanagisawa	Decision (Lost Points)	1	30:00	Pancrase: 1998 Anniversary Show	(Note: For The Pancrase Openweight Championship.)
Openweight	Guy Mezger (c)	def.	Yuki Kondo	Decision (Majority)	1	20:00	Pancrase: Advance 12	(Note: For The Pancrase Openweight Championship.)

== Events list ==
#	Event title	Date	Arena	Location
66	Pancrase: Advance 12	December 19, 1998	Tokyo Bay NK Hall	Urayasu, Chiba, Japan
65	Pancrase: Advance 11	November 29, 1998	Umeda Stella Hall	Osaka, Osaka, Japan
64	Pancrase: Advance 10	October 26, 1998	Korakuen Hall	Tokyo, Japan
63	Pancrase: Advance 9	October 4, 1998	Korakuen Hall	Tokyo, Japan
62	Pancrase: 1998 Anniversary Show	September 14, 1998	Japanese Martial Arts Building	Tokyo, Japan
61	Pancrase: 1998 Neo-Blood Tournament Second Round	July 26, 1998	Aomori Prefectural Gymnasium	Aomori, Japan
60	Pancrase: 1998 Neo-Blood Tournament Opening Round	July 7, 1998	Korakuen Hall	Tokyo, Japan
59	Pancrase: Advance 8	June 21, 1998	Kobe Fashion Mart	Kobe, Hyogo, Japan
58	Pancrase: Advance 7	June 2, 1998	Korakuen Hall	Tokyo, Japan
57	Pancrase: Advance 6	May 12, 1998	Korakuen Hall	Tokyo, Japan
56	Pancrase: Advance 5	April 26, 1998	Yokohama Cultural Gymnasium	Yokohama, Kanagawa, Japan
55	Pancrase: Advance 4	March 18, 1998	Korakuen Hall	Tokyo, Japan
54	Pancrase: Advance 3	March 1, 1998	Kobe Fashion Mart	Kobe, Hyogo, Japan
53	Pancrase: Advance 2	February 6, 1998	Yokohama Cultural Gymnasium	Yokohama, Kanagawa, Japan
52	Pancrase: Advance 1	January 16, 1998	Korakuen Hall	Tokyo, Japan

== Pancrase: Advance 1 ==
Pancrase: Advance 1
- Date: January 16, 1998
- Venue: Korakuen Hall
- City: Tokyo, Japan

Pancrase: Advance 1 was an event held on January 16, 1998, at Korakuen Hall in Tokyo, Japan.

=== Results ===
Main Card
Weight class				Method	Round	Time	Notes
	Semmy Schilt	def.	Minoru Suzuki	KO (Knee)	1	9:52
	Ryushi Yanagisawa	def.	Jason Godsey	KO (Knee)	1	3:14
	Osami Shibuya	def.	Keiichiro Yamamiya	Submission (Toe Hold)	1	17:31
	Jason DeLucia	def.	Takafumi Ito	Decision (Lost Points)	1	10:00
	Kiuma Kunioku	def.	Kosei Kubota	Submission (Armbar)	1	7:52
	Katsuomi Inagaki	def.	Jong Wang Kim	Submission (Armbar)	1	4:39
	Satoshi Hasegawa	def.	Ikuhisa Minowa	Submission (Toe Hold)	2	1:10

== Pancrase: Advance 2 ==
Pancrase: Advance 2
- Date: February 6, 1998
- Venue: Yokohama Cultural Gymnasium
- City: Yokohama, Kanagawa, Japan

Pancrase: Advance 2 was an event held on February 6, 1998, at the Yokohama Cultural Gymnasium in Yokohama, Kanagawa, Japan.

=== Results ===
Main Card
Weight class				Method	Round	Time	Notes
	Masakatsu Funaki	def.	Katsuomi Inagaki	Submission (Kimura)	1	2:36
	Takafumi Ito	def.	Takaku Fuke	Decision (Unanimous)	2	3:00
	Osami Shibuya	def.	Kazuo Takahashi	Submission (Kneebar)	1	9:35
	Kiuma Kunioku	vs.	Yuki Kondo	Draw (Majority)	2	3:00
	Ryushi Yanagisawa	def.	Keiichiro Yamamiya	Draw (Unanimous)	2	3:00
	Satoshi Hasegawa	def.	Semmy Schilt	Submission (Ankle Lock)	1	3:56
	Tony Rojo	def.	Jong Wang Kim	Submission (Guillotine Choke)	1	2:11

== Pancrase: Advance 3 ==
Pancrase: Advance 3
- Date: March 1, 1998
- Venue: Kobe Fashion Mart
- City: Kobe, Hyogo, Japan

Pancrase: Advance 3 was an event held on March 1, 1998, at the Kobe Fashion Mart in Kobe, Hyogo, Japan.

=== Results ===
Main Card
Weight class				Method	Round	Time	Notes
	Keiichiro Yamamiya	def.	Minoru Suzuki	Decision (Majority)	1	20:00
	Kiuma Kunioku	def.	Osami Shibuya	Decision (Majority)	1	20:00
	Jason DeLucia	def.	Satoshi Hasegawa	TKO (Doctor Stoppage)	1	0:55
	Katsuomi Inagaki	vs.	Takaku Fuke	Draw (Majority)	2	3:00
	Takafumi Ito	def.	Jong Wang Kim	Submission (Ankle Lock)	1	2:06
	Kosei Kubota	def.	Haygar Chin	Submission (Armbar)	1	6:48

== Pancrase: Advance 4 ==
Pancrase: Advance 4
- Date: March 18, 1998
- Venue: Korakuen Hall
- City: Tokyo, Japan

Pancrase: Advance 4 was an event held on March 18, 1998, at Korakuen Hall in Tokyo, Japan.

=== Results ===
Main Card
Weight class				Method	Round	Time	Notes
	Masakatsu Funaki	def.	Semmy Schilt	Decision (Lost Points)	1	15:00
	Guy Mezger	def.	Ryushi Yanagisawa	Decision (Unanimous)	1	20:00
	Kazuo Takahashi	def.	Leon van Dijk	Decision (Unanimous)	2	3:00
	Katsuomi Inagaki	def.	Takafumi Ito	Decision (Lost Points)	1	10:00
	Justin McCully	vs.	Daisuke Ishii	Draw (Unanimous)	2	3:00
	Minoru Suzuki	def.	Kosei Kubota	Submission (Rear-Naked Choke)	1	3:38

== Pancrase: Advance 5 ==
Pancrase: Advance 5
- Date: April 26, 1998
- Venue: Yokohama Cultural Gymnasium
- City: Yokohama, Kanagawa, Japan

Pancrase: Advance 5 was an event held on April 26, 1998, at the Yokohama Cultural Gymnasium in Yokohama, Kanagawa, Japan.

=== Results ===
Main Card
Weight class				Method	Round	Time	Notes
Openweight	Guy Mezger	def.	Masakatsu Funaki (c)	Decision (Unanimous)	1	30:00	(Note: For The Pancrase Openweight Championship.)
	Yuki Kondo	def.	Keiichiro Yamamiya	Decision (Majority)	1	20:00
	Ryushi Yanagisawa	def.	Jason DeLucia	Submission (Toe Hold)	1	12:44
	Minoru Suzuki	def.	Tony Rojo	Decision (Unanimous)	2	3:00
	Semmy Schilt	def.	Jason Godsey	TKO (Doctor Stoppage)	1	1:47
	Adrian Serrano	def.	Kiuma Kunioku	Decision (Majority)	2	3:00
	Osami Shibuya	def.	Takaku Fuke	Decision (Unanimous)	2	3:00
	Satoshi Hasegawa	def.	Ikuhisa Minowa	Decision (Majority)	2	3:00

== Pancrase: Advance 6 ==
Pancrase: Advance 6
- Date: May 12, 1998
- Venue: Korakuen Hall
- City: Tokyo, Japan

Pancrase: Advance 6 was an event held on May 12, 1998, at Korakuen Hall in Tokyo, Japan.

=== Results ===
Main Card
Weight class				Method	Round	Time	Notes
	Semmy Schilt	def.	Kazuo Takahashi	TKO (Palm Strikes)	1	5:44
	Ryushi Yanagisawa	def.	Omar Bouiche	Submission (Ankle Lock)	1	2:35
	Keiichiro Yamamiya	def.	Takafumi Ito	TKO (Palm Strikes)	2	1:35
	Alex Andrade	def.	Osami Shibuya	Decision (Lost Points)	1	10:00
	Katsuomi Inagaki	def.	Wes Gassaway	Submission (Rear-Naked Choke)	2	0:51
	Satoshi Hasegawa	def.	Jong Wang Kim	Submission (Armbar)	1	2:01
	Kosei Kubota	def.	Daisuke Ishii	Decision (Majority)	2	3:00

== Pancrase: Advance 7 ==
Pancrase: Advance 7
- Date: June 2, 1998
- Venue: Korakuen Hall
- City: Tokyo, Japan

Pancrase: Advance 7 was an event held on June 2, 1998, at Korakuen Hall in Tokyo, Japan.

=== Results ===
Main Card
Weight class				Method	Round	Time	Notes
	Minoru Suzuki	def.	John Lober	Decision (Lost Points)	1	15:00
	Jason DeLucia	def.	Satoshi Hasegawa	Technical Submission (Straight Armbar)	1	6:14
	Leon van Dijk	def.	Kiuma Kunioku	KO (Head Kick)	1	3:57
	Tony Rojo	vs.	Takaku Fuke	Draw	2	3:00
	Ikuhisa Minowa	def.	Adrian Serrano	Decision (Lost Points)	1	10:00
	Kosei Kubota	def.	Brian Rainey	Submission (Rear-Naked Choke)	1	2:18

== Pancrase: Advance 8 ==
Pancrase: Advance 8
- Date: June 21, 1998
- Venue: Kobe Fashion Mart
- City: Kobe, Hyogo, Japan

Pancrase: Advance 8 was an event held on June 21, 1998, at the Kobe Fashion Mart in Kobe, Hyogo, Japan.

=== Results ===
Main Card
Weight class				Method	Round	Time	Notes
	Keiichiro Yamamiya	vs.	Ryushi Yanagisawa	Draw	2	3:00
	Katsuomi Inagaki	vs.	Kazuo Takahashi	Draw (Unanimous)	2	3:00
	Takafumi Ito	def.	Daisuke Ishii	Decision (Unanimous)	2	3:00
	Ikuhisa Minowa	vs.	Kosei Kubota	Draw (Split)	2	3:00
	Takaku Fuke	def.	Minoru Suzuki	Decision (Lost Points)	1	10:00
	Semmy Schilt	def.	Guy Mezger	KO (Palm Strikes)	1	13:15
	Jason Godsey	def.	Jong Wang Kim	Submission (Keylock)	1	2:03

== Pancrase: 1998 Neo-Blood Tournament Opening Round ==
Pancrase: 1998 Neo-Blood Tournament Opening Round
- Date: July 7, 1998
- Venue: Korakuen Hall
- City: Tokyo, Japan

Pancrase: 1998 Neo-Blood Tournament Opening Round was an event held on July 7, 1998, at Korakuen Hall in Tokyo, Japan.

=== Results ===
Main Card
Weight class				Method	Round	Time	Notes
	Justin Mccully	def.	Daisuke Ishii	Decision (Unanimous)	2	3:00
	Evan Tanner	def.	Kosei Kubota	Submission (Arm-Triangle Choke)	1	2:23
	Osami Shibuya	def.	Keiichiro Yamamiya	Decision (Unanimous)	1	20:00
	Satoshi Hasegawa	def.	Jason Godsey	Decision (Majority)	1	15:00
	Daisuke Ishii	def.	Ryan Stout	Decision (Split)	2	3:00
	Justin McCully	def.	Martin Emmen	Submission (Armbar)	1	1:34
	Kosei Kubota	def.	Jong Wang Kim	Submission (Kimura)	1	1:03
	Evan Tanner	def.	Ikuhisa Minowa	Submission (Arm-Triangle Choke)	1	4:05

== Pancrase: 1998 Neo-Blood Tournament Second Round ==
Pancrase: 1998 Neo-Blood Tournament Second Round
- Date: July 26, 1998
- Venue: Aomori Prefectural Gymnasium
- City: Aomori, Japan

Pancrase: 1998 Neo-Blood Tournament Second Round was an event held on July 26, 1998, at the Aomori Prefectural Gymnasium in Aomori, Japan.

=== Results ===
Main Card
Weight class				Method	Round	Time	Notes
	Masakatsu Funaki	def.	Osami Shibuya	Submission (Arm-Triangle Choke)	1	6:07
	Yuki Kondo	vs.	Ryushi Yanagisawa	Draw (Unanimous)	1	20:00
	Evan Tanner	def.	Justin McCully	Technical Submission (Kimura)	1	5:07
	Keiichiro Yamamiya	def.	Satoshi Hasegawa	Decision (Majority)	1	15:00
	Katsuomi Inagaki	def.	Daisuke Ishii	Decision (Unanimous)	2	3:00

== Pancrase: 1998 Anniversary Show ==
Pancrase: 1998 Anniversary Show
- Date: August 19, 1998
- Venue: Japanese Martial Arts Building
- City: Tokyo, Japan

Pancrase: 1998 Anniversary Show was an event held on September 14, 1998, at the Japanese Martial Arts Building in Tokyo, Japan.

=== Results ===
Main Card
Weight class				Method	Round	Time	Notes
Openweight	Guy Mezger (c)	def.	Ryushi Yanagisawa	Decision (Lost Points)	1	30:00	(Note: For The Pancrase Openweight Championship.)
	Semmy Schilt	def.	Masakatsu Funaki	KO (Punch to the Body)	1	7:13
	Kazuo Takahashi	def.	Minoru Suzuki	TKO (Palm Strikes)	1	8:06
	Bas Rutten	def.	Kengo Watanabe	TKO (Palm Strikes)	1	2:58
	Yuki Kondo	def.	Osami Shibuya	Decision (Split)	1	20:00
	Evan Tanner	def.	Kiuma Kunioku	Decision (Lost Points)	1	20:00
	Jason DeLucia	def.	Satoshi Hasegawa	Decision (Majority)	1	10:00
	Manabu Yamada	vs.	Katsuomi Inagaki	Draw (Unanimous)	2	3:00

== Pancrase: Advance 9 ==
Pancrase: Advance 9
- Date: October 4, 1998
- Venue: Korakuen Hall
- City: Tokyo, Japan

Pancrase: Advance 9 was an event held on October 4, 1998, at Korakuen Hall in Tokyo, Japan.

=== Results ===
Main Card
Weight class				Method	Round	Time	Notes
	Jason Godsey	def.	Kengo Watanabe	Submission (Rear-Naked Choke)	1	1:28
	Yuki Kondo	def.	Daisuke Ishii	Submission (Toe Hold)	1	2:38
	Osami Shibuya	def.	Katsuomi Inagaki	Decision (Unanimous)	1	10:00
	Ikuhisa Minowa	vs.	Travis Fulton	Draw (Unanimous)	2	3:00
	Kosei Kubota	def.	Satoshi Hasegawa	Decision (Majority)	1	10:00

== Pancrase: Advance 10 ==
Pancrase: Advance 10
- Date: October 26, 1998
- Venue: Korakuen Hall
- City: Tokyo, Japan

Pancrase: Advance 10 was an event held on October 26, 1998, at Korakuen Hall in Tokyo, Japan.

=== Results ===
Main Card
Weight class				Method	Round	Time	Notes
	Kiuma Kunioku	def.	Masakatsu Funaki	Decision (Lost Points)	1	15:00
	Keiichiro Yamamiya	def.	Jason DeLucia	Decision (Lost Points)	1	15:00
	Omar Bouiche	def.	Minoru Suzuki	Submission (Rear-Naked Choke)	1	0:45
	Manabu Yamada	def.	Daisuke Watanabe	Submission (Rear-Naked Choke)	1	7:33
	Osami Shibuya	def.	Kosei Kubota	Decision (Unanimous)	1	10:00
	Ikuhisa Minowa	def.	Daisuke Ishii	Decision (Unanimous)	1	10:00

== Pancrase: Advance 11 ==
Pancrase: Advance 11
- Date: November 29, 1998
- Venue: Umeda Stella Hall
- City: Osaka, Osaka, Japan

Pancrase: Advance 11 was an event held on November 29, 1998, at Umeda Stella Hall in Osaka, Osaka, Japan.

=== Results ===
Main Card
Weight class				Method	Round	Time	Notes
	Katsuomi Inagaki	def.	Kengo Watanabe	Decision (Majority)	1	10:00
	Kiuma Kunioku	def.	Daisuke Ishii	Decision (Unanimous)	1	10:00
	Ryushi Yanagisawa	def.	Kosei Kubota	Submission (Toe Hold)	1	2:35
	Ikuhisa Minowa	def.	Satoshi Hasegawa	Submission (Armbar)	1	2:43
	Takafumi Ito	def.	Daisuke Watanabe	Decision (Unanimous)	2	3:00

== Pancrase: Advance 12 ==
Pancrase: Advance 12
- Date: December 19, 1998
- Venue: Tokyo Bay NK Hall
- City: Urayasu, Chiba, Japan

Pancrase: Advance 12 was an event held on December 19, 1998, at the Tokyo Bay NK Hall in Urayasu, Chiba, Japan.

=== Results ===
Main Card
Weight class				Method	Round	Time	Notes
Openweight	Guy Mezger (c)	def.	Yuki Kondo	Decision (Majority)	1	20:00	(Note: For The Pancrase Openweight Championship.)
	Masakatsu Funaki	def.	John Renken	Submission (Punches)	1	5:50
	Kengo Watanabe	vs.	John Lober	Draw (Time Limit)	1	15:00
	Keiichiro Yamamiya	vs.	Jeremy Horn	Draw (Time Limit)	1	15:00
	Evan Tanner	def.	Ryushi Yanagisawa	Submission (Arm-Triangle Choke)	1	2:24
	Osami Shibuya	def.	Minoru Suzuki	TKO (Hip Injury)	1	2:31
	Jason DeLucia	def.	Manabu Yamada	Submission (Armbar)	1	1:13
	Daisuke Ishii	def.	Minoru Toyonaga	Decision (Unanimous)	1	10:00

== See also ==
- Pancrase
- List of Pancrase champions
- List of Pancrase events
