= Kiuma Kunioku =

Japanese mixed martial arts fighter

Kiuma Kunioku 國奥麒馬
- Born: November 12, 1976 (age 49); Osaka, Japan
- Nationality: Japanese
- Height: 5 ft 8 in (1.73 m)
- Weight: 165 lb (75 kg; 11.8 st)
- Division: Middleweight; Welterweight; Lightweight
- Style: Catch Wrestling, Boxing, Muay Thai, Brazilian Jiu-Jitsu
- Fighting out of: Tokyo, Japan

Mixed martial arts record
- Total: 68
- Wins: 34
- By knockout: 3
- By submission: 13
- By decision: 18
- Losses: 25
- By knockout: 7
- By submission: 4
- By decision: 14
- Draws: 9

Other information
- Mixed martial arts record from Sherdog

Kiuma Kunioku (Japanese: 國奥 麒樹真, Kunioku Kiuma; born November 12, 1976) is a retired Japanese mixed martial artist. A longtime veteran of the Pancrase organization, Kunioku captured the King of Pancrase Middleweight Championship and King of Pancrase Welterweight Championship before leaving the organization in 2004 to compete in the K-1 HERO'S mixed martial arts organization. He holds notable victories over Guy Mezger, Frank Shamrock, Nate Marquardt, Masakatsu Funaki, Yuki Kondo, John Lober and Genki Sudo.

Kunioku has fought in Pancrase on 55 different occasions. He has also competed in the Abu Dhabi Professional Submission Grappling Tournament in 2003, but did not place.

Kunioku was scheduled to face Vincent Latoel at Fury 2 on October 9, 2010, in Macau. However, Kunioku was later removed from the card and the event was cancelled entirely on October 7.

He replaced Leonardo Santos in a bout with Maximo Blanco at Sengoku Raiden Championship 15 on October 30, 2010. Kunioku lost the fight by KO late in the first round.

== Background ==
In 1992, at the same time as graduating from junior high school, he joined the professional wrestling Fujiwara group led by Yoshiaki Fujiwara and became a trainee. With the launch of Pancrase in 1993, Kunioku also belonged to Pancrase as a trainee. At that time, he worked under the name Kunioku Shoryu (國奥将竜).

== Championships and accomplishments ==
- Pancrase
  - King of Pancrase Middleweight Championship (One time)
  - King of Pancrase Welterweight Championship (One time)
- Fight Matrix
  - Highest Quarterly Ranking: 7/01/2000, #1 Middleweight

== Mixed martial arts record ==
Professional record breakdown
| 68 matches | 34 wins | 25 losses |
| By knockout | 3 | 7 |
| By submission | 13 | 4 |
| By decision | 18 | 14 |
| Draws | 9 | |

| Res. | Record | Opponent | Method | Event | Date | Round | Time | Location | Notes |
|---|---|---|---|---|---|---|---|---|---|
| Loss | 34–25–9 | Ramazan Esenbaev | Decision (majority) | IGF: Inoki Bom-Ba-Ye 2014 | December 31, 2014 | 3 | 5:00 | Tokyo, Japan | |
| Loss | 34–24–9 | Maximo Blanco | KO (punches) | World Victory Road Presents: Sengoku Raiden Championships 15 | October 30, 2010 | 1 | 4:26 | Tokyo, Japan | |
| Loss | 34–23–9 | Leonardo Santos | Submission (rear-naked choke) | World Victory Road Presents: Sengoku Raiden Championships 12 | March 7, 2010 | 1 | 3:06 | Tokyo, Japan | |
| Win | 34–22–9 | A Sol Kwon | Decision (unanimous) | World Victory Road Presents: Sengoku 5 | September 28, 2008 | 3 | 5:00 | Tokyo, Japan | Return to Lightweight. |
| Win | 33–22–9 | Jay Ellis | Submission (toe hold) | FCC 35: Freestyle Combat Challenge 35 | May 3, 2008 | 1 | 1:47 | Racine, Wisconsin, United States | |
| Win | 32–22–9 | David Love | TKO (punches) | FCC 34: Freestyle Combat Challenge 34 | March 29, 2008 | 2 | N/A | Kenosha, Wisconsin, United States | Lightweight bout. |
| Draw | 31–22–9 | Seichi Ikemoto | Draw | Deep: 32 Impact | October 10, 2007 | 2 | 5:00 | Tokyo, Japan | |
| Draw | 31–22–8 | Jutaro Nakao | Draw | Deep: 30 Impact | July 8, 2007 | 3 | 5:00 | Osaka, Japan | |
| Loss | 31–22–7 | Fabricio Monteiro | Submission (rear-naked choke) | Deep: 27 Impact | December 20, 2006 | 1 | 4:41 | Tokyo, Japan | |
| Loss | 31–21–7 | Antonio McKee | Decision (unanimous) | Hero's 4 | March 15, 2006 | 2 | 5:00 | Tokyo, Japan | Return to Welterweight. |
| Win | 31–20–7 | Jung Hwan Cha | Submission (rear-naked choke) | Hero's 2005 in Seoul | November 5, 2005 | 1 | 2:01 | Seoul, South Korea | |
| Loss | 30–20–7 | Akira Kikuchi | Decision (unanimous) | Hero's 3 | September 7, 2005 | 3 | 5:00 | Tokyo, Japan | |
| Loss | 30–19–7 | Rodrigo Gracie | Decision (unanimous) | Hero's 2 | July 6, 2005 | 2 | 5:00 | Tokyo, Japan | Lightweight debut. |
| Loss | 30–18–7 | Izuru Takeuchi | Decision (majority) | Pancrase: Brave 4 | April 23, 2004 | 3 | 5:00 | Tokyo, Japan | |
| Loss | 30–17–7 | Kazuo Misaki | TKO (doctor stoppage) | Pancrase: Brave 1 | February 6, 2004 | 2 | 1:31 | Tokyo, Japan | |
| Win | 30–16–7 | Kenichi Serizawa | Decision (unanimous) | Pancrase - Hybrid 10 | November 30, 2003 | 3 | 5:00 | Tokyo, Japan | Defended the Pancrase Welterweight Championship. |
| Loss | 29–16–7 | Crosley Gracie | Decision (unanimous) | Pancrase - 10th Anniversary Show | August 31, 2003 | 2 | 5:00 | Tokyo, Japan | |
| Win | 29–15–7 | Katsuomi Inagaki | Submission (rear-naked choke) | Pancrase - Hybrid 7 | June 22, 2003 | 1 | 4:10 | Osaka, Japan | |
| Win | 28–15–7 | Hidetaka Monma | Decision (unanimous) | Pancrase - Hybrid 4 | April 12, 2003 | 2 | 5:00 | Tokyo, Japan | |
| Loss | 27–15–7 | Nate Marquardt | KO (flying knee) | Pancrase: Spirit 9 | December 21, 2002 | 3 | 4:36 | Tokyo, Japan | Return to Middleweight. Lost the Pancrase Middleweight Championship. |
| Win | 27–14–7 | Hiroki Nagaoka | Submission (rear-naked choke) | Pancrase: 2002 Anniversary Show | September 29, 2002 | 3 | 4:36 | Yokohama, Japan | Defended the Pancrase Welterweight Championship. |
| Win | 26–14–7 | Takafumi Ito | Submission (armbar) | Pancrase: 2002 Neo-Blood Tournament Second Round | July 28, 2002 | 1 | 4:59 | Tokyo, Japan | Won the inaugural Pancrase Welterweight Championship. |
| Win | 25–14–7 | Koji Oishi | Decision (unanimous) | Pancrase: 2002 Neo-Blood Tournament Opening Round | July 28, 2002 | 3 | 5:00 | Tokyo, Japan | |
| Win | 24–14–7 | Hideaki Iwasaki | Decision (Unanimous) | Pancrase: Spirit 5 | May 28, 2002 | 2 | 5:00 | Tokyo, Japan | Welterweight debut. |
| Win | 23–14–7 | Nate Marquardt | Decision (majority) | Pancrase: Proof 7 | December 1, 2001 | 3 | 5:00 | Yokohama, Japan | Won the Pancrase Middleweight Championship. |
| Win | 22–14–7 | Ryuki Ueyama | Decision (majority) | Pancrase: 2001 Anniversary Show | September 30, 2001 | 2 | 5:00 | Yokohama, Japan | |
| Draw | 21–14–7 | Sean Sherk | Draw | Pancrase: 2001 Neo-Blood Tournament Second Round | July 29, 2001 | 3 | 5:00 | Tokyo, Japan | |
| Win | 21–14–6 | Mathieu Nicourt | Submission (kimura) | Pancrase: Proof 4 | June 26, 2001 | 2 | 3:35 | Tokyo, Japan | |
| Win | 20–14–6 | Daiju Takase | Decision (majority) | Pancrase: Proof 2 | March 31, 2001 | 3 | 5:00 | Kadoma, Osaka, Japan | |
| Draw | 19–14–6 | Nate Marquardt | Draw | Pancrase: Trans 7 | December 4, 2000 | 1 | 20:00 | Tokyo, Japan | For the Pancrase Middleweight Championship. |
| Loss | 19–14–5 | Nate Marquardt | Decision (unanimous) | Pancrase: 2000 Anniversary Show | September 24, 2000 | 1 | 10:00 | Yokohama, Japan | |
| Win | 19–13–5 | Matt Lee | Submission (armbar) | Pancrase: Trans 4 | June 26, 2000 | 1 | 4:15 | Tokyo, Japan | |
| Draw | 18–13–5 | Shonie Carter | Draw | Pancrase: Trans 3 | April 30, 2000 | 2 | 3:00 | Yokohama, Japan | |
| Win | 18–13–4 | Genki Sudo | Decision (unanimous) | Pancrase: Trans 2 | February 27, 2000 | 2 | 3:00 | Osaka, Japan | Middleweight debut. |
| Win | 17–13–4 | Lane Andrews | Submission (armbar) | Pancrase: Breakthrough 11 | December 18, 1999 | 1 | 14:44 | Yokohama, Japan | |
| Loss | 16–13–4 | Yuki Kondo | KO (flying knee and palm strikes) | Pancrase: 1999 Anniversary Show | September 18, 1999 | 1 | 0:34 | Urayasu, Chiba, Japan | For the Pancrase Openweight Championship. |
| Win | 16–12–4 | Keiichiro Yamamiya | Decision (lost points) | Pancrase: Breakthrough 5 | May 23, 1999 | 1 | 15:00 | Nagoya, Aichi, Japan | |
| Win | 15–12–4 | Yuki Kondo | Decision (unanimous) | Pancrase: Breakthrough 3 | March 9, 1999 | 1 | 15:00 | Tokyo, Japan | |
| Win | 14–12–4 | Daisuke Watanabe | Technical Submission (kimura) | Pancrase: Breakthrough 2 | February 11, 1999 | 1 | 3:58 | Osaka, Japan | |
| Loss | 13–12–4 | Jason DeLucia | Decision (lost points) | Pancrase: Breakthrough 1 | January 19, 1999 | 1 | 15:00 | Tokyo, Japan | |
| Win | 13–11–4 | Daisuke Ishii | Decision (unanimous) | Pancrase: Advance 11 | November 29, 1998 | 1 | 10:00 | Osaka, Japan | |
| Win | 12–11–4 | Masakatsu Funaki | Decision (lost points) | Pancrase: Advance 10 | October 26, 1998 | 1 | 15:00 | Tokyo, Japan | |
| Loss | 11–11–4 | Evan Tanner | Decision (lost points) | Pancrase: 1998 Anniversary Show | September 14, 1998 | 1 | 20:00 | Tokyo, Japan | |
| Loss | 11–10–4 | Leon van Dijk | KO (head kick) | Pancrase: Advance 7 | June 2, 1998 | 1 | 3:57 | Tokyo, Japan | |
| Loss | 11–9–4 | Adrian Serrano | Decision (majority) | Pancrase: Advance 5 | April 26, 1998 | 2 | 3:00 | Yokohama, Japan | |
| Win | 11–8–4 | Osami Shibuya | Decision (majority) | Pancrase: Advance 3 | March 1, 1998 | 1 | 20:00 | Kobe, Hyogo, Japan | |
| Draw | 10–8–4 | Yuki Kondo | Draw (majority) | Pancrase: Advance 2 | February 6, 1998 | 2 | 3:00 | Yokohama, Japan | |
| Win | 10–8–3 | Kosei Kubota | Submission (armbar) | Pancrase: Advance 1 | January 16, 1998 | 1 | 7:52 | Tokyo, Japan | |
| Loss | 9–8–3 | Jong Wang Kim | Technical Submission (guillotine choke) | Pancrase: Alive 11 | December 20, 1997 | 1 | 0:21 | Yokohama, Japan | |
| Loss | 9–7–3 | Guy Mezger | KO (head kick) | Pancrase: Alive 9 | October 29, 1997 | 1 | 11:12 | Tokyo, Japan | |
| Win | 9–6–3 | John Lober | Decision (lost points) | Pancrase: 1997 Anniversary Show | September 6, 1997 | 1 | 10:00 | Urayasu, Chiba, Japan | |
| Win | 8–6–3 | Satoshi Hasegawa | Submission (toe hold) | Pancrase: Alive 8 | August 9, 1997 | 1 | 9:07 | Osaka, Japan | |
| Loss | 7–6–3 | Jason DeLucia | TKO (doctor stoppage) | Pancrase: Alive 6 | June 18, 1997 | 1 | 18:51 | Tokyo, Japan | |
| Draw | 7–5–3 | Keiichiro Yamamiya | Draw (majority) | Pancrase: Alive 5 | May 24, 1997 | 1 | 10:00 | Kobe, Hyogo, Japan | |
| Loss | 7–5–2 | Bas Rutten | Decision (lost points) | Pancrase: Alive 4 | April 27, 1997 | 1 | 15:00 | Urayasu, Chiba, Japan | |
| Win | 7–4–2 | Haygar Chin | Submission (armbar) | Pancrase: Alive 3 | March 22, 1997 | 1 | 7:44 | Nagoya, Aichi, Japan | |
| Loss | 6–4–2 | Yuki Kondo | Decision (split) | Pancrase: Alive 1 | January 17, 1997 | 1 | 20:00 | Tokyo, Japan | |
| Win | 6–3–2 | Frank Shamrock | Decision (unanimous) | Pancrase: Truth 10 | December 15, 1996 | 1 | 20:00 | Tokyo, Japan | |
| Win | 5–3–2 | Satoshi Hasegawa | TKO (palm strikes) | Pancrase: Truth 9 | November 9, 1996 | 1 | 6:32 | Kobe, Hyogo, Japan | |
| Win | 4–3–2 | Keiichiro Yamamiya | Submission (armbar) | Pancrase: Truth 8 | October 22, 1996 | 1 | 1:38 | Tokyo, Japan | |
| Win | 3–3–2 | Guy Mezger | Decision (split) | Pancrase: Truth 7 | October 8, 1996 | 1 | 10:00 | Nagoya, Aichi, Japan | |
| Loss | 2–3–2 | Manabu Yamada | Submission (guillotine choke) | Pancrase: 1996 Anniversary Show | September 7, 1996 | 1 | 8:29 | Chiba, Japan | |
| Loss | 2–2–2 | Pete Williams | Decision (unanimous) | Pancrase: 1996 Neo-Blood Tournament, Round 1 | July 22, 1996 | 1 | 10:00 | Tokyo, Japan | |
| Win | 2–1–2 | Takafumi Ito | Decision (lost points) | Pancrase: Truth 6 | June 25, 1996 | 1 | 10:00 | Fukuoka, Japan | |
| Draw | 1–1–2 | Yuki Kondo | Draw (majority) | Pancrase: Truth 5 | May 16, 1996 | 1 | 10:00 | Tokyo, Japan | |
| Loss | 1–1–1 | Jason DeLucia | Decision (lost points) | Pancrase: Truth 4 | April 8, 1996 | 1 | 15:00 | Tokyo, Japan | |
| Win | 1–0–1 | Takafumi Ito | TKO (palm strikes) | Pancrase: Truth 2 | March 2, 1996 | 1 | 0:54 | Kobe, Hyogo, Japan | |
| Draw | 0–0–1 | Osami Shibuya | Draw (split) | Pancrase: Truth 1 | January 28, 1996 | 1 | 10:00 | Yokohama, Japan | |

== Submission grappling record ==
KO PUNCHES

| Result | Opponent | Method | Event | Date | Round | Time | Notes |
|---|---|---|---|---|---|---|---|
| Loss | (Brazil) Marcelo García | | ADCC 2003 –77 kg | 2003 | 1 | | |

== See also ==
- List of male mixed martial artists
