= Brian Gassaway =

American mixed martial arts fighter (1972–2021)

- Born: August 7, 1972; Urbana, Ohio, U.S.
- Died: October 16, 2021 (aged 49); Chicago, Illinois, U.S.
- Other names: Mandingo
- Height: 6 ft 0 in (1.83 m)
- Weight: 170 lb (77 kg; 12 st)
- Division: Heavyweight; Light Heavyweight; Middleweight; Welterweight; Lightweight
- Stance: Orthodox
- Fighting out of: Chicago, Illinois, United States
- Team: Chicago Mixed Martial Arts
- Years active: 1996–2010

Mixed martial arts record
- Total: 52
- Wins: 29
- By knockout: 6
- By submission: 11
- By decision: 10
- Unknown: 2
- Losses: 20
- By knockout: 1
- By submission: 11
- By decision: 7
- Unknown: 1
- Draws: 2
- No contests: 1

Other information
- Mixed martial arts record from Sherdog

Brian Gassaway (August 7, 1972 – October 16, 2021) was an American mixed martial artist who competed professionally from 1996 to 2010, taking roughly 52 professional bouts in weight classes ranging from lightweight to heavyweight. Based in Chicago, he fought for the UFC, Bellator, World Extreme Cagefighting (WEC), King of the Cage, Shooto, and Pancrase, facing opponents including Diego Sanchez, Yuki Kondo, Ikuhisa Minowa, John Alessio, Mike Pyle, and Jose Landi-Jons. Obituaries described him as a pioneer of the Midwestern mixed martial arts scene.

After retiring, Gassaway became a founding partner and coach at the Chicago Mixed Martial Arts gym, and he was inducted into the Illinois Martial Arts Hall of Fame in March 2018. He died in October 2021 at the age of 49; following his death, the Thai Boxing Association-Sanctioning Authority created the Brian Gassaway Award in recognition of his contributions to American Muay Thai.

== Background ==
Gassaway was born on August 7, 1972, and was originally from Urbana, Ohio; he later settled in the Chicago area, where he lived in Chicago and Glenwood, Illinois. In addition to his mixed martial arts career, he competed in kickboxing and Muay Thai.

== Mixed martial arts career ==
=== Early career ===
Gassaway made his professional debut on August 23, 1996, at IFC 2: Mayhem in Mississippi, a one-night tournament in which he submitted Michael Pacholik and William Knorr with rear-naked chokes before losing to Anthony Macias by kneebar. He fought prolifically in his first year as a professional, appearing ten times between April and July 1996 alone, and traveled to Japan and Brazil in 1997 for bouts in Pancrase and at the International Vale Tudo Championship.

From 1998 to early 2000 Gassaway went unbeaten in 14 consecutive bouts. During the streak he won three fights in a single night at Cage Combat 3 in Ohio on July 15, 1998 – including a decision over Travis Fulton – and took a split decision over Mark Hughes, the twin brother of Matt Hughes, in Hughes's professional debut in April 1999.

=== Japan ===
Gassaway competed repeatedly in Japan. After dropping decisions and submissions in Pancrase in 1997, he returned to the promotion in 2000, winning two decisions in one night at Pancrase: Trans 5 in Tokyo before losing to Ikuhisa Minowa by toe hold at the promotion's anniversary show in Yokohama. In 2001 he was submitted by Yuki Kondo, and in 2003 he lost a unanimous decision to Tetsuji Kato at Korakuen Hall in his final Shooto appearance in Japan. Later that year, at a Shooto event in Indiana, he fought then-unbeaten Gideon Ray to a draw.

=== UFC and WEC ===
Gassaway made his WEC debut at WEC 14 in March 2005; his bout with Ross Ebañez was ruled a no contest after an accidental headbutt. Two regional submission wins later, he received his lone UFC booking, meeting Diego Sanchez – then unbeaten and making his first pay-per-view appearance since winning The Ultimate Fighter – at UFC 54 in Las Vegas on August 20, 2005. Sanchez controlled the fight on the ground and stopped Gassaway with strikes from mount in the second round.

In 2006 Gassaway headlined promoter Monte Cox's Extreme Challenge 68 in Wisconsin, winning a unanimous decision over Jamie Toney. He returned to the WEC at WEC 25 in January 2007, where he was submitted by John Alessio in the first round.

=== Later career ===
At TKO 32 in Montreal in February 2008, Gassaway defeated Brazilian vale tudo veteran Jose Landi-Jons by technical knockout when Landi-Jons broke his leg throwing a kick that Gassaway checked; Sherdog later ranked the injury among the most gruesome leg breaks in MMA history. After losses to Forrest Petz and Mike Pyle later that year, Gassaway, then 38, won his final fight at Bellator 25 in Chicago in August 2010, taking a unanimous decision over fellow local fighter Kevin Knabjian. One month later, in his last professional bout, he was submitted in under two minutes by Shungo Oyama at Martial Combat 10 in Singapore.

== Retirement and coaching ==
After retiring from competition, Gassaway became a founding partner, teacher, and coach at the Chicago Mixed Martial Arts gym in Chicago's Lincoln Park neighborhood. He cornered and trained Chicago-area fighters, among them UFC veteran Shonie Carter, and was remembered by peers as a mentor to his students. He was inducted into the Illinois Martial Arts Hall of Fame in March 2018.

== Death ==
Gassaway died on October 16, 2021, at the age of 49. His death was announced publicly the following day, and several media reports gave the date as October 17; no cause of death was made public. Fighters, coaches, and broadcasters paid tribute, and a memorial fund was organized by one of his students. Following his death, the Thai Boxing Association-Sanctioning Authority established the Brian Gassaway Award, honoring his contribution to Muay Thai in the United States. He was survived by his wife, son, mother, and brother.

== Championships and accomplishments ==
- Illinois Martial Arts Hall of Fame, inductee (2018)
- Thai Boxing Association-Sanctioning Authority – Brian Gassaway Award established in his honor (2021)

== Mixed martial arts record ==
Professional record breakdown
52 matches	29 wins	20 losses
By knockout	6	1
By submission	11	11
By decision	10	7
Unknown	2	1
Draws	2	
No contests	1	

Res.	Record	Opponent	Method	Event	Date	Round	Time	Location	Notes
Loss	29–20–2 (1)	Shungo Oyama	Technical Submission (inverted triangle choke)	MC: Martial Combat 10	September 16, 2010	1	1:50	Sentosa, Singapore	
Win	29–19–2 (1)	Kevin Knabjian	Decision (unanimous)	Bellator 25	August 19, 2010	3	5:00	Chicago, Illinois, United States	
Loss	28–19–2 (1)	Mike Pyle	Submission (armbar)	SuperFights MMA: Night of Combat 2	October 11, 2008	1	4:21	Las Vegas, Nevada, United States	
Loss	28–18–2 (1)	Forrest Petz	Decision (unanimous)	Adrenaline MMA: Guida vs. Russow	June 14, 2008	3	5:00	Chicago, Illinois, United States	
Win	28–17–2 (1)	Jose Landi-Jons	TKO (broken leg)	TKO 32: Ultimatum	February 28, 2008	2	0:50	Montreal, Quebec, Canada	
Win	27–17–2 (1)	Levi Avera	Submission (armbar)	ICS: Cage Rage	October 13, 2007	1	4:55	Oklahoma, United States	
Win	26–17–2 (1)	Cedric Marks	Decision (majority)	CCCF: Riverwind Rumble 2	July 28, 2007	5	3:00	Oklahoma, United States	
Loss	25–17–2 (1)	Dereck Keasley	Decision (unanimous)	KOTC: Damage Control	May 26, 2007	2	5:00	Chicago, Illinois, United States	
Loss	25–16–2 (1)	John Alessio	Submission (rear naked choke)	WEC 25: Las Vegas	January 20, 2007	1	4:50	Nevada, United States	
Loss	25–15–2 (1)	Donnie Liles	Submission (rear naked choke)	XFO 13: Operation Beatdown	November 11, 2006	1	3:58	Hoffman Estates, Illinois, United States	
Win	25–14–2 (1)	Sam Jackson	Submission (strikes)	XFO 12: Outdoor War	August 19, 2006	1	3:54	Illinois, United States	
Win	24–14–2 (1)	Jamie Toney	Decision (unanimous)	EC 68: Extreme Challenge 68	July 15, 2006	3	5:00	Hayward, Wisconsin, United States	
Loss	23–14–2 (1)	Joey Clark	Decision (unanimous)	KOTC: Redemption on the River	February 17, 2006	3	5:00	Illinois, United States	Middleweight bout.
Loss	23–13–2 (1)	Diego Sanchez	TKO (submission to punches)	UFC 54: Boiling Point	August 20, 2005	2	1:56	Nevada, United States	
Win	23–12–2 (1)	Gia Chirragishvili	Submission (rear-naked choke)	Shido: MMA	May 15, 2005	1	3:10	Georgia, United States	
Win	22–12–2 (1)	Trevor Garrett	Submission (rear-naked choke)	SB 40: SuperBrawl 40	April 30, 2005	1	2:36	Indiana, United States	
NC	21–12–2 (1)	Ross Ebañez	No Contest (accidental headbutt)	WEC 14: Vengeance	March 17, 2005	1	5:00	California, United States	
Loss	21–12–2	Nick Thompson	Decision	Combat: Do Fighting Challenge 2	February 5, 2005	N/A		Illinois, United States	
Win	21–11–2	Paul Jenkins	Decision	CW: Cage Wars	May 30, 2004	N/A		Ireland	
Draw	20–11–2	Gideon Ray	Draw	Shooto: Midwest Fighting	May 21, 2003	3	5:00	Indiana, United States	
Win	20–11–1	Stephane Jamet	N/A	Shido: Fists of Fury 2	April 12, 2003	N/A		Germany	
Loss	19–11–1	Tetsuji Kato	Decision (unanimous)	Shooto: 3/18 in Korakuen Hall	March 18, 2003	3	5:00	Tokyo, Japan	Return to Welterweight.
Win	19–10–1	Jason Rigsby	Decision (unanimous decision)	IC 5: Tribulation	October 26, 2002	3	5:00	Indiana, United States	Middleweight bout.
Loss	18–10–1	Yuki Kondo	Submission (toe hold)	Pancrase: Proof 2	March 31, 2001	1	1:45	Osaka, Japan	
Loss	18–9–1	Ikuhisa Minowa	Submission (toe hold)	Pancrase: 2000 Anniversary Show	September 24, 2000	1	5:00	Yokohama, Japan	
Win	18–8–1	John Chrisostomo	Decision (unanimous)	Pancrase - Trans 5	July 23, 2000	1	10:00	Tokyo, Japan	
Win	17–8–1	Yuji Hisamatsu	Decision (majority)	Pancrase: Trans 5	July 23, 2000	2	3:00	Tokyo, Japan	
Loss	16–8–1	Adrian Serrano	Decision (unanimous)	EC 31: Extreme Challenge 31	March 24, 2000	3	5:00	Wisconsin, United States	
Win	16–7–1	Henry Matamoros	TKO	TC: Total Combat 1	February 19, 2000	N/A		Illinois, United States	
Win	15–7–1	Dan Griffen	Submission	TC: Total Combat 1	February 19, 2000	N/A		Illinois, United States	
Win	14–7–1	Dennis Reed	Submission (armbar)	EC 26: Extreme Challenge 26	July 21, 1999	1	3:30	Illinois, United States	
Draw	13–7–1	Kevin Cook	Draw	WEF 6: World Extreme Fighting 6	June 12, 1999	N/A		Florida, United States	
Win	13–7	John Chrisostomo	TKO (cut)	SB 12: SuperBrawl 12	June 1, 1999	2	0:32	Hawaii, United States	
Win	12–7	Adam Palmer	TKO	EB 4: Extreme Boxing 4	April 27, 1999	1	5:51	Iowa, United States	Light Heavyweight debut.
Win	11–7	Joe Slick	Decision	EB 4: Extreme Boxing 4	April 27, 1999	1	15:00	Iowa, United States	
Win	10–7	Mark Hughes	Decision (split)	JKD: Challenge 3	April 24, 1999	3	5:00	Chicago, Illinois, United States	
Win	9–7	Martin Wickline	Submission	WPC: Rage in the Cage	April 3, 1999	N/A		Indiana, United States	
Win	8–7	Joshua Taibl	Submission (rear-naked choke)	CC 3: Cage Combat 3	July 15, 1998	1	2:18	Ohio, United States	
Win	7–7	John Renken	TKO	CC 3: Cage Combat 3	July 15, 1998	1	7:38	Ohio, United States	
Win	6–7	Travis Fulton	Decision	CC 3: Cage Combat 3	July 15, 1998	1	15:00	Ohio, United States	
Win	5–7	Jeremy Morrison	Submission (armbar)	JKD: Challenge 1	April 25, 1998	1	3:50	Illinois, United States	
Win	4–7	Jason Nicholsen	Submission (armbar)	WPC: World Pankration Championships 2	January 16, 1998	1		Texas, United States	
Loss	3–7	Vernon White	Submission (ankle lock)	WPC: World Pankration Championships 1	October 26, 1997	1	1:26	Texas, United States	
Loss	3–6	Egidio da Costa	Submission (headlock)	International Vale Tudo Championship 2: A Question of Pride	September 15, 1997	1	2:54	Brazil	
Loss	3–5	Osami Shibuya	Submission	Pancrase: Alive 7	June 30, 1997	1	8:47	Japan	
Loss	3–4	Keiichiro Yamamiya	Decision (lost points)	Pancrase: Alive 1	January 17, 1997	1	10:00	Tokyo, Japan	Return to Heavyweight.
Loss	3–3	Jay R. Palmer	TKO (submission to punches)	SB 2: SuperBrawl 2	October 11, 1996	1	4:05	Hawaii, United States	Lightweight debut.
Loss	3–2	Mike Sciortino	N/A	IFC 3: International Fighting Championship 3	September 14, 1996	N/A		Alabama, United States	
Win	3–1	Loren Phillips	N/A	IFC 3: International Fighting Championship 3	September 14, 1996	N/A		Alabama, United States	Middleweight debut.
Loss	2–1	Anthony Macias	Submission (kneebar)	IFC 2: Mayhem in Mississippi	August 23, 1996	1	1:28	Mississippi, United States	
Win	2–0	William Knorr	Submission (rear-naked choke)	IFC 2: Mayhem in Mississippi	August 23, 1996	1	1:12	Mississippi, United States	
Win	1–0	Michael Pacholik	Submission (rear-naked choke)	IFC 2: Mayhem in Mississippi	August 23, 1996	1	1:38	Mississippi, United States	
