= World Victory Road Presents: Sengoku 8 =

Mixed martial arts event

- Promotion: World Victory Road
- Date: May 2, 2009
- Venue: Yoyogi National Gymnasium
- City: Tokyo, Japan
- Attendance: 8,745

Event chronology
World Victory Road Presents: Sengoku 7	World Victory Road Presents: Sengoku 8	World Victory Road Presents: Sengoku 9

World Victory Road Presents: Sengoku 8 was a mixed martial arts event promoted by World Victory Road. It took place on May 2, 2009 and featured the second round of WVR's 2009 Featherweight Grand-Prix.

== Results ==
Main Card
Weight class				Method	Round	Time	Notes
Featherweight	Hatsu Hioki	def.	Ronnie Mann	Submission (Triangle Choke)	1	3:09
Featherweight	Michihiro Omigawa	def.	Nam Phan	TKO (Punches)	1	4:52
Lightweight	Kazunori Yokota	def.	Leonardo Santos	Decision (Split)	3	5:00
Light heavyweight	Alexandre Ribeiro	def.	Keiichiro Yamamiya	KO (Punch)	3	0:51
Featherweight	Masanori Kanehara	def.	Chan Sung Jung	Decision (Unanimous)	3	5:00
Featherweight	Marlon Sandro	def.	Nick Denis	KO (Punches)	1	0:19
Welterweight	Makoto Takimoto	def.	Michael Costa	Submission (Heel Hook)	1	3:31
Light Heavyweight	Stanislav Nedkov	def.	Travis Wiuff	TKO (Punches)	3	0:42
Welterweight	Akihiko Mori	def.	Maximo Blanco	DQ (Illegal Soccer Kick)	1	4:20
Bantamweight	Shigeki Osawa	def.	Kota Ishibashi	Decision (Unanimous)	2	5:00
Lightweight	Hirotoshi Saito	def.	Yoshitaka Abe	Submission (Armbar)	1	2:52

== See also ==
- World Victory Road
- List of Sengoku champions
- 2009 in World Victory Road
