= Keiichiro Yamamiya =

Japanese mixed martial arts fighter

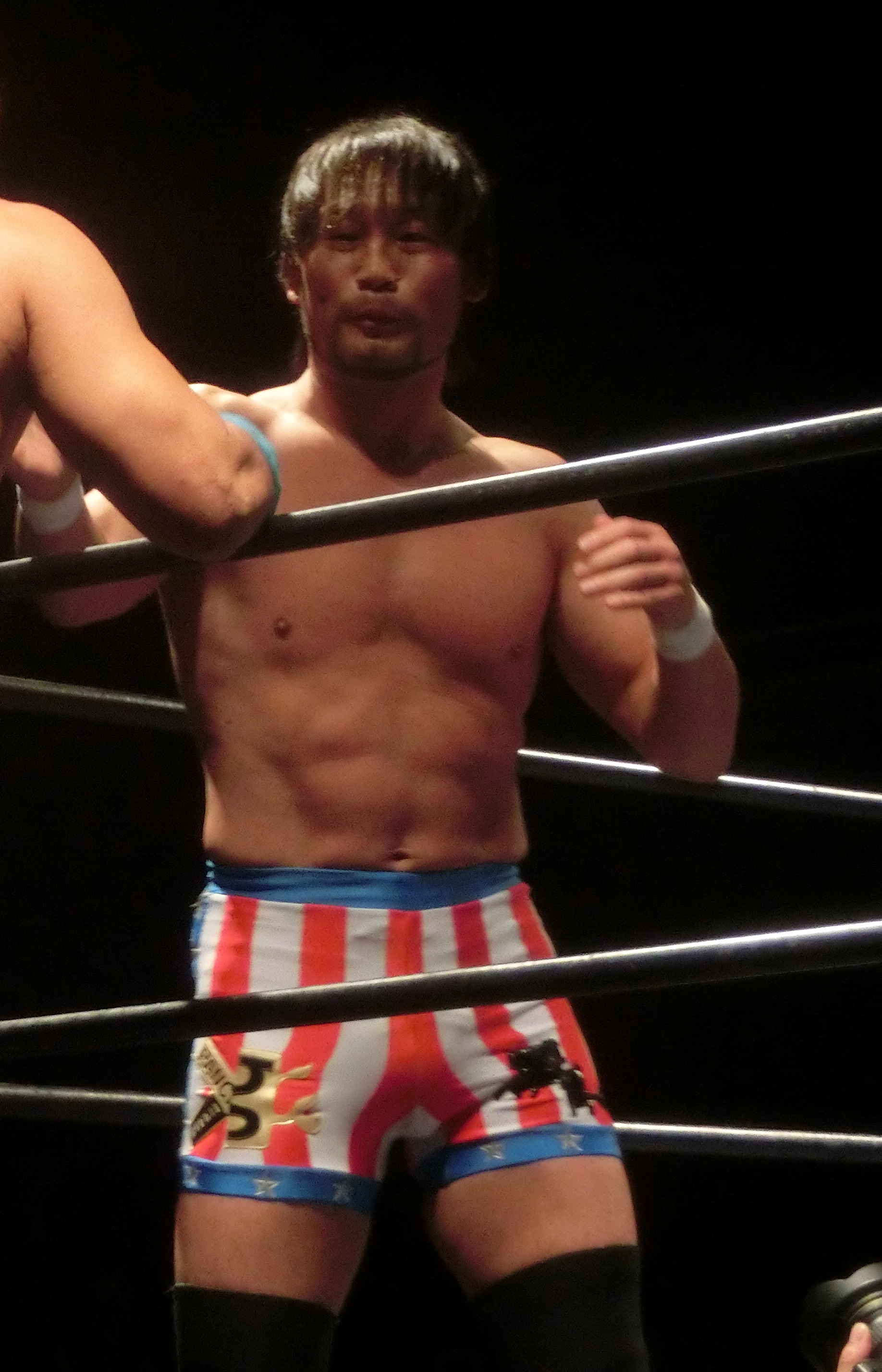
- Born: July 12, 1972 (age 54); Kanagawa, Japan
- Other names: Kei
- Nationality: Japanese
- Height: 5 ft 11 in (1.80 m)
- Weight: 185 lb (84 kg; 13.2 st)
- Division: Light Heavyweight; Middleweight; Welterweight
- Style: Wrestling, Kickboxing
- Fighting out of: Chigasaki, Kanagawa, Japan
- Team: Grabaka
- Years active: 1996-2015

Mixed martial arts record
- Total: 90
- Wins: 45
- By knockout: 11
- By submission: 3
- By decision: 31
- Losses: 35
- By knockout: 9
- By submission: 8
- By decision: 18
- Draws: 10

Other information
- Mixed martial arts record from Sherdog

Keiichiro Yamamiya (born July 12, 1972) is a Japanese former professional mixed martial artist. A veteran of 90 fights who began his career in 1996 and last competed in 2015, he fought in the UFC, Pancrase, DEEP, and World Victory Road. He was the inaugural King of Pancrase Light Heavyweight Champion.

== Mixed martial arts career ==
=== Ultimate Fighting Championship ===
Yamamiya signed with the UFC in 1999. He made his debut against Eugene Jackson at UFC 23 on November 19, 1999, and lost via first-round knockout. Yamamiya was then granted his release to return to Pancrase.

=== Pancrase ===
Yamamiya's history with Pancrase goes back his professional debut in 1996, when he faced Satoshi Hasegawa at the 1996 Pancrase Neo-Blood Tournament. He won his debut by split decision. He then lost in the quarter-finals of the tournament, falling to now-MMA legend Yuki Kondo by TKO.

He faced Ryo Kawamura to become the Light Heavyweight King Of Pancrase at Pancrase: Shining 8 on October 1, 2008. He lost via unanimous decision.

On June 5, 2010, Yamamiya challenged Kengo Ura to become the Welterweight King Of Pancrase at Pancrase: Passion Tour 5. He lost the fight via split decision. Yamamiya faced Yuji Hisamatsu at Pancrase 250 on July 28, 2013. Though Yamamiya was the heavy favorite on multiple media scoring websites, Hisamatsu won a majority decision.

=== DEEP ===
Yamamiya made his DEEP debut on January 8, 2001, when he faced Paulo Filho at DEEP: 1st Impact. He lost via second-round TKO. He faced Yuki Okano at DEEP: 65 Impact on March 22, 2014. Yamamiya was quickly taken down and submitted with a rear naked choke in the first round. Yamamiya faced UFC veteran Keita Nakamura at DEEP: 67 Impact on June 22, 2014. He lost the fight via TKO (punches) in the first round, putting Yamamiya at four losses in a row.

=== Sengoku ===
Though not currently active for the promotion, Yamamiya signed a contract with Sengoku and made his debut against Alexandre Ribeiro at Sengoku 8 on May 2, 2009. He lost via third-round knockout.

== Championships and accomplishments ==
- Pancrase Hybrid Wrestling
  - Pancrase Light Heavyweight Championship (One time, inaugural champion)
  - 2013 Pancrase Neo Blood Tournament Finalist
  - 2004 Pancrase Neo Blood Tournament Finalist
  - 2000 Pancrase Light Heavyweight Championship Tournament Winner
  - 1997 Pancrase Neo Blood Tournament Winner
  - 1996 Pancrase Neo Blood Tournament Semi-Finalist
- Ultimate Fighting Championship
  - UFC Encyclopedia Awards
    - Fight of the Night (One time) vs. Eugene Jackson

== Mixed martial arts record ==
Professional record breakdown
90 matches	45 wins	35 losses
By knockout	11	9
By submission	3	8
By decision	31	18
Draws	10	

Res.	Record	Opponent	Method	Event	Date	Round	Time	Location	Notes
Loss	45–35–10	Ikkei Nagamura	Decision (unanimous)	Pancrase: 264	February 1, 2015	3	5:00	Tokyo, Japan	Middleweight bout.
Loss	45–34–10	Kenta Takagi	KO (punch)	Pancrase: 261	October 5, 2014	2	0:37	Tokyo, Japan	
Loss	45–33–10	Keita Nakamura	TKO (punches)	DEEP: 67 Impact	June 22, 2014	1	4:13	Tokyo, Japan	
Loss	45–32–10	Yuki Okano	Submission (rear naked choke)	DEEP: 65 Impact	March 22, 2014	1	4:53	Tokyo, Japan	Return to Welterweight.
Loss	45–31–10	Eiji Ishikawa	Decision (unanimous)	Grabaka: Grabaka Live! 3	October 27, 2013	2	5:00	Tokyo, Japan	Open-weight bout.
Loss	45–30–10	Yuji Hisamatsu	Decision (majority)	Pancrase 250: 2013 Neo-Blood Tournament Finals	July 28, 2013	2	5:00	Tokyo, Japan	
Win	45–29–10	Daijiro Matsui	Decision (points)	U-Spirits: U-Spirits Again	March 9, 2013	1	15:00	Tokyo, Japan	
Loss	44–29–10	Will Noland	Decision (unanimous)	Pancrase 245	February 3, 2013	3	5:00	Tokyo, Japan	
Win	44–28–10	Ikkei Nagamura	KO (flying knee)	Pancrase: Progress Tour 14	December 1, 2012	1	1:26	Tokyo, Japan	Return to Middleweight.
Win	43–28–10	Kenichi Yamamoto	Decision (unanimous)	Grabaka: Grabaka Live! 2	October 27, 2012	2	5:00	Tokyo, Japan	
Loss	42–28–10	Takenori Sato	Decision (unanimous)	Pancrase: Progress Tour 10	September 1, 2012	3	5:00	Tokyo, Japan	For the Pancrase Welterweight Championship.
Win	42–27–10	Yukinari Tamura	Decision (majority)	Pancrase: Progress Tour 1	January 28, 2012	2	5:00	Tokyo, Japan	
Win	41–27–10	Shingo Suzuki	KO (punches)	Pancrase: Impressive Tour 13	December 3, 2011	1	4:24	Tokyo, Japan	
Win	40–27–10	Yoshihisa Yamamoto	Decision (unanimous)	Grabaka Live: 1st Cage Attack	October 15, 2011	2	5:00	Tokyo, Japan	
Win	39–27–10	Ichiro Kanai	Decision (majority)	Pancrase: Impressive Tour 8	August 7, 2011	2	5:00	Tokyo, Japan	
Draw	38–27–10	Kosei Kubota	Draw	Pancrase: Impressive Tour 1	February 6, 2011	2	5:00	Tokyo, Japan	
Loss	38–27–9	Masahiro Toryu	KO (head kick)	Pancrase: Passion Tour 11	December 5, 2010	1	4:51	Tokyo, Japan	
Win	38–26–9	Hoon Kim	Decision (majority)	Pancrase: Passion Tour 7	August 8, 2010	2	5:00	Tokyo, Japan	
Loss	37–26–9	Kengo Ura	Decision (split)	Pancrase: Passion Tour 5	June 5, 2010	3	5:00	Tokyo, Japan	Welterweight debut. For the vacant Pancrase Welterweight Championship.
Win	37–25–9	Takenori Sato	Decision (majority)	Pancrase: Passion Tour 3	April 4, 2010	2	5:00	Tokyo, Japan	
Loss	36–25–9	Yuji Hisamatsu	Decision (majority)	Pancrase: Passion Tour 1	February 7, 2010	3	5:00	Tokyo, Japan	
Win	36–24–9	Ryuji Ohori	KO (punch)	Pancrase: Changing Tour 3	June 7, 2009	1	1:01	Tokyo, Japan	
Loss	35–24–9	Alexandre Ribeiro	KO (punch)	World Victory Road Presents: Sengoku 8	May 2, 2009	3	0:51	Tokyo, Japan	
Loss	35–23–9	Ryo Kawamura	Decision (unanimous)	Pancrase: Shining 8	October 1, 2008	3	5:00	Tokyo, Japan	Return to Light Heavyweight. For the Pancrase Light Heavyweight Championship.
Win	35–22–9	Hiromitsu Kanehara	Decision (unanimous)	Pancrase: Shining 5	June 1, 2008	3	5:00	Tokyo, Japan	Middleweight debut.
Win	34–22–9	Yuki Kondo	Decision (majority)	Pancrase: Shining 3	April 27, 2008	3	5:00	Tokyo, Japan	
Win	33–22–9	Ryo Kawamura	Decision (unanimous)	Pancrase: Rising 10	December 22, 2007	3	5:00	Tokyo, Japan	
Draw	32–22–9	Carlos Toyota	Draw	MARS 6: Rapid Fire	December 22, 2006	2	5:00	Yokohama, Japan	
Loss	32–22–8	Mikko Rupponen	Decision (unanimous)	FF 17: Fight Festival 17	March 25, 2006	3	5:00	Helsinki, Finland	
Loss	32–21–8	Dae Won Kim	Decision (unanimous)	DEEP: 20th Impact	September 3, 2005	2	5:00	Tokyo, Japan	
Loss	32–20–8	Nilson de Castro	Decision (unanimous)	Pancrase: Spiral 2	March 6, 2005	3	5:00	Yokohama, Japan	
Loss	32–19–8	Gustavo Machado	Submission (heel hook)	Pancrase: Brave 11	November 26, 2004	3	1:20	Tokyo, Japan	
Win	32–18–8	Chael Sonnen	Decision (majority)	Pancrase: 2004 Neo-Blood Tournament Final	July 25, 2004	3	5:00	Tokyo, Japan	
Win	31–18–8	Kozo Urita	Decision (unanimous)	Pancrase: Brave 5	May 28, 2004	2	5:00	Tokyo, Japan	
Draw	30–18–8	Bret Bergmark	Draw	Pancrase: Hybrid 11	December 21, 2003	3	5:00	Tokyo, Japan	
Draw	30–18–7	Keith Jardine	Draw	Pancrase: Hybrid 8	October 4, 2003	2	5:00	Osaka, Japan	
Win	30–18–6	Nate Marquardt	Decision (unanimous)	Pancrase: 2003 Neo-Blood Tournament Second Round	July 27, 2003	3	5:00	Tokyo, Japan	
Loss	29–18–6	Nilson de Castro	TKO (punches)	Pancrase: Hybrid 6	June 7, 2003	1	4:00	Tokyo, Japan	
Draw	29–17–6	Tsuyoshi Kurihara	Draw	Pancrase: Hybrid 4	April 12, 2003	2	5:00	Tokyo, Japan	
Loss	29–17–5	Akihiro Gono	TKO (punches)	Pancrase: Spirit 9	December 21, 2002	3	3:49	Tokyo, Japan	
Win	29–16–5	Eiji Ishikawa	Decision (majority)	Pancrase: 2002 Anniversary Show	September 29, 2002	3	5:00	Yokohama, Japan	
Win	28–16–5	Mitsuyoshi Sato	TKO (punches)	Pancrase: 2002 Neo-Blood Tournament Second Round	July 28, 2002	3	2:52	Tokyo, Japan	
Win	27–16–5	Ichiro Kanai	TKO (punches)	Pancrase: Spirit 4	May 11, 2002	1	3:51	Osaka, Japan	
Win	26–16–5	Sumio Koyano	KO (punches)	Pancrase: Spirit 3	March 25, 2002	1	0:31	Tokyo, Japan	
Loss	25–16–5	Yuki Sasaki	Submission (armbar)	Pancrase: Spirit 1	January 27, 2002	1	4:29	Tokyo, Japan	
Loss	25–15–5	Akihiro Gono	Decision (unanimous)	Pancrase: Proof 6	October 30, 2001	3	5:00	Tokyo, Japan	
Win	25–14–5	Hikaru Sato	Decision (unanimous)	Zero1: Shingeki Chapter 2	August 30, 2001	2	5:00	Tokyo, Japan	
Win	24–14–5	Yoshinori Kawasaki	TKO (punches)	Pancrase: 2001 Neo-Blood Tournament Second Round	July 29, 2001	1	4:04	Tokyo, Japan	
Loss	23–14–5	Paulo Filho	KO (punches)	DEEP: 1st Impact	January 8, 2001	2	0:29	Nagoya, Japan	
Win	23–13–5	Denis Kang	Decision (majority)	Pancrase: Trans 7	December 4, 2000	2	3:00	Tokyo, Japan	
Win	22–13–5	Ikuhisa Minowa	Decision (unanimous)	Pancrase: 2000 Anniversary Show	September 24, 2000	2	3:00	Yokohama, Japan	Won the 2000 Pancrase Light Heavyweight Championship Tournament and the inaugural Pancrase Light Heavyweight Championship.
Win	21–13–5	Omar Bouiche	Submission (guillotine choke)	Pancrase: 2000 Anniversary Show	September 24, 2000	1	6:46	Yokohama, Japan	2000 Pancrase Light Heavyweight Championship Tournament Semifinals.
Win	20–13–5	Naohisa Kawamura	Decision (unanimous)	Pancrase: Trans 4	June 26, 2000	1	10:00	Tokyo, Japan	2000 Pancrase Light Heavyweight Championship Tournament Quarterfinals.
Win	19–13–5	Kousei Kubota	Decision (majority)	Pancrase: Trans 4	June 26, 2000	1	10:00	Tokyo, Japan	2000 Pancrase Light Heavyweight Championship Tournament Opening Round.
Win	18–13–5	Chris Lytle	Decision (unanimous)	Pancrase: Trans 1	January 23, 2000	1	10:00	Tokyo, Japan	
Loss	17–13–5	Eugene Jackson	KO (punch)	UFC 23	November 19, 1999	3	3:12	Tokyo, Japan	Light Heavyweight debut.
Win	17–12–5	Leon Dijk	TKO	Pancrase: Breakthrough 7	July 6, 1999	1	2:05	Tokyo, Japan	
Loss	16–12–5	Kiuma Kunioku	Decision (lost points)	Pancrase: Breakthrough 5	May 23, 1999	1	15:00	Nagoya, Japan	
Win	16–11–5	Yuhi Sano	TKO (strikes)	Pancrase: Breakthrough 3	March 9, 1999	1	10:43	Tokyo, Japan	
Draw	15–11–5	Jeremy Horn	Draw	Pancrase: Advance 12	December 19, 1998	1	15:00	Tokyo, Japan	
Win	15–11–4	Jason DeLucia	Decision (lost points)	Pancrase: Advance 10	October 26, 1998	1	15:00	Tokyo, Japan	
Win	14–11–4	Satoshi Hasegawa	Decision (majority)	Pancrase: 1998 Neo-Blood Tournament Second Round	July 26, 1998	1	15:00	Aomori, Japan	
Loss	13–11–4	Osami Shibuya	Decision (unanimous)	Pancrase: 1998 Neo-Blood Tournament Opening Round	July 7, 1998	1	20:00	Tokyo, Japan	
Draw	13–10–4	Ryushi Yanagisawa	Draw	Pancrase: Advance 8	June 21, 1998	2	3:00	Kobe, Japan	
Win	13–10–3	Takafumi Ito	TKO	Pancrase: Advance 6	May 12, 1998	2	1:35	Tokyo, Japan	
Loss	12–10–3	Yuki Kondo	Decision (majority)	Pancrase: Advance 5	April 26, 1998	1	20:00	Yokohama, Japan	
Win	12–9–3	Minoru Suzuki	Decision (majority)	Pancrase: Advance 3	March 1, 1998	1	20:00	Kobe, Japan	
Draw	11–9–3	Ryushi Yanagisawa	Draw	Pancrase: Advance 2	February 6, 1998	1	10:00	Yokohama, Japan	
Loss	11–9–2	Osami Shibuya	Submission (toe hold)	Pancrase: Advance 1	January 16, 1998	1	17:31	Tokyo, Japan	
Loss	11–8–2	Bas Rutten	Submission (rear naked choke)	Pancrase: Alive 11	December 20, 1997	1	4:58	Yokohama, Japan	
Win	11–7–2	Takafumi Ito	Decision (unanimous)	Pancrase: Alive 10	November 16, 1997	2	3:00	Kobe, Japan	
Draw	10–7–2	Tra Telligman	Draw	Pancrase: Alive 9	October 29, 1997	2	3:00	Tokyo, Japan	
Win	10–7–1	Minoru Suzuki	Decision (lost points)	Pancrase: 1997 Anniversary Show	September 6, 1997	1	20:00	Tokyo, Japan	
Win	9–7–1	Osami Shibuya	Decision (1-0)	Pancrase: Alive 8	August 9, 1997	2	3:00	Osaka, Japan	
Win	8–7–1	Satoshi Hasegawa	TKO (knees)	Pancrase: 1997 Neo-Blood Tournament, Round 2	July 21, 1997	1	5:50	Tokyo, Japan	Won the 1997 Neo Blood Tournament.
Win	7–7–1	Kousei Kubota	Decision (lost points)	Pancrase: 1997 Neo-Blood Tournament, Round 2	July 21, 1997	1	10:00	Tokyo, Japan	1997 Neo Blood Tournament Semifinal.
Win	6–7–1	Les Johnston	Submission (guillotine choke)	Pancrase: 1997 Neo-Blood Tournament, Round 1	July 20, 1997	1	4:07	Tokyo, Japan	1997 Neo Blood Tournament First Round.
Loss	5–7–1	Guy Mezger	Decision (lost points)	Pancrase: Alive 7	June 30, 1997	1	15:00	Hakata, Fukuoka, Japan	
Draw	5–6–1	Kiuma Kunioku	Draw	Pancrase: Alive 5	May 24, 1997	1	10:00	Kobe, Japan	
Win	5–6	Taka Michinoku	Submission (keylock)	Pancrase: Alive 4	April 27, 1997	1	7:36	Tokyo, Japan	
Loss	4–6	Ryushi Yanagisawa	Decision (lost points)	Pancrase: Alive 3	March 22, 1997	1	10:00	Nagoya, Japan	
Win	4–5	Takafumi Ito	Decision (lost points)	Pancrase: Alive 2	February 22, 1997	1	15:00	Tokyo, Japan	
Win	3–5	Brian Gassaway	Decision (lost points)	Pancrase: Alive 1	January 17, 1997	1	10:00	Tokyo, Japan	
Win	2–5	Wes Gassaway	Decision (unanimous)	Pancrase: Truth 10	December 15, 1996	1	10:00	Tokyo, Japan	
Loss	1–5	Yoshiki Takahashi	Submission	Pancrase: Truth 9	November 9, 1996	1	7:12	Kobe, Japan	
Loss	1–4	Kiuma Kunioku	Submission	Pancrase: Truth 8	October 22, 1996	1	1:38	Tokyo, Japan	
Loss	1–3	Katsuomi Inagaki	Decision (majority)	Pancrase: 1996 Anniversary Show	September 7, 1996	1	10:00	Tokyo, Japan	
Loss	1–2	Osami Shibuya	Submission	Pancrase: 1996 Anniversary Show	September 7, 1996	1	6:48	Tokyo, Japan	
Loss	1–1	Yuki Kondo	TKO	Pancrase: 1996 Neo-Blood Tournament, Round 2	July 23, 1996	1	6:16	Tokyo, Japan	1996 Neo Blood Tournament Semifinals.
Win	1–0	Satoshi Hasegawa	Decision (split)	Pancrase: 1996 Neo-Blood Tournament, Round 1	July 22, 1996	1	10:00	Tokyo, Japan	1996 Neo Blood Tournament Opening Round.
