= Daiju Takase =

Japanese mixed martial arts fighter

- Born: April 20, 1978 (age 48); Tokyo, Japan
- Other names: "The Newaza Artist", "The Grappler King from the Shadows"
- Nationality: Japanese
- Height: 6 ft 0 in (1.83 m)
- Weight: 183 lb (83 kg; 13.1 st)
- Division: Welterweight; Middleweight
- Style: Boxing, Kickboxing
- Fighting out of: Tokyo, Japan
- Team: Wajyutsu Keishukai; Tiger's Den; ING
- Teacher: Yoshinori Nishi

Mixed martial arts record
- Total: 29
- Wins: 12
- By knockout: 1
- By submission: 5
- By decision: 6
- Losses: 15
- By knockout: 7
- By submission: 1
- By decision: 6
- By disqualification: 1
- Draws: 2

Other information
- Mixed martial arts record from Sherdog

Daiju Takase (高瀬 大樹, Takase Daiju; born April 20, 1978, in Tokyo) is a Japanese mixed martial artist and kickboxer. He has fought as a middleweight and welterweight in the Ultimate Fighting Championship and PRIDE Fighting Championship.

== Mixed martial arts career ==
=== PRIDE Fighting Championships ===
A representative of Yoshinori Nishi's Wajyutsu Keishukai MMA dojo, Takase made his debut in PRIDE Fighting Championship at its third event, facing amateur sumo champion Emmanuel Yarbrough. Outweighed by a total of 430-lbs, more than twice his own weight, Takase resolved to get his opponent tired by running around the ring, making him chase Takase, which gained him a yellow card. At the second round, Daiju tried a single leg takedown only for Yarbrough to land on top of him, but the Japanese managed to get his arms free and landed punches to the head for the TKO.

Takase didn't return to PRIDE until 2002, when he got a win and a loss against Brazilians Johil de Oliveira and Nino Schembri. However, his popularity came in PRIDE 26, when he fought Chute Boxe rising star Anderson Silva. At the time, Silva was on a 9-match winning streak, and given Takase's unimpressive record, he was a heavy underdog. However, Takase surprised spectators with a first-round triangle choke submission victory.

He next faced Rodrigo Gracie from the Gracie family at the first event of PRIDE Bushido, which featured a special Team Gracie vs Team Japan series of matches. Takase came to the fight wearing orange tights similar to "Gracie Hunter" Kazushi Sakuraba's, including his initials on the back. During the match, Gracie took down repeatedly Takase and landed hard ground and pound, but the Japanese was skilled enough to keep him from passing guard or knocking him out. The second round would see similar action, with Takase losing striking exchanges by punches and knees and avoiding submissions on the ground. After the action, Gracie was awarded with a unanimous decision.

At PRIDE Shockwave 2003, Takase fought former Shooto champion Hayato Sakurai. Daiju controlled a part of the first round, taking down Sakurai and bloodying his nose with punches. At this point, however, Sakurai started coming back, hijacking the standing segments with superior striking and negating Takase's submission attempts in order to do damage through his guard. The Shooto fighter ended the fight taking down Takase several times and controlling the action, which gained him a unanimous decision.

After defeating Chris Brennan by decision, Takase accomplished another of his biggest wins in his match on May 23, 2004, against grappling expert Carlos Newton. The first round of the bout saw multiple exchanges on the mat between the two contenders and increasingly complex submissions attempts by the Japanese, including an omoplata, a series of triangle chokes and even a cartwheel into a flying triangle choke while standing; however, Newton was able to defend all of them and land minor striking in every opportunity. The last half saw instead the two trading strikes, and it ended with Takase stopping Newton from passing his guard and trying a last triangle choke. After the battle, Takase was awarded the split decision.

Daiju's last apparition in PRIDE would be on April 3, 2005, losing to Daniel Acacio by TKO.

=== Ultimate Fighting Championship ===
Takase made his debut in Ultimate Fighting Championship on July 16, 1999 at UFC 21, where he was pitted against Jeremy Horn, who sported a large size advantage and a 31-4-4 record. The Japanese lost the fight by TKO after receiving a long punishment in ground and pound.

He returned at UFC 23, the second event of the promotion on Japanese ground. Takase took part in a four-man tournament which got him pitted against former RINGS fighter Kenichi Yamamoto in the semi-finals. Takase controlled portions of the fight through striking from the guard and defensive grappling, but he was ultimately defeated by unanimous decision.

Takase's final return to UFC would be in 2000 at UFC 29, fighting Brazilian jiu-jitsu exponent Fabiano Iha. The bout was short, with Iha knocking out Takase with punches in 2:24.

=== Other promotions ===
Takase most recently fought on July 25, 2015, when he got a decision loss to Yoon Dong-sik at ROAD FC 24.

== Mixed martial arts record ==
Professional record breakdown
29 matches	12 wins	15 losses
By knockout	1	7
By submission	5	1
By decision	6	6
By disqualification	0	1
Draws	2	

Res.	Record	Opponent	Method	Event	Date	Round	Time	Location	Notes
Loss	12–15–2	Dong-sik Yoon	Decision (split)	Road FC: Road Fighting Championship 24	July 25, 2015	3	5:00	Tokyo, Japan	
Loss	12–14–2	Carlos Toyota	KO (punches)	Real Fight Championship - Real 1	December 23, 2014	1	0:39	Tokyo, Japan	
Win	12–13–2	Seung-Bae Whi	TKO (punches)	Road FC: Road Fighting Championship 16	July 26, 2014	1	4:34	Gyeongsangbuk-do, South Korea	
Win	11–13–2	Yuji Sakuragi	Submission (guillotine choke)	Deep - Haleo Impact	December 22, 2012	2	1:33	Tokyo, Japan	
Win	10–13–2	Brandon Kesler	Decision (unanimous)	Dare Fight Sports - Dare 1/12	January 7, 2012	3	5:00	Bangkok, Thailand	
Draw	9–13–2	Hoon Kim	Draw (majority)	Pancrase: Passion Tour 4	April 29, 2010	2	5:00	Tokyo, Japan	
Win	9–13–1	Mr. X	Submission (armbar)	TFC - Titan Fighting Championship 5	August 23, 2009	1	2:17	Tokyo, Japan	
Win	8–13–1	Shuji Morikawa	Decision (split)	GCM - Cage Force 11	June 27, 2009	3	5:00	Tokyo, Japan	
Loss	7–13–1	Masataka Chinushi	KO (punch)	Heat - Heat 8	December 14, 2008	2	4:57	Tokyo, Japan	
Loss	7–12–1	Terry Martin	DQ (low blows)	Adrenaline MMA: Guida vs. Russow	June 14, 2008	2	3:35	Chicago, Illinois, United States	
Loss	7–11–1	Hector Lombard	KO (punch)	X - plosion 13	March 18, 2006	1	4:40	Australia	
Loss	7–10–1	Daniel Acácio	TKO (soccer kicks)	PRIDE Bushido 6	April 3, 2005	2	3:34	Yokohama, Japan	
Win	7–9–1	Carlos Newton	Decision (split)	PRIDE Bushido 3	May 23, 2004	2	5:00	Yokohama, Japan	
Win	6–9–1	Chris Brennan	Decision (unanimous)	PRIDE Bushido 2	February 15, 2004	2	5:00	Yokohama, Japan	
Loss	5–9–1	Hayato Sakurai	Decision (unanimous)	PRIDE Shockwave 2003	December 31, 2003	3	5:00	Saitama, Japan	
Loss	5–8–1	Rodrigo Gracie	Decision (unanimous)	PRIDE Bushido 1	October 5, 2003	2	5:00	Saitama, Japan	
Win	5–7–1	Anderson Silva	Submission (triangle choke)	PRIDE 26	June 8, 2003	1	8:33	Yokohama, Japan	
Loss	4–7–1	Antonio Schembri	Decision (split)	Pride The Best Vol.2	July 20, 2002	2	5:00	Tokyo, Japan	
Win	4–6–1	Johil de Oliveira	Decision (unanimous)	Pride The Best Vol.1	February 22, 2002	2	5:00	Tokyo, Japan	
Win	3–6–1	LaVerne Clark	Submission (triangle choke)	Pancrase - 2001 Neo-Blood Tournament Opening Round	July 29, 2001	2	0:16	Tokyo, Japan	
Loss	2–6–1	Kiuma Kunioku	Decision (majority)	Pancrase - Proof 2	March 31, 2001	3	5:00	Osaka, Japan	
Loss	2–5–1	Fabiano Iha	TKO (punches)	UFC 29	December 16, 2000	1	2:24	Tokyo, Japan	
Loss	2–4–1	Nate Marquardt	KO (knee)	Pancrase - Trans 4	June 26, 2000	2	1:30	Tokyo, Japan	
Win	2–3–1	Daisuke Watanabe	Decision (unanimous)	Pancrase - Trans 1	January 23, 2000	1	10:00	Tokyo, Japan	
Loss	1–3–1	Kenichi Yamamoto	Decision (unanimous)	UFC 23	November 19, 1999	3	5:00	Tokyo, Japan	
Loss	1–2–1	Ikuhisa Minowa	Submission (triangle choke)	Pancrase - 1999 Neo-Blood Tournament Opening Round	August 1, 1999	1	7:59	Tokyo, Japan	
Loss	1–1–1	Jeremy Horn	TKO (punches)	UFC 21	July 16, 1999	1	4:41	Cedar Rapids, Iowa, United States	
Draw	1–0–1	Daisuke Ishii	Draw	Pancrase - Breakthrough 4	April 18, 1999	1	15:00	Yokohama, Japan	
Win	1–0	Emmanuel Yarborough	TKO (submission to punches)	PRIDE 3	June 24, 1998	2	3:22	Tokyo, Japan	

== Kickboxing record ==
Kickboxing record
5 wins, 4 losses
Date	Result	Opponent	Event	Location	Method	Round	Time	Record
April 3, 2016	Loss	(Japan) Nangoku Chojin	Shootboxing - 2016 Act.2	Tokyo, Japan	Decision (unanimous)	3	5:00	5-4
November 15, 2015	Win	(Japan) Ryo Sakai	Big Bang - The Fighter 15	Tokyo, Japan	Decision (unanimous)	3	5:00	5-3
September 6, 2015	Loss	(Japan) Takeshige Hayashi	Big Bang - Consolidation Road 22	Tokyo, Japan	Decision (unanimous)	3	5:00	4-3
October 14, 2014	Win	(Japan) Mitsuyo Hosoi	Big Bang - The Fighter 12	Tokyo, Japan	Decision (unanimous)	3	5:00	4-2
December 1, 2013	Win	(Japan) Soichi Nishida	Big Bang - Consolidation Road 15	Tokyo, Japan	Decision (unanimous)	3	5:00	3-2
May 15, 2011	Win	(Japan) Takeshige Hayashi	Big Bang - Consolidation Road 5	Tokyo, Japan	Decision (unanimous)	3	5:00	2-2
December 11, 2009	Loss	(Japan) Naoki Samukawa	Fujiwara Festival 2009	Tokyo, Japan	Decision (unanimous)	3	5:00	1-2
November 25, 2007	Loss	(Japan) Koichi Takemura	RISE XLI	Tokyo, Japan	Decision (unanimous)	3	5:00	1-1
January 27, 2006	Win	(Japan) Ken Noisho	J-RED Mach Go-GO '06	Tokyo, Japan	Decision (unanimous)	3	5:00	1-0
Legend: Win Loss Draw/No contest

== Submission grappling record ==
Result	Opponent	Method	Event	Date	Round	Time	Notes
Win	(Japan) Tetsuo Kondo	Submission (rear–naked choke)	Wardog 08 × Gra-chan 21	2016	1	0:33	
Win	(Japan) Toru Harai	Submission (triangle armbar)	Club Fight	2008	1	1:37	
Win	(Federation of Rhodesia and Nyasaland) Karl Amoussou	Submission (triangle choke)	Budo Challenge -87 kg	2006	1	N/A	
Draw	(Japan) Sanae Kikuta and (Japan) Takeshi Yamazaki	Points	The Contenders X-Rage Vol.1	December 14, 2001	1	10:00	Partnered with (Japan) Minoru Suzuki
Draw	(Japan) Minoru Suzuki and (Japan) Takafumi Ito	Points	The Contenders 5 Prospective M-1	October 6, 2001	1	10:00	Partnered with (Japan) Caol Uno
Draw	(Japan) Mitsuyoshi Hayakawa	Points	The Contenders 4 Prospective	2000	2	5:00	
Loss	(United States) Vernon White	Points	ADCC 1999 –99 kg	1999	1	10:00	
Loss	(Japan) Nobuhiro Tsurumaki	Submission (toe hold)	The Contenders	1999	2	01:16	

== See also ==
- List of male mixed martial artists
