= Yokohama Cultural Gymnasium =

Indoor sports arena in Yokohama, Japan

Coordinates: 35°26′27.77″N 139°38′11.55″E

- Buntai
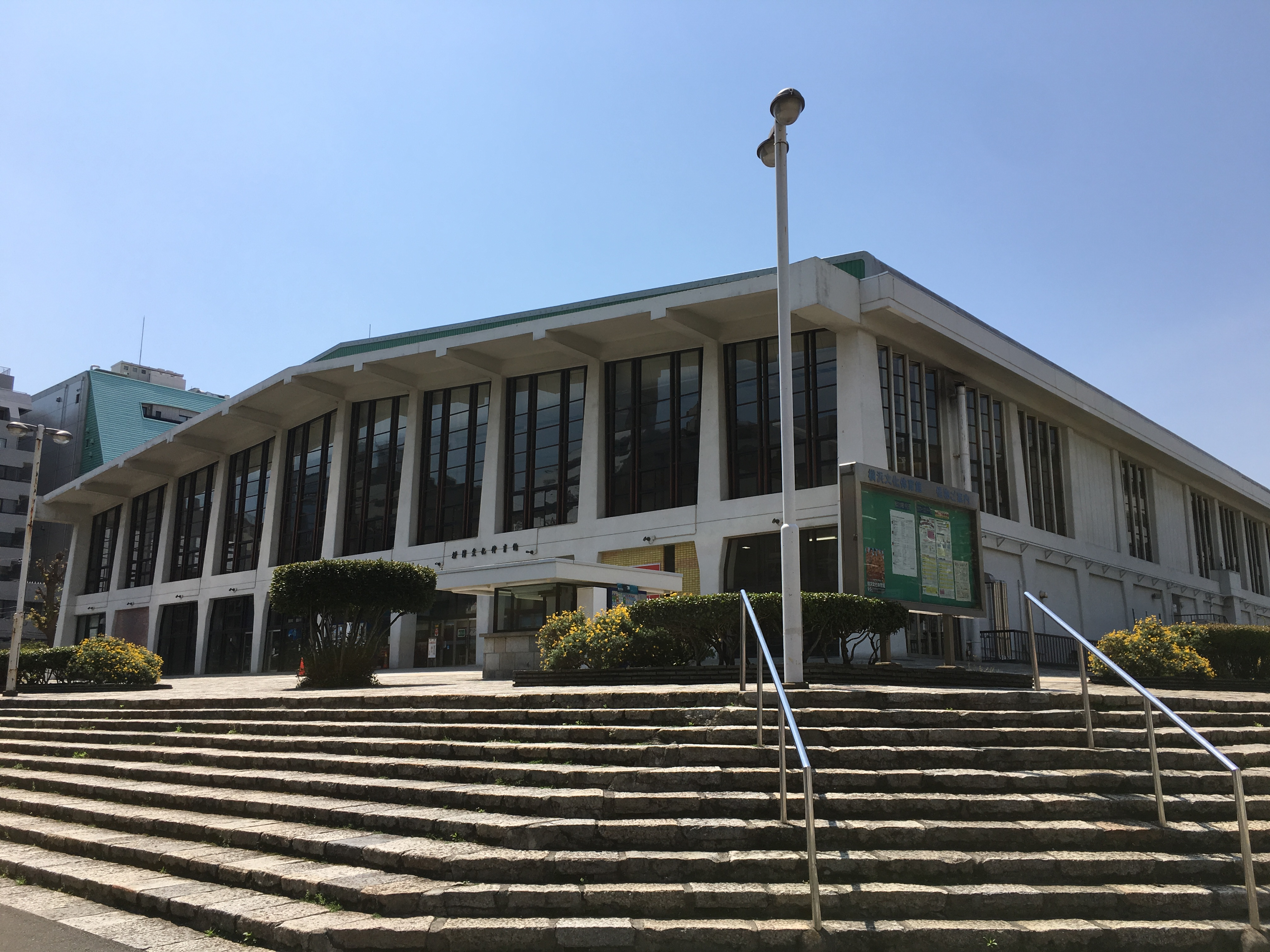

- Location within Kanagawa Prefecture Yokohama Cultural Gymnasium (Japan)
- Interactive map of Yokohama Cultural Gymnasium
- Address: Naka-ku, Yokohama, Kanagawa Prefecture, Japan
- Capacity: 5,000

Construction
- Opened: May 23, 1962
- Closed: September 6, 2020

Yokohama Cultural Gymnasium (Japanese: 横浜文化体育館, Hepburn: Yokohama Bunka Taiikukan), abbreviated to Yokohama Buntai (横浜文体), was an indoor sports arena located in Naka-ku, Yokohama, Japan. The capacity of the arena is 5,000 people and was opened in 1962.

It is a five-minute walk from the closest subway station, Kannai Station, on the JR/Yokohama Municipal Subway.

The arena hosted the volleyball events of the 1964 Summer Olympics.

The last major event held at the arena was an event held by Big Japan Pro Wrestling on August 30, 2020 which was called "Last Buntai". The arena closed its doors on September 6, 2020, and was replaced by a new building officially named Yokohama Buntai in April 2024.

== Facilities ==
- Main arena - 1,920m^{2}, 40m×48m×13m

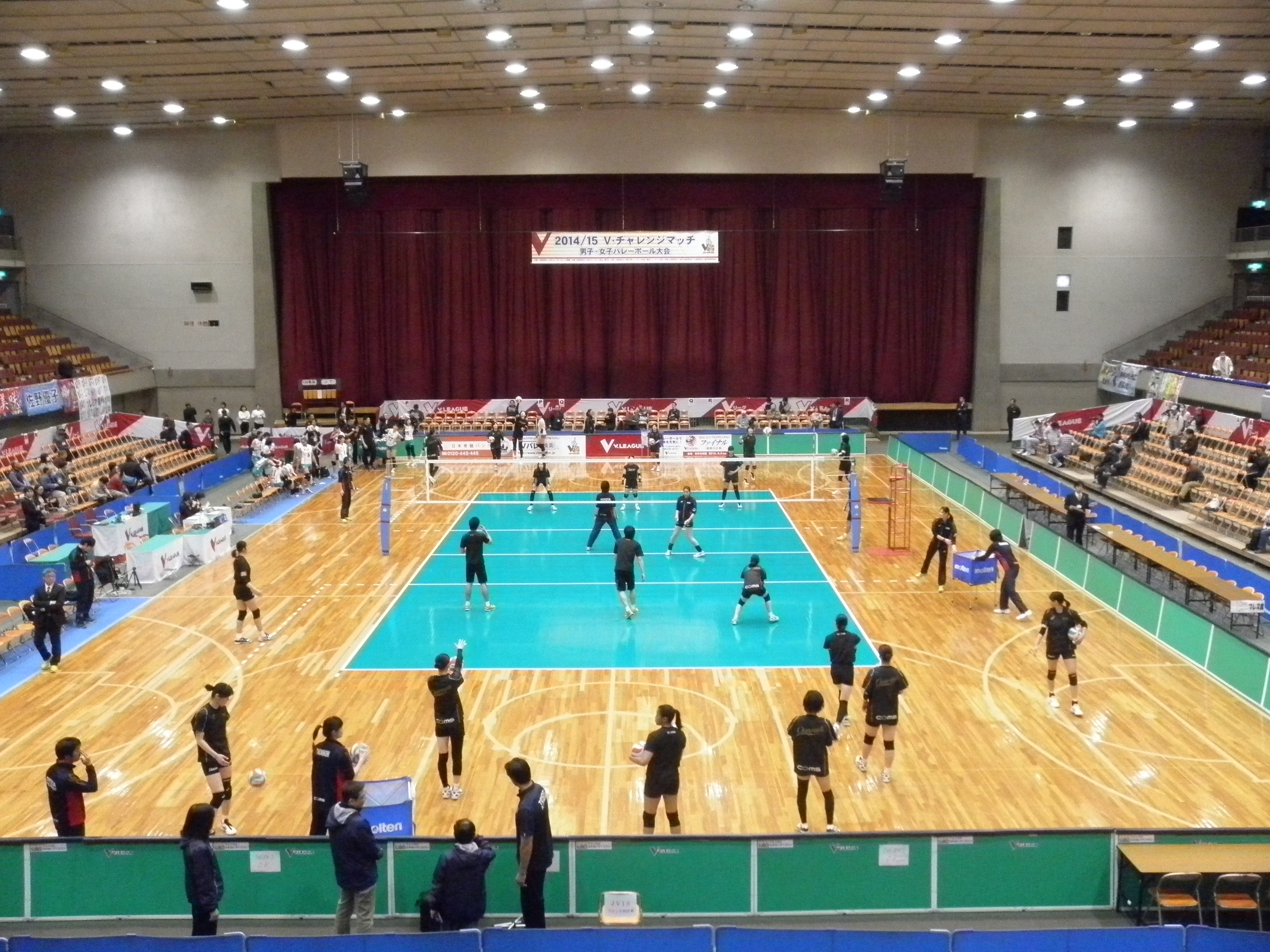
Arena

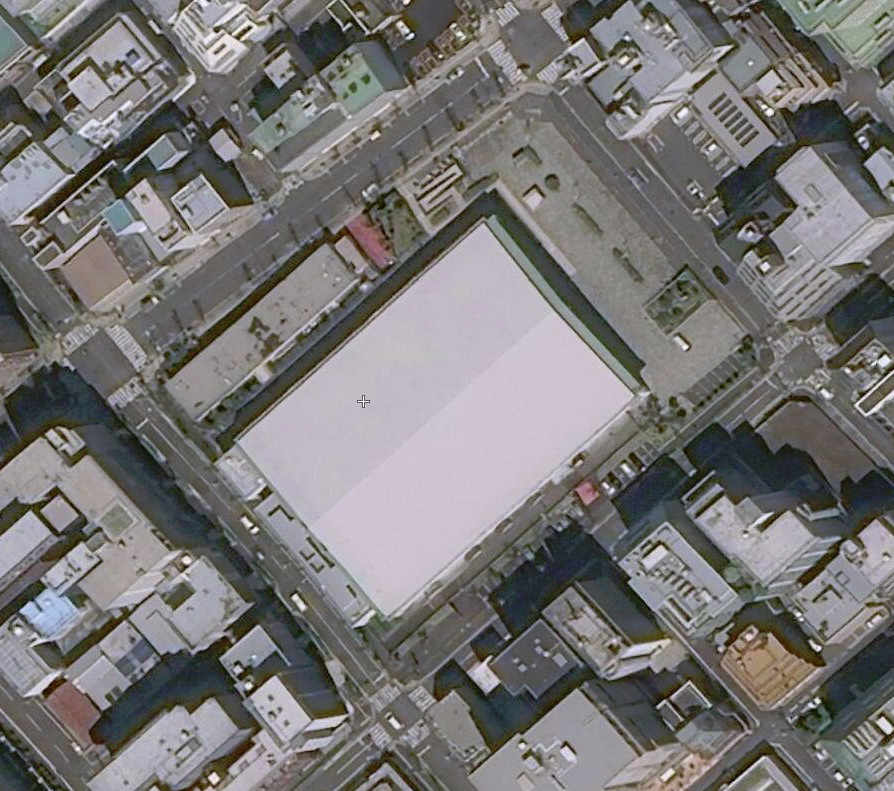
Satellite view, May 2019
