= 1993 in Pancrase =

Mixed martial arts events

Information
- First date: September 21, 1993
- Last date: December 8, 1993

Events
- Total events: 4

Fights
- Total fights: 21
- Title fights: N/A

Chronology
1993 in Pancrase	1994 in Pancrase

The year 1993 was the first year in the history of Pancrase, a mixed martial arts promotion based in the Japan. In 1993 Pancrase held 4 events beginning with, Pancrase: Yes, We Are Hybrid Wrestlers 1.

== Events list ==
#	Event Title	Date	Arena	Location
4	Pancrase: Yes, We Are Hybrid Wrestlers 4	December 8, 1993	Hakata Star Lanes	Hakata-ku, Fukuoka, Japan
3	Pancrase: Yes, We Are Hybrid Wrestlers 3	November 8, 1993	Kobe World Commemoration Hall	Kobe, Hyogo, Japan
2	Pancrase: Yes, We Are Hybrid Wrestlers 2	October 14, 1993	Tsuyuhashi Sports Center	Nagoya, Aichi, Japan
1	Pancrase: Yes, We Are Hybrid Wrestlers 1	September 21, 1993	Tokyo Bay NK Hall	Urayasu, Chiba, Japan

== Pancrase: Yes, We Are Hybrid Wrestlers 1 ==
Pancrase: Yes, We Are Hybrid Wrestlers 1 was an event held on September 21, 1993, at Tokyo Bay NK Hall in Nagoya, Urayasu, Chiba, Japan.

=== Results ===
Main Card
Weight class				Method	Round	Time	Notes
	Ken Shamrock	def.	Masakatsu Funaki	Submission (Rear-Naked Choke)	1	6:15
	Kazuo Takahashi	def.	George Weingeroff	KO (Palm Strikes)	1	1:23
	Takaku Fuke	def.	Vernon White	Submission (Armbar)	1	1:19
	Bas Rutten	def.	Ryushi Yanagisawa	KO (Palm Strike)	1	0:43
	Minoru Suzuki	def.	Katsuomi Inagaki	Submission (Rear-Naked Choke)	1	3:25

== Pancrase: Yes, We Are Hybrid Wrestlers 2 ==
Pancrase: Yes, We Are Hybrid Wrestlers 2 was an event held on October 14, 1993, at The Tsuyuhashi Sports Center in Nagoya, Aichi, Japan.

=== Results ===
Main Card
Weight class				Method	Round	Time	Notes
	Ken Shamrock	def.	Kazuo Takahashi	Submission (Heel Hook)	1	12:23
	Minoru Suzuki	def.	Vernon White	Submission (Leg Scissor Choke)	1	2:36
	Masakatsu Funaki	def.	Ryushi Yanagisawa	Submission (Kneebar)	1	1:35
	Bas Rutten	def.	Takaku Fuke	KO (Knee to the Body)	1	2:03
	Katsuomi Inagaki	def.	Joop van de Ven	KO (Palm Strikes)	1	4:48

== Pancrase: Yes, We Are Hybrid Wrestlers 3 ==
Pancrase: Yes, We Are Hybrid Wrestlers 3 was an event held on November 8, 1993, at Kobe World Commemoration Hall in Kobe, Hyogo, Japan.

=== Results ===
Main Card
Weight class				Method	Round	Time	Notes
	Masakatsu Funaki	def.	Cees Bezems	Submission (Keylock)	1	1:42
	Maurice Smith	def.	Minoru Suzuki	KO (Punch)	3	0:52
	Ken Shamrock	def.	Takaku Fuke	Submission (Rear-Naked Choke)	1	0:44
	Kazuo Takahashi	def.	James Mathews	Submission (Armbar)	1	1:11
	Ryushi Yanagisawa	def.	Andre Van Den Oetelaar	Submission (Heel Hook)	1	15:51
	Vernon White	def.	Katsuomi Inagaki	TKO (Doctor Stoppage)	1	22:04

== Pancrase: Yes, We Are Hybrid Wrestlers 4 ==
Pancrase: Yes, We Are Hybrid Wrestlers 4 was an event held on December 8, 1993, at Hakata Star Lanes in Hakata-ku, Fukuoka, Japan.

=== Results ===
Main Card
Weight class				Method	Round	Time	Notes
	Masakatsu Funaki	def.	Kazuo Takahashi	KO (Palm Strikes and Knees)	1	3:09
	Ken Shamrock	def.	Andre Van Den Oetelaar	Submission (Achilles Lock)	1	1:04
	Minoru Suzuki	def.	James Mathews	Submission (Keylock)	1	0:58
	Ryushi Yanagisawa	def.	Vernon White	TKO (Lost Points)	1	8:55
	Takaku Fuke	def.	Katsuomi Inagaki	Submission (Rear-Naked Choke)	1	6:18

== See also ==
- Pancrase
- List of Pancrase champions
- List of Pancrase events
