= Pancrase: Yes, We Are Hybrid Wrestlers 2 =

Pancrase MMA event in 1993

- Promotion: Pancrase
- Date: October 14, 1993
- Venue: Tsuyuhashi Sports Center
- City: Nagoya, Aichi

Event chronology
Pancrase: Yes, We Are Hybrid Wrestlers 1	Pancrase: Yes, We Are Hybrid Wrestlers 2	Pancrase: Yes, We Are Hybrid Wrestlers 3

Pancrase: Yes, We Are Hybrid Wrestlers 2 was a mixed martial arts event held on October 14, 1993 at the Tsuyuhashi Sports Center in Nagoya, Aichi, Japan.

== Background ==
The event featured future King of Pancrase champions Masakatsu Funaki, Bas Rutten, Ken Shamrock, and Minoru Suzuki. Headlining the promotion's second mma event was future UFC Hall of Famer Ken Shamrock against Kazuo Takahashi. Other notable fights on the card were Minoru Suzuki, who took on Vernon White. Pancrase co-founder Funaki took on Ryushi Yanagisawa, while Bas Rutten faced Takaku Fuke.

== Results ==
Main card
Weight class				Method	Round	Time	Notes
	Ken Shamrock	def.	Kazuo Takahashi	Submission (heel hook)	1	12:23
	Minoru Suzuki	def.	Vernon White	Submission (leg scissor choke)	1	2:36
	Masakatsu Funaki	def.	Ryushi Yanagisawa	Submission (kneebar)	1	1:35
	Bas Rutten	def.	Takaku Fuke	KO (knee to the body)	1	2:03
	Katsuomi Inagaki	def.	Joop van de Ven	KO (palm strikes)	1	4:48

== See also ==
- Pancrase
- List of Pancrase champions
- List of Pancrase events
- 1993 in Pancrase
