= Pancrase: Yes, We Are Hybrid Wrestlers 1 =

Pancrase MMA event in 1993

- Promotion: Pancrase
- Date: September 21, 1993
- Venue: Tokyo Bay NK Hall
- City: Urayasu, Chiba
- Attendance: 7,000

Event chronology
Pancrase: Yes, We Are Hybrid Wrestlers 1	Pancrase: Yes, We Are Hybrid Wrestlers 2

Pancrase: Yes, We Are Hybrid Wrestlers 1 was the first mixed martial arts event held by Pancrase Hybrid Wrestling. It took place at the Tokyo Bay NK Hall in Urayasu, Chiba, Japan on September 21, 1993. The card featured many future MMA champions.

== History ==
Pancrase: Yes, We Are Hybrid Wrestlers 1 was the inaugural event of the mixed martial arts promotion Pancrase, which was founded by professional wrestlers Masakatsu Funaki and Minoru Suzuki in 1993. The background of the formation of the organization took place in the pro wrestling organization Fujiwara Gumi. In 1992, a rare legitimate match was booked where Ken Shamrock (fighting as Wayne Shamrock) faced international kickboxing champion Don Nakaya Nielsen. Shamrock took Nielsen down immediately and submitted him with an arm lock in 45 seconds. The success of this match made young pro wrestlers Shamrock, Masakatsu Funaki and Minoru Suzuki question what they had been told since breaking into predetermined wrestling: that nobody would ever pay to see real matches.

Shamrock, Funaki and Suzuki then spearheaded a group of pro wrestlers and decided to abandon everything people had told them about real matches not being marketable./ They formed a promotion called Pancrase, named by ’60s wrestling star Karl Gotch after the sport of Pankration in the ancient Olympics, which combined all different forms of fighting into one sport. Using pro wrestling rules – no closed fist punching to the face (closed fisted punches were allowed to the body), breaks on the ropes, but fighting for real – Shamrock beat Funaki via choke in 6:15 in the main event of the first of what was billed as an all-shoot match pro wrestling show. The show drew an enthusiastic sellout crowd of 7,000 fans, who did not know what they would be seeing, but when it was over, both the fans and media heavily praised this new form of fighting.

The main event featured Pancrase founder and future King of Pancrase Masakatsu Funaki fighting against future UFC Hall of Famer Ken Shamrock. The fight between Shamrock and Funaki was intriguing because Funaki was Shamrock's teacher and trainer. Shamrock ultimately submitted Funaki with an arm triangle choke. The event also saw victories by future MMA champions Minoru Suzuki, and Bas Rutten who won by a palms strike sending Ryushi Yanigsawa to the canvas in 43 seconds. Kazuo Takahashi and Takaku Fuke also won, with Fuke defeating future King of the Cage Light Heavyweight champion Vernon White

== Results ==
Main card
Weight class				Method	Round	Time	Notes
	Ken Shamrock	def.	Masakatsu Funaki	Submission (arm triangle choke)	1	6:15
	Kazuo Takahashi	def.	George Weingeroff	KO (head kick)	1	1:23
	Takaku Fuke	def.	Vernon White	Submission (armbar)	1	1:19
	Bas Rutten	def.	Ryushi Yanagisawa	KO (palm strike and knee)	1	0:43
	Minoru Suzuki	def.	Katsuomi Inagaki	Submission (rear-naked choke)	1	3:25

== See also ==
- Pancrase
- List of Pancrase champions
- List of Pancrase events
- 1993 in Pancrase
