= Pancrase: Yes, We Are Hybrid Wrestlers 4 =

Pancrase MMA event in 1993

- Promotion: Pancrase
- Date: December 8, 1993
- Venue: Hakata Star Lanes
- City: Hakata, Fukuoka, Japan

Event chronology
Pancrase: Yes, We Are Hybrid Wrestlers 3	Pancrase: Yes, We Are Hybrid Wrestlers 4	Pancrase: Pancrash! 1

Pancrase: Yes, We Are Hybrid Wrestlers 4 was a mixed martial arts event held by Pancrase Hybrid Wrestling. It took place at Hakata Star Lanes in Hakata, Fukuoka, Japan on December 8, 1993. The main event featured Prancrase co-founder Masakatsu Funaki fighting against Yoshiki Takahashi. Also appearing on the card were Pancrase veterans Ken Shamrock, and co-founder Minoru Suzuki.

== Results ==
Main card
Weight class				Method	Round	Time	Notes
	Masakatsu Funaki	def.	Kazuo Takahashi	KO (palm strikes and knees)	1	3:09
	Ken Shamrock	def.	Andre van den Oetelaar	Submission (achilles lock)	1	1:04
	Minoru Suzuki	def.	James Mathews	Submission (keylock)	1	0:58
	Ryushi Yanagisawa	def.	Vernon White	TKO (lost points)	1	8:55	(Note: White used all five of his "escapes" and lost the match.)
	Takaku Fuke	def.	Katsuomi Inagaki	Submission (rear-naked choke)	1	6:18

== See also ==
- Pancrase
- List of Pancrase champions
- List of Pancrase events
- 1993 in Pancrase
