= Pancrase: Yes, We Are Hybrid Wrestlers 3 =

Pancrase MMA event in 1993

- Promotion: Pancrase
- Date: November 8, 1993
- Venue: Kobe World Commemoration Hall
- City: Kobe, Hyogo, Japan

Event chronology
Pancrase: Yes, We Are Hybrid Wrestlers 2	Pancrase: Yes, We Are Hybrid Wrestlers 3	Pancrase: Yes, We Are Hybrid Wrestlers 4

Pancrase: Yes, We Are Hybrid Wrestlers 3 was a mixed martial arts event held by Pancrase Hybrid Wrestling. It took place at Kobe World Commemoration Hall in Kobe, Japan on November 8, 1993.

== Background ==
The main event featured Pancrase co-founder Masakatsu Funaki face-off against Cees Bezems. Also on the card was Ken Shamrock, who took on Takaku Fuke. The event also saw the Pancrase debut of former WKA World Kickboxing Heavyweight Champion Maurice Smith in a kickboxing bout against Minoru Suzuki. After the main event had been stopped, both Funaki and Bezems continued to argue & face off, with Funaki claiming Bezems had used closed fists during the fight.

== Results ==
Main card
Weight class				Method	Round	Time	Notes
	Masakatsu Funaki	def.	Cees Bezems	Submission (keylock)	1	1:42
	Maurice Smith	def.	Minoru Suzuki	KO (punch)	3	0:52
	Ken Shamrock	def.	Takaku Fuke	Submission (rear-naked choke)	1	0:44
	Kazuo Takahashi	def.	James Mathews	Submission (armbar)	1	1:11
	Ryushi Yanagisawa	def.	Andre van den Oetelaar	Submission (heel hook)	1	15:51
	Vernon White	def.	Katsuomi Inagaki	TKO (doctor stoppage)	1	22:04

== See also ==
- Pancrase
- List of Pancrase champions
- List of Pancrase events
- 1993 in Pancrase
