= WFA: King of the Streets =

World Fighting Alliance MMA event in 2006

- The poster for WFA: King of the Streets
- Promotion: World Fighting Alliance
- Date: July 22, 2006
- Venue: Great Western Forum
- City: Inglewood, California, United States

Event chronology
| WFA 3: Level 3 | WFA: King of the Streets |

WFA: King of the Streets was a mixed martial arts event held by the World Fighting Alliance on July 22, 2006 at the Great Western Forum in Inglewood, California, USA. This would be the last event held by the World Fighting Alliance. The event was seen live on pay per view in the United States via iN DEMAND, and is the only fight in the 21st century to feature former UFC champion Bas Rutten. Rutten's win over Warpath capped a 22 fight win streak, dating back to 1995, to end his career.

== History ==
Young Danish prospect Martin Kampmann received a call to fight for the heavily promoted WFA King of the Streets card on two days notice. He knocked out his opponent Aguilar in the first round. Four weeks after his win Kampmann made his UFC debut; once again on short notice.

Lindland, who had moved up in weight class from Middleweight for his second match at Light Heavyweight, reportedly made $70,000 US for his match vs. Rampage. This exhibited that it was possible to receive a sizable payday outside of the Ultimate Fighting Championship. This was after being recently dismissed from the UFC in spite of his number 1 contender status for wearing an inappropriate sponsor on his shirt. Lindland stated that moving up in weight was not a problem, and that he could fight at any weight other than lightweight. In a 2012 interview with Cage Potato, Lindland said that his split decision loss to Rampage was his most bitter defeat. He felt that the fix was in and that he clearly won 2 rounds, despite two of the judges calling the fight in favor of Rampage.

Former IFL champ and UFC competitor Matt Horwich is on record with the Baltimore Sun saying that Rampage vs Lindland was one of his favorite fights because of the size difference between the two. He also felt that Lindland did enough to get the decision. Kimo was originally scheduled to fight Rutten and had this to say:

" "I've helped this sport come from bare knuckles, no rules and no excuses to where it is today, and for this man to select me specifically as the target for his comeback is an insult to everything I've accomplished," said Kimo. "This will be the shortest comeback of all time, and Bas will regret the day he chose me for his return to the cage."

However, a failed drug test resulted in him being removed from the card. This was the second time that Kimo had failed a drug test as he failed one two years prior after his UFC 48 loss to Ken Shamrock.

One of the fights on the card was a rematch of a WEC title fight involving Ricco Rodriguez and Ron Waterman. Waterman won the first WEC affair. However, in spite of his issues with the scale, he was able to overcome Ron Waterman and take a victory by referee stoppage at the end of the first round.

King of Queens star Kevin James was also on-hand to corner Bas Rutten for his comeback fight against Warpath.

Bas Rutten failed a post-fight drug test for painkillers following his victory over Warpath, administered by the CSAC.

Attending the event was LA Times sports columnist J.A. Adande who said: "Finally, in Quinton "Rampage" Jackson's split decision victory over Matt Lindland in Saturday night's main event, I saw one of the most amazing feats of strength I've seen in sports. With Lindland trying to choke him into submission, Jackson was somehow able to get to his feet and toss Lindland off."

Color commentary for the event was provided by former National Football League player and professional wrestler Bill Goldberg and Barry Tompkins, formerly of HBO Boxing.

== Results ==
Main card
| Weight class | | | | Method | Round | Time | Notes |
|---|---|---|---|---|---|---|---|
| Light Heavyweight | Quinton Jackson | def. | Matt Lindland | Decision (split) | 3 | 5:00 |
| Heavyweight | Bas Rutten | def. | Ruben Villareal | TKO (leg kicks) | 1 | 3:24 |
| Light Heavyweight | Lyoto Machida | def. | Vernon White | Decision (unanimous) | 3 | 5:00 |
| Light Heavyweight | Jason Miller | def. | Lodune Sincaid | Submission (rear-naked choke) | 1 | 4:29 |
| Middleweight | Ivan Salaverry | def. | Art Santore | TKO (punches) | 2 | 4:18 |
| Super Heavyweight | Ricco Rodriguez | def. | Ron Waterman | TKO (doctor stoppage) | 1 | 5:00 |
| Lightweight | Rob McCullough | def. | Harris Sarmiento | Decision (unanimous) | 3 | 5:00 |
| Light Heavyweight | Marvin Eastman | vs. | Jorge Oliveira | Draw | 3 | 5:00 |
| Middleweight | Martin Kampmann | def. | Edwin Aguilar | TKO (punches) | 1 | 2:43 |
