= Todd Bjornethun =

American mixed martial arts fighter

- Born: United States
- Nationality: American
- Height: 5 ft 9 in (1.75 m)
- Weight: 185 lb (84 kg; 13.2 st)
- Division: Heavyweight; Middleweight
- Fighting out of: Kirkland, Washington, United States
- Years active: 1994 - 1997

Mixed martial arts record
- Total: 12
- Wins: 7
- By knockout: 2
- By submission: 3
- By decision: 2
- Losses: 5
- By submission: 5

Other information
- Mixed martial arts record from Sherdog

Todd Bjornethun is a retired American professional mixed martial artist. He competed for Shooto and Pancrase.

== Mixed martial arts record ==
Professional record breakdown
12 matches	7 wins	5 losses
By knockout	2	0
By submission	3	5
By decision	2	0

Res.	Record	Opponent	Method	Event	Date	Round	Time	Location	Notes
Win	7–5	Kazuhiro Kusayanagi	TKO (punches)	Shooto: Reconquista 4	October 12, 1997	2	4:01	Tokyo, Japan	
Loss	6–5	Allan Goes	Submission (triangle choke)	EF 4: Extreme Fighting 4	March 28, 1997	1	0:30	Des Moines, Iowa, United States	
Win	6–4	Rudyard Moncayo	Submission (heel hook)	EF 3: Extreme Fighting 3	October 18, 1996	1	0:00	Tulsa, Oklahoma, United States	
Win	5–4	Eric Lavigne	KO (punches)	VTJ 1996: Vale Tudo Japan 1996	July 7, 1996	1	6:53	Urayasu, Chiba, Japan	
Win	4–4	Akihiro Gono	Submission (armbar)	Shooto: Vale Tudo Junction 3	May 7, 1996	3	1:12	Tokyo, Japan	
Loss	3–4	Erik Paulson	Submission (guillotine choke)	Shooto: Vale Tudo Junction 1	January 20, 1996	2	0:26	Tokyo, Japan	Middleweight debut.
Win	3–3	Orlando Wiet	Submission (triangle choke)	UFCF: United Full Contact Federation 1	September 8, 1995	1	5:43		
Loss	2–3	Masakatsu Funaki	Submission (armbar)	King of Pancrase tournament opening round	December 16, 1994	1	2:20	Tokyo, Japan	
Win	2–2	Vernon White	Decision (lost points)	Pancrase: Road To The Championship 5	October 15, 1994	1	15:00	Tokyo, Japan	
Loss	1–2	Minoru Suzuki	Submission (armbar)	Pancrase: Road To The Championship 4	September 1, 1994	1	3:11	Osaka, Osaka, Japan	
Win	1–1	Gregory Smit	Decision (unanimous)	Pancrase: Road To The Championship 3	July 26, 1994	1	15:00	Tokyo, Japan	
Loss	0–1	Ryushi Yanagisawa	Submission (heel hook)	Pancrase: Pancrash! 2	March 12, 1994	1	7:12	Nagoya, Aichi, Japan	

== See also ==
- List of male mixed martial artists
