= Vernon White (fighter) =

American mixed martial artist (born 1970)

- Born: Vernon Verdell White; December 3, 1970 (age 55); Sparks, Nevada, United States
- Other names: Tiger
- Height: 6 ft 0 in (1.83 m)
- Weight: 205 lb (93 kg; 14.6 st)
- Division: Light Heavyweight; Middleweight
- Style: Taekwondo, Submission Fighting, Kickboxing, Sambo, Kajukenbo
- Fighting out of: Palo Alto, California, United States
- Team: Lion's Den
- Rank: Black Belt in Taekwondo
- Years active: 1993–2010

Mixed martial arts record
- Total: 61
- Wins: 26
- By knockout: 10
- By submission: 8
- By decision: 7
- By disqualification: 1
- Losses: 33
- By knockout: 5
- By submission: 14
- By decision: 14
- Draws: 2
- No contests: 0

Other information
- Mixed martial arts record from Sherdog

Vernon Verdell White (born December 3, 1970) is an American retired professional mixed martial arts fighter who fought for the Ultimate Fighting Championship (UFC), Pride Fighting Championships, Strikeforce, King of the Cage, Pancrase, the World Fighting Alliance, and the Nevada Lions of the IFL. He is the former King of the Cage Light Heavyweight Championship, and King of the Cage Light Heavyweight Superfight Championship.

== MMA career ==
White, who had a background in Taekwondo, made his professional debut at the age of 22 with the Pancrase organization in Japan after being recruited by Ken Shamrock. He began his career with limited professional experience and recorded a record of 8–17–1 during his initial period with the promotion.

However, White would turn his career around in a big way towards the latter part of the decade. He turned in an impressive showing against MMA legend Kazushi Sakuraba at PRIDE 2, landing a hard punch in the opening seconds to stagger Sakuraba and fighting very competitively, showcasing excellent submission defense and escapes throughout the fight until he was finally caught in an armbar late in round 3.

From 1998 to 2002, White found success in mixed martial arts competition, compiling a record of 9-1 and winning the King of the Cage Middleweight Championship. White defended the title four times before losing a decision to MMA pioneer Jeremy Horn. This was impressive because at the time, King of the Cage was an upper echelon MMA promotion. He evolved into one of the more talented and well known mixed martial arts fighters in the world and developed striking to go along with a submission wrestling base.

White also had impressive showings in the UFC, fighting to a draw with Ian Freeman in a fight that he took on short notice, and also turning in a competitive, hard fought loss to former UFC Light Heavyweight Champion Chuck Liddell at UFC 49 in 2004.

== Professional wrestling career ==
White appeared on the April 7, 1997 airing of the World Wrestling Federation program Raw Is War, losing a worked 'shoot fight' to his Lion’s Den mentor Ken Shamrock.

== Personal life ==
Vernon and his wife Melissa Kline were married on April 30, 2007. The couple had their first child, a son, on May 31, 2008.

== Kickboxing record ==
Kickboxing record
? wins (? KOs), ? losses, ? draws
Date	Result	Opponent	Event	Location	Method	Round	Time
2008-05-31	Win	(United States) Anthony Brown	XFA 2	Las Vegas, Nevada, USA	Decision (unanimous)	3	3:00
2003-08-15	Loss	(Netherlands) Remy Bonjasky	K-1 World Grand Prix 2003 in Las Vegas II	Las Vegas, Nevada, USA, Quarter Finals	KO (flying high kick)	1	1:55
Legend: Win Loss Draw/No contest Notes

== Championships and accomplishments ==
- Ultimate Fighting Championship
  - UFC Encyclopedia Awards
    - Fight of the Night (One time) vs. Chuck Liddell
- King of the Cage
  - King of the Cage Light Heavyweight Championship (One time)
    - Four successful title defenses
  - King of the Cage Light Heavyweight Superfight Championship (One time, first, only)
    - One successful title defense
- World Vale Tudo Championship
  - WVC 2 Tournament Runner Up

== Mixed martial arts record ==
Professional record breakdown
61 matches	26 wins	33 losses
By knockout	10	5
By submission	8	14
By decision	7	14
By disqualification	1	0
Draws	2	

Res.	Record	Opponent	Method	Event	Date	Round	Time	Location	Notes
Loss	26–33–2	Jason MacDonald	Submission (triangle choke)	W1 Bad Blood	March 20, 2010	3	2:12	Montreal, Quebec, Canada	
Loss	26–32–2	Lew Polley	Decision (unanimous)	WarGods 5	May 30, 2009	3	5:00	Alpine, California, United States	
Win	26–31–2	Jeremiah Constant	DQ	XCC 6: Western Threat	April 5, 2008	1	N/A	Reno, Nevada, United States	
Loss	25–31–2	Marcelo Tigre	TKO (hand injury)	X-1: Grand Prix 2007	August 4, 2007	1	3:26	Honolulu, Hawaii, United States	
Loss	25–30–2	Mike Whitehead	TKO (punches)	IFL: Las Vegas	June 16, 2007	2	0:54	Las Vegas, Nevada, United States	
Win	25–29–2	Sam Hoger	Submission (rear naked choke)	IFL: Moline	April 7, 2007	2	3:25	Moline, Illinois, United States	
Loss	24–29–2	Bobby Southworth	Decision (unanimous)	Strikeforce: Triple Threat	December 8, 2006	5	5:00	San Jose, California, United States	For the vacant Strikeforce Light Heavyweight Championship.
Loss	24–28–2	Victor Valimaki	Decision (unanimous)	EF 2: The Ultimate Decision	September 29, 2006	3	5:00	Vancouver, British Columbia, Canada	
Loss	24–27–2	Lyoto Machida	Decision (unanimous)	WFA: King of the Streets	September 29, 2006	3	5:00	Los Angeles, California, United States	
Win	24–26–2	Jason Guida	TKO (doctor stoppage)	WEC 18	January 13, 2006	1	5:00	Lemoore, California, United States	
Win	23–26–2	Alex Stiebling	KO (punch)	WEC 17	October 14, 2005	2	0:09	Lemoore, California, United States	
Loss	22–26–2	Matt Horwich	Submission (rear-naked choke)	SF 12: Breakout	September 16, 2005	2	2:38	Portland, Oregon, United States	
Win	22–25–2	Justin Burgin	Decision (unanimous)	Valor Fighting: Medford Mayhem	July 16, 2005	3	5:00	Medford, Oregon, United States	
Win	21–25–2	Chris Peak	TKO	Valor Fighting: Home of the Brave	July 2, 2005	1	N/A	Susanville, California, United States	
Loss	20–25–2	Chuck Liddell	KO (punch)	UFC 49	August 21, 2004	1	4:05	Las Vegas, Nevada, United States	
Loss	20–24–2	Marvin Eastman	Decision (unanimous)	KOTC 32: Bringing Heat	January 24, 2004	3	5:00	Miami, Florida, United States	
Draw	20–23–2	Ian Freeman	Draw (split)	UFC 43	June 6, 2003	3	5:00	Las Vegas, Nevada, United States	
Loss	20–23–1	Jeremy Horn	Decision (unanimous)	KOTC 23: Sin City	May 16, 2003	5	5:00	Las Vegas, Nevada, United States	Lost the KOTC Light Heavyweight Championship.
Win	20–22–1	Mike Rogers	Decision (split)	KOTC 16: Double Cross	August 2, 2002	3	5:00	San Jacinto, California, United States	Defended the KOTC Light Heavyweight Championship.
Win	19–22–1	James Lee	Submission (heel hook)	KOTC 11: Domination	September 29, 2001	3	1:00	San Jacinto, California, United States	Defended the KOTC Light Heavyweight Championship.
Win	18–22–1	Joe Priole	TKO (punches)	WMMAA 1: MegaFights	August 10, 2001	2	N/A	Atlantic City, New Jersey, United States	
Win	17–22–1	Marvin Eastman	Decision (split)	KOTC 8: Bombs Away	April 29, 2001	3	5:00	Williams, California, United States	Won the inaugural KOTC Light Heavyweight Championship.
Win	16–22–1	David Dodd	KO (flying knee)	KOTC 6: Road Warriors	November 29, 2000	2	3:43	Mt. Pleasant, Michigan, United States	Defended the KOTC Light Heavyweight Superfight Championship.
Win	15–22–1	Marcos da Silva	Submission	IFC: Battleground 2	September 30, 2000	1	N/A	Atlantic City, New Jersey, United States	
Loss	14–22–1	Allan Goes	Decision (unanimous)	PRIDE 9	June 4, 2000	2	10:00	Nagoya, Japan	
Win	14–21–1	Todd Medina	KO (punch)	KOTC 3: Knockout Nightmare	April 15, 2000	1	0:09	San Jacinto, California, United States	Won the KOTC Light Heavyweight Superfight Championship.
Win	13–21–1	Vladimir Matyushenko	Decision (split)	IFC: Montreal Cage Combat	October 9, 1999	1	25:00	Montreal, Quebec, Canada	
Win	12–21–1	David Terrell	Decision (unanimous)	IFC WC 4: Warriors Challenge 4	August 7, 1999	3	5:00	Jackson, California, United States	
Loss	11–21–1	Kazushi Sakuraba	Submission (armbar)	PRIDE 2	March 15, 1998	3	6:53	Yokohama, Japan	
Win	11–20–1	Brian Gassaway	Submission (ankle lock)	WPC: World Pankration Championships 1	October 26, 1997	1	1:26	Texas, United States	
Loss	10–20–1	Vladimir Matyushenko	Submission (neck crank)	IFC 5: Battle in the Bayou	September 5, 1997	1	5:44	Baton Rouge, Louisiana, United States	
Loss	10–19–1	Mario Sperry	Decision (unanimous)	Caged Combat 1: Australian Ultimate Fighting	March 22, 1997	3	5:00	Sydney, Australia	
Loss	10–18–1	Pedro Rizzo	KO (kick)	WVC 2: World Vale Tudo Championship 2	November 10, 1996	1	6:30	Brazil	
Win	10–17–1	Iouri Oulianitski	KO (kick)	WVC 2: World Vale Tudo Championship 2	November 10, 1996	1	1:21	Brazil	
Win	9–17–1	Cees Bezems	Submission (heel hook)	WVC 2: World Vale Tudo Championship 2	November 10, 1996	1	2:10	Brazil	
Loss	8–17–1	Osami Shibuya	Decision (lost points)	Pancrase: Truth 7	October 8, 1996	1	20:00	Nagoya, Japan	
Win	8–16–1	Kazuo Takahashi	KO (head kick)	Pancrase: 1996 Anniversary Show	September 7, 1996	1	19:43	Urayasu, Japan	
Win	7–16–1	Minoru Suzuki	Decision (majority)	Pancrase: 1996 Neo-Blood Tournament, Round 2	July 23, 1996	1	15:00	Tokyo, Japan	
Loss	6–16–1	Masakatsu Funaki	Submission (ankle lock)	Pancrase: Truth 6	June 25, 1996	1	2:34	Fukuoka, Japan	
Draw	6–15–1	Takaku Fuke	Draw (unanimous)	Pancrase: Truth 5	May 16, 1996	1	10:00	Tokyo, Japan	
Loss	6–15	Ryushi Yanagisawa	Submission (ankle lock)	Pancrase: Truth 3	April 7, 1996	1	12:47	Tokyo, Japan	
Win	6–14	Kazuo Takahashi	Decision (lost points)	Pancrase: Truth 3	April 7, 1996	1	10:00	Tokyo, Japan	
Loss	5–14	Frank Shamrock	Submission (achilles lock)	Pancrase: Eyes Of Beast 7	December 14, 1995	1	5:23	Hokkaido, Japan	
Loss	5–13	Katsuomi Inagaki	Decision (majority)	Pancrase: Eyes Of Beast 6	November 4, 1995	1	10:00	Yokohama, Japan	
Loss	5–12	Gregory Smit	Decision (1–0)	Pancrase: 1995 Neo-Blood Tournament Opening Round	July 22, 1995	1	10:00	Tokyo, Japan	
Loss	5–11	Manabu Yamada	Submission (kneebar)	Pancrase: Eyes Of Beast 5	June 13, 1995	1	10:26	Sapporo, Japan	
Win	5–10	Larry Papadopoulos	Submission (heel hook)	Pancrase: Eyes Of Beast 3	April 8, 1995	1	9:54	Nagoya, Japan	
Loss	4–10	Takafumi Ito	Submission (armbar)	Pancrase: Eyes Of Beast 2	March 10, 1995	1	7:26	Yokohama, Japan	
Loss	4–9	Masakatsu Funaki	Submission (straight armbar)	King of Pancrase tournament opening round	December 16, 1994	1	5:37	Tokyo, Japan	
Win	4–8	Leon van Dijk	Submission (heel hook)	King of Pancrase tournament opening round	December 16, 1994	1	3:45	Tokyo, Japan	
Loss	3–8	Todd Bjornethun	Decision (lost points)	Pancrase: Road To The Championship 5	October 15, 1994	1	15:00	Tokyo, Japan	
Win	3–7	Richard Saar	KO (palm strikes)	Pancrase: Road To The Championship 4	September 1, 1994	1	3:25	Osaka, Japan	
Win	2–7	Katsuomi Inagaki	Submission (inverted heel hook)	Pancrase: Road To The Championship 3	July 26, 1994	1	4:15	Tokyo, Japan	
Loss	1–7	Remco Pardoel	Technical Decision (lost points)	Pancrase: Road To The Championship 2	July 6, 1994	1	14:24	Amagasaki, Japan	
Loss	1–6	Bas Rutten	Submission (guillotine choke)	Pancrase: Pancrash! 3	April 21, 1994	1	1:16	Osaka, Japan	
Loss	1–5	Masakatsu Funaki	KO (knee to the body)	Pancrase: Pancrash! 2	March 12, 1994	1	1:13	Nagoya, Japan	
Loss	1–4	Andre Van Den Oetelaar	Submission (forearm choke)	Pancrase: Pancrash! 1	January 19, 1994	1	6:22	Yokohama, Japan	
Loss	1–3	Ryushi Yanagisawa	Technical Decision (lost points)	Pancrase: Yes, We are Hybrid Wrestlers 4	December 8, 1993	1	8:55	Hakata, Japan	
Win	1–2	Katsuomi Inagaki	TKO (doctor stoppage)	Pancrase: Yes, We are Hybrid Wrestlers 3	November 8, 1993	1	22:04	Kobe, Japan	
Loss	0–2	Minoru Suzuki	Submission (leg scissor choke)	Pancrase: Yes, We are Hybrid Wrestlers 2	October 14, 1993	1	2:36	Nagoya, Japan	
Loss	0–1	Takaku Fuke	Submission (armbar)	Pancrase: Yes, We are Hybrid Wrestlers 1	September 21, 1993	1	1:19	Urayasu, Japan	
