= Kazuo Takahashi =

Japanese mixed martial arts fighter

- Born: March 13, 1969 (age 57); Ichikawa, Chiba, Japan
- Other names: Yoshiki Takahashi; Cannibal Yoshiki
- Height: 5 ft 10 in (178 cm)
- Weight: 203 lb (92 kg; 14 st 7 lb)
- Division: Heavyweight; Light Heavyweight; Middleweight
- Style: Karate, Shootfighting, Wrestling
- Stance: Orthodox
- Fighting out of: Tokyo, Japan
- Team: Sengoku Training Players (2008–2011)
- Rank: Black belt in Karate
- Years active: 1993–2013, 2018

Mixed martial arts record
- Total: 62
- Wins: 30
- By knockout: 9
- By submission: 11
- By decision: 9
- By disqualification: 1
- Losses: 28
- By knockout: 18
- By submission: 7
- By decision: 3
- Draws: 3
- No contests: 1

Other information
- Mixed martial arts record from Sherdog

Kazuo Takahashi (高橋 和生, Takahashi Kazuo), ring name Yoshiki Takahashi (高橋 義生, Takahashi Yoshiki; born March 13, 1969), is a Japanese retired mixed martial artist. A professional competitor from 1993 until 2013 (and then once again in 2018), he competed for the UFC, PRIDE Fighting Championships, Pancrase, RINGS, K-1 HERO'S, and World Victory Road. He is the former King of Pancrase Heavyweight Champion.

== Early life and education ==
Takahashi excelled in wrestling, becoming a state champion in Japan, and also trained in karate. He graduated from Yachiyo Shoin High School and Nihon University. He started in Pro Wrestling Fujiwara Gumi in 1992 but joined Pancrase the following year.

== Pancrase ==
Takahashi debuted in mixed martial arts in Pancrase against legally blind yet decorated Wrestler George Weingeroff. The Japanese capitalized on his opponent's inability to see his strikes, and knocked him out with a roundhouse kick. However, it was in his second professional fight in which he gained popularity, becoming known for his incredible toughness and desire to win. Fighting Ken Shamrock, Takahashi suffered a broken jaw from a palm strike and knee and ankle damage from a heel hook, but refused to give up. Takahashi was limping badly for the rest of the bout but continued to fight. Eventually, he got caught in a very tight heel hook and could not escape and was forced to tap. Takahashi had to be carried out of the ring after the fight.

In another memorable showing of heart, Takahashi got caught in a heel hook against Bas Rutten which inevitably broke his shin bone in half. Unwilling to stop the match, Takahashi stood up and continued to fight until, upon kicking Rutten with his broken leg, his shin bone completely snapped in half. His shin didn't bend thanks to the kneeboot he was wearing, but the injury was too much and he finally accepted the match was stopped. It would be a year and a half until Takahashi fought again.

== Ultimate Fighting Championship ==
In 1997, Takahashi had his debut for Ultimate Fighting Championship at the UFC 12 event, where he was pitted against Jiu-Jitsu specialist Wallid Ismail. The fight would become infamous for its irregularities and disregard for the rules, as Takahashi seemed to be uninformed of the event's ruleset while Ismail intentionally ignored it.

Wallid tried to take Kazuo down several times, only for the Japanese to keep balance every time by illegally grabbing the fence despite the referee's continuous warnings. Minutes into the match, Yoshiki knocked down Wallid with a right hook that seemed to end the fight, but the Japanese fighter stood waiting instead of following up, believing his opponent would receive a 10 count like in Pancrase. Takahashi was better informed about the rule allowing low blows, however, and he demonstrated it by shockingly sliding his hand on Ismail's trunks, tearing away his protective cup and hitting multiple knee strikes to the groin. After some more strike exchanges, the Japanese took the Brazilian down and landed headbutts and hammerfists through his guard until the end of the round. As there was no finish, they went into extra round.

New miscommunications would arise at the overtime when Ismail eye-gouged Kazuo, as the Japanese fighter asked for time to check it out, which was refused due to referee Big John McCarthy not noticing the foul. Takahashi also kicked Ismail on the ground, an illegal attack under the UFC ruleset due to his Wrestling shoes. Once cleared up from the confusion, Takahashi dominated the rest of the overtime with effective punches to take the unanimous decision win. He advanced round, but had to pull out due to a hand injury, being replaced by alternate Nick Sanzo.

== Championships and Accomplishments ==
- Pancrase Hybrid Wrestling
  - Pancrase Heavyweight Championship (One time; first)
  - One successful title defense
  - 2000 Pancrase Heavyweight Championship Tournament Winner
- Ultimate Fighting Championship
  - UFC 12 Lightweight Tournament Finalist

== Mixed martial arts record ==
Professional record breakdown
62 matches	30 wins	28 losses
By knockout	9	18
By submission	11	7
By decision	9	3
By disqualification	1	0
Draws	3	
No contests	1	

Res.	Record	Opponent	Method	Event	Date	Round	Time	Location	Notes
Loss	30–28–3 (1)	Duško Todorović	TKO (punches)	Rings: The Outsider 51	July 21, 2018	1	1:41	Kawasaki, Japan	
Loss	30–27–3 (1)	Ryo Kawamura	TKO (punches)	Pancrase 252	September 29, 2013	1	1:43	Yokohama, Japan	Middleweight debut.
Win	30–26–3 (1)	Kenichi Yamamoto	KO (knee)	U-Spirits: Again	March 9, 2013	1	6:29	Tokyo, Japan	
Loss	29–26–3 (1)	Yuji Sakuragi	KO (punch)	Pancrase: Progress Tour 9	August 5, 2012	1	4:59	Tokyo, Japan	
Win	29–25–3 (1)	Lee Chang-seob	Submission (scarf hold armlock)	World Victory Road Presents: Sengoku 15	October 30, 2010	1	2:28	Tokyo, Japan	
Loss	28–25–3 (1)	Antony Rea	TKO (punches)	Fury 1	May 21, 2010	1	N/A	Macau SAR, China	
Loss	28–24–3 (1)	Valentijn Overeem	KO (flying knee)	World Victory Road Presents: Sengoku 4	August 24, 2008	1	2:42	Saitama, Japan	Heavyweight bout.
Loss	28–23–3 (1)	Fábio Silva	KO (knee)	World Victory Road Presents: Sengoku 3	June 8, 2008	2	0:25	Saitama, Japan	
Loss	28–22–3 (1)	Mark Burch	KO (knee)	BodogFight: Alvarez vs. Lee	July 14, 2007	1	3:45	Trenton, New Jersey, United States	
Loss	28–21–3 (1)	Melvin Manhoef	TKO (punches)	Hero's 8	March 12, 2007	1	2:36	Nagoya, Japan	
NC	28–20–3 (1)	Mark Burch	NC (accidental eye poke)	BodogFight: Costa Rica	February 18, 2007	1	1:05	San José, Costa Rica	
Loss	28–20–3	Vitor Belfort	KO (punch)	Pride Critical Countdown Absolute	July 1, 2006	1	0:36	Saitama, Japan	Return to Light Heavyweight.
Win	28–19–3	Kestutis Arbocius	Decision (majority)	Pancrase: Spiral 8	October 2, 2005	3	5:00	Yokohama, Japan	
Win	27–19–3	Yuji Sakuragi	Submission (armbar)	Pancrase: Spiral 5	July 10, 2005	2	3:01	Yokohama, Japan	
Loss	26–19–3	Igor Vovchanchyn	KO (punch)	Pride 29	February 20, 2005	1	1:10	Saitama, Japan	Light Heavyweight bout.
Loss	26–18–3	Heath Herring	KO (punches)	Pride Total Elimination 2004	April 25, 2004	1	4:53	Saitama, Japan	2004 Pride Heavyweight Grand Prix Round of 16.
Loss	26–17–3	Josh Barnett	Submission (triangle armbar)	New Japan Pro Wrestling: Ultimate Crush 2	October 13, 2003	2		Tokyo, Japan	For the Pancrase Openweight Championship.
Win	26–16–3	Tsuyoshi Ozawa	TKO (doctor stoppage)	Pancrase: 2003 Neo-Blood Tournament Opening Round	July 27, 2003	1	5:00	Tokyo, Japan	Defended the Pancrase Heavyweight Championship.
Win	25–15–3	Hideki Tadao	Decision (majority)	Pancrase: Spirit 6	August 25, 2002	3	5:00	Osaka, Japan	
Win	24–15–3	Katsuhisa Fujii	TKO (punches)	Pancrase: Proof 7	December 1, 2001	1	1:12	Yokohama, Japan	Won the Pancrase Heavyweight Tournament and the inaugural Pancrase Heavyweight Championship.
Win	23–15–3	Marcelo Tigre	DQ (eye gouging)	Pancrase: 2001 Anniversary Show	September 30, 2001	1	3:20	Yokohama, Japan	Pancrase Heavyweight Tournament Semifinal.
Win	22–15–3	Hiroya Takada	Submission (guillotine choke)	Pancrase: 2001 Anniversary Show	September 30, 2001	2	0:22	Pancrase Heavyweight Tournament Quarterfinal.	
Win	21–15–3	Katsuomi Inagaki	Technical Submission (arm-triangle choke)	Pancrase: Proof 5	August 25, 2001	1	1:38	Osaka, Japan	
Win	20–15–3	David Frendin	TKO (punches)	Pancrase: Proof 4	June 26, 2001	1	0:26	Tokyo, Japan	
Win	19–15–3	Mitsuyoshi Sato	Decision (unanimous)	Pancrase: Proof 1	February 4, 2001	3	5:00	Tokyo, Japan	
Loss	18–15–3	Sanae Kikuta	Submission (arm-triangle choke)	Pancrase: Trans 7	December 4, 2000	1	7:22	Tokyo, Japan	
Win	18–14–3	Masutatsu Yano	Decision (unanimous)	Pancrase: 2000 Neo-Blood Tournament Second Round	August 27, 2000	1	10:00	Osaka, Japan	
Loss	17–14–3	Semmy Schilt	TKO (punches)	Pancrase: Trans 3	April 30, 2000	1	7:30	Yokohama, Japan	For the Pancrase Openweight Championship.
Win	17–13–3	John Cronk	TKO (submission to elbows and headbutts)	Pancrase: Breakthrough 11	December 18, 1999	1	7:59	Yokohama, Japan	
Win	16–13–3	Osami Shibuya	Submission (guillotine choke)	Pancrase: 1999 Anniversary Show	September 18, 1999	1	6:08	Tokyo, Japan	
Draw	15–13–3	John Lober	Draw (unanimous)	Pancrase: Breakthrough 6	June 11, 1999	2	3:00	Tokyo, Japan	
Win	15–13–2	Omar Bouiche	Submission (armbar)	Pancrase: Breakthrough 4	April 18, 1999	1	8:47	Yokohama, Japan	
Win	14–13–2	Minoru Suzuki	TKO (palm strikes)	Pancrase: 1998 Anniversary Show	September 14, 1998	1	8:06	Tokyo, Japan	
Draw	13–13–2	Katsuomi Inagaki	Draw (unanimous)	Pancrase: Advance 8	June 21, 1998	2	3:00	Kobe, Japan	
Loss	13–13–1	Semmy Schilt	TKO (palm strikes)	Pancrase: Advance 6	May 12, 1998	1	5:44	Tokyo, Japan	
Win	13–12–1	Leon van Dijk	Decision (unanimous)	Pancrase: Advance 4	March 18, 1998	2	3:00	Tokyo, Japan	
Loss	12–12–1	Osami Shibuya	Submission (kneebar)	Pancrase: Advance 2	February 6, 1998	1	9:35	Yokohama, Japan	
Loss	12–11–1	Yuki Kondo	Submission (arm-triangle choke)	Pancrase: Alive 10	November 16, 1997	1	7:27	Kobe, Japan	
Win	12–10–1	Kim Jong-wang	TKO (knees)	Pancrase: Alive 9	October 29, 1997	1	1:06	Tokyo, Japan	
Loss	11–10–1	Jason Godsey	Submission (rear-naked choke)	Pancrase: 1997 Anniversary Show	September 6, 1997	2	1:20	Tokyo, Japan	
Loss	11–9–1	Jason DeLucia	Submission (armbar)	Pancrase: Alive 5	May 24, 1997	1	5:13	Kobe, Japan	
Win	11–8–1	Satoshi Hasegawa	TKO (palm strikes)	Pancrase: Alive 4	April 27, 1997	1	6:20	Tokyo, Japan	
Loss	10–8–1	Semmy Schilt	TKO (palm strikes)	Pancrase: Alive 3	March 22, 1997	1	7:00	Nagoya, Japan	Return to Heavyweight.
Win	10–7–1	Wallid Ismail	Decision	UFC 12	February 7, 1997	1	15:00	Dothan, Alabama, United States	Light Heavyweight debut. UFC 12 Lightweight Tournament Semifinal.
Win	9–7–1	Keiichiro Yamamiya	Submission (guillotine choke)	Pancrase: Truth 9	November 9, 1996	1	7:12	Kobe, Japan	
Loss	8–7–1	Vernon White	KO (head kick)	Pancrase: 1996 Anniversary Show	September 7, 1996	1	19:43	Tokyo, Japan	
Win	8–6–1	Ryushi Yanagisawa	Decision (lost points)	Pancrase: 1996 Neo-Blood Tournament, Round 1	July 22, 1996	1	15:00	Tokyo, Japan	
Draw	7–6–1	Manabu Yamada	Draw (split)	Pancrase: Truth 6	June 25, 1996	1	10:00	Fukuoka, Japan	
Win	7–6	Takafumi Ito	Decision (unanimous)	Pancrase: Truth 5	May 16, 1996	1	10:00	Tokyo, Japan	
Loss	6–6	Vernon White	Decision (lost points)	Pancrase: Truth 3	April 7, 1996	1	10:00	Tokyo, Japan	
Loss	6–5	Jason DeLucia	KO (head kick)	Pancrase: Truth 2	March 2, 1996	1	3:37	Kobe, Japan	
Loss	6–4	Ken Shamrock	Decision (lost points)	Pancrase: Truth 1	January 28, 1996	1	20:00	Yokohama, Japan	
Win	6–3	Scott Bessac	KO (palm strikes)	Pancrase: Eyes of Beast 6	November 4, 1995	1	2:26	Yokohama, Japan	
Win	5–3	Osami Shibuya	Submission (arm-triangle choke)	Pancrase: 1995 Anniversary Show	September 1, 1995	1	5:12	Tokyo, Japan	
Loss	4–3	Bas Rutten	TKO (knee injury)	Pancrase: Road to the Championship 1	May 31, 1994	1	1:37	Tokyo, Japan	
Win	4–2	Andre Van Den Oetelaar	Decision (lost points)	Pancrase: Pancrash! 3	April 21, 1994	1	30:00	Osaka, Japan	
Win	3–2	Katsuomi Inagaki	Technical Submission (rear-naked choke)	Pancrase: Pancrash! 1	January 19, 1994	1	5:41	Yokohama, Japan	
Loss	2–2	Masakatsu Funaki	KO (palm strikes and knees)	Pancrase: Yes, We Are Hybrid Wrestlers 4	December 8, 1993	1	3:09	Hakata-ku, Japan	
Win	2–1	James Mathews	Submission (armbar)	Pancrase: Yes, We Are Hybrid Wrestlers 3	November 8, 1993	1	1:11	Kobe, Japan	
Loss	1–1	Ken Shamrock	Submission (heel hook)	Pancrase: Yes, We Are Hybrid Wrestlers 2	October 14, 1993	1	12:23	Nagoya, Japan	
Win	1–0	George Weingeroff	KO (palm strikes)	Pancrase: Yes, We Are Hybrid Wrestlers 1	September 21, 1993	1	1:23	Tokyo, Japan	Heavyweight debut.

=== Mixed rules ===
Professional record breakdown
1 match	1 win	0 losses
By knockout	0	0
By submission	1	0
By decision	0	0

Res.	Record	Opponent	Method	Event	Date	Round	Time	Location	Notes
Win	1–0	Superman Sattasaba	Submission (scarf hold)	PWFG Stack of Arms	October 4, 1992	1	2:37	Tokyo, Japan	
