= Bas Rutten =

Dutch kickboxer, professional wrestler and mixed martial arts fighter (born 1965)

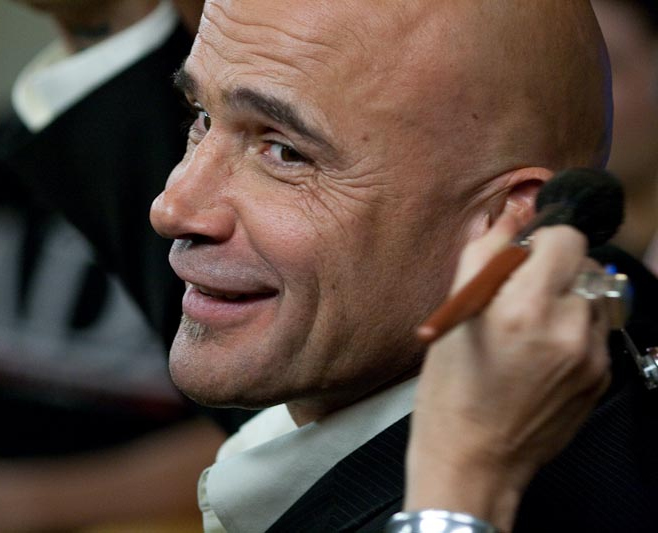
- Rutten in 2009
- Born: Sebastiaan Rutten; 24 February 1965 (age 61); Tilburg, Netherlands
- Other names: El Guapo ("The Handsome One")
- Height: 6 ft 1 in (1.85 m)
- Weight: 205 lb (93 kg; 14 st 9 lb)
- Division: Heavyweight; Openweight
- Fighting out of: Los Angeles, California, US
- Trainer: Cor Hemmers; Chris Dolman; Roland Jansen; Wim Vlieger; Masakatsu Funaki; Mekki Benazzouz
- Rank: 5th dan black belt in Kyokushin Karate; 2nd dan black belt in Taekwondo; 2nd dan black belt in Shintai Karate; Black belt in Brazilian Jiu-Jitsu; Certified instructor in Pancrase Hybrid Wrestling
- Years active: 1993–1999, 2006

Kickboxing record
- Total: 16
- Wins: 14
- By knockout: 14
- Losses: 2

Mixed martial arts record
- Total: 33
- Wins: 28
- By knockout: 11
- By submission: 14
- By decision: 3
- Losses: 4
- By submission: 3
- By decision: 1
- Draws: 1

Other information
- Spouse: Karin Rutten (m. 2003)
- Children: 3
- Website: basrutten.com
- Mixed martial arts record from Sherdog

YouTube information
- Channel: BasRutten
- Subscribers: 317 thousand
- Views: 25.1 million
- Last updated: 17 January 2026

Sebastiaan Rutten (Dutch pronunciation: [ˈbɑs ˈrʏtə(n)]; born 24 February 1965) is a Dutch and American actor, former mixed martial artist, kickboxer and professional wrestler. As a kickboxer, he fought 16 times, winning the first 14 matches by knockout, 13 in the first round, and losing his final two fights, one of them against Frank Lobman for the European Muay Thai title in 1991, with Rutten losing by knockout in the first round. In MMA, he was a UFC Heavyweight Champion and a three-time King of Pancrase world champion. After his submission loss to Ken Shamrock in 1995, he finished his MMA career on a 22 fight unbeaten streak (21 wins, 1 draw).

As a professional fighter, one of his most commonly used strikes was the liver shot (both punch and kick), and he popularized its use in MMA. He competed in Japanese professional wrestling following his Pancrase tenure. Since his retirement, he has worked as a color commentator in several martial arts organizations, including Pride and Karate Combat (KC), and has appeared in numerous television shows, movies, and video games. From 2007 to 2016, he was the co-host of Inside MMA on AXS TV. Rutten also coaches MMA and has authored several instructional materials.

In 2008, Rutten was ranked by Inside MMA as the fourth-greatest mixed martial arts fighter of all time. In 2015, he was inducted into the UFC Hall of Fame. In 2018, he was also inducted into the International Sports Hall of Fame.

== Early life ==
Rutten was born in Tilburg, Netherlands. At the age of six, he developed eczema and severe asthma. Due to his eczema, he always wore long sleeves, turtle necks and gloves, as well as bandages at night. Due to his asthma, he struggled with prolonged physical activity. He was often bullied as a child, although he hid it from his parents. He learned to climb trees and jump between treetops to evade his bullies, who eventually stopped chasing him when one of them fell while trying to follow him.

Rutten started training in boxing in the backyard of an elementary school with a friend. Rutten became interested in martial arts at age 12 after his family went on vacation to France, where the movie Enter the Dragon starring Bruce Lee was playing at a local movie theatre. Bas was underage for the movie's 17+ age guidelines, so he and his brother Sjoerd snuck into the theatre. After he saw the movie, he took an interest in martial arts. Afterwards, Rutten built a makeshift nunchaku to emulate Lee.

At first, his parents did not allow him to pursue his interest, but at age 14, they allowed him to practice taekwondo. At some point after he had begun training, Rutten got into a physical altercation with another child, after which the police were called and Rutten was prohibited by his parents from further practicing martial arts.

At age 21, he moved out of his parents' house, going to work as a chef while he attended culinary school for four years. He also started training taekwondo once again, leading to him later earning a 2nd-degree black belt. He also began learning Kyokushin karate and earned his second 2nd-degree black belt.

== Kickboxing career ==
Rutten started competing in kickboxing at the age of 20 while working also as a bouncer and model. He fought 16 times, winning the first 14 matches by knockout, 13 in the first round, and losing his final two fights. One of his losses came against Frank Lobman for the European Muay Thai title on 12 February 1991, with Rutten losing by KO in the first round. According to Rutten, he signed up for the match while under the influence and without any kind of earlier preparation, but fought anyway. After the match, Rutten ended his kickboxing career. His second to last fight was against Rene Rooze, who bit Rutten's ear during the match. In response, Bas landed a knee to the groin, which interrupted the bout and caused a brawl.

== Mixed martial arts career ==
=== Early career ===
Rutten began his professional mixed martial arts career when he was working as an entertainer. He was scouted by Chris Dolman and invited to train at the Fighting Network RINGS Holland dojo. In 1993, when Japanese pro wrestlers Masakatsu Funaki and Minoru Suzuki traveled to the Netherlands to scout fighters for their new "hybrid wrestling" organization, Pancrase, Rutten was chosen after knocking out the RINGS champion in sparring. A precursor to modern mixed martial arts, the organization was the first of its kind and featured fighting with no closed fisted strikes to the face, and featured now-known fighters such as Frank Shamrock, Vernon White, Maurice Smith, Ken Shamrock, and Guy Mezger.

=== Pancrase ===
==== 1993 ====
In September 1993, Rutten debuted in Pancrase against the 45lb heavier Ryushi Yanagisawa, knocking him out with palm strikes and knee strikes 48 seconds into the bout. Due to injuries sustained during the match, Yanagisawa was hospitalized for two days. Rutten's second match was against Takaku Fuke, which Rutten won.

==== 1994 ====
His third match would be his first loss in Pancrase, as he faced Pancrase founder Masakatsu Funaki. Rutten was submitted by Funaki via a toehold. Afterwards, Rutten started taping Pancrase trainings and practicing moves with his trainee Leon Van Dijk.

In his next fight, Rutten submitted Japanese wrestler Kazuo "Yoshiki" Takahashi with an inverted heel hook. The hold itself, which Rutten had learned the previous day by watching it in a promo, broke Takahashi's shin. Rutten was awarded an honorary 5th-degree black belt in Kyokushin Budokai by Jon Bluming after the match. Rutten's next bout was against Pancrase co-founder Minoru Suzuki, which Rutten won via TKO due to a liver strike.

20 days later, Rutten faced future UFC Hall of Famer Ken Shamrock, who was then one of the best Pancrase fighters. In preparation for the match, Rutten had trained in shoot wrestling with Masakatsu Funaki. Rutten lost the match due to a rear naked choke by Shamrock. After this, Rutten decided to omit strikes from his training and focus only on grappling, submitting Brazilian jiu-jitsu black belt Jason DeLucia with a guillotine choke.

In December 1994, Rutten participated in the inaugural King of Pancrase tournament, where the winner would be crowned the first champion of Pancrase. Rutten was one of the four #1 seeds in the tournament, and his first fight was against MMA newcomer and future UFC champion Frank Shamrock. Rutten lost the match in a majority decision.

==== 1995 ====
In his next match, Rutten submitted King of Pancrase tournament finalist Manabu Yamada on 26 January 1995 with an arm triangle choke from half guard. Rutten later was booked for a rematch and a title shot against tournament winner and then-current King of Pancrase Ken Shamrock for the King of Pancrase title on 10 March, in which Rutten was submitted via a kneebar.

As a result of the match, Rutten started training 2 to 3 times a day solely on submissions. In his next bout, Rutten submitted Takaku Fuke with an armbar from the guard and a finishing heel hook. He then faced American kickboxing champion Maurice Smith. Rutten submitted Smith a figure-four toehold to win the match. Rutten then submitted Jason DeLucia, and was booked for a rematch with Frank Shamrock on 23 July. Their fight was similar to the first bout, with both men trading positions and holds, with Rutten taking a split decision victory.

The win granted him a challenge title match in September 1995 against the King of Pancrase champion Minoru Suzuki, a rematch from their fight at the beginning of both men's careers. Late in the match, Rutten landed a front kick to the body which knocked down Suzuki and followed with a guillotine choke, submitting Suzuki.

Rutten took time away due to an injury, later returning in a rematch against Maurice Smith, which Rutten earned a submission win via a rear naked choke. Rutten's next match was against Ryushi Yanagisawa, who Rutten fought in his Pancrase debut. Rutten broke his hand during the match, but earned a submission victory via a rear naked .

==== 1996 ====
In March 1996, Rutten faced Lion's Den fighter and future Ultimate Fighting Championship winner Guy Mezger, who Rutten submitted via a heel hook.

On 16 May 1996, Rutten defended his title against Frank Shamrock in their third match, which was also for Shamrock's interim King of Pancrase title. During the fight, Shamrock gained north-south position several times, but was unable to submit Rutten, and Rutten in turn knocked him down with an open-handed uppercut. Frank taunted Rutten by sticking out his tongue during a leglock exchange, causing Bas to hit him in the face with a closed-fisted punch, losing a point by red card. Rutten won the fight by doctor's stoppage and ruled TKO due to an eye cut, unifying the King of Pancrase belts.

Right after his match against Shamrock, Rutten had his rubber match against Jason DeLucia. The fight was controversial for DeLucia repeatedly claiming Rutten had hit him with a closed fist, causing Rutten to be issued a yellow card and later a red card. In response, Rutten hit several shots to DeLucia's liver, rupturing it.

At the Pancrase 1996 Anniversary Show, taking place on 7 September, Rutten defended his undisputed title against Masakatsu Funaki. Funaki frequently used a knee-on-stomach technique and a mount position to initiate leglocks, and later landed an illegal kick to a downed Rutten. Later in the fight, Rutten knocked Funaki down twice with palm and knee strikes, eventually landing a knee to the face and earning a knockout victory, becoming a three-time King of Pancrase.

Rutten described the war with Funaki in an interview:

Before the fight when he came to me, he made that thumb over the neck, throat slashing motion like I was going to go down. I turned to my manager and said, "Okay, now I'm going to kill this guy, you watch". My game plan was to keep the fight going for 15 minutes ... Funaki had never fought above 15 minutes. But then, like 12 minutes into it, while I'm still on my knees he kicks me in the head. I block, but for me that was an illegal thing to do. So right away I start, BANG, BANG, BANG, and he goes down. From that moment on, I totally destroyed him. You got to see the fight; it was a massacre. My palms were black from hitting him so hard. He had the gods on his side or something, because he stood up every time. I hit his face back on the mat and you hear it slam into the mat. His nose is all the way to the side, broke, they have to straighten it out. I go, "Oh my God, this guy can take a shot!" I kneed him so hard in the head. He went down four times. But the last knee I gave to him was like everything I had. I grabbed him by the head and kneed him. It was really like a Rocky movie. I'm standing there and I fall backwards, and I'm totally out of breath. I get up and the referee holds my hand up. Then he lets my hand go and I drop again, BOOM! I was exhausted, I gave everything I had; I really wanted to destroy him. I broke his cheekbones and broke his nose, just because he said he was going to kill me. Oh, I was so angry at him. But afterwards, friends again ... What a crazy sport this is, huh?

His next fight was a rematch with Manabu Yamada, in which Rutten earned a toehold submission victory 54 seconds into the bout. Following the match, Rutten relinquished his title to be present for the birth of his second daughter.

==== 1997 ====
On 22 March 1997 Rutten returned to Pancrase in a match against Osami Shibuya, fighting to a draw after breaking his sternum during the bout. Rutten later had a rematch with Shibuya, earning a submission victory` spinal lock from an ura-gatame position that he nicknamed the "Bas Rutten Neck Crank."

Rutten earned 8 more victories in his Pancrase career, bringing his unbeaten streak up to 19 straight fights.

Rutten left Pancrase as one of the most dominant fighters in the history of the organization. Rutten agreed to come out of retirement to fight Ken Shamrock in PRIDE FC, however, Shamrock stated that he already beat Rutten twice and that a third time wasn't necessary. Later, in 2002, Rutten said that he would not fight Shamrock again even if it was offered to him, due to the friendship they developed over the years, and that he could not put his mind and heart into fighting Ken again.

In 1997, Rutten was featured on the cover of Karaté Bushido, the oldest magazine dedicated to martial arts in Europe, joining martial artists such as Bruce Lee (1974), Jean-Claude Van Damme (1993), Rickson Gracie (1998), Jackie Chan (2000), Fedor Emelianenko (2007), Georges St-Pierre (2008), Jérôme Le Banner (2012), Francis Ngannou (2019), and Dave Leduc (2020).

=== Ultimate Fighting Championship ===
==== UFC Heavyweight Champion ====
Rutten originally learned about the Ultimate Fighting Championship (UFC) before its first event in 1993, when future UFC competitor Ken Shamrock proposed fighting in the organization to him, but Rutten decided to stay in Pancrase, as he felt the "no rules" format was too dangerous and he did not want to risk his career. Despite this, Rutten later signed with the UFC in 1998, after his Pancrase career. Rutten entered the UFC with a 19 fight unbeaten streak and was touted by the organization as the "world's greatest martial artist."

Rutten was originally scheduled to fight heavyweight champion Randy Couture in a title match for the UFC Heavyweight Championship in his first fight, but due to a contract dispute, Couture left the UFC to sign with a different promotion. The title was then stripped from Couture and a tournament was held for the vacant belt. In his UFC debut, Rutten faced Fighting Network RINGS fighter Tsuyoshi Kosaka at UFC 18. Rutten earned a knockout victory with a minute remaining in the fight's overtime period. The fight was deemed controversial as referee John McCarthy stood the fighters up when Kosaka was mounted on Rutten and actively landing punches.

On 7 May 1999, at UFC 20, Rutten faced Kevin Randleman for the UFC Heavyweight Championship in which Rutten earned a split decision victory, becoming UFC Heavyweight Champion. This victory was deemed controversial by fans and fighters, such as Randleman's corner and Mark Coleman, who criticized the judges' decision. Fight judging at that point was not based on the current 10-point must system, but on whom the judges felt won the fight overall.

Rutten vacated the title later in the year, in order to drop down to what was at the time middleweight (now known as light heavyweight) a weight closer to his natural weight, in a bid to try to become the first person to hold a UFC title in two weight classes. While training for his next UFC fight in 1999, he suffered multiple injuries, blowing out his knee, tearing his biceps, and injuring his neck. He was forced to retire from MMA competition under doctor's orders.

He was offered a fight against Kazushi Sakuraba when he was contacted by Pride Fighting Championships, but Rutten declined due to the size of the fight purse being offered, later agreeing to join the organization as a color commentator. He was replaced by Wanderlei Silva in the card.

==== UFC Hall of Fame ====
On 22 May 2015, UFC President Dana White appeared on Inside MMA to announce that Rutten would be inducted into the UFC Hall of Fame during International Fight Week in July. Rutten is the first European to be inducted, entering the "Pioneers" wing of the UFC's new-look Hall of Fame.

Former UFC Light Heavyweight Champion Tito Ortiz has credited Rutten for inspiration during his early days. Ortiz said; "I looked up to Bas Rutten. Bas was my idol. People were just so scared of fighting him, he was like the man. I thought that was what I need to do now. If I train as hard as he does then one day I'll be as good as him and two years later look where I am, I'm on top of the world. I've got to say thanks to him, (Bas) for helping me out by making me believe in dreams."

=== Last fight ===
In May 2006, Rutten announced he was cleared by doctors and would make his return to MMA competition. Rutten was slated to face Kimo Leopoldo in the now-defunct World Fighting Alliance on 22 July 2006, at The Forum in Inglewood, California. Two days before the event, Kimo tested positive for Stanozolol, an anabolic steroid. In place of Kimo, Rutten fought Ruben "Warpath" Villareal. Rutten earned a first round TKO victory via leg kicks, bringing his professional record to 28 wins, 4 losses, and 1 draw. After the fight, Rutten tested positive for hydrocodone, morphine, and diphenhydramine.

== Professional wrestling career ==
Rutten competed in Japanese professional wrestling following his Pancrase tenure. He made his debut at the Inoki Bom-Ba-Ye 2000 event, where he teamed up with Alexander Otsuka to defeat the team of Naoki Sano and Ricco Rodríguez, with Rutten submitting Sano with a crossface chickenwing. He also wrestled in Battlarts, defeating Carl Malenko by KO via palm strike.

In 2002, Rutten debuted in New Japan Pro-Wrestling as a part of Antonio Inoki's MMA army. Before his first match, he was featured in vignettes learning the shining wizard from watching Keiji Mutoh tapes in order to adapt to NJPW professional wrestling. He mostly wrestled in singles matches, earning wins over Manabu Nakanishi, Hiroshi Tanahashi and Masayuki Naruse. In July 2002, he challenged for the IWGP Heavyweight Championship against Yuji Nagata, but he was defeated. After three months, in October, he was featured in a special European Catch Wrestling Rules Match against Osamu Nishimura with Tony St. Clair as a special referee. The match went to a time limit draw after ten rounds, despite Nishimura's illegal blows. The same month, Rutten dropped down to the junior heavyweight division and received another title match, this time against Koji Kanemoto for the IWGP Junior Heavyweight Championship, in which he lost the bout. His last professional match was on October 26, 2002 when he lost to Koji Kanemoto.

== Post-fight career ==
After his retirement from fighting in 1999, Rutten focused on becoming an actor, getting small parts on TV shows such as Martial Law, 18 Wheels of Justice, The King of Queens, "Lights Out", and the Canadian series Freedom, as well as appearing in low budget movies such as Shadow Fury, The Eliminator, and the comedy short The Kingdom of Ultimate Power which was featured in the 2005 L.A. Film Festival. It also won the first prize at the short film festival in NY for "best comedy".

Rutten was also the color commentator for the English productions of Pride Fighting Championships events, calling nearly every event from Pride 1 through the 2005 Grand Prix. Known for his sense of humor and first-hand knowledge of the sport, Rutten quickly became a fan favorite commentator. In April 2006 he announced that he would not continue to announce for Pride, due to the constant commutes to Japan and being away from his family.

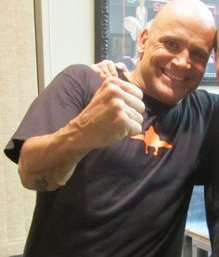
Rutten in 2011

Rutten has a cameo in the video game Grand Theft Auto IV on the in-game TV show called "The Men's Room." He also did motion capture for the main character's fighting moves. He said that when he arrived at the motion-capture place in New York, he asked the people in charge how violent they wanted to have it and they told him to "give it all he got". After two hours they stopped him and said, "It's OK, you don't have to go any further".

He was also featured in WCW vs. the World for the PlayStation, but was named "Thunder Dome" to avoid copyright laws.

On 23 January 2008, he was announced as the new Vice President of Fighter Operations reporting directly to IFL CEO Jay Larkin. His role was to build relations between the IFL and its fighters as well as work on potential match-ups between fighters. He also hosted the weekly shows "Battleground" and "International Fight League" with Kenny Rice. This ended when IFL went out of business in late 2008.

In 2009, he appeared in the music video for Listen to Your Friends by the rock band New Found Glory, "fighting" lead vocalist Jordan Pundik. Bas and Rice hosted Inside MMA, a weekly MMA variety show on AXS TV. The pair also did remote English commentary and play-by-play for Dream events broadcast in North America on HDNet. The pair were eventually replaced by Guy Mezger and Michael Schiavello, who attended the events live in Japan. He would also appear in several public health service ads, airing on Cartoon Network as part of the network's "Get Healthy" campaign. He also made a public service announcement against trying out MMA at home.

Rutten was featured in the 2012 American sports comedy movie Here Comes the Boom alongside Kevin James and Henry Winkler. Rutten played the role of a former MMA fighter and Dutch immigrant Niko trying to gain US citizenship. In return for his help in gaining citizenship, Niko helps train 42-year-old biology teacher Scott (Kevin James) to become a MMA fighter in the UFC. The film also features former UFC fighter Krzysztof Soszynski, former Muay Thai kickboxer Mark DellaGrotte along with cameo roles for Bruce Buffer, Chael Sonnen, Jason Miller, Satoshi Ishii, Mark Muñoz, Herb Dean, Wanderlei Silva, and Joe Rogan amongst others.

On 23 October 2013, the World Series of Fighting announced Rutten as a member of the broadcast team for WSOF events on NBCSN along with Todd Harris.

Rutten currently works as a commentator for Karate Combat (KC).

=== Coaching ===
Rutten is certified as an instructor of both MTBN Thai Boxing and mixed martial arts, as well as krav maga.

Rutten coached Mark Kerr during the filming of the HBO documentary The Smashing Machine.

In 2006, Rutten was a team coach for the International Fight League, an MMA organization that focused on team combat. His team, the Anacondas, defeated the Silverbacks 3–2. He is also a former investor in the Legends MMA gym in Hollywood and used to teach there occasionally, and is now a part owner of the MMA gym Bas Rutten's Elite Mixed Martial Arts in Thousand Oaks, California. He teaches a MMA class on Tuesdays.

He has also trained former street fighter Kimbo Slice for his professional MMA bouts, as well as professional wrestler Samoa Joe.

== Fighting style ==
Rutten's main reason for success in Pancrase was his well-rounded fighting style, excelling both in striking and grappling. His stand-up offensive, learned from the Dutch school of Muay Thai, Karate and Taekwondo was aggressive yet deceptively technical. According to Frank Shamrock, it often intimidated other fighters. According to Shamrock, "His kickboxing was devastating. It was something everybody feared. The other thing he had was a basic understanding of real fighting ... Bas had that street fighter mentality."

One of his commonly used tactics in the ring was using push kicks against the ring ropes before using palm strikes and strikes to the body. Rutten never developed an effective takedown defense, but he was apt at landing strikes while being taken down, having knocked out opponents before they could complete the technique.

Being self-taught, Rutten initially focused on defense rudiments learned from Chris Dolman. His grappling style was patterned after Pancrase's native shoot wrestling (better known as "Catch wrestling" in the west), and he focused on chokeholds, leglocks, and submission defense, helping against grapplers like Masakatsu Funaki and Minoru Suzuki.

== Personal life ==
Rutten currently lives in Austin, Texas, with his wife Karin and two daughters. Rutten also has a daughter from his first wife. He became a citizen of the United States in the 1990s. At the end of 2015, he became a grandfather for the first time: a grandson, who currently lives in Belgium.

Rutten is friends with fellow Dutchman and former UFC competitor Gerard Gordeau.

Rutten is known by the moniker "El Guapo", which means "The Handsome One" in Spanish.

He became known for the victory celebration known as "Rutten Jump", in which he would do a jumping split after winning a fight. Rutten talked about the origins of the Rutten Jump on his website: "When I won my first fight in Pancrase, I was so hyped that I jumped up in the splits to each side of the ring. Why? I don't know. But, it became my trademark and I had to do it after every fight that I won."

In 2010, Rutten partnered with clothing brand, Tokyo Five, to produce and star in a cooking show titled Grandma's Kitchen with Bas Rutten. The show's pilot was scheduled to air 26 February 2010; however, due to a physical altercation between Rutten and co-hosts, production has been delayed indefinitely.

In 2018, he was inducted into the International Sports Hall of Fame.

=== Religious beliefs ===
Rutten is a practicing Catholic, talking about his faith in God on YouTube. Raised in a Catholic family, Rutten stopped practicing the faith at around 12 years old when his parents stopped attending church, but he returned to the faith in 2013. He has credited his friend Kevin James, and others, with helping him in his journey back to Catholicism.

=== Tattoos ===
Rutten has several tattoos, each of which is intended to help him spiritually and emotionally.

=== Street fights ===
Rutten is known for his brawls and bar fights around the world. In particular, in 1996 he once threw Paul Varelans through a glass window in Ukraine via a kimura lock when Varelans tried to bite his back, and immediately after he disarmed and assaulted an armed bouncer. He also participated in a brawl that took place at a bar in Sweden in which he fought several bouncers at the same time, resulting in Rutten being placed in a Swedish jail.

== Championships and accomplishments ==
=== Mixed martial arts ===
- Ultimate Fighting Championship
  - UFC Hall of Fame (Pioneer wing, Class of 2015)
  - UFC Heavyweight Championship (One time)
    - First Dutch champion in UFC history
  - UFC Encyclopedia Awards
    - Fight of the Night (One time) vs. Tsuyoshi Kohsaka
  - Undefeated in the UFC (2–0)
- Pancrase
  - King of Pancrase Openweight Championship (One time)
    - Two successful title defenses
  - Unified the King of Pancrase Openweight Championship
- Sherdog
  - Mixed Martial Arts Hall of Fame (2014 inductee)
- Fight Matrix
  - 1996 Fighter of the Year
- International Sports Hall of Fame
  - Class of 2018
- Martial Arts History Museum Hall of Fame
  - Class of 2022

== Mixed martial arts record ==
Professional record breakdown
| 33 matches | 28 wins | 4 losses |
| By knockout | 11 | 0 |
| By submission | 14 | 3 |
| By decision | 3 | 1 |
| Draws | 1 | |

| Res. | Record | Opponent | Method | Event | Date | Round | Time | Location | Notes |
|---|---|---|---|---|---|---|---|---|---|
| Win | 28–4–1 | Ruben Villareal | TKO (leg kicks) | WFA: King of the Streets | 22 July 2006 | 1 | 3:24 | Los Angeles, California, United States | |
| Win | 27–4–1 | Kevin Randleman | Decision (split) | UFC 20 | 7 May 1999 | 1 | 21:00 | Birmingham, Alabama, United States | Won the vacant UFC Heavyweight Championship. Later vacated title due to injury. |
| Win | 26–4–1 | Tsuyoshi Kohsaka | TKO (punches) | UFC 18 | 8 January 1999 | 1 | 14:15 | Kenner, Louisiana, United States | |
| Win | 25–4–1 | Kengo Watanabe | TKO (palm strikes) | Pancrase: 1998 Anniversary Show | 14 September 1998 | 1 | 2:58 | Tokyo, Japan | |
| Win | 24–4–1 | Keiichiro Yamamiya | Submission (rear-naked choke) | Pancrase: Alive 11 | 20 December 1997 | 1 | 4:58 | Yokohama, Kanagawa, Japan | |
| Win | 23–4–1 | Osami Shibuya | Submission (body crunch) | Pancrase: 1997 Anniversary Show | 6 September 1997 | 1 | 3:15 | Urayasu, Chiba, Japan | |
| Win | 22–4–1 | Takaku Fuke | Submission (armbar) | Pancrase: Alive 7 | 30 June 1997 | 1 | 4:28 | Hakata, Fukuoka, Japan | |
| Win | 21–4–1 | Kiuma Kunioku | Decision (points) | Pancrase: Alive 4 | 27 April 1997 | 1 | 15:00 | Urayasu, Chiba, Japan | |
| Draw | 20–4–1 | Osami Shibuya | Draw (majority) | Pancrase: Alive 3 | 22 March 1997 | 1 | 15:00 | Nagoya, Aichi, Japan | |
| Win | 20–4 | Manabu Yamada | Submission (ankle lock) | Pancrase: Truth 7 | 8 October 1996 | 1 | 0:54 | Nagoya, Aichi, Japan | |
| Win | 19–4 | Masakatsu Funaki | KO (knee) | Pancrase: 1996 Anniversary Show | 7 September 1996 | 1 | 17:05 | Urayasu, Chiba, Japan | Defended the Pancrase Openweight Championship. |
| Win | 18–4 | Jason DeLucia | KO (Punch to the body) | Pancrase: Truth 6 | 25 June 1996 | 1 | 8:48 | Fukuoka, Fukuoka, Japan | |
| Win | 17–4 | Frank Shamrock | TKO (doctor stoppage) | Pancrase: Truth 5 | 16 May 1996 | 1 | 11:11 | Tokyo, Japan | Defended and unified the Pancrase Openweight Championship. |
| Win | 16–4 | Katsuomi Inagaki | TKO (points) | Pancrase: Truth 4 | 8 April 1996 | 1 | 14:07 | Tokyo, Japan | |
| Win | 15–4 | Guy Mezger | Submission (ankle lock) | Pancrase: Truth 2 | 2 March 1996 | 1 | 19:36 | Kobe, Hyogo, Japan | |
| Win | 14–4 | Ryushi Yanagisawa | Submission (rear-naked choke) | Pancrase: Eyes of Beast 7 | 14 December 1995 | 1 | 27:35 | Sapporo, Hokkaido, Japan | |
| Win | 13–4 | Maurice Smith | Submission (rear-naked choke) | Pancrase: Eyes of Beast 6 | 4 November 1995 | 1 | 4:34 | Yokohama, Kanagawa, Japan | |
| Win | 12–4 | Minoru Suzuki | Submission (guillotine choke) | Pancrase: 1995 Anniversary Show | 1 September 1995 | 1 | 15:35 | Tokyo, Japan | Won the Pancrase Openweight Championship. |
| Win | 11–4 | Frank Shamrock | Decision (split) | Pancrase: 1995 Neo-Blood Tournament Second Round | 23 July 1995 | 1 | 15:00 | Tokyo, Japan | |
| Win | 10–4 | Jason DeLucia | Submission (heel hook) | Pancrase: Eyes of Beast 5 | 13 June 1995 | 1 | 1:32 | Sapporo, Hokkaido, Japan | |
| Win | 9–4 | Maurice Smith | Submission (kneebar) | Pancrase: Eyes of Beast 4 | 13 May 1995 | 1 | 2:10 | Urayasu, Chiba, Japan | |
| Win | 8–4 | Takaku Fuke | Submission (heel hook) | Pancrase: Eyes of Beast 3 | 8 April 1995 | 1 | 1:52 | Nagoya, Aichi, Japan | |
| Loss | 7–4 | Ken Shamrock | Submission (kneebar) | Pancrase: Eyes of Beast 2 | 10 March 1995 | 1 | 1:01 | Yokohama, Kanagawa, Japan | For the Pancrase Openweight Championship. |
| Win | 7–3 | Manabu Yamada | Technical Submission (arm-triangle choke) | Pancrase: Eyes of Beast 1 | 26 January 1995 | 1 | 1:05 | Nagoya, Aichi, Japan | |
| Loss | 6–3 | Frank Shamrock | Decision (majority) | King of Pancrase tournament opening round | 16 December 1994 | 1 | 10:00 | Tokyo, Japan | |
| Win | 6–2 | Jason DeLucia | Submission (guillotine choke) | Pancrase: Road to the Championship 5 | 15 October 1994 | 1 | 1:43 | Tokyo, Japan | |
| Loss | 5–2 | Ken Shamrock | Submission (rear-naked choke) | Pancrase: Road to the Championship 3 | 26 July 1994 | 1 | 16:42 | Tokyo, Japan | |
| Win | 5–1 | Minoru Suzuki | KO (knee to the body) | Pancrase: Road to the Championship 2 | 6 July 1994 | 1 | 3:43 | Amagasaki, Hyogo, Japan | |
| Win | 4–1 | Kazuo Takahashi | TKO (knee injury) | Pancrase: Road to the Championship 1 | 31 May 1994 | 1 | 1:37 | Tokyo, Japan | |
| Win | 3–1 | Vernon White | Submission (guillotine choke) | Pancrase: Pancrash! 3 | 21 April 1994 | 1 | 1:16 | Osaka, Osaka, Japan | |
| Loss | 2–1 | Masakatsu Funaki | Submission (toe hold) | Pancrase: Pancrash! 1 | 19 January 1994 | 1 | 2:58 | Yokohama, Kanagawa, Japan | |
| Win | 2–0 | Takaku Fuke | KO (knee to the body) | Pancrase: Yes, We Are Hybrid Wrestlers 2 | 14 October 1993 | 1 | 2:03 | Nagoya, Aichi, Japan | |
| Win | 1–0 | Ryushi Yanagisawa | KO (palm strike) | Pancrase: Yes, We Are Hybrid Wrestlers 1 | 21 September 1993 | 1 | 0:43 | Urayasu, Chiba, Japan | |

== Filmography ==
=== Film ===
| Year | Title | Role | Notes |
|---|---|---|---|
| 2001 | Shadow Fury | Kismet | |
| 2002 | The Smashing Machine: The Life and Times of Extreme Fighter Mark Kerr | Himself | Documentary |
| 2002 | Modern Warriors | Himself | Documentary |
| 2004 | The Eliminator | Dakota Varley | |
| 2005 | The Vault | General Matos | |
| 2005 | The Kingdom of Ultimate Power | Vlad Rifka | Short |
| 2006 | Backlash | Grazer | |
| 2009 | Paul Blart: Mall Cop | Drill Instructor | |
| 2010 | Sinners & Saints | Dekker | |
| 2011 | Zookeeper | Sebastian the Wolf (voice) | |
| 2012 | Here Comes the Boom | Niko | |
| 2014 | Mercy Rule | Coach | |
| 2015 | Paul Blart: Mall Cop 2 | Henk | |
| 2016 | The River Thief | Clyde | |
| 2025 | The Smashing Machine | Himself | |

=== Television ===
| Year | Title | Role | Notes |
|---|---|---|---|
| 1999 | Martial Law | Roman Van Reit | Episode: "Nitro Man" |
| 2000 | Freedom | The Bad Guy | Episode: "Lonewolf" |
| 2000 | The King of Queens | Emil | Episode: "Party Favors" |
| 2002 | NJPW Samurai TV | Himself | |
| 2005 | The King of Queens | Niles | Episode: "Deconstructing Carrie" |
| 2006 | International Fight League | Himself (announcer) | |
| 2007 | Fight Science | Himself | Documentary series |
| 2007 | The Modern Warrior | Himself | Documentary series |
| 2008 | Fight Science | Himself | Episode: "Fighting Back" |
| 2011 | Lights Out | Dokaj | Episode: "Bolo Punch" |
| 2012 | Punk Payback | Himself | |
| 2012 | Myrskyn Ratsastajat | Himself | Documentary |
| 2015 | Liv and Maddie | Uncle Martucci | Episode: "Ask Her More-A-Rooney" |
| 2017–18 | Kevin Can Wait | Rutger/Rootger Van De Kamp | Recurring role |

=== Video games ===
| Year | Title | Role | Notes |
|---|---|---|---|
| 1997 | WCW vs. the World | Thunder Dome | |
| 2008 | Grand Theft Auto IV | Himself (voice) / Niko Bellic (motion capture fight double) | |
| 2009 | Grand Theft Auto: The Ballad of Gay Tony | Himself (voice) | |
| 2009 | Grand Theft Auto: The Lost and Damned | Himself (voice) | |
| 2010 | EA MMA | Himself (voice) | |
| 2012 | UFC Undisputed 3 | Himself (voice) | |
| 2016 | EA Sports UFC 2 | Himself (playable character) | |

== Works ==
- Bas Rutten's Big Book of Combat, Volumes One and Two (2002)
- Bas Rutten's Big DVDs of Combat
- Bas Rutten's Lethal Street Fighting (2003)
- Bas Rutten's MMA Workout (2001)
- Bas Rutten's Superior Free Fight Techniques
- Bas Rutten's "Extreme Pancrase" No-Holds Barred Fighting System
- Training with Bas Rutten "Never Back Down Special Features" 2008
- TERA Online"MMO-FO.com Spokesman" 2012

| Preceded by Randy Couture | 4th UFC Heavyweight Champion; 7 May 1999 – 8 June 1999 | Vacant Rutten retired Title next held by Kevin Randleman |
| Preceded by Minoru Suzuki | 3rd Pancrase Openweight Champion; 1 September 1995 – October 1996 | Vacant Family reasons Title next held by Masakatsu Funaki |
