= Ryūshi Yanagisawa =

Japanese professional wrestler, kickboxer and mixed martial arts fighter

- Born: Atsushi Yanagisawa; June 22, 1972 (age 54); Aomori, Japan
- Nationality: Japanese
- Height: 6 ft 3 in (1.91 m)
- Weight: 227 lb (103 kg; 16 st 3 lb)
- Division: Heavyweight; Light Heavyweight
- Fighting out of: Yokohama, Kanagawa, Japan
- Team: Team Dragon
- Years active: 1993–2004, 2009

Kickboxing record
- Total: 9
- Wins: 2
- By knockout: 2
- Losses: 6
- By knockout: 3
- Draws: 1

Mixed martial arts record
- Total: 58
- Wins: 24
- By knockout: 4
- By submission: 15
- By decision: 5
- Losses: 25
- By knockout: 6
- By submission: 5
- By decision: 14
- Draws: 9

Other information
- Mixed martial arts record from Sherdog

Ryūshi Yanagisawa (柳澤 龍志; born June 22, 1972) is a Japanese professional wrestler, mixed martial artist and kickboxer. His real name is Atsushi Yanagisawa (柳澤 敦史). As a martial artist, he competed in K-1, Pancrase Hybrid Wrestling (Pancrase) and Fighting Network RINGS. As a professional wrestler he competed in New Japan Pro-Wrestling (NJPW) and Inoki Genome Federation (IGF).

== Mixed martial arts career ==
=== Pancrase Hybrid Wrestling ===
Yanagisawa joined Pancrase Hybrid Wrestling upon the formation of the company in 1993. He lost his first two fights to future legends Bas Rutten and Masakatsu Funaki. He then went on a four fight winning streak including a win over Vernon White but his win streak ended when he lost to another future MMA legend: Ken Shamrock. After the Shamrock fight, Yanagisawa entered Pancrase's 1995 Neo Blood Tournament where he made it to the finals before losing to Takafumi Ito. Following the loss, Yanagisawa would go winless for his next 5 fights including a draw with Guy Mezger, a loss to Frank Shamrock, and losses in rematches to Rutten and Funaki. Yanagisawa would snap his losing streak at Pancrase - Truth 3 in a victory over Larry Papadopoulos by submission but would then lose a rematch to Mezger. After that, Yanagisawa would go a three fight winning streak including victories over Vernon White by submission and a decision victory over UFC 6 tournament winner: Oleg Taktarov. After another loss to Mezger, Yanagisawa went on an 11 unbeaten streak including wins over future K-1 legend: Semmy Schilt and UFC 7 tournament runner-up: Paul Varelans before he lost once again to Mezger. On September 14, 1998, Yanaigisawa challenged Guy Mezger for the King of Pancrase Openweight Championship but lost by Decision. After one more victory, Yanagisawa would go winless for his last 9 fights in Pancrase (including a loss to future UFC Middleweight Champion: Evan Tanner) before leaving Pancrase in early 2000.

=== Fighting Network RINGS ===
In late 2000, Yanagisawa joined Fighting Network RINGS. On October 9, 2000, Yanagisawa entered RINGS' King of Kings tournament where he defeated Borislav Jeliazkov in the first round but lost to former UFC Heavyweight Champion: Randy Couture in the quarterfinals. Yanagisawa would go 1–2 in his next fights including losses to Bobby Hoffman and Fedor Emelianenko before leaving RINGS and MMA in late 2001.

=== Return to Pancrase and DEEP ===
In 2004, Yanagisawa returned to fighting at Pancrase - Brave 10 where he lost to Ryuta Noji by Decision. In 2009, Yanagisawa fought two more fights for DEEP but lost both fights.

== Professional wrestling career ==
Yanagisawa debuted in wrestling in 1992 originally competing for Pro Wrestling Fujiwawa Gumi but made no impact on the promotion. By 1993, Yanagisawa left the promotion, following Masakatsu Funaki and Minoru Suzuki to Pancrase.

Ten years after debuting in wrestling, Yanagisawa returned to the sport when he joined New Japan Pro-Wrestling. He originally debuted on August 8, 2002, under a mask as he attacked Masahiro Chono. After unmasking, he joined Tadao Yasuda's Makai Club stable which feuded with New Japan. In November 2002, Yangisawa teamed with Yasuda and Makai #1 in the Triathlon Survivor Tournament but the group finished in last place with 1 point. On December 10, 2002, Yanagisawa teamed with Yasuda to challenge Cho-Ten for the IWGP Tag Team Championship but they lost.

At Wrestling World 2003, Yanagisawa entered the Young Generation Cup tournament. He would emerge victorious, defeating Kenzo Suzuki in the semi-finals and then Yutaka Yoshie in the finals to win the cup. On February 1, 2003, Yanagisawa entered the Teisen Hall Six Man Tag Team Tournament teaming with Makai #1 and Makai #2 but the team lost in the first round to eventual winners: Hiro Saito, Tatsutoshi Goto, and Shinsuke Nakamura. A few weeks later on February 16, Yanagisawa challenged Yoshihiro Takayama for the NWF Heavyweight Championship but came up short. After the NWF Title match, Yanagisawa largely went into the midcard for the next year and a half continuing to represent the Makai Club. After the Club broke up, Yanagisawa joined Masahiro Chono's new stable: Black New Japan. He continued to remain in the midcard with his only notable moment was when he competed in the 2005 New Japan Cup but lost in the first round to Koji Kanemoto. Yanagisawa would continue to compete in New Japan until leaving January 2006. Since leaving New Japan, Yanagisawa has wrestled once for Antonio Inoki's new promotion: Inoki Genome Federation on their December 20, 2007 show losing to Chris Moore (Chris Masters).

== Championships and accomplishments ==
=== Mixed martial arts ===
- Pancrase Hybrid Wrestling
  - 1995 Neo-Blood Tournament runner-up
  - 1996 Pancrase Ranking Tournament runner-up

=== Professional wrestling ===
- New Japan Pro-Wrestling
  - Young Generation Cup (2003)

== Mixed martial arts record ==
Professional record breakdown
58 matches	24 wins	25 losses
By knockout	4	5
By submission	15	5
By decision	5	15
Draws	9	

Res.	Record	Opponent	Method	Event	Date	Round	Time	Location	Notes
Loss	24–25–9	Lee Dool-Hee	Decision (unanimous)	Deep: Fan Thanksgiving Festival 2	November 10, 2009	2	5:00	Japan	
Loss	24–24–9	Bernard Ackah	TKO (head kick & punches)	Deep: 43 Impact	August 23, 2009	1	0:07	Japan	Return to Light Heavyweight.
Loss	24–23–9	Ryuta Noji	Decision (unanimous)	Pancrase: Brave 10	November 7, 2004	3	5:00	Japan	
Loss	24–22–9	Fedor Emelianenko	Decision (unanimous)	Rings: World Title Series 4	October 20, 2001	3	5:00	Japan	2001 RINGS Absolute Class Tournament Quarterfinals
Loss	24–21–9	Bobby Hoffman	Decision (unanimous)	Rings: World Title Series 1	April 20, 2001	2	5:00	Japan	
Win	24–20–9	Wataru Sakata	Decision (split)	Rings: King of Kings 2000 Final	February 24, 2001	2	5:00	Japan	
Loss	23–20–9	Ibragim Magomedov	Decision (unanimous)	S - Samurai 2000	October 22, 2000	N/A	0:00	Japan	
Loss	23–19–9	Randy Couture	Decision (majority)	Rings: King of Kings 2000 Block A	October 9, 2000	2	5:00	Japan	King of Kings 2000 Block A Quarterfinal.
Win	23–18–9	Borislav Jeliazkov	Submission (toe hold)	Rings: King of Kings 2000 Block A	October 9, 2000	1	3:45	Japan	Return to Heavyweight; King of Kings 2000 Block A First Round.
Loss	22–18–9	Sanae Kikuta	Decision (unanimous)	Pancrase - Trans 2	February 27, 2000	1	15:00	Japan	Light Heavyweight debut.
Loss	22–17–9	Bob Stines	TKO (punches)	Pancrase - Breakthrough 10	November 28, 1999	1	1:53	Japan	
Draw	22–16–9	Akira Shoji	Draw	Pancrase - 1999 Anniversary Show	September 18, 1999	1	15:00	Japan	
Loss	22–16–8	Leon Dijk	TKO (cut)	Pancrase - 1999 Neo-Blood Tournament Second Round	August 1, 1999	1	12:48	Japan	
Draw	22–15–8	Takafumi Ito	Draw	Pancrase - Breakthrough 6	June 11, 1999	2	3:00	Japan	
Loss	22–15–7	Jason DeLucia	Decision (majority)	Pancrase - Breakthrough 5	May 23, 1999	1	15:00	Japan	
Draw	22–14–7	Manabu Yamada	Draw	Pancrase - Breakthrough 3	March 9, 1999	1	15:00	Japan	
Draw	22–14–6	Satoshi Hasegawa	Draw	Pancrase - Breakthrough 2	February 11, 1999	2	3:00	Japan	
Loss	22–14–5	Evan Tanner	Submission (arm-triangle choke)	Pancrase - Advance 12	December 19, 1998	1	2:24	Japan	
Win	22–13–5	Kosei Kubota	Submission (toe hold)	Pancrase - Advance 11	November 29, 1998	1	2:35	Japan	
Loss	21–13–5	Guy Mezger	Decision (lost points)	Pancrase - 1998 Anniversary Show	September 14, 1998	1	30:00	Japan	For the Pancrase Openweight Championship.
Draw	21–12–5	Yuki Kondo	Draw (unanimous)	Pancrase - 1998 Neo-Blood Tournament Second Round	July 26, 1998	1	20:00	Japan	
Draw	21–12–4	Keiichiro Yamamiya	Draw (majority)	Pancrase - Advance 8	June 21, 1998	2	3:00	Japan	
Win	21–12–3	Omar Bouiche	Submission (achilles lock)	Pancrase - Advance 6	May 12, 1998	1	2:35	Japan	
Win	20–12–3	Jason DeLucia	Submission (toe hold)	Pancrase - Advance 5	April 26, 1998	1	12:44	Japan	
Loss	19–12–3	Guy Mezger	Decision (unanimous)	Pancrase - Advance 4	March 18, 1998	1	20:00	Japan	
Draw	19–11–3	Keiichiro Yamamiya	Draw (unanimous)	Pancrase - Advance 2	February 6, 1998	1	10:00	Japan	
Win	19–11–2	Jason Godsey	KO (knee)	Pancrase - Advance 1	January 16, 1998	1	3:14	Japan	
Win	18–11–2	John Lober	TKO (broken ankle)	Pancrase: Alive 11	December 20, 1997	1	0:55	Japan	
Win	17–11–2	Les Johnston	Submission (banana split)	Pancrase: Alive 6	June 18, 1997	1	8:35	Japan	
Win	16–11–2	Paul Varelans	Decision (lost points)	Pancrase: Alive 4	April 27, 1997	1	15:00	Japan	
Win	15–11–2	Keiichiro Yamamiya	Decision (lost points)	Pancrase: Alive 3	March 22, 1997	1	10:00	Japan	
Win	14–11–2	Paul Lazenby	Decision (lost points)	Pancrase: Alive 2	February 22, 1997	1	12:39	Japan	
Win	13–11–2	Kim Jong-Wang	Submission (achilles lock)	Pancrase: Alive 1	January 17, 1997	1	1:47	Japan	
Win	12–11–2	Jack McGlaughlin	Submission (sugar hold)	Pancrase - Truth 10	December 15, 1996	1	0:51	Japan	
Draw	11–11–2	Takafumi Ito	Draw (unanimous)	Pancrase - Truth 8	October 22, 1996	1	10:00	Japan	
Win	11–11–1	Semmy Schilt	Submission (achilles lock)	Pancrase - Truth 7	October 8, 1996	1	0:51	Japan	
Loss	10–11–1	Guy Mezger	Decision (unanimous)	Pancrase - 1996 Anniversary Show	September 7, 1996	1	20:00	Japan	
Loss	10–10–1	Kazuo Takahashi	Decision (lost points)	Pancrase - 1996 Neo-Blood Tournament, Round 1	July 22, 1996	1	15:00	Japan	
Win	10–9–1	Takaku Fuke	Decision (lost points)	Pancrase - Truth 6	June 25, 1996	1	15:00	Japan	
Win	9–9–1	Oleg Taktarov	Decision (lost points)	Pancrase - Truth 5	May 16, 1996	1	15:00	Japan	
Loss	8–9–1	Guy Mezger	KO (palm strikes)	Pancrase - Truth 4	April 7, 1996	1	12:21	Japan	1996 Pancrase Ranking Tournament Finals
Win	8–8–1	Vernon White	Submission (achilles lock)	Pancrase - Truth 3	April 7, 1996	1	12:47	Japan	1996 Pancrase Ranking Tournament Semifinals
Win	7–8–1	Larry Papadopoulos	Submission (achilles lock)	Pancrase - Truth 3	April 7, 1996	1	3:21	Japan	1996 Pancrase Ranking Tournament First Round
Loss	6–8–1	Frank Shamrock	Decision (lost points)	Pancrase - Truth 2	March 2, 1996	1	20:00	Japan	
Loss	6–7–1	Masakatsu Funaki	Technical submission (keylock)	Pancrase - Truth 1	January 28, 1996	1	8:42	Japan	
Loss	6–6–1	Bas Rutten	Submission (rear-naked choke)	Pancrase - Eyes Of Beast 7	December 14, 1995	1	27:35	Japan	
Draw	6–5–1	Guy Mezger	Draw (unanimous)	Pancrase - Eyes Of Beast 6	November 4, 1995	1	10:00	Japan	
Loss	6–5	Jason DeLucia	Submission (triangle choke)	Pancrase - 1995 Anniversary Show	September 1, 1995	1	2:25	Japan	
Loss	6–4	Takafumi Ito	Decision (majority)	Pancrase - 1995 Neo-Blood Tournament Second Round	July 23, 1995	1	30:00	Tokyo, Japan	1995 Neo-Blood Tournament Final
Win	6–3	Gregory Smit	Submission (rear-naked choke)	Pancrase - 1995 Neo-Blood Tournament Second Round	July 23, 1995	1	7:30	Tokyo, Japan	1995 Neo-Blood Tournament Second Round
Win	5–3	Christopher DeWeaver	Submission (kimura)	Pancrase - 1995 Neo-Blood Tournament Opening Round	July 22, 1995	1	3:38	Tokyo, Japan	1995 Neo-Blood Tournament First Round
Loss	4–3	Ken Shamrock	Submission (heel hook)	Pancrase - Pancrash! 3	April 21, 1994	1	7:30	Japan	
Win	4–2	Todd Bjornethun	Submission (heel hook)	Pancrase - Pancrash! 2	March 12, 1994	1	7:12	Japan	
Win	3–2	James Mathews	Submission (armbar)	Pancrase - Pancrash! 1	January 19, 1994	1	2:58	Japan	
Win	2–2	Vernon White	TKO (lost points)	Pancrase: Yes, We Are Hybrid Wrestlers 4	December 8, 1993	1	8:55	Japan	
Win	1–2	Andre van den Oetelaar	Submission (heel hook)	Pancrase: Yes, We Are Hybrid Wrestlers 3	November 8, 1993	1	15:51	Japan	
Loss	0–2	Masakatsu Funaki	Submission (kneebar)	Pancrase: Yes, We Are Hybrid Wrestlers 2	October 14, 1993	1	1:35	Japan	
Loss	0–1	Bas Rutten	KO (palm strike)	Pancrase: Yes, We Are Hybrid Wrestlers 1	September 21, 1993	1	0:43	Tokyo, Japan	

== Kickboxing record ==
2 wins (2 KOs), 6 losses, 1 draw
Result	Opponent	Method	Event	Date	Round	Time	Location	Notes
Loss	(South Korea) Kim Young-Hyun	Decision (unanimous)	K-1 World Grand Prix 2007 in Seoul Final 16	September 29, 2007	3	3:00	Seoul, South Korea
Loss	(Germany) Chalid Arrab	TKO (doctor stoppage)	K-1 Survival 2002	June 2, 2002	3	3:00	Toyama, Japan
Loss	(Croatia) Mirko Cro Cop	TKO (doctor stoppage)	K-1 Rising 2002	January 27, 2002	1	2:44	Shizuoka, Japan
Loss	(Japan) Tatsufumi Tomihira	TKO (corner stoppage)	K-1 Survival 2001	June 24, 2001	4	3:00	Sendai, Japan
Draw	(Japan) Nobuaki Kakuda	Draw	K-1 Rising 2001	January 30, 2001	3	3:00	Matsuyama, Japan
Win	(Japan) Takashi Sonoda	TKO	Wolf Revolution Second Wave	January 12, 2001	4	3:00	Japan
Loss	(Japan) Musashi	Decision (unanimous)	K-1 Spirits 2000	July 7, 2000	3	3:00	Sendai, Japan	K-1 Spirits 2000 quarter-final bout.
Win	(United States) Edward Thurston	KO	All Japan Kickboxing Federation: Kick Over VIII	July 25, 1997	1	2:04	Japan
Loss	(Ukraine) Vitali Klitschko	Decision (unanimous)	All Japan Kickboxing Federation: Evolution Step 8	November 27, 1993	3	5:00	Japan

Legend: Win Loss Draw/no contest

== See also ==
- List of male mixed martial artists
