= Takaku Fuke =

MMA fighter/pro wrestler, part of MMA's development in Japan in early 90s

- Born: Fuke Yusuke (冨宅 裕介); January 30, 1969 (age 57); Sakai, Osaka, Japan
- Occupations: Professional wrestler, mixed martial artist
- Professional wrestling career
- Ring name(s): Momoiro Takaku, Yusuke Tomiya, Takaku Fuke
- Trained by: Yoshiaki Fujiwara
- Debut: August 13th, 1990
- Mixed martial arts career Martial arts career
- Height: 5 ft 11 in (180 cm)
- Weight: 192 lb (87 kg; 13 st 10 lb)
- Division: Light Heavyweight
- Style: Judo, Kickboxing, Shoot Wrestling
- Fighting out of: Osaka, Japan
- Team: Pancrase Inagakigumi
- Rank: Black Belt in Judo
- Years active: Pro Wrestling: 1990-1992, 2003-present MMA: 1993-2003

Mixed martial arts record
- Total: 45
- Wins: 16
- Losses: 29

Other information
- Mixed martial arts record from Sherdog

Takaku Fuke (冨宅飛駈; January 30, 1969), born Yusuke Fuke (冨宅裕介) is a Japanese professional wrestler and former mixed martial arts fighter. He was most notably involved in the early days of Pancrase, at infancy of Mixed Martial Arts in Japan. Fight Matrix ranked Takaku Fuke was #2 Heavyweight and #4 Pound-for-Pound best MMA fighter in the world in 1994.

== Background ==
Fuke was an active practitioner of judo in high school. After graduating from high school in 1989, he became a UWF trainee. There, he would train with likes of Tatsuo Nakano and Ken Shamrock. He debuted as a professional wrestler for UWF on August 13, 1990, against Masahito Kakihara. After the reborn UWF closed down in November, he would work for Pro Wrestling Fujiwara Gumi. While employed with PWFG, he was involved in a proto-MMA match with kickboxer Lawi Napataya.

== Combat sport career ==
At Pancrase 2 (October 1993), he lost to Bas Rutten via TKO, following a knee to Fuke's liver. In November 1993, Fuke lost to Ken Shamrock via submission. In December 1994, Fuke took part in the King of Pancrase tournament, where he lost against Maurice Smith in the first round. At Pancrase 19, Fuke lost to Frank Shamrock.

In June 2003, he transferred to the new section "Pancrase MISSION" in Pancrase from "Pancrase Osaka.". He became a player belonging to MISSION next to Minoru Suzuki, and in the same month, participated in "U-STYLE" for the first time.

On November 7, 2014 at WRESTLE-1/ZERO-ONE KASSEN ~ Battle ZERO1 Vs. W-1 Tournament - Day 3, he worked a match with his old Pancrase alumni, Masakatsu Funaki. In February 2019, at WRESTLE-1 Keiji Muto Produce Pro-Wrestling Masters event, Fuke took part in a 6-man tag team match, teamed up with Mitsuya Nagai and Yoshiaki Fujiwara, against Jushin Thunder Liger, Riki Choshu and Tatsumi Fujinami.

== Movie appearances ==
- Dynamite Wolf (February 16, 2019) - as himself

== Championships and accomplishments ==
- Dotonbori Pro Wrestling
  - WDW Six-Man Tag Team Championship (2 times) – 1 time with Hideaki Sumi & Yuki Tanaka, 1 time with Hideaki Sumi & Mikiya Sasaki
- Fighting Ultimate Crazy Kings
  - F*CK! World Air Class Championship (1 time)
- Japan Pro Wrestling 2000
  - J2000 Championship (2 times)
  - JWF Tag Team Championship – with Rising KID (1 time)
- Specialist Global Pro Wrestling
  - SGP Global Junior Heavyweight Championship (1 time)
- Tenryu Project
  - Tenryu Project International Junior Heavyweight Championship (1 time)

== Mixed martial arts record ==
Professional record breakdown
51 matches	16 wins	30 losses
By knockout	1	4
By submission	11	15
By decision	3	11
By disqualification	1	0
Draws	5	
No contests	0	

Res.	Record	Opponent	Method	Event	Date	Round	Time	Location	Notes
Loss	16–28–5	Yuji Hoshino	Decision (unanimous)	Pancrase 116	February 2, 2003	2	5:00	Osaka, Japan	Welterweight 77kg bout.
Loss	16–27–5	Kenichi Serizawa	Loss (triangle armbar)	Pancrase 110	August 25, 2002	2	2:41	Osaka, Japan	Light Heavyweight 90kg bout.
Draw	16–26–5	Manao Kumagai	Draw	Japan Regional	July 6, 2002	?	?	Unknown	
Loss	16–26–4	Hikaru Sato	Decision (majority)	Pancrase 106	May 11, 2002	2	5:00	Osaka, Japan	Light Middleweight 84kg bout.
Loss	16–25–4	Kenji Arai	Injury	Pancrase 104	February 17, 2002	1	3:28	Osaka, Japan	Welterweight 77kg bout
Loss	16–24–4	Ryo Chonan	Decision (unanimous)	Deep 3: Impact	December 23, 2001	3	5:00	Osaka, Japan	Open weight but presumably both were less than 90kg
Loss	16–23–4	Kazuo Misaki	TKO (punches)	Pancrase 101	December 23, 2001	1	0:08	Osaka, Japan, Japan	Middleweight 84kg
Loss	16–22–4	Minoru Suzuki	Submission (kneebar)	Pancrase 100	September 30, 2001	1	5:09	Osaka, Japan	Heavyweight 120kg
Draw	16–21–4	Daisuke Watanabe	Decision (majority)	Pancrase 83	April 30, 2000	2	3:00	Yokohama, Japan	Middleweight 84kg, All matches prior to this are heavyweight
Win	16–21–3	Minoru Suzuki	Decision (points)	Pancrase 59	June 21, 1998	2	3:00	Kobe, Japan	Heavyweight 120kg
Draw	15–21–3	Tony Rojo	Decision (majority)	Pancrase 58	June 2, 1998	2	3:00		
Loss	15–21–2	Osami Shibuya	Decision (unanimous)	Pancrase 56	April 26, 1998	2	3:00		
Draw	15–20–2	Katsuomi Inagaki	Decision (majority)	Pancrase 54	March 1, 1998	2			10:00 + OT
Loss	15–20–1	Takafumi Ito	Decision (unanimous)	Pancrase 53	February 6, 1998	1	5:52		
Loss	15–19–1	Satoshi Hasegawa	Decision (points)	Pancrase 50	November 16, 1997	2			
Loss	15–18–1	Takafumi Ito	Submission (armbar)	Pancrase 48	September 9, 1997	1	5:52		10:00 x 1 round
Win	15–17–1	Kosei Kubota	Submission (guillotine choke)	Pancrase 47	August 9, 1997	1	3:22		
Loss	14–17–1	Bas Rutten	Submission (armbar)	Pancrase 44	June 30, 1997	1	4:28		
Loss	14–16–1	Semmy Schilt	Submission (rear-naked choke)	Pancrase 42	April 24, 1997	1	8:59		
Win	14–15–1	Paul Lazenby	Submission (ankle lock)	Pancrase 41	April 27, 1997	1	7:45		
Win	13–15–1	Haygar Chin	Submission (3:46)	Pancrase 39	February 22, 1997	1	3:46		
Loss	12–15–1	Osami Shibuya	Decision (points)	Pancrase 38	January 17, 1997	1	15		
Win	12–14–1	Jong Wang Kim	Submission (rear-naked choke)	Pancrase 37	December 15, 1996	1	2:09		
Loss	11–14–1	Ryushi Yanagisawa	Decision (points)	Pancrase 30	June 25, 1996	1	15:00		
Draw	11–13–1	Vernon White	Draw (unanimous)	Pancrase 29	May 16, 1996	1	10:00		
Loss	11–13	Guy Mezger	Decision (unanimous)	Pancrase - Truth 3	April 7, 1996	1	10:00		
Loss	11–12	Minoru Suzuki	Submission (armbar)	Pancrase 26: Truth 2	March 2, 1996	1	4:15	Kobe, Japan	20:00 x 1 round
Win	11–11	Leon Van Dijk	Decision (points)	Pancrase 25	January 28, 1996	1	10:00		
Loss	10–11	Masakatsu Funaki	Submission (rear-naked choke)	Pancrase 24	December 14, 1995	1	0:31		
Loss	10–10	Jason DeLucia	Decision (points)	Pancrase 23	November 4, 1995	1	30:00		
Win	10–9	Todd Medina	Submission (armbar)	Pancrase 22	September 1, 1995	1	5:30		
Loss	9–9	Frank Shamrock	Submission (rear-naked choke)	Pancrase 19	June 13, 1995	1	8:16		
Win	9–8	Gregory Smit	Decision (points)	Pancrase 18	May 13, 1995	1	20:00		
Loss	8–8	Bas Rutten	Submission (heel hook)	Pancrase 17	April 8, 1995	1	1:52		
Loss	8–7	Larry Papadopoulos	Decision (unanimous)	Pancrase 16	March 10, 1995	1	15:00		
Win	8–6	Richard Saar	TKO (spinning backfist)	Pancrase 15	January 26, 1995	1	0:23		Perhaps the first spinning back fist TKO in MMA history
Loss	7–6	Maurice Smith	TKO (knee)	Pancrase 13	December 16, 1994	1	2:48		10 min + OT
Loss	7–5	Ken Shamrock	Submission (rear-naked choke)	Pancrase 12	October 15, 1994	1	3:13		
Win	7–4	Manabu Yamada	Submission (heel hook)	Pancrase 11	September 1, 1994	1	13:47		15:00 x 1 round
Win	6–4	Jason Delucia	Submission (heel hook)	Pancrase 10	July 26, 1994	1	4:00	Tokyo, Japan	15:00 x 1 round
Win	5–4	Gregory Smit	Submission (ankle lock)	Pancrase 9	July 6, 1994	1	3:46		Final scheduled "30:00 x 1" match of his career
Win	4–4	Toon Stelling	Disqualification (Illegal soccer kick)	Pancrase 8	May 31, 1994	1	4:37		
Loss	3–4	Masakatsu Funaki	Submission (rear-naked choke)	Pancrase 7	April 21, 1994	1	6:55		
Loss	3–3	Minoru Suzuki	Submission (rear-naked choke)	Pancrase 6: Pancrash! 2	March 12, 1994	1	6:31	Aichi, Japan	
Win	3–2	Scott Bessac	Submission (heel hook)	Pancrase 5: Pancrash! 1	January 19, 1994	1	3:04		
Win	2–2	Katsuomi Inagaki	Submission (rear-naked choke)	Pancrase 4	December 8, 1993	1	6:18	Hakata, Japan	
Loss	1–2	Ken Shamrock	Submission (rear-naked choke)	Pancrase 3	November 8, 1993	1	0:44	Kobe, Japan	
Loss	1–1	Bas Rutten	TKO (knee to the body)	Pancrase 2	October 14, 1993	1	2:03	Nagoya, Japan	
Win	1–0	Vernon White	Submission (armbar)	Pancrase 1	September 21, 1993	1	1:19	Tokyo, Japan	Inaugural Pancrase event
