= List of Pancrase champions =

This is a list of Pancrase champions at each weight class. Pancrase is a Japan-based mixed martial arts (MMA) promoting and sanctioning organization founded in 1993. The champions of Pancrase are referred to by the title of "King of Pancrase" and "Queen of Pancrase".

== Current champions ==
=== Men ===
Division	Champion	Since	Defenses
Heavyweight	Vacant	January 2008	—
Light Heavyweight	Vacant	May 2011	—
Middleweight	(Tajikistan) Qosim Sardorov	December 21, 2025	1
Welterweight	(Brazil) Goiti Yamauchi	December 21, 2025	0
Lightweight	(Brazil) Rafael Barbosa	March 14, 2026	0
Featherweight	(Japan) Yuito Yanagawa	December 21, 2025	0
Featherweight	(Tajikistan) Otabek Rajabov; Interim champion	June 28, 2026	0
Bantamweight	(Japan) Ryo Tajima	December 21, 2025	0
Bantamweight	(Japan) Nahoru Miyagi; Interim champion	May 31, 2026	0
Flyweight	(Japan) Ryusei Tokida	May 31, 2026	0
Strawweight	(Japan) Yuta Miyazawa	March 14, 2026	0

=== Women ===
Division	Champion	Since	Defenses
Bantamweight	Vacant	February 9, 2017	0
Flyweight	(Japan) Shizuka Sugiyama	March 14, 2026	0
Strawweight	(Japan) Miki Motono	December 21, 2025	0
Atomweight	(Japan) Satomi Takano	March 31, 2024	0

== Men's championship history ==
=== Heavyweight Championship ===
Weight limit: 120 kg (264.6 lb)
On January 30, 2008 Pancrase revised this weight class limit from 105 kg (231.5 lb) to its current limits.

No.	Name	Event	Date	Defenses
1	(Japan) Yoshiki Takahashi def. Shamoji Fujii	Pancrase Proof 7 Kanagawa, Japan	Dec 1, 2001	1. def. Tsuyoshi Ozawa at Pancrase 2003 Neo-Blood tournament opening round on July 27, 2003 in Tokyo, Japan
Takahashi vacated the Heavyweight title.
2	(Lithuania) Kestutis Arbocius def. Poai Suganuma	Pancrase Blow 6 Kanagawa, Japan	Aug 27, 2006	
Arbocius was stripped of Heavyweight title in May 2007 due to injury.
3	(Brazil) Assuério Silva def. Tatsuya Mizuno	Pancrase Rising 5 Tokyo, Japan	May 30, 2007	
Assuério Silva vacated the title in January 2008 when he left the organization.

=== Light Heavyweight Championship ===
Weight limit: 93 kg (205.0 lb)
Formerly known as Cruiserweight until 2008
On January 30, 2008 Pancrase revised this weight class limit from 95 kg (209.4 lb) to its current limits.

No.	Name	Event	Date	Defenses
1	(Japan) Keiichiro Yamamiya def. Ikuhisa Minowa	Pancrase 2000 Anniversary Show; Kanagawa, Japan	Sep 24, 2000	
Title Vacated.
2	(Japan) Sanae Kikuta def. Ikuhisa Minowa	Pancrase 2001 Anniversary Show; Kanagawa, Japan	Sep 30, 2001	1. drew with Yuki Kondo at Pancrase Hybrid 5 on May 18, 2003 in Kanagawa, Japan
3	(Japan) Yuki Kondo	Pancrase Hybrid 10; Tokyo, Japan	Nov 30, 2003	1. def. Daijiro Matsui at Pancrase Blow 6 on Aug 27, 2006 in Kanagawa, Japan
Yuki Kondo vacated the title in January 2008 to move down to middleweight.
4	(Japan) Ryo Kawamura def. Keiichiro Yamamiya	Pancrase Shining 8 Tokyo, Japan	Oct 1, 2008	1. def. Yukiya Naito at Pancrase: Changing Tour 3 on Jun 7, 2009 in Tokyo, Japan; 2. def. Shunsuke Inoue at Pancrase: Changing Tour 8 on Dec 6, 2009 in Tokyo, Japan; 3. drew with Yuji Sakuragi at Pancrase Passion Tour 11 on Dec 5, 2010 in Tokyo, Japan
Ryo Kawamura vacated the title in May 2011 to move down to middleweight.

=== Middleweight Championship ===
Weight limit: 84 kg (185.2 lb)
On January 30, 2008 Pancrase revised this weight class limit from 85 kg (187.4 lb) to its current limits.

No.	Name	Event	Date	Defenses
1	(United States) Nathan Marquardt def. Shonie Carter	Pancrase 2000 Anniversary Show; Kanagawa, Japan	Sep 24, 2000	1. drew with Kiuma Kunioku at Pancrase Trans 7 on Dec 4, 2000 in Japan; 2. def. Yuji Hoshino at Pancrase Proof 6 on Oct 30, 2001 in Tokyo, Japan
2	(Japan) Kiuma Kunioku	Pancrase Proof 7 Kanagawa, Japan	Dec 1, 2001	
3	(United States) Nathan Marquardt (2)	Pancrase Spirit 9 Tokyo, Japan	Dec 21, 2002	1. def. Izuru Takeuchi at Pancrase Hybrid 3 on Mar 8, 2003 in Tokyo, Japan
4	(United States) Ricardo Almeida	Pancrase Hybrid 10; Tokyo, Japan	Nov 30, 2003	
Almeida vacated the title in July 2004 when he retired from active competition.
5	(United States) Nathan Marquardt (3) def. Kazuo Misaki	Pancrase Brave 10; Chiba, Japan	Nov 7, 2004	1. def. Izuru Takeuchi at Pancrase Spiral 4 on May 1, 2005 in Kanagawa, Japan
Marquardt vacated the title in October 2006 when he left Pancrase for the UFC.
6	(Japan) Yuichi Nakanishi def. Izuru Takeuchi	Pancrase Blow 10; Tokyo, Japan	Dec 2, 2006	
7	(Japan) Izuru Takeuchi	Pancrase Rising 9 Tokyo, Japan	Nov 28, 2007	1. drew with Takenori Sato at Pancrase: Changing Tour 4 on August 8, 2009 in Tokyo, Japan
8	(Japan) Ichiro Kanai	Pancrase: Changing Tour 8 Tokyo, Japan	Dec 6, 2009	
—	(Japan) Yuki Kondo promoted to interim champion after vacating the Light Heavyweight title	—	Jan 2008	1. def. Ki Bum Kim at Pancrase: Changing Tour 4 on Aug 8, 2009 in Tokyo, Japan; 2. drew with Yuji Hisamatsu at Pancrase: Changing Tour 6 on Oct 25, 2009 in Tokyo, Japan; 3. def. Takenori Sato at Pancrase Passion Tour 1 on Feb 7, 2010 in Tokyo, Japan
9	(Japan) Yuki Kondo def. Ichiro Kanai for undisputed title	Pancrase Passion Tour 4 Tokyo, Japan	Apr 29, 2010	1. drew with Yuji Hisamatsu at Pancrase Passion Tour 6 on Jul 4, 2010 in Tokyo, Japan
10	(Japan) Rikuhei Fujii	Pancrase: Passion Tour 11; Tokyo, Japan	Dec 5, 2010	
Rikuhei Fujii vacated the title in May 2011.
11	(Japan) Ryo Kawamura def. Ikkei Nagamura	Pancrase Progress Tour 1 Tokyo, Japan	Jan 28, 2012	1. def. Shungo Oyama at Pancrase Progress Tour 7 on Jun 2, 2012 in Tokyo, Japan
12	(Japan) Shinsho Anzai	Pancrase 259; Tokyo, Japan	June 29, 2014	
Shinsho Anzai vacated the title when he signed with the UFC.
13	(Japan) Ryo Kawamura (2) def. Yuki Niimura	Pancrase 281; Tokyo, Japan	Oct 2, 2016	
14	(Japan) Yuki Niimura	Pancrase 291; Tokyo, Japan	Nov 12, 2017	
Niimura vacated the title when he signed with ONE Championship.
15	(Japan) Yura Naito def. Ryo Kawamura	Pancrase 326; Tokyo, Japan	Mar 21, 2022	
16	(Tajikistan) Qosim Sardorov def. Ryutaro Sato	Pancrase 360; Tokyo, Japan	December 21, 2025	1. def. Genpei Hayashi at Pancrase 365 on Sep 6, 2026 in Tokyo, Japan

=== Welterweight Championship ===
Weight limit: 77 kg (169.8 lb)
Formerly known as Lightweight until 2006
On January 30, 2008 Pancrase revised this weight limit from 75 kg (165.3 lb) to its current limits.

No.	Name	Event	Date	Defenses
1	(Japan) Kiuma Kunioku def. Takafumi Ito	Pancrase 2002 Neo-Blood tournament second round Tokyo, Japan	Jul 28, 2002	1. def. Hiroki Nagaoka at Pancrase 2002 Anniversary Show on Sep 29, 2002 in Kanagawa, Japan; 2. def. Kenichi Serizawa at Pancrase Hybrid 10 on Nov 30, 2003 in Tokyo, Japan
Kunioku vacated the title in September 2004 when he left the organization.
—	(Japan) Katsuya Inoue promoted to interim champion when opponent withdrew due to injury	—	?	1. def. Kenji Arai at Pancrase Spiral 4 on May 1, 2005 in Kanagawa, Japan; 2. drew with Satoru Kitaoka at Pancrase - Blow 1 on Jan 26, 2006 in Tokyo, Japan
2	(Japan) Daizo Ishige def. Katsuya Inoue for undisputed title	Pancrase Blow 6 Kanagawa, Japan	Aug 27, 2006	
—	(Japan) Katsuya Inoue def. Fabricio Nascimento for interim title	Pancrase 2007 Neo-Blood Tournament Finals; Tokyo, Japan	Jul 27, 2007	
Daizo Ishige vacated the title in January 2008.
3	(Japan) Katsuya Inoue def. Satoru Kitaoka for undisputed title	Pancrase Shining 1 Tokyo, Japan	Jan 30, 2008	
Katsuya Inoue vacated the title in February 2008 in order to compete at Lightweight.
—	(Japan) Takuya Wada def. Jason Palacios for interim title	Pancrase Shining 3 Tokyo, Japan	Apr 27, 2008	
4	(Japan) Takuya Wada promoted to undisputed champion	—	—	1. def. Tomoyoshi Iwamiya at Pancrase: Changing Tour 2 on Apr 5, 2009 in Tokyo, Japan
Takuya Wada vacated the title on April 30, 2010.
5	(Japan) Kengo Ura def. Keiichiro Yamamiya	Pancrase Passion Tour 5 Tokyo, Japan	Jun 5, 2010	
6	(Japan) Takenori Sato	Pancrase Impressive Tour 1 Tokyo, Japan	Feb 6, 2011	1. def. Sojiro Orui at Pancrase Impressive Tour 5 on Jun 5, 2011 in Tokyo, Japan; 2. drew with Eiji Ishikawa at Pancrase Impressive Tour 10 on Oct 2, 2012 in Tokyo, Japan; 3. def. Kiichi Kunimoto at Pancrase Progress Tour 3 on Mar 11, 2012 in Tokyo, Japan; 4. def. Keiichiro Yamamiya at Pancrase Progress Tour 10 on Sep 1, 2012 in Tokyo, Japan; 5. drew with Akihiro Murayama at Pancrase 246 on Mar 17, 2013 in Tokyo, Japan; 6. def. Shingo Suzuki at Pancrase 247 on May 19, 2013 in Tokyo, Japan
Takenori Sato vacated the title when he signed with the UFC.
7	(Japan) Gota Yamashita def. Akihiro Murayama	Pancrase 260; Tokyo, Japan	August 10, 2014	1. def. Yuki Kondo at Pancrase 263 on Dec 6, 2014 in Tokyo, Japan
8	(Japan) Shingo Suzuki	Pancrase 270; Tokyo, Japan	October 4, 2015	
9	(Japan) Akihiro Murayama	Pancrase 276; Tokyo, Japan	March 13, 2016	
10	(Japan) Hiromitsu Miura	Pancrase 281; Tokyo, Japan	October 2, 2016	
11	(Japan) Daichi Abe	Pancrase 288; Tokyo, Japan	July 2, 2017	
Daichi Abe vacated the title when he signed with the UFC.
12	(Brazil) Glaico França def. Takashi Sato	Pancrase 297; Tokyo, Japan	July 1, 2018	
Glaico França vacated the title when he signed with the PFL.
—	(Japan) Hiroyuki Tetsuka def. Kenta Takagi for interim title	Pancrase 306; Tokyo, Japan	June 30, 2019	
13	(Japan) Hiroyuki Tetsuka promoted to undisputed champion	—	—	
Hiroyuki Tetsuka vacated the title when he signed with the ONE Championship.
—	(Japan) Masayuki Kikuiri def. Akihiro Murayama for interim title	Pancrase 324; Tokyo, Japan	October 16, 2021	
14	(Japan) Masayuki Kikuiri promoted to undisputed champion	—	May 26, 2022	
Kikuiri vacated the title when he signed with Bellator.
15	(Japan) Genpei Hayashi def. Akihiro Murayama	Pancrase 334; Tokyo, Japan	June 4, 2023	
16	(Japan) Ryuichiro Sumimura	Pancrase 340; Yokohama, Japan	December 24, 2023	
17	(Japan) Shogo Sato def. Osu Man	Pancrase 353; Tokyo, Japan	April 27, 2025	
18	(Brazil) Goiti Yamauchi def. Shogo Sato	Pancrase 360; Tokyo, Japan	December 21, 2025	

=== Lightweight Championship ===
Weight limit: 70 kg (154.3 lb)

No.	Name	Event	Date	Defenses
1	(Japan) Shoji Maruyama def. Artur Oumakhanov	Pancrase Shining 1 Tokyo, Japan	Jan 30, 2008	
Shoji Maruyama vacated the title in May 2008 to compete at Featherweight.
2	(Japan) Katsuya Inoue def. Koji Oishi	Pancrase Shining 10; Tokyo, Japan	Dec 7, 2008	1. def. Daisuke Hanazawa at Pancrase: Changing Tour 1 on Feb 1, 2009 in Tokyo, Japan
3	(Venezuela) Maximo Blanco	Pancrase: Changing Tour 4 Tokyo, Japan	Aug 8, 2009	
Maximo Blanco vacated the title in April 2011 citing an inability to defend his belt due to numerous injuries.
4	(Japan) Koji Oishi def. Daisuke Hanazawa	Pancrase Impressive Tour 4 Tokyo, Japan	May 3, 2011	
5	(Japan) Isao Kobayashi	Pancrase Progress Tour 4 Tokyo, Japan	Apr 1, 2012	1. def. Yoshiaki Takahashi at Pancrase 252 - 20th Anniversary on Sep 29, 2013 in Yokohama, Japan
Isao Kobayashi vacated the title in 2014.
6	(Japan) Kazuki Tokudome def. Satoru Kitaoka	Pancrase 271; Tokyo, Japan	November 1, 2015	1. def. Akbarh Arreola at Pancrase 277 on Apr 23, 2016 in Tokyo, Japan
7	(Japan) Takasuke Kume	Pancrase 280; Tokyo, Japan	September 11, 2016	1. def. Kazuki Tokudome at Pancrase 292 on Dec 10, 2017 in Tokyo, Japan; 2. def. Tom Santos at Pancrase 304 on Apr 14, 2019 in Tokyo, Japan; 3. def. Tatsuya Saika at Pancrase 325 on Dec 11, 2021 in Tokyo, Japan
—	(Tajikistan) Salimkhan Sadulloev def. Yusuke Kasuya for interim title	Pancrase 308; Tokyo, Japan	September 29, 2019	
—	(Japan) Tatsuya Saika def. Genpei Hayashi for interim title	Pancrase 318; Tokyo, Japan	September 27, 2020	
—	(Japan) Akira Okada def. Koshi Matsumoto for interim title	Pancrase 329; Tokyo, Japan	September 11, 2022	
8	(Japan) Akira Okada	Pancrase 333; Tokyo, Japan	April 30, 2023	
9	(Japan) Tatsuya Saika	Pancrase 341; Tokyo, Japan	March 31, 2024	
10	(Brazil) Rafael Barbosa def. Tatsuya Saika	Pancrase 361; Yokohama, Japan	March 14, 2026	

=== Featherweight Championship ===
Weight limit: 66 kg (145.5 lb)
Formerly known as Lightweight until 2008
On January 30, 2008 Pancrase revised this weight limit from 65 kg (143.3 lb) to its current limits.

No.	Name	Event	Date	Defenses
1	(Japan) Yoshiro Maeda def. Daiki "D.J.Taiki" Hata	Pancrase Blow 6 Yokohama, Japan	Aug 27, 2006	1. def. Danny Batten at Pancrase Rising 4 on Apr 27, 2007 in Tokyo, Japan
Yoshiro Maeda vacated the title when he left Pancrase for the WEC.
2	(Brazil) Marlon Sandro def. Masaya Takita	Pancrase: Shining 9 Tokyo, Japan	Oct 26, 2008	
—	(Japan) Takumi Nakayama def. Tomonari Kanomata for interim title	Pancrase Impressive Tour 9 Tokyo, Japan	Sep 4, 2011	1. def. Jon Shores at Pancrase Progress Tour 7 on Jun 2, 2012 in Tokyo, Japan
Sandro was stripped of title for refusing to attend the title defense.
3	(Japan) Takumi Nakayama; Promoted to undisputed champion.	—	August 9, 2012	
4	(United States) Nam Phan	Pancrase 264; Tokyo, Japan	January 31, 2015	
5	(United States) Andy Main	Pancrase 270; Tokyo, Japan	October 4, 2015	
6	(Japan) Issei Tamura def. Juntaro Ushiku for interim title	Pancrase 277; Tokyo, Japan	Apr 24, 2016	
7	(Argentina) Nazareno Malegarie def. Issei Tamura	Pancrase 285; Tokyo, Japan	Mar 12, 2017	
—	(Japan) Isao Kobayashi def. Koyomi Matsushima for interim title	Pancrase 295; Tokyo, Japan	Apr 15, 2018	
Title Unification.
8	(Japan) Isao Kobayashi def. Nazareno Malegarie for undisputed title	Pancrase 305; Tokyo, Japan	May 26, 2019	1. def. Kyle Aguon at Pancrase 309 on Oct 20, 2019 in Tokyo, Japan; 2. def. Taichi Nakajima at Pancrase 321 on May 30, 2021 in Tokyo, Japan
Kobayashi vacated the title when he signed with Bellator.
—	(Japan) Tokitaka Nakanishi def. Shinsuke Kamei for interim title	Pancrase 328; Tokyo, Japan	July 18, 2022	
9	(Japan) Tokitaka Nakanishi promoted to undisputed champion	—	—	
Nakanishi vacated the title when he chose to compete at bantamweight.
10	(Japan) Suguru Nii def. Shinsuke Kamei	Pancrase 337; Tokyo, Japan	September 24, 2023	
11	(Japan) Kisa Miyake def. Naoki Hirata	Pancrase 351; Tokyo, Japan	December 15, 2024	1. def. Hirotaka Nakada at Pancrase 354 on June 1, 2025 in Tokyo, Japan
Miyake vacated the title in 2025.
12	(Japan) Yuito Yanagawa def. Kalybek Arzykul Uulu	Pancrase 360; Tokyo, Japan	December 21, 2025	
—	(Tajikistan) Otabek Rajabov def. Shosuke Kinoshita for interim title	Pancrase 363; Tokyo, Japan	June 28, 2026	

=== Bantamweight Championship ===
Weight limit: 61 kg (134.5 lb)
In 2016 Pancrase revised this weight limit from 62 kg (136.7 lb) to its current limits.

No.	Name	Event	Date	Defenses
1	(Japan) Manabu Inoue def. Seiya Kawahara	Pancrase Shining 10; Yokohama, Japan	Dec 7, 2008	1. def. Masahiro Oishi at Pancrase: Changing Tour 6 on Oct 25, 2009 in Tokyo, Japan; 2. def. Tashiro Nishiuichi at Pancrase Passion Tour 8 on Sep 5, 2010 in Tokyo, Japan
2	(Japan) Shintaro Ishiwatari	Pancrase Impressive Tour 13; Tokyo, Japan	Dec 3, 2011	1. def. Tashiro Nishiuchi at Pancrase Progress Tour 3 on March 11, 2012 in Tokyo, Japan; 2. def. Yo Saito at Pancrase 256 on Feb 2, 2014 in Tokyo, Japan; 3. def. Trevor Ward at Pancrase 258 on May 11, 2014 in Tokyo, Japan; 4. def. Victor Henry at Pancrase 273 on Dec 13, 2015 in Tokyo, Japan; 5. def. Jonathan Brookins at Pancrase 279 on July 24, 2016 in Tokyo, Japan; 6. def. Rafael Silva at Pancrase 287 on May 28, 2017 in Tokyo, Japan
Ishiwatari was stripped of the title when he left Pancrase for Rizin.
—	(Brazil) Rafael Silva def. Masakatsu Ueda for interim title	Pancrase 296; Tokyo, Japan	May 20, 2018	
3	(Brazil) Rafael Silva promoted to undisputed champion	—	—	1. def. Kenta Takizawa at Pancrase 303 on March 17, 2019 in Tokyo, Japan; 2. def. Yuto Hokamura at Pancrase 307 on July 21, 2019 in Tokyo, Japan
Silva retired on October 7, 2022. Nakajima was promoted to full champion status.
—	(Japan) Taichi Nakajima def. Rui Imura for interim title	Pancrase 325; Tokyo, Japan	Dec 11, 2021	
4	(Japan) Taichi Nakajima promoted to undisputed champion	—	Oct 7, 2022	1. def. interim champion Ryo Tajima at Pancrase 333 on April 30, 2023 in Tokyo, Japan
—	(Japan) Ryo Tajima def. Toshinori Tsunemura for interim title	Pancrase 330; Yokohama, Japan	Dec 25, 2022	
Nakajima vacated the title on November 16, 2023..
5	(Japan) Tokitaka Nakanishi def. Yasuhiro Kawamura	Pancrase 340; Yokohama, Japan	December 24, 2023	
6	(Japan) Ryo Tajima def. Rui Imura	Pancrase 360; Tokyo, Japan	December 21, 2025	
—	(Japan) Nahoru Miyagi def. Reo Yamaguchi for interim title	Pancrase 362; Tokyo, Japan	May 31, 2026	

=== Flyweight Championship ===
Weight limit: 57 kg (125.7 lb)
In 2016 Pancrase revised this weight limit from 58 kg (127.9 lb) to its current limits.

No.	Name	Event	Date	Defenses
1	(Japan) Mitsuhisa Sunabe def. Takuya Eizumi	Pancrase: Changing Tour 3 Tokyo, Japan	Jun 7, 2009	1. def. Isao Hirose at Pancrase: Changing Tour 6 on Oct 25, 2009 in Tokyo, Japan
2	(Japan) Kiyotaka Shimizu	Pancrase Passion Tour 1 Tokyo, Japan	Feb 7, 2010	1. def. Isao Hirose at Pancrase Passion Tour 6 on Jul 4, 2010 in Tokyo, Japan; 2. drew with Mitsuhisa Sunabe at Pancrase Passion Tour 11 on Dec 5, 2010 in Tokyo, Japan; 3. def. Mitsuhisa Sunabe at Pancrase Impressive Tour 5 on Jun 5, 2011 in Tokyo, Japan; 4. drew with Seiji Ozuka at Pancrase Progress Tour 1 on Jan 28, 2012 in Tokyo, Japan; 5. def. Yuki Yasunaga at Pancrase Progress Tour 14 on Dec 1, 2012 in Tokyo, Japan; 6. def. Atshushi Yamamoto at Pancrase 257 on March 30, 2014 in Yokohama, Japan
Shimizu was stripped of the title after losing to Ryuichi Miki in "champion's assessment bout" in Dec 2015.
3	(Japan) Ryuichi Miki def. Yuki Yasunaga	Pancrase 279; Tokyo, Japan	July 24, 2016	
4	(Japan) Mamoru Yamaguchi	Pancrase 285; Tokyo, Japan	Mar 12, 2017	
5	(Japan) Senzo Ikeda	Pancrase 289; Tokyo, Japan	Aug 20, 2017	1. def. Yuya Wakamatsu at Pancrase 293 on Feb. 4, 2018 in Tokyo, Japan
—	(Japan) Shohei Masumizu def. Masatatsu Ueda for interim title	Pancrase 307; Tokyo, Japan	Jul 21, 2019	
—	(Japan) Toru Ogawa def. Masatatsu Ueda for interim title	Pancrase 324; Tokyo, Japan	Oct 16, 2021	
Ikeda vacated the title on January 24, 2022, in order to compete with ONE Championship.
6	(Japan) Toru Ogawa promoted to undisputed champion	—	—	
7	(Japan) Satoru Enomoto	Pancrase 326; Tokyo, Japan	March 21, 2022	
8	(Japan) Rei Tsuruya	Pancrase 330; Yokohama, Japan	December 25, 2022	
—	(Japan) Seiichiro Ito def. Naoki Arikawa for interim title	Pancrase 340; Yokohama, Japan	December 24, 2023	
Tsuruya vacated the title on April 3, 2024.
9	(Japan) Seiichiro Ito promoted to undisputed champion	—	April 3, 2024	1. def. Muhammad Salohidinov at Pancrase 346 on July 21, 2024 in Tokyo, Japan
10	(Japan) Takumi Hamada def. Tomoki Otsuka	Pancrase 358; Tokyo, Japan	November 9, 2025	
11	(Japan) Ryusei Tokida def. Hiroto Kishida	Pancrase 362; Tokyo, Japan	May 31, 2026	

=== Strawweight Championship ===
Weight limit: 52 kg (114.6 lb)
In 2016 Pancrase revised this weight limit from 52 kg (114.6 lb) to its current limits.

No.	Name	Event	Date	Defenses
1	(Japan) Mitsuhisa Sunabe	Pancrase 271; Tokyo, Japan	Nov. 1, 2015	1. def. Daichi Kitakata at Pancrase 283 on Dec 18, 2016 in Tokyo, Japan; 2. def. Shinya Murofushi at Pancrase 295 on Apr 15, 2018 in Tokyo, Japan
2	(Japan) Daichi Kitakata	Pancrase 307; Tokyo, Japan	July 21, 2019	1. def. Yuta Miyazawa at Pancrase 325 on Dec. 12, 2021 in Tokyo, Japan
3	(Japan) Keito Yamakita	Pancrase 328; Tokyo, Japan	July 18, 2022	
—	(Japan) Ryohei Kurosawa def. Little for interim title	Pancrase 342; Tokyo, Japan	April 29, 2024	
4	(Japan) Ryohei Kurosawa promoted to undisputed champion	—	—	
5	(Japan) Yuta Miyazawa def. Denchi Funada	Pancrase 361; Yokohama, Japan	March 14, 2026	

== Women's championship history ==
=== Women's Bantamweight Championship ===
Weight limit: 61 kg (134.5 lb)
In 2016 Pancrase revised this weight limit from 62 kg (136.7 lb) to its current limits.

No.	Name	Event	Date	Defenses
1	(Japan) Rin Nakai def. Danielle West	Pancrase Progress Tour 14; Tokyo, Japan	Dec 1, 2012	1. def. Brenda Gonzales at Pancrase 247 on May 10, 2013 in Tokyo, Japan; 2. def. Tara LaRosa at Pancrase 252 on Sep 29, 2013 in Kanagawa, Japan; 3. def. Sarah D'Alelio at Pancrase 258 on May 11, 2014 in Tokyo, Japan; 4. def. Emiko Raika at Pancrase 279 on Jul 24, 2016 in Tokyo, Japan; 5. def. Charlene Watt-Broome at Pancrase 282 on Nov 13, 2016 in Tokyo, Japan
Nakai vacated the title in 2018 when she left Pancrase for the DEEP.

=== Women's Flyweight Championship ===
Weight limit: 57 kg (125.7 lb)
In 2016 Pancrase revised this weight limit from 58 kg (127.9 lb) to its current limits.

No.	Name	Event	Date	Defenses
1	(Brazil) Sidy Rocha def. Takayo Hashi	Pancrase 304; Tokyo, Japan	Apr 14, 2019	
—	(Japan) Takayo Hashi def. Nori Date for interim title	Pancrase 324; Tokyo, Japan	October 16, 2021	
2	(Japan) Takayo Hashi promoted to undisputed champion	—	March 30, 2023	1. def. Nori Date at Pancrase 333 on April 30, 2023 in Tokyo, Japan
3	(Japan) Honoka Shigeta	Pancrase 341; Tokyo, Japan	March 31, 2024	
4	(Japan) Shizuka Sugiyama	Pancrase 346; Tokyo, Japan	July 21, 2024	
5	(Japan) Fumika Watanabe	Pancrase 352; Yokohama, Japan	March 9, 2025	
6	(Japan) Shizuka Sugiyama def. Ayane Wada	Pancrase 361; Yokohama, Japan	March 14, 2026	

=== Women's Strawweight Championship ===
Weight limit: 52 kg (114.6 lb)

No.	Name	Event	Date	Defenses
1	(Japan) Syuri Kondo def. Kinberly Tanaka Novaes	Pancrase 287; Tokyo, Japan	May 28, 2017	
Kondo vacated the title in September 2017 when she left Pancrase for the UFC.
2	(Brazil) Viviane Araujo def. Emi Fujino	Pancrase 298; Tokyo, Japan	Aug. 5, 2018	
Araujo vacated the title in 2019 when she signed with the UFC.
3	(Japan) Emi Fujino def. Hyun Ji Jang	Pancrase 311; Tokyo, Japan	December 8, 2019	
4	(Japan) Karen	Pancrase 326; Tokyo, Japan	March 21, 2022	
5	(Japan) Haruka Hasegawa	Pancrase 333; Tokyo, Japan	April 30, 2023	
Haruka Hasegawa vacated the title in 2025 due to injury.
6	(Japan) Miki Motono def. KAREN	Pancrase 360; Tokyo, Japan	December 21, 2025	

=== Women's Atomweight Championship ===
Weight limit: 47.6 kg (104.9 lb)

No.	Name	Event	Date	Defenses
1	(Japan) Satomi Takano def. Sayako Fujita	Pancrase 341; Tokyo, Japan	March 31, 2024	

== Defunct titles ==
=== Openweight Championship ===
No weight restrictions

No.	Name	Event	Date	Defenses
1	(United States) Ken Shamrock def. Manabu Yamada	King of Pancrase tournament Tokyo, Japan	Dec 17, 1994	1. def. Bas Rutten at Pancrase Eyes Of Beast 2 on Mar 10, 1995 in Kanagawa, Japan
2	(Japan) Minoru Suzuki	Pancrase Eyes Of Beast 4 Tokyo, Japan	May 13, 1995	
3	(Netherlands) Bas Rutten	Pancrase 1995 Anniversary Show; Tokyo, Japan	Sep 1, 1995	1. def. interim champion Frank Shamrock at Pancrase Truth 5 on May 16, 1996 in Tokyo, Japan; 2. def. Masakatsu Funaki at Pancrase 1996 Anniversary Show on Sep 7, 1996 in Tokyo, Japan
—	(United States) Frank Shamrock def. Minoru Suzuki for interim title	Pancrase Truth 1 Kanagawa, Japan	Jan 28, 1996	
Rutten vacated the title in October 1996 for family matters.
4	(Japan) Masakatsu Funaki def. Jason DeLucia	Pancrase Truth 10; Tokyo, Japan	Dec 15, 1996	
5	(Japan) Yuki Kondo	Pancrase Alive 4 Tokyo, Japan	Apr 27, 1997	1. def. Jason DeLucia at Pancrase 1997 Anniversary Show on Sep 6, 1997 in Tokyo, Japan
6	(Japan) Masakatsu Funaki (2)	Pancrase Alive 11; Kanagawa, Japan	Dec 20, 1997	
7	(United States) Guy Mezger	Pancrase Advance 5 Kanagawa, Japan	Apr 26, 1998	1. def. Ryushi Yanagisawa at Pancrase 1998 Anniversary Show on Sep 14, 1998 in Tokyo, Japan; 2. def. Yuki Kondo at Pancrase Advance 12 on Dec 19, 1998 in Tokyo, Japan
Mezger vacated the title in February 1999 when he left Pancrase for the UFC.
8	(Japan) Yuki Kondo (2) def. Semmy Schilt	Pancrase Breakthrough 4 Kanagawa, Japan	Apr 18, 1999	1. def. Kiuma Kunioku at Pancrase 1999 Anniversary Show on Sep 18, 1999 in Tokyo, Japan
9	(Netherlands) Semmy Schilt	Pancrase Breakthrough 10; Osaka, Japan	Nov 28, 1999	1. def. Yoshiki Takahashi at Pancrase Trans 3 on Apr 30, 2000 in Kanagawa, Japan; 2. def. Osami Shibuya at Pancrase 2000 Anniversary Show on Sep 24, 2000 in Kanagawa, Japan
Schilt vacated the title in 2001 when he signed with the UFC.
10	(United States) Josh Barnett def. Yuki Kondo	Pancrase 10th Anniversary Show; Tokyo, Japan	Aug 31, 2003	1. def. Yoshiki Takahashi at NJPW Ultimate Crush II on October 13, 2003 in Tokyo, Japan; 2. def. Semmy Schilt at Inoki Bom-Ba-Ye 2003 - Inoki Festival on Dec 31, 2003 in Kobe, Japan

=== Super Heavyweight Championship ===
Weight limit: Over 105 kg (231.5 lb)
On January 30, 2008 Pancrase adopted a variant of Unified Rules of Mixed Martial Arts and retires the super heavyweight championship.

No.	Name	Event	Date	Defenses
1	(Japan) Tsuyoshi Kosaka def. Ron Waterman	Pancrase Brave 10; Chiba, Japan	Nov 7, 2004	
Kosaka vacated the title in January 2006.

=== Light Flyweight Championship ===
Weight limit: 54 kg (119.0 lb)
This weight class was disabled in 2016

No.	Name	Event	Date	Defenses
1	(Japan) Mitsuhisa Sunabe def. Hiroyuki Abe	Pancrase Impressive Tour 13; Tokyo, Japan	Dec 3, 2011	1. def. Masakazu Utsugi at Pancrase: Progress Tour 12 on Nov. 10, 2012 in Tokyo, Japan; 2. def. Noboru Tahara at Pancrase 252: 20th Anniversary on Sept. 29, 2013 in Yokohama, Japan
Sunabe vacated the title on September 9, 2015, when he dropped to compete in a lower weight class.
2	(Japan) Kento Kambe def. Yukitaka Musashi	Pancrase 273; Tokyo, Japan	Dec. 13, 2015	

== By nationality ==
The following include championship title holders by nationality.

Country	Titles
Japan	108
United States	10
Brazil	9
Tajikistan	3
Netherlands	2
Venezuela	1
Lithuania	1
Argentina	1

== See also ==
- List of current mixed martial arts champions
- List of Bellator MMA champions
- List of Dream champions
- List of EliteXC champions
- List of Invicta FC champions
- List of ONE Championship champions
- List of Pride champions
- List of PFL champions
- List of Road FC champions
- List of Shooto champions
- List of Strikeforce champions
- List of UFC champions
- List of WEC champions
- Mixed martial arts weight classes
