= Coffee with Cardamom (Ukrainian TV series) =

- Official series poster
- Кава з кардамоном
- Genre: Historical Drama
- Based on: Мелодія кави у тональності by Natalia Gurnytska's
- Written by: Simor Glasenko, Natalia Uvarova, Natalia Yakovleva, Olga Krzhechevska
- Directed by: Iryna Gromozda
- Composer: Alex Chorny
- Original language: Ukrainian
- No. of seasons: 2

Production
- Producers: Olena Lavrenyuk, Serge Lavrenyuk
- Cinematography: Oleksandr Roshchyn
- Editor: Sergii Klepach

Coffee with Cardamom (Ukrainian: Кава з кардамоном, pronounced [ˈ/ˈkɑwɐ z kɐrdɐˈmɔnɔm/]) is a 2021 Ukrainian historical costume drama TV series produced by Solar Media Entertainment and aired on the STB Network.

The first season—consisting of ten episodes—aired in December 2021, followed by a second season in 2025 entitled "Coffee with Cardamom: The Power of the Earth" (Кава з кардамоном. Сила землі). The series is based on Natalia Gurnytska's 2013 best selling novel Мелодія кави у тональності. The plot is set in mid-19th century Lviv during the Revolutions of 1848, where forbidden and social conflict play major roles.

Season 1 of the series centers around a baker-woman named Anna—played by Olena Lavrenyuk—who falls in love with a Polish nobleman, Count Adam Rodzinsky (played by Paweł Deląg). Season 2, however, shifts focus from Anna's love life to her transformation into a strong woman who defends both her land and family from newfound obstacles. Considered a massive success domestically, the show has also been noted to have gained notoriety in Poland, the United Arab Emirates, and Latin America as well. Directed by Iryna Hromozda, the series is also co-produced by Lavrenyuk.

== Plot ==
In Season 1, Anna Rodzins’ka, a young maiden in 1840s Lviv is running her family bakery whilst dreaming of true love, though she is supposed to marry a local merchant. However, this plan is shattered when wealthy Polish nobleman Count Adam Rodzinsky comes to town to visit his sick uncle Witold. Initially, Adam is condescending and frightening to Anna, though they gradually fall in love. It is later revealed that Adam was once married to a relative of Anna's, and as such, their romance is forbidden. As a result, The plot follows this "secret affair" amid the Ukrainian Spring of Nations crisis. At the end of the season, however, this romance is brought to an abrupt halt as Adam is arrested.

In Season 2, Anna undergoes a major character development wherein she becomes "a strong woman who fights for herself, for her children, for her land" as is reported by STB TV. During this season, the fate of Adam is revealed as well, and he makes no further appearances on the show (a result of the actor's departure from the show). In this season, two new love interests are introduced: Stefan Terletskyy, played by Oleksii Hnatkovskyi and Pavel Krushevsky, played by Alexsandr Kobzar. Initially, Kobzar's Pavel clashes with Anna over a land dispute, though they gradually fall in love. Simultaneously, Stefan is introduced as Pavel's rival for Anna's heart, though this season primary centers around Anna's struggle in defining her Ukrainian identity and being free on her own terms.

== Production ==
The series is produced by Solar Media Entertainment in partnership with the STB channel and Starlight Media with funding from Ukraine's State Film Agency. The series was written by a team composed of Simor Glasenko, Natalia Uvarova, Natalia Yakovleva, and Olga Krzhechevska and shot by cinematographer Oleksandr Roshchyn.

Costumes and makeup were noted as major focuses during production, with around 500-600 period costumes made for Season 2. Actors were also reported to have spent an hour or more in makeup each day.

While the director has placed an emphasis on historical authenticity, Lavrenyuk has noted the shift in the story's emotional tone. While Season 1 was presented as a linear and straight drama, the second season takes on a "dramedy" approach.

== Broadcast ==
Season 1 premiered in December 2021 on STB TV and ran for a total of 10 episodes. Season 2 premiered on December 1, 2025 via the Kyivstar streaming platform with 8 episodes, later broadcast by STB TV in 2026.

Internationally, the show has been sold to markets such as Poland, the United Arab Emirates, and Latin America, where Lavrenyuk has observed viewers that "have watched and loved" the series.

== Controversies ==
The show has had one notable controversy surrounding the departure of Paweł Deląg, who played Adam in Season 1. Reports have indicated that the departure was a result of Delag's "absolutely unprofessional" behavior on set, causing conflicts and delays. Director Gromozda has also admitted that Deląg was very difficult to work with and that "he brought texts to the set in which there was no room left for other actors, and categorically stated that he would play exactly as he wrote." Deląg has since continued his career mostly in Poland.

== Source Material ==
The series is directly adapted from Мелодія кави у тональності (The Coffee Melody in the Key of Cardamom) by Natalia Gurnytska, a 2013 best-selling historical romance novel set in the same time period also focusing on both Anna and Adam. The publisher's description describes the novel as a exploration of whether a couple's love can endure whilst " balancing on the edge of the abyss and breaking all possible prohibitions." While the novel provides the plot for the first season, the second season follows a plot taking place after the novel's events.

== Reception ==
In Ukraine, the show was considered a major ratings success and subsequently gained a following abroad as well—particularly among the Ukrainian diaspora.

Critics have praised the production values—such as costumes and set design—and Lavrenyuk's performance, as well as Anna's character growth in Season 2, something noticed by audiences as well.

In 2023, the show won "Best Fiction Series" at the Golden Dzyga Awards and it maintains a generally positive online presence. It is also considered one of STB's flagship series in recent years.
