= Mirror Wars: Reflection One =

- Theatrical film poster
- Directed by: Vasili Chiginsky
- Written by: Oleg Kapanets; Alex Kustanovich; Nicholas Waller
- Produced by: Oleg Kapanets
- Starring: Malcolm McDowell; Armand Assante; Rutger Hauer; Alexander Efimov; Ksenia Alfyorova; Valeri Nikolayev
- Cinematography: Sergey Koslov; Slava Gurchin
- Edited by: Ed Marx
- Music by: Alexei Belov; David Robbins
- Production companies: Kontsern "Kovsag"; Kremlin Films
- Distributed by: Seven Arts Pictures
- Release date: 1 October 2005
- Running time: 110 min.
- Country: Russia
- Language: English

Mirror Wars: Reflection One (Russian: Зеркальные Войны: Отражение Первое, romanized: Zerkalnyye Voyny: Otrazheniye Pervoye) is a 2005 Russian crime action film directed by Vasili Chiginsky, based on a screenplay by Oleg Kapanets, Alex Kustanovich and Nicholas Waller. The film stars both Russian actors Alexander Efimov and Ksenia Alfyorova, along with other international stars: Malcolm McDowell, Armand Assante and Rutger Hauer, as an effort to court an international audience. The enigmatic title refers to the continuation of a mystery revolving around a top-secret Russian fighter aircraft.

== Plot ==
Russian company Sukhoi has developed a fifth-generation jet fighter, the Sukhoi Su-XX, nicknamed Sabretooth, flown by test pilot Alexei Kedrov (Alexander Efimov), from a remote Russian airbase. Recently suspected of being a traitor due to his love affair with American ecologist Catherine Foley (Ksenia Alfyorova), Alexei is patriotic and is unaware that Catherine is not who she claims and is working with London-based arms dealer Dick Murdoch (Malcolm McDowell). A mystery man (Rutger Hauer) also appears to control the effort to steal the Sabretooth.

Murdoch and his new partner Aziza (Olga Yakovieva), want to steal the Russian jet and employing numerous mercenaries and clandestine agents, puts the entire flight test unit in jeopardy. Worried about his family, pilot Boris Korin (Valery Nikolaev) helps Murdoch steal Sabretooth. When Catherine is seen to be falling for Alexei, she is eliminated along with other assassinations and an audacious attack on a former Russian outpost. Alexei and other pilots in his team have to contend with not only the Russian FSB, but also agents from the CIA and British special services.

When Air Force One on the way to Moscow, is threatened, the McDonnell Douglas F-15 Eagle escorts try to shoot down Sabretooth but Alexei uses the extraordinary capability of his top-secret aircraft to outfly the American attack and bring his aircraft home safely.

Murdoch, however, with help from the mystery man behind the efforts to steal Sabretooth, is still at large.

== Cast ==
- Malcolm McDowell as Dick Murdoch / Mr. Simpson
- Armand Assante as CIA Agent Henry York
- Rutger Hauer as Mysterious Man
- Alexander Efimov as Alexei Kedrov ("Porter")
- Ksenia Alfyorova as Catherine Foley
- Valery Nikolaev as Boris Korin (credited as Valery Nikolaev)
- Mikhail Gorevoy as Manfred Darban
- Ivar Kalninsh as Anton Kedrov (credited as Ivar Kalninsh)
- Olga Yakovtseva as Aziza
- Anatoly Zhuravliov as Grom
- Amalia Mordvinova as Agent Orange
- Valery Afanasiev as Colonel Svirsky
- Alexander Kuznetsov as Agent Sea
- Alexander Rapoport as Ralph Trenton of the CIA
- Oleg Kapanets as Sobol
- Sergei Chonishvili as Igor Chaikin
- Justin Ipock as Boris
- Anna Vaskova as Wife of Boris
- Vladimir Vinogradov as Pavel Sokolov
- Alexander Yakovlev as Kalenov

== Production ==
Principal photography for Mirror Wars: Reflection One took place in Russia, with location shooting in Moscow and Crimea. Other photography took place in Los Angeles and London. Filming also involved several locations with military personnel, equipment and facilities provided.

The role of Sabretooth in Mirror Wars: Reflection One was played by the sole two-seat Sukhoi Su-35UB fighter as it can be seen in the real life scenes of the movie. (Note: The Su-35UB two-seat prototype was powered by two modified AL-31FPs with thrust-vectoring nozzles, making its first flight on 7 August 2000, later becoming an avionics testbed.) A 3D modeler for the movie said a Sukhoi Su-30MKI was used as a base fighter for the Sabretooth. Although the fighter demonstrator was one of the "stars", the film combines aerial closeups of jet fighters in close formation flying. Special effects include the use of pyrotechnical explosions, live-action closeup satellite imagery, and views from inside the flying jets, as well as extensive use of scale and CGI models.

The setting of the MAKS Air Show in Moscow includes footage of contemporary Russian military aircraft and an ancient Polikarpov I-153. Other aircraft seen in Mirror Wars: Reflection One include Mil Mi-24 and Mil Mi-17 helicopters along with Sukhoi Su-25, Sukhoi Su-35 and Ilyushin Il-78 aircraft.

== Reception ==
Although a Russian production, Mirror Wars: Reflection One featured English dialogue with Russian actors either speaking in English or being dubbed. Reputedly costing $10,000,000, the film was not critically received and did not do well at the box office, rating only in 50th place in Russia in 2005.

After a short theatrical run, Mirror Wars: Reflection One was released as a DVD for home media by Anchor Bay Entertainment.
