= Valery Nikolaev =

Russian actor

- Born: Valery Valeryevich Nikolaev; 23 August 1965 (age 60); Moscow, Russian SFSR, Soviet Union
- Occupations: Actor, director, TV
- Years active: 1987–2021, 2025–present

Valery Valeryevich Nikolaev (Russian: Валерий Валерьевич Николаев; born 23 August 1965) is a Soviet and Russian film and theater actor, director.

== Career ==
Nikolaev has choreographed five productions at the Chekhov MKhAT theater. He choreographed the musical My Fair Lady (Moscow, 2000), as well. In 1997, he traveled to Hollywood to play in Phillip Noyce's The Saint. Nikolaev graduated from MKhAT, where he studied under Oleg Tabakov. After graduation, Nikolaev performed with the Chekhov MKhAT theater.

== Selected filmography ==
He performed in more than thirty films since 1987.

Film
| Year | Title | Role | Notes |
|---|---|---|---|
| 1991 | Niagara | Pyotr Krasnovitsky | |
| 1991 | Leg | Unknown | original title Noga |
| 1992 | Love on Request | Aleks | |
| 1992 | Ochen vernaya zhena | Zhenya Monahov | |
| 1992 | Melochi zhizni | Gosha | Television series |
| 1993 | Nastya | Sasha Pichugin | |
| 1994 | Life and Extraordinary Adventures of Private Ivan Chonkin | Balashov | |
| 1995 | Shirli-Myrli | Step Performer | |
| 1996 | Thief Takers | Unknown | Television series (episode Black Russian) |
| 1997 | The Saint | Ilya Tretiak | |
| 1997 | Aberration | Yuri Romanov | |
| 1997 | U Turn | Mr. Arkady | |
| 2000 | Den rozhdeniya Burzhuya | Burzhuy | Television series |
| 2003 | Tor zum Himmel | Alexej | German movie |
| 2004 | The Terminal | Milodragovich | |
| 2005 | Mirror Wars | Boris | |
| 2006 | Vedma (The Power of Fear) | Ivan | |
| 2011 | The 5th Execution | Sanya | |
| 2012 | The Ballad of Uhlans | De Vitt | |
