= Fedor Emelianenko =

Russian mixed martial artist (born 1976)

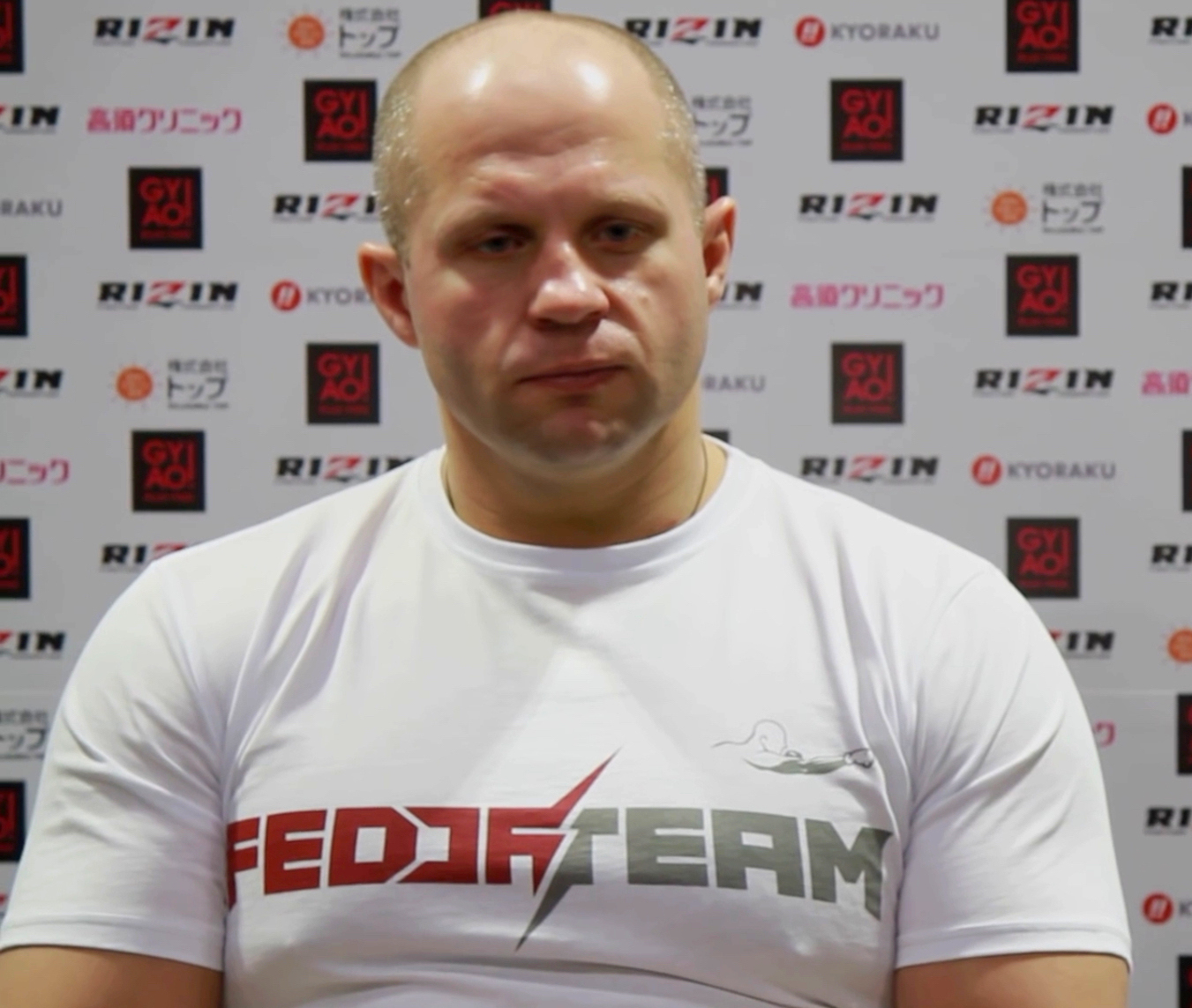
- Emelianenko in 2015
- Born: 28 September 1976 (age 50); Rubizhne, Ukrainian SSR, Soviet Union
- Native name: Фёдор Владимирович Емельяненко
- Other names: The Last Emperor
- Nationality: Russian
- Height: 6 ft 0 in (183 cm)
- Weight: 237 lb (108 kg; 16 st 13 lb)
- Division: Heavyweight
- Reach: 74 in (188 cm)
- Style: Combat Sambo, Judo
- Stance: Orthodox
- Fighting out of: Stary Oskol, Belgorod, Russia
- Team: FedorTeam (2015–present); Red Devil Sport Club/Alexander Nevsky OAMK (2003–2012); Russian Top Team (2000–2003)
- Teachers: Volk Han; Andrei Kopylov
- Trainer: Judo, Sambo: Vladimir Voronov; Boxing: Alexander Michkov; Muay Thai: Peter Teijsse; Kickboxing: Ernesto Hoost
- Rank: Merited Master of Sport and 1st Razryad Grand Master in Sambo; International Master of Sport and black belt in Judo; Master of Sport in Self-defense
- Years active: 2000–2012, 2015–2023 (MMA)

Mixed martial arts record
- Total: 48
- Wins: 40
- By knockout: 16
- By submission: 15
- By decision: 9
- Losses: 7
- By knockout: 6
- By submission: 1
- No contests: 1

Other information
- Occupation: Council of Physical Fitness & Sports (2012–present); Russian MMA Union (president; 2012–present); Belgorod Regional Duma (deputy; 2010–present); M-1 Global (co-owner; 2007–present); Russian Ground Forces (tank division; 1995–1997)
- University: Belgorod State University (department of physical education; g. 2008)
- Spouse: Oksana (m. 1999; div. 2006) (m. 2014) Marina (m. 2009; div. 2013)
- Children: 3
- Notable relatives: Alexander Emelianenko (brother)
- Notable students: Vadim Nemkov; Viktor Nemkov; Valentin Moldavsky; Maxim Grishin
- Notable club: Champions for Peace (2011–present)
- Mixed martial arts record from Sherdog

Fedor Emelianenko
Medal record

Representing Russia

Men's Combat Sambo

World Championships
Bronze medal – third place	2008 St. Petersburg	+100 kg
Gold medal – first place	2007 Prague	+100 kg
Gold medal – first place	2005 Prague	+100 kg
Gold medal – first place	2002 Panama City	+100 kg

World Combat Sambo Federation
Gold medal – first place	2002 Thessaloniki	+100 kg

European Championships
Gold medal – first place	1999 Istanbul	+100 kg

Russian Championships
Gold medal – first place	2012 Moscow	+100 kg
Gold medal – first place	2009 Kstovo	+100 kg
Gold medal – first place	2008 St. Petersburg	+100 kg
Gold medal – first place	2007 Ulan-Ude	+100 kg
Gold medal – first place	2005 Kstovo	+100 kg
Gold medal – first place	2002 Moscow	+100 kg
Bronze medal – third place	2000 Orenburg	+100 kg
Bronze medal – third place	1998 Kaliningrad	+100 kg

Men's Judo

Russian Championships
Bronze medal – third place	1999 Kstovo	Open
Bronze medal – third place	1998 Kstovo	-100 kg

Fedor Vladimirovich Emelianenko (Note: Russian: Фёдор Владимирович Емельяненко, romanized: Fyodor Vladimirovich Yemelyanenko, IPA: [ˈfʲɵdər vlɐˈdʲimʲɪrəvʲɪtɕ jɪmʲɪˈlʲjænʲɪnkə];) (born 28 September 1976) is a Russian former professional mixed martial artist (MMA), sambist, judoka and politician. Emelianenko was the PRIDE Heavyweight Champion from 2003 to the organisation's closure in 2007, a four-time combat sambo world champion, a seven-time combat sambo national champion, and two-time Russian national judo bronze medalist, among other championships and accolades. He also competed in RINGS, Strikeforce, M-1 Global, Rizin, and Bellator MMA, and is regarded as the most prominent fighter never to compete in the UFC (Ultimate Fighting Championship). Emelianenko is widely considered to be one of the greatest MMA fighters of all time, consistently ranked as the top heavyweight fighter from 2003 until 2010, and the best fighter of the 2000s. Emelianenko's career helped popularize the sport of MMA in his home country of Russia after gaining attention in Japan, South Korea, the United States, and worldwide.

Emelianenko began his MMA career on May 21, 2000, compiling four straight victories before a controversial loss in December 2000. Emelianenko was unbeaten in his first 28 fights up until June 2010, including wins over four former UFC champions, one future Strikeforce champion, two PRIDE champions, one former and two future K-1 champions, one Pancrase champion, and two Olympic medalists. He originally retired in June 2012 with a record of 34 wins and 4 losses before making his return in December 2015. Emelianenko retired for the second and final time on February 4, 2023, with a record of 40 wins, 7 losses, and 1 no contest, holding wins over seven (one interim) former UFC champions. Fight Matrix currently ranks him as by far the greatest heavyweight mixed martial artist of all time, and the fourth greatest fighter of all time pound-for-pound.

Emelianenko began his political career in 2010, being elected as a deputy of the Belgorod Regional Duma. He subsequently became president of the Russian MMA Union (later honorary president and chairman of the supervisory board), and a staff member of Russia's Council of Physical Fitness & Sports.

== Early life ==
Emelianenko was born in 1976 in the city of Rubizhne, Luhansk Oblast, Ukrainian SSR, Soviet Union. In 1978, when he was two, his family moved within the Soviet Union to Stary Oskol, Belgorod of the Russian SFSR. His mother, Olga Fedorovna, was a teacher, and his father, Vladimir Alexandrovich, was a welder.

At age 11, Emelianenko began to practice sambo and judo under the tutelage of Vasily Ivanovich Gavrilov. A year later, he was admitted to sport classes taught by Vladimir Voronov, a coach who worked with him. According to Voronov, Emelianenko did not stand out from his peers initially but would achieve future success thanks to his own perseverance and hard work for many years. Voronov died in August 2020 due to complications caused by coronavirus.

Emelianenko finished high school in 1991 and graduated with honors from a professional trade school as an electrician in 1994. From 1995 to 1997, he served in the Russian Army as a military firefighter and then as a member of the tank division near Nizhny Novgorod. His parents divorced during this time.

In 1997, Emelianenko received the certification of "Master of Sport" in judo and sambo. He also became part of the Russian national team and won an international judo tournament in Kursk the same year. Emelianenko's partial record in judo was 12 wins and 7 losses in 1999-2000. In 1999, he took third place at both the Moscow International Tournament and the Sofia Liberation A-Team tournament.

In 2000, due to a lack of money, Emelianenko left the Russian national team and began to compete professionally in mixed martial arts.

== Mixed martial arts career ==
=== Club affiliation ===
Emelianenko began his mixed martial arts as a member of Russian Top Team (RTT), a stable linked to Fighting Network RINGS where he trained under senior members like Volk Han and Andrei Kopylov. After his bout with Gary Goodridge, the Emelianenko brothers left Russian Top Team and began to train in St. Petersburg with Red Devil Sport Club, managed by Vadim Finkelchtein. Finkelchtein would remain his manager up until his first retirement in mid 2012. Emelianenko is also a member of the VOS gym in the Netherlands, where he trains with Johan Vos and Lucien Carbin. Emelianenko has trained with the likes of Ernesto Hoost, Tyrone Spong, and Denis Lebedev.

=== 2000-2001: RINGS ===
Emelianenko suffered his first loss in a controversial bout against Tsuyoshi Kohsaka at the King of Kings 2000 Block B event on 22 December 2000, via doctor stoppage due to a cut 17 seconds into the fight. Footage shows that the cut was caused by a missed looping punch where Kohsaka's elbow struck Emelianenko's head. Emelianenko said that this elbow reopened a cut sustained in his previous fight against Ricardo Arona. The controversy surrounding the loss was due to the fact elbow strikes were illegal for the event.

After defeating Renato Sobral in an elimination bout, Emelianenko fought for the World Heavyweight Class Championship against Bobby Hoffman the same night. However, Hoffman refused to fight Emelianenko, asserting he had sustained an injury to his shoulder during his previous match, and forfeited. Emelianenko was awarded the win by default and he was given the RINGS Heavyweight Class Championship.

=== 2002-2006: PRIDE Fighting Championships ===
Entering the Pride Fighting Championships on the heels of winning the RINGS King of Kings 2002 tournament, Emelianenko debuted at Pride 21 on 23 June 2002 against the 6 ft 11 in (2.11 m), 256 lb (116 kg) Dutch fighter Semmy Schilt, whom he defeated by unanimous decision. His next opponent was heavyweight Heath Herring, in a contest to establish the number-one heavyweight contender. Emelianenko, considered an underdog, dominated Herring with ground-and-pound, winning by doctor-stoppage after the first round.

==== PRIDE Heavyweight Championship ====
Emelianenko was then signed to fight heavily favored Antônio Rodrigo Nogueira for Pride's Heavyweight Championship title at Pride 25 on 16 March 2003. Nogueira was coming off wins against Mark Coleman, Heath Herring and an upset comeback victory against Bob Sapp, as well as victory in the RINGS 2000 King of Kings Tournament, in which Emelianenko had participated. Nogueira was considered by many fans to be virtually unbeatable, due to his endurance and submission skills. Emelianenko rocked him early with punches and Nogueira pulled guard. Emelianenko survived Nogueira's guard, considered the most dangerous in MMA and easily defended all of Nogueira's submission attempts, dominating him for 20 minutes with a brutal ground and pound. The judges rendered a unanimous decision and Emelianenko became the second Pride Heavyweight Champion, a title he would never lose.

Three months later Emelianenko embarked on his title defense. His first match was against former IWGP Heavyweight champion, amateur and professional wrestler Kazuyuki Fujita. A heavy favorite, Emelianenko was expected to make quick work of Fujita, but was caught by a right hook that stunned him. Badly hurt, he worked his way to a clinch, but was taken down. With Fujita unable to amount a significant attack, Emelianenko was able to recover. He worked his way up and knocked Fujita down with body kick and a punching combo. He then submitted Fujita at 4:17 in the first round with a rear naked choke. Emelianenko reminisced about it in February 2009, "Fujita is the only one who ever hit me right, and he hit hard!".

Next came a one-sided bout against heavy underdog Gary "Big Daddy" Goodridge at Pride Total Elimination 2003. Emelianenko took down Goodridge after wobbling him with standing combinations, then finished him with ground and pound in the first round by referee stoppage. Emelianenko broke his hand in this fight, resulting in surgery. He subsequently reinjured this hand, leading to several postponed bouts. In 2011, Goodridge recalled his fight with Emelianenko; "Fedor hits so hard, I don't remember anything (from the fight). No one has his speed and power combo. He fought for 10 years at the top. He doesn't owe anything else to the sport."

His next fight against New Japan professional wrestler Yuji Nagata at Inoki Bom-Ba-Ye 2003 ended the same way, with Emelianenko first knocking Nagata to the ground twice with punches. Emelianenko fought at this event as opposed to Shockwave 2003 on the same day due to a higher fight purse because of the competition between the Japanese television networks screening these events and K-1 Premium Dynamite!! on the same night. Pride then set up an interim title match between Antônio Rodrigo Nogueira and Mirko Cro Cop, which ended with Nogueira winning via second round armbar.

==== PRIDE 2004 Heavyweight World Grand Prix ====
A notable match with Coleman's protégé Kevin "The Monster" Randleman followed just two months later at the tournament's second round. Randleman, a two-time Division I NCAA Wrestling Champion for Ohio State University and a former UFC Heavyweight Champion, was coming off an upset win over Mirko Cro Cop, which he ended by knockout. Randleman quickly scored a takedown. As Emelianenko gave his back, Randleman delivered a German suplex, slamming him to the canvas headfirst, a move that would become one of the most replayed highlights in PRIDE's and MMA's history for years to come. Emelianenko, seemingly unfazed, rolled over Randleman a few seconds later, getting top position and forcing him to submit with a kimura armlock 1:33 into the first round.

On 15 August 2004, Emelianenko faced six-time All-Japan Judo Champion and Olympic Silver Medalist Naoya Ogawa in the semifinals of the 2004 Grand Prix. After making quick work of Ogawa, winning by armbar, he advanced to face Antônio Rodrigo Nogueira for the second time in his career. Nogueira had won a decision against Emelianenko's former teammate Sergei Kharitonov earlier that night. This match was not only to decide the winner of the 2004 Grand Prix, but to unify the heavyweight championship, as Nogueira was awarded the interim title due to Emelianenko's inability to defend his championship in a timely manner in the previous year. The rematch with Nogueira was very competitive, but the fight was stopped prematurely due to a cut to Emelianenko's head from an accidental head clash while on the ground. A third meeting was thus scheduled for Shockwave 2004, which Emelianenko won. On the line was PRIDE's Heavyweight Championship, and PRIDE's 2004 Heavyweight Grand Prix title, as the final match of the tournament earlier that year was declared a no contest due to an accidental headbutt. Emelianenko this time chose not to engage Nogueira on the ground, in spite of having dominated him there in their first match. He overpowered the Brazilian on his feet in the first round, beating him to the punch for the first nine minutes. Nogueira faced great difficulty, getting dropped with punches and tossed to the mat multiple times by Judo throws. He was not able to implement his game plan of putting Emelianenko on his back, save for the final 30 seconds of the first round. He was not able to pull guard for any considerable time. During the second and third rounds, Emelianenko's takedown defense and counter-punching earned him a unanimous decision victory to retain the heavyweight championship.

==== Title defense against Mirko Cro Cop ====
The match between Emelianenko and Cro Cop finally took place at PRIDE Final Conflict 2005. In the first round, Emelianenko was stunned and had his nose broken by two stiff jabs from Cro Cop. He got hit by body kicks that discolored his midsection. Emelianenko was then able to get the fight to the ground and land several body shots, which weakened his opponent. As the fight progressed, Emelianenko became more and more dominant, winning most of the stand up exchanges and scoring several takedowns. After 20 minutes, Emelianenko was awarded victory by unanimous decision.

==== Later PRIDE years ====
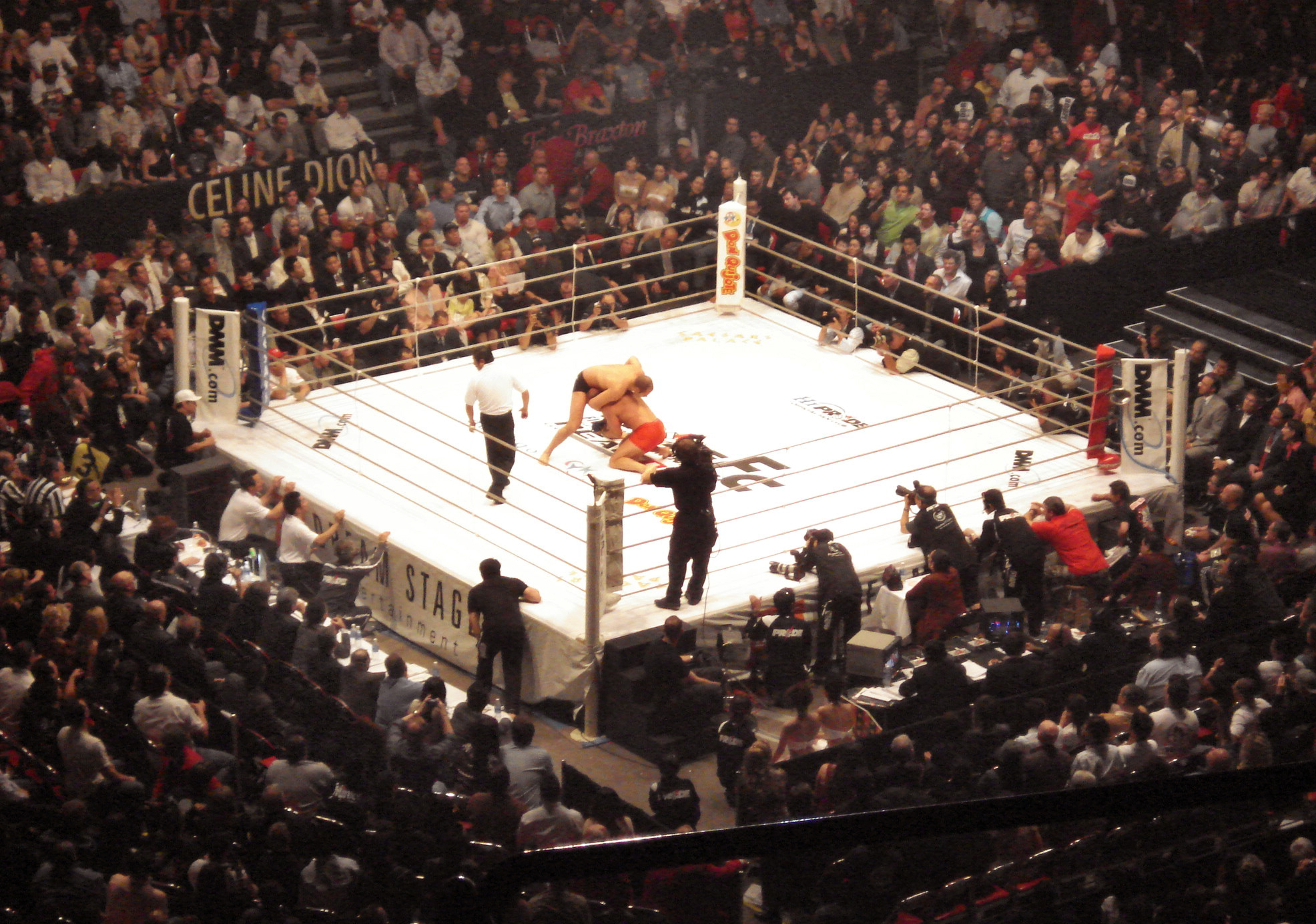
Emelianenko vs Coleman at Pride 32 in late 2006.

Although originally endangered due to Emelianenko's recurring hand injury, a plate inserted in his hand enabled a rematch with Coleman in Pride's American debut show, Pride 32. In a fight where Coleman was unable to mount any significant offense, Emelianenko pounded him in the first round with punches, before securing an armbar at 1:15 in the second round.

Emelianenko's last defense of his Pride Heavyweight title was against 2001 K-1 World Grand Prix champion Mark Hunt at Shockwave 2006. Josh Barnett was originally slated to fight Emelianenko for the Heavyweight title, but turned down the fight, asserting that he was unprepared. With Cro Cop's departure to the UFC organization in late 2006, Hunt became number-one contender. Sporting a broken toe during the contest, Emelianenko nevertheless secured an armbar in the second minute of the first round, but Hunt was able to escape and counter by stepping over Emelianenko, ending in side control. At five minutes into the first round, Hunt made two attempts at an americana on Emelianenko's left arm but failed to complete them. Emelianenko got back to his feet and after struggling to take the fight to the ground, he submitted Hunt with a kimura at 8:16 in the first round.

=== M-1 Global ===
After the purchase of Pride Fighting Championships by Lorenzo and Frank Fertitta III and the expiration of Emelianenko's Pride contract, there was speculation about him fighting in the UFC, especially after a public falling out between Bodog's Calvin Ayre and Emelianenko's manager, Vadim Finkelchtein. In a June 2007 interview with the Baltimore Sun, Chuck Liddell suggested that Emelianenko was on his way to the UFC. The following month, it was revealed that he was also a minority owner of M-1 Global. UFC president Dana White expressed interest in signing Emelianenko, but considered his management team to be the primary barrier, whereas Finkelchtein cited difficult negotiations as the reason. A main point of contention between the two was Finkelchtein's request for the UFC to work with his Russian M-1 promotion, extending contractual offers to other members of the Red Devil Sport Club, and permitting Emelianenko to compete in combat sambo tournaments. At UFC 76, White stated that he expected Emelianenko to sign with the UFC in late 2007 or early 2008, after Emelianenko finished competing in sambo. He revealed his intent to set up a unification bout with UFC heavyweight champion Randy Couture as his first UFC fight. Nevertheless, negotiations broke down, as Emelianenko committed to a non-exclusive, two-year and six-fight deal with M-1 Global in October 2007.

In 2007, Emelianenko made the cover of Karaté Bushido, the oldest magazine dedicated to martial arts in Europe, joining martial artists such as Bruce Lee (1974), Jean-Claude Van Damme (1993), Bas Rutten (1997), Rickson Gracie (1998), Jackie Chan (2000), Georges St-Pierre (2008), Jérôme Le Banner (2012), Francis Ngannou (2019), and Dave Leduc (2020).

=== 2007: BodogFight and Yarennoka! ===
With a special clause in his Pride contract that allowed him to fight under the banner of any MMA organization as long as the event was held on Russian soil, Emelianenko accepted a match in BodogFight against Matt Lindland. The fight was held on 14 April 2007 at the "Clash of the Nations" event in St. Petersburg, Russia. Lindland moved up two weight classes (from middleweight to heavyweight) for the match and came in weighing 212.5 lb (96.5 kg) to Emelianenko's 230 lb (104.5 kg).

Early in the fight, Lindland opened a cut above Emelianenko's left eye and clinched with him, pushing him into the corner and working for a takedown. At this point, the referee warned Emelianenko against grabbing the ropes and Emelianenko corrected himself. After a few seconds in the clinch, Lindland attempted a bodylock takedown. When Lindland lifted Emelianenko from his feet, Emelianenko reversed the takedown, landing in Lindland's half guard. The fight then remained on the ground where Emelianenko won by submission via armbar at 2:58 of the first round.

President and CEO of M-1 Global Monte Cox confirmed Emelianenko would face South Korean kickboxer Hong-man Choi in a New Year's Eve event, Yarennoka!, taking place in Japan and organized by former Pride staff with support from M-1 Global, FEG, and DEEP. A special rule was used for this fight to not allow any knee strikes on the ground. The fight was broadcast live in the United States on cable network HDNet. Emelianenko defeated Choi in the opening round by submission via an armbar.

=== Negotiations with DREAM ===
On 13 February 2008, Emelianenko attended a press conference held by Dream, a newly formed Japanese mixed martial arts promoter. Vadim Finkelchtein confirmed that the organization had a tightly knit alliance with M-1 Global and that Emelianenko would be fighting on the new organization's fight cards. M-1 Global CEO Vadim Finkelchtein recently revealed plans to organize a fight for Fedor in co-operation with Dream, possibly on New Year's Eve in Japan.

=== 2008–2009: Affliction ===
On 19 July 2008, at Affliction: Banned, Emelianenko faced former two-time UFC Heavyweight Champion Tim Sylvia. Sylvia was coming off a submission loss via guillotine choke at the hands of Antônio Rodrigo Nogueira at UFC 81 in a title fight for the interim UFC Heavyweight Championship. Sylvia was the fourth-ranked heavyweight fighter in MMA by Sherdog.com prior to his fight with Emelianenko.

Emelianenko defeated Sylvia in 36 seconds. He dropped him with a quick punch combination, took his back and then finished the fight via submission due to a rear naked choke. Sylvia said in the post-fight press conference, "I know that I'm one of the best in the world, I was amazed at how good Fedor is. He hurt me right away and submitted me. The guy's a stud. I don't even think he's human. That guy hits hard. I've never been hit that hard before."

Dana White, who had previously criticized the fighter, asserted that he was impressed with Emelianenko's performance against ex-UFC champion Sylvia. When asked if the submission win changed his opinion on Fedor, White said; "It does. Tim Sylvia was a real opponent."

On 24 January 2009, at Affliction: Day of Reckoning, Emelianenko fought former UFC Heavyweight Champion Andrei Arlovski, who was widely considered a top-5 heavyweight at the time. Arlovski was on a five-bout win streak and was ranked as high as No. 2 by Sherdog.com. Arlovski had some early success in the fight, landing punches and kicks. However, as Emelianenko backed into the ropes, Arlovski attempted a flying knee and Emelianenko was able to counter with an overhand right which resulted in a knockout of Arlovski at 3:14 of the first round. The victory was awarded knockout of the year for 2009 by Sherdog. The preparation for this bout overlapped with filming for the movie "The 5th Execution".

Emelianenko met Shinya Aoki during a five-minute "special exhibition" at a 29 April M-1 Challenge (presented by Affliction) event in Tokyo. Emelianenko made Aoki tap out from an Achilles lock just before the bell sounded to end the exhibition. In another exhibition match, Emelianenko met Gegard Mousasi, a friend and teammate, during M-1 Global: Breakthrough, held in Kansas City on 28 August. The two friends fought a competitive and friendly spirited exhibition with several Judo throws from both Emelianenko and Mousasi. Emelianenko finished the fight via armbar.

Emelianenko was scheduled to fight former UFC Heavyweight Champion Josh Barnett on 1 August 2009, at Affliction: Trilogy, but on 22 July Barnett was denied his license to compete by the California State Athletic Commission after testing positive for anabolic steroids. On 23 July 2009, Vitor Belfort – who was already on the card – was reported as a likely replacement, but the next day Affliction canceled the event citing limited time to find a suitable replacement and inadequate time to promote the fight.

=== Unsuccessful negotiations with the UFC ===
After the collapse of Affliction, UFC President Dana White tried repeatedly to sign Emelianenko to an exclusive UFC contract. White said of Emelianenko; "He has become my obsession. I want it (him in the UFC) worse than the fans want it." Widely considered to be the best heavyweight MMA fighter at the time, Emelianenko would receive an immediate title shot against then current UFC Heavyweight Champion Brock Lesnar, an event that White deemed "huge". After reportedly offering Emelianenko a contract worth just under 2 million US dollars per fight, with incentives to make much more based on pay per view revenues for fights he headlined, negotiations fell apart after Emelianenko's management team demanded a co-promotion between UFC and M-1 Global, terms which White deemed unacceptable.

In 2012, White tried to lure Emelianenko out of retirement after overwhelming fan demand for a UFC bout between Emelianenko and Brock Lesnar. However, White stated that Emelianenko was firmly retired.

=== 2009–2011: Strikeforce ===
Following the failed negotiations with the UFC, Emelianenko signed a three-fight contract with Strikeforce. Strikeforce CEO Scott Coker confirmed that Emelianenko's debut would take place on 7 November, broadcast nationally on CBS.

Emelianenko's first fight in Strikeforce was against then-undefeated Brett Rogers in the main event of Strikeforce: Fedor vs. Rogers on 7 November 2009. Emelianenko won the fight via TKO in the second round.

Emelianenko suffered his first loss in 10 years on 26 June 2010 to Fabrício Werdum. After knocking Werdum down early in the first round, Emelianenko closed in, but Werdum secured a deep triangle and an armbar from his guard, and Fedor was forced to tap. Emelianenko stated through a translator on The MMA Hour that he considered retirement before the Werdum fight due to accumulating injuries and ageing.

In January 2011, it was announced that Fedor had agreed to enter the Strikeforce Heavyweight Grand Prix, and would face Antônio Silva on 12 February in the first quarterfinal match. After a close first round, Silva took control in round 2. After passing to mount, he unleashed a barrage of ground-and-pound that ultimately caused Emelianenko's right eye to swell shut. Ringside doctors called a stop, stating that Emelianenko could not see.

Emelianenko faced Dan Henderson on 30 July 2011 at Strikeforce: Fedor vs. Henderson. After both fighters landed significant punches in the first round, Fedor knocked Henderson down with a combination of strikes. Fedor followed Henderson to the mat and began to ground-and-pound him but Henderson was able to sweep and reverse position before delivering a punch underneath Fedor's armpit which landed on his chin, knocking Fedor unconscious, and sending him face first into the mat. Henderson continued to punch Fedor until referee Herb Dean jumped in to stop the fight. Dean explained, saying, "The fight is over when he's unconscious. Because he comes back swiftly after I've already stepped in and stopped the fight, I can't restart the fight. Dan's still throwing punches, but once I've touched Dan, I've stopped the fight. If I was to do it again – if I see a fighter face down receiving shots, I'm going to step in and stop the fight. I can't predict how long he's going to be unconscious for."

Following his third loss in a row, Emelianenko was reportedly released from Strikeforce. UFC president Dana White stated he was being released, "Yeah, he's being cut." However, Emelianenko disputed White's claims, saying, "That's Dana White's style to make comments. I didn't have a contract with Strikeforce. My current contract is with Showtime. So I think people shouldn't pay attention to these "loud" comments." According to M-1 Global Director of Operations Evgeni Kogan, Fedor was only under contract to Showtime and from there he fought under the Strikeforce banner, but was never a direct employee of Zuffa, and therefore was not "cut". "Strikeforce is not the only MMA promotion on Showtime so there are a number of options for Fedor which will be looked at," Kogan told MMA Weekly.

On 7 October 2011 Emelianenko stated "Yes, I've lost my last fights, but every time there were definite reasons for that. Some changes in my family took place at that time and they affected my performance. Certainly, there were mistakes in my preparations. Naturally, I was strained analyzing my fights,". Four days later, Emelianenko continued on the subject: "In the three bouts I lost, I felt like I could've won. But the win somehow eluded me. I felt I could do it. I had chances, but God's will was different."

=== 2011–2012: Return to Russia, Japan and retirement ===
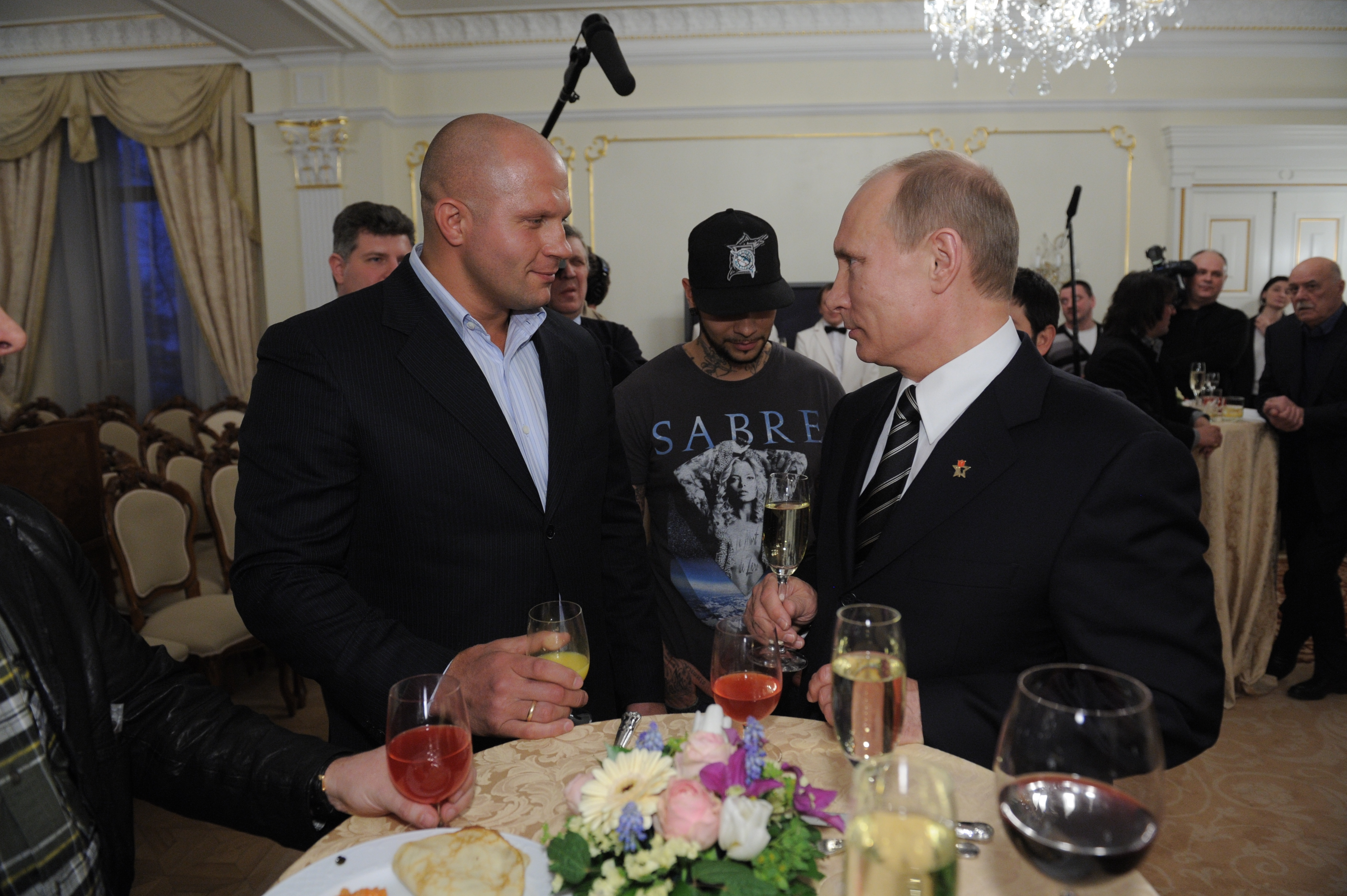
Emelianenko with Vladimir Putin in March 2012.

Following his stint in Strikeforce, Emelianenko fought Jeff Monson at M-1 Global on 20 November 2011 at the Olympic Arena in Moscow, Russia.

After four years, Emelianenko made his return to Japan—where he spent most of his career—at Fight For Japan: Genki Desu Ka Omisoka 2011 on 31 December 2011, facing Satoshi Ishii. Emelianenko won by knockout in the first round.

On 21 June 2012 in St. Petersburg, Russia, Emelianenko faced three-time UFC heavyweight title contender Pedro Rizzo in an M-1 Global event. Prior to the bout, it was rumored that Fedor would retire. Originally denying retirement rumors, Emelianenko made his announcement post-fight after defeating Rizzo by knockout in the first two minutes of the first round.

Although Emelianenko retired as a competitor, he remained president of the Russian MMA Union.

He was a top 10 heavyweight from January 2002 to July 2011 according to FightMatrix, holding the #1 rank from April 2003 to April 2010.

=== 2015: Coming out of retirement ===
On 14 July 2015, after a three year hiatus from mixed martial arts, Emelianenko announced that he will be returning to active competition and has started training immediately. He was in negotiations with the Ultimate Fighting Championship and Bellator MMA. In a statement released through his management, Emelianenko added that he has retired from his position at the Russian Ministry of Sport, and will put all attention toward his comeback.

On 19 September 2015, at the Bellator 142 Dynamite 1 event, Fedor declared in English that he will fight on New Year's Eve for a newly created regional promotion in Japan, Rizin Fighting Federation, under the presidency of former Pride Fighting Championships boss Nobuyuki Sakakibara. Jaideep Singh and Tsuyoshi Kohsaka were initially in talks for being Fedor's opponent, but both fighters were ruled out for lack of competitiveness. Singh was eventually confirmed as the opponent and The Last Emperor easily won his comeback fight in the first round by submission to punches.

=== 2016: Eurasia Fight Nights Global 50 fight versus Maldonado ===
Emelianenko faced Fábio Maldonado on 17 June 2016 competing for a promotion on the regional circuit in St. Petersburg (Russia). Despite being dropped and nearly finished in the first round, Emelianenko rallied over the last two rounds and was awarded a controversial majority decision victory. 4 of 5 media outlets scored the bout a draw. All three judges being appointed by the Russian MMA Union was pondered as a conflict of interest. In turn, in mid-July the official result was overturned to a draw. However, WMMAA has no real authority to change the outcome and its decision is merely symbolic in nature.

Emelianenko later announced that he was going to pursue his career and study all the proposals he had received; the most anticipated being the one from the UFC, which Emelianenko confirmed he received prior to the fight against Maldonado.

=== 2017–2023: Bellator MMA ===
On 19 November 2016, during the Bellator 165 broadcast it was announced that Emelianenko signed a multi-fight deal with Bellator MMA.

On 20 November 2016 it was announced that Emelianenko would face Matt Mitrione at Bellator's 18 February 2017 show in San Jose, California at Bellator 172. The fight was canceled only few hours before the fight as Mitrione was suffering from kidney stones and the promoter was unable to line up a substitute opponent in such a short notice. This fight against Mitrione was rescheduled for the Bellator NYC on 24 June 2017. He lost the fight via knockout in the first round.

In November 2017, Bellator announced the 2018 Bellator Heavyweight Grand Prix that will crown the Bellator Heavyweight champion, vacated in May 2016 by Vitaly Minakov. Eight fighters will compete between February and December 2018.

Emelianenko faced former UFC Heavyweight champion Frank Mir at Bellator 198 on 28 April 2018. The bout was part of the opening round of the Bellator Heavyweight Tournament. Emelianenko won the fight via TKO in the first round. He next faced Chael Sonnen in the semi-finals at Bellator 208 on 13 October 2018. Emelianenko won the fight via TKO in the first round.

In October 2018, Fedor Emelianenko left the post of the Russian MMA Union's President. After this, he became the Honorary President and Chairman of the Supervisory Board of the Union.

In the final, Emelianenko faced Ryan Bader for the vacant Bellator Heavyweight World Championship in the main event at Bellator 214 on 26 January 2019. He lost the fight via knockout just 35 seconds into round one.

Despite contemplating retirement, news surfaced on 15 June 2019, that Emelianenko had signed a new exclusive, multi-fight contract with Bellator.

Emelianenko fought Quinton Jackson on 29 December 2019 at a Bellator and Rizin co-produced event in Japan. He won the fight via technical knockout in round one.

Emelianenko fought Timothy Johnson on 23 October 2021 at Bellator 269. He won the bout via knockout in round one.

Emelianenko faced Ryan Bader in a rematch for the Bellator Heavyweight World Championship on 4 February 2023 at Bellator 290. He lost the bout via ground and pound TKO in the first round, retiring from MMA after the bout.

== Combat Sambo career ==
Emelianenko competed in combat sambo both before (1998-2000) and during (2000-2012) his MMA career. Before becoming a mixed martial artist he had already won several medals in competition, including bronze at both the 1998 and 2000 Russian Combat Sambo National Championships, gold at the 1998 Russian Armed Forces Championships, and gold at the 1999 European Combat Sambo Championships. After beginning his MMA career and parallel with his MMA run before his first retirement, he became a seven-time national champion (2002, 2005, 2007, 2008, 2008, 2009, 2012) and four-time world champion (2002, 2002, 2005, 2007) in combat sambo.

In 2002 Emelianenko won gold at the tournaments of both the FIAS World Combat Sambo Championships and the Russian Combat Sambo National Championships, as well as the WCSF World Combat Sambo Championships, for a total of three gold medals that year. His final match at the 2002 World Combat Sambo Championships was against Oleg Savitsky (United States), who he defeated by armbar submission.

In 2005 Emelianenko won gold at the tournaments of both the World Combat Sambo Championships and the Russian Combat Sambo National Championships yet again, receiving two more gold medals. At the 2005 world championships he went 3-0, defeating his second opponent by technical fall and his final opponent by submission. He also won several regional tournaments under the Combat Sambo Federation of Russia including the 2003 Union of Heroes Cup, 2003 Moscow Open, and 2004 Dagestan Open.

On 10 November 2007, Emelianenko won his final world title in combat sambo at the FIAS World Sambo Championships in Prague. He went 3-0 in the tournament, defeating Rustamov Samad (Uzbekistan), Dimitrov Yancho (Bulgaria), and Begeza Vladimir (Ukraine) to win the gold medal. In February of the same year, he won the Russian Combat Sambo National Championship by going 3-0 in that tournament as well. He defeated Rinat Kurbanov and Armen Arustamov both by early armbar submission, and accepted the forfeit of Maxim Novosiolov, who had injured his arm in his previous match.

In 7–8 February 2008, he went 4-0 in the Russian Combat Sambo National Championship tournament in a twelve man bracket, with his final opponent being Stanislav Shushko, who he defeated by submission. Less than a week later at 14–16 February 2008 Russia's President's Cup Sambo tournament, Emelianenko went 3-0 again and won his second national title that year by defeating Kamil Chrobak (Czechia), Sang Soo Lee (Korea), and Blagoy Ivanov (Bulgaria). In the 13–17 November 2008 World Combat Sambo Championship tournament, Emelianenko would suffer his only combat sambo loss between 2000 and 2012, going 1-1 in the tournament. After defeating Kamil Chrobak (Czechia) by submission in the quarter-finals, he faced Blagoy Ivanov in the semi-finals. Despite having defeated Ivanov earlier that year, Emelianenko lost their rematch on points, leaving him with a bronze medal while Ivanov would go on to win the world tournament and the gold medal.

In 20–23 February 2009, he went 3-0 in the Russian Combat Sambo National Championship tournament by defeating Sokrat Kurbanov, Ivan Frolov, and Aleksey Knyazev. Knyazev would himself win gold at the World Combat Sambo Championships in Thessaloniki the same year that he lost to Emelianenko at the nationals. In 19–23 February 2010, Emelianenko entered the nationals again. He won two bouts by submission but withdrew from the tournament before proceeding due to a hand injury.

In 3–5 February 2012, Emelianenko competed in his final national combat sambo tournament. Out of a fourteen man bracket, Emelianenko went 4-0 in the tournament to win the 2012 Russian Combat Sambo National Championship at 100+ kg. After submitting Kirill Sidelnikov with an armlock in 11 seconds in the semi-finals, his final combat sambo bout for the finals was a quick and ceremonial armbar submission of his brother Alexander.

Emelianenko's combat sambo record in the 2007, 2008, 2009, 2010, and 2012 tournaments documented above totaled 23 wins and 1 loss.

== Legacy and fighting style ==
Sports Illustrated, among other publications, named Emelianenko as the top MMA fighter of the 2000s. Former combat sports fighters Chuck Norris and Mike Tyson; MMA fighters such as Junior dos Santos, Fabrício Werdum, Jose Aldo, Georges St-Pierre, Khabib Nurmagomedov; and several publications have called Emelianenko the greatest mixed martial artist of all time. MMA referee John McCarthy, sports commentator Michael Schiavello and others, have compared Emelianenko's impact and legacy in MMA to the likes of Muhammad Ali, Pelé, Wayne Gretzky, and their legacies in their respective sports. Sports and MMA media, ESPN, Bleacher Report, Sherdog, SB Nation (mmafighting) and Fight Matrix, list him as the greatest MMA heavyweight fighter of all time. Emelianenko is also the longest-reigning heavyweight lineal champion. As of 2021, Emelianenko has defeated seven former UFC champions. In 2020, UFC President Dana White stated that the only fight he regrets not having made was a match between Emelianenko and Brock Lesnar, when Lesnar was the UFC heavyweight champion.

Although Emelianenko is mainly known as a striker, he is considered to excel in all of the attributes of the MMA game. MMA analyst Jack Slack wrote that, "very few men can claim to have Olympic alternate level judo and still able to out-strike the best kickboxer in MMA history". Mixed martial arts champion and commentator Bas Rutten described Emelianenko's versatility as, "if you give him an arm, he arm-bars you. If you give him a leg, he leg locks you. If you give him a punch, he knocks you out."

From 2000 to 2010, Emelianenko went over ten years and 33 fights with only one loss in professional MMA, a controversial doctor's stoppage after being cut by an accidental foul by Tsuyoshi Kohsaka (who he later TKO'd in a separate bout). Simultaneously he went undefeated in dozens of combat sambo fights across ten national and international tournaments, winning gold in all of them. Among his MMA wins in this time were four former UFC Heavyweight Champions (Coleman, Randleman, Sylvia, and Arlovski), the only other PRIDE Heavyweight Champion (Nogueira, also a future interim UFC Heavyweight Champion), a former K-1 and Glory Heavyweight Champion (Schilt), a future Strikeforce Light Heavyweight Champion (Sobral), a K-1 World Grand Prix Champion (Hunt), and the 2006 PRIDE Open-Weight Grand Prix Champion (Filipović).

Emelianenko medaled in at least 20 combat sambo tournaments, including 16 golds, 1 silver, and 3 bronzes.

In the stand-up, Emelianenko's aggressive boxing makes a wide usage of the Russian hook popularised by Igor Vovchanchyn, as well as other types of more technical power punches to the body and head. This, combined with smart footwork, allows him to disrupt the offence of more scientific strikers and land strikes. He frequently darts into striking range with either a left hook or an overhand right to disrupt counterpunches, resulting in a flurry of punches that often stun or flatten his opponents.

Emelianenko has shown a high level acumen of hip throws from judo and sambo to bring his adversary to the ground, preferring to work from the clinch as opposed to the more common leg take downs. Once on the mat, he favors a strategy of ground-and-pound executed with viciousness and dynamism, able to negate his opponent's work from the bottom and cause damage with heavy strikes. He rarely seeks to improve position over his opponent, instead attacking freely from positions widely considered as dangerous, sometimes baiting for submissions in order to create openings.

== Championships and accomplishments ==
=== Mixed martial arts ===
- Bellator MMA
  - Bellator Heavyweight Grand Prix Finalist
- PRIDE Fighting Championships
  - PRIDE Heavyweight Championship (One time; Last)
    - Three successful title defenses
  - PRIDE 2004 Heavyweight World Grand Prix Champion
  - Second longest undefeated streak in PRIDE FC history (15)
  - Third most submissions in PRIDE FC history (7)
- Fighting Network RINGS
  - RINGS Heavyweight Champion (One time; Last)
  - RINGS Openweight Championship (One time; Last)
  - RINGS 2001 Absolute Class Tournament Winner
  - RINGS 2001 Heavyweight Title Tournament Winner
- World Alliance of Mixed Martial Arts
  - WAMMA Heavyweight Championship (One time; First; Last)
  - Two successful title defenses
- Nikkan Sports
  - 2012 Mixed Martial Arts MVP
- ESPN
  - #6 Ranked Men's MMA Fighter of the 21st Century
- Sports Illustrated
  - 2000s Fighter of the Decade
  - 2000s Fight of the Decade vs. Mirko Cro Cop on 28 August 2005
  - 2009 Knockout of the Year vs. Andrei Arlovski on 24 January
- MMA Fighting
  - 2000s Fighter of the Decade
  - 2009 #2 Ranked Fighter of the Year
  - 2005 Fight of the Year vs. Mirko Cro Cop on 28 August 2005
  - 2005 Heavyweight of the Year
  - 2004 Heavyweight of the Year
  - 2003 Heavyweight of the Year
- FIGHT! Magazine
  - 2000s Fighter of the Decade
- FanSided
  - 2000s #3 Ranked MMA Fighter of the Decade
- Combat Press
  - 2018 Comeback Fighter of the Year
- ValeTudo.ru
  - 2000s Fighter of the Decade
- Bleacher Report
  - Mixed Martial Arts Hall of Fame
  - 2000s Fighter of the Decade
  - 2000s Heavyweight of the Decade
- About.com
  - 2000s Fighter of the Decade
- Yahoo! Sports
  - 2000s Fight of the Decade vs. Mirko Cro Cop on 28 August 2005
- Sherdog
  - 2009 Knockout of the Year vs. Andrei Arlovski on 24 January
  - 2000s Fighter of the Decade
  - Mixed Martial Arts Hall of Fame
- Inside MMA
  - 2009 KO Punch of the Year Bazzie Award vs. Andrei Arlovski on 24 January
- CagePotato
  - 2009 Fighter of the Year
  - 2008 Beatdown of the Year vs. Tim Sylvia on 19 July
- Wrestling Observer Newsletter
  - 2005 Most Outstanding Fighter
- Black Belt Magazine
  - 2004 NHB Fighter of the Year
- Fight Matrix
  - 2005 Most Noteworthy Match of the Year vs. Mirko Cro Cop on 28 August
  - 2004 Most Noteworthy Match of the Year vs. Antônio Rodrigo Nogueira on 31 December
  - 2003 Most Noteworthy Match of the Year vs. Antônio Rodrigo Nogueira on 16 March
  - 2003 Fighter of the Year

=== Sambo ===
- SportAccord
  - 2013 SportAccord World Combat Games Sambo Ambassador
  - 2010 SportAccord World Combat Games Sambo Ambassador
- Fédération Internationale Amateur de Sambo
  - FIAS Hall of Fame
  - 2008 FIAS World Combat Sambo Championships Bronze Medalist
  - 2007 FIAS World Combat Sambo Championships Gold Medalist
  - 2005 FIAS World Combat Sambo Championships Gold Medalist
  - 2002 FIAS World Combat Sambo Championships Gold Medalist
- World Combat Sambo Federation
  - 2002 WCSF World Combat Sambo Championships Gold Medalist
- European Combat Sambo Federation
  - 1999 European Combat Sambo Championships Gold Medalist
- All-Russia Sambo Federation
  - Russian Combat Sambo National Championship (2002, 2005, 2007, 2008, 2009, 2012)
  - 2008 President's Cup Combat Sambo Gold Medalist
- Combat Sambo Federation of Russia
  - Russian Combat Sambo National Championship 3rd Place (1998, 2000)
  - 2004 Dagestan Open Combat Sambo Gold Medalist
  - 2003 Union of Heroes Cup Combat Sambo Gold Medalist
  - 2003 Moscow Open Combat Sambo Gold Medalist
  - 1998 Russian Armed Forces Championships Absolute Silver Medalist
  - 1998 Russian Armed Forces Championships Gold Medalist
- Federal Executive Body in the Field of Physical Culture & Sports
  - Honored Master of Sport (2006)
  - International Master of Sport (1998)
  - Master of Sport (1997)

=== Judo ===
- International Judo Federation
  - 1999 Sofia Liberation A-Team Senior Bronze Medalist
  - 1999 Moscow International Tournament Senior Bronze Medalist
- Russian Judo Federation
  - Russian National Championship Senior Absolute 3rd Place (1999)
  - Russian National Championship Senior 3rd Place (1998)
- Federal Executive Body in the Field of Physical Culture & Sports
  - International Master of Sport (2000)
  - Master of Sport (1997)

=== Miscellaneous ===
- All-Russian Center for the Study of Public Opinion
  - 2009 Russian Male Athlete of the Year
- International Olympic Committee
  - 2014 Winter Olympics Belgorod Torchbearer
  - 2008 Summer Olympics Russian Torchbearer
- National Sports Award "Glory"
  - 2007 Fair Play Glory Award
- Russian Union of Martial Arts
  - 2006 Most Outstanding Victory of the Year Golden Belt Award
- Imperial Society of Russia
  - First Class Golden Order of the Romanov Family of St. Nicholas II (2010)
- Russian Federation National State Decorations Committee
  - First Class Order of Peter the Great (2007)
  - Second Class Order For Merit to the Fatherland (2007)

== Mixed martial arts record ==
Professional record breakdown
48 matches	40 wins	7 losses
By knockout	16	6
By submission	15	1
By decision	9	0
No contests	1	

Res.	Record	Opponent	Method	Event	Date	Round	Time	Location	Notes
Loss	40–7 (1)	Ryan Bader	TKO (punches)	Bellator 290	4 February 2023	1	2:30	Inglewood, California, United States	For the Bellator Heavyweight World Championship.
Win	40–6 (1)	Timothy Johnson	KO (punches)	Bellator 269	23 October 2021	1	1:46	Moscow, Russia	
Win	39–6 (1)	Quinton Jackson	TKO (punches)	Bellator 237	29 December 2019	1	2:44	Saitama, Japan	
Loss	38–6 (1)	Ryan Bader	TKO (punches)	Bellator 214	26 January 2019	1	0:35	Inglewood, California, United States	Bellator Heavyweight World Grand Prix Final. For the vacant Bellator Heavyweight World Championship.
Win	38–5 (1)	Chael Sonnen	TKO (punches)	Bellator 208	13 October 2018	1	4:46	Uniondale, New York, United States	Bellator Heavyweight World Grand Prix Semifinal.
Win	37–5 (1)	Frank Mir	KO (punches)	Bellator 198	28 April 2018	1	0:48	Rosemont, Illinois, United States	Bellator Heavyweight World Grand Prix Quarterfinal.
Loss	36–5 (1)	Matt Mitrione	TKO (punches)	Bellator NYC	24 June 2017	1	1:14	New York City, New York, United States	
Win	36–4 (1)	Fábio Maldonado	Decision (majority)	Fight Nights Global 50	17 June 2016	3	5:00	Saint Petersburg, Russia	Result unofficially ruled a Draw by the World Mixed Martial Arts Association; however, that decision has not been recognized by the Russian MMA Union.
Win	35–4 (1)	Jaideep Singh	TKO (submission to punches)	Rizin World Grand Prix 2015: Part 2 - Iza	31 December 2015	1	3:02	Saitama, Japan	
Win	34–4 (1)	Pedro Rizzo	KO (punches)	M-1 Global: Fedor vs. Rizzo	21 June 2012	1	1:24	Saint Petersburg, Russia	
Win	33–4 (1)	Satoshi Ishii	KO (punches)	Fight For Japan: Genki Desu Ka Omisoka 2011	31 December 2011	1	2:29	Saitama, Japan	
Win	32–4 (1)	Jeff Monson	Decision (unanimous)	M-1 Global: Fedor vs. Monson	20 November 2011	3	5:00	Moscow, Russia	
Loss	31–4 (1)	Dan Henderson	TKO (punches)	Strikeforce: Fedor vs. Henderson	30 July 2011	1	4:12	Hoffman Estates, Illinois, United States	
Loss	31–3 (1)	Antônio Silva	TKO (doctor stoppage)	Strikeforce: Fedor vs. Silva	12 February 2011	2	5:00	East Rutherford, New Jersey, United States	Strikeforce Heavyweight Grand Prix Quarterfinal.
Loss	31–2 (1)	Fabrício Werdum	Submission (triangle armbar)	Strikeforce: Fedor vs. Werdum	26 June 2010	1	1:09	San Jose, California, United States	
Win	31–1 (1)	Brett Rogers	TKO (punches)	Strikeforce: Fedor vs. Rogers	7 November 2009	2	1:48	Hoffman Estates, Illinois, United States	Defended the WAMMA Heavyweight Championship.
Win	30–1 (1)	Andrei Arlovski	KO (punch)	Affliction: Day of Reckoning	24 January 2009	1	3:14	Anaheim, California, United States	Defended WAMMA Heavyweight Championship.
Win	29–1 (1)	Tim Sylvia	Submission (rear-naked choke)	Affliction: Banned	19 July 2008	1	0:36	Anaheim, California, United States	Won the inaugural WAMMA Heavyweight Championship.
Win	28–1 (1)	Choi Hong-man	Submission (armbar)	Yarennoka!	31 December 2007	1	1:54	Saitama, Japan	Super Heavyweight bout.
Win	27–1 (1)	Matt Lindland	Submission (armbar)	Bodog Fight: Clash of the Nations 2007	14 April 2007	1	2:58	Saint Petersburg, Russia	
Win	26–1 (1)	Mark Hunt	Submission (kimura)	Pride Shockwave 2006	31 December 2006	1	8:16	Saitama, Japan	Defended the PRIDE Heavyweight Championship.
Win	25–1 (1)	Mark Coleman	Submission (armbar)	Pride 32	21 October 2006	2	1:17	Las Vegas, Nevada, United States	
Win	24–1 (1)	Zuluzinho	TKO (submission to punches)	Pride Shockwave 2005	31 December 2005	1	0:26	Saitama, Japan	
Win	23–1 (1)	Mirko Cro Cop	Decision (unanimous)	Pride Final Conflict 2005	28 August 2005	3	5:00	Saitama, Japan	Defended the PRIDE Heavyweight Championship.
Win	22–1 (1)	Tsuyoshi Kohsaka	TKO (doctor stoppage)	Pride Bushido 6	3 April 2005	1	10:00	Yokohama, Japan	
Win	21–1 (1)	Antônio Rodrigo Nogueira	Decision (unanimous)	Pride Shockwave 2004	31 December 2004	3	5:00	Saitama, Japan	Defended and unified the PRIDE Heavyweight Championship. Won the 2004 PRIDE Heavyweight Grand Prix.
NC	20–1 (1)	Antônio Rodrigo Nogueira	NC (accidental clash of heads)	Pride Final Conflict 2004	15 August 2004	1	3:52	Saitama, Japan	Retained the PRIDE Heavyweight Championship. 2004 PRIDE Heavyweight Grand Prix Final. Accidental clash of heads rendered Emelianenko unable to continue.
Win	20–1	Naoya Ogawa	Submission (armbar)	Pride Final Conflict 2004	15 August 2004	1	0:54	Saitama, Japan	2004 PRIDE Heavyweight Grand Prix Semifinal.
Win	19–1	Kevin Randleman	Submission (kimura)	Pride Critical Countdown 2004	20 June 2004	1	1:33	Saitama, Japan	2004 PRIDE Heavyweight Grand Prix Quarterfinal.
Win	18–1	Mark Coleman	Submission (armbar)	Pride Total Elimination 2004	25 April 2004	1	2:11	Saitama, Japan	2004 PRIDE Heavyweight Grand Prix First round.
Win	17–1	Yuji Nagata	TKO (punches)	Inoki Bom-Ba-Ye 2003	31 December 2003	1	1:02	Kobe, Japan	
Win	16–1	Gary Goodridge	TKO (soccer kicks and punches)	Pride Total Elimination 2003	10 August 2003	1	1:09	Saitama, Japan	
Win	15–1	Kazuyuki Fujita	Submission (rear-naked choke)	Pride 26	8 June 2003	1	4:17	Tokyo, Japan	
Win	14–1	Egidijus Valavicius	Submission (kimura)	Rings Lithuania: Bushido Rings 7: Adrenalinas	5 April 2003	2	1:11	Vilnius, Lithuania	
Win	13–1	Antônio Rodrigo Nogueira	Decision (unanimous)	Pride 25	16 March 2003	3	5:00	Yokohama, Japan	Won the PRIDE Heavyweight Championship.
Win	12–1	Heath Herring	TKO (doctor stoppage)	Pride 23	24 November 2002	1	10:00	Tokyo, Japan	
Win	11–1	Semmy Schilt	Decision (unanimous)	Pride 21	23 June 2002	3	5:00	Saitama, Japan	
Win	10–1	Chris Haseman	TKO (punches)	Rings Japan: World Title Series Grand Final	15 February 2002	1	2:50	Yokohama, Japan	Won the 2001 Rings Absolute Class Tournament.
Win	9–1	Lee Hasdell	Submission (kimura)	Rings Japan: World Title Series 5	21 December 2001	1	4:10	Yokohama, Japan	2001 Rings Absolute Class Tournament Semifinal.
Win	8–1	Ryushi Yanagisawa	Decision (unanimous)	Rings Japan: World Title Series 4	20 October 2001	3	5:00	Tokyo, Japan	2001 RINGS Absolute Class Tournament Quarterfinal.
Win	7–1	Renato Sobral	Decision (unanimous)	Rings: 10th Anniversary	11 August 2001	2	5:00	Tokyo, Japan	Won the 2001 Rings Openweight Tournament.
Win	6–1	Kerry Schall	Submission (armbar)	Rings Japan: World Title Series 1	20 April 2001	1	1:47	Tokyo, Japan	2001 Rings Openweight Tournament Semifinal.
Win	5–1	Mihail Apostolov	Submission (rear-naked choke)	Rings Russia: Russia vs. Bulgaria 2	6 April 2001	1	1:03	Yekaterinburg, Russia	
Loss	4–1	Tsuyoshi Kohsaka	TKO (doctor stoppage)	Rings: King of Kings 2000 Block B	22 December 2000	1	0:17	Osaka, Japan	2000 Rings Heavyweight Tournament 2nd Round.
Win	4–0	Ricardo Arona	Decision (unanimous)	Rings: King of Kings 2000 Block B	22 December 2000	3	5:00	Osaka, Japan	2000 Rings Heavyweight Tournament Opening round.
Win	3–0	Hiroya Takada	KO (punches)	Rings Japan: Battle Genesis 6	5 September 2000	1	0:12	Tokyo, Japan	
Win	2–0	Levon Lagvilava	Submission (rear-naked choke)	Rings: Russia vs. Georgia	16 August 2000	1	7:24	Tula, Russia	
Win	1–0	Martin Lazarov	Submission (guillotine choke)	Rings Russia: Russia vs. Bulgaria	21 May 2000	1	2:24	Yekaterinburg, Russia	Heavyweight debut.

== Political career ==
Towards the end of his mixed martial arts career, Emelianenko entered politics. He was elected to a five-year term as a deputy of the Belgorod Regional Duma on 10 October 2010 under the United Russia political party.

On 28 July 2012, Emelianenko replaced Russian prime minister Dmitry Medvedev as a staff member of Russia's Council of Physical Fitness & Sports. The corresponding decree was signed by Russian president Vladimir Putin.

In 2014, Emelianenko expressed support of the annexation of Crimea by the Russian Federation, and commented on the choice of the majority of the Crimean population to become a part of Russia in the 2014 Crimean status referendum: "Crimea has made the right choice, by joining Russia." He travelled to Crimea in order to promote MMA in the peninsula.

As for the Donbas war, Emelianenko accused Ukraine of waging a war against its own people, accused the Ukrainian government of fascism, and of "murdering Russians simply for being Russian."

== Personal life ==
In 1999, two years after his army service, he married Oksana, whom he had known since school, and their daughter was born in the same year. They divorced in 2006. On 29 December 2007, his second daughter was born to his long-time girlfriend Marina. Emelianenko and Marina married in October 2009. In his spare time, he likes to read, listen to music, and draw. in July 2011 their second daughter was born. He is a practicing Orthodox Christian and a parishioner at the church of St. Nicholas in Stary Oskol. His entrance theme song, oy, to ne vecher, was performed at his request by archdeacon Andrey Zheleznyakov, soloist at the Episcopal Choir of the Nizhny Novgorod Diocese. In February 2014, Emelianenko remarried his first wife.

According to many people who have had close contact with Emelianenko, he is a humble man.

Emelianenko has stated his driving force for winning fights was: "Years ago we hardly had anything to eat. Now I earn more money and I see every opponent as a man that tries to put me back to that poorer period. That man has to be eliminated." and about his state of mind before a fight: "When I walk into a fight, I'm trying not to think about anything; collect myself and concentrate. And going into a fight, I don't feel any emotions, neither anger nor compassion. I don't emotionalize. I'm going into a fight with a clear mind... During the fight, my senses dim and basically I don't feel any pain."

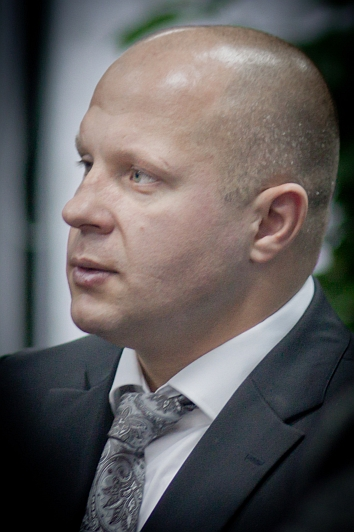
Emelianenko at the Nippon Budokan in 2012

In Fighters Only magazine, a sports psychologist was quoted as saying, "The best when it comes to the stare down is Fedor Emelianenko. Watch him: he does not make eye contact and his entire expression is extremely relaxed – you would think he is about to perform a ballet or something. But here is the crucial thing. When the referee tells them to head back to their corners, Fedor suddenly darts a short look directly at his opponent – or through his opponent, I should say. This kind of look is associated with antisocial behavioral disorders and psychopaths. They don't look at you, they look through you. It's emotionless; it goes deeper than skin level. You will get a lot of fighters who will catch that look and suddenly realize they don't want to be there. Wanderlei Silva has a stare-down that makes you think 'this is gonna hurt', but Fedor's makes you think 'I might die'."

Fedor trains with his youngest brother Ivan, who has competed in Combat Sambo.

Emelianenko was one of 80 Russian sports champions, cultural icons and national heroes to carry the Olympic torch in St. Petersburg in 2008.

When asked about his ethnicity in 2018, Fedor Emelianenko (who was born in Ukraine) said he was of Russian ethnicity, but that he "doesn't divide our countries." He said that Russia and Ukraine are "two different states," but that for him they were "still the same country."

On 21 January 2021, Emelianenko was hospitalised in Moscow after contracting COVID-19. On 27 January, it was revealed that Emelianenko was released from the hospital.

== Filmography ==
=== Film ===
Year	Title	Role	Notes
2009	Fedor: The Baddest Man on the Planet	Himself	Documentary Biography
2009	CNBC Originals: Ultimate Fighting: Fistful of Dollars	Himself	Archive footage
2010	The 5th Execution	Fedor	
2011	New York Mixed Martial Arts	Himself	Cameo; Documentary

=== Television ===
Year	Title	Role	Notes
2006	무한도전 (Infinite Challenge)	Himself	Guest; Season 04; Episode 18 & 19: "Wrestling Challenges Parts 1 & 2"
2007	Human Weapon	Himself	Cameo; Season 01; Episode 11: "Sambo"
2008	Inside MMA	Himself	Guest interview with Bas Rutten
2008	놀라운 대회 스타킹 (Starking)	Himself	Guest
2009	Sports Science	Himself	Guest; Season 02; Episode 01: "Choked and Slammed"
2009	Inside MMA	Himself	Bazzie Award for KO Punch of the Year
2012	놀라운 대회 스타킹 (Starking)	Himself	Guest; Sambo exhibition with Chan Sung Jung
2012	クイズ☆タレント名鑑 (Talent Directory Quiz)	Himself	Contestant; Ultimate Sumo Championship 2012
2013	世界行ってみたらホントはこんなトコだった!?	Himself	Cameo; Season 03; Episode 04: "Russia"
2013	ジャイアントキリング (Giant Killing)	Himself	Contestant; Sportsmen Arm-Wrestling World Finals
2014	The Voice Versus	Himself	Guest; Season 05; Episode 04: "The Voice Versus: Fedor"

=== Video games ===
Year	Title	Role
2003	PrideGP Grand Prix 2003	Playable Character
2010	EA Sports MMA	Playable Character; Cover Athlete

=== Advertising ===
Year	Title	Notes
2008	Affliction Clothing	International
2009	Snickers	South Korea
2011	Forward Sportswear	Russia
2012	Mercedes-Benz	Russia

== Bibliography ==
Author	Title	Year	Publisher	ISBN
Fedor Emelianenko, Glen Cordoza, Erich Krauss	Fedor: The Fighting System of the World's Undisputed King of MMA	2008	Victory Belt Publishing	9780977731541
Fedor Emelianenko, Vasily Shestakov, Svetlana Eregina	Sambo: The Science of Winning	2012	OLMA Media Group	9785373048637

== See also ==
- List of Bellator MMA alumni
- List of male mixed martial artists
- List of multi-sport athletes
- List of multi-sport champions
- List of Pride champions
- List of Pride FC alumni
- List of Strikeforce alumni

== Notes ==
Awards and achievements
New championship	1st WAMMA Heavyweight Champion; 19 July 2008 – 26 June 2010	WAMMA defunct
Preceded by Antônio Rodrigo Nogueira	2nd PRIDE Heavyweight Champion; 16 March 2003 – 4 October 2007	Pride FC defunct
New championship	1st RINGS Heavyweight Champion; 11 August 2001 – 15 February 2002	Title dissolved
Vacant Title last held by Gilbert Yvel	5th RINGS Openweight Champion; 15 February 2002 – 15 February 2002	Title dissolved
