= Paweł Deląg =

Polish actor (born 1970)

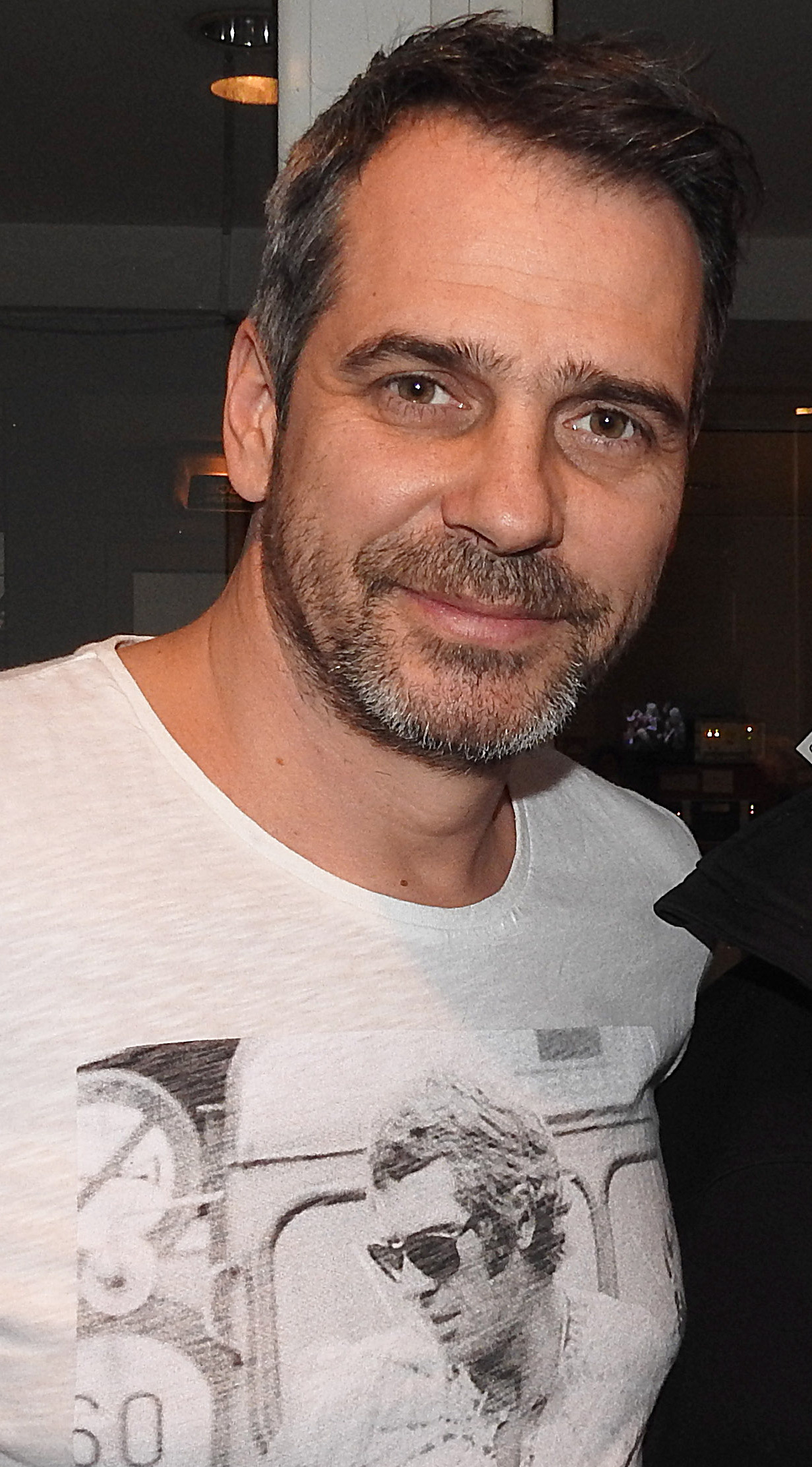
- Deląg in 2016
- Born: Paweł Maciej Deląg; 29 April 1970 (age 55); Kraków, Poland
- Other names: Paweł Delong
- Years active: 1993–present

Paweł Maciej Deląg (born 29 April 1970) is a Polish actor.

== Filmography ==
- Schindler's List (Lista Schindlera, 1993, USA) - Dolek Horowitz
- Death In Shallow Water (Halal sekely vizben, 1994, Hungary) - Peter
- Fitness Club (1995, TV Series)
- Young Wolves (Młode wilki, 1995, Poland)
- Sortez Des Rangs (1996, France)
- Szamanka (1996, France, Switzerland, Poland) - Jules
- Queen of Thieves (Królowa złodziei; French title: Marion du faouet,1997, TV Movie, France, Poland) - Prévost
- Killer (Kiler, 1997, Poland) - Camera Operator
- Young Wolves 1/2 (Młode Wilki 1/2) (1997) - Biedrona
- Sława i Chwala (1998, TV Mini-Series, Poland) - Niewolin
- Love and Do What You Want (Kochaj i rób co chcesz, 1998, Poland) - Darek
- Dark Side of Venus (Ciemna strona Wenus, 1998, Poland)
- Gold of Deserters (Złoto dezerterów, 1998, Poland)
- Life Like a Poker (Życie jak poker, 1998–1999, TV series)
- Siedlisko (1999, TV Series, Poland) - Jacek
- A Date with a Devil (1999)
- Palce lizać (TV Series, 1999)
- Tenderness and Lies (Czułość i kłamstwa, 1999, TV Series)
- Police Officers (Policjanci, 1999, TV Mini-Series) - Nyga
- Tiger's of Europe (Tygrysy Europy, 1999, TV Series) - Jacek Laskowski
- Boys Don't Cry (Chłopaki nie płaczą, 2000, Poland) - Jarek Psikuta
- Success (Sukces, 2000, TV Series)
- Quo Vadis (2001, USA, Poland) - Marcus Vinicius
- Fishing Season (Sezon na leszcza, 2001) - Kochany
- Hacker (Haker, 2002, Poland) - Daniel
- The Kowalski Brothers (2002)
- Let's Make Ourselves a Grandson (Zróbmy sobie wnuka, 2003, Poland) - Janek Kosela
- Boars (Dziki, 2004, TV Mini-Series, Poland) - Szwarc
- Les Femmes D'abord (2005, TV Movie, France) - Vutkovic
- Na dobre i na Złe (TV Series, 2006-2008, Poland) - Dr. Stanislaw Dzrzewiecki
- I'll Show You! (Ja wam pokażę!, 2006, Poland) - Adam
- How We Hated Each Other (Nous nous sommes tant haïs, 2007, TV Series) - Jürgen Köller
- The Mystery of the Secret Cipher (Tajemnica twierdzy szyfrów, 2007, TV series, Poland) - Howard Compaigne
- Criminals (Kryminalni, 2008, TV Series, Poland) - Grzegorz Niwinski
- House (2008, USA) - Officer Lawdale
- Put (2009) - (uncredited)
- The Magic Stone (2009, USA, Poland) - President
- The 5th Execution (Ключ Саламандры, 2011, USA, Russia, Netherlands) - Ivanych
- In your eyes (В твоих глазах, 2011, TV Series, Russia)
- Marry a general (Выйти замуж за генерала, 2011, TV Series, Russia)
- Marriage under the will 2. Sandra's comeback (Брак по завещанию 2. Bозвращение Сандры, 2011, TV Series, Russia)
- Two (Двое, 2011, Russia)
- Second Love (Вторая любовь, 2011, Russia)
- German (Немец, 2011, TV Series, Belarus)
- The Destiny of Rome (2011, TV Series, France) - Marc Antoine
- Komisarz Blond i Oko sprawiedliwości (2012) - Marek
- 1812. Ulanskaya ballada (2012) - Ledokhovskiy
- Viking (2016) - Anastas
- "Отель последней надежды" (2016) -Oficer ang. sluzby bezpieczenstwa Den Walsh
- Vsetko alebo nic (2017) - Bystrican
- Gwiazdy (2017) - Hans Villmeier
- Coffee with Cardamom (2021) - Count Adam Rodzinsky

== Personal life ==
He dated Polish model Bogna Sworowska in the late 1990s.

== Sources ==
- https://web.archive.org/web/20060721160913/http://film.onet.pl/3403,1,osoba.html (in Polish)
- https://web.archive.org/web/20040708073155/http://www.lecinema.pl/lk/gw091710.php (in Polish)
- Paweł Deląg at IMDb
