= Olena Lavrenyuk =

Ukrainian media personality

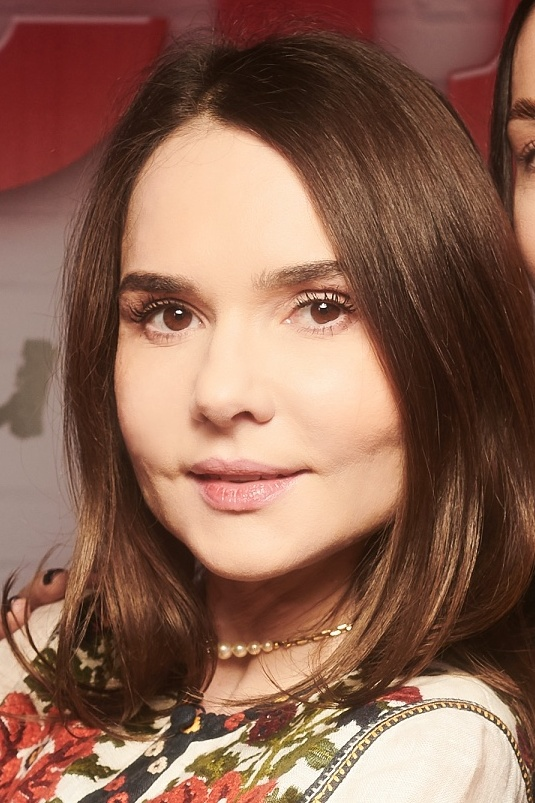
- Lavreniuk at a film pre-premiere in 2022
- Born: Олена Гірняк; 18 December 1982 (age 43); Lviv, Ukraine
- Occupation: actress
- Spouse: Serhiy Lavrenyuk
- Children: 2

Olena Lavrenyuk (Ukrainian: Олена Лавренюк, née Hirnyak; born 18 December 1982) is a Ukrainian actress.

== Biography ==
Lavrenyuk was born on 18 December 1982 in Lviv. After graduating from secondary school # 53 in Lviv, she went to the capital Kyiv, where she studied at the Kyiv National I. K. Karpenko-Kary Theatre, Cinema and Television University.

Lavrenyuk was the host of the weather on the TVi channel. She made her film debut in the film "13 Months" (2008). Among her other works in cinema, roles in films such as Synevyr (2012), "Ordering for One" (2012), "Alien" (2012) and others. The popularity of the actress came after her starring role in the film “DZIDZIO: Double Bass”.

Lavrenyuk has also gained some notoriety for starring in the 2021 TV series Coffee with Cardamom.

== Personal life ==
Lavrenyuk is married to film producer Serhiy Lavrenyuk and they have two daughters. She currently lives in Kyiv.
