= Bogna Sworowska =

Polish model

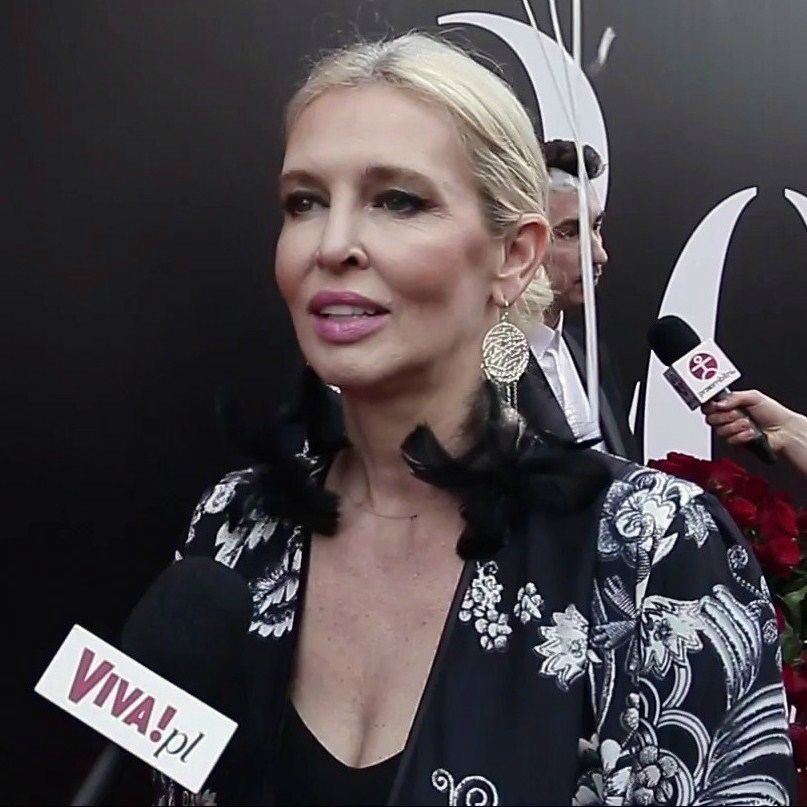
- Born: Bogna Sworowska; May 10, 1967 (age 58); Warsaw, Poland
- Occupations: Beauty queen, model, spokesperson
- Known for: Being 2nd Runner Up in Miss Polonia 1987 and being on the cover of Playboy

Bogna Sworowska (born May 10, 1967), was the 2nd runner-up at Miss Polonia 1987, was a Playboy cover model in 1990 and is a spokesperson for the TVN television station.

== Information ==
Sworowska began modelling at the age of 16, signing with the Moda Polska fashion company and by 1983, was performing in fashion shows in Milan, Italy. She decided to participate in the 1987 Miss Polonia contest. She did well in the preliminaries and won the titles of Miss Województwa (Miss Province) and Miss Publiczności (Miss Audience). She then won Miss Pomorza Zachodniego (Miss West Pomerania). In 1987 Miss Polonia competition, she won the 2nd Runner Up award and won Miss Foto.

For winning the Miss Foto award, she won a trip to the United States, where she began modelling. In February 1990, she appeared on the cover of Playboy magazine. She became the first and only Polish woman to do this. She later claimed that she thought she was just doing test photos and had no idea that she would be on the cover. She became involved with a Russian businessman who has only been publicly identified as, "Sergei". They became engaged and one month before their wedding in 1994, assailants broke into their apartment and shot Sergei. Sworowska was questioned by police over the incident and was advised to go into hiding and change her identity. Trauma over the incident caused her to retire from modelling and suffer for several years. The murder remains unsolved as of 2023.

She started up a public relations agency in 1998 and was hired by TVN, a polish television station as a spokesperson. She briefly dated polish actor, Paweł Deląg in the late 90's. In 2004, she gave birth to a son named Ivan and currently, she is dating a polish artist named Rafał Olbiński. She is an ambassador for the medical cosmetic brand, Obagi.

== In popular culture ==
Sworowska appeared in the music video for the song, "Na Twojej orbicie" by the artist, "Mad Money". She appeared on an episode of Top Chef in 2013.
