= Hiroya Takada =

Japanese mixed martial arts fighter

- Born: August 16, 1977 (age 49); Ibaraki Prefecture, Japan
- Nationality: Japanese
- Height: 5 ft 10 in (1.78 m)
- Weight: 216 lb (98 kg; 15 st 6 lb)
- Division: Heavyweight (265 lb)
- Fighting out of: Ibaraki Prefecture, Japan
- Years active: 2000 - 2002 (MMA)

Mixed martial arts record
- Total: 4
- Wins: 1
- By decision: 1
- Losses: 3
- By knockout: 1
- By submission: 1
- By decision: 1

Other information
- Mixed martial arts record from Sherdog

Hiroya Takada (born August 16, 1977) is a Japanese mixed martial artist who competed in the Heavyweight division. In wrestling he won three stages in 2012. In 1998 he was All-Japan Junior Olympic Games 83 kg class winner and in 1999 he was All Japan Student Wrestling 97 kg class tournament runner. In 1999 he won the Kanto human society tournament 97 kg class.

He competed in the Rings Battle Genesis vol.6 in 2000 and Kontendazu in July 2000. He also competed in Abu Dhabi in January 2000.

== Mixed martial arts record ==
Professional record breakdown
4 matches	1 win	3 losses
By knockout	0	1
By submission	0	1
By decision	1	1

Res.	Record	Opponent	Method	Event	Date	Round	Time	Location	Notes
Loss	1–3	Katsuhisa Fujii	Decision (majority)	Pancrase: 2002 Anniversary Show	September 29, 2002	3	5:00	Yokohama, Japan	
Win	1–2	Takao Yamamoto	Decision (Unanimous)	Pancrase: Spirit 3	March 25, 2002	2	5:00	Tokyo, Japan	
Loss	0–2	Kazuo Takahashi	Submission (guillotine choke)	Pancrase - 2001 Anniversary Show	September 30, 2001	2	0:22	Kanagawa, Japan	First round heavyweight tournament.
Loss	0–1	Fedor Emelianenko	KO (Punches)	Rings: Battle Genesis Vol. 6	September 5, 2000	1	0:12	Tokyo, Tokyo, Japan	
