= 2002 in Pancrase =

Mixed martial arts events

Information
- First date: January 27, 2002
- Last date: December 21, 2002

Events
- Total events: 12

Fights
- Total fights: 99
- Title fights: 3

Chronology
2001 in Pancrase	2002 in Pancrase	2003 in Pancrase

The year 2002 was the tenth year in the history of Pancrase, a mixed martial arts promotion based in Japan. In 2002 Pancrase held 12 events beginning with Pancrase: Spirit 1.

== Title fights ==
Title fights in 2002
Weight class				Method	Round	Time	Event	Notes
Welterweight	Kiuma Kunioku	def.	Takafumi Ito	Submission (Armbar)	1	4:59	Pancrase: 2002 Neo-Blood Tournament Second Round	(Note: For the Pancrase Welterweight Championship.)
Welterweight	Kiuma Kunioku (c)	def.	Hiroki Nagaoka	Submission (Rear-Naked Choke)	3	4:36	Pancrase: 2002 Anniversary Show	(Note: For the Pancrase Welterweight Championship.)
Middleweight	Nate Marquardt (c)	def.	Kiuma Kunioku	KO (Flying Knee)	3	4:36	Pancrase: Spirit 9	(Note: For the Pancrase Middleweight Championship.)

== Events list ==
#	Event title	Date	Arena	Location
118	Pancrase: Spirit 9	December 21, 2002	Korakuen Hall	Tokyo, Japan
117	Pancrase: Spirit 8	November 30, 2002	Yokohama Cultural Gymnasium	Yokohama, Kanagawa, Japan
116	Pancrase: Spirit 7	October 29, 2002	Korakuen Hall	Tokyo, Japan
115	Pancrase: 2002 Anniversary Show	September 29, 2002	Yokohama Cultural Gymnasium	Yokohama, Kanagawa, Japan
114	Pancrase: Spirit 6	August 25, 2002	Umeda Stella Hall	Osaka, Osaka, Japan
113	Pancrase: 2002 Neo-Blood Tournament Second Round	July 28, 2002	Korakuen Hall	Tokyo, Japan
112	Pancrase: 2002 Neo-Blood Tournament Opening Round	July 28, 2002	Korakuen Hall	Tokyo, Japan
111	Pancrase: Spirit 5	May 28, 2002	Korakuen Hall	Tokyo, Japan
110	Pancrase: Spirit 4	May 11, 2002	Umeda Stella Hall	Osaka, Osaka, Japan
109	Pancrase: Spirit 3	March 25, 2002	Korakuen Hall	Tokyo, Japan
108	Pancrase: Spirit 2	February 17, 2002	Umeda Stella Hall	Osaka, Osaka, Japan
107	Pancrase: Spirit 1	January 27, 2002	Korakuen Hall	Tokyo, Japan

== Pancrase: Spirit 1 ==
Pancrase: Spirit 1
- Date: January 27, 2002
- Venue: Korakuen Hall
- City: Tokyo, Japan

Pancrase: Spirit 1 was an event held on January 27, 2002, at Korakuen Hall in Tokyo, Japan.

=== Results ===
Main Card
Weight class				Method	Round	Time	Notes
	Yuki Kondo	def.	Mitsuyoshi Sato	TKO (Punches)	2	0:32
	Yuki Sasaki	def.	Keiichiro Yamamiya	Submission (Armbar)	1	4:29
	Daisuke Ishii	def.	Kenji Akiyama	TKO (Punches)	2	3:01
	Osami Shibuya	def.	Yuji Hisamatsu	Submission (Heel Hook)	2	0:46

== Pancrase: Spirit 2 ==
Pancrase: Spirit 2
- Date: February 17, 2002
- Venue: Umeda Stella Hall
- City: Osaka, Osaka, Japan

Pancrase: Spirit 2 was an event held on February 17, 2002, at Umeda Stella Hall in Osaka, Osaka, Japan.

=== Results ===
Main Card
Weight class				Method	Round	Time	Notes
	Yuki Kondo	def.	Eiji Ishikawa	Decision (Unanimous)	2	5:00
	Kazuo Misaki	def.	Ryuki Ueyama	Decision (Unanimous)	3	5:00
	Kosei Kubota	vs.	Daisuke Watanabe	Draw (Unanimous)	3	5:00
	Hikaru Sato	def.	Kazuki Okubo	Decision (Majority)	2	5:00
	Kenji Arai	def.	Takaku Fuke	TKO (Doctor Stoppage)	1	3:28
	Hideo Tokoro	def.	Miki Shida	Draw (Time Limit)	2	5:00

== Pancrase: Spirit 3 ==
Pancrase: Spirit 3
- Date: March 25, 2002
- Venue: Korakuen Hall
- City: Tokyo, Japan

Pancrase: Spirit 3 was an event held on March 25, 2002, at Korakuen Hall in Tokyo, Japan.

=== Results ===
Main Card
Weight class				Method	Round	Time	Notes
	Yoshinori Momose	vs.	Ikuhisa Minowa	Draw (Majority)	2	5:00
	Takafumi Ito	def.	Taro Minato	Decision (Unanimous)	2	5:00
	Nate Marquardt	def.	Kazuo Misaki	TKO (Elbow Dislocation)	1	0:29
	Eiji Ishikawa	def.	Daisuke Ishii	Decision (Unanimous)	2	5:00
	Koji Oishi	def.	Satoru Kitaoka	Decision (Majority)	2	5:00
	Keiichiro Yamamiya	def.	Sumio Koyano	KO (Punch)	1	0:31
	Hiroya Takada	def.	Takao Yamamoto	Decision (Unanimous)	2	5:00
	Masahito Wachi	def.	Hideaki Hirayama	KO (Spinning Back Fist)	1	0:13
	Takahito Iida	vs.	Minoru Ozawa	Draw (Time Limit)	2	5:00

== Pancrase: Spirit 4 ==
Pancrase: Spirit 4
- Date: May 11, 2002
- Venue: Umeda Stella Hall
- City: Osaka, Osaka, Japan

Pancrase: Spirit 4 was an event held on May 11, 2002, at Umeda Stella Hall in Osaka, Osaka, Japan.

=== Results ===
Main Card
Weight class				Method	Round	Time	Notes
	Akihiro Gono	def.	Kosei Kubota	Decision (Unanimous)	3	5:00
	Eiji Ishikawa	def.	Osami Shibuya	Decision (Majority)	2	5:00
	Kengo Watanabe	def.	Tomohiko Hashimoto	TKO (Punches)	1	4:17
	Keiichiro Yamamiya	def.	Ichiro Kanai	TKO (Punches)	1	3:51
	Satoru Kitaoka	def.	Kenji Arai	Decision (Majority)	2	5:00
	Hikaru Sato	def.	Takaku Fuke	Decision (Majority)	2	5:00
	Dokonjonosuke Mishima	def.	Masao Ando	Submission (Triangle Choke)	2	2:22
	Yoshiro Maeda	vs.	Mikio Takeuchi	Draw (Time Limit)	2	5:00

== Pancrase: Spirit 5 ==
Pancrase: Spirit 5
- Date: May 28, 2002
- Venue: Korakuen Hall
- City: Tokyo, Japan

Pancrase: Spirit 5 was an event held on May 28, 2002, at Korakuen Hall in Tokyo, Japan.

=== Results ===
Main Card
Weight class				Method	Round	Time	Notes
	Mitsuyoshi Sato	def.	Ikuhisa Minowa	Decision (Majority)	3	5:00
	Yuki Sasaki	def.	John Glover	Submission (Armbar)	2	1:19
	Takumi Yano	def.	Kenichi Sato	Submission (Triangle Choke)	2	0:55
	Kiuma Kunioku	def.	Hideaki Iwasaki	Decision (Unanimous)	2	5:00
	Koji Oishi	def.	Yoshimitsu Warita	Decision (Majority)	2	5:00
	Hiroki Nagaoka	def.	Yohei Ota	Decision (Unanimous)	2	5:00
	Jason Godsey	def.	Hideki Tadao	Submission (Rear-Naked Choke)	1	1:37
	Satoshi Nishino	vs.	Hirotaka Tomiyama	Draw (Time Limit)	2	5:00
	Yuji Oba	def.	Nariatsu Iwasaki	Submission (Ankle Lock)	1	3:58

== Pancrase: 2002 Neo-Blood Tournament Opening Round ==
Pancrase: 2002 Neo-Blood Tournament Opening Round
- Date: July 28, 2002
- Venue: Korakuen Hall
- City: Tokyo, Japan

Pancrase: 2002 Neo-Blood Tournament Opening Round was an event held on July 28, 2002, at Korakuen Hall in Tokyo, Japan.

=== Results ===
Main Card
Weight class				Method	Round	Time	Notes
	Yuki Kondo	def.	Yoshinori Momose	Submission (Punches)	2	3:51
	Kengo Watanabe	def.	Terrance Crampton	Submission (Straight Armbar)	1	2:31
	Kiuma Kunioku	def.	Koji Oishi	Decision (Unanimous)	3	5:00
	Takafumi Ito	def.	Hiroki Nagaoka	Decision (Unanimous)	2	5:00
	Masashi Suzuki	def.	Sen Nakadai	KO (Punch)	2	1:03
	Hidetaka Monma	def.	Kazuki Okubo	Decision (Split)	3	5:00
	Kenji Arai	def.	Minoru Ozawa	KO (Head Kick)	1	0:09
	Satoru Kitaoka	def.	Hiroyuki Nozawa	Decision (Unanimous)	2	5:00
	Yohei Tagami	def.	Taku Aramaki	Technical Submission (Armbar)	1	4:24

== Pancrase: 2002 Neo-Blood Tournament Second Round ==
Pancrase: 2002 Neo-Blood Tournament Second Round
- Date: July 28, 2002
- Venue: Korakuen Hall
- City: Tokyo, Japan

Pancrase: 2002 Neo-Blood Tournament Second Round was an event held on July 28, 2002, at Korakuen Hall in Tokyo, Japan.

=== Results ===
Main Card
Weight class				Method	Round	Time	Notes
Welterweight	Kiuma Kunioku	def.	Takafumi Ito	Submission (Armbar)	1	4:59	(Note: For the Pancrase Welterweight Championship.)
	Hidetaka Monma	def.	Satoru Kitaoka	KO (Knee)	1	0:05
	Keiichiro Yamamiya	def.	Mitsuyoshi Sato	TKO (Punches)	3	2:52
	Nate Marquardt	def.	Seiki Ryo	Technical Submission (Armbar)	1	1:37
	Daisuke Watanabe	def.	Takao Yamamoto	Decision (Majority)	3	5:00
	Mitsuhisa Sunabe	def.	Masahito Wachi	Decision (Split)	3	5:00
	Hidetaka Monma	def.	Masashi Suzuki	Submission (Triangle Armbar)	2	3:48
	Satoru Kitaoka	def.	Kenji Arai	Submission (Ankle Lock)	3	2:08
	Takahiro Sanehara	def.	Minoru Tsuiki	Submission (Kneebar)	1	0:19

== Pancrase: Spirit 6 ==
Pancrase: Spirit 6
- Date: August 25, 2002
- Venue: Umeda Stella Hall
- City: Osaka, Osaka, Japan

Pancrase: Spirit 6 was an event held on August 25, 2002, at Umeda Stella Hall in Osaka, Osaka, Japan.

=== Results ===
Main Card
Weight class				Method	Round	Time	Notes
	Akihiro Gono	vs.	Osami Shibuya	Draw (Unanimous)	3	5:00
	Kazuo Takahashi	def.	Hideki Tadao	Decision (Majority)	3	5:00
	Yuji Hoshino	vs.	Kosei Kubota	Draw (Majority)	3	5:00
	Kenichi Serizawa	def.	Takaku Fuke	Submission (Triangle Armbar)	2	2:41
	Yoshinobu Ota	vs.	Miki Shida	Draw (Unanimous)	2	5:00
	Kenji Takeshige	def.	Kenji Matsui	Draw	2	5:00
	Yasunori Yamada	vs.	Yoshiro Maeda	Draw (Time Limit)	2	5:00

== Pancrase: 2002 Anniversary Show ==
Pancrase: 2002 Anniversary Show
- Date: September 29, 2002
- Venue: Yokohama Cultural Gymnasium
- City: Yokohama, Kanagawa, Japan

Pancrase: 2002 Anniversary Show was an event held on September 29, 2002, at the Yokohama Cultural Gymnasium in Yokohama, Kanagawa, Japan.

=== Results ===
Main Card
Weight class				Method	Round	Time	Notes
Welterweight	Kiuma Kunioku (c)	def.	Hiroki Nagaoka	Submission (Rear-Naked Choke)	3	4:36	(Note: For the Pancrase Welterweight Championship.)
	Yuki Sasaki	def.	Alex Stiebling	Decision (Unanimous)	3	5:00
	Ron Waterman	def.	Kengo Watanabe	Technical Submission (Keylock)	1	2:33
	Keiichiro Yamamiya	def.	Eiji Ishikawa	Decision (Majority)	3	5:00
	Osami Shibuya	def.	Mitsuyoshi Sato	Decision (Unanimous)	3	5:00
	Kazuo Misaki	def.	Kosei Kubota	Decision (Unanimous)	3	5:00
	Katsuhisa Fujii	def.	Hiroya Takada	Decision (Majority)	3	5:00
	Masakazu Imanari	def.	Yuji Oba	Decision (Majority)	2	5:00
	Hirotaka Tomiyama	vs.	Tatsufumi Tsuchida	Draw (Time Limit)	2	5:00
	Masaki Tsuji	vs.	Makoto Kohira	Draw (Time Limit)	2	5:00

== Pancrase: Spirit 7 ==
Pancrase: Spirit 7
- Date: October 29, 2002
- Venue: Korakuen Hall
- City: Tokyo, Japan

Pancrase: Spirit 7 was an event held on October 29, 2002, at Korakuen Hall in Tokyo, Japan.

=== Results ===
Main Card
Weight class				Method	Round	Time	Notes
	Izuru Takeuchi	def.	Nate Marquardt	Decision (Unanimous)	3	5:00
	Chris Lytle	def.	Yuji Hoshino	Submission (Triangle Choke)	1	2:09
	Koji Oishi	def.	Juan Ayala	Decision (Unanimous)	3	5:00
	Satoru Kitaoka	def.	Taro Minato	Decision (Majority)	2	5:00
	Hikaru Sato	vs.	Susumu Yamasaki	Draw (Unanimous)	2	5:00
	Kenji Arai	def.	Takehiro Kato	Decision (Majority)	2	5:00
	Miki Shida	def.	Takahiro Sanehara	Decision (Unanimous)	2	5:00
	Hiroyuki Nozawa	def.	Minoru Ozawa	Decision (Unanimous)	2	5:00
	Tomoya Miyashita	vs.	Hideaki Hirayama	Draw (Time Limit)	2	5:00
	Hidehiko Hasegawa	def.	Hidenobu Koike	Draw (Time Limit)	2	5:00

== Pancrase: Spirit 8 ==
Pancrase: Spirit 8
- Date: November 30, 2002
- Venue: Yokohama Cultural Gymnasium
- City: Yokohama, Kanagawa, Japan

Pancrase: Spirit 8 was an event held on November 30, 2002, at the Yokohama Cultural Gymnasium in Yokohama, Kanagawa, Japan.

=== Results ===
Main Card
Weight class				Method	Round	Time	Notes
	Minoru Suzuki	def.	Jushin Thunder Liger	Submission (Rear-Naked Choke)	1	1:48
	Ikuhisa Minowa	def.	Yuki Sasaki	Decision (Majority)	3	5:00
	Sanae Kikuta	def.	Eduardo Pamplona	Decision (Unanimous)	3	5:00
	Ricardo Almeida	def.	Osami Shibuya	Submission (Rear-Naked Choke)	1	3:25
	Takafumi Ito	def.	Takuya Wada	Decision (Unanimous)	3	5:00
	Kazuo Misaki	def.	Masaya Kojima	Submission (Armbar)	1	4:40
	Mitsuhisa Sunabe	def.	Kunihiro Watanabe	Technical Submission (Guillotine Choke)	2	1:17
	Yushin Okami	def.	Sen Nakadai	Decision (Unanimous)	2	5:00
	Shinya Kumazawa	vs.	Hirotaka Toyama	Draw (Time Limit)	2	5:00

== Pancrase: Spirit 9 ==
Pancrase: Spirit 9
- Date: December 21, 2002
- Venue: Korakuen Hall
- City: Tokyo, Japan

Pancrase: Spirit 9 was an event held on December 21, 2002, at Korakuen Hall in Tokyo, Japan.

=== Results ===
Main Card
Weight class				Method	Round	Time	Notes
Middleweight	Nate Marquardt (c)	def.	Kiuma Kunioku	KO (Flying Knee)	3	4:36	(Note: For the Pancrase Middleweight Championship.)
	Izuru Takeuchi	def.	Chris Lytle	Decision (Majority)	3	5:00
	Akihiro Gono	def.	Keiichiro Yamamiya	TKO (Punches)	3	3:49
	Tsuyoshi Ozawa	def.	Kazuo Takahashi	Decision (Unanimous)	2	5:00
	Yuki Kondo	def.	Tsuyoshi Kurihara	Submission (Rear-Naked Choke)	1	4:49
	Jun Ishii	def.	Kengo Watanabe	Decision (Unanimous)	2	5:00
	Kenji Arai	def.	Manao Kumagai	Decision (Unanimous)	2	5:00
	Yuji Oba	def.	Satoshi Nishino	Decision (Unanimous)	2	5:00
	Shigeyuki Umeki	def.	Makoto Kohira	Submission (Kimura)	1	1:29

== See also ==
- Pancrase
- List of Pancrase champions
- List of Pancrase events
