= The 5th Execution =

2010 film

- Directed by: Aleksandr Yakimchuk, Elena Kovaleva
- Starring: Rutger Hauer; Fedor Emelianenko; Pawel Delag; Kim Bo-sung; Alexey Gorbunov; Valery Nikolaev; Valeriy Solovyov; Oleg Chernov
- Release date: December 14, 2010 (Ukraine)
- Running time: 110 minutes
- Country: Russia
- Languages: English, Russian, Korean

The 5th Execution (Russian: Ключ Саламандры) is a 2010 Russian adventure film directed by Aleksandr Yakimchuk and Elena Kovaleva.

== Cast ==
- Rutger Hauer as Khant
- Michael Madsen as Rik
- Fedor Emelianenko as himself
- Paweł Deląg as Ivan
- Kim Bo-sung as Chzhan Khen-Vu
- Alexey Gorbunov as General
- Valery Nikolaev as Sanya
- Valery Solovyov as Vadim
- Oleg Chernov as Tikhiy
