= Fédération Internationale de Sambo =

Organization

International SAMBO Federation
- International Federation of Amateur SAMBO
- Sport: SAMBO
- Jurisdiction: International
- Abbreviation: FIAS
- Founded: 1984
- Headquarters: Lausanne, Switzerland
- President: Vasily Shestakov (RUS)

Official website
- www.sambo.sport

International Federation of Amateur SAMBO (Fédération Internationale de SAMBO) is the world governing body for the sport of Sambo.

== History ==
1984 - the FILA Assembly decided to create an independent federation of SAMBO (FIAS). The president of FIAS was elected Spaniard Fernando Compte.

2022 - Unlike most international federations, FIAS has not banned Russian and Belarusians in response to the 2022 Russian invasion of Ukraine.

== Summary ==
1. 1973-1984: FILA
2. 1985-1990: FIAS
3. 1991-1993: FMS and FIAS
4. 1994-2005: FIAS EAST / FIAS WEST
5. 2006-NOW: FIAS (CURRENT SITUATION)

== Events ==
=== World Sambo Championships ===
The World Sambo Championships are the main championships in Sambo and Combat Sambo, organized by the Fédération Internationale de Sambo (FIAS).

Number	Year	Dates	Host	Champion	Events	Participating countries
1	1973	September 6–11	Tehran, Iran	Soviet Union	10	11
2	1974	July 26–28	Ulan Bator, Mongolia	Soviet Union	10	5
	1977	September – October	Canary Islands, Spain	cancelled by the Spanish authorities		
3	1979	December 11–14	Madrid, Spain	Soviet Union	10	11
4	1980	May 30–31	Madrid, Spain	Soviet Union	10	11
5	1981	February 28 – March 1	Madrid, Spain	Soviet Union	10	12
6	1982	July 3–4	Paris, France	Soviet Union	10	11
7	1983	September 30 – October 1	Kyiv, Soviet Union	Soviet Union	10	8
8	1984	June 14–15	Madrid, Spain	Soviet Union	10	10
9	1985	September 19–21	San Sebastián, Spain	Soviet Union	10	11
10	1986	November 21–24	Saint-Jean-de-Luz, France	Soviet Union	10	8
11	1987	November	Milan, Italy	Soviet Union	10	9
12	1988	December 1–5	Montreal, Canada	Soviet Union	10	11
13	1989	November 8–11	West Orange, United States	Soviet Union	10	9
14	1990	December 7–10	Moscow, Soviet Union	Soviet Union	10	18
15	1991	December 27	Montreal, Canada	Soviet Union	10	8
16	1992	November 6–10	Herne Bay, England	Russia	10	14
17	1993	November 9–15	Kstovo, Russia	Russia	10	28
18	1994	October 7–9	(Serbia and Montenegro) Novi Sad, Yugoslavia	Russia	10	20
19	1995	September 1–3	Sofia, Bulgaria	Russia	9	23
20	1996	November 1–3	Tokyo, Japan	Russia	18	23
21	1997	October 10–12	(Georgia (country)) Tbilisi, Georgia	(Georgia (country)) Georgia	18	20
22	1998	October 16–18	Kaliningrad, Russia	Russia	18	20
23	1999	November 12–14	Gijón, Spain	Russia	18	20
24	2000	November 25	Kyiv, Ukraine	Russia	18	21
25	2001	October 20–21	Krasnoyarsk, Russia	Russia	18	26
26	2002	November 26–29	Panama City, Panama	Russia	18	19
27	2003	October 18; November 6–10	Roquebrune-Cap-Martin, France (Combat Sambo); St. Petersburg, Russia	Russia	27	32
28	2004	June 16–21; September 25–26	Prague, Czech Republic (Combat Sambo); Chișinău, Moldova	Russia	27	23
29	2005	October 21–23; November 11–14	Prague, Czech Republic (Combat Sambo); Astana, Kazakhstan	Russia	27	27
30	2006	September 30 – October 2 November 3–5	Tashkent, Uzbekistan (Combat Sambo); Sofia, Bulgaria	Russia	27	33
31	2007	November 7–11	Prague, Czech Republic	Russia	27	43
32	2008	November 13–17	St. Petersburg, Russia	Russia	27	48
33	2009	November 5–9	Thessaloniki, Greece	Russia	27	46
34	2010	November 4–8	Tashkent, Uzbekistan	Russia	27	26
35	2011	November 10–14	Vilnius, Lithuania	Russia	27	65
36	2012	November 8–12	Minsk, Belarus	Russia	27	64
37	2013	November 7–11	St. Petersburg, Russia	Russia	27	70
38	2014	November 20–24	Narita, Japan	Russia	27	82
39	2015	November 12–16	Casablanca, Morocco	Russia	27	80
40	2016	November 10–14	Sofia, Bulgaria	Russia	27	77
41	2017	November 9–13	Sochi, Russia	Russia	27	90
42	2018	November 8–12	Bucharest, Romania	Russia	27	80
43	2019	November 7–11	Cheongju, South Korea	Russia	27	
44	2020	November 4–8	(Serbia) Novi Sad, Serbia	Russia	27	30
45	2021	November 12–14	(Uzbekistan) Tashkent, Uzbekistan		21	
46	2022	November 11–13	(Kyrgyzstan) Bishkek, Kyrgyzstan		21	

=== Asian Sambo Championships ===
Asian Sambo Championships is main Sambo and Combat Sambo championships in the Asia. Organized by Asian Sambo Federation (ASF). The First official Asian SAMBO Championship was held in October 1992 in Vladivostok city (Russia). Nineteen (19) Asian SAMBO Championships had been held in the period from 1992 up to 2011. Asian Championships among men and women, youth and juniors are being held annually. In 2005 combat SAMBO (among men) was included into the program of Asian Championships. In 2008 the ASF at the first time held Championships of West and South East Asia in Damascus in 19–20 June and Bangkok in 12–13 July respectively. Central Asian Sambo Championships.

- Seniors, Youth, Juniors. [M/F]
- Combat SAMBO for Senior [M]

Number	Year	Host city, Country	Events
10	2001		
11	2002		
12	2003		
13	2004		
14	2005		
15	2006		
16	2007		
17	2008		
18	2009		
19	2010		
20	2011	Tashkent, Uzbekistan	
21	2012	Tashkent, Uzbekistan	
22	2013	Seoul, South Korea	
23	2014	Tashkent, Uzbekistan	
24	2015	Atyrau, Kazakhstan	
25	2016	Ashgabat, Turkmenistan	67
25	2017	Tashkent, Uzbekistan	67

== Regional Championships ==
=== East Asian Sambo Championships ===
1. 2018 Chinese Taipei

=== Southeast Asian Sambo Championships ===
1. 2020 Indonesia

=== West Asian Sambo Championships ===
1. 2008 damascus Syria
2. 2009 damascus Syria

=== Central Asian Sambo Championships ===
1. 2017 Turkmenistan

== Cup ==
=== World Sambo Cup ===
FIAS World Cup (Sambo World Cup) and Supercup have been contested since 1969, initially held by FILA, and since 1985 by FIAS.

Sambo World Cup editions
Year	Dates	Location
1969		(Soviet Union) Riga
1970		(Soviet Union) Sochi
1975		(Soviet Union) Moscow
1976		(Japan) Tokyo
1977	9–12 June	(Spain) Oviedo
1980		(Spain) Madrid
1981	18–20 September	(Spain) Pontevedra
1982	11 June	(Spain) Bilbao
1983		(France) Lyon
1984	12–14 October	(Venezuela) Puerto la Cruz
1985	22 September	(Spain) San Sebastián
1986		(Japan) Tokyo
1987	4–5 April	(Morocco) Casablanca
1988	June	(Soviet Union) Moscow
1990		(Venezuela) Caracas
1992		Spain
1993		(Russia) Nizhny Novgorod
1994	May	(Russia) Kstovo
1999	28 November	(France) Nice
2000	27–29 November	(France) Nice
2001		(Russia) Moscow
2006	26 November	(France) Nice
2012		(Russia) Kazan

Sambo Supercup editions
Year	Dates	Location
1982		
2014		

== Zones ==
2022:

1. Asia - Tashkent, Uzbekistan - 32 Nation
2. Oceania - AUS - 1+2 Nation
3. Africa - Casablanca - 12+7 Nation
4. America - Cali, Colombia - 17+10 Nation
5. Europe - Russia, Moscow - 35+2 Nation

Total : 96 + 21 = 117 Nation

=== Asia ===
- Afghanistan KURASH, SAMBO & Belt Wrestling Federation
- Bahrain Sambo Federation
- Bangladesh SAMBO Association
- Chinese Taipei Sambo Association
- Sambo Federation of Hong Kong China
- SAMBO INDIA Association
- Indonesia SAMBO Federation
- Iraqi Jujitsu, Sambo and Kurash Federation
- Sambo Association of Islamic Republic of Iran
- Japan Sambo Federation
- Jordan Sambo Committee
- Kazakhstan Federation of Sport and Combat Sambo
- Sambo Federation of Kyrgyz Republic
- Lebanese SAMBO and Judo Federation
- Macau Sambo Association
- Malaysia Sambo Association
- Mongolian Sambo Federation
- Nepal Sambo Federation
- SAMBO Federation of Pakistan
- Palestinian Sambo & Kurash Committee
- Pilipinas Sambo Federation
- Korea Sambo Federation
- Saudi Sambo Committee
- Sambo division of Wrestling Federation of Singapore
- Sambo Federation Sri Lanka
- Syrian Arab Judo and Sambo Federation
- Sambo Federation of Republic of Tajikistan
- Sambo Association in Thailand
- Turkmenistan National Federation of Martial Arts
- Sambo Association of Uzbekistan
- Vietnam Sambo Association
- Yemen Sambo and Judo Federation

=== Oceania ===
Members

- Sambo Federation of Australia Limited

Candidates:

- New Zealand New Zealand Sambo Federation Inc.
- Tonga Tonga Sambo Association

=== Africa ===
Members

- National Algerian Sambo Committee
- Angola (Luanda) Sambo & Kurash Association
- Cameroonian Nanbudo Federation (National Sambo League)
- Ivorian SAMBO Federation
- Guinean Federation of Sambo and Associated Disciplines
- Mali SAMBO Federation
- Mauritius National Sambo Federation
- Royal Moroccan Federation of Sambo and Tai-Jitsu
- Niger Sambo Federation
- Senegalese Association of Sambo
- Seychelles Sambo Association
- Tunisian SAMBO Federation

Candidates

- Benin Beninese Sambo Federation
- Botswana Mixed Martial Arts Botswana
- Burundi Burundi Sambo Federation
- Central African Republic Central African Sambo Federation
- Egypt Egyptian Sambo Association
- Ghana Ghana Sambo Association
- Republic of the Congo Congolese Sambo Committee
- South Africa Sambo Federation of South Africa

=== America ===
Members

- Argentine Sambo Federation
- Brazilian Amateur Sambo Confederation
- United Canadian Sambo Federation
- Chilean National Sports Federation of Sambo and Martial Arts
- Colombian Sambo Federation
- Sambo and Associated Sports Federation of Costa Rica
- Amateur Federation of Sport and Combat Sambo of the Dominican Republic
- Salvadoran Association of Sambo and Related Disciplines
- National Sambo Association of Guatemala
- Sambo and Combat Sambo Association of Mexico
- Nicaraguan Sambo Federation
- Panama Sambo Association
- Peruvian Amateur Sambo Federation
- Trinidad and Tobago Sambo and Combat Sambo Federation
- Uruguayan Sambo and Combat Sambo Association
- USA Sambo Inc.
- Venezuelan Sambo Federation

Candidates

- Antigua and Barbuda Antigua and Barbuda Sambo Association
- Barbados Barbados Sambo Federation
- Cuba Cuban Sambo and Allied Disciplines Association
- Ecuador Sambo Clubs Association of Ecuador
- Guyana Guyana Sambo and Combat Sambo Federation
- Haiti Haitian Sambo Federation
- Honduras Honduran Sambo Association
- Jamaica Jamaica Sambo and Combat Sambo Federation
- Paraguay Paraguayan Sambo Federation
- Saint Lucia Sambo and Combat Sambo Federation of Saint Lucia

=== Europe ===
Members

- Sambo Federation of Armenia
- Azerbaijan Federation of Sambo
- Public Organization "Belarusian Sambo Federation"
- Belgian Sambo Federation
- Bulgarian Sambo Federation
- Croatian Sambo Federation
- Cyprus Sambo Federation
- Czech Sambo Union
- Estonian Sambo Association
- Finnish Sambo Federation
- French Sambo Committee
- Georgian National Federation of Sambo
- German Sambo Federation
- British Sombo Federation
- Hellenic Federation Sambo, Kurash, Chidaoba
- Hungarian Sambo Federation
- Sambo Ireland
- Sambo Federation of Israel
- Italian Federation of Kickboxing, Muay Thai, Shootboxing, Savate, Sambo (F.I.KBMS)
- Latvian Sambo Federation
- Lithuanian Sambo Federation
- Montenegro Sambo Federation
- Dutch Sambo Federation
- Polish Sambo Association
- Sambo Federation of Moldova
- Sambo Federation of North Macedonia
- Romanian Sambo Federation
- All-Russian Sambo Federation
- Sambo Federation of Serbia
- Sambo Federation Slovak Republic
- Slovenian Sambo Federation
- Spanish Federation of Olympic Wrestling and Associated Disciplines
- Swiss Federation of Sambo and Associated Disciplines
- Sambo Clubs Federation of Turkey
- National Ukrainian Sambo Federation

Candidates

- Bosnia and Herzegovina
- Malta

== Members ==
The following are members of the Fédération Internationale de Sambo (2014-2016).

Africa - Confederation Africaine de Sambo Amateur

- Algeria
- Cameroon
- Mauritius
- Morocco
- Niger
- Senegal
- Sierra Leone
- Tunisia

Candidate members

- Madagascar
- South Africa
- Seychelles

The Americas - Pan-American Amateur Sambo Federation

- Canada
- Colombia
- Mexico
- Panama
- United States
- Venezuela

Candidate members

- Aruba
- Bolivia
- Brazil
- Puerto Rico

Asia - Asian Sambo Federation

- Afghanistan
- India
- Indonesia
- Iran
- Iraq
- Japan
- Jordan
- Kazakhstan
- Korea
- Kyrgyzstan
- Lebanon
- Malaysia
- Mongolia
- Nepal
- Pakistan
- Palestine
- Philippines
- Singapore
- Syria
- Chinese Taipei
- Tajikistan
- Thailand
- Turkmenistan
- Uzbekistan
- Yemen

Oceania - Australia/Oceania Sambo Federation

- Australia
- New Zealand

Europe - European Sambo Federation

- Armenia
- Austria
- Azerbaijan
- Belarus
- Belgium
- Bulgaria
- Croatia
- Cyprus
- Czech Republic
- Estonia
- Finland
- France
- Georgia
- Germany
- Great Britain
- Greece
- Ireland
- Israel
- Italy
- Latvia
- Lithuania
- Moldova
- Montenegro
- Netherlands
- Poland
- Portugal
- Romania
- Russia
- Serbia
- Slovakia
- Slovenia
- Spain
- Switzerland
- Ukraine

Candidate members

- Bosnia and Herzegovina
- Malta

== Presidents ==
List of FIAS Presidents

- (Spain) Fernando Compte (1992-1997)
- (Japan) Tomoyuki Horimai (1997-2005)
- (Russia) Mikhail Tikhomirov (2005)
- (Russia) Vladimir Putin (2005-2009)
- (United States) David Rudman (2009-2013)
- (Russia) Vasily Shestakov (2013-)

== Events ==
- Sambo at the 2013 Summer Universiade
- Sambo at the 2013 World Combat Games
- European Sambo Championships
- World Sambo Championships
