= Mariya Oryashkova =

Bulgarian sambo practitioner and freestyle wrestler (born 1988)

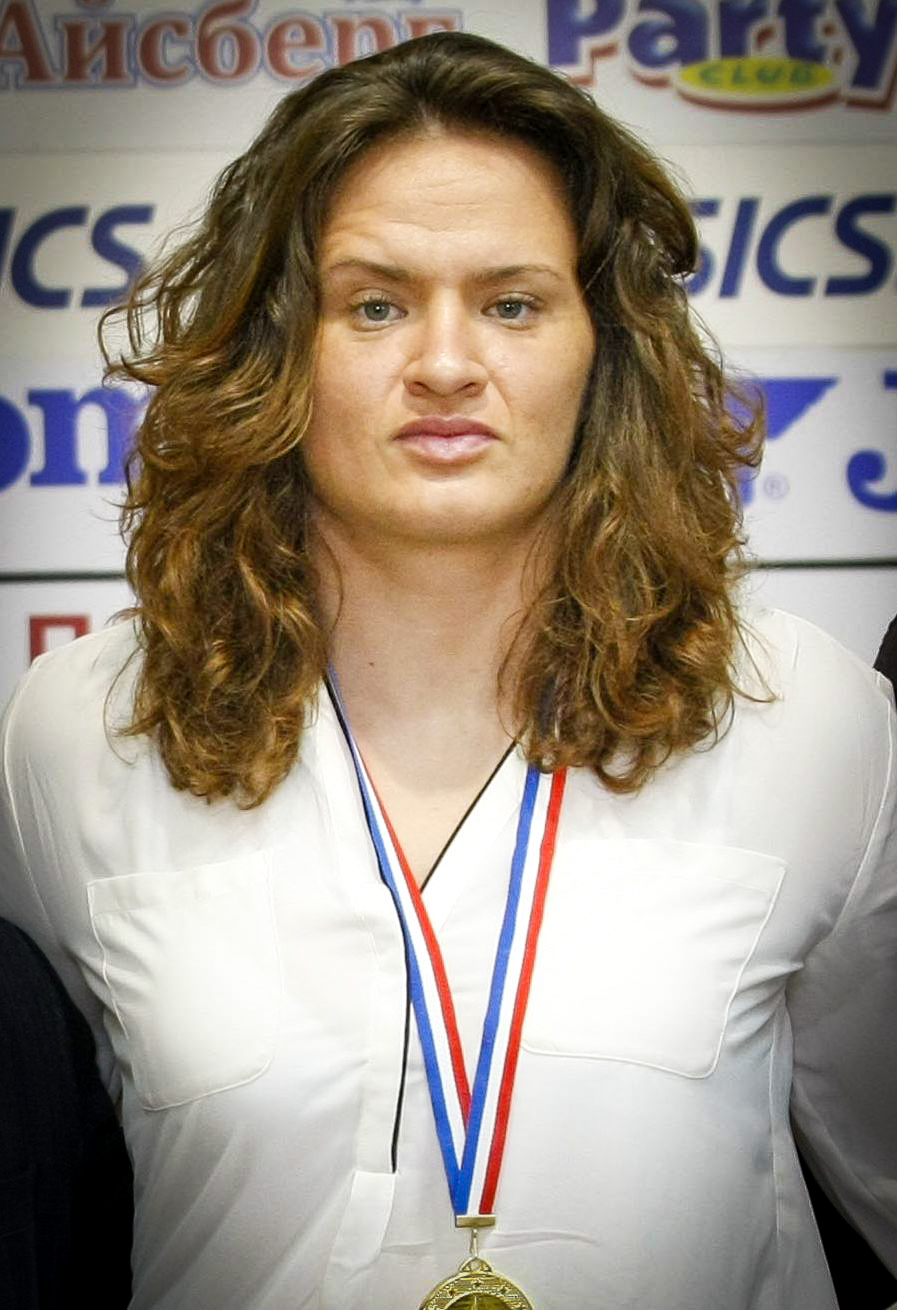

Personal information
- Born: 12 January 1988 (age 38) Pirdop, Bulgaria

Sport
- Sport: Sambo, judo, sumo, freestyle wrestling
Medal record
Representing Bulgaria
Women's sambo
World Championships
Gold medal – first place	2006 Tashkent	80 kg
Gold medal – first place	2008 Saint Petersburg	80 kg
Gold medal – first place	2009 Thessaloniki	80 kg
Gold medal – first place	2016 Sofia	80 kg
Gold medal – first place	2019 Seoul	80 kg
Gold medal – first place	2020 Novi Sad	80 kg
Silver medal – second place	2007 Prague	80 kg
Silver medal – second place	2013 Saint Petersburg	80 kg
Silver medal – second place	2014 Narita	80 kg
Silver medal – second place	2015 Casablanca	80 kg
Silver medal – second place	2018 Bucharest	80 kg
Bronze medal – third place	2010 Tashkent	80 kg
Bronze medal – third place	2011 Vilnius	80 kg
Bronze medal – third place	2017 Sochi	80 kg
Bronze medal – third place	2021 Tashkent	80 kg
European Games
Gold medal – first place	2019 Minsk	80 kg
European Championships
Gold medal – first place	2006 Belgrade	80 kg
Gold medal – first place	2007 Pravets	80 kg
Gold medal – first place	2008 Tbilisi	80 kg
Gold medal – first place	2009 Milan	80 kg
Gold medal – first place	2010 Minsk	80 kg
Gold medal – first place	2011 Sofia	80 kg
Gold medal – first place	2012 Moscow	80 kg
Gold medal – first place	2015 Zagreb	80 kg
Gold medal – first place	2017 Minsk	80 kg
Gold medal – first place	2018 Athens	80 kg
Gold medal – first place	2021 Limassol	80 kg
Silver medal – second place	2014 Bucharest	80 kg
Women's beach sambo
World Championships
Gold medal – first place	2021 Larnaca	+72 kg

Mariya Gerginova Oryashkova (Bulgarian: Мария Гергинова Оряшкова; born 12 January 1988) is a Bulgarian sambist, judoka, sumo wrestler and freestyle wrestler.

She competed in the 80 kg category and is the 2019 European Games champion, a record eleven-time European and six-time world champion in the sport of sambo. She is also a 15-time Bulgarian champion in various age groups in judo.

== Biography ==
Oryashkova was born in the town of Pirdop. When she was 10 years old, she and her mother moved to the village of Bata, after her parents separated. Her early years were spent in Panagyurishte, where her sports career began, thanks world sambo champion Ivan Netov discovering her. He has been her coach for years, with him she achieved many of her prestigious results.

In 2015, Oryashkova underwent successful surgery for torn knee ligaments.

In 2022, Oryashkova acquired a scientific degree "Doctor" in direction 7.6 - Sport in the scientific specialty "Theory and Methodology of Sports Science" at the National Sports Academy "Vasil Levski".

In 2023, Oryashkova participated in season 5 of "Igri na volyata", a Nova reality competition series based on the Colombian series Desafío, where she finished in 10th place.

On 22 August 2025, Oryashkova announced the birth of her first child.

== Sambo career ==
In 2019, Oryashkova entered the history of the European Games as the only athlete participating in two sports – wrestling and sambo. In 2019 and 2020, she won the "Golden Belt" respectively in the "Bright Victory" and "Best Athlete - Women" categories of the Bulgarian Sambo Federation at the III and IV Annual "Golden Belt" Awards, established by the National Association of Combat Sports in Bulgaria. In 2020, she was No. 4 in the Bulgarian Sportsperson of the Year ranking. She was also awarded as "Sportsperson of the Year" of Panagyurishte Municipality.

In 2021, at the European Sambo Championships, Oryashkova won her eleventh and final European title. Later that year, she won the gold medal at the Beach Sambo World Championships and bronze medal at the World Championships. Oryashkova was elected as a member of the executive committee of the International Sambo Federation with the most votes at a congress of the International Headquarters held in Tashkent in 2021. The same year she received an award from the municipality of Panagyurishte for outstanding contribution to the promotion of sports.

In 2023, Oryashkova announced her retirement from professional sports during the recording of "Igri na volyata".
