= Baasankhüügiin Damlanpürev =

Mongolian martial artist born 1984

Personal information
- Nationality: Mongolia
- Born: 1984 (age 41–42) Mongolia
- Weight: 62 kg (137 lb)

Sport
- Sport: Sambo
- Event: 62 kg
Medal record
Men's сombat sambo
Representing Mongolia
World Championships
Gold medal – first place	2008 Saint Petersburg	62 kg
Gold medal – first place	2007 Prague	62 kg

Baasankhüügiin Damlanpürev (Mongolian: Баасанхүүгийн Дамланпүрэв; born 1984) is a Mongolian martial artist. Damlanpürev held a winner title for the 62 kg class at the World Combat Sambo Championships in 2007, 2008.

Damlanpürev started practicing the sambo wrestling and Olympic judo in 1998 while living in Övörkhangai Province. He studied at the Avarga University. In 2005, he became interested in the combat sambo and began to practice it. That same year, he took part in the first national combat sambo championship. In 2007 and 2008 he won the World Combat Sambo Championships. He was aiming to be part of the Mongolian Olympic judo team and even won the national judo championship in 2008. Аlso since 2008 Damlanpürev has competed in MMA. When he was the active wrestler, he trained at the "Khüсh" Club. In 2021, Damlanpürev started his own MMA gym, naming it Mazaalai Fighting Center, after the Mongolian Gobi bear, known as Mazaalai.
