= Svetlana Galante =

Russian judoka and sambo practitioner

Svetlana Alekseevna Galante
Personal information
- Native name: Светлана Алексеевна Галянт
- Full name: Svetlana Alekseevna Galante
- Nationality: Russian
- Born: 23 May 1973 (age 53) Chișinău, Moldavian SSR
- Education: Far Eastern State Academy of Physical Culture and Sports

Sport
- Sport: Sambo, Judo
Medal record
Representing Russia
Women's Sambo
World Championships
| Gold medal – first place | 2012 Minsk | 72 kg |
| Gold medal – first place | 2011 Vilnius | 72 kg |
| Gold medal – first place | 2010 Tashkent | 72 kg |
| Bronze medal – third place | 2009 Thessaloniki | 72 kg |
| Gold medal – first place | 2008 St. Petersburg | 72 kg |
| Gold medal – first place | 2006 Sofia | 72 kg |
| Gold medal – first place | 2000 Kyiv | 72 kg |
Women's judo
World Military Championships
| Silver medal – second place | 2002 Beijing | 70 kg |
| Silver medal – second place | 1998 St. Petersburg | 70 kg |
Military World Games
| Bronze medal – third place | 1999 Zagreb | 70 kg |
European Junior Judo Championships
| Bronze medal – third place | 1991 Pieksämäki | 72 kg |

Svetlana Alekseevna Galante (born 23 May 1973) is a Russian judoka and a sambo practitioner. She is considered to be one of the greatest practitioners of Sambo and is a member of the FIAS Hall of fame.

== Biography ==
Galante was born in 1973 in Chișinău, Moldavian SSR. In 1985, she moved to Kamchatka Oblast in the Russian SFSR. She graduated from the Far Eastern State Academy of Physical Culture in Russia.

== Sports career ==
Galante compared in both Judo and Sambo. She started in Judo where she won a Bronze medal at the 1991 European Junior Judo Championships.

Galante competed in the women's half-heavyweight event in Judo at the 1996 Summer Olympics. She lost in the round of 16 to Ulla Werbrouck, the eventual Gold Medal winner. In the Repechage, she defeated Cristina Curto in the quarterfinals before losing to Ylenia Scapin in the semifinals. Her final position was ranked 7th.

Later on she earned two Silver Medals in Judo at the World Military Championships and one Bronze Medal at the Military World Games.

Galante then competed in Sambo where she achieved greater success. From 2000 to 2012, she was multiple time winner at the World Sambo Championships.

In 2014, Galante announced her retirement from professional sports.

== Political career ==
Galante is currently a Deputy in the Legislative Assembly of Kamchatka Krai.
