= 2009 World Sambo Championships =

Sambo competitions

- Location: Thessaloniki, Greece
- Dates: 5–9 November

The 2009 World Sambo Championships was held in Thessaloniki, Greece between the 5th and 9 November 2009. This tournament included competition in both sport Sambo, and Combat Sambo.

== Categories ==
- Combat Sambo: 52 kg, 57 kg, 62 kg, 68 kg, 74 kg, 82 kg, 90 kg, 100 kg, +100 kg
- Men's Sambo: 52 kg, 57 kg, 62 kg, 68 kg, 74 kg, 82 kg, 90 kg, 100 kg, +100 kg
- Women's Sambo: 48 kg, 52 kg, 56 kg, 60 kg, 64 kg, 68 kg, 72 kg, 80 kg, +80 kg

== Medal overview ==
=== Combat Sambo Events ===
Event	Gold	Silver	Bronze
Half-flyweight (52 kg)	Eradzh Rakhimov (TJK)	Alexander Nesterov (RUS)	Sergii Chornyi (UKR)
Half-flyweight (52 kg)	Eradzh Rakhimov (TJK)	Alexander Nesterov (RUS)	Illiazbek Karabaev (KGZ)
Flyweight (57 kg)	Marko Kosev (BUL)	Sergei Glushenko (UKR)	Kadir Sultanov (UZB)
Flyweight (57 kg)	Marko Kosev (BUL)	Sergei Glushenko (UKR)	Bekdiyar Tuleuov (KAZ)
Half-lightweight (62 kg)	Mikhail Pankov (RUS)	Artemij Sitenkov (LTU)	Ilkhom Satvaldiev (UZB)
Half-lightweight (62 kg)	Mikhail Pankov (RUS)	Artemij Sitenkov (LTU)	Kayrat Zhalgasbaev (KAZ)
Lightweight (68 kg)	Sergej Grecicho (LTU)	Vachik Vardanyan (ARM)	Nurbek Samidinov (KAZ)
Lightweight (68 kg)	Sergej Grecicho (LTU)	Vachik Vardanyan (ARM)	Aybek Dash-Shivi (RUS)
Welterweight (74 kg)	Vener Galiev (RUS)	Alexander Fedorov (EST)	Tamerlane Ikhsangliyev (KAZ)
Welterweight (74 kg)	Vener Galiev (RUS)	Alexander Fedorov (EST)	Viktor Tomashevic (LTU)
Half-middleweight (82 kg)	Rumen Dimitrov (BUL)	Aleksey Gagarin (RUS)	Zhanybek Amatov (KGZ)
Half-middleweight (82 kg)	Rumen Dimitrov (BUL)	Aleksey Gagarin (RUS)	Cedric Certenzis (FRA)
Middleweight (90 kg)	Vyacheslav Vasilevsky (RUS)	Boris Velichkov (BUL)	Eldor Gujamov (UZB)
Middleweight (90 kg)	Vyacheslav Vasilevsky (RUS)	Boris Velichkov (BUL)	Georgy Yemelanov (KAZ)
Half-heavyweight (100 kg)	Sergei Khramov (RUS)	Bobi Brankov (BUL)	Sebastian Lebebe (FRA)
Half-heavyweight (100 kg)	Sergei Khramov (RUS)	Bobi Brankov (BUL)	Marian Iordan (ROU)
Heavyweight (+100 kg)	Aleksey Knyazev (RUS)	Zamirbek Serga Baen (KGZ)	Jure Vušnik (SLO)
Heavyweight (+100 kg)	Aleksey Knyazev (RUS)	Zamirbek Serga Baen (KGZ)	Tadas Rimkevicius (LTU)

=== Women's events ===
Event	Gold	Silver	Bronze
Extra-lightweight (48 kg)	Polina Rubel (RUS)	Tatiana Trivich (SRB)	Tatyana Moskvina (BLR)
Extra-lightweight (48 kg)	Polina Rubel (RUS)	Tatiana Trivich (SRB)	Gabriela Kirilova (BUL)
Half-lightweight (52 kg)	Diana Alieva (RUS)	Olga Lazoriv (UKR)	Gergana Vatsova (BUL)
Half-lightweight (52 kg)	Diana Alieva (RUS)	Olga Lazoriv (UKR)	Disna Lunar (VEN)
Lightweight (56 kg)	Diyana Morich (SRB)	Ugiljon Ruzmetova (UKR)	Tatiana Zenchenko (RUS)
Lightweight (56 kg)	Diyana Morich (SRB)	Ugiljon Ruzmetova (UKR)	Elitsa Razheva (BUL)
Welterweight (60 kg)	Katsiaryna Prakapenka (BLR)	Yana Kostenko (RUS)	Ivelina Ilieva (BUL)
Welterweight (60 kg)	Katsiaryna Prakapenka (BLR)	Yana Kostenko (RUS)	Anna Repida (MDA)
Half-middleweight (64 kg)	Anastasia Lieshkova (BLR)	Ekaterina Goldberg (RUS)	Valentina Karaush (MDA)
Half-middleweight (64 kg)	Anastasia Lieshkova (BLR)	Ekaterina Goldberg (RUS)	Adriana Cherar (ROU)
Middleweight (68 kg)	Olga Usoltseva (RUS)	Kalzhan Tayzhanova (KAZ)	Snezhana Delibashich (SRB)
Middleweight (68 kg)	Olga Usoltseva (RUS)	Kalzhan Tayzhanova (KAZ)	Mariyanna Davydova (MDA)
Super-middleweight (72 kg)	Katsiaryna Radzevich (BLR)	Tetiana Savenko (UKR)	Aliya Dzhilkybaeva (KAZ)
Super-middleweight (72 kg)	Katsiaryna Radzevich (BLR)	Tetiana Savenko (UKR)	Svetlana Galante (RUS)
Half-heavyweight (80 kg)	Mariya Oryashkova (BUL)	Anna Subbotina (RUS)	Vanya Mandich (SRB)
Half-heavyweight (80 kg)	Mariya Oryashkova (BUL)	Anna Subbotina (RUS)	Anastasia Matrosova (UKR)
Heavyweight (+80 kg)	Irina Rodina (RUS)	Yuliya Barysik (BLR)	Angelika Sopp (EST)
Heavyweight (+80 kg)	Irina Rodina (RUS)	Yuliya Barysik (BLR)	Olga Davydko (UKR)

=== Men's Sambo Events ===
Event	Gold	Silver	Bronze
Half-flyweight (52 kg)	Erbolat Baibatirov (KAZ)	Denis Cherentsov (RUS)	Ushangi Kuzanashvili (GEO)
Half-flyweight (52 kg)	Erbolat Baibatirov (KAZ)	Denis Cherentsov (RUS)	Savkat Juraev (UZB)
Flyweight (57 kg)	Dauren Zhaynakov (KAZ)	Islam Kasimov (AZE)	Ravshan Turakulov (UZB)
Flyweight (57 kg)	Dauren Zhaynakov (KAZ)	Islam Kasimov (AZE)	Anton Mashkovich (BLR)
Half-lightweight (62 kg)	Aleksander Pankov (RUS)	Boris Borisov (BUL)	Ihar Siladoi (BLR)
Half-lightweight (62 kg)	Aleksander Pankov (RUS)	Boris Borisov (BUL)	Azamat Mykanov (KAZ)
Lightweight (68 kg)	Tsagaanbaatar Khashbaatar (MNG)	Arman Sanserbin (KAZ)	Kim Kwangsub (KOR)
Lightweight (68 kg)	Tsagaanbaatar Khashbaatar (MNG)	Arman Sanserbin (KAZ)	Stefan Shopov (BUL)
Low-middleweight (74 kg)	Denis Mukhin (RUS)	Viktor Savinov (UKR)	Asylbek Alykey (KAZ)
Low-middleweight (74 kg)	Denis Mukhin (RUS)	Viktor Savinov (UKR)	Ashot Danielyan (ARM)
Half-middleweight (82 kg)	Aleksey Kharitonov (RUS)	Niko Kutsiya (GEO)	Magomed Abdulganilov (BLR)
Half-middleweight (82 kg)	Aleksey Kharitonov (RUS)	Niko Kutsiya (GEO)	Sergei Balaban (UKR)
Middleweight (90 kg)	Alsim Chernoskulov (RUS)	Mindia Bodaveli (GEO)	Ivan Vasylchuk (UKR)
Middleweight (90 kg)	Alsim Chernoskulov (RUS)	Mindia Bodaveli (GEO)	Andrei Kazusionak (BLR)
Half-heavyweight (100 kg)	Evgeniy Isaev (RUS)	Nabimukhamad Khorkashev (TJK)	Yauhen Siomachkin (BLR)
Half-heavyweight (100 kg)	Evgeniy Isaev (RUS)	Nabimukhamad Khorkashev (TJK)	Mirian Pavliashvili (GEO)
Heavyweight (+100 kg)	Vitaly Minakov (RUS)	Yury Rybak (BLR)	Ivan Iliev (BUL)
Heavyweight (+100 kg)	Vitaly Minakov (RUS)	Yury Rybak (BLR)	Juan Castro (VEN)

=== Medal table ===
Rank	Nation	Gold	Silver	Bronze	Total
1	Russia	15	6	3	24
2	Bulgaria	3	3	5	11
3	Belarus	3	2	6	11
4	Kazakhstan	2	2	6	10
5	Lithuania	1	1	2	4
5	Serbia	1	1	2	4
7	Tajikistan	1	1	0	2
8	Mongolia	1	0	0	1
9	Ukraine	0	5	5	10
10	Georgia	0	2	2	4
11	Kyrgyzstan	0	1	2	3
12	Armenia	0	1	1	2
12	Estonia	0	1	1	2
14	Azerbaijan	0	1	0	1
15	Uzbekistan	0	0	5	5
16	Moldova	0	0	3	3
17	France	0	0	2	2
17	Romania	0	0	2	2
17	Venezuela	0	0	2	2
20	Slovenia	0	0	1	1
20	South Korea	0	0	1	1
22	Algeria	0	0	0	0
22	Austria	0	0	0	0
22	Belgium	0	0	0	0
22	Cameroon	0	0	0	0
22	Canada	0	0	0	0
22	Colombia	0	0	0	0
22	Cyprus	0	0	0	0
22	Czech Republic	0	0	0	0
22	Ecuador	0	0	0	0
22	Finland	0	0	0	0
22	Great Britain	0	0	0	0
22	India	0	0	0	0
22	Indonesia	0	0	0	0
22	Ireland	0	0	0	0
22	Israel	0	0	0	0
22	Italy	0	0	0	0
22	Japan	0	0	0	0
22	Jordan	0	0	0	0
22	Lebanon	0	0	0	0
22	Malaysia	0	0	0	0
22	Mauritius	0	0	0	0
22	Morocco	0	0	0	0
22	Nepal	0	0	0	0
22	New Zealand	0	0	0	0
22	Pakistan	0	0	0	0
22	Panama	0	0	0	0
22	Peru	0	0	0	0
22	Poland	0	0	0	0
22	Slovakia	0	0	0	0
22	Spain	0	0	0	0
22	Syria	0	0	0	0
22	Thailand	0	0	0	0
22	Tunisia	0	0	0	0
22	Turkey	0	0	0	0
22	United States	0	0	0	0
22	Yemen	0	0	0	0
Totals (57 entries)		27	27	51	105
