= 2010 World Sambo Championships =

Sambo competitions

- Location: Tashkent, Uzbekistan
- Dates: 4–8 November

The 2010 World Sambo Championships was held in Tashkent, Uzbekistan between 4 and 8 November 2010. This tournament included competition in both sport Sambo, and Combat Sambo.

== Categories ==
- Combat Sambo: 52 kg, 57 kg, 62 kg, 68 kg, 74 kg, 82 kg, 90 kg, 100 kg, +100 kg
- Men's Sambo: 52 kg, 57 kg, 62 kg, 68 kg, 74 kg, 82 kg, 90 kg, 100 kg, +100 kg
- Women's Sambo: 48 kg, 52 kg, 56 kg, 60 kg, 64 kg, 68 kg, 72 kg, 80 kg, +80 kg

== Medal overview ==
=== Combat Sambo Events ===
Event	Gold	Silver	Bronze
Half-flyweight (52 kg)	Sattor Ergashev (UZB)	Alexander Nesterov (RUS)	Sergii Chornyi (UKR)
Half-flyweight (52 kg)	Sattor Ergashev (UZB)	Alexander Nesterov (RUS)	Almaz Suleymenov (KAZ)
Flyweight (57 kg)	Marko Kosev (BUL)	Ali Bagautinov (RUS)	Andreas Bernard (GER)
Flyweight (57 kg)	Marko Kosev (BUL)	Ali Bagautinov (RUS)	Alexey Murashkin (KAZ)
Half-lightweight (62 kg)	Rasul Mirzaev (RUS)	Baasankhun Damlanpurev (MNG)	Ilkhom Satvaldiev (UZB)
Half-lightweight (62 kg)	Rasul Mirzaev (RUS)	Baasankhun Damlanpurev (MNG)	Fransino Tirta (IDN)
Lightweight (68 kg)	Vachik Vardanyan (ARM)	Sergej Grecicho (LTU)	Alisher Turaev (UZB)
Lightweight (68 kg)	Vachik Vardanyan (ARM)	Sergej Grecicho (LTU)	Ruslan Gasankhanov (RUS)
Welterweight (74 kg)	Bair Omoktuev (RUS)	Viktor Tomashevic (LTU)	Furkat Ruziev (UZB)
Welterweight (74 kg)	Bair Omoktuev (RUS)	Viktor Tomashevic (LTU)	Rumen Dimitrov (BUL)
Half-middleweight (82 kg)	Murad Kerimov (RUS)	Rosen Dimitrov (BUL)	Fariddun Ustopirov (TJK)
Half-middleweight (82 kg)	Murad Kerimov (RUS)	Rosen Dimitrov (BUL)	Sarldor Shovrikov (UZB)
Middleweight (90 kg)	Vyacheslav Vasilevsky (RUS)	Eldor Gujamov (UZB)	Bakhtiyar Abbasov (AZE)
Middleweight (90 kg)	Vyacheslav Vasilevsky (RUS)	Eldor Gujamov (UZB)	Umed Khasanbekov (TJK)
Half-heavyweight (100 kg)	Islam Abasov (RUS)	Zarif Rasulov (UZB)	Igor Zadernovskiy (UKR)
Half-heavyweight (100 kg)	Islam Abasov (RUS)	Zarif Rasulov (UZB)	Shakhmaral Jetpissov (KAZ)
Heavyweight (+100 kg)	Kirill Sidelnikov (RUS)	Stanoy Tabakov (BUL)	Vladimir Beheza (UKR)
Heavyweight (+100 kg)	Kirill Sidelnikov (RUS)	Stanoy Tabakov (BUL)	Oleg Glukhov (KAZ)

=== Women's events ===
Event	Gold	Silver	Bronze
Extra-lightweight (48 kg)	Munkhbatyn Urantsetseg (MGL)	Tatyana Moskvina (BLR)	Mariya Molchanova (RUS)
Extra-lightweight (48 kg)	Munkhbatyn Urantsetseg (MGL)	Tatyana Moskvina (BLR)	Gabriela Kirilova (BUL)
Half-lightweight (52 kg)	Baatarsaikhany Solongo (MGL)	Susanna Mirzoyan (RUS)	Gergana Vatsova (BUL)
Half-lightweight (52 kg)	Baatarsaikhany Solongo (MGL)	Susanna Mirzoyan (RUS)	Lenariya Mingazova (KAZ)
Lightweight (56 kg)	Kalina Stefanova (BUL)	Anara Estebesova (KGZ)	Ugiljon Ruzmetova (UKR)
Lightweight (56 kg)	Kalina Stefanova (BUL)	Anara Estebesova (KGZ)	Tatiana Zenchenko (RUS)
Welterweight (60 kg)	Ivelina Ilieva (BUL)	Olena Sayko (UKR)	Yana Kostenko (RUS)
Welterweight (60 kg)	Ivelina Ilieva (BUL)	Olena Sayko (UKR)	Katsiaryna Prakapenka (BLR)
Half-middleweight (64 kg)	Irina Gromova (RUS)	Vanya Ivanova (BUL)	Anastasia Lieshkova (BLR)
Half-middleweight (64 kg)	Irina Gromova (RUS)	Vanya Ivanova (BUL)	Almira Issatayeva (KAZ)
Middleweight (68 kg)	Olga Usoltseva (RUS)	Mariyanna Davydova (MDA)	Gulasal Khaydarova (UZB)
Middleweight (68 kg)	Olga Usoltseva (RUS)	Mariyanna Davydova (MDA)	Mariya Semenyuk (UKR)
Super-middleweight (72 kg)	Svetlana Galyant (RUS)	Aliya Dzhilkybaeva (KAZ)	Sohiba Eshtemirova (UZB)
Super-middleweight (72 kg)	Svetlana Galyant (RUS)	Aliya Dzhilkybaeva (KAZ)	Katsiaryna Radzevich (BLR)
Half-heavyweight (80 kg)	Natalia Kasantseva (RUS)	Battulgyn Munkhtuyaa (MGL)	Mariya Oryashkova (BUL)
Half-heavyweight (80 kg)	Natalia Kasantseva (RUS)	Battulgyn Munkhtuyaa (MGL)	Tetiana Savenko (UKR)
Heavyweight (+80 kg)	Irina Rodina (RUS)	Iryna Iadkouskaya (BLR)	Anar Sitimova (KAZ)
Heavyweight (+80 kg)	Irina Rodina (RUS)	Iryna Iadkouskaya (BLR)	Obida Alladusova (UZB)

=== Men's Sambo Events ===
Event	Gold	Silver	Bronze
Half-flyweight (52 kg)	Elchin Mailov (AZE)	Shavkat Juraev (UZB)	Andrei Kurlypa (BLR)
Half-flyweight (52 kg)	Elchin Mailov (AZE)	Shavkat Juraev (UZB)	Akmaliddin Karimov (TJK)
Flyweight (57 kg)	Erbolat Baybatyrov (KAZ)	Islam Kasimov (AZE)	Chinbat Otgon (MNG)
Flyweight (57 kg)	Erbolat Baybatyrov (KAZ)	Islam Kasimov (AZE)	Sergey Yalushev (RUS)
Half-lightweight (62 kg)	Azamat Mykanov (KAZ)	Boris Borisov (BUL)	Elnur Ahmadov (AZE)
Half-lightweight (62 kg)	Azamat Mykanov (KAZ)	Boris Borisov (BUL)	Nurlan Eraliev (KGZ)
Lightweight (68 kg)	Dmitry Bazylev (BLR)	Levan Nakhurishvili (GEO)	Arsen Khatip (KAZ)
Lightweight (68 kg)	Dmitry Bazylev (BLR)	Levan Nakhurishvili (GEO)	Nikita Kletskov (RUS)
Low-middleweight (74 kg)	Ashot Danielyan (ARM)	Aleksey Ramanchyk (BLR)	Dmitriy Lebedev (RUS)
Low-middleweight (74 kg)	Ashot Danielyan (ARM)	Aleksey Ramanchyk (BLR)	Shuhrat Boboev (UZB)
Half-middleweight (82 kg)	Rais Rakhmatullin (RUS)	Levan Tsiklauri (GEO)	Elmeddin Ahmadov (AZE)
Half-middleweight (82 kg)	Rais Rakhmatullin (RUS)	Levan Tsiklauri (GEO)	Sayat Shamsyev (KAZ)
Middleweight (90 kg)	Andrei Kazusionak (BLR)	Mindia Bodaveli (GEO)	Eduard Kurginyan (RUS)
Middleweight (90 kg)	Andrei Kazusionak (BLR)	Mindia Bodaveli (GEO)	Mindiaa Bodaveli (GEO)
Half-heavyweight (100 kg)	Artem Osipenko (RUS)	Nabimukhamad Khorkashev (TJK)	Yauhen Siomachkin (BLR)
Half-heavyweight (100 kg)	Artem Osipenko (RUS)	Nabimukhamad Khorkashev (TJK)	Olim Khudaykulov (UZB)
Heavyweight (+100 kg)	Vitaly Minakov (RUS)	Ivan Iliev (BUL)	Azamat Turdanov (UZB)
Heavyweight (+100 kg)	Vitaly Minakov (RUS)	Ivan Iliev (BUL)	Alexander Davitashvili (GEO)
