= Alsim Chernoskulov =

Russian sambist (born 1983)

Personal information
- Nationality: Russian
- Born: 11 May 1983 (age 43) Kipel', Yurgamyshsky District, Kurgan Oblast, RSFSR, Soviet Union
- Weight: –100

Sport
- Sport: Sambo; Judo
- Club: UMMC
- Coached by: L. S. Chernoskulov; V. G. Stennikov; A. N. Melnikov
Medal record
Men's sambo
Representing Russia
World Championships
Gold medal – first place	2009 Thessaloniki	–90 kg
Gold medal – first place	2012 Minsk	–100 kg
Gold medal – first place	2014 Narita	–90 kg
Gold medal – first place	2015 Casablanca	–90 kg
Gold medal – first place	2017 Sochi	–100 kg
Gold medal – first place	2018 Bucharest	–100 kg
Silver medal – second place	2006 Sofia	–90 kg
Silver medal – second place	2007 Prague	–90 kg
Silver medal – second place	2011 Vilnius	–90 kg
European Championships
Gold medal – first place	2008 Tbilisi	–90 kg
Gold medal – first place	2010 Minsk	–90 kg
European Games
Gold medal – first place	2015 Baku	–90 kg
Bronze medal – third place	2019 Baku	–100 kg

Alsim Leonidovich Chernoskulov (Russian: Альсим Леонидович Черноскулов; born 11 May 1983) is a Russian sambist and judoka. He is a sixfold World Champion in sambo. He is also a ninefold Russian National Champion.

Alsim's father Leonid enjoyed Vasily Zhukovsky's ballade "Alina and Alsim" and so named his daughter and son after the personages.

He was awarded the Medal of the Order "For Merit to the Fatherland", II grade, on 2 July 2015.
