= 2021 World Sambo Championships =

Sambo competition

- Location: Tashkent, Uzbekistan
- Dates: 12–14 November 2021

The 2021 World Sambo Championships is an edition of the World Sambo Championships, organised by the International Sambo Federation. It was held in Tashkent, Uzbekistan from 12 to 14 November 2021.

== Medal summary ==
=== Men's events ===
Event	Gold	Silver	Bronze
−58 kg	Akmaliddin Karimov (TJK)	Sayan Khertek (RUS)	Vakhtangi Chidrashvili (GEO)
−58 kg	Akmaliddin Karimov (TJK)	Sayan Khertek (RUS)	Bolatbek Raiymkulov (KAZ)
−64 kg	Rakhat Zhananiyet (KAZ)	Khushqadam Khusravov (TJK)	Aleksandr Kulikovskikh (RUS)
−64 kg	Rakhat Zhananiyet (KAZ)	Khushqadam Khusravov (TJK)	Pavel Hladkikh (BLR)
−71 kg	Nikita Kletskov (RUS)	Disqualified	Ramazan Kodzhakov (BHR)
−71 kg	Nikita Kletskov (RUS)	Disqualified	Vladislav Sayapin (BLR)
−79 kg	Uali Kurzhev (RUS)	Ulugbek Rakhmonov (UZB)	Nedir Allaberdiyev (TKM)
−79 kg	Uali Kurzhev (RUS)	Ulugbek Rakhmonov (UZB)	Aidyn Dartayev (KAZ)
−88 kg	Ikhtiyor Eshmurodov (UZB)	Sergei Ryabov (RUS)	Mohammad Reza Saeidi (IRI)
−88 kg	Ikhtiyor Eshmurodov (UZB)	Sergei Ryabov (RUS)	Dmytro Stetsenko (UKR)
−98 kg	Nodirjon Merhalikov (UZB)	Anton Konovalov (RUS)	Yaroslav Davydchuk (UKR)
−98 kg	Nodirjon Merhalikov (UZB)	Anton Konovalov (RUS)	Gerard Vanlier Ndam (CMR)
+98 kg	Artem Osipenko (RUS)	Alieksiei Moisieiev (UKR)	Daniel Natea (ROU)
+98 kg	Artem Osipenko (RUS)	Alieksiei Moisieiev (UKR)	Batsuuri Namsraijav (MGL)

Source Results

=== Women's events ===
Event	Gold	Silver	Bronze
−50 kg	Anfisa Kapaeva (BLR)	Sabina Davlatova (UZB)	Samara Abdumalik Kyzy (KGZ)
−50 kg	Anfisa Kapaeva (BLR)	Sabina Davlatova (UZB)	Mariya Molchanova (RUS)
−54 kg	Guldana Almukhanbetova (KAZ)	Bayarmaa Nekhiitbaatar (MGL)	Marina Zharskaya (BLR)
−54 kg	Guldana Almukhanbetova (KAZ)	Bayarmaa Nekhiitbaatar (MGL)	Aliya Bikkuzhina (RUS)
−59 kg	Tatsiana Matsko (BLR)	Svetlana Uvarova (RUS)	Ibodadxon Agajonova (UZB)
−59 kg	Tatsiana Matsko (BLR)	Svetlana Uvarova (RUS)	Boldoo Altangerel (MGL)
−65 kg	Yuliia Hrebenozhko (UKR)	Azhar Salykova (KAZ)	Sem Van Dun (NED)
−65 kg	Yuliia Hrebenozhko (UKR)	Azhar Salykova (KAZ)	Lucija Babic (CRO)
−72 kg	Alice Schlesinger (ISR)	Dildash Kuryshbayeva (KAZ)	Battsetseg Tsog-Ochir (MGL)
−72 kg	Alice Schlesinger (ISR)	Dildash Kuryshbayeva (KAZ)	Anastasiia Khomiachkova (RUS)
−80 kg	Sviatlana Tsimashenka (BLR)	Halyna Kovalska (UKR)	Mariya Oryashkova (BUL)
−80 kg	Sviatlana Tsimashenka (BLR)	Halyna Kovalska (UKR)	Ivana Jandric (SRB)
+80 kg	Olga Artoshina (RUS)	Anastasiia Komovych (UKR)	Elene Kebadze (GEO)
+80 kg	Olga Artoshina (RUS)	Anastasiia Komovych (UKR)	Mariya Kondratsyeva (BLR)

Source Results

=== Combat Sambo Events ===
Event	Gold	Silver	Bronze
−58 kg	Bakhodir Bakiev (UZB)	Aleksander Nesterov (RUS)	Serghei Shilov (MDA)
−58 kg	Bakhodir Bakiev (UZB)	Aleksander Nesterov (RUS)	Nurken Dombayev (KAZ)
−64 kg	Sheikh-Mansur Khabibulaev (RUS)	Oybek Soliev (UZB)	Adilbek Seissov (KAZ)
−64 kg	Sheikh-Mansur Khabibulaev (RUS)	Oybek Soliev (UZB)	Yauheni Mihno (BLR)
−71 kg	Ruslan Gasankhanov (RUS)	Zygimantas Ramaska (LTU)	Abdylla Babayev (TKM)
−71 kg	Ruslan Gasankhanov (RUS)	Zygimantas Ramaska (LTU)	Istam Kudratov (UZB)
−79 kg	Vladyslav Rudniev (UKR)	Furkat Ruziev (UZB)	Rusdem Penjiyev (TKM)
−79 kg	Vladyslav Rudniev (UKR)	Furkat Ruziev (UZB)	Tabrezsho Parpishoev (TJK)
−88 kg	Magomed Magomedov (RUS)	Sokhibjon Khasanboev (UZB)	Petro Davydenko (UKR)
−88 kg	Magomed Magomedov (RUS)	Sokhibjon Khasanboev (UZB)	Umar Yankovskiy (KAZ)
−98 kg	Rasul Magomedov (RUS)	Raikhan Madi (KAZ)	Jeremy Rodulfo (TRI)
−98 kg	Rasul Magomedov (RUS)	Raikhan Madi (KAZ)	Seidou Nji Mouluh (CMR)
+98 kg	Maxwell Djanou Nana (CMR)	Denis Goltsov (RUS)	Khakimjon Ismoilov (UZB)
+98 kg	Maxwell Djanou Nana (CMR)	Denis Goltsov (RUS)	Archi Wolfman (ISR)

Source Results

=== Medal table ===
* Host nation (Uzbekistan)

Rank	Nation	Gold	Silver	Bronze	Total
1	Russia (RUS)	8	6	4	18
2	Uzbekistan (UZB)*	3	5	3	11
3	Belarus (BLR)	3	0	5	8
4	Kazakhstan (KAZ)	2	3	5	10
5	Ukraine (UKR)	2	3	3	8
6	Tajikistan (TJK)	1	1	1	3
7	Cameroon (CMR)	1	0	2	3
8	Israel (ISR)	1	0	1	2
9	Mongolia (MGL)	0	1	3	4
10	Lithuania (LTU)	0	1	0	1
11	Turkmenistan (TKM)	0	0	3	3
12	Georgia (GEO)	0	0	2	2
13	Bahamas (BAH)	0	0	1	1
13	Bulgaria (BUL)	0	0	1	1
13	Croatia (CRO)	0	0	1	1
13	Iran (IRI)	0	0	1	1
13	Kyrgyzstan (KGZ)	0	0	1	1
13	Moldova (MDA)	0	0	1	1
13	Netherlands (NED)	0	0	1	1
13	Romania (ROU)	0	0	1	1
13	Serbia (SRB)	0	0	1	1
13	Trinidad and Tobago (TRI)	0	0	1	1
Totals (22 entries)		21	20	42	83
