= Gantömöriin Bayandüüren =

Mongolian martial artist (born 1996)

Personal information
- Nationality: Mongolia
- Born: 24 August 1996 (age 30) Bayan-Uul, Dornod Province, Mongolia
- Height: 1.69 m (5 ft 6 1/2 in)
- Weight: 58 kg (128 lb)

Sport
- Sport: Sambo
- Event: 58 kg
Medal record
Men's сombat sambo
Representing Mongolia
World Championships
Gold medal – first place	2022 Bishkek	58 kg
Gold medal – first place	2024 Astana	58 kg
Gold medal – first place	2026 Tashkent	58 kg
World Cup
Gold medal – first place	2025 Yerevan	58 kg

Gantömöriin Bayandüüren (Mongolian: Гантөмөрийн Баяндүүрэн; born August 24, 1996) is a Mongolian martial artist. Bayandüüren held a winner title for the 58 kg class at the World Combat Sambo Championships in 2022, 2024, 2026.

Bayandüüren was born into a family of nine children. He began practicing the sambo wrestling and Olympic judo in 2013, jiu-jitsu in 2016, combat sambo since 2017. He won a gold medal at the 2019 Asian Combat Sambo Championships. In 2022, he became the World Combat Sambo Champion in Bishkek, Kyrgyzstan. Bayandüüren then suffered an injury and took a break. After an year-long break, he returned to training and became the two-time World Combat Sambo Champion in Astana, Kazakhstan, in 2024. He also competes in MMA. Bayandüüren practices the martial arts at the Yangir Khairkhan club.
