= Sergej Grecicho =

Lithuanian sambist and MMA fighter

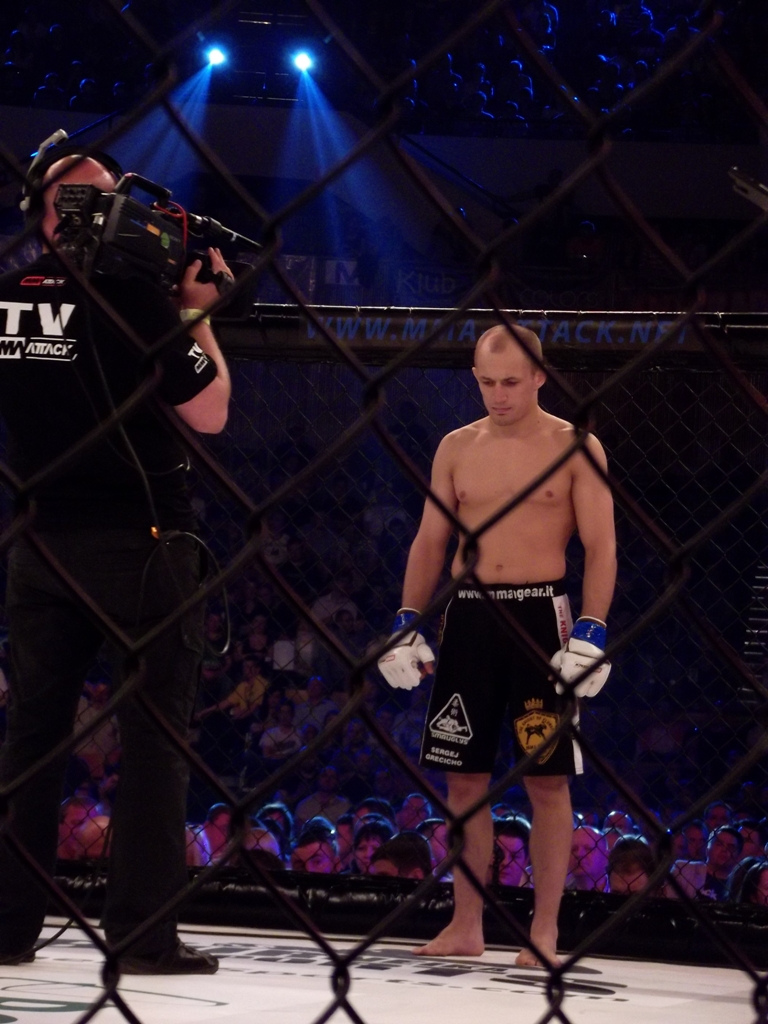
- Sergej Grecicho during MMA Attack 2 in Katowice, Poland
- Born: September 30, 1985 (age 41); Vilnius, Lithuanian SSR, Soviet Union
- Nationality: Lithuania
- Height: 1.75 m (5 ft 9 in)
- Weight: 145 lb (66 kg; 10.4 st)
- Division: Featherweight
- Style: Sambo
- Fighting out of: Vilnius, Lithuania
- Team: The Knight of Plunge
- Rank: Purple belt in Brazilian jiu-jitsu
- Years active: 2005–present

Mixed martial arts record
- Total: 37
- Wins: 25
- By knockout: 2
- By submission: 20
- By decision: 3
- Losses: 11
- By submission: 3
- By decision: 8
- Draws: 1

Other information
- Mixed martial arts record from Sherdog

Sergej Grecicho
Medal record

Men's Combat Sambo

Representing Lithuania

World Sambo Championships
Bronze medal – third place	2015 World Sambo Championships	68 kg
Gold medal – first place	2012 World Sambo Championships	62 kg
Silver medal – second place	2010 World Sambo Championships	68 kg
Gold medal – first place	2009 World Sambo Championships	68 kg
Bronze medal – third place	2008 World Sambo Championships	68 kg
Gold medal – first place	2007 World Sambo Championships	68 kg

Sergej Grecicho, or in Lithuanian Sergejus Grečicho, is a Lithuanian Combat Sambo practitioner, and mixed martial artist who has won six medals, three of them gold, in Combat Sambo divisions at the Sambo World Championships. He also was World Pankration Champion and was a runner-up at the European BJJ championships. He was honored at a ceremony by the mayor of Vilnius for his combat sambo world championships.

== Career ==
Sergej Grecicho began Sambo and grappling around at the age of 10 becoming competitive soon later and made his mixed martial arts debut in 2005. After building up a record of 11–5, he went on 9 fight win streak, moving up to 20–5 mostly winning by submission. S. Grecicho had entered into a contract with Bellator, but never fought there. He is under a contract with ACB right now.

== Mixed martial arts record ==
Professional record breakdown
37 matches	25 wins	11 losses
By knockout	2	0
By submission	20	3
By decision	3	8
Draws	1	

Res.	Record	Opponent	Method	Event	Date	Round	Time	Location	Notes
Loss	25-11-1	Ivan Buchinger	Submission (d'arce choke)	XFN 15	December 27, 2018	4	4:11	Prague, Czech Republic	For the X Fight Nights Featherweight Championship.
Loss	25-10-1	Alihan Suleimanov	Decision (Unanimous)	ACB 83: Borisov vs. Kerimov	March 24, 2018	3	5:00	Baku, Azerbaijan	
Win	25-9-1	Miroslav Strbak	Submission (heel hook)	STB: Simply The Best & Rebuy Stars Fight Night	October 14, 2017	3	4:05	Košice, Slovakia	
Win	24-9-1	Yusup Umarov	Submission (kneebar)	ACB 69: Young Eagles 22	September 9, 2017	2	1:34	Almaty, Kazakhstan	
Win	23-9-1	Jani Salmi	Submission (brabo choke)	Fight Night Finland 14	May 6, 2017	2	2:27	Turku, Finland	Lightweight bout.
Loss	22-9-1	Murad Machaev	Decision (unanimous)	Mix Fight Combat 4	December 25, 2015	3	5:00	Khimki, Russia	
Win	22-8-1	Jani Ridasmaa	Submission (brabo choke)	Lappeenranta Fight Night 14	November 28, 2015	2	1:51	Lappeenranta, South Karelia, Finland	Catchweight (162 lbs) bout.
Loss	21-8-1	Filip Wolanski	Decision (majority)	Incredible Fighting Night 1 - Let's Begin	October 24, 2015	3	5:00	Częstochowa, Poland	
Loss	21-7-1	Magomed Idrisov	Decision (unanimous)	M-1 Challenge 61 - Battle of Narts	September 20, 2015	3	5:00	Nazran, Ingushetia, Russia	Return to Featherweight.
Win	21-6-1	Antti Virtanen	Submission (heelhook)	Lappeenranta Fight Night 12	April 25, 2015	1	2:36	Lappeenranta, Finland	Catchweight (161 lbs) bout.
Loss	20-6-1	Anton Kuivanen	Decision (unanimous)	Cage 29	February 28, 2015	3	5:00	Helsinki, Finland	
Win	20-5-1	Jakub Kowalewicz	Decision (unanimous)	KSW 26: Materla vs. Silva 3	March 22, 2014	3	5:00	Warsaw, Poland	Lightweight debut.
Win	19-5-1	Rasul Albaskhanov	Submission (anaconda choke)	ACB 1: Grand Prix Berkut 2014	March 2, 2014	2	0:48	Grozny, Russia	
Win	18-5-1	Zokir Poechev	TKO (punches)	Oplot Challenge 98	February 1, 2014	2	2:10	Kharkov, Ukraine	
Win	17-5-1	Murad Zeinulabidov	Submission (rear naked choke)	Oplot Challenge 86	November 2, 2013	2	3:42	Kharkov, Ukraine	
Win	16-5-1	Jorgen Matsi	Submission (rear naked choke)	MMA Raju 12	October 19, 2013	3	2:22	Tartu, Estonia	Catchweight (148 lbs) bout.
Win	15-5-1	Rashid Aliev	Submission (d'arce choke)	Oplot Challenge 83	October 12, 2013	1	3:10	Kharkov, Ukraine	
Win	14-5-1	Artem Kazerskij	Submission (rear naked choke)	Real Fights 15	May 4, 2013	1	0:32	Vilnius, Lithuania	
Win	13-5-1	Joni Salovaara	Submission (rear naked choke)	Espoo Fight Night	May 5, 2012	1	N/A	Espoo, Finland	
Win	12-5-1	Sebastian Grabarek	Submission (rear naked choke)	MMA Attack 2	April 27, 2012	2	3:01	Katowice, Poland	
Loss	11-5-1	Niklas Bäckström	Decision (unanimous)	Botnia Punishment 11	March 23, 2012	3	5:00	Seinajoki, Finland	
Win	11-4-1	Oliver Pastor	Decision (unanimous)	OTP: On Top 4	February 25, 2012	3	5:00	Belfast, Northern Ireland	
Win	10-4-1	Magomed Muhumaev	Submission (triangle choke)	Baltic Challenge 2	July 1, 2011	1	1:32	Kaliningrad, Russia	
Win	9-4-1	Marcos Nardini	Decision (unanimous)	OTP: On Top 2	June 18, 2011	3	5:00	Glasgow, Scotland	
Loss	8-4-1	Tom Niinimäki	Decision (unanimious)	Cage 14: All Stars	November 20, 2010	3	5:00	Espoo, Finland	
Loss	8-3-1	Jason Young	Decision (unanimous)	Cage Warriors 38: Young Guns	October 1, 2010	3	5:00	London, England	
Win	8-2-1	Ville Yrjola	Submission (triangle choke)	Cage 13: Spring Break	May 8, 2010	1	0:46	Vantaa, Finland	
Win	7-2-1	Jerry Kvarnstrom	Submission (triangle choke)	Turku Fight: Resurrection	April 3, 2010	1	1:03	Turku, Finland	
Win	6-2-1	John Cullen	Submission (rear naked choke)	Eurofight Xtreme FC 1	October 17, 2009	1	0:35	Glasgow, Scotland	
Win	5-2-1	Juris Karpenko	Submission (rear naked choke)	Real Fights 4	December 12, 2008	1	0:48	Kaunas, Lithuania	
Win	4-2-1	Owen Roddy	Submission (achilles lock)	Ultimate Conflict 1	March 1, 2008	1	4:31	Dublin, Ireland	
Win	3-2-1	Olli Hartikainen	Submission (triangle choke)	Carelia Fight 3	September 1, 2007	2	1:45	Helsinki, Finland	
Loss	2-2-1	Arsen Timerkhanov	Submission (armbar)	K-1 Hero's Lithuania 2006	November 11, 2006	1	1:21	Vilnius, Lithuania	
Win	2-1-1	Masahiro Oishi	TKO (head kick and punches)	Zst 10	September 10, 2006	1	0:31	Tokyo, Japan	
Loss	1-1-1	Masayuki Okude	Submission (armbar)	Shooto Lithuania: Bushido	April 23, 2006	1	4:57	Vilnius, Lithuania	
Win	1-0-1	Povilas Alaburda	Submission (leglock)	Shooto Lithuania: Auksta Itampa 2	February 12, 2006	1	2:31	Kaunas, Lithuania	
Draw	0-0-1	Masayuki Okude	Draw	Zst 7	May 3, 2005	2	5:00	Tokyo, Japan	
