= Yancho Dimitrov =

Bulgarian martial artist

Yancho Dimitrov (Bulgarian: Янчо Димитров) is a Bulgarian combat samboist, kickboxer and mixed martial artist in the heavyweight division. He won 3rd place, over 100 kg on 2007 World Sambo Championships, was held in Prague, Czech Republic from 7 to 11 November 2007. Yancho lost in the semi-final to Fedor Emelianenko.
