= Irina Rodina =

Russian judoka and sambo practitioner

Irina Viktorovna Rodina Ири́на Ви́кторовна Родина
- Born: 23 July 1973 (age 53); Tula, Russian SFSR, Soviet Union
- Nationality: Russian
- Height: 5 ft 6 in (1.68 m)
- Weight: 227 lb (103 kg; 16.2 st)
- Division: Heavyweight
- Style: Sambo, Judo

Mixed martial arts record
- Total: 4
- Wins: 3
- By submission: 3
- Losses: 1
- By decision: 1

Other information
- Mixed martial arts record from Sherdog
- Judo career
- Weight class: +78 kg, Open

Judo achievements and titles
- Olympic Games: 7th (2000)
- World Champ.: R16 (1999, 2001, 2003)
- European Champ.: (gold) (1999)
Medal record
Representing Russia
Women's judo
European Championships
| Gold medal – first place | 1999 Bratislava | +78 kg |
| Silver medal – second place | 2000 Wrocław | +78 kg |
| Silver medal – second place | 2003 Düsseldorf | Open |
| Bronze medal – third place | 1993 Athens | Open |
| Bronze medal – third place | 1994 Gdansk | Open |
| Bronze medal – third place | 1996 The Hague | Open |
| Bronze medal – third place | 1998 Oviedo | Open |
| Bronze medal – third place | 2001 Paris | Open |
Women's sambo
World Championships
| Gold medal – first place | 1997 Tbilisi | +80 kg |
| Gold medal – first place | 1998 Kaliningrad | +80 kg |
| Gold medal – first place | 1999 Gijón | +80 kg |
| Gold medal – first place | 2001 Krasnoyarsk | +80 kg |
| Gold medal – first place | 2002 Panama City | +80 kg |
| Gold medal – first place | 2004 Chișinău | +80 kg |
| Gold medal – first place | 2005 Astana | +80 kg |
| Gold medal – first place | 2006 Sofia | +80 kg |
| Gold medal – first place | 2008 St. Petersburg | +80 kg |
| Gold medal – first place | 2009 Thessaloniki | +80 kg |
| Gold medal – first place | 2010 Tashkent | +80 kg |
| Bronze medal – third place | 2003 St. Petersburg | +80 kg |

Profile at external judo databases
- IJF: 13565
- JudoInside.com: 599

Irina Rodina (Russian: Ири́на Ви́кторовна Родина) (born 23 July 1973) is a Russian judoka and sambist. She is 11-time world champion of sambo making her the most titled female practitioner in sambo. She competed in Judo at the 2000 Summer Olympics in the heavyweight division, finishing in equal seventh place. Rodina also competed in mixed martial arts.

== Achievements ==
| Year | Tournament | Place | Weight class |
|---|---|---|---|
| 2006 | European Open Championships | 7th | Open class |
| 2004 | European Open Championships | 5th | Open class |
| 2003 | European Championships | 2nd | Open class |
| 2001 | European Championships | 3rd | Open class |
| 2000 | Olympic Games | 7th | Heavyweight (+78 kg) |
| 2000 | European Championships | 2nd | Heavyweight (+78 kg) |
| 1999 | European Championships | 1st | Heavyweight (+78 kg) |
| 1998 | European Championships | 3rd | Open class |
| 1997 | European Championships | 5th | Heavyweight (+72 kg) |
| 1996 | European Championships | 3rd | Open class |
| 1994 | European Championships | 3rd | Open class |
| 1993 | European Championships | 3rd | Open class |

== Mixed martial arts record ==
Professional record breakdown
| 4 matches | 3 wins | 1 loss |
| By submission | 3 | 0 |
| By decision | 0 | 1 |

| Res. | Record | Opponent | Method | Event | Date | Round | Time | Location | Notes |
|---|---|---|---|---|---|---|---|---|---|
| Loss | 3–1 | Erin Toughill | Decision (split) | ReMix – World Cup 2000 | December 5, 2000 | 2 | 5:00 | Japan | |
| Win | 3–0 | Yumiko Hotta | Submission (armbar) | UTT – Women's Vale Tudo Championship Finals | August 13, 1996 | 1 | 3:11 | Japan | |
| Win | 2–0 | Reggie Bennett | Submission (armbar) | UTT – Women's Vale Tudo Championship Finals | August 13, 1996 | 1 | 9:47 | Japan | |
| Win | 1–0 | Yoko Takahashi | Submission (armbar) | UTT – Women's Vale Tudo Championship Finals | August 12, 1996 | 1 | 6:06 | Japan | |
