= Elene Kebadze =

Georgian sambo practitioner and judoka

Elene Kebadze ელენე ქებაძე
- Born: April 1, 1994 (age 32)
- Style: Sambo

Elene Kebadze (Georgian: ელენე ქებაძე; born 1 April 1994) is a Georgian sambo practitioner and judoka.

== Career ==
=== Judo ===
As judoka she has participated World Cup Istanbul 2012, Grand Prix Tbilisi 2014, European Junior Championships 2014, European Club Championships 2015, European Open Sofia 2016, Grand Prix Tbilisi 2016, Tbilisi Grand Prix 2017, European Championships Seniors 2017, Minsk European Open 2017, World Senior Championship Budapest 2017, World Senior Championship Teams 2017, Tbilisi Grand Prix 2018.

=== Sambo ===
As a sambo practitioner, she has competed in -80 kg and +80 kg categories. In 2015, she won a silver medal at World Sambo Championships, lost final to Russian Anna Balashova (+80 kg).
