= Yury Rybak =

Belarusian judoka (born 1979)

Personal information
- Born: 6 March 1979 (age 47)
- Occupation: Judoka

Sport
- Country: Belarus
- Sport: Judo, Sambo
- Weight class: +100 kg, Open

Achievements and titles
- Olympic Games: 9th (2004)
- World Champ.: (silver) (2007)
- European Champ.: (bronze) (2003)
Medal record
Men's judo
Representing Belarus
World Championships
Silver medal – second place	2007 Rio de Janeiro	Open
Bronze medal – third place	2005 Cairo	Open
European Championships
Bronze medal – third place	2003 Düsseldorf	+100 kg
Men's sambo
European Games
Silver medal – second place	2019 Minsk	+100 kg
World Championships
Gold medal – first place	2007 Prague	+100 kg
Gold medal – first place	2012 Minsk	+100 kg
Silver medal – second place	2008 St. Petersburg	+100 kg
Bronze medal – third place	2006 Sofia	+100 kg

Profile at external databases
- IJF: 2846
- JudoInside.com: 12834
- Updated on 19 November 2022

Yury Rybak (born 6 March 1979) is a Belarusian judoka and sambist.

== Achievements ==
Year	Tournament	Place	Weight class
2012	World Sambo Championships	1st	Heavyweight (+100 kg)
2008	European Championships	5th	Heavyweight (+100 kg)
	2008 World Sambo Championships	2nd	Heavyweight (+100 kg)
2007	World Judo Championships	2nd	Open class
2007	European Championships	7th	Heavyweight (+100 kg)
2007	2007 World Sambo Championships	1st	Heavyweight (+100 kg)
2005	World Championships	3rd	Open class
2005	World Championships	5th	Half heavyweight (100 kg)
2005	European Championships	5th	Half heavyweight (100 kg)
2005	European Open Championships	7th	Open class
2003	European Championships	3rd	Heavyweight (+100 kg)
