= Vener Galiev =

Russian mixed martial artist (born 1975)

Vener Galiev Венер Галиев Венер Ғәлиев
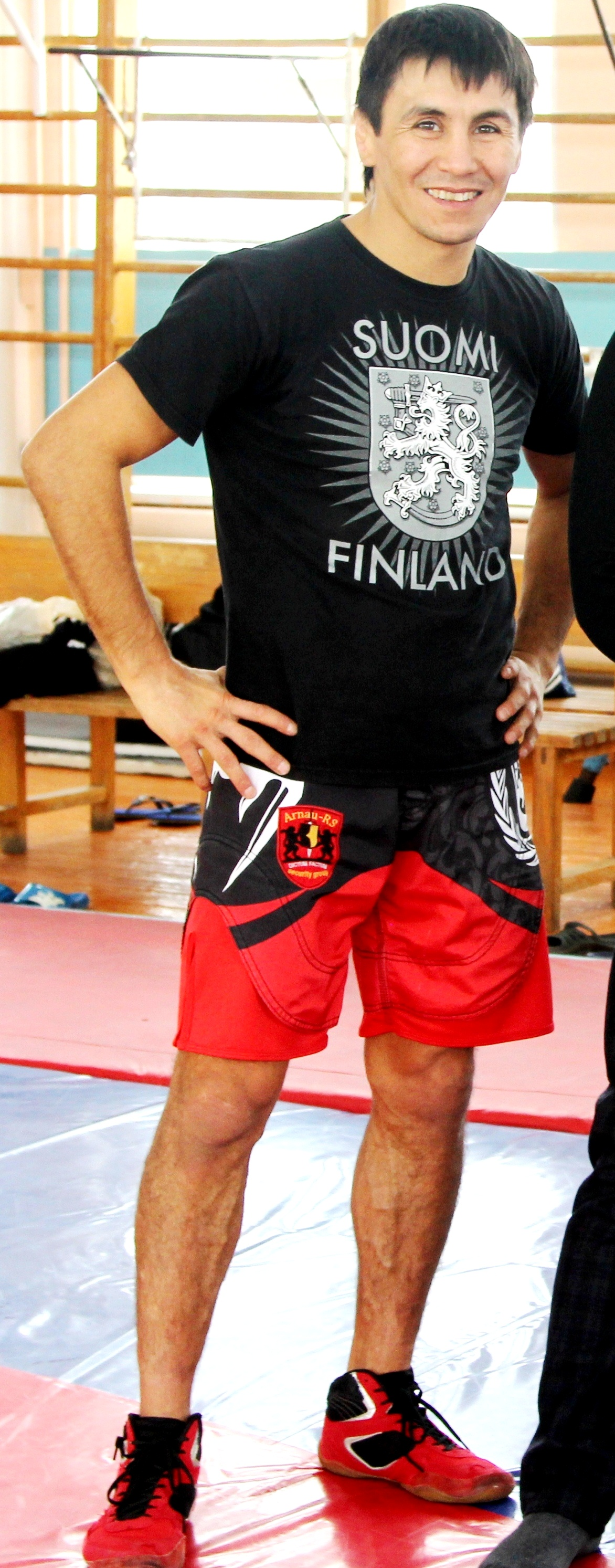
- Born: July 1, 1975 (age 51); Sterlitamak, Bashkir ASSR, Soviet Union
- Other names: Bashkir
- Nationality: Russian
- Height: 5 ft 9 in (1.75 m)
- Weight: 167 lb (76 kg; 11.9 st)
- Style: Combat Sambo, ARB
- Fighting out of: Ufa, Bashkortostan, Russia
- Team: RusFighters Sport Club
- Rank: Grand Master of Sports in Combat Sambo; International Master of Sports in Unifight; Master of Sports in Greco-Roman wrestling
- Years active: 2004–present

Mixed martial arts record
- Total: 53
- Wins: 38
- By knockout: 20
- By submission: 5
- By decision: 13
- Losses: 15
- By knockout: 7
- By submission: 3
- By decision: 5

Other information
- Mixed martial arts record from Sherdog

Vener Galiev
Medal record

Representing Russia

Combat Sambo

World Championships
Gold medal – first place	2008 St. Petersburg	74 kg
Gold medal – first place	2009 Thessaloniki	74 kg

Vener Zaynullovich Galiev (Russian: Венер Зайнуллович Галиев; Bashkir: Ғәлиев Венер Зәйнулла улы) born 1 July 1975) is a Russian amateur wrestler, sambist and mixed martial artist. He started his professional mixed martial arts career in 2004.

== Early life and martial arts career ==
Galiev was born to a working class Bashkir family and started his competitive sports career in Greco-Roman wrestling, becoming the Bashkortostan champion. He later participated in Combat Sambo and Unifight on the international level. Galiev became the Combat Sambo World Champion (74 kg) at 2008 World Sambo Championships and 2009 World Sambo Championships.

On 5 December 2009, he participated in the Combat Sambo rules category of the special event Bitva Chempionov IV of the Russian Martial Arts Association in Moscow and defeated the 2009 European Combat Sambo Champion Paul Lening of Germany by points. On 19 November 2010, Galiev faced Dagestan Kudo world champion (76 kg) and mixed martial artist Shamkhal Kerimov in an amateur MMA bout at Bitva Chempionov V in Moscow and defeated his opponent by split decision. On 5 November 2011, he participated in the event Bitva 5 held in Moscow and beat Roman Bagdasaryan in a bout under kickboxing rules.

Galiev holds International Class Master of Sports rank in Combat Sambo and Unifight, as well as Master of Sports rank in Greco-Roman wrestling.

== Personal life ==
Galiev works as a police lieutenant in Ufa. He is married to Alena and has a son named Timur.

== Championships and accomplishments ==
=== Unifight ===
- International Amateur Federation of Unifight
  - Unifight European Champion.

=== ARB (Army Hand-to-Hand Combat) ===
- Russian Union of Martial Arts
  - 3rd Place Russia Championship.

=== Sambo ===
- All-Russian Sambo Federation
  - Combat Sambo Russian National Champion.
  - Russian Combat Sambo National Championships 2nd Place (2010)
- Federation International Amateur de Sambo (FIAS)
  - Combat Sambo World Champion.

== Mixed martial arts record ==
Professional record breakdown
53 matches	38 wins	15 losses
By knockout	20	7
By submission	5	3
By decision	13	5

Res.	Record	Opponent	Method	Event	Date	Round	Time	Location	Notes
Win	38–15	Felipe Froes	KO (punches)	ACA 206	August 15, 2026	1	4:59	Moscow, Russia	Performance of the Night.
Win	37–15	Marat Balaev	TKO (punches)	ACA 195	November 7, 2025	1	4:27	Saint Petersburg, Russia	
Loss	36–15	Aurel Pîrtea	Decision (unanimous)	ACA 176	May 31, 2024	3	5:00	Ufa, Russia	
Win	36–14	Hacran Dias	TKO (punches)	ACA 167	December 8, 2023	1	1:20	Ufa, Russia	
Win	35–14	Levan Makashvili	TKO (punches)	ACA 156	April 28, 2023	1	1:39	Moscow, Russia	
Win	34–14	Denis Silva	Decision (unanimous)	ACA 148	November 18, 2022	3	5:00	Sochi, Russia	
Loss	33–14	Mukhamed Kokov	TKO (leg injury)	ACA 140	June 17, 2022	1	2:17	Sochi, Russia	
Win	33–13	Artem Damkovsky	Submission (arm-triangle choke)	ACA 134	December 17, 2021	3	4:00	Krasnodar, Russia	
Loss	32–13	Herdeson Batista	TKO (punches)	ACA 124	June 11, 2021	3	2:29	Kazan, Russia	
Win	32–12	Ermek Tlauov	TKO (punches)	ACA 116	December 18, 2020	2	3:47	Moscow, Russia	
Loss	31–12	Amirkhan Adaev	Decision (unanimous)	ACA 108	August 8, 2020	3	5:00	Grozny, Russia	
Win	31–11	Ermek Tlauov	TKO (punches)	ACA 102	November 29, 2019	2	1:38	Almaty, Kazakhstan	
Win	30–11	Fabio Ferrari	TKO (punches)	Mixfight Promotion: Ural Batyr	May 24, 2019	1	0:27	Ufa, Russia	
Loss	29–11	Diego Brandão	TKO (doctor stoppage)	RCC 5	December 15, 2018	1	0:50	Yekaterinburg, Russia	
Win	29–10	Nikolay Gaponov	KO (punches)	Fight Nights Global 82	December 16, 2017	1	4:14	Moscow, Russia	
Loss	28–10	Diego Brandão	KO (punches)	Fight Nights Global 67	May 25, 2017	1	0:39	Yekaterinburg, Russia	
Win	28–9	Marcio Andrade	KO (punch)	MixFace 1	December 3, 2016	1	2:50	Yekaterinburg, Russia	Return to Lightweight.
Loss	27–9	Akhmed Aliev	Decision (unanimous)	Fight Nights Global 51	September 25, 2016	3	5:00	Kaspiysk, Russia	Catchweight (161 lb) bout.
Win	27–8	Akop Stepanyan	Submission (rear-naked choke)	Fight Nights Global 45	April 22, 2016	3	3:16	Ufa, Russia	Catchweight (161 lb) bout.
Win	26–8	Akhmed Aliev	TKO (punches)	Fight Nights Global 41	September 25, 2015	2	4:59	Makhachkala, Russia	Catchweight (162 lb) bout.
Loss	25–8	Adil Boranbayev	KO (punch)	Alash Pride: Heroes of the Steppe	November 23, 2014	1	2:00	Almaty, Kazakhstan	
Win	25–7	Yoshiaki Takahashi	Decision (unanimous)	Global Fight Club 2	June 2, 2013	3	5:00	Krasnodar, Russia	
Win	24–7	Aziz Amuev	Decision (unanimous)	Union of Veterans: Commonwealth Cup 2012	December 8, 2012	3	5:00	Novosibirsk, Russia	
Win	23–7	Vaidas Valancius	Submission (guillotine choke)	ProFC 37: Global Grand Prix (Stage 5)	November 9, 2011	3	2:14	Ufa, Russia	Return to Welterweight.
Win	22–7	Tursunbeck Asilgazhiev	TKO (punches)	Fight Nights Global: Battle of Moscow 5	November 5, 2011	2	N/A	Moscow, Russia	Lightweight debut.
Win	21–7	Ian Jones	TKO (punches)	Desert Force 2	May 19, 2011	1	N/A	Amman, Jordan	
Win	20–7	Ryan Healy	TKO (punches)	Fight Festival 30	March 12, 2011	1	0:43	Helsinki, Finland	
Win	19–7	Gaël Grimaud	Decision (unanimous)	Universal Fighter: Fights With Rules 1	December 10, 2010	3	5:00	Ufa, Russia	
Win	18–7	Shamkhal Kerimov	Decision (split)	RMAU: Battle of the Champions 5	November 19, 2010	2	5:00	Moscow, Russia	
Loss	17–7	Shamil Zavurov	Decision (unanimous)	Fight Nights Global: Battle of Moscow 2	October 16, 2010	2	5:00	Moscow, Russia	FNG Welterweight Tournament Final.
Win	17–6	Artur Odilbekov	Submission (armbar)	Fight Nights Global: Battle of Moscow 2	October 16, 2010	1	N/A	Moscow, Russia	FNG Welterweight Tournament Semifinal.
Win	16–6	Mikko Suvanto	Decision (unanimous)	RMAU: Battle of the Champions 4	March 13, 2010	3	5:00	Helsinki, Finland	
Loss	15–6	Rustam Khabilov	Decision (split)	M-1: Russian Selection 2009 (Stage 4)	June 24, 2009	2	5:00	Saint Petersburg, Russia	
Win	15–5	Mairbek Taisumov	Decision (unanimous)	Gladiator 2009	May 23, 2009	2	5:00	Prague, Czech Republic	
Win	14–5	Bagavdin Gadzhimuradov	Decision (unanimous)	M-1: Russian Selection 2009 (Stage 2)	April 19, 2009	3	5:00	Saint Petersburg, Russia	
Loss	13–5	Josh Shockley	Submission (armbar)	FightFORCE 2	February 28, 2009	1	1:15	Saint Petersburg, Russia	Return to Welterweight.
Loss	13–4	Igor Araújo	Submission (armbar)	Universal Fighter: Gladiators Cup 3	December 12, 2008	1	0:57	Ufa, Russia	
Win	13–3	Okun Almaz	TKO (punches)	Union of Veterans: Russia vs. The World	November 29, 2008	1	1:27	Novosibirsk, Russia	Return to Middleweight.
Win	12–3	Seydina Seck	Decision (unanimous)	Siberian Challenge 2	May 18, 2008	3	5:00	Bratsk, Russia	
Win	11–3	Jaroslav Poborsky	TKO (knee and punches)	M-1: Emelianenko Cup 2008	May 15, 2008	1	0:52	Saint Petersburg, Russia	
Win	10–3	Mukhamed Aushev	Submission (guillotine choke)	FightFORCE 1	April 19, 2008	2	1:36	Saint Petersburg, Russia	Return to Welterweight.
Win	9–3	Roman Potapov	Decision (unanimous)	Star of Peresvit	December 7, 2007	3	5:00	Kyiv, Ukraine	
Win	8–3	Ivan Zagubinoga	Decision (unanimous)	Star of Peresvit	December 7, 2007	3	5:00	Kyiv, Ukraine	
Win	7–3	Rafael Silva	Decision (unanimous)	Star of Peresvit	December 7, 2007	3	5:00	Kyiv, Ukraine	
Loss	6–3	Djalili Salmanov	Submission (armbar)	MFP: Asian Championship 2007	November 23, 2007	1	N/A	Khabarovsk, Russia	MFP Middleweight Tournament Final.
Win	6–2	Rustam Bogatirev	KO (head kick)	MFP: Asian Championship 2007	November 23, 2007	1	3:30	Khabarovsk, Russia	MFP Middleweight Tournament Semifinal.
Win	5–2	Le Gou Lian	TKO (punches)	MFP: Asian Championship 2007	November 23, 2007	1	1:21	Khabarovsk, Russia	MFP Middleweight Tournament Quarterfinal.
Loss	4–2	Beslan Isaev	TKO (doctor stoppage)	APF: World Pankration Championship 2005	December 18, 2005	1	N/A	Astana, Kazakhstan	APF Middleweight Tournament Semifinal.
Loss	4–1	Alexander Shlemenko	TKO (injury)	IAFC: Challenge Cup 6	December 20, 2004	1	N/A	Ulyanovsk, Russia	IAFC Middleweight Tournament Final.
Win	4–0	Jeihun Aliev	TKO (punches)	IAFC: Challenge Cup 6	December 20, 2004	2	4:51	Ulyanovsk, Russia	IAFC Middleweight Tournament Semifinal.
Win	3–0	Sergei Kotin	TKO (punches)	IAFC: Challenge Cup 6	December 20, 2004	1	1:04	Ulyanovsk, Russia	IAFC Middleweight Tournament Quarterfinal.
Win	2–0	Alexander Shlemenko	Decision (unanimous)	Cup Of Empire 2004	March 18, 2004	3	5:00	Kazan, Russia	Middleweight debut.
Win	1–0	Magomed Magomedaliev	KO (punches)	IAFC: Challenge Cup 3	February 19, 2004	2	2:02	Omsk, Russia	Welterweight debut.

- Record confirmed through Sherdog.com and FightLife.ru
