= 2013 World Sambo Championships =

Sambo competitions

The 2013 World Sambo Championships was held in Saint Petersburg, Russia between the 21 and 25 November 2013. This tournament included competition in both Sambo, and Combat Sambo.

== Medal overview ==
=== Combat Sambo Events ===
Event	Gold	Silver	Bronze
Half-flyweight (52 kg)	Anatoly Shitshak (RUS)	Munkhbat Bayarsaikhan (MGL)	Asset Aldeshov (KAZ)
Half-flyweight (52 kg)	Anatoly Shitshak (RUS)	Munkhbat Bayarsaikhan (MGL)	Sergei Chornyi (UKR)
Flyweight (57 kg)	Marko Kosev (BUL)	Karim Allanurov (TJK)	Aleksey Ebechekov (RUS)
Flyweight (57 kg)	Marko Kosev (BUL)	Karim Allanurov (TJK)	Kazbet Supygaliev (KAZ)
Half-lightweight (62 kg)	Imram Dzhavadov (RUS)	Igor Severin (UKR)	Veselin Ivanov (BUL)
Half-lightweight (62 kg)	Imram Dzhavadov (RUS)	Igor Severin (UKR)	Damlanpurev Baasankhuu (MGL)
Lightweight (68 kg)	Arman Ospanov (KAZ)	Ruslan Gasankhanov (RUS)	Vadim Zeleniuk (UKR)
Lightweight (68 kg)	Arman Ospanov (KAZ)	Ruslan Gasankhanov (RUS)	Abdynazar Kupuev (KGZ)
Welterweight (74 kg)	Shamil Gasankhanov (RUS)	Istam Kudratov (UZB)	Mavrik Nasibyan (ARM)
Welterweight (74 kg)	Shamil Gasankhanov (RUS)	Istam Kudratov (UZB)	Rustem Seydaliyev (UKR)
Half-middleweight (82 kg)	Murad Kerimov (RUS)	Oleksandr Turovyski (UKR)	Siarhei Filomenka (BLR)
Half-middleweight (82 kg)	Murad Kerimov (RUS)	Oleksandr Turovyski (UKR)	Kurmanbek Adil Uullu (KGZ)
Middleweight (90 kg)	Vyacheslav Vasilevsky (RUS)	Raman Yarmaliuk (BLR)	Sebastian Libebe (FRA)
Middleweight (90 kg)	Vyacheslav Vasilevsky (RUS)	Raman Yarmaliuk (BLR)	Sergey Afanessenko (KAZ)
Half-heavyweight (100 kg)	Pavel Lyssenko (KAZ)	Stanislau Kalbasau (BLR)	Vadim Nemkov (RUS)
Half-heavyweight (100 kg)	Pavel Lyssenko (KAZ)	Stanislau Kalbasau (BLR)	Igor Zadernovskyi (UKR)
Heavyweight (+100 kg)	Kirill Sidelnikov (RUS)	Ruslan Aushev (KAZ)	Martin Marinkov (BUL)
Heavyweight (+100 kg)	Kirill Sidelnikov (RUS)	Ruslan Aushev (KAZ)	Dmitri Gorash (MDA)

=== Men's Sambo Events ===
Event	Gold	Silver	Bronze
Half-flyweight (52 kg)	Igor Beglerov (RUS)	Shavkat Juraev (BLR)	Tigran Kirakosyan (ARM)
Half-flyweight (52 kg)	Igor Beglerov (RUS)	Shavkat Juraev (BLR)	Almas Suleimenov (GEO)
Flyweight (57 kg)	Vakhtangi Chidrashvili (GEO)	Ivan Aniskevich (BLR)	Aimergen Atkunov (RUS)
Flyweight (57 kg)	Vakhtangi Chidrashvili (GEO)	Ivan Aniskevich (BLR)	Islam Gasumov (AZE)
Half-lightweight (62 kg)	Ilya Khlybov (RUS)	Andriy Kazhtanov (KAZ)	Davlatjon Khamroev (UZB)
Half-lightweight (62 kg)	Ilya Khlybov (RUS)	Andriy Kazhtanov (KAZ)	Javidan Garayev (AZE)
Lightweight (68 kg)	Levan Nakhutsrishvili (GEO)	Martin Ivanov (BUL)	Davaadorjiin Tömörkhüleg (MGL)
Lightweight (68 kg)	Levan Nakhutsrishvili (GEO)	Martin Ivanov (BUL)	Denis Davydov (RUS)
Low-middleweight (74 kg)	Stsiapan Papou (BLR)	Khashbaataryn Tsagaanbaatar (MGL)	Ali Kurzhev (RUS)
Low-middleweight (74 kg)	Stsiapan Papou (BLR)	Khashbaataryn Tsagaanbaatar (MGL)	Kakha Mamulashvili (GEO)
Half-middleweight (82 kg)	Ashtot Danielyan (ARM)	Sergey Ryabov (RUS)	Ivalyo Ivanov (BUL)
Half-middleweight (82 kg)	Ashtot Danielyan (ARM)	Sergey Ryabov (RUS)	Otgonbaataryn Uuganbaatar (MGL)
Middleweight (90 kg)	Arsen Khandzhian (RUS)	Ivan Vasylchuk (UKR)	Komronshah Ustopiriyon (TJK)
Middleweight (90 kg)	Arsen Khandzhian (RUS)	Ivan Vasylchuk (UKR)	Andrei Kazusenok (BLR)
Half-heavyweight (100 kg)	Vyacheslav Mikhaylin (RUS)	Lasha Guruli (GEO)	Vasili Kuzniatsou (BLR)
Half-heavyweight (100 kg)	Vyacheslav Mikhaylin (RUS)	Lasha Guruli (GEO)	Daniel Dichev (BUL)
Heavyweight (+100 kg)	Evgeney Isaev (RUS)	Aleksandr Vakhaviak (BLR)	Nodar Metreveli (GEO)
Heavyweight (+100 kg)	Evgeney Isaev (RUS)	Aleksandr Vakhaviak (BLR)	Ivan Iliev (BUL)

=== Women's events ===
Event	Gold	Silver	Bronze
Extra-lightweight (48 kg)	Mariya Molchanova (RUS)	Leila Abbasova (BLR)	Yerjanik Karapetyan (ARM)
Extra-lightweight (48 kg)	Mariya Molchanova (RUS)	Leila Abbasova (BLR)	Maria Guedez (VEN)
Half-lightweight (52 kg)	Anna Kharitonova (RUS)	Magdalena Varbanova (BUL)	Sose Balasnyan (ARM)
Half-lightweight (52 kg)	Anna Kharitonova (RUS)	Magdalena Varbanova (BUL)	Maryna Zharskaya (BLR)
Lightweight (56 kg)	Dorjsürengiin Sumiya (MGL)	Kalina Stefanova (BUL)	Tatyana Zhenchenko (RUS)
Lightweight (56 kg)	Dorjsürengiin Sumiya (MGL)	Kalina Stefanova (BUL)	Anastasia Arkhipava (BLR)
Welterweight (60 kg)	Yana Kostenko (RUS)	Katsiyaryna Prakapenka (BLR)	Gergana Vatsova (BUL)
Welterweight (60 kg)	Yana Kostenko (RUS)	Katsiyaryna Prakapenka (BLR)	Olena Sayko (UKR)
Half-middleweight (64 kg)	Alice Schlesinger (ISR)	Olga Medvedeva (RUS)	Tümen-Odyn Battögs (MGL)
Half-middleweight (64 kg)	Alice Schlesinger (ISR)	Olga Medvedeva (RUS)	Johanna Ylinen (FIN)
Middleweight (68 kg)	Marina Mokhnatkina (RUS)	Luiza Gainutdinova (UKR)	Volha Namazava (BLR)
Middleweight (68 kg)	Marina Mokhnatkina (RUS)	Luiza Gainutdinova (UKR)	Dildash Kuryshbayeva (KAZ)
Super-middleweight (72 kg)	Tetyana Savenko (UKR)	Tui Takahashi (JPN)	Anzhela Marozava (BLR)
Super-middleweight (72 kg)	Tetyana Savenko (UKR)	Tui Takahashi (JPN)	Olga Zakharcova (RUS)
Half-heavyweight (80 kg)	Maryna Pryshchepa (UKR)	Mariya Oryashkova (BLR)	Sviatlana Tsimashenka (BUL)
Half-heavyweight (80 kg)	Maryna Pryshchepa (UKR)	Mariya Oryashkova (BLR)	Natalia Kazanceva (RUS)
Heavyweight (+80 kg)	Svitlana Yaromka (UKR)	Anna Balashova (RUS)	Irine Leonidze (GEO)
Heavyweight (+80 kg)	Svitlana Yaromka (UKR)	Anna Balashova (RUS)	Teresa Djurova (BUL)

=== Medal table ===
Rank	Nation	Gold	Silver	Bronze	Total
1	Russia	16	3	8	27
2	Ukraine	3	4	5	12
3	Kazakhstan	2	2	4	8
4	Georgia	2	1	4	7
5	Belarus	1	8	7	16
6	Bulgaria	1	3	8	12
7	Mongolia	1	2	4	7
8	Armenia	1	1	3	5
9	Tajikistan	0	1	1	2
9	Uzbekistan	0	1	1	2
11	Israel	0	1	0	1
11	Japan	0	1	0	1
13	Azerbaijan	0	0	2	2
13	Kyrgyzstan	0	0	2	2
15	Finland	0	0	1	1
15	France	0	0	1	1
15	Moldova	0	0	1	1
15	Venezuela	0	0	1	1
Totals (18 entries)		27	28	53	108
