= 2020 World Sambo Championships =

Sambo competitions

- Venue: SPENS
- Location: Novi Sad
- Dates: 4–8 November 2020
- Competitors: 400 from 30 nations

The 2020 World Sambo Championships were held in Novi Sad, Serbia from 4 to 8 November 2020.

This tournament, marking the 82nd of its kind, included 9 weight categories and three disciplines; men's and women's sambo and combat sambo. Due to the COVID-19 pandemic, only around 400 athletes from 30 countries participated this time.

== Medal table ==
Host nation

Rank	Nation	Gold	Silver	Bronze	Total
1	Russia	17	4	4	25
2	Belarus	3	5	5	13
3	Ukraine	2	7	10	19
4	Uzbekistan	2	4	4	10
5	Bulgaria	1	1	2	4
5	Romania	1	1	2	4
7	Cameroon	1	0	1	2
8	Kyrgyzstan	0	2	4	6
9	France	0	1	6	7
10	Tajikistan	0	1	2	3
11	Kazakhstan	0	1	0	1
12	Spain	0	0	3	3
13	Lithuania	0	0	2	2
13	Serbia*	0	0	2	2
15	Greece	0	0	1	1
15	Italy	0	0	1	1
15	Moldova	0	0	1	1
15	Philippines	0	0	1	1
15	Venezuela	0	0	1	1
Totals (19 entries)		27	27	52	106

== Medal overview ==
=== Sambo events ===
==== Men ====
Event	Gold	Silver	Bronze
–52 kg	Andrey Kubarkov; Russia	Imanbek Tentiev; Kyrgyzstan	Grachyk Osypian; Ukraine
–52 kg	Andrey Kubarkov; Russia	Imanbek Tentiev; Kyrgyzstan	none
–57 kg	Vladimir Gladikh; Russia	Akmaliddin Karimov; Tajikistan	Andrii Laishchuk; Ukraine
–57 kg	Vladimir Gladikh; Russia	Akmaliddin Karimov; Tajikistan	Uladzislau Burdz; Belarus
–62 kg	Davlatjon Khamroev; Uzbekistan	Aleksandr Matais; Russia	Khushqadam Khusravov; Tajikistan
–62 kg	Davlatjon Khamroev; Uzbekistan	Aleksandr Matais; Russia	Ivan Aniskevich; Belarus
–68 kg	Nikita Kletskov; Russia	Uladzislau Sayapin; Belarus	Mattia Galbiati; Italy
–68 kg	Nikita Kletskov; Russia	Uladzislau Sayapin; Belarus	Angel Angelov; Bulgaria
–74 kg	Aliaksandr Koksha; Belarus	Bislan Nadiukov; Russia	Gejrgios Markarian; Greece
–74 kg	Aliaksandr Koksha; Belarus	Bislan Nadiukov; Russia	Sarbon Ernazarov; Uzbekistan
–82 kg	Samvel Kazarian; Russia	Dmitro Stetsenko; Ukraine	Tsimafei Yemelyanau; Belarus
–82 kg	Samvel Kazarian; Russia	Dmitro Stetsenko; Ukraine	Ulugbek Rakhmonov; Uzbekistan
–90 kg	Sergey Ryabov; Russia	Nemat Yokubov; Uzbekistan	Komronhokh Ustopiriyon; Tajikistan
–90 kg	Sergey Ryabov; Russia	Nemat Yokubov; Uzbekistan	Aliaksei Stsepankou; Belarus
–100 kg	Andrei Kazusionak; Belarus	Viachslav Mikhaylin; Russia	Andrii Boloban; Ukraine
–100 kg	Andrei Kazusionak; Belarus	Viachslav Mikhaylin; Russia	Antony Segard; France
+100 kg	Artem Osipenko; Russia	Dzmitry Khakhlou; Belarus	Vladimir Gajic; Serbia
+100 kg	Artem Osipenko; Russia	Dzmitry Khakhlou; Belarus	Ilie Daniel Natea; Romania

==== Women ====
Event	Gold	Silver	Bronze
–48 kg	Elena Bondareva; Russia	Alina Pashuk; Ukraine	Cristina Casas; Spain
–48 kg	Elena Bondareva; Russia	Alina Pashuk; Ukraine	Maria Guedez; Venezuela
–52 kg	Vera Lotkova; Russia	Mariia Buiok; Ukraine	Samara Abdumalik Kyzy; Kyrgyzstan
–52 kg	Vera Lotkova; Russia	Mariia Buiok; Ukraine	Gulnoza Ziyaeva; Uzbekistan
–56 kg	Anastasia Valova; Russia	Daniela Poroineanu; Romania	Khrystyna Bondar; Ukraine
–56 kg	Anastasia Valova; Russia	Daniela Poroineanu; Romania	Samantha Le Cocguen; France
–60 kg	Gulfia Mukhtarova; Russia	Ibodatkhow Agoyonova; Uzbekistan	Sabina Artemciuc; Moldova
–60 kg	Gulfia Mukhtarova; Russia	Ibodatkhow Agoyonova; Uzbekistan	Yaiza Jimenez; Spain
–64 kg	Anastasiya Shevchenko; Ukraine	Vera Harelikava; Belarus	Laetitia Blot; France
–64 kg	Anastasiya Shevchenko; Ukraine	Vera Harelikava; Belarus	Ekaterina Onoprienko; Russia
–68 kg	Volha Maleika; Romania	Nastassia Skvartsova; Belarus	Kateryna Moskalova; Ukraine
–68 kg	Volha Maleika; Romania	Nastassia Skvartsova; Belarus	Anastasia Philippovich; Russia
–72 kg	Anzhela Zhilinskaya; Belarus	Nataliya Smal; Ukraine	Mathilde Clement; France
–72 kg	Anzhela Zhilinskaya; Belarus	Nataliya Smal; Ukraine	Tatyana Zenchenko; Russia
–80 kg	Mariya Oriashkova; Bulgaria	Sviatlana Tsimashenka; Belarus	Zhanara Kusanova; Russia
–80 kg	Mariya Oriashkova; Bulgaria	Sviatlana Tsimashenka; Belarus	Lavinia Florentina Ionescu; Romania
+80 kg	Olga Artoshina; Russia	Vasylyna-Iryna Kyrychenko; Ukraine	Sydney Sy; Philippines
+80 kg	Olga Artoshina; Russia	Vasylyna-Iryna Kyrychenko; Ukraine	Gabriela Gigova; Bulgaria

=== Combat Sambo events ===
Event	Gold	Silver	Bronze
–52 kg	Vladimir Lamanov; Russia	Yerkebulan Kuangaliyev; Kazakhstan	Aaron Aneiros; Spain
–52 kg	Vladimir Lamanov; Russia	Yerkebulan Kuangaliyev; Kazakhstan	Dilshod Gadoev; Uzbekistan
–57 kg	Mukhtar Gamzaev; Russia	Lutfilla Saydamatov; Uzbekistan	Maximilien Vallot; France
–57 kg	Mukhtar Gamzaev; Russia	Lutfilla Saydamatov; Uzbekistan	Bohdan Babenko; Ukraine
–62 kg	Bakhodir Bokiev; Uzbekistan	Alexander Salikov; Russia	Oleksandr Voropaiev; Ukraine
–62 kg	Bakhodir Bokiev; Uzbekistan	Alexander Salikov; Russia	Mederbek Saparbek Uulu; Kyrgyzstan
–68 kg	Sheih-Mansur Habibulaev; Russia	Emil Nezirov; Bulgaria	Andrii Kucherenko; Ukraine
–68 kg	Sheih-Mansur Habibulaev; Russia	Emil Nezirov; Bulgaria	Siarhei Kapylou; Belarus
–74 kg	Vladyslav Rudniev; Ukraine	Daiyrbek Karyiaev; Kyrgyzstan	Charly Schmitt; France
–74 kg	Vladyslav Rudniev; Ukraine	Daiyrbek Karyiaev; Kyrgyzstan	none
–82 kg	Alexey Ivanov; Russia	Furkat Ruziev; Uzbekistan	Vadym Burchak; Ukraine
–82 kg	Alexey Ivanov; Russia	Furkat Ruziev; Uzbekistan	Nurisbek Bekberdiev; Kyrgyzstan
–90 kg	Sultan Aliev; Russia	Louis Laurent; France	Petro Davydenko; Ukraine
–90 kg	Sultan Aliev; Russia	Louis Laurent; France	Elaman Genzhebaev; Kyrgyzstan
–100 kg	Seidou Nji Mouluh; Cameroon	Anatolii Voloshynov; Ukraine	Teodoras Aukštuolis; Lithuania
–100 kg	Seidou Nji Mouluh; Cameroon	Anatolii Voloshynov; Ukraine	Dragan Begovic; Serbia
+100 kg	Valentin Moldavsky; Russia	Razmik Tonoian; Ukraine	Eimantas Vaikasas; Lithuania
+100 kg	Valentin Moldavsky; Russia	Razmik Tonoian; Ukraine	Maxwell Djantou Nana; Cameroon
