= 2008 World Sambo Championships =

Sambo competitions

- Location: St.Petersburg
- Dates: 13–17 November

The 2008 World Sambo Championships was held in St. Petersburg, Russia on 13 to 17 of November, 2008. This tournament included competition in both sport Sambo, and Combat Sambo.

== Categories ==
- Combat Sambo: 52 kg, 57 kg, 62 kg, 68 kg, 74 kg, 82 kg, 90 kg, 100 kg, +100 kg
- Men's Sambo: 52 kg, 57 kg, 62 kg, 68 kg, 74 kg, 82 kg, 90 kg, 100 kg, +100 kg
- Women's Sambo: 48 kg, 52 kg, 56 kg, 60 kg, 64 kg, 68 kg, 72 kg, 80 kg, +80 kg

== Medal overview ==
=== Combat Sambo events ===
Event	Gold	Silver	Bronze
Half-flyweight (52 kg)	Anatoli Shitsak (RUS)	Almaz Suliemanov (UZB)	Sergii Chornyi (UKR)
Half-flyweight (52 kg)	Anatoli Shitsak (RUS)	Almaz Suliemanov (UZB)	Vahe Otarjan (ARM)
Flyweight (57 kg)	Denis Emelyukov (RUS)	Edgar Borger (VEN)	Karim Mukadov (LTU)
Flyweight (57 kg)	Denis Emelyukov (RUS)	Edgar Borger (VEN)	Marko Kosev (BUL)
Half-lightweight (62 kg)	Ivan Davidenko (RUS)	Baasankhun Damlanpurev (MGL)	Artemij Sitenkov (LTU)
Half-lightweight (62 kg)	Ivan Davidenko (RUS)	Baasankhun Damlanpurev (MGL)	Igor Severin (UKR)
Lightweight (68 kg)	Murat Ristov (RUS)	Vachik Vardanyan (ARM)	Ozod Pardaev (UZB)
Lightweight (68 kg)	Murat Ristov (RUS)	Vachik Vardanyan (ARM)	Sergej Grecicho (LTU)
Welterweight (74 kg)	Vener Galiev (RUS)	Viktor Tomashevic (LTU)	Alexander Fedorov (EST)
Welterweight (74 kg)	Vener Galiev (RUS)	Viktor Tomashevic (LTU)	Tougol Arapbaj Uulu (UZB)
Half-middleweight (82 kg)	Andrey Safyanenko (RUS)	Rosen Dimitrov (BUL)	David Grigoryan (ARM)
Half-middleweight (82 kg)	Andrey Safyanenko (RUS)	Rosen Dimitrov (BUL)	Darius Stankevichius (LTU)
Middleweight (90 kg)	Mikhail Zayats (RUS)	Eldor Gujamov (UZB)	Rumen Dimitrov (BUL)
Middleweight (90 kg)	Mikhail Zayats (RUS)	Eldor Gujamov (UZB)	Georgy Yemelanov (KAZ)
Half-heavyweight (100 kg)	Dmitiri Zabolotnyi (RUS)	Sebastian Lebebe (FRA)	Vladimir Dzhih (UKR)
Half-heavyweight (100 kg)	Dmitiri Zabolotnyi (RUS)	Sebastian Lebebe (FRA)	Zarif Rasulov (UZB)
Heavyweight (+100 kg)	Blagoi Ivanov (BUL)	Janosch Stefan (GER)	Fedor Emelianenko (RUS)
Heavyweight (+100 kg)	Blagoi Ivanov (BUL)	Janosch Stefan (GER)	Vladimir Bezegev (UKR)

=== Men's Sambo events ===
Event	Gold	Silver	Bronze
Half-flyweight (52 kg)	Yerbolat Baibatirov (KAZ)	Valeriy Soronokov (RUS)	Islam Qasimov (AZE)
Half-flyweight (52 kg)	Yerbolat Baibatirov (KAZ)	Valeriy Soronokov (RUS)	Andrei Kurlypa (BLR)
Flyweight (57 kg)	Anton Mashkovich (BLR)	Oleksey Poltavtsev (UKR)	Timur Gallymov (RUS)
Flyweight (57 kg)	Anton Mashkovich (BLR)	Oleksey Poltavtsev (UKR)	Vahan Vardanyan (ARM)
Half-lightweight (62 kg)	Ilea Khlybov (RUS)	Andrey Kashtanov (UKR)	Hidehiko Matsumoto (JPN)
Half-lightweight (62 kg)	Ilea Khlybov (RUS)	Andrey Kashtanov (UKR)	Azamat Mykanov (KAZ)
Lightweight (68 kg)	Sergei Shibanov (RUS)	Damir Muhidov (UZB)	Dmitriy Babiychuk (UKR)
Lightweight (68 kg)	Sergei Shibanov (RUS)	Damir Muhidov (UZB)	Luis Adriansa (VEN)
Low-middleweight (74 kg)	Viktor Savinov (UKR)	Aleksander Sharov (RUS)	Georgi Georgiev (BUL)
Low-middleweight (74 kg)	Viktor Savinov (UKR)	Aleksander Sharov (RUS)	Araz Muxtarov (AZE)
Half-middleweight (82 kg)	Rais Rakhmatullin (RUS)	Magomed Abdulganilov (BLR)	Akram Ishov (UZB)
Half-middleweight (82 kg)	Rais Rakhmatullin (RUS)	Magomed Abdulganilov (BLR)	Vladimir Goloven (UKR)
Middleweight (90 kg)	Andrei Kazusionak (BLR)	Munkhbaysgalan Dorjdermen (MGL)	Eduard Kurginyan (ARM)
Middleweight (90 kg)	Andrei Kazusionak (BLR)	Munkhbaysgalan Dorjdermen (MGL)	Sanmartin Echarte (ESP)
Half-heavyweight (100 kg)	Evgeniy Isaev (RUS)	Yauhen Biadulin (BLR)	Shinji Taya (JPN)
Half-heavyweight (100 kg)	Evgeniy Isaev (RUS)	Yauhen Biadulin (BLR)	Nabimykhamat Khorkashev (TJK)
Heavyweight (+100 kg)	Vitaly Minakov (RUS)	Yury Rybak (BLR)	Ivan Iliev (BUL)
Heavyweight (+100 kg)	Vitaly Minakov (RUS)	Yury Rybak (BLR)	Munkhbaatar Khadbaatar (MGL)

=== Women's events ===
Event	Gold	Silver	Bronze
Extra-lightweight (48 kg)	Elena Bondareva (RUS)	Kelbet Nugazina (KAZ)	Nomin Erdenechime (MGL)
Extra-lightweight (48 kg)	Elena Bondareva (RUS)	Kelbet Nugazina (KAZ)	Tatiana Moskvina (BLR)
Half-lightweight (52 kg)	Sneljina Vasileva (BUL)	Luisaigna Campos (VEN)	Lenaniya Mingaqzova (KAZ)
Half-lightweight (52 kg)	Sneljina Vasileva (BUL)	Luisaigna Campos (VEN)	Susanna Mirzoyan (RUS)
Lightweight (56 kg)	Natalia Aranovoskaya (RUS)	Elitsa Razheva (BUL)	Sayaka Shioda (JPN)
Lightweight (56 kg)	Natalia Aranovoskaya (RUS)	Elitsa Razheva (BUL)	Heriman Rodrigueza (VEN)
Welterweight (60 kg)	Mariya Yancheva (BUL)	Yanquelina Lopez (VEN)	Arina Pchelintseva (RUS)
Welterweight (60 kg)	Mariya Yancheva (BUL)	Yanquelina Lopez (VEN)	Katsiarina Prakapenka (LTU)
Half-middleweight (64 kg)	Ekaterina Goldberg (RUS)	Adriana Cherar (ROU)	Alina Boikova (UKR)
Half-middleweight (64 kg)	Ekaterina Goldberg (RUS)	Adriana Cherar (ROU)	Saynzhargal Batbataar (MGL)
Middleweight (68 kg)	Evija Pukite (LAT)	Marina Baranov (RUS)	Luiza Gainutdinova (UKR)
Middleweight (68 kg)	Evija Pukite (LAT)	Marina Baranov (RUS)	Nasiba Surkieva (TKM)
Super-middleweight (72 kg)	Svetlana Galantr (RUS)	Maryia Kuzniatsova (BLR)	Natalia Smal (UKR)
Super-middleweight (72 kg)	Svetlana Galantr (RUS)	Maryia Kuzniatsova (BLR)	Nevenka Chopovic (SRB)
Half-heavyweight (80 kg)	Mariya Oryashkova (BUL)	Anna Subbotina (RUS)	Dulmaa Yadmaa (MGL)
Half-heavyweight (80 kg)	Mariya Oryashkova (BUL)	Anna Subbotina (RUS)	Marina Prischepa (UKR)
Heavyweight (+80 kg)	Irina Rodina (RUS)	Natalia Melnikava (BUL)	Angelika Sopp (EST)
Heavyweight (+80 kg)	Irina Rodina (RUS)	Natalia Melnikava (BUL)	Santa Pakenyte (LTU)

=== Medal table ===
Rank	Nation	Gold	Silver	Bronze	Total
1	Russia	17	5	5	27
2	Bulgaria	5	2	3	10
3	Belarus	2	4	2	8
4	Ukraine	1	2	11	14
5	Kazakhstan	1	1	3	5
6	Latvia	1	0	0	1
7	Uzbekistan	0	3	4	7
8	Venezuela	0	3	3	6
9	Mongolia	0	2	4	6
10	Lithuania	0	1	6	7
11	Armenia	0	1	4	5
12	France	0	1	0	1
12	Germany	0	1	0	1
12	Romania	0	1	0	1
15	Japan	0	0	3	3
16	Azerbaijan	0	0	2	2
16	Estonia	0	0	2	2
18	Serbia	0	0	1	1
18	Spain	0	0	1	1
18	Tajikistan	0	0	1	1
18	Turkmenistan	0	0	1	1
22	Algeria	0	0	0	0
22	Austria	0	0	0	0
22	Belgium	0	0	0	0
22	Cameroon	0	0	0	0
22	Canada	0	0	0	0
22	Colombia	0	0	0	0
22	Cyprus	0	0	0	0
22	Czech Republic	0	0	0	0
22	Ecuador	0	0	0	0
22	Finland	0	0	0	0
22	Great Britain	0	0	0	0
22	India	0	0	0	0
22	Indonesia	0	0	0	0
22	Ireland	0	0	0	0
22	Israel	0	0	0	0
22	Italy	0	0	0	0
22	Jordan	0	0	0	0
22	Kyrgyzstan	0	0	0	0
22	Lebanon	0	0	0	0
22	Malaysia	0	0	0	0
22	Moldova	0	0	0	0
22	Morocco	0	0	0	0
22	Nepal	0	0	0	0
22	New Zealand	0	0	0	0
22	Pakistan	0	0	0	0
22	Panama	0	0	0	0
22	Peru	0	0	0	0
22	Poland	0	0	0	0
22	Slovakia	0	0	0	0
22	Slovenia	0	0	0	0
22	South Korea	0	0	0	0
22	Syria	0	0	0	0
22	Thailand	0	0	0	0
22	Tunisia	0	0	0	0
22	Turkey	0	0	0	0
22	United States	0	0	0	0
22	Yemen	0	0	0	0
Totals (58 entries)		27	27	56	110
