= Tatyana Moskvina =

Russian journalist (1958–2022)

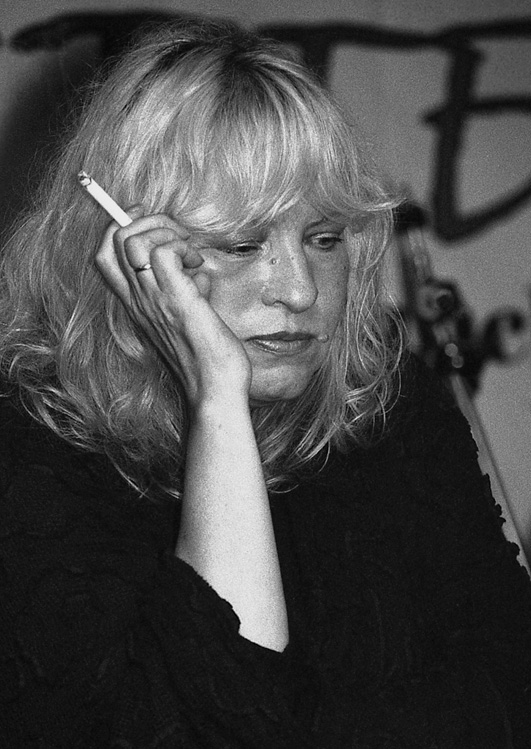
- Born: 2 November 1958; Leningrad, Russian Soviet Federative Socialist Republic, USSR (now Saint Petersburg, Russia)
- Died: 25 July 2022 (aged 63); Saint Petersburg, Russia
- Education: Russian State Institute of Performing Arts
- Occupation: novelist

Tatyana Vladimirovna Moskvina (Russian: Татья́на Влади́мировна Москвина́; 2 November 1958 – 25 July 2022) was a Russian columnist, novelist, actress, radio and television journalist, and host, and leading theatre and film critic.

She was born in 1958 in Leningrad. In 1981, she graduated from the faculty of theatre criticism at Leningrad State Institute of Theatre and Cinematography.

Tatyana Moskvina contributed to many cinema and literary journals, including Russian Encyclopedia of Modern Cinema (1986–2000). In 2000, 2003 she was awarded the title of The Golden Quill in Journalism in Saint-Petersburg. In 2005, her novel Death is All Men was short-listed for the Russian award National Bestseller.
