= Andrei Kazusenok =

Belarusian judoka (born 1984)

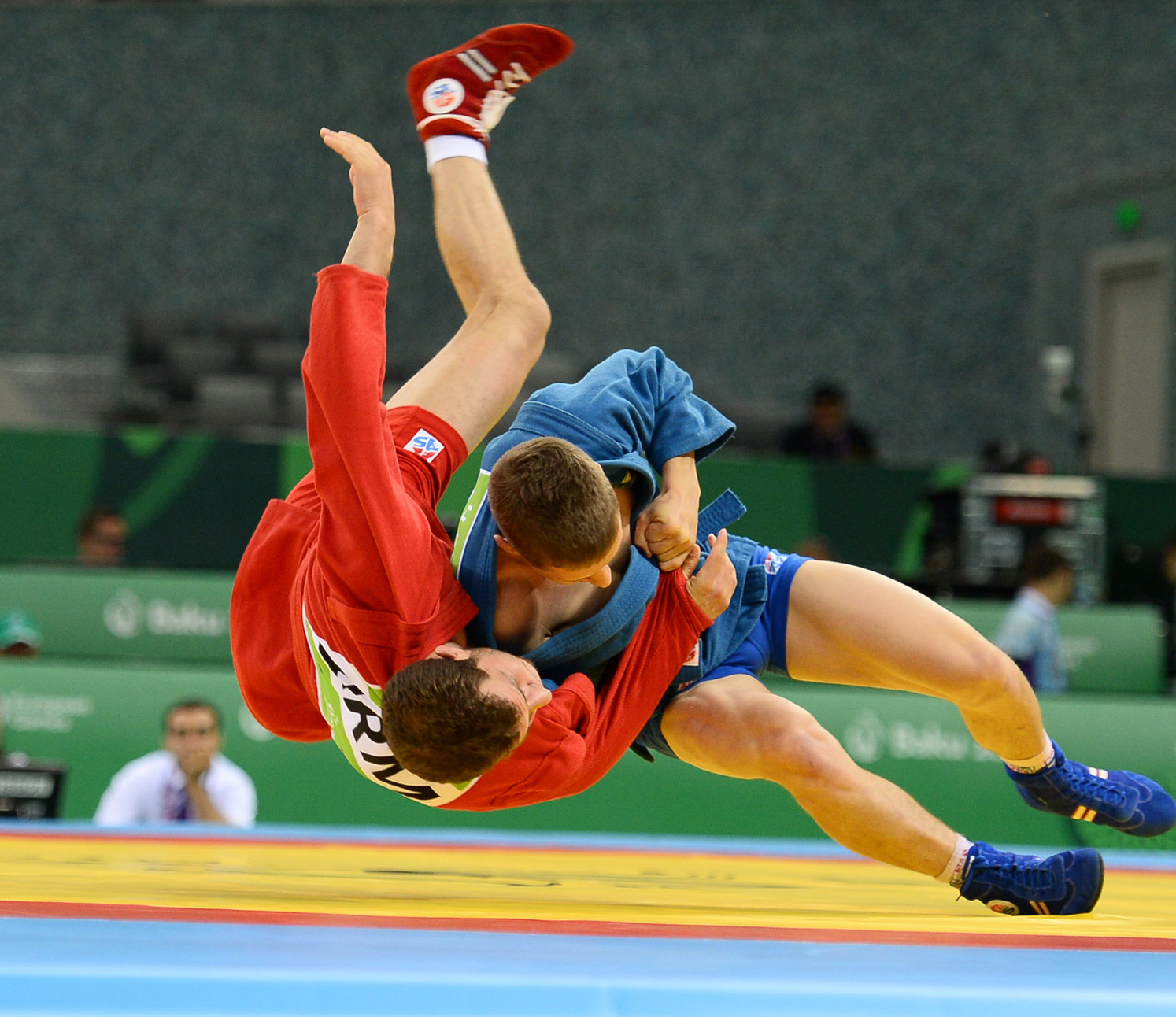
- Kazusenok (right) at the 2015 European Games.

Personal information
- Native name: Andrei Fyodorovich Kazusenok
- Born: 15 January 1984 (age 42) Babruysk, Byelorussian SSR, Soviet Union
- Occupation: Judoka

Sport
- Country: Belarus
- Sport: Judo, Sambo
- Weight class: ‍–‍90 kg

Achievements and titles
- Olympic Games: 7th (2008)
- World Champ.: (bronze) (2005)
- European Champ.: (gold) (2009)
Medal record
Representing Belarus
Men's judo
World Championships
Bronze medal – third place	2005 Cairo	‍–‍90 kg
European Championships
Gold medal – first place	2009 Tbilisi	‍–‍90 kg
Bronze medal – third place	2008 Lisbon	‍–‍90 kg
Bronze medal – third place	2012 Chelyabinsk	‍–‍90 kg
IJF Grand Slam
Silver medal – second place	2009 Moscow	‍–‍90 kg
European U23 Championships
Gold medal – first place	2005 Kyiv	‍–‍90 kg
Bronze medal – third place	2004 Ljubljana	‍–‍90 kg
European Junior Championships
Bronze medal – third place	2002 Rotterdam	‍–‍81 kg
Men's sambo
World Championships
Gold medal – first place	2007 Prague	‍–‍90 kg
Gold medal – first place	2008 St. Petersburg	‍–‍90 kg
Silver medal – second place	2018 Bucharest	‍–‍100 kg
European Games
Silver medal – second place	2015 Baku	‍–‍90 kg
Silver medal – second place	2019 Minsk	‍–‍90 kg

Profile at external databases
- IJF: 864, 52689
- JudoInside.com: 14260
- Updated on 14 November 2022

Andrei Fyodorovich Kazusenok (Belarusian: Андрей Фёдорович Казусенок, born 15 January 1984) is a Belarusian judoka and sambist.

At the 2008 Summer Olympics Kazusenok was eliminated in the quarterfinals of the 90 kg competition after losing his fight to Ivan Pershin. In the repechage he lost to eventual bronze medalist Hesham Mesbah of Egypt. In sambo, Kazusenok won gold at the 2007 and 2008 World Championships.

== Achievements ==
Year	Tournament	Place	Weight class
2012	European Judo Championships	3rd	Middleweight (–90 kg)
2009	European Judo Championships	1st	Middleweight (–90 kg)
2008	2008 Summer Olympics	7th	Middleweight (–90 kg)
2008	European Judo Championships	3rd	Middleweight (–90 kg)
2008	2008 World Sambo Championships	1st	Middleweight (–90 kg)
2007	European Judo Championships	5th	Middleweight (–90 kg)
2007	2007 World Sambo Championships	1st	Middleweight (–90 kg)
2005	World Judo Championships	3rd	Middleweight (–90 kg)
