= 2007 World Sambo Championships =

Sambo competitions

- Location: Prague, Czech Republic
- Dates: 7–11 November

The 2007 World Sambo Championships was held in Prague, Czech Republic from 7 to 11 November 2007. This tournament hosted competition in Combat Sambo, and Sport Sambo events.

== Categories ==
- Combat Sambo: 52 kg, 57 kg, 62 kg, 68 kg, 74 kg, 82 kg, 90 kg, 100 kg, +100 kg
- Men's: 52 kg, 57 kg, 62 kg, 68 kg, 74 kg, 82 kg, 90 kg, 100 kg, +100 kg
- Women's: 48 kg, 52 kg, 56 kg, 60 kg, 64 kg, 72 kg, 80 kg, +80 kg

== Medal overview ==
=== Combat Sambo events ===
Event	Gold	Silver	Bronze
Flyweight (52 kg)	Bair Vanzhilov (RUS)	Soninkhuu Orkhonbaatar (MGL)	Almas Sulemenov (KAZ)
Flyweight (52 kg)	Bair Vanzhilov (RUS)	Soninkhuu Orkhonbaatar (MGL)	Hashim Yasim (JOR)
Super-flyweight (57 kg)	Denis Emelyukov (RUS)	Sergei Gluschenko (UKR)	Yerzhal Zussupov (KAZ)
Super-flyweight (57 kg)	Denis Emelyukov (RUS)	Sergei Gluschenko (UKR)	Marko Kosev (BUL)
Half-lightweight (62 kg)	Baasankhun Damlanpurev (MGL)	Maxim Kustov (RUS)	Igor Severin (UKR)
Half-lightweight (62 kg)	Baasankhun Damlanpurev (MGL)	Maxim Kustov (RUS)	Konstantin Tabakov (BUL)
Lightweight (68 kg)	Sergej Grecicho (LTU)	Murat Ristov (RUS)	Maxat Ibragimov (KAZ)
Lightweight (68 kg)	Sergej Grecicho (LTU)	Murat Ristov (RUS)	Vladimir Shevkov (LAT)
Low-middleweight (74 kg)	Igor Isaykin (RUS)	Oleg Martinenko (UKR)	Nima Lotfi (IRN)
Low-middleweight (74 kg)	Igor Isaykin (RUS)	Oleg Martinenko (UKR)	Zezva Ebelashvili (USA)
Half-middleweight (82 kg)	Rosen Dimitrov (BUL)	David Grigoryan (UKR)	Shamil Alabatyrov (RUS)
Half-middleweight (82 kg)	Rosen Dimitrov (BUL)	David Grigoryan (UKR)	Darius Stankevichius (LTU)
Middleweight (90 kg)	Aleksander Kolomiyets (UKR)	Vladislav Chernavskis (LAT)	Alexey Veselovzorov (RUS)
Middleweight (90 kg)	Aleksander Kolomiyets (UKR)	Vladislav Chernavskis (LAT)	Rumen Dimitrov (BUL)
Half-heavyweight (100 kg)	Aleksander Garkushenko (RUS)	Arturas Pranckevichyus (LTU)	Konstantin Stupachenko (UKR)
Half-heavyweight (100 kg)	Aleksander Garkushenko (RUS)	Arturas Pranckevichyus (LTU)	Kamen Georgiev (BUL)
Heavyweight (+100 kg)	Fedor Emelianenko (RUS)	Vladimir Begezev (UKR)	Kamil Chrobak (CZE)
Heavyweight (+100 kg)	Fedor Emelianenko (RUS)	Vladimir Begezev (UKR)	Yancho Dimitrov (BUL)

=== Men's Sambo events ===
Event	Gold	Silver	Bronze
Flyweight (52 kg)	Ushangi Kuzanashvili (GEO)	Beslan Mudranov (RUS)	Erbolat Baybatirov (KAZ)
Flyweight (52 kg)	Ushangi Kuzanashvili (GEO)	Beslan Mudranov (RUS)	Islam Qasimov (AZE)
Super-flyweight (57 kg)	Timor Gallymo (RUS)	Aleksander Morudov (BLR)	Shuhrat Muradov (UZB)
Super-flyweight (57 kg)	Timor Gallymo (RUS)	Aleksander Morudov (BLR)	Elchin Mayilov (AZE)
Half-lightweight (62 kg)	Timor Gallymo (RUS)	Aleksander Morudov (BLR)	Shuhrat Muradov (UZB)
Half-lightweight (62 kg)	Timor Gallymo (RUS)	Aleksander Morudov (BLR)	Elchin Mayilov (AZE)
Lightweight (68 kg)	Dmitriy Bazilev (BLR)	Sanjaasürengiin Miyaaragchaa (MGL)	Takuya Ogawa (JPN)
Lightweight (68 kg)	Dmitriy Bazilev (BLR)	Sanjaasürengiin Miyaaragchaa (MGL)	Asilbek Alkey (KAZ)
Low-middleweight (74 kg)	Victor Savinov (UKR)	Aleksander Sharov (RUS)	David Ducanovic (FRA)
Low-middleweight (74 kg)	Victor Savinov (UKR)	Aleksander Sharov (RUS)	Kaha Mamulashvili (GEO)
Half-middleweight (82 kg)	Magomem Abdulganilov (BLR)	Vladimir Prikazchikov (RUS)	Levan Tsiklauri (GEO)
Half-middleweight (82 kg)	Magomem Abdulganilov (BLR)	Vladimir Prikazchikov (RUS)	Zaur Pasayev (AZE)
Middleweight (90 kg)	Andrei Kazusionak (BLR)	Alsim Chernoskulov (RUS)	Akobir Kurbonov (UZB)
Middleweight (90 kg)	Andrei Kazusionak (BLR)	Alsim Chernoskulov (RUS)	Moysey Iliadis (GRE)
Half-heavyweight (100 kg)	Mirian Pavliashvili (GEO)	Kiril Volovik (UKR)	Sergei Kukharenk (BLR)
Half-heavyweight (100 kg)	Mirian Pavliashvili (GEO)	Kiril Volovik (UKR)	Evgeniy Isaev (RUS)
Heavyweight (+100 kg)	Yury Rybak (BLR)	Mikhail Starkov (RUS)	Eduard Grams (GER)
Heavyweight (+100 kg)	Yury Rybak (BLR)	Mikhail Starkov (RUS)	Majid Vincent (IDN)

=== Women's Sambo events ===
Event	Gold	Silver	Bronze
Extra-lightweight (48 kg)	Kristina Kvachan (RUS)	Tamara Karapetyan (UKR)	Nomin Erdenechime (MGL)
Extra-lightweight (48 kg)	Kristina Kvachan (RUS)	Tamara Karapetyan (UKR)	Tatiana Moskvina (BLR)
Half-lightweight (52 kg)	Mönkhbaataryn Bundmaa (MGL)	Marina Garskaya (BLR)	Uliana Remitskaya (UKR)
Half-lightweight (52 kg)	Mönkhbaataryn Bundmaa (MGL)	Marina Garskaya (BLR)	Tatiana Zenchenko (RUS)
Lightweight (56 kg)	Marina Korneeva (RUS)	Erdenet-Od Khishigbat (MGL)	Olga Lazoriv (UKR)
Lightweight (56 kg)	Marina Korneeva (RUS)	Erdenet-Od Khishigbat (MGL)	Elitsa Rageva (BUL)
Super-lightweight (60 kg)	Raysa Baylieva (KAZ)	Yohana Castano (COL)	Linda Circene (LAT)
Super-lightweight (60 kg)	Raysa Baylieva (KAZ)	Yohana Castano (COL)	Ana Repida (MDA)
Half-middleweight (64 kg)	Alena Sayko (UKR)	Leva Klimashaus Kiene (LTU)	Ekaterina Goldberg (RUS)
Half-middleweight (64 kg)	Alena Sayko (UKR)	Leva Klimashaus Kiene (LTU)	Adriana Cherar (ROM)
Middleweight (68 kg)	Olga Usoltseva (RUS)	Maria Semenyuk (UKR)	Evija Pukite (LAT)
Middleweight (68 kg)	Olga Usoltseva (RUS)	Maria Semenyuk (UKR)	Madeleine Choconta (COL)
Super-middleweight (72 kg)	Marina Prischepa (UKR)	Nevenka Chupovich (SRB)	Ekaterina Radevich (BLR)
Super-middleweight (72 kg)	Marina Prischepa (UKR)	Nevenka Chupovich (SRB)	Dacil Lopez (ESP)
Half-heavyweight (80 kg)	Natalia Smal (UKR)	Maria Oryashkova (BUL)	Elizabeth Amaya (VEN)
Half-heavyweight (80 kg)	Natalia Smal (UKR)	Maria Oryashkova (BUL)	Oksana Oblamskaya (BLR)
Heavyweight (+80 kg)	Ylia Borisik (BLR)	Tserenkhand Dorjgotov (MGL)	Angelika Sopp (EST)
Heavyweight (+80 kg)	Ylia Borisik (BLR)	Tserenkhand Dorjgotov (MGL)	Irina Rodina (RUS)

=== Medal table ===
Rank	Nation	Gold	Silver	Bronze	Total
1	Russia	10	6	6	22
2	Ukraine	5	7	4	16
3	Belarus	5	3	4	12
4	Mongolia	2	4	1	7
5	Georgia	2	0	2	4
6	Lithuania	1	2	1	4
7	Bulgaria	1	1	6	8
8	Kazakhstan	1	0	4	5
9	Latvia	0	1	3	4
10	Colombia	0	1	1	2
11	Serbia	0	1	0	1
12	Azerbaijan	0	0	4	4
13	Uzbekistan	0	0	3	3
14	Czech Republic	0	0	1	1
14	France	0	0	1	1
14	Germany	0	0	1	1
14	Greece	0	0	1	1
14	Indonesia	0	0	1	1
14	Iran	0	0	1	1
14	Japan	0	0	1	1
14	Jordan	0	0	1	1
14	Moldova	0	0	1	1
14	Romania	0	0	1	1
14	Spain	0	0	1	1
14	United States	0	0	1	1
14	Venezuela	0	0	1	1
27	Algeria	0	0	0	0
27	Austria	0	0	0	0
27	Belgium	0	0	0	0
27	Cameroon	0	0	0	0
27	Canada	0	0	0	0
27	Cyprus	0	0	0	0
27	Ecuador	0	0	0	0
27	Finland	0	0	0	0
27	Great Britain	0	0	0	0
27	India	0	0	0	0
27	Ireland	0	0	0	0
27	Israel	0	0	0	0
27	Italy	0	0	0	0
27	Kyrgyzstan	0	0	0	0
27	Lebanon	0	0	0	0
27	Malaysia	0	0	0	0
27	Morocco	0	0	0	0
27	Nepal	0	0	0	0
27	New Zealand	0	0	0	0
27	Pakistan	0	0	0	0
27	Panama	0	0	0	0
27	Peru	0	0	0	0
27	Poland	0	0	0	0
27	Slovakia	0	0	0	0
27	Slovenia	0	0	0	0
27	South Korea	0	0	0	0
27	Syria	0	0	0	0
27	Tajikistan	0	0	0	0
27	Thailand	0	0	0	0
27	Tunisia	0	0	0	0
27	Turkey	0	0	0	0
27	Yemen	0	0	0	0
Totals (58 entries)		27	26	52	105
