= Ivan Iliev (judoka) =

Bulgarian judoka (born 1985)

Personal information
- Born: 18 March 1985 (age 41)
- Occupation: Judoka

Sport
- Country: Bulgaria
- Sport: Judo
- Weight class: +100 kg

Achievements and titles
- World Champ.: R16 (2005, 2009)
- European Champ.: 5th (2003)
Medal record
Men's judo
Representing Bulgaria
European U23 Championships
Silver medal – second place	2004 Ljubljana	+100 kg
Silver medal – second place	2007 Salzburg	+100 kg
World Juniors Championships
Bronze medal – third place	2004 Budapest	+100 kg
European Junior Championships
Bronze medal – third place	2004 Sofia	+100 kg

Profile at external databases
- IJF: 506
- JudoInside.com: 13851
- Updated on 11 January 2023

Ivan Iliev (Bulgarian: Иван Илиев; born 18 March 1985) is a Bulgarian judoka.

== Achievements ==
Year	Tournament	Place	Weight class
2005	European Judo Championships	7th	Heavyweight (+100 kg)
2003	European Judo Championships	5th	Heavyweight (+100 kg)
2012	World Sambo Championships	3rd	Heavyweight (+100 kg)
