= World Sambo Championships =

Sambo competitions

- Current event or competition: 2025 World Sambo Championships

Competition details
- Discipline: Sambo
- Type: Annual
- Organiser: Fédération Internationale de Sambo (FIAS)

History
- Editions: 46 (2021)

The World Sambo Championships are the main championships in Sambo and Combat Sambo, organized by the Fédération Internationale de Sambo (FIAS).

== History ==
The first World Sambo Cup took place in 1977 in Oviedo, Spain. Two years later, the first Youth World Championships were held in Madrid, Spain.

In 1984, an assembly of the Fédération Internationale des Luttes Associées (FILA), now known as the United World Wrestling, chose to create an independent federation for sambo, the Fédération Internationale de Sambo (FIAS). On 13 June 1984, a constitutive General Assembly of the FIAS was held in Madrid, in which delegates from 56 countries took part. Fernando Compte was elected the first president of FIAS.

The first championships for women was held in 1984 in Madrid, Spain.

== Timeline ==
- The International Association of the public union the “European Sambo Federation” was established in 1991 and officially registered in 2005. The European sambo federation (ESF) is a member of International Sambo Federation (FIAS).
- In 2007 SAMBO was presented at the First European Games in Ukraine.
- In 2010 SAMBO was included in the SportAccord World Combat Games which were held in Beijing (China).
- In 2012 at the report-electing congress of the European sambo federation Dr. Sergey Eliseev, the president of the All-Russian Sambo Federation, was re-elected for the position of the ESF president for the next period.
- In 2012 the European SAMBO championship among cadets (15–16 years, boys and girls) was organised for the first time in Tallinn.
- In 2013 SAMBO was included in the official program of the 27th Summer Universiade, the World Students Games in Kazan (Russia) and also into the Asian Games.
- In 2014 SAMBO was included into the program of the European Games.
- In 2015 First European Games were held in Baku, Azerbaijan. The same year European SAMBO Cup was included in the ESF Calendar.
- In 2016 First World University SAMBO Championships under the banner of FISU was held in Nicosia, Cyprus.
- 2017 - World SAMBO Championships were held in Sochi, Russia. A record number of 490 athletes from 90 countries were competing for the titles of World Champions.
- In 2018 Orel (Russia) hosted for the first time the World Schools SAMBO Championships under the auspices of the International School Sports Federation (ISF). Athletes from 21 countries took part in the competition.
- 2019 - II European Games were held in Minsk.
- Azerbaijan, Belarus, Bulgaria, Cyprus, Greece, Georgia, Italy, Moldova, Latvia, Lithuania, Russia, Spain, Montenegro and Serbia hosted many sambo championships during these years.

== Events ==
1996 to 2020 weight classes:

Men	52 kg	57 kg	62 kg	68 kg	74 kg	82 kg	90 kg	100 kg	+100 kg	Women	48 kg	52 kg	56 kg	60 kg	64 kg	68 kg	72 kg	80 kg	+80 kg

Since 2021 reduce to 7 weight.

== Senior Championships ==
Women's World Championships was held for the first time in 1984. In 1993 FIAS splits into 2 organisations FIAS East (Russian control) and FIAS West (USA and Western European control) until 2005. In 2005 FILA reaches an agreement with FIAS West and re-assumes sanctioning over SAMBO but in 2008 FILA again discontinues sanctioning sambo. In 2014 FIAS and FILA sign a cooperative agreement:

Edition	Year	Host City	Host Country	Events	Nations
Organized by Fédération Internationale des Luttes Associées (FILA)
1	1973	Tehran	Iran	10	11
2	1974	Ulan Bator	Mongolia	10	5
3	1975	Minsk	Soviet Union	10	8
4	1979	Madrid	Spain	10	11
never take place	1980	Madrid	Spain	-	-
5	1981	Madrid	Spain	10	12
6	1982	Paris	France	10	11
7	1983	Kyiv	Soviet Union	10	8
8	1984	Madrid	Spain	10+W	10
Organized by Fédération Internationale de Amateur Sambo (FIAS)
9	1985	San Sebastián	Spain	10+W	11
10	1986	Saint-Jean-de-Luz	France	10+W	8
11	1987	Milan	Italy	10+W	9
12	1988	Montreal	Canada	10+W	11
13	1989	West Orange	United States	10+W	9
14	1990	Moscow	Soviet Union	10+W	18
Organized by FIAS and FMS
15	1991	Montreal / Chambéry	Canada / France	10+10+W	8
16	1992	Herne Bay / Minsk	England / Belarus	10+10+W	14
17	1993	Kstovo / Omsk	Russia / Russia	10+W	28
Organized by FIAS East and FIAS West
18	1994	Novi Sad / Montreal	Serbia / Canada	10+10+W	20
19	1995	Sofia /	Bulgaria /	9+10+W	23
20	1996	Tokyo /	Japan /	18+West	23
21	1997	Tbilisi /	Georgia /	18+West	20
22	1998	Kaliningrad /	Russia /	18+West	20
23	1999	Gijón /	Spain /	18+West	20
24	2000	Kyiv /	Ukraine /	18+West	21
25	2001	Krasnoyarsk /	Russia /	18+West	26
26	2002	Panama City /	Panama /	18+West	19
27	2003	Alpes-Maritimes (C); Saint Petersburg (S)	France (C); Russia (S) (West)	27+West	32
28	2004	Prague (C); Chișinău (S)	Czech Republic (C); Moldova (S) (West)	27+West	23
29	2005	Prague (C); Astana (S)	Czech Republic (C); Kazakhstan (S) (West)	27+West	27
Organized by Fédération Internationale de Amateur Sambo (FIAS)
30	2006	Tashkent (C); Sofia (S)	Uzbekistan (C); Bulgaria (S)	27	33

Edition	Year	Host City	Host Country	Events	Nations
31	2007	Prague	Czech Republic	27	43
32	2008	Saint Petersburg	Russia	27	48
33	2009	Thessaloniki	Greece	27	46
34	2010	Tashkent	Uzbekistan	27	26
35	2011	Vilnius	Lithuania	27	65
36	2012	Minsk	Belarus	27	64
37	2013	Saint Petersburg	Russia	27	70
38	2014	Narita	Japan	27	82
39	2015	Casablanca	Morocco	27	80
40	2016	Sofia	Bulgaria	27	77
41	2017	Sochi	Russia	27	90
42	2018	Bucharest	Romania	27	80
43	2019	Cheongju	South Korea	27	50
44	2020	Novi Sad	Serbia	27	30
45	2021	Tashkent	Uzbekistan	21	49
46	2022	Bishkek	Kyrgyzstan	21	50
47	2023	Yerevan	Armenia	21	62
48	2024	Astana	Kazakhstan	31	80
49	2025	Bishkek	Kyrgyzstan	31	70
50	2026	Samarkand	Uzbekistan	33	

|} Note: C = Combat Sambo / S = Sport Sambo / W = Women Events

== Other championships ==
- Juniors: Since 1979:
- Youth: Since 1996:
- Cadet: Unknown.
- Masters: Unknown.
- Students / University: Since 2003:
  - 2016 – 1st WORLD UNIVERSITY SAMBO CHAMPIONSHIPS (M&W, TEAMS)
- Schools: Since 2018:
  - Inaugural World Schools Championships in 2018.
- Deaf: Since 2017.
  - First international deaf Sambo tournament held in 2017 but is not world championship.
- Beach: Since 2021.
- Military: Since 2018.

== See also ==
- Sambo World Cup
- European Sambo Championships
- Sambo at the 2015 European Games
- Sambo at the 2019 European Games
- Sambo at the 2018 Asian Games
- Sambo at the Summer Universiade
- Sambo at the World Games
