= 2015 World Sambo Championships =

Sambo competitions

- Location: Casablanca, Morocco

Champions
- Half-flyweight (52 kg): Almas Suleimenov (KAZ); Flyweight (57 kg): Marko Kosev (BUL); Half-lightweight (62 kg): Veselin Ivanov (BUL); Lightweight (68 kg): Arman Ospanov (KAZ); Welterweight (74 kg): Istam Kudratov (UZB); Half-middleweight (82 kg): Alexey Ivanov (RUS); Middleweight (90 kg): Vyacheslav Vasilevsky (RUS); Half-heavyweight (100 kg): Vadim Nemkov (RUS); Heavyweight (+100 kg): Kirill Sidelnikov (RUS)

The 2015 World Sambo Championships was held in Casablanca, Morocco between the 12 and 16 November 2015. This tournament included competition in both Sambo, and Combat Sambo.

== Medal overview ==
=== Combat Sambo Events ===
Event	Gold	Silver	Bronze
Half-flyweight (52 kg)	Almas Suleimenov (KAZ)	Amyr Bakrasov (RUS)	Rakhmatjon Akhmedov (UZB)
Half-flyweight (52 kg)	Almas Suleimenov (KAZ)	Amyr Bakrasov (RUS)	Sergei Chornyi (UKR)
Flyweight (57 kg)	Marko Kosev (BUL)	Bohdan Babenko (UKR)	Ernest Hayrapetyan (ARM)
Flyweight (57 kg)	Marko Kosev (BUL)	Bohdan Babenko (UKR)	Ahmet Tanriberdiyev (TKM)
Half-lightweight (62 kg)	Veselin Ivanov (BUL)	Joash Walkins (TRI)	Serhii Bobyr (UKR)
Half-lightweight (62 kg)	Veselin Ivanov (BUL)	Joash Walkins (TRI)	Orozbek Abtandil Uulu (KGZ)
Lightweight (68 kg)	Arman Ospanov (KAZ)	Rashad Muradov (RUS)	Sergej Grecicho (LIT)
Lightweight (68 kg)	Arman Ospanov (KAZ)	Rashad Muradov (RUS)	Abdylla Babayev (TKM)
Welterweight (74 kg)	Istam Kudratov (UZB)	Temirlan Ikhsangaliev (KAZ)	
Welterweight (74 kg)	Istam Kudratov (UZB)	Temirlan Ikhsangaliev (KAZ)	Vadym Burchak (UKR)
Half-middleweight (82 kg)	Alexey Ivanov (RUS)	Samat Zhanybek Uulu (KGZ)	Sanjar Nematov (UZB)
Half-middleweight (82 kg)	Alexey Ivanov (RUS)	Samat Zhanybek Uulu (KGZ)	Maksym Ryndovskyi (UKR)
Middleweight (90 kg)	Vyacheslav Vasilevsky (RUS)	Mariyan Dimitrov (BUL)	Janybek Amatov (KGZ)
Middleweight (90 kg)	Vyacheslav Vasilevsky (RUS)	Mariyan Dimitrov (BUL)	Sebastien Libebe (FRA)
Half-heavyweight (100 kg)	Vadim Nemkov (RUS)	Anatolii Voloshynov (BUL)	Atanas Dzhambazov (BUL)
Half-heavyweight (100 kg)	Vadim Nemkov (RUS)	Anatolii Voloshynov (BUL)	Islomjon Azimov (AZE)
Heavyweight (+100 kg)	Kirill Sidelnikov (RUS)	Sang Soo Lee (KOR)	Dymytrii Poberezhets (UKR)
Heavyweight (+100 kg)	Kirill Sidelnikov (RUS)	Sang Soo Lee (KOR)	Martin Marinkov (BUL)
