= Judo at the 1992 Summer Olympics – Men's 65 kg =

Judo competition

Men's 65 kg at the Games of the XXV Olympiad
- Venue: Palau Blaugrana
- Date: 1 August 1992
- Competitors: 46 from 46 nations

Medalists
1st place, gold medalist(s)		Rogério Sampaio	Brazil
2nd place, silver medalist(s)		József Csák	Hungary
3rd place, bronze medalist(s)		Israel Hernández	Cuba
3rd place, bronze medalist(s)		Udo Quellmalz	Germany

The men's 65 kg competition in judo at the 1992 Summer Olympics in Barcelona was held on 1 August at the Palau Blaugrana. The gold medal was won by Rogério Sampaio of Brazil.

== Results ==
=== Main brackets ===
==== Pool A ====
Round of 64
Marko Korhonen (FIN)	E
Ciarán Ward (IRL)	YUS
Israel Hernández (CUB)	WIP
Dănuţ Pop (ROU)	RA
Walther Kaiser (LIE)	E
Jimmy Pedro (USA)	IPO
Eric Born (SUI)	E
Benôit Campargue (FRA)	WAZ
Mamadou Coulibaly (MLI)	E
Pavel Petřikov (TCH)	HAN
József Csák (HUN)	IPO
Dikubenga Mavatiku (COD)	RA
Caleb Jean (HAI)	IPO
Joseph Momanyi (KEN)	E

Round of 32
Ciarán Ward (IRL)	E
Štefan Cuk (SLO)	YUS
Israel Hernández (CUB)	YUK
Abdel Hakim Harkat (ALG)	RA
Jimmy Pedro (USA)	IPO
Au Woon Yiu (HKG)	E
Benôit Campargue (FRA)	E
Kenji Maruyama (JPN)	IPO
Pavel Petřikov (TCH)	YUS
Sergey Kosmynin (EUN)	E
József Csák (HUN)	YUK
Ivan Netov (BUL)	RA
Caleb Jean (HAI)	E
Dambiinyamyn Maralgerel (MGL)	IPO
Stig Traavik (NOR)	E
Philip Laats (BEL)	YUK

Round of 16
Štefan Cuk (SLO)	RA
Israel Hernández (CUB)	IPO
Jimmy Pedro (USA)	E
Kenji Maruyama (JPN)	YUK
Pavel Petřikov (TCH)	RA
József Csák (HUN)	YUK
Dambiinyamyn Maralgerel (MGL)	E
Philip Laats (BEL)	YUS

Quarterfinal
Israel Hernández (CUB)	KOK
Kenji Maruyama (JPN)	RA
József Csák (HUN)	WIP
Philip Laats (BEL)	RA

Semifinal
Israel Hernández (CUB)	RB
József Csák (HUN)	IPO

==== Pool B ====
Round of 64
Jörgen Häggqvist (SWE)	E
Francisco Morales (ARG)	IPO
Sakor Rodet (CHA)	E
Jorge Steffano (URU)	WIP
Kim Sang-mun (KOR)	YUK
Li Gwang (PRK)	E
Augusto Almeida (POR)	IPO
Vicente Céspedes (PAR)	E
Udo Quellmalz (GER)	IPO
Francisco Lorenzo (ESP)	RB
Said Masoud El-Agimi (LBA)	E
Gao Erwei (CHN)	IPO
Jean Pierre Cantin (CAN)	IPO
Ekers Raposo (DOM)	E

Round of 32
Francisco Morales (ARG)	YUK
Ian Freeman (GBR)	E
Jorge Steffano (URU)	YUS
Pierre Sène (SEN)	E
Kim Sang-mun (KOR)	IPO
Vsevolods Zelonijs (LAT)	E
Augusto Almeida (POR)	RB
Rogério Sampaio (BRA)	IPO
Udo Quellmalz (GER)	IPO
Assaf El-Murr (LIB)	RB
Gao Erwei (CHN)	IPO
Hussain Mohamed Hassan (KUW)	E
Jean Pierre Cantin (CAN)	IPO
Ilias Ioannou (CYP)	E
Mansour Al-Soraihi (YEM)	E
Sandeep Byala (IND)	IPO

Round of 16
Francisco Morales (ARG)	IPO
Jorge Steffano (URU)	E
Kim Sang-mun (KOR)	RB
Rogério Sampaio (BRA)	IPO
Udo Quellmalz (GER)	YUK
Gao Erwei (CHN)	RB
Jean Pierre Cantin (CAN)	YUS
Sandeep Byala (IND)	E

Quarterfinal
Francisco Morales (ARG)	RB
Rogério Sampaio (BRA)	IPO
Udo Quellmalz (GER)	YUK
Jean Pierre Cantin (CAN)	RB

Semifinal
Rogério Sampaio (BRA)	CHU
Udo Quellmalz (GER)	RA

=== Repechages ===
==== Repechage A ====
Repechage round 1
Dănuţ Pop (ROU)	WAZ
Abdel Hakim Harkat (ALG)	E
Dikubenga Mavatiku (ROU)	E
Ivan Netov (BUL)	IPO

Repechage round 2
Dănuţ Pop (ROU)	WAZ
Štefan Cuk (SLO)	E
Ivan Netov (BUL)	E
Pavel Petřikov (TCH)	YUS

Repechage quarterfinal
Dănuţ Pop (ROU)	E
Kenji Maruyama (JPN)	IPO
Pavel Petřikov (TCH)	E
Philip Laats (BEL)	IPO

Repechage semifinal
Kenji Maruyama (JPN)	E
Philip Laats (BEL)	WIP

Repechage final
Philip Laats (BEL)	E
Udo Quellmalz (GER)	YUS (bronze)

==== Repechage B ====
Repechage round 1
Francisco Lorenzo (ESP)	YUK
Assaf El-Murr (LIB)	E

Repechage round 2
Augusto Almeida (POR)	E
Kim Sang-mun (KOR)	IPO
Francisco Lorenzo (ESP)	YUK
Gao Erwei (CHN)	E

Repechage quarterfinal
Kim Sang-mun (KOR)	IPO
Francisco Morales (ARG)	E
Francisco Lorenzo (ESP)	IPO
Jean Pierre Cantin (CAN)	E

Repechage semifinal
Kim Sang-mun (KOR)	E
Francisco Lorenzo (ESP)	IPO

Repechage final
Francisco Lorenzo (ESP)	E
Israel Hernández (CUB)	IPO (bronze)

=== Final ===
Final
József Csák (HUN)	2nd place, silver medalist(s)
Rogério Sampaio (BRA)	WAZ (gold)

== Final classification ==
Rank	Judoka	Nation
1st place, gold medalist(s)	Rogério Sampaio	Brazil
2nd place, silver medalist(s)	József Csák	Hungary
3rd place, bronze medalist(s)	Israel Hernández	Cuba
3rd place, bronze medalist(s)	Udo Quellmalz	Germany
5T	Philip Laats	Belgium
5T	Francisco Lorenzo	Spain
7T	Kim Sang-mun	South Korea
7T	Kenji Maruyama	Japan
9T	Dănuţ Pop	Romania
9T	Pavel Petřikov	Czechoslovakia
9T	Francisco Morales	Argentina
9T	Jean Pierre Cantin	Canada
13T	Štefan Cuk	Slovenia
13T	Ivan Netov	Bulgaria
13T	Augusto Almeida	Portugal
13T	Gao Erwei	China
17T	Abdel Hakim Harkat	Algeria
17T	Dikubenga Mavatiku	Zaire
17T	Assaf El-Murr	Lebanon
20T	Jimmy Pedro	United States
20T	Dambiinyamyn Maralgerel	Mongolia
20T	Jorge Steffano	Uruguay
20T	Sandeep Byala	India
24T	Ciarán Ward	Ireland
24T	Caleb Jean	Haiti
24T	Au Woon Yiu	Hong Kong
24T	Benôit Campargue	France
24T	Sergey Kosmynin	Unified Team
24T	Stig Traavik	Norway
24T	Ian Freeman	Great Britain
24T	Pierre Sène	Senegal
24T	Vsevolods Zelonijs	Latvia
24T	Ilias Ioannou	Cyprus
24T	Mansour Al-Soraihi	Yemen
24T	Hussain Mohamed Hassan	Kuwait
36T	Marko Korhonen	Finland
36T	Walther Kaiser	Liechtenstein
36T	Eric Born	Switzerland
36T	Mamadou Coulibaly	Mali
36T	Joseph Momanyi	Kenya
36T	Jörgen Häggqvist	Sweden
36T	Sakor Rodet	Chad
36T	Li Gwang	North Korea
36T	Vicente Céspedes	Paraguay
36T	Said Masoud El-Agimi	Libya
36T	Ekers Raposo	Dominican Republic
