= Judo at the 1996 Summer Olympics – Men's 65 kg =

Judo competition

Men's 65 kg at the Games of the XXVI Olympiad
- Venue: Georgia World Congress Center
- Date: 25 July 1996
- Competitors: 36 from 36 nations

Medalists
1st place, gold medalist(s)		Udo Quellmalz	Germany
2nd place, silver medalist(s)		Yukimasa Nakamura	Japan
3rd place, bronze medalist(s)		Israel Hernández	Cuba
3rd place, bronze medalist(s)		Henrique Guimarães	Brazil

These are the results of the men's 65 kg (also known as half-lightweight) competition in judo at the 1996 Summer Olympics in Atlanta, Georgia. A total of 35 men competed in this event, limited to jūdōka whose body weight was less than, or equal to, 65 kilograms. Competition took place in the Georgia World Congress Center.

== Tournament results ==
=== First round ===
As there were more than 32 qualifiers for the tournament, three first round matches were held to reduce the field to 32 judoka.

- Georgi Revazishvilli (GEO) defeated Francisco Morales (ARG)
- Michel Almeida (POR) defeated José Pérez (PUR)
- Pasi Laurén (FIN) defeated Carlos Ramírez (ESA)

=== Main bracket ===
The gold and silver medalists were determined by the final match of the main single-elimination bracket.

1st Round
Davies (GBR)	W
Seck (SEN)	L
Toro (ESP)	L
Lewak (POL)	W
Akhirov (KAZ)	L
Fuentes (USA)	W
Revazishvilli (GEO)	L
Laats (BEL)	W
Zhang (CHN)	L
Tan (CAN)	W
Almeida (POR)	W
Giorgi (ITA)	L
Hernández (CUB)	W
Fagan (AUS)	L
Quellmalz (GER)	W
Figuereo (DOM)	L
Nyamlkhagva (MGL)	W
Lauren (FIN)	L
Nakamura (JPN)	W
Matsiev (RUS)	L
Mukhamedkhanov (UZB)	W
Molne (AND)	L
Netov (BUL)	W
Ward (IRL)	L
Csák (HUN)	W
Aga (IND)	L
Steffano (URU)	L
MacKinnon (RSA)	W
Guimarães (BRA)	W
Benbadaoud (FRA)	L
Demiriel (TUR)	L
Lee (KOR)	W

2nd Round
Davies (GBR)	L
Lewak (POL)	W
Fuentes (USA)	L
Laats (BEL)	W
Tan (CAN)	L
Almeida (POR)	W
Hernández (CUB)	L
Quellmalz (GER)	W
Nyamlhagva (MGL)	L
Nakamura (JPN)	W
Mukhamedkhanov (UZB)	L
Netov (BUL)	W
Csák (HUN)	W
MacKinnon (RSA)	L
Guimarães (BRA)	W
Lee (KOR)	L

Quarterfinals
Lewak (POL)	L
Laats (BEL)	W
Almeida (POR)	L
Quellmalz (GER)	W
Nakamura (JPN)	W
Netov (BUL)	L
Csák (HUN)	W
Guimarães (BRA)	L

Semifinals
Laats (BEL)	L
Quellmalz (GER)	W
Nakamura (JPN)	W
Csák (HUN)	L

Gold medal final
Quellmalz (GER)	W
Nakamura (JPN)	L

=== Repechage ===
The losing semifinalists as well as those judoka eliminated in earlier rounds by the four semifinalists of the main bracket advanced to the repechage. These matches determined the two bronze medalists for the event.

First round
Revazishvilli (GEO)	W
Fuentes (USA)	L
Figuereo (DOM)	L
Hernández (CUB)	W
Matsiev (RUS)	L
Nyamlhagva (MGL)	W
Aga (IND)	L
MacKinnon (RSA)	W

Second round
Revazishvilli (GEO)	W
Lewak (POL)	L
Hernández (CUB)	W
Almeida (POR)	L
Nyamlhagva (MGL)	L
Netov (BUL)	W
MacKinnon (RSA)	L
Guimarães (BRA)	W

Third round
Revazishvilli (GEO)	L
Hernández (CUB)	W
Netov (BUL)	L
Guimarães (BRA)	W

Bronze medal finals
Hernández (CUB)	W
Csák (HUN)	L
Guimarães (BRA)	W
Laats (BEL)	L
