= Uruguay at the 1992 Summer Olympics =

- IOC code: URU
- NOC: Uruguayan Olympic Committee
- Website: www.cou.org.uy (in Spanish)

in Barcelona
- Competitors: 16 (16 men and 0 women) in 11 sports
- Medals: Gold 0 Silver 0 Bronze 0 Total 0

Summer Olympics appearances (overview)
- 1924; 1928; 1932; 1936; 1948; 1952; 1956; 1960; 1964; 1968; 1972; 1976; 1980; 1984; 1988; 1992; 1996; 2000; 2004; 2008; 2012; 2016; 2020; 2024; 2028

Uruguay competed at the 1992 Summer Olympics in Barcelona, Spain. Sixteen competitors, all men, took part in fifteen events in eleven sports.

== Competitors ==
The following is the list of number of competitors in the Games.

Sport	Men	Women	Total
Athletics	2	0	2
Boxing	2	–	2
Canoeing	1	0	1
Cycling	2	0	2
Judo	1	0	1
Modern pentathlon	1	–	1
Rowing	1	0	1
Sailing	3	0	3
Shooting	1	0	1
Swimming	1	0	1
Weightlifting	1	–	1
Total	16	0	16

== Athletics ==
Track and road events

Athlete	Event	Heats		Quarterfinal		Semifinal		Final	
Athlete	Event	Result	Rank	Result	Rank	Result	Rank	Result	Rank
Nelson Zamora	Men's marathon	—N/a						2:25:32	54
Ricardo Vera	Men's 3000 metres steeplechase	8:27.71	7 Q	—N/a		8:27.46	12 q	8:26.35	12

== Boxing ==
Athlete	Event	Round of 32	Round of 16	Quarterfinals	Semifinals	Final	
Athlete	Event	Opposition Result	Opposition Result	Opposition Result	Opposition Result	Opposition Result	Rank
Jorge Porley	Light middleweight	Klemetsen (NOR); L RSC R1	Did not advance				
Luis Méndez	Middleweight	Araneda (CHI); L RSC R2	Did not advance				

== Canoeing ==
=== Sprint ===
Athlete	Event	Heats		Repechage		Semifinals		Final	
Athlete	Event	Time	Rank	Time	Rank	Time	Rank	Time	Rank
Enrique Leite	Men's K-1 500 metres	1:49.49	5 R	1:49.00	6	Did not advance			
Enrique Leite	Men's K-1 1000 metres	3:49.02	6 R	3:40.20	6	Did not advance			

== Cycling ==
Two cyclists represented Uruguay in 1992.

=== Road ===
Athlete	Event	Time	Rank
Federico Moreira	Men's road race	4:35:56	50
Sergio Tesitore	Men's road race	4:36:52	74

== Judo ==
Athlete	Event	Round of 64	Round of 32	Round of 16	Quarterfinals	Semifinals	Repechage			Final	
Athlete	Event	Round of 64	Round of 32	Round of 16	Quarterfinals	Semifinals	Round 1	Round 2	Round 3	Final	
Athlete	Event	Opposition Result	Opposition Result	Opposition Result	Opposition Result	Opposition Result	Opposition Result	Opposition Result	Opposition Result	Opposition Result	Rank
Jorge Steffano	Men's –65 kg	Rodet (CHA); W	Sène (SEN); W	Morales (ARG); L	Did not advance						

== Modern pentathlon ==
One male pentathlete represented Uruguay in 1992.

Athlete	Event	Fencing (épée one touch)			Swimming (300 m freestyle)			Shooting (Air pistol)			Riding (show jumping)			Running (4000 m)			Total points	Final rank
Athlete	Event	Results	Rank	MP points	Time	Rank	MP points	Points	Rank	MP Points	Penalties	Rank	MP points	Time	Rank	MP Points	Total points	Final rank
Daniel Pereyra	Individual	11–54	66	405	3:58.0	66	968	170	62	820	DNF		0	15:43.6	65	736	2929	66

== Rowing ==
Athlete	Event	Heats		Repechage		Semifinals		Final	
Athlete	Event	Time	Rank	Time	Rank	Time	Rank	Time	Rank
Jesús Posse	Men's single sculls	7:38.96	5 R	7:31.32	4 SC/D	7:05.53	3 SC	7:18.27	18

== Sailing ==
Open
Match racing

Athlete	Event	Qualification races						Total	Rank	Round Robin	Rank	Semifinals	Final / BM	Rank
Athlete	Event	1	2	3	4	5	6	Total	Rank	Round Robin	Rank	Semifinals	Final / BM	Rank
Luis Chiapparro; Nicolás Parodi; Ricardo Fabini	Soling	10	18	~~31~~	22	23	20	93	16	Did not advance				

== Shooting ==
Athlete	Event	Qualification		Final	
Athlete	Event	Points	Rank	Points	Rank
Fernando Richeri	Men's 10 m air pistol	554	44	Did not advance	

== Swimming ==
Athlete	Event	Heats		Final A/B	
Athlete	Event	Time	Rank	Time	Rank
Gustavo Gorriarán	Men's 100 m breaststroke	1:05.79	40	Did not advance	
Gustavo Gorriarán	Men's 200 m breaststroke	2:21.25	30	Did not advance	

== Weightlifting ==
Athlete	Event	Snatch		Clean & jerk		Total	Rank
Athlete	Event	Result	Rank	Result	Rank	Total	Rank
Sergio Lafuente	82.5 kg	127.5	27	152.5	25	280.0	26

== See also ==
- Uruguay at the 1991 Pan American Games
