= 2014 European Sambo Championships =

Sambo competitions

- Country: Bucharest, Romania
- Organizer: FIAS
- Dates: 15-19 May
- Venues: Polyvalent Hall

The 2014 European Sambo Championships were held in Bucharest, Romania from May 15 to 19 for men's and women's sport Sambo and the Combat Sambo championships was held in Polyvalent Hall.

== Categories ==
- Combat Sambo: 52 kg, 57 kg, 62 kg, 68 kg, 74 kg, 82 kg, 90 kg, 100 kg, +100 kg
- Men's Sambo: 52 kg, 57 kg, 62 kg, 68 kg, 74 kg, 82 kg, 90 kg, 100 kg, +100 kg
- Women's Sambo: 48 kg, 52 kg, 56 kg, 60 kg, 64 kg, 68 kg, 72 kg, 80 kg, +80 kg

== Medal overview ==
=== Combat Sambo Events ===
| Event | Gold | Silver | Bronze |
|---|---|---|---|
| 52 kg | Rustam Konzoshev (RUS) | Farid Yusifov (AZE) | Nikolay Yvailov (BUL) |
| 52 kg | Rustam Konzoshev (RUS) | Farid Yusifov (AZE) | Gintaras Katkus (LTU) |
| 57 kg | Gamzat Saypudinov (RUS) | Mkhitar Mkhitaryan (ARM) | Elvar Osmanov (AZE) |
| 57 kg | Gamzat Saypudinov (RUS) | Mkhitar Mkhitaryan (ARM) | Dumitru Turcanu (ROU) |
| 62 kg | Alexandr Salikov (RUS) | Vaselin Ivanov (BUL) | Vahan Nikolayev (ARM) |
| 62 kg | Alexandr Salikov (RUS) | Vaselin Ivanov (BUL) | Oleksii Bezotosnyi (UKR) |
| 68 kg | Artur Tarkhatov (RUS) | Vachik Vardanyan (ARM) | Anton Brankov (BUL) |
| 68 kg | Artur Tarkhatov (RUS) | Vachik Vardanyan (ARM) | Illia Khadkevich (BLR) |
| 74 kg | Zaur Azizov (RUS) | Charly Schmitt (FRA) | Tihomir Blagovestov (BUL) |
| 74 kg | Zaur Azizov (RUS) | Charly Schmitt (FRA) | Edvard Markarian (UKR) |
| 82 kg | Murad Kerimov (RUS) | Davit Chochishvili (GEO) | Siarhei Filomenka (BLR) |
| 82 kg | Murad Kerimov (RUS) | Davit Chochishvili (GEO) | Maksym Ryndovskyi (UKR) |
| 90 kg | Vyacheslav Vasilevsky (RUS) | Nodar Kundukhashvili (GEO) | Valentyn Moldavskyi (UKR) |
| 90 kg | Vyacheslav Vasilevsky (RUS) | Nodar Kundukhashvili (GEO) | Kamen Georgiev (BUL) |
| 100 kg | Vadim Nemkov (RUS) | Bjoern Bachmann (GER) | Stanislau Kalbasau (BLR) |
| 100 kg | Vadim Nemkov (RUS) | Bjoern Bachmann (GER) | Yevhenii Kikish (UKR) |
| +100 kg | Martin Marnikov (BUL) | Zlimkhan Umiev (RUS) | Dmitri Goras (MDA) |
| +100 kg | Martin Marnikov (BUL) | Zlimkhan Umiev (RUS) | Gheorghe Ignat (ROU) |

=== Men's Sambo Events ===
| Event | Gold | Silver | Bronze |
|---|---|---|---|
| 52 kg | Tigran Kirakosyan (ARM) | Aghasif Samadov (AZE) | Igor Bgleerov (RUS) |
| 52 kg | Tigran Kirakosyan (ARM) | Aghasif Samadov (AZE) | Andrei Kurlypa (BLR) |
| 57 kg | Vakho Chidrashvili (GEO) | Islam Gusamov (AZE) | Aleksey Kuzmenko (RUS) |
| 57 kg | Vakho Chidrashvili (GEO) | Islam Gusamov (AZE) | Borislav Yanakov (BUL) |
| 62 kg | Aslan Mudranov (RUS) | Octavian Nacu (MDA) | Andrejs Magers (LAT) |
| 62 kg | Aslan Mudranov (RUS) | Octavian Nacu (MDA) | Ivan Naviskevch (BLR) |
| 68 kg | Aliaksandr Koksha (BLR) | Levan Nakhutrsishvili (GEO) | Kyrylo Melnychenko (UKR) |
| 68 kg | Aliaksandr Koksha (BLR) | Levan Nakhutrsishvili (GEO) | Evgeniy Sukhomlinov (RUS) |
| 74 kg | Amil Gasimov (AZE) | Besarion Berulava (GEO) | Stsapian Papou (BLR) |
| 74 kg | Amil Gasimov (AZE) | Besarion Berulava (GEO) | Artur Sarkisian (UKR) |
| 82 kg | Aleksei Kharinotov (RUS) | Niko Kutsia (GEO) | Radvilas Matukas (LTU) |
| 82 kg | Aleksei Kharinotov (RUS) | Niko Kutsia (GEO) | Ashot Danielyan (ARM) |
| 90 kg | Arsen Khandzhian (RUS) | Andrei Kaziusionak (BLR) | Edik Petrosyan (ARM) |
| 90 kg | Arsen Khandzhian (RUS) | Andrei Kaziusionak (BLR) | Ivan Vasylchuk (UKR) |
| 100 kg | David Loriashvili (GEO) | Dmitry Minakov (RUS) | Viktors Resko (LAT) |
| 100 kg | David Loriashvili (GEO) | Dmitry Minakov (RUS) | Yauhen Siomachkin (BLR) |
| +100 kg | Evgeniy Isanov (RUS) | Yury Rybak (BLR) | Nodar Metreveli (GEO) |
| +100 kg | Evgeniy Isanov (RUS) | Yury Rybak (BLR) | Razmik Tonoyan (UKR) |

=== Women's events ===
| Event | Gold | Silver | Bronze |
|---|---|---|---|
| 48 kg | Elena Bondareva (25x17px) | Alina Sokolovska (25x17px) | Leila Abbasava (25x17px) |
| 48 kg | Elena Bondareva (25x17px) | Alina Sokolovska (25x17px) | Tatiana Osoianu (25x17px) |
| 52 kg | Alexandra Durnova (25x17px) | Magdalena Varbanova (25x17px) | Rūta Aksionova (LTU) |
| 52 kg | Alexandra Durnova (25x17px) | Magdalena Varbanova (25x17px) | Estelle Friquin (FRA) |
| 56 kg | Anastasiia Arkhipava (25x17px) | Anastasia Valova (25x17px) | Kalina Stefanova (25x17px) |
| 56 kg | Anastasiia Arkhipava (25x17px) | Anastasia Valova (25x17px) | Daniela Hondiu (25x17px) |
| 60 kg | Gergana Vatsova (25x17px) | Nadezhda Zaytceva (25x17px) | Kastiaryna Prakapenka (25x17px) |
| 60 kg | Gergana Vatsova (25x17px) | Nadezhda Zaytceva (25x17px) | Ana Repida (25x17px) |
| 64 kg | Alice Schlesinger (ISR) | Vanya Ivanova (25x17px) | Uliana Bessonova (25x17px) |
| 64 kg | Alice Schlesinger (ISR) | Vanya Ivanova (25x17px) | Alina Boykova (25x17px) |
| 68 kg | Nadiya Gerasymenko (25x17px) | Tea Sukhitashvili (25x17px) | Gabriela Gigova (25x17px) |
| 68 kg | Nadiya Gerasymenko (25x17px) | Tea Sukhitashvili (25x17px) | Ivana Jandric (25x17px) |
| 72 kg | Olesia Volkova (25x17px) | Nino Odzelashvili (25x17px) | Tetyana Savenko (25x17px) |
| 72 kg | Olesia Volkova (25x17px) | Nino Odzelashvili (25x17px) | Anzhela Paim-Kraskouskaya (25x17px) |
| 80 kg | Sviatlana Tsimashenka (25x17px) | Mariya Oryashkova (25x17px) | Gintarė Klišytė (25x17px) |
| 80 kg | Sviatlana Tsimashenka (25x17px) | Mariya Oryashkova (25x17px) | Maryna Pryshchepa (25x17px) |
| +80 kg | Tereza Dzurova (25x17px) | Anastasia Kovyazina (25x17px) | Yelizaveta Maiseynka (25x17px) |
| +80 kg | Tereza Dzurova (25x17px) | Anastasia Kovyazina (25x17px) | Irine Leonidze (25x17px) |

=== Medal table ===
| Rank | Nation | Gold | Silver | Bronze | Total |
|---|---|---|---|---|---|
| 1 | Russia | 15 | 5 | 4 | 24 |
| 2 | Bulgaria | 3 | 4 | 7 | 14 |
| 3 | Belarus | 3 | 2 | 11 | 16 |
| 4 | Georgia | 2 | 7 | 2 | 11 |
| 5 | Azerbaijan | 1 | 3 | 1 | 5 |
| 6 | Armenia | 1 | 2 | 3 | 6 |
| 7 | Ukraine | 1 | 1 | 12 | 14 |
| 8 | Israel | 1 | 0 | 0 | 1 |
| 9 | Moldova | 0 | 1 | 3 | 4 |
| 10 | France | 0 | 1 | 1 | 2 |
| 11 | Germany | 0 | 1 | 0 | 1 |
| 12 | Lithuania | 0 | 0 | 4 | 4 |
| 13 | Romania | 0 | 0 | 3 | 3 |
| 14 | Latvia | 0 | 0 | 2 | 2 |
| 15 | Serbia | 0 | 0 | 1 | 1 |
| Totals (15 entries) | | 27 | 27 | 54 | 108 |
