= Rodet =

Rodet is a surname. Notable people with the surname include:

- Alain Rodet (born 1944), French politician
- Marie Thérèse Geoffrin (née Marie Thérèse Rodet; 1699–1777), French salon holder
- Sakor Rodet (born 1967), Chadian judoka
