= 1989 European Sambo Championships =

Sambo competitions

- Location: Herne Bay, England

The 1989 European Sambo Championships was the second International European Sambo Championships competition of its kind and it was held in Herne Bay, England.

== Medal overview ==
men	Gold	Silver	Bronze
-48 kg	(Mongolia) (MGL)	(Bulgaria) Parvan Parvanov (BUL)	(Bulgaria) (BUL)
-52 kg	(Soviet Union) (URS)^{RUS}	(Bulgaria) (BUL)	(Japan) K. Saito (JPN)
-57 kg	(Soviet Union) Natik Bagirov (URS)^{BEL}	(Mongolia) (MGL)	(Bulgaria) (BUL)
-62 kg	(Soviet Union) (URS)^{RUS}	(Bulgaria) Ivan Netov (BUL)	(Bulgaria) (BUL)
-68 kg	(Mongolia) (MGL)	(Denmark) (DEN)	(Bulgaria) (BUL)
-74 kg	(Soviet Union) Česlovas Jezerskas (URS)^{RUS}	(Mongolia) (MGL)	(Japan) (JPN)
-82 kg	(Spain) (ESP)	(Bulgaria) (BUL)	(United States) (USA)
-90 kg	(Japan) ()	(Bulgaria) Nikola Filipov (BUL)	(Bulgaria) (BUL)
-100 kg	(Spain) (ESP)	(England) Paul Radburn (ENG)	(United Kingdom) (GBR)
+100 kg	(Soviet Union) (URS)^{RUS}	(Bulgaria) (BUL)	(United States) (USA)
