= 2011 World Sambo Championships =

Sambo competitions

- Venue: Siemens Arena
- Location: Vilnius, Lithuania
- Dates: 11-13 November

The 2011 World Sambo Championships were held in Vilnius, Lithuania on November 11 to 13 for men's and women's sport Sambo and the Combat Sambo championships was held in Siemens Arena.

== Categories ==
- Combat Sambo: 52 kg, 57 kg, 62 kg, 68 kg, 74 kg, 82 kg, 90 kg, 100 kg, +100 kg
- Men's Sambo: 52 kg, 57 kg, 62 kg, 68 kg, 74 kg, 82 kg, 90 kg, 100 kg, +100 kg
- Women's Sambo: 48 kg, 52 kg, 56 kg, 60 kg, 64 kg, 68 kg, 72 kg, 80 kg, +80 kg

== Medal overview ==
=== Combat Sambo Events ===
Event	Gold	Silver	Bronze
Half-flyweight (52 kg)	Anatoliy Stishak (RUS)	Almat Suleymenov (KAZ)	Sattor Ergashev (UZB)
Half-flyweight (52 kg)	Anatoliy Stishak (RUS)	Almat Suleymenov (KAZ)	Azamat Asakeev (KGZ)
Flyweight (57 kg)	Marko Kosev (BUL)	Alim ogly Shirinlyulvi (RUS)	Oleg Udot (KAZ)
Flyweight (57 kg)	Marko Kosev (BUL)	Alim ogly Shirinlyulvi (RUS)	Sergii Glushchenko (UKR)
Half-lightweight (62 kg)	Ivan Davidenko (RUS)	Baasankhun Damlanpurev (MGL)	Ilkhom Satvaldiev (UZB)
Half-lightweight (62 kg)	Ivan Davidenko (RUS)	Baasankhun Damlanpurev (MGL)	Nurlan Eraliev (KGZ)
Lightweight (68 kg)	Istam Kudratov (UZB)	Rasim Lemberanskij (GER)	Baurzjan Gumarov (KAZ)
Lightweight (68 kg)	Istam Kudratov (UZB)	Rasim Lemberanskij (GER)	Igor Severyn (UKR)
Welterweight (74 kg)	Shamil Gasankhanov (RUS)	Aleksandr Fjodorov (EST)	Viktor Tomashevich (LTU)
Welterweight (74 kg)	Shamil Gasankhanov (RUS)	Aleksandr Fjodorov (EST)	Maksym Diadiura (UKR)
Half-middleweight (82 kg)	Rosen Dimitrov (BUL)	Alai Nyyazmengliyev (TKM)	Vladislavs Chernjavskis (LAT)
Half-middleweight (82 kg)	Rosen Dimitrov (BUL)	Alai Nyyazmengliyev (TKM)	Saiaush Kasabaev (KAZ)
Middleweight (90 kg)	Oleksandr Kolomiiets (UKR)	Sebastien Libebe (FRA)	Kamen Georgiev (BUL)
Middleweight (90 kg)	Oleksandr Kolomiiets (UKR)	Sebastien Libebe (FRA)	Islam Abasov (RUS)
Half-heavyweight (100 kg)	Victor Nemkov (RUS)	Islomjon Asimov (UZB)	Igor Adernovskyi (UKR)
Half-heavyweight (100 kg)	Victor Nemkov (RUS)	Islomjon Asimov (UZB)	Ruslan Mamatov (KGZ)
Heavyweight (+100 kg)	Martin Marinkov (BUL)	Kiril Sidelnikov (RUS)	Shakhmarl Jetpissov (KAZ)
Heavyweight (+100 kg)	Martin Marinkov (BUL)	Kiril Sidelnikov (RUS)	Denis Smoldarev (EST)

=== Men's Sambo Events ===
Event	Gold	Silver	Bronze
Half-flyweight (52 kg)	Avtandil Tsintsadze (GEO)	Medet Undaganov (KAZ)	Andrei Kurlypa (BLR)
Half-flyweight (52 kg)	Avtandil Tsintsadze (GEO)	Medet Undaganov (KAZ)	Valery Soronokov (RUS)
Flyweight (57 kg)	Yerbolat Baibatyrov (KAZ)	Ushangi Kuzanashvili (GEO)	Islam Gusamov (AZE)
Flyweight (57 kg)	Yerbolat Baibatyrov (KAZ)	Ushangi Kuzanashvili (GEO)	Kerim Allanurov (TKM)
Half-lightweight (62 kg)	Vitaly Uin (RUS)	Boris Borisov (BUL)	Amartuvshin Dashdavaa (MGL)
Half-lightweight (62 kg)	Vitaly Uin (RUS)	Boris Borisov (BUL)	Nurlan Eraliev (KGZ)
Lightweight (68 kg)	Dimitri Bazaylev (BLR)	Sergey Shibanov (RUS)	Martin Ivanov (BUL)
Lightweight (68 kg)	Dimitri Bazaylev (BLR)	Sergey Shibanov (RUS)	Elgun Muslumov (AZE)
Low-middleweight (74 kg)	Uali Kurzhev (RUS)	Stsiapan Papov (BLR)	Dmytro Babiichuk (UKR)
Low-middleweight (74 kg)	Uali Kurzhev (RUS)	Stsiapan Papov (BLR)	Assylbek Alkey (KAZ)
Half-middleweight (82 kg)	Vladimir Prikaschikov (RUS)	Magomed Abdulganilov (BLR)	Niko Kutsia (GEO)
Half-middleweight (82 kg)	Vladimir Prikaschikov (RUS)	Magomed Abdulganilov (BLR)	Sergey Oshlobanu (MDA)
Middleweight (90 kg)	Ivan Vasylchuki (UKR)	Alsim Chernoskulov (RUS)	Ariun-erdene Batbayar (MGL)
Middleweight (90 kg)	Ivan Vasylchuki (UKR)	Alsim Chernoskulov (RUS)	Erkin Doniyorov (UZB)
Half-heavyweight (100 kg)	Artem Osipenko (RUS)	Levan Zhorzholiani (GEO)	Miroslav Debreliev (BLR)
Half-heavyweight (100 kg)	Artem Osipenko (RUS)	Levan Zhorzholiani (GEO)	Hakov Arakelyan (ARM)
Heavyweight (+100 kg)	Vitaly Minakov (RUS)	Yury Rybak (BLR)	David Loriashvili (GEO)
Heavyweight (+100 kg)	Vitaly Minakov (RUS)	Yury Rybak (BLR)	Ivan Iliev (BUL)

=== Women's events ===
Event	Gold	Silver	Bronze
Extra-lightweight (48 kg)	Marina Mokhnatkina (RUS)	Margarita Filippova (TKM)	Maria Guedes (VEN)
Extra-lightweight (48 kg)	Marina Mokhnatkina (RUS)	Margarita Filippova (TKM)	Mirela Salijevic (SRB)
Half-lightweight (52 kg)	Susanna Mirzoyan (RUS)	Gulbadam Babamuratova (TKM)	Dildora Ubaydullaeva (UZB)
Half-lightweight (52 kg)	Susanna Mirzoyan (RUS)	Gulbadam Babamuratova (TKM)	Mariia Ostapiuk (UKR)
Lightweight (56 kg)	Kalina Stefanova (BUL)	Tatiana Zenchenko (RUS)	Solongo Baatarsaikhan (MGL)
Lightweight (56 kg)	Kalina Stefanova (BUL)	Tatiana Zenchenko (RUS)	Raushan Alpysbaeva (KAZ)
Welterweight (60 kg)	Katsiyaryna Prakapenka (BLR)	Olesia Kondratyeva (RUS)	Jackeline Lopez (VEN)
Welterweight (60 kg)	Katsiyaryna Prakapenka (BLR)	Olesia Kondratyeva (RUS)	Ivelina Ilieva (BUL)
Half-middleweight (64 kg)	Anzhela Paim-Kraskouskaya (BLR)	Olga Usoltseva (RUS)	Nadiya Gerasymenko (UKR)
Half-middleweight (64 kg)	Anzhela Paim-Kraskouskaya (BLR)	Olga Usoltseva (RUS)	Gulnar Hayytbayeva (TKM)
Middleweight (68 kg)	Marina Kormiltseva (RUS)	Azzaya Enkhbat (MGL)	Aurelija Šukytė (LTU)
Middleweight (68 kg)	Marina Kormiltseva (RUS)	Azzaya Enkhbat (MGL)	Viktoriia Denysenko (UKR)
Super-middleweight (72 kg)	Svetlana Galyant (RUS)	Tetiana Savenko (UKR)	Maryia Kuzniatsova (BLR)
Super-middleweight (72 kg)	Svetlana Galyant (RUS)	Tetiana Savenko (UKR)	Nino Odzelashvili (GEO)
Half-heavyweight (80 kg)	Natalia Kazantseva (RUS)	Svitlana Gotfird (UKR)	Mariya Oryashkova (BUL)
Half-heavyweight (80 kg)	Natalia Kazantseva (RUS)	Svitlana Gotfird (UKR)	Yelizaveta Maiseynka (BLR)
Heavyweight (+80 kg)	Yuliya Barysik (UKR)	Elena Khakimova (RUS)	Santa Pakenytė (LTU)
Heavyweight (+80 kg)	Yuliya Barysik (UKR)	Elena Khakimova (RUS)	Nina Cutro-Kelly (USA)

=== Medal table ===
Rank	Nation	Gold	Silver	Bronze	Total
1	Russia	14	7	3	24
2	Bulgaria	4	1	5	10
3	Belarus	3	3	4	10
4	Ukraine	3	2	8	13
5	Kazakhstan	1	2	5	8
6	Georgia	1	2	3	6
7	Uzbekistan	1	1	4	6
8	Turkmenistan	0	3	2	5
9	Mongolia	0	2	3	5
10	Estonia	0	1	1	2
11	France	0	1	0	1
11	Germany	0	1	0	1
13	Kyrgyzstan	0	0	4	4
14	Lithuania	0	0	3	3
15	Azerbaijan	0	0	2	2
15	Venezuela	0	0	2	2
17	Armenia	0	0	1	1
17	Latvia	0	0	1	1
17	Moldova	0	0	1	1
17	Serbia	0	0	1	1
17	United States	0	0	1	1
Totals (21 entries)		27	26	54	107
