= Yi Gwang =

Yi Gwang may refer to:

- Yi Gwang (general) (1541–1607), Joseon military general
- Jeongye Daewongun (1785–1841), Joseon prince

== See also ==
- Li Gwang (born 1966), North Korean judoka
