= Pavel Petřikov =

Pavel Petřikov may refer to two judokas, father and son:

- Pavel Petřikov (Czech judoka born 1959)
- Pavel Petřikov (Czech judoka born 1986)
