= Uali Kurzhev =

Russian judoka (born 1989)

Personal information
- Nationality: Russian
- Born: 28 April 1989 (age 37)
- Occupation: Judoka

Sport
- Country: Russia
- Sport: Judo, Sambo
- Weight class: ‍–‍73 kg

Achievements and titles
- European Champ.: R16 (2018)
Medal record
Representing Russia
Men's judo
European Championships
Silver medal – second place	2017 Warsaw	Men's team
IJF Grand Slam
Gold medal – first place	2015 Tyumen	‍–‍73 kg
Bronze medal – third place	2014 Tyumen	‍–‍73 kg
Bronze medal – third place	2018 Ekaterinburg	‍–‍73 kg
IJF Grand Prix
Gold medal – first place	2016 Qingdao	‍–‍73 kg
Bronze medal – third place	2016 Tashkent	‍–‍73 kg
Bronze medal – third place	2017 Tbilisi	‍–‍73 kg
Bronze medal – third place	2017 Zagreb	‍–‍73 kg
Men's sambo
World Championships
Gold medal – first place	2011 Vilnius	‍–‍74 kg
Gold medal – first place	2012 Minsk	‍–‍74 kg
Gold medal – first place	2019 Cheongju	‍–‍74 kg
European Championships
Gold medal – first place	2013 Crema	‍–‍74 kg
Summer Universiade
Gold medal – first place	2013 Kazan	‍–‍74 kg

Profile at external databases
- IJF: 15456
- JudoInside.com: 38754
- Updated on 24 November 2022

Uali Kurzhev (born 24 April 1989) is a Russian judoka, sambo practitioner and submission grappler. He is the gold medalist of the 2015 Judo Grand Slam Tyumen in the ‍–‍73 kg category and a three-time Sambo world champion.

== Career ==
Uali Kurzhev was born on 28 April 1989, he is from the republic of Karachay-Cherkessia.

Kurzhev is a three-time sambo world champion, having won the 74 kg title in 2011, 2012 & 2019. He also won the European Championships in 2013 and the 2013 Summer Universiade.

In Judo he won bronze at the 2014 Tyumen Grand Slam, then gold at the 2015 edition. At the 2016 Tashkent Grand Prix he won bronze, gold at the 2016 Qingdao Grand Prix, bronze at the 2017 Zagreb Grand Prix as well at the 2017 Tbilisi Grand Prix. He also won a bronze at the 2018 Ekaterinburg Grand Slam.

Competing in Submission grappling in October 2022, after he missed hydration twice and became ineligible for the inaugural ONE Grappling World Championship at ONE on Prime Video 3, Kurzhev was submitted by Kade Ruotolo with a heel hook at the 4:26 mark of the 10-minute bout.

Kurzhev was scheduled to face Tommy Langaker on 25 February 2023, at ONE Fight Night 7. Kurzhev was submitted with a heelhook at 2:58.
