= Caleb Jean =

Haitian judoka

Personal information
- Nationality: Haitian
- Born: 25 June 1974 (age 50)

Sport
- Sport: Judo

Caleb Jean (born 25 June 1974) is a Haitian judoka. He competed in the men's half-lightweight event at the 1992 Summer Olympics.
