= Mansour Al-Soraihi =

Yemeni judoka (born 1971)

Personal information
- Born: 15 June 1971 (age 54)

Sport
- Country: Yemen
- Sport: Judo

Mansour Al-Soraihi (born 15 June 1971) is a Yemeni judoka who competed for Yemen at the 1992 Summer Olympics.

== Career ==
Al-Soraihi competed in the half-lightweight class at the 1992 Summer Olympics, he was drawn against Sandeep Byala from India in the second round after receiving a bye in the first round, but he lost so didn't advance any further.
