= Duncan MacKinnon =

South African judoka (born 1970)

Personal information
- Nationality: South African
- Born: 2 May 1970 (age 56) East London, South Africa

Sport
- Sport: Judo

Duncan MacKinnon (born 2 May 1970) is a South African judoka. He competed in the men's half-lightweight event at the 1996 Summer Olympics.
