= Dmitrij Divincukov =

Lithuanian athlete (born 1972_

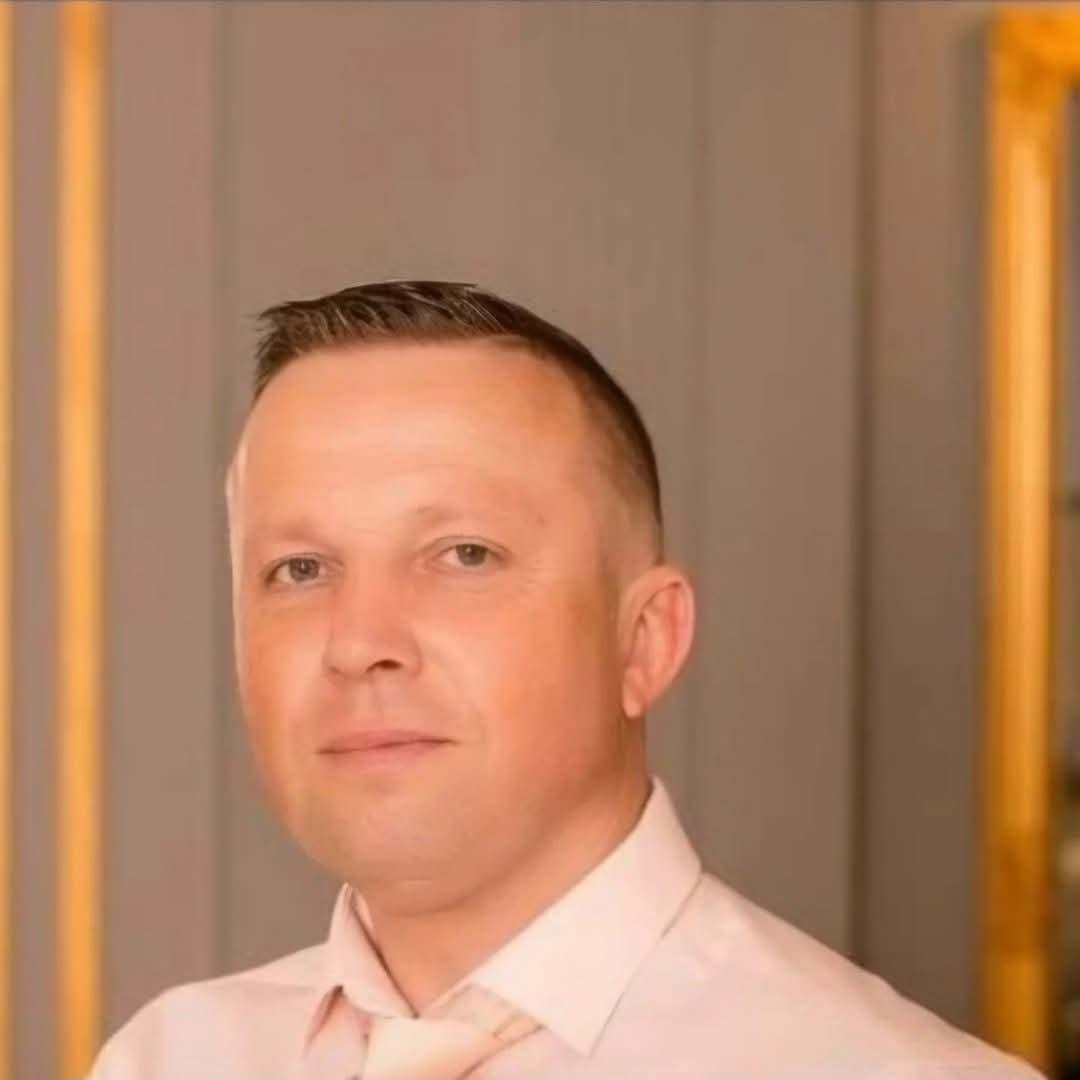
- Dmitrij Divincukov

Personal information
- Born: 13 May 1972 (age 54) Klaipėda, Lithuanian
- Years active: 1982–1992

Sport
- Club: Dynamo (Klaipėda)
- Coached by: Mindaugas Raila

Achievements and titles
- Regional finals: 1992 European Championship (Youth U20), Moscow: Bronze medal (57 kg)

Dmitrij Divincukov (Lithuanian: Dmitrijus Divinčukovas; born 13 May 1972, Klaipėda, Lithuania, is a Lithuanian athlete, master of sport in Sambo (martial art) and Taekwondo (1st Dan black belt). Represented the Lithuanian national team in both sports simultaneously. Also ranks as a 1st Kyu (brown belt) in Judo and became a member of the Lithuanian national veteran Judo team (IJF) .Multiple champion of Lithuania in different age categories, champion and prize-winner of international and all-Union competitions as well champion of the independent state of Lithuania among men Sambo (martial art) (1990 Lithuania Šiauliai). Bronze medalist (57 kg) European Sambo Juniors Championships U20 1992 Moscow Russia Sambo (martial art) , holder of the 1st dan black belt, member of the Lithuanian national team and participant in the World Championship among men (Pyongyang North Korea , sparring 1992) Taekwondo.

== Sports career ==
=== Sambo ===
Divincukov began training in sambo at the age of 10 at the Specialized Olympic Reserve School in Klaipėda. He trained under Mindaugas Raila.

- 1986–1987 – Lithuanian Cadets Champion (up to 48 kg).
- 1988–1989 - Lithuanian Juniors Champion U18 (48 kg).
- 1988 — Champion of the 2nd Lithuanian Juniors Games and silver medalist in team events.
- 1988, 1989 (48 kg), 1990 (52 kg),1992 (57 kg)— Lithuanian Youth Champion (under 20 years).
- 1988 – Lithuanian adult man Champion (48 kg).
- 1989 – Lithuanian adult man Champion (48 kg).
- 1990 – Lithuanian adult man Champion (52 kg) the first Championship held in the Independent country of Lithuania
- 1988 – 5th place at the USSR Youth Championships (16–18 years) in Astrakhan (up to 48 kg).
- 1989 – Top ten at the USSR Championship (Cheboksary, up to 48 kg); the only participant from Lithuanian.
- 1989 – Bronze medalist at the All-Union Tournament of USSR Republics adultman (Klaipėda, up to 52 kg).
- 1992 – Bronze medalist European Sambo Juniors Championships U 20 (Moscow, up to 57 kg).

=== International tournaments ===
- 1988 – Winner of the All-Union Tournament in Leningrad, awarded for best technique (up to 48 kg).
- 1989 – Bronze medalist at the tournament in Panagyurishte, Bulgaria (up to 48 kg).

He was a member of the USSR "Dynamo" team (1988–1989) and in 1989 was the only representative of Lithuania in the USSR junior "Dynamo" team.

=== Taekwondo ===
Since 1989, Divincukov practiced taekwondo at the Klaipėda club "Taek Won Do" under the coaching of Richardas Krisūnas. He competed in the up to 54 kg weight category. In 1992, he joined the Lithuanian national team.p

- Holder of 1st Dan black belt (1992).
- Participant of the Taekwondo World Championship (ITF) in Pyongyang, North Korea (1992), where Lithuania competed for the first time as a member of the International Taekwondo Federation. He was eliminated in the qualification round by the reigning world champion from North Korea.

=== Career end, work career and started veteran JUDO career ===
He ended his sports career in 1992 due to a serious hand injury sustained during training before the World Sambo (martial art) Championship in London.

After concluding his sports career, he went into business, serving as the chief executive officer and owner of the company Vakarų švaros centras. In 2015, he moved to Japan to work as an HVAC mechanic at a Mitsubishi plant. In 2017, he relocated to Rotterdam in the Netherlands, where he works as an HVAC mechanic at Heinen & Hopman. He serves as a reader in the Orthodox Church in Rotterdam and launched his veteran JUDO career.

=== Judo ===
He began practicing judo as a veteran; he was awarded the rank of 1st kyu (brown belt) and became a member of the Lithuanian national veteran judo team." IJF.
