= Kenji Maruyama (judoka) =

Japanese judoka (born 1965)

Personal information
- Born: 21 August 1965 (age 60) Nagasaki, Japan
- Occupation: Judoka

Sport
- Country: Japan
- Sport: Judo
- Weight class: ‍–‍65 kg

Achievements and titles
- Olympic Games: 7th (1992)
- Asian Champ.: (gold) (1991)
Medal record
Men's judo
Representing Japan
Asian Championships
Gold medal – first place	1991 Osaka	‍–‍65 kg

Profile at external databases
- IJF: 53500
- JudoInside.com: 5420
- Updated on 13 May 2025

Kenji Maruyama (born 21 August 1965) is a Japanese former judoka. He competed in the men's half-lightweight event at the 1992 Summer Olympics.
