= 2012 World Sambo Championships =

Sambo competitions

- Location: Minsk, Belarus
- Dates: 8-12 November

The 2012 World Sambo Championships was held in Minsk, Belarus between the 8 and 12 November 2012. This tournament included competition in both Sambo, and Combat Sambo.

== Medal overview ==
=== Combat Sambo Events ===
Event	Gold	Silver	Bronze
Half-flyweight (52 kg)	Almat Suleymenov (KAZ)	Ayniddin Qurbonov (TJK)	Mkhitar Mkhitaryan (ARM)
Half-flyweight (52 kg)	Almat Suleymenov (KAZ)	Ayniddin Qurbonov (TJK)	Tolmaz Tokliyev (UZB)
Flyweight (57 kg)	~~Ali Bagautinov (RUS)~~.	Sergii Glushchenko (UKR)	Farkhod Boboev (UZB)
Flyweight (57 kg)	~~Ali Bagautinov (RUS)~~.	Sergii Glushchenko (UKR)	Asset Sagyndykov (KAZ)
Half-lightweight (62 kg)	Sergej Grecicho (LTU)	Imran Javadov (AZE)	Medet Sagyndykov (KAZ)
Half-lightweight (62 kg)	Sergej Grecicho (LTU)	Imran Javadov (AZE)	Ezher Enchinov (RUS)
Lightweight (68 kg)	Ruslan Gasankhanov (RUS)	Vachik Vardanyan (ARM)	Andrei Demenchuk (BLR)
Lightweight (68 kg)	Ruslan Gasankhanov (RUS)	Vachik Vardanyan (ARM)	Timur Sultanov (UZB)
Welterweight (74 kg)	Alexandr Panov (RUS)	Eduard Muravitski (BLR)	Viktor Tomasevic (LTU)
Welterweight (74 kg)	Alexandr Panov (RUS)	Eduard Muravitski (BLR)	Rustem Seydaliyev (UKR)
Half-middleweight (82 kg)	Aleksey Ivanov (RUS)	Boris Velichkov (BUL)	Aleksandr Fjodorov (EST)
Half-middleweight (82 kg)	Aleksey Ivanov (RUS)	Boris Velichkov (BUL)	Kurmanbek Adil Uullu (KGZ)
Middleweight (90 kg)	Vyacheslav Vasilevsky (RUS)	Umed Khasanbekov (TJK)	Kanatbek Abdullaev (KGZ)
Middleweight (90 kg)	Vyacheslav Vasilevsky (RUS)	Umed Khasanbekov (TJK)	Aleksandr Voronovich (BLR)
Half-heavyweight (100 kg)	Stanislav Kolbasov (BLR)	Genko Ivanov (BUL)	Mikhail Mokhnatkin (RUS)
Half-heavyweight (100 kg)	Stanislav Kolbasov (BLR)	Genko Ivanov (BUL)	Igor Zadernovskyi (UKR)
Heavyweight (+100 kg)	Kirill Sidelnikov (RUS)	Ruslan Aushev (KAZ)	Martin Marinkov (BUL)
Heavyweight (+100 kg)	Kirill Sidelnikov (RUS)	Ruslan Aushev (KAZ)	Yauhemi Tyatushkin (BLR)

=== Men's Sambo Events ===
Event	Gold	Silver	Bronze
Half-flyweight (52 kg)	Igor Beglerov (RUS)	Andrei Kurlypa (BLR)	Tigran Kirakosyan (ARM)
Half-flyweight (52 kg)	Igor Beglerov (RUS)	Andrei Kurlypa (BLR)	Nukri Beraia (GEO)
Flyweight (57 kg)	Islam Gasimov (AZE)	Akmallidin Karimov (TJK)	Sayan kaldar Khertek (RUS)
Flyweight (57 kg)	Islam Gasimov (AZE)	Akmallidin Karimov (TJK)	Yerbolat Baibatyrov (KAZ)
Half-lightweight (62 kg)	Ilia Khlybov (RUS)	Oktavian Naku (MDA)	Bagdat Zharylgasov (KAZ)
Half-lightweight (62 kg)	Ilia Khlybov (RUS)	Oktavian Naku (MDA)	Nozimdin Okhirov (TJK)
Lightweight (68 kg)	Denis Davydov (RUS)	Dzmitry Bazyleu (BLR)	Martin Ivanov (BUL)
Lightweight (68 kg)	Denis Davydov (RUS)	Dzmitry Bazyleu (BLR)	Azamat Mukanov (KAZ)
Low-middleweight (74 kg)	Uali Kurzhev (RUS)	Assylbek Alkey (KAZ)	Dmytro Babiichuk (UKR)
Low-middleweight (74 kg)	Uali Kurzhev (RUS)	Assylbek Alkey (KAZ)	Besarion Berulava (GEO)
Half-middleweight (82 kg)	Aleksey Kharitonov (RUS)	Viktor Savinov (UKR)	Radvilas Matukas (LTU)
Half-middleweight (82 kg)	Aleksey Kharitonov (RUS)	Viktor Savinov (UKR)	Nico Kucia (GEO)
Middleweight (90 kg)	Giorgi Baindurov (GEO)	Eduard Kurginyan (RUS)	Erkin Doniyorov (UZB)
Middleweight (90 kg)	Giorgi Baindurov (GEO)	Eduard Kurginyan (RUS)	Andrei Kazusenok (BLR)
Half-heavyweight (100 kg)	Alsim Chernoskulov (RUS)	Levan Zhorzholiani (GEO)	Yaroslav Rytko (UKR)
Half-heavyweight (100 kg)	Alsim Chernoskulov (RUS)	Levan Zhorzholiani (GEO)	Yauhen Siomachkin (BLR)
Heavyweight (+100 kg)	Yury Rybak (BLR)	Vasileios Iliadis (GRE)	Matthew Clempner (GBR)
Heavyweight (+100 kg)	Yury Rybak (BLR)	Vasileios Iliadis (GRE)	Ivan Iliev (BUL)

=== Women's events ===
Event	Gold	Silver	Bronze
Extra-lightweight (48 kg)	Elena Bondareva (RUS)	Volha Leschanka (BLR)	Kenzhezaru Kashkynova (KAZ)
Extra-lightweight (48 kg)	Elena Bondareva (RUS)	Volha Leschanka (BLR)	Maria Guedez (VEN)
Half-lightweight (52 kg)	Gulbadam Babamuratova (TKM)	Susanna Mirzoyan (RUS)	Sampiliin Solongogerel (MGL)
Half-lightweight (52 kg)	Gulbadam Babamuratova (TKM)	Susanna Mirzoyan (RUS)	Maryna Zharskaya (BLR)
Lightweight (56 kg)	Dorjsürengiin Sumiya (MGL)	Kalina Stefanova (BUL)	Anastasia Valova (RUS)
Lightweight (56 kg)	Dorjsürengiin Sumiya (MGL)	Kalina Stefanova (BUL)	Laure Fournier (FRA)
Welterweight (60 kg)	Yana Kostenko (RUS)	Tumen-Odyn Battugs (MGL)	Katsiyaryna Prakapenka (BLR)
Welterweight (60 kg)	Yana Kostenko (RUS)	Tumen-Odyn Battugs (MGL)	Nadiya Gerasymenko (UKR)
Half-middleweight (64 kg)	Vanya Ivanova (BUL)	Gulnar Hayytbayeva (TKM)	Olena Sayko (UKR)
Half-middleweight (64 kg)	Vanya Ivanova (BUL)	Gulnar Hayytbayeva (TKM)	Anzhela Paim-Kraskouskaya (BLR)
Middleweight (68 kg)	Marina Kormiltseva (RUS)	Volha Namazava (BLR)	Dilbar Umiralieva (KAZ)
Middleweight (68 kg)	Marina Kormiltseva (RUS)	Volha Namazava (BLR)	Nasiba Surkiyeva (TKM)
Super-middleweight (72 kg)	Svetlana Galyant (RUS)	Kalzhan Taizhanova (KAZ)	Maryia Kuzniatsova (BLR)
Super-middleweight (72 kg)	Svetlana Galyant (RUS)	Kalzhan Taizhanova (KAZ)	Tereza Djurova (BUL)
Half-heavyweight (80 kg)	Maryna Pryshchepa (UKR)	Miranda Giambelli (ITA)	Irine Leonidze (GEO)
Half-heavyweight (80 kg)	Maryna Pryshchepa (UKR)	Miranda Giambelli (ITA)	Elena Khakimova (RUS)
Heavyweight (+80 kg)	Anna Balashova (RUS)	Svitlana Yaromka (UKR)	Yuliya Barysik (BLR)
Heavyweight (+80 kg)	Anna Balashova (RUS)	Svitlana Yaromka (UKR)	Karina Bickute (LTU)

=== Medal table ===
Rank	Nation	Gold	Silver	Bronze	Total
1	Russia	17	2	5	24
2	Belarus	2	5	10	17
3	Kazakhstan	1	3	7	11
4	Ukraine	1	3	6	10
5	Bulgaria	1	3	4	8
6	Georgia	1	1	4	6
7	Mongolia	1	1	1	3
7	Turkmenistan	1	1	1	3
9	Azerbaijan	1	1	0	2
10	Lithuania	1	0	3	4
11	Tajikistan	0	3	1	4
12	Armenia	0	1	2	3
13	Greece	0	1	0	1
13	Italy	0	1	0	1
13	Moldova	0	1	0	1
16	Uzbekistan	0	0	4	4
17	Kyrgyzstan	0	0	2	2
18	Estonia	0	0	1	1
18	France	0	0	1	1
18	Great Britain	0	0	1	1
18	Venezuela	0	0	1	1
Totals (21 entries)		27	27	54	108
