= Orlando Fuentes =

American judoka

Personal information
- Nationality: American
- Born: November 19, 1974 (age 51)

Sport
- Sport: Judo

Orlando Fuentes (born November 19, 1974) is an American judoka. He competed in the men's half-lightweight event at the 1996 Summer Olympics.
