= José Pérez (judoka) =

Puerto Rican judoka (born 1965)

Personal information
- Nationality: Puerto Rican
- Born: 10 October 1965 (age 59)

Sport
- Sport: Judo

José Pérez (born 10 October 1965) is a Puerto Rican judoka. He competed in the men's half-lightweight event at the 1996 Summer Olympics.
