= Jean Pierre Cantin =

Canadian judoka (born 1966)

Personal information
- Born: 7 December 1966 (age 59) Schefferville, Quebec, Canada
- Occupation: Judoka

Sport
- Sport: Judo
Medal record
Representing Canada
Commonwealth Games
Bronze medal – third place	1990 Auckland	Half-lightweight
Pan American Games
Silver medal – second place	1991 Havana	Half-lightweight
Bronze medal – third place	1995 Mar del Plata	Half-lightweight

Profile at external databases
- JudoInside.com: 779

Jean Pierre Cantin (born 7 December 1966) is a Canadian judoka. He competed in the men's half-lightweight event at the 1992 Summer Olympics.

== See also ==
- Judo in Quebec
- Judo in Canada
- List of Canadian judoka
