= Tea Sukhitashvili =

Georgian sambo practitioner and judoka

Tea Sukhitashvili თეა სუხიტაშვილი
- Born: March 18, 1993 (age 33)
- Style: Sambo

Tea Sukhitashvili (Georgian: თეა სუხიტაშვილი; born 18 March 1993) is a Georgian sambo practitioner and judoka.

== Career ==
=== Judo ===
As judoka she has participicated at Tbilisi Grand Prix for two times (2014, 2017).

=== Sambo ===
As a sambo practitioner, she has competed in 68 kg category. 2014 European Sambo Championships she won silver medal, lost in final against Nadiya Gerasimneko. She has beaten Bulgarian Gabriela Gigova and Moldovan Nataia Repesco before final match.
