= 1989 World Sambo Championships =

Sambo competitions

- Location: West Orange, USA

The 1989 World Sambo Championships were held in West Orange, USA in November 1989. Championships were organized by FIAS.

== Medal overview ==
men	Gold	Silver	Bronze
-48 kg	(Soviet Union) Askar Shaykhiyev (URS)^{RUS}	(Bulgaria) Dimitar Dimitrov (BUL)	(Mongolia) J. Gambold (MGL)
-52 kg	(Soviet Union) Gurgen Tutkhalyan (URS)^{ARM}	(Bulgaria) Zhivko Shalvarov (BUL)	(Spain) Gorka Sagastume (ESP) (Japan) Taseuka Takeuti (JPN)
-57 kg	(Mongolia) Gankhuyagiin Üürtsolmon (MGL)	(Soviet Union) Rahim Masharipov (URS)^{UZB}	(Bulgaria) Nikolay Gušmakov (BUL) (Japan) Saunaga Kobayashi (JPN)
-62 kg	(Soviet Union) Garik Kazaryan (URS)^{ARM}	(Bulgaria) Ivan Netov (BUL)	(Mongolia) Gan Baatarsüren (MGL) (Spain) P. García (ESP)
-68 kg	(Soviet Union) Vladimir Yaprintsev (URS)^{BLR}	(Mongolia) C. Boldbaatar (MGL)	(United States) Burke Clinton (USA) (Spain) Jorge Bocanegra (ESP)
-74 kg	(Bulgaria) Vasil Sokolov (BUL)	(Soviet Union) Sergey Volobuyev (URS)^{KAZ}	(Canada) Sean O'Heany (CAN) (United States) Matt Vondrasek (USA)
-82 kg	(Soviet Union) Jemal Mchedlishvili (URS)^{GEO}	(Bulgaria) Nikola Filipov (BUL)	(Spain) Jon Idarreta (ESP) (United States) G. Dickson (USA)
-90 kg	(Soviet Union) Igor Sidorkevich (URS)^{RUS}	(United States) Ron Tripp (USA)	(Bulgaria) Anatoliy Zhelyazkov (BUL) (United Kingdom) Craig Scott (GBR)
-100 kg	(Soviet Union) Khasmagomed Dykiyev (URS)^{RUS}	(Mongolia) Ochiryn Odgerel (MGL)	(Bulgaria) Ivaylo Borisov (BUL) (United States) Steve Smith (USA)
+100 kg	(Mongolia) Badmaanyambuugiin Bat-Erdene (MGL)	(Soviet Union) Vladimir Shkalov (URS)^{RUS}	(Bulgaria) S. Simeonov (BUL) (United Kingdom) Matthew Clempner (GBR)
