= Walther Kaiser =

Liechtenstein judoka (born 1973)

Personal information
- Nationality: Liechtenstein
- Born: 23 March 1973 (age 52)

Sport
- Sport: Judo

Walther Kaiser (born 23 March 1973) is a Liechtenstein judoka. He competed in the men's half-lightweight event at the 1992 Summer Olympics.
