= Francisco Lorenzo (judoka) =

Spanish judoka

Personal information
- Nationality: Spanish
- Born: 22 March 1960 (age 66) Madrid, Spain

Sport
- Sport: Judo

Francisco Lorenzo (born 22 March 1960) is a Spanish judoka. He competed in the men's half-lightweight event at the 1992 Summer Olympics.
