= Pürevdorjiin Nyamlkhagva =

Mongolian judoka (born 1974)

Personal information
- Native name: Пүрэвдоржийн Нямлхагва
- Nationality: Mongolian
- Born: 7 October 1974 (age 51) Mongolia
- Height: 168 cm (5 ft 6 in)

Sport
- Country: Mongolia
- Sport: Judo
- Weight class: 65-73 kg

Achievements and titles
- Olympic finals: 9th (1996)
- World finals: 7th (1999)
Medal record
Men's Judo
Representing Mongolia
Asian Championships
Bronze medal – third place	2000 Osaka	66 kg
Bronze medal – third place	1995 New Delhi	65 kg
World Military Championships
Gold medal – first place	1998 St.Petersburg	73 kg

Pürevdorjiin Nyamlkhagva (born 7 October 1974) is a Mongolian judoka. He competed at the 1996 Summer Olympics and the 2000 Summer Olympics.
