= Assaf El-Murr =

Lebanese judoka

Personal information
- Nationality: Lebanese
- Born: 1 January 1967 (age 59)

Sport
- Sport: Judo

Assaf El-Murr (born 1st January 1967) is a Lebanese judoka. He competed in the men's half-lightweight event at the 1992 Summer Olympics.
