= Dănuț Pop =

Romanian judoka

Personal information
- Nationality: Romanian
- Born: 24 November 1968 (age 56); Cluj-Napoca, Romania

Sport
- Sport: Judo

Dănuț Pop (born 24 November 1968) is a Romanian judoka. He competed in the men's half-lightweight event at the 1992 Summer Olympics.
