= Sergey Ashirov =

Kazakhstani judoka

Personal information
- Nationality: Kazakhstani
- Born: 23 February 1965 (age 60)

Sport
- Sport: Judo

Sergey Ashirov (born 23 February 1965) is a Kazakhstani judoka. He competed in the men's half-lightweight event at the 1996 Summer Olympics.
