= Augusto Almeida =

Portuguese judoka (born 1966)

Personal information
- Nationality: Portuguese
- Born: 15 April 1966 (age 58); Porto, Portugal
- Occupation: Judoka

Sport
- Sport: Judo

Augusto Almeida (born 15 April 1966) is a Portuguese judoka. He competed in the men's half-lightweight event at the 1992 Summer Olympics.
