= Rogério Sampaio =

Brazilian judoka (born 1967)

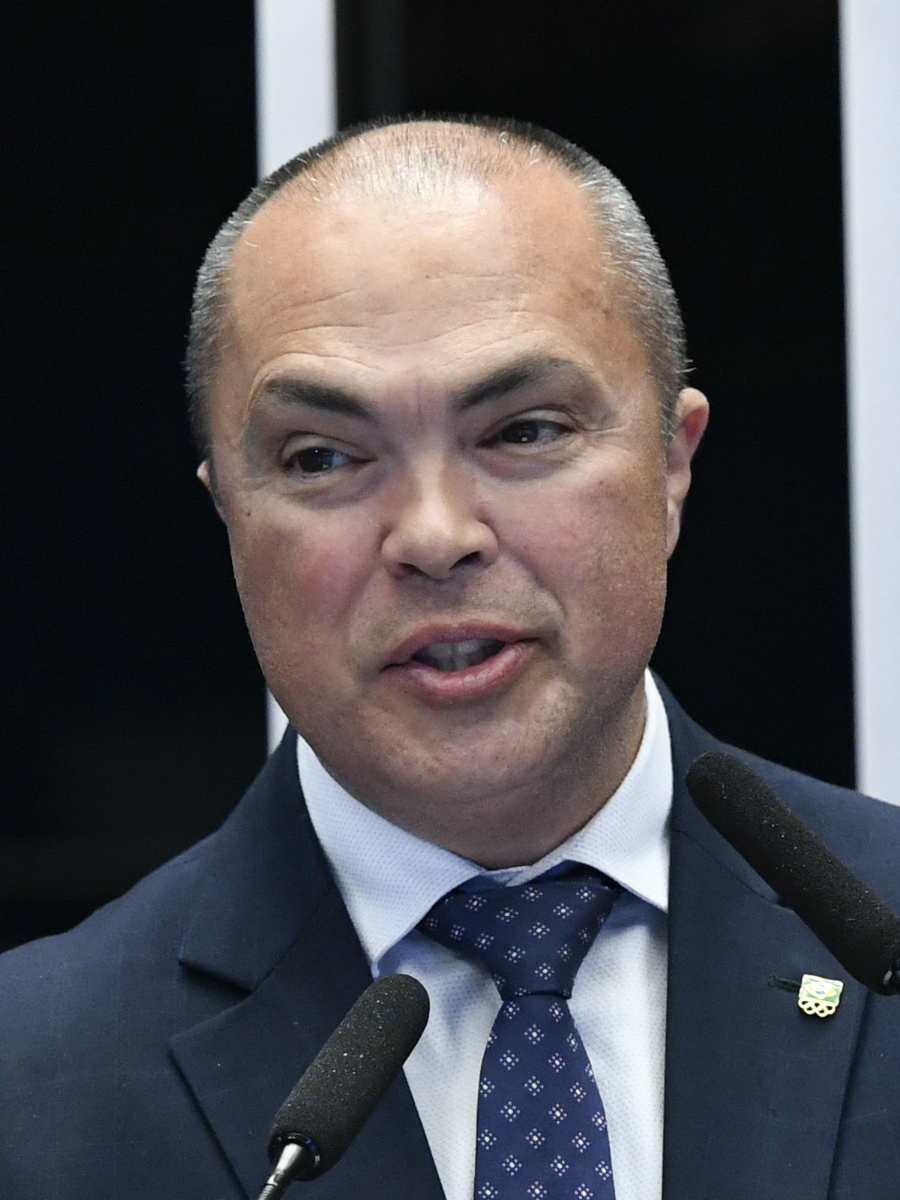
- Sampaio in 2023

Personal information
- Full name: Rogério Sampaio Cardoso
- Born: 12 September 1967 (age 58) Santos, São Paulo, Brazil
- Occupation: Judoka
- Height: 178 cm (5 ft 10 in)

Sport
- Sport: Judo
- Weight class: –‍65 kg, –‍71 kg

Achievements and titles
- Olympic Games: (gold) (1992)
- World Champ.: (bronze) (1993)
- Pan American Champ.: (1986, 1988)
Medal record
Men's judo
Representing Brazil
Olympic Games
Gold medal – first place	1992 Barcelona	‍–‍65 kg
World Championships
Bronze medal – third place	1993 Hamilton	‍–‍71 kg
Pan American Championships
Gold medal – first place	1986 Salinas Puerto Rico	‍–‍65 kg
Gold medal – first place	1988 Buenos Aires	‍–‍65 kg

Profile at external databases
- IJF: 47849
- JudoInside.com: 677
- Updated on 5 June 2023

Rogério Sampaio Cardoso (Note: This name uses Portuguese naming customs: the first or maternal family name is Sampaio and the second or paternal family name is Cardoso.) (born 12 September 1967 in Santos) is a Brazilian judoka and Olympic champion. He won a gold medal at the 1992 Summer Olympics in Barcelona. He dedicated his medal to his brother Ricardo, who fought in the 1988 Summer Olympics and committed suicide in 1991 after a love disappointment.

Sampaio started at judo when he was four, since his mom thought he was restless and needed more discipline. After the Olympics, he won a bronze medal at the 1993 World Judo Championships. But then injuries hurt his career, making him miss both the 1995 Pan American Games and the 1996 Summer Olympics, in which he went only to coach Danielle Zangrando and as a TV commentator. He retired from international competition in 1998.

After retirement, Sampaio runs a dojo in Santos, from which Olympic medalist Leandro Guilheiro originated, and acts as TV commentator. He also coached the Brazilian women's judo team at the 2001 Universiade (fellow Olympic champion Aurélio Miguel coached the masculine).

Rogerio Sampaio is the actual General Secretary of the National Antidoping Agency of Brazil.

His brother, Ricardo Cardoso (5 August 1963 – 28 April 1991) was a Brazilian judoka. He competed in the men's half-lightweight event at the 1988 Summer Olympics. Cardoso committed suicide in 1991.
