= Francesco Giorgi (judoka) =

Italian judoka

Personal information
- Nationality: Italian
- Born: 19 February 1970 (age 56) Cagliari, Italy

Sport
- Sport: Judo

Francesco Giorgi (born 19 February 1970) is an Italian judoka. He competed in the men's half-lightweight event at the 1996 Summer Olympics.
