= Gao Erwei =

Chinese judoka (born 1968)

Personal information
- Nationality: Chinese
- Born: 15 May 1968 (age 58) Dingxiang County, Xinzhou, Shanxi, China

Sport
- Sport: Judo
Medal record
Men's judo
Representing China
Asian Games
Bronze medal – third place	1990 Beijing	65 kg

Gao Erwei (born 15 May 1968) is a Chinese judoka. He competed in the men's half-lightweight event at the 1992 Summer Olympics.
