= 1990 World Sambo Championships =

Sambo competitions

The 1990 World Sambo Championships were sambo competitions held in Moscow, Soviet Union, in 1990. The championships were organized by FIAS.

== Medal overview ==
men	Gold	Silver	Bronze
-48 kg	(Soviet Union) Ceyhun Məmmədov (URS)^{AZE}	(Bulgaria) N. Vrachev (BUL)	(Mongolia) Очирбатын Цогтгэрэл (MGL) (Vietnam) Z. Nguyen (VIE)
-52 kg	(Soviet Union) Gurgen Tutkhalyan (URS)^{ARM}	(Mongolia) N. Enkhbaatar (MGL)	(Bulgaria) V. Donchev (BUL) (Spain) M. Bondar (ESP)
-57 kg	(Soviet Union) Ildus Gabdulkhakov (URS)^{RUS}	(Mongolia) Khaltmaagiin Battulga (MGL)	(France) Kristian Deneville (FRA) (Japan) N. Kobayashi (JPN)
-62 kg	(Soviet Union) Garik Kazaryan (URS)^{ARM}	(Bulgaria) Ivan Netov (BUL)	(Japan) S. Kobayashi (JPN) (Mongolia) Gankhuyagiin Üürtsolmon (MGL)
-68 kg	(Soviet Union) Vladimir Yaprintsev (URS)^{BLR}	(Mongolia) C. Boldbaatar (MGL)	(France) S. Amstet (FRA) (Bulgaria) I. Keremedchiev (BUL)
-74 kg	(Soviet Union) Yevgeny Posadskov (URS)^{RUS}	(Mongolia) Jadambaagiin Sanjansüren (MGL)	(Bulgaria) Vasil Sokolov (BUL) (Spain) Jorge Bocanegra (ESP)
-82 kg	(Soviet Union) Aleksandr Sidorov (URS)^{RUS}	(Mongolia) Sharavgiin Dorjdamba (MGL)	(Bulgaria) Nikola Filipov (BUL) (Spain) Ya. Dabul (ESP)
-90 kg	(Soviet Union) Igor Sidorkevich (URS)^{RUS}	(Mongolia) Sodnomyn Erkhembayar (MGL)	(United States) Ron Tripp (USA) (Japan) T. Ida (JPN)
-100 kg	(Mongolia) Odvogiin Baljinnyam (MGL)	(United Kingdom) Alex Wadden (GBR)	(Soviet Union) Murat Ozov (URS)^{RUS} (Japan) H. Kinosita (JPN)
+100 kg	(Soviet Union) Malkhaz Beruashvili (URS)^{GEO}	(United States) Morris Johnson (USA)	(Mongolia) Dashzevegiin Erdenebat (MGL) (Bulgaria) Damyan Stoykov (BUL)
