= Marko Korhonen =

Finnish judoka

Personal information
- Nationality: Finnish
- Born: 18 August 1969 (age 55); Kajaani, Finland

Sport
- Sport: Judo

Marko Korhonen (born 18 August 1969) is a Finnish judoka. He competed in the men's half-lightweight event at the 1992 Summer Olympics.
