= Ian Freeman (judoka) =

British judoka

Personal information
- Nationality: British
- Born: 8 July 1973 (age 51); Camberley, England

Sport
- Sport: Judo

Ian Freeman (born 8 July 1973) is a British judoka. He competed in the men's half-lightweight event at the 1992 Summer Olympics.

Freeman is a champion of Great Britain, winning the British Judo Championships in 1992.
