= 2019 European Sambo Championships =

Sambo competition

- Venue: Palacio de Deportes de Gijón
- Location: Gijón, Spain
- Dates: 17–19 May 2019

The 2019 European Sambo Championships is an edition of the European Sambo Championships, organized by the European Sambo Federation. It was held in Gijón, Spain from 17 to 19 May 2019.

== Medal summary ==
=== Men's events ===
Event	Gold	Silver	Bronze
−52 kg	Tigran Kirakosyan (ARM)	Evgeniy Eremin (RUS)	Levani Berberashvili (GEO)
−52 kg	Tigran Kirakosyan (ARM)	Evgeniy Eremin (RUS)	Nasimi Umbayev (AZE)
−57 kg	Vladimir Gladkikh (RUS)	Grigor Mkhitaryan (ARM)	Borislav Yanakov (BUL)
−57 kg	Vladimir Gladkikh (RUS)	Grigor Mkhitaryan (ARM)	Irakli Kupatadze (GEO)
−62 kg	Tornike Tsovelidze (GEO)	Maksim Manukyan (ARM)	Tomer Golomb (ISR)
−62 kg	Tornike Tsovelidze (GEO)	Maksim Manukyan (ARM)	Tagir Tagirov (RUS)
−68 kg	Mindia Luluashvili (GEO)	Mikhail Vorobev (RUS)	Rafik Manukyan (ARM)
−68 kg	Mindia Luluashvili (GEO)	Mikhail Vorobev (RUS)	Vladislav Sayapin (BLR)
−74 kg	Maxim Yudin (RUS)	Stsiapan Papou (BLR)	Ashot Martirosyan (BUL)
−74 kg	Maxim Yudin (RUS)	Stsiapan Papou (BLR)	Artur Sarkisyan (UKR)
−82 kg	Sergey Kiryukhin (RUS)	Vahagn Chalyan (ARM)	Alessio Miceli (ITA)
−82 kg	Sergey Kiryukhin (RUS)	Vahagn Chalyan (ARM)	Aliaksandr Kruhlik (BLR)
−90 kg	David Oganisian (RUS)	Cristian Bodirlau (ROU)	Yaroslav Davydchuk (UKR)
−90 kg	David Oganisian (RUS)	Cristian Bodirlau (ROU)	Mistral Janssen (NED)
−100 kg	Dmitry Eliseev (RUS)	Viktors Resko (LAT)	Alieksiei Moisieiev (UKR)
−100 kg	Dmitry Eliseev (RUS)	Viktors Resko (LAT)	Siarhei Lesiak (BLR)
+100 kg	Daniel Natea (ROU)	Beka Berdzenishvili (GEO)	Andrey Volkov (RUS)
+100 kg	Daniel Natea (ROU)	Beka Berdzenishvili (GEO)	Vladimir Gajic (SRB)

Source Results

=== Women's events ===
Event	Gold	Silver	Bronze
−48 kg	Mariya Molchanova (RUS)	Cristina Casas (ESP)	Tsvetelina Tsvetanova (BUL)
−48 kg	Mariya Molchanova (RUS)	Cristina Casas (ESP)	Milene Wojciak (FRA)
−52 kg	Vera Lotkova (RUS)	Paulina Esanu (MDA)	Marina Zharskaya (BLR)
−52 kg	Vera Lotkova (RUS)	Paulina Esanu (MDA)	Anastasiia Novikova (UKR)
−56 kg	Laure Fournier (FRA)	Mariana Donos (MDA)	Tena Šikić (CRO)
−56 kg	Laure Fournier (FRA)	Mariana Donos (MDA)	Kristina Bondar (UKR)
−60 kg	Yana Shevchenko (UKR)	Katsiaryna Prakapenka (BLR)	Aurore Cabanne (FRA)
−60 kg	Yana Shevchenko (UKR)	Katsiaryna Prakapenka (BLR)	Anastasiya Shevchenko (UKR)
−64 kg	Tatsiana Matsko (BLR)	Valeriya Anisimova (RUS)	Olena Sayko (UKR)
−64 kg	Tatsiana Matsko (BLR)	Valeriya Anisimova (RUS)	Alice Perin (ITA)
−68 kg	Hanna Antykalo (UKR)	Volha Namazava (BLR)	Lucija Babic (CRO)
−68 kg	Hanna Antykalo (UKR)	Volha Namazava (BLR)	Ivana Jandric (SRB)
−72 kg	Nataliya Smal (UKR)	Galina Ambartsumyan (RUS)	Victoria Bolohan (MDA)
−72 kg	Nataliya Smal (UKR)	Galina Ambartsumyan (RUS)	Karyna Shut (BLR)
−80 kg	Halyna Kovalska (UKR)	Nino Odzelashvili (GEO)	Ilina Stoyanova (BUL)
−80 kg	Halyna Kovalska (UKR)	Nino Odzelashvili (GEO)	Paula Martinez (ESP)
+80 kg	Elene Kebadze (GEO)	Anastasiia Komovych (UKR)	Maryna Kandratsyeva (BLR)
+80 kg	Elene Kebadze (GEO)	Anastasiia Komovych (UKR)	Evadne Huecas (ESP)

Source Results

=== Combat Sambo Events ===
Event	Gold	Silver	Bronze
−52M kg	Vladimir Lamanov (RUS)	Jon Balayan (ARM)	Vitalii Dobrianskyi (UKR)
−57 kg	Mukhtar Gamzaev (RUS)	Bohdan Babenko (UKR)	Poghos Badalyan (ARM)
−57 kg	Mukhtar Gamzaev (RUS)	Bohdan Babenko (UKR)	Aaron Aneiros (ESP)
−62 kg	Fedor Durymanov (RUS)	Andrii Kucherenko (UKR)	Timur Andres (MDA)
−62 kg	Fedor Durymanov (RUS)	Andrii Kucherenko (UKR)	Jakub Babiar (SVK)
−68M kg	Albert Shangaraev (RUS)	Vasili Astapets (BLR)	Bachuki Bahishvili (UKR)
−68M kg	Albert Shangaraev (RUS)	Vasili Astapets (BLR)	Tariel Abasov (ISR)
−74 kg	Zagit Gaidarov (RUS)	Vadym Burchak (UKR)	Mindaugas Verzbickas (LTU)
−74 kg	Zagit Gaidarov (RUS)	Vadym Burchak (UKR)	Mihael Nikolov (BUL)
−82 kg	Vladyslav Rudniev (UKR)	Yauheni Aleksiyevich (BLR)	Bakhtiyar Abbasov (AZE)
−82 kg	Vladyslav Rudniev (UKR)	Yauheni Aleksiyevich (BLR)	Dejan Gunjavic (CRO)
−90 kg	Roman Egorov90 (RUS)	Petro Davydenko (UKR)	Louis Laurent (FRA)
−90 kg	Roman Egorov90 (RUS)	Petro Davydenko (UKR)	Gyrogy Kozsak (HUN)
−100 kg	Hadis Ibragimov (RUS)	Denislav Zlatev (BUL)	Eduardo Riego (ESP)
−100 kg	Hadis Ibragimov (RUS)	Denislav Zlatev (BUL)	Anatolii Voloshynov (UKR)
+100 kg	Kirill Sidelnikov (RUS)	Vitalii Hrebeniuk (UKR)	Boban Danov (MKD)
+100 kg	Kirill Sidelnikov (RUS)	Vitalii Hrebeniuk (UKR)	Eimantas Vaikasas (LTU)

Source Results

=== Medal table ===
* Host nation (Spain)

Rank	Nation	Gold	Silver	Bronze	Total
1	Russia (RUS)	16	4	2	22
2	Ukraine (UKR)	4	6	10	20
3	Georgia (GEO)	3	2	2	7
4	Belarus (BLR)	1	5	6	12
5	Armenia (ARM)	1	4	2	7
6	Romania (ROU)	1	1	0	2
7	France (FRA)	1	0	3	4
8	Moldova (MDA)	0	2	2	4
9	Bulgaria (BUL)	0	1	5	6
10	Spain (ESP)*	0	1	4	5
11	Latvia (LAT)	0	1	0	1
12	Croatia (CRO)	0	0	3	3
13	Azerbaijan (AZE)	0	0	2	2
13	Israel (ISR)	0	0	2	2
13	Italy (ITA)	0	0	2	2
13	Lithuania (LTU)	0	0	2	2
13	Serbia (SRB)	0	0	2	2
18	Hungary (HUN)	0	0	1	1
18	Netherlands (NED)	0	0	1	1
18	North Macedonia (MKD)	0	0	1	1
18	Slovakia (SVK)	0	0	1	1
Totals (21 entries)		27	27	53	107
