= Carlos Ramírez (judoka) =

Salvadoran judoka

Personal information
- Nationality: Salvadoran
- Born: 16 April 1970 (age 54)

Sport
- Sport: Judo

Carlos Ramírez (born 16 April 1970) is a Salvadoran judoka. He competed in the men's half-lightweight event at the 1996 Summer Olympics.
