= 1974 World Sambo Championships =

Sambo competitions

- Location: Ulaanbaatar, Mongolia
- Dates: September 6–11
- Competitors: 69 participants from 12 countries

The 1974 World Sambo Championships were held in Ulaanbaatar, Mongolia on September 6–11. It was the second World Sambo Championships.

== Medal overview ==
men	Gold	Silver	Bronze
-48kg	(Soviet Union) Sayfuddin Hodiyev (URS)	(Iran) Fatahi (IRN)^{RUS}	(Mongolia) Tucson (MGL)
-52kg	(Soviet Union) Alexey Isaakovich TuxiintorSho (URS)^{RUS}	(Mongolia) [[]] (MGL)	(South Korea) Jung God Kim (KOR)
-57kg	(Soviet Union) Mikhail Mikhailovich (URS)^{RUS}	(Mongolia) [[]] (MGL)	(Bulgaria) (BUL) Parvan Parvanov
-62kg	(Soviet Union) [[]] (URS)^{RUS}	(Mongolia) [[]] (MGL)	(Bulgaria) [[]] (BUL)
-68kg	(Mongolia) [[]] (MGL)	(Soviet Union) [[]] (URS)^{RUS}	(Bulgaria) [[]] (BUL)
-74kg	(Mongolia) Gandolgoryn Batsükh	(Soviet Union) [[]] (MGL)	(Japan) (JPN)
-82kg	(Soviet Union) Česlovas Jezerskas (URS)	(Bulgaria) [[]] (BUL)	(United States) [[]] (USA)
-90kg	(Soviet Union) Alexander Pushnitsa (URS)^{RUS}	(Mongolia) [[]] (MGL)	(Bulgaria) (BUL)
-100kg	(Mongolia) Khorloogiin Bayanmönkh (MGL)	(Spain) Miguel Tejera (ESP)	(Bulgaria) [[]] (BUL)
+100kg	(Soviet Union) Vladimir Saunin (URS)^{RUS}	(Spain) [[]] (ESPN)	(Bulgaria) [[]] (BUL)
