= Henrique Guimarães =

Brazilian judoka (born 1972)

Personal information
- Born: 9 September 1972 (age 53) São Paulo, São Paulo
- Occupation: Judoka

Sport
- Country: Brazil
- Sport: Judo
- Weight class: –‍65 kg, –‍66 kg

Achievements and titles
- Olympic Games: (bronze) (1996)
- World Champ.: 7th (1995, 1997)
- Pan American Champ.: (1999, 2003)
Medal record
Men's judo
Representing Brazil
Olympic Games
Bronze medal – third place	1996 Atlanta	‍–‍65 kg
Pan American Games
Bronze medal – third place	1995 Mara del Plata	‍–‍65 kg
Bronze medal – third place	2003 Santo Domingo	‍–‍66 kg
Pan American Championships
Gold medal – first place	1999 Montevideo	‍–‍66 kg
Gold medal – first place	2003 Salvador	‍–‍66 kg
Silver medal – second place	1994 Santiago	‍–‍65 kg
Silver medal – second place	1996 San Juan	‍–‍65 kg
Silver medal – second place	2002 Santo Domingo	‍–‍66 kg
Bronze medal – third place	1997 Guadalajara	‍–‍65 kg
World Juniors Championships
Silver medal – second place	1992 Buenos Aires	‍–‍65 kg

Profile at external databases
- IJF: 52797
- JudoInside.com: 693
- Updated on 4 June 2023

Henrique Carlos Serra Azul Guimarães (born 9 September 1972 in São Paulo) is a male judoka from Brazil. He won the bronze medal in the men's half lightweight (‍–‍65 kg) division at the 1996 Summer Olympics in Atlanta, Georgia. He repeated the feat at the 2003 Pan American Games in Santo Domingo, Dominican Republic.<
