= Benoît Campargue =

French judoka (born 1965)

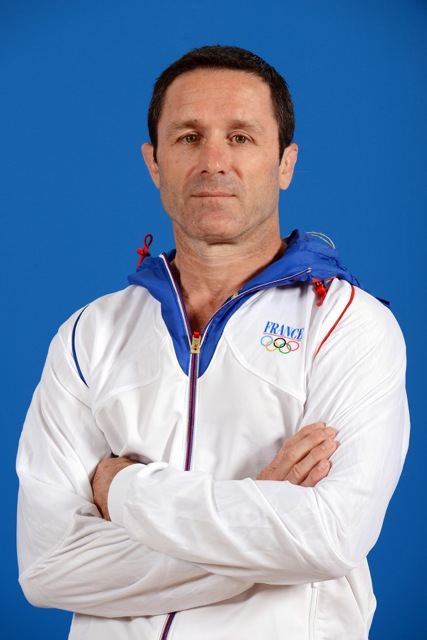
- Portrait of Benoît Campargue

Personal information
- Born: 9 March 1965 (age 61)
- Occupation: Judoka
- Website: benoitcampargue.fr

Sport
- Sport: Judo
Medal record
Men's judo
European Championships
Gold medal – first place	1992 Paris	65 kg
Bronze medal – third place	1994 Gdansk	65 kg

Profile at external databases
- JudoInside.com: 2435

Benoît Campargue (born 9 March 1965) is a French judoka. He competed in the men's half-lightweight event at the 1992 Summer Olympics.

== Achievements ==
Year	Tournament	Place	Weight class
1994	European Judo Championships	3rd	Half lightweight (65 kg)
1992	European Judo Championships	1st	Half lightweight (65 kg)
