= Štefan Cuk =

Slovenian judoka

Personal information
- Nationality: Slovenian
- Born: 19 August 1962 (age 62); Celje, Slovenia
- Occupation: Judoka

Sport
- Sport: Judo

Profile at external databases
- JudoInside.com: 6883

Štefan Cuk (born 19 August 1962) is a Slovenian judoka. He competed in the men's half-lightweight event at the 1992 Summer Olympics.
