= Ciarán Ward =

Irish judoka

Personal information
- Born: 21 January 1970 (age 56) Belfast, Northern Ireland
- Occupation: Judoka

Sport
- Sport: Judo
- Weight class: –66 kg
- Rank: 7th dan black belt

Achievements and titles
- Olympic Games: R32 (1992, 1996)
- World Champ.: R16 (1993)
- European Champ.: 9th (1992)

Profile at external databases
- IJF: 995
- JudoInside.com: 2742

Ciarán Ward (born 17 January 1972) is a judoka who represented Ireland at the 1992 Summer Olympics and the 1996 Summer Olympics and Northern Ireland at the Commonwealth Games.

== Biography ==
At the 1992 Olympic Games in Barcelona, Ward competed at the 65kg half-lightweight division and four years later at the 1996 Olympic Games in Atlanta he once again participated in the half-lightweight category.

Ward was selected for the 1990 Northern Irish team at the 1990 Commonwealth Games in Auckland, New Zealand, where he competed in half-lightweight category,being eliminated by England's Mark Adshead.

In 1989 he was based in Wolverhampton and his younger sister Cora also represented Great Britain and Northern Ireland at international level.
