= 1987 World Sambo Championships =

Sambo competitions

The 1987 World Sambo Championships were held in Milan, Italy in November 1987. Championships were organized by FIAS.

== Medal overview ==
men	Gold	Silver	Bronze
-48 kg	(Soviet Union) Andrey Khodyrev (URS)^{RUS}	(Mongolia) D. Delgerbayar (MGL)	(Bulgaria) Dimitar Dimitrov (BUL)
-52 kg	(Soviet Union) Babamurat Fayziyev (URS)^{UZB}	(France) D. Suarez (FRA)	(Morocco) M. Kumori (MAR)
-57 kg	(Soviet Union) Anton Novikov (URS)^{RUS}	(Bulgaria) Georgi Yusev (BUL)	(Mongolia) B. Terbij (MGL)
-62 kg	(Soviet Union) Aleksandr Aksenov (URS)^{RUS}	(Japan) A. Kuboi (JPN)	(Mongolia) S. Ganbaatar (MGL)
-68 kg	(Mongolia) Galdangiin Jamsran (MGL)	(Soviet Union) Vladimir Yaprintsev (URS)^{BLR}	(Bulgaria) Ivan Netov (BUL)
-74 kg	(Bulgaria) Vasil Sokolov (BUL)	(France) William Béhague (FRA)	(Soviet Union) Erkin Khalikov (URS)^{UZB}
-82 kg	(Soviet Union) Jemal Mchedlishvili (URS)^{GEO}	(Spain) Jon Idarreta (ESP)	(Bulgaria) A. Zhelyazkov (BUL)
-90 kg	(Mongolia) Zunduyn Delgerdalay (MGL)	(Soviet Union) Khamid Khapay (URS)^{RUS}	(Bulgaria) I. Yorgov (BUL)
-100 kg	(Soviet Union) Vladimir Gurin (URS)^{RUS}	(Mongolia) Badmaanyambuugiin Bat-Erdene (MGL)	(Bulgaria) S. Stoyanov (BUL)
+100 kg	(Soviet Union) Vladimir Shkalov (URS)^{RUS}	(Bulgaria) Mincho Petkov (BUL)	(United States) M. Tatum (USA)
