= Pasi Laurén =

Finnish judoka

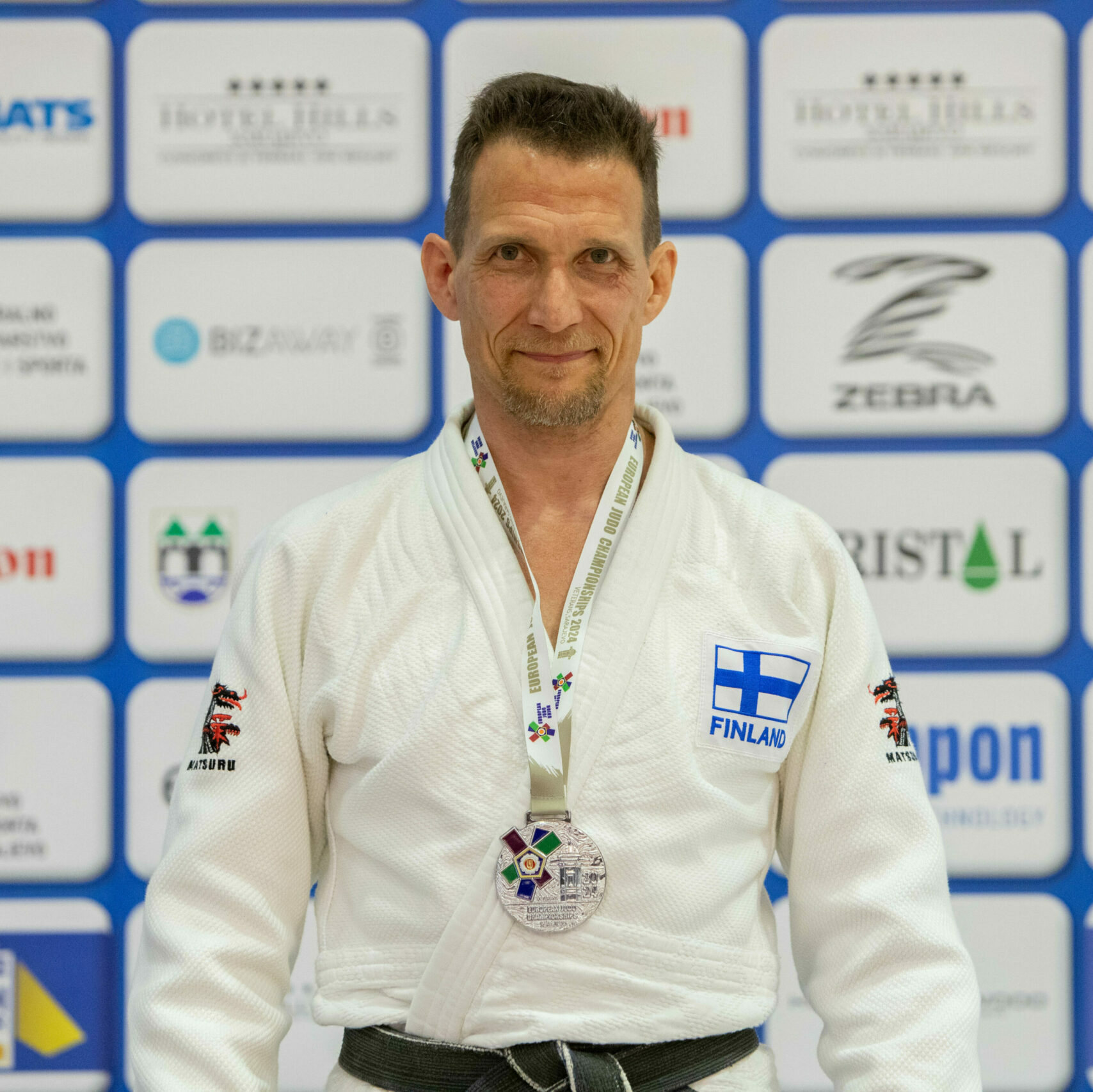

Personal information
- Born: 14 December 1968 (age 56)
- Occupation: Judoka

Sport
- Sport: Judo

Profile at external databases
- IJF: 53325
- JudoInside.com: 2379

Pasi Lauren (born 14 December 1968) is a Finnish judoka. He competed in the men's half-lightweight event at the 1996 Summer Olympics.

== Achievements ==
Year	Tournament	Place	Weight class
1995	European Judo Championships	7th	Half lightweight (65 kg)

Pasi Lauren is also a maestro of Argentinian Tango, teaching all over the world. He spends a lot of time in Buenos Aires each year.
