= Francis Figuereo =

Dominican Republic judoka

Personal information
- Nationality: Dominican
- Born: 29 May 1970 (age 54)

Sport
- Sport: Judo

Francis Figuereo (born 29 May 1970) is a Dominican Republic judoka. He competed in the men's half-lightweight event at the 1996 Summer Olympics.
