= Dambiinyamyn Maralgerel =

Mongolian judoka (born 1972)

Personal information
- Nationality: Mongolia
- Born: 27 March 1972 (age 52); Tsetserleg, Arkhangai, Mongolia
- Died: August 25, 2022 (aged 50); Ulaanbaatar, Mongolia

Sport
- Sport: Judo

Dambiinyamyn Maralgerel (born 27 March 1972) is a Mongolian judoka. He competed in the men's half-lightweight event at the 1992 Summer Olympics.
