= Hussain Mohamed Hassan (judoka) =

Kuwaiti judoka

Hussain Hassan
Personal information
- Full name: Hussain Mohamed Hassan
- Nationality: Kuwaiti
- Born: 20 February 1970 (age 56)

Sport
- Sport: Judo
Medal record
Men's judo
Representing Kuwait
Asian Championships
Bronze medal – third place	1988 Damascus	‍–‍65 kg

Hussain Mohamed Hassan (born 20 February 1970) is a Kuwaiti judoka. He competed in the men's half-lightweight event at the 1992 Summer Olympics.

He won a bronze medal at the 1988 Asian Judo Championships in Damascus in the category -65 kg category.
