= Parvan Parvanov =

Bulgarian judoka

Personal information
- Nationality: Bulgarian
- Born: 6 September 1951 (age 74)

Sport
- Sport: Judo
Medal record
Representing Bulgaria
Men's Sambo
World Sambo Championships
Bronze medal – third place	1973 Tehran	57 kg
Bronze medal – third place	1974 Ulaanbaatar	57 kg
Silver medal – second place	1975 Minsk	62 kg
European Sambo Championships
Silver medal – second place	1972 Riga	58 kg
Silver medal – second place	1974 Madrid	57 kg
Bronze medal – third place	1976 Leningrad	62 kg

Parvan Parvanov (Bulgarian: Първан Първанов, born 6 September 1951) is a Bulgarian judoka. He competed in the men's lightweight event at the 1976 Summer Olympics.
