= Abdoul Karim Seck =

Senegalese judoka

Personal information
- Nationality: Senegalese
- Born: 5 November 1966 (age 58)
- Occupation: Judoka

Sport
- Sport: Judo

Profile at external databases
- JudoInside.com: 3403

Abdoul Karim Seck (born 5 November 1966) is a Senegalese judoka. He competed in the men's half-lightweight event at the 1996 Summer Olympics.
