= Israel Hernández =

Cuban Olympic judoka

Personal information
- Born: 7 January 1970 (age 56)
- Occupation: Judoka

Sport
- Country: Cuba
- Sport: Judo
- Weight class: –‍65 kg, –‍73 kg

Achievements and titles
- Olympic Games: (bronze) (1992, 1996)
- World Champ.: 5th (1991, 1997)
- Pan American Champ.: (gold) (1990, 1994, 1996, 1997)
Medal record
Men's judo
Representing Cuba
Olympic Games
Bronze medal – third place	1992 Barcelona	‍–‍65 kg
Bronze medal – third place	1996 Atlanta	‍–‍65 kg
Pan American Games
Gold medal – first place	1995 Mara del Plata	‍–‍65 kg
Bronze medal – third place	1991 Havana	‍–‍65 kg
Bronze medal – third place	1999 Winnipeg	‍–‍73 kg
Pan American Championships
Gold medal – first place	1990 Caracas	‍–‍60 kg
Gold medal – first place	1994 Santiago	‍–‍65 kg
Gold medal – first place	1996 San Juan	‍–‍65 kg
Gold medal – first place	1997 Guadalajara	‍–‍65 kg
Silver medal – second place	1992 Ontario	‍–‍65 kg
World Juniors Championships
Silver medal – second place	1990 Dijon	‍–‍60 kg
Pan American Junior Championships
Gold medal – first place	1989 Quito	‍–‍60 kg

Profile at external databases
- IJF: 48045
- JudoInside.com: 970
- Updated on 4 June 2023

Israel Hernández Planas (born 7 January 1970, in Santiago de Cuba) is a Cuban judoka. At the 1992 and 1996 Summer Olympics he won bronze medals in the men's Half Lightweight (‍–‍65 kg) category.
