= Jarosław Lewak =

Polish judoka

Jarosław Lewak Dogwater
Personal information
- Born: 2 February 1973 (age 53) Warsaw, Mazowieckie, Poland
Medal record
Men's Judo
Representing Poland
European Championships
Silver medal – second place	1994 Gdansk	65 kg

Jarosław Lewak (born 2 February 1973) is a Polish judoka. He competed at the 1996 Summer Olympics and the 2000 Summer Olympics.

== Achievements ==
Year	Tournament	Place	Weight class
2000	European Judo Championships	5th	Half lightweight (66 kg)
1996	European Judo Championships	5th	Half lightweight (65 kg)
1994	European Judo Championships	2nd	Half lightweight (65 kg)
