= Sandeep Byala =

Indian judoka (born 1967)

Personal information
- Nationality: Indian
- Born: 22 November 1967 (age 57); Amritsar, India

Sport
- Sport: Judo

Sandeep Byala (born 22 November 1967) is an Indian judoka. He competed in the men's half-lightweight event at the 1992 Summer Olympics.
