= Gheorghe Ignat =

Romanian wrestler

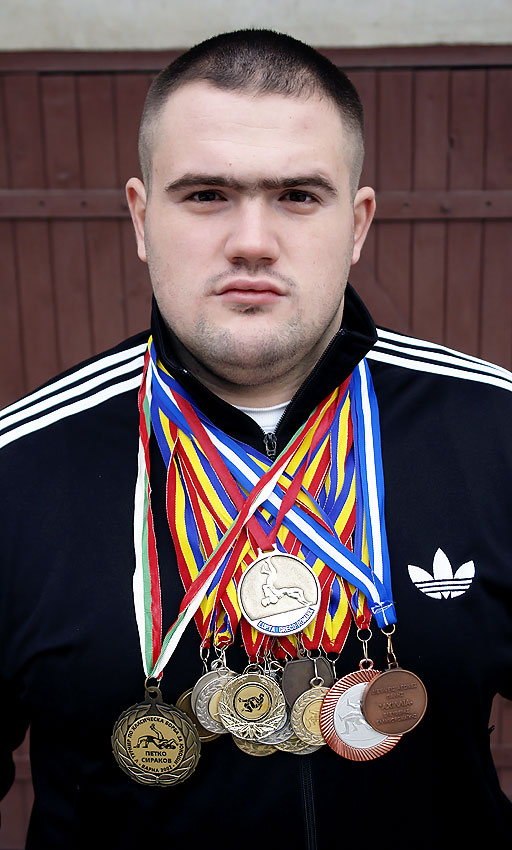
- Born: Gheorghe Ignat; December 11, 1983 (age 42); Suceava, Romania
- Other names: The Carpathian Bear
- Nationality: Romanian
- Height: 6 ft 3 in (1.91 m)
- Division: 265
- Fighting out of: San Diego, United States
- Team: The Arena
- Years active: 2010-present (MMA)

Mixed martial arts record
- Total: 6
- Wins: 6
- By knockout: 2
- By submission: 3
- By decision: 1
- Losses: 0

Other information
- Mixed martial arts record from Sherdog

Gheorghe "The Carpathian Bear" Ignat (born December 11, 1983, in Suceava, Romania) is a mixed martial artist with a background in Greco-Roman wrestling.

== Mixed martial arts record ==
Professional record breakdown
6 matches	6 wins	0 losses
By knockout	2	0
By submission	3	0
By decision	1	0

Res.	Record	Opponent	Method	Event	Date	Round	Time	Location	Notes
Win	6-0	(Hungary) Istvan Ruzsinszki	TKO	Romanian Xtreme Fighting 13	Oct 6, 2014	1	0 30	Botoșani, Romania	
Win	5-0	(Moldova) Vladimir Siminotov	Submission (Americana)	FFG 4 - Full Fight Gala 4	June 9, 2012	1	0 58	Satu Mare, Romania	
Win	4-0	(Austria) Atilla Ucar	TKO	EFC European Fighting Championship	March 24, 2012	2	5 00	Iași, Romania	
Win	3-0	(Romania) Marius Grosu	Submission (armbar)	FFG - Full Fight Satu Mare	July 9, 2011	1	3:30	Satu Mare, Romania	
Win	2-0	(Romania) Marius Bivol	Submission (kimura)	HPF - Hungary vs. Eastern Europe	April 9, 2011	1	1:35	Debrecen, Hungary	
Win	1-0	(United States) Ryan Varela	Decision (unanimous)	Gladiator Challenge - Maximum Force	April 25, 2010	3	5:00	San Jacinto, California, United States	
