= Ivan Netov =

Bulgarian judoka

Personal information
- Nationality: Bulgarian
- Born: 22 October 1968 (age 57) Panagyurishte, Bulgaria

Sport
- Sport: Sambo, Judo
Medal record
Representing Bulgaria
Men's Sambo
World Championships
Bronze medal – third place	1986 Pau	-68 kg
Bronze medal – third place	1987 Milan	-68 kg
Silver medal – second place	1988 Montreal	-68 kg
Silver medal – second place	1989 West Orange	-62 kg
Silver medal – second place	1990 Moscow	-62 kg
Silver medal – second place	1991 Montreal (FIAS)	-62 kg
Silver medal – second place	1992 Herne Bay (FIAS)	-74 kg
Gold medal – first place	1995 Sofia	-68 kg
Bronze medal – third place	1996 Tokyo	-68 kg
World Cup
Bronze medal – third place	1988 Tokyo	-68 kg
World Games
Bronze medal – third place	1993 The Hague	-68 kg
European Championships
Bronze medal – third place	1986 Leningrad	-62 kg
Bronze medal – third place	1987 Sofia	-68 kg
Silver medal – second place	1989 Herne Bay	-62 kg
Silver medal – second place	1991 Netanya	-82 kg
Silver medal – second place	1992 Moscow (FIAS)	-82 kg
Gold medal – first place	1995 Minsk	-68 kg
Bronze medal – third place	1996 Arandjelovac	-68 kg
Silver medal – second place	1997 Baku	-68 kg
Silver medal – second place	1999 Sofia	-68 kg
Men's Judo
Bronze medal – third place	1992 Paris	-65 kg

Ivan Netov (Bulgarian: Иван Нетов, born 22 October 1968) is a Bulgarian sambist and judoka. In sambo, Netov is a multiple-time medalist at the World and European Championships, winning gold at both in 1995. In judo, he won bronze at the 1992 European Championships and competed at the Summer Olympics in 1992 and 1996.
