= Kamen Georgiev =

Bulgarian wrestler and mixed martial arts fighter

- Native name: Камен Георгиев
- Nationality: Bulgarian
- Height: 1.88 m (6 ft 2 in)
- Weight: 92.5 kg (204 lb; 14.57 st)
- Division: 205
- Style: MMA, Judo, Combat sambo, Sanda
- Rank: International Master of Sports in Sambo; Black Belt in Judo

Mixed martial arts record
- Total: 37
- Wins: 26
- By knockout: 9
- By submission: 11
- By decision: 6
- Losses: 10
- By knockout: 4
- By submission: 3
- By decision: 3
- Draws: 1

Other information
- Occupation: Financial manager, MMA coach
- University: Sofia University
- Notable club: Fight club Bulgaria
- Notable school: Judo team BUDO-Sofia University
- Mixed martial arts record from Sherdog
- Last updated on: August 11, 2017

Kamen Georgiev
Medal record

Representing Bulgaria

Men's AFC MMA PRO
Gold medal – first place	2020 AFC MMA pro champion	-93kg

Men's ISFA MMA PRO
Gold medal – first place	2016 World ISFA MMA pro title	-93kg

Men's Combat Wrestling

World Combat Wrestling Championships
Bronze medal – third place	2017 World Combat Wrestling Championships	-100kg
Gold medal – first place	2016 World Combat Wrestling Championships	-100kg
Gold medal – first place	2015 World Combat Wrestling Championships	-100kg

European Combat Wrestling Championships
Gold medal – first place	2018 European Combat Wrestling Championships	-100kg
Silver medal – second place	2017 European Combat Wrestling Championships	-100kg

Men's Sanda \ Sanshou

World Sanda Championships
Gold medal – first place	2013 World Championships by WTKFederation	+90kg
Gold medal – first place	2009 World Championships by IKFederation	+90kg

European Sanda Championships
Gold medal – first place	2011 World Championships by EKFederation	+90kg
Gold medal – first place	2009 World Championships by EKFederation	+90kg

Men's Combat Sambo

World Cup Sambo Championships
Gold medal – first place	2014 World Sambo Cup	90kg

World Sambo Championships
Bronze medal – third place	2016 World Sambo Championships	100kg
Bronze medal – third place	2011 World Sambo Championships	90kg
Bronze medal – third place	2007 World Sambo Championships	100kg

European Sambo Championships
Bronze medal – third place	2022 European Sambo Championships	88kg
Silver medal – second place	2021 European Sambo Championships	98kg
Bronze medal – third place	2015 European Sambo Championships	90kg
Bronze medal – third place	2014 European Sambo Championships	90kg
Silver medal – second place	2012 European Sambo Championships	90kg
Bronze medal – third place	2010 European Sambo Championships	100kg
Silver medal – second place	2007 European Sambo Championships	90kg

Men's Hand Combat

European Hand Combat Championships
Silver medal – second place	2012 European Championships	+90 kg

Men's Pankration UWW rules

World Pankration Championships
Bronze medal – third place	2016 World Pankration Championships	-100kg

Kamen Georgiev (Bulgarian: Камен Георгиев) is a Bulgarian MMA fighter who competes in the Light heavyweight division. World MMA title holder under ISFA rules 2016. MMA ASF PRO (Light-heavyweight champion 2020-), He is a coach of the national Combat wrestling team (until 18 May 2022), and an international referee with a FICW license "A" class in combat wrestling. Also he has won World championships and accolades in multiple sports, most notably in MMA ISFA PRO (Light-heavyweight champion 2016-), World Combat Wrestling Championship (Champion under 100 kg, 2015, 2016), European Combat Wrestling Championship(Champion under 100 kg, 2018), World Sanda Championship (Heavyweight Champion 2009, 2011) and FIAS World Combat Sambo Cup(Champion under 90 kg, 2014).

== Titles ==
- MMA ASF PRO (Light-heavyweight champion 2020, February 15, Serbia)
- World MMA Champion under ISFA rules 2016, September 17 (revenge with Yuri Gorbenko)
- World Combat Wrestling Champion 2015 and 2016 under 100 kg
- World cup Combat Sambo 1st place 2014, Burgas 6 September
- World Sanda / Sanshou Champion 2009, Sofia 22 November; and 2013, Kavarna 19 July
- European Sanda / Sanshou Champion 2009, Sofia 31 May and 2011, Sofia 18 December
- European Combat Wrestling Champion under 100 kg, 2018, Romania
- Sanda / Sanshou national champion 7 times
- Balkan Sanda / Sanshou Champion 2007
- BJJ national champion 2009, 2010 and 2011
- Vice European Combat Sambo Champion
- Vice European Hand Combat Champion 2012 over 90 kg
- Combat Sambo national champion 9 times
- No gi Grappling champion 5 times
- Judo champion
- Jiu-Jutsu fighting champion
- Savate national champion May 2022

== Mixed martial arts record ==
Professional record breakdown
35 matches	25 wins	9 losses
By knockout	8	3
By submission	11	3
By decision	6	3
Draws	1	

Res.	Record	Opponent	Method	Event	Date	Round	Time	Location	Notes
Win	26–10–1	Ivan Vicic	Submission (Guillotine Choke)	BFC - Battle for Caribrod	September 22, 2016	1	1:27	Caribrod, Serbia	
Win	25–10–1	Yuri Gorbenko	Submission (Toe Hold)	ISFA 2 - Gorbenko vs. Georgiev	September 17, 2016	3	2:32	Goce Delchev, Bulgaria	Title Match for ISFA PRO MMA Light-Heavy Weight Belt
Win	24–10–1	Andrei Petre Nastac	Submission (Guillotine Choke)	Maxfight - Warriors 38	April 26, 2016	1	2:46	Varna, Bulgaria	
Win	23–10–1	Emil Plovdiv	TKO (Punches)	Twins MMA	April 2, 2016	1	2:05	Veliko Tarnovo, Bulgaria	
Win	22–10–1	Aidan Aidan	Decision (unanimous)	Twins MMA	September 26, 2015	3	5:00	Gorna Oriahovica, Bulgaria	
Loss	21–10–1	Tomislav Spahović	Decision (unanimous)	FFC07: Sarajevo	March 13, 2015	3	5:00	Sarajevo, Bosnia and Herzegovina	
Win	21–9–1	Lazar Todev	Decision (unanimous)	Twins MMA 8 - Dimitrov vs. Plasaris	December 13, 2014	3	5:00	Sofia, Bulgaria	
Win	20–9–1	Georgi Dimitrov	Submission (rear naked choke)	Twins MMA 7 - Dimitrov vs. Anagnostopoulos	October 2, 2014	1	4:55	Sofia, Bulgaria	
Win	19–9–1	Milan Simonovich	Submission (arm-triangle choke)	Arena MMA Plovdiv - Fight Night 3	September 20, 2014	2	0:35	Plovdiv, Bulgaria	
Win	18–9–1	Hristo Yordanov	Submission (rear naked choke)	Arena MMA Plovdiv - Fight Night 1	March 7, 2014	3	2:32	Plovdiv, Bulgaria	
Win	17–9–1	Milosh Doichinovich	Submission (rear naked choke)	Twins MMA 4 - Nobrega vs. Mitkov	February 6, 2014	2	1:50	Sofia, Bulgaria	
Win	16–9–1	Zsolt Balla	Decision (unanimous)	RXF 7 - Romanian Xtreme Fighting	September 27, 2013	3	5:00	Pitești, Romania	
Win	15–9–1	Marko Radulovic	KO (head kick)	MMAUF - MMA Ultimate Fighting 1	September 21, 2013	1	1:00	Dimitrovgrad, Serbia	
Win	14–9–1	Veselin Parashkevov	Submission (rear naked choke)	TWINS MMA-2	June 8, 2013	1	4:25	Sofia, Bulgaria	
Win	13–9–1	Daniel Iliev	Submission (rear naked choke)	TWINS MMA-1 and Max Fight-31	March 1, 2013	2	2:45	Sofia, Bulgaria	
Win	12–9–1	Simeon Kichukov	TKO (punches)	BMMAF - Max Fight 29	Aug 2, 2012	2	3:41	Sveti Vlas, Bulgaria	
Loss	11–9–1	Emil Samuilov Zahariev	TKO (punches)	BMMAF - Max Fight 28	June 16, 2012	2	4:28	Sofia, Bulgaria	
Loss	11–8–1	Yuri Gorbenko	KO (punch)	FDI Real Kech - Battle of Sofia	September 17, 2011	3	N/A	Sofia, Bulgaria	
Win	11–7–1	Alexander Kozienko	TKO (punches)	FDI Real Kech - Battle of Sofia	September 17, 2011	1	N/A	Sofia, Bulgaria	
Win	10–7–1	Piotr Adamczuk	Submission (armbar)	EMMA - Explosive 1	May 21, 2011	1	3:02	Bradford, England	
Win	9–7–1	Autimio Antonia	KO (head kick)	Victory Combat Sports 1	March 20, 2011	1	2:02	Vienna, Austria	
Loss	8–7–1	Baga Agaev	Submission (armbar)	RPC 10 - Rising Force	February 18, 2011	1	3:10	Sofia, Bulgaria	
Win	8–6–1	Julian Chilikov	TKO (punches)	RPC 9 - Collision	October 9, 2010	2	2:11	Sofia, Bulgaria	
Win	7–6–1	Cătălin Zmărăndescu	Decision (unanimous)	Local Kombat "Bătălia Balcanilor"	July 16, 2010	2	5:00	Constanța, Romania	
Win	6–6–1	Stanoy Tabakov	KO (punches)	RPC: Domination	April 4, 2010	1	4:00	Sofia, Bulgaria	
Loss	5–5-1	Emil Samuilov Zahariev	Submission (heel hook)	2009 BMMAF - Warriors 12	November 21, 2009	1	3:59	Ruse, Bulgaria	
Win	5–4–1	Aleksander Radosavljevic	Decision (unanimous)	WFC 7	April 4, 2009	3	5:00	Sofia, Bulgaria	
Draw	4–4–1	Emil Samuilov Zahariev	Draw	BMMAF: Warriors 6	November 8, 2008	2	5:00	Stara Zagora, Bulgaria	
Win	4–4	Stanimir Petrov	Submission (rear naked choke)	BMMAF: Warriors 5	September 28, 2008	1	4:12	Plovdiv, Bulgaria	
Loss	3–4	Georgi Todorchev	Decision (split)	BMMAF: Warriors 4	August 3, 2008	2	5:00	Sveti Vlas, Bulgaria	
Loss	3–3	Roman Savochka	Submission (achilles lock)	WAFC: World Pankration Championship 2008	May 24, 2008	1	0:50	Khabarovsk, Khabarovsk Krai, Russia	
Win	3–2	Bashir Yamilkhanov	KO (soccer kick)	WAFC: World Pankration Championship 2008	May 24, 2008	1	4:50	Khabarovsk, Khabarovsk Krai, Russia	
Loss	2–2	Blagoi Ivanov	TKO (corner stoppage)	FM - Fitness Mania	October 13, 2007	1	5:00	Pazardzhik, Bulgaria	
Win	2–1	Emil Zahariev	Decision	Shooto - Bulgaria	October 2, 2007	2	5:00	Bulgaria	
Win	1–1	Yvor Marinchev	Submission (rear naked choke)	Day of the champions-2	Sep 15, 2007	1	4:02	Haskovo, Bulgaria	
Loss	0–1	S. N.	TKO (punches illigal elbow)	Shooto-2, Bulgaria	May 12, 2007	1	2:11	Pazardzhik, Bulgaria	
