= Najib Aga =

Indian judoka

Personal information
- Full name: Mirza Najib Aga
- Nationality: Indian
- Born: 5 January 1977 (age 49)

Sport
- Country: India
- Sport: Judo
- Club: Border Security Force
Medal record
Men's Judo
Representing India
Asian Judo Championships
Silver medal – second place	1995 New Delhi	–65 kg
- Updated on 28 July 2014

Najib Aga (born 5 January 1977) is a former Indian judoka. For his contribution to sports, he was awarded the Ekalavya Award in 1994, by the government of Karnataka.

== Career ==
Najib Aga won the silver medal in the 65 kg category at the 1995 Asian Judo Championships in New Delhi. He competed in the 65 kg weight class at the 1996 Summer Olympics in Atlanta, US. He won the gold medal in the 73 kg weight category, in the 1998–99 Senior national Judo Championships in Bangalore. In the 1997 International Judo Championships in Indonesia, he won the bronze medal in the 71 kg class. He also represented the Border Security Force at the all-India Police Games and won medals, including a bronze in 2005, in the 66 kg category.

== Later life ==
Post his retirement from judo, Aga launched a gym named Energy gym in Bangalore in 2004. In 2010, he contested in the BBMP municipal elections of Bangalore, from ward number 111, Shantala Nagar.
