= Li Gwang =

North Korean judoka

Personal information
- Nationality: North Korean
- Born: 22 September 1966 (age 58)

Sport
- Sport: Judo

Li Gwang (born 22 September 1966) is a North Korean judoka. He competed in the men's half-lightweight event at the 1992 Summer Olympics.
