= József Csák =

Hungarian judoka (born 1966)

Personal information
- Born: 10 November 1966 (age 59)
- Occupation: Judoka

Sport
- Country: Hungary
- Sport: Judo

Achievements and titles
- Olympic Games: (silver) (1992)
- World Champ.: 5th (1995)
- European Champ.: (gold) (1986)
Medal record
Men's judo
Representing Hungary
Olympic Games
Silver medal – second place	1992 Barcelona	‍–‍65 kg
European Championships
Gold medal – first place	1986 Belgrade	‍–‍60 kg
Silver medal – second place	1991 Prague	‍–‍65 kg
Silver medal – second place	2000 Wrocław	‍–‍66 kg
Bronze medal – third place	1989 Helsinki	‍–‍65 kg
European Junior Championships
Bronze medal – third place	1986 Leonding	‍–‍60 kg

Profile at external databases
- IJF: 49750
- JudoInside.com: 2687
- Updated on 4 June 2023

József Csák (born 10 November 1966) is a Hungarian judoka. He competed at four Olympic Games.

== Achievements ==
Year	Tournament	Place	Weight class
2000	European Judo Championships	2nd	Half lightweight (66 kg)
1998	European Judo Championships	7th	Half lightweight (66 kg)
1997	European Judo Championships	5th	Half lightweight (65 kg)
1996	Olympic Games	5th	Half lightweight (65 kg)
1995	World Judo Championships	5th	Half lightweight (65 kg)
1993	World Judo Championships	7th	Half lightweight (65 kg)
1992	Olympic Games	2nd	Half lightweight (65 kg)
1991	European Judo Championships	2nd	Half lightweight (65 kg)
1990	European Judo Championships	7th	Half lightweight (65 kg)
1989	European Judo Championships	3rd	Half lightweight (65 kg)
1986	European Judo Championships	1st	Extra lightweight (60 kg)
