= 1972 European Sambo Championships =

Sambo competitions

- Location: Riga, Latvia

The 1972 European Sambo Championships was the first International Sambo competition of its kind and it was held in Riga, Latvia.

== Medal overview ==
men	Gold	Silver	Bronze
-58kg	(Mongolia) [[]] (MGL)	(Bulgaria) Parvan Parvanov (BUL)	(Bulgaria) [[]] (BUL)
-62kg	(Soviet Union) [[]] (URS)^{RUS}	(Bulgaria) [[]] (BUL)	(Japan) K. Saito (JPN)
-66kg	(Soviet Union) [[]] (URS)^{RUS}	(Mongolia) [[]] (MGL)	(Bulgaria) (BUL)
-70kg	(Soviet Union) Vladimir Nevzorov (URS)^{RUS}	(Mongolia) [[]] (MGL)	(Bulgaria) [[]] (BUL)
-75kg	(Mongolia) [[]] (MGL)	(Japan) Koji Kuramoto (JPN)	(Bulgaria) [[]] (BUL)
-80kg	(Soviet Union) Česlovas Jezerskas (URS)^{RUS}	(Mongolia) [[]] (MGL)	(Japan) (JPN)
-86kg	(Spain) [[]] (ESP)	(Bulgaria) [[]] (BUL)	(United States) [[]] (USA)
-90kg	(Japan) Nobuyuki Sato (JPN)	(Soviet Union) Valery Rukhledev (URS)	(Bulgaria) (BUL)
-100kg	(Soviet Union) Serhiy Novikov (URS)^{RUS}	(Spain) Miguel Tejera (ESP)	(Bulgaria) [[]] (BUL)
+100kg	(Soviet Union) Vitali Kuznetsov (URS)^{RUS}	(Bulgaria) [[]] (BUL)	(United States) [[]] (USA)
