= Stig Traavik =

Norwegian diplomat

Personal information
- Full name: Stig Ingemar Traavik
- Nationality: Norwegian
- Born: 19 December 1967 (age 58) Haugesund, Norway
- Occupations: civil servant and diplomat

Sport
- Sport: Judo

Profile at external databases
- JudoInside.com: 5569

Stig Ingemar Traavik (born 19 December 1967 in Haugesund) is a Norwegian civil servant and diplomat. He is currently administrative head of the Norwegian Green Party's parliamentary group. He has worked with venture capital and renewable energy in Southeast Asia.

== Athletics ==
He is a two times national champion and competed in judo at the 1992 Summer Olympics in Barcelona.

== Civil service ==
He joined the Ministry of Foreign Affairs in 1994. He was assigned to the Norwegian Embassy in Abidjan from 1997 to 2000. From 2000 to 2002 he served in the Norwegian mission in Geneva. From 2002 to 2003 he was the deputy head of the Norwegian Embassy in Afghanistan. From 2003 to 2004 he was an adviser to the Afghan Government to lift sanctions from the International Olympic Committee and prepare Afghanistan's participation in the Olympic Games in Athens in 2004. He pioneered sports for women in Afghanistan. He went on to lead the Norwegian Refugee Council's operations in Afghanistan and Pakistan until 2006. In 2007, he was appointed Chief of Staff to the Minister of International Development. He was appointed as ambassador to Indonesia in 2012. In Indonesia he developed a close relationship with key Indonesian decision makers, including with then Governor and later president Joko Widodo. He was recalled in 2016 as a result of extra-marital affairs. He accepted criticism for not having declared a formal conflict of interest concerning a local NGO which was funded by the Norwegian embassy, although investigations proved that no funds had been misallocated, misused or approved without justification. Norwegian newspapers VG and Finansavisen were later reprimanded for their coverage of the controversy. After returning to Norway he worked as special adviser in the Ministry of Foreign Affairs from 2017. From 2019 he was working on international conservation and climate issues as a special envoy for the Norwegian Government's International Climate and Forest Initiative. In 2020, he was appointed as a director in the Norwegian Aid Directorate - Norad.

In 2023, he became head of the administration in the Norwegian Green Partys parliamentary group.
