= Pavel Petřikov (Czech judoka born 1959) =

Czech judoka

Personal information
- Nationality: Czech
- Born: 1 July 1959 (age 66) Slaný, Czechoslovakia

Sport
- Sport: Judo
Medal record
Men's Judo
Friendship Games
| Bronze medal – third place | 1984 Moscow | Extra Lightweight 60 kg |

Pavel Petřikov (born 1 July 1959) is a Czech judoka. He competed at the 1980, 1988 and the 1992 Summer Olympics. He is the father of Czech judoka Pavel Petřikov Jr.
