= Nino Odzelashvili =

Georgian sambo practitioner and judoka

Nino Odzelashvili ნინო ოძელაშვილი
- Born: December 30, 1990 (age 35)
- Style: Sambo

Nino Odzelashvili (Georgian: ნინო ოძელაშვილი; born 30 December 1990) is a Georgian sambo practitioner and judoka.

== Career ==
=== Judo ===
As judoka she has participicated World Cup Sofia 2009, European Championships Tbilisi 2009, World Championships Rotterdam 2009, World Cup Warsaw 2010, World Cup Sofia 2011, World Cup Prague 2011, European Championships Istanbul 2011, Grand Slam Moscow 2011, World Cup Madrid 2011, World Cup Lisbon 2011, Grand Prix Tbilisi 2014, European Games 2015, European Open Sofia 2016, Tbilisi Grand Prix 2017, Minsk European Open 2017, World Senior Championship Budapest 2017, World Senior Championship Teams 2017, Tbilisi Grand Prix 2018. As a Judoka, she was eliminated from 2015 European Games by Belgian Lola Mansour at round of 32. She was eliminated from the first round of 2017 World Judo Championships.

=== Sambo ===
As a sambo practitioner, she has competed in -72 kg and -80 kg categories. In 2014, she won a silver medal at World Sambo Championships, lost final to Russian Irina Alekseeva (-72 kg).

In 2020 she has won a gold medal at European Cup held in Minsk.

In 2018 she became a world champion in Sambo, beaten Romanian Lorena Podelenczki.

In 2019 she won a silver medal at 2019 European Sambo Championships.

In 2022 she became a champion of European Sambo Cup.

She won a bronze medals at 2016 and 2017 World Sambo Championships.

== Personal life ==
She is divorced. In TV show, she has later talked about her former husband who was a soldier who fought in Afghanistan war. She has spoken out about marriage problems and physical abuse.
