= Philip Laats =

Belgian judoka

Personal information
- Born: 2 February 1963 (age 63)
- Occupation: Judoka

Sport
- Sport: Judo
Medal record
Men's judo
European Championships
Bronze medal – third place	1990 Frankfurt	65 kg
Bronze medal – third place	1995 Birmingham	65 kg

Profile at external databases
- JudoInside.com: 1952

Philip Laats (born 2 February 1963) is a Belgian judoka who competed at the international and world level.

Philip is part of a family of judokas, including his brother Johan Laats.

Laats represented Belgium in the Summer Olympics, competing in the half-lightweight category on four occasions - Los Angeles in 1984, Seoul in 1988, Barcelona in 1992 and Atlanta in 1996.

== Achievements ==
Year	Tournament	Place	Weight class
1996	Olympic Games	5th	Half lightweight (65 kg)
1996	European Judo Championships	7th	Half lightweight (65 kg)
1995	European Judo Championships	3rd	Half lightweight (65 kg)
1993	World Judo Championships	5th	Half lightweight (65 kg)
1993	European Judo Championships	7th	Half lightweight (65 kg)
1992	Olympic Games	5th	Half lightweight (65 kg)
1990	European Judo Championships	3rd	Half lightweight (65 kg)
