= Pierre Sène =

Senegalese judoka

Personal information
- Nationality: Senegalese
- Born: 5 April 1964 (age 60)

Sport
- Sport: Judo

Pierre Yves Fily Sène (born 5 April 1964) is a Senegalese former judoka. He competed at the 1988 Summer Olympics and the 1992 Summer Olympics.
