= Sakor Rodet =

Chadian judoka

Sakor Rodet (born September 3, 1967) is a judoka who competed internationally for Chad.

Rodet represented Chad at the 1992 Summer Olympics in Barcelona in the half-lightweight (60-66 kg) category, he lost in the first round to Jorge Steffano from Uruguay so did not advance any further.
