= European Sambo Championships =

Sambo competitions

Competition details
- Discipline: Sambo
- Type: Annual
- Organiser: European Sambo Federation (ESF)

The European Sambo Championships is the main sambo championships in Europe, organized by the European Sambo Federation. The first championship was held in 1972 in Riga, Latvia. Ukraine planned to boycott the 2022 European Sambo Championships because Russian and Belarusian athletes would be allowed to compete with neutral status. Unlike most international federations, the International Sambo Federation (FIAS) has not banned Russian and Belarusians in response to the 2022 Russian invasion of Ukraine.

== Editions (Seniors) ==
Edition	Year	Host City	Country	Events
1	1972	Riga	Soviet Union	10
2	1974	Madrid	Spain	10
3	1976	Leningrad	Soviet Union	10
4	1982	Varna	Bulgaria	10
5	1984	Bilbao	Spain	10
6	1986	Leningrad	Soviet Union	10
7	1987	Sofia	Bulgaria	10
8	1989	Herne Bay	England	10
9	1990	Tel Aviv	Israel	10
10	1991	Turin	Italy	10
11	1992	Kyiv/Moscow	Ukraine/Russia	29
12	1993	Kaliningrad	Russia	10
13	1994	Rzhev/Panevėžys	Russia/Lithuania	20
14	1995	Minsk	Belarus	18
15	1996	Aranđelovac	Yugoslavia	18
16	1997	Panevėžys/Baku	Lithuania/Azerbaijan	18
17	1998	Šiauliai	Lithuania	18
18	1999	Sofia	Bulgaria	18
19	2000	Madrid	Spain	18
20	2001	Albena	Bulgaria	27
21	2002	Cuneo	Italy	27
22	2003	Albena	Bulgaria	27
23	2004	Šiauliai	Lithuania	27
24	2005	Moscow	Russia	27
25	2006	Belgrade	Serbia and Montenegro	27

Edition	Year	Host City	Country	Events
26	2007	Pravets	Bulgaria	27
27	2008	Tbilisi	Georgia	27
28	2009	Milan	Italy	27
29	2010	Minsk	Belarus	27
30	2011	Sofia	Bulgaria	27
31	2012	Moscow	Russia	27
32	2013	Crema	Italy	27
33	2014	Bucharest	Romania	27
34	2015	Zagreb	Croatia	27
35	2016	Kazan	Russia	27
36	2017	Minsk	Belarus	27
37	2018	Athens	Greece	27
38	2019	Gijón	Spain	27
39	2020	Yekaterinburg	Russia	27
40	2021	Limassol	Cyprus	27
41	2022	Novi Sad	Serbia	27
42	2023	Haifa	Israel	27
43	2024	Novi Sad	Serbia	
44	2025	Limassol	Cyprus	
45	2026	Tbilisi	Georgia	

== All-time medal table (1972 - 2025) (Not Combat Sambo) ==
Rank	Nation	Gold	Silver	Bronze	Total
1	Russia	280	0	0	280
2	Belarus	89	0	0	89
3	Soviet Union	84	0	0	84
4	Ukraine	63	0	0	63
5	Bulgaria	54	0	0	54
6	Georgia	46	0	0	46
7	Azerbaijan	21	0	0	21
8	Armenia	18	0	0	18
9	Moldova	11	0	0	11
10	France	5	0	0	5
10	Lithuania	5	0	0	5
10	Romania	5	0	0	5
13	Spain	4	0	0	4
14	Israel	2	0	0	2
14	Japan	2	0	0	2
14	Netherlands	2	0	0	2
17	Czech Republic	1	0	0	1
17	Great Britain	1	0	0	1
17	Italy	1	0	0	1
17	Latvia	1	0	0	1
17	TAT	1	0	0	1
Totals (21 entries)		696	0	0	696

== Juniors ==
Competitions and events of the 2022 year

Championship among juniors U 20 Moscow Russia 1992

== 1992 European Juniors Sambo Championships U 20 (Moscow, Russia) ==
The European Juniors Sambo Championships (U20) 1992 June 4-7 Moscow Russia under the auspices of the International Sambo Federation (FIAS). Athletes from six countries participated. The chief referee was I. I. Tishchenkov.

Only partial results have been preserved. A separate fight for the bronze medal was held between athletes who took 3rd and 4th places in each weight category.

Medalists of the 1992 European Junior Sambo Championships (Moscow)
Weight	Gold	Silver	Bronze	4th place
57 kg	(Russia) Stepan Eliazyan	(Bulgaria) Nikolay Vrachov	(Lithuania) Dmitrij Divincukov	(Spain) Gorka Sagastume
62 kg	(Russia) Mukhamed Kunizhev	(Spain) Jose Anton Andrinal	(Lithuania) Remigijus Ežerskis	(Bulgaria) Stefan Stoyanov
82 kg	(Bulgaria) Ivaylo Dinkov	(Russia) Igor Kurinnoi	(Spain) Ricardo Echarte	(Lithuania) Aivars Jurgilas
90 kg	(Russia) Vasily Zotov	(Bulgaria) Ivaylo Kuzmanov	—	—
100 kg	(Russia) Andrey Polyakov	(Lithuania) Diritis Žalkauskis	—	—
+100 kg	(Russia) Vadim Volkov	—	—	—

=== Youth ===
Since 2005 the European Sambo Championships among adults and the Youth and Junior European Sambo Championships have been traditionally organised.

1. 2005
2. 2006
3. 2007
4. 2008
5. 2009
6. April 15—19, 2010 European Championship among youth and juniors Greece, Thessaloniki
7. April 14—18, 2011 European Championship among youth and juniors Czech Republic, Prague
8. April 05—09, 2012 Youth and Juniors European championships Romania, Bucharest
9. April 11—15, 2013 Youth (M&W) and Juniors (M&W) European championships Cyprus, Limassol
10. April 10—14, 2014 Youth (M&W) and Juniors (M&W) European championships Spain, Caceres
11. April 16—20, 2015 Youth (M&W) and Juniors (M&W) European championships Serbia, Novi Sad
12. April 07—11, 2016 European championships among Youth (M&W) and Juniors (M&W) France, Toulouse
13. April 18—22, 2017 European Sambo Championship among Youth and Juniors Czech Republic, Prague
14. April 12—16, 2018 European Sambo Championship among Youth and Juniors Czech Republic, Prague
15. April 11—15, 2019 European Sambo Championship among Youth and Juniors Cyprus, Limassol
16. May 24—30, 2021 European Sambo Championship among Adults, Youth and Juniors Cyprus, Limassol

=== Cadets ===
In 2012 the European SAMBO championship among cadets (15-16 years, boys and girls) was organised for the first time in Tallinn.

1. September 21—24, 2012 European Championship among cadets (15-16 years old) Estonia, Tallinn
2. September 13—16, 2013 European Championship among cadets (M&W 15-16 years old) Latvia, Riga
3. December 04—07, 2015 European Championship among Cadets (M&W 15-16 years old) Turkey, Istambul
4. 2016
5. December 01—04, 2017 European Sambo Championship among Cadets Croatia, Poric
6. 2018
7. December 06—09, 2019 European Sambo Championship among Cadets Latvia, Riga
8. December 17—20, 2021 European Championship among Cadetes (Juniors (M&F) 14-16) Cyprus, Limassol
9. December 02—05 2022 European Championship among Cadetes (Juniors (M&F) 14-16) Moldova, Kishinev

== Results ==
- Чемпионат Мира | ВнутриСамбо
- About | International SAMBO Federation (FIAS)
- Sambo History - International Sambo Federation (FIAS)
- Sambo History
- FIAS - History of Sambo Videos
- FIAS - President
- FIAS - Competition Results
- FIAS - Documents
- Calendar | International SAMBO Federation (FIAS)
- Соревнования | ВнутриСамбо
- Юниоры | ВнутриСамбо
- Федерация Самбо Украины
- Федерация Самбо Украины - ІІІ чемпионат мира (1979)
- Федерация Самбо Украины - XX чемпионат мира (1996)
- Федерация Самбо Украины - VIII чемпионат мира (1984)
- Федерация Самбо Украины
- CISM signs MoU with International Sambo Federation
- Southeast Asian SAMBO Championships Were Held In Indonesia | International SAMBO Federation (FIAS)
- Competitions and events of the 2022 year
- XXXVIII World Sports Sambo (M&W) and Combat Sambo Championships
- Европейская федерация самбо
- European sambo federation
- Wayback Machine
- Wayback Machine
- HISTORY OF SAMBO
- Federations | International SAMBO Federation (FIAS)
- Logo unveiled for 2019 World Sambo Championships

== See also ==
- World Sambo Championships
