= Francisco Morales Vivas =

Argentine Olympic judoka (born 1971)

Personal information
- Born: August 31, 1971 (age 54)
Medal record
Men's Judo
Representing Argentina
Pan American Games
Gold medal – first place	1991 Havana	Featherweight
Silver medal – second place	1995 Mar del Plata	Featherweight

Francisco Morales Vivas (born August 31, 1971) is a retired male judoka from Argentina. He claimed the gold medal in the Men's Featherweight (– 65 kg) division at the 1991 Pan American Games in Havana, Cuba. Morales represented his native country in two consecutive Summer Olympics, starting in 1992.
