= Jorge Steffano =

Uruguayan judoka

Personal information
- Nationality: Uruguayan
- Born: 11 March 1969 (age 57)

Sport
- Sport: Judo

Jorge Steffano (born 11 March 1969) is a Uruguayan judoka. He competed at the 1992 Summer Olympics and the 1996 Summer Olympics.
