= Chalid Arrab =

German kickboxer and mixed martial arts fighter

- Born: May 28, 1975 (age 51); Cologne, West Germany
- Other names: "Die Faust" (The Fist)
- Nationality: German; Moroccan
- Height: 1.79 m (5 ft 10 in)
- Weight: 97 kg (214 lb; 15 st 4 lb)
- Division: Heavyweight
- Style: MMA; Kickboxing, boxing
- Fighting out of: Breda, Netherlands
- Team: Golden Glory
- Trainer: Cor Hemmers
- Years active: 2002–2010 (kickboxing); 2000–2005 (MMA)

Kickboxing record
- Total: 42
- Wins: 34
- By knockout: 27
- Losses: 8
- By knockout: 3

Mixed martial arts record
- Total: 10
- Wins: 7
- By knockout: 3
- By submission: 1
- By decision: 3
- Losses: 3
- By submission: 2
- By decision: 1

Amateur boxing record
- Total: 37
- Wins: 34
- By knockout: 31
- Losses: 3

Other information
- Occupation: Businessman
- Website: https://web.archive.org/web/20070403102631/http://www.chalid-the-fist.com/
- Mixed martial arts record from Sherdog
- Last updated on: October 8, 2010

Chalid "Die Faust" Arrab (born May 28, 1975) is a German-Moroccan former kickboxer and mixed martial artist. He trained at Team Golden Glory in Breda under Cor Hemmers.

== Biography and career ==
Arrab's amateur boxing record of 34 wins and 31 KOs out of 37 bouts has earned him the nickname "Die Faust" ("The Fist" in German). On April 29, 2006 Arrab entered the K-1 World GP 2006 in Las Vegas as a heavy underdog. Just one week before the fight he was involved in a serious car crash in Germany. Arrab walked away unharmed.

In the quarterfinals Arrab took on a former wrestler, Sean O'Haire. Arrab stepped in quickly, firing with a series of uppercuts and knocking out the American in the first round.

In the semifinals he met Carter Williams. Midway through the second round, Williams dropped Arrab with a right knee. Arrab ended up losing the fight with a split decision. Under K-1's substitution rule, Williams could not continue due to a broken nose and shin injury suffered in his fight with Arrab. The fortunate German was sent back in to face Gary Goodridge in the GP tournament final.

In the first round, Goodridge threw a quick left hook to score an early knockdown. Heading into the third round, Die Faust was trailing badly on all cards due to the two downs. The only thing that could possibly win it for Arrab was a KO. Midway through the third round, he caught Goodridge with a right hook to the jaw and dropped him. "The Fist" capped his comeback in dramatic fashion and became the K-1 World GP 2006 USA Champion.

On September 30, 2006 at K-1 World Grand Prix 2006 final eliminations at Osaka, Japan, Arrab earned a unanimous decision win over Japanese fighter Musashi and qualified for his first ever appearance at the K-1 World Grand Prix 2006 Finals.

On December 2, 2006 at the K-1 World GP quarterfinals Arrab met four-time K-1 World Champion Ernesto Hoost. After the original three rounds, the judges ruled a draw and an additional round was added. Arrab lost that extra round by unanimous decision.

Arrab was scheduled to fight on August 11 in Las Vegas, against Mighty Mo. However, Arrab was unable to secure a visa in time, and was replaced by Stefan "Blitz" Leko.

== Titles ==
- 2006 K-1 World Grand Prix in Las Vegas Champion

== Kickboxing ==
Kickboxing record
34 wins (27 (T)KOs, 7 decisions), 8 losses
Date	Result	Opponent	Event	Location	Method	Round	Time
2010-10-02	Loss	(Bosnia and Herzegovina) Dževad Poturak	K-1 World Grand Prix 2010 in Seoul Final 16	Seoul, South Korea	TKO (corner stoppage)	3	0:06
2008-09-27	Loss	(Russia) Ruslan Karaev	K-1 World GP 2008 Final 16	Seoul, South Korea	TKO (referee stoppage)	2	2:30
2008-04-13	Loss	(Russia) Alexander Pitchkounov	K-1 World Grand Prix 2008 in Yokohama	Yokohama, Japan	2 ext. R. decision (split)	5	3:00
2007-09-29	Loss	(Brazil) Glaube Feitosa	K-1 World GP 2007 in Seoul Final 16	Seoul, South Korea	Decision (unanimous)	3	3:00
2006-12-02	Loss	(Netherlands) Ernesto Hoost	K-1 World Grand Prix 2006	Tokyo, Japan	Ext. R. decision (unanimous)	4	3:00
2006-09-30	Win	(Japan) Musashi	K-1 World Grand Prix 2006 in Osaka opening round	Osaka, Japan	Decision (split)	3	3:00
2006-04-29	Win	(Trinidad and Tobago) Gary Goodridge	K-1 World Grand Prix 2006 in Las Vegas	Las Vegas, Nevada, United States	KO (right hook)	3	1:00
Wins K-1 World Grand Prix 2006 in Las Vegas tournament title.
2006-04-29	Loss	(United States) Carter Williams	K-1 World Grand Prix 2006 in Las Vegas	Las Vegas, Nevada, United States	Decision (split)	3	3:00
Arrab replaced Williams due to injury.
2006-04-29	Win	(United States) Sean O'Haire	K-1 World Grand Prix 2006 in Las Vegas	Las Vegas, Nevada, United States	KO (right uppercut)	1	0:23
2005-11-05	Win	(Japan) Hiromitsu Kanehara	Hero's 2005 in Seoul	Seoul, South Korea	Decision (majority)	2	3:00
2005-08-13	Loss	(United States) Scott Lighty	K-1 World Grand Prix 2005 in Las Vegas II	Las Vegas, Nevada	Decision (unanimous)	3	3:00
2005-08-13	Win	(Japan) Hiraku Hori	K-1 World Grand Prix 2005 in Las Vegas II	Las Vegas, Nevada, United States	Decision (unanimous)	3	3:00
2005-03-26	Win	(Japan) Yukiya Naito	K-1 Hero's 1	Saitama, Japan	Decision (unanimous)	2	3:00
2003-06-14	Loss	(France) Cyril Abidi	K-1 World Grand Prix 2003 in Paris	Paris, France	KO (right hook)	2	1:32
2003-06-14	Win	(England) Pele Reid	K-1 World Grand Prix 2003 in Paris	Paris, France	Decision (unanimous)	3	3:00
2002-06-02	Win	(Japan) Ryushi Yanagisawa	K-1 Survival 2002	Toyama, Japan	TKO (doctor stoppage)	3	3:00
Legend: Win Loss Draw/no contest Notes

== Mixed martial arts record ==
Professional record breakdown
10 matches	7 wins	3 losses
By knockout	3	0
By submission	1	2
By decision	3	1

Res.	Record	Opponent	Method	Event	Date	Round	Time	Location	Notes
Win	7–3	Hiromitsu Kanehara	Decision (majority)	Hero's 2005 in Seoul	November 5, 2005	2	5:00	Seoul, South Korea	
Win	6–3	Yukiya Naito	Decision (unanimous)	Hero's 1	March 26, 2005	2	5:00	Saitama, Saitama, Japan	
Loss	5–3	Kazuhiro Nakamura	Submission (armbar)	PRIDE Bushido 3	May 23, 2004	1	4:45	Yokohama, Japan	
Win	5–2	Rodney Glunder	Decision (unanimous)	PRIDE Bushido 1	October 5, 2003	2	5:00	Saitama, Saitama, Japan	
Loss	4–2	Jeremy Horn	Decision (unanimous)	2H2H 6 - Simply the Best 6	March 16, 2003	1	15:00	Rotterdam, Netherlands	
Win	4–1	Stanislav Nuschik	KO (punches)	M-1 MFC - European Championship 2002	February 15, 2002	1	3:46	Saint Petersburg, Russia	
Win	3–1	Roman Zentsov	KO	M-1 MFC - Russia vs. the World 2	November 11, 2001		0:53	Saint Petersburg, Russia	
Win	2–1	Peter Varga	Submission (arm lock)	MillenniumSports - Veni Vidi Vici	April 22, 2001			Veenendaal, Netherlands	
Loss	1–1	Ramazan Mezhidov	Submission (rear naked choke)	IAFC - Pankration World Championship 2000	April 29, 2000	1		Moscow, Russia	
Win	1–0	Spartak Kochnev	TKO (strikes)	IAFC - Pankration World Championship 2000	April 29, 2000	1		Moscow, Russia	

== See also ==
- List of K-1 events
- List of K-1 champions
- List of male kickboxers
