= 2000 in M-1 Global =

Mixed martial arts events

Information
- First date: April 9, 2000
- Last date: November 11, 2000

Events
- Total events: 3

Fights
- Total fights: 35

Chronology
1999 in M-1	2000 in M-1 Global	2001 in M-1

The year 2000 is the fourth year in the history of M-1 Global, a mixed martial arts promotion based in Russia. In 2000 M-1 Global held 3 events beginning with, M-1 MFC: European Championship 2000.

== Events list ==
#	Event title	Date	Arena	Location
8	M-1 MFC: World Championship 2000	November 11, 2000	Yubileyny Sports Palace	Saint Petersburg, Russia
7	M-1 MFC: CIS Cup 2000 Final	September 11, 2000		Sochi, Russia
6	M-1 MFC: European Championship 2000	April 9, 2000	Yubileyny Sports Palace	Saint Petersburg, Russia

== M-1 MFC: European Championship 2000 ==
M-1 MFC: European Championship 2000 was an event held on April 9, 2000 at The Palace of Sport Jubileiny in Saint Petersburg, Russia.

=== Results ===
Main Card
Weight class				Method	Round	Time	Notes
	Todd Medina	def.	Martin Malkhasyan	TKO (Punches)	1	5:46
	Andrei Arlovski	def.	Roman Zentsov	TKO (Punches)	1	1:18
	Stanislav Nuschik	def.	Darrell Gholar	TKO (Punches)	1	6:39
	Andrei Semenov	def.	Ilya Kudryashov	Submission (Armbar)	1	4:18
	Timur Magdiev	def.	Mark Smith	Submission (Exhaustion)	1	7:40
	Andrei Arlovski	def.	Michael Tielrooy	Submission (Guillotine Choke)	1	1:25
	Roman Zentsov	def.	Gennadiy Matsigora	Submission (Guillotine Choke)	1	1:56
	Patrick de Witte	def.	Sergei Akinin	TKO (Punches)	1	2:05
	Darrell Gholar	def.	Amar Suloev	Decision (Unanimous)	2	10:00
	Stanislav Nuschik	def.	Tjerk Vermanen	Submission (Punches)	1	2:19
	Ilya Kudryashov	def.	Jhitry Shapipov	Submission (Guillotine Choke)	1	0:39
	Andrei Semenov	def.	Rafles la Rose	Submission (Armbar)	1	5:12
	Sergey Agopyan	def.	Ino Jino	Submission (Shoulder Lock)	1	3:34

== M-1 MFC: CIS Cup 2000 Final ==
M-1 MFC: CIS Cup 2000 Final was an event held on September 11, 2000 in Sochi, Russia.

=== Results ===
Main Card
Weight class				Method	Round	Time	Notes
	Martin Malkhasyan	def.	Stanislav Nuschik	Draw	3	5:00
	Andrei Semenov	def.	Nikolai Onikienko	Submission (Armlock)	1	0:00
	Sergei Bytchkov	def.	Vladimir Nikitin	Decision	0	15:00

== M-1 MFC: World Championship 2000 ==
M-1 MFC: World Championship 2000 was an event held on November 11, 2000 at The Palace of Sport Jubileiny in Saint Petersburg, Russia.

=== Results ===
Main Card
Weight class				Method	Round	Time	Notes
	Martin Malkhasyan	def.	Sergey Kaznovsky	Submission (Armbar)	0	0:00
	Andrei Semenov	def.	Alexei Veselovzorov	Submission (Armbar)	0	0:00
	Pedro Otavio	def.	Colin Sexton	TKO (Strikes)	0	0:00
	Martin Malkhasyan	def.	Oleg Tsygolnik	Submission (Choke)	0	0:00
	Andrei Semenov	def.	Nikolai Onikienko	Submission (Armbar)	0	0:00
	Amar Suloev	def.	Vahan Bojukyan	Submission (Choke)	0	0:00
	Colin Sexton	def.	Larry Parker	KO	0	0:00
	Pedro Otavio	def.	Timur Magdiev	N/A	0	0:00
	Oleg Tsygolnik	def.	Simon Barnett	TKO (Strikes)	0	0:00
	Martin Malkhasyan	def.	Patrick de Witte	Submission (Triangle Choke)	0	0:00
	Nikolai Onikienko	def.	Alexandr Sokov	Submission (Choke)	0	0:00
	Andrei Semenov	def.	Adnan Durmus	TKO (Strikes)	0	0:00
	Amar Suloev	def.	Rick Rootlieb	Submission (Choke)	0	0:00
	Vahan Bojukyan	def.	Carl Simpson	Submission (Arm Lock)	0	0:00
	Roman Zentsov	def.	Herman van Tol	KO	0	0:00
	Alexei Veselovzorov	def.	Sergey Agopyan	KO	0	0:00
	Artur Giloyan	def.	Arslan Amatov	Submission (Rear Naked Choke)	0	0:00
	Sergey Kaznovsky	def.	Anton Krilov	TKO	0	0:00
	Ilya Kudryashov	def.	Daan Kooiman	Submission (Triangle Choke)	0	0:00

== See also ==
- M-1 Global
