= Andrei Semenov (fighter) =

Russian mixed martial arts fighter

- Born: Andrei Vladimirovich Semenov; June 17, 1977 (age 49); Kineshma, Russian SFSR, Soviet Union
- Other names: White Shark, Wipe That
- Nationality: Russian
- Height: 6 ft 0 in (183 cm)
- Weight: 185 lb (84 kg; 13 st 3 lb)
- Division: Middleweight
- Style: Sambo, Vale tudo, freestyle wrestling, boxing
- Fighting out of: Stary Oskol, Belgorod, Russia
- Team: Red Devil Sport Club
- Years active: 1998-2008, 2011-2013

Mixed martial arts record
- Total: 46
- Wins: 35
- By knockout: 12
- By submission: 15
- By decision: 8
- Losses: 9
- By knockout: 2
- By submission: 1
- By decision: 6
- Draws: 2

Other information
- Notable students: Alexander Yakovlev
- Mixed martial arts record from Sherdog

Andrei Vladimirovich Semenov (Russian: Андрей Владимирович Семенов, also sometimes transliterated as Andrei Semyonov; born June 17, 1977) is a Russian mixed martial artist and Sambo practitioner. He has also made forays into acting.

Semenov has fought within the UFC middleweight division, in M-1 events and Pride Bushido, with an overall MMA record of 34 wins, 9 losses and 2 draws. He has been fighting in Mixed Martial Arts since 1998, and is famed for excellent throws, strong submission defense, superior stamina and being very resilient and hard to finish.

== Mixed martial arts career ==
=== M-1 Global ===
Three years after retiring in 2008, Semenov returned to MMA and fought Luigi Fioravanti at M-1 Challenge: 25 on April 28, 2011. Though a considerable underdog on media scoring websites, Semenov won the fight via unanimous decision. After another hiatus, Semenov returned on December 8, 2012, facing Michele Verginelli at M-1 Challenge: 36. He won via unanimous decision.

Semenov fought on October 20, 2013, defeating Gregor Herb at M-1 Challenge 42. He was then scheduled to face Ramazan Emeev at M-1 Challenge 47 on April 4, 2014, however in the weeks leading up to the event, the bout was cancelled for unknown reasons.

=== Ultimate Fighting Championship ===
With a 20-2 record, Semenov made his UFC debut on January 11, 2002, against notable BJJ black-belt Ricardo Almeida at UFC 35. Semenov won via TKO (punches).

He returned four months later on May 10, 2002, facing Ivan Salaverry at UFC 37. Semenov lost via TKO, and following the fight, Semenov left the UFC and returned to the M-1 Global promotion.

== Championships and accomplishments ==
Mixed Martial Arts

- M-1 Global
  - Champion M-1 Global - Middleweight GP

== Mixed martial arts record ==
Professional record breakdown
45 matches	34 wins	9 losses
By knockout	11	2
By submission	15	1
By decision	8	6
Draws	2	

Res.	Record	Opponent	Method	Event	Date	Round	Time	Location	Notes
Win	34–9–2	Gregor Herb	Decision (unanimous)	M-1 Challenge: 42	October 20, 2013	3	5:00	St. Petersburg, Russia	
Win	33–9–2	Michele Verginelli	Decision (unanimous)	M-1 Challenge: 36	December 8, 2012	3	5:00	Mytishchi, Russia	
Win	32–9–2	Luigi Fioravanti	Decision (unanimous)	M-1 Challenge 25: Zavurov vs. Enomoto	April 28, 2011	3	5:00	Saint Petersburg, Russia	
Win	31–9–2	Gregory Babene	Decision (split)	IAFC: Russia vs. the World	November 29, 2008	3	5:00	Novosibirsk, Russia	
Win	30–9–2	Lubomir Guedjev	TKO (strikes)	fightFORCE: Russia vs. The World	April 19, 2008	2	2:06	St. Petersburg, Russia	
Win	29–9–2	Emyr Bussade	Decision (unanimous)	BodogFIGHT - USA vs. Russia	November 30, 2007	3	5:00	Moscow, Russia	
Loss	28–9–2	Jorge Santiago	TKO (strikes)	Bodog Fight - Clash of the Nations	April 14, 2007	2	4:48	St. Petersburg, Russia	
Win	28–8–2	Matt Ewin	TKO (strikes)	Bodog Fight - Costa Rica	February 16, 2007	1	0:43	Costa Rica	
Loss	27–8–2	Trevor Prangley	Decision (unanimous)	Bodog Fight - USA vs Russia	December 2, 2006	3	5:00	Vancouver, British Columbia, Canada	
Loss	27–7–2	Gregory Bouchelaghem	Decision	M-1 MFC: Russia vs. France	November 3, 2005	3	5:00	St. Petersburg, Russia	
Loss	27–6–2	Denis Kang	Decision (unanimous)	Pride: Bushido 8	July 17, 2005	2	5:00	Nagoya, Japan	
Win	27–5–2	Matt Ewin	Decision	M-1 MFC: Heavyweight GP	December 4, 2004	3	5:00	Moscow, Russia	
Win	26–5–2	Flavio Luiz Moura	Decision	M-1 MFC: Middleweight GP	October 9, 2004	3	5:00	St. Petersburg, Russia	
Win	25–5–2	Azred Telkusheev	Submission (rear-naked choke)	M-1 MFC: Middleweight GP	October 9, 2004	1	1:25	St. Petersburg, Russia	
Win	24–5–2	Martin Kampmann	TKO (doctor stoppage)	M-1 MFC: Middleweight GP	October 9, 2004	1	1:21	St. Petersburg, Russia	
Loss	23–5–2	Trevor Prangley	Decision (unanimous)	Euphoria - Russia vs USA	March 13, 2004	3	5:00	Atlantic City, New Jersey, United States	
Draw	23–4–2	Denis Kang	Draw	M-1 MFC - Russia vs. The World 7	December 5, 2003	1	10:00	St. Petersburg, Russia	
Win	23–4–1	Chris Albandia	TKO (cut)	M-1 MFC - Russia vs. the World 6	October 10, 2003	1	0:50	Moscow, Russia	
Draw	22–4–1	Mike Pyle	Draw	M-1 MFC - Russia vs. the World 5	April 6, 2003	1	10:00	St. Petersburg, Russia	
Win	22–4	Curtis Stout	Submission (rear naked choke)	M-1 MFC - Russia vs. the World 4	November 15, 2002	1	2:57	St. Petersburg, Russia	
Loss	21–4	Murad Chunkaiev	Decision	2H2H 5 - Simply the Best 5	October 13, 2002	2	3:00	Rotterdam, Netherlands	
Loss	21–3	Ivan Salaverry	TKO (punches)	UFC 37	May 10, 2002	3	2:27	Bossier City, Louisiana, United States	
Win	21–2	Ricardo Almeida	TKO (punches)	UFC 35	January 11, 2002	2	2:01	Uncasville, Connecticut, United States	
Win	20–2	Renato Vieira	TKO (punches)	M-1 MFC - Russia vs. the World 2	November 11, 2001	1	1:01	St. Petersburg, Russia	
Win	19–2	Dave Dalgliesh	Submission (armbar)	2H2H 3 - Hotter Than Hot	October 7, 2001	1	2:32	Rotterdam, Netherlands	
Win	18–2	Tulio Palhares	Submission (armbar)	M-1 MFC - Russia vs. the World 1	April 27, 2001	2	2:16	St. Petersburg, Russia	
Win	17–2	Martijn de Jong	TKO (strikes)	MillenniumSports: Veni Vidi Vici	April 22, 2001	N/A	N/A	Veenendaal, Netherlands	
Win	16–2	Alexei Vezelozorov	Submission (armbar)	M-1 MFC - World Championship 2000	November 11, 2000	N/A	N/A	St. Petersburg, Russia	
Win	15–2	Nikolai Onikienko	Submission (armbar)	M-1 MFC - World Championship 2000	November 11, 2000	N/A	N/A	St. Petersburg, Russia	
Win	14–2	Adnan Durmus	TKO (strikes)	M-1 MFC - World Championship 2000	November 11, 2000	N/A	N/A	St. Petersburg, Russia	
Win	13–2	Nikolai Onikienko	Submission (armlock)	M-1 MFC - CIS Cup 2000 Final	September 11, 2000	1	N/A	Sochi, Russia	
Win	12–2	Martijn de Jong	Submission (guillotine choke)	BOA 2 - Battle of Arnhem 2	September 3, 2000	N/A	N/A	Arnhem, Netherlands	
Loss	11–2	Amar Suloev	Submission (rear naked choke)	WVC 11 - World Vale Tudo Championship 11	May 27, 2000	1	1:47	Recife, Brazil	
Win	11–1	Phil Ensminger	TKO (strikes)	WVC 11 - World Vale Tudo Championship 11	May 27, 2000	1	8:51	Recife, Brazil	
Win	10–1	Fabricio Madeirada	TKO (strikes)	WVC 11 - World Vale Tudo Championship 11	May 27, 2000	1	3:48	Recife, Brazil	
Loss	9–1	Andrei Rudakov	Decision	IAFC - Pankration World Championship 2000 Day 2	April 29, 2000	1	N/A	Moscow, Russia	
Win	9–0	Daur Dyakaev	Submission (rear-naked choke)	IAFC - Pankration World Championship 2000 Day 1	April 28, 2000	1	0:57	Moscow, Russia	
Win	8–0	Ilya Kudryashov	Submission (armbar)	M-1 MFC - European Championship 2000	April 9, 2000	1	4:18	St. Petersburg, Russia	
Win	7–0	Rafles la Rose	Submission (armbar)	M-1 MFC - European Championship 2000	April 9, 2000	1	5:12	St. Petersburg, Russia	
Win	6–0	Göksel Sahinbas	TKO (punches)	2H2H 1 - 2 Hot 2 Handle	March 5, 2000	1	3:28	Rotterdam, Netherlands	
Win	5–0	Sergei Zavadsky	Submission (armbar)	M-1 MFC - Russia Open Tournament	December 5, 1999	1	0:57	St. Petersburg, Russia	
Win	4–0	Sergei Gur	Submission (armbar)	M-1 MFC - Russia Open Tournament	December 5, 1999	1	1:17	St. Petersburg, Russia	
Win	3–0	Darrel Gholar	Decision	M-1 MFC - World Championship 1999	April 9, 1999	3	10:00	St. Petersburg, Russia	
Win	2–0	Amar Suloev	Submission (armbar)	M-1 MFC - World Championship 1999	April 9, 1999	1	6:08	St. Petersburg, Russia	
Win	1–0	Ruslan Yacoupov	Submission (armbar)	M-1 MFC - World Championship 1998	February 14, 1998	2	1:48	St. Petersburg, Russia	

== Filmography ==
Among the films in which he has acted is the 2004 Russian film Dark Night (Темная ночь).
