= Piet van Gammeren =

Dutch MMA fighter

- Born: Netherlands
- Nationality: Dutch
- Division: Heavyweight
- Team: Loek's Gym
- Years active: 1997 - 2002

Mixed martial arts record
- Total: 15
- Wins: 7
- By knockout: 1
- By submission: 1
- By decision: 3
- Unknown: 2
- Losses: 7
- By knockout: 6
- Unknown: 1
- Draws: 1

Other information
- Mixed martial arts record from Sherdog

Piet van Gammeren is a Dutch mixed martial artist. He competed in the Heavyweight division.

== Mixed martial arts record ==
Professional record breakdown
15 matches	7 wins	7 losses
By knockout	1	6
By submission	1	0
By decision	3	0
Unknown	2	1
Draws	1	

Res.	Record	Opponent	Method	Event	Date	Round	Time	Location	Notes
Loss	7–7–1	Michailis Deligiannakis	TKO	FFG: Fight Night	July 14, 2002	2	0:00	Crete, Greece	
Loss	7–6–1	Paul Cahoon	KO (punch)	2H2H 3: Hotter Than Hot	October 7, 2001	1	1:24	Rotterdam, South Holland, Netherlands	
Loss	7–5–1	Edmunds Kirsis	Disqualification	BOA 3: Battle of Arnhem 3	September 23, 2001	1	0:00	Arnhem, Gelderland, Netherlands	
Win	7–4–1	Herman Renting	Decision (unanimous)	Rings Holland: Heroes Live Forever	January 28, 2001	2	5:00	Utrecht, Netherlands	
Win	6–4–1	Peter Verschuren	Decision (unanimous)	Rings Holland: The Kings of the Magic Ring	June 20, 1999	3	3:00	Utrecht, Netherlands	
Loss	5–4–1	Can Sahinbas	TKO (cut)	IMA: Back to the Roots	April 24, 1999	0	0:00	Hoofddorp, North Holland, Netherlands	
Loss	5–3–1	Michael Tielrooy	KO	IMA: Mix Fight Gala	January 31, 1999	0	0:00	Landsmeer, North Holland, Netherlands	
Draw	5–2–1	Stef Stricker	Draw	FFH: Free Fight Gala	January 9, 1999	0	0:00	Beverwijk, North Holland, Netherlands	
Loss	5–2	Dave van der Veen	TKO (cut)	Rings Holland: The Thialf Explosion	October 24, 1998	0	0:00	Heerenveen, Friesland, Netherlands	
Win	5–1	Ferry van de Wal	Decision (1-0 points)	IMA: KO Power Tournament	April 12, 1998	1	10:00	Amsterdam, North Holland, Netherlands	
Loss	4–1	Danielius Razmus	TKO (submission to strikes)	M-1 MFC: European Championship 1998	April 10, 1998	1	0:00	Saint Petersburg, Russia	
Win	4–0	Sergei Akinin	Submission (smother)	M-1 MFC: European Championship 1998	April 10, 1998	1	0:00	Saint Petersburg, Russia	
Win	3–0	Jerry Kalia	TKO (knee injury)	Rings Holland: The King of Rings	February 8, 1998	2	0:19	North Holland, Netherlands	
Win	2–0	Gerard Benschop	N/A	FFH: Free Fight Gala	December 21, 1997	0	0:00	Beverwijk, North Holland, Netherlands	
Win	1–0	Broede van Deutekom	N/A	Gym Alkmaar: Fight Gala	October 5, 1997	0	0:00	Bergen, North Holland, Netherlands	

== See also ==
- List of male mixed martial artists
