= 1998 in M-1 Global =

Mixed martial arts events

Information
- First date: February 14, 1998
- Last date: April 10, 1998

Events
- Total events: 2

Fights
- Total fights: 20

Chronology
1997 in M-1	1998 in M-1 Global	1999 in M-1

The year 1998 is the second year in the history of M-1 Global, a mixed martial arts promotion based in Russia. In 1998 M-1 Global held 2 events beginning with, M-1 MFC: World Championship 1998.

== Events list ==
#	Event Title	Date	Arena	Location
3	M-1 MFC: European Championship 1998	April 10, 1998		Saint Petersburg, Russia
2	M-1 MFC: World Championship 1998	February 14, 1998		Saint Petersburg, Russia

== M-1 MFC: World Championship 1998 ==
M-1 MFC: World Championship 1998 was an event held on February 14, 1998, in Saint Petersburg, Russia.

=== Results ===
Main Card
Weight class				Method	Round	Time	Notes
	Alexei Sitnikov	def.	Dennis Deryabkin	Decision	3	10:00
	Ruslan Kerselyan	def.	Eric Hill	TKO	1	4:16
	Andrei Semenov	def.	Ruslan Yacoupov	Submission (Armbar)	2	1:48
	Dennis Deryabkin	def.	Rick Rootlieb	KO	1	9:45
	Rodney Glunder	def.	Sergei Zavadsky	TKO	1	0:00
	Jeffrey van 't Schip	def.	Roman Golana	Decision	1	10:00
	Valentin Golubovskij	def.	Goksel Sahinbas	Submission (Arm Lock)	1	2:00
	Alexei Sitnikov	def.	Tjerk Vermanen	KO	1	8:07
	Rick Rootlieb	def.	Vyacheslav Kiselev	TKO	1	1:40
	Dennis Deryabkin	def.	Vidal Serradilla	TKO	1	9:15

== M-1 MFC: European Championship 1998 ==
M-1 MFC: European Championship 1998 was an event held on April 10, 1998, in Saint Petersburg, Russia.

=== Results ===
Main Card
Weight class				Method	Round	Time	Notes
	Ruslan Kerselyan	def.	Sander Thonhauser	TKO	1	0:00
	Danielius Razmus	def.	Piet van Gammeren	Submission (Strikes)	1	0:00
	Dennis Deryabkin	def.	Vidal Serradilla	KO	1	0:00
	Sergei Bytchkov	def.	Sergei Zavadsky	TKO (Leg Injury)	1	0:00
	Piet van Gammeren	def.	Sergei Akinin	Submission (Smother)	1	0:00
	Danielius Razmus	def.	Oleg Tsygolnik	DQ (Headbutt)	1	0:00
	Vidal Serradilla	def.	Garik Mamiev	Submission (Rear Naked Choke)	1	0:55
	Dennis Deryabkin	def.	Richardus Baika	KO	1	0:00
	Sergei Bytchkov	def.	Goksel Sahinbas	Decision (1-0 Points)	1	0:00
	Sergei Zavadsky	def.	Roberto Schernius	Submission (Forearm Choke)	1	0:00

== See also ==
- M-1 Global
