= Rick Rootlieb =

Dutch mixed martial artist

- Born: Netherlands
- Nationality: Dutch
- Team: Loek's Gym, Alkmaar
- Years active: 1998–2000

Mixed martial arts record
- Total: 9
- Wins: 3
- By knockout: 2
- By submission: 1
- Losses: 6
- By knockout: 2
- By submission: 4

Other information
- Mixed martial arts record from Sherdog

Rick Rootlieb is a Dutch mixed martial artist.

== Mixed martial arts record ==
Professional record breakdown
9 matches	3 wins	6 losses
By knockout	2	2
By submission	1	4

Res.	Record	Opponent	Method	Event	Date	Round	Time	Location	Notes
Loss	3–6	Patrick de Witte	KO (head kick)	It's Showtime: Christmas Edition	December 12, 2000	1	0:06	Haarlem, North Holland, Netherlands	
Loss	3–5	Amar Suloev	Submission (choke)	M-1 MFC: World Championship 2000	November 11, 2000	0	0:00	Saint Petersburg, Russia	
Loss	3–4	Fred van Doesburg	Submission (smother)	Rings Holland: Di Capo Di Tutti Capi	June 4, 2000	1	4:18	Utrecht, Netherlands	
Loss	3–3	Richard Plug	Submission (smother)	Rings Holland: The Kings of the Magic Ring	June 20, 1999	2	2:22	Utrecht, Netherlands	
Loss	3–2	Artur Mariano	Submission	Gym Alkmaar: Fight Gala	April 3, 1999	0	0:00	Schermerhorn, North Holland, Netherlands	
Win	3–1	Adrian Wild	Submission (kneebar)	Rings Holland: Judgement Day	February 7, 1999	1	1:55	Amsterdam, North Holland, Netherlands	
Win	2–1	Johan Woudstra	KO	Rings Holland: The Thialf Explosion	October 24, 1998	0	0:00	Heerenveen	
Loss	1–1	Dennis Deryabkin	KO	M-1 MFC: World Championship 1998	February 14, 1998	1	9:45	Saint Petersburg, Russia	
Win	1–0	Vyacheslav Kiselev	TKO	M-1 MFC: World Championship 1998	February 14, 1998	1	1:40	Saint Petersburg, Russia	

== See also ==
- List of male mixed martial artists
