= 1999 in M-1 Global =

Mixed martial arts events

Information
- First date: April 9, 1999
- Last date: December 5, 1999

Events
- Total events: 2

Fights
- Total fights: 23

Chronology
1998 in M-1	1999 in M-1 Global	2000 in M-1

The year 1999 was the third year in the history of M-1 Global, a mixed martial arts promotion based in Russia. In 1999 M-1 Global held 2 events beginning with, M-1 MFC: World Championship 1999.

== Events list ==
#	Event title	Date	Arena	Location
5	M-1 MFC: Russia Open Tournament	December 5, 1999		Saint Petersburg, Russia
4	M-1 MFC: World Championship 1999	April 9, 1999		Saint Petersburg, Russia

== M-1 MFC: World Championship 1999 ==
M-1 MFC: World Championship 1999 was an event held on April 9, 1999, in Saint Petersburg, Russia.

=== Results ===
Main Card
Weight class				Method	Round	Time	Notes
	Martin Malkhasyan	def.	Alexei Sitnikov	Submission (Rear Naked Choke)	1	5:19
	Martin Malkhasyan	def.	Viacheslav Datsik	Submission (Rear Naked Choke)	1	0:58
	Alexei Sitnikov	def.	Ruslan Kerselyan	TKO (Punches)	1	4:10
	Marco Holkamp	def.	Sergei Zavadsky	Submission (Guillotine Choke)	1	0:38
	Andrei Semenov	def.	Darrell Gholar	Decision	3	10:00
	Viacheslav Datsik	def.	Andrei Arlovski	KO (Punch)	1	6:05
	Martin Malkhasyan	def.	André Tete	TKO (Punches)	1	0:34
	Ruslan Kerselyan	def.	Michael Tielrooy	Submission (Achilles Lock)	1	0:42
	Alexei Sitnikov	def.	Vidal Serradilla	Submission (Punches)	1	1:28
	Marco Holkamp	def.	Alexey Donchin	KO (Kick)	1	1:18
	Sergei Zavadsky	def.	Goksel Sahinbas	TKO (Punches)	1	9:01
	Darrell Gholar	def.	Stanislav Nuschik	Submission (Slam)	2	8:14
	Andrei Semenov	def.	Amar Suloev	Submission (Armbar)	1	6:08
	Arslan Amatov	def.	Radion Voropaev	TKO (Strikes)	1	1:58

== M-1 MFC: Russia Open Tournament ==
M-1 MFC: Russia Open Tournament was an event held on December 5, 1999, in Saint Petersburg, Russia.

=== Results ===
Main Card
Weight class				Method	Round	Time	Notes
	Vadim Kuvatov	def.	Viacheslav Datsik	TKO (Punches)	1	0:00
	Andrei Semenov	def.	Sergei Zavadsky	Submission (Armbar)	1	0:57
	Eugeney Lyamin	def.	Alexei Kuksa	Submission (Rear-Naked Choke)	1	0:00
	Alexei Sitnikov	def.	Sergey Kaznovsky	KO (Punch)	1	0:00
	Vadim Kuvatov	def.	Dmitriy Ushatsky	Submission (Rear-Naked Choke)	1	0:00
	Viacheslav Datsik	def.	Stanislav Nuschik	Submission (Heel Hook)	1	0:00
	Sergei Zavadsky	def.	Sergei Bytchkov	Submission (Rear-Naked Choke)	1	0:00
	Andrei Semenov	def.	Sergei Gur	Submission (Armbar)	1	1:17
	Sergey Agopyan	def.	Yaroslav Pilnik	Submission (Armbar)	1	0:00

== See also ==
- M-1 Global
