= Amar Suloev =

Armenian mixed martial arts fighter

- Born: January 7, 1976; Tashir, Armenian SFSR, USSR
- Died: June 27, 2016 (aged 40); Anapa, Russia
- Nationality: Yazidi Kurdish
- Citizenship: Armenia; Russia
- Height: 5 ft 9 in (175 cm)
- Weight: 185 lb (84 kg; 13 st 3 lb)
- Division: Light Heavyweight; Middleweight
- Style: Wrestling, Kickboxing, Judo, Sambo, Muay Thai, Jiu-Jitsu, Boxing
- Stance: Orthodox
- Fighting out of: Anapa, Russia
- Team: Red Devil Sport Club
- Years active: 1999–2008

Mixed martial arts record
- Total: 33
- Wins: 25
- By knockout: 14
- By submission: 8
- By decision: 3
- Losses: 8
- By knockout: 2
- By submission: 4
- By decision: 2

Other information
- Mixed martial arts record from Sherdog

Amar Suloev (January 7, 1976 – June 27, 2016) was an Armenian mixed martial artist. Following his mixed martial arts career, Suloev allegedly became involved in the world of organized crime and was arrested and accused of being a contract killer. He died of stomach cancer in June 2016. During his career, he fought for the UFC, PRIDE Fighting Championships, Cage Rage, and M-1 Global.

Suloev made the first recorded use of the submission hold that became known as the Suloev Stretch in a 2002 victory over Paul Cahoon. The hold, a kneebar variant applied from the back control position, was subsequently used effectively by MMA fighters including Kenny Robertson, Aljamain Sterling and Zabit Magomedsharipov. It has also been used by grappler Josh Cisneros.

== Background ==
Suloev was born into a Kurdish Yazidi family in Tashir, Armenian Soviet Socialist Republic (now Armenia).

== Mixed martial arts career ==
A former kickboxer and Greco-Roman wrestler, Suloev was recruited by the Russian team Red Devil Sport Club and made his debut in national promotion M-1 Global in 1999, losing to Andrei Semenov by armbar. Suloev later avenged his defeat by choking out Semenov in Brazil for World Vale Tudo Championship, winning the WVC 11 Middleweight Tournament in the process.

=== Ultimate Fighting Championship ===
At UFC 35, Suloev came to fight in the premier MMA organization of the United States where he faced top light heavyweight Chuck Liddell. The fight went to decision, where Liddell was awarded the win on points. The fight was intense and Suloev demonstrated his level of skill with kickboxing as he avoided the trademark power shots of the feared American fighter. Despite the loss, Amar was one of only seven fighters to take Liddell to decision. The UFC invited him back at UFC 37 to fight Phil Baroni, where a controversial knee by Suloev was landed while Baroni was on his knees getting up, shortly after the referee stood them up, Baroni landed a flurry of punches which stopped Suloev.

=== PRIDE Fighting Championships ===
After a brief stint in the UFC, Suloev returned to M-1 Global for a few fights before jumping to the top Japanese MMA promotion Pride Fighting Championships. His first fight in Pride came against top Brazilian Jiu Jitsu ace Dean Lister, which ended in a decision win for Amar. His next fight came against another highly regarded jiu jitsu fighter Paulo Filho, however, in this fight, despite some aggression and relative success in striking on the feet, Filho proved to be the far better grappler, as he got a submission victory. Top Brazilian Top Team fighter, Murilo Bustamante faced Suloev in his next Pride appearance, and on this occasion, Suloev was able to largely keep the fight standing, where his strong kickboxing background guided him to a victory. In his final Pride fight, Denis Kang was his opponent, and much like the fight against Filho, Suloev was unsuccessful in avoiding the submission once the fight reached the canvas.

== Criminal allegations ==
After concluding his MMA career, Suloev reportedly went to work for a private security company named VAN. The company was connected to Sergei Zirinov, a businessman, Krasnodar Krai legislative assemblyman, and member of president Vladimir Putin's United Russia Party. Suloev was said to have acted as Zirinov's security guard, and carried out assignments on his behalf.

According to the subsequent charges, Zirinov directed a group of six to nine men, including Suloev, who between them carried out four murders and a further attempted murder in cities on Russia's Black Sea coast, which arose out of extortion attempts by Zirinov. Suloev reportedly joined the gang in 2012, after the first three murders, but according to prosecutors was involved in the fourth, and an attempted murder that took place at the same time.

The first two murder victims were Vitaly Sadovnichy, the director of a sanatorium resort in the city of Anapa, and his wife, Olga Ivankina. According to the indictment, both were killed at a meeting with Zirinov on 24 March 2002 by two of his associates. Sadovnichy was shot twice in the back, while his wife was first strangled then shot in the head. There is no allegation that Suloev was involved. Sadovnichy had complained before his death that he had received threats from Zirinov, but an official investigation at the time had failed to confirm the allegation.

Businessman Salman Nabiyev was shot twice in the back in the courtyard of his home off Karl Marx Street in Novorossiysk on 17 December 2004. Nabiyev was reported to have been involved in a commercial dispute with a "dangerous" family unrelated to Zirinov or the other accused men. Again, there is no suggestion that Suloev was involved.

On 22 February 2013, Nikolai Nesterenko, a businessman, community leader, and candidate for political office, was shot at from a "considerable distance" while getting into his car in Anapa. Nesterenko was wounded in the torso and arm but survived, while his driver was killed on the spot. Shortly after the failed assassination, arrests of suspects begun. In the course of the investigation, two of those arrested confessed to involvement in multiple murders, including a former special forces operative named Dmitry Sapozhnikov, who said he pulled the trigger in each of the shootings. Sapozhnikov implicated Suloev as the driver in the Nesterenko hit.

Suloev himself was arrested on 26 March 2013 in a Yessentuki sanatorium. Subsequent testimony from Suloev's wife indicated that the arresting FSB officers stole, used, and damaged Suloev's Audi A6 sports car and an expensive watch, before returning both items five months later, while almost 130,000 rubles was withdrawn from his bank account and vanished without trace.

Both the prosecution's case and the conduct of the trial was criticised in the Russian press. The criticisms included reference to evidence of torture against "a number" of defendants, including burns resulting from electric shocks on the body of one of the defendants, a 60-year-old man. Defendants were also reportedly denied sufficient access to their lawyers. Nesterenko's testimony before the court was reportedly vague and insubstantial, and Nesterenko himself had previously been the subject of extortion allegations.

There were reportedly problems with the state's case against Suloev. One killer testified that Suloev had been the get away driver for the Nesterenko hit. But Suloev did not match eyewitness descriptions of the driver. Furthermore, his neighbor testified to meeting him on the morning of the attempt at his house at 9:05 am. The attempt occurred at about 9am hundreds of kilometers away.

At the time of Suloev's death, his trial had been suspended and he had been released on bail following his stage four stomach cancer diagnosis.

== Championships and accomplishments ==
- M-1 Global
  - 2000 M-1 MFC World Championship Tournament Winner
- 2 Hot 2 Handle
  - 2H2H 3: Hotter Than Hot Tournament Winner
- World Vale Tudo Championship
  - WVC 11 Middleweight Tournament Winner

== Mixed martial arts record ==
Professional record breakdown
32 matches	25 wins	7 losses
By knockout	14	2
By submission	8	3
By decision	3	2

Res.	Record	Opponent	Method	Event	Date	Round	Time	Location	Notes
Win	24–7	Jacek Buczko	TKO (kick and punches)	M-1 Challenge 2: Russia	April 3, 2008	1	0:56	St. Petersburg, Russia	
Loss	23–7	Chael Sonnen	TKO (punches)	BodogFIGHT: Alvarez vs. Lee	July 14, 2007	2	3:33	Trenton, New Jersey, United States	
Win	23–6	Andy Foster	KO (punches)	BodogFIGHT: Clash of the Nations	April 14, 2007	1	0:26	St. Petersburg, Russia	
Win	22–6	Hun Kim	TKO (punches)	M-1 MFC: Russia vs. Korea	January 20, 2007	1	4:35	St. Petersburg, Russia	
Loss	21–6	Denis Kang	Submission (one-arm strangle)	PRIDE Bushido 12	August 26, 2006	1	4:10	Nagoya, Japan	
Win	21–5	Murilo Bustamante	Decision (unanimous)	PRIDE Bushido 11	June 4, 2006	2	5:00	Saitama, Japan	
Win	20–5	James Nicholl	TKO (doctor stoppage)	Cage Rage 16	April 22, 2006	1	5:00	London, United Kingdom	
Win	19–5	Damien Riccio	KO (knee)	M-1 MFC: Russia vs. France	November 3, 2005	1	1:25	St. Petersburg, Russia	
Loss	18–5	Paulo Filho	Submission (armbar)	PRIDE: Bushido 6	April 3, 2005	1	4:22	Yokohama, Japan	
Win	18–4	Dean Lister	Decision (split)	PRIDE Bushido 4	July 19, 2004	2	5:00	Nagoya, Japan	
Win	17–4	Din Thomas	TKO (punches and soccer kicks)	Inoki Bom-Ba-Ye 2003	December 31, 2003	1	4:22	Kobe, Japan	
Win	16–4	Yushin Okami	TKO (punches)	M-1 MFC: Russia vs. the World 6	October 10, 2003	1	4:44	St. Petersburg, Russia	
Win	15–4	Julian Gonzales	Submission (rear-naked choke)	M-1 MFC: Russia vs. the World 4	November 15, 2002	1	1:38	St. Petersburg, Russia	
Win	14–4	Paul Cahoon	Submission (Suloev stretch)	2H2H 5: Simply the Best	October 13, 2002	1	1:03	Rotterdam, Netherlands	
Loss	13–4	Phil Baroni	TKO (punches)	UFC 37	May 10, 2002	1	2:55	Bossier City, Louisiana, United States	
Loss	13–3	Chuck Liddell	Decision (unanimous)	UFC 35	January 11, 2002	3	5:00	Uncasville, Connecticut, United States	Light Heavyweight bout.
Win	13–2	Moise Rimbon	TKO (punches)	2H2H 3: Hotter Than Hot	October 7, 2001	2	4:48	Rotterdam, Netherlands	Won 2H2H 3: Hotter Than Hot Tournament.
Win	12–2	Paul Cahoon	Decision (2–0 points)	2H2H 3: Hotter Than Hot	October 7, 2001	2	5:00	Rotterdam, Netherlands	2H2H 3: Hotter Than Hot Tournament Semifinals.
Win	11–2	Patrick de Witte	Submission (armbar)	2H2H 3: Hotter Than Hot	October 7, 2001	1	1:11	Rotterdam, Netherlands	2H2H 3: Hotter Than Hot Tournament Quarterfinals.
Win	10–2	Pedro Otavio	KO (punches)	M-1 MFC: Russia vs. the World 1	April 27, 2001	1	3:40	St. Petersburg, Russia	
Win	9–2	Valentin Siouljine	TKO (injury)	Pancration Cup of Russia 1	December 1, 2000	1	4:52	St. Petersburg, Russia	
Win	8–2	Alexander Mayorov	TKO (strikes)	PCR: Pancration Cup of Russia 1	December 1, 2000	1	1:31	St. Petersburg, Russia	
Win	7–2	Vagam Bodjukyan	Submission (choke)	M-1 MFC: World Championship 2000	November 11, 2000	2	2:51	St. Petersburg, Russia	Won M-1 MFC World Championship Tournament.
Win	6–2	Rick Rootlieb	Submission (choke)	M-1 MFC: World Championship 2000	November 11, 2000	3	0:31	St. Petersburg, Russia	M-1 MFC World Championship Tournament Semifinals.
Win	5–2	Andrei Semenov	Submission (rear-naked choke)	World Vale Tudo Championship 11	May 27, 2000	1	1:47	Recife, Brazil	Won WVC 11 Middleweight Tournament.
Win	4–2	Alberto Prima	Submission (kicks)	World Vale Tudo Championship 11	May 27, 2000	1	1:25	Recife, Brazil	WVC 11 Middleweight Tournament Semifinals.
Win	3–2	Luis Alberto	KO (kick)	WVC 11: World Vale Tudo Championship 11	May 27, 2000	1	2:26	Recife, Brazil	WVC 11 Middleweight Tournament Quarterfinals.
Win	2–2	Erik Oganov	Submission (armbar)	Pankration World Championship 2000 Day 1	April 28, 2000	1	0:21	Moscow, Russia	
Loss	1–2	Darrel Gholar	Decision	PCNC: Pancration Cup of North Caucasus	April 9, 2000	2	10:00	St. Petersburg, Russia	
Win	1–1	Sergei Yankovski	Decision	PCNC: Pancration Cup of North Caucasus	March 5, 2000	2	10:00	Rostov, Russia	
Loss	0–1	Andrei Semenov	Submission (armbar)	M-1 MFC: World Championship 1999	April 9, 1999	1	6:08	St. Petersburg, Russia	1999 M-1 MFC Middleweight Tournament Semifinals.
