= Red Devil Sport Club =

Mixed martial arts academy in St. Petersburg, Russia

- Est.: 1997; 29 years ago
- Founded by: Vadim Finkelstein
- Primary trainers: Aleksander Vasilievich Michkov, Vladimir Mikhaylovich Voronov, Yuri Razumov
- Past titleholders: Alexander Volkov heavyweight champion (Bellator - vacated) +232.2 lb (105.3 kg); Fedor Emelianenko heavyweight champion (PRIDE FC - defunct) +204.6 lb (92.8 kg) heavyweight Grand Prix winner (PRIDE FC 2004) +204.6 lb (92.8 kg); Gegard Mousasi middleweight champion (DREAM FC 2008, vacated) 185 lb (84 kg) light-heavyweight champion (Strikeforce 2009, defunct) 205 lb (93 kg)
- Prominent fighters: Alexander Volkov; Fedor Emelianenko; Aleksander Emelianenko; Alexey Oleinik; Gegard Mousasi; Amar Suloev; Andrei Semenov
- Training facilities: St. Petersburg, Russia

The Red Devil Sport Club is a mixed martial arts academy in St. Petersburg, Russia, founded by Vadim Finkelstein. In 2011, it was renamed to Alexander Nevsky OEMK.

== History ==
The team's main fighter base is made up of Russian Sambo fighters who have adapted their style to mixed martial arts, and they regularly compete in full contact combat sambo tournaments. Initially, Red Devil fighters were primarily stars of Finkelstien's MMA promotion M-1 Global such as Ibragim Magomedov, Roman Zentsov, Amar Suloev, and Arman Gambaryan. Throughout the history of M-1 global, Red Devil has competed in team events, and have proven consistently to be among Russia's best MMA teams.

Since 2005 the team's most notable fighters are the brothers Fedor and Aleksander Emelianenko. The Emelianenko brothers left Russian Top Team due to claims of management abuse, and since that time the primary trainers for Red Devil have been the Emelianenkos' childhood coaches Vladimir Voronov, and Aleksander Michkov. The membership and popularity of the team has increased since Fedor and Aleksander joined as well, primarily drawing from the ranks of Russia's Combat Sambo competitors. Former champions such as Mikhail Zayats, Victor Nemkov, Aleksander Garkushenko, among others have been drawn to the club since the success of the Emelianenkos.

Because of Fedor's previous association with the Russian Top Team, the two MMA associations maintained a cohabitant rivalry, until Russian Top Team was largely dissolved following the death of former manager Vladimir Pogonin, as well as the retirement of the team's former featured coach and fighter Volk Han.

In 2009 Aleksander Emelianenko officially left the Red Devil for unexplained reasons, however he currently continues to train with his brothers Fedor, and Ivan, along with longtime coach Vladimir Voronin, Aleksander Michkov, and family friend Kirill Sidelnikov in Stary Oskol, Russia.

The team competed in the 2008 M-1 Challenge championship (M-1 Challenge # 1) and won it. In 2009 it performed much worse failing to win its group in the M-1 Challenge 2009, where it appeared under the name Imperial Team. This is thought to be largely due to the frequency in which Red Devil enters some of its most inexperienced members into the M-1 challenge events. The team also chose the name 'Imperial Team' as its current feature fighter Fedor Emelianenko has reservations over the name 'Red Devil', and due to spiritual reasons prefers the name Imperial Team.

== Notable associated fighters ==
- Alexander Volkov - UFC
- Alexey Oleinik - UFC
- Andrei Semenov - M-1 Global
- Amar Suloev - M-1 Global
- Fedor Emelianenko - Bellator
- Gegard Mousasi - Bellator
- Victor Nemkov - M-1 Global
- Mikhail Zayats - Bellator
- Sergey Golyaev - M-1 Global

== See also ==
- List of Top Professional MMA Training Camps
