= Rumen Dimitrov =

Bulgarian sambist and mixed martial artist

- Born: Rumen Mitkov Dimitrov; May 10, 1982 (age 44); Sofia, Bulgaria
- Native name: Румен Димитров
- Height: 5 ft 9 in (1.75 m)
- Weight: 170 lb (77 kg; 12 st)
- Division: Middleweight; Welterweight
- Team: TWINS MMA
- Years active: 2007–2012

Mixed martial arts record
- Total: 16
- Wins: 13
- By knockout: 6
- By submission: 5
- By decision: 2
- Losses: 0
- Draws: 2
- No contests: 1

Other information
- Notable relatives: Rosen Dimitrov (brother)
- Mixed martial arts record from Sherdog
- Last updated on: May 31, 2011

Rumen Dimitrov (Bulgarian: Румен Димитров; born May 10, 1982) is a retired Bulgarian Sambo practitioner and mixed martial artist who has won gold and two bronze medals at the Combat Sambo World Championships.

== Sambo career ==
Part of the Dimitrov family which has produced significant success in Combat Sambo for Bulgaria, Rumen has medaled two consecutive years in the middleweight category for Combat Sambo. When he was a child he weighed around 100 kilograms, but his coach Gele, who taught him sambo and judo, made him the professional he is today.

== Mixed martial arts career ==
Competing primarily in Bulgaria, Dimitrov has proven himself, much like his brother Rosen Dimitrov. He is the former MAX FIGHT middleweight champion, which is a Bulgarian promotion.

== Mixed martial arts record ==
Professional record breakdown
16 matches	13 wins	0 losses
By knockout	6	0
By submission	5	0
By decision	2	0
Draws	2	
No contests	1	

Res.	Record	Opponent	Method	Event	Date	Round	Time	Location	Notes
NC	13–0–2 (1)	Ronny Alexander Landaeta Utrera	No Contest	MAXFIGHT 28	August 2, 2012	3	5:00	Sveti Vlas, Bulgaria	
Win	13–0–2	Nikolay Krastev	Submission (kimura)	ММА MAXFIGHT-27	June 16, 2012	1	2:14	Sofia, Bulgaria	
Win	12–0–2	Mikel Cortes	TKO (punches)	ММА MAXFIGHT-21	May 27, 2011	1	2:39	Sofia, Bulgaria	
Win	11–0–2	Shonie Carter	TKO (punches)	ММА MAXFIGHT-19	March 10, 2011	2	2:48	Sofia, Bulgaria	
Win	10–0–2	Ivan Ivanov	TKO (punches)	BMMAF - Warriors 18	December 17, 2010	1	3:17	Sofia, Bulgaria	
Win	9–0–2	Nikolai Alexiev	Decision (unanimous)	ММА MAXFIGHT-16	August 2, 2010	2	5:00	Sveti Vlas, Bulgaria	
Win	8–0–2	Ignas Petkus	Submission (rear-naked choke)	Real Pain Challenge: Domination	April 10, 2010	1	N/A	Sofia, Bulgaria	
Win	7–0–2	Ivan Simic	Submission (guillotine choke)	BMMAF - Warriors 9	August 2, 2009	1	0:53	Sveti Vlas, Bulgaria	
Win	6–0–2	Hristo Shirev	TKO (punches)	WFC 7 Gudejev vs. Carvalho	April 4, 2009	2	3:34	Sofia, Bulgaria	
Draw	5–0–2	Bastien Huveneers	Draw	BMMAF Warriors 5	September 28, 2008	2	5:00	Sofia, Bulgaria	
Win	5–0–1	Michele Verginelli	Decision (split)	Real Pain Challenge 2	May 17, 2008	3	5:00	Sofia, Bulgaria	
Win	4–0–1	Hristo Shirev	TKO (punches)	Real Pain Challenge 1	March 9, 2008	2	3:36	Sofia, Bulgaria	
Win	3–0–1	Marko Djukic	Submission (armbar)	BCM MMA Open Sofia	December 21, 2007	2	1:47	Sofia, Bulgaria	
Win	2–0–1	Vladimir Shumanov	KO	Shooto - Bulgaria	October 6, 2007	1	1:43	Sofia, Bulgaria	
Draw	1–0–1	Stoyan Dimitar	Draw	Shooto - Bulgaria	May 12, 2007	2	5:00	Sofia, Bulgaria	
Win	1–0–0	Ricardo Tannus	Submission	Ichigeki - Bulgaria	May 5, 2007	1	1:45	Sofia, Bulgaria	MMA Debut
