= Lubomir Guedjev =

Bulgarian MMA manager and former fighter

- Born: Lubomir Guedjev; 1978-01-11; Plovdiv, Bulgaria
- Nationality: (Bulgaria) Bulgarian
- Weight: 185lb (84kg)
- Style: Brazilian Ju-Jitsu, Submission Wrestling
- Team: Real Pain
- Years active: 2007–present

Mixed martial arts record
- Total: 24
- Wins: 13
- By submission: 10
- By decision: 3
- Losses: 11
- By knockout: 4
- By submission: 2
- By decision: 5

Other information
- Occupation: Business owner
- University: Bachelors in Business Administration – Arden University
- Website: www.lubomirguedjev.com www.guedjevbjj.com www.fightscout.app

Lubomir Roumenov Guedjev (born 11 January 1978) is a Bulgarian former MMA fighter, coach, event organizer, manager, and advisor who spent over 20 years in the United Arab Emirates and specialized in the combat sports industry. Currently, he works as an entrepreneur with two companies to his name. He has organized over 400 brazilian jiu-jitsu and Grappling tournaments on 4 continents.

== Early life and education ==
Guedjev was born in Plovdiv, Bulgaria. He completed his Bachelor of Business Administration from Arden University.

== Career ==
Guedjev is a former MMA fighter who competed in MMA, BJJ, Grappling, Muay Thai, and KUDO where he held a Title Belt in WFC promotion. He is also an instructor who produced champions in the field. He guides sportsmen towards achieving their goals, or the goals of the organization. He was the head referee of the ADCC Grappling Tournament, the most prestigious grappling event in the world, where he refereed the greatest fights between 1999 and 2005.

=== Entrepreneurship ===
Guedjev established the first MMA and BJJ Federations in Bulgaria, and organized the first professional MMA event in Bulgaria in 2007 in Plovdiv, under Shooto Federation. He was the one to pioneer the MMA and BJJ in Bulgaria.

He returned to Bulgaria in 2021 and founded two companies, Fight Scout App, a mobile app for combat sports, and Geo Wash Bulgaria, the first mobile ecological car wash in Bulgaria.

Fight Scout is a social networking app that enables users to discover and connect with other members of the combat sports community. Fight Scout facilitates users to connect with others in their vicinity or worldwide who share their interest in martial arts, boxing, and other combat sports.

=== Manager ===
Guedjev was selected to lead Abu Dhabi’s project initiative on incorporating the martial art of Jiu-Jitsu in all government schools as part of their educational curriculum, a mission directed by the Crown Prince of the Emirate. He was the technical manager for Palms Sports LLC in Abu Dhabi, leading a team of 400 professional instructors, and several team leaders and supervisors. He helped to create the training programs, assessment criteria, health and safety standards, and all other technical aspects of the project. He played a key role in organizing hundreds of competitions, demonstrations, exhibitions, and sports fairs.

=== Event manager ===
Guedjev organized and looked after many sporting events on four continents, taking part in all organizational elements. Initially, he served the duties from stage concepts, lights, sound, screenplay, building and managing the teams of people working on the event, to the brand’s marketing campaign, monetization strategies, network coverage, contracts on copyrights and distribution, content generation, and digital technology implementation. He also established and managed the Abu Dhabi Warriors MMA event, and organized over 400 BJJ and Grappling tournaments on 4 continents.

=== Consultant ===
Guedjev worked for the UAE Presidential Guards on their hand-to-hand combative training, where he managed a team of 60 instructors and designed the training programs, specific courses, and the standards for measuring performance. He also worked with organizations in China, Russia, India, and UAE where he offered a wide range of services in the field of building sports infrastructure and event management.

== Mixed martial arts record ==
As of December 2011, Sherdog lists Guedjev's professional record as 13 wins, 11 losses and one no contest.

Professional record breakdown
25 matches	13 wins	11 losses
By knockout	0	4
By submission	10	2
By decision	3	5
No contests	1	

Res.	Record	Opponent	Method	Event	Date	Round	Time	Location	Notes
Loss	13–11 (1)	Ivica Truscek	TKO (doctor stoppage)	WFC 15 - Olimp Sport Nutrition	18 December 2011	2	5:00	Ljubljana, Slovenia	
Loss	13–10 (1)	Gadji Zaipulaev	Decision (split)	FEFoMP - Cup of Vladivostok in Pankration	26 November 2011	3	5:00	Vladivostok, Russia	
Win	13–9 (1)	Arbi Agujev	Submission (armbar)	WFC 14 - Proteini.si Showtime	12 June 2011	1	2:53	Ljubljana, Slovenia	
Win	12–9 (1)	Aleksey Shapovalov	Submission (armbar)	FEFoMP - Open Championship of Vladivostok	28 May 2011	1	1:26	Vladivostok, Russia	
Win	11–9 (1)	Sofiane Benchohra	Submission (rear-naked choke)	RPC 10 - Rising Force	18 February 2011	1	1:51	Sofia, Bulgaria	
Loss	10–9 (1)	Nikos Sokolis	TKO (punches)	NL 10 - No Limits	27 February 2010	2	4:10	Attica, Greece	
Loss	10–8 (1)	Hoon Kim	Submission (triangle choke)	AOW 15 - Ueyama vs. Aohailin	28 November 2009	1	8:58	Beijing, China	
Loss	10–7 (1)	Rosen Dimitrov	Decision (unanimous)	Maxfight - Warriors 11	19 September 2009	3	5:00	Kardzhali, Bulgaria	
Loss	10–6 (1)	Dong Hyun Ma	TKO (doctor stoppage)	AOW 13 - Rising Force	18 July 2009	1	4:38	Beijing, China	
Loss	10–5 (1)	Bruno Carvalho	Decision (unanimous)	WFC 7 - Guedjev vs. Carvalho	4 April 2009	3	5:00	Sofia, Bulgaria	
Win	10–4 (1)	Jean-Francois Lenogue	Decision (unanimous)	WFC 6 - Relentless	27 September 2008	3	5:00	Sofia, Bulgaria	
Win	9–4 (1)	Christos Petroutsos	Decision (unanimous)	Maxfight - Warriors 3	7 June 2008	3		Bourgas, Bulgaria	
Win	8–4 (1)	Gokhan Yildizli	Submission (rear-naked choke)	RPC 2 - Real Pain Challenge 2	17 May 2008	1	2:45	Sofia, Bulgaria	
Loss	7–4 (1)	Andrei Semenov	TKO (punches)	fightFORCE - Russia vs. The World	19 April 2008	2	2:06	Leningrad, Russia	
Win	7–3 (1)	Michele Verginelli	Submission (guillotine choke)	WFC 4 - Dynamite	29 March 2008	1	3:44	Ljubljana, Slovenia	
Win	6–3 (1)	David Michelle	Decision (unanimous)	Maxfight - Warriors 1	23 February 2008	2	5:00	Bourgas, Bulgaria	
Loss	5–3 (1)	David Bielkheden	Decision (unanimous)	FF 9 - FinnFight 9	15 December 2007	2	5:00	Finland Proper, Finland	
Win	5–2 (1)	Miroslav Niagolov	Submission (triangle choke)	MMABG - MMA Bulgaria	19 October 2007	1		Veliko Tarnovo, Bulgaria	
Win	4–2 (1)	Dimitar Iliev	Submission (rear naked choke)	Shooto - Bulgaria	6 October 2007	1	4:35	Bulgaria	
Win	3–2 (1)	Nedelin Delchev	Submission (choke)	FF - Free Fights 2	15 September 2007	1		Haskovo, Bulgaria	
NC	2–2 (1)	Magno Almeida	No Contest	Ichigeki - Bulgaria	5 May 2007			Bulgaria	
Win	2–2	Yakub Yakubov	Submission (triangle choke)	Ichigeki - Bulgaria	25 March 2007	1		Bulgaria	
Loss	1–2	Fabricio Nascimento	Submission (armbar)	WFC 2 - Evolution	30 September 2006	1	3:25	Koper, Slovenia	
Win	1–1	Anastasios Vogiatzis	Submission (armbar)	AFC 15 - Absolute Fighting Championships 15	18 February 2006	1	0:18	Fort Lauderdale, Florida, United States	
Loss	0–1	Nic Osei	Decision	Shooto Sweden - Second Impact	12 March 2005	2	5:00	Stockholm, Sweden	
