= 2001 in M-1 Global =

Mixed martial arts events

Information
- First date: April 27, 2001
- Last date: December 27, 2001

Events
- Total events: 5

Fights
- Title fights: 60

Chronology
2000 in M-1	2001 in M-1 Global	2002 in M-1

The year 2001 is the fifth year in the history of M-1 Global, a mixed martial arts promotion based in Russia. In 2001 M-1 Global held 5 events beginning with, M-1 MFC: Russia vs. the World 1.

== Events list ==
#	Event title	Date	Arena	Location
13	M-1 MFC: Exclusive Fight Night 4	December 27, 2001	Arena Fighting Club	Saint Petersburg, Russia
12	M-1 MFC: Russia vs. the World 2	November 11, 2001		Saint Petersburg, Russia
11	M-1 MFC: Exclusive Fight Night 3	September 27, 2001		Saint Petersburg, Russia
10	M-1 MFC: Exclusive Fight Night 2	June 28, 2001		Saint Petersburg, Russia
9	M-1 MFC: Russia vs. the World 1	April 27, 2001	Yubileyny Sports Palace	Saint Petersburg, Russia

== M-1 MFC: Russia vs. the World 1 ==
M-1 MFC: Russia vs. the World 1 was an event held on April 27, 2001 at The Palace of sport "Jubileiny" in Saint Petersburg, Russia.

=== Results ===
Main Card
Weight class				Method	Round	Time	Notes
	Stanislav Nuschik	def.	Ian Freeman	KO (Punch)	1	0:20
	Tony Torres	def.	Nikolai Kudryashov	TKO (Retirement)	1	5:25
	Amar Suloev	def.	Pedro Otavio	KO (Punch)	1	3:40
	Viacheslav Datsik	def.	Patrick de Witte	Submission (Rear-Naked Choke)	1	0:30
	Alexei Sitnikov	def.	Gerhard Ettl	TKO (Punches)	1	3:40
	Sergey Kaznovsky	def.	Dave Vader	TKO (Punches)	1	1:44
	Andrei Semenov	def.	Tulio Palhares	Submission (Armbar)	2	2:16
	Dave Dalgliesh	def.	Nikolai Onikienko	TKO (Punches)	1	9:58
	Colin Sexton	def.	Dmitry Petrov	Submission (Guillotine Choke)	1	0:25
	Larry Parker	def.	Sergei Yankovski	DQ (Illegal Headbutt)	1	1:08
	Alexei Veselovzorov	def.	Antonio Resende	Submission (Guillotine Choke)	1	2:10
	Sergei Bytchkov	def.	Thomas Hengstberger	Submission (Armbar)	1	1:40
	Ronny Rivano	def.	Sergei Zavadsky	TKO (Punches)	1	7:30
	Ilya Kudryashov	def.	Ronny Hoekstra	Submission (Rear-Naked Choke)	1	0:20
	David Mclaughlin	def.	Andranik Ashugyan	Submission (Rear-Naked Choke)	1	1:11
	Vladimir Zenin	def.	Artur Giloyan	TKO (Retirement)	1	5:05

== M-1 MFC: Exclusive Fight Night 2 ==
M-1 MFC: Exclusive Fight Night 2 was an event held on June 28, 2001 in Saint Petersburg, Russia.

=== Results ===
Main Card
Weight class				Method	Round	Time	Notes
	Alexei Veselovzorov	def.	Andrey Karasev	Submission (Wrist Lock)	1	2:50
	Eugeney Lyamin	def.	Alexandr Sokov	Submission (Choke)	1	2:37
	Stanislav Ivanchenko	def.	Alexey Timashev	Submission (Choke)	1	6:15
	Arslan Amatov	def.	Vadim Melnikov	KO	1	2:24
	Alexandr Tsyganok	def.	Vladimir Egorov	TKO	1	2:00
	Mikhail Gilyaev	def.	Shamil Ismailov	Submission (Choke)	1	1:00
	Ivan Skorobogatov	def.	Alexandr Popov	Submission (Choke)	1	5:52
	Alexandr Popov	def.	Sergei Zavadsky	TKO	1	0:00
	Mikhail Sokolov	def.	Dmitry Drozhalkin	Submission (Choke)	1	5:35
	Sergey Golyaev	def.	Matvey Pereshivailo	Submission (Armbar)	1	2:10
	Rasim Kasumov	def.	Stanislav Ustinov	TKO	1	5:00

== M-1 MFC: Exclusive Fight Night 3 ==
M-1 MFC: Exclusive Fight Night 3 was an event held on September 27, 2001 in Saint Petersburg, Russia.

=== Results ===
Main Card
Weight class				Method	Round	Time	Notes
	Arman Gambaryan	def.	Alexei Veselovzorov	Submission (Rear-Naked Choke)	1	3:30
	Nikolai Korneli	def.	Alexandr Garkushenko	Submission (Rear-Naked Choke)	1	8:05
	Alexandr Sokov	def.	Stanislav Ivanchenko	TKO (Punches)	1	8:20
	Soslan Jalilov	vs.	Dmitry Shuvalov	Draw	2	4:00
	Alexandr Popov	def.	Ashot Konstandyan	TKO (Punches)	1	5:07
	Arsen Janbekov	def.	Vadim Melnikov	TKO (Foot Injury)	1	1:15
	Danila Veselov	def.	Ilya Kudryashov	TKO (Corner Stoppage)	1	10:00
	Mikhail Gilyaev	def.	Igor Vasilyev	Decision (Unanimous)	1	10:00
	Roman Bagirov	vs.	Eugeni Malafeev	Draw	2	3:00
	Sergey Golyaev	def.	Rasim Kasumov	Submission (Triangle Choke)	1	2:45

== M-1 MFC: Russia vs. the World 2 ==
M-1 MFC: Russia vs. the World 2 was an event held on November 11, 2001 in Saint Petersburg, Russia.

=== Results ===
Main Card
Weight class				Method	Round	Time	Notes
	Bob Schrijber	def.	Martin Malkhasyan	TKO (Punches)	1	8:40
	Gilbert Yvel	def.	Ibragim Magomedov	Submission (Rear-Naked Choke)	1	2:45
	Chalid Arrab	def.	Roman Zentsov	TKO (Punches)	1	0:53
	Oleg Tsygolnik	def.	Mika Ilmen	Submission (Knee Injury)	1	1:35
	Stanislav Nuschik	def.	Marcelo Vieira	TKO (Punches)	1	3:46
	Arman Gambaryan	def.	Armando Sixel	Submission (Rear-Naked Choke)	1	3:22
	Andrei Semenov	def.	Renato Vieira	TKO (Punches)	1	1:01
	Patrick de Witte	def.	Arslan Amatov	TKO (Doctor Stoppage)	1	2:29
	Yka Leino	def.	Nikolai Onikienko	Submission (Armbar)	1	2:10
	Alexei Veselovzorov	def.	Dave Dalgliesh	Submission (Rear-Naked Choke)	1	3:56
	Ronny Rivano	def.	Danila Veselov	TKO (Punches)	1	1:45
	Sergei Bytchkov	def.	Jani Lax	TKO (Punches)	1	3:00
	Ashot Konstandyan	def.	Tony Torres	TKO (Punches)	1	1:02
	Alexandr Sokov	def.	David Marcina	Submission (Rear-Naked Choke)	1	7:20

== M-1 MFC: Exclusive Fight Night 4 ==
M-1 MFC: Exclusive Fight Night 4 was an event held on December 27, 2001 at The Arena Fighting Club in Saint Petersburg, Russia.

=== Results ===
Main Card
Weight class				Method	Round	Time	Notes
	Stanislav Nuschik	def.	Alexandr Garkushenko	KO (Punches)	1	3:30
	Roman Zentsov	def.	Pashir Kumiev	TKO (Punches)	1	3:35
	Alexei Veselovzorov	def.	Eugeney Lyamin	Submission (Rear Naked Choke)	1	1:35
	Danila Veselov	def.	Sergei Zavadsky	TKO (Leg Injury)	1	4:45
	Ilya Kudryashov	def.	Igor Vasilyev	Decision (Unanimous)	1	10:00
	Sergei Prishutov	def.	Alexandr Kulikov	KO (Punches)	1	4:40
	Arut Mesokyan	def.	Emil Akhmedov	Submission (Rear-Naked Choke)	1	0:25
	Sergei Galstyan	def.	Sergei Pavlovsky	KO (Head Kick)	1	4:42
	Eugeni Malafeev	def.	Sergei Polovtsev	KO (Punches)	1	4:25

== See also ==
- M-1 Global
