= Herman van Tol =

Dutch mixed martial arts fighter

- Born: Netherlands
- Nationality: Dutch
- Division: Heavyweight
- Team: Loek's Gym
- Years active: 1997 - 2001

Mixed martial arts record
- Total: 10
- Wins: 4
- By knockout: 1
- By submission: 2
- By decision: 1
- Losses: 4
- By knockout: 4
- Draws: 1
- No contests: 1

Other information
- Mixed martial arts record from Sherdog

Herman van Tol is a Dutch mixed martial artist. He competed in the Heavyweight division.

== Mixed martial arts record ==
Professional record breakdown
10 matches	4 wins	4 losses
By knockout	1	4
By submission	2	0
By decision	1	0
Draws	1	
No contests	1	

Res.	Record	Opponent	Method	Event	Date	Round	Time	Location	Notes
Loss	4–4–1 (1)	Ed de Kruijf	TKO (punches)	It's Showtime: Original	21 October 2001	1	0:31	Haarlem, North Holland, Netherlands	
Win	4–3–1 (1)	Mikhail Avetisyan	Decision (2-1 points)	2H2H 3: Hotter Than Hot	7 October 2001	1	10:00	Rotterdam, South Holland, Netherlands	
Draw	3–3–1 (1)	Remco Pardoel	Draw	Rings Holland: No Guts, No Glory	10 June 2001	2	5:00	Amsterdam, North Holland, Netherlands	
Win	3–3 (1)	Sander MacKilljan	Submission (keylock)	Rings Holland: Heroes Live Forever	28 January 2001	1	2:08	Utrecht, Netherlands	
Loss	2–3 (1)	Roman Zentsov	KO	M-1 MFC: World Championship 2000	11 November 2000	0	0:00	Saint Petersburg, Russia	
Win	2–2 (1)	Can Sahinbas	Technical Submission (keylock)	It's Showtime: Exclusive	22 October 2000	1	4:04	Haarlem, North Holland, Netherlands	
Loss	1–2 (1)	Peter Verschuren	TKO (3 knockdowns)	IMA: Mix Fight Gala	31 January 1999	0	0:00	Landsmeer, North Holland, Netherlands	
Win	1–1 (1)	Glen Brown	KO	AAC 1: Amsterdam Absolute Championship 1	25 October 1998	1	1:52	Amsterdam, North Holland, Netherlands	
Loss	0–1 (1)	Joop Kasteel	KO (kick to the body)	Rings Holland: Who's The Boss	7 June 1998	2	0:58	Utrecht, Netherlands	
NC	0–0 (1)	Sander MacKilljan	No Contest	FFH: Free Fight Gala	21 December 1997	0	0:00	Beverwijk, North Holland, Netherlands	

== See also ==
- List of male mixed martial artists
