= 2002 in M-1 Global =

Mixed martial arts events

Information
- First date: February 15, 2002
- Last date: December 27, 2002

Events
- Total events: 3

Fights
- Total fights: 45

Chronology
2001 in M-1	2002 in M-1 Global	2003 in M-1

The year 2002 is the sixth year in the history of M-1 Global, a mixed martial arts promotion based in Russia. In 2002 M-1 Global held 3 events beginning with, M-1 MFC: European Championship 2002.

== Events list ==
#	Event title	Date	Arena	Location
16	M-1 MFC: Russia vs. the World 4	November 15, 2002	Palace of Sport	Saint Petersburg, Russia
15	M-1 MFC: Russia vs. the World 3	April 26, 2002		Saint Petersburg, Russia
14	M-1 MFC: European Championship 2002	February 15, 2002	Yubileyny Sports Palace	Saint Petersburg, Russia

== M-1 MFC: European Championship 2002 ==
M-1 MFC: European Championship 2002 was an event held on February 15, 2002 at The Palace of Sport "Jubileiny" in Saint Petersburg, Russia.

=== Results ===
Main Card
Weight class				Method	Round	Time	Notes
	Ibragim Magomedov	def.	Paul Cahoon	KO (Punches)	1	6:13
	Chalid Arrab	def.	Stanislav Nuschik	KO (Punches)	1	3:46
	Alexandr Garkushenko	def.	Patrick de Witte	Submission (Armlock)	1	1:51
	Fatih Kocamis	vs.	Arman Gambaryan	Draw	1	10:00
	Husein Cift	def.	Bashir Guliev	KO	1	6:32
	Arben Lafti	def.	Arslan Amatov	Submission (Rear Naked Choke)	1	3:46
	Eugeney Lyamin	def.	Brian Maulany	KO	1	0:52
	Alexei Veselovzorov	def.	Yka Leino	TKO (Strikes)	1	6:43
	Robert Sundel	def.	Stanislav Ivanchenko	Submission (Strikes)	1	3:43
	Harri Niva	def.	Arsen Janbekov	Submission (Rear Naked Choke)	1	1:47
	Sergei Bytchkov	def.	Sauli Heilimo	TKO (Strikes)	1	4:11
	Jani Lax	def.	Musail Alaudinov	Submission (Rear Naked Choke)	1	0:44
	Per Eklund	def.	Ilya Kudryashov	Decision (2-1 Split)	2	5:00
	Roman Bagirov	vs.	Raschid Agaragimov	Draw	1	10:00
	Sergei Kushnarenko	def.	Maxim Rudenski	Submission (Rear Naked Choke)	1	4:20

== M-1 MFC: Russia vs. the World 3 ==
M-1 MFC: Russia vs. the World 3 was an event held on April 26, 2002 in Saint Petersburg, Russia.

=== Results ===
Main Card
Weight class				Method	Round	Time	Notes
	Alistair Overeem	def.	Sergey Kaznovsky	Submission (Armbar)	1	3:37
	Luiz Firmino	def.	Sergei Bytchkov	TKO (Punches)	2	2:38
	Ibragim Magomedov	def.	Marcio Jeova	Submission (Rear-Naked Choke)	1	2:48
	Roman Zentsov	def.	Rafael Comes	TKO (Punches)	1	3:27
	Martin Malkhasyan	def.	Rodney Glunder	Submission (Kneebar)	1	3:34
	Arman Gambaryan	def.	Marcelo Vieira	Submission (Rear-Naked Choke)	1	5:30
	Alexandr Garkushenko	vs.	Daniel Tabera	Draw	2	5:00
	Mikko Rupponen	def.	Sergei Yankovski	DQ	1	4:07
	Alexei Veselovzorov	def.	Umer Sara	Submission (Rear-Naked Choke)	1	2:38
	Eugeney Lyamin	def.	Julian Gonzales	KO (Head Kick)	1	0:07
	Magomed Dzhabrailov	def.	Dave Dalgliesh	Submission (Rear-Naked Choke)	1	9:53
	Milton Vieira	def.	Islam Karimov	Submission (Rear-Naked Choke)	1	8:08
	Musail Alaudinov	def.	Ronny Rivano	Submission (Rear-Naked Choke)	1	0:58
	Bashir Guliev	def.	Anton Arkhipkin	TKO (Punches)	1	1:28
	Mikhail Bogdanov	def.	Sergei Nikitin	TKO (Punches)	1	0:13

== M-1 MFC: Russia vs. the World 4 ==
M-1 MFC: Russia vs. the World 4 was an event held on November 15, 2002 at The Palace of Sport in Saint Petersburg, Russia.

=== Results ===
Main Card
Weight class				Method	Round	Time	Notes
	Amar Suloev	def.	Julian Gonzales	Submission (Rear-Naked Choke)	1	1:38
	Andrei Semenov	def.	Curtis Stout	Submission (Rear-Naked Choke)	1	2:57
	Ibragim Magomedov	def.	Ben Rothwell	TKO (Retirement)	1	10:00
	Roman Zentsov	def.	Alessio Sakara	Decision (Unanimous)	2	5:00
	Martin Malkhasyan	def.	Erkka Shalstrom	Submission (Rear-Naked Choke)	1	0:51
	Daniel Tabera	def.	Alexandr Garkushenko	TKO (Punches)	1	9:50
	Yka Leino	def.	Alexei Veselovzorov	Submission (Rear-Naked Choke)	1	3:57
	Sergei Bytchkov	def.	Xavier Garcia	TKO (Punches)	1	6:30
	Goran Vidakovic	def.	Stanislav Ivanchenko	Submission (Guillotine Choke)	1	0:52
	Musail Alaudinov	def.	Kazeka Muniz	Decision (Unanimous)	2	5:00
	Islam Karimov	vs.	Dave Strasser	Draw	2	5:00
	Sergei Yankovski	def.	Denis Pokatilo	Submission (Guillotine Choke)	1	3:45
	Alseldar Abdulhamidov	def.	Bashir Guliev	Decision (Unanimous)	2	5:00
	Danila Veselov	vs.	Agop Topchyan	Draw	2	5:00
	Maxim Rudenski	def.	Artur Agly	Submission (Rear Naked Choke)	1	1:40

== See also ==
- M-1 Global
