= Roman Zentsov =

Russian mixed martial arts fighter

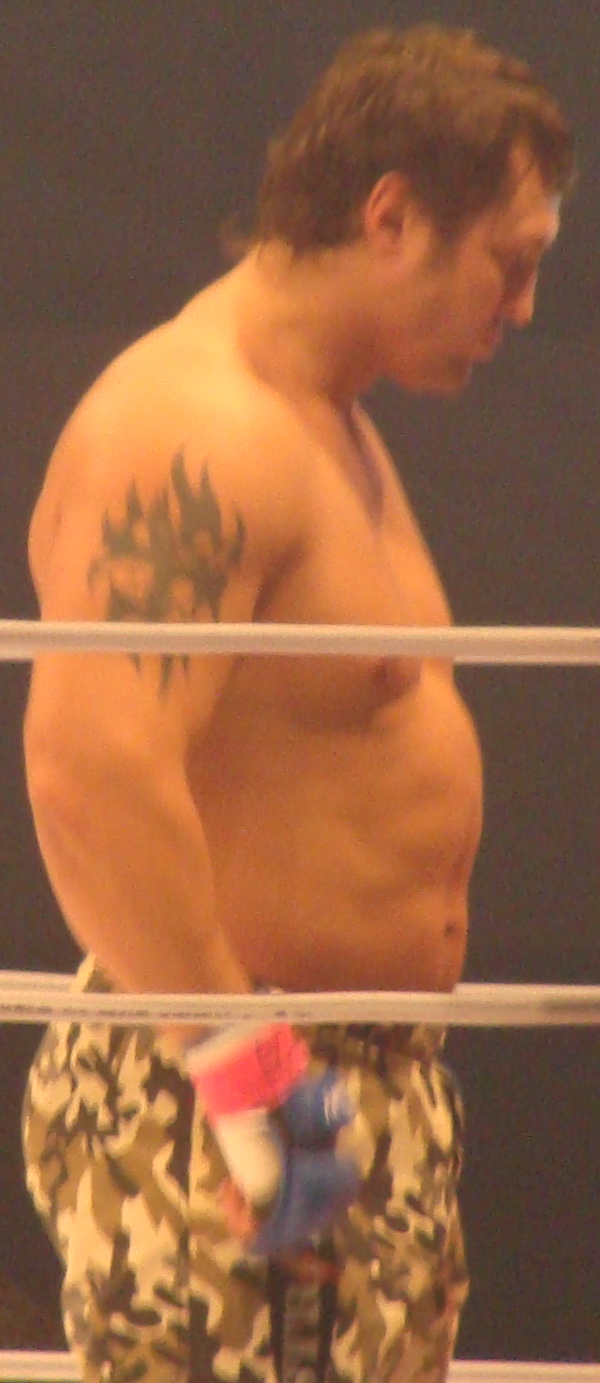
- Zentsov in c. 2008
- Born: September 10, 1973 (age 53); Bryansk, Russian SFSR, Soviet Union
- Native name: Роман Зенцов
- Other names: The Russian Hammer
- Nationality: Russian
- Height: 6 ft 1 in (1.85 m)
- Weight: 230 lb (104 kg; 16 st 6 lb)
- Division: Heavyweight
- Style: Muay Thai, Boxing, Wrestling, Sambo, Karate, Kickboxing
- Fighting out of: St. Petersburg, Russia
- Team: Red Devil Sport Club
- Years active: 2000 – 2008 (MMA)

Professional boxing record
- Total: 3
- Wins: 2
- By knockout: 2
- Losses: 1
- By knockout: 1
- Draws: 0

Mixed martial arts record
- Total: 30
- Wins: 18
- By knockout: 12
- By submission: 3
- By decision: 3
- Losses: 12
- By knockout: 5
- By submission: 6
- By decision: 1

Other information
- Mixed martial arts record from Sherdog

Roman Pavlovich Zentsov (Russian: Роман Павлович Зенцов, [rɐˈman zʲɪnˈʐəf]; born September 10, 1973) is a retired Russian heavyweight mixed martial arts fighter who has competed in the PRIDE Fighting Championships, a major MMA organization based in Japan, and BodogFIGHT. Zentsov has an overall 18-12-0 record in mixed martial arts, and 2-1-0 record in boxing.

== Mixed martial arts career ==
Zentsov is part of the Red Devil Sport Club (team) and has trained extensively with Fedor Emelianenko, PRIDE's Heavyweight champion since he joined the group in 2005. In 2007 Fedor began to also spar heavily with young heavyweight Kirill Sidelnikov, while Roman has trained in St. Petersburg primarily over the past couple years. Roman's head coach is a Muay Thai champion Ruslan Nagnibeda.

== Personal life ==
Zensov hopes to unite all radical Russian right-wing organizations under the banner of one nationalist movement, mobilize the Russian nation on the basis of having external enemies, and to create a national-socialist state. Through his organization, Soprotivlenie ("Resistance"), Zentsov has been known to promote sports as a means of fighting alcoholism, while at the same time being a means of recruiting individuals into right-wing nationalist organizations, such as Demunshkin's SS.

His upper left arm has a tattoo of the kanji words "宮本武蔵" (the samurai warrior Miyamoto Musashi).

== Championships and Accomplishments ==
- M-1 Global
  - M-1 MFC Heavyweight Championship (1 Time)
  - 2000 M-1 MFC European Championship Tournament Runner up
  - 2000 M-1 MFC World Championship Tournament Semifinalist
- 2 Hot 2 Handle
  - 2H2H 3: Hotter Than Hot Tournament Semifinalist

== Mixed martial arts record ==
Professional record breakdown
| 30 matches | 18 wins | 12 losses |
| By knockout | 12 | 5 |
| By submission | 3 | 6 |
| By decision | 3 | 1 |

| Res. | Record | Opponent | Method | Event | Date | Round | Time | Location | Notes |
|---|---|---|---|---|---|---|---|---|---|
| Loss | 18–12 | Lee Sang-Soo | Submission (triangle choke) | M-1 Challenge 6: Korea | August 29, 2008 | 1 | 4:33 | South Korea | |
| Win | 18–11 | Daniel Tabera | Decision | M-1 Challenge 2: Russia | April 3, 2008 | 2 | 5:00 | St. Petersburg, Russia | |
| Loss | 17–11 | Mike Russow | Submission (north/south choke) | Yarennoka! | December 31, 2007 | 1 | 2:58 | Saitama, Japan | |
| Loss | 17–10 | Branden Lee Hinkle | Decision (unanimous) | BodogFIGHT: Alvarez vs. Lee | July 14, 2007 | 3 | 5:00 | Trenton, New Jersey, United States | |
| Win | 17–9 | Kristof Midoux | TKO (corner stoppage) | BodogFIGHT: Clash of the Nations | April 14, 2007 | 1 | 5:00 | St. Petersburg, Russia | |
| Win | 16–9 | Lee Sang-Soo | Decision (unanimous) | M-1 MFC: Russia vs. Korea | January 20, 2007 | 3 | 5:00 | N/A | |
| Win | 15–9 | Kristof Midoux | TKO (punches) | BodogFIGHT: St. Petersburg | December 15, 2006 | 2 | 4:12 | St. Petersburg, Russia | |
| Win | 14–9 | Lee Min Jin | Submission (guillotine choke) | M-1: Mix-Fight Tournament | October 12, 2006 | 1 | 0:55 | Russia | |
| Win | 13–9 | Gilbert Yvel | KO (punch) | PRIDE FC: Total Elimination Absolute | May 5, 2006 | 1 | 4:55 | Osaka, Japan | 2006 PRIDE Openweight Grand Prix Alternate Bout. |
| Win | 12–9 | Pedro Rizzo | KO (Punch) | PRIDE 31: Dreamers | February 26, 2006 | 1 | 0:25 | Saitama, Japan | |
| Win | 11–9 | Ibragim Magomedov | TKO (punches) | M-1 MFC: Russia vs. France | November 3, 2005 | 2 | 4:08 | St. Petersburg, Russia | |
| Loss | 10–9 | Fabrício Werdum | Submission (triangle armbar) | PRIDE FC: Final Conflict 2005 | August 28, 2005 | 1 | 6:01 | Saitama, Japan | |
| Loss | 10–8 | Antoine Jaoude | TKO (injury) | Euphoria: Road to the Titles | October 15, 2004 | 1 | 3:33 | Atlantic City, New Jersey, United States | |
| Loss | 10–7 | Travis Wiuff | TKO (cut) | Euphoria: Russia vs. USA | March 13, 2004 | 2 | 2:46 | Atlantic City, New Jersey, United States | |
| Loss | 10–6 | Michael Knaap | KO (punches) | 2H2H: 2 Hot 2 Handle | February 22, 2004 | 1 | 2:24 | Amsterdam, Netherlands | |
| Win | 10–5 | Bob Schrijber | Submission (choke) | M-1 MFC: Russia vs. the World 6 | October 10, 2003 | 1 | 2:12 | St. Petersburg, Russia | Won the M-1 MFC Heavyweight Championship. |
| Win | 9–5 | Andrey Jangolenko | TKO (submission to punches) | M-1 MFC: Russia vs. Ukraine | June 17, 2003 | 1 | 0:16 | St. Petersburg, Russia | |
| Win | 8–5 | Thomas Rahders | TKO (punches) | M-1 MFC: Russia vs. the World 5 | April 6, 2003 | 1 | 0:20 | St. Petersburg, Russia | |
| Win | 7–5 | Alessio Sakara | Decision | M-1 MFC: Russia vs. the World 4 | November 15, 2002 | 2 | 5:00 | St. Petersburg, Russia | |
| Win | 6–5 | Michailis Deligiannakis | KO | FFG: Heracliones Fight Night | July 28, 2002 | 1 | N/A | Crete, Greece | |
| Win | 5–5 | Rafael Comes | TKO (punches) | M-1 MFC: Russia vs. the World 3 | April 26, 2002 | 1 | 3:27 | St. Petersburg, Russia | |
| Loss | 4–5 | Alistair Overeem | Submission (americana) | 2H2H 4: Simply the Best | March 17, 2002 | 1 | 1:26 | Rotterdam, Netherlands | |
| Win | 4–4 | Bashir Guliev | TKO (kick) | M-1 MFC: Exclusive Fight Night 4 | December 27, 2001 | 1 | 3:35 | St. Petersburg, Russia | |
| Loss | 3–4 | Chalid Arrab | KO | M-1 MFC: Russia vs. the World 2 | November 11, 2001 | 1 | 0:53 | St. Petersburg, Russia | |
| Loss | 3–3 | Moise Rimbon | Submission (neck crank) | 2H2H 3: Hotter Than Hot | October 7, 2001 | 2 | N/A | Rotterdam, Netherlands | 2H2H 3: Hotter Than Hot Tournament Semifinal. |
| Win | 3–2 | Dave van der Veen | TKO (punches) | 2H2H 3: Hotter Than Hot | October 7, 2001 | 1 | 2:15 | Rotterdam, Netherlands | 2H2H 3: Hotter Than Hot Tournament Quarterfinal. |
| Loss | 2–2 | Joop Kasteel | Submission (shoulder lock) | MillenniumSports: Veni Vidi Vici | April 22, 2001 | N/A | N/A | Veenendaal, Netherlands | |
| Win | 2–1 | Herman van Tol | KO (head kick) | M-1 MFC - World Championship 2000 | November 11, 2000 | 1 | 0:10 | St. Petersburg, Russia | 2000 M-1 MFC World Championship Tournament Semifinal. |
| Loss | 1–1 | Andrei Arlovski | TKO (punches) | M-1 MFC - European Championship 2000 | April 9, 2000 | 1 | 1:18 | St. Petersburg, Russia | 2000 M-1 MFC European Championship Tournament Final. |
| Win | 1–0 | Gennadiy Matsigora | Submission (guillotine choke) | M-1 MFC - European Championship 2000 | April 9, 2000 | 1 | 1:56 | St. Petersburg, Russia | 2000 M-1 MFC European Championship Tournament Semifinal. |

== Professional boxing record ==
| Date | Outcome | Record | Opponent | Event | Method | Round | Notes |
| 10 Feb 2005 | W | 2-1 | (Russia) Konstantin Iganskly | Kentaur Club, Moscow, Russian Federation | TKO | 3 | |
| 16 Jul 2003 | W | 1-1 | (Russia) Sergei Tretiakov | Conti Casino, St. Petersburg, Russian Federation | TKO | 3 | |
| 24 Jul 2002 | L | 0-1 | (Belarus) Sergey Dychkov | TBC, Vitebsk, Belarus | KO | 3 | |

== See also ==
- List of male mixed martial artists
