= Rosen Dimitrov =

Bulgarian sambist and mixed martial artist

- Born: Rosen Mitkov Dimitrov; May 10, 1982 (age 44); Sofia, Bulgaria
- Native name: Росен Димитров
- Height: 5 ft 9 in (1.75 m)
- Weight: 170 lb (77 kg; 12 st)
- Division: Middleweight; Welterweight
- Team: TWINS MMA
- Years active: 2007–2019

Mixed martial arts record
- Total: 24
- Wins: 21
- By knockout: 5
- By submission: 13
- By decision: 3
- Losses: 3
- By knockout: 2
- By decision: 1

Other information
- Notable relatives: Rumen Dimitrov (brother)
- Mixed martial arts record from Sherdog
- Last updated on: July 28, 2011

Rosen Dimitrov
Medal record

Men's Combat Sambo

Representing Bulgaria

World Sambo Championships
Gold medal – first place	2011 World Sambo Championships	82 kg
Silver medal – second place	2010 World Sambo Championships	82 kg
Silver medal – second place	2008 World Sambo Championships	82 kg
Gold medal – first place	2007 World Sambo Championships	82 kg

European Sambo Championships
Gold medal – first place	2008 European Sambo Championships	82 kg

Rosen Dimitrov (Bulgarian: Росен Димитров; born May 10, 1982) is a Bulgarian Sambo practitioner who is a three-time world champion in Combat Sambo. He is the trainer of the Bulgarian national team of combat sambo. He is also a mixed martial artist. He has more than 20 MMA fights. With his twin brother Rumen Dimitrov they founded the organization TWINS MMA.

== Mixed martial arts record ==
As of March 2019, Sherdog lists Dimitrov's professional record as 35 wins, 4 losses and one no contest.

Professional record breakdown
40 matches	35 wins	4 losses
By knockout	12	3
By submission	16	0
By decision	7	1
No contests	1	

Res.	Record	Opponent	Method	Event	Date	Round	Time	Location	Notes
Win	35–4 (1)	Wilhelm Ott	TKO (retirement)	Twins MMA - Twins MMA 15	16 March 2019	2	1:20	Pernik, Bulgaria	
Win	34–4 (1)	Todor Zhelyazkov	TKO (punches)	Maxfight - Warriors 40	2 August 2017	1	4:43	Sveti Vlas, Bulgaria	
Win	33–4 (1)	Christos Laskaridis	Submission (heel hook)	Twins MMA - Twins MMA 13	24 March 2017	1	4:51	Stara Zagora, Bulgaria	
Win	32–4 (1)	Giorgos Setelidis	TKO (punches)	Maxfight - Warriors 39	2 August 2016	2	3:52	Burgas, Bulgaria	
Win	31–4 (1)	Cristian Cotea	KO (punch)	Twins MMA 12 - Dimitrov vs. Kotya 2	2 April 2016	2	0:30	Sofia, Bulgaria	
Win	30–4 (1)	Aurel Pirtea	Decision (unanimous)	Maxfight - Warriors 36	2 August 2015	3	5:00	Sveti Vlas, Bulgaria	
Win	29–4 (1)	Cristian Cotea	TKO (punches)	Twins MMA 10 - Dipchikov vs. Mitchell	8 May 2015	2	4:07	Sofia, Bulgaria	
Win	28–4 (1)	Vincent del Guerra	Decision (unanimous)	Twins MMA 9 - Dimitrov vs. del Guerra	13 March 2015	3	5:00	Sofia, Bulgaria	
Win	27–4 (1)	Christos Plasaris	Decision (unanimous)	Twins MMA 8 - Dimitrov vs. Plasaris	13 December 2014	3	5:00	Sofia, Bulgaria	
Win	26–4 (1)	Ioannis Anagnostopoulos	TKO (punches)	Twins MMA 7 - Dimitrov vs. Anagnostopoulos	2 October 2014	2	1:02	Sofia, Bulgaria	
Win	25–4 (1)	Emir Arsanov	Submission (rear-naked choke)	WFN - Warrior Fight Night 2	2 August 2014	1	3:31	Sveti Vlas, Bulgaria	
Win	24–4 (1)	Adria Vinias	Submission (rear-naked choke)	Twins MMA 6 - Galaxy Fight Night	3 July 2014	1	4:39	Sofia, Bulgaria	
Win	23–4 (1)	Felipe Salvador Nsue Ayiugono	Decision (unanimous)	Twins MMA 5 - Dimitrov vs. El Negro	13 May 2014	3	5:00	Sofia, Bulgaria	
Loss	22–4 (1)	Vitor Nobrega	TKO (punches)	Twins MMA 4 - Nobrega vs. Dimitrov	6 February 2014	2	4:10	Sofia, Bulgaria	
Win	22–3 (1)	Semir Djure	Submission (heel hook)	Twins MMA 2 - Dimitrov vs. El Djure	15 December 2013	1	1:30	Sofia, Bulgaria	
NC	21–3 (1)	Ilya Doderkin	No Contest (premature stoppage)	M-1 Global - M-1 Challenge 44	30 November 2013	3	0:59	Tula, Russia	
Win	21–3	Herman Kungu	TKO (doctor stoppage)	Maxfight - Warriors 34	2 August 2013	1	3:16	Burgas, Bulgaria	
Win	20–3	Alexei Martynov	TKO (punches)	COG - Cage of Glory 4	13 July 2013	1	N/A	Varna, Bulgaria	
Loss	19–3	Ronny Alexander Landaeta Utrera	KO (spinning back kick)	Maxfight - Warriors 31	1 March 2013	1	3:01	Sofia, Bulgaria	
Win	19–2	Pavel Malazov	TKO (punches)	Maxfight - Warriors 28	16 June 2012	2	2:25	Sofia, Bulgaria	
Win	18–2	Borche Ivanoski	Submission (guillotine choke)	Maxfight - Warriors 27	11 February 2012	1	1:28	Bansko, Bulgaria	
Win	17–2	Tihon Demovsky	Submission (guillotine choke)	BoG - Battle of Gabrovo	26 November 2011	1		Gabrovo, Bulgaria	
Win	16–2	Boyan Jekov	Submission (achilles lock)	BoG - Battle of Gabrovo	26 November 2011	1		Gabrovo, Bulgaria	
Win	15–2	Nikolai Alexiev	Submission (rear-naked choke)	Maxfight - Warriors 24	2 August 2011	2	2:44	Burgas, Bulgaria	
Win	14–2	Danijel Dzebic	Submission (punches)	RPC - Battle of the Fortress	25 June 2011	2		Veliko Tarnovo, Bulgaria	
Win	13–2	Jesus Rodriguez	TKO (punches)	Maxfight - Warriors 21	27 May 2011	1	3:15	Sofia, Bulgaria	
Win	12–2	Ivica Truscek	Submission (guillotine choke)	Maxfight - Warriors 19	10 March 2011	2	3:57	Sofia, Bulgaria	
Win	11–2	Ivan Ivanov	TKO (punches)	Maxfight - Warriors 16	2 August 2010	2	3:15	Burgas, Bulgaria	
Win	10–2	Deivison Francisco Ribeiro	TKO (punches)	Maxfight - Warriors 15	3 July 2010	3	3:35	Burgas, Bulgaria	
Win	9–2	Riccardo Schiesaro	Submission (achilles lock)	RPC - Domination	10 April 2010	1		Sofia, Bulgaria	
Win	8–2	Lubomir Guedjev	Decision (unanimous)	Maxfight - Warriors 11	19 September 2009	3	5:00	Kardzhali, Bulgaria	
Win	7–2	Ivan Brguljan	Submission (rear-naked choke)	Maxfight - Warriors 10	2 August 2009	1	2:10	Burgas, Bulgaria	
Win	6–2	Mikko Suvanto	Decision (majority)	M-1 Challenge 17 - Korea	4 July 2009	2	5:00	Seoul, South Korea	
Win	5–2	Nikolay Dobrudzhanski	Decision (unanimous)	Maxfight - Warriors 7	15 February 2009			Bulgaria	
Loss	4–2	Sergey Kornev	TKO (punches)	M-1 Challenge 7 - UK	27 September 2008	1	2:59	Nottingham, England	
Win	4–1	Oliver Miller	Submission (guillotine choke)	RPC 2 - Real Pain Challenge 2	17 May 2008	2	2:30	Sofia, Bulgaria	
Loss	3–1	Jordan Radev	Decision (unanimous)	RPC 1 - Real Pain Challenge 1	9 March 2008	3	5:00	Sofia, Bulgaria	
Win	3–0	Loncar Andrija	Submission (achilles lock)	BCM - MMA Open Sofia	21 December 2007	1	1:21	Sofia, Bulgaria	
Win	2–0	Nikolay Parchev	Submission (verbal)	Shooto - Bulgaria	2 October 2007	1		Bulgaria	
Win	1–0	Petar Mateev	Submission (guillotine choke)	Shooto - Bulgaria	12 May 2007	1	2:15	Bulgaria	
