= Ivica Trušček =

Croatian mixed martial artist (born 1987)

- Born: 15 December 1987 (age 38)
- Other names: Terror
- Nationality: Croatian
- Height: 5 ft 9 in (175 cm)
- Division: Welterweight
- Team: American Top Team Zagreb
- Years active: 2007–present

Mixed martial arts record
- Total: 86
- Wins: 46
- Losses: 40

Other information
- Mixed martial arts record from Sherdog

Ivica Trušček (born 15 December 1987) is a Croatian professional mixed martial artist who competes in the welterweight division. One of the most active fighters in European mixed martial arts, he has competed in more than 85 professional bouts since 2007 and has been described as the record holder for the most fights in the Balkan region. He is a former World Freefight Challenge (WFC) welterweight champion and has fought for promotions including Final Fight Championship, Cage Warriors, M-1 Global, Oktagon MMA and Fight Nation Championship (FNC).

== Background ==
Trušček is from the area of Križevci in northern Croatia. Unable to support himself through fighting alone, he worked part-time in his father's printing business while competing, training with American Top Team Zagreb when he could travel to the capital and otherwise practicing with his brother. In later years he worked as a truck driver during the week and as a security guard at weekends.

== Mixed martial arts career ==
Trušček made his professional debut in 2007 and fought at an unusually high frequency, entering the cage or ring 43 times between February 2010 and April 2016 alone. His opponents included several fighters who went on to compete in the UFC, among them Mairbek Taisumov, Piotr Hallmann and future UFC lightweight champion Islam Makhachev, who submitted Trušček at an M-1 Global event in September 2014.

Trušček twice fought the Danish welterweight Nicolas Dalby, losing decisions in August 2012 and March 2013; the second bout was accepted on four days' notice. The two became friends, and when Dalby faced Zak Cummings at UFC Fight Night 86 in Zagreb in April 2016, Trušček worked in Dalby's corner.

As World Freefight Challenge welterweight champion, Trušček defended the title against Sergei Churilov at WFC 17 in October 2012. He won the WFC welterweight title a second time by submitting Arber Murati at WFC 23 in February 2019. In October 2015 he knocked out Final Fight Championship welterweight champion Viktor Halmi in the first round of a non-title bout.

In February 2025 Trušček took a bare-knuckle boxing bout for the Croatian promotion FNC in Zadar. On 18 October 2025, at Oktagon 78 in Cologne, he defeated the German welterweight Christian Eckerlin by first-round technical knockout in the event's headline bout, an upset before a crowd of about 20,000 at Lanxess Arena that was broadcast on German television. In May 2026, aged 38, he challenged Kamil Kraska for the FNC welterweight championship in Belgrade, losing by second-round technical knockout.

== Mixed martial arts record ==
Professional record breakdown
86 matches	46 wins	40 losses
By knockout	26	9
By submission	16	17
By decision	4	14

Res.	Record	Opponent	Method	Event	Date	Round	Time	Location	Notes
Loss	46–40	Kamil Kraska	TKO (punches and elbows)	FNC 31	May 30, 2026	2	3:14	Belgrade, Serbia	For the FNC Welterweight Championship.
Win	46–39	Dominic Schober	Decision (unanimous)	FNC 27	February 7, 2026	3	5:00	Munich, Germany	Catchweight (174 lb) bout.
Win	45–39	Christian Eckerlin	TKO (elbows)	Oktagon 78	October 18, 2025	1	3:34	Cologne, Germany	
Win	44–39	Marko Vardjan	Submission (guillotine choke)	FNC 15	March 30, 2024	1	1:06	Ljubljana, Slovenia	Catchweight (180 lb) bout.
Win	43–39	Cihad Akipa	Technical Submission (guillotine choke)	Oktagon 53	10 February 2024	2	2:22	Oberhausen, Germany	
Loss	42–39	Jovan Marjanovic	TKO (leg injury)	FNC 13	November 4, 2023	2	3:20	Belgrade, Serbia	
Loss	42–38	Marko Kisič	Decision (split)	FNC 11	May 28, 2023	3	5:00	Zagreb, Croatia	
Win	42–37	Tonci Perusko	KO (knee and punches)	FNC 8	November 5, 2022	1	2:27	Zagreb, Croatia	
Loss	41–37	Savo Lazić	TKO (punches)	FNC 7	September 3, 2022	1	0:18	Pula, Croatia	
Loss	41–36	Christian Jungwirth	TKO (punches)	Oktagon 33	June 4, 2022	2	4:09	Frankfurt, Germany	
Win	41–35	Aleksandar Jankovic	TKO (punches)	FNC 5	March 26, 2022	2	4:36	Zabok, Croatia	
Win	40–35	Kuitty Begaj	Submission (guillotine choke)	FNC: Armagedon 2 Finals	December 4, 2021	2	0:43	Osijek, Croatia	
Win	39–35	Vaso Bakočević	Submission (guillotine choke)	FNC 3	July 31, 2020	2	3:49	Zagreb, Croatia	Won the symbolic "Balkan BMF" title.
Loss	38–35	Benoît Saint Denis	Submission (kneebar)	Brave CF 34	January 19, 2020	1	3:39	Ljubljana, Slovenia	
Loss	38–34	Shamil Zavurov	TKO (punches)	Gorilla Fighting 20	November 23, 2019	3	3:13	Tashkent, Uzbekistan	
Loss	38–33	Krystian Kaszubowski	Decision (split)	KSW 51	November 9, 2019	3	5:00	Zagreb, Croatia	
Win	38–32	Arber Murati	Submission (Von Flue choke)	World Freefight Challenge 23	February 17, 2019	1	2:37	Ljubljana, Slovenia	Won the WFC Welterweight Championship.
Win	37–32	Hiroki Kishino	Submission (guillotine choke)	Rings: The Outsider 51	July 21, 2018	1	4:29	Kawasaki, Japan	Catchweight (172 lb) bout.
Win	36–32	Colin Fletcher	Submission (guillotine choke)	M4TC 27	June 9, 2018	2	1:20	Houghton-le-Spring, England	Return to Welterweight.
Win	35–32	Marko Drmonjič	Decision (split)	World Freefight Challenge 22	May 19, 2018	3	5:00	Ljubljana, Slovenia	
Win	34–32	Krsto Bukumiric	KO (knee)	Combat Challenge 12	February 25, 2018	2	2:28	Pančevo, Serbia	
Win	33–32	Dragutin Milošević	TKO (punches)	Athletic FC 1	17 February 2018	1	N/A	Zlatibor, Serbia	Return to Middleweight. Won the inaugural Athletic FC Middleweight Championship.
Loss	32–32	Stefan Sekulić	Submission (guillotine choke)	Serbian Battle Championship 15	December 8, 2017	2	0:56	Novi Sad, Serbia	Catchweight (176 lb) bout.
Loss	32–31	Zhang Lipeng	TKO (punches)	Kunlun Fight MMA 14	August 28, 2017	1	N/A	Shandong, China	
Win	32–30	Leon Vinogradać	TKO (punches)	Fight in the West 3	August 4, 2017	1	0:48	Knin, Croatia	Lightweight bout.
Loss	31–30	Borce Talevski	Decision (unanimous)	Munja FC 1	January 21, 2017	2	5:00	Zagreb, Croatia	
Loss	31–29	Roberto Soldić	TKO (punches)	Final Fight Championship 27	December 17, 2016	1	1:47	Zagreb, Croatia	
Loss	31–28	Danila Prikaza	Decision (split)	M-1 Challenge 72	November 18, 2016	3	5:00	Moscow, Russia	
Loss	31–27	Giovanni Melillo	Decision (split)	Road to Abu Dhabi Warriors 5	October 8, 2016	3	5:00	Kuala Lumpur, Malaysia	Return to Welterweight.
Loss	31–26	Abusupiyan Magomedov	Submission (rear-naked choke)	Final Fight Championship 26	September 23, 2016	2	4:50	Linz, Austria	Catchweight (176 lb) bout.
Loss	31–25	Ali Eskiev	Submission (rear-naked choke)	Spartacus FC 3	July 30, 2016	3	3:39	Varna, Bulgaria	Middleweight debut.
Win	31–24	Vladislav Kanchev	TKO (punches)	Final Fight Championship 21	November 27, 2015	2	2:15	Rijeka, Croatia	
Win	30–24	Viktor Halmi	KO (punch)	Final Fight Championship 20	October 23, 2015	1	4:30	Zagreb, Croatia	Catchweight (163 lb) bout.
Loss	29–24	Abubakar Vagaev	Decision (unanimous)	WFCA 6	August 22, 2015	3	5:00	Grozny, Russia	
Win	29–23	Sidarta Patarčić	TKO (punches)	Montenegro FC 3	July 27, 2015	1	1:39	Budva, Montenegro	
Win	28–23	Josip Balentović	TKO (punches)	Nokaut FC: Contest 3	May 10, 2015	1	3:15	Zagreb, Croatia	
Win	27–23	László Soltész	TKO (punches)	Final Fight Championship 18	April 17, 2015	1	2:57	Ljubljana, Slovenia	
Win	26–23	Rusmir Jugović	TKO (punches)	Arti FC 4	March 15, 2015	1	2:17	Ljubuški, Bosnia and Herzegovina	Catchweight (179 lb) bout.
Loss	25–23	Damir Mihajlović	Decision (majority)	Serbian Battle Championship 4	December 6, 2014	3	5:00	Novi Sad, Serbia	
Loss	25–22	Islam Makhachev	Submission (triangle choke)	M-1 Challenge 51	September 7, 2014	3	4:45	Saint Petersburg, Russia	Catchweight (165 lb) bout.
Loss	25–21	Arbi Agujev	TKO (punches)	National FC 1	May 3, 2014	1	0:57	Vienna, Austria	Return to Welterweight.
Win	25–20	Michael Pfundner	Submission (rear-naked choke)	Final Fight Championship 12	April 25, 2014	1	3:21	Ljubljana, Slovenia	
Loss	24–20	Imanali Gamzathanov	Submission (arm-triangle choke)	MMA Star in the Ring: Shamil vs. Renat	March 1, 2014	2	0:51	Makhachkala, Russia	
Win	24–19	Leonardo Zecchi	KO (head kick)	Final Fight Championship 9	November 15, 2013	1	0:18	Ljubljana, Slovenia	
Win	23–19	Gojko Vuković	TKO (kicks)	Final Fight Championship 8	October 25, 2013	1	2:13	Zagreb, Croatia	
Win	22–19	Muamer Jugović	TKO (punches)	Mix Fight Explosion: Bibinje Fight Night	3 August 2013	1	4:10	Bibinje, Croatia	
Loss	21–19	László Sényei	Decision (unanimous)	Final Fight Championship 6	June 14, 2013	3	5:00	Poreč, Croatia	Welterweight bout.
Win	21–18	Vaso Bakočević	TKO (punches)	Final Fight Championship 4	May 10, 2013	2	1:28	Zadar, Croatia	
Loss	20–18	Nicolas Dalby	Decision (unanimous)	WKN Valhalla: Battle of the Vikings 2013	March 9, 2013	3	5:00	Aarhus, Denmark	Welterweight bout.
Loss	20–17	Ayub Tashkilot	Decision (split)	European MMA 4	March 2, 2013	3	5:00	Viborg, Denmark	
Loss	20–16	Piotr Hallmann	Submission (rear-naked choke)	Celtic Gladiator 6	February 9, 2013	2	2:03	Saggart, Ireland	Return to Lightweight. For the inaugural CG Lightweight Championship.
Loss	20–15	Igor Egorov	Submission (armbar)	ProFC 46	February 3, 2013	1	1:18	Kursk, Russia	
Loss	20–14	Murad Machaev	Submission (brabo choke)	Fight Nights: Battle of Moscow 9	December 16, 2012	1	2:14	Moscow, Russia	Catchweight (163 lb) bout.
Loss	20–13	Artem Damkovsky	Decision (split)	M-1 Challenge 33	November 15, 2012	3	5:00	Saint Petersburg, Russia	
Win	20–12	Sergei Churilov	TKO (punches)	World Freefight Challenge 17	21 October 2012	2	3:22	Ljubljana, Slovenia	Defended the WFC Welterweight Championship.
Loss	19–12	Nicolas Dalby	Decision (unanimous)	Royal Arena 2	August 31, 2012	3	5:00	Copenhagen, Denmark	
Loss	19–11	Mukhamed Aushev	Decision (split)	M-1 Challenge 33	June 6, 2012	3	5:00	Dzheyrakh, Russia	
Win	19–10	Jevgeniy Mahteenko	TKO (punches)	World Freefight Challenge 16	April 22, 2012	3	4:02	Ljubljana, Slovenia	Return to Welterweight.
Win	18–10	Kenneth Rosfort-Nees	Decision (unanimous)	Royal Arena 1	March 10, 2012	3	5:00	Brøndby Municipality, Denmark	
Loss	17–10	Diego Gonzalez	Submission (guillotine choke)	Cage Warriors 46	February 23, 2012	2	3:25	Kyiv, Ukraine	
Win	17–9	Lubomir Guedjev	TKO (doctor stoppage)	World Freefight Challenge 15	December 18, 2011	2	5:00	Ljubljana, Slovenia	Won the vacant WFC Welterweight Championship.
Win	16–9	Jarkko Latomaki	Submission (rear-naked choke)	CAGE 17	November 5, 2011	1	4:59	Oulu, Finland	Return to Lightweight.
Loss	15–9	Igor Araújo	Submission (rear-naked choke)	Lions FC 1	October 15, 2011	2	4:44	Neuchâtel, Switzerland	
Win	15–8	Amir Visalimov	Submission (kimura)	World Freefight Challenge 14	June 12, 2011	1	1:54	Ljubljana, Slovenia	
Win	14–8	Fabricio Nascimento	TKO (punches)	Born to Fight: Milano in the Cage 1	May 7, 2011	1	N/A	Milan, Italy	
Win	13–8	André Luis Oliveira	TKO (punches)	Noc Gladijatora 3	April 23, 2011	2	N/A	Novi Travnik, Bosnia and Herzegovina	
Win	12–8	Josif Al Said	TKO (punches)	World Freefight Challenge 13	April 17, 2011	2	2:43	Belgrade, Serbia	
Loss	11–8	Rosen Dimitrov	Submission (guillotine choke)	Maxfight: Warriors 19	March 10, 2011	2	3:57	Sofia, Bulgaria	Return to Welterweight.
Loss	11–7	Ivan Musardo	Submission (guillotine choke)	Real Pain Challenge 10	February 18, 2011	1	N/A	Sofia, Bulgaria	
Loss	11–6	Niko Puhakka	Submission (rear-naked choke)	Fight Festival 29	January 31, 2011	1	1:08	Uusimaa, Finland	
Loss	11–5	Mairbek Taisumov	Submission (rear-naked choke)	Gladiator CF 1	December 5, 2010	1	1:19	Prague, Czech Republic	
Win	11–4	Lincon Rodrigues	TKO (punches)	Security Fight Night 5	November 28, 2010	2	2:28	Zagreb, Croatia	Welterweight bout.
Win	10–4	Jetmir Emruli	TKO (punches)	Milenium Fight Challenge 4	June 4, 2010	1	N/A	Dalmatia, Croatia	
Win	9–4	Semir Kovacevic	TKO (punches)	Milenium Fighting Challenge 2	May 7, 2010	1	N/A	Slavonski Brod, Croatia	
Loss	8–4	Julien Boussuge	Submission (kimura)	M-1 Selection 2010: Western Europe Round 1	February 5, 2010	1	2:11	Hilversum, Netherlands	Return to Lightweight.
Win	8–3	Rafael Torres Henrique	Submission (rear-naked choke)	Milenium Fighting Challenge 1	November 28, 2009	1	N/A	Split, Croatia	
Win	7–3	Miljan Jaksic	TKO (punches)	Ultra FC: Stop the Crime	October 31, 2009	1	3:45	Subotica, Serbia	
Win	6–3	Jordan James	Submission (armbar)	Predator Fight Night 3	September 27, 2009	1	0:40	Swansea, Wales	Welterweight debut.
Loss	5–3	Denis Dejanovic	Decision (unanimous)	Obracun u Zelina 1	June 20, 2009	2	5:00	Sveti Ivan Zelina, Croatia	
Win	5–2	Miran Fabjan	Submission (armbar)	World Freefight Challenge 6	September 27, 2008	1	N/A	Sofia, Bulgaria	
Win	4–2	Davor Jugovac	Decision (unanimous)	Colosseum Sports Festival 1	August 31, 2008	3	5:00	Pula, Croatia	
Loss	3–2	Dalibor Anastasov	TKO	World Freefight Challenge 4	March 29, 2008	3	N/A	Ljubljana, Slovenia	
Loss	3–1	Danial Sharifi	Submission (armbar)	Ultimate Fight Challenge 2	December 15, 2007	1	0:55	Samobor, Croatia	
Win	3–0	Gregor Pongrac	Submission (guillotine choke)	Trboulje Cage: Fight Night 1	October 27, 2007	2	N/A	Trbovlje, Slovenia	
Win	2–0	Thomas Hengstberger	Submission (guillotine choke)	MedVid: Anno Domini 1	June 9, 2007	N/A	N/A	Pula, Croatia	
Win	1–0	Lorant Grof	Submission (guillotine choke)	Viadal 3	May 19, 2007	N/A	N/A	Budapest, Hungary	Lightweight debut.

== Championships and accomplishments ==
- World Freefight Challenge
  - WFC Welterweight Championship (two times)
