= Rustamov =

Rustamov is a masculine surname, its feminine counterpart is Rustamova. Notable people with the surname include:

- Elman Rustamov (born 1952), Azerbaijani politician
- Hasan Rustamov (born 1987), Tajikistani football player
- Said Rustamov (1907–1983), Azerbaijani composer and conductor
- Samad Rustamov, Uzbekistani sambo practitioner
- Sardor Rustamov (born 1993), Uzbekistani archer
- Tursunali Rustamov (born 1990), Kyrgyzstani footballer
- Zebiniso Rustamova (born 1955), Tajikistani archer
