= Soninkhüügiin Orkhonbaatar =

Mongolian martial artist (born 1977)

Personal information
- Nationality: Mongolia
- Born: 1977 (age 48–49) Sant, Selenge province, Mongolia
- Height: 1.69 m (5 ft 6 1/2 in)
- Weight: 57 kg (126 lb)

Sport
- Sport: Sambo
- Event: 57 kg
Medal record
Men's сombat sambo
Representing Mongolia
World Championships
| Gold medal – first place | 2006 Sofia | 57 kg |

Soninkhüügiin Orkhonbaatar (Mongolian: Сонинхүүгийн Орхонбаатар; born 1977) is a Mongolian martial artist. Orkhonbaatar held a winner title for the 57 kg class at the World Combat Sambo Championships in 2006.

Orkhonbaatar started practicing the sambo wrestling and Olympic judo at the age of 12. In 1995, at the national youth championship, he won a gold medal in the judo and silver medal in the sambo. In 1999, he graduated from the University "Ikh Shav", founded by Jigjidiin Mönkhbat, specializing in coaching and methodology of the physical culture. In 2006 Orkhonbaatar became the world champion in the combat sambo. When he was the active wrestler, he trained at the "Khüi Mandal" Club. He works in Department of Physical Education and Sports, Selenge Province.
