= 2011 in M-1 Global =

Mixed martial arts events

Information
- First date: February 12, 2011
- Last date: December 17, 2011

Events
- Total events: 20

Fights
- Total fights: 225

Chronology
2010 in M-1	2011 in M-1 Global	2012 in M-1

The year 2011 is the 15th year in the history of M-1 Global, a mixed martial arts promotion based in Russia. In 2011 M-1 Global held 20 events beginning with, M-1 Selection Ukraine 2010: The Finals.

== Events list ==
#	Event Title	Date	Arena	Location
140	M-1 Ukraine: Superfinal Grand Prix	December 17, 2011	Acco International Exhibition Center	Kyiv, Ukraine
139	M-1 Challenge 30: Zavurov vs. Enomoto	December 9, 2011	The Hangar	Costa Mesa, California, United States
138	M-1 Global: Fedor vs. Monson	November 20, 2011	Olympic Stadium	Moscow, Russia
137	M-1 Challenge 29: Samoilov vs. Miranda	November 19, 2011	Ufa Arena	Ufa, Bashkortostan, Russia
136	M-1 Belarus 13: Belarus Fighting Championship	November 12, 2011	Orion Night Club	Minsk, Belarus
135	M-1 Challenge 28: Emelianenko vs. Malikov	November 12, 2011	Star Centre	Astrakhan, Russia
134	M-1 Ukraine: Battle of Minsk	October 15, 2011	Minsk Sports Palace	Minsk, Belarus
133	M-1 Challenge 27: Magalhaes vs. Zayats	October 14, 2011	GCU Arena	Phoenix, Arizona, United States
132	M-1 Belarus: Battle of Minsk	September 17, 2011	Orion	Minsk, Belarus
131	M-1 Ukraine: King of Mixfight	September 15, 2011	Crystal Hall	Kyiv, Ukraine
130	M-1 Global: M-1 Fighter Tournament	August 6, 2011	Saint Petersburg	Leningrad Oblast, Russia
129	M-1 Challenge 26: Garner vs. Bennett 2	July 8, 2011	The Hangar at the O.C. Fair and Events Center	Costa Mesa, California, United States
128	M-1 Global: M-1 Ukraine European Battle	June 4, 2011	National Circus of Ukraine	Kyiv, Ukraine
127	M-1 Global - Mix Fight M-1	May 21, 2011	Orlyonok Sport Palace	Perm, Perm Krai, Russia
126	M-1 Selection 2011: Asia Round 1	April 30, 2011	Seoul Fashion Center Event Hall	Seoul, South Korea
125	M-1 Challenge 25: Zavurov vs. Enomoto	April 28, 2011	Ice Palace Saint Petersburg	Saint Petersburg, Leningrad Oblast, Russia
124	M-1 Ukraine: International Club Grand Prix 1	April 2, 2011	Acco International Exhibition Center	Kyiv, Ukraine
123	M-1 Selection 2011: European Tournament	April 1, 2011	Ali Aliyev Sports Complex	Makhachkala, Russia
122	M-1 Challenge 24: Damkovsky vs. Figueroa	March 25, 2011	Ted Constant Convocation Center	Norfolk, Virginia, United States
121	M-1 Challenge 23: Guram vs. Grishin	March 5, 2011	Crocus City Hall	Moscow, Russia
120	M-1 Selection Ukraine 2010: The Finals	February 12, 2011	Acco International Exhibition Center	Kyiv, Ukraine

== M-1 Selection Ukraine 2010: The Finals ==
M-1 Selection Ukraine 2010: The Finals was an event held on February 12, 2011, at Acco International Exhibition Center in Kyiv, Ukraine.

=== Results ===
Main Card
Weight class				Method	Round	Time	Notes
	Beslan Mashukov	def.	Besik Gobedzhashvili	Submission (Armbar)	1	3:13
	Islam Makhachev	def.	Tengiz Khuchua	KO (Punch)	1	0:30
	Alexander Romaschenko	def.	Vitaly Smirnov	Submission (Armbar)	1	2:39
	Sergey Guzev	def.	Roman Bagin	Submission (Rear-Naked Choke)	1	1:39
	Ruslan Khaskhanov	def.	Rustam Khabilov	Decision (Split)	3	5:00
	Khabib Nurmagomedov	def.	Alexander Agafonov	TKO (Corner Stoppage)	2	5:00
	Evgeni Khavilov	def.	Vadim Khaitulov	Decision (Unanimous)	3	5:00
	Alexander Kozyr	def.	Alexey Naumov	Submission (Triangle Choke)	2	2:34
	Vahan Bojukyan	def.	Vyacheslav Kostyuk	Submission (Rear-Naked Choke)	1	2:22
	Saparbek Safarov	def.	Vasily Klepikov	Submission (Rear-Naked Choke)	1	1:18
	Alexander Dolotenko	def.	Igor Shpatenko	Decision (Unanimous)	3	5:00
	Vladimir Opanasenko	def.	Vasily Novikov	Submission (Triangle Choke)	1	2:20
	Serhiy Adamchuk	def.	Yuri Saakyan	Decision (Unanimous)	3	5:00
	Vladimir Katyhin	def.	Alexey Smirnov	TKO (Doctor Stoppage)	1	0:00

== M-1 Challenge 23: Guram vs. Grishin ==
M-1 Challenge 23: Guram vs. Grishin was an event held on March 5, 2011, at Crocus City Hall in Moscow, Russia.

=== Results ===
Main Card
Weight class				Method	Round	Time	Notes
	Rashid Magomedov	def.	Rafal Moks	TKO (Punches)	1	2:05
	Mairbek Taisumov	def.	Yuri Ivlev	TKO (Punches)	2	1:38
	Guram Gugenishvili	def.	Maxim Grishin	Submission (Rear-Naked Choke)	1	3:38
	Shamil Zavurov	def.	Tom Gallicchio	TKO (Punches)	2	1:11
	Magomed Sultanakhmedov	def.	Plinio Cruz	TKO (Punches)	2	1:13
	Daniel Weichel	def.	Magomedrasul Khasbulaev	Technical Submission (Triangle Choke)	1	3:26
	Arsen Abdulkerimov	def.	Goncalo Salgado	Submission (Armbar)	1	2:42
	Igor Savelyev	def.	Byron Byrd	Submission (Arm-Triangle Choke)	2	2:16
	Tomasz Narkun	def.	Shamil Tinagadjiev	Submission (Triangle Choke)	1	3:32
	Magomed Ismailov	def.	Maxim Bulakhtin	Submission (Rear-Naked Choke)	2	0:48
	Nikolai Kaushansky	def.	Vusal Bayramov	Submission (Rear-Naked Choke)	1	1:31

== M-1 Challenge 24: Damkovsky vs. Figueroa ==
M-1 Challenge 24: Damkovsky vs. Figueroa was an event held on March 25, 2011, at Ted Constant Convocation Center in Norfolk, Virginia, United States.

=== Results ===
Main Card
Weight class				Method	Round	Time	Notes
	Jose Figueroa	def.	Artiom Damkovsky	TKO (Punches)	2	2:28
	Magomed Sultanakhmedov	def.	Tyson Jeffries	TKO (Knees to the Body)	2	3:07
	Vinny Magalhaes	def.	Jake Doerr	TKO (Punches)	1	1:47
	Jason Norwood	def.	Billy Horne	Decision (Unanimous)	3	5:00
	Alexander Sarnavskiy	def.	Beau Baker	Submission (Rear-Naked Choke)	2	2:32
	Jessie Riggleman	def.	Jason Hilliker	Submission (Guillotine Choke)	1	3:13
	George Sheppard	def.	David Derby	TKO (Punches)	1	1:50
	Johnny Curtis	def.	Bobby Gurley	KO (Punch to the Body)	1	0:36
	Colton Smith	def.	Brian Nielson	Submission (Rear-Naked Choke)	1	4:19
	Bethany Marshall	def.	Stacy Grant	Submission (Toe Hold)	2	1:49
	Bryan Lashomb	def.	Marcus Daniels	TKO (Punches)	1	0:57

== M-1 Selection 2011: European Tournament ==
M-1 Selection 2011: European Tournament was an event held on April 1, 2011, at Ali Aliyev Sports Complex in Makhachkala, Russia.

=== Results ===
Main Card
Weight class				Method	Round	Time	Notes
	Khanilav Khanilaev	def.	Santiago Pereira	KO (Punch)	1	0:56
	Salim Daudov	def.	Roman Bagin	TKO (Corner Stoppage)	2	0:22
	Sergey Kornev	def.	Antonio Gonzalez	Submission (Punches)	1	2:41
	Saparbek Safarov	def.	Adrien Mallebranche	TKO (Punch)	1	0:04
	Acoidan Duque	def.	Sergey Faustov	Submission (Rear-Naked Choke)	1	1:58
	Gasanali Gasanaliev	def.	Josef Kral	TKO (Punches)	1	1:33
	Gael Grimaud	def.	Ramazan Abdulzhalilov	Submission (Guillotine Choke)	2	0:39
	Shamil Abdulkerimov	def.	Sully Bull	Submission (Guillotine Choke)	3	2:20
	Jerome Bouisson	def.	Alexander Kozyr	Submission (Rear-Naked Choke)	1	3:25
	Shahbulat Shamhalaev	def.	Yves Landu	Decision (Unanimous)	3	5:00
	Alexey Nevzorov	def.	Antun Racic	Technical Submission (Armbar)	1	3:55
	Magomed Yakubov	def.	Eldarhan Machukaev	KO (Punch)	1	2:43
	Gadzhimurad Antigulov	def.	Sergey Filimonov	Submission (Guillotine Choke)	2	0:51
	Ramazan Esenbaev	def.	Gadzhi Gadzhiev	Decision (Unanimous)	2	5:00
	Alexander Tokarev	def.	Pavel Kokarev	Submission (Triangle Armbar)	1	2:22
	Vugar Bakhshiev	def.	Jack Magee	Submission (Heel Hook)	1	0:46
	Yunus Tagirov	def.	Radik Iboyan	Submission (Rear-Naked Choke)	2	1:00
	Stanislav Molodcov	def.	Magomedsalam Kaynurov	Submission (Rear-Naked Choke)	1	0:55

== M-1 Ukraine: International Club Grand Prix 1 ==
M-1 Ukraine: International Club Grand Prix 1 was an event held on April 2, 2011, at Acco International Exhibition Center in Kyiv, Ukraine.

=== Results ===
Main Card
Weight class				Method	Round	Time	Notes
	Georgi Makoev	def.	Vyacheslav Kostyuk	Submission (Rear-Naked Choke)	1	3:00
	Vladimir Kryzhanovsky	def.	Anar Mustafayev	TKO (Punches)	1	1:27
	Vasily Novikov	def.	Ali Akhmedov	Submission (Heel Hook)	1	3:07
	Artem Perehristyuk	def.	Semir Agadzhiev	Decision (Unanimous)	3	5:00
	Bahtiyar Arzumanov	def.	Yuri Gamali	Submission (Triangle Choke)	1	0:38
	Muslim Makhmudov	def.	Viorel Lipa	Submission (Guillotine Choke)	1	1:10
	Pavel Doroftei	def.	Vasily Klepikov	TKO (Punches)	1	1:33
	Alexander Dolotenko	def.	Vlad Moraru	Submission (Triangle Choke)	1	1:50
	Vladimir Opanasenko	def.	Dmitry Kapmar	Submission (Triangle Choke)	1	4:28
	Serhiy Adamchuk	def.	Vlad Cherbadzhi	KO (Punch)	1	4:49
	Igor Zadernovsky	def.	Alexey Lipovoy	Submission (Achilles Lock)	1	0:37
	Vagab Vagabov	def.	Aleksandr Kovsun	Submission (Triangle Choke)	1	1:44
	Murad Magomedov	def.	Zeka Sherifov	TKO (Punches)	1	3:35
	Sergei Dzygansky	def.	Nikolai Burle	Submission (Heel Hook)	1	0:47
	Magomed Magomedov	def.	Ivan Prokopenko	Submission (Guillotine Choke)	1	1:27

== M-1 Challenge 25: Zavurov vs. Enomoto ==
M-1 Challenge 25: Zavurov vs. Enomoto was an event held on April 28, 2011, at Ice Palace Saint Petersburg in Saint Petersburg, Leningrad Oblast, Russia.

=== Results ===
Main Card
Weight class				Method	Round	Time	Notes
	Andrei Semenov	def.	Luigi Fioravanti	Decision (Unanimous)	3	5:00
	Vinny Magalhaes	def.	Viktor Nemkov	Submission (Gogoplata Neck Crank)	3	1:40
	Shamil Zavurov	def.	Yasubey Enomoto	Decision (Unanimous)	5	5:00
	Alexander Yakovlev	def.	Christian Eckerlin	Submission (Rear-Naked Choke)	2	3:14
	Mikhail Zayats	def.	Malik Merad	TKO (Punches)	2	0:49
	Maxim Grishin	def.	Vladimir Kuchenko	TKO (Leg Kick and Punches)	3	3:14
	Alexander Volkov	def.	Denis Goltsov	TKO (Punches)	2	3:05
	Juan Manuel Suarez	def.	Arsen Temirkhanov	Decision (Unanimous)	3	5:00
	Ramazan Emeev	def.	Murad Magomedov	Decision (Unanimous)	3	5:00
	Ramazan Esenbaev	def.	Albert Akhmedov	TKO (Punches)	2	2:49

== M-1 Selection 2011: Asia Round 1 ==
M-1 Selection 2011: Asia Round 1 was an event held on April 30, 2011, at Seoul Fashion Center Event Hall in Seoul, South Korea.

=== Results ===
Main Card
Weight class				Method	Round	Time	Notes
	Young-Woo Yu	def.	Masanori Iwamoto	TKO (Punches)	1	2:28
	Doo Hwan Kim	def.	Makoto Niyama	Submission (Rear-Naked Choke)	1	0:00
	Jun-Hee Moon	def.	Yoshihito Kuroki	Submission (Triangle Choke)	1	2:40
	Seung Ho Ahn	def.	Kazutoshi Fujita	Submission (Armbar)	2	2:56
	Myung-Sik Kwak	def.	Yuichiro Ono	TKO (Punches)	1	0:22
	Kiyoshi Kuwabara	def.	Hae Yong Han	TKO (Punches)	1	1:28
	Hee Seung Kim	def.	Kazuyuki Yasuoka	TKO (Punches)	1	2:00
	Dong Young Lee	def.	Kiriro Mano	Submission (Rear-Naked Choke)	1	1:18
	Gyo Pyung Hwang	def.	Yamato Hamamatsu	KO (Punch)	1	0:10
	Se Joong Son	def.	Ji Hoon Jang	TKO (Punches)	2	2:10
	Dae-Myung Kim	def.	Il Jin Kwon	Decision (Unanimous)	2	5:00
	Jin Hyun Kim	def.	Jun Woo Kim	Submission (Rear-Naked Choke)	1	2:21

== M-1 Global - Mix Fight M-1 ==
M-1 Global - Mix Fight M-1 was an event held on May 21, 2011, at Orlyonok Sport Palace in Perm, Perm Krai, Russia.

=== Results ===
Main Card
Weight class				Method	Round	Time	Notes
	Mikhail Sysoev	def.	Samir Akhmetov	TKO	2	N/A
	Magomed Askhabaliyev	def.	Andrey Baratov	Submission	2	N/A
	Visampasha Mirzakhanov	def.	Abdul Mogomedov	KO	1	N/A
	Kamil Latipov	def.	Nikolay Oparin	2	N/A
	Ivan Lapin	def.	Ruslan Mustafaev	Decision (Unanimous)	2	5:00
	Evgeniy Lazukov	def.	Ashot Pashyan	TKO	1	N/A

== M-1 Global: M-1 Ukraine European Battle ==
M-1 Global: M-1 Ukraine European Battle was an event held on June 4, 2011, at National Circus of Ukraine in Kyiv, Ukraine.

=== Results ===
Main Card
Weight class				Method	Round	Time	Notes
	Yasubey Enomoto	def.	Rafal Moks	Decision (Majority)	3	5:00
	Yuri Ivlev	def.	Artiom Damkovsky	Decision (Unanimous)	3	5:00
	Khusein Khaliev	def.	Alexander Agafonov	Decision (Unanimous)	3	5:00
	Antun Racic	def.	Vugar Bakhshiev	Submission (Rear-Naked Choke)	3	3:54
	Alexander Dolotenko	def.	Filip Anasovich	Submission (Armbar)	1	1:15
	Vasily Novikov	def.	Alexander Nimerenko	Submission (Armbar)	2	3:10
	Vladimir Opanasenko	def.	Syanan Yusibov	Submission (Armbar)	1	0:41
	Serhiy Adamchuk	def.	Sergey Sinkevich	KO (Punch)	2	2:47
	Igor Zadernovsky	def.	Stepan Kostyuchenko	Submission (Armbar)	1	2:01
	Saparbek Safarov	def.	Igor Litoshik	TKO (Punches)	1	3:00
	Andrei Dryapko	def.	Ruslan Khaskhanov	TKO (Shoulder Injury)	1	1:57
	Vadim Khaitulov	def.	Viktor Talashov	TKO (Punch)	1	1:42
	Alexander Kozyr	def.	Semen Tyrlya	Submission (Armbar)	1	1:57
	Farkhad Fatalla	def.	Ilya Tiunov	Submission (Guillotine Choke)	1	1:48
	Victor Litvinov	def.	Evgeniy Klochok	Submission (Guillotine Choke)	1	2:57
	Alexander Bova	def.	Dmitriy Kozhukovsky	Decision (Unanimous)	3	3:00
	Andrei Shtefan	def.	Sergey Litvinov	Submission (Ankle Lock)	3	2:26
	Sergey Pavlyuk	def.	Vitaliy Dobrovolsky	TKO (Low Kick)	2	1:30

== M-1 Challenge 26: Garner vs. Bennett 2 ==
M-1 Challenge 26: Garner vs. Bennett 2 was an event held on July 8, 2011, at The Hangar at the O.C. Fair and Events Center in Costa Mesa, California, United States.

=== Results ===
Main Card
Weight class				Method	Round	Time	Notes
	Tyler Weathers	def.	Richard Schiller	Submission (Guillotine Choke)	1	2:37
	Kenny Garner	def.	Pat Bennett	KO (Punch)	2	1:15
	Artur Guseinov	def.	Tyson Jeffries	KO (Spinning Back Fist)	1	1:32
	Mairbek Taisumov	def.	Josh Bacallao	KO (Punch)	1	2:01
	Daniel Weichel	def.	Beau Baker	Decision (Unanimous)	3	5:00
	Eddie Arizmendi	def.	Jason Norwood	KO (Punch)	2	4:55
	Max Martyniouk	def.	Mike De Robles	TKO (Punches)	1	2:30
	Diman Morris	def.	Brandon Michaels	Decision (Split)	3	5:00

== M-1 Global: M-1 Fighter Tournament ==
M-1 Global: M-1 Fighter Tournament was an event held on August 6, 2011, at Saint Petersburg in Leningrad Oblast, Russia.

=== Results ===
Main Card
Weight class				Method	Round	Time	Notes
	Dmitriy Alferiev	def.	Timur Shikhmagomedov	TKO (Kick to the Body and Punches)	1	0:00
	Rustam Abdurapov	def.	Maxim Veshnyakov	TKO (Punches)	1	0:00
	Oleg Lvov	def.	Yuri Tchurov	Submission (Triangle Choke)	1	0:00
	Alexei Martynov	def.	Christian Vuapi	Submission (Rear-Naked Choke)	1	0:00
	Davrbek Isakov	def.	Albert Akhmedov	Submission (Triangle Choke)	1	0:00
	Radzhi Aliev	def.	Georgiy Kovalev	Decision (Unanimous)	2	5:00
	Alexei Pastirev	def.	Roman Trofimov	Decision (Unanimous)	2	5:00
	Pavel Vitruk	def.	Sanan Shahbudagov	Decision (Unanimous)	2	5:00

== M-1 Ukraine: King of Mixfight ==
M-1 Ukraine: King of Mixfight was an event held on September 15, 2011, at Crystal Hall in Kyiv, Ukraine.

=== Results ===
Main Card
Weight class				Method	Round	Time	Notes
	Anna Getmanenko	def.	Elena Muratova	Submission (Armbar)	1	2:03
	Victor Litvinov	vs.	Evgeni Babich	Draw	3	5:00
	Vasily Klepikov	def.	Evgeniy Garkusha	Submission (Rear-Naked Choke)	1	1:15
	Alexander Dolotenko	def.	Andrei Shtefan	Submission (Heel Hook)	1	1:22
	Vladimir Opanasenko	def.	Yaroslav Kochubinsky	Submission (Heel Hook)	1	3:21
	Alexander Kozyr	def.	Artem Perehristyuk	Submission (Heel Hook)	1	2:31
	Yuri Saakyan	def.	Alexey Naumov	Submission (Rear-Naked Choke)	3	0:00

== M-1 Belarus: Battle of Minsk ==
M-1 Belarus: Battle of Minsk was an event held on September 17, 2011, at Orion in Minsk, Belarus.

=== Results ===
Main Card
Weight class				Method	Round	Time	Notes
	Evgeniy Timanovskiy	def.	Aleksnader Denischik	Submission (Rear-Naked Choke)	2	2:16
	Alexei Khatsuk	def.	Denis Ivanets	Decision (Unanimous)	3	5:00
	Pavel Katrunov	def.	Andrei Dryapko	Submission (Rear-Naked Choke)	1	2:45
	Yuri Grigoryan	def.	Vitaly Lazovski	Decision (Unanimous)	3	5:00
	Maksim Soldatenko	def.	Alexander Gladky	Decision (Unanimous)	3	5:00
	Pavel Tretyakov	def.	Aleksander Chuduk	Decision (Unanimous)	3	5:00
	Oleg Nikolaenko	def.	Ilya Martisyuk	TKO (Corner Stoppage)	2	1:12
	Evgeniy Katser	def.	Ilya Gomalyuk	Decision (Unanimous)	3	5:00
	Arnold Vanyan	def.	Alexey Repalov	Submission (Rear-Naked Choke)	2	2:32
	Viktor Talashov	def.	Denis Larchenko	KO (Punch)	1	3:42
	Ivan Gladkiy	def.	Denis Bulovatskiy	Decision (Unanimous)	3	5:00

== M-1 Challenge 27: Magalhaes vs. Zayats ==
M-1 Challenge 27: Magalhaes vs. Zayats was an event held on October 14, 2011, at GCU Arena in Phoenix, Arizona, United States.

=== Results ===
Main Card
Weight class				Method	Round	Time	Notes
	Vinny Magalhaes	def.	Mikhail Zayats	TKO (Head Kick and Punches)	3	1:13
	Kenny Garner	def.	Maxim Grishin	Submission (Punches)	5	4:07
	Artur Guseinov	def.	Eddie Arizmendi	Submission (Heel Hook)	1	0:50
	Yasubey Enomoto	def.	Joshua Thorpe	Submission (Triangle Choke)	1	1:07
	Daniel Madrid	def.	Tom Gallicchio	Submission (Armbar)	1	0:48
	Michael Chavez	def.	Joe Martinez	Decision (Split)	3	5:00
	Ryan Crouch	def.	Frederick Lumpkin	TKO (Punches)	2	2:26

== M-1 Ukraine: Battle of Minsk ==
M-1 Ukraine: Battle of Minsk was an event held on October 15, 2011, at Minsk Sports Palace in Minsk, Belarus.

=== Results ===
Main Card
Weight class				Method	Round	Time	Notes
	Valeh Amiraliev	def.	Evgeniy Timanovskiy	TKO (Punches)	2	0:00
	Ruslan Nadzhafaliev	def.	Alexei Khatsuk	TKO (Punches)	1	0:00
	Pavel Katrunov	def.	Dzhavid Mammadov	Decision (Majority)	3	5:00
	Ilgar Sherifav	def.	Yuri Grigoryan	Submission (Rear-Naked Choke)	3	0:00
	Bahtiyar Arzumanov	def.	Maksim Soldatenko	Submission (Armbar)	1	1:16
	Igor Zadernovsky	def.	Timur Shamuradov	Submission (Heel Hook)	3	0:00
	Andrei Embolaev	def.	Roman Bagin	TKO (Punches)	1	0:00
	Alexander Dolotenko	def.	Zakhar Kucheryaviy	Submission (Armbar)	1	0:00
	Vadim Khaitulov	def.	Sergei Dzygansky	Submission (Rear-Naked Choke)	1	0:00
	Alexander Kozyr	def.	Aleksander Vitov	Decision (Unanimous)	3	5:00
	Vyacheslav Kostyuk	def.	Andrei Glushko	TKO (Punches)	1	0:00
	Vasily Novikov	def.	Alexey Smirnov	TKO (Punches)	1	0:00
	Vladimir Opanasenko	def.	Ilya Martisyuk	Submission (Heel Hook)	1	0:00
	Serhiy Adamchuk	def.	Yuri Saakyan	Decision (Unanimous)	2	5:00

== M-1 Challenge 28: Emelianenko vs. Malikov ==
M-1 Challenge 28: Emelianenko vs. Malikov was an event held on November 12, 2011, at Star Centre in Astrakhan, Russia.

=== Results ===
Main Card
Weight class				Method	Round	Time	Notes
	Magomed Malikov	def.	Alexander Emelianenko	KO (Punches)	1	0:23
	Isaiah Larson	def.	Alikhan Magomedov	Submission (Armbar)	2	3:41
	Vugar Bakhshiev	def.	Yves Landu	Decision (Unanimous)	3	5:00
	Gregory Babene	def.	Alexander Dolotenko	Technical Submission (Arm-Triangle Choke)	1	1:18
	Sunay Hamidov	def.	Alexei Martynov	Submission (Triangle Choke)	3	3:02
	Anatoly Tokov	def.	Jan Zdansky	TKO (Punches)	1	4:20
	Enoc Solves Torres	def.	Ruslan Khaskhanov	TKO (Punches)	1	4:00
	David Baudrier	def.	Anton Kostischin	Submission (Arm-Triangle Choke)	2	2:12

== M-1 Belarus 13: Belarus Fighting Championship ==
M-1 Belarus 13: Belarus Fighting Championship was an event held on November 12, 2011, at Orion Night Club in Minsk, Belarus.

=== Results ===
Main Card
Weight class				Method	Round	Time	Notes
	Sergey Korol	def.	Andrei Dryapko	Submission (Armbar)	2	0:00
	Evgeniy Katser	def.	Yuri Sherstyuk	Submission (Rear-Naked Choke)	1	4:30
	Oleg Golovin	def.	Arnold Vanyan	Submission (Heel Hook)	1	1:42
	Aleksnader Denischik	def.	Stepan Kostyuchenko	Decision (Unanimous)	3	5:00
	Alexei Gruzd	def.	Alexei Khatsuk	Decision (Unanimous)	2	5:00
	Sergei Taraskevich	def.	Alexei Gruzd	TKO (Punches)	1	0:32
	Aleksander Kravchenko	def.	Vitaliy Kostyuchik	Decision (Unanimous)	2	5:00
	Aleksander Kravchenko	def.	Pavel Nikolaenya	Submission (Rear-Naked Choke)	3	0:00
	Sergei Semizhon	def.	Evgenij Yanushko	TKO (Punches)	1	0:00
	Ivan Gladkiy	def.	Anton Graholsy	Submission (Rear-Naked Choke)	1	0:00

== M-1 Challenge 29: Samoilov vs. Miranda ==
M-1 Challenge 29: Samoilov vs. Miranda was an event held on November 19, 2011, at Ufa Arena in Ufa, Bashkortostan, Russia.

=== Results ===
Main Card
Weight class				Method	Round	Time	Notes
	Mario Miranda	def.	Dmitry Samoilov	Submission (Kimura)	2	3:58
	Artiom Damkovsky	def.	Antun Racic	KO (Slam)	1	2:16
	Arsen Temirkhanov	def.	Christian Eckerlin	Submission (Armbar)	1	2:31
	Erik Oganov	def.	Daniel Madrid	Submission (Heel Hook)	2	1:24
	Marat Gafurov	def.	Sheikh-Magomed Arapkhanov	Decision (Unanimous)	3	5:00
	Ramazan Emeev	def.	Ruslan Nadzhafaliev	Submission (Rear-Naked Choke)	2	2:50
	Julio Cesar de Almeida	def.	Bahtiyar Arzumanov	Decision (Unanimous)	3	5:00
	Denis Smoldarev	def.	Niyaz Safarov	Submission (Armbar)	1	2:10
	Akhmed Sultanov	def.	Vladimir Kuchenko	Submission (Triangle Choke)	1	3:10
	Denis Goltsov	def.	Teymur Aslanov	Submission (Triangle Choke)	1	1:55
	Denis Komkin	def.	Ruslan Stepanyan	KO (Punches)	1	1:34
	Mikhail Istomin	def.	Timur Shikhmagomedov	TKO (Knee to the Body and Punches)	2	0:24

== M-1 Global: Fedor vs. Monson ==
M-1 Global: Fedor vs. Monson was an event held on November 20, 2011, at Olympic Stadium in Moscow, Russia.

=== Results ===
Main Card
Weight class				Method	Round	Time	Notes
	Fedor Emelianenko	def.	Jeff Monson	Decision (Unanimous)	3	5:00
	Daniel Weichel	def.	Jose Figueroa	KO (Punches)	1	1:50
	Alexander Yakovlev	def.	Juan Manuel Suarez	TKO (Punches)	2	3:55
	Yuri Ivlev	def.	Jerome Bouisson	TKO (Punch)	1	1:00
	Mairbek Taisumov	def.	Joshua Thorpe	KO (Punches)	2	3:19
	Albert Duraev	def.	Xavier Foupa-Pokam	Submission (Triangle Choke)	2	2:37
	Alexander Volkov	def.	Arsen Abdulkerimov	TKO (Punches)	1	1:00
	Salim Daudov	def.	Sergey Kornev	Decision (Unanimous)	3	5:00
	Mikhail Malyutin	def.	Seydina Seck	KO (Punch)	1	0:47
	Nikolai Kaushansky	def.	Alexander Vinogradov	Submission (Rear-Naked Choke)	1	1:23

== M-1 Challenge 30: Zavurov vs. Enomoto ==
M-1 Challenge 30: Zavurov vs. Enomoto was an event held on December 9, 2011, at The Hangar in Costa Mesa, California, United States.

=== Results ===
Main Card
Weight class				Method	Round	Time	Notes
	Yasubey Enomoto	def.	Shamil Zavurov	Submission (Guillotine Choke)	5	4:10
	Artiom Damkovsky	def.	Jose Figueroa	KO (Punch)	1	2:19
	Alexander Sarnavskiy	def.	Sergio Cortez	Submission (Rear-Naked Choke)	1	1:46
	Tyson Jeffries	def.	Eddie Arizmendi	Submission (Brabo Choke)	2	2:08
	Bao Quach	def.	Alvin Cacdac	Submission (Triangle Armbar)	1	3:33
	Aaron Miller	def.	Paul Webb	Decision (Unanimous)	3	5:00

== M-1 Ukraine: Superfinal Grand Prix ==
M-1 Ukraine: Superfinal Grand Prix was an event held on December 17, 2011, at Acco International Exhibition Center in Kyiv, Ukraine.

=== Results ===
Main Card
Weight class				Method	Round	Time	Notes
	Igor Zadernovsky	def.	Vyacheslav Kostyuk	Submission (Heel Hook)	2	1:16
	Visampasha Mirzakhanov	def.	Vasily Klepikov	TKO (Punches)	2	0:00
	Alexander Dolotenko	def.	Renat Lyatifov	TKO (Retirement)	2	5:00
	Alexander Agafonov	def.	Vladimir Opanasenko	TKO (Doctor Stoppage)	1	3:22
	Vadim Khaitulov	def.	Serhiy Adamchuk	TKO (Corner Stoppage)	1	4:17
	Alexander Kozyr	def.	Aleksander Vitov	TKO (Punches)	3	0:00
	Bahtiyar Arzumanov	def.	Sergey Grechka	Submission (Armbar)	1	3:43
	Renat Gasanov	def.	Artem Perehristyuk	Submission (Armbar)	1	0:30
	Farkhad Fatalla	def.	Igor Kukharchuk	Submission (Guillotine Choke)	1	2:33
