= Yasubey Enomoto =

Swiss martial artist

- Born: 15 December 1983 (age 42); Zürich, Switzerland
- Nickname: The Swiss Samurai
- Height: 5 ft 11 in (180 cm)
- Weight: 169 lb (77 kg; 12 st 1 lb)
- Division: Welterweight, Middleweight
- Reach: 69 in (175 cm)
- Team: Enomoto Dojo
- Years active: 2004–

Mixed martial arts record
- Total: 38
- Wins: 22
- By knockout: 3
- By submission: 6
- By decision: 13
- Losses: 16
- By knockout: 5
- By submission: 1
- By decision: 10
- Draws: 0
- No contests: 0

Other information
- Notable club: Enomoto Dojo
- Mixed martial arts record from Sherdog

Yasubey Enomoto (born 15 December 1983) is a Swiss mixed martial artist competing in welterweight and middleweight categories. Finalist of prestige Sengoku Welterweight Grand Prix Tournament 2010, former champion of Russian organization M-1 Global and former KSW and ACA fighter.

== Biography ==
Yasubey Enomoto was born in Zürich in 1983 to a Peruvian father of Japanese origins and a Swiss mother.

He began training in martial arts at the age of six, choosing Shotokan karate. He has been practicing kung fu since the age of 16. During his studies, he became interested in Brazilian jiu-jitsu and Thai boxing. In 2006, he became the Swiss kickboxing champion, and in 2008, he became the world champion in the IKBO Thai boxing federation. He was the European grappling champion of the UGC federation, twice in the international German BJJ and grappling federation, and twice in the Swiss BJJ and grappling federation. His balance in Thai boxing is 7–2, in boxing 1–0, in the BJJ and grappling 90–8.

Together with his brother Felipe, they founded the Enomoto Dojo club in Zürich.

== Awards ==
=== Mixed martial arts ===
- 2010: Finalist of Sengoku Welterweight Grand Prix Tournament
- 2011–2012: M-1 Global Champion in Welterweight
- 2018: AMC Fight Nights Middleweight Championship Challenger

== Mixed martial arts record ==
Professional record breakdown
38 matches	22 wins	16 losses
By knockout	3	5
By submission	6	1
By decision	13	10

Res.	Record	Opponent	Method	Event	Date	Round	Time	Location	Notes
Loss	22–16	Makhmud Muradov	KO (knee and punches)	Oktagon 68	March 8, 2025	2	0:40	Stuttgart, Germany	
Loss	22–15	Kiamrian Abbasov	Decision (unanimous)	RCC 18	February 24, 2024	3	5:00	Tyumen, Russia	
Loss	22–14	Boris Medvedev	Decision (split)	RCC 12	August 26, 2023	3	5:00	Yekaterinburg, Russia	Welterweight bout.
Win	22–13	Arseniy Smirnov	Decision (split)	RCC 11	May 6, 2023	3	5:00	Yekaterinburg, Russia	
Loss	21–13	Mikhail Ragozin	Decision (unanimous)	RCC 10	December 18, 2021	3	5:00	Yekaterinburg, Russia	
Win	21–12	Sergei Martynov	Decision (unanimous)	RCC 8	December 19, 2020	3	5:00	Yekaterinburg, Russia	
Loss	20–12	Abubakar Vagaev	Decision (unanimous)	ACA 112	October 4, 2020	3	5:00	Grozny, Russia	
Win	20–11	Ivan Shtyrkov	Submission (rear-naked choke)	RCC 7	December 14, 2019	2	2:37	Yekaterinburg, Russia	Catchweight (187 lb) bout.
Win	19–11	Mikhail Ragozin	Decision (split)	RCC Intro 5	September 14, 2019	3	5:00	Yekaterinburg, Russia	
Loss	18–11	Roman Kopylov	KO (punch to the body)	Fight Nights Global 91	December 27, 2018	4	3:39	Moscow, Russia	Return to Middleweight. For the FNG Middleweight Championship.
Win	18–10	Alexey Ivanov	TKO (punches)	League S-70: Plotforma Cup 2018	August 22, 2018	2	3:54	Sochi, Russia	
Win	17–10	Shamil Amirov	KO (punches)	Fight Nights Global 74	March 11, 2017	3	4:01	Bratislava, Slovakia	
Loss	16–10	Aliaskhab Khizriev	Decision (unanimous)	Fight Nights Global 74	September 29, 2017	3	5:00	Moscow, Russia	
Loss	16–9	Nikolay Aleksakhin	TKO (retirement)	Fight Nights Global 61	March 11, 2017	2	1:19	Bryansk, Russia	
Win	16–8	Igor Svirid	Decision (unanimous)	ACB 50	December 10, 2016	3	5:00	Saint Petersburg, Russia	Middleweight bout.
Loss	15–8	Vladimir Mineev	Decision (unanimous)	Fight Nights Global 53: Day 2	October 8, 2016	3	5:00	Moscow, Russia	Catchweight (181 lb) bout.
Win	15–7	Stanislav Molodtsov	Decision (unanimous)	Fight Nights Global 48	May 26, 2016	3	5:00	Moscow, Russia	
Loss	14–7	Asłambek Saidow	Decision (unanimous)	KSW 34	March 5, 2016	3	5:00	Warsaw, Poland	
Win	14–6	Shamil Zavurov	Submission (guillotine choke)	WFCA 9	October 4, 2015	3	2:28	Grozny, Russia	
Win	13–6	Abubakar Vagaev	Decision (split)	WFCA 3	June 13, 2015	3	5:00	Grozny, Russia	Return to Welterweight.
Loss	12–6	Alexander Shlemenko	Decision (unanimous)	Fight Nights: Battle of Moscow 18	December 20, 2014	3	5:00	Moscow, Russia	Middleweight debut.
Win	12–5	Rustam Bogatirev	Decision (unanimous)	Modern Fighting Pankration: Battle of Empires 3	December 14, 2013	3	5:00	Khabarovsk, Russia	
Loss	11–5	Albert Tumenov	TKO (head kick and punches)	Fight Nights: Battle of Moscow 13	October 26, 2013	1	3:52	Moscow, Russia	
Win	11–4	Shamil Zavurov	Decision (unanimous)	Fight Nights: Battle of Moscow 12	June 20, 2013	3	5:00	Moscow, Russia	
Win	10–4	Khusein Khaliev	Decision (split)	M-1 Challenge 34	September 30, 2012	3	5:00	Moscow, Russia	
Loss	9–4	Rashid Magomedov	Decision (unanimous)	M-1 Challenge 31	March 16, 2012	5	5:00	Saint Petersburg, Russia	Lost the M-1 Global Welterweight Championship.
Win	9–3	Shamil Zavurov	Submission (guillotine choke)	M-1 Challenge 30	December 9, 2011	5	4:10	Costa Mesa, California, United States	Won the M-1 Global Welterweight Championship.
Win	8–3	Josh Thorpe	Submission (triangle choke)	M-1 Challenge 27	October 14, 2011	1	1:07	Phoenix, Arizona, United States	
Win	7–3	Rafał Moks	Decision (majority)	M-1 Global: European Battle	June 4, 2011	3	5:00	Kyiv, Ukraine	
Loss	6–3	Shamil Zavurov	Decision (unanimous)	M-1 Challenge 25	April 28, 2011	5	5:00	Saint Petersburg, Russia	For the M-1 Global Welterweight Championship.
Loss	6–2	Keita Nakamura	Submission (rear-naked choke)	World Victory Road Presents: Soul of Fight	December 30, 2010	2	3:48	Tokyo, Japan	2010 Sengoku Welterweight Grand Prix Final. For the inaugural Sengoku Welterweight Championship.
Win	6–1	Taisuke Okuno	Decision (unanimous)	World Victory Road Presents: Sengoku 15	October 30, 2010	3	5:00	Tokyo, Japan	2010 Sengoku Welterweight Grand Prix Semifinal.
Win	5–1	Kenta Takagi	Submission (bulldog choke)	World Victory Road Presents: Sengoku 13	August 22, 2010	2	0:53	Tokyo, Japan	2010 Sengoku Welterweight Grand Prix Quarterfinal.
Win	4–1	Sanae Kikuta	TKO (punches)	World Victory Road Presents: Sengoku 13	June 20, 2010	1	3:57	Tokyo, Japan	
Loss	3–1	Tyler Stinson	TKO (punches)	Art of Fighting 13	June 13, 2009	3	1:59	Sarasota, Florida, United States	
Win	3–0	Henrique Santana	Decision (unanimous)	Cage Fighters 5	March 7, 2009	2	5:00	Purfleet, England	
Win	2–0	Danny Doherty	Submission (armbar)	Hell Cage 1	May 3, 2008	2	N/A	Prague, Czech Republic	
Win	1–0	Vlajko Perovic	Decision (unanimous)	S-1: European Fight Night	February 18, 2006	2	5:00	Basel, Switzerland	Welterweight debut.

== Kickboxing record ==
Result	Record	Opponent	Method	Round	Time	Event	Date	Location	Notes
Loss	0-1	(Russia) Alexander Shlemenko	Decision (Unanimous)	3	3:00	REN TV: Shlemenko vs Enomoto	21.04.2023.	(Russia) Moscow	Kickboxing bout

- Unless otherwise cited, all records are retrieved from .
