= Alexander Emelianenko =

Russian mixed martial artist

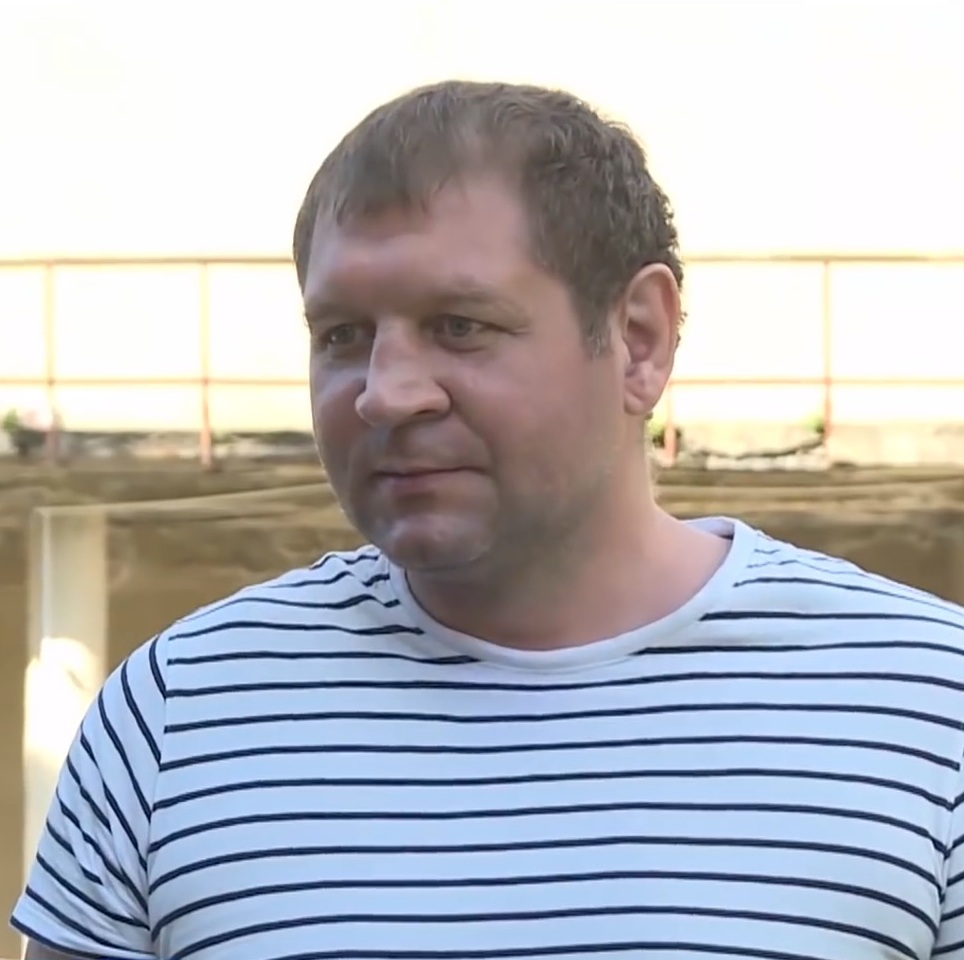
- Born: Aleksandr Vladimirovich Emelianenko; 2 August 1981 (age 45); Stary Oskol, Russian SFSR, Soviet Union
- Other names: The Grim Reaper
- Nationality: Russian
- Height: 6 ft 4 in (1.93 m)
- Weight: 256 lb (116 kg; 18 st 4 lb)
- Division: Heavyweight; Super Heavyweight
- Reach: 77 in (196 cm)
- Style: Sambo
- Fighting out of: Saint Petersburg, Russia
- Team: Red Devil Sport Club (2003–2009); AE Team (2009–2012); Akhmat Fight Club Chechnya (2017–present)
- Rank: Master of Sports in Judo; 1st Razryad Grand Master in Sambo
- Years active: 2003–2014, 2017–present

Professional boxing record
- Total: 2
- Wins: 1
- By knockout: 1
- Draws: 1

Mixed martial arts record
- Total: 39
- Wins: 29
- By knockout: 21
- By submission: 5
- By decision: 3
- Losses: 9
- By knockout: 5
- By submission: 4
- Draws: 1

Other information
- Spouse: Olga (m. 2007; div. 2011) Polina Seledtsova (m. 2015; div. 2018); (m. 2022)
- Children: 1
- Notable relatives: Fedor Emelianenko, brother
- Boxing record from BoxRec
- Mixed martial arts record from Sherdog
- Last updated on: 27 October 2013

Alexander Emelianenko
Medal record

Representing Russia

Men's Combat Sambo

World Combat Games
| Silver medal – second place | 2010 Beijing | +100 kg |

World Championships
| Gold medal – first place | 2006 Tashkent | +100 kg |
| Gold medal – first place | 2004 Prague | +100 kg |
| Gold medal – first place | 2003 Roquebrune-Cap-Martin | +100 kg |

European Championships
| Gold medal – first place | 1999 Sofia | +100 kg |

Russian Championships
| Silver medal – second place | 2012 Moscow | +100 kg |
| Gold medal – first place | 2010 Krasnokamsk | +100 kg |
| Gold medal – first place | 2006 St. Petersburg | +100 kg |
| Gold medal – first place | 2004 St. Petersburg | +100 kg |
| Gold medal – first place | 2003 Petrozavodsk | +100 kg |
| Gold medal – first place | 2003 St. Petersburg | +100 kg |

Alexander Vladimirovich Emelianenko (or Yemelianenko; Russian: Александр Владимирович Емельяненко, romanized: Aleksandr Vladimirovich Emel'janenko, IPA: [ɐlʲɪkˈsandr vlɐˈdʲimʲɪrəvʲɪtɕ jɪmʲɪˈlʲjænʲɪnkə]; born 2 August 1981) is a Russian professional mixed martial artist. He is a three-time Russian national Combat Sambo champion and three-time world Combat Sambo champion in the absolute division. He is a younger brother of Fedor Emelianenko.

== Background ==
Aleksander was born on 2 August 1981 in Stary Oskol, Soviet Union, into the family of a teacher, Olga Feodorovna Emelianenko, and a welder, Vladimir Alexanderovich Emelianenko. He is the third child in the family and has an older sister, Marina, an older brother, Fedor, and a younger brother, Ivan.

In his childhood, since his parents were working during the day, Aleksander spent a lot of time on the rough streets. During his early teens, he used to take part in street fights while his parents were working, going so far as being involved in a riot between neighborhoods.

Since his family did not have enough money, his mother used to prepare only a single meal for the entire week for Emelianenko and his brothers and he had to share clothing with his older brother.

Initially studying to become an electrician at the vocational school, Emelianenko finished his studies in 1999 as an electric welder after he was transferred several times to other technical specialties for bad behavior.

When he was a teenager, while his brother Fedor was in the Russian Army, his parents separated and, since then, Emelianenko has had a strained relationship with his father, with whom he rarely speaks.

== Martial arts training ==
Emelianenko started martial arts training at a very early age: his older brother, Fedor, often had to babysit him, and since Fedor did not want to miss his Sambo practice, he took young Alexander with him. At first, Emelianenko only observed the older kids, but soon he started mimicking their movements. He started his formal Sambo training when he joined elementary school, training with Vladimir Mihailovich Voronov.

Emelianenko would go on to practice Judo, Wrestling, and Boxing, and he also participated in other sports like Basketball and Football. At 16 years old, when he was in training school, his mother forbade him from training boxing but Emelianenko kept doing it in secret.

Also at 16 years old, Emelianenko became a Russian Master of Sport in judo.

In 1999, Emelianenko won the European Sambo championships.

In 2003 he won the World Combat Sambo championships and repeated this feat in 2004 and 2006.

In 2010, during 19–22 February, Emelianenko took part in the Russian Cup of Combat Sambo representing Saint Petersburg, winning the heavyweight tournament (his brother Fedor injured his hand during the tournament) and earning the right to represent Russia at the World Championships.

Emelianenko participated in sambo at Sportaccord Combat Games 2010 in Beijing, where he won the silver medal in the +100 kg category.

Emelianenko has famously said of his fighting prowess, "My punches are like electric trains, if I miss, my opponent would catch a cold."

== Mixed martial arts career ==
=== The Pride years ===
One of the youngest fighters to debut in Pride Fighting Championships at 22 years old, on 5 October 2003 at the event Pride Bushido 1, Emelianenko made his professional mixed martial arts (MMA) debut against Brazilian Assuério Silva, defeating Silva by split decision.

In his next fight on 31 December 2003, Emelianenko fought against Brazilian fighter Angelo Araujo at Inoki Bom-Ba-Ye 2003 Inoki Festival, defeating Araujo by TKO after Emelianenko cut Araujo above the right eye and the doctor stopped the fight.

At PRIDE Bushido 3 on 23 May 2004, Emelianenko defeated Australian Matt Foki via rear naked choke in the first round.

In his fourth professional fight, Emelianenko was defeated in the first round via KO (head kick) by Mirko Cro Cop, one of the top heavyweight contenders in MMA at the time, at Pride Final Conflict 2004 on 15 August 2004.

On 9 October 2004, Emelianenko rebounded with a victory over Brazilian Carlos "Carlão" Barreto by decision at M-1 MFC Middleweight GP, the first time that Emelianenko fought outside Japan.

Returning to Pride, on 31 October 2004 at Pride 28 Emelianenko knocked out English brawler James Thompson in eleven seconds, Emelianenko's shortest fight to date.

In his second shortest fight, Emelianenko defeated Brazilian Ricardo Morais by KO (punches) in fifteen seconds on 3 April 2005 at Pride Bushido 6. Emelianenko has commented that he broke one of his hands while punching Morais.

In his third consecutive KO victory, on 9 October 2005 Emelianenko defeated Dutch kickboxer Rene Rooze in 28 second with a brutal knockout that left Rooze unconscious for some minutes at Bushido Rotterdam Rumble in the Netherlands.

At Pride Shockwave 2005 on 31 December 2005, Emelianenko submitted 1996 gold medalist judoka Pawel Nastula with a rear naked choke in the first round.

In Emelianenko's second professional loss, on 5 May 2006 at the event Pride Total Elimination Absolute, during the second round of Pride 2006 Openweight Grand Prix, King of Pancrase Josh Barnett just defeated Emelianenko with a keylock, after Emelianenko slipped and Barnett took advantage off this in the final seconds off the last round. Emelianenko dominated the entire fight well on his way to a decision victory moving on to the next round off the tournament. Emelianenko used his brutal striking exchanges during the first round and broke Barnett's nose. Official doctors claimed that Emelianenko had fever and sickness before the fight, with the doctors advising him not to fight that night, which he ignored because it was the Openweight Grand Prix, the most important competition at the time.

In his last fight in Pride, Emelianenko defeated former teammate and fellow Russian Sergei Kharitonov via TKO in a back and forth match which ended in the first round after Emelianenko punched and kneed Kharitonov relentlessly on the ground, forcing the referee to stop the fight at Pride Final Conflict Absolute on 10 September 2006.

=== After Pride ===
Two months after his last fight, on 12 November 2006 at the event 2 Hot 2 Handle: Pride & Honor in Rotterdam, Emelianenko faced Brazilian Jiu-jitsu specialist Fabrício Werdum, who defeated Emelianenko in the first round via submission (arm triangle choke). In an interview with Sherdog, Emelianenko stated that he did not train at all for the Werdum fight as his original opponent was not going to be Werdum, and he would like a rematch with him.

On 14 April 2007 at Bodog Fight Series II: Clash of the Nations, Emelianenko fought once again in Russia, knocking out American Eric Pele with punches in the first round, the first time that Pele was knocked out in his career.

In his next match, Emelianenko faced Dutch Jessie Gibbs (called Gibson at the time), who was a late replacement for Gilbert Yvel. Emelianenko defeated Gibbs with a kimura submission in the first round at M-1 Mix Fight Championship: Russia vs Europe on 21 July 2007.

Fighting for the first time in North America and originally scheduled to fight Wesley Correira, Emelianenko defeated American super heavyweight Dan Bobish via submission (guillotine choke) in the first round on 19 October 2007 at Hardcore Championship Fighting: Title Wave in Calgary. This was Bobish's last professional bout as he injured his back in the fight and refused to have surgery.

Returning to Saint Petersburg, on 3 April 2008, Emelianenko fought Brazilian Silvao Santos, defeating Santos by TKO (punch) at M-1 Challenge 2.

=== Affliction controversy ===
Emelianenko was signed to make his United States debut at Affliction: Banned on 19 July 2008. But at the weigh-ins for the event, it was announced that Emelianenko was unable to meet the licensing standards of the California State Athletic Commission (CSAC). Emelianenko was replaced by Gary Goodridge.

Emelianenko denied the rumors of testing positive for hepatitis B, commenting that he was unable to compete because he was late for his medical exam, having arrived two days after the scheduled date due to visa issues. Due to the health and privacy rules in California, the CSAC was not allowed to comment on why Emelianenko was denied a license, but a member of the CSAC stated on a radio show that Emelianenko was not and would not be cleared in California, and that this would stand for all of the United States of America.

Emelianenko was expected to appear at an upcoming Affliction event (Affliction: Day of Reckoning) on 11 October 2008 but was removed from the plan due to still having licensing problems in August 2008.

=== After Affliction ===
Returning to Europe, on 21 November 2008 at M-1 Global's event M-1 Challenge 9 in Saint Petersburg, Emelianenko defeated South Korean Sang Soo Lee via KO (punches) in the first round.

Emelianenko left Red Devil Sport Club on 3 March 2009.

At the event ProFC 5: Russia vs. Europe on 29 March 2009, Emelianenko defeated fellow Russian Ibragim Magomedov by TKO in 51 seconds, after Magomedov was close to knocking Emelianenko out but, in the punching exchange, Emelianenko managed to cut Magomedov near his right eye, which prompted the referee to stop the fight after the ring doctor checked the injury.

Emelianenko was slated to compete on 29 September 2009 in South Korea at the event Fighting Mixed Combative 2 against Bulgarian Sambo practitioner Blagoi Ivanov, who had defeated Emelianenko's brother Fedor in the 2008 World Sambo Championships, but Ivanov injured his hands in a previous match against Kazuyuki Fujita, which left the event date in the air, so Emelianenko decided to withdraw from the event altogether.

After a year without professional MMA matches, Emelianenko's next fight was on 23 April 2010 at ProFC: Commonwealth Cup against Swedish wrestler Eddy Bengtsson. The fight ended in under a minute as Bengtsson appeared to fake being knocked unconscious from a light punch. Emelianenko founded his own training team, AE Team, which he started to present in his fight against Bengtsson.

A month later, on 22 May 2010 at the event Azerbaijan vs. Europe organized with the support of the Azerbaijan Pankration Federation (APF) and held in Baku, Emelianenko defeated Serbian fighter Miodrag Petkovic by TKO (punches) in the first round.

=== KSW controversy ===
During July 2010, Emelianenko was in talks with Polish promotion KSW (Konfrontacja Sztuk Walki) for a possible match up against strongman Mariusz Pudzianowski and reached a verbal agreement. But on 3 August 2010 KSW co-owner Maciej Kawulski stated in a Polsat News interview that Emelianenko would likely not fight in KSW, claiming that Emelianenko had hepatitis C. Emelianenko denied this and demanded an apology from KSW. During the controversy, a previous opponent of Emelianenko claimed that he believed that Emelianenko had hepatitis B, not C.

On 10 August 2010, Polish MMA promotion Strefa Walk decided to make public the results of medical tests reportedly taken by Emelianenko, which purportedly showed that he did not have any form of viral hepatitis and thus was fit to fight for the promotion. There has not since been independent verification of the tests results or recognition of the results by independent licensing agencies.

=== Strefa Walk ===
After the controversy, Strefa Walk announced a fight between Emelianenko and Strikeforce champion Alistair Overeem, which Bas Boon, head of Golden Glory, confirmed to a Polish MMA website that it was in negotiations, but a few days later Overeem announced on Twitter that he was not going to fight Emelianenko.

On 19 October 2010, Strefa Walk held a press conference in which it was officially announced that Emelianenko would face Austrian fighter Chris Mahle in the main event of Strefa Walk M&W: Emelianenko vs Mahle in Łódź, Poland on 19 November 2010. On 17 November 2010 Strefa Walk announced that the date of the bout of Emelianenko's bout with Mahle was changed to 25 February 2011.

Before his fight with Mahle, Emelianenko faced Australian kickboxer Peter Graham on 18 December 2010, being defeated by Graham via TKO in the second round after Graham connected several leg kicks that rendered Emelianenko unable to continue the fight.

On 10 February 2011 it was announced that Emelianenko's bout with Mahle was postponed to an unspecified later date due to the injury that Emelianenko received during his fight with Peter Graham.

Emelianenko faced Magomed Malikov at M-1 Challenge XXVIII on 12 November 2011, in Astrakhan, Russia. Emelianenko lost the fight via first-round KO.

Alexander Emelianenko fought Tadas Rimkevicius at M-1 Challenge 31 in St. Petersburg, Russia. Emelianenko won the fight via TKO (punches) at 1:52 of round 2.

In his final match, Emelianenko submitted to a north–south choke from American grappler Jeff Monson in the second round of their contest at M-1 Challenge 35: Emelianenko vs. Monson at the Ice Palace in Saint Petersburg on 15 November 2012. He announced his retirement from MMA competition through an open letter to his fans on 18 December 2012, citing a chronic injury and a lack of time for his family as contributing factors in his decision.

About three months after announcing his retirement, Emelianenko announced that he is making a comeback into MMA with ProFC. His first match since retirement however was at the Legend Fighting Show against American MMA superstar Bob Sapp on 25 May 2013, in Moscow. Alexander defeated Bob Sapp by TKO in Round 1.

Alexander was expected to fight Darrill Schoonover on 25 August at the ProFC 50 event in Rostov-on-Don in Russia, but withdrew due to a knee injury. In a video released on the ProFC website, Emelianenko said that he hoped to go ahead with the much-anticipated rematch with Mirko Cro Cop scheduled for November under the Legend Fighting Show banner.

=== MMA return ===
On 24 November 2016, Emelianenko was released from prison.

After his release, he signed a contract with the Akhmat Fighting Club for several fights. Alexander had his first fight on 27 September 2017, as part of the WFCA 42 tournament against Brazilian Geronimo dos Santos. Alexander knocked out his opponent as early as 36 seconds of the first round. Two more victories followed: in December over American Virgil Zwicker at "WFCA 44" and in March 2018 over Pole Szymon Bayor at "Battle of the Volga". Both fights, as well as with the Brazilian, ended with a technical knockout in the first round. Afterwards, Emelianenko signed a contract with the "RCC", in which he fought in parallel with the "WFCA". Under the auspices of the Ural promotion he held 2 fights in Yekaterinburg, which became the main fights of the evening. On 5 May 2018, at RCC 2 he defeated Brazilian Gabriel Gonzaga. n 9 July 2018, at the next tournament, RCC 3, he was stronger than Czech Viktor Pešta. In both fights, Emelianenko managed to knock out his opponents in the second round. On 18 August, during the WFCA 50th Akhmat League jubilee tournament in Moscow, Emelianenko faced American Tony Johnson in the main event. The fight ended in a draw (29:28 (Johnson), 29:29, 29:29) by split decision of the judges. On 15 December 2018, Emelianenko was scheduled to fight Brazilian Francimar Barroso at the RCC 5 in Ekaterinburg. However, in early March 2019 Emelianenko was detained after crashing into two cars while fleeing police and driving under the influence, leading his upcoming bout canceled. Emelianenko was scheduled to fight another Brazilian, Wagner Prado, at the next tournament, RCC 6 on 4 May 2019, in Chelyabinsk. But because of the incident in Kislovodsk this fight was also cancelled. Later the league cancelled the contract with Alexander. On 10 May 2019, Emelianenko was agreed to fight in the GFC promotion with another Brazilian, Luiz Henrique, which, like the previous two fights, did not take place because of the Russian. This time the reason for Emelianenko's withdrawal was a fall from his bike. On the YouTube channel Sport24's "HukVam" program, Alexander Emelianenko and Magomed Ismailov agreed by phone to fight. On 28 December 2019, the ACA promotion officially announced their heavyweight bout, which was scheduled to take place in Moscow on 3 April 2020, at ACA 107: Emelianenko vs. Ismailov. However, due to restrictive measures in the capital due to the coronavirus epidemic, the tournament was postponed to 24 July 2020. It later became known that it would not be held in Moscow, but in Sochi. The three-round bout was dominated by Ismailov and ended with the latter winning by technical knockout in the last five minutes.

Emelianenko, as a replacement for Vyacheslav Vasilevsky, faced Márcio Santos was slated to serve as the event headliner at AMC Fight Nights 106. He lost the bout via arm-triangle choke in the first round.

16 December 2022 Emelianenko fought with a Russian video blogger Svyatoslav Kovalenko. Fight took place within the "Ren TV Fight Club" tournament. Emelianenko lost the fight via split decision.

== Boxing career ==
On 3 October 2009, Emelianenko made his professional boxing debut against Khizir Pliev, an army boxing champion from Ingushetia who was also making his professional debut, in a fight that ended in a draw.

On 25 September 2022, Aleksander Emelianenko was knocked out in 13 seconds by Viacheslav Datsik in Moscow at a Hardcore Boxing event.

== Personal life ==
In his hometown of Stary Oskol, Emelianenko regularly trained with his brother Fedor.

In 2003, Emelianenko moved to Saint Petersburg, where he met his future wife Olga, whom he married on 4 September 2004. The couple had one daughter together, born in 2007, and shared another daughter from Olga's previous relationship. They divorced in 2011.

He became a member of Red Devil Sport Club after he and his brother Fedor left Russian Top Team, but he subsequently had a falling out with Red Devil Sport Club's and Fedor's manager Vadim Finkelstein.

In an interview published on 21 March 2008, his brother Fedor, in response to a direct question, confirmed that Alexander had spent time in prison, having been sentenced to five years but only serving three and a half. Alexander, however, denied this, including in an interview published on 5 December 2008 in the same publication where his brother commented about the issue. Some commentators have expressed doubt regarding Emelianenko's alleged prison time, citing Japan's strict immigration policy against admitting convicted felons, which normally would have forbidden him to fight in Japan, while others point out that some of his tattoos are an indication that he spent some time in prison.

In 2003, Emelianenko enrolled in Belgorod State University, from which he graduated in 2009 with a bachelor's degree.

Emelianenko has several tattoos, which he collects as a hobby. In a controversy apparently sparked by his tattoos, he was accused by NTV on 20 March 2010 of being a Russian nationalist like Roman Zentsov, which Emelianenko quickly denied, stating that he was only engaged in the development of MMA in his country, with no political motivations, especially for extremist groups.

He enjoys hunting and claims to have killed a bear by piercing its throat with a bear spear and then stabbing it in the heart with a knife, a traditional way of Russian bear hunting.

After the Russo-Georgian War, he went to South Ossetia to train in preparation for his bout against Sang Soo Lee, in a sign of solidarity with the Ossetian people.

In 2015, Emelianenko married his second wife, Polina Seledtsova. They divorced in 2018 but reunited in 2022.

== Television appearances ==
Emelianenko has appeared on a Korean comedy show and Russia Channel One's show Big Races, on which he lost two teeth in a competition against a bull in 2010.

Emelianenko played one of the protagonists, alongside fellow MMA fighter Julia Berezikova and other Russian athletes, in the 2010 Russian series Olympic Village, starring Yevgeni Sidikhin.

== Sexual assault conviction ==
Emelianenko was accused of assaulting and raping his former housekeeper Polina Stepanova on 2 May 2014, as well as stealing her passport. Emelianenko pleaded not guilty and claimed the sex was consensual. Prosecutors asked for five years in prison for Emelianenko. On 19 May 2015, Emelianenko was found guilty of sexual assault and sentenced to four-and-a-half years in prison and a 50,000-ruble (USD $1000) fine. On 20 May 2015, his promoter Oleg Rajewski stated that he would appeal the decision. On 24 September 2015, the appeal was declined.

While in prison, Emelianenko married his second wife, Polina Seledtsova. He was released on parole in October 2016 and returned to MMA competition in 2017.

== Championships and accomplishments ==
=== Mixed martial arts ===
- Professional Fighting Championships
  - ProFC Heavyweight Championship (One time)

=== Sambo ===
- SportAccord
  - 2010 SportAccord World Combat Games Combat Sambo Silver Medalist
- Fédération Internationale Amateur de Sambo
  - 2006 FIAS World Combat Sambo Championships Gold Medalist
  - 2004 FIAS World Combat Sambo Championships Gold Medalist
  - 2003 FIAS World Combat Sambo Championships Gold Medalist
  - 1999 European Championships Sport Sambo Gold Medalist
- All-Russia Sambo Federation
  - Russian Combat Sambo National Championship (2003, 2004, 2006, 2010)
  - Russian Combat Sambo National Championship Runner-up (2012)
- Combat Sambo Federation of Russia
  - Russian Combat Sambo National Championship (2003)
  - 2004 Dagestan Open Combat Sambo Silver Medalist
  - 2003 Union of Heroes Cup Combat Sambo Silver Medalist
  - 2003 Moscow Open Combat Sambo Silver Medalist

== Mixed martial arts record ==
Professional record breakdown
| 39 matches | 29 wins | 9 losses |
| By knockout | 21 | 5 |
| By submission | 5 | 4 |
| By decision | 3 | 0 |
| Draws | 1 | |

| Res. | Record | Opponent | Method | Event | Date | Round | Time | Location | Notes |
|---|---|---|---|---|---|---|---|---|---|
| Win | 29–9–1 | Alexey Goncharov | TKO (punches) | National Fight League 2 | 21 December 2024 | 1 | 0:37 | Magas, Russia | |
| Loss | 28–9–1 | Márcio Santos | Submission (arm-triangle choke) | AMC Fight Nights 106 | 27 November 2021 | 1 | 3:58 | Syktyvkar, Russia | |
| Loss | 28–8–1 | Magomed Ismailov | TKO (punches) | ACA 107 | 24 July 2020 | 3 | 3:25 | Sochi, Russia | |
| Draw | 28–7–1 | Tony Johnson | Draw (majority) | WFCA 50 | 18 August 2018 | 3 | 5:00 | Moscow, Russia | |
| Win | 28–7 | Viktor Pešta | TKO (punches) | RCC 3 | 9 July 2018 | 2 | 3:52 | Yekaterinburg, Russia | |
| Win | 27–7 | Gabriel Gonzaga | TKO (punches and knees) | RCC 2 | 5 May 2018 | 2 | 3:43 | Yekaterinburg, Russia | |
| Win | 26–7 | Szymon Bajor | TKO (punches) | Samara MMA Federation: Battle on Volga 3 | 4 March 2018 | 1 | 3:03 | Tolyatti, Russia | |
| Win | 25–7 | Virgil Zwicker | TKO (punches) | WFCA 44 | 17 December 2017 | 1 | 2:56 | Grozny, Russia | |
| Win | 24–7 | Gerônimo dos Santos | TKO (punches) | WFCA 42 | 27 September 2017 | 1 | 0:36 | Moscow, Russia | |
| Loss | 23–7 | Dmitriy Sosnovskiy | TKO (punches) | Coliseum FC: New History 2 | 25 January 2014 | 1 | 1:43 | Saint Petersburg, Russia | |
| Win | 23–6 | Jose Rodrigo Guelke | TKO (punches) | ProFC 49 | 4 June 2013 | 1 | 4:10 | Moscow, Russia | |
| Win | 22–6 | Bob Sapp | TKO (punches) | Legend Fighting Show 1 | 25 May 2013 | 1 | 1:18 | Moscow, Russia | |
| Loss | 21–6 | Jeff Monson | Submission (north-south choke) | M-1 Challenge 35 | 15 November 2012 | 2 | 3:17 | Saint Petersburg, Russia | |
| Win | 21–5 | Konstantin Gluhov | Decision (unanimous) | M-1 Challenge 34 | 30 September 2012 | 3 | 5:00 | Moscow, Russia | |
| Win | 20–5 | Ibragim Magomedov | TKO (doctor stoppage) | M-1 Challenge 33 | 6 June 2012 | 2 | 5:00 | Dzheyrakh, Russia | |
| Win | 19–5 | Tadas Rimkevicius | TKO (punches) | M-1 Challenge 31 | 16 March 2012 | 2 | 1:52 | Saint Petersburg, Russia | |
| Win | 18–5 | Tolegen Akylbekov | Submission (kimura) | Bushido Lithuania: Vol. 50 | 21 December 2011 | 1 | 4:32 | Almaty, Kazakhstan | |
| Loss | 17–5 | Magomed Malikov | KO (punches) | M-1 Challenge 28 | 12 November 2011 | 1 | 0:23 | Astrakhan, Russia | |
| Loss | 17–4 | Peter Graham | TKO (leg kicks) | Draka MMA: Governor's Cup 5 | 18 December 2010 | 2 | 2:59 | Khabarovsk, Russia | |
| Win | 17–3 | Miodrag Petkovic | TKO (punches) | Azerbaijan Pankration Federation: Azerbaijan vs. Europe | 22 May 2010 | 1 | 3:00 | Baku, Azerbaijan | |
| Win | 16–3 | Eddy Bengtsson | TKO (punch) | ProFC 15 | 23 April 2010 | 1 | 0:40 | Moscow, Russia | |
| Win | 15–3 | Ibragim Magomedov | TKO (punches) | ProFC 5 | 29 March 2009 | 1 | 0:51 | Rostov-on-Don, Russia | |
| Win | 14–3 | Lee Sang-soo | TKO (punches) | M-1 Challenge 9 | 21 November 2008 | 1 | 2:40 | Saint Petersburg, Russia | |
| Win | 13–3 | Silvao Santos | TKO (punches) | M-1 Challenge 2 | 3 April 2008 | 1 | 1:34 | Saint Petersburg, Russia | |
| Win | 12–3 | Dan Bobish | Submission (guillotine choke) | Hardcore CF: Title Wave | 19 October 2007 | 1 | 1:09 | Calgary, Alberta, Canada | |
| Win | 11–3 | Jessie Gibbs | Submission (kimura) | M-1: Battle on the Neva | 21 July 2007 | 1 | 3:37 | Saint Petersburg, Russia | |
| Win | 10–3 | Eric Pele | KO (punches) | BodogFight: Clash of the Nations 2007 | 14 April 2007 | 1 | 4:07 | Saint Petersburg, Russia | |
| Loss | 9–3 | Fabrício Werdum | Submission (arm-triangle choke) | 2 Hot 2 Handle: Pride and Honor | 12 November 2006 | 1 | 3:24 | Rotterdam, Netherlands | |
| Win | 9–2 | Sergei Kharitonov | TKO (punches and knee) | Pride Final Conflict Absolute | 10 September 2006 | 1 | 6:45 | Saitama, Japan | 2006 Pride Heavyweight Grand Prix Reserve bout. |
| Loss | 8–2 | Josh Barnett | Submission (keylock) | Pride Total Elimination Absolute | 5 May 2006 | 2 | 1:57 | Osaka, Japan | 2006 Pride Heavyweight Grand Prix Opening round. |
| Win | 8–1 | Pawel Nastula | Submission (neck crank) | Pride Shockwave 2005 | 31 December 2005 | 1 | 8:45 | Saitama, Japan | |
| Win | 7–1 | Rene Rooze | TKO (knee and punches) | Bushido Europe: Rotterdam Rumble | 9 October 2005 | 1 | 0:28 | Rotterdam, Netherlands | |
| Win | 6–1 | Ricardo Morais | KO (punches) | Pride Bushido 6 | 3 April 2005 | 1 | 0:15 | Yokohama, Japan | |
| Win | 5–1 | James Thompson | KO (punch) | Pride 28 | 31 October 2004 | 1 | 0:11 | Saitama, Japan | |
| Win | 4–1 | Carlos Barreto | Decision (unanimous) | M-1: Heavyweight Grand Prix 2004 | 9 October 2004 | 3 | 5:00 | Saint Petersburg, Russia | |
| Loss | 3–1 | Mirko Filipović | KO (head kick and punches) | Pride Final Conflict 2004 | 15 August 2004 | 1 | 2:09 | Saitama, Japan | |
| Win | 3–0 | Matt Foki | Submission (rear-naked choke) | Pride Bushido 3 | 23 May 2004 | 1 | 3:16 | Yokohama, Japan | |
| Win | 2–0 | Angelo Araujo | TKO (doctor stoppage) | Inoki Bom-Ba-Ye 2003 | 31 December 2003 | 2 | 4:28 | Kobe, Japan | |
| Win | 1–0 | Assuério Silva | Decision (split) | Pride Bushido 1 | 5 October 2003 | 2 | 5:00 | Saitama, Japan | Heavyweight debut. |

== Professional boxing record ==
| 3 fights | 1 win | 1 loss |
|---|---|---|
| By knockout | 1 | 1 |
| Draws | 1 | |

| No. | Result | Record | Opponent | Type | Round, time | Date | Location | Notes |
|---|---|---|---|---|---|---|---|---|
| 3 | Loss | 1–1–1 | (Russia) Viacheslav Datsik | KO | 1 (4) | 25 September 2022 | CSKA Arena, Moscow, Russia | |
| 2 | Win | 1–0–1 | (Russia) Mikhail Koklyaev | TKO | 1 (4) | 29 November 2019 | VTB Arena, Moscow, Russia | |
| 1 | Draw | 0–0–1 | (Russia) Khizir Pliev | MD | 4 | 3 October 2009 | Russian State University of Physical Culture, Moscow, Russia | |

== Bare-knuckle boxing record ==
Professional record breakdown
| 1 match | 1 win | 0 losses |
| By decision | 1 | 0 |

| Res. | Record | Opponent | Method | Event | Date | Round | Time | Location | Notes |
|---|---|---|---|---|---|---|---|---|---|
| Win | 1–0 | (United States) Jeff Monson | Decision (unanimous) | Hardcore FC: Russia vs. USA | 23 February 2022 | 3 | 3:00 | Moscow, Russia | |

== See also ==
- List of mixed martial artists with professional boxing records
