= 2006 World Sambo Championships =

Sambo competitions

- Location: Sofia, Bulgaria
- Dates: 3–5 November

The 2006 World Sambo Championships were held in Sofia, Bulgaria on November 3 to 5 for men's and women's Sambo, and the 2006 Combat Sambo championships were held in Tashkent, Uzbekistan on September 30 to October 2

== Medal overview ==
=== Combat Sambo Events ===
| Event | Gold | Silver | Bronze |
|---|---|---|---|
| Half-flyweight (52 kg) | Bair Vanzilov (RUS) | Olimov Otabek (UZB) | Andrey Zinchuk (UKR) |
| Half-flyweight (52 kg) | Bair Vanzilov (RUS) | Olimov Otabek (UZB) | Vahe Otarjan (ARM) |
| Flyweight (57 kg) | Orhonbaatar Soninhuu (MGL) | Kodir Sultanov (UZB) | Denis Panin (RUS) |
| Flyweight (57 kg) | Orhonbaatar Soninhuu (MGL) | Kodir Sultanov (UZB) | Cholpon Baiterekov (KGZ) |
| Half-lightweight (62 kg) | Dimitriy Simanov (RUS) | Ulan Eraliev (KGZ) | Erkebulan Shaihov (KAZ) |
| Half-lightweight (62 kg) | Dimitriy Simanov (RUS) | Ulan Eraliev (KGZ) | Alizon Rahimov (UZB) |
| Lightweight (68 kg) | Igor Isaikin (RUS) | Temur Muhabbatov (TJK) | Roman Bramontov (KAZ) |
| Lightweight (68 kg) | Igor Isaikin (RUS) | Temur Muhabbatov (TJK) | Alizon Rahimov (UZB) |
| Welterweight (74 kg) | Damba Radnaev (RUS) | Sunnat Iliasov (UZB) | Erlan Kelimbetov (KAZ) |
| Welterweight (74 kg) | Damba Radnaev (RUS) | Sunnat Iliasov (UZB) | Nurlan Azimbaev (KGZ) |
| Half-middleweight (82 kg) | Aleksey Gagarin (RUS) | Izuru Takeuchi (JPN) | David Grigoryan (UKR) |
| Half-middleweight (82 kg) | Aleksey Gagarin (RUS) | Izuru Takeuchi (JPN) | Saiaush Kasabaev (KAZ) |
| Middleweight (90 kg) | Eldor Gliamov (UZB) | Vladimir Damdinov (RUS) | Sergei Kotin (KAZ) |
| Middleweight (90 kg) | Eldor Gliamov (UZB) | Vladimir Damdinov (RUS) | Arturas Pranskiavichus (LTU) |
| Half-heavyweight (100 kg) | Dmitiri Zabolotnyi (KGZ) | Aleksander Garkushenko (RUS) | Konstantin Rishkov (UKR) |
| Half-heavyweight (100 kg) | Dmitiri Zabolotnyi (KGZ) | Aleksander Garkushenko (RUS) | Nurmatov Tureunmurat (UZB) |
| Heavyweight (100+ kg) | Aleksander Emelianenko (RUS) | Samad Rustamov (UZB) | Yancho Dimitrov (BUL) |
| Heavyweight (100+ kg) | Aleksander Emelianenko (RUS) | Samad Rustamov (UZB) | Vladimir Bezegev (UKR) |

=== Men's Sambo Events ===
| Event | Gold | Silver | Bronze |
|---|---|---|---|
| Half-flyweight (52 kg) | Denis Cherentzov (RUS) | Birles Yessengaliyev (KAZ) | Ushangi Kuzanashvili (GEO) |
| Half-flyweight (52 kg) | Denis Cherentzov (RUS) | Birles Yessengaliyev (KAZ) | Konstantin Tabakov (BUL) |
| Flyweight (57 kg) | Timur Gallymov (RUS) | Evgeny Genov (BUL) | Yerlan Tazhikov (KAZ) |
| Flyweight (57 kg) | Timur Gallymov (RUS) | Evgeny Genov (BUL) | Avtandil Tzintzadze (GEO) |
| Half-lightweight (62 kg) | Vitaly Sergeev (RUS) | Kostadin Topalov (BUL) | Aidar KairBayev (KAZ) |
| Half-lightweight (62 kg) | Vitaly Sergeev (RUS) | Kostadin Topalov (BUL) | Abdulfayz Mulloev (TJK) |
| Lightweight (68 kg) | Dimitri Bazaylev (BLR) | Dmitriy Babiychuk (UKR) | Denis Muchin (RUS) |
| Lightweight (68 kg) | Dimitri Bazaylev (BLR) | Dmitriy Babiychuk (UKR) | Stefan Shopov (BUL) |
| Low-middleweight (74 kg) | Georgi Georgiev (BUL) | Timur Rachmatulaev (ISR) | David Shengelya (GEO) |
| Low-middleweight (74 kg) | Georgi Georgiev (BUL) | Timur Rachmatulaev (ISR) | Carlos Ochoa (VEN) |
| Half-middleweight (82 kg) | Rais Rakhmatullin (RUS) | Ivan Vaslchuk (UKR) | Niko Kutsia (GEO) |
| Half-middleweight (82 kg) | Rais Rakhmatullin (RUS) | Ivan Vaslchuk (UKR) | Leart Avagyan (ARM) |
| Middleweight (90 kg) | Mindya Bodaveli (GEO) | Alsim Chernoskulov (RUS) | Poludjona Saihova (TJK) |
| Middleweight (90 kg) | Mindya Bodaveli (GEO) | Alsim Chernoskulov (RUS) | Yaugen Siomachkin (BLR) |
| Half-heavyweight (100 kg) | Kyrylo Volovik (UKR) | Yuriy Alikin (RUS) | Blagoi Ivanov (BUL) |
| Half-heavyweight (100 kg) | Kyrylo Volovik (UKR) | Yuriy Alikin (RUS) | Syarhei Kukharenka (BLR) |
| Heavyweight (100+ kg) | Murat Hasanov (RUS) | Arman Abeubov (KAZ) | Zviad Chinchiladze (GEO) |
| Heavyweight (100+ kg) | Murat Hasanov (RUS) | Arman Abeubov (KAZ) | Yury Rybak (BLR) |

=== Women's events ===
| Event | Gold | Silver | Bronze |
|---|---|---|---|
| Extra-lightweight (48 kg) | Volha Leshchanka (BLR) | Lutzia Giniyatulina (RUS) | Erdenechimegiin Nomin (MGL) |
| Extra-lightweight (48 kg) | Volha Leshchanka (BLR) | Lutzia Giniyatulina (RUS) | Irina Paunikova (BUL) |
| Half-lightweight (52 kg) | Sneljina Vasileva (BUL) | Susanna Mirzoyan (RUS) | Maryna Zarkaya (BLR) |
| Half-lightweight (52 kg) | Sneljina Vasileva (BUL) | Susanna Mirzoyan (RUS) | Mönkhbaataryn Bundmaa (MGL) |
| Lightweight (56 kg) | Marina Korneeva (RUS) | Elitsa Razheva (BUL) | Zhanargul Akbalanova (KAZ) |
| Lightweight (56 kg) | Marina Korneeva (RUS) | Elitsa Razheva (BUL) | Paim Anzela (BLR) |
| Welterweight (60 kg) | Ana Repida (MDA) | Olesia Kondratyeva (RUS) | Olga Panchuk (UKR) |
| Welterweight (60 kg) | Ana Repida (MDA) | Olesia Kondratyeva (RUS) | Raissa Baliyeva (KAZ) |
| Half-middleweight (64 kg) | Anastasia Lieshkova (BLR) | Hurelbaataryn Bigermaa (MGL) | Yulia Kuzina (RUS) |
| Half-middleweight (64 kg) | Anastasia Lieshkova (BLR) | Hurelbaataryn Bigermaa (MGL) | Ieva Klimasauskiene (LTU) |
| Middleweight (68 kg) | Svetlana Averushkina (RUS) | Marya Yancheva (BUL) | Maria Semenchuk (UKR) |
| Middleweight (68 kg) | Svetlana Averushkina (RUS) | Marya Yancheva (BUL) | Sanela Markovic (SRB) |
| Super-middleweight (72 kg) | Svetlana Galyant (RUS) | Katsiaryna Radzevich (BLR) | Iana Zazulina (MDA) |
| Super-middleweight (72 kg) | Svetlana Galyant (RUS) | Katsiaryna Radzevich (BLR) | Petya Petkova (BUL) |
| Half-heavyweight (80 kg) | Mariya Oryashkova (BUL) | Anastasia Matrosova (UKR) | Dibnara Orazbekova (KAZ) |
| Half-heavyweight (80 kg) | Mariya Oryashkova (BUL) | Anastasia Matrosova (UKR) | Sviatlana Tsimashenka (BLR) |
| Heavyweight (80+ kg) | Irina Rodina (RUS) | Yulia Barysik (BLR) | Tzeca Bojlova (BUL) |
| Heavyweight (80+ kg) | Irina Rodina (RUS) | Yulia Barysik (BLR) | Elena Patsiou (GRE) |

=== Medal table ===
| Rank | Nation | Gold | Silver | Bronze | Total |
|---|---|---|---|---|---|
| 1 | Russia | 15 | 7 | 3 | 25 |
| 2 | Bulgaria | 3 | 4 | 7 | 14 |
| 3 | Belarus | 2 | 2 | 6 | 10 |
| 4 | Uzbekistan | 1 | 4 | 3 | 8 |
| 5 | Ukraine | 1 | 3 | 6 | 10 |
| 6 | Kyrgyzstan | 1 | 1 | 2 | 4 |
| 6 | Mongolia | 1 | 1 | 2 | 4 |
| 8 | Georgia | 1 | 0 | 5 | 6 |
| 9 | Moldova | 1 | 0 | 1 | 2 |
| 10 | Kazakhstan | 0 | 2 | 9 | 11 |
| 11 | Tajikistan | 0 | 1 | 2 | 3 |
| 12 | Israel | 0 | 1 | 0 | 1 |
| 12 | Japan | 0 | 1 | 0 | 1 |
| 14 | Armenia | 0 | 0 | 2 | 2 |
| 14 | Lithuania | 0 | 0 | 2 | 2 |
| 16 | Greece | 0 | 0 | 1 | 1 |
| 16 | Serbia | 0 | 0 | 1 | 1 |
| 16 | Venezuela | 0 | 0 | 1 | 1 |
| Totals (18 entries) | | 26 | 27 | 53 | 106 |
