= 2012 M-1 Challenge season =

Mixed martial arts events

- League: M-1 Global
- Sport: Mixed Martial Arts
- Duration: March 16, 2012 – December 8, 2012

M-1 Challenge seasons
- ← 2011 2013 →

The 2012 M-1 Challenge season was the fifth season of mixed martial arts (MMA) fighting presented by the M-1 Global promotion. The first event of the year, M-1 Challenge 31, was held on March 16, 2012, at the Ice Palace in Saint Petersburg, Russia.

== List of events ==
Event	Date	Venue	City
M-1 Challenge 31	March 16, 2012	Ice Palace	Saint Petersburg, Russia
M-1 Challenge 32	May 16, 2012	Crocus Expo	Moscow, Russia
M-1 Challenge 33	June 6, 2012	Ingush centre	Republic of Ingushetia, Russia
M-1 Global: Fedor vs. Rizzo	June 21, 2012	Ice Palace	Saint Petersburg, Russia
M-1 Challenge 34	September 30, 2012	Druzhba Multipurpose Arena	Moscow, Russia
M-1 Challenge 35	November 15, 2012	Ice Palace	Saint Petersburg, Russia
M-1 Challenge 36	December 8, 2012	Mytishchi Arena	Mytishchi, Russia

== Event summaries ==
=== M-1 Challenge 31 ===
M-1 Challenge 31: Oleinik vs. Monson
- Date: March 16, 2012
- Venue: Ice Palace
- City: Saint Petersburg, Russia

M-1 Challenge 31: Oleinik vs. Monson was held on March 16, 2012, in Saint Petersburg, Russia. In the main event, Alexander Emelianenko defeated Tadas Rimkevičius officially by technical knockout at 1:52 of the second round. Reports say that the first round of the fight was fairly even, though Emelianenko was able to drop his opponent late in the round. During the second round, Rimkevičius tapped out to the punches coming from Emelianenko.

The M-1 Global Welterweight Championship was won by Rashid Magomedov from Yasubey Enomoto after a five-round unanimous decision victory. In another featured bout, Jeff Monson faced Alexey Oleinik where Monson won a split decision victory.

Results

Card	Weight Class				Round	Time	Method	Notes
Preliminary	Middleweight	(Brazil) Bruno Carvalho	def.	(Russia) Ramazan Esenbaev	3	5:00	Decision (split) (29–28, 28–29, 29–28)	
Preliminary	Middleweight	(Russia) Ilya Doderkin	def.	(Russia) Alexei Martinov	1	1:57	Submission (rear-naked choke)	
Preliminary	Flyweight	(Russia) Marat Gafurov	def.	(Czech Republic) David Kozma	2	2:10	Submission (rear-naked choke)	
Preliminary	Lightweight	(Russia) Vugar Bakhshiev	def.	(France) Jerome Bouisson	2	5:00	TKO (doctor stoppage)	
Preliminary	Light Heavyweight	(Russia) Abdulmazhid Magomedov	def.	(Russia) Artur Shumakov	1	3:53	Submission (rear-naked choke)	
Preliminary	Heavyweight	(Estonia) Deniss Smoldarev	def.	(Russia) Denis Komkin	3	5:00	Decision (split) (29–28, 28–30, 29–28)	
Main	Welterweight	(Russia) Alexander Yakovlev	vs.	(Russia) Shamil Zavurov	3	5:00	Draw (unanimous) (29–29, 28–28, 28–28)	
Main	Heavyweight	(United States) Jeff Monson	def.	(Ukraine) Alexey Oleinik	3	5:00	Decision (split) (29–28, 28–29, 30–27)	
Main	Welterweight	(Russia) Rashid Magomedov	def.	(Japan) Yasubey Enomoto	5	5:00	Decision (unanimous) (50–45, 49–47, 50–45)	For M-1 Welterweight Championship. Rashid to become new M-1 Global Welterweight Champion.
Main	Heavyweight	(Russia) Alexander Emelianenko	def.	(Lithuania) Tadas Rimkevičius	2	1:52	TKO (punches)	

=== M-1 Challenge 32 ===
M-1 Challenge 32
- Date: May 16, 2012
- Venue: Crocus Expo
- City: Moscow, Russia

M-1 Challenge 32 is expected to be held on May 16, 2012, in Moscow, Russia. The event will include a Lightweight Championship bout in which Daniel Weichel will attempt to defend his title against Yuri Ivlev. But Yuri is injured arm and suffered a bout on June 21

Fight card

Card	Weight Class				Round	Time	Method	Notes
Main	Heavyweight	(United States) Kenny Garner (c)	def.	(Russia) Magomed Malikov	3	3:31	KO (punches)	For M-1 Heavyweight Interim Championship
Main	Middleweight	(Brazil) Mario Miranda	def.	(Russia) Arthur Guseinov	3	2:39	Submission (rear naked choke)	For Vacant M-1 Middleweight Championship
Main	Light Heavyweight	(Russia) Maxim Grishin	def.	(Denmark) Joachim Christensen	3	5:00	Decision (unanimous) (29–28, 29–28, 29–27)	
Main	Lightweight	(Russia) Musa Khamanaev	def.	(Belarus) Artiom Damkovsky	3	5:00	Decision (unanimous) (30–27, 30–27, 30–26)	
Main	Light Heavyweight	(Russia) Arsen Abdulkerimov	def.	(Netherlands) Jessie Gibbs	2	0:49	Submission (guillotine choke)	
Preliminary	Welterweight	(Russia) Ramazan Esenbaev	def.	(United States) Daniel Madrid	1	2:28	Submission (rear-naked choke)	
Preliminary	Light Heavyweight	(Poland) Marcin Zontek	def.	(Russia) Salim Daudov	2	2:41	TKO (punches)	
Preliminary	Lightweight	(Russia) Nikolai Kaushansky	def.	(Lithuania) Mantas Liulionis	1	2:04	Submission (rear-naked choke)	
Preliminary	Lightweight	(Russia) Iftikhor Arbobov	def.	(Russia) Igor Egorov	1	1:27	TKO (punches)	

=== M-1 Challenge 33 ===
M-1 Challenge 33
- Date: June 6, 2012
- Venue: Ingush centre
- City: Dzheyrakhsky District, Russia

M-1 Challenge 33: Emelianenko vs. Magomedov was held on June 6, 2012, in Dzheyrakhsky District, Russia.

Fight card

Card	Weight Class				Round	Time	Method	Notes
Main	Heavyweight	(Russia) Alexander Emelianenko	def.	(Russia) Ibragim Magomedov	2	5:00	TKO (Doctor Stoppage)	
Main	Welterweight	(Russia) Mukhamed Aushev	def.	(Croatia) Ivica Truscek	3	5:00	Decision (Split)	
Main	Welterweight	(Russia) Khusein Khaliev	def.	(France) Patrick Vallee	1	0:39	Sub (Arm Bar)	
Main	Welterweight	(Spain) Juan Manuel Suarez	def.	(Russia) Eric Oganov	2	5:00	TKO (Corner Stoppage)	
Preliminary	Featherweight	(Russia) Yunus Evloev	def.	(France) Olivier Pastor	3	5:00	Decision (Unanimous)	
Preliminary	Lightweight	(Russia) Said Khamzat Avkhadov	def.	(Russia) Arsen Temirkhanov	3	5:00	Decision (Unanimous)	
Preliminary	Welterweight	(Russia) Sheikh-Magomed Arapkhanov	def.	(Bulgaria) Sunay Hamidov	1	2:03	TKO (Doctor Stoppage)	
Preliminary	Lightweight	(Russia) Murad Abdullaev	def.	(Austria) Arbi Agujev	3	5:00	Decision (Unanimous)	
Preliminary	Lightweight	(France) Cazal Philippe	def.	(Russia) Alexey Nevzorov	4	5:00	Sub (Triangle choke)	Lightweight Final the M-1 Selection GP
Preliminary	Middleweight	(Russia) Yuri Shurov	def.	(Bulgaria) Rafal Lewon	2	1:00	TKO (Doctor Stoppage)	Middleweight Final the M-1 Selection GP
Preliminary	Welterweight	(Russia) Dzhambulat Kurbanov	def.	(Spain) Ivan Raul	1	2:47	Sub (Arm Bar)	Welterweight Final the M-1 Selection GP
Preliminary	Featherweight	(Croatia) Antun Račić	def.	(Russia) Salman Dzamaldaev	2	3:36	Sub (Guillotine Choke)	
Preliminary	Lightweight	(Croatia) Ivica Dzebic	def.	(Russia) Ashot Pashyan	1	4:50	TKO (Punches)	

=== M-1 Global: Fedor vs. Rizzo ===
M-1 Global: Fedor vs. Rizzo
- Date: June 21, 2012
- Venue: Ice Palace
- City: Saint Petersburg, Russia

On April 6, 2012, Evgeni Kogan, Director of Global operations for M-1 Global, announced that the promotion will hold an event on June 21, 2012, in Saint Petersburg, Russia. At this event, Fedor Emelianenko must face with Pedro Rizzo.

On June 21, 2012, in St. Petersburg, Russia, Fedor Emelianenko faced three-time UFC heavyweight title contender Pedro Rizzo in an event promoted by M-1 Global. Prior to the bout, it was rumored that Fedor would retire after taking on Rizzo. Originally denying any possible rumors of retirement at first, Emelianenko later announced his retirement in-ring post-fight after defeating Rizzo by knockout in the first two minutes of the first round.

Fight card

Card	Weight Class				Round	Time	Method	Notes
Main	Heavyweight	(Russia) Fedor Emelianenko	def.	(Brazil) Pedro Rizzo	1	1:24	KO (Punches)	
Main	Heavyweight	(United States) Kenny Garner	def.	(Georgia (country)) Guram Gugenishvili	3	5:00	TKO (Doctor's Stoppage)	For M-1 Global Heavyweight Championship
Main	Lightweight	(Russia) Musa Khamanaev	def.	(Germany) Daniel Weichel	1	1:55	Sub (Heel Hook)	For M-1 Global Lightweight Championship
Main	Heavyweight	(United States) Jeff Monson	def.	(Russia) Denis Komkin	1	1:58	Sub (North-South Choke)	
Main	Featherweight	(Ukraine) Marat Gafurov	def.	(Russia) Mairbek Taisumov	3	5:00	Decision (Split)	
Main	Featherweight	(Russia) Mikhail Malyutin	def.	(Azerbaijan) Renat Gasanov	1	3:16	TKO (punches)	
Preliminary	Welterweight	(Russia) Ramazan Emeev	def.	(Russia) Albert Duraev	1	1:36	TKO (Punches)	
Preliminary	Featherweight	(Russia) Vugar Bahshiev	def.	(France) Jerome Bouisson	1	2:48	Sub (Heel Hook)	
Preliminary	Featherweight	(Ukraine) Pavel Vitruk	def.	(Poland) Radoslaw Piechnik	3	5:00	Decision (Unanimous)	
Preliminary	Heavyweight	(Russia) Akhamed Sultanov	def.	(Russia) Denis Goltsov	1	1:28	Sub (Heel Hook)	
Preliminary	Middleweight	(Russia) Abdulmazhid Magomedov	def.	(Uzbekistan) Davrhek Isakov	1	3:25	TKO (punches)	

=== M-1 Challenge 34 ===
M-1 Challenge 34
- Date: September 30, 2012
- Venue: Druzhba Multipurpose Arena
- City: Moscow, Russia

M-1 Challenge 34: Emelianenko vs. Glukhov was held on September 30, 2012, in Moscow, Russia

Fight card

Card	Weight Class				Round	Time	Method	Notes
Main	Heavyweight	(Russia) Alexander Emelianenko	def.	(Latvia) Konstantin Gluhov	5	5:00	Decision (split)	
Main	Light Heavyweight	(Russia) Sergey Kornev	def.	(Poland) Marcin Zontek	5	5:00	Decision (split)	М-1 Global Light Heavyweight Championship
Main	Welterweight	(Switzerland) Yasubey Enomoto	def.	(Chechnya) Khusein Khaliev	3	5:00	Decision (split)	
Main	Middleweight	(France) Gregory Babene	def.	(Spain) Enoc Solves Torres	2	2:19	Submission (heel hook)	
Main	Lightweight	(Russia) Aliyar Sarkerov	def.	(Russia) Ekhdigat Adakishiev	3	5:00	Decision (unanimous)	

=== M- 1 Challenge 35 ===
M-1 Challenge 35
- Date: November 15, 2012
- Venue: Ice Palace
- City: Saint Petersburg, Russia

M-1 Challenge 35: Emelianenko vs. Monson was held on November 15, 2012, in Ice Palace, Saint Petersburg, Russia.

"'Fight card"'

Card	Weight Class				Round	Time	Method	Notes
Main	Heavyweight	(United States) Jeff Monson	def.	(Russia) Alexander Emelianenko	2	3:17	Submission (North-South Choke)	
Main	Welterweight	(Russia) Rashid Magomedov(c)	def.	(Russia) Alexander Yakovlev	5	5:00	Decision (unanimous)	For the M-1 Global Welterweight Championship
Main	Middleweight	(Russia) Ramazan Emeev	def.	(Brazil) Mario Miranda (fighter) (c)	5	5:00	Decision (unanimous)	For the M-1 Global Middleweight Championship
Main	Featherweight	(Russia) Marat Gafurov	def.	(Azerbaijan) Vugar Bakhshiev	1	4:18	Submission (rear-naked choke)	
Main	Heavyweight	(Estonia) Denis Smoldarev	def.	(Russia) Akhmed Sultanov	3	5:00	Decision (unanimous)	
Preliminary	Lightweight	(Russia) Mairbek Taisumov	def.	(England) Leon del Gaudio	1	3:45	Submission (guillotine choke)	
Preliminary	Featherweight	(Russia) Mikhail Malyutin	def.	(Ukraine) Artem Boiko	2	1:39	Submission (anaconda)	
Preliminary	Lightweight	(Belarus) Artem Damkovsky	def.	(Croatia) Ivica Truscek	3	5:00	Decision (split)	
Preliminary	Featherweight	(Russia) Pavel Vitruk	def.	(Russia) Ilya Ovechkin	3	5:00	Decision (unanimous)	

=== M-1 Challenge 36 ===
M-1 Challenge 36
- Date: December 8, 2012
- Venue: Mytishchi Arena
- City: Mytishchi, Russia

M-1 Challenge 36: Garner vs. Guram II was held on December 8, 2012, in Mytishchi Arena, Mytishchi, Russia.

"'Fight Card"'

Card	Weight Class				Round	Time	Method	Notes
Main	Heavyweight	(United States) Kenny Garner (c)	def.	(Georgia (country)) Guram Gugenishvili	4	2:03	TKO (punches)	For the M-1 Global Heavyweight Championship
Main	Middleweight	(Russia) Andrei Semenov (fighter)	def	(Italy) Michele Vergenelli	3	5:00	Decision (unanimous)	
Main	Welterweight	(Russia) Artur Guseinov	def.	(Ukraine) Evgeniy Fomenko	1	0:55	KO (spinning back kick)	

== See also ==
- M-1 Global
