= Samad Rustamov =

Uzbekistani Combat Sambo fighter

Medal record
Men's Combat Sambo
Representing Uzbekistan
World Sambo Championships

Samad Rustamov is an Uzbekistani Combat Sambo fighter who competed in the 2008 World Sambo Championship and placed 5th, losing to the eventual champion Blagoi Ivanov. He also won the silver medal at the 2006 World Sambo Championships.
